= Keizō Takemi =

Japanese politician (born 1951)

- 武見 敬三
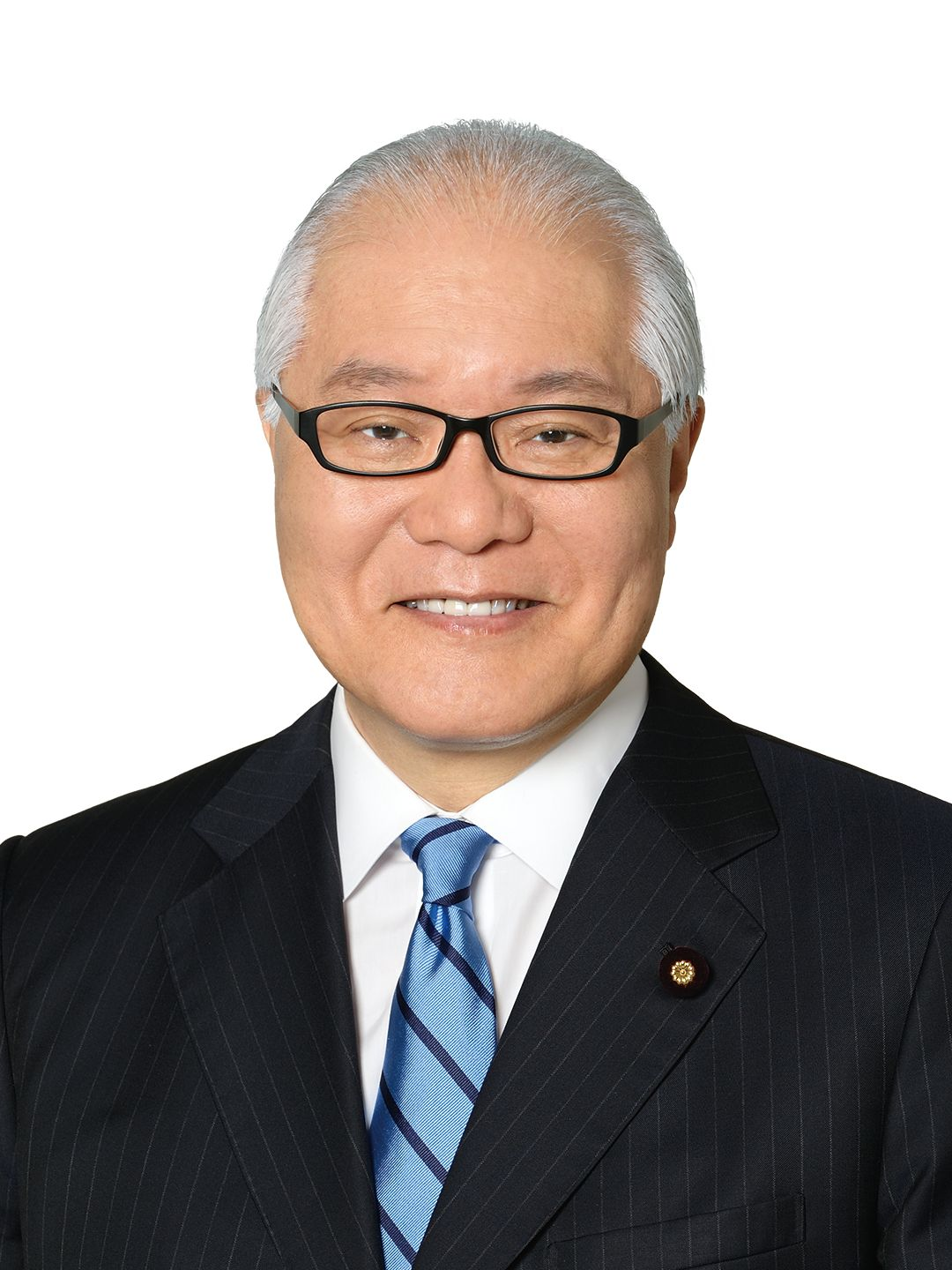
- Official portrait, 2018

Minister of Health, Labour, and Welfare
- In office 13 September 2023 – 1 October 2024
- Prime Minister: Fumio Kishida
- Preceded by: Katsunobu Katō
- Succeeded by: Takamaro Fukuoka

Member of the House of Councillors
- In office 14 December 2012 – 28 July 2025
- Constituency: National PR (2012–2013); Tokyo at-large (2013–2025)
- In office 24 July 1995 – 28 July 2007
- Constituency: National PR

Personal details
- Born: 5 November 1951 (age 74) Minato, Tokyo, Japan
- Party: Liberal Democratic
- Relations: Taro Takemi (father)
- Education: Keio University

Keizo Takemi (武見 敬三, Takemi Keizō; born 5 November 1951) is a Japanese politician of the Liberal Democratic Party who served as a member of the House of Councillors of Japan.

== Career ==
Takemi used to be a professor of Tokai University whose main subject is international politics. He was first elected to a member of the House of Councillors on 23 July 1995. He served until July 2007, and was Vice Minister of Ministry of Health, Labour and Welfare of the Abe Cabinet from September 2006 until August 2007. Takemi narrowly lost his seat in 2007. In 2012, he returned to the House of Councillors, and he won reelection in 2013 and 2019.

He was a tutor of the School of Politics for Women (女性のための政治スクール).

In 2006, United Nations Secretary-General Kofi Annan appointed Takemi to a High-level Panel on United Nations Systemwide Coherence, which was set up to explore how the United Nations system could work more coherently and effectively across the world in the areas of development, humanitarian assistance and the environment.

From 2012 to 2014, Takemi served on the High-Level Task Force for the International Conference on Population and Development, co-chaired by Joaquim Chissano and Tarja Halonen.

In March 2016, Takemi was appointed by United Nations Secretary-General Ban Ki-moon to the High-Level Commission on Health Employment and Economic Growth, which was co-chaired by presidents François Hollande of France and Jacob Zuma of South Africa.

In June 2019, World Health Organization (WHO) Director General Tedros Adhanom Ghebreyesus appointed Takemi as WHO Goodwill Ambassador for Universal Health Coverage. Since 2022, he has been a member of the Commission for Universal Health convened by Chatham House and co-chaired by Helen Clark and Jakaya Kikwete.

Takemi was elected chairman of the Liberal Democratic Party caucus in the House of Councillors in November 2024, after Masakazu Sekiguchi resigned to become President of the House of Councillors. He was defeated in the 2025 Japanese House of Councillors election and announced his retirement from politics.

== Personal life ==
His father was Taro Takemi, president of the Japan Medical Association.

Political offices
| Preceded by Masao Akamatsu; Kiyoshi Nakano | Senior Vice Minister of Health, Labour and Welfare; September 2006 - August 2007; Served alongside: Noritoshi Ishida | Succeeded by Koichi Kishi; Kyoko Nishikawa |
| Preceded by Katsunobu Katō | Minister of Health, Labour and Welfare; 2023–2024 | Succeeded by Takamaro Fukuoka |
House of Councillors
| Preceded by Masako Ōkawara; Natsuo Yamaguchi; Kan Suzuki; Tamayo Marukawa; Ryūhei Kawada | Member of the House of Councillors from Tokyo (Class of 1947/1953/.../2013); 2013–2025; Served alongside: Tamayo Marukawa, Natsuo Yamaguchi, Yoshiko Kira, Tarō Yamamoto, etc. | Multi-member district |
| Preceded by 50-member district | Member of the House of Councillors by proportional representation (Class of 1947/1953/.../1995); 1995–2007; Served alongside: 49→47 others | Succeeded by 48-member district |
Party political offices
| Preceded by Jiro Aichi | Chairman of the Policy Research Council for the Liberal Democratic Party in the House of Councillors; 2017—2018 | Succeeded by Ichita Yamamoto |
| Preceded by Masakazu Sekiguchi | Chairman of the Liberal Democratic Party in the House of Councillors; 2024–2025 | Succeeded by Masaji Matsuyama |
