= Toshiko Takeya =

Japanese politician

- 竹谷 とし子
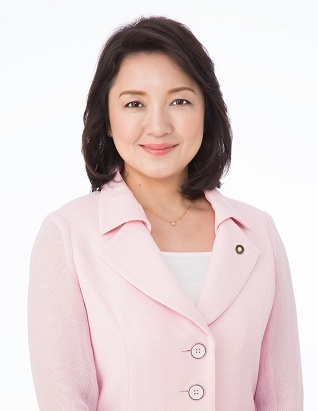
- Official portrait, 2014

Chief Representative of Komeito
- In office 22 January 2026 – 3 October 2026
- Preceded by: Tetsuo Saito
- Succeeded by: Mitsunari Okamoto

Member of the House of Councillors
- Incumbent
- Assumed office 26 July 2010
- Preceded by: Yuji Sawa
- Constituency: Tokyo at-large

Personal details
- Born: 30 September 1969 (age 57) Shibetsu, Hokkaido, Japan
- Party: Komeito
- Education: Sōka University

Toshiko Takeya (Japanese: 竹谷とし子, Hepburn: Takeya Toshiko; married name Toshiko Kikuchi, 菊地とし子, Kikuchi Toshiko; born September 30, 1969) is a Japanese politician who served as leader of Kōmeitō from January to October 2026 and a member of the House of Councilors representing Tokyo. She received the second highest vote share (13.2%) in the 2010 Japanese Senate election in Tokyo and succeeded Yūji Sawa as Kōmeitō Senator from Tokyo who retired after one term.

== Early life ==
A native of Shibetsu, Hokkaidō, Takeya graduated from Sōka High School in Kodaira city, Tokyo and from Sōka University's Faculty of Economics in 1992. During her university studies, she passed the examination as Certified Public Accountant (kōnin kaikeishi) in 1991. After graduation, she began to work for Tōmatsu "LLC" (kansa hōjin, a business type for external auditors, regulated by Japanese CPA legislation). In 1996, she transferred to Tōmatsu spin-off ABeam Consulting "Ltd." (K.K.). Her work at ABeam included development projects in Indonesia and Vietnam.

== Political career ==
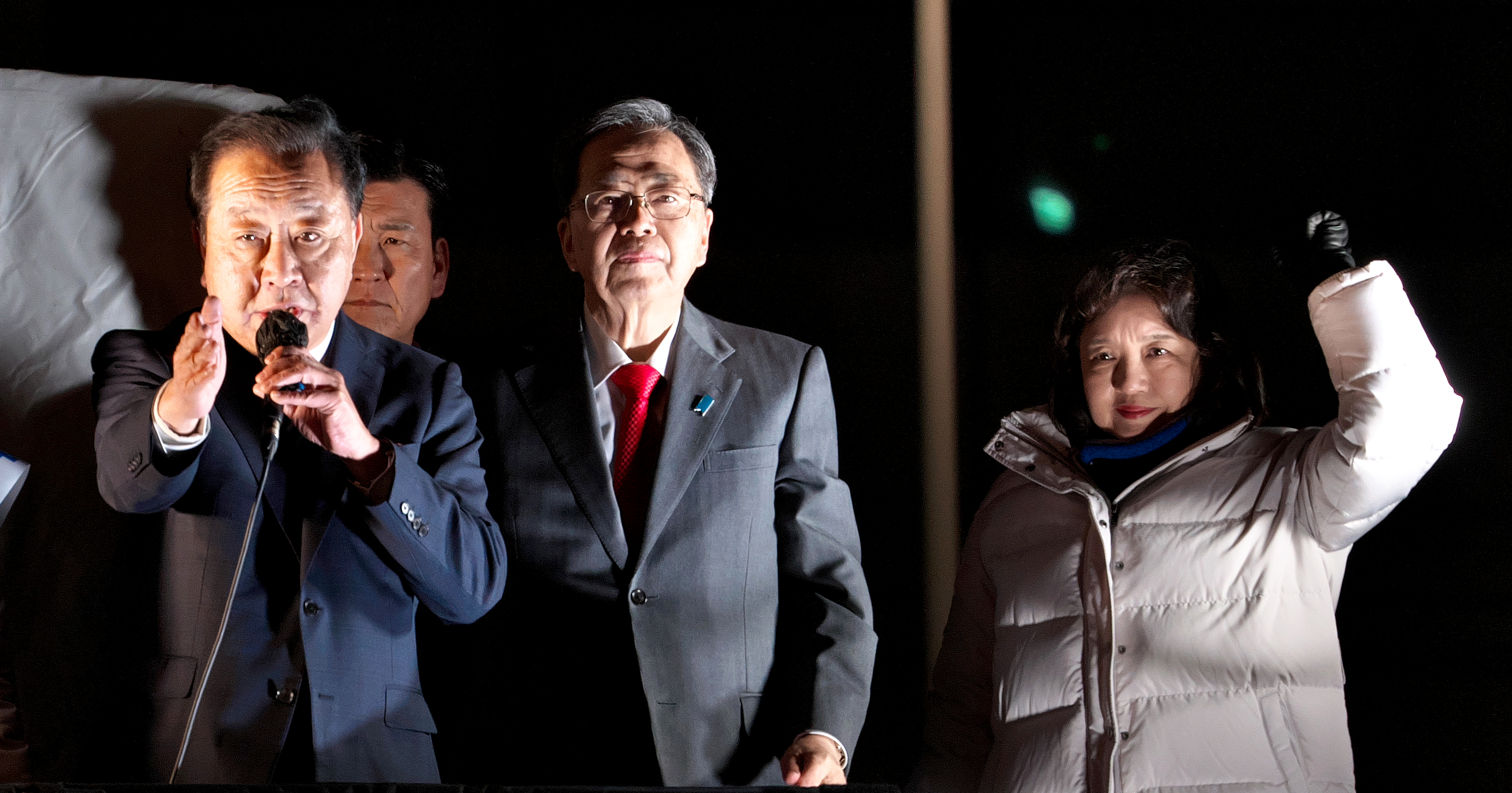
Yoshihiko Noda gave a street speech for the general election with Tetsuo Saito and Takeya (February 7, 2026)

As Yūji Sawa announced his retirement in order to not reach Kōmeitō's age limit of 66 while in office, Takeya decided to enter national politics in December 2009. Tokyo elects five Senators per election since 2007; in the 2010 election, popular Democratic administrative reform minister Renhō Murata garnered over 1.7 million votes, more than twice that of any other candidate. Takeya received 806,862 votes, about 20,000 less than Sawa six years before, but enough for second place as top elected Murata took more than a quarter of the Tokyo vote – Sawa had ranked fourth behind the major party candidates in 2004 –, and above Kōmeitō's target of 800,000 votes.

As of 2012, she is a member in the Committees on Financial Affairs (zaisei kin'yū), Oversight of Administration (gyōsei kansa) and the Special Committee on Official Development Assistance and Related Matters (seifu kaihatsu enjo nado ni kan suru tokubetsu-iinkai).

House of Councillors
Preceded by Masaharu Nakagawa; Toshio Ogawa; Renhō Murata; Yūji Sawa	Member of the House of Councillors from Tokyo (Class of 1950/1956/.../2010); 2010– Served alongside: Renhō Murata, Masaharu Nakagawa, Toshio Ogawa, Kōta Matsuda	Incumbent
