= Tamayo Marukawa =

Japanese politician and announcer

- 丸川 珠代
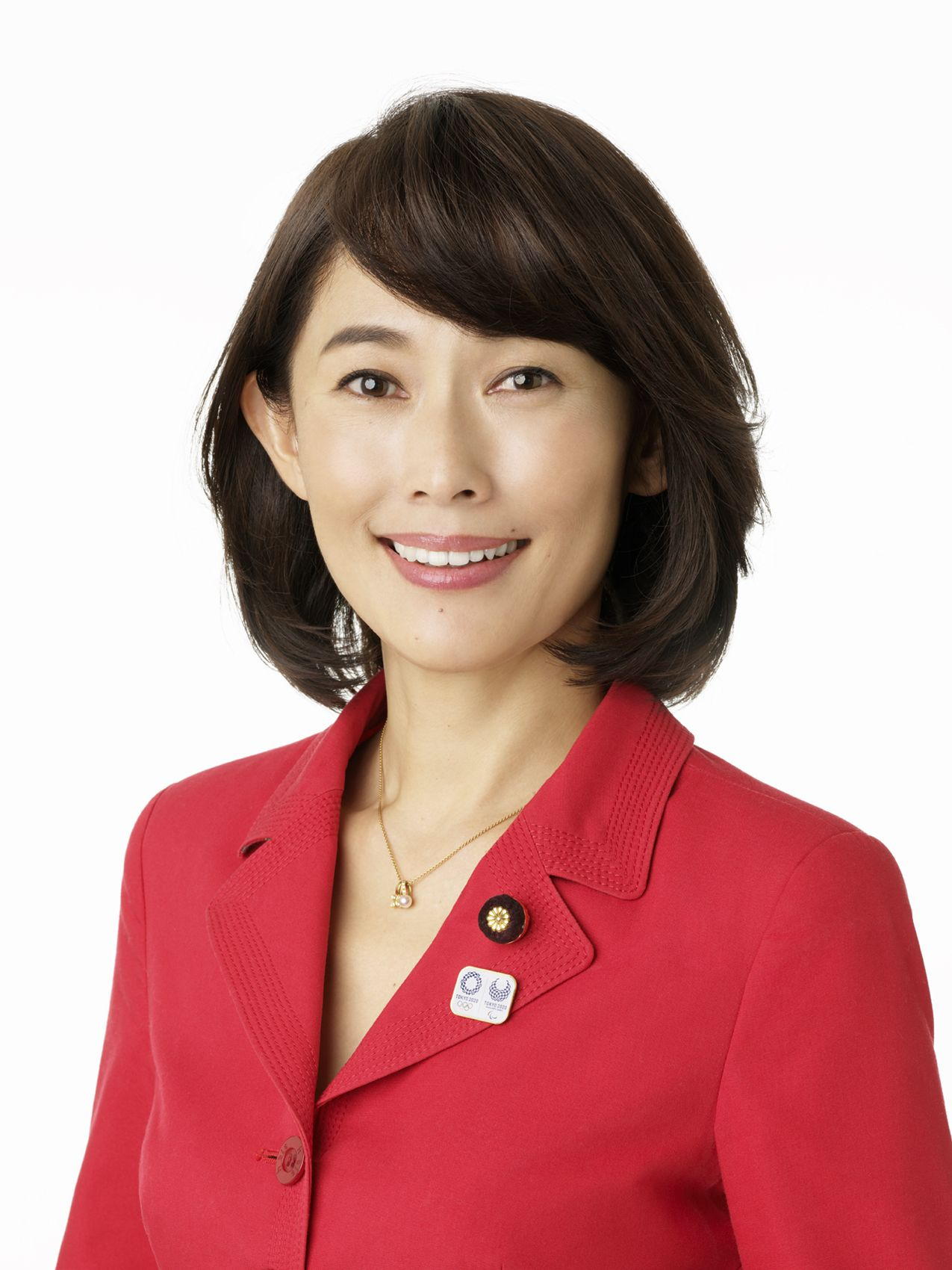
- Official portrait, 2018

Minister of State for the Tokyo Olympic and Paralympic Games
- In office 18 February 2021 – 4 October 2021
- Prime Minister: Yoshihide Suga
- Preceded by: Seiko Hashimoto
- Succeeded by: Noriko Horiuchi
- In office 3 August 2016 – 3 August 2017
- Prime Minister: Shinzo Abe
- Preceded by: Toshiaki Endo
- Succeeded by: Shun'ichi Suzuki

Minister of the Environment and for Nuclear Emergency Preparedness
- In office 7 October 2015 – 3 August 2016
- Prime Minister: Shinzo Abe
- Preceded by: Yoshio Mochizuki
- Succeeded by: Koichi Yamamoto

Member of the House of Representatives
- Incumbent
- Assumed office 9 February 2026
- Preceded by: Akihiro Matsuo
- Constituency: Tokyo 7th

Member of the House of Councillors
- In office 29 July 2007 – 15 October 2024
- Preceded by: Sanzō Hosaka
- Succeeded by: Daichi Suzuki
- Constituency: Tokyo at-large

Personal details
- Born: 19 January 1971 (age 55) Kobe, Hyōgo, Japan
- Party: Liberal Democratic
- Spouse: Taku Otsuka (m. 2008)
- Children: 1
- Education: University of Tokyo

Tamayo Marukawa (丸川 珠代, Marukawa Tamayo, born 19 January 1971) is a Japanese politician and former announcer of TV Asahi, who served as a member of the House of Councillors from 2007 to 2024. She is a member of the Liberal Democratic Party. She served as the head of the Women's Affairs Office of the LDP in October 2009.

She graduated from the University of Tokyo with the Bachelor of Economics degree in 1993.

The 2007 House of Councillors election marked her entry into politics. The documentary film "Pictures at an Election" covers some of her campaign.

She is married to Taku Otsuka (a member of the House of Representatives). Their wedding ceremony was held in Meiji Shrine on 16 June 2008. They have one child.

Marukawa has served twice as Minister of State for the Tokyo Olympic and Paralympic Games. She first served in the role under Prime Minister Shinzo Abe from August 2016 until August 2017. She was named to the post a second time by Yoshihide Suga on 18 February 2021 to replace fellow LDP lawmaker and former Olympian Seiko Hashimoto, who had resigned from her Cabinet post in order to take over as President of the Tokyo 2020 Organizing Committee.

Marukawa stood as the LDP candidate for the Tokyo 7th district in the October 2024 House of Representatives election, intending to switch houses. She thus automatically lost her seat in the House of Councillors when the election was announced. Marukawa was defeated in the election.

Marukawa again contested Tokyo 7th district in the 2026 general election and was elected.

She was affiliated with the nationalist organisation Nippon Kaigi.

House of Councillors
Preceded by Sanzō Hosaka; Natsuo Yamaguchi; Kan Suzuki; Yasuo Ogata	Councillor for Tokyo At-large district 2007–2024; Served alongside: Masako Ōkawara, Natsuo Yamaguchi, Kan Suzuki, Ryūhei Kawada, etc.	Succeeded by Natsuo Yamaguchi; Yoshiko Kira; Ayaka Shiomura; Keizō Takemi
Political offices
Preceded by Yoshio Mochizuki	Minister of the Environment; 2015–2016	Succeeded by Koichi Yamamoto
Preceded by Toshiaki Endo	Minister for the Tokyo Olympic and Paralympic Games; 2016–2017	Succeeded by Shun'ichi Suzuki
Preceded by Seiko Hashimoto	Minister for the Tokyo Olympic and Paralympic Games; 2021	Succeeded by Noriko Horiuchi
Party political offices
Preceded by Katsuei Hirasawa	Chief of the Public Relations Headquarters, Liberal Democratic Party; 2020–2021	Succeeded by Haruko Arimura
