= Kan Suzuki =

Japanese politician

- 鈴木 寛
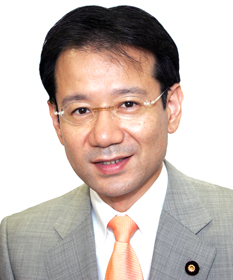
- Official portrait, 2010

Member of the House of Councillors
- In office 29 July 2001 – 28 July 2013
- Preceded by: Hideo Den
- Succeeded by: Yoshiko Kira
- Constituency: Tokyo at-large

Personal details
- Born: 5 February 1964 (age 62) Akashi, Hyōgo, Japan
- Party: Democratic
- Education: University of Tokyo

Kan Suzuki (鈴木 寛, Suzuki Kan; born February 5, 1964) is a Japanese politician of the Democratic Party of Japan, a member of the House of Councillors in the Diet (national legislature). A native of Akashi, Hyōgo and graduate of the University of Tokyo, he joined the Ministry of International Trade and Industry in 1986. He was elected to the House of Councillors for the first time in 2001.

House of Councillors
Preceded by Yūichirō Uozumi; Sanzō Hosaka; Yasuo Ogata; Hideo Den	Councillor for Tokyo's At-large district 2001– Served alongside: Sanzō Hosaka, Natsuo Yamaguchi, Yasuo Ogata, Masako Ōkawara, Tamayo Marukawa	Incumbent
