= Natsuo Yamaguchi =

Japanese politician

- 山口 那津男
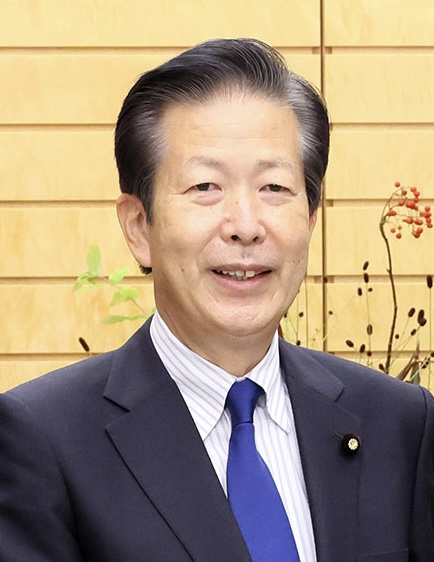
- Yamaguchi in 2022

Chief Representative of Komeito
- In office 8 September 2009 – 28 September 2024
- Preceded by: Akihiro Ota
- Succeeded by: Keiichi Ishii

Member of the House of Councillors
- In office 29 July 2001 – 28 July 2025
- Preceded by: Yuichiro Uozumi
- Succeeded by: Yudai Kawamura
- Constituency: Tokyo at-large

Member of the House of Representatives
- In office 18 February 1990 – 20 October 1996
- Preceded by: Yoshikatsu Takeiri
- Succeeded by: Constituency abolished
- Constituency: Tokyo 10th

Personal details
- Born: 12 July 1952 (age 74) Nakaminato, Ibaraki, Japan
- Party: Komeito (since 1998)
- Other political affiliations: CGP (1990–1994); NFP (1994–1998)
- Education: University of Tokyo (LL.B)

Natsuo Yamaguchi (山口 那津男, Yamaguchi Natsuo; born 12 July 1952) is a Japanese politician who served as the chief representative of Komeito from 2009 to 2024. He is a member of the House of Councillors since 2001 and previously served in the House of Representatives from 1990 to 1996.

== Early life ==
A native of Nakaminato (now Hitachinaka), Ibaraki and he was raised in Hitachi until his graduation from public senior high school. His mother was a teacher of the elementary school. After graduating from the University of Tokyo with a B.L. degree in 1978, he became a lawyer in 1982.

== Political career ==
Yamaguchi was elected to the House of Representatives for the first time in 1990. After losing his seat in 1996, he ran unsuccessfully for the House of Representatives in 2000. In 2001, he was elected to the House of Councillors for the first time. He was appointed chairman of the policy research council in August 2008. Komeito suffered a major defeat in the 2009 general election, losing ten seats, including party president Akihiro Ota and secretary general Kazuo Kitagawa. On September 8, Yamaguchi replaced Ota as president. He had been chosen through a process centered on party heavyweights Takenori Kanzaki and Chikara Sakaguchi.

Yamaguchi's first term as party leader expired in September 2012, and he was re-appointed unopposed for another two years on 22 September 2012. No vote was required, as he was the only candidate. He has continually been reelected since then.

After fifteen years leading Komeito, Yamaguchi stepped down in September 2024 and was succeeded by Keiichi Ishii.

Yamaguchi has come out in support of the selective surname system for married couples and same-sex marriage, as well as voting rights for permanent foreign residents.

House of Councillors
Preceded by Yūichirō Uozumi; Sanzō Hosaka; Yasuo Ogata; Hideo Den	Councillor for Tokyo at-large district 2001–present Served alongside: Sanzō Hosaka, Kan Suzuki, Yasuo Ogata, Masako Ōkawara, Tamayo Marukawa	Incumbent
House of Representatives (Japan)
Preceded by Yoshikatsu Takeiri; Hyōsuke Kujiraoka; Yoshinobu Shimamura; Rikyū Shibusawa; Sukehiro Satō	Representative for Tokyo's 10th district (multi-member); 1990–1996; Served alongside: Rikyū Shibusawa, Yoshinobu Shimamura, Hyōsuke Kujiraoka, Sukehiro Satō, Ichirō Kamoshita, Rikukai Sasaki	District eliminated
Party political offices
Preceded by Tetsuo Saito	Chairman of the Policy Research Council, Komeito; 2008–2009	Succeeded by Tetsuo Saito
Preceded by Akihiro Ota	Chief Representative of Komeito; 2009–2024	Succeeded by Keiichi Ishii
