= JK business =

Pseudo-dating of high school girls in Japan

The JK business is a form of commercial activity in Japan centered on providing simulated dating experiences with high school girls. The abbreviation JK stands for 女子高生 (joshi kōsei, ja:女子高生), a female high school student. According to the definition used in statistics compiled by the National Police Agency, the term refers to businesses that offer customer service while employing advertising that explicitly states or implies that high school student are engaged in serving customers, using expressions such as "JK," "high school student," or "school uniform," regardless of whether actual high school girls are in fact involved in customer-facing roles. According to a survey conducted by Tokyo Metropolitan Assembly member Shun Otokita, as of 2017, cases in which individuals under the age of 18 or actual high school girls were engaged in JK businesses were rare.

A typical JK encounter entails a girl distributing leaflets offering a JKお散歩 (jēkē o-sanpo, “a JK walk” or “a walking date”). It grew significantly around 2006 after the maid café boom in Akihabara, Tokyo had died down. Earlier, the service offered was known as a "refresh business". When police began investigations, the "sanpo business" arose in which a girl is paid for social activities such as walking and talking, and is also sometimes referred to as "fortune telling". Another activity is reflexology (Japanese: リフレ, rifure, ja:リフレ). Around 2015 to 2016, Akihabara was regarded as the center of this business.

According to a survey conducted by the National Police Agency at the end of December 2024, there were 91 establishments operating JK businesses that conducted their activities in a manner suggestive of high school girls providing customer service, regardless of whether actual high school girls were in fact serving customers. Of these establishments, 63 offered massages to customers, 11 operated as bars, 10 were restaurants, 6 provided viewing or photography services, and 1 offered conversation or fortune-telling games. Seventy percent of the establishments were located in Tokyo and 18 percent in Osaka. Within Tokyo, 31 percent were situated in Ikebukuro, 19 percent in Akihabara, and 16 percent in Shinjuku.

== National and local government responses ==
Various prefectures and police departments in Japan have implemented policies and regulations to crack down on JK business because it can lead to under 18 prostitution. Several prefectures have amended their Prefectural Ordinance of Juvenile Protection to prohibit the business. Kanagawa Prefecture was the first to take action, amending its ordinance to regulate it in 2011.

In 2014, police increased their clamp down on girls under the age of 18, leading to a decline in the number of establishments where girls serve customers in confined spaces.

In 2017, the Tokyo Metropolitan Assembly enacted a landmark ordinance specifically targeting JK business, the first in the country to do so. Previously, the Tokyo Metropolitan Police had suppressed JK business and arrested girls using the national Labor Standards Act, the Businesses Affecting Public Morals Regulation Act, and the Child Welfare Act. The new ordinances expanded the scope of regulated industries beyond the amendments made to the previous Prefectural Ordinance of Juvenile Protection. The ordinance prohibits those who are under 18 from engaging in activities that arouse the sexual curiosity of opposite-sex customers, such as providing massages, allowing customers to take or view photographs of them, engaging in conversations with customers, serving food and beverages to customers, and going for walks with customers. However, if these acts do not arouse the customer's sexual curiosity, they are not illegal. It also prohibits advertisements that give customers the impression that girls under 18 work in the establishments, even if there are no such employees. Violators of this ordinance face a maximum penalty of up to one year in prison or a fine of up to one million yen.

The U.S. State Department reported in 2017 that the Government of Japan "does not fully comply with the minimum standards for the elimination of trafficking", and "continues to facilitate the prostitution of Japanese children".

In 2018, Osaka Prefecture amended its Prefectural Ordinance of Juvenile Protection to establish regulations similar to Tokyo's. Offenders face a maximum penalty of up to six months' imprisonment or a fine of up to 500,000 yen. Even if the business no longer employs workers under 18 after the conviction, the authorities may issue a six-month suspension order on the operation of the business. Violation may result in imprisonment for up to one year or a fine of up to 500,000 yen, and the name of the establishment will be made public.

In 2023, the National Police Agency issued instructions to police departments in each prefecture to intensify efforts to eradicate JK business. These instructions included thoroughly understanding the actual situation, strengthening enforcement measures, stepping up education and awareness campaigns targeting young people, and improving counseling systems for young people.

== Support organizations for at-risk girls ==
Yumeno Nito, a strong critic of government inaction on the problem, founded a charity in 2013 to assist girls in Tokyo. Cultural anthropologists have described Japan as having a shame culture, creating a barrier for teenage runaways to be reunited with their families, making them vulnerable to recruitment into the underage sex industry.
