= Masaharu Nakagawa (House of Councillors) =

Japanese politician

Nakagawa Masaharu
- 中川 雅治
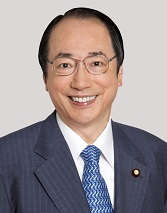
- Official portrait, 2012

Minister of the Environment
- In office 2 October 2018 – 11 September 2019
- Prime Minister: Shinzo Abe
- Preceded by: Koichi Yamamoto
- Succeeded by: Yoshiaki Harada

Member of the House of Councillors
- In office 26 July 2004 – 25 July 2022
- Preceded by: Atsuo Nakamura
- Succeeded by: Akiko Ikuina
- Constituency: Tokyo at-large

Personal details
- Born: 22 February 1947 (age 79) Meguro, Tokyo, Japan
- Party: Liberal Democratic
- Education: University of Tokyo

Masaharu Nakagawa (中川 雅治, Nakagawa Masaharu; born 22 February 1947) is a Japanese politician of the Liberal Democratic Party, a member of the House of Councillors in the Diet (national legislature). A native of Meguro, Tokyo and graduate of the University of Tokyo, he worked at the Ministry of Finance from 1969 until 2001. He was elected to the House of Councillors for the first time in 2004.

House of Councillors
Preceded by Toshio Ogawa; Toshiko Hamayotsu; Miyo Inoue; Atsuo Nakamura	Councillor for Tokyo's At-large district 2004–present Served alongside: Toshio Ogawa, Renhō, Yūji Sawa	Incumbent
Political offices
Preceded by Koichi Yamamoto	Minister of the Environment; 2017–2018	Succeeded by Yoshiaki Harada
