= Tokyo at-large district =

Japan House of Councillors constituency

- 東京都選挙区
- Parliamentary constituency for the House of Councillors
- Prefecture: Tokyo
- Proportional Block: National PR
- Electorate: 11,558,633 (as of July 2025)

Current constituency
- Created: 1947
- Seats: 12
- Councillors: Class of 2028: Kentarō Asahi; Toshiko Takeya; Taku Yamazoe; Ayaka Shiomura; Akiko Ikuina; Vacant; Class of 2031: Daichi Suzuki; Saya; Mayu Ushida; Yūdai Kawamura; Yoshihiro Okumura; Yoshiko Kira

Tokyo at-large district (東京都選挙区, Tōkyō-to senkyo-ku) is an electoral district of the House of Councillors in the National Diet, the national legislature of Japan. The district was created in 1947 by the new Constitution of Japan and sent 8 members to the House from 1947 until 2007. From 2007 until 2016, this district sent 10 members to the House, and from 2016 onwards, the district has sent 12 councillors to the House, making it by far the largest constituency in the House of Councillors.

== Elected Councillors ==
| Class of (1947/1953/...) | | | | | | Election Year | Class of (1950/1956/...) | | | | | |
| #1 (1947: #1, 6-year term) | #2 (1947: #2, 6-year term) | #3 (1947: #3, 6-year term; 1962: #5, 3-year term) | #4 (1947: #4, 6-year term) | #5 | #6 | Election Year | #1 (1947: #5, 3-year term) | #2 (1947: #6, 3-year term) | #3 (1947: #7, 3-year term) | #4 (1947: #8, 3-year term) | #5 | #6 |
|---|---|---|---|---|---|---|---|---|---|---|---|---|
| Tatsurō Sakurauchi (DP) | Suejirō Yoshikawa (JSP) | Kiyoshi Shima (JSP) | Takeo Kurokawa (JLP) | – | – | 1947 | Kei Hoashi (Indep.) | Tamae Fukagawa (Indep.) | Masao Nishikawa (JLP) | Heiichi Tōyama (JLP) | – | – |
| Tatsurō Sakurauchi (DP) | Suejirō Yoshikawa (JSP) | Kiyoshi Shima (JSP) | Takeo Kurokawa (JLP) | – | – | 1950 | Ken Yasui (LP) | Toshiharu Shigemori (JSP) | Makoto Hori (Workers and Farmers Party) | Tamae Fukagawa (DP) | – | – |
| Takeo Kurokawa (Yoshida LP) | Fusae Ichikawa (Indep.) | Sōji Okada (JSP, left) | Kei Ishii (Yoshida LP) | – | – | 1953 | Ken Yasui (LP) | Toshiharu Shigemori (JSP) | Makoto Hori (Workers and Farmers Party) | Tamae Fukagawa (DP) | – | – |
| Takeo Kurokawa (Yoshida LP) | Fusae Ichikawa (Indep.) | Sōji Okada (JSP, left) | Kei Ishii (Yoshida LP) | – | – | 1956 | Ken Yasui (LDP) | Sanzō Nosaka (JCP) | Kiyoshi Shima (JSP) | Toshiharu Shigemori (JSP) | – | – |
| Yasu Kashiwabara (Indep.) | Fusae Ichikawa (Indep.) | Kinjirō Aikawa (LDP) | Takeo Kurokawa (LDP) | – | – | 1959 | Ken Yasui (LDP) | Sanzō Nosaka (JCP) | Kiyoshi Shima (JSP) | Toshiharu Shigemori (JSP) | – | – |
| Yasu Kashiwabara (Indep.) | Fusae Ichikawa (Indep.) | Sanzō Nosaka (JCP) (Note: Winner of the by-election by coming in 5th place during the 1962 election.) | Takeo Kurokawa (LDP) | – | – | 1962 & by-election | Ken Yasui (LDP) | Satoru Izumi (Indep.) | Kei Ishii (LDP) | Sōji Okada (JSP) | – | – |
| Sanzō Nosaka (JCP) | Hiroshi Hōjō (Kōmeitō) | Kihachirō Kimura (JSP) | Fusae Ichikawa (Indep.) | – | – | 1965 | Ken Yasui (LDP) | Satoru Izumi (Indep.) | Kei Ishii (LDP) | Sōji Okada (JSP) | – | – |
| Sanzō Nosaka (JCP) | Hiroshi Hōjō (Kōmeitō) | Kihachirō Kimura (JSP) | Fusae Ichikawa (Indep.) | – | – | 1968 | Ken’ichi Abe (Kōmeitō) | Ken Yasui (LDP) | Masatoshi Matsushita (DSP) | Hideo Urabe (JSP) | – | – |
| Bunbē Hara (LDP) | Akira Kuroyanagi (Kōmeitō) | Norio Kijima (DSP) | Sanzō Nosaka (JCP) | – | – | 1971 | Ken’ichi Abe (Kōmeitō) | Ken Yasui (LDP) | Masatoshi Matsushita (DSP) | Hideo Urabe (JSP) | – | – |
| Bunbē Hara (LDP) | Akira Kuroyanagi (Kōmeitō) | Norio Kijima (DSP) | Sanzō Nosaka (JCP) | – | – | 1974 | Ken Yasui (LDP) | Tetsu Ueda (JSP) | Ken’ichi Abe (Kōmeitō) | Kōichirō Ueda (JCP) | – | – |
| Bunbē Hara (LDP) | Akira Kuroyanagi (Kōmeitō) | Norio Kijima (DSP) | Kōji Kakizawa (NLC) | – | – | 1977 | Ken Yasui (LDP) | Tetsu Ueda (JSP) | Ken’ichi Abe (Kōmeitō) | Kōichirō Ueda (JCP) | – | – |
| Bunbē Hara (LDP) | Akira Kuroyanagi (Kōmeitō) | Norio Kijima (DSP) | Kōji Kakizawa (NLC) | – | – | 1980 | Ken Yasui (Indep.) | Tadao Miki (Kōmeitō) | Kōichirō Ueda (JCP) | Tokuma Utsunomiya(Indep.) | – | – |
| Chinpei Nozue (Tax Party) | Bunbē Hara (LDP) | Akira Kuroyanagi (Kōmeitō) | Isao Naitō (JCP) | – | – | 1983 | Ken Yasui (Indep.) | Tadao Miki (Kōmeitō) | Kōichirō Ueda (JCP) | Tokuma Utsunomiya(Indep.) | – | – |
| Chinpei Nozue (Tax Party) | Bunbē Hara (LDP) | Akira Kuroyanagi (Kōmeitō) | Isao Naitō (JCP) | – | – | 1986 | Tadao Miki (Kōmeitō) | Kiyoko Ono (LDP) | Tetsuo Tanabe (LDP) | Kōichirō Ueda (JCP) | – | – |
| Hideo Den (Indep.) | Bunbē Hara (LDP) | Chinpei Nozue (Tax Party) | Akira Kuroyanagi (Kōmeitō) | – | – | 1989 | Tadao Miki (Kōmeitō) | Kiyoko Ono (LDP) | Tetsuo Tanabe (LDP) | Kōichirō Ueda (JCP) | – | – |
| Hideo Den (Indep.) | Bunbē Hara (LDP) | Chinpei Nozue (Tax Party) | Akira Kuroyanagi (Kōmeitō) | – | – | 1992 | Toshiko Hamayotsu (Kōmeitō) | Kōichirō Ueda (JCP) | Kensaku Morita (Indep.) | Kiyoko Ono (LDP) | – | – |
| Yūichirō Uozumi (NFP) | Sanzō Hosaka (LDP) | Yasuo Ogata (JCP) | Hideo Den (Peace and Citizens Union) | – | – | 1995 | Toshiko Hamayotsu (Kōmeitō) | Kōichirō Ueda (JCP) | Kensaku Morita (Indep.) | Kiyoko Ono (LDP) | – | – |
| Yūichirō Uozumi (NFP) | Sanzō Hosaka (LDP) | Yasuo Ogata (JCP) | Hideo Den (Peace and Citizens Union) | – | – | 1998 | Toshio Ogawa (DPJ) | Toshiko Hamayotsu (Kōmeitō) | Miyo Inoue (JCP) | Atsuo Nakamura (Indep.) | – | – |
| Sanzō Hosaka (LDP) | Natsuo Yamaguchi (Kōmeitō) | Kan Suzuki (DPJ) | Yasuo Ogata (JCP) | – | – | 2001 | Toshio Ogawa (DPJ) | Toshiko Hamayotsu (Kōmeitō) | Miyo Inoue (JCP) | Atsuo Nakamura (Indep.) | – | – |
| Sanzō Hosaka (LDP) | Natsuo Yamaguchi (Kōmeitō) | Kan Suzuki (DPJ) | Yasuo Ogata (JCP) | – | – | 2004 | Masaharu Nakagawa (LDP) | Toshio Ogawa (DPJ) | Renhō (DPJ) | Yūji Sawa (Kōmeitō) | – | – |
| Masako Ōkawara (DPJ) | Natsuo Yamaguchi (Kōmeitō) | Kan Suzuki (DPJ) | Tamayo Marukawa (LDP) | Ryūhei Kawada (Indep.) | – | 2007 | Masaharu Nakagawa (LDP) | Toshio Ogawa (DPJ) | Renhō (DPJ) | Yūji Sawa (Kōmeitō) | – | – |
| Masako Ōkawara (DPJ) | Natsuo Yamaguchi (Kōmeitō) | Kan Suzuki (DPJ) | Tamayo Marukawa (LDP) | Ryūhei Kawada (Indep.) | – | 2010 | Renhō (DPJ) | Toshiko Takeya (Kōmeitō) | Masaharu Nakagawa (LDP) | Toshio Ogawa (DPJ) | Kōta Matsuda (YP) | – |
| Tamayo Marukawa (LDP) | Natsuo Yamaguchi (Kōmeitō) | Yoshiko Kira (JCP) | Tarō Yamamoto (Indep.) | Keizō Takemi (LDP) | – | 2013 | Renhō (DPJ) | Toshiko Takeya (Kōmeitō) | Masaharu Nakagawa (LDP) | Toshio Ogawa (DPJ) | Kōta Matsuda (YP) | – |
| Tamayo Marukawa (LDP) | Natsuo Yamaguchi (Kōmeitō) | Yoshiko Kira (JCP) | Tarō Yamamoto (Indep.) | Keizō Takemi (LDP) | – | 2016 | Renhō (DP) | Masaharu Nakagawa (LDP) | Toshiko Takeya (Kōmeitō) | Taku Yamazoe (JCP) | Kentarō Asahi (LDP) | Toshio Ogawa (DP) |
| Tamayo Marukawa (LDP) | Natsuo Yamaguchi (Kōmeitō) | Yoshiko Kira (JCP) | Ayaka Shiomura (CDP) | Shun Otokita (Ishin) | Keizō Takemi (LDP) | 2019 | Renhō (DP) | Masaharu Nakagawa (LDP) | Toshiko Takeya (Kōmeitō) | Taku Yamazoe (JCP) | Kentarō Asahi (LDP) | Toshio Ogawa (DP) |
| Tamayo Marukawa (LDP) | Natsuo Yamaguchi (Kōmeitō) | Yoshiko Kira (JCP) | Ayaka Shiomura (CDP) | Shun Otokita (Ishin) | Keizō Takemi (LDP) | 2022 | Kentarō Asahi (LDP) | Toshiko Takeya (Kōmeitō) | Taku Yamazoe (JCP) | Renhō (CDP) | Akiko Ikuina (LDP) | Tarō Yamamoto (Reiwa) (Note: Seat has been vacant since Yamamoto's resignation on January 21, 2026 due to poor health. No by-election has been held per the Public Offices Election Act; the threshold of one-quarter of district seats has not been met as of February 2026.) |
| Daichi Suzuki (LDP) | Saya (Sanseitō) | Mayu Ushida (DPFP) | Yūdai Kawamura (Kōmeitō) | Yoshihiro Okumura (DPFP) | Yoshiko Kira (JCP) | 2025 & by-election | Kentarō Asahi (LDP) | Toshiko Takeya (Kōmeitō) | Taku Yamazoe (JCP) | Ayaka Shiomura (CDP) (Note: Elected in 2025 by-election following Renhō's decision to run in the 2024 Tokyo gubernatorial election.) | Akiko Ikuina (LDP) | Tarō Yamamoto (Reiwa) |

== Election results ==
Notes:

- Decimals from anbunhyō ("fractional proportional votes" that stem from ambiguous votes, e.g. from ballots reading just "Suzuki") omitted in the 2016, 2013 and 2007 results
- (2016 only) (*): ineligible as runner-up replacement (kuriage-tōsen), lost deposit

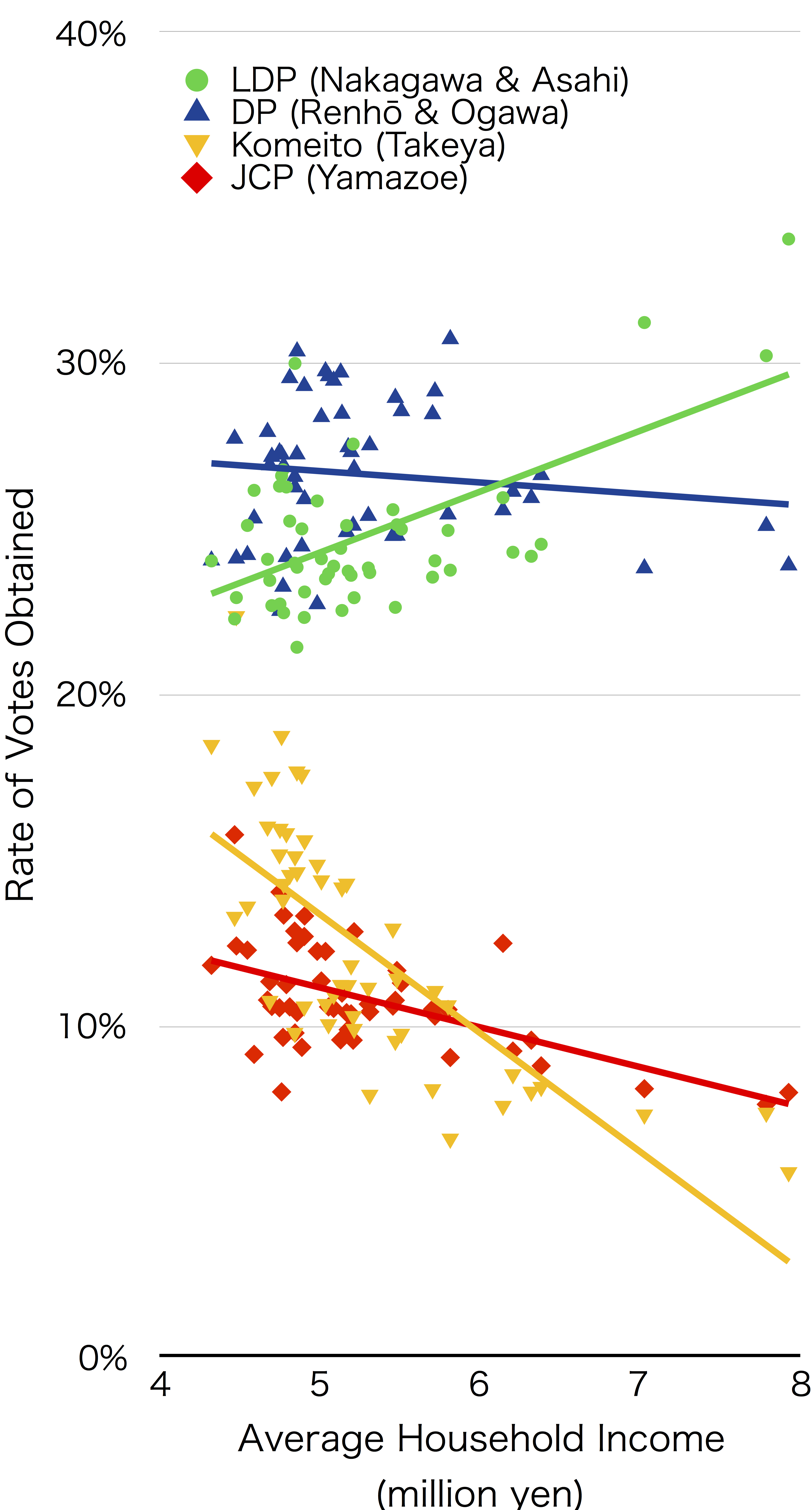
A scatter diagram showing the correlation between the rates of votes, which each major candidates obtained, and average household income in each municipalities. It is based on data by Tokyo Metropolitan Government Election Administration Commission and Statistics Japan. Two candidates from LDP (green) are more supported in municipalities, where average household income is higher, while Takeya from Komeito (yellow) is more supported where average household income is lower.

=== Elections in the 2020s ===
2025: Tokyo at-large 6 seats + 1 by-election
| Party | Candidate | Votes | % | ±% |
|---|---|---|---|---|
| LDP | Daichi Suzuki | 772,272 | 11.09 | ▼3.61 |
| Sanseitō | Saya | 668,568 | 9.60 | ▲7.4 |
| DPP | Mayu Ushida | 634,304 | 9.11 | new |
| Komeito | Yūdai Kawamura | 606,181 | 8.71 | ▼3.09 |
| DPP | Yoshihiro Okumura | 585,948 | 8.42 | new |
| JCP | Yoshiko Kira | 562,443 | 8.08 | ▼2.82 |
| CDP | Ayaka Shiomura | 517,885 | 7.44 | ▼3.16 |
| Ishin | Shun Otokita | 382,996 | 5.50 | ▼2.90 |
| CDP | Masayoshi Okumura | 368,067 | 5.29 | ▼0.61 |
| LDP | Keizō Takemi | 355,369 | 5.10 | ▼4.70 |
| CPJ | Eiji Kosaka | 276,097 | 3.97 | new |
| Team Mirai | Yūya Mineshima | 250,539 | 3.60 | new |
| Reiwa | Joji Yamamoto | 243,092 | 3.49 | ▼5.4 |
| Independent | Uryū Hirano | 235,411 | 3.38 | new |
| Saisei no Michi | Aya Yoshida | 128,746 | 1.85 | new |
| Independent | Shiori Yamao | 106,230 | 1.53 | new |
| Social Democratic | Miyuka Nishi | 80,552 | 1.16 | ▲0.16 |
| Anti-NHK | Yukito Ishimuru | 36,169 | 0.52 | ▼0.28 |
| Independent | Eri Yoshizawa | 34,075 | 0.49 | new |
| Seishinkai | Hitoshi Chiba | 32,516 | 0.47 | new |
| Independent | Kentarō Tsuji | 26,675 | 0.38 | new |
| Independent | Ai Yoshinaga | 15,379 | 0.22 | new |
| Independent | Kenji Takahashi | 8,284 | 0.12 | new |
| Independent | Kenshin Doi | 6,636 | 0.10 | new |
| Anti-NHK | Tomotoro Sakai | 6,292 | 0.09 | Steady |
| Reform Party of Japan | Hiroaki Fujikawa | 5,125 | 0.07 | new |
| Independent | Noburu Masuda | 4,169 | 0.06 | new |
| New Party Yamato | Riku Shibuya | 3,885 | 0.06 | new |
| Reform Party of Japan | Takeshima Ichikawa | 3,483 | 0.05 | new |
| Saigo Party | Mikio Hayakawa | 1,805 | 0.03 | new |
| Nuclear Fusion Party | Yasufumi Kuwajima | 1,611 | 0.02 | Steady |
| World Peace Party | Yasuhiro Fukumura | 1,494 | 0.02 | new |
| Turnout | | | 61.53 | ▲4.98 |
| Registered electors | | 11,558,633 | | |
| Party total seats | | Won | Total | Change |
| Liberal Democratic | | 1 | 3 | ▼1 |
| Democratic Party For the People | | 2 | 2 | ▲2 |
| Communist | | 1 | 2 | Steady |
| Komeitō | | 1 | 2 | Steady |
| Constitutional Democratic | | 1 | 1 | ▼1 |
| Sanseitō | | 1 | 1 | ▲1 |
| Reiwa | | 0 | 1 | Steady |
| Ishin no Kai | | 0 | 0 | ▼1 |
| Total | | 7 | 12 | |

2022
| Party | Candidate | Votes | % | ±% |
|---|---|---|---|---|
| LDP | Kentaro Asahi | 922,783 | 14.7 | ▼5.2 |
| Komeito | Toshiko Takeya | 742,968 | 11.8 | ▼2.4 |
| JCP | Taku Yamazoe | 685,224 | 10.9 | ▼1.4 |
| CDP | Renhō | 670,339 | 10.6 | ▼1.4 |
| LDP | Akiko Ikuina | 619,792 | 9.8 | New |
| Reiwa | Tarō Yamamoto | 565,925 | 9.0 | New |
| Ishin | Yuki Ebisawa | 530,861 | 8.4 | ▼0.7 |
| CDP | Akihiro Matsuo | 372,064 | 5.9 | New |
| Independent | Hirotada Ototake | 322,904 | 5.1 | New |
| Tomin First | Chiharu Araki | 284,629 | 4.5 | New |
| Sanseitō | Mio Kawanashi | 137,692 | 2.2 | New |
| Social Democratic | Ryūichi Hattori | 59,365 | 1.0 | New |
| Anti-NHK | Miki Matsuda | 53,032 | 0.8 | New |
| Children's Party | Yōhei Saiki | 50,661 | 0.8 | New |
| Japan Reform Party | Ryōji Kutsuzawa | 46,641 | 0.7 | New |
| Republican Party | Mana Tamura | 28,408 | 0.4 | New |
| Happiness Realization | Yukihisa Oikawa | 25,209 | 0.4 | New |
| Ishin Seito Shimpu | Kenji Kōno | 22,306 | 0.4 | New |
| Kunimori Conservative Party | Hiroshi Ando | 20,758 | 0.3 | New |
| Anti-NHK | Ken Tanaka | 19,287 | 0.3 | New |
| Metaverse Party | Teruki Gotō | 19,100 | 0.3 | New |
| Japan First | Miyuki Sugawara | 17,020 | 0.3 | New |
| Free Republican Party | Masayuki Aoyama | 14,845 | 0.2 | New |
| Anti-NHK | Yōhei Hasegawa | 13,341 | 0.2 | New |
| Anti-NHK | Keiji Ino | 10,150 | 0.2 | New |
| Anti-NHK | Kenji Setta | 9,658 | 0.1 | New |
| Independent | Takahashi Nakamura | 7,417 | 0.1 | New |
| Independent | Tomoharu Nakagawa | 7,203 | 0.1 | New |
| Smile Party | Hiroshi Komiyama | 5,408 | 0.1 | New |
| Peace Party | Hisao Naitō | 3,559 | 0.1 | New |
| Independent | Fumimisa Aburai | 3,370 | 0.1 | New |
| Tenmei Party | Haruhiko Kobata | 3,283 | 0.1 | New |
| Party to take over U.S. military base in Okinawa to Tokyo | Midori Nakamura | 3,043 | 0.1 | New |
| Nuclear Fusion Party | Yasufumi Kuwajima | 1,913 | 0.0 | New |
| Registered electors | | 11,454,822 | | |
| Turnout | | 6,477,702 | 56.6 | ▲4.8 |
| LDP gain from Democratic | | Swing | ▼2.6 | |
| Komeito gain from LDP | | Swing | ▼1.6 | |
| JCP gain from Komeito | | Swing | ▼0.7 | |
| CDP gain from JCP | | Swing | ▼5.8 | |
| LDP hold | | Swing | New | |
| Reiwa gain from Democratic | | Swing | New | |

=== Elections in the 2010s ===
2019
| Party | Candidate | Votes | % | ±% |
|---|---|---|---|---|
| LDP | Tamayo Marukawa | 1,143,458 | 19.9 | ▲1.0 |
| Komeito | Natsuo Yamaguchi | 815,445 | 14.2 | 0.0 |
| JCP | Yoshiko Kira | 706,532 | 12.3 | ▼0.2 |
| CDP | Ayaka Shiomura | 688,234 | 12.0 | New |
| Ishin | Shun Otokita | 526,575 | 9.2 | New |
| LDP | Keizō Takemi | 525,302 | 9.1 | ▼1.8 |
| CDP | Issei Yamagishi | 496,347 | 8.6 | New |
| Reiwa | Yoshimasa Nohara | 214,438 | 3.7 | New |
| Democratic Party for the People | Motoko Mizuno | 186,667 | 3.2 | New |
| Anti-NHK | Masanobu Ōhashi | 129,628 | 2.2 | New |
| Independent | Chinpei Nozue | 91,194 | 1.6 | |
| Social Democratic | Reiko Asakura | 86,355 | 1.5 | New |
| Happiness Realization | Hiroko Nanami | 34,121 | 0.6 | New |
| Assembly to Consider Euthanasia | Hitoshi Satō | 26,958 | 0.5 | New |
| Assembly to Consider Euthanasia | Masahiro Yokoyama | 23,582 | 0.4 | New |
| Olive Tree | Koichi Mizoguchi | 18,123 | 0.3 | New |
| Independent | Jun Mori | 15,475 | 0.3 | New |
| Independent | Yasuhiro Sekiguchi | 9,686 | 0.2 | New |
| Independent | Teikichi Nishino | 9,562 | 0.2 | New |
| Independents of Japan | Kikuo Ōtsuka | 3,586 | 0.1 | New |
| Registered electors | | 11,396,789 | | |
| Turnout | | 5,900,118 | 51.8 | ▼5.7 |
| LDP hold | | Swing | ▲4.1 | |
| Komeito hold | | Swing | ▲0.4 | |
| JCP hold | | Swing | ▼0.1 | |
| CDP gain from Independent | | Swing | New | |
| Ishin gain from LDP | | Swing | New | |
| LDP win (new seat) | | | | |

2016
| Party | Candidate | Votes | % | ±% |
|---|---|---|---|---|
| Democratic | Renhō | 1,123,145 | 18.0 | ▼10.1 |
| LDP | Masaharu Nakagawa | 884,823 | 14.2 | ▲2.5 |
| Komeito | Toshiko Takeya | 770,535 | 12.4 | ▼0.8 |
| JCP | Taku Yamazoe | 665,835 | 10.7 | New |
| LDP | Kentarō Asahi | 644,799 | 10.4 | New |
| Democratic | Toshio Ogawa | 508,131 | 8.2 | ▼3.5 |
| Ishin | Yasuo Tanaka | 469,314 | 7.5 | New |
| Independent | Katsuhito Yokokume | 310,133 | 5.0 | New |
| Independent | Yōhei Miyake | 257,036 | 4.1 | New |
| Japanese Kokoro | Mariko Suzuki | 102,402 | 1.6 | New |
| Social Democratic | Ren Masuyama | 93,677 | 1.5 | New |
| Voice of Popular Anger | Kōki Kobayashi | 82,357 | 1.3 | New |
| Independent | Kaori Satō | 67,535 | 1.1 | New |
| New Renaissance | Saya Takagi (Note: Her real name is Ikue Matsudo, however she ran under her stage name of Saya Takagi) | 60,431 | 1.0 | New |
| Ishin Seito Shimpu | Nobuyuki Suzuki | 42,858 | 0.7 | ▼0.7 |
| Independent | Kazuyuki Hamada | 28,403 | 0.5 | New |
| Happiness Realization | Tokuma | 20,412 | 0.3 | New |
| Independent | Tatsuo Suzuki | 16,187 | 0.3 | New |
| Independent | Hidetoshi Yanagaisawa | 12,091 | 0.2 | New |
| Shiji Seitō Nashi | Hitoshi Satō | 7,853 | 0.1 | New |
| Independent | Yoshihisa Yokobori | 7,329 | 0.1 | New |
| World Economic Community Party | Mitsuo Matayoshi | 6,114 | 0.1 | New |
| Independent | Kōji Kawakami | 5,812 | 0.1 | New |
| Peace | Katsuko Inamura | 5,388 | 0.1 | New |
| Shiji Seitō Nashi | Fumihiko Otsuki | 5,377 | 0.1 | New |
| Independent | Yukio Iwasaka | 5,184 | 0.1 | New |
| Independent | Kimiaki Harada | 5,017 | 0.1 | New |
| Shiji Seitō Nashi | Takashi Fukae | 4,497 | 0.1 | New |
| World Peace Party | Kenji Himeji | 3,854 | 0.1 | New |
| Shiji Seitō Nashi | Ryōji Samejima | 3,714 | 0.1 | New |
| Challenged Nippon | Hiroyuki Fujishiro | 3,296 | 0.1 | New |
| Registered electors | | 11,157,991 | | |
| Turnout | | 6,415,845 | 57.5 | ▲4.0 |
| Democratic gain from Democratic | | | | |
| LDP gain from Komeito | | | | |
| Komeito gain from LDP | | | | |
| JCP gain from Democratic | | | | |
| LDP gain from Your | | | | |
| Democratic win (new seat) | | | | |

2013
| Party | Candidate | Votes | % | ±% |
|---|---|---|---|---|
| LDP | Tamayo Marukawa | 1,064,660 | 18.9 | +7.2 |
| Komeito | Natsuo Yamaguchi | 797,811 | 14.2 | +0.7 |
| JCP | Yoshiko Kira | 703,901 | 12.5 | New |
| Independent | Tarō Yamamoto | 666,684 | 11.8 | New |
| LDP | Keizō Takemi | 612,388 | 10.9 | New |
| Democratic | Kan Suzuki | 552,714 | 9.8 | −3.4 |
| Restoration | Jun Ogura | 413,637 | 7.3 | New |
| Your | Rowland Kirishima | 320,857 | 5.7 | New |
| Independent | Masako Ōkawara (Note: Originally nominated by the DPJ, but the nomination due to her refusal to move to the proportional representation district since she was doing worse in the party survey, and so ran as an independent) | 236,953 | 4.2 | −14.2 |
| Ishin Seito Shimpu | Nobuyuki Suzuki | 77,465 | 1.4 | +1.0 |
| Green Wind | Yasuko Maruko | 70,571 | 1.3 | New |
| Independent | Yoshirō Nakamatsu | 48,362 | 0.9 | −0.7 |
| Happiness Realization | Ryōko Shaku | 20,137 | 0.4 | New |
| Independent | Katsuko Inomaru | 12,683 | 0.2 | New |
| Smile Party | Mac Akasaka | 12,228 | 0.2 | +0.1 |
| Independent | Kiyoshi Mori | 6,432 | 0.1 | 0 |
| Independent | Minoru Matsumoto | 6,123 | 0.1 | New |
| Independent | Takashi Nakamura | 6,033 | 0.1 | New |
| World Economic Community Party | Mitsuo Matayoshi | 5,633 | 0.1 | 0.0 |
| Independent | Teikichi Nishino | 3,103 | 0.1 | New |
| Turnout | | 5,767,098 | 53.5 | −5.2 |
| LDP gain from Democratic | | | | |
| Komeito hold | | | | |
| JCP gain from Democratic | | | | |
| Independent gain from LDP | | | | |
| LDP gain from Independent | | | | |

2010
| Party | Candidate | Votes | % | ±% |
|---|---|---|---|---|
| Democratic | Renhō | 1,710,734 | 28.1 | |
| Komeito | Toshiko Takeya | 806,862 | 13.2 | |
| LDP | Masaharu Nakagawa | 711,171 | 11.7 | |
| Democratic | Toshio Ogawa | 696,672 | 10.8 | |
| Your | Kōta Matsuda | 656,029 | 9.1 | |
| JCP | Akira Koike | 552,187 | 9.1 | |
| LDP | Yukiko Tōkai | 299,353 | 4.9 | |
| Ishin | Hiroshi Yamada | 200,692 | 3.3 | |
| Sunrise | Asako Ogura | 120,023 | 2.0 | |
| Social Democratic | Hideo Moirihara | 95,685 | 1.6 | |
| New Renaissance | Kōtarō Umiji | 79,828 | 1.6 | |
| People's New | Seori Egi | 53,948 | 0.9 | |
| Independent | Yūmi Ishihara | 45,405 | 0.7 | |
| Independent | Hiroko Tanaka | 16,340 | 0.3 | |
| Happiness Realization | Hissho Yanai | 10,496 | 0.2 | |
| Independent | Shoji Ogawa | 8,677 | 0.1 | |
| Smile Party | Mac Akasaka | 7,599 | 0.1 | |
| Independent | Minoru Matsumoto | 5.889 | 0.1 | |
| Independent | Tetsuo Sawada | 5,636 | 0.1 | |
| World Economic Community Party | Mitsuo Matayoshi | 4,900 | 0.1 | |
| Shinto Honshitsu | Hidemitsu Sano | 3,662 | 0.1 | |
| Independent | Kenji Himeji | 2,280 | 0.0 | |
| Shinto Freeway Club | Hidenori Wago | 1,893 | 0.0 | |
| Akitsu Shinto | Akitoshi Saka | 1,816 | 0.0 | |
| Turnout | | 6,234,137 | 58.7 | +0.8 |
| Democratic hold | | | | |
| Komeito hold | | | | |
| LDP hold | | | | |
| Democratic hold | | | | |
| Your win (new seat) | | | | |

=== Elections in the 2000s ===
2007
| Party | Candidate | Votes | % | ±% |
|---|---|---|---|---|
| Democratic | Masako Ōkawara | 1,087,453 | 18.4 | |
| Komeito | Katsuo Yamaguchi | 794,936 | 13.5 | |
| Democratic | Kan Suzuki | 780,662 | 13.2 | |
| LDP | Tamayo Murakawa | 691,367 | 11.7 | |
| Independent | Ryūhei Kawada | 683,629 | 11.6 | |
| LDP | Sanzo Hosaka | 651,484 | 11.0 | |
| JCP | Tomoko Tamura | 554,104 | 9.4 | |
| Social Democratic | Hitomi Sugiura | 209,053 | 3.5 | |
| People's New | Keiichiro Nakamura | 151,715 | 2.6 | |
| Independent | Dr. Nakamatsu | 92,512 | 1.6 | |
| Kyosei Shinto | Kisho Kurokawa | 70,275 | 1.2 | |
| Independent | Yūko Tōjō | 59,607 | 1.0 | |
| Ishin Seito Shimpu | Nobuyuki Suzuki | 21,548 | 0.4 | |
| Halve Parliament | Kikuo Suda | 18,448 | 0.3 | |
| Independent | Toshiaki Kanda | 11,222 | 0.2 | |
| Independent | Tetsuo Arai | 8,409 | 0.1 | |
| Independent | Tetsuo Sawada | 7,682 | 0.1 | |
| Smile Party | Mac Akasaka | 6,408 | 0.1 | |
| World Economic Community Party | Mitsuo Matayoshi | 5,289 | 0.1 | |
| Shinto Freeway Club | Hidenori Wago | 3,420 | 0.1 | |
| Turnout | | 6,043,345 | 57.9 | +1.8 |
| Democratic gain from LDP | | | | |
| Komeito hold | | | | |
| Democratic hold | | | | |
| LDP gain from JCP | | | | |
| Independent win (new seat) | | | | |

2004
| Party | Candidate | Votes | % | ±% |
|---|---|---|---|---|
| LDP | Masaharu Nakagawa | 1,014,293 | 18.3 | |
| Democratic | Toshio Ogawa | 991,477 | 17.9 | |
| Democratic | Renho | 924,643 | 16.7 | |
| Komeito | Yuji Sawa | 827,091 | 14.9 | |
| Independent | Yukio Aoshima | 596,272 | 10.7 | |
| JCP | Junichiro Imamura | 453,287 | 8.2 | |
| Independent | Shomei Masumoto | 381,771 | 6.9 | |
| Social Democratic | Naoto Nakagawa | 176,289 | 3.2 | |
| Independent | Tetsu Ueda | 165,551 | 3.0 | |
| Ishin Seito Shimpu | Hisayoshi Matsumara | 10,479 | 0.2 | |
| World Economic Community Party | Mitsuo Matayoshi | 8,382 | 0.2 | |
| Turnout | | 5,671,608 | 56.1 | +2.8 |
| LDP gain from Democratic | | | | |
| Democratic gain from Komeito | | | | |
| Democratic gain from JCP | | | | |
| Komeito gain from Independent | | | | |

2001
| Party | Candidate | Votes | % | ±% |
|---|---|---|---|---|
| LDP | Hosaka Sanzo | 1,407,437 | 27.9 | |
| Komeito | Yamaguchi Natsuo | 881,314 | 17.5 | |
| Democratic | Hiroshi Suzuki | 759.110 | 15.1 | |
| JCP | Yasuo Ogata | 630,196 | 12.5 | |
| Liberal | Nobuhiko Endo | 361,965 | 7.2 | |
| Independent | Megumi Hata | 210,806 | 4.2 | |
| Independent | Tetsu Ueda | 209,806 | 4.2 | |
| Independent | Chitsuko Kuroiwa | 167,566 | 3.3 | |
| Social Democratic | Sadaharu Hirota | 159,226 | 3.2 | |
| Liberal League | Itaru Kobayashi | 105,720 | 2.1 | |
| Women's Party | Hanako Igarashi | 89,037 | 1.8 | |
| Independent | Shigeo Araraki | 28,232 | 0.6 | |
| Independent | Mazao Nakagawa | 14,286 | 0.3 | |
| Ishin Seito Shimpu | Naotoshi Hashimoto | 10,601 | 0.2 | |
| Independent | Toshiro Saito | 7,608 | 0.2 | |
| Turnout | | 5,256,584 | 53.3 | −4.6 |
| LDP gain from New Frontier | | | | |
| Komeito gain from LDP | | | | |
| Democratic gain from JCP | | | | |
| JCP gain from Peace and Citizens Union | | | | |

=== Elections in the 1990s ===
1998
| Party | Candidate | Votes | % | ±% |
|---|---|---|---|---|
| Democratic | Toshio Ogawa | 1,026,797 | 19.2 | |
| Komeito | Toshiko Hamayotsu | 896,890 | 16.8 | |
| JCP | Miyo Inoue | 896,890 | 16.8 | |
| Independent | Atsuo Nakamura | 719,203 | 13.4 | |
| LDP | Kiyoko Ono | 623,483 | 11.7 | |
| LDP | Koji Tsukahara | 451,016 | 8.4 | |
| Independent | Tetsu Ueda | 227,790 | 4.3 | |
| Social Democratic | Shunsuke Iwasaki | 204,479 | 3.8 | |
| Women's Party | Hiroko Suzuki | 43,325 | 0.8 | |
| Liberal League | Nobutaro Taka | 41,182 | 0.8 | |
| Sports & Peace | Yoshimori Inoki | 37,649 | 0.7 | |
| New Socialist | Eiko Toyama | 35,860 | 0.7 | |
| Youth Liberal Party | Isao Nakamura | 34,118 | 0.6 | |
| Liberal Republican | Shogoro Sawada | 5,991 | 0.1 | |
| Independent | Toshiro Saito | 5,478 | 0.1 | |
| Sports & Peace | Takeshi Hatanaka | 5,445 | 0.1 | |
| Independent | Hirokuni Suga | 4,714 | 0.1 | |
| Ishin Seito Shimpu | Hisayoshi Matsumura | 4,108 | 0.1 | |
| Ishin Seito Shimpu | Mika Takazawa | 3,286 | 0.1 | |
| Independent | Susumu Saito | 3,220 | 0.1 | |
| Sports & Peace | Makoto Ozeki | 3,056 | 0.1 | |
| Sports and Peace Party | Ruriko Shikama | 1,965 | 0.04 | |
| Japan National Political Union | Sadaharu Akaishi | 1,682 | 0.03 | |
| Turnout | | 5,542,728 | 57.9 | +15.6 |
| Democratic gain from Kōmeitō | | | | |
| Kōmeitō gain from JCP | | | | |
| JCP gain from Independent | | | | |
| Independent gain from LDP | | | | |

1995
| Party | Candidate | Votes | % | ±% |
|---|---|---|---|---|
| New Frontier | Yuichiro Uozumi | 1,059,582 | 27.7 | |
| LDP | Hosaka Sanzo | 607,470 | 15.9 | |
| JCP | Yasuo Ogata | 475,647 | 12.5 | |
| Peace and Citizens Union | Hideo Den | 435,773 | 11.4 | |
| NP-Sakigake | Atsuo Nakamura | 404,409 | 10.6 | |
| Independent | Mieko Mishiro | 395,690 | 10.4 | |
| Independent | Kikuo Suzuki | 193,161 | 5.1 | |
| Independent | Dr. Nakamatsu | 101,547 | 2.7 | |
| Qingdao Cheering Squad | Yoshiki Yamaga | 18,620 | 0.5 | |
| Solidarity of Constitutional Green Farming | Ken Ogata | 17,810 | 0.5 | |
| Women's Party | Hiroko Suzuki | 14,588 | 0.4 | |
| Japan Welfare Party | Etsuko Fukuoka | 5,864 | 0.2 | |
| Independent | Hiroshi Suzuki | 4,823 | 0.1 | |
| New Liberal Club | Narinobu Takahashi | 4,712 | 0.1 | |
| New Liberal Club | Shuji Sekiguchi | 4,572 | 0.1 | |
| Citizens and Farmers Union of Green and Life | Yoichi Shindo | 4,424 | 0.1 | |
| All Japan Drivers Club | Yukio Hashimoto | 3,734 | 0.1 | |
| New Liberal Party | Kazumi Ishizu | 3,401 | 0.1 | |
| Independent | Yoshiharu Yamada | 3,195 | 0.1 | |
| Education Party | Noriko Kojima | 2,937 | 0.1 | |
| Japan Welfare Party | Yasuo Mizutani | 2,930 | 0.1 | |
| Japan Welfare Party | Tokiyo Yamakita | 2,776 | 0.1 | |
| Independent | Shinichi Koyama | 2,723 | 0.1 | |
| Independent | Setsuo Yamaguchi | 2,571 | 0.1 | |
| Japan Welfare Party | Watanabe Keikichiro | 2,403 | 0.1 | |
| Independent | Masao Hosokawa | 2,380 | 0.1 | |
| All Japan Drivers Club | Masateru Niimura | 2,199 | 0.1 | |
| Freedom and Expression | Hiromi Yajima | 1,954 | 0.1 | |
| Kokuminto | Shigeko Matsumoto | 1,950 | 0.1 | |
| Freedom and Expression Party | Senkichi Miyazawa | 1,845 | 0.1 | |
| Freedom and Expression Party | Senkichi Miyazawa | 1,752 | 0.1 | |
| All Japan Drivers Club | Shunji Iihama | 1,738 | 0.1 | |
| Freedom and Expression Party | Senkichj Miyazawa | 1,752 | 0.1 | |
| Freedom and Expression Party | Mitsuo Yada | 1,646 | 0.04 | |
| education party | Minoru Fukui | 1,626 | 0.04 | |
| Commoner Party | Masaru Ishiguro | 1,580 | 0.04 | |
| Free Work Union | Toshiya Yoshida | 1,446 | 0.04 | |
| Kokuminto | Takeshi Nara | 1.260 | 0.03 | |
| Kokuminto | Yoko Nakano | 1,190 | 0.03 | |
| The UFO Party of "Open Star Theory" | Kiyoshi Amamiya | 1,170 | 0.03 | |
| New Political Wind Party | Kenji Ono | 1,169 | 0.03 | |
| Japan National Political Union | Akira Oshima | 1,070 | 0.03 | |
| Commoner Party | Kenichi Hamada | 1,034 | 0.03 | |
| The UFO Party of "Open Star Theory" | Kenzan Nonaka | 982 | 0.03 | |
| Japan Social Reform Party | Fumihiko Ono | 962 | 0.03 | |
| Cultural Forum | Reiko Yasuda | 878 | 0.02 | |
| Voice of the Common People | Taiji Sato | 807 | 0.02 | |
| Mob Party | Masahiko Mori | 782 | 0.02 | |
| Kokuminto | Yoshiaki Yamazaki | 770 | 0.02 | |
| Commoner Party | Yuji Kageyama | 749 | 0.02 | |
| Japan Social Reform Party | Inui Yuka | 725 | 0.02 | |
| Voice of the Common People | Hiroshi Kamata | 721 | 0.02 | |
| Free Work Union Party | Higashi Tetsuro | 684 | 0.02 | |
| Mob Party | Tamotsu Yoshizawa | 674 | 0.02 | |
| The UFO Party of "Open Star Theory" | Hiroaki Morimitsu | 655 | 0.02 | |
| Mob Party | Hirokichi Takahashi | 647 | 0.02 | |
| Voice of the Common People | Katsuya Nitta | 642 | 0.02 | |
| Mob Party | Hideo Tsuboi | 609 | 0.02 | |
| Cultural Forum | Yukie Otsuka | 565 | 0.01 | |
| Japan Social Reform Party | Kurashige Hiroshi | 544 | 0.01 | |
| World Johrekai | Yoshiyuki Nozawa | 503 | 0.01 | |
| Japan National Political Union | Shinichiro Okada | 501 | 0.01 | |
| Japan National Political Union | Hideaki Takehara | 498 | 0.01 | |
| Cultural Party | Suzumu Saito | 487 | 0.01 | |
| New Political Wind | Mitsuyuki Asano | 478 | 0.01 | |
| Voice of the Common People | Shoichi Sasai | 478 | 0.01 | |
| Japan National Political Union | Mitsuo Enoki | 437 | 0.01 | |
| Free Work Union | Keiji Fukunaga | 430 | 0.01 | |
| New Political Winds | Akio Yanagisawa | 407 | 0.01 | |
| Cultural Forum | Hayakawa Joji | 383 | 0.01 | |
| Commoner Party | Akihiro Sakamoto | 371 | 0.01 | |
| Cultural Forum | Hanba Kiyo | 285 | 0.01 | |
| Free Work Union | Issei Okajima | 251 | 0.01 | |
| Turnout | | 3,988,069 | 42.3 | |
| New Frontier gain from Independent | | | | |
| LDP hold | | | | |
| JCP gain from Tax Party | | | | |
| Peace and Citizens Union gain from Kōmeitō | | | | |

1992
| Party | Candidate | Votes | % | ±% |
|---|---|---|---|---|
| Kōmeitō | Toshiko Hamayotsu | 902,242 | 21.8 | |
| JCP | Koichiro Ueda (Incumbent) | 756.647 | 18.2 | |
| Independent | Kensaku Morita | 716,793 | 17.3 | |
| LDP | Kiyoko Ono (Incumbent) | 671,457 | 16.2 | |
| LDP | Hajime Ogura | 597,711 | 14.4 | |
| Independent | Masatoshi Uchida | 314,291 | 7.6 | |
| Japan Welfare Party | Sangen Higashi | 27,569 | 0.7 | |
| All Japan Dtivers Club | Naoko Ito | 17,349 | 0.4 | |
| People's New | Junichi Akutsu | 15,670 | 0.4 | |
| Japan Democratic Party | Shinagawa Tsukasa | 15,286 | 0.4 | |
| New Liberal Party | Shuji Sekiguchi | 14,876 | 0.4 | |
| Turnout | | | | |
| Kōmeitō hold | | | | |
| JCP gain from LDP | | | | |
| Independent gain from LDP | | | | |
| LDP gain from JCP | | | | |

=== Elections in the 1980s ===
1989
| Party | Candidate | Votes | % | ±% |
|---|---|---|---|---|
| Independent | Hideo Den | 1,164,511 | 22.7 | |
| LDP | Bunbee Hara | 1,143,878 | 22.3 | |
| Tax Party | Nozue Shimpei | 889,633 | 17.4 | |
| Kōmeitō | Akira Kuroyanagi | 776,878 | 15.2 | |
| Turnout | | | | |
| Independent gain from Tax Party | | | | |
| LDP hold | | | | |
| Tax Party gain from Kōmeitō | | | | |
| Kōmeitō gain from JCP | | | | |

1986
| Party | Candidate | Votes | % | ±% |
|---|---|---|---|---|
| Kōmeitō | Tadao Miki (Incumbent) | 851,217 | 16.8 | |
| LDP | Kiyoko Ono | 850,441 | 16.8 | |
| LDP | Tatsuo Tanabe | 742,766 | 14.7 | |
| JCP | Koichiro Ueda (Incumbent) | 702,232 | 13.9 | |
| Turnout | | 5,329,816 | 61.1 | |
| Kōmeitō gain from LDP | | | | |
| LDP gain from Kōmeitō | | | | |
| LDP gain from JCP | | | | |
| JCP gain from Independent | | | | |

1983
| Party | Candidate | Votes | % | ±% |
|---|---|---|---|---|
| Tax Party | Nozue Shimpei (Incumbent) | 963,146 | 22.5 | |
| LDP | Bunbee Hara (Incumbent) | 938,454 | 21.9 | |
| Kōmeitō | Akira Kuroyanagi (Incumbent) | 817,387 | 19.1 | |
| JCP | Isao Naito | 551,364 | 12.9 | |
| Turnout | | 4,364,586 | 51.9 | |
| Tax Party gain from LDP | | | | |
| LDP gain from Kōmeitō | | | | |
| Kōmeitō gain from Democratic Socialist | | | | |
| JCP gain from New Liberal Club | | | | |

1980
| Party | Candidate | Votes | % | ±% |
|---|---|---|---|---|
| Independent | Ken Yasui (Incumbent) (Endorsed by the LDP) | 1,315,583 | 24.8 | |
| Kōmeitō | Tadao Miki (Incumbent) | 874,017 | 16.5 | |
| JCP | Koichiro Ueda (Incumbent) | 815,754 | 15.4 | |
| Independent | Tokuma Utsunomiya (Endorsed by the NLC and the DSP) | 813,583 | 15.3 | |
| Turnout | | 5,537,135 | 67.5 | +3.5 |
| Independent gain from LDP | | | | |
| Kōmeitō gain from Socialist | | | | |
| JCP gain from Kōmeitō | | | | |
| Independent gain from JCP | | | | |

=== Elections in the 1970s ===
1977
| Party | Candidate | Votes | % | ±% |
|---|---|---|---|---|
| LDP | Bunbee Hara | 1,245,118 | 24.9 | |
| Kōmeitō | Akira Kuroyanagi | 841,159 | 16.8 | |
| Democratic Socialist | Norio Kijima | 632,045 | 12.6 | |
| New Liberal Club | Koji Kakizawa | 580,134 | 11.6 | |
| Turnout | | 5,217,346 | 64.0 | −4.6 |
| LDP hold | | | | |
| Kōmeitō hold | | | | |
| Democratic Socialist hold | | | | |
| New Liberal Club gain from JCP | | | | |

1974
| Party | Candidate | Votes | % | ±% |
|---|---|---|---|---|
| LDP | Ken Yasui (Incumbent) | 1,268,412 | 23.5 | |
| Socialist | Tetsu Ueda | 1,111,780 | 20.6 | |
| Kōmeitō | Kenichi Abe (Incumbent) | 842,761 | 15.6 | |
| JCP | Koichiro Ueda | 819,895 | 15.2 | |
| Turnout | | 5,555,130 | 68.6 | +11.9 |
| LDP gain from Kōmeitō | | | | |
| Socialist gain from LDP | | | | |
| Kōmeitō gain from Democratic Socialist | | | | |
| JCP gain from Socialist | | | | |

1971
| Party | Candidate | Votes | % | ±% |
|---|---|---|---|---|
| LDP | Bunbee Hara | 881,104 | 20.0 | |
| Kōmeitō | Akira Kuroyanagi (Incumbent) | 773,405 | 17.5 | |
| Democratic Socialist | Norio Kijima | 714,535 | 16.2 | |
| JCP | Sanzo Nosaka | 713,903 | 16.2 | |
| Turnout | | 4,535,534 | 56.5 | −6.1 |
| LDP gain from JCP | | | | |
| Kōmeitō hold | | | | |
| Democratic Socialist gain from Socialist | | | | |
| JCP gain from Independent | | | | |

=== Elections in the 1960s ===
1968
| Party | Candidate | Votes | % | ±% |
|---|---|---|---|---|
| Kōmeitō | Kenichi Abe | 831,893 | 17.5 | |
| LDP | Ken Yasui (Incumbent) | 821,204 | 17.3 | |
| Democratic Socialist | Masatoshi Matsuhita | 702,603 | 14.8 | |
| Socialist | Hideo Urabe | 682,817 | 14.4 | |
| Turnout | | 4,908,219 | 62.6 | +1.5 |
| Kōmeitō gain from LDP | | | | |
| LDP gain from Independent | | | | |
| Democratic Socialist gain from LDP | | | | |
| Socialist hold | | | | |

1965
| Party | Candidate | Votes | % | ±% |
|---|---|---|---|---|
| JCP | Sanzo Nosaka | 619,893 | 16.0 | |
| Kōmeitō | Hiroshi Hojo | 608,235 | 15.7 | |
| Socialist | Kimura Kihachiro | 556,189 | 14.4 | |
| Independent | Fusae Ichikawa | 496,795 | 12.8 | |
| Turnout | | 4,073,539 | 61.1 | |
| JCP gain from Independent | | | | |
| Kōmeitō gain from Independent | | | | |
| Socialist gain from JCP | | | | |
| Independent gain from LDP | | | | |

1962
| Party | Candidate | Votes | % | ±% |
|---|---|---|---|---|
| LDP | Ken Yasui (Incumbent) | 794,618 | 22.8 | |
| Independent | Satoru Izumi | 529,575 | 15.2 | |
| LDP | Katsura Ishii | 506,469 | 14.5 | |
| Socialist | Souji Okada | 474,963 | 13.6 | |
| JCP | Sanzo Nosaka | 415,598 | 11.9 | |
| Turnout | | | | |
| JCP gain from LDP | | | | |
| LDP hold | | | | |
| Independent gain from JCP | | | | |
| LDP gain from Socialist | | | | |
| Socialist hold | | | | |

=== Elections in the 1950s ===
1959
| Party | Candidate | Votes | % | ±% |
|---|---|---|---|---|
| Independent | Yasu Kashiwabara | 471,472 | 19.1 | |
| Independent | Fusae Ichikawa (Incumbent) | 292,927 | 11.7 | |
| LDP | Kinjiro Ayukawa | 256,602 | 10.4 | |
| LDP | Takeo Kurokawa | 254,502 | 10.3 | |
| Turnout | | 2,565,993 | 49.4 | +0.4 |
| Independent gain from Liberal | | | | |
| Independent hold | | | | |
| LDP gain from Left Socialist | | | | |
| LDP gain from Liberal | | | | |

1956
| Party | Candidate | Votes | % | ±% |
|---|---|---|---|---|
| LDP | Ken Yasui (Incumbent) | 473,549 | 22.6 | |
| JCP | Sanzo Nosaka | 272,531 | 13.0 | |
| Socialist | Kiyoshi Shima | 255,992 | 12.2 | |
| Socialist | Toshiharu Shigemori | 240,123 | 11.5 | |
| Turnout | | 2,221,122 | 49.0 | +4.2 |
| LDP gain from Liberal | | | | |
| JCP gain from Socialist | | | | |
| Socialist gain from Workers and Farmers Party (Japan) | | | | |
| Socialist gain from Democratic | | | | |

1953
| Party | Candidate | Votes | % | ±% |
|---|---|---|---|---|
| Liberal | Takeo Kurokawa (Incumbent) | 294,181 | 17.8 | |
| Independent | Fusae Ichikawa | 191,539 | 11.6 | |
| Left Socialist | Soji Okada (Incumbent) | 185,863 | 11.2 | |
| Liberal | Kastura Ishii | 178,595 | 10.8 | |
| Turnout | | 1,794,587 | 44.8 | −9.9 |
| Liberal gain from Democratic | | | | |
| Independent gain from Socialist | | | | |
| Left Socialist gain from Socialist | | | | |
| Liberal gain from Liberal | | | | |

1950
| Party | Candidate | Votes | % | ±% |
|---|---|---|---|---|
| Liberal | Ken Yasui | 281,256 | 17.2 | |
| Socialist | Toshiharu Shigemori | 199,113 | 12.2 | |
| Workers and Farmers Party | Makoto Hori | 193,902 | 11.8 | |
| Democratic | Fukugawa Tamae | 161,341 | 9.9 | |
| Turnout | | 1,845,433 | 54.7 | +2.0 |
| Liberal gain from Independent | | | | |
| Socialist gain from Independent | | | | |
| Workers and Farmers Party (Japan) gain from Liberal | | | | |
| Democratic gain from Liberal | | | | |

=== Elections in the 1940s ===
1947
| Party | Candidate | Votes | % | ±% |
|---|---|---|---|---|
| Democratic | Tatsuro Sakurauchi | 138,705 | 11.7 | |
| Socialist | Suejiro Yoshikawa | 111,862 | 9.5 | |
| Socialist | Kiyoshi Shima | 101,128 | 8.6 | |
| Liberal | Takeo Kurokawa | 89,413 | 7.6 | |
| Independent | Kei Hoashi | 83,493 | 7.1 | |
| Independent | Fukagawa Tamae | 79,396 | 6.7 | |
| Liberal | Masao Nishikawa | 78,757 | 6.7 | |
| Liberal | Heichii Toyama | 75,637 | 6.4 | |
| Turnout | | 1,392,383 | 52.7 | N/A |
| Democratic win (new seat) | | | | |
| Socialist win (new seat) | | | | |
| Socialist win (new seat) | | | | |
| Liberal win (new seat) | | | | |
| Independent win (new seat) | | | | |
| Independent win (new seat) | | | | |
| Liberal win (new seat) | | | | |
| Liberal win (new seat) | | | | |
