= Taku Yamazoe =

Japanese politician

- 山添 拓
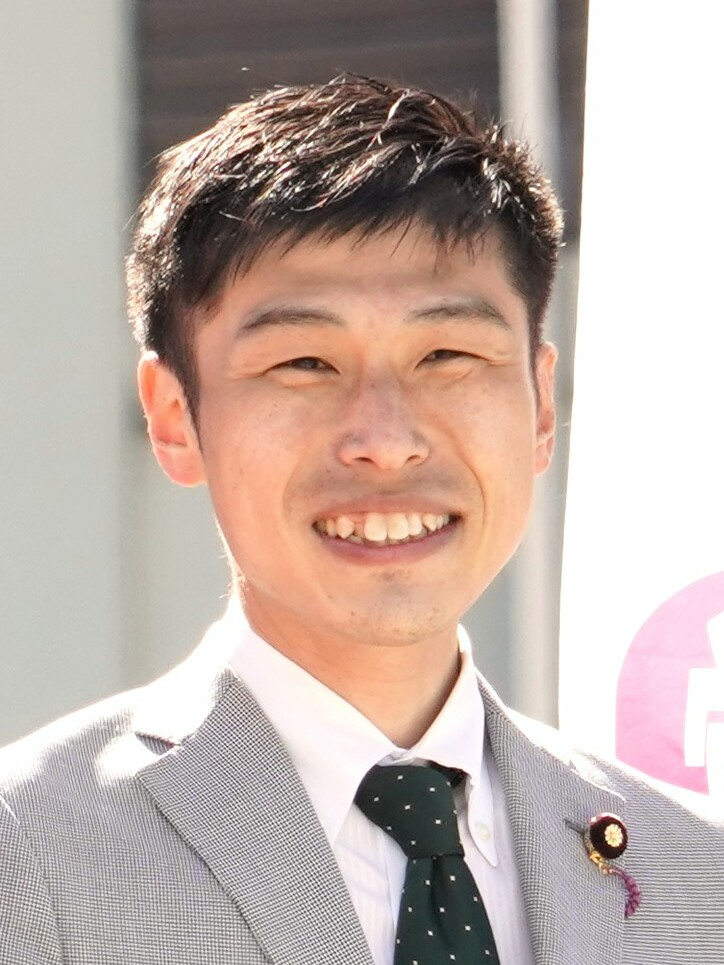
- Yamazoe in 2023

Member of the House of Councillors
- Incumbent
- Assumed office 26 July 2016
- Preceded by: Toshio Ogawa
- Constituency: Tokyo at-large

Personal details
- Born: 20 November 1984 (age 41) Mukō, Kyoto, Japan
- Party: Communist
- Education: University of Tokyo; Waseda University

Taku Yamazoe (Japanese: 山添 拓; born 20 November 1984, Muko, Kyoto) is a member of the Japanese Communist Party serving as Senator from Tokyo, where he was elected with 10.7% of the vote in 2016. He was educated at the University of Tokyo and at Waseda Law School, in 2007 and 2010 respectively. In 2010, he passed the National Bar Examination and became a lawyer in 2011. During his time as a lawyer, he represented workers that worked at the Fukushima Daiichi Nuclear Power Plant. Yamazoe is a supporter of LGBT rights.

== Railway incident ==
On 16 September 2021, police accused Yamazoe, who is a railway photography enthusiast, of having trespassed on the Chichibu Main Line on 3 November 2020. The case was ultimately dropped on 30 September 2021. The subsequent media coverage and handling of the case by the police made several media outlets speculate whether the disproportionate reportage was due to the political affiliation of Yamazoe and the medias' perception of opposition parties like the JCP.
