= Hideo Den =

Japanese politician (1923–2009)

- 田 英夫
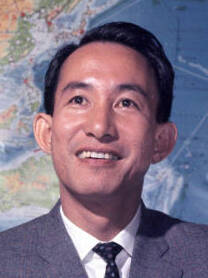
- Den in 1964

President of the Socialist Democratic Federation
- In office 26 March 1978 – 10 February 1985
- Preceded by: Position established
- Succeeded by: Satsuki Eda

Member of the House of Councillors
- In office 8 April 2003 – 28 July 2007
- Preceded by: Yōko Tajima
- Succeeded by: Multi-member district
- Constituency: National PR
- In office 4 July 1971 – 29 July 2001
- Preceded by: Multi-member district
- Succeeded by: Kan Suzuki
- Constituency: National district (1971–1983); National PR (1983–1989); Tokyo at-large (1989–2001)

Personal details
- Born: 9 June 1923 Tokyo, Japan
- Died: 13 November 2009 (aged 86) Minato, Tokyo, Japan
- Party: Social Democratic
- Other political affiliations: JSP (1971–1978); SDF (1978–1994); Independent (1994–1997)
- Relatives: Den Kenjiro (grandfather)
- Education: University of Tokyo
- Website: upp.so-net.ne.jp/dennews

Hideo Den (田 英夫 Den Hideo, June 9, 1923 - November 13, 2009) was a Japanese news presenter, politician, and for 34 of the years between 1971 and 2007, a member of the House of Councillors for the Social Democratic Party. From 1978 to 1985, he was also the president of the Socialist Democratic Federation.

In 1947 he joined the Kyodo News company as a reporter. In 1962 he became a news presenter for TBS 's television news program.

He was the grandson of Den Kenjiro.

House of Councillors
Preceded by –	Councillor by proportional representation (designated SDP PR list successor for Yōko Tajima); 2003–2007	Succeeded by –
Preceded by Chinpei Nozue; Bunbē Hara; Akira Kuroyanagi; Isao Naitō	Councillor for Tokyo's At-large district 1989–2001; Served alongside: Bunbē Hara, Chinpei Nozue, Akira Kuroyanagi, Yūichirō Uozumi, Sanzō Hosaka, Yasuo Ogata	Succeeded by Sanzō Hosaka, Natsuo Yamaguchi, Kan Suzuki, Yasuo Ogata
New title Introduction of proportional voting	Councillor by proportional representation 1983–1989	Succeeded by –
Preceded by 50-member district	Councillor for Japan's At-large district (zenkoku-ku); 1971–1983; Served alongside: numerous others	District eliminated
Party political offices
New political party	President of the Socialist Democratic Federation; 1978–1985	Succeeded by Satsuki Eda
