= Toshio Ogawa =

Japanese politician

- 小川 敏夫
- Official portrait, 2011

Vice President of the House of Councillors
- In office 1 August 2019 – 3 August 2022
- President: Akiko Santō
- Preceded by: Akira Gunji
- Succeeded by: Hiroyuki Nagahama

Minister of Justice
- In office 13 January 2012 – 4 June 2012
- Prime Minister: Yoshihiko Noda
- Preceded by: Hideo Hiraoka
- Succeeded by: Makoto Taki

Member of House of Councillors
- In office 26 July 1998 – 25 July 2022
- Preceded by: Kiyoko Ono
- Succeeded by: Taro Yamamoto
- Constituency: Tokyo at-large

Personal details
- Born: 18 March 1948 (age 78) Nerima, Tokyo, Japan
- Party: CDP (since 2018)
- Other political affiliations: NPS (1996); DP 1996 (1996–1998); DPJ (1998–2016); DP 2016 (2016–2018)
- Education: Rikkyo University

Toshio Ogawa (小川 敏夫, Ogawa Toshio; born 18 March 1948) is a Japanese politician of the Constitutional Democratic Party and a member of the House of Councillors in the Diet (national legislature). Ogawa is a former Minister of Justice. A native of Nerima, Tokyo, and a graduate of Rikkyo University, he was elected to the House of Councillors for the first time in 1998 after working as a prosecutor.

== Political career ==
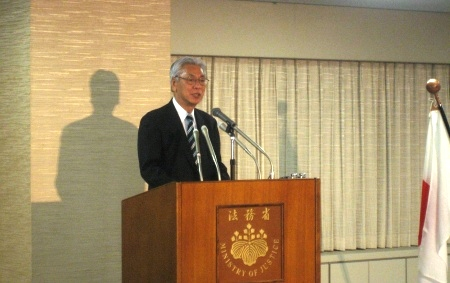
Toshio Ogawa (at the Central Government Building No.6 on January 13, 2012)

In 1996, he ran for a lower house seat with support from the Democratic Party of Japan, but failed. In 1998, he ran for an upper house election, and was elected. In 2004, he again got elected in an upper house election. In 2012, he was appointed justice minister.

He was re-elected in 2004, 2010 and 2016, and is currently the longest serving councillor from Tokyo. When the Democratic Party merged with Kibō no Tō to form the DPP in May 2018, Ogawa did not join the new party and decided to join the CDP instead.

House of Councillors
| Preceded by Toshiko Hamayotsu; Kōichirō Ueda; Kensaku Morita; Kiyoko Ono | Councillor from Tokyo; 26 July 1998–present Served alongside: Toshiko Hamayotsu, Miyo Inoue, Atsuo Nakamura, Masaharu Nakagawa, Renhō Murata, Yūji Sawa | Incumbent |
Political offices
| Preceded by Kōichi Katō | Senior Vice Minister of Justice; 2010–2011 | Succeeded by Makoto Taki |
| Preceded by Hideo Hiraoka | Minister of Justice; 13 January – 4 June 2012 | Succeeded by Makoto Taki |
