= Masako Ōkawara =

Japanese politician (born 1953)

- 大河原 雅子
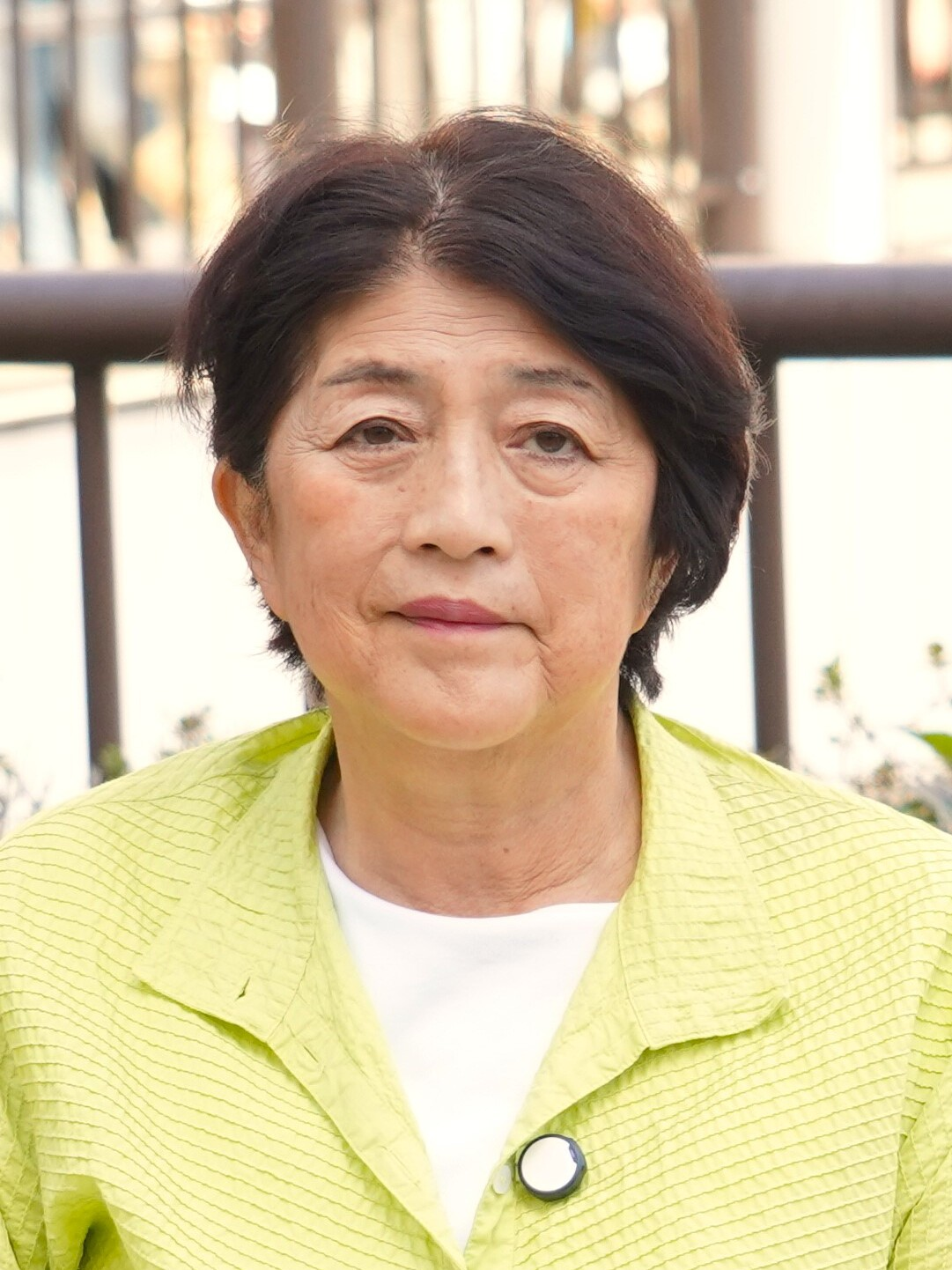
- Ōkawara in 2024

Member of the House of Representatives
- In office 27 October 2017 – 23 January 2026
- Preceded by: Multi-member district
- Succeeded by: Kiyoshi Odawara
- Constituency: Northern Kanto PR (2017–2021); Tokyo PR (2021–2024); Tokyo 21st (2024–2026)

Member of the House of Councillors
- In office 29 July 2007 – 28 July 2013
- Preceded by: Yasuo Ogata
- Succeeded by: Yoshiko Kira
- Constituency: Tokyo at-large

Member of the Tokyo Metropolitan Assembly
- In office 1999–2005
- Constituency: Setagaya Ward
- In office 1993–1997
- Constituency: Setagaya Ward

Personal details
- Born: 8 April 1953 (age 73) Yokohama, Kanagawa, Japan
- Party: CDP (since 2017)
- Other political affiliations: TSN (1993–2007); DPJ (2007–2013; 2014–2016); Independent (2013–2014); DP (2016–2017)
- Education: International Christian University
- Website: Official website

Masako Ōkawara (大河原 雅子; born 8 April 1953) is a Japanese politician of the Constitutional Democratic Party and a former member of the House of Representatives in the Diet (national legislature). A native of Yokohama in Kanagawa Prefecture and 1977 graduate of International Christian University, she had served in the assembly of Tokyo for three terms (ten years) since 1993. She was a member of the House of Councillors between 2007 and 2013.

Preceded by 17 members	Member of the House of Representatives from Kita-Kantō proportional representation block 2017– Served alongside: 16 others	Incumbent
Preceded by Sanzō Hosaka; Natsuo Yamaguchi; Kan Suzuki; Yasuo Ogata	Member of the House of Councillors from Tokyo (Class of 1947/1953/.../2007); 2007–2013; Served alongside: Natsuo Yamaguchi, Kan Suzuki, Tamayo Marukawa, Ryūhei Kawada	Succeeded by Tamayo Marukawa; Natsuo Yamaguchi; Yoshiko Kira; Tarō Yamamoto; Keizō Takemi
Preceded by 8 members	Member of the Tokyo Metropolitan Assembly from Setagaya City; 1993–1997; 1999–2005; Served alongside: 7 others	Succeeded by 8 members
