= Mayu Ushida =

Japanese politician (born 1985)

- 牛田 茉友
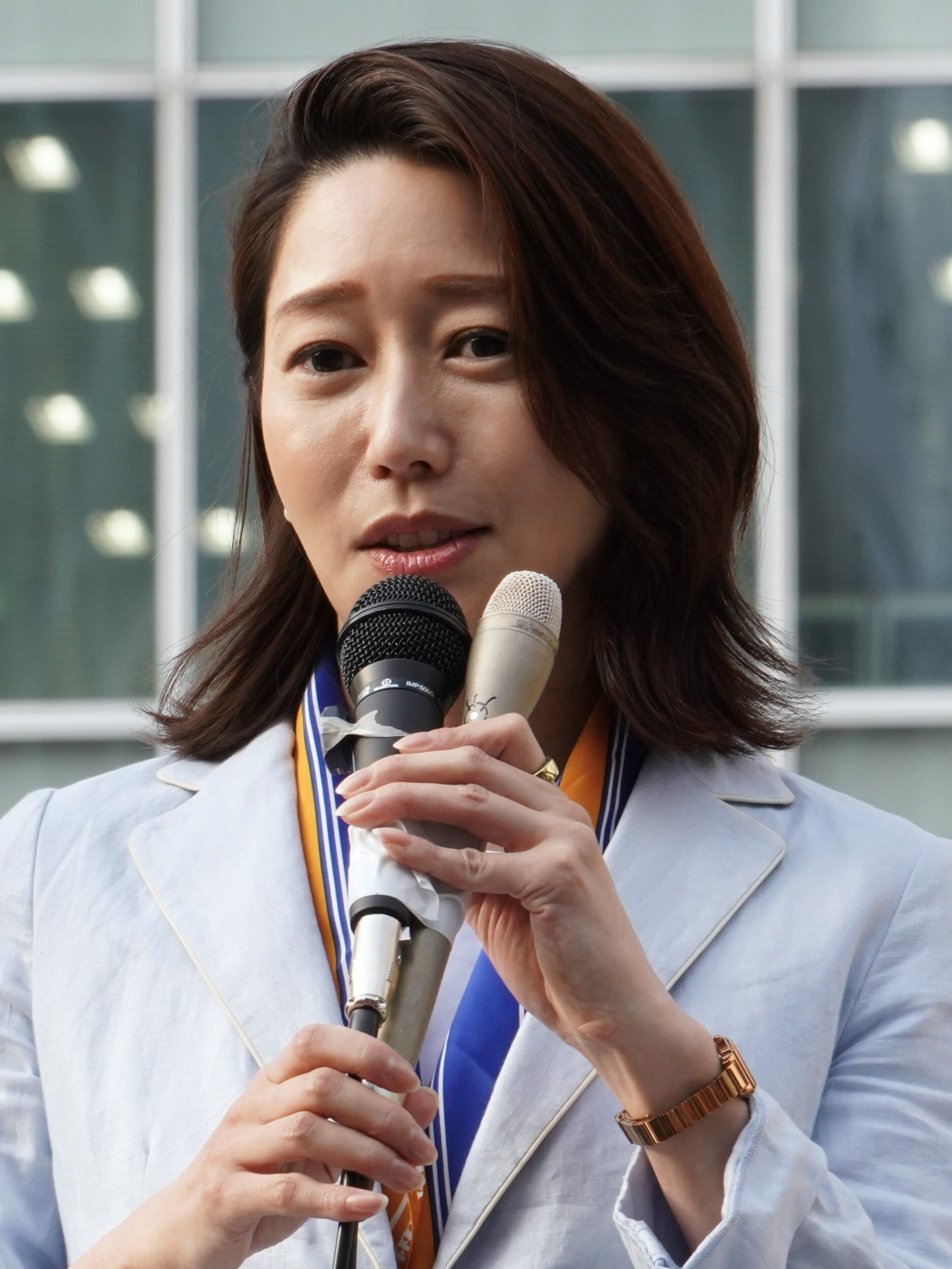
- Ushida in 2025

Member of the House of Councillors
- Incumbent
- Assumed office 29 July 2025
- Constituency: Tokyo at-large

Personal details
- Born: 8 June 1985 (age 41) Ikeda, Osaka, Japan
- Party: DPP
- Education: Osaka University

Mayu Ushida (Japanese: 牛田茉友, Hepburn: Ushida Mayu; born 8 June 1985) is a Japanese politician serving as a member of the House of Councillors since 2025. She was a television presenter at NHK from 2009 to 2025, and served as news anchor for the Nichiyō Tōron.
