= Kenichi Abe =

Japanese ace fighter pilot

- 阿部 健市
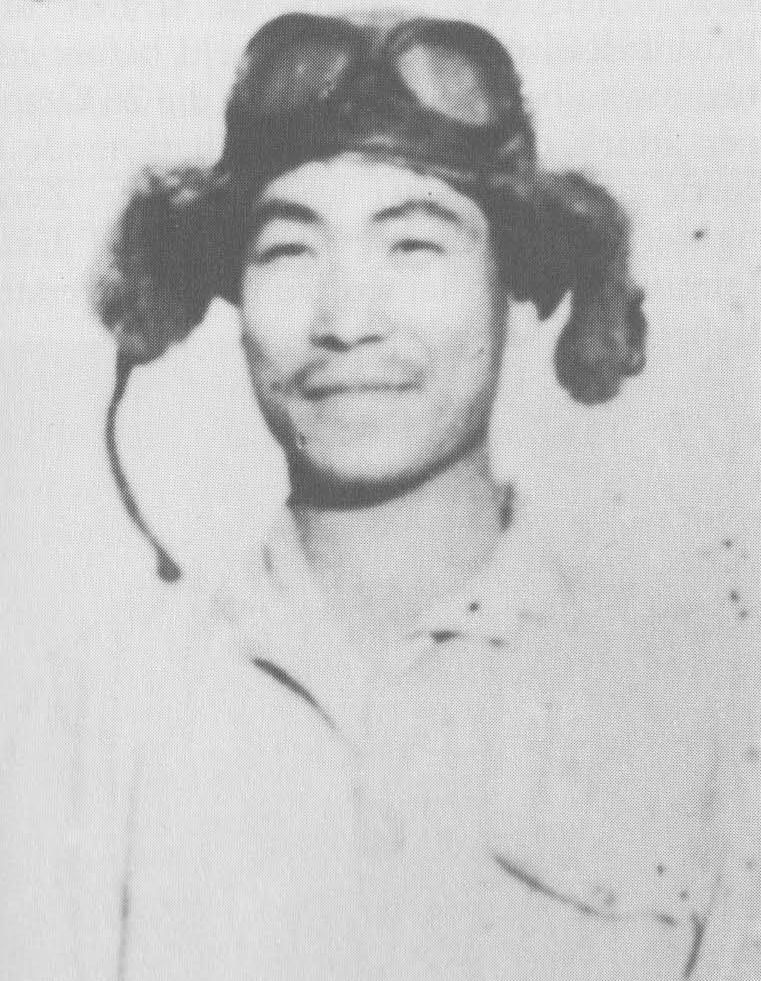
- Abe while with the Kanoya Air Group in 1942
- Born: March 1, 1923; Ōita, Japan
- Military career
- Allegiance: Empire of Japan
- Branch: (Empire of Japan) Imperial Japanese Navy Air Service
- Service years: 1941–1945
- Rank: Chief Petty Officer
- Units: Kanoya Air Group; 253rd Air Group
- Conflicts: World War II; Pacific War; Solomon Islands campaign; New Guinea campaign

Kenichi Abe (阿部 健市, Abe Ken'ichi; born 1 March 1923) was an ace fighter pilot in the Imperial Japanese Navy Air Service during World War II. In aerial combat across the Pacific theater, he was officially credited with five solo victories, five joint victories, and two probables.

As a member of the Kanoya and 253rd Air Groups based at Rabaul, Abe participated in aerial combat against Allied forces during the Solomon Islands campaign and New Guinea campaign in 1942 and 1943. Abe was injured on 6 May 1943 and returned to Japan to recuperate. Abe was still recuperating when the war ended in August 1945.
