= Yudai Kawamura =

Japanese politician (born 1984)

- 川村 雄大
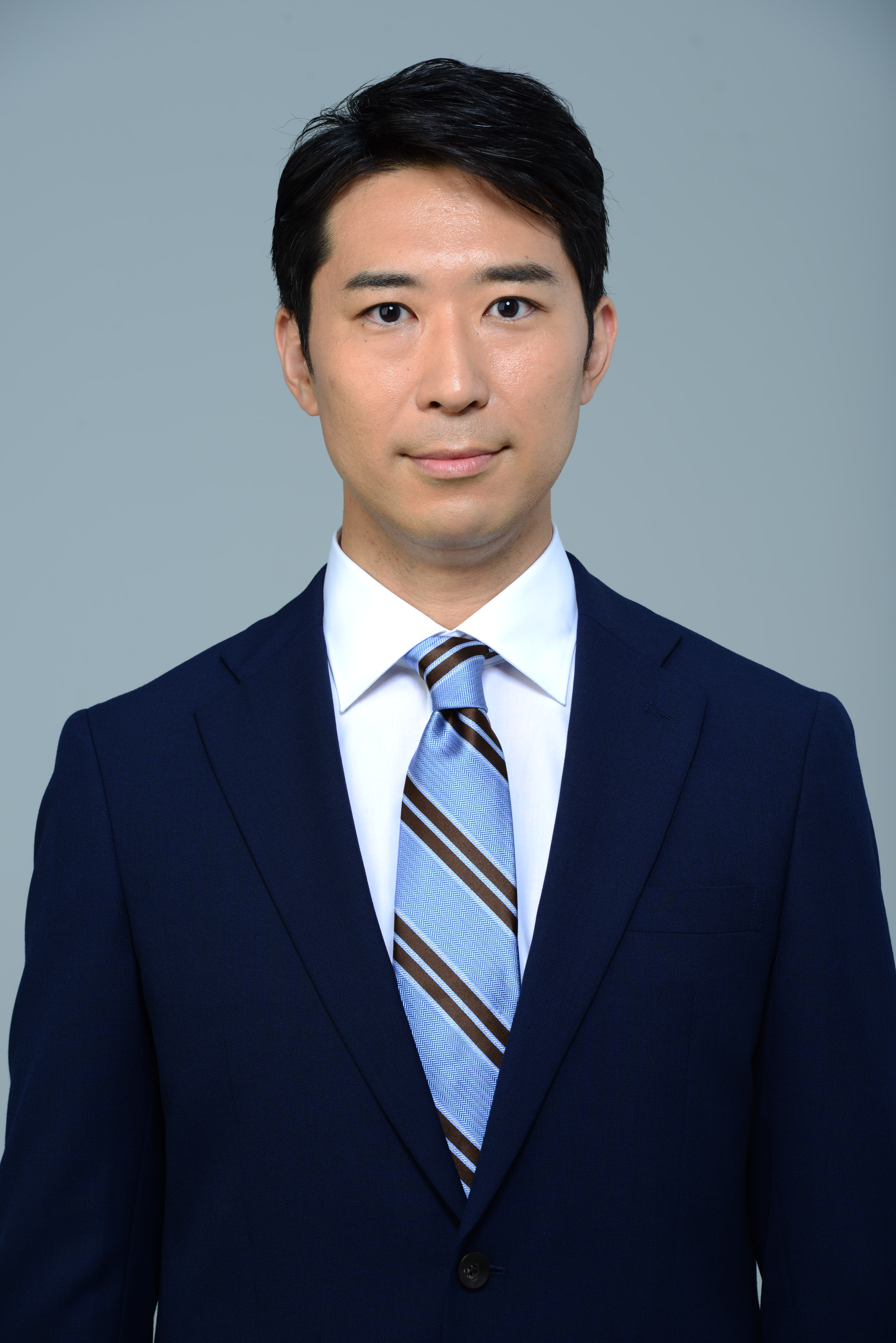
- Kawamura in 2024

Member of the House of Councillors
- Incumbent
- Assumed office 29 July 2025
- Preceded by: Natsuo Yamaguchi
- Constituency: Tokyo at-large

Personal details
- Born: 29 June 1984 (age 42) Obihiro, Hokkaido, Japan
- Party: Komeito
- Education: Tokyo Medical and Dental University

Yudai Kawamura (川村雄大, Kawamura Yūdai; born 29 June 1984) is a Japanese politician who was elected member of the House of Councillors in 2025. He previously worked as a gastrointestinal surgeon for 10 years.
