= Akiko Ikuina =

Japanese politician and entertainer (born 1968)

- 生稲 晃子
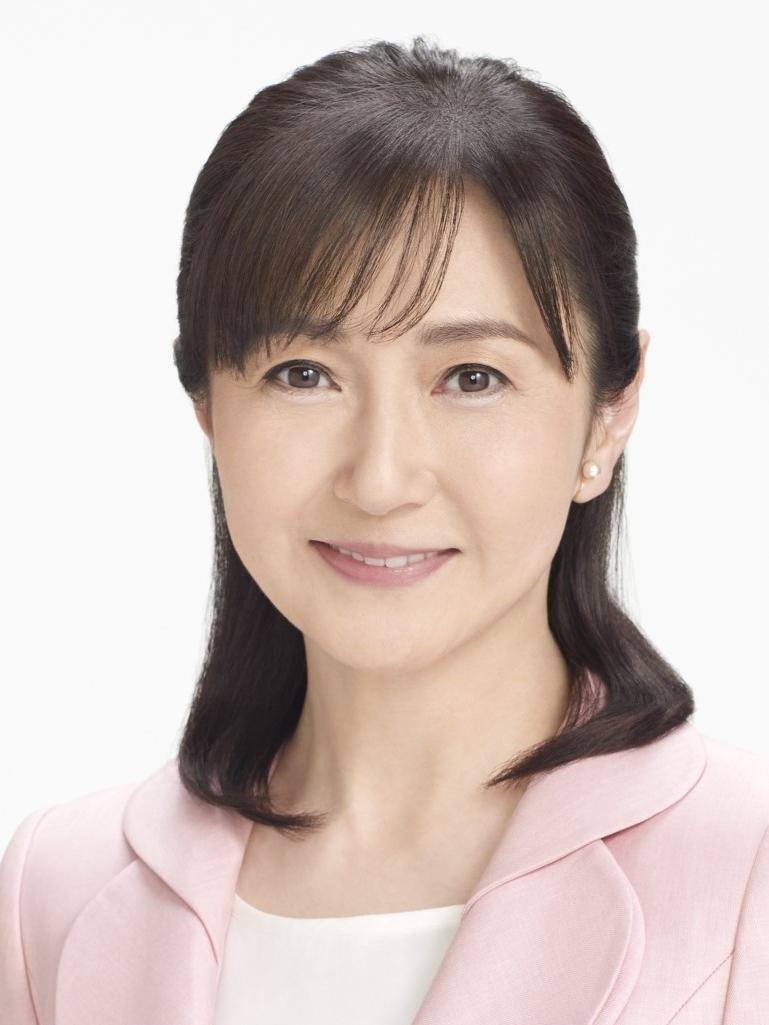
- Official portrait, 2022

Member of the House of Councillors
- Incumbent
- Assumed office 26 July 2022
- Preceded by: Masaharu Nakagawa
- Constituency: Tokyo at-large

Personal details
- Born: 28 April 1968 (age 58) Setagaya, Tokyo, Japan
- Party: Liberal Democratic
- Spouse: Tomohiro Sayama
- Education: Keisen College of Horticulture
- Occupation: Singer, actor, tarento, politician Musical career
- Genre: J-pop
- Years active: 1987–present
- Label: Production Ogi
- Website: ogipro.com/talent/ikuina/

Akiko Ikuina (生稲 晃子, Ikuina Akiko; born April 28, 1968 in Tokyo) is a Japanese singer, actress, tarento, and politician. She joined the Japanese pop idol group Onyanko Club in 1986.

== Early life and education ==
She was born in Setagaya, Tokyo, but moved to Koganei when she was a little girl. She has an elder sister and an elder brother. She was considered an honor student in elementary school. Additionally, she was a member of a local soccer club. After enrolling at Koganei Municipal Midori Junior High School (緑中学), she took up volleyball. She also became the central figure in her class, and her group was known as the Ikuina Corps (生稲軍団, Ikuina Gundan). She was nicknamed full moon (満月, Mangetsu) because of her round face. At the time, she was courted by many boys.

== Entertainment career ==
In April 1984, she enrolled at Kichijō Girls' High School (吉祥女子高校), and at the urging of her elder brother, an enthusiastic idol fan, she applied for the Horipro Talent Scout Caravan (ホリプロタレントスカウトキャラバン), a nationwide idol audition, but was not accepted. This, however, led her to join an entertainment agency affiliated with Horipro, and she became active as a model. In 1986, it was decided that the popular manga Touch would be made into a movie, and she auditioned for the role of the heroine of the movie. She was told in advance by the audition officials that you would be selected, nevertheless, she was subsequently rejected in the final round because of her affiliation with an entertainment agency. She cried at this treatment and developed an intense distrust of the entertainment industry.

However, in June 1986, she auditioned for a variety show called Yūyake Nyan Nyan("Sunset Meow Meow") (夕やけニャンニャン) featuring the then very popular idol group Onyanko Club, and she was accepted. After joining Onyanko Club, she was called Oinarisan (おいなりさん, Oinarisan), but eventually became known as Akko (あっこ, Akko). In November 1986, Onyanko Club released a song called Koi wa Question, and she was selected as one of the lead vocalists for the first time. This song is considered one of Onyanko Club's most accomplished works. In December 1986, comedian Makoto Tokonamegawa (常滑川まこと) got into trouble when he pressed his crotch against her face during Yūyake Nyan Nyan.

In February 1987, she took the entrance exams for Rikkyo University, Seikei University, and Otsuma Women's University, in addition to Waseda University where her elder brother was enrolled, but was not accepted, partly because her entertainment activities did not allow her enough time to study. In April 1987, she had no choice but to attend English literature department at Keisen Women's Junior College. However, She was selected, along with Shizuka Kudō and Makiko Saitō, to be a member of the sub-group Ushirogami Hikaretai , replacing Ushiroyubi Sasaregumi, which was disbanded after the graduation of Mamiko Takai. At the time of its formation, she was considered the main figure. In addition, she became a DJ on a radio show called Onyanko no Abunai Yorudayo (おニャン子のアブない夜だよ), along with popular member Marina Watanabe. In May 1987, their debut song, Toki no Kawa wo Koete (時の河を超えて), was released. This song was the theme song for the anime High School! Kimengumi and ranked number one on the Oricon charts. In July 1987, they hosted a radio show, Tokyo Best Hit (TOKYOベストヒット), along with TV personality Tsutomu Sekine. She also became a topic of conversation when she appeared in Lawson's Karaage commercial. Although Onyanko Club disbanded in September 1987, Ushirogami Hikaretai continued its activities, and they held concerts, but their activities were suspended in May 1988. Shortly thereafter, she made her solo debut with the song Mugiwara de Dance (麦わらでダンス), the theme song of the anime Tsuide ni Tonchinkan.

Since then, she has been active in TV dramas and variety shows in addition to singing. From 1999 to 2003, she played the role of a mother who used to be a yankee (the term "yankee" here means "delinquent girl") in a well-received drama series called Kids War (キッズ・ウォー). She also appeared in a popular Jidaigeki called The Unfettered Shogun. In 2010, she studied psychology at the Heartful Life Counselor Academy (ハートフルライフカウンセラー学院, Hārtofuru Raifukaunserā Gakuin) and became a certified cognitive behavioral therapist. In 2022, she became an outside director of TAYA Co., Ltd (田谷), a nationwide chain of beauty salons.

== Political career ==
In September 2016, she became an expert member of the Council for the realization of work style reform (働き方改革実現会議), a consultative committee established by the government.

On April 4, 2022, Ikuina announced her bid for parliament under the Liberal Democratic Party. 2 days later she stated "I'd like to not dirty the Onyanko Club name and do my best." Her opposition to same-sex marriage on an NHK questionnaire attracted controversy, with 14 out of 26 questions left unanswered. It was later revealed that Ikuina's response on a question about Coronavirus policy was identical to LDP opponent Kentaro Asahi's, only changed to be grammatically feminine.

In July 2022, she was elected fifth in the six-member House of Councillors' Tokyo constituency.

On 15 August 2022, Kyodo News erroneously reported that Ikuina attended Yasukuni Shrine, which honours Japan's war dead, including convicted Class-A war criminals. This report led to criticism in South Korea, as the shrine is viewed by many as a symbol of Japan's wartime militarism. The controversy was further amplified when it was announced that Ikuina would represent the government at a ceremony honouring Koreans who had died while being forced to labour at the Sado mines, prompting South Korea to protest her attendance.

Ikuina denied the Kyodo report regarding her visit to Yasukuni Shrine. On 25 November 2024, Kyodo News issued an apology for the erroneous report and acknowledged that the misinformation had adversely affected Japan–South Korea relations.

== Personal life ==
In 2003, she married Tomohiro Sayama (佐山智洋, Sayama Tomohiro), a producer for a commercial production company. They then opened a teppanyaki restaurant. In 2006, She gave birth to a baby girl.

In November 2015, Ikuina announced that she had received treatment for breast cancer. She was first diagnosed in April 2011 on her 43rd birthday, and had undergone five different surgical procedures in the time between her diagnosis and her announcement, the most recent of which had resulted in a total mastectomy of her right breast. In 2016, she released a book entitled "To my Right Breast: Thank You and Farewell" (右胸にありがとう そしてさようなら) documenting the four-year, eight-month long battle from her diagnosis to her fifth surgery.

== Discography ==
=== Singles ===
Year	Title	Details	Peak chart position (Oricon)
1988	"Mugiwara de Dance" (麦わらでダンス)	Release date: May 21, 1988; B-side: "Yume ni Aitai" (夢に逢いたい)	#8
1988	"Virgin Shounen ni Kuchizuke wo" (Virgin 少年に接吻(くちづけ)を)	Release date: September 21, 1988; B-side: "Shadow of Palm Tree"	#9
1989	"Fanfare ga Kikoeru" (ファンファーレが聴こえる)	Release date: January 25, 1989; B-side: "Watashi dake no Liberty" (わたしだけのリバティー)	#15
1989	"Japanese Girl"	Release date: May 24, 1989; B-side: "Yūbae no Hashi" (夕映えの橋)	#23
1989	"Wasuretai no ni" (忘れたいのに)	Release date: September 27, 1989; B-side: "Asatsuyu no Hitomi" (朝露の瞳)	#39
1990	"Nichiyōbi wa Iranai" (日曜日はいらない)	Release date: March 7, 1990; B-side: "Umi ni Naritai" (海になりたい)	#48
1991	"Luna GREAT"	Release date: February 21, 1991; Ending theme for the OVA Majū Senshi Luna Varga (魔獣戦士ルナ・ヴァルガー); B-side: "Luna Varga Hashiru!" (ルナ・ヴァルガー走る!)	#93
1995	"Funky Lullaby" (ファンキーララバイ)	Release date: June 10, 1995; Image song of the Shiroki F.C. Serena football team; B-side: "Funky Lullaby (Long Version)" (ファンキーララバイ -Long Version-)	—
2008	"Oh! Sanpo Biyori" (Oh!散歩日和)	Release date: October 8, 2008; Duet with Takeo Chii; B-side: "Mukashi dattara" (昔だったら)	—

==== Special singles ====
- Akko no X'mas Calendar (あっこのX'mas Calendar) (1989)

=== Albums ===
==== Studio albums ====
- "Ikuina" De-Dance (「生稲」De-Dance) (1988)
- Nihon "Ikuina" Kikō (日本「生稲」紀行) (1989)

==== Compilation albums ====
- My Kore! (Myこれ!) series
  - My Kore! Ction: Ikuina Akiko BEST (Myこれ!クション 生稲晃子BEST) (2002)
  - My Kore! Choice 20: Nihon "Ikuina" Kikō + Singles Collection (Myこれ!チョイス 20 日本「生稲」紀行+シングルコレクション) (2008)
  - My Kore! Lite: Ikuina Akiko (Myこれ!Lite 生稲晃子) (2010)
- Ikuina Akiko SINGLES Complete (生稲晃子 SINGLESコンプリート) (2007)

== Films ==
- Gatsby Bokura wa Kono Natsu Necktie o Suru (1990)
- Okuman Chōja ni Natta Otoko (1994), Kazumi Kasai
- Te no Hira no Shiawase (2010), Ikuko Takebayashi
- Live (2014), Yōko Tamura

== TV programs ==
- 1996-2003: Abarenbō Shōgun, as Obun, (6-12 and the special in 2003)
- 1999-2003: Kids War: Zaken na yo
