= Yoshihiro Okumura (politician) =

Japanese politician (born 1994)

- 奥村 祥大
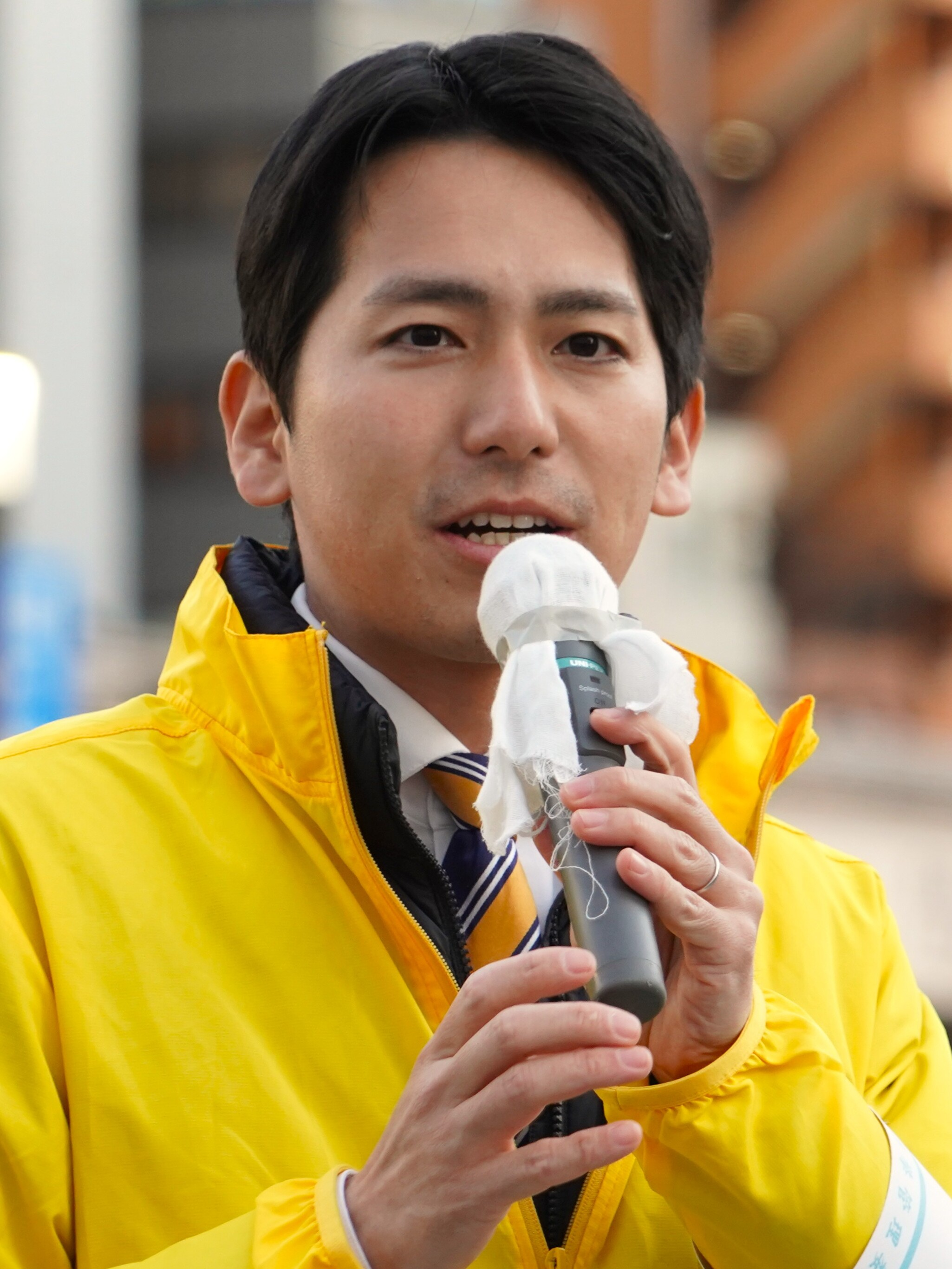
- Okumara in 2026

Member of the House of Councillors
- Incumbent
- Assumed office 29 July 2025
- Constituency: Tokyo at-large

Personal details
- Born: 9 February 1994 (age 32)
- Party: Democratic Party For the People

Yoshihiro Okumura (奥村 祥大, Okumura Yoshihiro; born 9 February 1994) is a Japanese politician who was elected member of the House of Councillors in 2025. In the 2024 general election, he was a candidate for the House of Representatives.
