= Saya (politician) =

Japanese politician (born 1982)

Sayaka Shioiri
- 塩入 清香
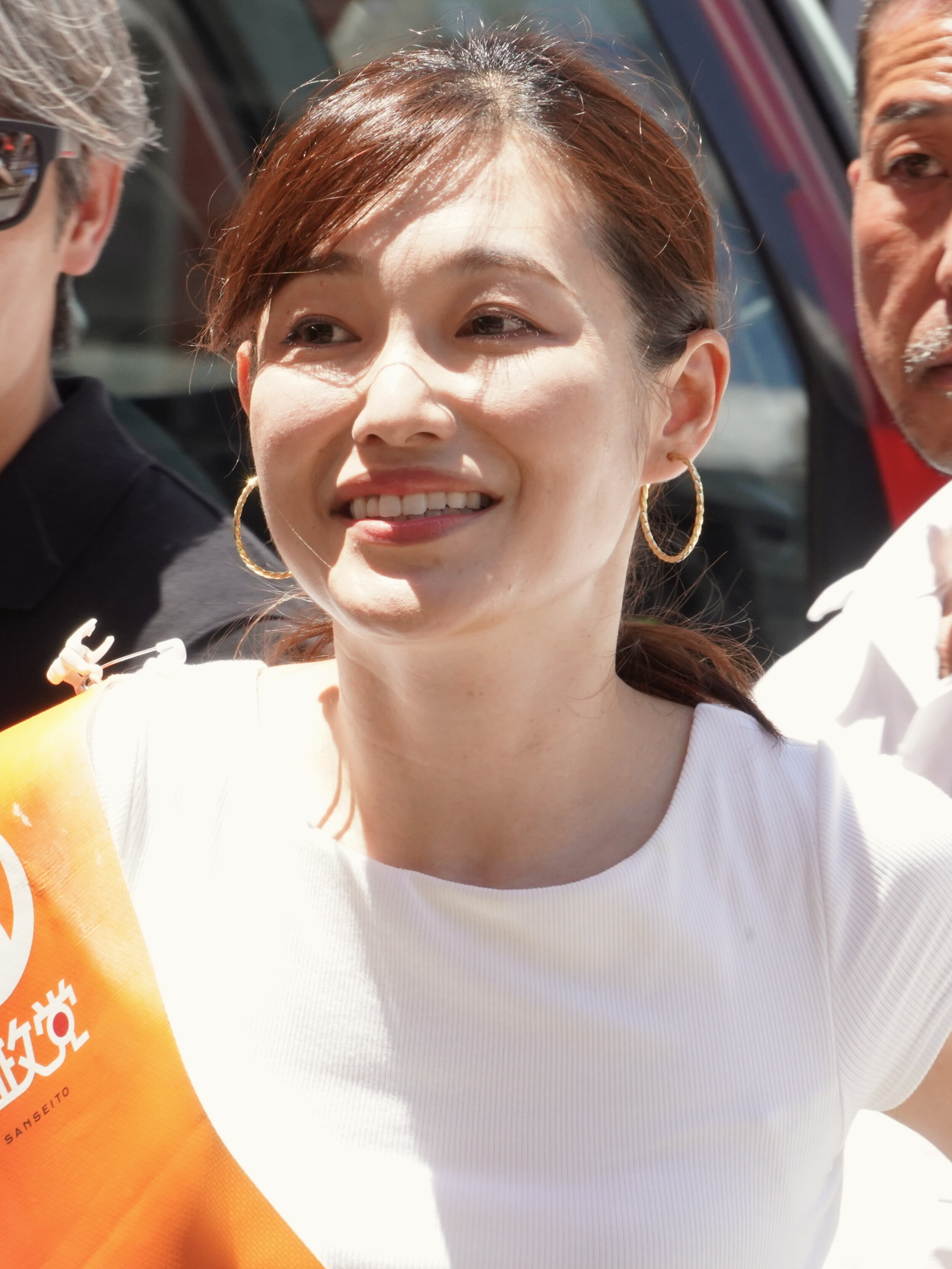
- Saya in 2025

Member of the House of Councillors
- Incumbent
- Assumed office 29 July 2025
- Constituency: Tokyo at-large

Personal details
- Born: 7 July 1982 (age 44) Yokohama, Kanagawa, Japan
- Party: Sanseitō
- Education: Aoyama Gakuin Women's Junior College

Sayaka Shioiri (Japanese: 塩入清香, Hepburn: Shioiri Sayaka; born 7 July 1982), better known as Saya (さや), is a Japanese politician serving as a member of the House of Councillors representing the Tokyo at-large district since 2025. She previously worked as a jazz singer and news presenter.
