= 253rd Air Group =

1942–1944 Imperial Japanese Navy aviation unit

The 253rd Air Group was a unit of the Imperial Japanese Navy (IJN) during the Pacific campaign of World War II. The unit was formed on 1 November 1942 from the Kanoya Air Group and served in Rabaul and the Solomon Islands. The air group was disbanded on 10 July 1944.
