= Yuji Sawa =

Japanese politician (1948–2025)

- 澤 雄二
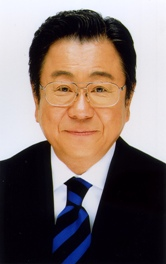
- Official portrait, 2007

Member of the House of Councillors
- In office 26 July 2004 – 25 July 2010
- Preceded by: Toshiko Hamayotsu
- Succeeded by: Toshiko Takeya
- Constituency: Tokyo at-large

Personal details
- Born: 22 April 1948 Tennōji, Osaka, Japan
- Died: 3 January 2025 (aged 76) Kawaguchi, Saitama, Japan
- Party: Komeito
- Children: 3
- Education: Keio University

Yuji Sawa (沢 雄二, Sawa Yūji; April 22, 1948 – January 3, 2025) was a Japanese politician of the New Komeito Party, a member of the House of Councillors in the Diet (national legislature). A native of Osaka and graduate of Keio University, he was elected to the House of Councillors for the first time in 2004 after working at Fuji Television where he produced news and opinion shows. He died of pneumonia on January 3, 2025, at the age of 76.
