= Otokita Shun =

Japanese politician (born 1983)

- 音喜多 駿
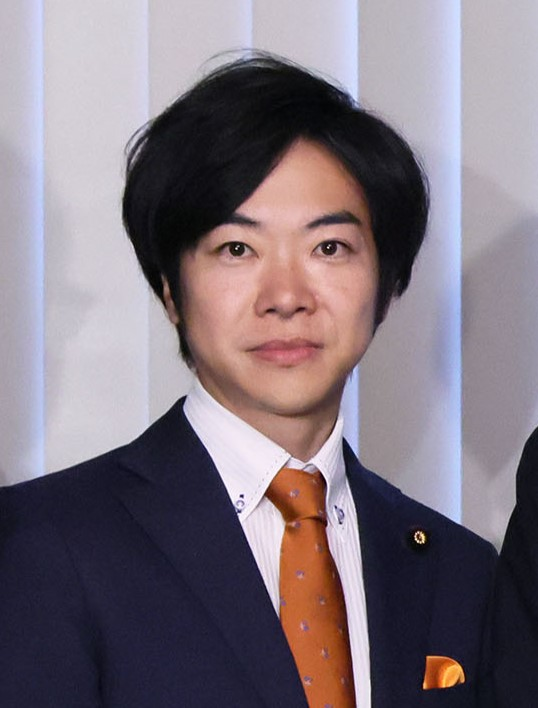
- Otokita in 2023

Member of the House of Councillors
- In office 29 July 2019 – 15 October 2024
- Constituency: Tokyo at-large

Member of the Tokyo Metropolitan Assembly
- In office 23 July 2013 – 31 March 2019
- Constituency: Kita Ward

Personal details
- Born: 21 September 1983 (age 43) Kita, Tokyo, Japan
- Party: Innovation
- Other political affiliations: Your Party (2013–2014); Independent (2014–2015; 2016–2017; 2017–2019); AEJ (2015–2016); Tomin First no Kai (2017)
- Education: Waseda University

Otokita Shun is a Japanese politician who is serving as a member of the National Diet in the House of Councillors for Nippon Ishin no Kai from the Tokyo at-large district. He is now serving as chair of the party's parliamentary policy bureau.

== Early life and education ==
Otokita was born on September 21, 1983, in Tokyo. He attended and graduated from Waseda University's School of Political Science and Economics in Tokyo. He is married to Miyoshi Yurika, a local politician in Kōtō. The couple has an arrangement which allows him to be non-monogamous according to Shūkan Bunshun. He has two daughters and one son, the oldest daughter is Miyoshi's child from a prior relationship but has been adopted by Otokita.

After graduating from Waseda, he worked for LVMH.

In 2010, he was accused of sexual assault by a woman with whom he had a sexual encounter with following a company drinking party and arrested in May before charges were dropped in August.

== Political career ==
Otokita was elected to the Tokyo Metropolitan Assembly in 2013. In the prefectural assembly, he was a member of Tokyo Governor Koike Yuriko's Tomin First no Kai. He was first elected to the National Diet as a member of the House of Councillors in 2019 as a candidate for Nippon Ishin no Kai. He was reelected in 2022 but defeated in 2024.

He is expected to for the House of Representatives in the Tokyo 1st district covering the wards of Chiyoda and Shinjuku during the upcoming lower house election.
