= Yuichiro Uozumi =

Japanese politician

- 魚住 裕一郎
- Official portrait, 2006

Member of the House of Councillors
- In office 23 July 1995 – 28 July 2019
- Preceded by: Akira Kuroyanagi
- Succeeded by: Multi-member district
- Constituency: Tokyo at-large (1995–2001); National PR (2001–2019)

Personal details
- Born: 1 August 1952 (age 74) Kaisō, Wakayama, Japan
- Party: Komeito (since 1998)
- Other political affiliations: CGP (1993–1994); NFP (1994–1998)
- Education: University of Tokyo

Yuichiro Uozumi (魚住 裕一郎, Uozumi Yūichirō; born 1952) is a Japanese politician of the New Komeito Party, a member of the House of Councillors in the Diet (national legislature). A native of Kaisō District, Wakayama and graduate of the University of Tokyo, he was elected to the House of Councillors for the first time in 1995 after running unsuccessfully for the House of Representatives in 1993.
