= Yasuo Ogata =

Japanese politician (born 1947)

- 緒方 靖夫
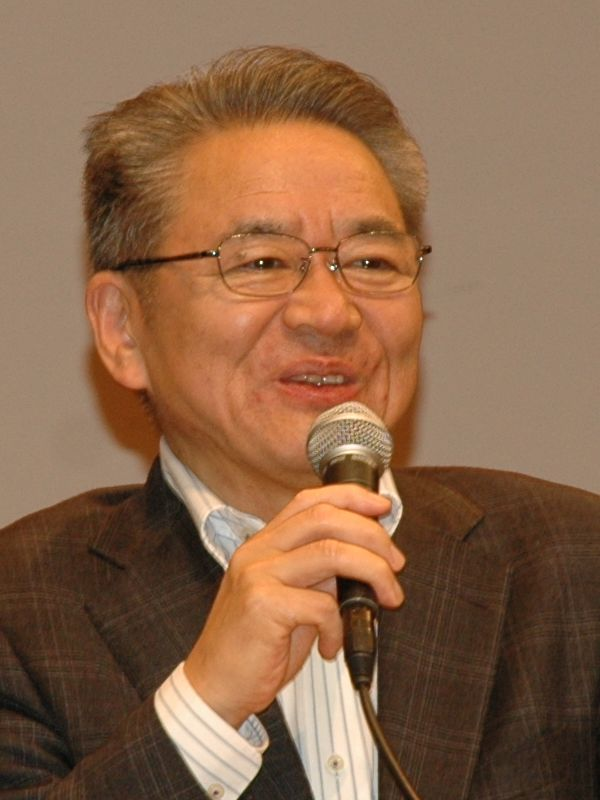
- Ogata in 2014

Member of the House of Councillors
- In office 24 July 1995 – 28 July 2007
- Preceded by: Hideo Den
- Succeeded by: Masako Ōkawara
- Constituency: Tokyo at-large

Personal details
- Born: 29 October 1947 (age 78) Chiyoda, Tokyo, Japan
- Party: Communist
- Education: Tokyo University of Foreign Studies

Yasuo Ogata (緒方 靖夫, Ogata Yasuo) is a former Japanese politician who served as the Vice Chairman of the Japanese Communist Party. He was a member of the House of Councillors from 2000 to 2010. In 1989, Ogata appealed to the Supreme Court of Japan to reopen a case where five officers were investigated for possible violations of the Telecommunications Enterprise Law after an eavesdropping device was found on his telephone line that was diverted to the apartment of the son of a police officer. Ogata is a supporter of the elimination of nuclear weapons.
