= Yoshiko Kira =

Japanese politician

- 吉良 佳子
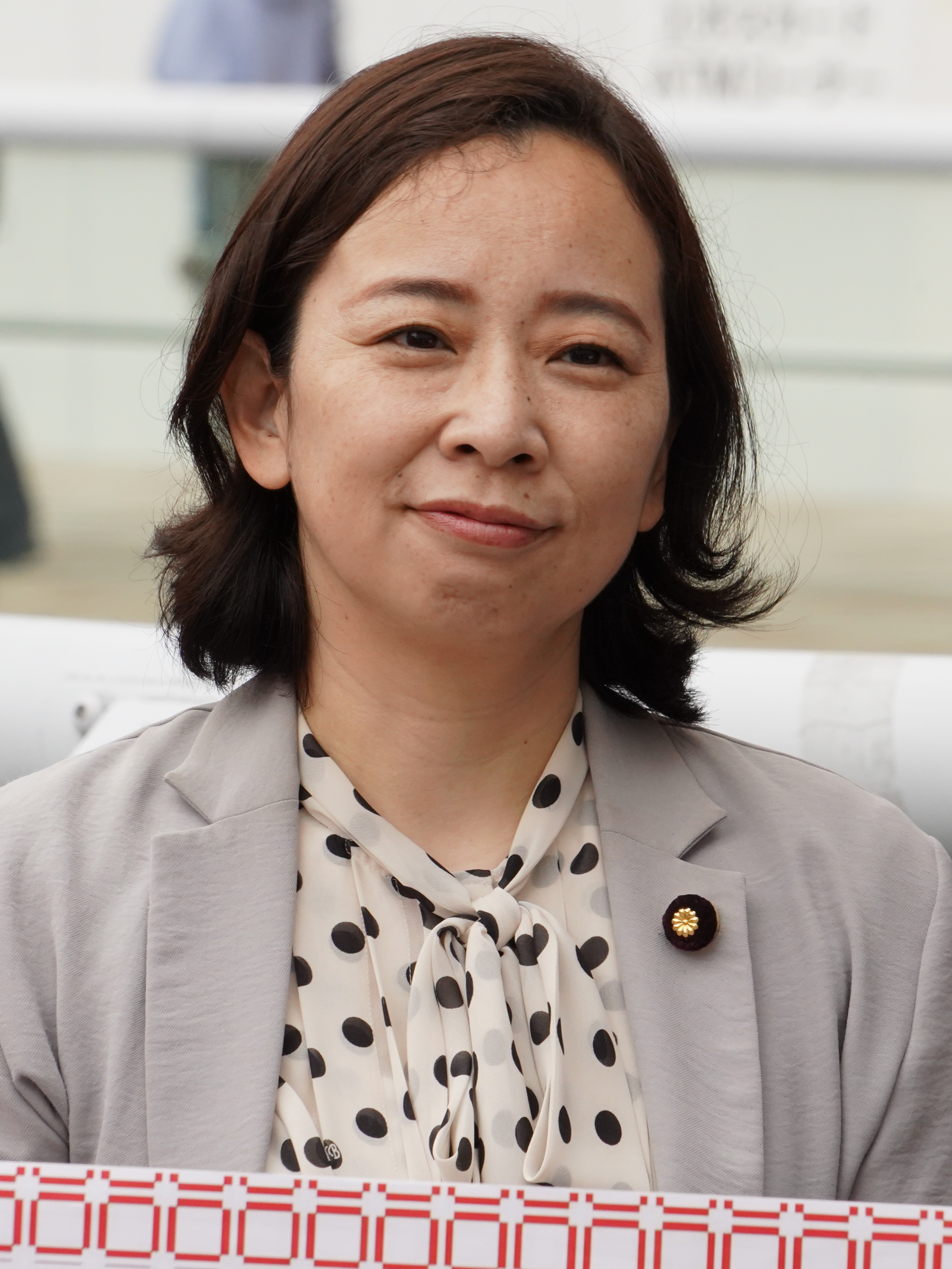
- Kira in 2025

Member of the House of Councillors
- Incumbent
- Assumed office 29 July 2013
- Preceded by: Masako Ōkawara
- Constituency: Tokyo at-large

Personal details
- Born: 14 September 1982 (age 44) Kōchi, Japan
- Party: Communist
- Spouse: Yuichiro Matsushima
- Education: Waseda University
- Website: http://kirayoshiko.com/

Yoshiko Kira (吉良佳子, Kira Yoshiko) is a Japanese politician and member of the House of Councillors since 2013, representing the Tokyo at-large district. She is a member of the Japanese Communist Party.

Kira was born in Kōchi, the daughter of a prefectural assemblyman. She graduated from Waseda University in 2005 and worked for Takara Printing Company for four years before entering politics.

She first ran in the 2009 Tokyo metropolitan assembly elections as a candidate from Toshima City, but failed to win a seat. Her next appearance was in the 2013 House of Councillors election, in which she placed third within the Tokyo at-large district, becoming the first Communist party member to win an at-large district seat in twelve years. One focus of her campaign, along with that of successful JCP candidate Saori Ikeuchi, was the unstable jobs situation faced by young people.

She is a member of the House of Councillors Committee on General Affairs, Special Committee on Political Ethics and Election System, and Commission on the Constitution.

Her husband Yuichiro Matsushima is a member of the Meguro City assembly in Tokyo.
