= Toshiko Hamayotsu =

Japanese politician

- 浜四津 敏子
- Official portrait, 2010

Director-General of the Environmental Agency
- In office 28 April 1994 – 30 June 1994
- Prime Minister: Tsutomu Hata
- Preceded by: Wakako Hironaka
- Succeeded by: Shin Sakurai

Member of the House of Councillors
- In office 27 July 1992 – 26 July 2010
- Preceded by: Tadao Miki
- Succeeded by: Multi-member district
- Constituency: Tokyo at-large (1992–2004); National PR (2004–2010)

Personal details
- Born: 6 January 1945 Taipei, Taihoku, Taiwan
- Died: 29 November 2020 (aged 75)
- Party: Komeito (1998–2020)
- Other political affiliations: CGP (1992–1997); NFP (1997–1998)
- Education: Keio University

Toshiko Hamayotsu (浜四津 敏子, Hamayotsu Toshiko; 6 January 1945 – 29 November 2020) was a Japanese politician of the New Komeito Party who served as a member of the House of Councillors in the Diet (national legislature) from 1992 to 2010.

== Early life ==
She was born in Taipei, Taiwan (then under Japanese administration) and graduated from Keio University in 1967. She passed the bar examination on her third attempt in 1969 and was admitted to the bar in 1972.

== Political career ==
She was elected for the first time in 1992 as a representative of Tokyo in the House of Councillors. In the 2004 election she switched to the national proportional representation slate. From January to November 1998, she served as the president of the New Komeito Party. She announced her retirement from politics at the end of 2009, which became effective following the 2010 election.

In 2002, she proposed a bill to create an enhanced version of life imprisonment for serious offenses, with the ultimate goal of sparking debate about the abolition of the death penalty in Japan.

== Post-political career ==
She was co-managing partner of the law firm of Hamayotsu & Hamayotsu in Kojimachi, Tokyo. In 2011, she became an adjunct professor of law at Soka University.

== Death ==
On February 16, 2023, Komeito announced that Hamayotsu died in November 2020 at age 75.
