= 2019 Japanese House of Councillors election =

- 21 July 2019

124 of the 245 seats in the House of Councillors 123 seats needed for a majority
- Turnout: 48.80% (▼5.90pp; Const. votes); 48.79% (▼5.90pp; National votes)
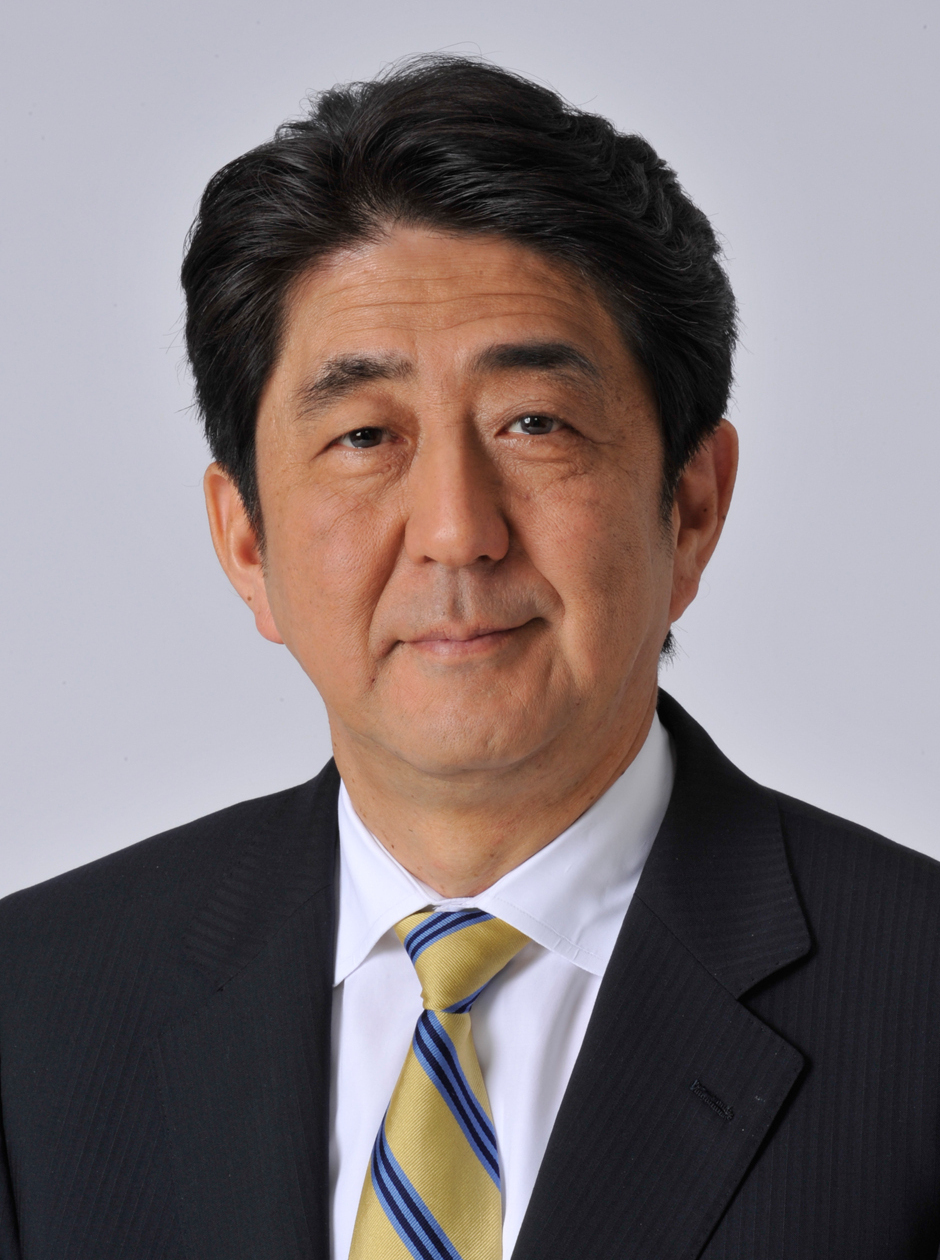

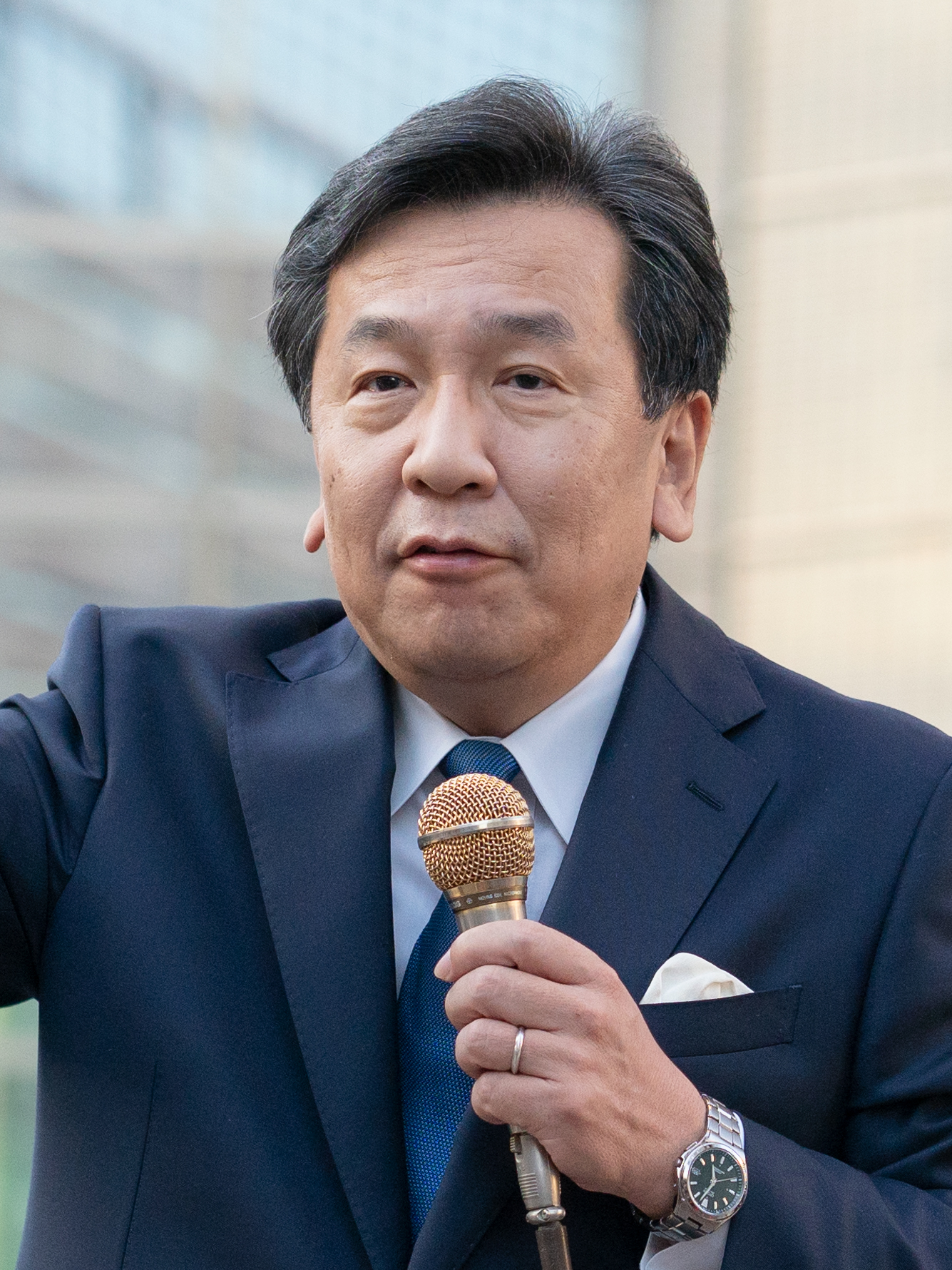

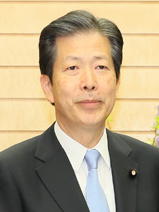

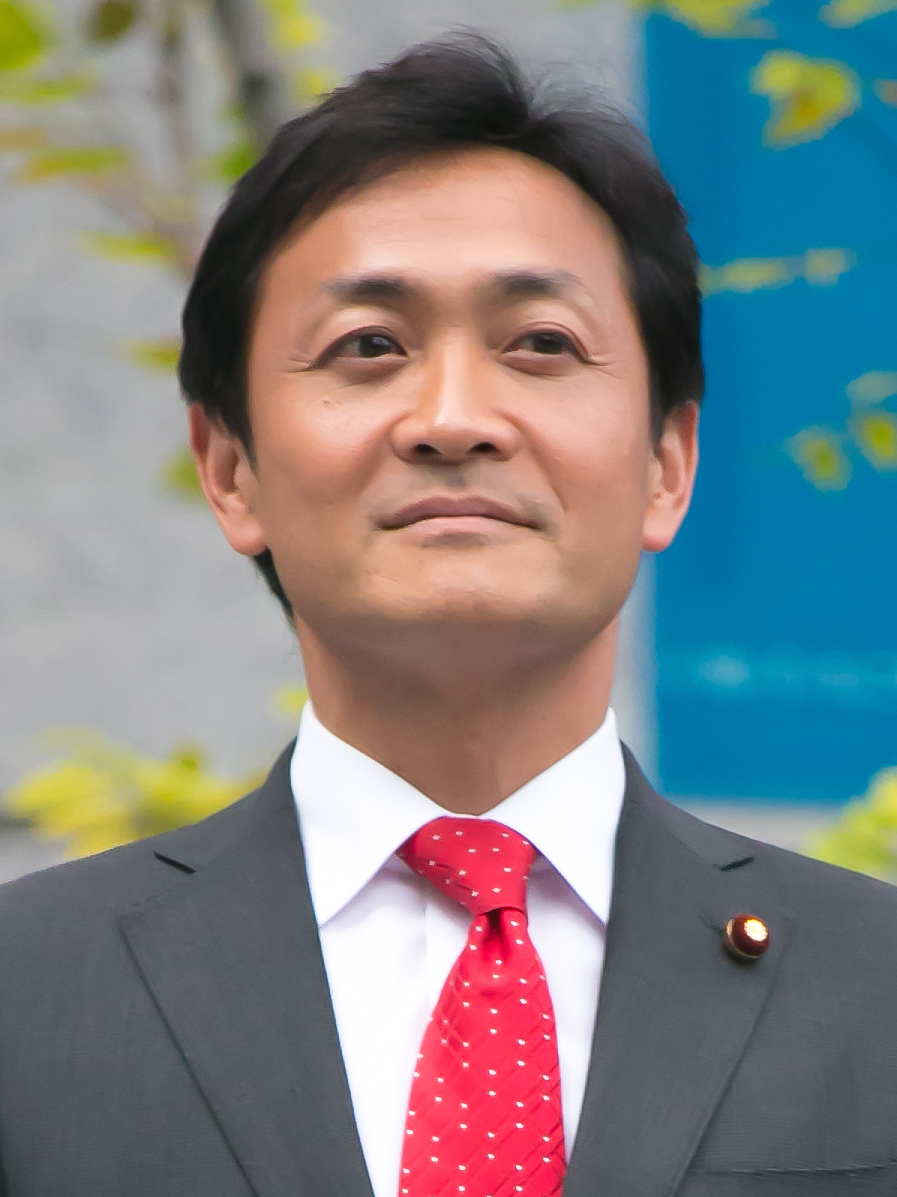

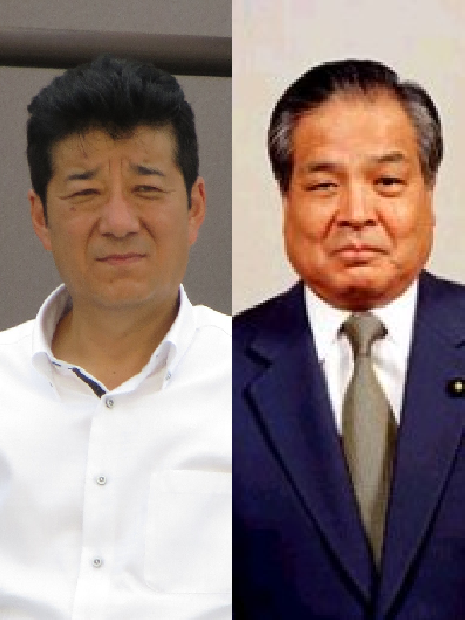

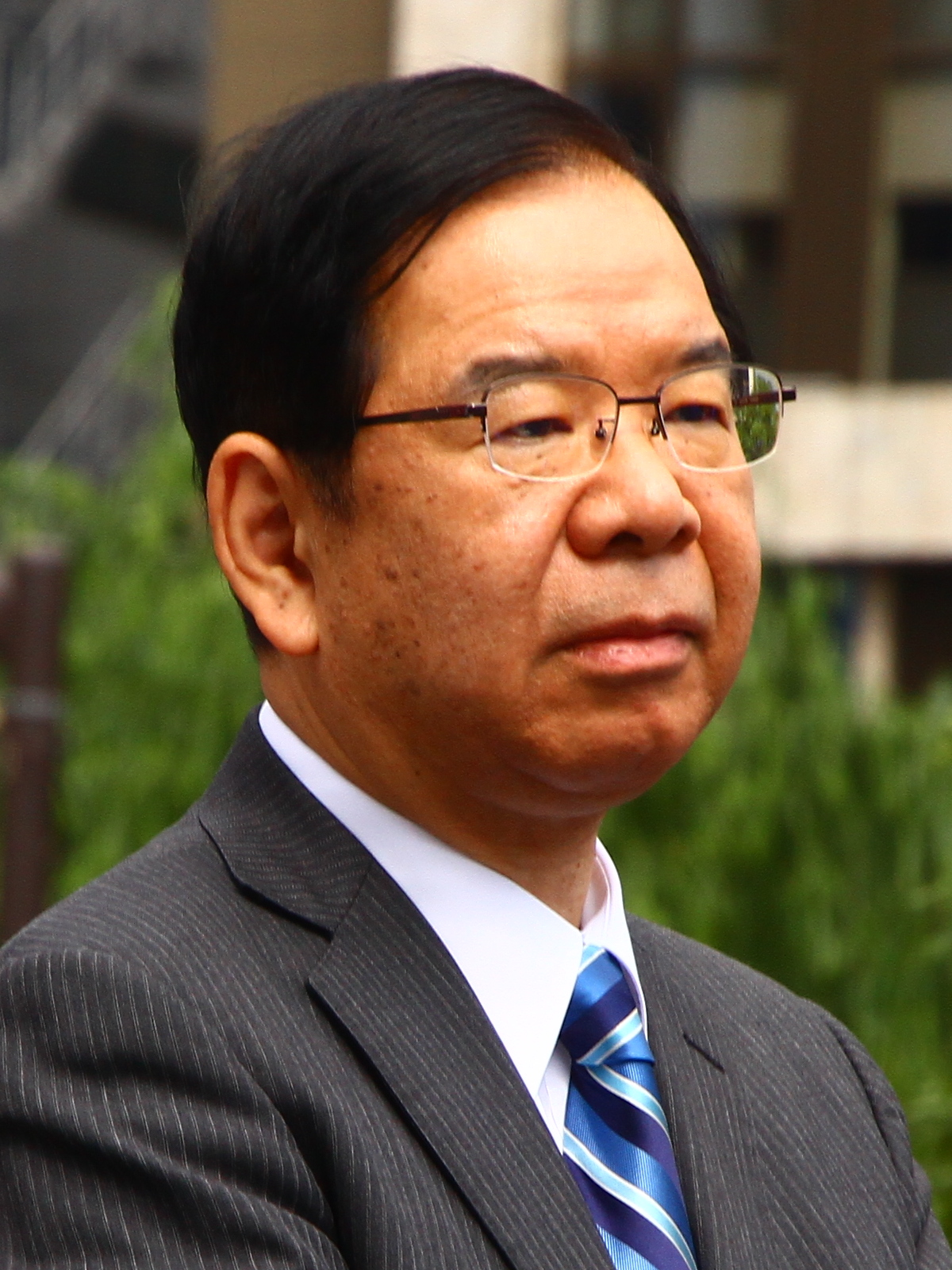
	First party	Second party	Third party
Leader	Shinzō Abe	Yukio Edano	Natsuo Yamaguchi
Party	LDP	CDP	Komeito
Last election	121 seats	Did not exist	25 seats
Seats won	57	17	14
Seats after	113	32	28
Seat change	▼8	New	▲3
Constituency vote	20,030,331	7,951,430	3,913,359
% and swing	39.77% (▼0.17pp)	15.79% (New)	7.77% (▲0.23pp)
National vote	17,712,373	7,917,720	6,536,336
% and swing	35.37% (▼0.54pp)	15.81% (New)	13.05% (▼0.47pp)
	Fourth party	Fifth party	Sixth party
Leader	Yuichiro Tamaki	Ichiro Matsui; Toranosuke Katayama	Kazuo Shii
Party	DPP	Ishin	JCP
Last election	Did not exist	12 seats	14 seats
Seats won	6	10	7
Seats after	21	16	13
Seat change	New	▲4	▼1
Constituency vote	3,256,859	3,664,530	3,710,768
% and swing	6.47% (New)	7.28% (▲1.44pp)	7.37% (▲0.11pp)
National vote	3,481,078	4,907,844	4,483,411
% and swing	6.95% (New)	9.80% (▲0.60pp)	8.95% (▼1.79pp)
- Districts and PR districts, shaded according to winners' vote strength

House of Councillors elections were held in Japan on 21 July 2019 to elect 124 of the 245 members of the upper house of the National Diet for a term of six years.

74 members were elected by single non-transferable vote (SNTV)/First-past-the-post (FPTP) voting in 45 multi- and single-member prefectural electoral districts. The nationwide district elected 50 members by D'Hondt proportional representation with optionally open lists, the previous most open list system was modified in 2018 to give parties the option to prioritize certain candidates over the voters' preferences in the proportional election.

The election saw Prime Minister Shinzo Abe's ruling coalition lose the two-thirds majority needed to enact constitutional reform. The Liberal Democratic Party also lost its majority in the House of Councillors, but the LDP maintained control of the House of Councillors with its junior coalition partner Komeito.

== Background ==
The term of members elected in the 2013 regular election (including those elected in subsequent by-elections or as runners-up) was to end on 28 July 2019. Under the "Public Offices Election Act" (kōshoku-senkyo-hō), the regular election must be held within 30 days before that date, or under certain conditions if the Diet is in session or scheduled to open at that time, between 24 and 30 days after the closure of the session and thus potentially somewhat after the actual end of term.

Going into the election, the Liberal Democratic Party and its coalition partner Komeito controlled a two-thirds super-majority of seats in the House of Representatives but did not control a similar super-majority of seats in the House of Councillors, necessary to initiate amendments of the Constitution of Japan.

=== Pre-election composition ===
(as of 15 March 2018)

↓
44	32	6	8	11	70	14	57
Opposition seats not up	O seats up	RO	RO up	K up	LDP-PJK seats up	K	LDP-PJK seats not up

In the class of members facing re-election, the ruling coalition of the Liberal Democratic Party (LDP), Kōmeitō and Party for Japanese Kokoro (PJK) had a combined 81 of 121 seats (as of March 2018). The governing coalition would have to lose 30 seats or more to forfeit its overall majority in the House of Councillors and face a technically divided Diet. However, as independents and minor opposition groups might be willing to support the government on a regular basis without inclusion in the cabinet, the losses required to face an actual divided Diet may have been much higher. If the Diet is divided after the election, the coalition's two-thirds majority in the House of Representatives can still override the House of Councillors and pass legislation, but certain Diet decisions, notably the approval of certain nominations by the cabinet such as public safety commission members or Bank of Japan governor, would require the cooperation of at least part of the opposition or an expansion of the ruling coalition.

Among the members facing re-election were House of Councillors President Chuichi Date (LDP, Hokkaido), Kōmeitō leader Natsuo Yamaguchi (K, Tokyo) and Minister of Economy, Trade and Industry Hiroshige Seko (LDP, Wakayama at-large district).

== District reapportionment ==
The following districts saw a change in their representation within the House at this election. One set of reforms was introduced in 2012 and first took effect at the 2013 election. The districts below are affected by the 2015 reforms, which started to take effect in the 2016 election.

In May 2018, the government announced that they are planning to introduce a revision into the Public Offices Election Law before the 2019 election. The proposed changes increased the number seats in the House by 6, 2 seats in the Saitama at-large district and 4 in the national PR block. As Saitama currently has the highest voters-to-councillor ratio, the increase would reduce its ratio gap with the least populous district (below the constitutional 3 to 1 limit). Meanwhile, the seat increase in the PR block is aimed to address the absence of representation of prefectures in the merged-prefecture districts (namely Tottori-Shimane and Tokushima-Kōchi) and popular discontent in those prefectures. The plan also introduced a ranking system for the PR lists. This essentially changed it from a most open list system into a less open list system, mirroring the one used in the House of Representatives elections. To reduce the chance of the non-representation of a prefecture, candidates from prefectures not running in the merged districts were to be prioritised on the list.

Under the plan, the new Saitama seat and two new PR seats were contested in 2019, while the other three would be contested in 2022.

District	Magnitude	Notes
Hokkaidō	3	Increased from 2
Miyagi	1	Decreased from 2
Tokyo	6	Increased from 5
Niigata	1	Decreased from 2
Nagano	1	Decreased from 2
Aichi	4	Increased from 3
Hyogo	3	Increased from 2
Tottori-Shimane	1	Created from the merger of the single-member Tottori and Shimane districts
Tokushima-Kōchi	1	Created from the merger of the single-member Tokushima and Kochi districts
Fukuoka	3	Increased from 2

== Opinion polls ==
=== Proportional vote intention ===
Date	Polling firm/source	LDP	CDP	DPP	Kibō	Komeito	JCP	Ishin	SDP	LP	Reiwa	Other	Und.	DK/ no ans.	Lead
13–14 Jul	Asahi Shimbun	35	12	2	N/A	6	6	6	2	N/A	1	1	29		6
6–7 Jul	JNN	33.7	8.6	0.9	N/A	4.7	2.8	3.9	0.6	N/A	0.7		28.4	0.9	5.3
4–5 Jul	Yomiuri Shimbun	36	10	3	N/A	6	4	7	1	N/A	0		25	9	11
28–30 Jun	Nikkei	44	14	1	N/A	6	4	6	2	N/A	—N/a	—N/a	18	5	26
28–30 Jun	Yomiuri Shimbun	40	10	2	N/A	5	4	6	2	N/A	0		23	7	17
26–27 Jun	Kyodo News	28.8	9.0	1.6	N/A	5.6	3.4	3.2	1.2	N/A	0.2		39.2	0.9	10.4
22–23 Jun	Asahi Shimbun	40	13	2	N/A	6	5	6	1	N/A	1	2	23		17
5 Jun	Kibō no Tō loses its legal status as a political party and becomes a political organization.														
1–2 Jun	JNN	41.0	7.0	1.1	0.2	3.2	3.6	2.2	0.3	N/A	0.6		26.3	14.5	14.7
18–19 May	ANN	35.9	9.9	1.3	0.0	5.5	3.2	3.3	0.9	N/A	1.3		N/A	34.6	26
18–19 May	Asahi Shimbun	37	12	3	1	6	5	7	1	N/A	2		N/A	26	25
18–19 May	Kyodo News	38.2	11.2	1.1	0.4	4.1	3.8	4.6	0.7	N/A	0.1		N/A	35.8	27
11–12 May	JNN	38.4	7.3	0.8	0.3	3.9	3.3	3.2	0.6	N/A	0.6		29.2	12.5	31.1
10–12 May	Nikkei & TV Tokyo	43	11	2	0	5	4	7	1	N/A	0		19	7	32
26 Apr	The Liberal Party is merged into the Democratic Party for the People.														
20–21 Apr	ANN	35.4	9.1	1.1	0.1	4.3	4.9	4.5	0.6	0.1	0.5		N/A	34.3	26.3
6 Mar – 15 Apr	Asahi Shimbun	43	17	3	1	5	5	6	2	1	2		N/A	15	26
13–14 Apr	Asahi Shimbun	39	13	2	0	5	6	7	1	1	2		N/A	24	26
6–7 Apr	JNN	38.5	6.5	0.9	0.1	3.8	3.4	2.5	0.7	0.3	0.2		28.7	14.3	32

== Results ==
Party	National			Constituency			Seats			
Party	Votes	%	Seats	Votes	%	Seats	Not up	Won	Total after	+/–
Liberal Democratic Party	17,712,373	35.37	19	20,030,331	39.77	38	56	57	113	–7
Constitutional Democratic Party of Japan	7,917,721	15.81	8	7,951,430	15.79	9	15	17	32	New
Komeito	6,536,336	13.05	7	3,913,359	7.77	7	14	14	28	+3
Japan Innovation Party	4,907,844	9.80	5	3,664,530	7.28	5	6	10	16	+4
Japanese Communist Party	4,483,411	8.95	4	3,710,768	7.37	3	6	7	13	–1
Democratic Party For the People	3,481,078	6.95	3	3,256,859	6.47	3	15	6	21	New
Reiwa Shinsengumi	2,280,253	4.55	2	214,438	0.43	0	0	2	2	New
Social Democratic Party	1,046,012	2.09	1	191,820	0.38	0	1	1	2	0
NHK Party	987,885	1.97	1	1,521,344	3.02	0	0	1	1	New
Assembly to Consider Euthanasia	269,052	0.54	0	215,181	0.43	0	0	0	0	New
Happiness Realization Party	202,279	0.40	0	187,491	0.37	0	0	0	0	0
Olive Tree	167,898	0.34	0	91,675	0.18	0	0	0	0	New
Workers Party Aiming for Liberation of Labor	80,056	0.16	0	75,318	0.15	0	0	0	0	New
Independents of Japan				3,586	0.01	0	0	0	0	New
Independents				5,335,641	10.59	9	8	9	17	+5
Total	50,072,198	100.00	50	50,363,771	100.00	74	121	124	245	+3
Valid votes	50,072,352	96.92		50,363,771	97.47					
Invalid/blank votes	1,592,527	3.08		1,307,308	2.53					
Total votes	51,664,879	100.00		51,671,079	100.00					
Registered voters/turnout	105,886,064	48.79		105,886,063	48.80					
Source: Ministry of Internal Affairs and Communications

=== By constituency ===
Northern Japan
Prefecture	Seats Up	Incumbents	Party	Result	Candidates
Hokkaido	3	Chūichi Date	Liberal Democratic	Apportionment increased by 1 incumbents retired	Harumi Takahashi (LDP) 34.4% Kenji Katsube (CDP) 21.7% Tsuyohito Iwamoto (LDP) 18.8% Kazuya Hatayama (JCP) 11.0% Nami Haraya (DPP) 9.4% Takahira Yamamoto (NHK) 2.6% Osamu Nakamura (AtCE) 1.0% Yoshinori Moriyama (HRP) 0.6% Seiji Iwase (Worker) 0.4%
Hokkaido	3	Katsuya Ogawa	Constitutional Democratic	Apportionment increased by 1 incumbents retired	Harumi Takahashi (LDP) 34.4% Kenji Katsube (CDP) 21.7% Tsuyohito Iwamoto (LDP) 18.8% Kazuya Hatayama (JCP) 11.0% Nami Haraya (DPP) 9.4% Takahira Yamamoto (NHK) 2.6% Osamu Nakamura (AtCE) 1.0% Yoshinori Moriyama (HRP) 0.6% Seiji Iwase (Worker) 0.4%
Aomori	1	Motome Takisawa	Liberal Democratic	Liberal Democratic hold	Motome Takisawa (LDP) 51.5% Toru Odagiri (CDP) 44.4% Hinako Koyama (NHK) 4.1%
Iwate	1	Tatsuo Hirano	Independent		Takanori Yokosawa (LDP) 49.0%Tatsuo Hirano (CDP) 46.3% Hidekazu Kajitani (NHK) 4.7%
Miyagi	1	Jiro Aichi	Liberal Democratic	Seats reduced by one due to change in apportionment Constitutional Democratic Party gain	Noriko Ishigaki (CDP) 48.6% Jiro Aichi (LDP) 47.7% Noriaki Miyake (NHK) 3.7%
Miyagi	1	Masamune Wada	Your Party	Seats reduced by one due to change in apportionment Constitutional Democratic Party gain	Noriko Ishigaki (CDP) 48.6% Jiro Aichi (LDP) 47.7% Noriaki Miyake (NHK) 3.7%
Akita	1	Matsuji Nakaizumi	Liberal Democratic		Shizuka Terata (Independent) 50.5% Matsuji Nakaizumi (LDP) 46.1% Ryuji Ishioka (NHK) 3.5%
Yamagata	1	Mizuho Onuma	Liberal Democratic		Michiya Haga (Independent) 50.2% Mizuho Onuma (LDP) 47.3% Kenji Onozawa (NHK) 2.5%
Fukushima	1	Masako Mori	Liberal Democratic		Masako Mori (LDP) 54.1% Sachiko Mizuno (Independent) 41.9% Masahito Tayama (NHK) 4.0%
Eastern and Central Japan
Prefecture	Seats Up	Incumbents	Party	Result	Candidates
Ibaraki	2	Ryosuke Kozuki	Liberal Democratic		Ryosuke Kozuki (LDP) 47.9% Takumi Onuma (CDP) 22.4% Kumiko Ōchi (JCP) 12.2% Tōru Umino (Nippon Ishin) 11.9% Ken Tanaka (NHK) 5.6%
Ibaraki	2	Yukihisa Fujita	Constitutional Democratic		Ryosuke Kozuki (LDP) 47.9% Takumi Onuma (CDP) 22.4% Kumiko Ōchi (JCP) 12.2% Tōru Umino (Nippon Ishin) 11.9% Ken Tanaka (NHK) 5.6%
Tochigi	1	Katsunori Takahashi	Liberal Democratic		Katsunori Takahashi (LDP) 53.5% Chiho Kato (CDP) 41.0% Norimitsu Machida (NHK) 5.5%
Gunma	1	Ichita Yamamoto	Liberal Democratic		Masato Shimizu (LDP) 53.9% Atsuko Saito (CDP) 38.6% Mikako Maeda (NHK) 7.4%
Saitama	4	Toshiharu Furukawa	Liberal Democratic	1 seat gained by reapportionment	Toshiharu Furukawa (LDP) 28.2% Hiroto Kumagai (CDP) 19.3% Katsuo Yakura (Komeito) 19.1% Gaku Ito (JCP) 12.9% Chie Shishido (DPP) 8.8% Ryo Sawada (Nippon Ishin); Eriko Sato (NHK) 2.9% Ryoji Samejima (Euthanasia) 0.8% Ichiro Kojima (HRP) 0.7%
Saitama	4	Katsuo Yakura	Komeito	1 seat gained by reapportionment	Toshiharu Furukawa (LDP) 28.2% Hiroto Kumagai (CDP) 19.3% Katsuo Yakura (Komeito) 19.1% Gaku Ito (JCP) 12.9% Chie Shishido (DPP) 8.8% Ryo Sawada (Nippon Ishin); Eriko Sato (NHK) 2.9% Ryoji Samejima (Euthanasia) 0.8% Ichiro Kojima (HRP) 0.7%
Saitama	4	Kuniko Koda	Your Party	1 seat gained by reapportionment	Toshiharu Furukawa (LDP) 28.2% Hiroto Kumagai (CDP) 19.3% Katsuo Yakura (Komeito) 19.1% Gaku Ito (JCP) 12.9% Chie Shishido (DPP) 8.8% Ryo Sawada (Nippon Ishin); Eriko Sato (NHK) 2.9% Ryoji Samejima (Euthanasia) 0.8% Ichiro Kojima (HRP) 0.7%
Chiba	3	Junichi Ishī	Liberal Democratic		Junichi Ishī (LDP) 30.5% Hiroyuki Nagahama (CDP) 28.9% Toshiro Toyoda (LDP) 19.1% Fumiko Asano (JCP) 15.7% Masayuki Hiratsuka (NHK) 3.9% Masanori Kadota (Euthenasia) 1.9%
Chiba	3	Toshirō Toyoda	Liberal Democratic		Junichi Ishī (LDP) 30.5% Hiroyuki Nagahama (CDP) 28.9% Toshiro Toyoda (LDP) 19.1% Fumiko Asano (JCP) 15.7% Masayuki Hiratsuka (NHK) 3.9% Masanori Kadota (Euthenasia) 1.9%
Chiba	3	Hiroyuki Nagahama	Constitutional Democratic		Junichi Ishī (LDP) 30.5% Hiroyuki Nagahama (CDP) 28.9% Toshiro Toyoda (LDP) 19.1% Fumiko Asano (JCP) 15.7% Masayuki Hiratsuka (NHK) 3.9% Masanori Kadota (Euthenasia) 1.9%
Tokyo	6	Tamayo Marukawa	Liberal Democratic	1 seat added by reapportionment	Tamayo Marukawa (LDP) 19.9% Natsuo Yamaguchi (Komieto) 14.2% Yoshiko Kira (JCP) 12.3% Ayaka Shiomura (CDP) 12.0% Shun Okita (Nippon Ishin) 9.2% Keizo Takemi (LDP) 9.1% Issei Yamagishi (CDP) 8.6% Yoshimasa Nohara (Reiwa) 3.7% Motoko Mizuno (DPP) 3.2% Masanobu Ohashi (NHK) 2.3% Nozue Chinpei (Independent); Reiko Asakura (SDP) 1.5% Hiroko Nanami (HRP) 0.6% Hitoshi Sato (Euthanasia) 0.5% Masahiro Yokoyama (Euthanasia) 0.4% Koichi Mizoguchi (Olive) 0.3% Jun Mori (Independent) 0.3% Yasuhiro Sekiguchi (Independent) 0.2% Sadakichi Nishino (Independent) 0.2% Kikuo Otsuka (JIP) 0.1%
Tokyo	6	Natsuo Yamaguchi	Komeito	1 seat added by reapportionment	
Tokyo	6	Yoshiko Kira	Constitutional Democratic	1 seat added by reapportionment	
Tokyo	6	Tarō Yamamoto	Reiwa Shinsengumi	1 seat added by reapportionment	
Tokyo	6	Keizō Takemi	Liberal Democratic	1 seat added by reapportionment	
Kanagawa	4	Dai Shimamura	Liberal Democratic		Dai Shimamura (LDP) 25.2% Hiroe Makiyama (CDP) 20.4% Sayaka Sasaki (Komeito) 16.9% Shigefumi Matsuzawa (Nippon Ishin) 15.8% Yuka Asaga (JCP) 11.6% Ryosuke Nogi (DPP) 3.5% Daisuke Hayashi (NHK); Rinko Aihara (SDP) 1.7% Masakatsu Morishita (Independent) 0.6% Aiko Iki (HRP) 0.6% Tomoyuki Kato (Euthanasia) 0.6% Taishi Enomoto (Olive) 0.5% Mitsugu Shibuya (Independent); Takayuki Akutsu (Worker) 0.2%
Kanagawa	4	Shigefumi Matsuzawa	Your Party		Dai Shimamura (LDP) 25.2% Hiroe Makiyama (CDP) 20.4% Sayaka Sasaki (Komeito) 16.9% Shigefumi Matsuzawa (Nippon Ishin) 15.8% Yuka Asaga (JCP) 11.6% Ryosuke Nogi (DPP) 3.5% Daisuke Hayashi (NHK); Rinko Aihara (SDP) 1.7% Masakatsu Morishita (Independent) 0.6% Aiko Iki (HRP) 0.6% Tomoyuki Kato (Euthanasia) 0.6% Taishi Enomoto (Olive) 0.5% Mitsugu Shibuya (Independent); Takayuki Akutsu (Worker) 0.2%
Kanagawa	4	Sayaka Sasaki	Komeito		Dai Shimamura (LDP) 25.2% Hiroe Makiyama (CDP) 20.4% Sayaka Sasaki (Komeito) 16.9% Shigefumi Matsuzawa (Nippon Ishin) 15.8% Yuka Asaga (JCP) 11.6% Ryosuke Nogi (DPP) 3.5% Daisuke Hayashi (NHK); Rinko Aihara (SDP) 1.7% Masakatsu Morishita (Independent) 0.6% Aiko Iki (HRP) 0.6% Tomoyuki Kato (Euthanasia) 0.6% Taishi Enomoto (Olive) 0.5% Mitsugu Shibuya (Independent); Takayuki Akutsu (Worker) 0.2%
Kanagawa	4	Hiroe Makiyama	Constitutional Democratic		Dai Shimamura (LDP) 25.2% Hiroe Makiyama (CDP) 20.4% Sayaka Sasaki (Komeito) 16.9% Shigefumi Matsuzawa (Nippon Ishin) 15.8% Yuka Asaga (JCP) 11.6% Ryosuke Nogi (DPP) 3.5% Daisuke Hayashi (NHK); Rinko Aihara (SDP) 1.7% Masakatsu Morishita (Independent) 0.6% Aiko Iki (HRP) 0.6% Tomoyuki Kato (Euthanasia) 0.6% Taishi Enomoto (Olive) 0.5% Mitsugu Shibuya (Independent); Takayuki Akutsu (Worker) 0.2%
Niigata	1	Ichiro Tsukada	Liberal Democratic		Sakura Uchikoshi (I - CDP) 50.5% Ichiro Tsukada (LDP) 46.4% Tadafumi Kojima (NHK) 3.2%
Niigata	1	Naoki Kazama	Constitutional Democratic		Sakura Uchikoshi (I - CDP) 50.5% Ichiro Tsukada (LDP) 46.4% Tadafumi Kojima (NHK) 3.2%
Toyama	1	Shigeru Dōko	Liberal Democratic		Shigeru Doko (LDP) 66.7% Masae Nishio (DPP) 33.3%
Ishikawa	1	Shūji Yamada	Liberal Democratic		Shuji Yamada (LDP) 67.2% Toru Tanabe (DPP) 32.8%
Fukui	1	Hirofumi Takinami	Liberal Democratic		Hirofumi Takinami (LDP) 66.1% Kazuo Yamada (JCP) 26.2% Masami Shimatani (NHK) 7.7%
Yamanashi	1	Hiroshi Moriya	Liberal Democratic		Hiroshi Moriya (LDP) 53.0% Tomoko Ichiki (Independent) 43.2% Keiji Ino (NHK) 3.8%
Nagano	1	Hiromi Yoshida	Liberal Democratic		Yuichiro Hata (DPP) 55.1% Hiroshi Komatsu (LDP) 39.5% Takashi Furuya (NHK) 3.3% Yoshiaki Saito (Worker) 2.1%
Nagano	1	Yuichiro Hata	Constitutional Democratic		Yuichiro Hata (DPP) 55.1% Hiroshi Komatsu (LDP) 39.5% Takashi Furuya (NHK) 3.3% Yoshiaki Saito (Worker) 2.1%
Gifu	1	Yasutada Ōno	Liberal Democratic		Yasutada Ōno (LDP) 56.4% Shinichi Umemura (CDP) 36.1% Masahiko Sakamoto (NHK) 7.5%
Shizuoka	2	Takao Makino	Liberal Democratic		Takao Makino (LDP) 38.5% Kazuya Shimba (DPP) 29.4% Iehiro Tokugawa (CDP) 19.9% Chika Suzuki (JCP) 9.0% Koichi Hatayama (NHK) 3.2%
Shizuoka	2	Kazuya Shimba	Constitutional Democratic		Takao Makino (LDP) 38.5% Kazuya Shimba (DPP) 29.4% Iehiro Tokugawa (CDP) 19.9% Chika Suzuki (JCP) 9.0% Koichi Hatayama (NHK) 3.2%
Aichi	4	Yasuyuki Sakai	Liberal Democratic	1 seat added by reapportionment	Tsuneyuki Sakai (LDP) 25.7% Kohei Otsuka (DPP) 17.7% Maiko Taijima (CDP) 16.1% Nobuo Yasue (Komeito) 15.8% Maki Misaki (Nippon Ishin) 9.4% Hatsumi Suyama (JCP) 7.6% Yukari Suenaga (NHK) 3.0% Ryohei Hirayama (SDP) 1.5% Hitoshi Ishi (Independent) 1.1% Hiroyuki Ushida (Euthanasia) 0.9% Hitoshi Furukawa (Worker) 0.6% Tsutomu Hashimoto (Olive) 0.6%
Aichi	4	Kohei Otsuka	Constitutional Democratic	1 seat added by reapportionment	Tsuneyuki Sakai (LDP) 25.7% Kohei Otsuka (DPP) 17.7% Maiko Taijima (CDP) 16.1% Nobuo Yasue (Komeito) 15.8% Maki Misaki (Nippon Ishin) 9.4% Hatsumi Suyama (JCP) 7.6% Yukari Suenaga (NHK) 3.0% Ryohei Hirayama (SDP) 1.5% Hitoshi Ishi (Independent) 1.1% Hiroyuki Ushida (Euthanasia) 0.9% Hitoshi Furukawa (Worker) 0.6% Tsutomu Hashimoto (Olive) 0.6%
Aichi	4	Michiyo Yakushiji	Your Party	1 seat added by reapportionment	Tsuneyuki Sakai (LDP) 25.7% Kohei Otsuka (DPP) 17.7% Maiko Taijima (CDP) 16.1% Nobuo Yasue (Komeito) 15.8% Maki Misaki (Nippon Ishin) 9.4% Hatsumi Suyama (JCP) 7.6% Yukari Suenaga (NHK) 3.0% Ryohei Hirayama (SDP) 1.5% Hitoshi Ishi (Independent) 1.1% Hiroyuki Ushida (Euthanasia) 0.9% Hitoshi Furukawa (Worker) 0.6% Tsutomu Hashimoto (Olive) 0.6%
Mie	1	Yūmi Yoshikawa	Liberal Democratic		Yumi Yoshikawa (LDP) 50.3% Masahide Yoshino (Independent) 44.3% Kadota Setsuyo (NHK) 5.4%
Western Japan
Prefecture	Seats Up	Incumbents	Party	Result	Candidates (Party) Vote share
Shiga	1	Takeshi Ninoyu	Liberal Democratic		Yukiko Kada (I-CDP) 49.4% Ninoyu Takeshi (LDP) 47.0% Osamu Hattori (NHK) 3.6%
Kyoto	2	Shoji Nishida	Liberal Democratic		Shoji Nishida (LDP) 44.2% Akiko Kurabayashi (JCP) 25.8% Hiroko Masuhara (CDP) 24.4% Akihisa Yamada (NHK) 3.9% Takashi Mikami (Olive) 1.7%
Kyoto	2	Akiko Kurabayashi	Constitutional Democratic		Shoji Nishida (LDP) 44.2% Akiko Kurabayashi (JCP) 25.8% Hiroko Masuhara (CDP) 24.4% Akihisa Yamada (NHK) 3.9% Takashi Mikami (Olive) 1.7%
Osaka	4	Tōru Azuma	Nippon Ishin		Mizuho Umemura (Nippon Ishin) 20.9% Toru Azuma (Nippon Ishin) 18.9% Hisatake Sugi (Komeito) 16.9% Fusae Ota (LDP) 16.0% Kotaro Tatsumi (JCP) 10.9% Michiko Kameishi (CDP) 10.2% Nishanta (DPP) 3.7% Takinori Ozaki (NHK) 1.2% Takeshi Hamada (Euthanasia) 0.4% Keigo Kazumori (HRP) 0.3% Mio Adachi (Olice) 0.3% Ichiro Sasaki (Worker 0.2%)
Osaka	4	Takuji Yanagimoto	Liberal Democratic		Mizuho Umemura (Nippon Ishin) 20.9% Toru Azuma (Nippon Ishin) 18.9% Hisatake Sugi (Komeito) 16.9% Fusae Ota (LDP) 16.0% Kotaro Tatsumi (JCP) 10.9% Michiko Kameishi (CDP) 10.2% Nishanta (DPP) 3.7% Takinori Ozaki (NHK) 1.2% Takeshi Hamada (Euthanasia) 0.4% Keigo Kazumori (HRP) 0.3% Mio Adachi (Olice) 0.3% Ichiro Sasaki (Worker 0.2%)
Osaka	4	Hisatake Sugi	Komeito		Mizuho Umemura (Nippon Ishin) 20.9% Toru Azuma (Nippon Ishin) 18.9% Hisatake Sugi (Komeito) 16.9% Fusae Ota (LDP) 16.0% Kotaro Tatsumi (JCP) 10.9% Michiko Kameishi (CDP) 10.2% Nishanta (DPP) 3.7% Takinori Ozaki (NHK) 1.2% Takeshi Hamada (Euthanasia) 0.4% Keigo Kazumori (HRP) 0.3% Mio Adachi (Olice) 0.3% Ichiro Sasaki (Worker 0.2%)
Osaka	4	Kotaro Tatsumi	Communist Party		Mizuho Umemura (Nippon Ishin) 20.9% Toru Azuma (Nippon Ishin) 18.9% Hisatake Sugi (Komeito) 16.9% Fusae Ota (LDP) 16.0% Kotaro Tatsumi (JCP) 10.9% Michiko Kameishi (CDP) 10.2% Nishanta (DPP) 3.7% Takinori Ozaki (NHK) 1.2% Takeshi Hamada (Euthanasia) 0.4% Keigo Kazumori (HRP) 0.3% Mio Adachi (Olice) 0.3% Ichiro Sasaki (Worker 0.2%)
Hyōgo	3	Yoshitada Konoike	Liberal Democratic		
Hyōgo	3	Takayuki Shimizu	Nippon Ishin		
Nara	1	Iwao Horii	Liberal Democratic		
Wakayama	1	Hiroshige Sekō	Liberal Democratic		
Tottori-Shimane	1	Shōji Maitachi	Liberal Democratic		
Okayama	1	Masahiro Ishii	Liberal Democratic		
Hiroshima	2	Kensei Mizote	Liberal Democratic		
Hiroshima	2	Shinji Morimoto	Constitutional Democratic		
Yamaguchi	1	Yoshimasa Hayashi	Liberal Democratic		
Tokushima	1	Tōru Miki	Liberal Democratic		
Kagawa	1	Shingo Miyake	Liberal Democratic		
Ehime	1	Takumi Ihara	Liberal Democratic		
Kōchi	1	Kojiro Nakano	Liberal Democratic		
Southern Japan
Prefecture	Seats Up	Incumbents	Party	Result	Candidates (Party) Vote share
Fukuoka	3	Masaji Matsuyama	Liberal Democratic		
Fukuoka	3	Kuniyoshi Noda	Constitutional Democratic		
Saga	1	Yūhei Yamashita	Liberal Democratic		
Nagasaki	1	Yūichirō Koga	Liberal Democratic		
Kumamoto	1	Seishi Baba	Liberal Democratic		
Ōita	1	Yōsuke Isozaki	Liberal Democratic		
Miyazaki	1	Makoto Nagamine	Liberal Democratic		
Kagoshima	1	Hidehisa Otsuji	Liberal Democratic		
Okinawa	1	Keiko Itokazu	Okinawa SM Party		
