= 2013 Japanese House of Councillors election =

- 21 July 2013

121 of the 242 seats in the House of Councillors 122 seats needed for a majority
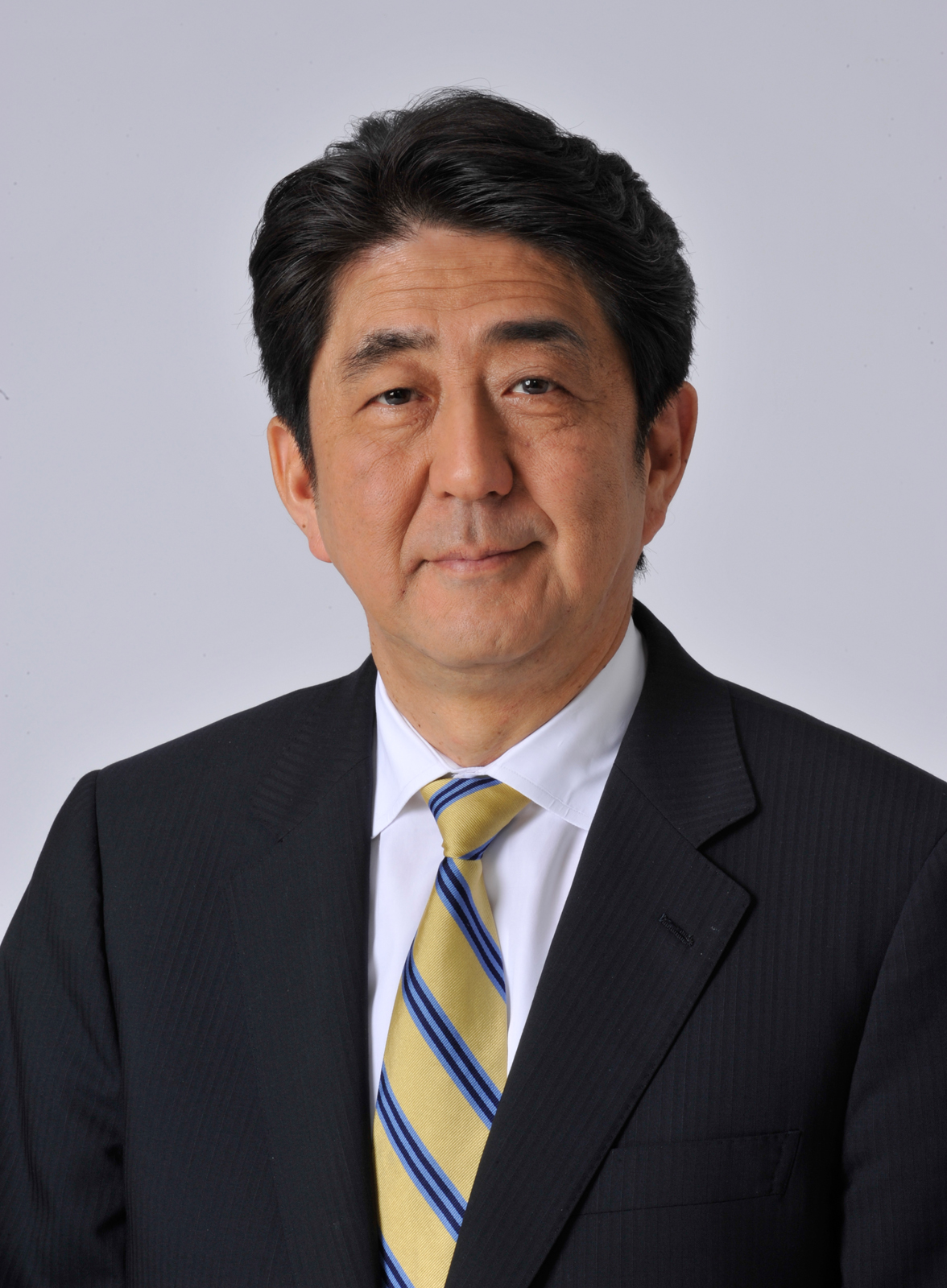

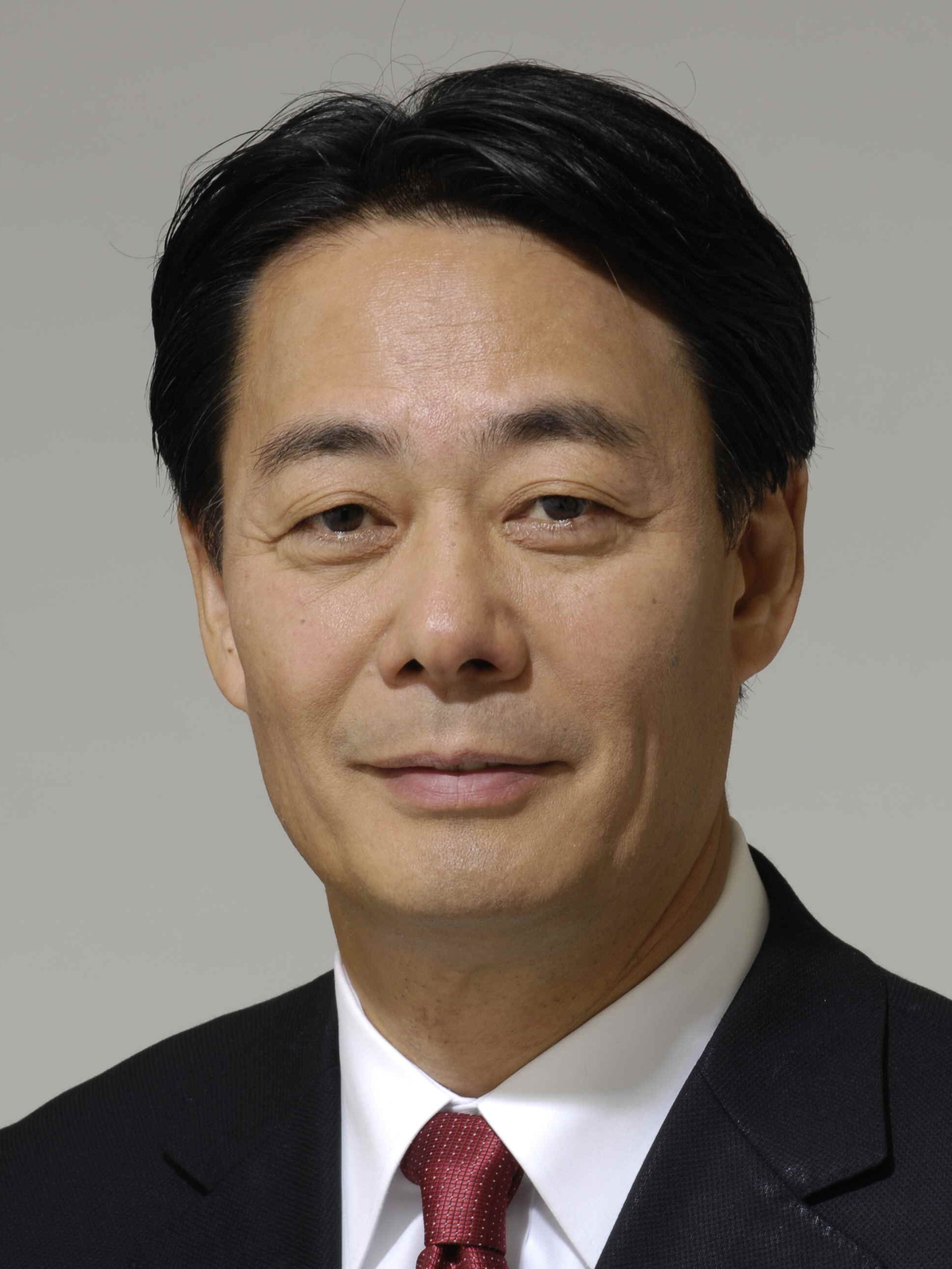

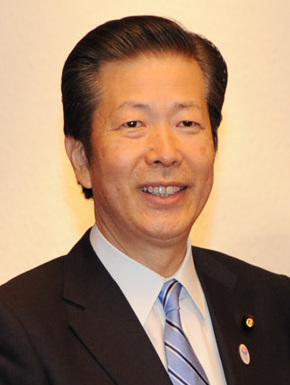

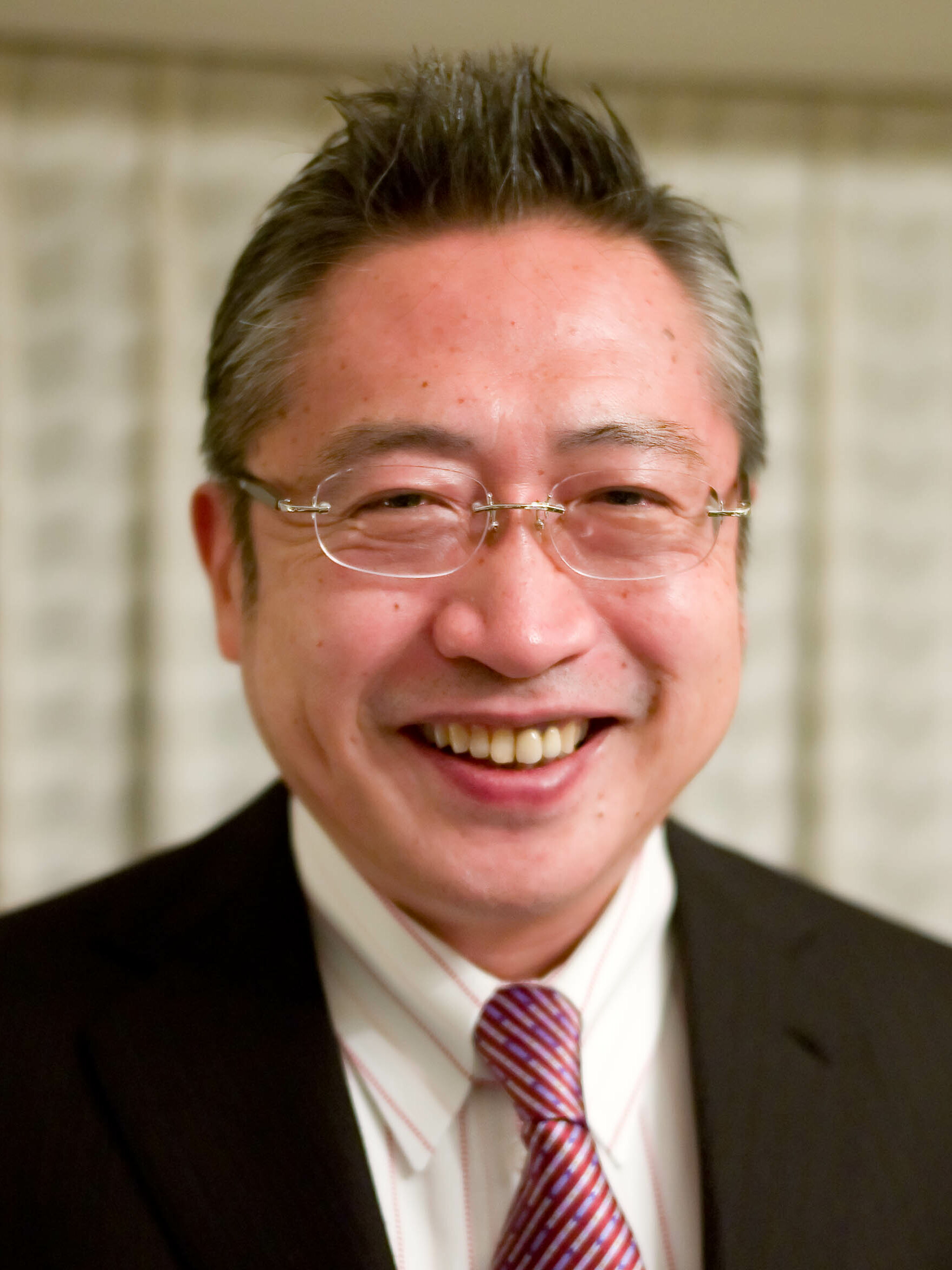

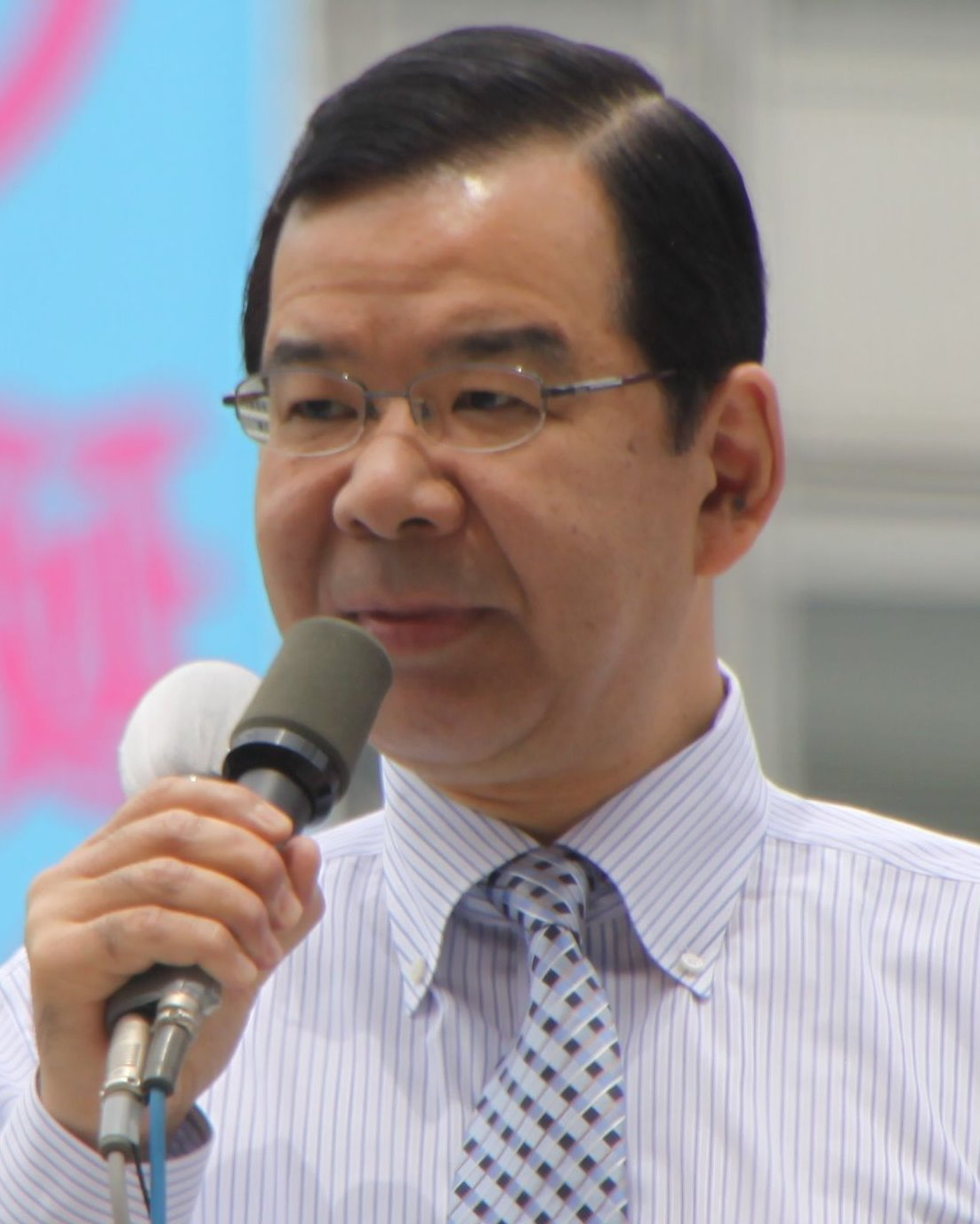

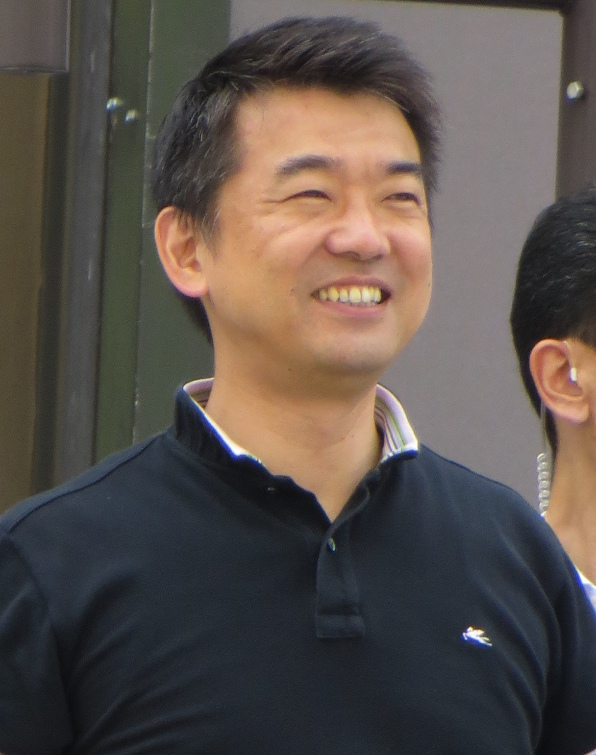
	First party	Second party	Third party
Leader	Shinzō Abe	Banri Kaieda	Natsuo Yamaguchi
Party	LDP	Democratic	Komeito
Last election	84 seats	106 seats	19 seats
Seats won	65	17	11
Seats after	115	59	20
Seat change	▲31	▼47	▲1
Constituency vote	22,681,192	8,646,372	2,724,447
% and swing	42.74% (▲9.36pp)	16.29% (▼22.68pp)	5.13% (▲1.25pp)
National vote	18,460,335	7,134,215	7,568,082
% and swing	34.68% (▲10.61pp)	13.40% (▼18.16pp)	14.22% (▲1.15pp)
	Fourth party	Fifth party	Sixth party
Leader	Yoshimi Watanabe	Kazuo Shii	Toru Hashimoto
Party	Your	JCP	Restoration
Last election	11 seats	6 seats	Did not exist
Seats won	8	8	8
Seats after	18	11	9
Seat change	▲7	▲5	New
Constituency vote	4,159,961	5,645,937	3,846,649
% and swing	7.84% (▼2.40pp)	10.64% (▲3.35pp)	7.25% (New)
National vote	4,755,161	5,154,055	6,355,300
% and swing	8.93% (▼4.66pp)	9.68% (▲3.58pp)	11.94% (New)
- Constituency and proportional representation (bottom right) election result
President of the House of Councillors before election
Kenji Hirata
Democratic
Elected President of the House of Councillors
Masaaki Yamazaki
LDP

House of Councillors elections were held in Japan on July 21, 2013 to elect the members of the upper house of the National Diet. In the previous elections in 2010, the Democratic Party of Japan (DPJ) remained the largest party, but the DPJ-led ruling coalition lost its majority. The House of Councillors is elected by halves to six year terms. In 2013, the class of Councillors elected in 2007 was up.

== Background ==
Japan had been in a "twisted parliament" (ねじれ国会, nejire kokkai) situation since 2007, in which opposite parties/coalitions control the houses of the Diet of Japan (government lower house majority, opposition upper house majority), leading to political paralysis on a number of issues. Shinzo Abe led the Liberal Democratic Party to victory in the December 2012 general election after several years in the opposition. In campaigning to win control of the House of Councillors, Abe sought to resolve the "twisted parliament" problem for the next three years.

Just prior to the election, the U.S. dollar fell against the yen on expectations of more momentum for Prime Minister Shinzo Abe's aggressive monetary easing to fight deflation and boost growth for the export-dominant economy of Japan. Abe's LDP and its coalition partner, the New Komeito party, were tipped to win a majority and end years of parliamentary stalemate so as to enable economic reforms. However, his critics suggested that a strong mandate could even make Abe complacent.

== Opinion polling ==
In the run-up to the election, various organizations conducted opinion polls to gauge voting intentions for the 48 proportional seats. Polls are listed in chronological order, showing the oldest first.

Date	Institute								
Date	Institute	LDP	DPJ	JRP	NKP	YP	PLP	JCP	U/O
9–10 March	JNN	37.5%	8.1%	3.6%	2.2%	2.7%	-	2.2%	43.7%
23–24 March	FNN	41.8%	5.3%	9.6%	-	4.7%	-	-	-
April	Kyodo News	48.2%	6.7%	10.4%	3.9%	4.5%	0.5%	3.2%	22.6%
18–19 May	Kyodo News	44.4%	6.8%	5.7%	4.4%	5.2%	0.3%	3.1%	30.1%
1–2 June	Kyodo News	44.6%	7.9%	4.5%	6.4%	4.0%	0.3%	2.6%	29.7%
8–9 June	Asahi Shimbun	45%	7%	5%	5%	6%	-	4%	28%
8–10 June	Yomiuri Shimbun	44%	7%	5%	5%	4%	-	3%	32%
29–30 June	Mainichi Shimbun	45%	8%	5%	6%	7%	-	4%	25%
29–30 June	Asahi Shimbun	44%	7%	7%	4%	7%	-	5%	26%
2 July	Yomiuri Shimbun	42%	9%	5%	6%	5%	-	4%	29%
13–14 July	Asahi Shimbun	43%	6%	6%	8%	6%	-	6%	25%
13–14 July	Kyodo News	30.6%	7.4%	4.9%	7.0%	3.3%	-	3.8%	43%
13–14 July	Mainichi Shimbun	37%	7%	8%	8%	8%	-	4%	28%
17 July	The Nikkei	39%	10%	8%	8%	7%	-	6%	22%

Note: U/O - Undecided or other

Cabinet approval and disapproval ratings

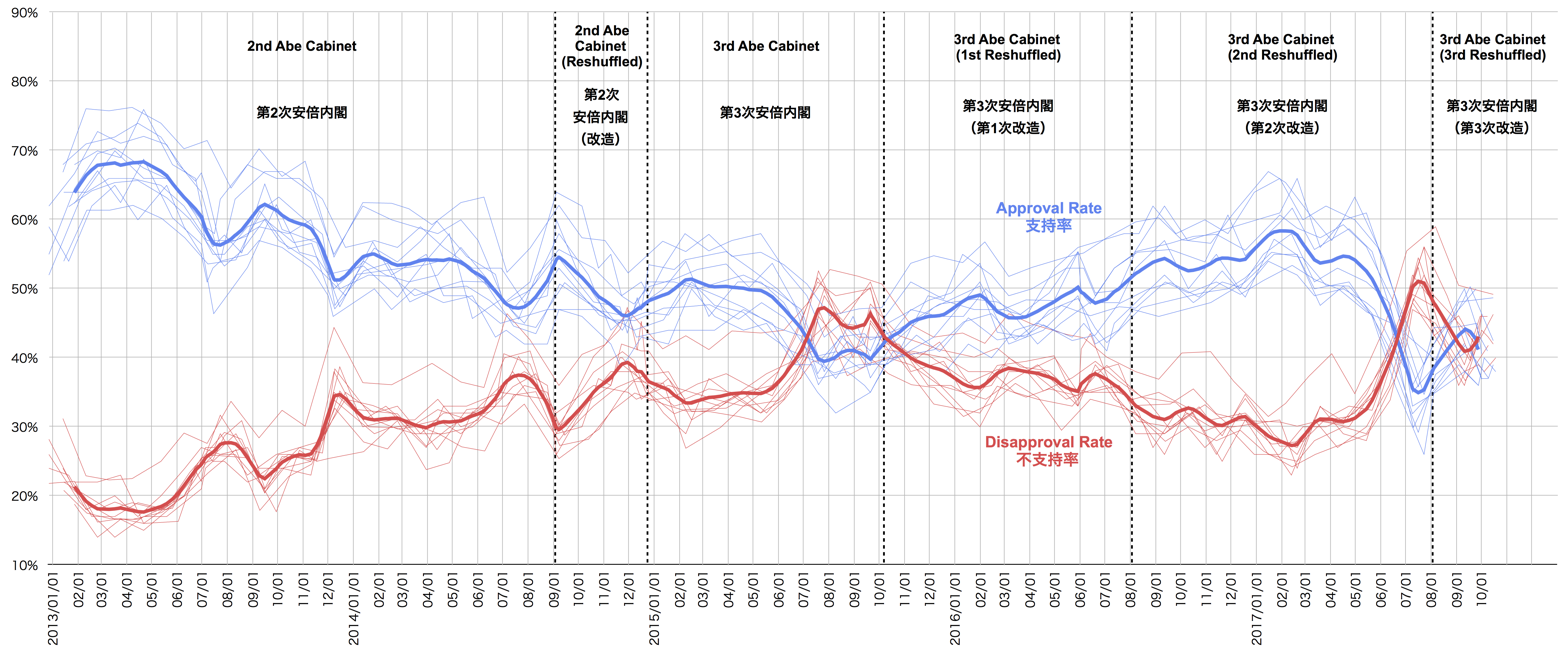
Approval (blue) and Disapproval (red) Ratings for Second and Third Abe Cabinet

== Pre-election composition ==
Note: Composition as of July 13, 2013.

↓
62	44	28	5	10	34	59
Opposition seats not up	DPJ seats up	O	V	NK	LDP seats up	Coalition seats not up

== Results ==
The ruling coalition won 76 seats and now holds a total of 135 seats in the House of Councillors ending the divided Diet.

Of the 31 single-member districts the LDP won 29; only in Iwate and Okinawa, opposition incumbents could hold their seats. The ten two-member districts elected ten LDP and ten opposition members; in several prefectures the second seat went to parties other than the DPJ: In Hyōgo to the JRP, in Miyagi to YP and in Kyōto to the JCP. Twelve of the 22 seats in three-, four and five-member districts went to LDP and Kōmeitō candidates. In the nationwide proportional race, the coalition parties won 25 seats, the opposition parties 23.

Party	National			Constituency			Seats			
Party	Votes	%	Seats	Votes	%	Seats	Not up	Won	Total after	+/–
Liberal Democratic Party	18,460,335	34.68	18	22,681,192	42.74	47	50	65	115	+31
New Komeito Party	7,568,082	14.22	7	2,724,447	5.13	4	9	11	20	+1
Democratic Party of Japan	7,134,215	13.40	7	8,646,372	16.29	10	42	17	59	–47
Japan Restoration Party	6,355,300	11.94	6	3,846,649	7.25	2	1	8	9	+6
Japanese Communist Party	5,154,055	9.68	5	5,645,937	10.64	3	3	8	11	+5
Your Party	4,755,161	8.93	4	4,159,961	7.84	4	10	8	18	+7
Social Democratic Party	1,255,235	2.36	1	271,547	0.51	0	2	1	3	–1
People's Life Party	943,837	1.77	0	618,355	1.17	0	2	0	2	New
New Party Daichi	523,146	0.98	0	409,007	0.77	0	0	0	0	New
Greens Japan	457,862	0.86	0	58,032	0.11	0	0	0	0	New
Green Wind	430,743	0.81	0	620,272	1.17	0	0	0	0	New
Happiness Realization Party	191,644	0.36	0	606,692	1.14	0	0	0	0	–1
Okinawa Social Mass Party				294,420	0.55	1	0	1	1	New
Ishin Seito Shimpu				157,971	0.30	0	0	0	0	New
Genzei Nippon				152,038	0.29	0	0	0	0	New
Assembly for the Future of Saitama				21,358	0.04	0	0	0	0	New
21st Century Nippon Ishin no Kai				20,155	0.04	0	0	0	0	New
Smile Party of Japan				12,228	0.02	0	0	0	0	New
Mitamayama Policy Study Group				11,277	0.02	0	0	0	0	New
Fiscal Consolidation Party				7,425	0.01	0	0	0	0	New
World Economic Community Party				5,633	0.01	0	0	0	0	New
Launch Party				2,906	0.01	0	0	0	0	New
New Renaissance Party							1	0	1	–1
Independents				2,098,603	3.95	2	1	2	3	0
Total	53,229,615	100.00	48	53,072,477	100.00	73	121	121	242	0
Valid votes	53,229,823	97.15		53,072,477	96.85					
Invalid/blank votes	1,563,233	2.85		1,725,121	3.15					
Total votes	54,793,056	100.00		54,797,598	100.00					
Registered voters/turnout	104,152,590	52.61		104,152,590	52.61					
Source: MIC

=== Summary ===
Parties		LDP	NK	DPJ	PNP	YP	JCP	JRP	SDP	PLP	NRP	OSMP	GW	NPD	Others	Indep.	Subtotal	Subtotal	Vacant	Total
Last election (2010)		Opposition		Government		Opposition										Split	Opposition	Government		
Last election (2010)		84	19	106	3	11	6	3^{SPJ}	4	—	2	1	—	—	1^{HRP}	2	131	110	—	242
After 2012 House of Representatives election Opening session 182nd Diet		Government		Opposition												Split	Government	Opposition		
After 2012 House of Representatives election Opening session 182nd Diet		83	19	88	3	11	6	3	4	8	2	1	4	2	0	2	103	133	6	242
Before this election Closing session 183rd Diet		Government		Opposition													Government	Opposition		
Before this election Closing session 183rd Diet		84	19	86	—	13	6	3	4	8	2	1	4	1	—	6	103	134	5	242
Not Up		50	9	42	—	10	3	1	2	2	1	—	—	—	—	1	59	62	—	121
Up	Total	34	10	44	—	3	3	2	2	6	1	1	4	1	—	5	44	72	5	121
Up	29 single-member districts	6	—	10	—	1	—	—	—	1	—	1	2	—	—	4	6	19	4	29
Up	2 two-member districts reapportioned to one seat	1	—	2	—	—	—	—	—	—	—	—	—	—	—	—	1	2	1	4
Up	10 two-member districts	10	—	8	—	—	—	—	—	2	—	—	—	—	—	—	10	10	—	20
Up	Three- and five-member districts Two 3-member districts reapportioned to 4 seats	5	3	8	—	2	—	1	—	—	—	—	1	—	—	—	8	12	—	20
Up	Nationwide proportional	12	7	16	—	—	3	1	2	3	1	—	1	1	—	1	19	29	—	48
Candidates	Total	78	21	55	—	34	63	44	9	11	—	1	8	11	71	27	99	334	—	433
Candidates	31 single-member districts	31	—	19	—	5	30	2	1	2	—	1	2	—	32	14	31	108	—	139
Candidates	10 two-member districts	10	—	10	—	8	10	7	1	2	—	—	—	1	12	2	10	53	—	63
Candidates	Three-, four- and five-member districts	8	4	6	—	6	6	5	3	1	—	—	3	1	15	11	12	57	—	69
Candidates	Nationwide proportional	29	17	20	—	15	17	30	4	6	—	—	3	9	12	—	46	116	—	162
Elected	Total	65	11	17	—	8	8	8	1	—	—	1	—	—	—	2	76	45	—	121
Elected	31 single-member districts	29	—	—	—	—	—	—	—	—	—	1	—	—	—	1	29	2	—	31
Elected	10 two-member districts	10	—	7	—	1	1	1	—	—	—	—	—	—	—	—	10	10	—	20
Elected	Three-, four- and five-member districts	8	4	3	—	3	2	1	—	—	—	—	—	—	—	1	12	10	—	22
Elected	Nationwide proportional	18	7	7	—	4	5	6	1	—	—	—	—	—	—	—	25	23	—	48
Result		115	20	59	—	18	11	9	3	2	1	1	—	—	—	3	135	107	—	242
Opening session 184th Diet (by parliamentary group)		114 (113)	20 (20)	59 (58)	—	18 (18)	11 (11)	9 (9)	3 (3)	2 (2)	1 (3)	1 (—)	—	—	—	3 (4)	134	107	1	242

Differences between party and parliamentary group membership in the post-election opening session: Two independents caucus with the NRP, President Masaaki Yamazaki (LDP – Fukui), Vice-President Azuma Koshiishi (DPJ – Yamanashi) and Keiko Itokazu (OSMP – Okinawa) are independents in terms of parliamentary group.

=== Results by electoral district ===
Abbreviations and translations used in this table for (nominating – endorsing) parties:

- L – Liberal Democratic Party
- D – Democratic Party
- K – Kōmeitō
- C - Japanese Communist Party
- S – Social Democratic Party
- I – Independent
- Ishin – Japan Restoration Association (Nippon Ishin no Kai)
- Minna – Your Party (Minna no Tō)
- PLP – People's Life Party
- Daichi – New Party Daichi
- Mikaze – Green Wind (Midori no kaze)
- Midori – Greens Japan (Midori no tō gurīnzu japan)
- OS – Okinawa Socialist Mass Party
- NRP – New Renaissance Party
- HRP – Happiness Realization Party
- LF/TPJ (in reference to vacant seats) – People's Life First (LF) members of the House of Councillors who resigned from or lost their seats in late 2012 to contest the House of Representatives election as candidates for the Tomorrow Party of Japan (TPJ)

District	Magnitude	Incumbents	Winners & runner-up [+incumbents if lower] with vote share (/votes for PR members)	Gains & losses by party
Hokkaidō	2	Katsuya Ogawa (D); Chūichi Date (L)	Chūichi Date (L – K) 37.7% Katsuya Ogawa (D) 24.4% Takahiro Asano (Daichi) 14.7%	
Aomori	1	Kōji Hirayama (PLP)	Motome Takisawa (L – K) 51.3% Kōji Hirayama (PLP – SDP, Mikaze) 15.0%	PLP -1 L +1
Iwate	1	Tatsuo Hirano (I)	Tatsuo Hirano (I) 39.7% Shin'ichi Tanaka (L – K) 26.4%	
Miyagi	2	Tomiko Okazaki (D); Jirō Aichi (L)	Jirō Aichi (L - K) 44.7% Masamune Wada (Minna) 23.3% Tomiko Okazaki (D) 22.8%	D -1 Minna +1
Akita	1	Daigo Matsuura (D)	Matsuji Nakaizumi (L - K) 52.3% Daigo Matsuura (D) 39.0%	D -1 L +1
Yamagata	1	Yasue Funayama (Mikaze)	Mizuho Ōnuma (L - K) 48.2% Yasue Funayama (Mikaze – S) 44.6%	Mikaze -1 L +1
Fukushima	1 (-1)	Emi Kaneko (D); Masako Mori (L)	Masako Mori (L - K) 56.6% Emi Kaneko (D) 28.2%	D -1
Ibaraki	2	Yukihisa Fujita (D); Tamon Hasegawa (L)	Ryōsuke Kōzuki (L - K) 48.4% Yukihisa Fujita (D) 17.6% Junko Ishihara (Minna) 13.3%	
Tochigi	1	Hiroyuki Tani (D)	Katsunori Takahashi (L - K) 48.1% Tomomi Oki (Minna) 25.8% Hiroyuki Tani (D) 20.3%	D -1 L +1
Gunma	1	Ichita Yamamoto (L)	Ichita Yamamoto (L - K) 71.9% Fujiko Kagaya (D) 15.3%	
Saitama	3	Kuniko Kōda (Minna); Toshiharu Furukawa (L); Ryūji Yamane (D)	Toshiharu Furukawa (L) 34.1% Katsuo Yakura (K – L) 20.4% Kuniko Kōda (Minna) 16.5% Ryūji Yamane (D) 13.3%	D -1 K +1
Chiba	3	Hiroyuki Nagahama (D); Jun'ichi Ishii (L); Ken Kagaya (D)	Jun'ichi Ishii (L – K) 28.5% Toshirō Toyoda (L – K) 17.5% Hiroyuki Nagahama (D) 16.3% Masahiro Terada (Minna) 11.9%	D -1 L +1
Tokyo	5	Masako Ōkawara (I); Natsuo Yamaguchi (K); Kan Suzuki (D); Ryūhei Kawada (Minna); Tamayo Marukawa (L)	Tamayo Marukawa (L) 18.9% Natsuo Yamaguchi (K) 14.2% Yoshiko Kira (C) 12.5% Tarō Yamamoto (I) 11.8% Keizō Takemi (L) 10.9% Kan Suzuki (D) 9.8%... Masako Ōkawara (I) 4.2%	D -1, Minna -1, I (ex-D) -1 L +1, C +1, I (PLP-aligned) +1
Kanagawa	4 (+1)	Hiroe Makiyama (D); Masashi Mito (Ishin); Akira Matsu (K)	Dai Shimomura (L) 28.8% Shigefumi Matsuzawa (Minna) 18.8% Sayaka Sasaki (K) 16.0% Hiroe Makiyama (D) 11.7% Kimie Hatano (C) 11.3% Masashi Mito (Ishin) 6.2%	Ishin -1 L +1, Minna +1
Niigata	2	Ichirō Tsukada (L); Yūko Mori (PLP)	Ichirō Tsukada (L – K) 43.3% Naoki Kazama (D) 19.3% Yūko Mori (PLP) 15.6%	PLP -1 D +1
Toyama	1	Takashi Morita (I)	Shigeru Dōkō (L – K) 77.1% Wataru Takahashi (C) 12.1%	I (ex-PNP) -1 L +1
Ishikawa	1	Yasuo Ichikawa (D)	Shūji Yamada (L – K) 64.8% Yasuo Ichikawa (D) 23.0%	D -1 L +1
Fukui	1	Ryūji Matsumura (L)	Hirofumi Takinami (L – K) 70.6% Toshikazu Fujino (D) 16.8%	
Yamanashi	1	Harunobu Yonenaga (Minna)	Hiroshi Moriya (L – K) 37.3% Takahiro Sakaguchi (I – D, S) 19.8%... Harunobu Yonenaga (Minna) 15.4%	Minna -1 L +1
Nagano	2	Yūichirō Hata (D); Hiromi Yoshida (L)	Hiromi Yoshida (L – K) 37.2% Yūichirō Hata (D) 30.0% Chiaki Karasawa (C) 15.8%	
Gifu	1 (-1)	vacant (last held by Takao Fujii, Ishin); Kenji Hirata (D)	Yasutada Ōno (L – K) 58.8% Rie Yoshida (D) 25.6%	D -1 L +1
Shizuoka	2	Kazuya Shinba (D); Takao Makino (L)	Takao Makino (L – K) 41.5% Kazuya Shinba (D) 30.0% Yukiko Suzuki (Minna) 12.2%	
Aichi	3	Kōhei Ōtsuka (D); Seiji Suzuki (L); Kuniko Tanioka (Mikaze)	Yasuyuki Sakai (L – K) 35.4% Kōhei Ōtsukai (D) 24.9% Michiyo Yakushiji (Minna) 11.6% Nobuko Motomura (C) 9.1%... Makoto Hirayama (Mikaze – PLP) 2.1%	Mikaze -1 Minna +1
Mie	1	Chiaki Takahshi (D)	Yūmi Yoshikawa (L – K) 44.2% Chiaki Takahshi (D) 37.6%	D -1 L +1
Shiga	1	Hisashi Tokunaga (D)	Takeshi Ninoyu (L – K) 53.4% Hisashi Tokunaga (D) 29.2%	D -1 L +1
Kyoto	2	Kōji Matsui (D); Shōji Nishida (L)	Shōji Nishida (L – K) 37.0% Akiko Kurabayashi (C) 20.7% Keirō Kitagami (D) 19.0%	D -1 C +1
Osaka	4 (+1)	Satoshi Umemura (D); Kazuyoshi Shirahama (K); Shūzen Tanigawa (L)	Tōru Azuma (Ishin) 28.8% Takuji Yanagimoto (L) 22.3% Hisatake Sugi (K) 19.0% Kōtarō Tatsumi (C) 12.8% Satoshi Umemura (D) 9.2%	D -1 C +1, Ishin +1
Hyōgo	2	Yasuhiro Tsuji (D); Yoshitada Kōnoike (L)	Yoshitada Kōnoike (L – K) 37.8% Takayuki Shimizu (Ishin) 26.1% Yasuhiro Tsuji (D) 15.0%	D -1 Ishin +1
Nara	1	vacant (last held by Tetsuji Nakamura, LF/TPJ)	Iwao Horii (L – K) 58.6% Takanori Ōnishi (D) 23.1%	L +1
Wakayama	1	Hiroshige Sekō (L)	Hiroshige Sekō (L – K) 77.3% Yasuhisa Hara (C) 19.0%	
Tottori	1	Yoshihiro Kawakami (D)	Shōji Maitachi (L – K) 58.2% Yoshihiro Kawakami (D) 30.0%	D -1 L +1
Shimane	1	Akiko Kamei (Mikaze)	Saburō Shimada (L – K) 57.8% Akiko Kamei (Mikaze – S) 32.9%	Mikaze -1 L +1
Okayama	1	vacant (last held by Yumiko Himei, LF/TPJ)	Masahiro Ishii (L – K) 65.5% Takashi Takai (I – D, S, Mikaze) 24.1%	L +1
Hiroshima	2	Kōji Satō (PLP); Kensei Mizote (L)	Kensei Mizote (L – K) 46.3% Shinji Morimoto (D) 17.2% Kana Haioka (Ishin) 15.4% Kōji Satō (PLP – Mikaze) 12.2%	PLP -1 D +1
Yamaguchi	1	Yoshimasa Hayashi (L)	Yoshimasa Hayashi (L – K) 79.4% Naoko Fujii (C) 16.6%	
Tokushima	1	Tomoji Nakatani (D)	Tōru Miki (L – K) 57.5% Tomoji Nakatani (D) 29.1%	D -1 L +1
Kagawa	1	Emiko Uematsu (I)	Shingo Miyake (L – K) 56.0% Emiko Uematsu (I) 34.2%	I (ex-D) -1 L +1
Ehime	1	vacant (last held by Toshirō Tomochika, LF/TPJ)	Takumi Ihara (L – K) 66.6% Kayoko Fujioka (Minna) 18.4%	L +1
Kōchi	1	Norio Takeuchi (D)	Kōjirō Takano (L – K) 52.9% Yuriko Hamakawa (C) 24.1% Norio Takeuchi (D) 21.6%	D -1 L +1
Fukuoka	2	Tsukasa Iwamoto (D); Masaji Matsuyama (L)	Masaji Matsuyama (L – K) 49.2% Kuniyoshi Noda (D – PLP) 17.9% Toshiyuki Yoshida (Ishin) 11.4%	
Saga	1	Minoru Kawasaki (I)	Yūhei Yamashita (L – K) 64.6% Kazunori Aoki (D) 24.1%	I (ex-D) -1 L +1
Nagasaki	1	Yukishige Ōkubo (D)	Yūichirō Koga (L – K) 59.2% Yukishige Ōkubo (D – Mikaze) 30.7%	D -1 L +1
Kumamoto	1	Nobuo Matsuno (D)	Seishi Baba (L – K) 60.6% Nobuo Matsuno (D – Mikaze) 29.8%	D -1 L +1
Ōita	1	Yōsuke Isozaki (L)	Yōsuke Isozaki (L – K) 50.0% Shintarō Gotō (I – S, PLP, Mikaze) 27.3%	
Miyazaki	1	vacant (last held by Itsuki Sotoyama, LF/TPJ)	Makoto Nagamine (L – K) 69.3% Seiichirō Dōkyū (D) 18.6%	L +1
Kagoshima	1	Hidehisa Otsuji (L)	Hidehisa Otsuji (L – K) 59.0% Inao Minayoshi (D) 17.7%	
Okinawa	1	Keiko Itokazu (OS)	Keiko Itokazu (OS – C, S, PLP, Mikaze) 51.1% Masaaki Asato (L – K) 45.4%	
National	48	D 16; L 12; K 7 C 3 PLP 3 S 2 Ishin 1 Mikaze 1 Daichi 1 NRP 1 I 1	L 34.7% of proportional votes→18 seats: Yoshifumi Tsuge 429,002; Toshio Yamada 338,485; Masahisa Satō 326,541; Midori Ishii 294,148; Seiko Hashimoto 279,952; Takashi Hanyūda 249,818; Nobuaki Satō 215,506; Masaaki Akaike 208,319; Akiko Santō 205,779; Seiichi Etō 204,404; Masahiro Ishida 201,109; Haruko Arimura 191,343; Shūji Miyamoto 178,480; Kazuya Maruyama 153,303; Tsuneo Kitamura 142,613; Miki Watanabe 104,176; Yoshio Kimura 98,979; Fusae Ōta 77,173; Masaru Wakasa 76,829	D -9, PLP -3, S -1, Daichi -1, Mikaze -1 NRP -1, I -1 L +6, C +2, Ishin +5, Minna +4
National	48	D 16; L 12; K 7 C 3 PLP 3 S 2 Ishin 1 Mikaze 1 Daichi 1 NRP 1 I 1	K 14.2% of proportional votes→7 seats: Kanae Yamamoto 996,959; Daisaku Hiraki 770,682; Yoshihiro Kawano 703,637; Hiroshi Yamamoto 592,814; Kaneshige Wakamatsu 577,951; Yūichirō Uozumi 540,817; Hideki Niizuma 26,044; Nobuo Kawashima 7,737	D -9, PLP -3, S -1, Daichi -1, Mikaze -1 NRP -1, I -1 L +6, C +2, Ishin +5, Minna +4
National	48	D 16; L 12; K 7 C 3 PLP 3 S 2 Ishin 1 Mikaze 1 Daichi 1 NRP 1 I 1	D 13.4% of proportional votes→7 seats: Tetsuji Isozaki 271,553; Yoshifumi Hamano 235,917; Kumiko Aihara 235,636; Kusuo Ōshima 191,167; Mieko Kamimoto 176,248; Saori Yoshikawa 167,437; Toshio Ishigami 152,121; Takanori Kawai 138,830; Hajime Ishii 123,355... Toshiharu Todoroki 103,996; Marutei Tsurunen 82,858... Yoshikazu Tarui 13,178	D -9, PLP -3, S -1, Daichi -1, Mikaze -1 NRP -1, I -1 L +6, C +2, Ishin +5, Minna +4
National	48	D 16; L 12; K 7 C 3 PLP 3 S 2 Ishin 1 Mikaze 1 Daichi 1 NRP 1 I 1	Ishin 11.9% of proportional votes→6 seats: Antonio Inoki 356,605; Kyōko Nakayama 306,341; Mitsuo Gima 40,484; Takeshi Fujimaki 33,237; Masashi Nakano 32,926; Kunihiko Muroi 32,107; Hirokazu Tsuchida 28,616	D -9, PLP -3, S -1, Daichi -1, Mikaze -1 NRP -1, I -1 L +6, C +2, Ishin +5, Minna +4
National	48	D 16; L 12; K 7 C 3 PLP 3 S 2 Ishin 1 Mikaze 1 Daichi 1 NRP 1 I 1	C 9.7% of proportional votes→5 seats: Akira Koike 134,325; Yoshiki Yamashita 129,149; Tomoko Kami 68,729; Satoshi Inoue 50,874; Kōhei Nihi 39,768; Yūko Yamamoto 36,580	D -9, PLP -3, S -1, Daichi -1, Mikaze -1 NRP -1, I -1 L +6, C +2, Ishin +5, Minna +4
National	48	D 16; L 12; K 7 C 3 PLP 3 S 2 Ishin 1 Mikaze 1 Daichi 1 NRP 1 I 1	Minna 8.9% of proportional votes→4 seats: Ryūhei Kawada 117,389; Kazuyuki Yamaguchi 75,000; Michitarō Watanabe 50,253; Yoshiyuki Inoue 47,756; Jun'ichi Kawai 39,425	D -9, PLP -3, S -1, Daichi -1, Mikaze -1 NRP -1, I -1 L +6, C +2, Ishin +5, Minna +4
National	48	D 16; L 12; K 7 C 3 PLP 3 S 2 Ishin 1 Mikaze 1 Daichi 1 NRP 1 I 1	S 2.4% of proportional votes→1 seat: Seiji Mataichi 156,1555; Hiroji Yamashiro 112,641	D -9, PLP -3, S -1, Daichi -1, Mikaze -1 NRP -1, I -1 L +6, C +2, Ishin +5, Minna +4
National	48	D 16; L 12; K 7 C 3 PLP 3 S 2 Ishin 1 Mikaze 1 Daichi 1 NRP 1 I 1	Incumbents on other party lists without seat: PLP (1.8%): Tadashi Hirono, Yoshinobu Fujiwara; Daichi (1.0%): none Midori (0.9%): none Mikaze (0.8%): Kuniko Tanioka; HRP (0.4%): none	D -9, PLP -3, S -1, Daichi -1, Mikaze -1 NRP -1, I -1 L +6, C +2, Ishin +5, Minna +4
