= Masakazu Sekiguchi =

Japanese politician

- 関口 昌一
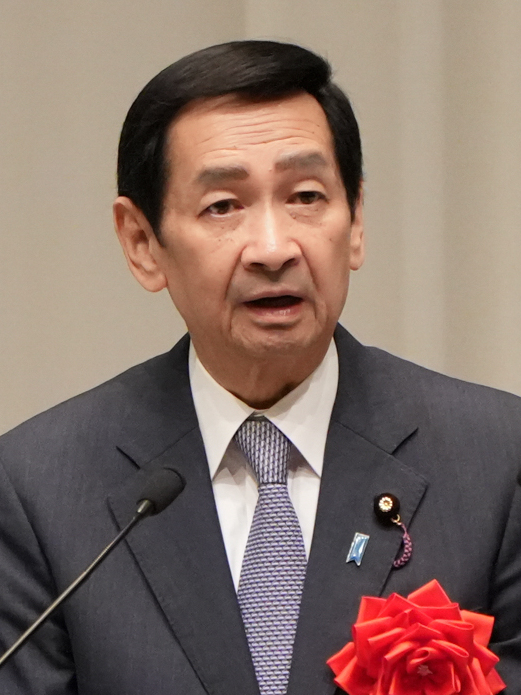
- Sekiguchi in 2025

President of the Senate of Japan
- Incumbent
- Assumed office 11 November 2024
- Monarch: Naruhito
- Vice President: Hiroyuki Nagahama; Tetsuro Fukuyama
- Preceded by: Hidehisa Otsuji

Senator of Japan from Saitama
- Incumbent
- Assumed office 26 October 2003
- Preceded by: Takujirō Hamada

Member of the Saitama Prefectural Assembly
- In office 1995–2003
- Constituency: Kita 2nd

Personal details
- Born: 4 June 1953 (age 73) Minano, Saitama, Japan
- Party: Liberal Democratic
- Education: Josai Dental University

Masakazu Sekiguchi (関口 昌一, Sekiguchi Masakazu; born June 4, 1953) is a Japanese politician of the Liberal Democratic Party who has served as the President of the Senate since 2024.

Born in Saitama Prefecture, Sekiguchi was a dentist and a member of the Saitama Prefectural Assembly before his first election to the Senate in 2003. He served as parliamentary vice minister for Foreign Affairs, senior vice minister for Internal Affairs and Communications and chairman of the LDP caucus in the Senate, before he was elected Senate President in 2024.

== Biography ==
Masakazu Sekiguchi was born on 4 June 1953 in Minano, Saitama, to a family of dentists. His father Keizo Sekiguchi was president of the Saitama Dental Association and a member of the Senate for the LDP from 1980 to 1992. Sekiguchi was educated at the Josai Dental University, currently Meikai University. After graduating in 1979, he worked at his family's dental clinic.

Sekiguchi was elected to the Saitama Prefectural Assembly in 1995, as a member of the LDP. In 2003 he ran for the Senate in Saitama at-large district by-election, as the incumbent Takujiro Hamada had resigned to run for governor. Sekiguchi defeated Chiyako Shimada of the Democratic Party and was elected for the first time. He has subsequently been returned four times.

In 2006, Sekiguchi received his first government position as parliamentary vice minister for foreign affairs under the First Abe Cabinet. He became chairman of the Senate Committee on Education, Culture, Sports, Science and Technology in the following year, serving until 2008. He then served as senior vice minister for Internal Affairs and Communications under the Second Abe Cabinet from September 2013 to September 2014.

Sekiguchi became Chairman of the Diet Affairs Committee for the LDP in the Senate in 2017. In 2019, he was elected Chairman of the LDP in the Senate. He was elected President of the Senate in November 2024, when Hidehisa Otsuji resigned for health reasons.

Senate
Preceded by Hidehisa Otsuji	President of the Senate; 2024–present	Incumbent
Preceded by Ichiro Ichikawa	Chairman of the Committee on Education, Culture, Sports, Science and Technology; 2007–2008	Succeeded by Masaharu Nakagawa
Party political offices
Preceded by Seiko Hashimoto	Chairman of the Liberal Democratic Party in the House of Councillors; 2019–2024	Succeeded by Keizō Takemi
Preceded by Masaji Matsuyama	Chairman of the Diet Affairs Committee for the Liberal Democratic Party in the House of Councillors; 2017–2019	Succeeded by Shinsuke Suematsu
