= Yakura =

Yakura is a surname. Notable people with the surname include:

- Katsuo Yakura (born 1975), Japanese politician
- Nyl Yakura (born 1993), Canadian badminton player
