= Chiyako =

- Gender: Female

Origin
- Origin: Japanese
- Meaning: Different meanings depending on the kanji used

Chiyako (written: 千夜子, 智哉子 or チヤコ in katakana) is a feminine Japanese given name. Notable people with the name include:

- Chiyako Sato (佐藤 千夜子; 1897–1968), Japanese singer
- Chiyako Shibahara (芝原 チヤコ; born 1970), Japanese voice actress
- Chiyako Shimada (島田 智哉子; born 1962), Japanese politician
