= Saitama at-large district =

Japan House of Councillors constituency

- 埼玉県選挙区
- Parliamentary constituency for the House of Councillors
- Prefecture: Saitama
- Electorate: 6,127,388 (as of July 2025)

Current constituency
- Created: 1947
- Seats: 8
- Councillors: Class of 2028: Masakazu Sekiguchi; Kiyoshi Ueda; Makoto Nishida; Mari Takagi; Class of 2031: Toshiharu Furukawa; Kumiko Ehara; Hiroto Kumagai; Tsutomu Ōtsu

Saitama at-large district (埼玉県選挙区, Saitama-ken senkyoku) is a four-member constituency of the House of Councillors, the upper house of the national Diet of Japan. It consists of Saitama and elects four Councillors for six-year terms every three years by single non-transferable vote.

Until a reapportionment in the 1990s, effective in the 1995 and 1998 Councillors elections, Saitama was a two-member district electing a total of four Councillors. Then again in 2018, the district had its fixed seat count increased from a total of six Councillors to eight Councillors. The new seats were filled in the 2019 and 2022 House of Councillors elections.

== Overview ==
The constituency represents the entire population of Saitama Prefecture. The district elects eight Councillors to six-year terms, four each at alternating elections held every three years. The district has 6,127,388 registered voters as of July 2025. The Councillors currently representing Saitama are:

- Masakazu Sekiguchi (Liberal Democratic Party (LDP), fifth term; term ends in 2028)
  - Sekiguchi has served as President of the House of Councillors since November 2024 and sits as an independent as a result.
- Kiyoshi Ueda (Democratic Party For the People (DPFP), second term; term ends in 2028)
- Makoto Nishida (Komeito, fourth term; term ends in 2028)
- Mari Takagi (Constitutional Democratic Party of Japan (CDP), first term; term ends in 2028)
- Toshiharu Furukawa (LDP, fourth term; term ends in 2031)
- Kumiko Ehara (DPFP, first term; term ends in 2031)
- Hiroto Kumagai (CDP, second term; term ends in 2031)
- Tsutomu Ōtsu (Sanseitō, first term; term ends in 2031)

== Elected Councillors ==
| Class of 1947/1953/... | | | | Election year | Class of 1950/1956/... | | | |
| #1 (1947: #1. 6 Year Term) | #2 (1947: #2, 6 Year Term) (1992: #3, 3 Year Term) | #3 | #4 | Election year | #1 (1947: #3, 3-year term) | #2 (1947: #4, 3-year term) | #3 | #4 |
|---|---|---|---|---|---|---|---|---|
| Eizo Kobayashi (LP) | Yataro Hiranuma (LP) | | | 1947 | Katsumasa Amada (JSP) | Kazue Ishikawa (DP) | | |
| Eizo Kobayashi (LP) | Yataro Hiranuma (LP) | | | 1950 | Yoshio Matsunaga (JSP) (Note: Died in 1955 while in office) | Shokichi Uehara (LP) | | |
| Eizo Kobayashi (Yoshida LP) | Katsumasa Amada (Right JSP) | | | 1953 | Yoshio Matsunaga (JSP) | Shokichi Uehara (LP) | | |
| Eizo Kobayashi (Yoshida LP) | Katsumasa Amada (Right JSP) | | | 1955 by el. | Ryusaku Endo (Ind.) | Shokichi Uehara (LP) | | |
| Eizo Kobayashi (Yoshida LP) | Katsumasa Amada (Right JSP) | | | 1956 | Yuichi Osawa (LDP) (Note: Resigned to run in 1960 Saitama gubernatorial election) | Shokichi Uehara (LDP) | | |
| Eizo Kobayashi (LDP) | Katsumasa Amada (JSP) (Note: Died in 1965 while in office) | | | 1959 | Yuichi Osawa (LDP) | Shokichi Uehara (LDP) | | |
| Eizo Kobayashi (LDP) | Katsumasa Amada (JSP) | | | 1960 by el. | Kanzo Oizumi (LDP) | Shokichi Uehara (LDP) | | |
| Eizo Kobayashi (LDP) | Katsumasa Amada (JSP) | | | 1962 | Shokichi Uehara (LDP) | Hideyuki Seya (JSP) | | |
| Katsuji Mori (JSP) | Yoshio Tsuchiya (LDP) | | | 1965 | Shokichi Uehara (LDP) | Hideyuki Seya (JSP) | | |
| Katsuji Mori (JSP) | Yoshio Tsuchiya (LDP) | | | 1968 | Shokichi Uehara (LDP) | Hideyuki Seya (JSP) | | |
| Yoshio Tsuchiya (LDP) | Katsuji Mori (JSP) | | | 1971 | Shokichi Uehara (LDP) | Hideyuki Seya (JSP) | | |
| Yoshio Tsuchiya (LDP) | Katsuji Mori (JSP) | | | 1974 | Hideyuki Seya (JSP) | Shokichi Uehara (LDP) | | |
| Yoshio Tsuchiya (LDP) | Juro Morita (NLC) | | | 1977 | Hideyuki Seya (JSP) | Shokichi Uehara (LDP) | | |
| Yoshio Tsuchiya (LDP) | Juro Morita (NLC) | | | 1980 | Ryoko Nao (LDP) | Hideyuki Seya (JSP) | | |
| Yoshio Tsuchiya (LDP) | Juro Morita (NLC) | | | 1983 | Ryoko Nao (LDP) | Hideyuki Seya (JSP) | | |
| Yoshio Tsuchiya (LDP) | Juro Morita (NLC) | | | 1986 | Hideyuki Seya (JSP) | Ryoko Nao (LDP) | | |
| Hajime Fukuda (JSP) | Yoshio Tsuchiya (Ind.) (Note: Resigned to run in 1992 Saitama gubernatorial election) | | | 1989 | Hideyuki Seya (JSP) | Ryoko Nao (LDP) | | |
| Hajime Fukuda (JSP) | Taizo Sato (LDP) | | | 1991 by-el. | Hideyuki Seya (JSP) | Noriyuki Sekine (LDP) | | |
| Hajime Fukuda (JSP) | Taizo Sato (LDP) | | | 1992 (including by-el.) | Noriyuki Sekine (LDP) | Hideyuki Seya (JSP) | | |
| Hiroshi Takano (NFP) | Taizo Sato (LDP) | Sachiyo Abe (JCP) | | 1995 | Noriyuki Sekine (LDP) | Hideyuki Seya (JSP) | | |
| Hiroshi Takano (NFP) | Taizo Sato (LDP) | Sachiyo Abe (JCP) | | 1998 | Takujiro Hamada (Ind.) (Note: Resigned to run in 2003 Saitama gubernatorial election) | Renzo Togashi (JCP) | Toshio Fuji (DPJ) | |
| Taizo Sato (LDP) | Hiroshi Takano (Komeito) | Ryuji Yamane (DPJ) | | 2001 | Takujiro Hamada (Ind.) | Renzo Togashi (JCP) | Toshio Fuji (DPJ) | |
| Taizo Sato (LDP) | Hiroshi Takano (Komeito) | Ryuji Yamane (DPJ) | | 2003 by-el. | Masakazu Sekiguchi (LDP) | Renzo Togashi (JCP) | Toshio Fuji (DPJ) | |
| Taizo Sato (LDP) | Hiroshi Takano (Komeito) | Ryuji Yamane (DPJ) | | 2004 | Chiyako Shimada (DPJ) | Masakazu Sekiguchi (LDP) | Makoto Nishida (Komeito) | |
| Kuniko Koda (DPJ) | Toshiharu Furukawa (LDP) | Ryuji Yamane (DPJ) | | 2007 | Chiyako Shimada (DPJ) | Masakazu Sekiguchi (LDP) | Makoto Nishida (Komeito) | |
| Kuniko Koda (DPJ) | Toshiharu Furukawa (LDP) | Ryuji Yamane (DPJ) | | 2010 | Masakazu Sekiguchi (LDP) | Makoto Nishida (Komeito) | Motohiro Ōno (DPJ) | |
| Toshiharu Furukawa (LDP) | Katsuo Yakura (Komeito) | Kuniko Koda (Your Party) | | 2013 | Masakazu Sekiguchi (LDP) | Makoto Nishida (Komeito) | Motohiro Ōno (DPJ) | |
| Toshiharu Furukawa (LDP) | Katsuo Yakura (Komeito) | Kuniko Koda (Your Party) | | 2016 | Masakazu Sekiguchi (LDP) | Motohiro Ōno (DPJ) (Note: Resigned to run in 2019 Saitama gubernatorial election) | Makoto Nishida (Komeito) | |
| Toshiharu Furukawa (LDP) | Hiroto Kumagai (CDP) | Katsuo Yakura (Komeito) | Gaku Ito (JCP) | 2019 | Masakazu Sekiguchi (LDP) | Motohiro Ōno (DPJ) | Makoto Nishida (Komeito) | |
| Toshiharu Furukawa (LDP) | Hiroto Kumagai (CDP) | Katsuo Yakura (Komeito) | Gaku Ito (JCP) | 2019 by-el. | Masakazu Sekiguchi (LDP) | Kiyoshi Ueda (Ind.) (Note: Joined Democratic Party For the People in September 2025) | Makoto Nishida (Komeito) | |
| Toshiharu Furukawa (LDP) | Hiroto Kumagai (CDP) | Katsuo Yakura (Komeito) | Gaku Ito (JCP) | 2022 | Masakazu Sekiguchi (LDP) | Kiyoshi Ueda (Ind.) | Makoto Nishida (Komeito) | Mari Takagi (CDP) |
| Toshiharu Furukawa (LDP) | Hiroto Kumagai (CDP) | Kumiko Ehara (DPFP) | Tsutomu Ōtsu (Sanseitō) | 2025 | Masakazu Sekiguchi (LDP) | Kiyoshi Ueda (Ind.) | Makoto Nishida (Komeito) | Mari Takagi (CDP) |

Party affiliations as of election day.

== Election results ==
=== Elections in the 2020s ===
2025: Saitama at-large 4 seats
| Party | Candidate | Votes | % | ±% |
|---|---|---|---|---|
| LDP | Toshiharu Furukawa | 573,114 | 16.78 | ▼7.29 |
| DPP | Kumiko Ehara | 535,706 | 15.69 | new |
| CDP | Hiroto Kumagai | 480,330 | 14.06 | ▼0.65 |
| Sanseitō | Tsutomu Ōtsu | 465,278 | 13.62 | ▲10.65 |
| Komeito (LDP) | Katsuo Yakura | 441,613 | 12.93 | ▼2.85 |
| JCP | Gaku Itō | 227,488 | 6.66 | ▼1.18 |
| Reiwa | Nanae Sakurai | 198,936 | 5.82 | ▲1.79 |
| Ishin | Miyumi Ryūno | 150,475 | 4.41 | ▼6.33 |
| CPJ | Tetsunobu Ishihama | 129,130 | 3.78 | new |
| Team Mirai | Kazuko Mutō | 83,957 | 2.46 | new |
| Social Democratic | Tamaki Takai | 50,335 | 1.47 | |
| Anti-NHK | Shinichi Yamada | 26,469 | 0.78 | Steady |
| Shinseikai | Yūka Masuyama | 25,312 | 0.74 | new |
| Independent | Yoshihide Saitō | 19,190 | 0.56 | new |
| Reform Party | Daisaku Tsumura | 7,992 | 0.23 | new |
| Turnout | | | 56.88 | ▲6.63 |
| Registered electors | | 6,127,388 | | ▼18,684 |
| Party total seats | | Won | Total | Change |
| Liberal Democratic | | 1 | 2 | Steady |
| Constitutional Democratic | | 1 | 2 | Steady |
| Democratic Party For the People | | 1 | 1 | ▲1 |
| Sanseitō | | 1 | 1 | ▲1 |
| Kōmeitō | | 0 | 1 | ▼1 |
| Independent | | 0 | 1 | Steady |
| Communist | | 0 | 0 | ▼1 |
| Total | | 4 | 8 | N/A |

2022: Saitama at-large 4 seats
| Party | Candidate | Votes | % | ±% |
|---|---|---|---|---|
| LDP | Masakazu Sekiguchi | 727,232 | 24.1 | |
| Independent | Kiyoshi Ueda (endorsed by DPFP) | 501,820 | 16.6 | |
| Komeito | Makoto Nishida (endorsed by LDP) | 476,642 | 15.8 | |
| CDP | Mari Takagi | 444,567 | 14.7 | |
| Ishin | Takeyoshi Kaku | 324,476 | 10.7 | |
| JCP | Saeko Umemura | 236,899 | 7.8 | |
| Reiwa | Miyuka Nishi | 121,769 | 4.0 | |
| Sanseito | Hitoshi Sakaue | 89,693 | 3.0 | |
| Independent | Yasushi Takahashi | 22,613 | 0.7 | |
| Anti-NHK | Yūsuke Kawai | 18,194 | 0.6 | |
| Happiness Realization | Yūko Minato | 15,389 | 0.5 | |
| Anti-NHK | Hiroshi Kobayashi | 13,966 | 0.5 | |
| Anti-NHK | Naoki Miyagawa | 12,279 | 0.4 | |
| Japan First | Sasami Horikiri | 8,588 | 0.3 | |
| Anti-NHK | Takao Ike | 7,178 | 0.2 | |
| Turnout | | | 50.25 | |

=== Elections in the 2010s ===
2019 by-election: Saitama at-large 1 seat
| Party | Candidate | Votes | % | ±% |
|---|---|---|---|---|
| Independent | Kiyoshi Ueda | 1,065,390 | 86.4 | |
| Anti-NHK | Takashi Tachibana | 168,289 | 13.6 | |
| Turnout | | | 20.81 | |

2019: Saitama at-large 4 seats
| Party | Candidate | Votes | % | ±% |
|---|---|---|---|---|
| LDP | Toshiharu Furukawa | 786,479 | 28.2 | |
| CDP | Hiroto Kumagai | 536,338 | 19.3 | |
| Komeito | Katsuo Yakura (endorsed by LDP) | 532,302 | 19.1 | |
| JCP | Gaku Itō | 359,297 | 12.9 | |
| DPP | Chie Shishido | 244,399 | 8.8 | |
| Ishin | Ryō Sawada | 204,075 | 7.3 | |
| Anti-NHK | Erii Satō | 80,741 | 2.9 | |
| Consideration the Euthanasia System | Ryōji Samejima | 21,153 | 0.8 | |
| Happiness Realization | Ichirō Kojima | 19,515 | 0.7 | |
| Turnout | | | 46.48 | |

2016: Saitama at-large 3 seats
| Party | Candidate | Votes | % | ±% |
|---|---|---|---|---|
| LDP | Masakazu Sekiguchi | 898,827 | 29.2 | |
| Democratic | Motohiro Ōno (endorsed by PLP) | 676,828 | 22.0 | |
| Komeito | Makoto Nishida (endorsed by LDP) | 642,597 | 20.9 | |
| JCP | Gaku Itō (endorsed by PLP) | 486,778 | 15.8 | |
| Ishin | Ryō Sawada (endorsed by Genzei Nippon) | 228,472 | 7.4 | |
| Japanese Kokoro | Tomoko Sasaki | 118,030 | 3.8 | |
| Happiness Realization | Ichirō Kojima | 27,283 | 0.9 | |
| Turnout | | | 51.94 | |

2013: Saitama at-large 3 seats
| Party | Candidate | Votes | % | ±% |
|---|---|---|---|---|
| LDP | Toshiharu Furukawa | 1,000,725 | 34.05 | |
| Komeito | Katsuo Yakura | 599,755 | 20.41 | |
| Your | Kuniko Kōda | 485,559 | 16.52 | |
| Democratic | Ryūji Yamane | 389,625 | 13.26 | |
| JCP | Gaku Itō | 353,594 | 12.03 | |
| Social Democratic | Yasumasa Kawakami | 65,749 | 2.24 | |
| Happiness Realization | Miho Tanii | 22,345 | 0.76 | |
| Association for Creating Saitama's Future | Teruhiko Mayanaga | 21,358 | 0.73 | |
| Turnout | | | 51.21 | |

2010
| Party | Candidate | Votes | % | ±% |
|---|---|---|---|---|
| LDP | Masakazu Sekiguchi | 655,028 | 20.6 | |
| Kōmeitō | Makoto Nishida | 594,678 | 18.7 | |
| DPJ | Motohiro Ōno | 557,398 | 17.5 | |
| DPJ | Chiyako Shimada | 544,381 | 17.1 | |
| YP | Tsukasa Kobayashi | 416,663 | 13.1 | |
| JCP | Gaku Itō | 207,957 | 6.5 | |
| NRP | Kōji Nakagawa | 84,897 | 2.7 | |
| SDP | Fumihiro Himori | 72,185 | 2.3 | |
| Independent | Kōsei Hasegawa | 37,731 | 1.2 | |
| HRP | Hirotoshi Inda | 9,536 | 0.3 | |
| Turnout | | 3,246,247 | 55.83 | |

=== Elections in the 2000s ===
2007
| Party | Candidate | Votes | % | ±% |
|---|---|---|---|---|
| DPJ | Kuniko Kōda | 745,517 | 23.5 | |
| LDP | Toshiharu Furukawa | 684,270 | 21.6 | |
| DPJ | Ryūji Yamane | 665,063 | 21.0 | |
| Kōmeitō | Hiroshi Takano | 623,723 | 19.7 | |
| JCP | Sumiko Ayabe | 277,440 | 8.7 | |
| SDP | Etsuko Matsuzawa | 104,403 | 3.3 | |
| PNP | Tetsuo Sawada | 72,756 | 2.3 | |
| Turnout | | 3,227,638 | 56.35 | |
