= Motohiro Ōno =

Japanese politician

- 大野 元裕
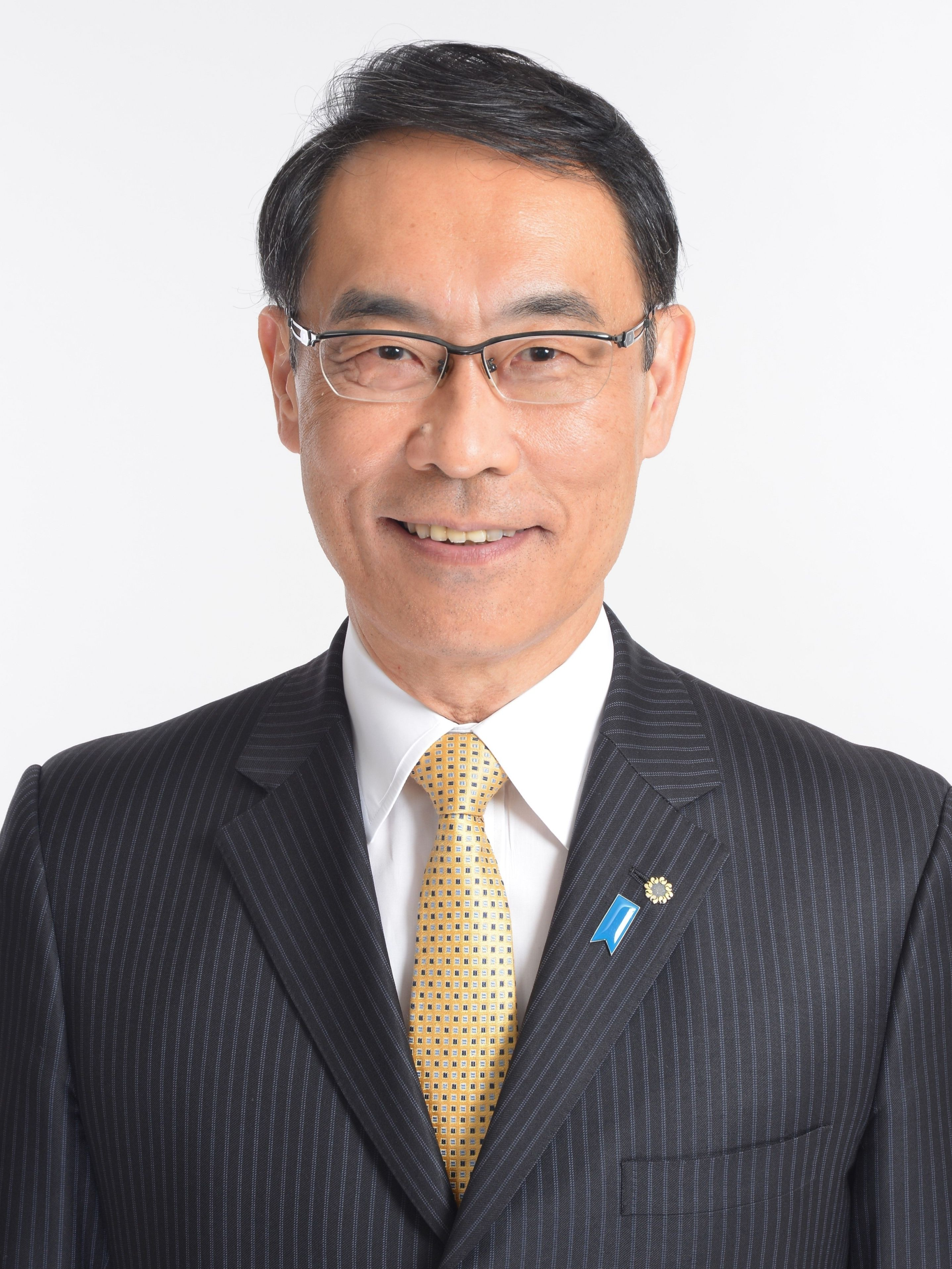
- Official portrait, 2020

Governor of Saitama Prefecture
- Incumbent
- Assumed office 31 August 2019
- Monarch: Naruhito
- Preceded by: Kiyoshi Ueda

Member of the House of Councillors
- In office 26 July 2010 – 5 August 2019
- Preceded by: Chiyako Shimada
- Succeeded by: Kiyoshi Ueda
- Constituency: Saitama at-large

Personal details
- Born: 12 November 1963 (age 62) Kawaguchi, Saitama, Japan
- Party: Independent (since 2019)
- Other political affiliations: DPJ (2010–2016); DP (2016–2018); DPP (2018–2019)
- Education: International University of Japan; Keio University

Motohiro Ōno (大野 元裕, Ōno Motohiro; born 12 November 1963) is a Japanese politician and the current governor of Saitama Prefecture in Japan. He assumed office replacing Kiyoshi Ueda in the August 2019 gubernatorial elections.

Ōno previously served as a member of the House of Councilors from 2010 to 2019 and was a senior researcher at the Middle East Institute of Japan.
