= Noriyuki Sekine =

Japanese politician (1931–2022)

- 関根 則之

Member of the House of Councillors
- In office 16 June 1991 – 25 July 1998
- Preceded by: Ryōkō Nao
- Succeeded by: Takujirō Hamada
- Constituency: Saitama at-large

Personal details
- Born: 13 January 1931 Yoshimi, Saitama, Japan
- Died: 19 June 2022 (aged 91) Kawagoe, Saitama, Japan
- Party: Liberal Democratic
- Education: University of Tokyo

Noriyuki Sekine (Japanese: 関根則之 Sekine Noriyuki; 13 January 1931 – 19 June 2022) was a Japanese politician.

A member of the Liberal Democratic Party, he served in the House of Councillors from 1991 to 1998.

Sekine died in Kawagoe, Saitama on 19 June 2022 at the age of 91.
