= Chiyako Shimada =

Japanese politician

- 島田 智哉子

Member of the House of Councillors
- In office 26 July 2004 – 25 July 2010
- Preceded by: Toshio Fujii
- Succeeded by: Motohiro Ōno
- Constituency: Saitama at-large

Personal details
- Born: 27 September 1962 (age 64) Ōmuta, Fukuoka, Japan
- Party: Liberal Democratic
- Other political affiliations: Democratic (2003–2012)
- Education: Saga Women's Junior College
- Alma mater: Meikai University

Chiyako Shimada (島田 智哉子; born September 27, 1962) is a Japanese politician of the Democratic Party of Japan, who is a former member of the House of Councillors in the Diet (national legislature) from the Saitama at-large district. A native of Fukuoka Prefecture and graduate of Saga Women's Junior College and Meikai University, she was elected for the first time in 2003.
