= Makoto Nishida =

Japanese politician

- 西田 実仁
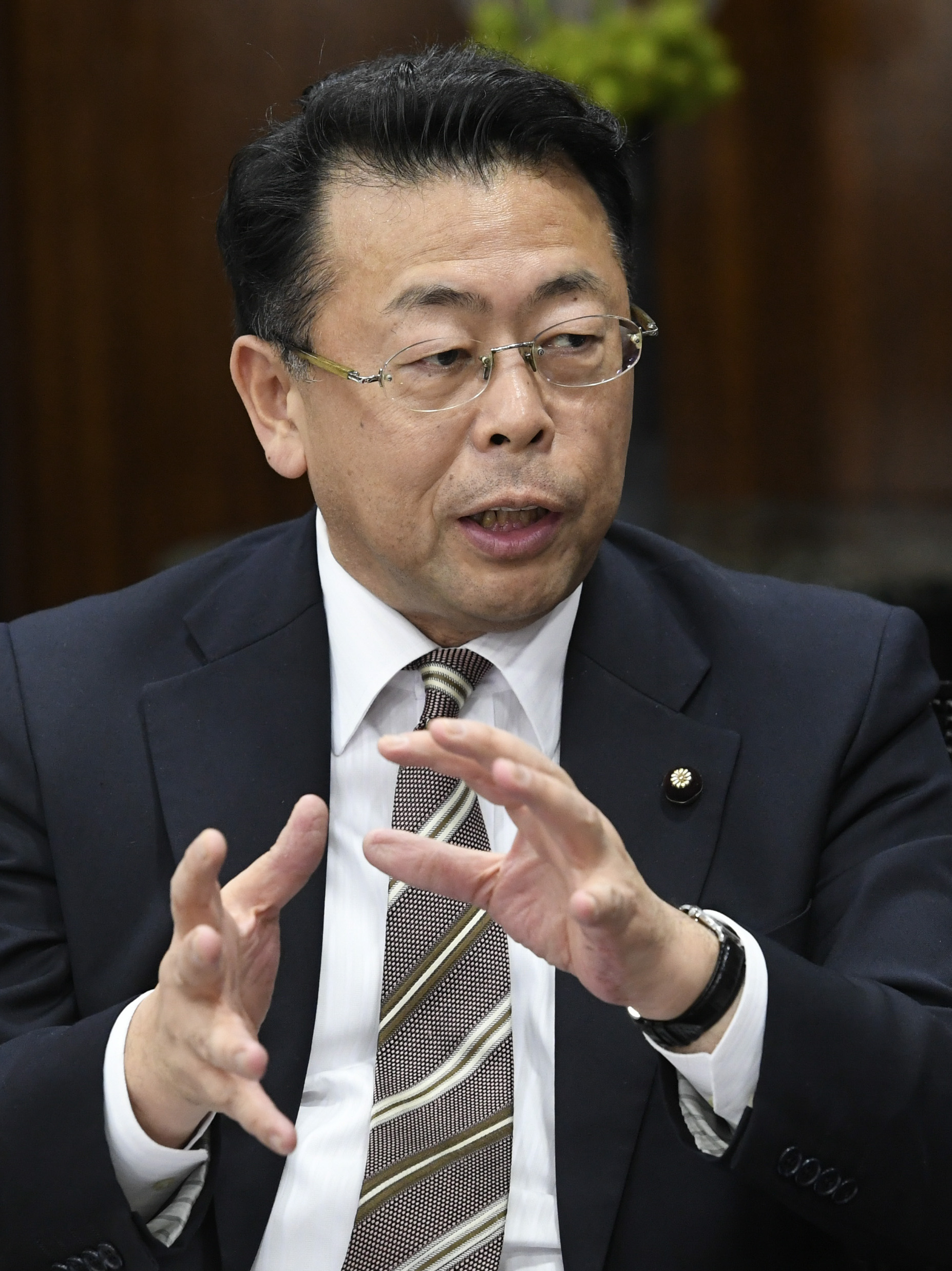
- Nishida in 2020

Member of the House of Councillors
- Incumbent
- Assumed office 12 July 2004
- Preceded by: Renzō Togashi
- Constituency: Saitama at-large

Personal details
- Born: 27 August 1962 (age 64) Nishitokyo, Tokyo, Japan
- Party: Komeito
- Education: Keio Senior High School
- Alma mater: Keio University; Beijing Language and Culture University

Makoto Nishida (西田 実仁, Nishida Makoto; born 27 August 1962) is a Japanese politician who serves as secretary general of the Komeito since 2024. He has served as a member of the House of Councillors since 2004.

== Early life and education ==
Makoto Nishida was born in Tanashi, Tokyo, on 27 August 1962. He graduated from Keio Senior High School 1981 and enrolled at Keio University, where he studied economics. In his second year he did an exchange term at the Beijing Language and Culture University. After graduating from Keio University in 1986 he worked as a journalist at Toyo Keizai before entering politics.

== Political career ==
Nishida was first elected to the House of Councillors in 2004 as the Komeito candidate in Saitama at-large district. In 2013, Nishida became secretary general for the Komeito caucus in the House of Councillors. From October 2018 he concurrently serves as Nishida head of the Komeito's tax panel. The following year he was promoted to chairman of the Komeito caucus in the House of Councillors and he continued in the post until 2024, while also serving concurrently as chairman of the election strategy committee from 2020 to 2021 and from 2022 to 2024.

Nishida was appointed secretary general when Keiichi Ishii became party president in September 2024.

Party political offices
Preceded by Yuichiro Uozumi	Chairman of the Komeito in the House of Councillors; 2019-2024	Succeeded by Masaaki Taniai
Preceded by Shigeki Sato	Chairman of the Election Strategy Committee, Komeito; 2020-2021	Succeeded by Yōsuke Takagi
Preceded by Yōsuke Takagi	Chairman of the Election Strategy Committee, Komeito; 2022-2024	Succeeded by Nobuhiro Miura
Preceded by Keiichi Ishii	Secretary General of the Komeito; 2024–present	Incumbent
