= Kiyoshi Ueda =

Japanese politician

- 上田 清司
- Official portrait, 2017

Senator of Japan from Saitama
- Incumbent
- Assumed office 28 October 2019
- Preceded by: Motohiro Ōno

Chairman of the National Governors Association of Japan
- In office 17 April 2018 – 30 August 2019
- Preceded by: Keiji Yamada
- Succeeded by: Kamon Iizumi

Governor of Saitama Prefecture
- In office 1 September 2003 – 30 August 2019
- Monarchs: Akihito; Naruhito
- Preceded by: Yoshihiko Tsuchiya
- Succeeded by: Motohiro Ōno

Member of the House of Representatives
- In office 19 July 1993 – 13 August 2003
- Preceded by: Hiroshi Sawada
- Succeeded by: Hideo Jinpu
- Constituency: Saitama 5th (1993–1996); Saitama 4th (1996–2003)

Personal details
- Born: 15 May 1948 (age 78) Fukuoka, Japan
- Party: Democratic Party For the People (since 2025)
- Other political affiliations: NLC (1980–1986); LDP (1986–1993); JRP (1993–1994); NFP (1994–1997); From Five (1997–1998); GGP (1998); DPJ (1998–2003); Independent (2003–2025)
- Education: Hosei University (B.L.); Waseda University (Master's degree in Political Science)

Kiyoshi Ueda (上田 清司, Ueda Kiyoshi; born 15 May 1948) is a Japanese politician currently serving as a member of the Senate for the Saitama at-large district after winning a by-election in 2019. He has signed the Taxpayer Protection Pledge, signaling his opposition to any and all tax increases. He previously served as governor of Saitama Prefecture from 2003 to 2019, when he subsequently retired.
