= Gaku Ito =

Japanese politician

- 伊藤 岳
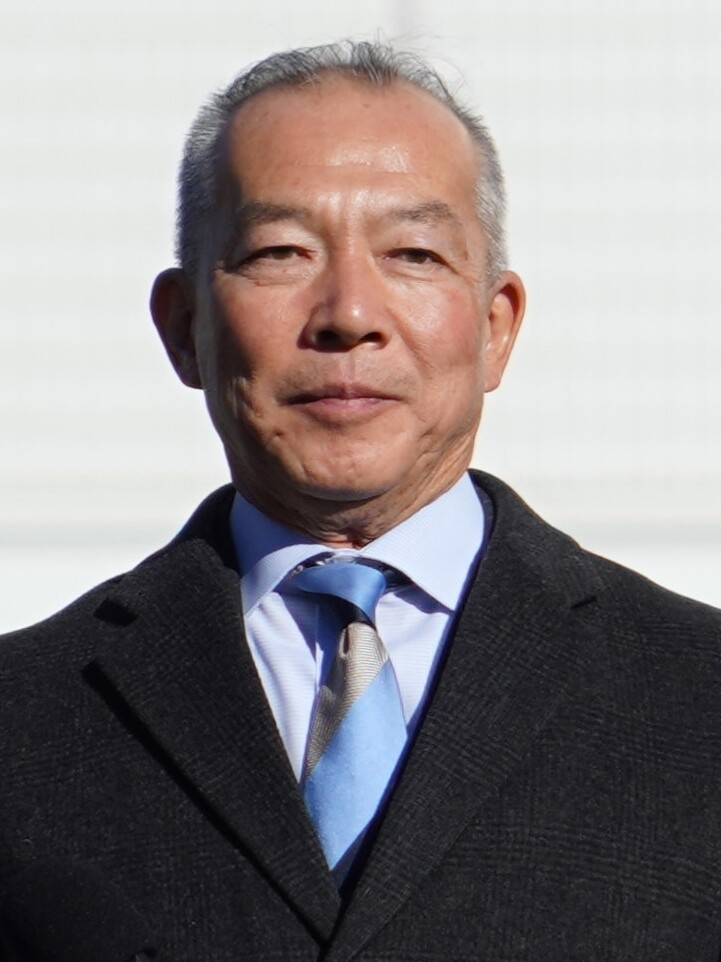
- Ito in 2025

Member of the House of Councillors
- In office 29 July 2019 – 28 July 2025
- Constituency: Saitama at-large

Personal details
- Born: 6 March 1960 (age 66) Kawaguchi, Saitama, Japan
- Party: Communist
- Education: Bunkyo University

Gaku Ito (born March 6, 1960, in Saitama Prefecture) is a Japanese politician who has served as a member of the House of Councillors of Japan from 2019 to 2025. He represented the Saitama at-large district and is a member of the Japanese Communist Party.

He was defeated in the July 2025 House of Councillors election.
