= Ryuji Yamane =

Japanese politician (1948–2022)

- 山根 隆治
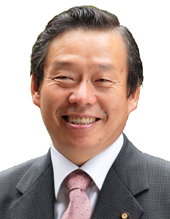
- Official portrait, 2012

Member of the House of Councillors
- In office 29 July 2001 – 28 July 2013
- Preceded by: Sachiyo Abe
- Succeeded by: Katsuo Yakura
- Constituency: Saitama at-large

Member of the Saitama Prefectural Assembly
- In office 1995–2001
- Constituency: West 7th

Member of the Kawagoe City Council
- In office 1976–1995

Personal details
- Born: 8 March 1948 Toshima, Tokyo, Japan
- Died: 10 December 2022 (aged 74) Kawagoe, Saitama, Japan
- Party: Democratic (2001–2016)
- Other political affiliations: DSP (1976–1994); Independent (1994–2001)
- Education: Saitama University

Ryuji Yamane (山根 隆治, Yamane Ryūji; 8 March 1948 – 10 December 2022) was a Japanese politician of the Democratic Party of Japan, a member of the House of Councillors in the Diet (national legislature).

== Early life ==
Yamane was a native of Toshima, Tokyo. He attended Saitama University, but dropped out before graduation.

== Political career ==
Yamane served in the city assembly of Kawagoe, Saitama for four terms from 1979 and then in the assembly of Saitama Prefecture for two terms from 1995. He served in both assemblies as a member of the Democratic Socialist Party. In 2001, he was elected to the House of Councillors for the first time, serving two terms until July 2013.

== Family ==
Yamane’s daughter, Fumiko also served on the Kawagoe city assembly, and Saitama Prefecture aeesmbly.
