= Hiroto Kumagai =

Japanese politician

- 熊谷 裕人
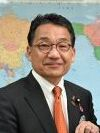

Member of the House of Councillors
- Incumbent
- Assumed office 29 July 2019
- Preceded by: Kuniko Koda
- Constituency: Saitama at-large

Member of the Saitama City Council
- In office 1 May 2007 – 30 April 2019
- Constituency: Ōmiya Ward

Personal details
- Born: 23 March 1962 (age 64) Ōmiya, Saitama, Japan
- Party: CDP (since 2017)
- Other political affiliations: DSP (1992–1994); New Frontier (1994–1998); New Fraternity (1998); DPJ (1998–2016); DP (2016–2017)
- Education: Chuo University

Hiroto Kumagai is a Japanese politician who is a member of the House of Councillors of Japan. He represents the Saitama at-large district.

== Biography ==
He was born on March 23, 1962, and graduated from Chuo University. Afterwards, he joined Lotteria, a chain of fast-food restaurant for a year. He later joined the Policy Secretary to Kazuhito Wada and Mie Ishida. In 2007, he was a member of the Saitama City Assembly for three terms. In 2019, he was elected to the House of Councillors.
