= Saga Women's Junior College =

Coordinates: 33°14′48.7″N 130°17′15.3″E

Saga Women's Junior College (佐賀女子短期大学, Saga joshi tanki daigaku) is a private junior college in Saga, Saga, Japan.

== History ==
The history of the school began in 1897 when Yasu Nakajima (1876–1951) opened a private academy in her home. The private academy developed into Saga Girls' Sewing School in 1923, then into Saga Asahi Girl's High School in 1948. In 1966 the school foundation Asahi Gakuen established Saga Women's Junior College with the Department of Domestic Science.

== Organization ==
- Department of Child Studies
- Department of Health and Welfare
- Department of Career Design
- Advanced Course of Child Studies (1-year course)
