= Toshiharu Furukawa =

Japanese politician

- 古川 俊治
- Official portrait, 2026

Minister for Digital Transformation
- Incumbent
- Assumed office 17 September 2026
- Prime Minister: Sanae Takaichi
- Preceded by: Hisashi Matsumoto

Member of the House of Councillors
- Incumbent
- Assumed office 29 July 2007
- Preceded by: Taizō Satō
- Constituency: Saitama at-large

Personal details
- Born: 14 January 1963 (age 63) Iwatsuki, Saitama, Japan
- Party: Liberal Democratic
- Education: Keio University; University of Oxford

Toshiharu Furukawa (古川 俊治, Furukawa Toshiharu; born 14 January 1963) is a Japanese medical doctor, attorney, and politician of the Liberal Democratic Party.

== Early life ==
Furukawa attended Keio University, receiving his M.D. in 1987, followed by a Ph.D. in medical science in 1994 and LL.B. in 1996. He attended the Legal Research Training Institute from 1997 to 1999 to be qualified as an attorney, and obtained his MBA at Saïd Business School in 2005.

== Academic career ==
Furukawa served as assistant professor/professor of medicine at Keio from 1999, and as a part-time lecturer in medicine at Hirosaki University from 2001 to 2012. He is also founder and Chief Executive Officer of GBS Laboratory.

== Political career ==
Furukawa was elected to the House of Councillors in the 2007 election and re-elected in the 2013 election. He represents Saitama Prefecture for the Liberal Democratic Party and Party for Japanese Kokoro. He previously served as Chairman of the Committee on Financial Affairs, and is currently a member of the Committee on Judicial Affairs, Committee on Audit, and Commission on the Constitution.

He serves as counsel to TMI Associates, a law firm in Tokyo.
