= Meikai University =

Coordinates: 35°38′30.17″N 139°55′24.46″E

- 明海大学; Meikai daigaku
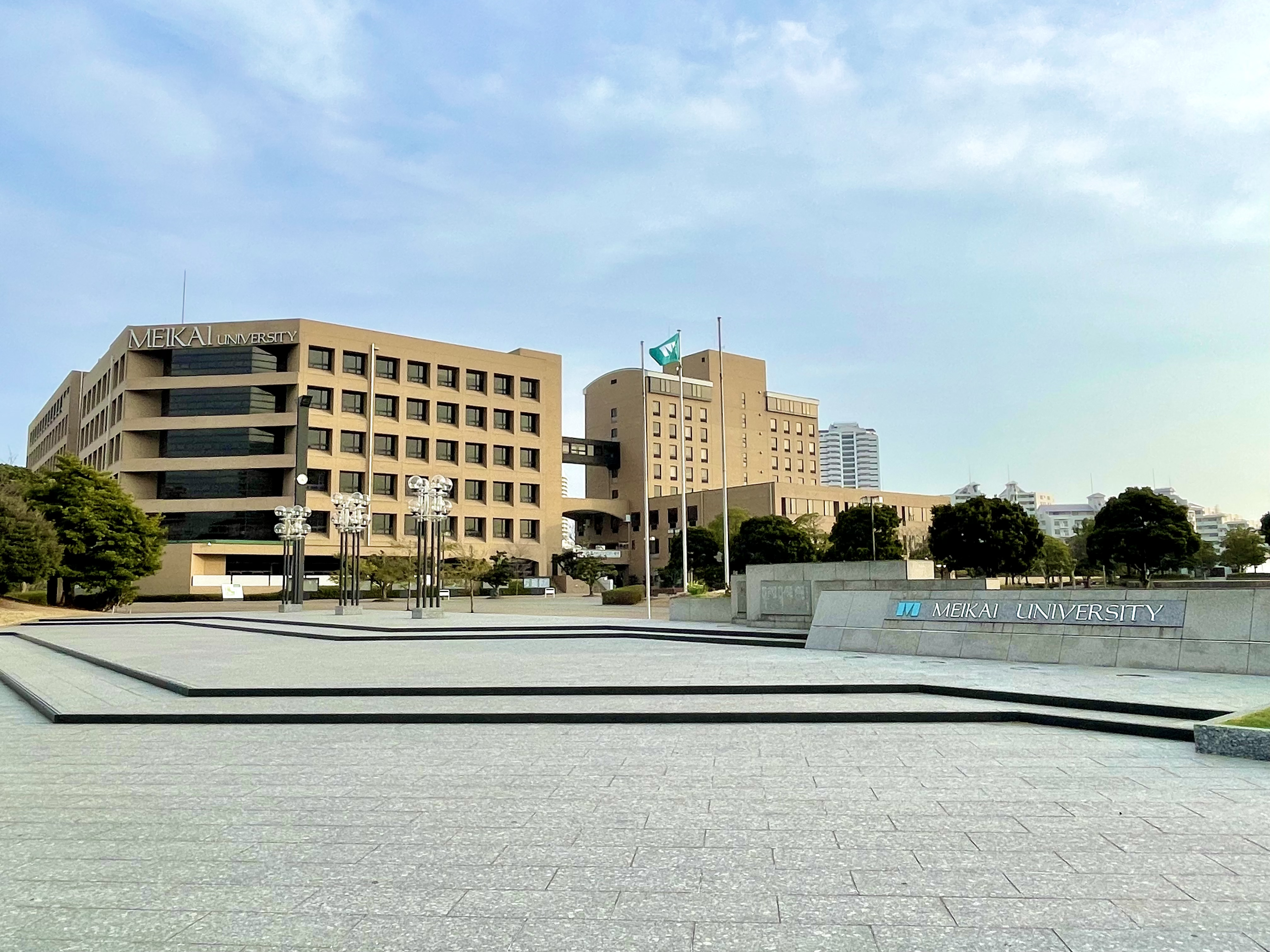
- Type: Private
- Established: 1988
- Location: Urayasu, Chiba Prefecture, Japan
- Website: www.meikai.ac.jp/english/index.html

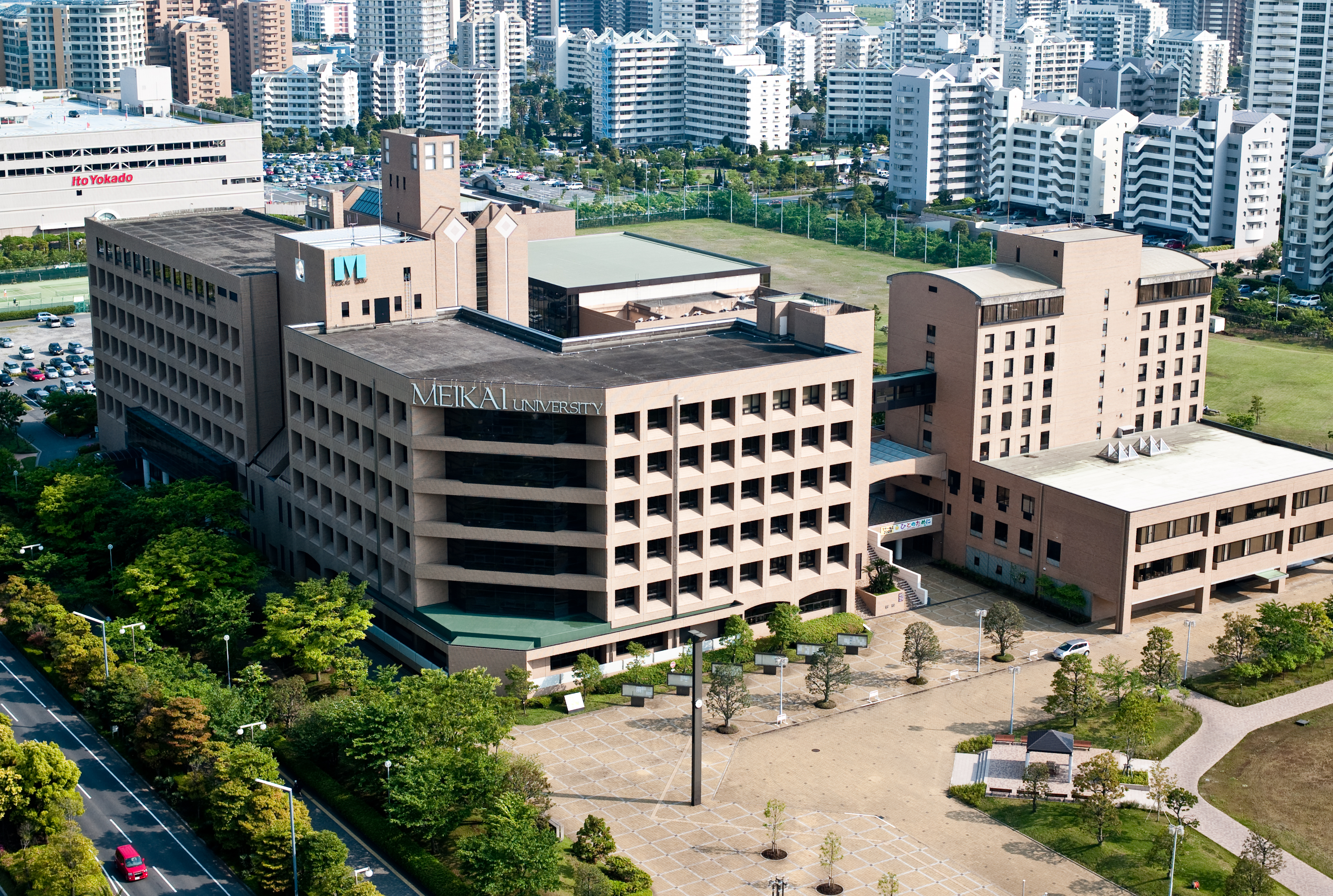
Urayasu Campus

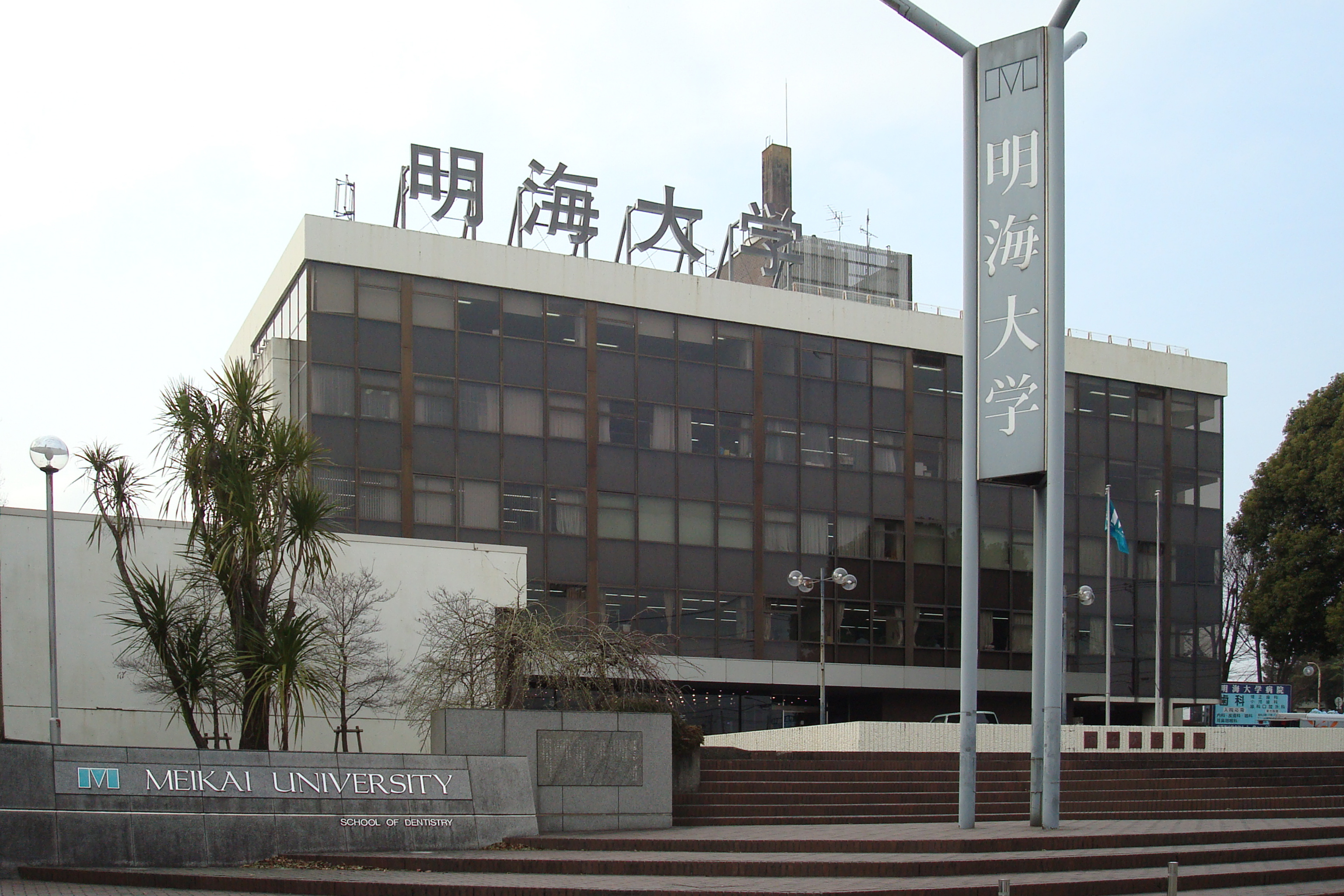
Sakado campus (School of Dentistry)

Meikai University (明海大学, Meikai daigaku) is a private university in Urayasu, Chiba, Japan.

== History ==
The university was founded in 1970, and obtained its present name in 1988.

== Faculties ==
- Faculty of Dentistry
- Faculty of Health and Medical Sciences
- Faculty of Hospitality and Tourism
- Faculty of Real Estate
- Faculty of Economics
- Faculty of Foreign Languages
