= Kuniko Koda =

Japanese politician

- 行田 邦子

Mayor of Gyōda
- Incumbent
- Assumed office 1 May 2023
- Preceded by: Naohiko Ishii

Member of the House of Councillors
- In office 29 July 2007 – 28 July 2019
- Preceded by: Hiroshi Takano
- Succeeded by: Hiroto Kumagai
- Constituency: Saitama at-large

Personal details
- Born: 8 September 1965 (age 61) Tōno, Iwate, Japan
- Party: Independent (2014–2017; 2019–2020; 2023–present)
- Other political affiliations: DPJ (2004–2012); Green Wind (2012–2013); Your Party (2013–2014); Kibō no Tō (2017–2019); LDP (2020–2023)
- Education: International Christian University; Nihon University

Kuniko Koda (行田 邦子, Kōda Kuniko; born 8 September 1965) is a Japanese politician who is the mayor of Gyōda and a former member of the House of Councillors in the Diet (national legislature).

== Early life and education ==
Koda was born in Tono City, Iwate Prefecture, on 8 September 1965. She graduated from International Christian University's social sciences division in 1989.

== Career ==
Kouda worked for 18 years at private sector, including an advertising agency and liquor company. In 2003, she joined the Democratic Party of Japan (DPJ). She was elected to the House of Councillors from the Saitama Prefecture for the first time on 29 July 2007. She and other three lawmakers from the DPJ resigned from the party in protest of the then prime minister Yoshihiko Noda's decision to restart the nuclear plant in Oi, Fukui Prefecture in July 2012.
