= Katsuo Yakura =

Japanese politician

- 矢倉 克夫
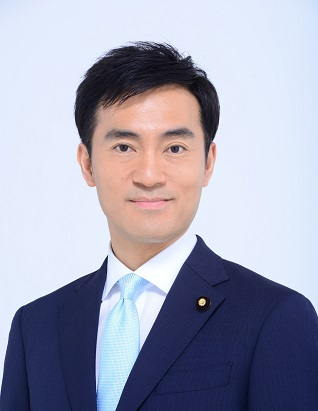
- Official portrait, 2018

Member of the House of Councillors
- In office 29 July 2013 – 28 July 2025
- Preceded by: Ryuji Yamane
- Constituency: Saitama at-large

Personal details
- Born: 11 January 1975 (age 51) Yokohama, Kanagawa, Japan
- Party: Komeito
- Education: University of Tokyo; University of California, Los Angeles

Katsuo Yakura (矢倉 克夫, Yakura Katsuo; born January 11, 1975) is a Japanese politician who served as a member of the House of Councillors of Japan from 2013 to 2025.

== Career ==
He graduated from the University of Tokyo and from University of California, Los Angeles and has worked in various legal industries. He was elected in 2013 and 2019 representing Saitama Prefecture.

He was defeated in the 2025 House of Councillors election, placing fifth in the four-member district.
