= Miyagi 1st district =

Japan House of Representatives constituency

Miyagi 1st District
- 宮城県第1区
- Parliamentary constituency for the Japanese House of Representatives
- Numbered map of Miyagi Prefecture single-member districts (1-6)
- Prefecture: Miyagi
- Proportional District: Tohoku
- Electorate: 447,641

Current constituency
- Created: 1994
- Seats: One
- Party: LDP
- Representative: Tōru Doi

Miyagi 1st district (Japanese: 宮城県第1区, Hepburn: Miyagi-ken Daiikku) is a single-member constituency of the House of Representatives, the lower house of the National Diet of Japan. It is located on the island of Honshu, in Miyagi Prefecture. It, along with Miyagi 2nd district and parts of districts 3 and 4, cover the city of Sendai and the surrounding suburbs.

As of 2020, the district was home to 437,128 constituents.

== Areas covered ==
=== Current district ===
After rezoning in 2022, the district covers the following areas:

- Sendai
  - Aoba-ku
  - Taihaku-ku

As a result of the rezoning, the district has returned to the state it was in before 2017.

=== Areas 2017–2022 ===
From 2017 to 2022, the district covered the following areas:

- Sendai
  - Aoba-ku
  - Taihaku-ku (excluding the former town of Akiu)

As a result of the 2017 rezoning, the area of the former town of Akiu was moved into the 3rd district.

=== Areas from pre–2017 ===
From its creation in 1994 until redistricting in 2017, the district covered the following areas:

- Sendai
  - Aoba-ku
  - Taihaku-ku

== Elected representatives ==
Representative	Party	Years served	Notes
Kazuo Aichi	NFP	1996 – 2000	
Azuma Konno	DPJ	2000 – 2005	
Tōru Doi	LDP	2005 – 2009	
Kazuko Kōri	DPJ	2009 – 2012	
Tōru Doi	LDP	2012 – 2024	
Akiko Okamoto	CDP	2024 – 2026	
Tōru Doi	LDP	2026-	

== Election results ==
‡ - Also ran in the Tohoku proportional representation block

‡‡ - Ran and won a seat in the Tohoku proportional representation block

2026
Party	Candidate	Votes	%	±%
LDP	Toru Doi^{‡}	110,185	45	▲8.2
Centrist Reform	Akiko Okamoto^{‡}	78,106	31.9	▼19.8
Sanseitō	Ayako Lawrence^{‡}	31,664	12.9	
Ishin	Kōji Takahashi^{‡}	15,246	6.2	▼5.4
JCP	Ren Nakajima	9,547	3.9	
Registered electors		447,641		
Turnout		244,748	55.56	▲4.35
LDP gain from Centrist Reform				

2024
Party	Candidate	Votes	%	±%
CDP	Akiko Okamoto^{‡}	115,142	51.7	▲10.5
LDP	Toru Doi^{‡}	81,924	36.8	▼6.6
Ishin	Kōji Takahashi^{‡}	25,852	11.6	▲1.8
Registered electors		447,080		
Turnout			51.21	▼3.39
CDP gain from LDP				

2021
Party	Candidate	Votes	%	±%
LDP	Toru Doi^{‡} (incumbent) (endorsed by Komeito)	101,964	43.4	
CDP	Akiko Okamoto^{‡‡} (incumbent - Tohoku PR)	96,649	41.2	
Ishin	Sayaka Shundo^{‡}	23,033	9.8	
Independent	Yoshie Okusa	13,174	5.6	
Turnout		240,075	54.6	
LDP hold				

2017
Party	Candidate	Votes	%	±%
LDP	Toru Doi^{‡} (incumbent) (endorsed by Komeito and Party for Japanese Kokoro)	100,123	46.2	
CDP	Akiko Okamoto^{‡‡} (elected to the Tohoku PR)	78,704	36.3	
Kibō no Tō	Yuta Ito^{‡}	24,047	11.1	
Restoration	Masaki Hatekayama^{‡}	10,001	4.6	
Happiness Realization	Satoshi Yui	2,413	1.1	
Independent	Imadome Naoto	1.547	0.7	
Turnout		222,012	51.5	
LDP hold				

2014
Party	Candidate	Votes	%	±%
LDP	Toru Doi^{‡} (incumbent) (endorsed by Komeito)	93,345	46.8	
Democratic	Kazuko Kori^{‡‡} (incumbent) (won in thE Tohoku PR district)	81,113	40.7	
JCP	Hideaki Matsui	25,063	12.6	
Turnout		206,868	49.0	
LDP hold				

2012
Party	Candidate	Votes	%	±%
LDP	Toru Doi^{‡}	87,482	39.2	
Democratic	Kazuko Kori^{‡‡} (incumbent - Tohoku PR) (endorsed by the PNP)	60,916	27.3	
Your	Hiroki Hayashi^{‡‡} (endorsed by the Japan Restoration Party)	38,316	17.2	
Tomorrow	Masato Yokota^{‡}	16,557	7.4	
JCP	Tatsuya Sumino	13,454	6.0	
Social Democratic	Takashi Kuwashima^{‡}	6,547	2.9	
Turnout		229,462	55.2	
LDP gain from Democratic				

2009
Party	Candidate	Votes	%	±%
Democratic	Kazuko Kori^{‡} (incumbent - Tohoku PR)	149,980	58.5	
LDP	Toru Doi^{‡} (incumbent)	87,401	34.1	
JCP	Tatsuya Sumino	14,547	5.7	
Independent	Takuomi Yajima	2,987	1.2	
Happiness Realization	Keiichi Toda	1,344	0.5	
Turnout		260,629	64.8	
Democratic gain from LDP				

2005
Party	Candidate	Votes	%	±%
LDP	Toru Doi^{‡}	117,236	47.3	
Democratic	Kazuko Kori^{‡‡}	115,264	46.5	
JCP	Tatsuya Sumino	15,470	6.2	
Turnout		251,455	63.2	
LDP gain from Democratic				

2003
Party	Candidate	Votes	%	±%
Democratic	Azuma Konno^{‡}	106,821	50.8	
LDP	Toru Doi^{‡}	84,565	40.2	
JCP	Naoko Kanno	18,960	9.0	
Turnout		215,884	54.7	
Democratic hold				

2000
Party	Candidate	Votes	%	±%
Democratic	Azuma Konno^{‡}	88,864	42.0	
LDP	Kazuo Aichi^{‡} (incumbent)	73,839	34.9	
JCP	Ikuko Endo^{‡}	28,281	13.4	
Social Democratic	Katsuo Okita^{‡}	20,416	9.7	
Turnout				
Democratic gain from New Frontier				

1996
Party	Candidate	Votes	%	±%
New Frontier	Kazuo Aichi	77,817	40.8	
Democratic	Tomiko Okazaki^{‡}	56,537	29.7	
LDP	Kodo Asano^{‡}	28,351	14.9	
JCP	Ikuko Endo^{‡}	26,346	13.8	
Independent	Masaya Okamoto	1,535	0.8	
Turnout				
New Frontier win (new seat)				
