= Noriko Ogawa =

Noriko Ogawa may refer to:

- Noriko Ogawa (pianist) (小川典子), born 1962, classical musician
- Noriko Ogawa (singer) (小川範子), born 1973, singer and actress
- Noriko Ishigaki (born Noriko Ogawa (小川 のり子), 1974), a politician
