= Yutaka Kumagai =

Japanese politician

- 熊谷 大
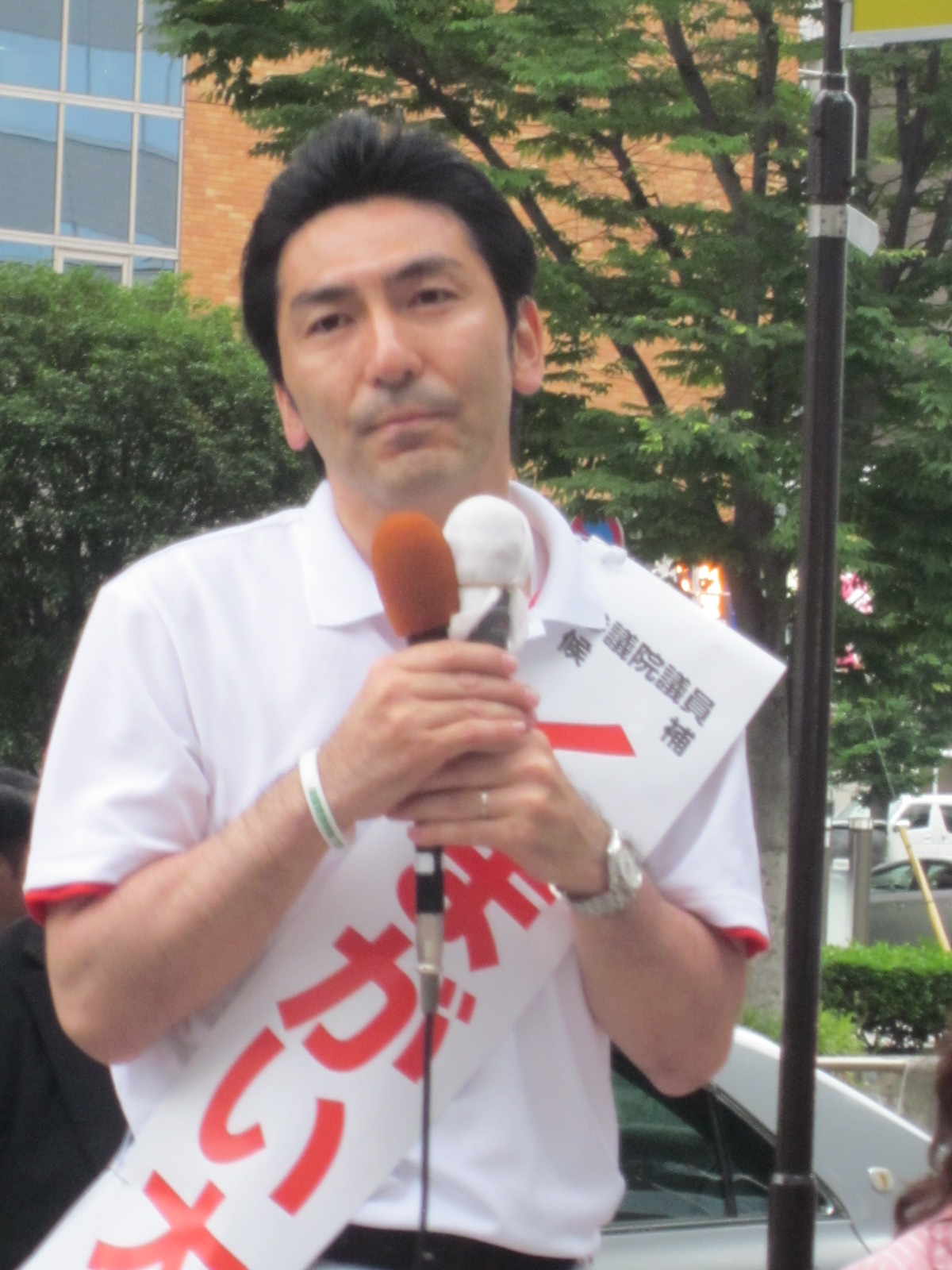
- Kumagai in 2016

Mayor of Rifu
- Incumbent
- Assumed office 2 March 2018
- Preceded by: Katsuo Suzuki

Member of the House of Councillors
- In office 26 July 2010 – 25 July 2016
- Preceded by: Ichiro Ichikawa
- Succeeded by: Mitsuru Sakurai
- Constituency: Miyagi at-large

Personal details
- Born: 16 February 1975 (age 51) Sendai, Miyagi, Japan
- Party: Liberal Democratic
- Education: Yachiyo International University; Tohoku University
- Website: Official website

Yutaka Kumagai (熊谷 大, Kumagai Yutaka; born 16 February 1975) is a Japanese politician from the Liberal Democratic Party. As of 2014 he has served as member of the House of Councillors for the Miyagi at-large district.
