= Sannō-Gakoi Site =

Sannō-Gakoi ruins
- 山王囲遺跡 (Japanese)
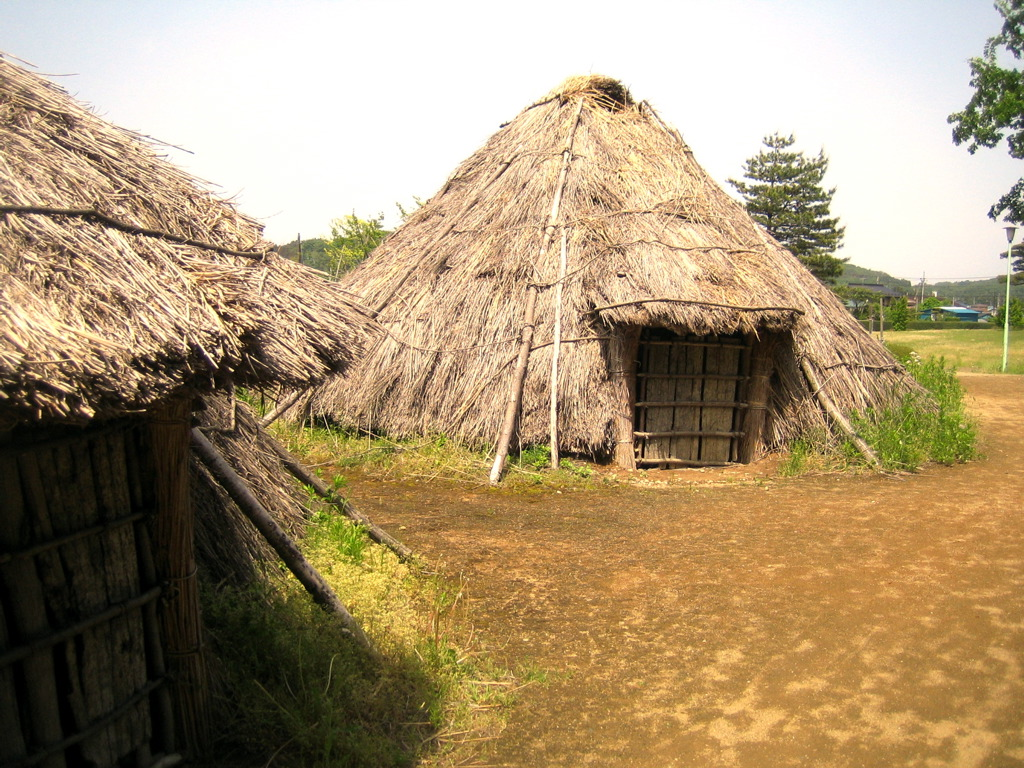
- Reconstructed Yayoi period dwelling at Sannō-Gakoi site

- Sannō-Gakoi ruins Sannō-Gakoi Site (Japan)
- 38°44′29″N 140°56′56″E
- Type: settlement
- Periods: Jōmon to Yayoi period
- Location: Kurihara, Miyagi, Japan
- Region: Tōhoku region

History
- Built: 500 BCE

Site notes
- Excavation dates: 1965, 1995-2006
- Public access: Yes (Museum, park)

The Sannō-Gakoi Site (山王囲遺跡, Sannō-Gakoi iseki) is an archaeological site located in the city of Kurihara, Miyagi Prefecture, in the Tōhoku region of northern Japan, containing the ruins of a late Jōmon period to Yayoi period (approximately 500 BC to 0 BC) settlement. The site was designated a National Historic Site in 1991 by the Japanese government.

== Overview ==
Located only a half kilometer from the center of former Sanno town, the site is on a river terrace on the north bank of the Nakasaki River, which forms a natural fortification. The site was discovered during the construction of school buildings and rescue archaeology excavations conducted in 1962 and 1964 revealed the large extent and importance of the site, leading to its National Historic Site designation in 1971. The site has multiple strata, with numerous relics excavated in each layer. The upper layers, corresponding to the Yayoi period, contained hearth traces, stone tools and tombs. However, of especial interest to archaeologists, is the lower three-meter thick peat layer in the soil has preserved fragments of knitted cloth and string from the Jōmon period, as well as examples of early lacquerware, combs, and vermilion-painted hairpins. Also uncovered in this stratum during the initial excavations in 1965 by Tohoku University were large numbers of nuts (walnuts, acorns, chestnuts) and animal bones, along with over 400 examples of pottery and more than a thousand stone tools and ornaments. These items are on display at a local history museum at the site, which also includes examples of reconstructed pit dwellings. In further investigations conducted from 1995 to 2006, the foundation Yayoi period pit dwellings and a moat surrounding the settlement were discovered.

The site is open to the public as the Sanno Historic Park Ayame Garden, with a number of restored pit-type dwellings and the Sanno Roman Museum. It is approximately 20 minutes by car from JR East Tohoku Shinkansen Kurikoma-Kōgen Station.

== See also ==
- List of Historic Sites of Japan (Miyagi)
