= Tōru Doi =

Japanese politician

- 土井 亨
- Official portrait, 2013

Member of the House of Representatives
- Incumbent
- Assumed office 9 February 2026
- Preceded by: Akiko Okamoto
- Constituency: Miyagi 1st
- In office 19 December 2012 – 9 October 2024
- Preceded by: Kazuko Kōri
- Succeeded by: Akiko Okamoto
- Constituency: Miyagi 1st
- In office 11 September 2005 – 21 July 2009
- Preceded by: Azuma Konno
- Succeeded by: Kazuko Kōri
- Constituency: Miyagi 1st

Member of the Miyagi Prefectural Assembly
- In office 1993–2003
- Constituency: Sendai City Wakabayashi Ward

Personal details
- Born: 12 August 1958 (age 68) Tomiya, Miyagi, Japan
- Party: Liberal Democratic
- Education: Tohoku Gakuin University

Tōru Doi (土井 亨, Doi Tōru; born 12 August 1958) is a Japanese politician who is serving as a member of the House of Representatives. He has served as State Minister of Reconstruction (Third Abe Cabinet (Third Reshuffle) and Fourth Abe Cabinet), State Minister of Land, Infrastructure, Transport and Tourism (Third Abe Cabinet (First Reshuffle)), Parliamentary Vice-Minister of Land, Infrastructure, Transport and Tourism (Second Abe Cabinet), Chairman of the House of Representatives Land, Infrastructure, Transport and Tourism Committee, and Chairman of the Liberal Democratic Party's Finance and Banking Committee.

== Career ==
A native of Kurokawa District, Miyagi, Doi graduated the Tohoku Gakuin University School of Law in 1981.

After having served in the local assembly of Miyagi Prefecture (won in 1993, 1995, 1999, lost in 2003), Doi was elected to the Diet for the first time in 2005.

== Positions ==
=== Revisionism ===
Affiliated to the openly revisionist lobby Nippon Kaigi, that advocates a restoration of monarchy, and State Shinto in Japan, Doi often follows their agenda:

- he was among the 86 parliamentarians attending their 7 March 2006 meeting to promote the Imperial tradition
- he was among the lawmakers who signed 'THE FACTS', an ad published in The Washington Post on 14 June 2007, in order to protest against United States House of Representatives House Resolution 121, and to deny the existence of sexual slavery for the Imperial military ('Comfort women').
- he is in favor of the revision of the Murayama Statement and Kono Statement
- he is in favor of visits by a Prime Minister to the controversial Yasukuni Shrine
- he is in favor of the revision of Article 9
- he is a member of the following right-wing Diet groups:
  - Conference of parliamentarians on the Shinto Association of Spiritual Leadership (神道政治連盟国会議員懇談会 - Shinto Seiji Renmei Kokkai Giin Kondankai) - NB: SAS a.k.a. Sinseiren, Shinto Political League
  - Nippon Kaigi Diet discussion group (日本会議国会議員懇談会 - Nippon kaigi kokkai giin kondankai)

=== Answers to Mainichi polls ===
Doi gave the following answers to the questionnaires submitted by Mainichi to candidates in 2012 and 2014:

==== In 2012 ====
His answers were:

- in favor of the revision of the Constitution
- in favor of the right of collective self-defense (revision of Article 9)
- in favor of the reform of the National assembly (unicameral instead of bicameral)
- no answer regarding the reactivation of nuclear power plants
- against the goal of zero nuclear power by 2030s
- in favor of the relocation of Marine Corps Air Station Futenma (Okinawa)
- in favor of evaluating the purchase of Senkaku Islands by the Government
- in favor of a strong attitude versus China
- against the participation of Japan to the Trans-Pacific Partnership
- against a nuclear-armed Japan
- in favor of the reform of the Imperial Household that would allow women to retain their Imperial status even after marriage

==== In 2014 ====
His answers were:

- in favor of the revision of the Article 9 of the Japanese Constitution
- in favor of the right of collective self-defense
- no answer regarding nuclear plants
- no problem for visits of a Prime Minister to the controversial Yasukuni Shrine
- in favor of the revision of the Murayama Statement
- in favor of the revision of the Kono Statement
- no answer regarding laws preventing hate speech
- no answer regarding question whether Marine Corps Air Station Futenma is a burden for Okinawa
- in favor of the Special Secrecy Law
- in favor of teaching 'morality' in school
