= Umehara =

Umehara (Japanese: 梅原) is a Japanese surname. Notable people with the surname include:

- Daigo Umehara (born 1981), Japanese arcade fighting video game player
- Katsuhiko Umehara (born 1954), mayor of Sendai
- Umehara Keiichi (梅原 圭一), the Japanese name of South Korean president Choi Kyu-hah (1919–2006)
- Reina Umehara (梅原 玲奈; born 1983), Japanese freestyle skier
- Ryūzaburō Umehara (1888–1986), Japanese painter
- Takeshi Umehara (born 1925), Japanese philosopher and writer
- Yūichirō Umehara (梅原 裕一郎; born 1991), Japanese voice actor
