= Miyagi at-large district =

Japan House of Councillors constituency

- 宮城県選挙区
- Parliamentary constituency for the House of Councillors
- Prefecture: Miyagi
- Electorate: 1,913,773 (as of September 2022)

Current constituency
- Created: 1947
- Seats: 2
- Councillors: Class of 2028: Mitsuru Sakurai (LDP); Class of 2031: Noriko Ishigaki (CDP)

The Miyagi at-large district (Japanese: 宮城県選挙区, Hepburn: Miyagi-ken senkyoku) is a multi-member constituency that represents Miyagi Prefecture in the House of Councillors in the Diet of Japan. It currently has two Councillors in the 248-member house.

== Outline ==
The constituency represents the entire population of Miyagi Prefecture including the urban centre of Sendai. From the first House of Councillors election in 1947 until the 1992 election, Miyagi elected two Councillors to six-year terms, one at alternating elections held every three years. Under 1994 electoral reform Miyagi's representation was increased to four (two sets of two) from the 1995 election.

The district had 1,907,518 registered voters as of September 2015, the second-lowest of the 10 prefectures that were represented by four Councillors at that time. By comparison, the Hokkaido, Hyogo at-large district and Fukuoka districts each had more than 4 million voters but were limited to the same number of Councillors as Miyagi. To address this malapportionment in representation, a 2015 revision of the Public Officers Election Law decreased the representation of Miyagi, Niigata and Nagano districts to two Councillors while increasing Hyogo, Hokkaido and Fukuoka districts to six Councillors; this change began to take effect at the 2016 election, at which time Miyagi elected only one Councillor, and was completed at the 2019 election when again, Miyagi only elected one Councillor. The district has been somewhat favorable to the opposition for the majority of its existence; it was briefly represented by two opposition members from 2019 to 2020, before Sakurai switched to the LDP. The CDP also defeated an incumbent LDP Councilor, Jiro Aichi, here in 2019.

The Councillors currently representing Miyagi are:

- Mitsuru Sakurai (Liberal Democratic Party, fifth term; term ends in 2028) (Note: Joined the Democratic Party for the People on 7 May 2018 along with a number of other members of the Democratic Party) (Note: Sakurai again changed parties after the DPP joined an opposition parliamentary group with several other parties including the CDP. This time he joined the ruling Liberal Democratic Party)
- Noriko Ishigaki (Constitutional Democratic Party of Japan (CDP), second term; term ends in 2031)

== Elected Councillors ==
Class of 1947		Election year	Class of 1950	
#1 (1947: 6-year term)	#2 (established 1995)	Election year	#1 (1947: 3-year term)	#2 (established 1998)
Takeo Sai (Social Democratic)	–	1947	Kei Takahashi (Democratic)	–
Takeo Sai (Social Democratic)	–	1950	Shintaro Takahashi (Liberal)	–
Shinji Yoshino (Liberal)	–	1953	Shintaro Takahashi (Liberal)	–
Shinji Yoshino (Liberal)	–	1956	Shintaro Takahashi (LDP) (Note: Resigned 3 March 1965)	–
Hisayoshi Muramatsu (LDP)	–	1959	Shintaro Takahashi (LDP)	–
Hisayoshi Muramatsu (LDP)	–	1962	Shintaro Takahashi (LDP)	–
Hisayoshi Muramatsu (LDP)	–	(Note: Held 11 April 1965)1965 by-election	Bungoro Takahashi (LDP)	–
Kikuo Toda (Social Democratic)	–	1965	Bungoro Takahashi (LDP)	–
Kikuo Toda (Social Democratic)	–	1968	Bungoro Takahashi (LDP)	–
Kikuo Toda (Social Democratic)	–	1971	Bungoro Takahashi (LDP)	–
Kikuo Toda (Social Democratic)	–	1974	Kaname Endo (LDP)	–
Buichi Oishi (LDP)	–	1977	Kaname Endo (LDP)	–
Buichi Oishi (LDP)	–	1980	Kaname Endo (LDP)	–
Choji Hoshi (LDP)	–	1983	Kaname Endo (LDP)	–
Choji Hoshi (LDP)	–	1986	Kaname Endo (LDP)	–
Kazuo Kurimura (Social Democratic) (Note: Died in office 25 January 1992)	–	1989	Kaname Endo (LDP)	–
Koki Hagino (Rengō no Kai)	–	1992 by-election (Note: Held 8 March 1992)	Kaname Endo (LDP)	–
Koki Hagino (Rengō no Kai)	–	1992	Kaname Endo (LDP)	–
Ichiro Ichikawa (Ind.) (Note: Resigned 9 October 1997)	Hiroaki Kameya (LDP)	1995	Kaname Endo (LDP)	–
Tomiko Okazaki (DPJ)	Hiroaki Kameya (LDP)	1997 by-election (Note: Held 16 November 1997)	Kaname Endo (LDP)	–
Tomiko Okazaki (DPJ)	Hiroaki Kameya (LDP)	1998	Mitsuru Sakurai (DPJ)	Ichiro Ichikawa (Ind.)
Tomiko Okazaki (DPJ)	Jiro Aichi (Ind.)	2001	Mitsuru Sakurai (DPJ)	Ichiro Ichikawa (Ind.)
Tomiko Okazaki (DPJ)	Jiro Aichi (Ind.)	2004	Ichiro Ichikawa (LDP)	Mitsuru Sakurai (DPJ)
Tomiko Okazaki (DPJ)	Jiro Aichi (LDP)	2007	Ichiro Ichikawa (LDP)	Mitsuru Sakurai (DPJ)
Tomiko Okazaki (DPJ)	Jiro Aichi (LDP)	2010	Yutaka Kumagai (LDP)	Mitsuru Sakurai (DPJ)
Jiro Aichi (LDP)	Masamune Wada (Your Party)	2013	Yutaka Kumagai (LDP)	Mitsuru Sakurai (DPJ)
Jiro Aichi (LDP)	Masamune Wada (Your Party)	2016	Mitsuru Sakurai (DPJ)	–
Noriko Ishigaki (CDP)	–	2019	Mitsuru Sakurai (DPJ)	–
Noriko Ishigaki (CDP)	–	2022	Mitsuru Sakurai (LDP)	–
Noriko Ishigaki (CDP)	–	2025	Mitsuru Sakurai (LDP)	–

== Election results ==
=== Elections in the 2020s ===
2025: Miyaki at-large 1 seat
Party	Candidate	Votes	%	±%
CDP	Noriko Ishigaki	367,794	36.20	▲6.4
LDP (Komeito)	Mitsujirō Ishikawa	292,754	28.89	▼23.01
Sanseitō	Ayako Lawrence	181,234	17.88	▲12.08
Reiwa	Yoshihito Ishii	86,963	8.58	new
Team Mirai	Nasuka Sumino	56,115	5.54	new
Independent	Takashi Nakamura	17,368	1.71	new
Anti-NHK	Taichi Maeda	12,148	1.20	▼1.1
Turnout			55.37	▲6.57
Registered electors		1,898,739		▼22,747
Party total seats		Won	Total	Change
Constitutional Democratic		1	1	Steady
Liberal Democratic		0	1	Steady

2022
Party	Candidate	Votes	%	±%
LDP	Mitsuru Sakurai (Incumbent) (Endorsed by Komeito)	472,963	51.9	▲4.9
CDP	Kimiko Obata	271,455	29.8	New
Ishin	Midori Hirai	91,924	10.1	
Sanseitō	Lawrence Ayako	52,938	5.8	
Anti-NHK	Yuya Nakae	21,286	2.3	
Registered electors		1,921,486		
Majority		201,508	22.1	New
Turnout		937,685	48.8	▼3.6
LDP gain from Democratic		Swing		

=== Elections in the 2010s ===
2019
Party	Candidate	Votes	%	±%
CDP	Noriko Ishigaki (Endorsed by the JCP's Miyagi Prefectural Committee, the SDP and the DPP)	474,692	48.6	New
LDP	Jiro Aichi (Incumbent) (Endorsed by Komeito)	465,194	47.7	▲3.0
Anti-NHK	Noriaki Miyake	36,721	3.7	New
Registered electors		1,942,518		
Majority		9,498	0.9	
Turnout		993,986	51.2	
CDP gain from LDP		Swing		
Your loss (seat eliminated)				

2016
Party	Candidate	Votes	%	±%
Democratic	Mitsuru Sakurai (Incumbent) (Endorsed by Communist, Social Democratic, and People's Life parties)	510,450	51.1	New
LDP	Yutaka Kumagai (Incumbent) (Endorsed by Komeito, Party for Japanese Kokoro)	469,268	47.0	▲20.2
Happiness Realization	Tetsushi Yui	19,129	1.9	New
Registered electors		1,947,737		
Majority		41,182	4.1	New
Turnout		1,020,419	52.4	▼0.9
Democratic gain from LDP		Swing		
Democratic loss (seat eliminated)				

2013
Party	Candidate	Votes	%	±%
LDP	Jiro Aichi (Incumbent) (Endorsed by Komeito)	421,634	44.7	▲10.2
Your	Masamune Wada	220,207	23.4	New
Democratic	Tomiko Okazaki (Incumbent)	215,105	22.8	▼29.9
JCP	Ayako Iwabuchi	76,515	8.1	▲1.2
Happiness Realization	Noriko Saikachi	9,662	1.0	New
Registered electors		1,906,260		
Turnout			50.8	▼5.0
LDP gain from Democratic		Swing		
Your gain from LDP		Swing		

2010
Party	Candidate	Votes	%	±%
LDP	Yutaka Kumagai	265,343	26.8	▼11.6
Democratic	Mitsuru Sakurai (Incumbent)	241,460	24.4	▼13.4
Democratic	Hiromi Ito	162,771	16.5	New
Independent	Ichiro Ichikawa (Incumbent)	109,137	11.0	New
Your	Fumihiro Kikuchi	106,563	10.8	New
Social Democratic	Tetsuo Kanno	51,463	5.2	▼0.2
JCP	Mikio Kato	44,973	4.5	▼5.3
Happiness Realization	Yoshiaki Murakami	7,319	0.7	New
Registered electors		1,908,319		
Turnout		1,017,897	53.3	▼0.6
LDP hold		Swing	▼5.8	
Democratic hold		Swing	▼6.7	

=== Elections in the 2000s ===
2007
Party	Candidate	Votes	%	±%
Democratic	Tomiko Okazaki (Incumbent)	549,183	52.7	▲20.5
LDP	Jiro Aichi (Incumbent)	359,099	34.5	▲7.0
JCP	Mikio Kato	71,689	6.9	▲1.0
Social Democratic	Kiyomi Kishida	61,349	5.9	▼0.2
Registered electors		1,908,286		
Turnout		1,064,632	55.8	▲0.2
Democratic hold		Swing	▲17.6	
LDP gain from Independent		Swing	▲11.1	

2004
Party	Candidate	Votes	%	±%
LDP	Ichiro Ichikawa (Incumbent)	379,342	38.4	▲15.2
Democratic	Mitsuru Sakurai (Incumbent)	372,817	37.8	▲14.6
JCP	Ikuko Endo	96,862	9.8	▼0.8
Independent	Toshiaki Sugawara	84,578	8.6	New
Social Democratic	Katsuo Okita	53,191	5.4	▼1.7
Registered electors		1,889,603		
Turnout		1,018,873	53.9	▼0.4
LDP gain from Democratic		Swing	▲15.5	
Democratic gain from Independent		Swing	▲17.1	

2001
Party	Candidate	Votes	%	±%
Democratic	Tomiko Okazaki (Incumbent)	320,417	32.2	▼19.6
Independent	Jiro Aichi	272,874	27.5	New
LDP	Hiroaki Kametani (Incumbent)	132,070	14.0	▼15.7
Social Democratic	Masatoshi Yoshida	60,693	6.1	New
JCP				
Liberal League	Kiyoharu Sato	23,308	2.3	New
Registered electors		1,864,852		
Turnout		1,035,925	55.6	▲14.5
Democratic gain from Independent		Swing	▼9.8	
Independent gain from LDP		Swing	N/A	

=== Elections in the 1990s ===
1998
Party	Candidate	Votes	%	±%
Democratic	Mitsuru Sakurai	245,273	26.0	New
Independent	Ichiro Ichikawa	218,478	23.2	New
LDP	Kaname Endo (Incumbent)	132,070	14.0	▼34.5
Independent	Sayuri Kamada	106,070	11.3	New
JCP	Michiko Sato	100,214	10.6	▲2.0
Social Democratic	Yoshihiro Sato	66,810	7.1	New
Independent	Yukio Nakazawa	32,477	3.4	New
Women's Party	Kikumi Hayasaka	21,330	2.3	New
Liberal League	Akemi Ishikawa	20,413	2.2	New
Registered electors		1,813,134		
Turnout		983,988	54.3	Unknown
Democratic gain from LDP		Swing		
Independent win (new seat)				

1997 By-Election
Party	Candidate	Votes	%	±%
Democratic	Tomiko Okazaki	283,255	51.8	New
Meeting to create the Miyagi of Tomorrow	Kimio Doi	112,098	20.5	New
JCP	Ikuko Endo	101,106	18.5	▲11.1
Social Democratic	Yoshihiro Sato	49,902	9.1	New
Registered electors		Unknown		
Majority		171,157	31.3	New
Turnout			31.1	▼10.0
Democratic gain from LDP		Swing		

1995
Party	Candidate	Votes	%	±%
Independent	Ichiro Ichikawa	238,416	34.2	New
LDP	Hiroaki Kametani	206,987	29.7	▲5.4
Democratic Reform	Hiroki Hagano	176,879	25.4	New
JCP				
New Era Party	Yuriko Ishigoka	23,792	3.4	New
Registered electors		1,756,073		
Turnout		721,043	41.1	▼20.1
Independent gain from Minkairen		Swing		
LDP win (new seat)				

1992
Party	Candidate	Votes	%	±%
LDP	Kaname Endo (Incumbent)	380,249	48.5	▼2.8
Democratic Reform	Katsue Seto (Endorsed by the JSP, DSP and the SDF)	294,599	37.6	New
JCP			8.6	▼8.2
Independent	Takao Hashimoto	41,990	5.4	New
Registered electors		Unknown		
Majority		85,650	10.9	▼25.8
Turnout		Unknown	Unknown	Unknown
LDP hold		Swing	▼12.2	

1992 By-Election
Party	Candidate	Votes	%	±%
Democratic Reform (Endorsed by the JSP, DSP and the SDF)	Katsue Seto	294,599	46.2	New
LDP	Nobuo Onodera	393,615	45.9	▲21.6
JCP	Naofumi Tsujihata	67,378	7.9	▲2.5
Registered electors		Unknown		
Majority		3,117	0.3	New
Turnout		Unknown	52.4	▼8.8
Minkairen gain from Socialist		Swing	N/A	

=== Elections in the 1980s ===
1989
Party	Candidate	Votes	%	±%
Socialist	Kazuo Kurimura	460,369	48.2	▲13.2
LDP	Nagaharu Hoshi (Incumbent)	232,253	24.3	▼24.2
Independent	Masashi Nakano	137,827	14.4	New
Democratic Socialist	Norinori Fujiwara	53,555	5.6	New
JCP	Mitsuyuki Masaki	51,778	5.4	▼11.1
Green Party	Norio Hirano	10,784	1.1	New
Taikosha Political Federation	Yoshio Chiba	9,000	0.9	New
Registered electors		1,611,384		
Majority		228,116	13.9	New
Turnout		986,006	61.2	▲6.3
Socialist gain from LDP		Swing	▲10.8	

1986
Party	Candidate	Votes	%	±%
LDP	Kaname Endo (Incumbent)	530,547	51.3	▼4.1
Socialist	Hideo Miura	264,143	25.5	▼8.4
JCP	Ikuko Endo	174,133	16.8	▲6.1
Independent	Seiki Suzuki	65,723	6.4	New
Registered electors		1,545,439		
Majority		266,404	25.8	▲4.1
Turnout		1,107,925	71.7	▼3.5
LDP hold		Swing		

1983
Party	Candidate	Votes	%	±%
LDP	Nagaharu Hoshi	374,554	48.5	▼4.9
Socialist	Kosaku Ota	270,393	35.0	▼11.6
JCP	Naoko Oki	127,430	16.5	New
Registered electors		1,498,799		
Majority		104,161	13.5	▲6.7
Turnout		807,253	53.9	▼17.5
LDP hold		Swing		

1980
Party	Candidate	Votes	%	±%
LDP	Kaname Endo (Incumbent)	561,975	55.4	▲10.2
Socialist	Osamu Takahashi	344,387	33.9	▲4.7
JCP	Goro Shizukuishi	108,793	10.7	▼3.3
Registered electors		1,442,371		
Majority		217,588	21.5	▲5.5
Turnout		1,085,096	75.2	▲2.4
LDP hold		Swing		

=== Elections in the 1970s ===
1977
Party	Candidate	Votes	%	±%
LDP	Buichi Oishi	512,905	53.4	▲12.9
Socialist	Kikuo Toda (Incumbent)	447,368	46.6	▲2.2
Registered electors		1,379,989		
Majority		65,537	5.8	▲1.5
Turnout		984,760	71.4	▲10.5
LDP gain from Socialist		Swing		

1974
Party	Candidate	Votes	%	±%
LDP	Kaname Endo	415,064	45.2	▼10.2
Socialist	Osamu Takahashi	268,113	29.2	▼6.9
JCP	Katsutoshi Honda	128,843	14.0	▲5.5
Kōmeitō	Kazuo Takeda	96,169	10.5	New
Independent	Tomio Tanno	9,631	1.1	New
Registered electors		1,304,765		
Turnout		949,347	72.8	▲3.4
Majority		146,951	16.0	▼3.3
LDP hold		Swing		

1971
Party	Candidate	Votes	%	±%
Socialist	Kikuo Toda (Incumbent)	322,058	44.8	▲6.7
LDP	Sato Tamizaburo	291,184	40.5	▲6.5
JCP	Den Abe	58,812	8.2	▲4.4
Independent	Yoshio Chiba	46,212	6.4	New
Registered electors		1,227,496		
Majority		30,874	4.3	▲1.2
Turnout		747,300	60.9	▼5.3
Socialist hold		Swing		

=== Elections in the 1960s ===
1968
Party	Candidate	Votes	%	±%
LDP	Bunguro Takahashi (Incumbent)	405,652	55.4	▼1.7
Socialist	Katsuro Haga	263,884	36.1	▲2.5
JCP	Den Abe	62,400	8.5	▲4.8
Registered electors		1,127,773		
Majority		141,768	19.3	▼9.7
Turnout		782,900	69.4	▲0.2
LDP hold		Swing		

1965
Party	Candidate	Votes	%	±%
Socialist	Kikuo Toda	253,652	38.1	▲4.3
LDP	Hiro Furuchi	233,050	35.0	▼28.6
Independent	Hisayoshi Muramatsu (Incumbent)	154,058	23.1	New
JCP	Den Abe	25,445	3.8	▲1.2
Registered electors		1,049,109		
Majority		20,602	3.1	New
Turnout		694,825	66.2	▲9.2
Socialist gain from LDP		Swing		

1965 By-Election
Party	Candidate	Votes	%	±%
LDP	Bungoro Takahashi	256,658	57.1	▼5.5
Socialist	Kikuo Toda	143,145	31.9	New
Democratic Socialist	Kinjiro Hikiji	33,367	7.4	New
JCP	Den Abe	16,140	3.6	New
Registered electors		Unknown		
Majority		113,513	25.2	▼3.8
Turnout			43.2	▼16.0
LDP hold		Swing		

=== Elections in the 1950s ===
1959
Party	Candidate	Votes	%	±%
LDP	Hisayoshi Muramatsu	342,720	63.6	New
Socialist	Zenzo Akai	182,064	33.8	New
JCP	Den Abe	13,835	2.6	New
Registered electors		989,567		
Majority		160,656	29.8	New
Turnout		564,053	57.0	▼3.7
LDP gain from Liberal		Swing		

1956
Party	Candidate	Votes	%	±%
LDP	Shintaro Takahashi	336,366	57.9	New
Socialist	Fujio Takahashi	244,215	42.1	New
Registered electors		938,724		
Majority		92,151	15.8	New
Turnout		611,109	65.1	▼7.6
LDP gain from Liberal		Swing		

1953
Party	Candidate	Votes	%	±%
Liberal	Shinji Yoshino	194,909	38.8	New
Left Socialist	Fujio Takahashi	140,547	28.0	New
Kaishintō	Seijiro Takahashi	112,137	22.3	New
Independent	Seino Gakudo	55,174	11.0	New
Registered electors		883,149		
Majority		54,362	10.8	New
Turnout		536,159	60.7	▲1.4
Liberal gain from Socialist		Swing		

1950
Party	Candidate	Votes	%	±%
Liberal	Shintaro Takahashi	295,887	54.0	New
Democratic Party for the People	Kei Takahashi (Incumbent)	121,478	22.2	New
Socialist	Tatsujiro Yonekura	101,593	18.5	▼11.4
JCP	Kanroku Saijo	29,116	5.3	New
Registered electors		816,456		
Majority		174,409	31.8	New
Turnout		593,890	72.7	▲13.4
Liberal gain from Democratic		Swing		

=== Elections in the 1940s ===
1947
Party	Candidate	Votes	%	±%
Socialist	Takeo Sai	122,668	29.9	New
Democratic	Kei Takahashi	103,984	25.4	New
Liberal	Chushichi Shoji	91,604	22.4	New
Liberal	Atanobu Tairano	91,564	22.3	New
Registered electors		778,836		
Turnout		461,850	59.3	New
Socialist win (new seat)				
Democratic win (new seat)				

== See also ==
- List of districts of the House of Councillors of Japan
