= Tomiko Okazaki =

Japanese politician

- 岡崎 トミ子
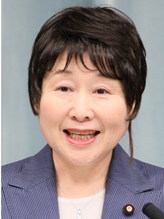
- Okazaki in 2010

Chairwoman of the National Public Safety Commission
- In office 17 September 2010 – 14 January 2011
- Prime Minister: Naoto Kan
- Preceded by: Hiroshi Nakai
- Succeeded by: Kansei Nakano

Member of the House of Councillors
- In office 19 November 1997 – 28 July 2013
- Preceded by: Ichiro Ichikawa
- Succeeded by: Masamune Wada
- Constituency: Miyagi at-large

Member of the House of Representatives
- In office 18 February 1990 – 27 September 1996
- Preceded by: Kazuo Takeda
- Succeeded by: Constituency abolished
- Constituency: Miyagi 1st

Personal details
- Born: 16 February 1944 Fukushima City, Fukushima, Japan
- Died: 19 March 2017 (aged 73) Sendai, Miyagi, Japan
- Party: Democratic (1998–2016)
- Other political affiliations: Socialist (1990–1996); Social Democratic (1996); Democratic (1996–1998)

Tomiko Okazaki (岡崎 トミ子, Okazaki Tomiko; 16 February 1944 – 19 March 2017) was a Japanese politician of the Democratic Party of Japan, a member of the House of Councillors in the Diet (national legislature).

== Early life ==
Okazaki was a native of Fukushima, Fukushima and high school graduate. Before her political career she worked at TV and radio stations.

== Political career ==
In 1990, she was elected to the House of Representatives for the first time as a member of the Japan Socialist Party. She lost her seat in 1996 but was elected to the House of Councillors for the first time in 1997.

She was the 87th Chairperson of the National Public Safety Commission.

Political offices
Preceded by Hiroshi Nakai	Chairman of the National Public Safety Commission; 2010–2011	Succeeded by Kansei Nakano
Preceded by Satoshi Arai	Minister of State for Consumer Affairs and Food Safety; 2010–2011	Succeeded by Renhō (Murata)
Preceded by Kōichirō Genba	Minister of State for Social Affairs and Gender Equality; 2010–2011	Succeeded by Kaoru Yosano
Preceded by Kōichirō Genba	Minister of State for Combatting the Declining Birthrate; 2010–2011	Succeeded by Kaoru Yosano
House of Representatives (Japan)
Preceded by Hiroshi Mitsuzuka; Kazuo Aichi...	Representative for Miyagi 1st district (multi-member); 1990–1996; Served alongside: Kazuo Aichi, Hiroshi Mitsuzuka, Kunio Chiba, Sōichirō Itō, ...	District eliminated
House of Councillors
Preceded by Ichirō Ichikawa	Councillor for Miyagi; 1997–present Served alongside: Hiroaki Kameya, Jirō Aichi	Incumbent
