= Irinosawa Site =

Archaeological site in Japan

Irinosawa ruins
- 入の沢遺跡 (Japanese)
- Irinosawa ruins Irinosawa Site (Japan)
- 38°45′33″N 141°02′00″E
- Periods: Kofun period
- Location: Kurihara, Miyagi, Japan
- Region: Tōhoku region

Site notes
- Area: 47,000 m^{2} (510,000 sq ft)
- Public access: Yes (no facilities)

Irinosawa site (入の沢遺跡, Irinosawa iseki) is an archaeological site with the ruins of a late 4th century AD Kofun period settlement located in what is now the city of Kurihara, Miyagi Prefecture in the Tōhoku region of northern Japan. The site received protection by the central government as a National Historic Site in 2017.

== Overview ==
The Irinosawa site is located at an altitude of 49 meters on the southernmost side of a hill sandwiched by the Sakogawa and Nisakogawa rivers, and extends 430 meters north to south and 450 meters east to west. It contains the ruins of many pit dwellings in an extremely dense configuration not found in any other known Kofun period settlement, and was surrounded by a moat. One of the pit dwellings was found to contain two bronze mirrors, 28 iron items and over 200 beads (including several jade magatama), In addition, many relics have been excavated from other pit building ruins, and two more mirrors. The density of artifacts is highly unusual, but the presence of mirrors is a major mystery, as at the time bronze mirrors were considered sacred ritual items which were in the possession of only the highest rulers and to have several in one ordinary dwelling, let alone in multiple coexisting buildings is unprecedented. Much of the pottery shards found are of a type common in the Kansai region or Japan, and many of the glass beads originated from outside the Japanese archipelago. As the pit dwellings contained no hearth or evidence of habitation, it has been speculated by archaeologists that the buildings are warehouses, possibly a trade center, or possibly an outpost of the Yamato state, which was expanding its influence into the region even during the 4th century AD. The defensive nature of the building arrangement and the fact that many of the buildings appear to have been intentionally destroyed by fire led some weight to this theory, as Yamato influence was spreading over the opposition of the local Emishi tribes.

It was excavated in 2017 in conjunction with construction work on a bypass for Japan National Route 4

== See also ==
- List of Historic Sites of Japan (Miyagi)
