= Masamune Wada =

Japanese politician

- 和田 政宗
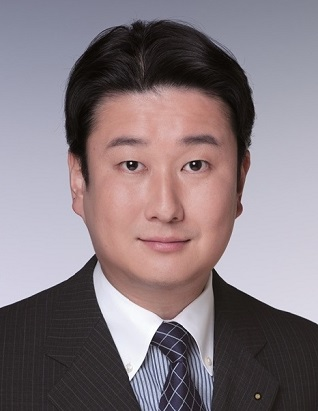
- Official portrait, 2013

Member of the House of Representatives
- Incumbent
- Assumed office 8 February 2026
- Constituency: Tohoku PR

Member of the House of Councillors
- In office 29 July 2013 – 28 July 2025
- Preceded by: Tomiko Okazaki
- Succeeded by: Multi-member district
- Constituency: Miyagi at-large (2013–2019); National PR (2019–2025)

Personal details
- Born: 14 October 1974 (age 51) Koganei, Tokyo, Japan
- Party: Sanseitō (since 2025)
- Other political affiliations: YP (2013–2014); PJK (2014–2016); Independent (2016–2017); LDP (2017–2025)
- Education: Keio University
- Occupation: Television presenter • Politician
- Website: www.wadamasamune.net

Masamune Wada (和田 政宗, Wada Masamune; born 14 October 1974) is a Japanese politician. From 2013 to 2019, he served in the House of Councillors representing the Miyagi at-large district, and later for the proportional representation block from 2019 to 2025.

He was elected to the House in the July 2013 as a member of Your Party. Upon the party's dissolution in November 2014 he joined the Party for Future Generations. He was promoted to Secretary-General of the party in September 2015; the party changed its name to Party for Japanese Kokoro in December 2015. In November 2016 he left the party and joined the Liberal Democratic Party's parliamentary group, but did not officially join the LDP. He joined the LDP on 24 September 2017, and was elected as a candidate from the proportional district in the 25th ordinary election for the House of Councillors held in July 2019.

Wada graduated with a degree in political science from Keio University's Faculty of Law in 1997. Prior to entering politics he worked as an announcer for national broadcaster NHK from 1997 until 2013.
