= Uguisuzawa, Miyagi =

Japanese dissolved town

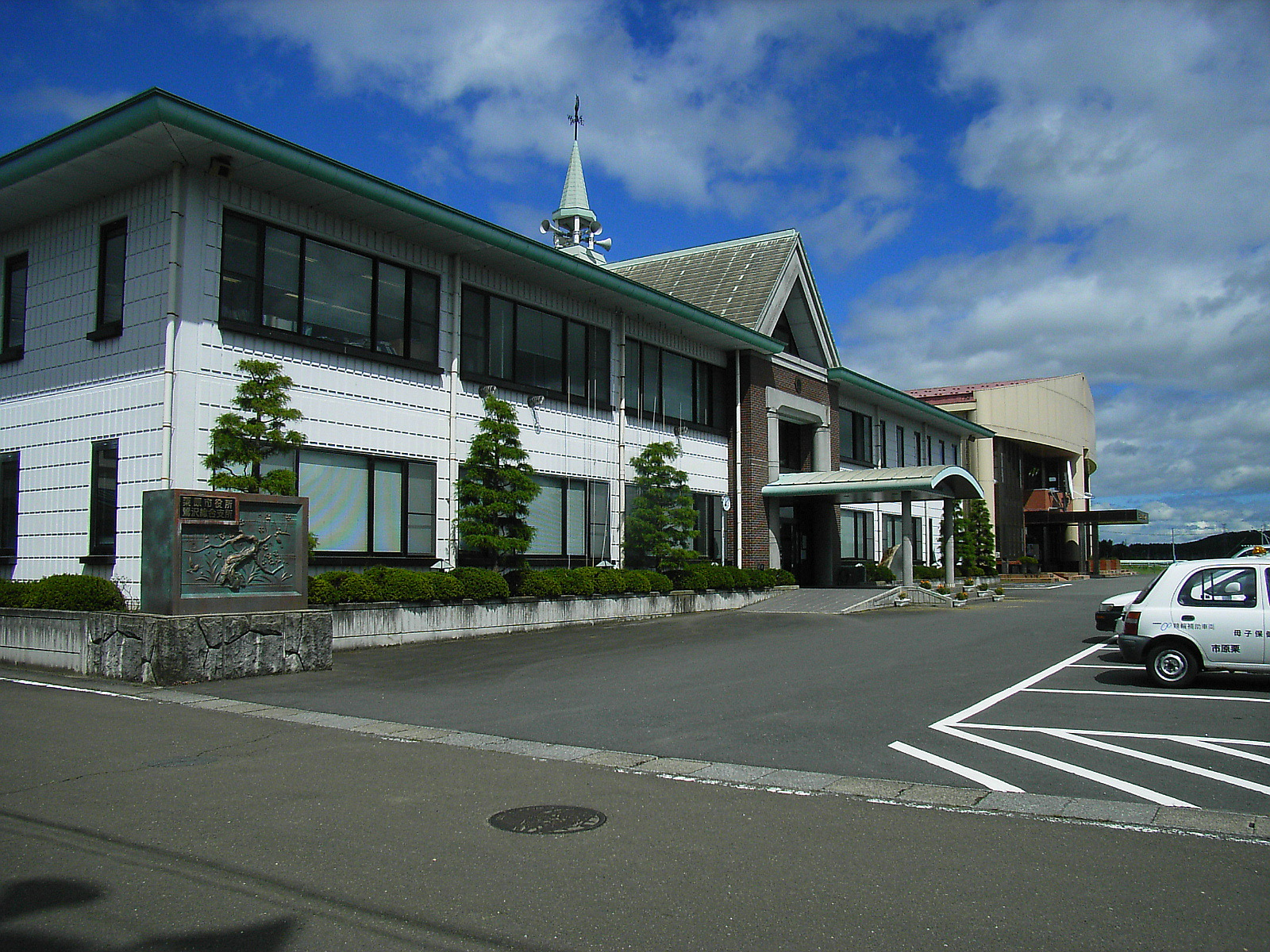
Former town office of Uguisuzawa (now Uguisuzawa Branch of the Kurihara City Office) (September 2005)

Uguisuzawa (鶯沢町, Uguisuzawa-chō) was a town located in Kurihara District, Miyagi Prefecture, Japan.

On April 1, 2005, Uguisuzawa, along with the towns of Ichihasama, Kannari, Kurikoma, Semine, Shiwahime, Takashimizu, Tsukidate and Wakayanagi, and the village of Hanayama (all from Kurihara District), were merged to create the city of Kurihara.

== Geography ==
Uguisuzawa was located on the border between the Ōu Mountains and the Sendai plain. The Nihasama River starts here and runs through the town. The Namari River, a branch of the Nihasama also runs through Uguisuzawa.

== Demographics ==
In October 1999, the town had an estimated population of 3,246.

The population as calculated in previous National Censuses was as follows.

Year	Population
1985	4,294
1990	3,625
1995	3,445

== History ==
The village of Uguisuzawa dated back to the Edo period. It gained town status on April 1, 1951, by merging with nearby Fukuro Village - Uguisuzawa comprises Fukuro, Nango, and Hosokura villages. On April 1, 2005, Uguisuzawa was dissolved as a municipality, becoming part of the city of Kurihara, Miyagi.

== Transport ==
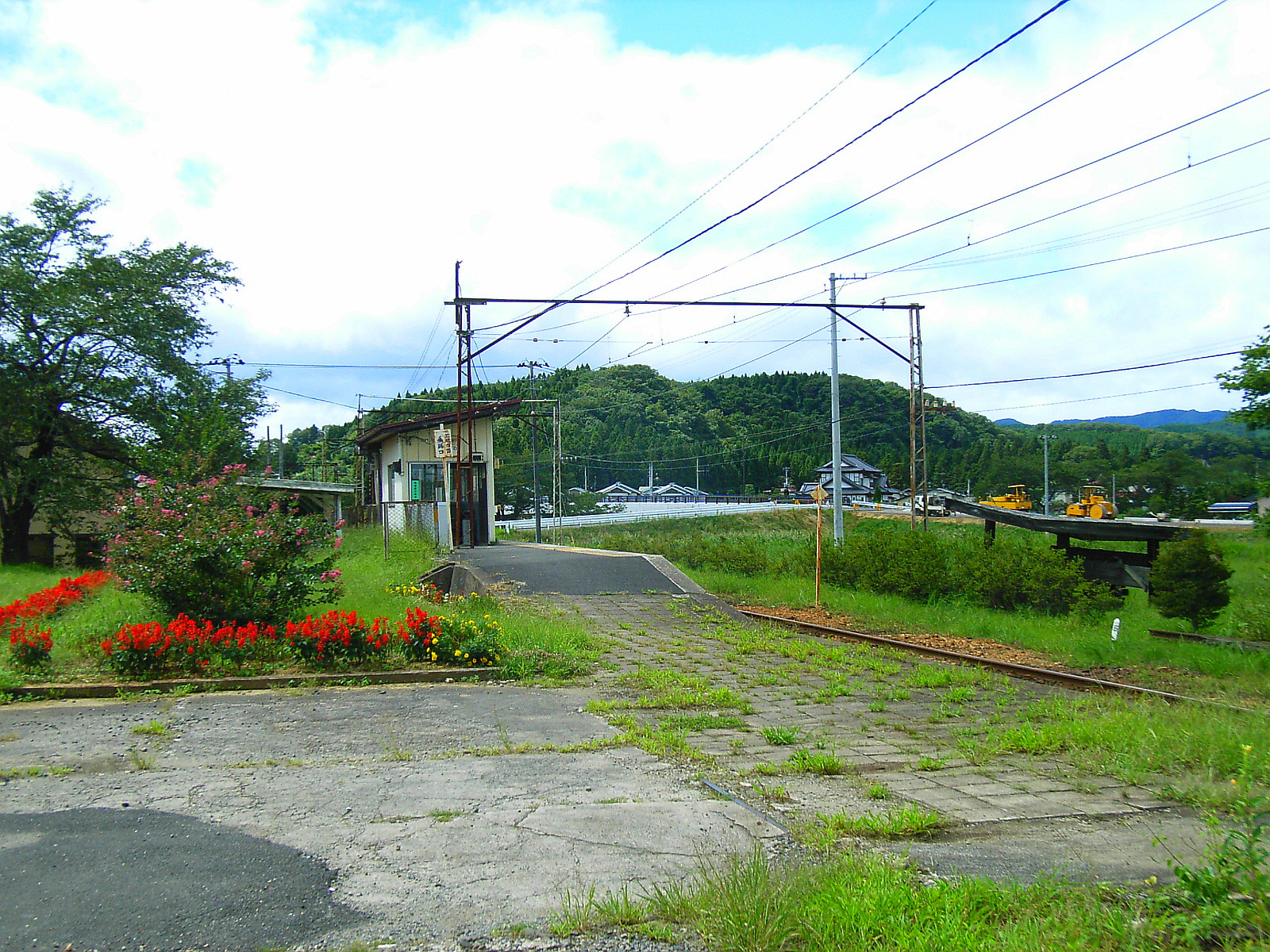
Uguisuzawa Station, September 2005

=== Rail ===
Uguisuzawa was served by the Kurihara Den'en Railway Line, which closed in March 2007 due to low ridership. Three stations on the line were located within Uguisuzawa:

- Uguisuzawa Station
- Uguisuzawa Kōgyōkōkō Mae Station
- Hosokura Mine Park Mae Station

=== Road ===
- National Route 457

== Education ==
- Miyagi Uguisuzawa Technical High School (renamed Iwagasaki Technical High School after merging with Iwagasaki High School in the nearby town of Kurikoma)
- Uguisuzawa Junior High School (closed/merged with Kurikoma Junior High School April 1, 2013)
- Uguisuzawa Elementary School

== Places of interest ==
- Hosokura Mine Park
- Film set of Tokyo Tower: Mom and Me, and Sometimes Dad filmed in Uguisuzawa's Hosokura district in 2007.

== Notable persons from Uguisuzawa ==
- Ichiro Ichikawa, politician
