= Ichiro Ichikawa =

Japanese politician (born 1937)

- 市川 一朗
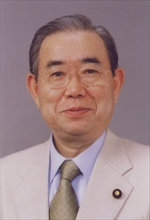
- Official portrait, 2003

Member of the House of Councillors
- In office 25 July 1998 – 25 July 2010
- Preceded by: Kaname Endō
- Succeeded by: Yutaka Kumagai
- Constituency: Miyagi at-large
- In office 23 July 1995 – 9 October 1997
- Preceded by: Kōki Hagino
- Succeeded by: Tomiko Okazaki
- Constituency: Miyagi at-large

Personal details
- Born: 12 April 1937 (age 89) Uguisuzawa, Miyagi, Japan
- Party: Liberal Democratic
- Other political affiliations: Independent (1995–1998)
- Education: University of Tokyo

Ichiro Ichikawa (市川 一朗, Ichikawa Ichirō; born April 12, 1937) is a Japanese politician of the Liberal Democratic Party, a member of the House of Councillors in the Diet (national legislature). A native of Uguisuzawa, Miyagi and graduate of the University of Tokyo, he worked at the Ministry of Construction from 1961 to 1994. He was elected for the first time in 1995.
