= Wakayanagi, Miyagi =

Dissolved municipality in Miyagi prefecture, Japan

Coordinates: 38.767°N 141.133°E

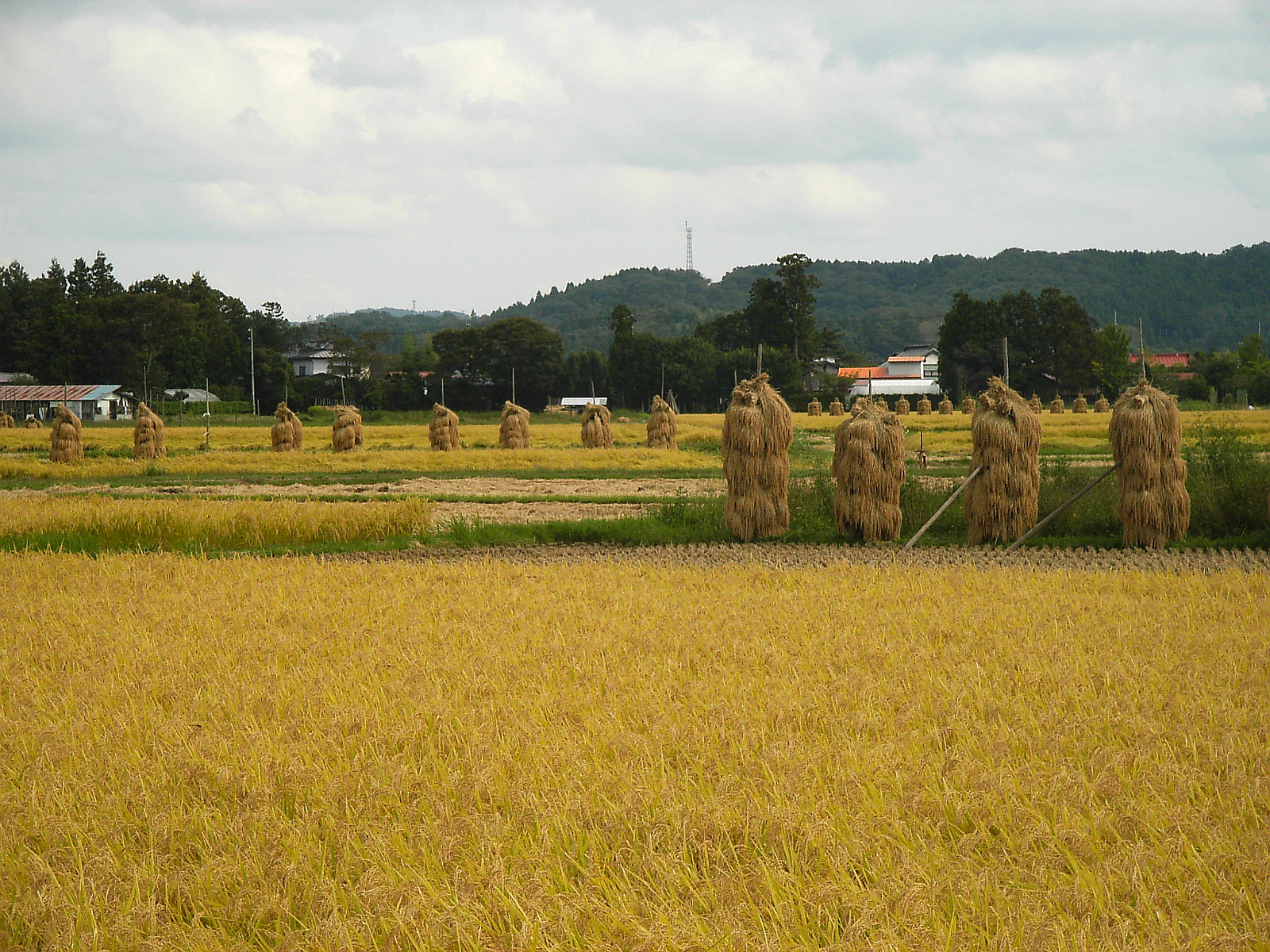
Rice paddy in autumn (September 2005)

Wakayanagi (若柳町, Wakayanagi-chō) was a town located in Kurihara District, Miyagi Prefecture, Japan.

== Population ==
In 2003, the town had an estimated population of 14,149 and a population density of 269.20 persons per km^{2}. The total area is 52.56 km^{2}.

== Geography ==
Wakayanagi is located in the north of the Miyagi prefecture and the Sendai plain. The Hasama River runs through toward the southeast. The town had developed as a crossing point of the river. Wakayanagi Station (Ishikoshi Station) of the Kurihara Denen Railway had been near the north bank until its abolishment in 2007 and the town hall was located near south of the river. The main streets between them connect at the Wakayanagi Grand Bridge (Wakayanagi Ōhashi) across the river.

== Economy ==
It has been a part of the rice cultivation zone of Miyagi prefecture, which was (and is) one of a few important rice production areas in Japan. Additionally, some middle or small industrial factories are located there.

== History ==
On April 1, 2005, Wakayanagi, along with the towns of Ichihasama, Kannari, Kurikoma, Semine, Shiwahime, Takashimizu, Tsukidate and Uguisuzawa, and the village of Hanayama (all from Kurihara District), was merged to create the city of Kurihara.
