= Nuruyu Bansho Site =

- 仙台藩花山村寒湯番所跡 (Japanese)
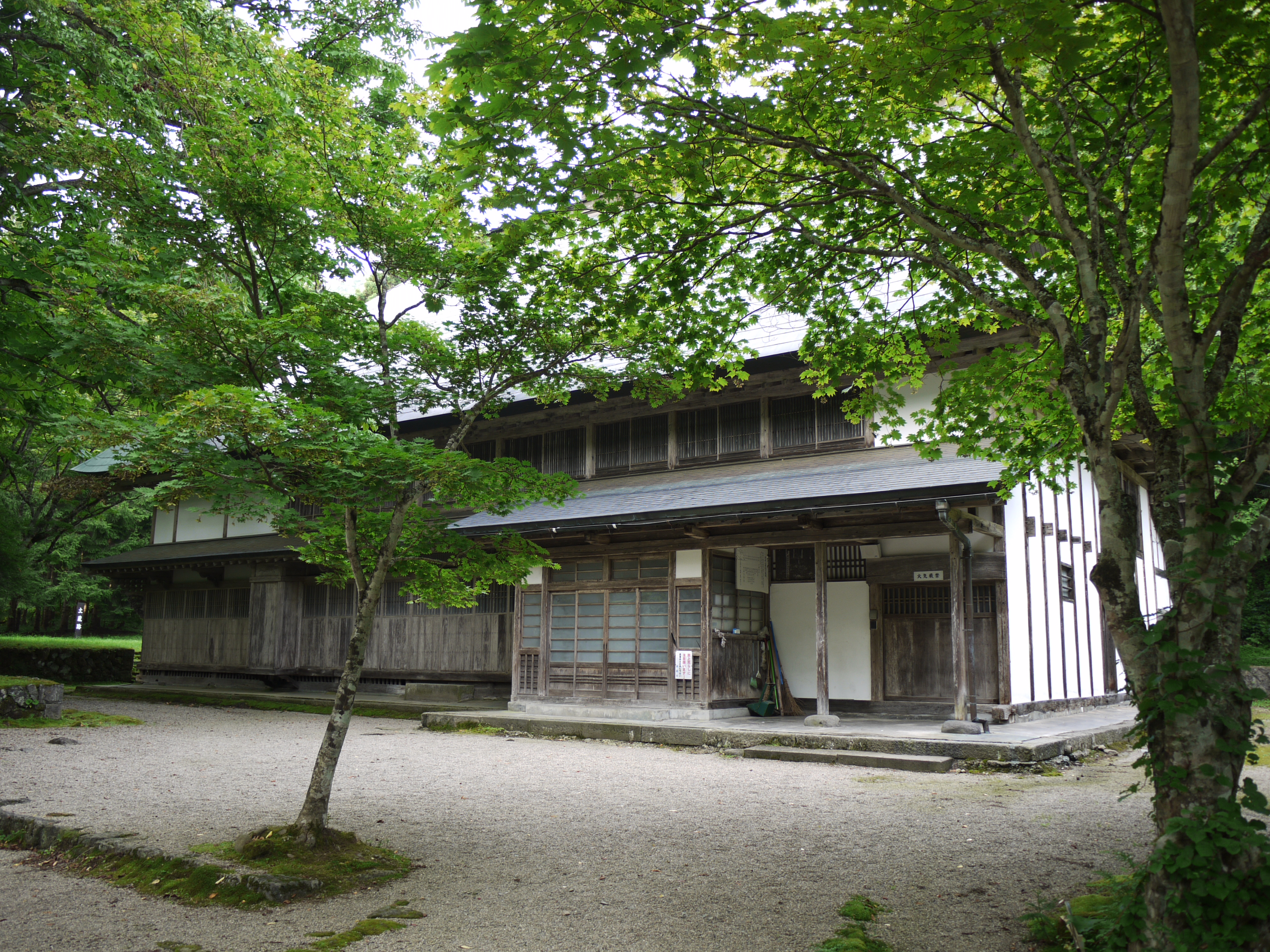

- Location in Japan Nuruyu Bansho Site (Japan)
- 38°51′43″N 140°46′42″E
- Periods: Edo period
- Location: Kurihara, Miyagi, Japan
- Region: Tōhoku region

Site notes
- Public access: Yes (Museum)

The Nuruyu Bansho Site (仙台藩花山村寒湯番所跡, Sendai-han Hanayama-mura Nuruyu-bansho ato) is the location of a former barrier gate and guard post between Sendai Domain and Kubota Domain under the Tokugawa shogunate of Edo period Japan. It is located within what is now the city of Kurihara in Miyagi Prefecture. The site has been protected by the central government as a National Historic Site since 1963.

== Overview ==
Under the Tokugawa shogunate, government installations were established at strategic locations along major traffic routes and on roads connecting major feudal domains where travellers were stopped for inspection, tolls were levied, and suspicious persons detained for interrogation. The Nuruyu Bansho was one such location, erected in 1608, to control a mountain pass in the Ōu Mountains. It was located about 27.4 km northwest of old Tsukiji town and 100 meters east of an onsen village on the border of Sendai Domain which served as a post station.

The Historic Site consists of a gate and a single official residence building. The other structures normally associated with a bansho have not been preserved, The four-pillar gate has a thatched roof and is made of zelkova wood without the use of any nails. It is decorated with the Date clan mon. Within the gate is a two-story late Edo-period government office building measuring 23.19 meters by 11.89 meters, which was built in the Ansei era (1854-1860). It contains a local history museum, which is closed during winter from December to March. The site is approximately 55 minutes by car from the Tohoku Expressway Tsukidate IC.

== See also ==
- List of Historic Sites of Japan (Miyagi)
