= Kurikoma, Miyagi =

Dissolved municipality in Miyagi prefecture, Japan

Kurikoma (栗駒町, Kurikoma-machi) was a town in Kurihara District, Miyagi Prefecture, Japan. Established in 1955 with the consolidation of six municipalities, it was abolished in a merger forming the larger Kurihara City in 2005. The municipal area was 244.36 km^{2} and the population was 13,736 in 2005.

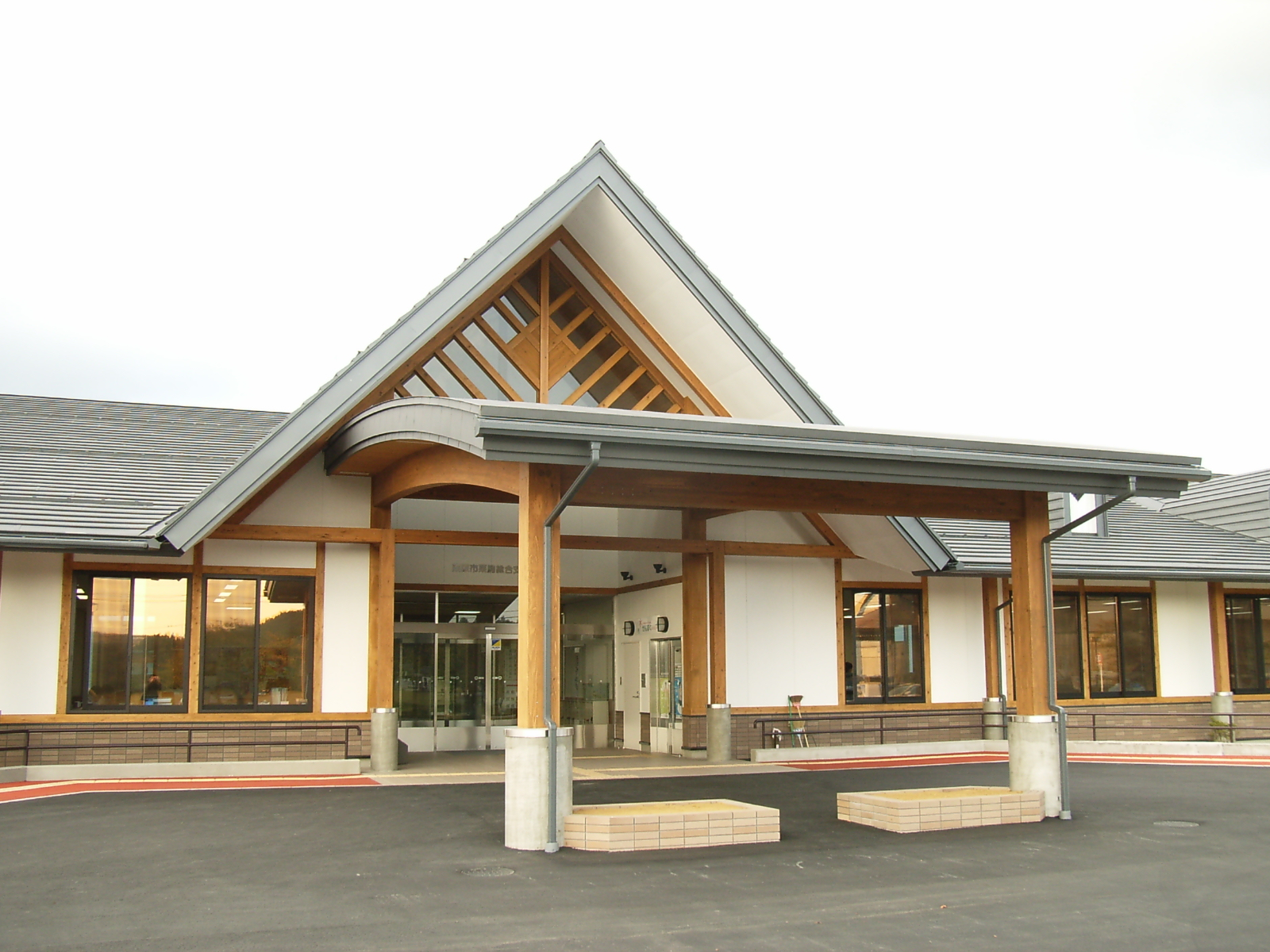
Former Town Office (October. 2005)

== Geography ==
Kurikoma was located on the northwest border of Miyagi Prefecture with Iwate Prefecture and Akita Prefecture.

Kurikoma covered a narrow east–west area. Mount Kurikoma sat at the northwest border with Iwate Prefecture. It was the origin of the name of the municipality. The largest town of the area was Iwagasaki, which was 23 kilometers east of the mountain. Later Iwagasaki was often called Kurikoma because the municipal office was built there.

The western half of the municipality covered a part of the Ōu Mountains. This area is less populated but a ski and spa resort is located southeast of Mount Kurikoma. Two rivers, Nihasama and Sanhasama, run toward the southeast from the mountain. Both make valleys of 1 - 3 kilometers width on reaching the eastern area, which are mainly cultivated as rice fields. Iwagasaki is located on the north bank of Sanhasama River. Nihasama (Second Hasama), Sanhasama (Third Hasama) and Ichihasama (First Hasama) merge to form the Hasama River east of the former Kurikoma Town.

The eastern area was more populated than the west, but flatlands are limited to the above-mentioned valleys. The rest of the eastern half, especially almost all of the northeast quarter, was occupied by low hills of less than 500 meters height.

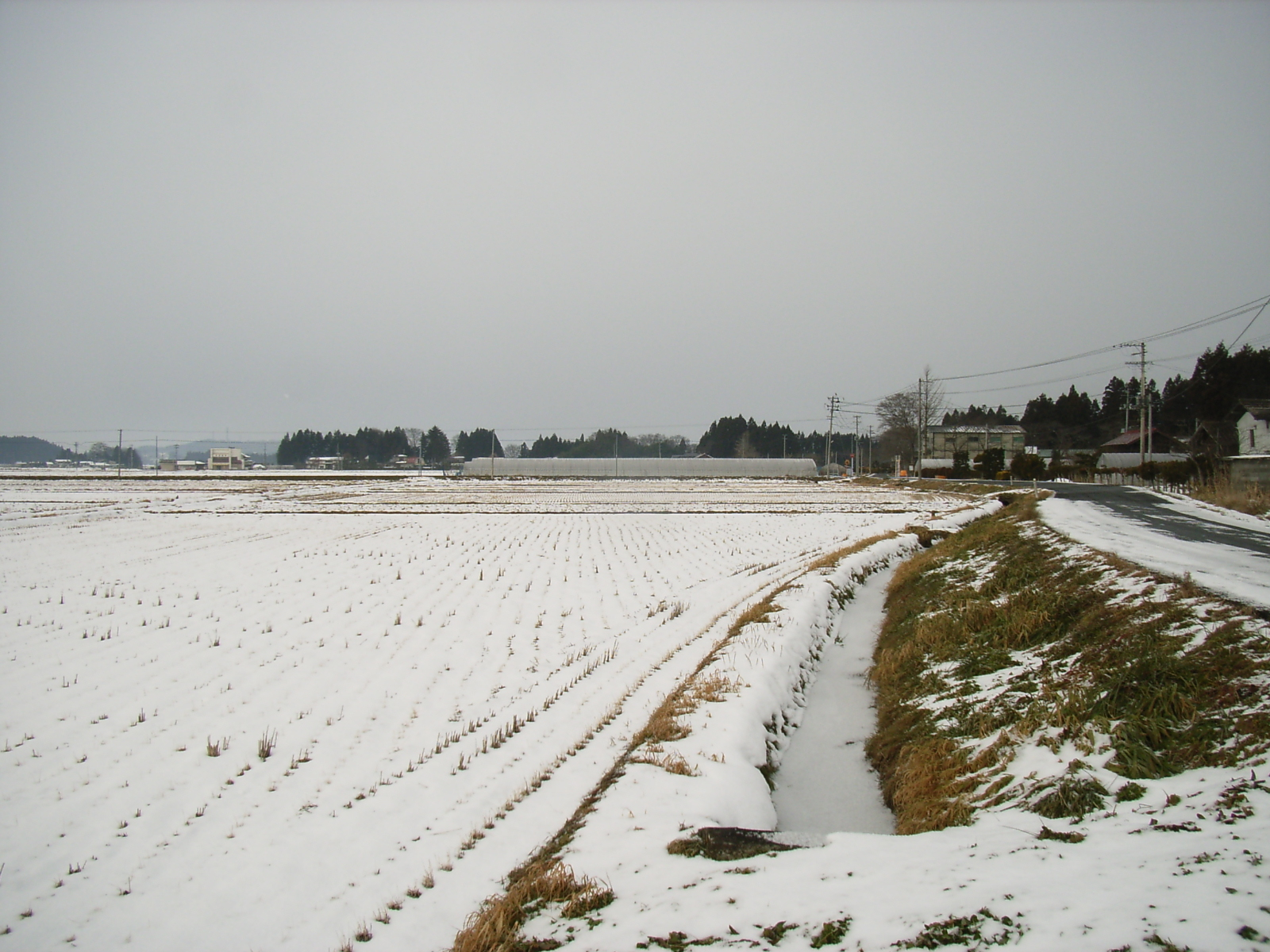
Rice Field and irrigation canal resting in winter (Dec. 2005)

== History ==
- April 1, 1955 - Kurikoma Town was established through the consolidation of Iwagasaki Town (岩ヶ崎町) and the villages of Omatsu (尾松村), Toyasaki (鳥矢崎村), Monji (文字村), Kurikoma (栗駒村) and Himematsu (姫松村).
- April 1, 2005 - Kurikoma Town was merged with the towns of Ichihasama (一迫町), Uguisuzawa (鶯沢町), Kannari (金成町), Shiwahime (志波姫町), Semine (瀬峰町), Takashimizu (高清水町), Tsukidate (築館町), Wakayanagi (若柳町) and the village of Hanayama (花山村) to form the new Kurihara City (栗原市).
