= Akiko Okamoto =

Japanese female lawyer and politician (1964-)

- 岡本 章子
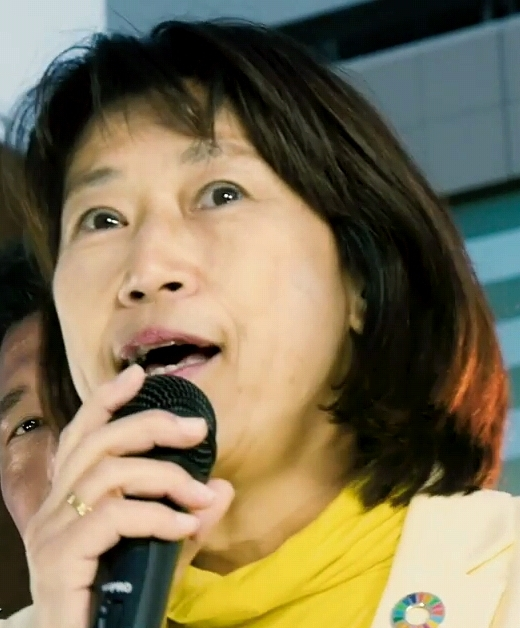
- Akiko Okamoto, giving a speech, October 20, 2019

Member of the House of Representatives
- In office October 22, 2017 – January 23, 2026
- Preceded by: Multi-member district
- Succeeded by: Tōru Doi
- Constituency: Tohoku PR (2017–2024); Miyagi 1st (2024–2026)

Member of the Sendai City Council
- In office April 1999 – October 2017
- Constituency: Taihaku Ward

Personal details
- Born: August 16, 1964 (age 62) Iwanuma, Miyagi, Japan
- Party: CRA (since 2026)
- Other political affiliations: DPJ (1999–2016); DP (2016–2017); CDP (2017–2026)
- Children: 2
- Education: Bachelor of Education, Tohoku University, 1987
- Occupation: Politician
- Website: Official Website

Akiko Okamoto (岡本章子) (married name: Yamashita (山下章子)) (born August 16, 1964) is a Japanese politician and a member of the House of Representatives (three terms) for the Constitutional Democratic Party (CDP). She has served as a member of the Sendai City Council (five terms) and as an executive officer of the Constitutional Democratic Party of Japan.

== Early life ==
She was born in Iwanuma, Miyagi Prefecture on August 2, 1964. Her birth surname is Okamoto, which is her registered politician name. Her real name is Yamashita. (Note: Sources clearly state her registered political name is Okamoto. In Japan a married couple must use the same surname; which has caused a lot of debate in recent year. The source says Yamashita is her "real name" without specifying if that is her married or maiden name.) After graduating from Mukaiyama Kindergarten in Sendai City, she moved to Aomori City, Hirosaki, and then Akita City. She graduated from the junior high school attached to the Faculty of Education and Culture, Akita University. She then entered Akita Prefectural Akita High School in 1980, but transferred to Aomori Prefectural Aomori High School the following year in 1981. In 1982, she transferred to Miyagi Prefectural Second Girls' High School, graduating from the same school in 1983. She graduated from the Faculty of Education at Tohoku University in March 1987. In April of the same year, she began working for NTT East Japan.

== Career ==
She ran as a Democratic Party candidate in the Sendai City Council election (Taihaku Ward) held on April 11, 1999, and was elected for the first time. Since then, she has been elected a total of five times in a row.

In July 2017, she became the prefectural secretary-general of the Democratic Party. The Miyagi Prefectural Chapter of the Democratic Party of Japan (DPJ) had been coordinating with Okamoto and Yuta Ito, a member of the Sendai City Council, to endorse Okamoto for the Miyagi 1st districtin the upcoming House of Representatives election. On September 23 of the same year, the chapter decided to endorse Okamoto. However, shortly thereafter, on September 28, the party decided to merge with the Party of Hope, and on October 3, the Party of Hope announced that it would endorse Ito for the Miyagi 1st district. On October 4, Okamoto stated that she "does not agree with the Party of Hope's method of selecting certain people," and announced her intention to run as a member of the Constitutional Democratic Party. As a result, the Prefectural Committee of the Japanese Communist Party withdrew its endorsement of Okamoto.

In the October 2016 House of Representatives election, Tōru Doi of the Liberal Democratic Party was elected in the Miyagi 1st district, while Okamoto was elected for the first time through proportional representation. Ito of the Party of Hope came in third and lost.

On September 19, 2020, the Miyagi Prefectural Chapter of the new Constitutional Democratic Party, formed by the merger of the former Constitutional Democratic Party and the former Democratic Party for the People, was launched. Okamoto became its representative.

In the 49th general election for the House of Representatives on October 31, 2021, Okamoto and Doi, endorsed by the Constitutional Democratic Party of Japan (CDP), Sayaka Harutoshi, endorsed by the Japan Restoration Party (JRP), and independent candidate Yoshie Okusa ran. Although Okamoto lost to Doi in the single-seat constituency, she was re-elected to a second term through proportional representation. In the leadership election following the resignation of Representative Yukio Edano (held on November 30), she was one of the supporters of Chinami Nishimura. On December 6, the CDP decided on a new personnel change, with six of its 12 executive officers being women. Okamoto was appointed acting head of the Gender Equality Promotion Headquarters, one of the executive officer positions. She retired from her executive officer position in August 2022.

On September 30, 2024 , he was appointed Minister of Reconstruction and Fukushima Revitalization in the Constitutional Democratic Party of Japan 's next Cabinet.

On October 15 of the same year, the 50th general election for the House of Representatives was announced, with three candidates running: Okamoto, Doi, and Koji Takahashi, a former Kamakura City Council member endorsed by the Japan Restoration Party. The LDP faced headwinds due to scandals involving slush funds, the Unification Church, and the revelation on October 23 of a 20 million yen payment to an unofficial candidate. The general election was held on October 27. Just after the voting closed at 8 p.m., Tohoku Broadcasting Company reported that Okamoto had been certain to win. Okamoto was elected for a third term. The LDP won five seats in the proportional representation Tohoku block. Of the three seats, excluding Eto Satoshi, who came in first, and Chisato Morishita, who came in second, Taku Nemoto was elected with the third-lowest margin of defeat (75.141%), while Doi, who came in fourth (71.150%), lost his seat.

== Political positions ==
=== Constitution ===
The results of surveys conducted by various media outlets regarding constitutional reform are as follows:

- 2017 - Responded to the Asahi Shimbun newspaper saying she was "somewhat opposed."
- 2021 - She responded to the Asahi Shimbun newspaper that she was "rather opposed."
- 2024 - NHK responded "against" the proposal.
- 2021, 2024 - Regarding the inclusion of the Self-Defense Forces in Article 9 of the Constitution, in NHK surveys in 2021 and 2024, she answered "against" the idea.
- 2021, 2024 - Regarding amending the Constitution to include an emergency clause, she responded "against" in a 2021 Mainichi Shimbun survey. She also responded "against" in a 2024 NHK survey.

=== Diplomacy/Security ===
- 2017 - In an Asahi Shimbun survey, she responded that she did not approve of the passage of the security-related legislation.
- 2021 - In a Mainichi Shimbun survey, she responded that he was “against” the possession of “enemy base attack capabilities."
- 2021 - In a Mainichi Shimbun survey, when asked what she thought about the deterioration of relations between Japan and South Korea over historical issues such as the forced labor lawsuits, she answered, "The government's current diplomatic policy is fine."

=== Gender ===
The results of surveys conducted by various media outlets regarding the introduction of a system of optional separate surnames for married couples are as follows:

- 2017 - Responded to the Asahi Shimbun in favor.
- 2021 - Responded to the Asahi Shimbun in favor.
- 2021 - In response to the question, "Should a bill to promote understanding of sexual minorities, including LGBT people, be passed as soon as possible?" in a 2021 Asahi Shimbun survey, she answered "in favor."
- 2024 - NHK responded "in favor."

The results of surveys conducted by various media outlets regarding legal reform to allow same-sex marriage are as follows:

- 2017 - She responded to the Asahi Shimbun newspaper, "I can't say either way."
- 2021 - NHK responded "in favor."
- 2021, 2024 - Regarding the introduction of a quota system, in NHK surveys in 2021 and 2024, she responded "in favor."
- 2024 - NHK responded "in favor."

=== Others ===
- 2017 - she answered that she “rather does not approve” of Abenomics.
  - - She responded that she did not approve of the Abe Cabinet's handling of the Moritomo Gakuen and Kake Gakuen scandals.
  - - I would say that I am in favor of postponing the consumption tax hike.
  - - The conspiracy law is not well-received.
  - - I am somewhat opposed to raising the consumption tax rate above 10% in the long term.
  - - Education should be free, from kindergarten and nursery school to university.
  - - Reducing inequality should be prioritized even if it means sacrificing some economic competitiveness.
  - - Government bonds are being absorbed steadily, so there is no need to worry about a fiscal deficit.
- May 6, 2021 - the government acknowledged for the first time the existence of the "Akagi Files" in the case of the falsification of public documents surrounding the sale of state-owned land to Moritomo Gakuen. However, on May 13, Prime Minister Yoshihide Suga wrote to media outlets stating that she would not conduct a reinvestigation in light of the existence of the files. Fumio Kishida, who was elected president of the Liberal Democratic Party in September, also denied the need for a reinvestigation during a representative question session at the House of Representatives plenary session on October 11. In response to a Mainichi Shimbun survey the same year asking what she thought of the government's response, she replied, "Further investigation and explanations should be conducted."

== Comment ==
In February 2018, she criticized the government's work style reform, saying, "Labor legislation has the role of restricting employers so as to ensure the safety and health of workers. A bill that incorporates the logic of those who employ workers will not lead to work style reform."

== Supporting organizations ==
- The JR Soren as a candidate recommended by the organization.
- The Information Workers' Union and a former member of the NTT Labor Union.

== Election history ==
House of Representatives (Japan)
Preceded by Tōru Doi	Member of the House of Representatives for Miyagi 1st district (single-member); 2017–present	Incumbent
Political offices
Preceded by Unknown	Sendai City Council; Taihaku Ward; 1999–2017	Succeeded by Unknown
Party political offices
Preceded by Unknown	Executive Officer for Gender Equality; Constitutional Democratic Party of Japan; 2021-2022	Succeeded by Unknown
