= Kurihara =

Kurihara 栗原市
- City
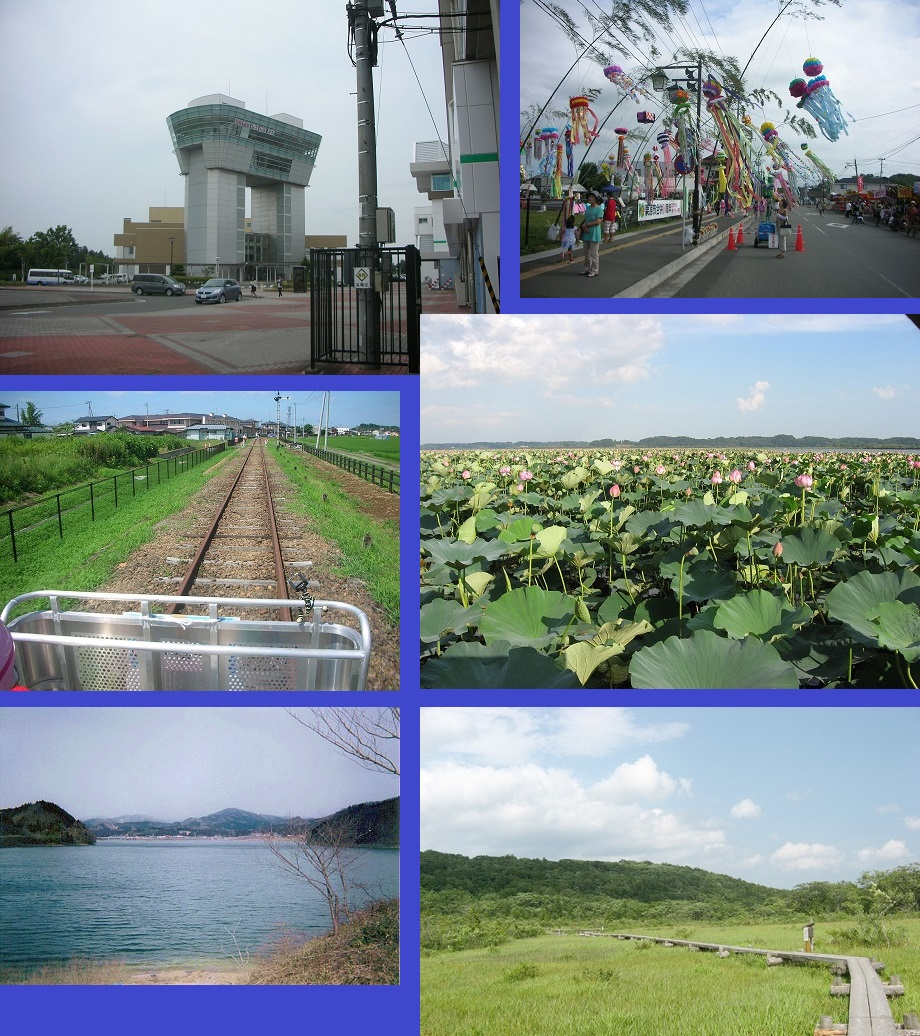
- Kurihara-Kogen Station, Tanabata, Kuriden Rail Park, Lotus flowers, Hanayama Dam, Kurikoma QNP

- Flag Seal

- Location of Kurihara in Miyagi Prefecture

- Coordinates: 38°43′48.4″N 141°1′17.3″E
- Country: Japan
- Region: Tōhoku
- Prefecture: Miyagi

Government
  - -Mayor: Isamu Satō

Area
  - Total: 804.97 km^{2} (310.80 sq mi)

Population (April 30, 2020)
  - Total: 66,565
  - Density: 82.693/km^{2} (214.17/sq mi)
- Time zone: UTC+9 (Japan Standard Time)
- Phone number: 0228-22-1122
- Address: 1-7-1 Tsukidate Yakushi, Kurihara-shi, Miyagi-ken 987-2293
- Climate: Cfa
- Website: Official website
- Symbols
- Flower: Nikkōkisuge (Hemerocallis dumortieri var. esculenta)
- Tree: Kousa Dogwood

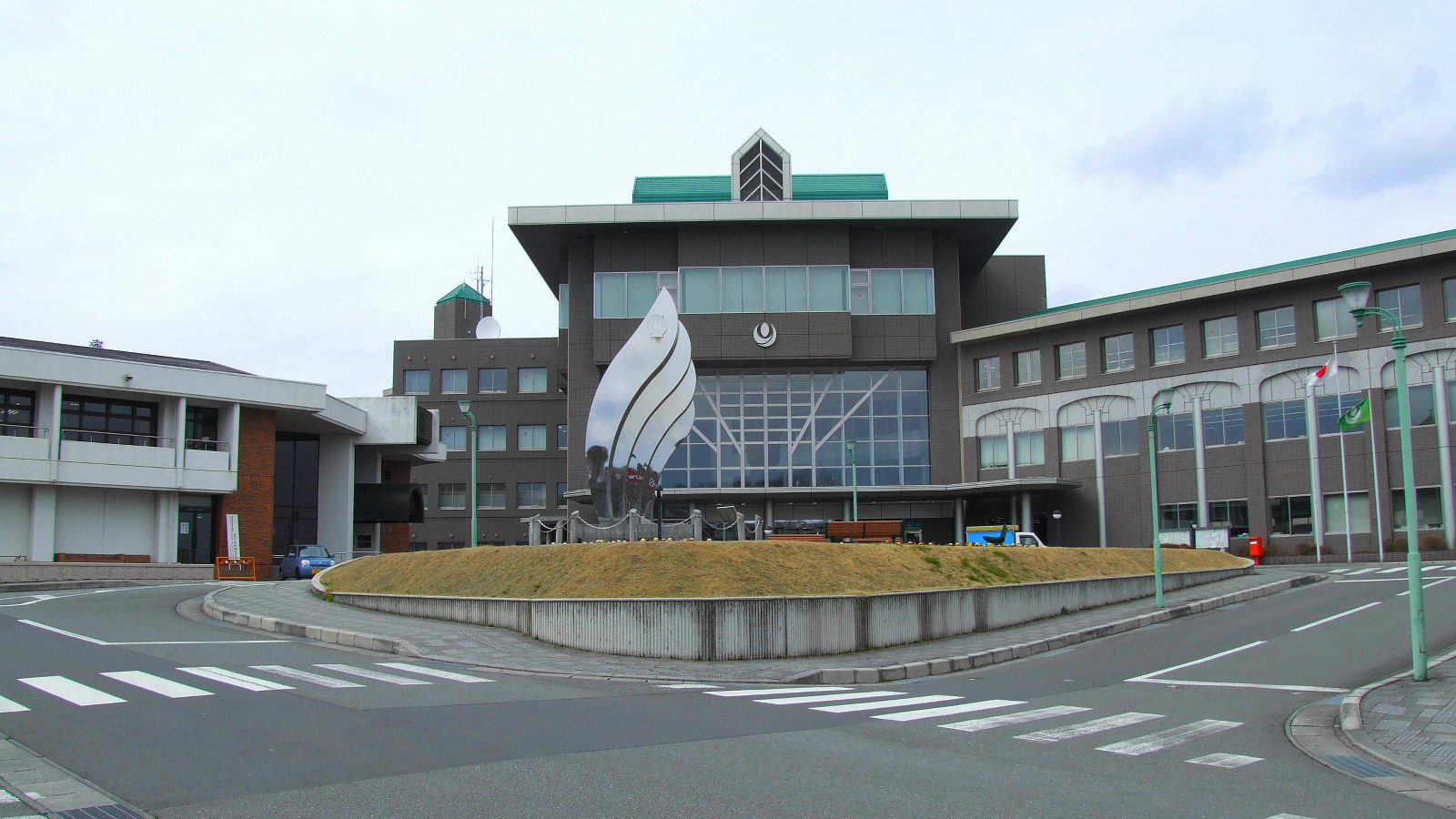
Kurihara City Hall

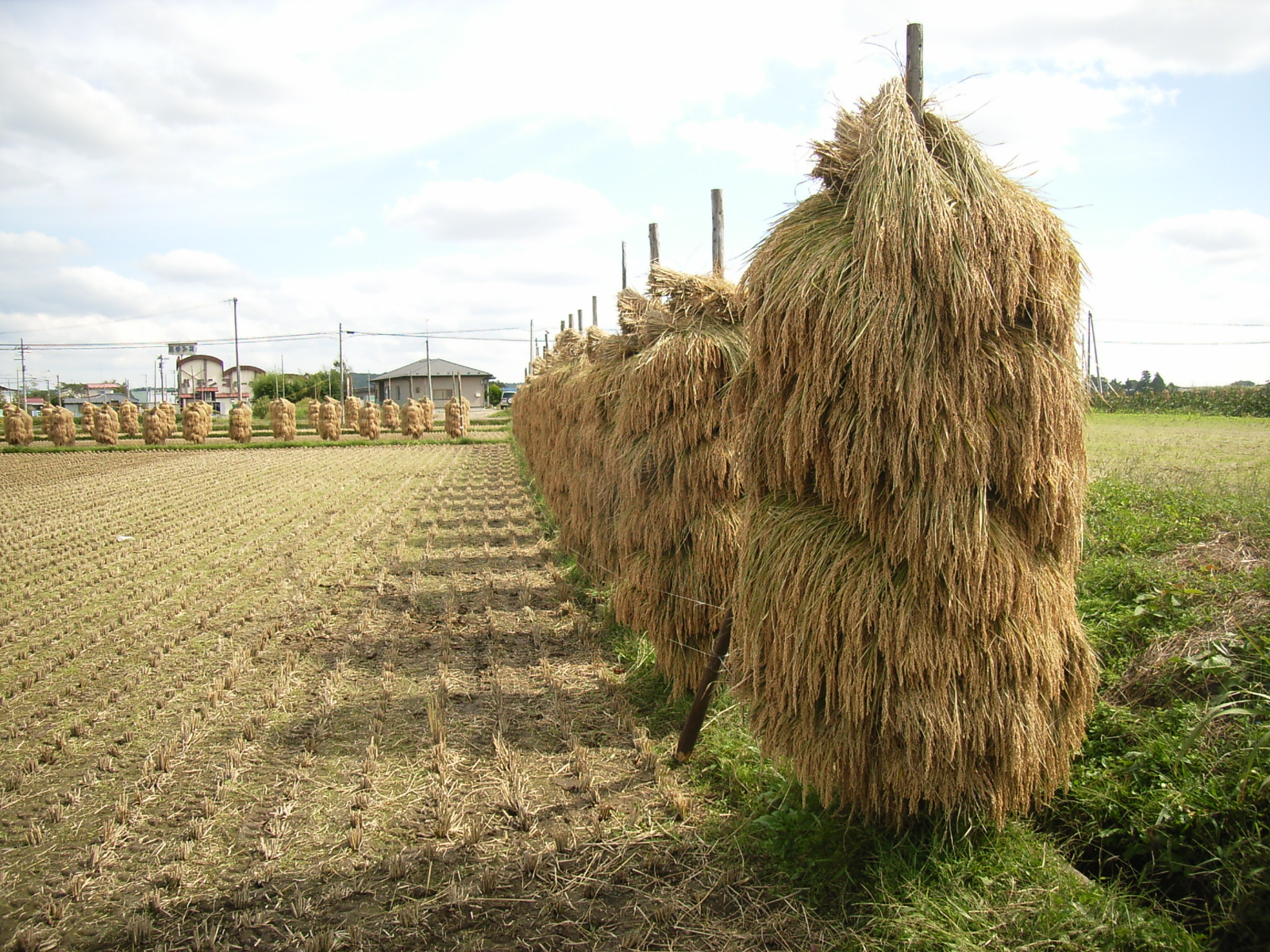
Rice drying after harvest in Kurihara

Kurihara (栗原市, Kurihara-shi) is a city located in Miyagi Prefecture, Japan. As of 30 April 2020, the city had an estimated population of 66,565, and a population density of 83 persons per km^{2} in 24,994 households. The total area of the city is 804.97 square kilometres (310.80 sq mi). Parts of the city are within the borders of the Kurikoma Quasi-National Park.

== Geography ==
Kurihara covers a part of the northwestern corner of Miyagi Prefecture. It is mostly rice farmland, and small mountain ridges, the largest of which cluster around Mount Kurikoma, the tallest mountain in Kurihara, which is located at the furthest northwestern point of Miyagi Prefecture. In summer, the lotus on Lake Izunuma bloom. In fall, Mount Kurikoma is covered in fall colors and in winter migrating swans and geese come in flocks to spend the season on Kurihara's lakes.

=== Neighboring municipalities ===
Akita Prefecture

- Higashinaruse
- Yuzawa

Iwate Prefecture

- Ichinoseki

Miyagi Prefecture

- Ōsaki
- Tome

== Climate ==
The climate of Kurihara is classified as humid subtropical (Cfa) per the Köppen climate classification system. As with most of Japan, the summers in Kurihara are hot and humid with temperatures usually around 24.5 °C (76.1 °F). Summer is also typhoon season, however, since Kurihara is so far north and inland the area is rarely affected. Fall and spring are mild, with temperatures in the low to mid 20s (Celsius). In fall, the days usually begin foggy and cold but clear up by midday. Spring comes late to the region and is mostly sunny punctuated with random light showers. The temperature fluctuates around freezing in winter, falling to an average low of −1.3 °C (29.7 °F), and snow levels vary with altitude.

Climate data for Tsukidate, Kurihara (elevation 25 m, 1991–2020 normals, extremes 1976–present)
Month	Jan	Feb	Mar	Apr	May	Jun	Jul	Aug	Sep	Oct	Nov	Dec	Year
Record high °C (°F)	15.0 (59.0)	18.7 (65.7)	22.9 (73.2)	29.5 (85.1)	33.5 (92.3)	33.7 (92.7)	36.7 (98.1)	37.3 (99.1)	34.7 (94.5)	30.0 (86.0)	23.9 (75.0)	19.8 (67.6)	37.3 (99.1)
Mean daily maximum °C (°F)	4.1 (39.4)	5.2 (41.4)	9.3 (48.7)	15.6 (60.1)	20.9 (69.6)	24.0 (75.2)	27.1 (80.8)	28.6 (83.5)	24.9 (76.8)	19.3 (66.7)	13.0 (55.4)	6.7 (44.1)	16.6 (61.9)
Daily mean °C (°F)	−0.3 (31.5)	0.4 (32.7)	3.7 (38.7)	9.2 (48.6)	14.9 (58.8)	18.9 (66.0)	22.4 (72.3)	23.6 (74.5)	19.8 (67.6)	13.6 (56.5)	7.2 (45.0)	2.0 (35.6)	11.3 (52.3)
Mean daily minimum °C (°F)	−4.7 (23.5)	−4.4 (24.1)	−1.8 (28.8)	2.9 (37.2)	9.4 (48.9)	14.6 (58.3)	18.8 (65.8)	19.8 (67.6)	15.5 (59.9)	8.3 (46.9)	1.9 (35.4)	−2.4 (27.7)	6.5 (43.7)
Record low °C (°F)	−17.0 (1.4)	−18.3 (−0.9)	−12.5 (9.5)	−6.6 (20.1)	0.7 (33.3)	5.6 (42.1)	6.2 (43.2)	11.2 (52.2)	3.8 (38.8)	−2.7 (27.1)	−6.0 (21.2)	−14.9 (5.2)	−18.3 (−0.9)
Average precipitation mm (inches)	42.1 (1.66)	35.1 (1.38)	73.0 (2.87)	87.3 (3.44)	111.9 (4.41)	134.2 (5.28)	185.4 (7.30)	151.6 (5.97)	166.3 (6.55)	131.2 (5.17)	62.9 (2.48)	49.8 (1.96)	1,230.8 (48.46)
Average precipitation days (≥ 1.0 mm)	8.0	7.2	9.2	9.3	9.8	10.5	13.9	11.7	11.7	9.4	8.6	9.0	118.1
Mean monthly sunshine hours	138.7	144.2	171.6	186.3	184.9	141.2	115.9	129.9	122.4	139.4	138.5	122.1	1,734.9
Source: Japan Meteorological Agency (1991–2020 normals, extremes 1976–present)

Climate data for Komanoyu, Kurihara (elevation 532 m, 1991–2020 normals, extremes 1976–present)
Month	Jan	Feb	Mar	Apr	May	Jun	Jul	Aug	Sep	Oct	Nov	Dec	Year
Record high °C (°F)	11.3 (52.3)	14.3 (57.7)	17.4 (63.3)	28.2 (82.8)	30.6 (87.1)	30.8 (87.4)	33.0 (91.4)	33.3 (91.9)	31.5 (88.7)	26.7 (80.1)	20.9 (69.6)	16.5 (61.7)	33.3 (91.9)
Mean daily maximum °C (°F)	0.1 (32.2)	0.8 (33.4)	4.5 (40.1)	11.4 (52.5)	17.3 (63.1)	20.4 (68.7)	23.7 (74.7)	24.9 (76.8)	21.1 (70.0)	15.6 (60.1)	9.4 (48.9)	3.0 (37.4)	12.7 (54.9)
Daily mean °C (°F)	−2.9 (26.8)	−2.4 (27.7)	0.6 (33.1)	6.3 (43.3)	12.0 (53.6)	15.9 (60.6)	19.7 (67.5)	20.7 (69.3)	17.0 (62.6)	11.2 (52.2)	5.2 (41.4)	−0.2 (31.6)	8.6 (47.5)
Mean daily minimum °C (°F)	−6.3 (20.7)	−6.2 (20.8)	−3.4 (25.9)	1.3 (34.3)	6.8 (44.2)	11.6 (52.9)	16.2 (61.2)	17.2 (63.0)	13.3 (55.9)	6.8 (44.2)	0.8 (33.4)	−3.6 (25.5)	4.6 (40.3)
Record low °C (°F)	−15.5 (4.1)	−14.1 (6.6)	−12.7 (9.1)	−7.9 (17.8)	−1.2 (29.8)	1.7 (35.1)	6.3 (43.3)	8.7 (47.7)	1.0 (33.8)	−1.7 (28.9)	−7.2 (19.0)	−13.6 (7.5)	−15.5 (4.1)
Average precipitation mm (inches)	126.8 (4.99)	96.8 (3.81)	125.8 (4.95)	135.7 (5.34)	164.8 (6.49)	228.2 (8.98)	263.5 (10.37)	253.9 (10.00)	261.6 (10.30)	187.0 (7.36)	137.4 (5.41)	152.9 (6.02)	2,124.9 (83.66)
Average snowfall cm (inches)	268 (106)	207 (81)	169 (67)	37 (15)	0 (0)	0 (0)	0 (0)	0 (0)	0 (0)	0 (0)	36 (14)	208 (82)	924 (364)
Average precipitation days (≥ 1.0 mm)	19.8	16.9	15.9	13.4	12.5	13.8	16.7	16.4	15.5	13.4	15.4	19.0	188.3
Mean monthly sunshine hours	82.0	88.7	128.9	168.1	178.3	127.4	100.6	111.3	100.2	122.9	113.5	80.3	1,401
Source: Japan Meteorological Agency (1991–2020 normals, extremes 1976–present)

== Demographics ==
Per Japanese census data, the population of Kurihara peaked at around the year 1950 and has declined over the past 70 years.

Historical population
Year	Pop.	±%
1920	82,759	—
1930	90,109	+8.9%
1940	101,186	+12.3%
1950	131,599	+30.1%
1960	129,144	−1.9%
1970	104,888	−18.8%
1980	95,801	−8.7%
1990	91,852	−4.1%
2000	84,947	−7.5%
2010	74,932	−11.8%
2020	64,637	−13.7%

== History ==
The area of present-day Kurihara was part of ancient Mutsu Province, and has been settled since at least the Jōmon period by the Emishi people. During the later portion of the Heian period, the area was ruled by the Northern Fujiwara. During the Sengoku period, the area was contested by various samurai clans before the area came under the control of the Date clan of Sendai Domain during the Edo period, under the Tokugawa shogunate.

With the establishment of the modern municipalities system on April 1, 1889, the area was organized into Kurihara District, Miyagi Prefecture.

During the Meiji period, many mines were dug in the mountains of Kurihara, and the Hosokura mine was at one point Japan's largest producer of lead and zinc. The mine closed in 1987.

The city of Kurihara was established on April 1, 2005, from the merger of the towns of Ichihasama, Kannari, Kurikoma, Miyagi, Semine, Shiwahime, Takashimizu, Tsukidate, Uguisuzawa, Miyagi, and Wakayanagi, Miyagi, and the village of Hanayama (all from Kurihara District, which was dissolved as a result of the merger). The new city hall is located in former Tsukidate. Although technically referred to as a "city", Kurihara in fact functions more like a county composed of ten separate towns. This arrangement is similar to English unitary authorities in the United Kingdom, such as Herefordshire.

During 2011 Tōhoku earthquake, Kurihara–specifically the former town of Tsukidate–experienced the strongest shaking, with a Shindo 7 intensity.

== Government ==
Kurihara has a mayor-council form of government with a directly elected mayor and a unicameral city legislature of 26 members. Kurihara contributes two seats to the Miyagi Prefectural legislature. In terms of national politics, after the abolishment of the Miyagi 6th district in 2022, the city is part of Miyagi 5th district of the lower house of the Diet of Japan.

== Economy ==
The economy of Kurihara is largely based on agriculture. Mining, which once formed a significant percentage of the economy has largely disappeared with the closure of the last mines in Uguisuzawa in the 1980s.

== Education ==
Kurihara has 13 public elementary schools and eight public junior high schools operated by the city government and five public high schools operated by the Miyagi Prefectural Board of Education. The prefecture also operates one special education school for the handicapped.

== Transportation ==
=== Railway ===
East Japan Railway Company (JR East) - Tōhoku Shinkansen

- Kurikoma-Kōgen

East Japan Railway Company (JR East) - Tōhoku Main Line

- Semine, Arikabe

=== Highway ===
- Tōhoku Expressway
- National Route 4
- National Route 398
- National Route 457

== Local attractions ==
- Former Arikabe-juku Honjin, National Historic Site
- Iji Castle ruins, a National Historic Site
- Irinosawa Site, National Historic Site
- Kurikoma Quasi-National Park is centered on Mt. Kurikoma, a dormant volcano straddling the tri-prefectural border of Miyagi, Akita and Iwate. It is 1627 meters high, conical, and has a 365 degree panoramic view. There is an abundance of diverse alpine flora in the wetlands near its peak and expansive virgin beech forests that are home to many precious birds, insects, and other fauna. There are extensive hiking trails with hot springs located at the base and top of the mountain.
- Miyagi Prefectural Sanctuary Center of Izunuma-Uchinuma is a protected area created in order to protect the abundant plant and animal life in the area. Lake Izunuma, the largest lake in Miyagi, is home to 223 species of waterfowl, or 42% of Japan's 535 total species of water birds. Migrating birds including swans, geese, and ducks, winter here. From late July to late August is when the lotus flowers bloom and the Izunuma-Uchinuma Lotus Festival is held.
- Nuruyu Bansho Site, National Historic Site
- Sannō-Gakoi Site, National Historic Site
- Sekai Yachi Wetlands Flower Park is a 14.34-hectare wetlands area is situated in the southern foothills of Mt. Kurikoma, between 669 and 707 meters above sea level. Late June is the best time to see the Middendorff's daylilies. The flowering seasons are spring and summer.

=== Culture ===
Kurihara is known for its rice production. There are also a number of waterfalls, parks filled with cherry blossoms in spring, and flower gardens. These include: Abazu Gorge, Shiraito Falls, Gorindoyama Park, Hasama River Park, and Sanno Historic Park Iris Garden.

It is also a renowned place for viewing the autumn leaves, especially around Mt. Kurikoma. Kurihara also has an abundance of hot spring resorts. These include: Yu-no-Kura Hot Spring, Yubama Hot Spring, Hanayama Hot Spring, and Nuruyu Hot Spring.

=== Festivals ===
- Late March Tohoku Draft Horse Pull Kurikoma Tournament (Kurikoma)
- 1st Sun of April Obasama Festival and Longevity Rites (Kannari)
- Mid-April Izumiya Oyashiki Festival (Semine)
- April 29 Masaoka Festival (Ichihasama)
- Mid-April Cherry Blossom Festivals (all areas)
- May 5 Hanayama Rifle Festival (Hanayama)
- Mid-June Iris Festival (Ichihasama)
- Mid-June Ichihasama Lily Garden Opening (Ichihasama)
- 1st Sun of July Iris Festival and Kagura Sacred Dance (Ichihasama)
- 3rd Sun of July Michinoku Kagura Sacred Dance Festival (Tsukidate)
- Late July Kurikoma Float Parade Festival (Kurikoma)
- August Izunuma-Uchinuma Lotus Festival (Wakayanagi, Tsukidate)
- August 5–6 Tsukidate Tanabata Festival (Tsukidate)
- August 14 Waterwheel (Suisha) Festival (Shiwahime)
- August 15–16 Wakayanagi Summer Festival (Wakayanagi)
- Early October Autumn Lake Festival (Hanayama)
- Oct-Nov Tagaiichi Markets and Festivals
- November 3 Tsukidate Yakushi Festival
- Early Nov Industries Festival
- Dec-Feb Festivals to Beckon and Welcome Spring (all areas)
- Mid-Jan Donto Festivals (all areas)

== Notable people from Kurihara ==
- Kōbōyama Daizō, sumo wrestler
- Yoshiaki Hoshi, musician
- Jun Izumida, professional wrestler
- Yohei "Yoh" Komatsu, Japanese professional wrestler
