= Azuma Konno =

Japanese politician

- 今野 東
- Official portrait, 2012

Member of the House of Councillors
- In office 29 July 2007 – 4 December 2012
- Preceded by: Multi-member district
- Succeeded by: Yoshikazu Tarui
- Constituency: National PR

Member of the House of Representatives
- In office 26 June 2000 – 28 April 2005
- Preceded by: Kazuo Aichi
- Succeeded by: Tōru Doi
- Constituency: Miyagi 1st

Personal details
- Born: 17 December 1942 Shiogama, Miyagi, Japan
- Died: 24 April 2013 (aged 70) Sendai, Miyagi, Japan
- Party: Democratic
- Education: Meiji Gakuin University

Azuma Konno (今野 東, Konno Azuma; 17 December 1947 – 24 April 2013) was a Japanese politician of the Democratic Party of Japan, who served as a member of the House of Councillors and the House of Representatives in the Diet (national legislature).

A native of Shiogama, Miyagi Prefecture and graduate of Meiji Gakuin University, he was elected to the House of Councillors for the first time in 2007 after serving in the House of Representatives for two terms.
