= Emiko Okuyama =

Japanese politician

- 奥山 恵美子
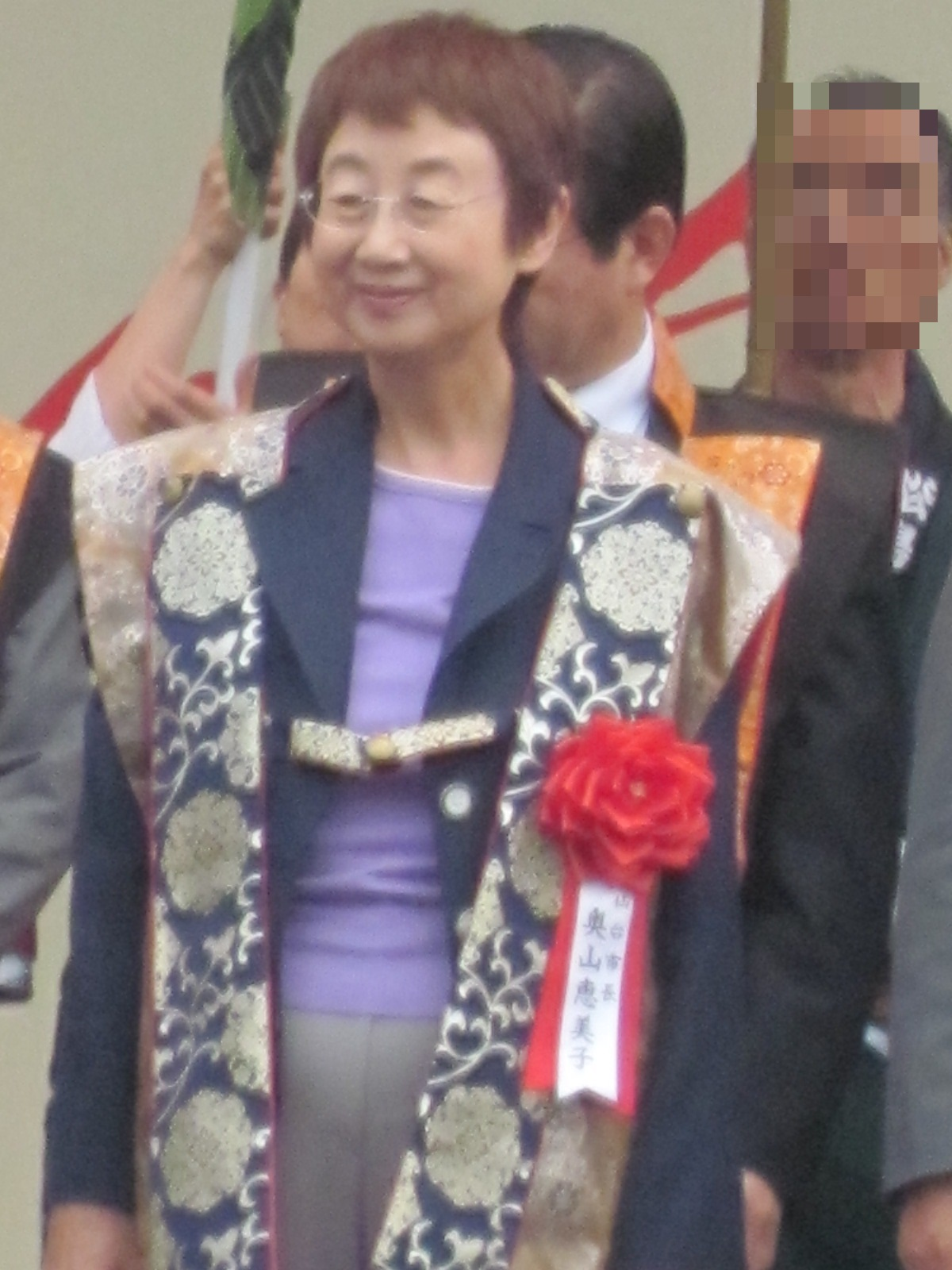
- Okuyama in 2015

Mayor of Sendai
- In office 22 August 2009 – 21 August 2017
- Preceded by: Katsuhiko Umehara
- Succeeded by: Kazuko Kōri

Personal details
- Born: 23 June 1951 (age 75) Akita, Japan
- Party: Independent
- Education: Tohoku University

Emiko Okuyama (奥山 恵美子; born 23 June 1951) is a Japanese politician. She served as the mayor of Sendai from 2009 to 2017.

== Career ==
Okuyama was born in Akita City, Japan on 23 June 1951. Her father was a public official, and when Okuyama was a child he would often take her around the country with him. After graduating from Tohoku University's economics department, she began working in the Sendai City town hall. She rose through many positions in the city government until being appointed the vice mayor in 2007.

In July 2009, Okuyama ran for Sendai City mayor with the support of the Democratic Party of Japan and the Social Democratic Party of Japan. She was the first woman to become elected mayor of a major Japanese city.

In the aftermath of the 2011 Tohoku earthquake and tsunami, Okuyama was recognized by the German Sustainability Award in 2012. She also has spoken before the United Nations about Sendai's disaster-recovery efforts and plans to increase the city's disaster preparedness.

Okuyama was re-elected on 11 August 2013, overcoming Tatsuya Kadono of the Japanese Communist Party. In 2017, Okuyama decided to retire, and chose not to run for office again. Although she had backed Hironori Sugahara in his campaign for the mayoral position, Kazuko Kori was elected the Mayor of Sendai instead.

Public Office
Predecessor： Katsuhiko Umehara	Mayor of Sendai City; 2009 – 2017	Successor： Kazuko Kōri
