= Kazuko Kōri =

Japanese politician (born 1957)

Kazuko Kori
- 郡 和子
- Official portrait, 2011

Mayor of Sendai
- Incumbent
- Assumed office 22 August 2017
- Preceded by: Emiko Okuyama

Member of the House of Representatives
- In office 12 September 2005 – 9 July 2017
- Preceded by: Multi-member district
- Succeeded by: Izumi Yoshida
- Constituency: Tohoku PR (2005–2009); Miyagi 1st (2009–2012); Tohoku PR (2012–2017)

Personal details
- Born: 31 March 1957 (age 69) Sendai, Miyagi, Japan
- Party: Independent
- Other political affiliations: DPJ (2005–2016); DP (2016–2017)
- Education: Tohoku Gakuin University

Kazuko Kori (郡 和子, Kōri Kazuko; born 31 March 1957) is a Japanese politician serving as the mayor of Sendai. She was formerly a member of the Democratic Party of Japan and served in the House of Representatives. A native of Sendai, Miyagi and graduate of Tohoku Gakuin University, she was elected for the first time in 2005 after working at a TV broadcaster.
