= Kei Takahashi =

Japanese luger (born 1979)

Personal information
- Nationality: Japanese
- Born: 1 May 1979 (age 45); Nagano, Japan

Sport
- Sport: Luge

Kei Takahashi (高橋 敬, Takahashi Kei, born 1 May 1979) is a Japanese luger. He competed at the 1998 Winter Olympics and the 2002 Winter Olympics.
