= Katsuhiko Umehara =

Japanese politician

- 梅原 克彦
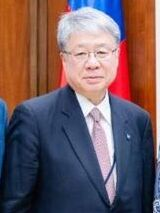
- Umehara in 2025

Mayor of Sendai
- In office 22 August 2005 – 21 August 2009
- Preceded by: Hajimu Fujii
- Succeeded by: Emiko Okuyama

Personal details
- Born: 29 March 1954 (age 72) Sendai, Miyagi, Japan
- Party: Conservative
- Education: University of Tokyo

Katsuhiko Umehara (梅原 克彦, Umehara Katsuhiko; born 29 March 1954) is a Japanese politician who served as the mayor of Sendai, Miyagi. Upon graduation from the University of Tokyo in 1978, he joined the Ministry of International Trade and Industry. After leaving the ministry in 2005, he was elected mayor of Sendai in the same year.
