= Mitsuru Sakurai =

Japanese politician (born 1956)

- 櫻井 充
- Official portrait, 2012

Member of the House of Councillors
- Incumbent
- Assumed office 26 July 1998
- Preceded by: Kaname Endō
- Constituency: Miyagi at-large

Personal details
- Born: 12 May 1956 (age 70) Miyagino, Sendai, Japan
- Party: Liberal Democratic
- Education: Tokyo Medical and Dental University; Tohoku University

Mitsuru Sakurai (桜井 充, Sakurai Mitsuru; born 12 May 1956) is a Japanese politician formerly of the Democratic Party of Japan and is now a member of the Liberal Democratic Party. He is a member of the House of Councillors in the Diet (national legislature).

== Overview ==
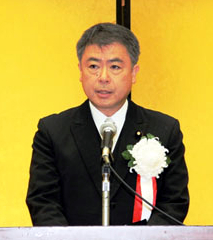
Mitsuru Sakurai (at the Central Government Building No.5 on November 13, 2012)

A native of Sendai, Miyagi, he attended Tokyo Medical and Dental University as an undergraduate and received a Ph.D. in medicine from Tohoku University. He was elected to the House of Councillors for the first time in 2004. He was made Deputy Treasury Minister in 2010.
