= Kurikoma-Kōgen Station =

Railway station in Kurihara, Miyagi Prefecture, Japan

Kurikoma-Kōgen Station くりこま高原駅
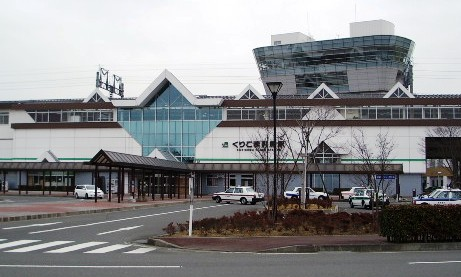

General information
- Location: 284 Shiwahime shin-kumaya, Kurihara-shi, Miyagi-ken 989-5612; Japan
- Coordinates: 38.748728°N 141.071577°E
- Operator: JR East
- Line: Tōhoku Shinkansen
- Distance: 386.94 km (240.43 mi) from Tokyo
- Platforms: 2 side platforms
- Tracks: 2

Construction
- Structure type: Elevated

Other information
- Status: Staffed (Midori no Madoguchi)
- Website: Official website

History
- Opened: 10 March 1990; 36 years ago

Passengers
- FY2018: 1,048 daily

Services
Preceding station	JR East	Following station
Furukawa towards Tokyo	Tōhoku Shinkansen Hayabusa	Ichinoseki towards Shin-Aomori
Furukawa towards Tokyo	Tōhoku Shinkansen Yamabiko	Ichinoseki towards Morioka
Location
- Location within Miyagi Prefecture Location within Japan

Kurikoma-Kōgen Station (くりこま高原駅, Kurikoma-Kōgen-eki) is a railway station in the city of Kurihara, Miyagi, Japan, operated by the East Japan Railway Company (JR East).

== Lines ==
Kurikoma-Kōgen Station is served by the Tōhoku Shinkansen high-speed line from Tokyo to Shin-Aomori, and is located 386.97 kilometers from the starting point of the line at Tokyo.

== Station layout ==
The elevated station has two side platforms serving two tracks. The platforms are equipped with platform screen doors. The station has a "Midori no Madoguchi" staffed ticket office.

=== Platforms ===
11	■ Tōhoku Shinkansen	for Sendai and Tokyo
12	■ Tōhoku Shinkansen	for Morioka and Shin-Aomori

== History ==
The station opened on 10 March 1990.

== Passenger statistics ==
In fiscal 2018, the station was used by an average of 1,048 passengers daily (boarding passengers only).

== Surrounding area ==
- National Route 398
- Shiwahime Post Office
- Former Shiwahime town hall

== Buses ==
- Gureen Kankō Bus
  - For Ishikoshi Station via Wakayanagi
  - For Tsukidate
- Higashi-Nihon Kyūkō Bus
  - For Sendai Station

== See also ==
- List of railway stations in Japan
