= Jiro Aichi =

Japanese politician

- 愛知 治郎
- Official portrait, 2013

Member of the House of Councillors
- In office 23 July 2001 – 28 July 2019
- Preceded by: Hiroaki Kameya
- Succeeded by: Noriko Ishigaki
- Constituency: Miyagi at-large

Personal details
- Born: 23 June 1969 (age 57) New York, U.S.
- Party: Liberal Democratic
- Parent: Kazuo Aichi (father)
- Relatives: Kiichi Aichi (grandfather)
- Education: Chuo University

Jiro Aichi (愛知 治郎, Aichi Jirō; born June 23, 1969) is a Japanese politician of the Liberal Democratic Party, a member of the House of Councillors in the Diet (national legislature). He is the son of Kazuo Aichi. A native of Sendai, Miyagi and graduate of Chuo University, he was elected for the first time in 2001. He is affiliated to the revisionist lobby Nippon Kaigi.
