= Kazuo Aichi =

Japanese politician (1937–2024)

- 愛知 和男
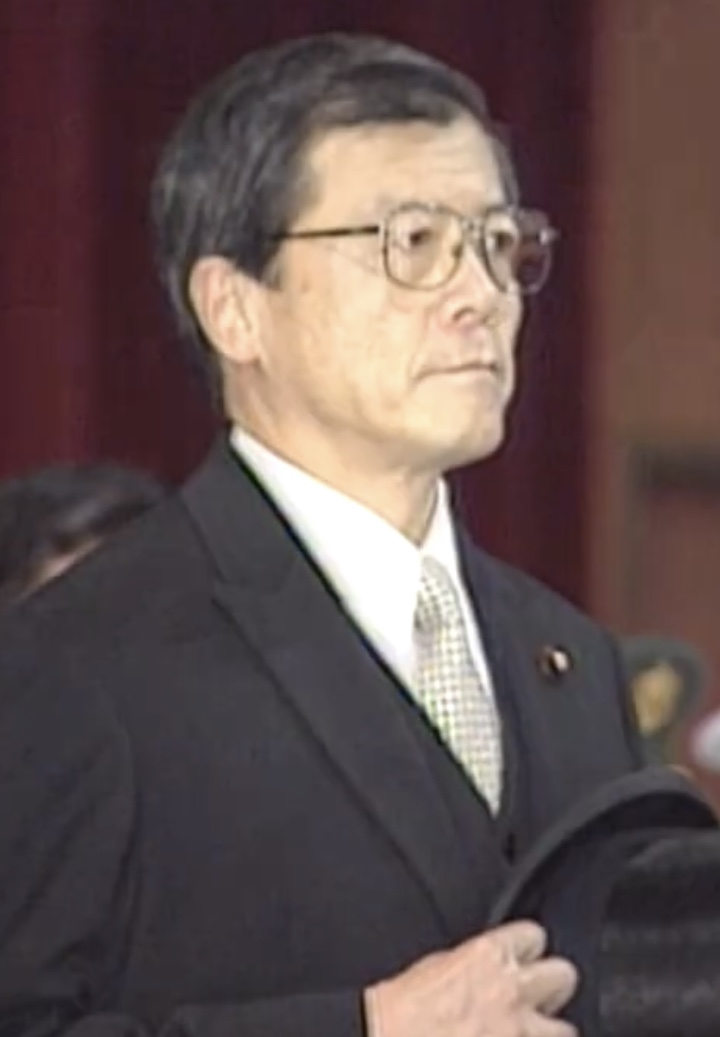
- Aichi in 1993

Director-General of the Japan Defense Agency
- In office 2 December 1993 – 28 April 1994
- Prime Minister: Morihiro Hosokawa
- Preceded by: Nakanishi Keisuke
- Succeeded by: Atsushi Kanda

Director-General of the Environmental Agency
- In office 2 December 1990 – 5 November 1991
- Prime Minister: Toshiki Kaifu
- Preceded by: Kitagawa Ishimatsu
- Succeeded by: Shozaburo Nakamura

Member of the House of Representatives
- In office 12 September 2005 – 21 July 2009
- Constituency: Tokyo PR
- In office 10 December 1976 – 2 June 2000
- Preceded by: Kiichi Aichi
- Succeeded by: Azuma Konno
- Constituency: Former Miyagi 1st (1976–1996); Miyagi 1st (1996–2000)

Personal details
- Born: 20 July 1937 Ōta, Tokyo, Japan
- Died: 3 May 2024 (aged 86) Tokyo, Japan
- Party: Liberal Democratic
- Other political affiliations: JRP (1993–1994); NFP (1994–1997)
- Children: Jiro Aichi
- Relatives: Kiichi Aichi (father-in-law)
- Education: University of Tokyo

Kazuo Aichi (愛知 和男, Aichi Kazuo; 20 July 1937 – 3 May 2024) was a Japanese politician.

== Early life ==
A native of Ōta, Tokyo Aichi graduated of the University of Tokyo.

== Political career ==
Aichi served as a member of the House of Representatives of Japan for the Liberal Democratic Party.

He was elected to the House of Representatives for the first time in 1976 and served until 2000, when he was defeated for re-election. He later served again from 2005 to 2009, when he unsuccessfully stood for re-election.

From 1993 to 1994 Aichi was Director General of the Japan Defense Agency and from 1990 to 1991 he served as the Commissioner of the Environment Agency.

== Death ==
Aichi died from COVID-19 on May 3, 2024, at the age of 86.
