= Noriko Ishigaki =

Japanese politician (born 1974)

- 石垣 のりこ
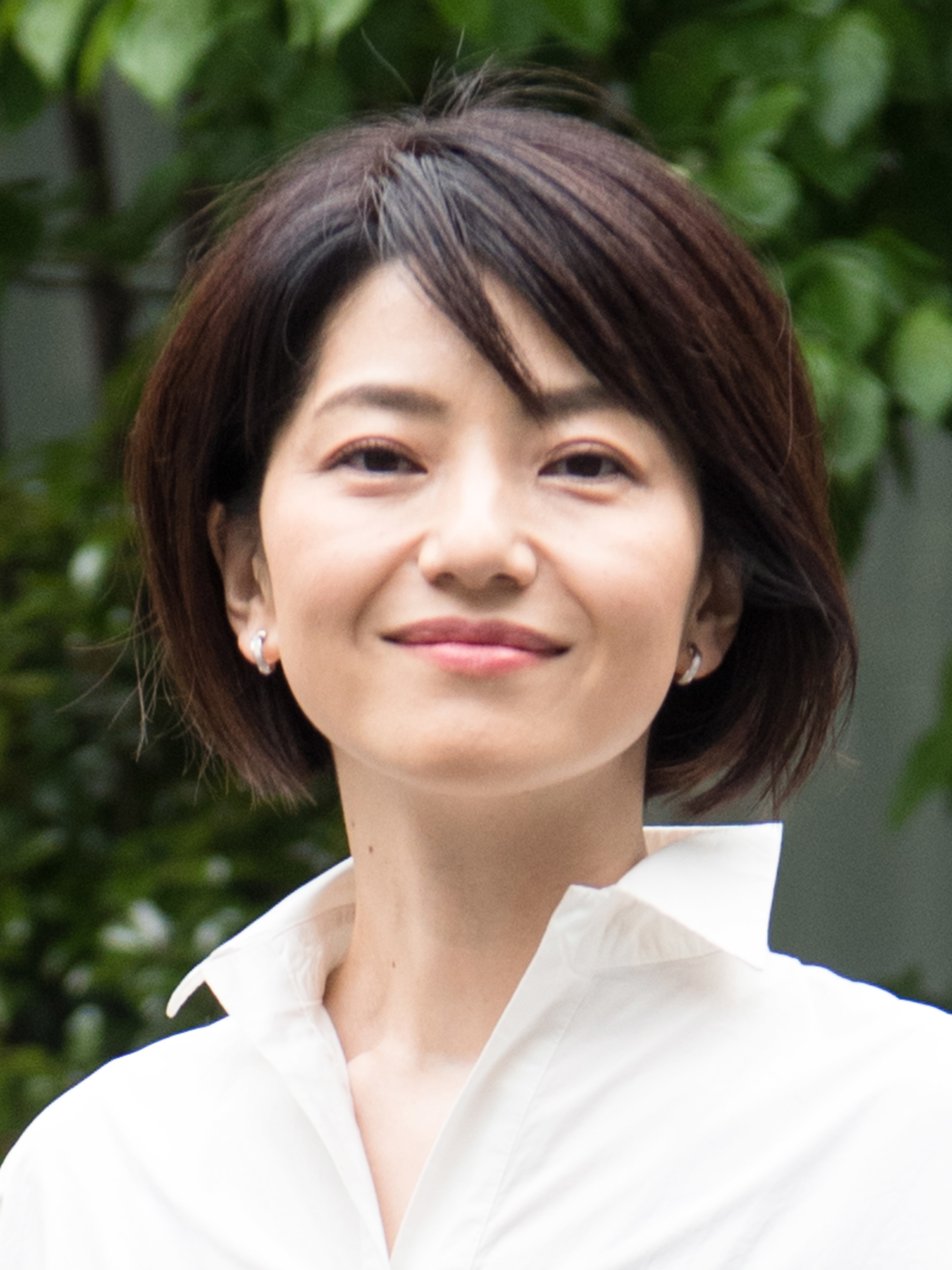
- Ishigaki in 2019

Member of the House of Councillors
- Incumbent
- Assumed office 29 July 2019
- Preceded by: Jiro Aichi
- Constituency: Miyagi at-large

Personal details
- Born: 1 August 1974 (age 52) Shiogama, Miyagi, Japan
- Party: Constitutional Democratic
- Education: Miyagi University of Education

Noriko Ishigaki (born Noriko Ogawa on August 1, 1974, in Miyagi Prefecture, Japan) is a Japanese politician who has served as a member of the House of Councillors of Japan since 2019. She represents the Miyagi at-large district and is a member of the Constitutional Democratic Party of Japan.
