= Sakihito Ozawa =

Japanese politician

- 小沢 鋭仁
- Official portrait, 2010

Minister of the Environment
- In office 16 September 2009 – 8 June 2010
- Prime Minister: Yukio Hatoyama; Naoto Kan
- Preceded by: Tetsuo Saito
- Succeeded by: Goshi Hosono

Member of the House of Representatives
- In office 18 July 1993 – 28 September 2017
- Preceded by: Risei Ueda
- Succeeded by: Multi-member district
- Constituency: See list: Yamanashi at-large (1993–1996); Southern Kanto PR (1996–2000); Yamanashi 1st (2000–2012); Kinki PR (2014–2017); Southern Kanto PR (2012–2014)

Personal details
- Born: 31 May 1954 (age 72) Koshu, Yamanashi, Japan
- Party: Independent
- Other political affiliations: JNP (1992–1994); NPS (1994–1996); DP (1996–1998); DPJ (1998–2012); JRP (2012–2014); JIP (2015–2017); KnT (2017–2018)
- Education: University of Tokyo

Sakihito Ozawa (小沢 鋭仁, Ozawa Sakihito; born 31 May 1954) is a Japanese politician and former banker. He was a member of the House of Representatives in the Diet of Japan and previously served as leader of the Vision of Reform party, which he formed in December 2015. A native of Kofu, Yamanashi, he graduated from the University of Tokyo and received a master's degree in political science from Saitama University. Shortly after graduating, he studied economics and policy under Eisuke Sakakibara. Before joining the House of Representatives, he worked at Tokyo Bank and served as an advisor to several lawmakers. He was elected to the House of Representatives for the first time in 1993 as a member of Morihiro Hosokawa's Japan New Party. He was the Minister of the Environment during Yukio Hatoyama's prime ministership in 2009–2010.

== Early career ==
In 1981, Sakihito obtained a job within the Bank of Tokyo. Two years later, Sakihito received an invitation from Representative Takujiro Hamada to join the Freedom Society Forum policy study group and became its Secretary General.

In 1992, Sakihito joined the Japan New Party under Morihiro Hosokawa. During Morihiro's tenure, Sakihito served as a policy advisor. After Mohiro's resignation and the collapse of the JNP, Sakihito joined New Party Saigake. Two years later, Sakihito contested a seat within the Southern Kanto PR block. Sakihito won the seat and entered the diet. Sakihito joined the Democratic Party of Japan in 1998. During the late 90s, Sakihito held numerous positions within the DPJ, including Deputy Secretary General and Director of the Policy Research Council.

During the 2000s, Sakihito held many environment-related committee roles. In 2004, he was appointed the Chairman of the Committee on the environment in the House of Representatives. In 2008, he was appointed the Deputy-Chief of the Global Warming Prevention Headquarters.

== Minister of the Environment ==
As Minister of the Environment, Sakihito spearheaded multiple initiatives related to global warming, including a 25% reduction in Carbon Dioxide emissions known as the "Hatoyama Initiative". However, his proposals were met with opposition by business lobbyists, who argued that such initiatives could hamper economic growth and worsen the contextual recession.

Sakihito encouraged other nations to adopt a cap on Carbon Dioxide emissions.

Sakihito encouraged the research and implementation of electric powered taxis throughout Tokyo, to reduce CO_{2} emissions and improve air quality.

In December 2009, Sakihito created a $15 billion climate aid package for developing countries, in an effort to fight desertification and climate change in developing countries. Sakihito also entered Japan into a $3.5 billion forest preservation pact with America, Australia, France, the United Kingdom and Norway.

== Post-Cabinet ==
In 2011, Sakihito was appointed Chair of the DPJ tax panel. He advocated for the central bank to purchase debt and an increase in bond sales, to serve as an alternative to Naoto Kan's proposed tax hike after the 2011 earthquake.

In 2012, Sakihito joined the nationalist Japan Restoration Party. He helped to sponsor a bill to legalise casino gambling in 2014. He encouraged cross-party dialogue and bi-partisanship in the process of legalizing casino gambling.

House of Representatives (Japan)
| Preceded by Eiichi Nakao | Representative for Yamanashi 1st district (single-member); 2000–2012 | Succeeded by Noriko Miyagawa |
| Preceded by Yoshio Maki | Chairman of the House of Representatives committee on the Environment; 2010–2011 | Succeeded by Yukio Ubukata |
| Preceded by Ryū Matsumoto | Chairman of the House of Representatives committee on the Environment; 2004–2005 | Succeeded by Takahide Kimura |
| New constituency | Representative for the Southern Kantō PR block 1996–2000 | Succeeded by |
| Preceded by Shin Kanemaru; Risei Ueda; Azuma Koshiishi; Eiichi Nakao; Kunio Tanabe | Representative for Yamanashi at-large district (multi-member); 1993–1996; Served alongside: Mitsuo Horiuchi, Azuma Koshiishi, Shōmei Yokouchi, Eiichi Nakao | District eliminated |
Political offices
| Preceded by Tetsuo Saitō | Minister of the Environment; 2009–2010 | Succeeded by Ryū Matsumoto |
