= Yamanashi 1st district =

Japanese single-member electoral district

Map of Yamanashi Prefecture single-member districts

Yamanashi 1st district (山梨[県第]1区, Yamanashi[-ken dai-]ikku) is a single-member electoral district for the House of Representatives, the lower house of the National Diet of Japan located in western Yamanashi Prefecture. As of September 2022 it had 424,557 eligible voters.

== History ==
Before the introduction of single-member districts in the 1990s, all of Yamanashi had formed one at-large district that elected five members to the House of Representatives. After the last House of Representatives election under the old system in 1993, Representatives from Yamanashi included Liberal Democrat Eiichi Nakao, Socialist Azuma Koshiishi and reformist Sakihito Ozawa.

== Representatives over time ==
Nakao and Koshiishi contested the new 1st district in 1996: Nakao won. Koshiishi was elected to the Diet in the 1998 election to represent Yamanashi in the House of Councillors.

In the 2000 Representatives election, Ozawa challenged Nakao and unseated him. He held onto the seat until 2012 when he joined the Japan Restoration Party and lost the district to Liberal Democratic newcomer Noriko Miyagawa, a former junior high school teacher.

Katsuhito Nakajima won the seat for the Democratic Party of Japan, and then continued to represent the electorate for the Democratic Party after the DPJ merged with other parties to form this new party. He was then re-elected as an independent in the 2017 election.

The LDP's Shinichi Nakatani was elected in 2021, but was then defeated in the 2024 election by Nakajima, who won the seat back running as a member of the Constitutional Democratic Party.

== Area ==
=== Cities ===
- Kōfu (prefectural capital)
- Nirasaki
- Minami-Alps
- Hokuto
- Kai
- Chūō

=== Towns ===
- Ichikawamisato
- Shōwa
- Towns of Minamikoma District

Yamanashi lost one electoral constituency in reapportionment in 2013. Previously, the 1st district covered Kōfu, Enzan, Yamanashi City and Higashiyamanashi District. In September 2012, 218,115 voters were registered in the district, giving its voters one of the highest vote weights in the country.

== List of representatives ==
Representative	Party	Dates	Notes
Eiichi Nakao	LDP	1996 – 2000	
Sakihito Ozawa	DPJ	2000 – 2012	Joined Japan Restoration Party in 2012; Re-elected in the S. Kantō PR block
Noriko Miyagawa	LDP	2012 – 2014	Re-elected in the S. Kantō PR block
Katsuhito Nakajima	DPJ	2014 – 2016	
Katsuhito Nakajima	DP	2016 – 2017	
Katsuhito Nakajima	Independent	2017 – 2021	Re-elected in the S. Kantō PR block
Shin'ichi Nakatani	LDP	2021 – 2024	Re-elected in the S. Kantō PR block
Katsuhito Nakajima	CDP	2024 – 2026	
Shin'ichi Nakatani	LDP	2026 –	

== Election results ==
2026
Party	Candidate	Votes	%	±%
LDP	Shinichi Nakatani	128,168	52.35	▲9.87
Centrist Reform	Katsuhito Nakajima	87,812	35.86	▼10.01
Sanseitō	Daisuke Suzuki	18,908	7.72	▲1.47
JCP	Seina Tanaka	9,959	4.07	▼1.33
Registered electors		416,468		
Turnout		244,847	59.57	▲2.88
LDP gain from Centrist Reform				

2024
Party	Candidate	Votes	%	±%
CDP	Katsuhito Nakajima	107,050	45.87	▼1.73
LDP	Shin'ichi Nakatani (elected by PR)	99,129	42.48	▼5.12
Sanseitō	Akihiro Takada	14,597	6,25	
JCP	Norifumi Sōda	12,601	5.40	
Registered electors		419,090		
Turnout		233,377	56.69	▼2.80
CDP gain from LDP				

2021
Party	Candidate	Votes	%	±%
LDP	Shin'ichi Nakatani	125,325	50.5	▲6.6
CDP	Katsuhito Nakajima (elected by PR)	118,223	47.6	▲3.3
Anti-NHK	Nobuyuki Henmi	4,826	1.9	
Turnout			59.49	▲1.99
LDP gain from CDP				

2017
Party	Candidate	Votes	%	±%
Independent	Katsuhito Nakajima	107,007	44.3	▲0.3
LDP	Shin'ichi Nakatani (elected by PR)	105,876	43.9	▲0.4
JCP	Gen Miyauchi	21,320	8.8	▼3.7
Happiness Realization	Ai Nishiwaki	7,119	3.0	
Turnout			57.50	▲1.24
Independent hold				

2014
Party	Candidate	Votes	%	±%
Democratic	Katsuhito Nakajima	102,111	44.0	▲23.7
LDP	Noriko Miyagawa (elected by PR)	101,026	43.5	▼0.1
JCP	Akiko Endō	29,125	12.5	▲4.0
Turnout			56.26	▼4.00
Democratic gain from LDP				

2012
Party	Candidate	Votes	%	±%
LDP – Kōmeitō	Noriko Miyagawa	54,930	43.6	new
JRP – YP	Sakihito Ozawa (elected by PR)	34,414	27.3	−32.9
DPJ – PNP	Tsuyoshi Saitō	26,070	20.7	new
JCP	Michitaka Uemura	10,694	8.5	new

2009
Party	Candidate	Votes	%	±%
DPJ	Sakihito Ozawa	91,422	60.2	+12.7
LDP – Kōmeitō	Masaaki Akaike	46,881	30.9	−13.3
JCP	Akiko Endō	11,972	7.9	−0.3
HRP	Hiroyuki Hayase	1,480	1.0	new

2005
Party	Candidate	Votes	%	±%
DPJ	Sakihito Ozawa	70,281	47.5	−7.4
LDP – Kōmeitō	Masaaki Akaike (elected by PR)	65,426	44.2	new
JCP	Akiko Endō	12,173	8.2	−2.2

2003
Party	Candidate	Votes	%	±%
DPJ	Sakihito Ozawa	71,623	54.9	+12.9
LDP	Kenzō Yoneda	45,282	34.7	new
JCP	Akiko Endō	13,545	10.4	+1.4

2000
Party	Candidate	Votes	%	±%
DPJ	Sakihito Ozawa	58,781	42.0	new
LDP	Eiichi Nakao	52,964	37.8	−1.1
Independent	Nobuaki Akaike	15,803	11.3	new
JCP	Akiko Endō	12,538	9.0	new

1996
Party	Candidate	Votes	%	±%
LDP	Eiichi Nakao	52,111	38.9	N/A
DPJ	Azuma Koshiishi	45,288	33.8	N/A
NFP	Hitoshi Gotō	25,265	18.9	N/A
JCP	Susumu Kogoshi	10,610	7.9	N/A
LL	Shigemoto Ishikawa	753	0.6	N/A
