= Shin Kanemaru =

Japanese politician

- 金丸 信
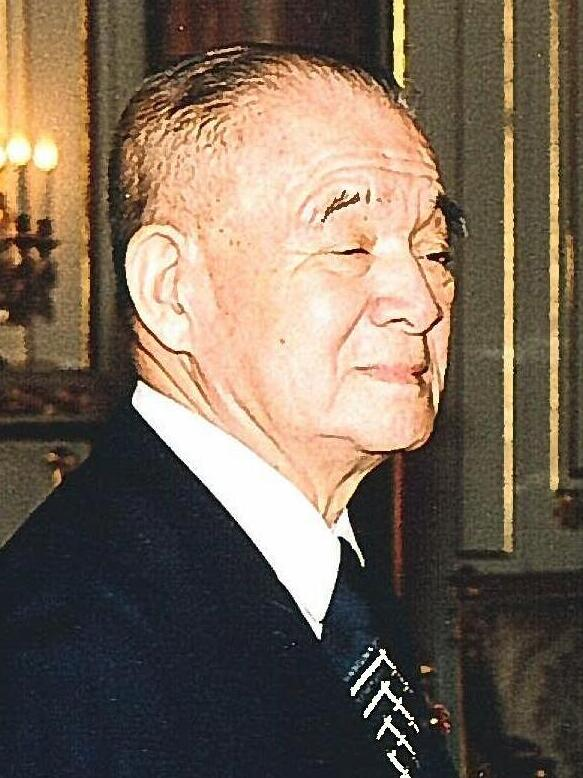
- Kanemaru in 1992

Deputy Prime Minister of Japan
- In office 22 July 1986 – 6 November 1987
- Prime Minister: Yasuhiro Nakasone
- Preceded by: Masayoshi Ito (1980)
- Succeeded by: Kiichi Miyazawa
Ministerial offices
Director-General of the Japan Defense Agency
In office 28 November 1977 – 7 December 1978
Prime Minister	Takeo Fukuda
Preceded by	Asao Mihara
Succeeded by	Ganri Yamashita
Director-General of the National Land Agency
In office 9 December 1974 – 15 September 1976
Prime Minister	Takeo Miki
Preceded by	Hyōsuke Niwa
Succeeded by	Kōsei Amano
Minister of Construction
In office 22 December 1972 – 25 November 1973
Prime Minister	Kakuei Tanaka
Preceded by	Takeo Kimura
Succeeded by	Takao Kameoka
Party political offices
Vice President of the Liberal Democratic Party
In office January 1992 – August 1992
President	Kiichi Miyazawa
Secretary-General	Tamisuke Watanuki
Preceded by	Susumu Nikaidō (1986)
Succeeded by	Keizō Obuchi (1994)
Secretary-General of the Liberal Democratic Party
In office October 1984 – July 1986
President	Yasuhiro Nakasone
Vice President	Susumu Nikaidō
Preceded by	Rokusuke Tanaka
Succeeded by	Noboru Takeshita

Member of the House of Representatives
- In office 23 May 1958 – 21 October 1992
- Preceded by: Toyohei Ogino
- Succeeded by: Mitsuo Horiuchi
- Constituency: Yamanashi at-large

Personal details
- Born: 17 September 1914 Nakakoma, Yamanashi, Japan
- Died: 28 March 1996 (aged 81) Shirane, Yamanashi, Japan
- Party: Liberal Democratic
- Education: Tokyo University of Agriculture

Military service
- Allegiance: Empire of Japan
- Branch/service: Imperial Japanese Army
- Years of service: 1938
- Unit: 2nd Company, Telegraph Triple Corps, Kwantung Army

Shin Kanemaru (金丸 信, Kanemaru Shin; 17 September 1914 – 28 March 1996) was a Japanese politician who was a significant figure in the political arena of Japan from the 1970s to the early 1990s. He was also Director General of the Japan Defense Agency from 1977 to 1978.

== Early life and career ==
Kanemaru was born in Suwa village (now Minami-arupusu city), Yamanashi Prefecture on 17 September 1914, to a moderately wealthy sake brewer family. His father was also involved in local politics. He attended the Tokyo University of Agriculture, but was more interested judo than academics. After graduating he became a taught biology and judo at a junior high school in Yamanashi Prefecture.

He was conscripted into the army and served briefly in the Kwantung Army in 1938. He was discharged due to illness and returned to Japan. After his military service, he entered into the sake brewing business and was later involved in the concrete and souvenir businesses. He was a member of the Liberal Democratic Party and a member of the faction of Noboru Takeshita.

=== Arrest and indictment ===
In 1992, he was indicted in the Sagawa Kyubin corruption scandal. He was charged with evading taxes on payments he had received from construction companies that were seeking political influence. He resigned and was arrested on 13 March 1993 after authorities found at least $51 million in bearer bonds and hundreds of pounds of gold stored at his home. The scandal was one of the contributors to the falling popularity of the ruling LDP that led to its defeat in the 1993 general elections.

== Personal life ==
He has a son, Shingo Shin. Kanemaru died in Yamanashi on 28 March 1996 at the age of 81.

House of Representatives (Japan)
Preceded by Kazuo Horiuchi, Toyohira Hagino, Shinichi Kobayashi, Takuo Furuya, Tsuneo Uchida (1955 general election)	Representative for Yamanashi at-large district 1958–1992; Served alongside: Kunio Tanabe, Eiichi Nakao, Mitsuo Horiuchi, Toshimasa Ueda, et al.	Succeeded by Kunio Tanabe, Toshimasa Ueda, Azuma Koshiishi, Eiichi Nakao (until 1993 general election)
Political offices
Preceded by Masayoshi Ito	Deputy Prime Minister of Japan; 1986–1987	Succeeded by Kiichi Miyazawa
Preceded by Asao Mihara	Director-General of the Japan Defense Agency; 1977–1978	Succeeded by Ganri Yamashita
Preceded by Hyosuke Niwa	Director-General of the National Land Agency; 1974–1976	Succeeded by Kosei Amano
Preceded by Takeo Kimura	Minister of Construction; 1972–1973	Succeeded by Takao Kameoka
Party political offices
Preceded by Susumu Nikaido	Vice President of the Liberal Democratic Party; 1992	Succeeded by Keizō Obuchi
Preceded by Rokusuke Tanaka	Secretary-General of the Liberal Democratic Party; 1984–1986	Succeeded by Noboru Takeshita
Preceded by Kichizō Hosoda	Chairman of the Executive Council, Liberal Democratic Party; 1983-1984	Succeeded by Kiichi Miyazawa
Preceded by Asao Mihara	Chairman of the Diet Policy Committee, Liberal Democratic Party; 1978-1980	Succeeded by Kichisō Tazawa
Preceded by Toshio Tsukahara	Chairman of the Diet Policy Committee, Liberal Democratic Party; 1971-1972	Succeeded by Ken Harada
