= Tomomi Otsuji =

Japanese politician (born 1981)

- 尾辻 朋実
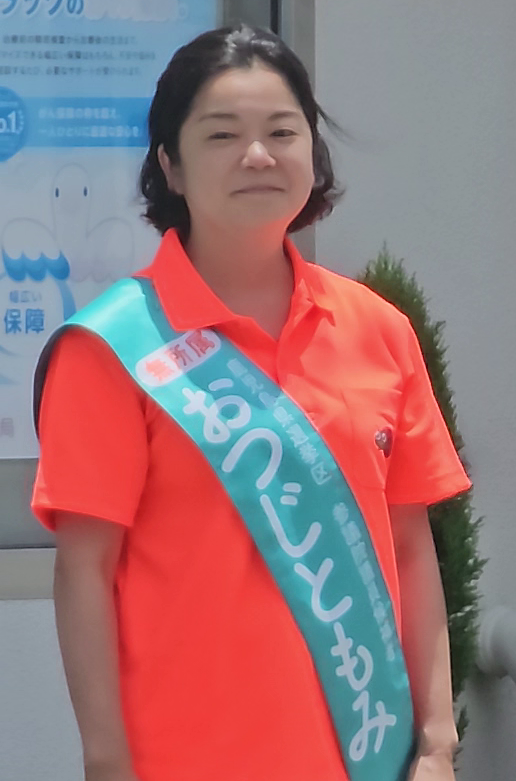
- Otsuji in 2025

Member of the House of Councillors
- Incumbent
- Assumed office 29 July 2025
- Preceded by: Hidehisa Otsuji
- Constituency: Kagoshima at-large

Personal details
- Born: Tomomi Otsuji; 17 January 1981 (age 45) Kagoshima, Japan
- Party: Independent (since 2024)
- Other political affiliations: LDP (until 2024)
- Parent: Hidehisa Otsuji (father)
- Education: Waseda University

Tomomi Otsuji (尾辻 朋実, Otsuji Tomomi; born 17 January 1981) is a Japanese politician. She is an independent member of the House of Councillors. She is the youngest daughter of former President of the House of Councillors, Hidehisa Otsuji.

She was supported by the Constitutional Democratic Party during her election.
