= Yamanashi at-large district =

Japan House of Councillors constituency

- 山梨県選挙区
- Parliamentary constituency for the House of Councillors
- Prefecture: Yamanashi
- Electorate: 685,381 (as of September 2022)

Current constituency
- Created: 1947
- Seats: 2
- Councillors: Class of 2022: Manabu Nagai（LDP） Class of 2025: Hitoshi Goto（DPP）

The Yamanashi at-large district (Japanese: 山梨県選挙区, Hepburn: Yamanashi-ken senkyoku) is a constituency that represents Yamanashi Prefecture in the House of Councillors in the Diet of Japan. It has two Councillors in the 248-member house.

== Outline ==
The constituency represents the entire population of Yamanashi Prefecture. The district elects two Councillors to six-year terms, one at alternating elections held every three years. The district has 692,001 registered voters as of September 2015. The Councillors currently representing Yamanashi are:

- Azuma Koshiishi (Democratic Party, third term; term ends in 2016.)

== Elected councillors ==
Class of 1947	election year	Class of 1950 (3-year term in 1947)
Tsunekichi Komiyama (Ind.) (Note: Later joined the Ryokufūkai)	1947	Shigeko Hirano (Socialist) (Note: Later became an independent.)
Tsunekichi Komiyama (Ind.)	1950	Taichi Hirabayashi (Ind.) (Note: Later joined the Liberal Democratic Party)
Hisatada Hirose (Ind.)	1953	Taichi Hirabayashi (Ind.)
Hisatada Hirose (Ind.)	1956	Katsuyasu Yoshie (LDP)
Toshio Yasuda (Socialist)	1959	Katsuyasu Yoshie (LDP)
Toshio Yasuda (Socialist)	1962	Katsuyasu Yoshie (LDP)
Hisatada Hirose (LDP)	1965	Katsuyasu Yoshie (LDP)
Hisatada Hirose (LDP)	1968	Katsuyasu Yoshie (LDP) (Note: Died in office 17 September 1970)
Hisatada Hirose (LDP)	1970 by-election (Note: Held 1 November 1970)	Jūji Hoshino (LDP)
Kiyoshi Kanzawa (Socialist)	1971	Jūji Hoshino (LDP)
Kiyoshi Kanzawa (Socialist)	1974	Taro Nakamura (LDP)
Keiyu Furuya (LDP)	1977	Taro Nakamura (LDP)
Keiyu Furuya (LDP)	1980	Taro Nakamura (LDP)
Tetsuro Shimura (LDP)	1983	Taro Nakamura (LDP)
Tetsuro Shimura (LDP)	1986	Taro Nakamura (LDP)
Osamu Isomura (Rengō no Kai)	1989	Taro Nakamura (LDP)
Osamu Isomura (Rengō no Kai)	1992	Tetsuro Shimura (LDP)
Mahito Nakajima (LDP)	1995	Tetsuro Shimura (LDP)
Mahito Nakajima (LDP)	1998	Azuma Koshiishi (Independent)
Mahito Nakajima (LDP)	2001	Azuma Koshiishi (Independent)
Mahito Nakajima (LDP)	2004	Azuma Koshiishi (DPJ)
Harunobu Yonenaga (DPJ)	2007	Azuma Koshiishi (DPJ)
Harunobu Yonenaga (DPJ)	2010	Azuma Koshiishi (DPJ)
Hiroshi Moriya (LDP)	2013	Azuma Koshiishi (DPJ)
Hiroshi Moriya (LDP)	2016	Yuka Miyazawa (DP)
Hiroshi Moriya (LDP)	2019	Yuka Miyazawa (DP)
Hiroshi Moriya (LDP)	2022	Manabu Nagai (LDP)

== Election results ==
2022
Party	Candidate	Votes	%	±%
LDP	Manabu Nagai	183,073	48.94	
CDP	Yuka Miyazawa (incumbent)	163,740	43.77	
Sanseitō	Tomohiko Watanabe	20,291	5.42	
Anti-NHK	Ichiro Kuroki	7,006	1.87	
Turnout				

2019
Party	Candidate	Votes	%	±%
LDP	Hiroshi Moriya (incumbent)	184,383	52.98	
Independent	Tomoko Ichiki	150,327	43.19	
Anti-NHK	Keiji Ino	13,344	3.83	
Turnout				

2016
Party	Candidate	Votes	%	±%
Democratic	Yuka Miyazawa	173,713	43.02	
LDP	Tsuyoshi Takano	152,437	37.75	
Independent	Harunobu Yonenaga	67,459	16.71	
Happiness Realization	Ai Nishiwaki	10,183	2.52	
Turnout				

2013
Party	Candidate	Votes	%	±%
LDP	Hiroshi Moriya	142,529	37.30	
Independent	Takehiro Sakaguchi	75,686	19.81	
Independent	Shigeki Aoki	61,834	16.18	
Your	Harunobu Yonenaga (incumbent)	58,750	15.38	
JCP	Akiko Endo	36,082	9.44	
Independent	Shozo Hayashi	3,969	1.04	
Happiness Realization	Jotaro Tanabe	3,220	0.84	
Turnout				

2010
Party	Candidate	Votes	%	±%
Democratic	Azuma Koshiishi (Incumbent)	187,010	43.02	
LDP	Noriko Miyagawa	183,265	42.16	
JCP	Hitoshi Hanada	32,274	7.43	
Independent	Naoyuki Nemoto	19,390	4.46	
Independent	Takashi Kigawa	12,721	2.93	
Turnout				

2007
Party	Candidate	Votes	%	±%
Democratic	Harunobu Yonenaga	242,586	55.34	
LDP	Kaname Irikura	162,746	37.13	
JCP	Hitoshi Hanada	32,994	7.53	
Turnout				

2004
Party	Candidate	Votes	%	±%
Democratic	Azuma Koshiishi (Incumbent)	231,631	55.09	
Independent	Kenshi Oshiba	155,949	37.09	
JCP	Hitoshi Hanada	32,845	7.53	
Turnout				

== See also ==
- List of districts of the House of Councillors of Japan
