= Hiroshi Moriya =

- 森屋 宏
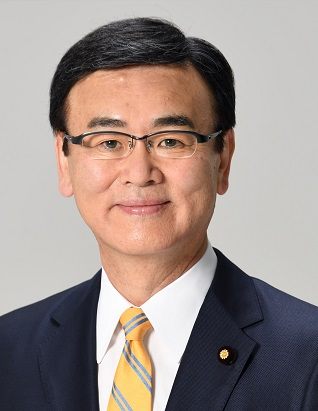
- Official portrait, 2019

Deputy Chief Cabinet Secretary (Political affairs, House of Councillors)
- In office 13 September 2023 – 1 October 2024
- Prime Minister: Fumio Kishida
- Preceded by: Yoshihiko Isozaki
- Succeeded by: Kazuhiko Aoki

Member of the House of Councillors
- In office 29 July 2013 – 28 July 2025
- Preceded by: Harunobu Yonenaga
- Succeeded by: Hitoshi Goto
- Constituency: Yamanashi at-large

Speaker of the Yamanashi Prefectural Assembly
- In office 9 October 2008 – 23 March 2010

Member of the Yamanashi Prefectural Assembly
- In office 1999 – 1 May 2013
- Constituency: Tsuru City & Nishikatsura Town

Personal details
- Born: 21 July 1957 (age 69) Tsuru, Yamanashi, Japan
- Party: Liberal Democratic
- Education: Hokkaido University

Hiroshi Moriya (森屋宏, Moriya Hiroshi; born July 21, 1957) is a Japanese politician who is a former member of the House of Councillors of Japan.

== Career ==
Moriya graduated from Hokkaido University of Education and worked at Himawari Kindergarten. In 1999, he was elected in Yamanashi Prefectural Assembly for 4 terms, serving as chair for 2 years.."List of the Members：House of Councillors". www.sangiin.go.jp. From 2008 to 2010, he was chair of the Yamanashi Prefectural Assembly. He ran in 2013, defeating incumbent Harunobu Yonenaga and former House of Representatives member Takehiro Sakaguchi.
