= Yoshito Kajiya =

Japanese politician (1938–2018)

- 加治屋 義人
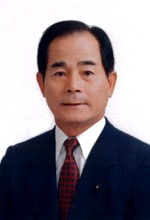

Member of the House of Councillors
- In office 29 July 2001 – 28 July 2013
- Preceded by: Kaname Kamada
- Succeeded by: Hidehisa Otsuji
- Constituency: Kagoshima at-large

Member of the Kagoshima Prefectural Assembly
- In office 1991–2001
- Constituency: Kagoshima City

Member of Kagoshima City Assembly
- In office 1976–1991

Personal details
- Born: 22 April 1938; Kagoshima City, Kagoshima, Japan
- Died: 12 November 2018 (aged 80)
- Political party: Liberal Democratic (Kōchikai)
- Awards: Grand Cordon, Order of the Rising Sun

Yoshito Kajiya (加治屋 義人, Kajiya Yoshito, April 22, 1938 – November 12, 2018) was a Japanese politician of the Liberal Democratic Party, a member of the House of Councillors in the Diet (national legislature). A native of Kagoshima, Kagoshima and high school graduate, he had served in the city assembly of Kagoshima for four terms since 1976. He was elected to the House of Councillors for the first time in 2001.
