= Noriko Miyagawa =

Japanese politician (1979–2019)

- 宮川 典子
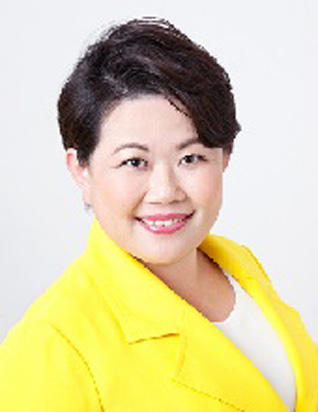
- Official portrait, 2017

Member of the House of Representatives; from Southern Kanto
- In office 18 December 2012 – 12 September 2019
- Preceded by: Sakihito Ozawa
- Succeeded by: Katsuhito Nakajima
- Constituency: Yamanashi 1st (2012–2014); PR block (2014–2019)

Personal details
- Born: 5 April 1979 Tokyo, Japan
- Died: 12 September 2019 (aged 40) Tokyo, Japan
- Party: Liberal Democratic (Shikōkai)
- Education: Keio University

Noriko Miyagawa (Japanese: 宮川 典子, Hepburn: Miyagawa Noriko; April 5, 1979 – September 12, 2019) was a Japanese politician. She was a member of the House of Representatives from 2012 until her death in 2019, and the Parliamentary Vice Minister of Education, Culture, Sports, Science and Technology in the Fourth Abe Cabinet.

== Early life and career ==
Miyagawa was born in Tokyo, Japan, but was raised in Yamanashi Prefecture. Her father owned a liquor store, while her mother was a high school English teacher; her maternal family ran a silk throwing business. Her grandfather was a school superintendent, and her younger brother and cousin were also teachers. Miyagawa lost her father to terminal cancer when she was 10 years old.

== Political career ==
In 2018, prefectural assembly members from the Liberal Democratic Party asked Miyagawa to run in the 2019 Yamanashi gubernatorial election, but she announced on October 2 that she would not be running.

On April 1, 2019, Miyagawa was hit by a car after getting off a taxi and was rushed to the hospital but was discharged on May 6 and resumed political activities. Having battled breast cancer since 2016, Miyagawa died on September 12, 2019, in a hospital in Tokyo. She was posthumously awarded the Senior Fifth Rank and the Order of the Rising Sun. Seiko Noda also gave a memorial speech at the plenary session of the House of Representatives on November 12.

== Political views ==
Miyagawa supported revision of the Constitution of Japan, particularly the state of emergency clause and the rights and obligations of citizens. She praised Abenomics, and also supported the introduction of the reduced consumption tax rate system. Miyagawa believed that the Murayama Statement and Kono Statement should be reexamined. She was also against legal regulation of hate speech. Miyagawa praised the Legislation for Peace and Security as well as the Act on Punishment of Organized Crimes and Regulation of Criminal Proceeds. She also supported an amendment to the Health Promotion Act to strengthen measures against passive smoking and served as the deputy secretary-general of the Parliamentary League for the Prevention of Passive Smoking but withdrew from the association in April 2017. Miyagawa also served as the secretary general on the special mission committee for the enactment of the LGBT Understanding Promotion Act.

== Works ==
- 漂流しはじめた日本の教育: 教育現場のデジタル化は誰のため? [Japanese Education That Began to Drift: Who Is Digitalizing the Educational Field For?]. Poplar. December 2013. ISBN 978-4591137413.
