= Hiroshi Moriyama =

Japanese politician

- 森山 𥙿
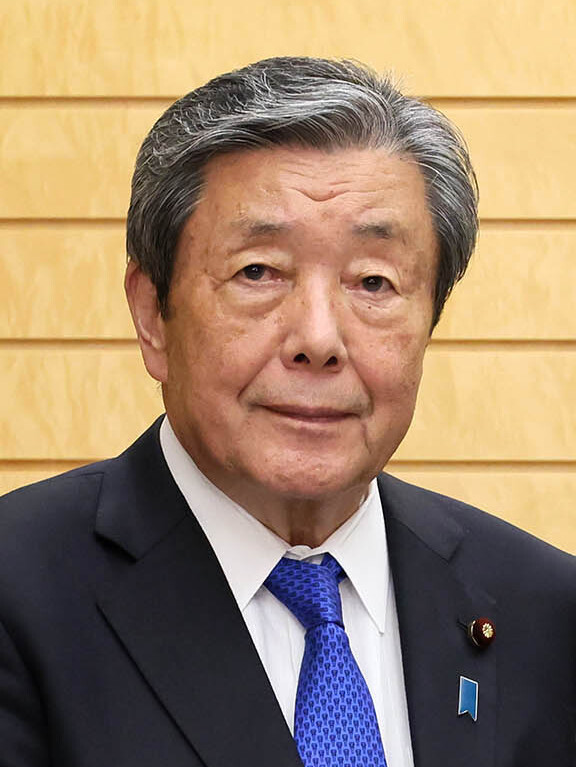
- Moriyama in 2024

Secretary-General of the Liberal Democratic Party
- In office 30 September 2024 – 7 October 2025
- President: Shigeru Ishiba
- Vice President: Yoshihide Suga
- Preceded by: Toshimitsu Motegi
- Succeeded by: Shun'ichi Suzuki

Minister of Agriculture, Forestry and Fisheries
- In office 7 October 2015 – 3 August 2016
- Prime Minister: Shinzo Abe
- Preceded by: Yoshimasa Hayashi
- Succeeded by: Yūji Yamamoto

Member of the House of Representatives
- Incumbent
- Assumed office 25 April 2004
- Preceded by: Sadanori Yamanaka
- Constituency: Kagoshima 5th (2004–2017); Kagoshima 4th (2017–present)

Member of the House of Councillors
- In office 26 July 1998 – 13 April 2004
- Preceded by: Kazuto Kamiyama
- Succeeded by: Tetsuro Nomura
- Constituency: Kagoshima at-large

Member of the Kagoshima City Council
- In office 28 April 1975 – 25 April 1998

Personal details
- Born: 8 April 1945 (age 81) Kanoya, Kagoshima, Japan
- Party: Liberal Democratic

Hiroshi Moriyama (森山 裕, Moriyama Hiroshi; born 8 April 1945) is a Japanese politician who served as Secretary-General of the Liberal Democratic Party from 2024 to 2025. He previously served as Minister of Agriculture, Forestry and Fisheries from 2015 to 2016. He was a member of the House of Councillors from 1998 to 2004 and has been a member of the House of Representatives since 2004.

A native of Kagoshima Prefecture, Moriyama served for many years on the Kagoshima City Council before entering national politics.

== Early life ==
Hiroshi Moriyama was born on April 8, 1945, in an air raid shelter in Kanoya, in Kagoshima Prefecture, due to allied air raids. His family ran a farm and a newsstand. As a boy, Moriyama worked as a paper boy for his family's newsstand, delivering newspapers on his bicycle everyday before school.

After graduating from junior high school he began to work in the automotive industry while attending high school part-time. He graduated in 1965. In 1969, Moriyama started a used car dealership.

== Political career ==
He entered politics in April 1975, when he was first elected to the Kagoshima City Council. He would be on the council for 23 years and served three times as chairman. He was considered close to Susumu Nikaido, a LDP heavyweight from Kagoshima Prefecture.

In July 1998, Moriyama was elected as a candidate of the Liberal Democratic Party (LDP) for the Kagoshima at-large district in the House of Councillors election. He would serve as parliamentary secretary for the Ministry of Finance from October 2002 to September 2003.

Shortly before the end of his term in April 2004, Moriyama resigned from the House of Councillors to run in a by-election in Kagoshima 5th district of the House of Representatives, caused by the death of Sadanori Yamanaka. Moriyama was elected with more than four-fifths of the votes. He opposed the privatization of the postal service pushed by Prime Minister Junichiro Koizumi. Due to this, he became one of the 33 so-called "postal rebels" who were denied LDP endorsement in the 2005 election, but easily defended his seat as an independent against an LDP "assassin" candidate.

Like many other postal rebels, Moriyama returned the LDP under Koizumi's successor Shinzo Abe in December 2006. In July 2007 he joined the Kinmirai Seiji Kenkyūkai faction led by Taku Yamasaki. In August of the same year he was appointed Senior Vice Minister of Finance and served as such until August 2008. Moriyama served as the Minister of Agriculture, Forestry and Fisheries in the cabinet of Shinzo Abe from October 2015 to August 2016.

In August 2017 Moriyama was appointed chairman of the Diet Affairs Committee in the LDP. He would serve in this post for more than four years, the longest ever tenure. Moriyama remained when Yoshihide Suga succeeded Abe. He was noted as a close ally of Suga and Secretary General Toshihiro Nikai. Moriyama left his position when Fumio Kishida succeeded Suga in October 2021.

In December of the same year Moriyama became head of the Kinmirai Seiji Kenkyūkai due to the defeat of the previous head Nobuteru Ishihara in the 2021 House of Representatives election. In August 2022 he was appointed chairman of the Election Strategy Committee in the LDP, putting him in charge of the difficult task of coordinating candidates after a recent redistricting. He served in this position until September 2023, when he was appointed chairman of the General Council.

After Shigeru Ishiba was elected to succeed Kishida as party president in September 2024, Moriyama was appointed Secretary-General of the Liberal Democratic Party. Due to his experience in diet affairs and ability to negotiate with opposition parties, Moriyama played a significant role in steering the LDP in its role as a parliamentary minority.

In January 2025, he became chairman of the Japan–China Friendship Parliamentarians' Union.

After the LDP-Komeito coalition was reduced to a minority in the July 2025 House of Councillors election, there were calls within the party for Ishiba and Moriyama to step down. In early September, after presenting a report on the election, Moriyama announced his intention to resign to take responsibility for the result.

Political offices
Preceded by Yoshimasa Hayashi	Minister of Agriculture, Forestry and Fisheries; 2015–2016	Succeeded by Yūji Yamamoto
Party political offices
Preceded by Wataru Takeshita	Chairman of the Diet Affairs Committee, Liberal Democratic Party; 2017–2021	Succeeded by Tsuyoshi Takagi
Preceded by Nobuteru Ishihara	Head of the Kinmirai Seiji Kenkyūkai; 2021–2024	Faction disbanded
Preceded by Toshiaki Endo	Chairman of the Election Strategy Committee, Liberal Democratic Party; 2022–2023	Succeeded by Yuko Obuchi
Preceded by Toshiaki Endo	Chairman of the General Council, Liberal Democratic Party; 2023–2024	Succeeded by Shun'ichi Suzuki
Preceded by Toshimitsu Motegi	Secretary-General of the Liberal Democratic Party; 2024–2025	Succeeded by Shun'ichi Suzuki
