= Tetsuro Nomura =

Japanese politician

Tetsurō Nomura
- 野村 哲郎
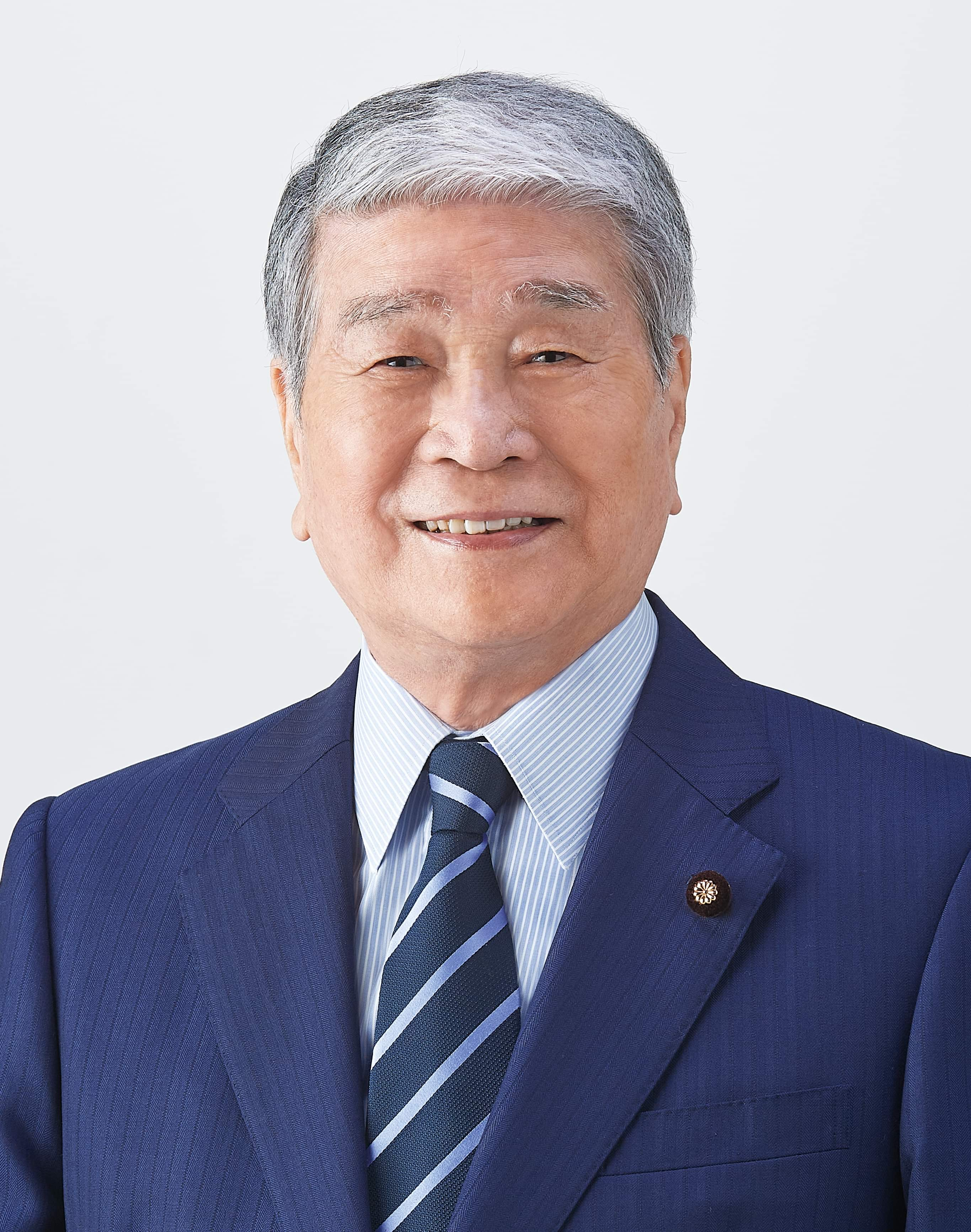
- Official portrait, 2022

Minister of Agriculture, Forestry and Fisheries
- In office 10 August 2022 – 13 September 2023
- Prime Minister: Fumio Kishida
- Preceded by: Genjirō Kaneko
- Succeeded by: Ichiro Miyashita

Member of the House of Councillors
- Incumbent
- Assumed office 11 July 2004
- Preceded by: Hiroshi Moriyama
- Constituency: Kagoshima at-large

Personal details
- Born: 20 November 1943 (age 82) Hayato, Kagoshima, Japan
- Party: Liberal Democratic
- Education: Japanese La Salle Academy

Tetsuro Nomura (野村 哲郎, Nomura Tetsuro; born November 20, 1943) is a Japanese politician of the Liberal Democratic Party, a member of the House of Councillors in the Diet (national legislature). A native of Hayato, Kagoshima and high school graduate, he was elected for the first time in 2004.

== Political career ==
In August 2023 Nomura drew criticism from within his own party, for characterising treated water released from Fukushima No. 1 nuclear power plant as "contaminated water". Amidst pressure, Nomura later apologized for his remarks claiming it was a slip of the tongue.

On September 13, 2023 Prime Minister Fumio Kishida ordered a cabinet reshuffle that saw Nomura lose his position as Minister of Agriculture, Forestry, and Fisheries.

After Shinjirō Koizumi replaced Taku Etō as the Minister of Agriculture, Forestry, and Fisheries in May 2025, Nomura drew heavily backlash from the internet after complaining about Shinjiro refusing to follow the tradition in a meeting.
