= Ken Harada (politician) =

Japanese politician

- 原田 憲
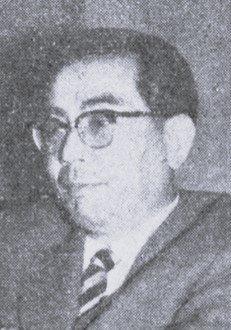
- Harada in 1962

Director-General of the Economic Planning Agency
- In office 27 December 1988 – 25 January 1989
- Prime Minister: Noboru Takeshita
- Preceded by: Eiichi Nakao
- Succeeded by: Kōichirō Aino

Minister of Posts and Telecommunications
- In office 25 November 1973 – 11 November 1974
- Prime Minister: Kakuei Tanaka
- Preceded by: Chūji Kuno
- Succeeded by: Toshio Kashima

Minister of Transport
- In office 30 November 1968 – 14 January 1970
- Prime Minister: Eisaku Satō
- Preceded by: Yasuhiro Nakasone
- Succeeded by: Tomisaburō Hashimoto

Member of the House of Representatives
- In office 22 June 1980 – 27 September 1996
- Preceded by: Mikio Ōmi
- Succeeded by: Constituency abolished
- Constituency: Osaka 3rd
- In office 22 May 1958 – 7 September 1979
- Preceded by: Ryōji Inoue
- Succeeded by: Hiromu Murakami
- Constituency: Osaka 3rd
- In office 19 April 1953 – 24 January 1955
- Preceded by: Mitsuzō Ōkawa
- Succeeded by: Tatsunosuke Takasaki
- Constituency: Osaka 3rd
- In office 26 April 1947 – 23 December 1948
- Preceded by: Constituency established
- Succeeded by: Tadao Asaka
- Constituency: Osaka 3rd

Personal details
- Born: 12 February 1919 Ikeda, Osaka, Japan
- Died: 29 January 1997 (aged 77) Ikeda, Osaka, Japan
- Party: Liberal Democratic
- Other political affiliations: JLP (1945–1948); DLP (1948–1950); LP (1950–1955)
- Children: Kenji Harada
- Education: Meiji University

Ken Harada (原田 憲, Harada Ken; 12 February 1919 – 29 January 1997) was a member of the Diet of Japan from the Liberal Democratic Party until resigning his office on 24 January 1989 following alleged involvement in the Recruit scandal, where Harada admitted Recruit had given him donations, in the form of seasonal summer gifts, for ten years. While the donations were not illegal, they raised questions of political ethics which eventually led Harada to resign. As a member of the Diet, Harada served as Director-General of the Economic Planning Agency, and earned the close trust of Prime Minister Noboru Takeshita. He was the third minister to resign over the scandal. Harada had been appointed to direct the Economic Planning Agency only one month before his resignation. After party officials had already placed him as the chair of a committee in charge of investigating the Recruit stock scandal, where he had concluded that nothing illegal had taken place. In 1992, Harada backed Keizō Obuchi as new leader of the Liberal Democratic Party. Kōichirō Aino replaced Harada as Minister of Economic Planning.

== Scouting ==
Harada served as a member of the National Board of Governors of the Boy Scouts of Nippon and President of the Scout Parliamentary Caucus. In 1989, Harada was awarded the 200th Bronze Wolf, the only distinction of the World Organization of the Scout Movement, awarded by the World Scout Committee for exceptional services to world Scouting. In 1985 he also received the highest distinction of the Scout Association of Japan, the Golden Pheasant Award.

== Bibliography ==
- Associated Press (26 January 1989). "Takeshita: He'll stay, seek trust". The Register-Guard. Guard.
- Associated Press (24 January 1989). "3rd Japan official resigns in stock scandal". Deseret News.
- Chira, Susan (25 January 1989). "Scandal Fells Another Japanese Official". The New York Times.
- Hartcher, Peter (25 January 1989). "Recruit scandal claims senior Cabinet Minister". The Sydney Morning Herald.
- Hayes, Louis (2004). Introduction to Japanese Politics (illustrated ed.). M.E. Sharpe. ISBN 0-7656-1338-7.
- Hoshii, Iwao (1993). Japan's Pseudo-Democracy. Routledge. ISBN 1-873410-07-7.
- "Japan stock scandal: Third cabinet minister resigns". The Gainesville Sun. The New York Times Company. 25 January 1989.
- Schoenberger, Karl (1 January 1989). "Fund-raising ethics". Manila Standard.
- United Press International (13 February 1989). "More arrests made in stock scandal". Ellensburg Daily Record.
- Vilaró, Ramón (25 January 1989). "El escándalo de Recruit se cobra otro ministro japonés: Dimite el titular de Planificación Económica". El País (in Spanish).
- Dr. László Nagy, 250 Million Scouts, The World Scout Foundation and Dartnell Publishers, 1985, complete list through 1981

House of Representatives (Japan)
Preceded by Ihei Ochi	Chair, Committee on Transport of the House of Representatives; 1982–1983	Succeeded by Toshiichi Fuke
Preceded by Shun Ōide	Chair, Committee on Discipline of the House of Representatives; 1993–1996	Succeeded by Keiwa Okuda
Political offices
Preceded by Yasuhiro Nakasone	Minister of Transport; 1968–1970	Succeeded by Tomisaburō Hashimoto
Preceded by Chūji Kuno	Minister of Posts and Telecommunications; 1973–1974	Succeeded by Toshio Kashima
Preceded by Eiichi Nakao	Director-General of the Economic Planning Agency; 1988–1989	Succeeded by Kōichirō Aino
Party political offices
Preceded by Shin Kanemaru	Chair, Diet Affairs Committee of the Liberal Democratic Party; 1972–1973	Succeeded by Hajime Fukuda
