= Tadahiko Shimazu =

Japanese politician (1899–1980)

Tadahiko Shimadzu
- 島津 忠彦
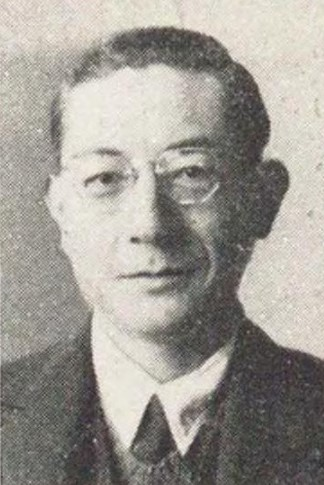
- Shimazu in 1946

Member of the House of Councillors
- In office 3 May 1947 – 3 June 1956
- Preceded by: Constituency established
- Succeeded by: Kaku Shigenari
- Constituency: Kagoshima at-large

Member of the House of Peers
- In office 10 July 1939 – 2 May 1947 Hereditary peerage

Personal details
- Born: 30 August 1899 Kagoshima, Japan
- Died: 12 May 1980 (aged 80)
- Party: Liberal Democratic
- Other political affiliations: Independent (1947–1950); Liberal (1950–1955)
- Education: Seikei Business School

Tadahiko Shimazu (島津 忠彦, Shimazu Tadahiko; 30 August 1899 – 12 May 1980) or Tadahiko Shimadzu (Shimadzu Tadahiko) was a Japanese politician who served as a member of the National Diet.

== Early life and education ==
He was born in Kagoshima City, Kagoshima Prefecture and was born to the House of Shigetomi of the Shimadzu clan. His father is Baron Shimazu Sounosuke. Tadahiko became a baron by succession in 1925. Tadahiko’s younger brother Hisamoto Katō was a yōga painter.

Tadahiko learned at Kagoshima Prefectural Daini-Kagoshima Middle School (鹿児島県立第二鹿児島中学校; now Kagoshima Prefectural Konan High School) and Seikei Business School (成蹊実業専門学校; now Seikei University). He graduated from Seikei Business School in 1923 and worked at Mitsubishi Bank for about ten years. Then he served as the president of several companies.

== Political career ==
He was elected to a member of the House of Peers of the Imperial Diet from barons in 1939 and he served until 1947 when the House of Peers was abolished. After World War II, he was elected to a member of House of Councillors of the National Diet from Kagoshima at-large district in 1947 election and 1950 election. He was initially an independent member and later belonged to the Liberal Party and then the Liberal Democratic Party. He served as the Chairs of the Committee on telecommunications of the House of Councillors.
