= Kagoshima at-large district =

Japan House of Councillors constituency

- 鹿児島県選挙区
- Parliamentary constituency for the House of Councillors
- Prefecture: Kagoshima
- Electorate: 1,319,420 (as of September 2022)

Current constituency
- Created: 1947
- Seats: 2
- Councillors: Class of 2025: Tomomi Otsuji (CDP); Class of 2022: Tetsuro Nomura (LDP)

Kagoshima at-large district is a constituency in the House of Councillors of Japan, the upper house of the Diet of Japan (national legislature). It currently elects two members to the House of Councillors, one per election. It has, historically, similar to other 2-seat, rural prefectures, been an LDP stronghold. The last opposition member elected was before the House of Councilor seat reform, when the JSP elected a candidate in 1995. The closest any party has come to defeating the LDP in the district since was 2007, when Ino Minayoshi lost by only three thousand votes. However, LDP candidates in the district have typically been kept below 50%, mainly due to LDP-infighting; Shuji Maeda took 15% of the vote in the district in 2019, which kept Otsuji below 50%, and in 2022, Ayumi Saigo took a similar amount of the vote, leading to Nomura receiving just under 50% again.

== Outline ==
The constituency represents the entire population of Kagoshima Prefecture and has 1,369,874 registered voters as of September 2015.

As of 2025, the current representatives are:

- Tomomi Otsuji, first elected in 2025. Up for election in 2031. Member of the Constitutional Democratic Party.
- Tetsuro Nomura, first elected in 2004. Up for election in 2022. Member of the Liberal Democratic Party.

== Elected members ==
People in this district elected the following members of the House of Councillors.

- Inokichi Chuman - 1947 (nonparty)
- Kichinosuke Saigo - 1947 (nonparty), 1953 (LP), 1959 (LDP), 1965 (LDP)
- Kizaemon Ueno V - 1947 fill-in member (nonparty)
- Tadahiko Shimadzu - 1947 fill-in member (nonparty), 1950 (LP)
- Kiichiro Maenosono - 1947 by-election (DP)
- Yoshito Okamoto - 1947 by-election (nonparty)
- Tadataka Sata - 1950 (JSP), 1956 (JSP), 1962 (JSP)
- Tomoharu Inoue - 1953 (LP)
- Kaku Shigenari - 1956 (LDP)
- Shigeho Tanaka (politician) - 1956 by-election (LDP), 1962 (LDP), 1968 (LDP)
- Keikichi Taniguchi - 1959 (LDP), 1965 (LDP)
- Tameji Kawakami - 1968 (LDP)
- Yoshifumi Shibatate - 1971 (LDP)
- Tetsuo Tsuruzono - 1971 (JSP)
- Kichio Inoue - 1974 (LDP), 1980 (LDP), 1986 (LDP), 1992 (LDP), 1998 (LDP)
- Wataru Kubo - 1974 (JSP), 1983 (JSP), 1989 (JSP), 1995 (JSP)
- Souji Sata - 1975 by-election (LDP)
- Saburo Kanemaru - 1977 (LDP), 1983 (LDP)
- Takeo Tahara - 1977 (nonparty)
- Shinjiro Kawahara - 1980 (LDP), 1986 (LDP)
- Kaname Kamada - 1989 (LDP), 1995 (LDP)
- Kazuto Kamiyama - 1992 (JSP)
- Hiroshi Moriyama - 1998 (LDP)
- Yoshito Kajiya - 2001 (LDP), 2007 (LDP)
- Tetsuro Nomura - 2004 (LDP), 2010 (LDP), 2016 (LDP)
- Hidehisa Otsuji - 2013 (LDP), 2019 (LDP)
- Tetsuro Nomura - 2022 (LPD), 2025 (LPD)
- Tomomi Otsuji - 2025 (CDP)

== See also ==
- List of districts of the House of Councillors of Japan
