= Harunobu Yonenaga =

Japanese politician (1965–2026)

- 米長 晴信

Member of the House of Councillors
- In office 29 July 2007 – 28 July 2013
- Preceded by: Mahito Nakajima
- Succeeded by: Hiroshi Moriya
- Constituency: Yamanashi at-large

Personal details
- Born: 21 October 1965 Masuho, Yamanashi, Japan
- Died: 16 June 2026 (aged 60)
- Party: Independent (2012–2013; 2014–2026)
- Other political affiliations: Democratic (2007–2012); Your Party (2013–2014)
- Education: Sophia University

Harunobu Yonenaga (米長 晴信, Yonenaga Harunobu) (21 October 1965 – 16 June 2026) was a Japanese politician of the Democratic Party of Japan, a member of the House of Councillors in the Diet (national legislature). A graduate of Sophia University, he was elected to the House of Councillors for the first time in 2007, after working at Fuji Television for 17 years. He died on 16 June 2026, at the age of 60.
