= Masaaki Yamazaki =

Japanese politician (1942–2026)

- 山崎 正昭
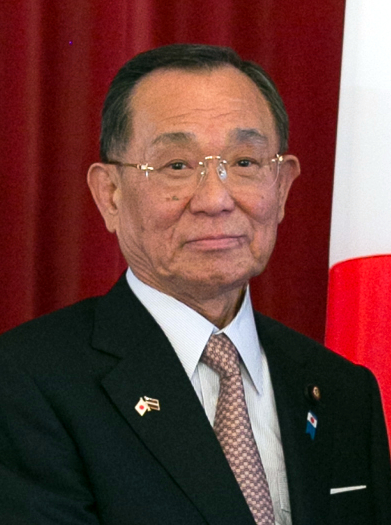
- Yamazaki in 2014

President of the House of Councillors
- In office 2 August 2013 – 25 July 2016
- Monarch: Akihito
- Vice President: Azuma Koshiishi
- Preceded by: Kenji Hirata
- Succeeded by: Chūichi Date

Vice President of the House of Councillors
- In office 26 December 2012 – 2 August 2013
- President: Kenji Hirata
- Preceded by: Hidehisa Otsuji
- Succeeded by: Azuma Koshiishi

Deputy Chief Cabinet Secretary (Political affairs, House of Councillors)
- In office 22 September 2003 – 31 October 2005
- Prime Minister: Junichiro Koizumi
- Preceded by: Kōsei Ueno
- Succeeded by: Seiji Suzuki

Member of the House of Councillors
- In office 26 July 1992 – 13 November 2026
- Preceded by: Tasaburō Kumagai
- Constituency: Fukui at-large

Speaker of the Fukui Prefectural Assembly
- In office May 1991 – March 1992

Member of the Fukui Prefectural Assembly
- In office April 1979 – June 1992

Member of the Ōno City Council
- In office February 1975 – February 1979

Personal details
- Born: 24 May 1942 Ōno, Fukui, Japan
- Died: 13 November 2026 (aged 84)
- Party: Liberal Democratic
- Education: Nihon University

Masaaki Yamazaki (山崎 正昭, Yamazaki Masaaki; 24 May 1942 – 13 November 2026) was a Japanese politician who served as President of the House of Councillors from 2013 to 2016. A member of the Liberal Democratic Party, he served as a member of the House of Councillors in the National Diet from 1992 till his death in 2026.

== Career ==
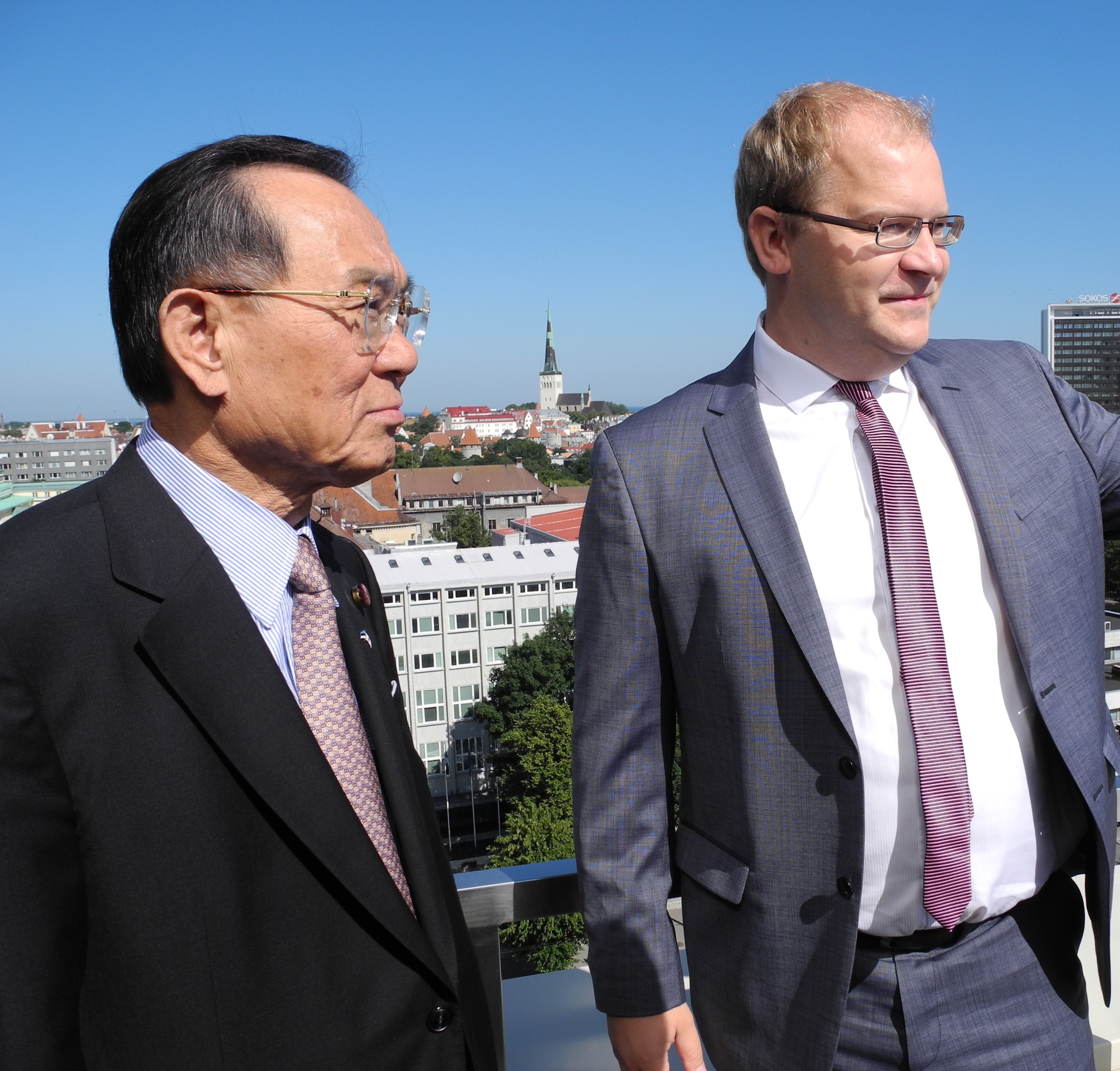
Yamazaki with Urmas Paet in 2014

A native of Nishitani-mura in Ōno, Fukui, Yamazaki graduated the Nihon University School of Law.

Yamazaki served in the city assembly of Ōno for one term since 1975 and then in the assembly of Fukui Prefecture for four terms since 1979. He was elected to the House of Councillors for the first time in 1992.

He also served as Parliamentary Secretary for Finance in the Hashimoto Cabinet, Deputy Secretary-General of LDP, Deputy Chief Cabinet Secretary in the Koizumi Cabinet, and Secretary-General for the LDP in the House of Councillors.

== Political positions ==
On 21 April 2014, Yamazaki sent a ritual offering to Yasukuni Shrine, with a wooden sign showing "President of the House of Councillors Masaaki Yamazaki" next to the one with "Prime Minister Shinzō Abe".

Like Abe, Yamazaki was in favor of the revision of the constitution.

Both Yamazaki and Abe were affiliated with the openly revisionist lobby Nippon Kaigi, which supports visits and tributes to this controversial shrine, and a restoration of monarchy and militarism.

Yamazaki was a member of the following right-wing Diet groups:

- Nippon Kaigi Diet discussion group (日本会議国会議員懇談会 - Nippon kaigi kokkai giin kondankai)
- Diet Celebration League of the 20th Anniversary of His Majesty The Emperor's Accession to the Throne (天皇陛下御即位二十年奉祝国会議員連盟)
- Conference of parliamentarians on the Shinto Association of Spiritual Leadership (神道政治連盟国会議員懇談会 - Shinto Seiji Renmei Kokkai Giin Kondankai) - NB: SAS a.k.a. Sinseiren, Shinto Political League

== Death ==
Yamazaki died on 13 November 2026, at the age of 84. At the time of his death, he was the oldest sitting member of the House of Councillors.

== Honours ==
- Netherlands: Knight Grand Cross of the Order of Orange-Nassau (29 October 2014)

== Sources ==
- 政治家情報 〜山崎 正昭〜. www.senkyo.janjan.jp (in Japanese). JANJAN.
