= Hidehisa Otsuji =

Japanese politician (born 1940)

- 尾辻 秀久
- Official portrait, 2004

President of the House of Councillors
- In office 3 August 2022 – 11 November 2024
- Monarch: Naruhito
- Vice President: Hiroyuki Nagahama
- Preceded by: Akiko Santō
- Succeeded by: Masakazu Sekiguchi

Vice President of the House of Councillors
- In office 30 July 2010 – 26 December 2012
- President: Takeo Nishioka; Kenji Hirata
- Preceded by: Akiko Santō
- Succeeded by: Masaaki Yamazaki

Minister of Health, Labour and Welfare
- In office 27 September 2004 – 31 October 2005
- Prime Minister: Junichiro Koizumi
- Preceded by: Chikara Sakaguchi
- Succeeded by: Jirō Kawasaki

Member of the House of Councillors
- In office 24 July 1989 – 28 July 2025
- Preceded by: Multi-member district
- Succeeded by: Tomomi Otsuji
- Constituency: National PR (1989–2013); Kagoshima at-large (2013–2025)

Member of the Kagoshima Prefectural Assembly
- In office 1979–1986

Personal details
- Born: 2 October 1940 (age 86) Kaseda, Kagoshima, Japan
- Party: Liberal Democratic
- Children: 3, including Tomomi Otsuji
- Education: University of Tokyo

Hidehisa Otsuji (尾辻 秀久, Otsuji Hidehisa; born 2 October 1940) is a Japanese politician who served as the President of the House of Councillors from 2022 to 2024. A member of the Liberal Democratic Party, he has been a member of the House of Councillors since 1989, serving as Vice President of the House of Councillors from 2010 to 2012 and as Minister of Health, Labour and Welfare from 2004 to 2005.

== Early life and education ==
He was born on October 2, 1940, in Minamisatsuma. During the Pacific War, his father, Shuichi, was a lieutenant commander in the Imperial Japanese Navy and captain of the destroyer Yūgiri. In 1943, he went down with the ship in the Battle of Cape St. George.

Otsuji briefly attended the National Defense Academy but dropped out in 1961 to support his sister after their mother died. He later attended the prestigious University of Tokyo, but again dropped out.

From his own account, Otsuji was unhappy with university education. Reflecting on his youth as en elderly politician, he noted the social unrest at the time and protests against the government of Prime Minister Kishi, and said that lectures were rarely held and there was no worthwhile education to be had. Instead, he took the time to travel the world and visited close to 80 countries over a period of five years. In 1971, he returned to Japan and officially withdrew from Tokyo University and returned to Kagoshima.

== Political career ==
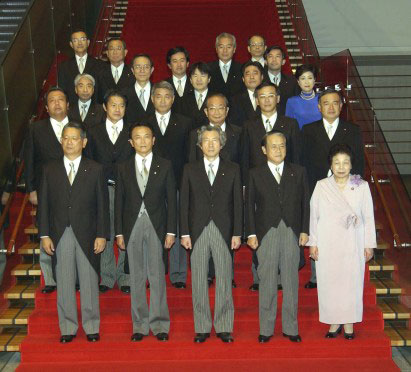
Otsuji in the Koizumi Cabinet, 27 September 2004.

Resolving to become a politician, Otsuji was elected to the Kagoshima Prefectural Assembly in 1979. He was defeated in his run for the House of Representatives in 1986 but was elected to the House of Councillors in 1989.

He served as Parliamentary Vice Minister in the Management and Coordination Agency in 1992, Parliamentary Vice Minister in the Okinawa Development Agency in 1994 and Senior Vice Minister of Finance in 2001. In 2004, he was appointed Minister of Health, Labour and Welfare in the cabinet of Prime Minister Junichirō Koizumi, serving as such until 2005.

Otsuji was elected Vice President of the House of Councillors following the 2010 House of Councillors election. In December 2012, he resigned to become President of the Japan War-Bereaved Families Association and served as such until 2014.

In August 2022, Otsuji was elected President of the House of Councillors.

Otsuji is affiliated to the conservative organization Nippon Kaigi.

Otsuji is also the author of several books, including "Africa Travel Diary" and "Going to Bokemon World." "Bokemon" is a word from the Kagoshima dialect of Japanese meaning "recklessly strong".

Senate
Preceded by 50-member district	Member of the House of Councillors by proportional representation 1989–2013	Succeeded by 48-member district
Preceded by Yoshito Kajiya	Member of the House of Councillors from Kagoshima; 2013–present	Incumbent
Preceded by Masakazu Yamamoto	Chairman of the Committee on Health and Welfare; 1998–1999	Succeeded by Yasu Kano
Preceded by Kiyoko Ono	Chairman of the Budget Committee; 2006–2007	Succeeded by Yoshitada Konoike
Preceded by Akiko Santo	Vice President of the House of Councillors; 2010–2012	Succeeded by Masaaki Yamazaki
Preceded by Akiko Santo	President of the House of Councillors; 2022–2024	Succeeded by Masakazu Sekiguchi
Political offices
Preceded by Chikara Sakaguchi	Minister of Health, Labour and Welfare of Japan; 2004–2005	Succeeded by Jirō Kawasaki
Party political offices
Preceded by Mikio Aoki	Chairman of the Liberal Democratic Party in the House of Councillors; 2007–2010	Succeeded by Hirofumi Nakasone
