= Akiko Santō =

Japanese politician (born 1942)

- 山東 昭子
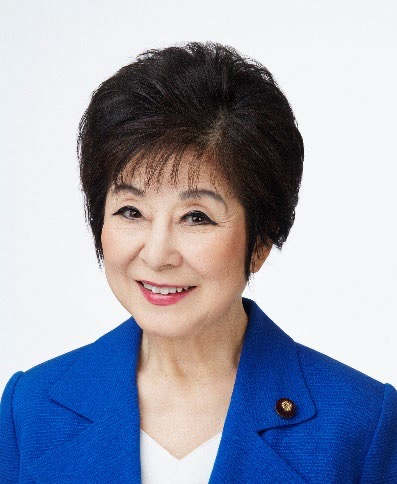

President of the House of Councillors
- In office 1 August 2019 – 3 August 2022
- Monarch: Naruhito
- Vice President: Toshio Ogawa
- Preceded by: Chūichi Date
- Succeeded by: Hidehisa Otsuji

Vice President of the House of Councillors
- In office 7 August 2007 – 30 July 2010
- President: Satsuki Eda
- Preceded by: Akira Imaizumi
- Succeeded by: Hidehisa Otsuji

Director-General of Science and Technology Agency
- In office 29 December 1990 – 5 November 1991
- Prime Minister: Toshiki Kaifu
- Preceded by: Tomoji Ōshima
- Succeeded by: Kanzō Tanigawa

Member of House of Councillors
- In office 29 July 2001 – 28 July 2025
- Constituency: National PR
- In office 25 August 1995 – 2 October 1996
- Preceded by: Tetsuo Tanabe
- Succeeded by: Hitoshi Shimasaki
- Constituency: National PR
- In office 7 July 1974 – 7 July 1992
- Constituency: National district (1974–1986); National PR (1986–1992)

Personal details
- Born: 11 May 1942 (age 84) Setagaya, Tokyo, Japan
- Party: Liberal Democratic
- Education: Bunka Gakuin

Akiko Santō (山東 昭子, Santō Akiko; born 11 May 1942) is a Japanese politician who served as President of the House of Councillors from 2019 to 2022. A member of the Liberal Democratic Party, she was previously the vice president of the House of Councillors from 2007 to 2010.

== Background and career ==
Akiko Santō was born in Setagaya, Tokyo, on 11 May 1942. She was the grandniece of Kodama Ryōtarō (1872 – 1921), who served in the House of Representatives during the Taishō era. On the recommendation of the composer Ikuma Dan, a friend of her mother, Santo became the host of a TBS Radio children's program at the age of eleven. She graduated from Bunka Gakuin in 1961.

Santo was elected to the House of Councillors for the first time in 1974 after working as an actress and reporter. She was parliamentary vice-minister of environment (Ohira cabinet), and minister of state and director general of the Science and Technology Agency (Kaifu cabinet, 1990–91). She became vice president of the House of Councillors in 2007, and chaired the joint plenary meeting of party members of both houses of the Diet.

After the 2019 election, Santo was elected President of the House of Councillors. She stepped down after the 2022 election.

== The Senkaku episode ==
Santo played a role in the sale of three of the Senkaku Islands. She had known the landowner (Kurihara family) for 30 years, and in 2011 he told her that he wanted to sell to the governor of Tokyo, Shintaro Ishihara (whose nationalistic book he liked), instead of to the government and the prime minister, Yoshihiko Noda. The latter proposed a land swap, the former cash, and eventually the state bought the land for $25.5 million in 2012.
