= Katsuhito Nakajima =

Japanese politician (born 1967)

- 中島 克仁

Member of the House of Representatives; from Southern Kanto
- In office 16 December 2012 – 23 January 2026
- Preceded by: Multi-member district
- Succeeded by: Shinichi Nakatani
- Constituency: PR block (2012–2014); Yamanashi 1st (2014–2021); PR block (2021–2024); Yamanashi 1st (2024–2026)

Personal details
- Born: 27 September 1967 (age 59) Kōfu, Yamanashi, Japan
- Party: CRA (since 2026)
- Other political affiliations: Your Party (2012–2014); DPJ (2014–2016); DP (2016–2017); Independent (2017–2021); CDP (2021–2026)
- Parent: Mahito Nakajima (father)
- Education: University of Tokyo
- Occupation: Doctor, Politician

Katsuhito Nakajima is a Japanese former politician who served as a member of the House of Representatives of Japan.

== Biography ==
Nakajima studied in School of Medicine, Tokyo University, and worked as a doctor in multiple hospitals. He was elected in 2012.
