= Shinichi Nakatani =

Japanese politician (born 1976)

- 中谷 真一
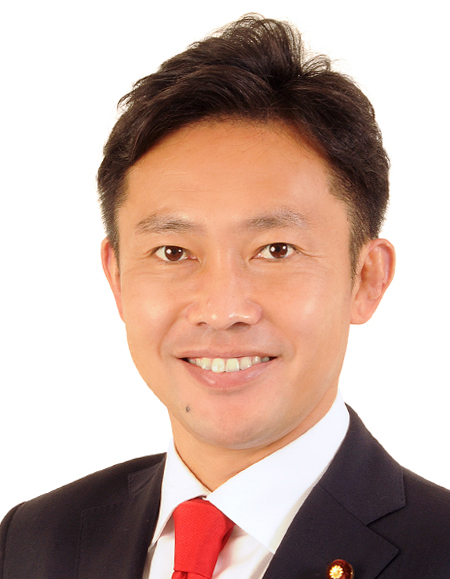
- Official portrait, 2022

Member of the House of Representatives; from Southern Kanto
- Incumbent
- Assumed office 18 December 2012
- Constituency: PR block (2012–2021); Yamanashi 1st (2021–2024); PR block (2024–2026); Yamanashi 1st (2026–present)

Personal details
- Born: 30 September 1976 (age 50) Neyagawa, Osaka, Japan
- Party: Liberal Democratic
- Education: National Defense Academy

Military service
- Allegiance: Japan
- Branch/service: Japan Ground Self-Defense Force
- Years of service: 2000–2010
- Rank: Captain

Shinichi Nakatani (中谷真一, Nakatani Shinichi; born 30 September 1976) is a Japanese politician serving as a member of the House of Representatives since 2012. From 2022 to 2023, he served as State Minister of Economy, Trade and Industry and State Minister of the Cabinet Office.
