= Mitsuo Horiuchi =

Japanese politician (1930–2016)

- 堀内 光雄
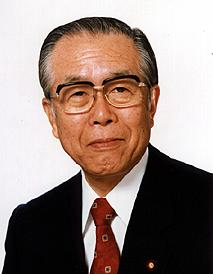
- Official portrait, 1997

Minister of International Trade and Industry
- In office 11 September 1997 – 30 July 1998
- Prime Minister: Ryutaro Hashimoto
- Preceded by: Shinji Satō
- Succeeded by: Kaoru Yosano

Minister of Labour
- In office 3 June 1989 – 10 August 1989
- Prime Minister: Sōsuke Uno
- Preceded by: Hyōsuke Niwa
- Succeeded by: Jōji Fukushima

Member of the House of Representatives; from Yamanashi
- In office 19 July 1993 – 21 July 2009
- Preceded by: Shin Kanemaru
- Succeeded by: Takehiro Sakaguchi
- Constituency: At-large district (1993–1996); 2nd district (1996–2009)
- In office 11 December 1976 – 24 January 1990
- Preceded by: Tokushige Kanamaru
- Succeeded by: Azuma Koshiishi
- Constituency: At-large district

Personal details
- Born: 1 January 1930 Misaka, Yamanashi, Japan
- Died: 16 May 2016 (aged 86) Tokyo, Japan
- Party: Liberal Democratic
- Education: Keio University

Mitsuo Horiuchi (Japanese: 堀内 光雄, Hepburn: Horiuchi Mitsuo; 1 January 1930 – 16 May 2016) was a Japanese politician of the Liberal Democratic Party, a member of the House of Representatives in the Diet (national legislature). A native of Misaka, Yamanashi and graduate of Keio University, he was elected to the House of Representatives for the first time in 1976. He joined Sosuke Uno's cabinet as the Minister of Labour.

Party political offices
Preceded by Kōichi Katō	Head of Kōchikai faction 2001–2006	Succeeded by Makoto Koga
