= President of the Senate (Japan) =

Japanese government entity

- 参議院議長
- Senate Emblem

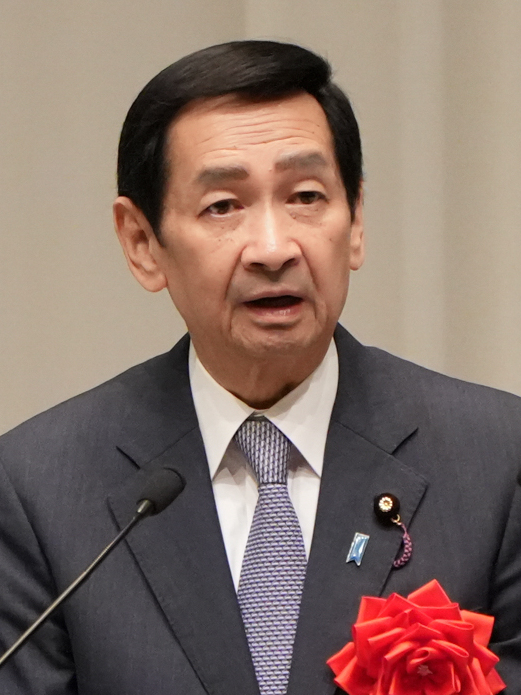
- Incumbent; Masakazu Sekiguchi since 11 November 2024
- Senate (Japan)
- Style: Mr President (informal); The Right Honourable (formal); His Excellency (Respect)
- Type: Presiding Officer Head of Legislative Branch
- Member of: Senate (Japan) National Diet
- Residence: The President's Official Residence
- Seat: Tokyo
- Appointer: Senate (Japan)
- Term length: Three years; renewable once
- Constituting instrument: Constitution of Japan
- Formation: May 20, 1947; 79 years ago
- First holder: Tsuneo Matsudaira
- Deputy: Vice President of the Senate (Japan)

The president of the Senate (参議院議長, Sangiin-gichō) is the presiding officer of the Senate, the upper house of Japan, and together with the Speaker of the House of Representatives, the president is also the head of the legislative branch of Japan. The president is elected by members of the Senate at the start of each session, and can serve two three-year terms, for a maximum of six years.

The current president of the Senate is Masakazu Sekiguchi, who took office on 11 November 2024.

== Selection ==
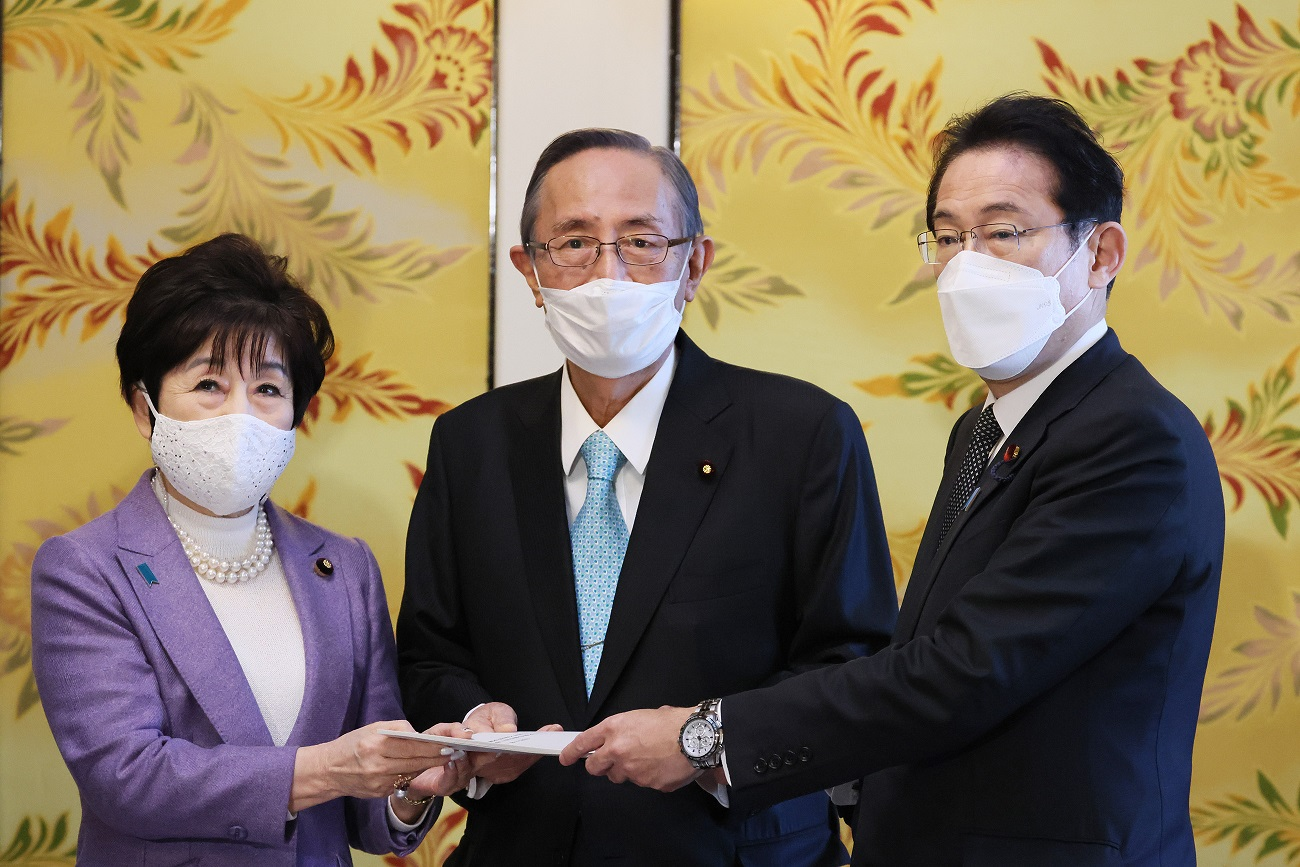
President Akiko Santo with House Speaker Hiroyuki Hosoda and Prime Minister Fumio Kishida on 12 January 2022

The election of the president takes place on the day of the new session, under the moderation of the secretary-general of the Senate. The president is elected by an anonymous vote, and must have at least half of the votes in order to take office. If no one gets over half of the votes, the top two candidates will be voted again, and if they get the same number of votes, the president is elected by a lottery. The vice president is elected separately, in the same way.

Usually, the president is a senior member of the ruling party, and the vice president is a senior member of the opposition party. The current president, Masakazu Sekiguchi, is a member of the ruling Liberal Democratic Party, while the vice president, Tetsuro Fukuyama, is a member of the Constitutional Democratic Party of Japan.

== Powers and duties ==
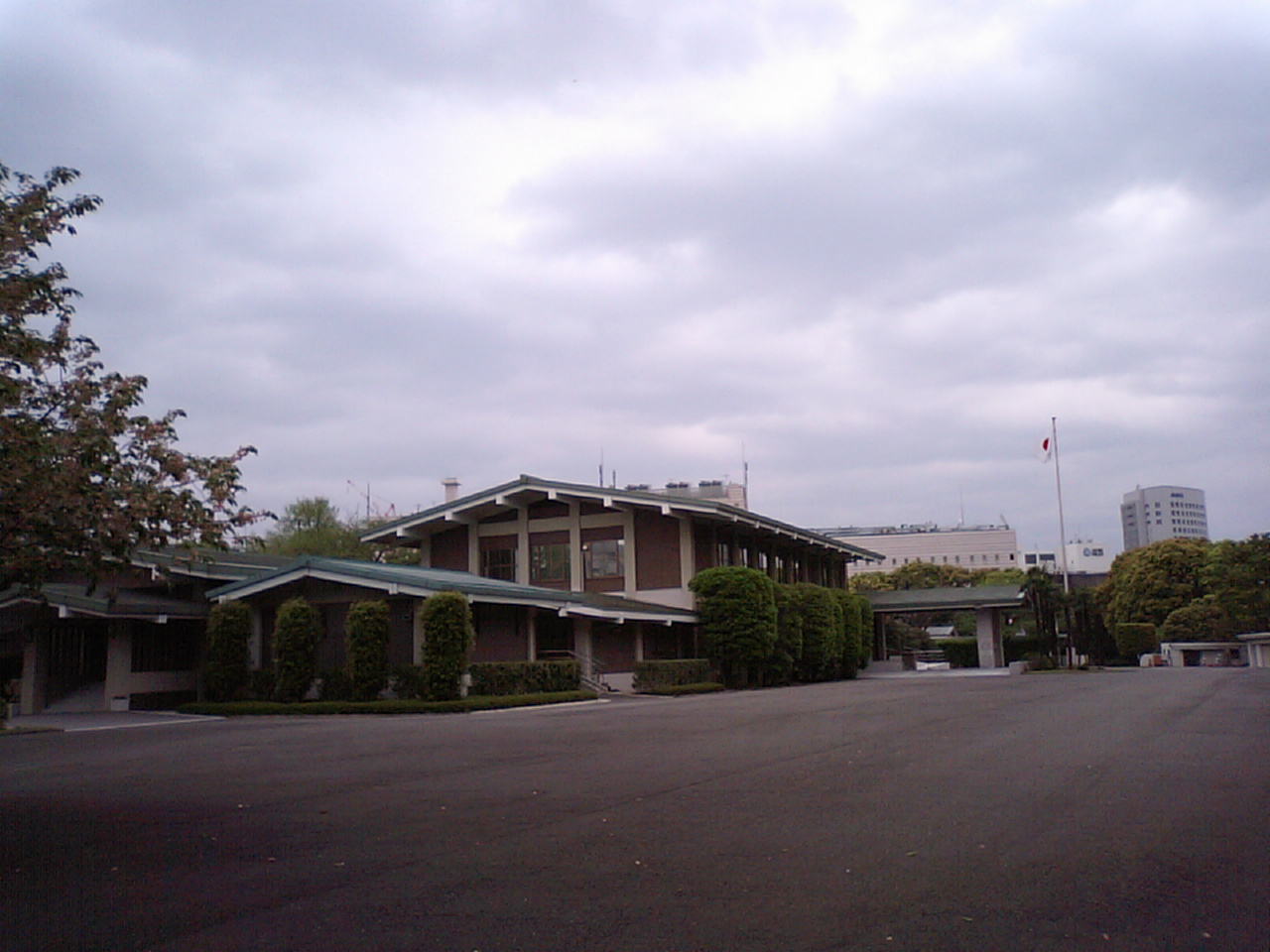
The residence of the president of the Senate (Sangiin gichō kōtei) in Nagatachō, Chiyoda ward, Tokyo is mainly used for official occasions such as reception of state guests. The residence of the vice president is located in Azabu-Nagasakachō in Minato ward.

According to Chapter III Article 19 of the Diet Law, the president "shall maintain order in the Senate, arrange its business, supervise its administration, and represent it as a whole".

The president is also authorized to maintain order in the senatorial chambers by exercising police power. Upon the president's request, police personnel are sent by the National Police Agency, and are placed under the president's direction. The president may then order arrest or removal of either a senator or a visitor to the chambers.

According to Chapter XIV Chapter 116 of the Diet law, when a Senator acts in a disorderly manner while it is in session, the president can warn them or make them withdraw their statements. If the Senator does not obey these orders, the president can forbid the member to speak or make the member leave the chamber until the end of the proceedings. If the chamber goes out of control and becomes over chaotic, the president may also temporarily suspend or adjourn the session in question for the day.

== List of presidents of the Senate ==
Portrait	Name Office (Lifespan)	Term of office			Party
Portrait	Name Office (Lifespan)	Took office	Left office	Duration	Party
	Tsuneo Matsudaira 松平 恒雄; Councillor for Fukushima (1877–1949)	20 May 1947	14 November 1949	2 years, 179 days	Ryokufūkai
	Naotake Satō 佐藤 尚武; Councillor for Aomori (1882–1971)	15 November 1949	19 May 1953	3 years, 186 days	Ryokufūkai
	Yahachi Kawai 河井 彌八; Councillor for Shizuoka (1877–1960)	19 May 1953	3 April 1956	2 years, 321 days	Ryokufūkai
	Tsuruhei Matsuno 松野 鶴平; Councillor for Kumamoto (1883–1962)	3 April 1956	6 August 1962	6 years, 126 days	Liberal Democratic
	Yūzō Shigemune 重宗 雄三; Councillor for National (1894–1976)	6 August 1962	17 July 1971	8 years, 346 days	Liberal Democratic
	Kenzō Kōno 河野 謙三; Councillor for Kanagawa (1901–1983)	17 July 1971	3 July 1977	5 years, 352 days	Liberal Democratic
	Ken Yasui 安井 謙 Councillor for Tokyo (1911–1986)	28 July 1977	7 July 1980	2 years, 346 days	Liberal Democratic
	Masatoshi Tokunaga 徳永 正利; Councillor for National (1913–1990)	17 July 1980	9 July 1983	2 years, 358 days	Liberal Democratic
	Mutsuo Kimura 木村 睦男; Councillor for Okayama (1913–2001)	18 July 1983	22 July 1986	3 years, 5 days	Liberal Democratic
	Masaaki Fujita 藤田 正明; Councillor for Hiroshima (1922–1996)	22 July 1986	30 September 1988	2 years, 71 days	Liberal Democratic
	Yoshihiko Tsuchiya 土屋 義彦; Councillor for Saitama (1926–2008)	30 September 1988	4 October 1991	3 years, 5 days	Liberal Democratic
	Yūji Osada 長田 裕二; Councillor for National PR (1917–2003)	4 October 1991	9 July 1992	280 days	Liberal Democratic
	Bunbē Hara 原 文兵衛; Councillor for Tokyo (1913–1999)	7 August 1992	22 July 1995	2 years, 350 days	Liberal Democratic
	Jūrō Saitō 斎藤 十朗; Councillor for Mie (1940–2025)	4 August 1995	19 October 2000	5 years, 77 days	Liberal Democratic
	Yutaka Inoue 井上 裕 Councillor for Chiba (1927–2008)	19 October 2000	22 April 2002	1 year, 186 days	Liberal Democratic
	Hiroyuki Kurata 倉田 寛之; Councillor for Chiba (1938–2020)	22 April 2002	30 July 2004	2 years, 100 days	Liberal Democratic
	Chikage Oogi 扇 千景; Councillor for National PR (1933–2023)	30 July 2004	28 July 2007	2 years, 364 days	Liberal Democratic
	Satsuki Eda 江田 五月; Councillor for Okayama (1941–2021)	28 July 2007	25 July 2010	2 years, 363 days	Democratic
	Takeo Nishioka 西岡 武夫; Councillor for National PR (1936–2011)	30 July 2010	5 November 2011	1 year, 99 days	Democratic
	Kenji Hirata 平田 健二; Councillor for Gifu (born 1944)	14 November 2011	28 July 2013	1 year, 257 days	Democratic
	Masaaki Yamazaki 山崎 正昭; Councillor for Fukui (1942–2026)	2 August 2013	25 July 2016	2 years, 359 days	Liberal Democratic
	Chūichi Date 伊達 忠一; Councillor for Hokkaido (born 1939)	1 August 2016	28 July 2019	2 years, 362 days	Liberal Democratic
	Akiko Santō 山東 昭子; Councillor for National PR (born 1942)	1 August 2019	3 August 2022	3 years, 3 days	Liberal Democratic
	Hidehisa Otsuji 尾辻 秀久; Councillor for Kagoshima (born 1940)	3 August 2022	11 November 2024	2 years, 101 days	Liberal Democratic
	Masakazu Sekiguchi 関口 昌一; Councillor for Saitama (born 1953)	11 November 2024	Incumbent	2 years, 8 days	Liberal Democratic

== List of vice presidents of the Senate ==
Portrait	Name Office (Lifespan)	Term of office			Party
Portrait	Name Office (Lifespan)	Took office	Left office	Duration	Party
	Jiichirō Matsumoto 松本 治一郎; Councillor for National (1887–1966)	20 May 1947	24 February 1949	1 year, 281 days	Socialist
	Kisaku Matsushima 松嶋 喜作; Councillor for National (1891–1977)	26 March 1949	2 May 1950	1 year, 38 days	Democratic Liberal
	Jirō Miki 三木 治朗; Councillor for Kanagawa (1885–1963)	12 July 1950	2 May 1953	2 years, 295 days	Socialist
	Yūzō Shigemune 重宗 雄三; Councillor for National (1894–1976)	19 May 1953	9 May 1956	2 years, 357 days	Liberal
	Yutaka Terao 寺尾 豊 Councillor for Kochi (1898–1972)	9 May 1956	12 June 1958	2 years, 35 days	Liberal Democratic
	Tarō Hirai 平井 太郎; Councillor for Kagawa (1905–1973)	16 June 1958	7 July 1962	4 years, 22 days	Liberal Democratic
	Yōtoku Shigemasa 重政 庸徳; Councillor for National (1895–1977)	6 August 1962	1 June 1965	2 years, 300 days	Liberal Democratic
	Kenzō Kōno 河野 謙三; Councillor for Kanagawa (1901–1983)	30 July 1965	3 August 1968	3 years, 5 days	Liberal Democratic
	Ken Yasui 安井 謙 Councillor for Tokyo (1911–1986)	3 August 1968	17 July 1971	2 years, 349 days	Liberal Democratic
	Yasoichi Mori 森 八三一; Councillor for National (1899–1990)	17 July 1971	7 July 1974	2 years, 356 days	Liberal Democratic
	Kazuo Maeda 前田 佳都男; Councillor for Wakayama (1910–1978)	27 July 1974	28 July 1977	3 years, 2 days	Liberal Democratic
	Kan Kase 加瀬 完 Councillor for Chiba (1910–1995)	28 July 1977	30 August 1979	2 years, 34 days	Socialist
	Chōzō Akiyama 秋山 長造; Councillor for Okayama (1917–2010)	30 August 1979	9 July 1983	3 years, 314 days	Socialist
	Noboru Agune 阿具根 登 Councillor for National (1912–2004)	18 July 1983	7 July 1986	2 years, 355 days	Socialist
	Hideyuki Seya 瀬谷 英行; Councillor for Saitama (1919–2008)	22 July 1986	7 August 1989	3 years, 17 days	Socialist
	Akira Ono 小野 明 Councillor for Fukuoka (1920–1990)	7 August 1989	19 April 1990	256 days	Socialist
	Ippei Koyama 小山 一平; Councillor for Nagano (1914–2011)	25 April 1990	7 July 1992	2 years, 74 days	Socialist
	Misao Akagiri 赤桐 操 Councillor for Chiba (1920–2010)	7 August 1992	4 August 1995	2 years, 363 days	Socialist
	Misao Akagiri 松尾 官平; Councillor for Aomori (1927–2013)	4 August 1995	25 July 1998	2 years, 356 days	New Frontier
	Hisamitsu Sugano 菅野 久光; Councillor for Hokkaido (1928–2006)	30 July 1998	22 July 2001	2 years, 358 days	Democratic
	Shōji Motooka 本岡 昭次; Councillor for Hyōgo (1931–2017)	7 August 2001	25 July 2004	2 years, 354 days	Democratic
	Giichi Tsunoda 角田 義一; Councillor for Gunma (1937–2024)	30 July 2004	30 January 2007	2 years, 185 days	Democratic
	Akira Imaizumi 今泉 昭 Councillor for Chiba (1934–2021)	30 January 2007	28 July 2007	180 days	Democratic
	Akiko Santō 山東 昭子; Councillor for National PR (born 1942)	7 August 2007	30 July 2010	2 years, 358 days	Liberal Democratic
	Hidehisa Otsuji 尾辻 秀久; Councillor for National PR (born 1940)	30 July 2010	16 December 2012	2 years, 140 days	Liberal Democratic
	Masaaki Yamazaki 山崎 正昭; Councillor for Fukui (1942–2026)	16 December 2012	2 August 2013	230 days	Liberal Democratic
	Azuma Koshiishi 輿石 東 Councillor for Yamanashi (born 1936)	2 August 2013	25 July 2016	2 years, 359 days	Democratic
	Akira Gunji 郡司 彰 Councillor for Ibaraki (born 1949)	1 August 2016	1 August 2019	3 years, 1 day	Democratic
	Toshio Ogawa 小川 敏夫; Councillor for Tokyo (born 1948)	1 August 2019	3 August 2022	3 years, 3 days	Constitutional Democratic
	Hiroyuki Nagahama 長浜 博行; Councillor for Chiba (born 1958)	3 August 2022	1 August 2025	2 years, 364 days	Constitutional Democratic
	Tetsuro Fukuyama 福山 哲郎; Senator for Kyoto (born 1962)	1 August 2025	Incumbent	1 year, 110 days	Constitutional Democratic
