= Shōmei Yokouchi =

Japanese politician (1942–2020)

- 横内 正明
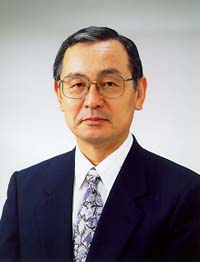
- Official portrait, 1997

Governor of Yamanashi Prefecture
- In office 17 February 2007 – 16 February 2015
- Monarch: Akihito
- Preceded by: Takahiko Yamamoto
- Succeeded by: Hitoshi Goto

Member of the House of Representatives; from Yamanashi
- In office 19 July 1993 – 16 December 2002
- Preceded by: Katsuhiko Tanaka
- Succeeded by: Takeshi Hosaka
- Constituency: At-large district (1993–1996); 3rd district (1996–2002)

Personal details
- Born: 2 March 1942 Nirasaki, Yamanashi, Japan
- Died: 21 April 2020 (aged 78) Kōfu, Yamanashi, Japan
- Party: Independent
- Other political affiliations: Liberal Democratic
- Education: University of Tokyo

Shōmei Yokouchi (横内 正明, Yokouchi Shōmei; 2 March 1942 – 21 April 2020) was a Japanese politician. He represented the Yamanashi at-large district and later the Yamanashi 3rd district in the House of Representatives in the national Diet from 1993 until 2002 and was governor of Yamanashi Prefecture from 2007 until 2015. He was a graduate of the University of Tokyo Law Department.

Political offices
Preceded by	Governor of Yamanashi; 2007–2015	Succeeded by Hitoshi Goto
