= Yamanashi at-large district (House of Representatives) =

Electoral district in Japan

The Yamanashi at-large district (Japanese: 山梨県全県区, Hepburn: Yamanashi-ken Zenken-ku) was a multi-member electoral district represented in the House of Representatives in the National Diet of Japan. From 1947 until 1993, it elected five representatives from Yamanashi Prefecture.

== History ==
In the 1947 Japanese general election, the Liberal Party and Japan Socialist Party won two seats each with Hisashi Amano, from the conservative Democratic, being the only candidate from other parties to win a seat. In the 1949 Japanese general election, all three conservative candidates retained their seats, and in the 1952 Japanese general election conservative candidates held three of the five seats.

After winning only two seats in the 1953 Japanese general election, they regained their majority in the 1955 Japanese general election by winning three seats, and in 1958 Japanese general election, the Liberal Democratic Party (LDP), which was formed from many of the conservative parties which had held seats in Yamanashi, won four out of five seats. Subsequently, the LDP and their conservative allies would win a majority of seats in every election afterwards until the district's dissolution. Due to the 1994 Japanese electoral reform, the at-large district was replaced with three single-member districts starting with the 1996 Japanese general election.

At the time the Public Offices Election Law came into law in 1950, the district encompassed the entirely of Yamanashi Prefecture.

Among the district's representatives were director-general of the Japan Defense Agency Shin Kanemaru, Minister of the Environment Sakihito Ozawa, and governor of Yamanashi Prefecture Shōmei Yokouchi.

== Results ==
1947
Party	Candidate	Votes	%	±%
Democratic	Hisashi Amano	43,723	15.0	New
Socialist	Hajime Matsuzawa	43,647	15.0	New
Liberal	Masafumi Suzuki	39,197	13.5	New
Socialist	Rikizō Hirano	38,916	13.4	New
Liberal	Senzō Higai	38,245	13.1	New
Other	Jirō Usui	29,082	10.0	New
Democratic	Jūji Kasai	27,498	9.5	New
Democratic	Kenzō Akiyama	16,304	5.6	New
JCP	Yuki Yukie	11,133	3.8	New
National Cooperative	Tsutomu Furuya	2,663	0.9	New
Independent	Noriji Iketani	562	0.2	New

1949
Party	Candidate	Votes	%	±%
Democratic Liberal	Senzō Higai	41,745	12.7	New
Democratic Liberal	Masafumi Suzuki	38,661	11.8	New
Democratic	Hisashi Amano	35,823	10.9	−4.1
JCP	Yoshimori Fukazawa	31,695	9.7	5.9
Independent	Shin'ichi Kobayashi	27,403	8.3	New
Socialist	Nagao Ono	26,284	8.0	−7.0
Democratic Liberal	Eitarō Yamada	22,475	6.8	New
Japan Social Reform Party	Hajime Matsuzawa	21,848	6.7	New
Democratic	Kenzō Akiyama	21,528	6.6	−2.9
Independent	Jūji Kasai	18,698	5.7	New
Independent	Ryūhei Suzuki	16,671	5.1	New
Socialist	Sadao Furuya	14,794	4.5	−8.9
Independent	Kazuyoshi Onozaki	8,154	2.5	New
Pro-American Labor Party	Tadashi Fujimoto	1,353	0.4	New
National Cooperative	Tsutomu Furuya	1,138	0.3	−0.6

1952
Party	Candidate	Votes	%	±%
Liberal	Katsuyasu Yoshie	48,909	13.8	New
Japan Cooperative Party (1952)	Rikizō Hirano	47,183	13.3	New
Liberal	Tsuneo Uchida	44,297	12.5	New
Independent	Toyohei Ogino	43,117	12.1	New
Left Socialist	Sadao Furuya	40,103	11.3	New
Kaishintō	Shin'ichi Kobayashi	39,836	11.2	New
Liberal	Masafumi Suzuki	38,262	10.8	New
Kaishintō	Shigeji Hoshino	31,329	8.8	New
JCP	Yoshimori Fukazawa	11,060	3.1	−6.6
Independent	Gen'ichi Iketani	10,992	3.1	New
Other	Takayoshi Kamei	506	0.1	New

1953
Party	Candidate	Votes	%	±%
Left Socialist	Sadao Furuya	53,710	15.1	3.8
Kaishintō	Kikuo Furuya	53,561	15.0	New
Independent	Shin'ichi Kobayashi	47,986	13.5	New
Right Socialist	Rikizō Hirano	40,727	11.4	New
Liberal	Masafumi Suzuki	38,939	10.9	−2.9
Liberal	Tsuneo Uchida	38,314	10.7	−1.8
Independent	Toyohei Ogino	37,922	10.6	−1.5
Liberal	Katsuyasu Yoshie	33,863	9.5	−1.3
Independent	Jūji Kasai	10,751	3.0	New
Independent	Fumiyoshi Horiuchi	648	0.2	New

1955
Party	Candidate	Votes	%	±%
Democratic	Kazuo Horiuchi	58,036.4	16.1	New
Democratic	Toyohei Ogino	56,735	15.8	New
Independent	Shin'ichi Kobayashi	45,568	12.7	−0.8
Left Socialist	Sadao Furuya	43,983	12.2	−2.9
Liberal	Tsuneo Uchida	41,741	11.6	0.7
Liberal	Masafumi Suzuki	32,759	9.1	−1.6
Left Socialist	Toshio Yasuda	31,367	8.7	New
National Farmers Union	Rikizō Hirano	20,794	5.8	New
Independent	Hisako Tsushima	19,858	5.5	New
Independent	Shin'ichirō Hirabayashi	4,312	1.2	New
Right Socialist	Usaburō Shimura	3,184	0.9	−10.5
Independent	Fumiyoshi Horiuchi	1,816.6	0.5	0.3

1958
Party	Candidate	Votes	%	±%
LDP	Shin Kanemaru	69,354.92	17.8	5.6
Socialist	Tokushige Kanamaru	55,480.03	14.3	New
LDP	Kazuo Horiuchi	53,812.52	13.8	5.1
LDP	Kunio Tanabe	46,377	11.9	New
LDP	Tsuneo Uchida	45,431	11.7	New
Independent	Shin'ichi Kobayashi	33,810	8.7	−4.0
Socialist	Sadao Furuya	30,612	7.9	New
Independent	Masafumi Suzuki	18,030	4.6	New
LDP	Toyohei Ogino	17,957	4.6	New
Independent	Rikizō Hirano	10,840	2.8	New
JCP	Yuki Yukie	5,742	1.5	New
Japan National Agricultural Party	Fumiyoshi Horiuchi	1,670.44	0.4	New

1960
Party	Candidate	Votes	%	±%
LDP	Shin Kanemaru	71,435.51	18.5	0.7
LDP	Kazuo Horiuchi	61,430.55	15.9	2.1
LDP	Tsuneo Uchida	59,522	15.4	3.5
Socialist	Shin'ichi Kobayashi	51,007	13.2	−1.1
LDP	Kunio Tanabe	50,711	13.1	1.4
Socialist	Tokushige Kanamaru	45,366.43	11.7	3.8
Socialist	Sadao Furuya	39,834	10.3	New
JCP	Yuki Yukie	5,525	1.4	−0.1
Japan National Agricultural Party	Fumiyoshi Horiuchi	1,495.4	0.4	0.0

1963
Party	Candidate	Votes	%	±%
Socialist	Tokushige Kanamaru	76,008.31	19.4	6.2
LDP	Tsuneo Uchida	70,824	18.1	−0.4
LDP	Kazuo Horiuchi	64,821.75	16.5	0.6
LDP	Shin Kanemaru	62,206.63	15.9	2.8
LDP	Kunio Tanabe	62,112	15.9	0.5
Socialist	Shin'ichi Kobayashi	50,492	12.9	1.2
JCP	Yoshiyuki Hiraide	4,054	1.0	−0.4
Japan National Agricultural Party	Fumiyoshi Horiuchi	1,194.2	0.3	−0.1

1967
Party	Candidate	Votes	%	±%
Socialist	Shin'ichi Kobayashi	77,495	18.9	−0.5
LDP	Shin Kanemaru	71,339.11	17.4	−0.7
Socialist	Tokushige Kanamaru	66,849.82	16.3	3.4
LDP	Tsuneo Uchida	65,635	16.0	−0.5
Independent	Eiichi Nakao	52,530	12.8	New
LDP	Tetsuo Tanaka	51,029	12.4	−3.5
Independent	Rikizō Hirano	17,317	4.2	New
JCP	Yoshiyuki Hiraide	5,754	1.4	0.4
Japan National Agricultural Party	Fumiyoshi Horiuchi	1,676	0.4	0.1
Independent	Hiroyoshi Sugimoto	647	0.2	New

1969
Party	Candidate	Votes	%	±%
LDP	Tsuneo Uchida	83,607	20.8	3.4
LDP	Shin Kanemaru	68,660.62	17.1	1.1
Socialist	Shin'ichi Kobayashi	65,622	16.4	−2.5
LDP	Eiichi Nakao	62,357	15.5	3.1
Socialist	Tokushige Kanamaru	59,953.33	14.9	−1.4
Kōmeitō	Junrō Oikawa	49,081	12.2	New
JCP	Yoshiyuki Hiraide	9,743	2.4	1.0
Independent	Fumiyoshi Horiuchi	1,575	0.4	New
Independent	Hiroyoshi Sugimoto	647	0.2	0.0

1972
Party	Candidate	Votes	%	±%
LDP	Shin Kanemaru	102,954.79	27.4	6.6
LDP	Tsuneo Uchida	66,213	17.6	0.5
LDP	Eiichi Nakao	61,696	16.4	0.9
Socialist	Shin'ichi Kobayashi	52,703	14.0	−2.4
Socialist	Tokushige Kanamaru	49,909.15	13.3	−1.6
JCP	Yoshiyuki Hinata	42,862	11.4	9.0

1976
Party	Candidate	Votes	%	±%
Socialist	Tsuyoshi Suzuki	74,968	15.7	1.7
LDP	Eiichi Nakao	68,077	14.3	−13.1
LDP	Shin Kanemaru	67,609	14.2	−3.4
LDP	Mitsuo Horiuchi	66,258	13.9	−2.5
LDP	Tsuneo Uchida	61,489	12.9	New
Socialist	Shin'ichi Kobayashi	53,565	11.2	−2.1
Kōmeitō	Junrō Oikawa	43,486	9.1	New
JCP	Yoshiyuki Hinata	33,125	7.0	−4.4
Democratic Socialist	Kin'nosuke Endō	7,905	1.7	New

1979
Party	Candidate	Votes	%	±%
LDP	Shin Kanemaru	92,007	19.7	5.4
LDP	Kunio Tanabe	90,098	19.3	5.1
LDP	Eiichi Nakao	59,474	12.8	−1.1
LDP	Mitsuo Horiuchi	57,957	12.4	−0.5
Socialist	Kiyoshi Kanzawa	55,514	11.9	−3.8
Socialist	Tsuyoshi Suzuki	54,798	11.8	0.6
Kōmeitō	Junrō Oikawa	44,434	9.5	0.4
JCP	Takeshi Fukuda	11,961	2.6	−4.4

1980
Party	Candidate	Votes	%	±%
LDP	Shin Kanemaru	86,919	18.4	−1.3
LDP	Kunio Tanabe	75,013	15.9	−3.4
Socialist	Tsuyoshi Suzuki	72,952	15.5	3.6
LDP	Mitsuo Horiuchi	65,959	14.0	1.2
LDP	Eiichi Nakao	55,089	11.7	−0.7
Socialist	Kiyoshi Kanzawa	48,935	10.4	−1.4
Kōmeitō	Junrō Oikawa	37,857	8.0	−1.5
JCP	Akiji Ishimaru	28,962	6.1	3.5

1983
Party	Candidate	Votes	%	±%
LDP	Shin Kanemaru	96,449	21.2	2.8
Socialist	Tsuyoshi Suzuki	74,562	16.4	0.9
Socialist	Katsuhiko Tanaka	73,193	16.1	5.7
LDP	Kunio Tanabe	71,301	15.7	−0.2
LDP	Mitsuo Horiuchi	61,499	13.5	−0.5
LDP	Eiichi Nakao	59,109	13.0	1.3
JCP	Akiji Ishimaru	19,118	4.2	−1.9

1986
Party	Candidate	Votes	%	±%
LDP	Shin Kanemaru	112,530	22.8	1.6
LDP	Mitsuo Horiuchi	82,388	16.7	1.0
LDP	Eiichi Nakao	79,517	16.1	2.6
LDP	Kunio Tanabe	72,384	14.7	1.7
Socialist	Toshimasa Ueda	66,013	13.4	−3.0
Socialist	Katsuhiko Tanaka	61,128	12.4	−3.7
JCP	Akiji Ishimaru	19,218	3.9	−0.3

1990
Party	Candidate	Votes	%	±%
LDP	Shin Kanemaru	101,756	19.7	−3.1
Socialist	Toshimasa Ueda	94,390	18.3	4.9
Socialist	Azuma Koshiishi	80,311	15.5	3.1
LDP	Eiichi Nakao	77,282	15.0	−1.7
LDP	Kunio Tanabe	75,412	14.6	−1.5
LDP	Mitsuo Horiuchi	70,606	13.7	−1.0
JCP	Shinsaku Sakurai	17,130	3.3	−0.6

1993
Party	Candidate	Votes	%	±%
LDP	Mitsuo Horiuchi	99,708	20.1	0.4
Socialist	Azuma Koshiishi	72,561	14.7	−3.6
New Party	Sakihito Ozawa	71,038	14.3	New
Independent	Shōmei Yokouchi	69,704	14.1	New
LDP	Eiichi Nakao	67,388	13.6	−1.4
LDP	Kunio Tanabe	63,356	12.8	−1.8
Independent	Masaaki Akaike	31,741	6.4	New
JCP	Shinsaku Sakurai	19,696	4.0	0.7
Turnout		658,294	76.19	
