= Hitoshi Goto =

Japanese politician (born 1957)

Hitoshi Gotō
- 後藤 斎
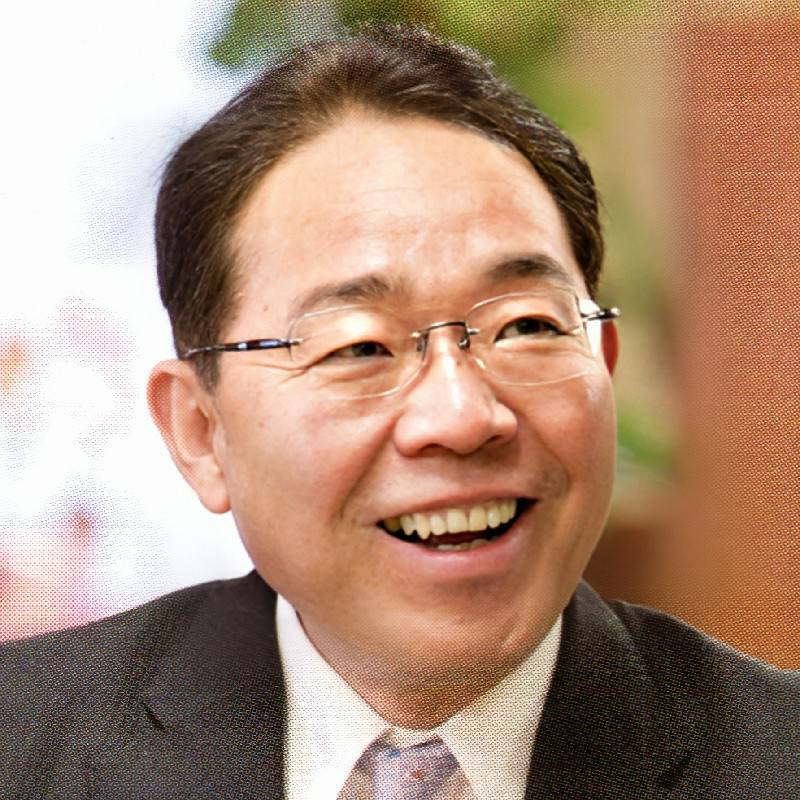
- Goto in 2020

Member of the House of Councillors
- Incumbent
- Assumed office 29 July 2025
- Preceded by: Hiroshi Moriya
- Constituency: Yamanashi at-large

Governor of Yamanashi Prefecture
- In office 17 February 2015 – 16 February 2019
- Monarch: Akihito
- Preceded by: Shōmei Yokouchi
- Succeeded by: Kotaro Nagasaki

Member of the House of Representatives; from Southern Kanto
- In office 11 September 2005 – 11 November 2014
- Preceded by: Multi-member district
- Succeeded by: Constituency abolished
- Constituency: PR block (2005–2009); Yamanashi 3rd (2009–2014)
- In office 25 June 2000 – 10 October 2003
- Constituency: PR block

Personal details
- Born: 22 July 1957 (age 69) Kōfu, Yamanashi, Japan
- Party: DPP (since 2025)
- Other political affiliations: NFP (1996–1998); DPJ (1998–2014); Independent (2014–2022); JIP (2022–2025)
- Education: Tohoku University

Hitoshi Goto (後藤 斎, Gotō Hitoshi; born 22 July 1957) is a Japanese politician who served as the governor of Yamanashi Prefecture. He was formerly a Democratic Party member in the House of Representatives in the Diet (national legislature). He resigned from the Democratic Party and the Diet in November 2014 so that he could contest the January 2015 Yamanashi Gubernatorial election as an independent. A native of Kōfu and graduate of Tohoku University with a Bachelor of Economics, he worked at the Ministry of Agriculture, Forestry and Fisheries from 1980 to 1995.
