= Eiichi Nakao =

Japanese politician (1930–2018)

- 中尾 栄一
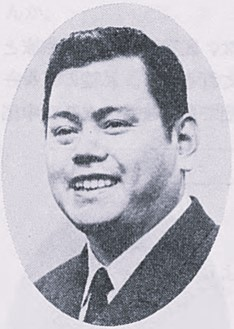
- Nakao in 1967

Minister of Construction
- In office 11 January 1996 – 7 November 1996
- Prime Minister: Ryutaro Hashimoto
- Preceded by: Yoshirō Mori
- Succeeded by: Shizuka Kamei

Minister of International Trade and Industry
- In office 29 December 1990 – 5 November 1991
- Prime Minister: Toshiki Kaifu
- Preceded by: Kabun Mutō
- Succeeded by: Kōzō Watanabe

Director-General of the Economic Planning Agency
- In office 6 November 1987 – 27 December 1988
- Prime Minister: Noboru Takeshita
- Preceded by: Tetsuo Kondo
- Succeeded by: Ken Harada

Member of the House of Representatives; from Yamanashi
- In office 6 July 1986 – 2 June 2000
- Preceded by: Katsuhiko Tanaka
- Succeeded by: Sakihito Ozawa
- Constituency: At-large district (1986–1996); 1st district (1996–2000)
- In office 30 January 1967 – 28 November 1983
- Preceded by: Kunio Tanabe
- Succeeded by: Katsuhiko Tanaka
- Constituency: At-large district

Personal details
- Born: 27 January 1930 Yamagata Prefecture, Japan
- Died: 18 November 2018 (aged 88)
- Children: Kenichi Mizuno
- Parent: Kiyoshi Mizuno (adoptive father)
- Education: Aoyama Gakuin University; Waseda University

Eiichi Nakao (中尾 栄一, Nakao Eiichi; 27 January 1930 – 18 November 2018) was a Japanese politician.

== Career ==
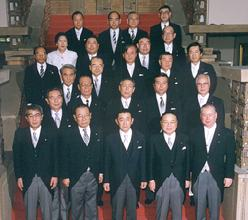
Nakao with members of First Hashimoto Cabinet (at the Prime Minister's Official Residence on January 11, 1996)

Nakao was a member of Liberal Democratic Party. Nakao was elected to the Diet of Japan in 1967.

== Death ==
Nakao died on 18 November 2018, aged 88.

House of Representatives (Japan)
Preceded by Iwazō Kaneko	Chair, Agriculture, Forestry and Fisheries Committee of House of Representatives of Japan; 1978	Succeeded by Takashi Satō
Preceded by Kazuo Shionoya	Chair, Foreign Affairs Committee of House of Representatives of Japan; 1979–1980	Succeeded by Keiwa Okuda
Preceded by Akira Ōno	Chair, Budget Committee of House of Representatives of Japan; 1989	Succeeded by Ihei Ochi
Political offices
Preceded by Tetsuo Kondo	Head of the Economic Planning Agency; 1987–1988	Succeeded by Ken Harada
Preceded by Kabun Mutō	Minister of International Trade and Industry; 1990–1991	Succeeded by Kozo Watanabe
Preceded by Yoshirō Mori	Minister of Construction; 1996	Succeeded by Shizuka Kamei
