= Kenji Hirata =

Japanese Democratic Party politician

- 平田 健二
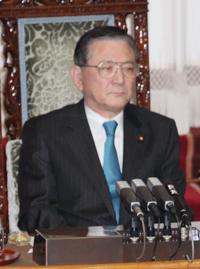
- Hirata in 2012

President of the House of Councillors
- In office 14 November 2011 – 28 July 2013
- Monarch: Akihito
- Vice President: Hidehisa Otsuji; Masaaki Yamazaki
- Preceded by: Takeo Nishioka
- Succeeded by: Masaaki Yamazaki

Member of the House of Councillors
- In office 23 July 1995 – 28 July 2013
- Preceded by: Seat established
- Succeeded by: Seat abolished
- Constituency: Gifu at-large

Personal details
- Born: 4 January 1944 (age 82) Ōita City, Ōita, Japan
- Party: Democratic (1998–2016)
- Other political affiliations: New Frontier (1994–1998); New Fraternity (1998); Democratic (2016–2018)
- Children: 2
- Education: Asahi Kasei Institute of Technology

Kenji Hirata (平田 健二, Hirata Kenji; born January 4, 1944) is a Japanese politician of the Democratic Party of Japan, a member of the House of Councillors in the Diet (national legislature). A native of Ōita, Ōita, he was elected for the first time in 1995 as a member of the New Frontier Party. In November 2011, he was elected as the President of the House of Councillors.
