= Azuma Koshiishi =

Japanese politician

- 輿石 東
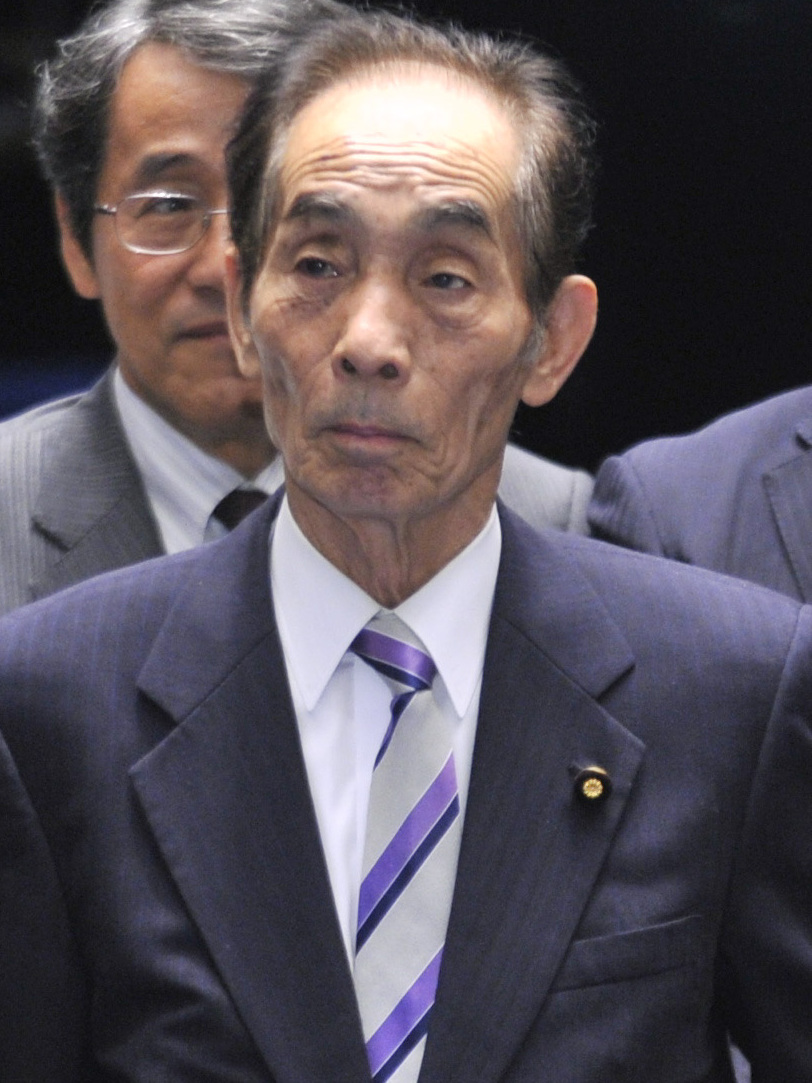
- Koshiishi in 2015

Vice President of the House of Councillors
- In office 2 August 2013 – 25 July 2016
- President: Masaaki Yamazaki
- Preceded by: Masaaki Yamazaki
- Succeeded by: Akira Gunji

Member of the House of Councillors
- In office 12 July 1998 – 25 July 2016
- Preceded by: Tetsurō Shimura
- Succeeded by: Yuka Miyazawa
- Constituency: Yamanashi at-large

Member of the House of Representatives
- In office 18 February 1990 – 27 September 1996
- Preceded by: Mitsuo Horiuchi
- Succeeded by: Constituency abolished
- Constituency: Yamanashi at-large

Personal details
- Born: 14 May 1936 (age 90) Nirasaki, Yamanashi, Japan
- Party: CDP (since 2018)
- Other political affiliations: JSP (1990–1996); SDP (1996); DP 1996 (1996–1998); DPJ (1998–2016); DP 2016 (2016–2018)
- Education: Tsuru Junior College
- Website: Official website

Azuma Koshiishi (輿石 東, Koshiishi Azuma; born 14 May 1936) is a Japanese politician of the Democratic Party, a member of the House of Councillors in the Diet, and general secretary of the ruling Democratic Party. A native of Nirasaki, Yamanashi, and graduate of Tsuru University, he was elected to the House of Representatives in 1990, where he served for two terms until 1996 when he failed to be re-elected. He was elected to the House of Councillors for the first time in 1998.

== Career before politics ==
Koshiishi was an elementary school teacher for 26 years. He became involved in union activities through the Japan Teachers' Union (Nikkyoso), becoming the chair of the executive committee of the Yamanashi branch in 1984, and Chair of the Yamanashi Trade Union Confederation in 1986. Subsequently, he became the director of the Yamanashi Prefecture Educational Research Institute in 1997.

== Political career ==
Koshiishi was elected to the House of Representatives for the first time in 1990, representing the Social Democratic Party. He was re-elected in 1993, serving two terms as a lower-house lawmaker and participated in the formation of the predecessor to the Democratic Party of Japan, but was not re-elected in 1996.

He was elected to the House Councillors for the first time in 1998 and re-elected in 2004 and 2010. In January 2016 he announced that he would not seek a fourth term and was replaced by Democratic Party candidate Yuka Miyazawa at the July 2016 election.

=== As DPJ General Secretary ===
Koshiishi became general secretary of the DPJ on 31 August 2011, the first upper house member of the party to occupy the position, and at 75 years of age, the oldest person ever to become general secretary of the party. His appointment happened as Yoshihiko Noda replaced Naoto Kan as president of the ruling DPJ and therefore prime minister of Japan. Ichiro Ozawa, former DPJ president and powerbroker, had wanted Banri Kaieda in the role of DPJ president instead of Noda. Koshiishi had close ties to Ozawa and Noda appointing him was an attempt at achieving party unity. The attempt was ultimately unsuccessful, as despite Koshiishi attempting to smooth over differences, following Noda's administration passing an increase to the consumption tax from 5% to 10% through the lower house of the diet Ozawa and dozens of lawmakers from his faction left the party in July 2012 to form People's Life First.

Koshiishi was re-appointed general secretary by Noda in September 2012. After Noda won re-election as DPJ president on 21 September he asked Koshiishi to remain in office. Koshiishi refrained from accepting the post again, but accepted it two days later, on 23 September. Just as his initial appointment had been, his reappointment was another attempt to unify the party.

== See also ==
- Japan Teachers' Union

House of Councillors
Preceded by Toshio Fujii	Chair, Committee on Land, Infrastructure, Transport and Tourism of the House of Councillors of Japan; 2003–2004	Succeeded by Masami Tanabu
Preceded by Masaaki Yamazaki	Vice-President of the House of Councillors of Japan; 2013–2014	Succeeded by Akira Gunji
Party political offices
Preceded by Takashi Yamamoto	Secretary-General for the Democratic Party in the House of Councillors; 2004–2006	Succeeded by Akira Imaizumi
Preceded by Satsuki Eda	Chair, General Assembly of Party Members of the House of Councillors; 2006–2013	Succeeded by Akira Gunji
Preceded by Hirohisa Fujii	Acting President of the Democratic Party; 2007–2009; Served alongside: Naoto Kan, Ichirō Ozawa	Succeeded by Yoshito Sengoku
Preceded by Yoshihiko Noda, Kenji Hirata	Acting Secretary-General of the Democratic Party; 2009–2010	Succeeded by Goshi Hosono
Preceded by Katsuya Okada	Secretary-General of the Democratic Party; 2011–2012	Succeeded by Goshi Hosono
