= Voice of the People (Japan) =

Defunct political party in Japan

Voice of the People 国民の声 Kokumin no Koe
- President: Michihiko Kano
- Secretary: Hajime Ishii
- Founded: 4 January 1998
- Dissolved: 23 January 1998
- Split from: New Frontier Party
- Merged into: Good Governance Party
- Ideology: Conservatism (Japanese)
- Councillors: 3 / 252
- Representatives: 15 / 500

Voice of the People (国民の声, Kokumin no Koe) was a short-lived political party in Japan formed in 1998. It was founded by conservative members of the New Frontier Party when that party split at the end of 1997. It was led by Michihiko Kano and consisted of 15 members of the House of Representatives and three members of the House of Councillors. It dissolved less than three weeks after its foundation when it merged with the Sun Party and From Five to form the Good Governance Party. Most of its members went on to join the Democratic Party of Japan.

== History ==
The New Frontier Party was formed by the merger of several competing opposition parties in late 1994. After failing to unseat the ruling LDP in the 1996 election, it suffered from regular defections and questions over its future. In November 1997, the Komeito announced they would run separately in the following year's upper house election, sparking speculation that the party might break apart imminently. President Ichirō Ozawa sought re-election at a party conference in mid-December, where he was challenged by Michihiko Kano. Ozawa won by a margin of 230 votes to 182. Just a week later, he announced the dissolution of the party. Six successor groups emerged from the NFP: the Liberal Party consisting of Ozawa loyalists; the New Peace Party and Dawn Club, both consisting of former Komeito members; the New Fraternity Party consisting of former DSP members; the Reform Club consisting of moderate conservatives; and Voice of the People, consisting of anti-Ozawa conservatives led by Kano.

Within the NFP, Kano had been a strong advocate for cooperation with other opposition parties. Even before Voice of the People's founding conference on 4 January 1998, he agreed on 31 December to form a joint parliamentary group with the Sun Party of Tsutomu Hata and the From Five party of Morihiro Hosokawa. The party was legally established on 6 January, with Kano becoming president, Wakako Hironaka vice-president, and Hajime Ishii secretary-general.

On 14 January, Voice of the People, the Sun Party, and From Five agreed to merge. The merger took place on 23 January and resulted in the creation of the Good Governance Party, led by Hata.

Several members of Voice of the People went on to become prominent members of the Democratic Party of Japan. Michihiko Kano served as minister for agriculture from 2010 to 2012 and ran for Prime Minister in 2011 and 2012. Katsuya Okada was president of the DPJ from 2004–05 and again from 2015–16, and served as foreign affairs minster in 2009–10 and deputy Prime Minister in 2012. Osamu Fujimura was Chief Cabinet Secretary from 2011 to 2012, Kazuhiro Haraguchi was minister for communications from 2009–10, and Masaharu Nakagawa served as minister for education in 2011–12. Hajime Ishii also served as election strategy chair of the DPJ in 2009–10 and again in 2011.

== List of members ==
- Michihiko Kano (President)
- Wakako Hironaka (Vice President)
- Hajime Ishii (Secretary-General)
- Katsuya Okada (Chairman of the Policy Research Council)
- Issei Koga (Chairman of the Diet Affairs Committee)
- Koichiro Aino (Chairman of the Joint Diet Committee)
- Megumu Sato (Chief Advisor)
- Takao Sato
- Shigefumi Matsuzawa
- Eiji Nagai
- Yasuyuki Kitawaki
- Masaharu Nakagawa
- Osamu Fujimura
- Kazuhiro Haraguchi
- Kimiaki Matsuzaki
- Takashi Yamamoto
- Hiroko Wada
- Moto Kobayashi
