= Yorihisa Matsuno =

Japanese politician

- 松野 頼久
- Official portrait, 2009

Deputy Chief Cabinet Secretary (Political affairs, House of Representatives)
- In office 16 September 2009 – 8 June 2010
- Prime Minister: Yukio Hatoyama
- Preceded by: Jun Matsumoto
- Succeeded by: Motohisa Furukawa

Member of the House of Representatives
- In office 26 June 2000 – 28 September 2017
- Preceded by: Eiichi Iwashita
- Succeeded by: Multi-member district
- Constituency: Kumamoto 1st (2000–2012); Kyushu PR (2012–2017)

Personal details
- Born: 19 September 1960 (age 66) Kikuka, Kumamoto, Japan
- Party: Democratic (1998–2012)
- Other political affiliations: JNP (1992–1994); NFP (1994–1997); From Five (1997–1998); GGP (1998); JRP (2012–2014); JIP (2014–2016); DP (2016–2017); KnT (2017)
- Parent: Raizo Matsuno (father)
- Relatives: Noda Utarō (great-grandfather); Tōru Tsukada (brother-in-law)
- Education: Keio University

Yorihisa Matsuno (松野 頼久, Matsuno Yorihisa; born 19 September 1960) is a former Japanese politician. He was a member of the Japan Restoration Association (JRA), and a member of the House of Representatives in the Diet (national legislature). On 3 October 2012, he was selected as the parliamentary leader of the JRA and held this position until the party dissolved in September 2014. He is the member for the Kumamoto No. 1 seat and has been elected four times.

== Background and early career ==
A native of Kamoto District, Kumamoto and graduate of Keio University, he was a staff member at the headquarters of the Japan New Party, and secretary to former Prime Minister Morihiro Hosokawa. Subsequently, he worked at the New Frontier Party headquarters.

He was elected to the House of Representatives for the first time in 2000 after an unsuccessful run in 1998. Matsuno served as Deputy Chief Cabinet Secretary during the 2009–2010 Democratic Party of Japan (DPJ) administration of Prime Minister Yukio Hatoyama. Matsuno was a member of the Hatoyama group within the DPJ.

== Move to Japan Restoration Association ==
On 11 September 2012, Matsuno submitted his resignation to the DPJ and joined Tōru Hashimoto's new national political party, the Japan Restoration Association, Nippon Isshin no Kai. He became one of seven initial lawmakers from the DPJ, Liberal Democratic Party, and Your Party to join the new party.

The first meeting of the nine JRA lawmakers was held on 3 October 2012. Matsuno was selected as the leader of the nine lawmakers.
