= Yoriko Madoka =

Japanese politician

- 円 より子
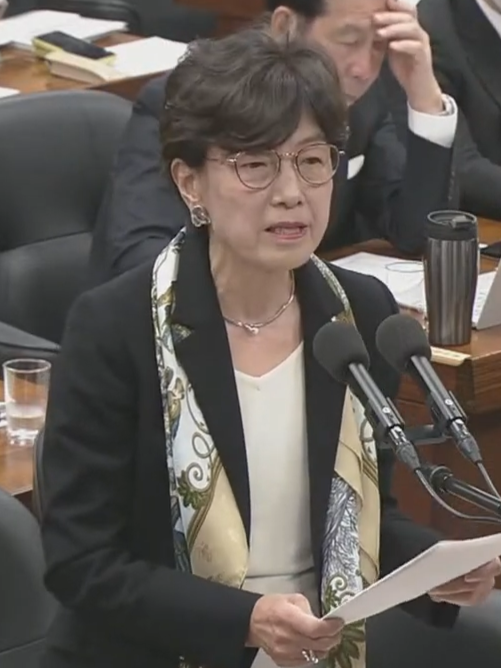
- Madoka in 2025

Member of House of Representatives
- In office 1 November 2024 – 23 January 2026
- Constituency: Tokyo PR

Member of House of Councillors
- In office 16 July 1993 – 25 July 2010
- Preceded by: Yuriko Koike
- Succeeded by: Multi-member district
- Constituency: National PR

Personal details
- Born: 10 February 1947 (age 79) Yokosuka, Kanagawa, Japan
- Party: Independent
- Other political affiliations: JNP (1993–1994); NFP (1994–1997); From Five (1997–1998); GGP (1998); DPJ (1998–2015); Independent (2015–2019); DPP (2019–2026); CRA (2026)
- Education: Tsuda College

Yoriko Madoka (Japanese: 円 より子, Hepburn: Madoka Yoriko; born 10 February 1947) is a Japanese politician who served in the House of Councillors from 1993 to 2010 and served as a member of the House of Representatives from 2024 to 2026.

== Early life and career ==
Madoka was born in Yokosuka, Kanagawa and grew up in Yao, Osaka and Takamatsu, Kagawa. She graduated from Tsuda College in 1969, and worked in the editorial department of the English-language newspaper The Japan Times and as a freelance journalist and author, particularly focusing on women and family issues. Her efforts also made her prominent as a television commentator.

== Political career ==
Madoka ran unsuccessfully in the 1992 House of Councillors election as a proportional representation candidate from the Japan New Party (JNP). After three members resigned from the House to run in the 1993 general election, Madoka was elected to fill one of the vacated seats (that of Yuriko Koike).

She was chairman of the JNP Organizing Committee at its dissolution on 9 December 1994, when it merged with other parties to form the New Frontier Party (NFP). Madoka served as the Deputy Minister of Justice in NFP's shadow cabinet, but left the party on 22 December 1997 together with former JNP head Morihiro Hosokawa as part of the "From Five" group with Shinji Tarutoko, Kiyoshi Ueda and Takenori Emoto. She moved alongside them to the Good Governance Party and finally the Democratic Party of Japan (DPJ) in 1998.

Madoka was elected as a DPJ candidate in the 1998 election and 2004 election, but lost her seat in the 2010 election. In 1999, she became the first member of the House of Councillors to give a speech longer than three hours when she spoke against the enactment of a telecommunications interception statute.

After leaving the House of Councillors, she unsuccessfully ran in the 2012 general election for the Tokyo 8th district seat in the House of Representatives, losing to Nobuteru Ishihara and second-ranked Tarō Yamamoto. She was also a proportional representation candidate in the 2013 House of Councillors election but was ranked fifteenth out of twenty DPJ candidates and failed to win one of the seven PR seats won by the party.

She served as a policy advisor to Morihiro Hosokawa during the 2014 Tokyo gubernatorial election.

In 2016, Madoka unsuccessfully ran once again for a National PR block seat in the House of Councillors as a member of the Angry Voice of the Citizens party.

She joined Yuichiro Tamaki's Democratic Party for the People on 8 May 2019 and stood for election to the House of Councillors PR block, but was again unsuccessful.

Madoka was eventually elected in 2024 as a member of the Democratic Party for the People.

In January 2026, she left the DPFP to join the newly formed Centrist Reform Alliance ahead of the election. The CRA announced Madoka would be moved to the proportional list, while another candidate would contest Tokyo 17th district. Madoka announced she had not agreed to this and left the CRA to run as an independent. She was not re-elected in the 2026 election.
