= Katsuya Okada =

Japanese politician (born 1953)

- 岡田 克也
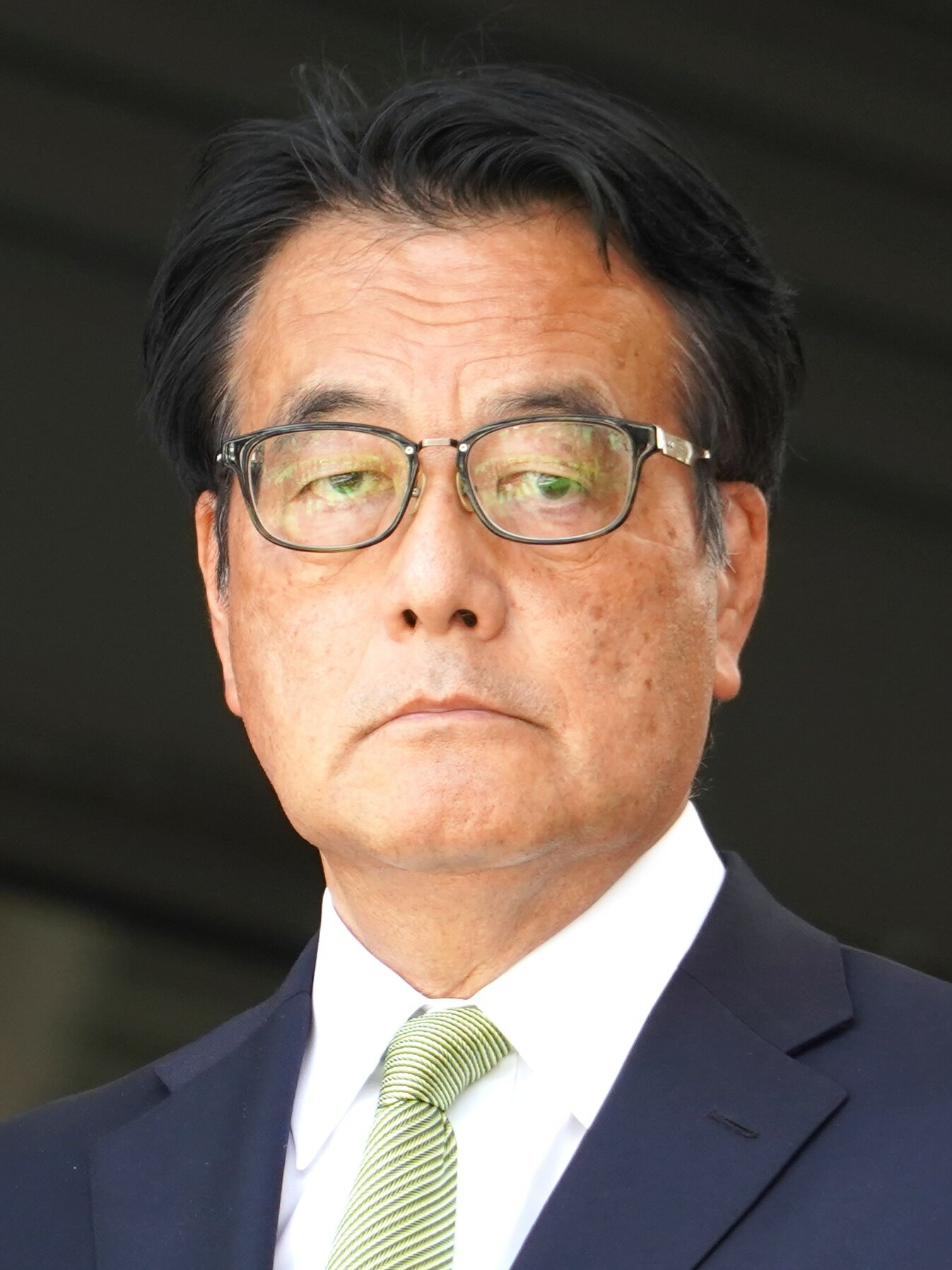
- Okada in 2023

Secretary-General of Constitutional Democratic Party
- In office 26 August 2022 – 23 September 2024
- Leader: Kenta Izumi
- Preceded by: Chinami Nishimura
- Succeeded by: Junya Ogawa

President of the Democratic Party of Japan
- In office 14 December 2014 – 1 October 2016
- Preceded by: Banri Kaieda
- Succeeded by: Renhō
- In office 18 August 2004 – 17 September 2005
- Preceded by: Naoto Kan
- Succeeded by: Seiji Maehara

Deputy Prime Minister of Japan
- In office 13 January 2012 – 26 December 2012
- Prime Minister: Yoshihiko Noda
- Preceded by: Naoto Kan (2010)
- Succeeded by: Tarō Asō
Ministerial offices
Minister of Administrative Reform
In office 13 January 2012 – 26 December 2012
Prime Minister	Yoshihiko Noda
Preceded by	Akira Amari (2009)
Succeeded by	Tomomi Inada
Minister for Foreign Affairs
In office 16 September 2009 – 17 September 2010
Prime Minister	Yukio Hatoyama; Naoto Kan
Preceded by	Hirofumi Nakasone
Succeeded by	Seiji Maehara

Member of the House of Representatives
- In office 19 February 1990 – 23 January 2026
- Preceded by: Sachio Yamamoto
- Succeeded by: Masataka Ishihara
- Constituency: Former Mie 1st (1990–1996); Mie 3rd (1996–2026)

Personal details
- Born: 14 July 1953 (age 73) Yokkaichi, Mie, Japan
- Party: CRA (since 2026)
- Other political affiliations: LDP (before 1994); NFP (1994–1996); Sun (1996–1998); GGP (1998); DPJ (1998–2016); DP (2016–2017); Independent (2017–2020); CDP (2020–2026)
- Spouse: Tatsuko Okada
- Children: 3
- Education: University of Tokyo
- Profession: Bureaucrat; Politician
- Website: Official website

Katsuya Okada (岡田 克也, Okada Katsuya; born 14 July 1953) is a Japanese politician who was Deputy Prime Minister of Japan from January to December 2012. A member of the House of Representatives of Japan, he was the president of the Democratic Party, and previously of the Democratic Party of Japan. He also served as Secretary-General of the DPJ three times. During the DPJ's period in government he was Foreign Minister of Japan.

In 2016, he remained as leader when the Democratic Party of Japan merged with the Japan Innovation Party to become the Democratic Party.

== Early life and education ==
Okada was born on 14 July 1953. He is the second son of Takuya Okada, who is a co-founder of AEON Group. His elder brother, Motoya Okada, is the president and CEO of AEON Group. He has a younger brother and a half-sister. A native of Yokkaichi, Mie, Okada graduated from the University of Tokyo with a degree in law, and entered the Ministry of International Trade and Industry. He also did a short course at Weatherhead Center for International Affairs in Harvard University.

== Political career ==
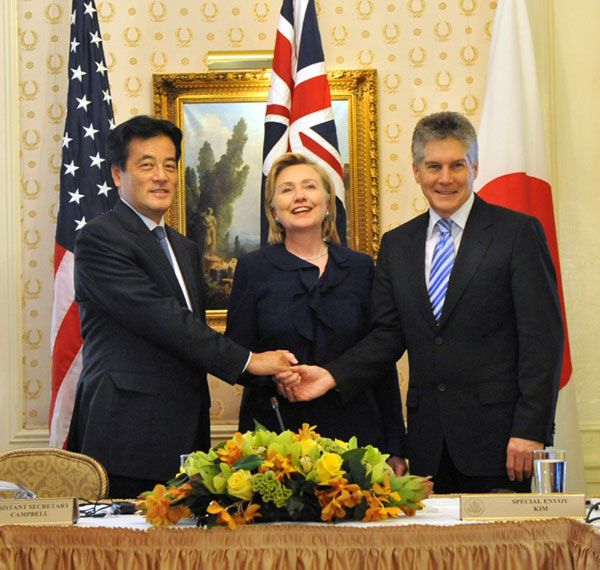
Okada with Hillary Clinton and Stephen Smith in 2009

Okada ran for the House of Representatives at the 1990 general election from LDP, representing Mie Prefecture's third district, and later joined the Takeshita faction of the Liberal Democratic Party, and followed faction leaders Tsutomu Hata and Ichirō Ozawa to join the Japan Renewal Party in 1993. Through a series of splits and mergers, Okada then became a member of the New Frontier Party, Sun Party, and Minseito, finally entering the DPJ upon its merger with Minseito in 1998.

He became president of the DPJ on 18 May 2004, and led the DPJ to one of its largest electoral victories in history during the 2004 House of Councillors election. However, he resigned after his party suffered dramatic losses in the September 2005 general election.

Okada ran for the presidency in 2009 but lost to Yukio Hatoyama. Following the success of the DPJ in the 2009 general election, Hatoyama selected Okada to be the foreign minister.

Okada was regarded as a possible successor of Hatoyama when Hatoyama announced his resignation as Prime Minister and DPJ leader in June 2010, but Okada gave his support to Finance Minister Naoto Kan, who quickly emerged as the likely successor to Hatoyama. Ichirō Ozawa, however, whose resignation had also been reported announced by Hatoyama, was still supporting another less well known possible successor, Shinji Tarutoko, 50, a legislator who leads the environmental policy committee in the lower house of Parliament, a day before the DPJ leadership elections. After being selected as the new prime minister, Kan reaffirmed Okada as foreign minister.

As foreign minister, Okada was one of the chief participants in negotiations with the United States (US) over the relocation of Marine Corps Air Station Futenma on Okinawa. The Foreign Ministry under Okada also confirmed the existence of a long-rumored secret pact between Japan and US which had allowed the US military to carry nuclear weapons into Japanese territory in contravention of the Treaty of Mutual Cooperation and Security between the United States and Japan. The previous administration under the LDP had denied that such a pact existed.

In a September 2010 cabinet reshuffle, Okada was moved from foreign minister to secretary general of the DPJ. Okada, who is viewed as an intraparty ally of Prime Minister Naoto Kan, is believed to have been given the role of secretary general in order to secure Kan's influence in the governing party, as well as to help force the passage of government bills in parliament.

Okada ran in the DPJ leadership election held in January 2015 after former president Banri Kaieda resigned after losing his seat. Okada won and returned as DPJ leader after a period of nine years.

In 2015, there were allegations made against Okada, saying that he had accepted 240,000 yen ($2,000) in donations from Nisshin Seifun Group Inc. in 2011 and 2012.

In 2016, he remained as leader when the Democratic Party of Japan merged with the Japan Innovation Party to become the Democratic Party. Following the party's defeat at the House of Councillors election in July, he announced that he would not seek re-election as leader at the party's annual meeting in September.

In 2022, Okada was appointed to be the secretary general of the CDP, replacing Chinami Nishimura. Okada currently holds the secretary general position to this day.

He was many times interviewed by Sekai Nippo, the official newspaper of the Unification Church, an anti-communism new religion. He does not support marriage equality.

== Other interests ==
Okada is said to be an avid collector of frog knick knacks, which decorate his office.

== Election history ==
Election	Age	District	Political party	Number of votes	election results
1990 Japanese general election	36	Mie 1st district	LDP	97,290	winning
1993 Japanese general election	40	Mie 1st district	JRP	142,215	winning
1996 Japanese general election	43	Mie 3rd district	NFP	108,690	winning
2000 Japanese general election	46	Mie 3rd district	DPJ	117,868	winning
2003 Japanese general election	50	Mie 3rd district	DPJ	132,109	winning
2005 Japanese general election	52	Mie 3rd district	DPJ	140,954	winning
2009 Japanese general election	56	Mie 3rd district	DPJ	173,931	winning
2012 Japanese general election	59	Mie 3rd district	DPJ	126,679	winning
2014 Japanese general election	61	Mie 3rd district	DPJ	120,950	winning
2017 Japanese general election	64	Mie 3rd district	Independent	147,255	winning
2021 Japanese general election	68	Mie 3rd district	CDP	144,688	winning
2024 Japanese general election	71	Mie 3rd district	CDP	137,953	winning
2026 Japanese general election	72	Mie 3rd district	CRA	90,701	Lost

== See also ==
- Aeon Group
- Chunichi Shimbun - Japanese left-leaning local newspaper. His younger brother Masaya Takada is an employee of the newspaper.
- New Frontier Party
- Neoliberalism
- Sekai Nippo

Party political offices
Preceded by Naoto Kan	Chairman of the Policy Affairs Research Council, Democratic Party; 2000–2002	Succeeded by Banri Kaieda
Preceded by Kansei Nakano	Secretary-General of the Democratic Party; 2002–2004	Succeeded by Hirohisa Fujii
Preceded by Naoto Kan	Leader of the Democratic Party; 2004–2005	Succeeded by Seiji Maehara
Preceded by Yukio Hatoyama	Secretary-General of the Democratic Party; 2009	Succeeded by Ichirō Ozawa
Preceded by Yukio Edano	Secretary-General of the Democratic Party; 2010-2011	Succeeded by Azuma Koshiishi
Preceded by Banri Kaieda	Leader of the Democratic Party; 2015–2006	Succeeded by Renho
Preceded by Chinami Nishimura	Secretary-General of the Constitutional Democratic Party; 2022-2024	Succeeded by Junya Ogawa
Political offices
Preceded by Hirofumi Nakasone	Minister for Foreign Affairs; 2009–2010	Succeeded by Seiji Maehara
Preceded by Naoto Kan	Deputy Prime Minister of Japan; 2012	Succeeded by Tarō Asō
Preceded by Renho	Minister of State for Administrative Reform; 2012	Succeeded by Tomomi Inada
House of Representatives (Japan)
Preceded by Jirō Kawasaki; Sachio Yamamoto; Masayasu Kitagawa; Chikara Sakaguchi; Chūji Itō	Representative for Mie 1st district 1990–1996; Served alongside: Chūji Itō, Masayasu Kitagawa, Jirō Kawasaki, Hiroshi Nakai, Chikara Sakaguchi	District eliminated
New district	Representative for Mie 3rd district (single-member); 1996–	Incumbent
