= Takenori Emoto =

Japanese baseball player

- 江本 孟紀
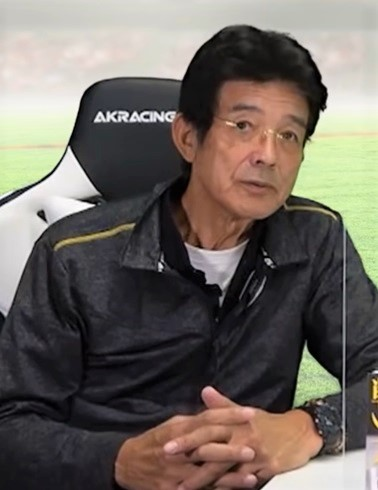
- Emoto in 2020

Member of the House of Councillors
- In office 27 July 1992 – 15 January 2004
- Preceded by: Multi-member district
- Succeeded by: Toshikazu Higuchi
- Constituency: National PR

Personal details
- Born: 22 July 1947 (age 78) Kami, Kōchi, Japan
- Party: Independent
- Other political affiliations: SPP (1992–1995); LL (1995–1997); FF (1997–1998); GGP (1998); DPJ (1998–2004); PNP (2010)
- Baseball career
- Pitcher
- Batted: Right Threw: Right

NPB debut
- April 11, 1971, for the Toei Flyers

Last appearance
- August 26, 1981, for the Hanshin Tigers

Career statistics
- Wins: 113
- Losses: 126
- E.R.A.: 3.52
- Stats at Baseball Reference

Teams
- Toei Flyers (1971); Nankai Hawks (1972–1975); Hanshin Tigers (1976–1981)

Takenori Emoto (江本 孟紀, born July 22, 1947) is a Japanese professional baseball pitcher in Nippon Professional Baseball. He played for the Toei Flyers in 1971, the Nankai Hawks from 1972 to 1975, and the Hanshin Tigers from 1976 to 1981.

Emoto was unusually non-confirmative for a player, once almost being released by the team for letting his hair grow over his ears. After complaining publicly about being shuttled between starting and relief in 1981, he was forced to retire by his team the Hanshin Tigers. Despite being only 34 years old, he was prevented from pitching professionally again.

Emoto later went on to write a series of successful tell-all books about his experiences in professional baseball, drawing comparisons to pitcher-turned-author Jim Bouton.

Turning to politics, in the late 1990s Emoto became a member of From Five, a political party that existed from December 1997 to January 1998. It was formed by former Prime Minister Morihiro Hosokawa and four other legislators (Emoto, Yoriko Madoka, Shinji Tarutoko, and Kiyoshi Ueda) who left the New Frontier Party in June 1997. From Five merged into the Good Governance Party in January 1998, which became part of the Democratic Party of Japan in 1998. In 1998, Emoto, as a member of the DPJ, was elected to the Japanese House of Councillors.
