= Democratic Reform Party (Japan, 1989) =

Defunct political party in Japan

Democratic Reform Party 民主改革連合 Minshu Kaikaku Rengō
- Founded: 9 June 1989
- Dissolved: 27 April 1998
- Merged into: Democratic Party of Japan

The Democratic Reform Party (民主改革連合, Minshu Kaikaku Rengō; "Democratic Reform Union"), abbreviated as Minkairen (民改連), was a political party in Japan formed in 1989. It was founded under the name Rengo no Kai (連合の会, Rengō no Kai; "Union Association") to contest the 1989 Japanese House of Councillors election before changing its name in 1993. It merged with other parties to form the Democratic Party of Japan in April 1998.

== History ==
The party originated as an electoral platform of the Japanese Trade Union Confederation (RENGO), which was founded in 1989. The RENGO negotiated an electoral alliance between the Japan Socialist Party, Democratic Socialist Party, Komeito, and Socialist Democratic Federation for the 1989 House of Councillors election. The four parties agreed to withdraw from select constituencies and jointly endorse RENGO candidates. The alliance was highly successful, with eleven of the twelve RENGO candidates (running under the banner "Rengo no Kai") winning their races. The Rengo no Kai candidates formed a parliamentary group in the House of Councillors, which comprised most of the party activity until 1994.

The party ran again in the 1992 House of Councillors election with an enlarged slate of 23 candidates, endorsed by the JSP, DSP, and SDF, but none were elected. In June 1993, the party changed its name to the Democratic Reform Party. The party supported the Hosokawa cabinet, and member Harumi Inui was appointed parliamentary vice-minister for science and technology. They also supported the short-lived Hata cabinet, in which they had two members: Koki Hagino as parliamentary vice-minster for science and technology and Tasaburo Furukawa as parliamentary vice-minister for land, infrastructure and transport.

Following the formation of the New Frontier Party, the Rengo no Kai remained separate. They ran eleven candidates in the 1995 Japanese House of Councillors election but only two were elected, reducing from eight prior to the election to only two. The party ran in the House of Representatives for the first time in the 1996 election and elected one member, Ryuichi Doi, in the Hyogo 3rd constituency. The party voted for Ichirō Ozawa for Prime Minister following the election. In November, they formed a joint parliamentary group with the Democratic Party.

Following the breakup of the New Frontier Party, the Democratic Party and Minkairen formed a joined parliamentary group with four of its splinter parties (the New Fraternity Party, Sun Party, Voice of the People, and From Five). In April, all of these parties, including Minkairen, successively merged to form the new Democratic Party of Japan.

== Election results ==
=== House of Representatives ===
| Election | Leader | Constituency | | | Party list | | | Seats | Position | Status |
| Election | Leader | Votes | % | Seats | Votes | % | Seats | Seats | Position | Status |
|---|---|---|---|---|---|---|---|---|---|---|
| 1996 | Teiko Sasano | 149,357 | 0.26 | 1 / 300 | 18,844 | 0.03 | 0 / 200 | 1 / 500 | 7th | Opposition |

=== House of Councillors ===
| Election | Leader | Constituency | | | Party list | | | Seats | | Position | Status |
| Election | Leader | Votes | % | Seats | Votes | % | Seats | Election | Total | Position | Status |
|---|---|---|---|---|---|---|---|---|---|---|---|
| 1989 | Minoru Toyoda | 3,878,783 | 6.82 | 11 / 76 | Did not run | | | 11 / 126 | 12 / 252 | 5th | Opposition |
| 1992 | Yasumatsu Hoshikawa | 4,399,684 | 9.69 | 0 / 77 | Did not run | | | 0 / 127 | 12 / 252 | 4th | Opposition |
| 1995 | Osamu Isomura | 1,854,175 | 4.46 | 2 / 76 | Did not run | | | 2 / 126 | 2 / 252 | 7th | Opposition |
