= Tsujimura =

Tsujimura (辻村) is a Japanese surname. Notable people with the surname include:

- Mahito Tsujimura (1930–2018), Japanese voice actor
- Michiyo Tsujimura (1888–1969), Japanese agricultural scientist and biochemist
- Mizuki Tsujimura (born 1980), Japanese mystery and children's writer
- Shūkichi Tsujimura (1910–1991), Japanese photographer
- Takeshi Tsujimura (born 1974), Japanese motorcycle racer
- Shiro Tsujimura (born 1947), Japanese ceramic artist

== See also ==
- 14504 Tsujimura main-belt asteroid
