= 1989 Japanese House of Councillors election =

- 23 July 1989

126 of the 252 seats in the House of Councillors 127 seats needed for a majority
- Turnout: 65.01% (▼6.31pp)
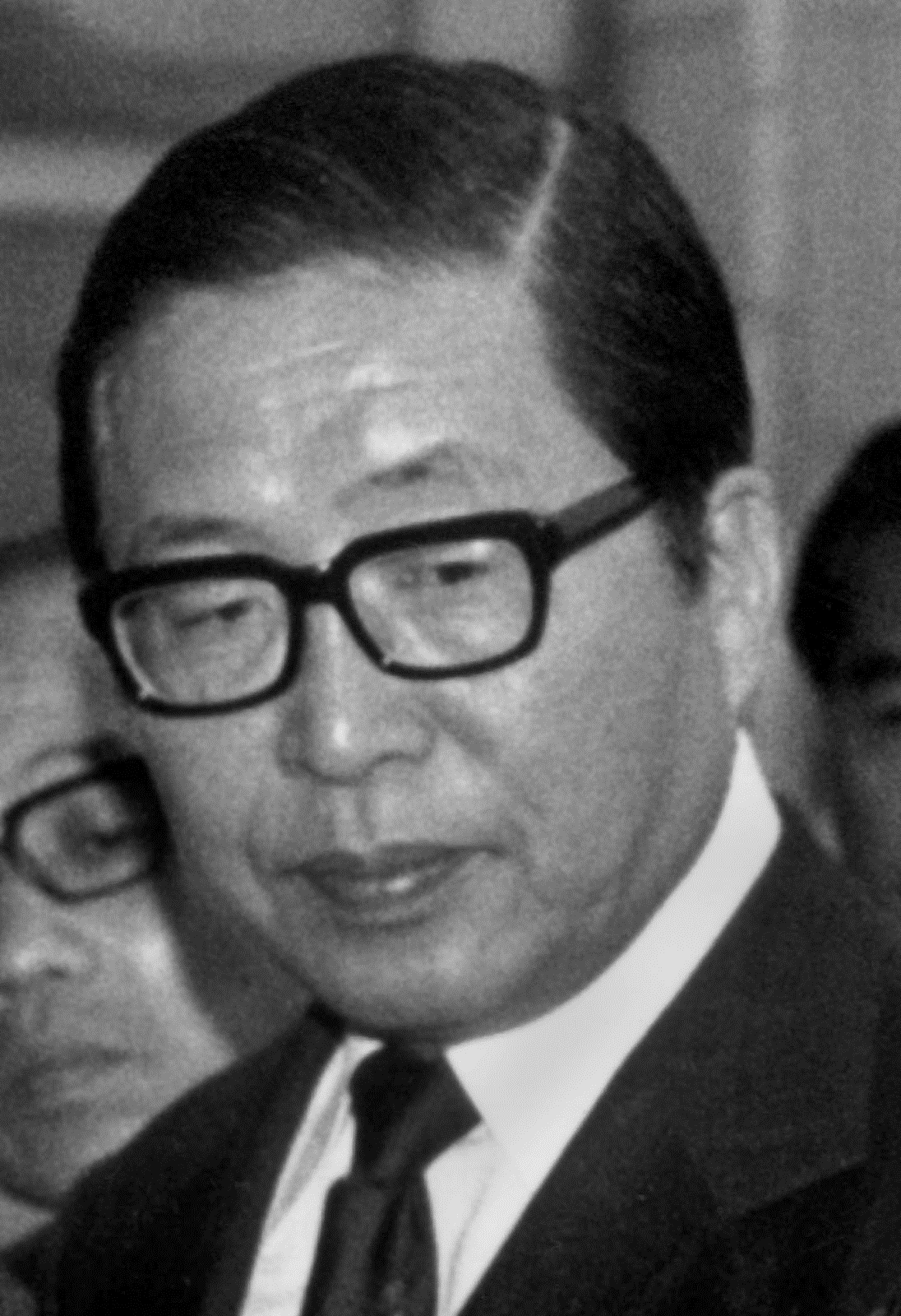

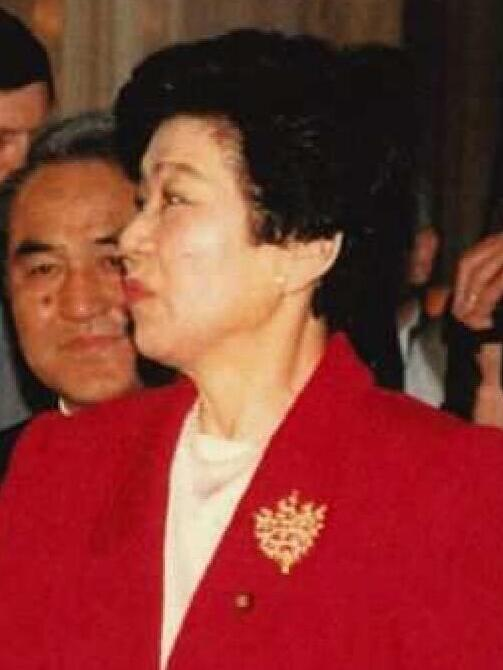

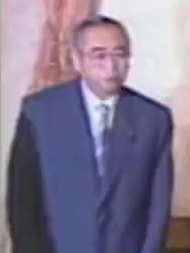

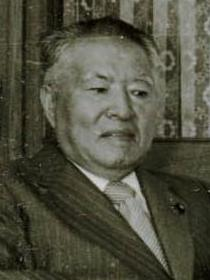

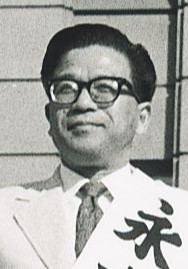
| | First party | Second party | Third party |
|---|---|---|---|
| Leader | Sōsuke Uno | Takako Doi | Koshiro Ishida |
| Party | LDP | Socialist | Kōmeitō |
| Last election | 140 seats | 41 seats | 24 seats |
| Seats won | 36 | 46 | 10 |
| Seats after | 109 | 66 | 20 |
| Seat change | ▼31 | ▲25 | ▼4 |
| Constituency vote | 17,466,406 | 15,009,451 | 2,900,947 |
| % and swing | 30.70% (▼14.37pp) | 26.38% (▲4.87pp) | 5.10% (▲0.70pp) |
| National vote | 15,343,455 | 19,688,252 | 6,097,971 |
| % and swing | 27.32% (▼11.26pp) | 35.05% (▲17.85pp) | 10.86% (▼2.11pp) |
| | Fourth party | Fifth party | Sixth party |
| Leader | Kenji Miyamoto | | Eiichi Nagasue |
| Party | JCP | Rengo no Kai | Democratic Socialist |
| Last election | 16 seats | Did not exist | 12 seats, 6.9% |
| Seats won | 5 | 11 | 3 |
| Seats after | 14 | 12 | 8 |
| Seat change | ▼2 | New | ▼4 |
| Constituency vote | 5,012,424 | 3,878,783 | 2,066,533 |
| % and swing | 8.81% (▼2.61pp) | 6.82% (New) | 3.63% (▼0.93pp) |
| National vote | 3,954,408 | — | 2,726,419 |
| % and swing | 7.04% (▼2.43pp) | | 4.85% (▼2.02pp) |
- Results of the election, showing the winning candidates in each prefecture and the national PR block
President of the House
of Councillors before election
Yoshihiro Tsuchiya
LDP
Elected President of the House
of Councillors
Yoshihiro Tsuchiya
LDP

House of Councillors elections were held in Japan on 23 July 1989.

There were several controversial issues dominating the pre-election atmosphere, all of which reflected negatively on the ruling LDP. The most important, according to most polls, was the introduction of an unpopular 3% consumption tax law which had been forced through the Diet by Prime Minister Noboru Takeshita despite boycotts by the opposition parties, an act which hurt the LDP's image with the public. A second issue was the infamous Recruit scandal, which induced the resignation of Takeshita and his cabinet members, and damaged the public's impression of the LDP's integrity. There was also resistance to the LDP's gradual adoption of import liberalisation of food products, which lost the party their traditional rural voters resentful of farm imports. Also, incumbent Prime Minister Sōsuke Uno's sex scandal had come to light only a month earlier.

The result of all of this negative feeling towards the LDP was an unprecedented victory for the Japan Socialist Party (JSP), roughly doubling its share of the popular vote when compared to the previous House of Councillors elections, and being the only major pre-existing party to see a net increase in its share of the popular vote; the other opposition parties, which had more success in the past while the JSP stagnated, saw net decreases in both popular votes as well as seat numbers. Moreover, although the Japanese Communist Party has historically contributed to vote splitting by fielding candidates in every district, the overall decline in support for the JCP is thought to have helped jointly-backed opposition candidates in this election. In any event, the JSP would cooperate with the other opposition parties in order to form a majority coalition over a minority LDP, a historical first for the House of Councillors.

Meanwhile, the LDP lost the popular vote in an election for the first time in its history, and the only one-seat districts won by the LDP were Toyama, Shiga, and Wakayama. The LDP's losses were strongest in single-member constituencies, but less strongly felt in multi-member constituencies, no doubt partly due to the above-mentioned relative lack of vote splitting in this election. After this election, the LDP designated as its new leader Toshiki Kaifu, who belonged to the same historical faction as Takeo Miki, and who, like Miki, was reform-minded; ironically, Kaifu later defected from the LDP in the mid-1990s in order to join the opposition, although he eventually returned to the LDP in the 21st century.

== Results ==
| Party | National | | | Constituency | | | Seats | | | |
| Party | Votes | % | Seats | Votes | % | Seats | Not up | Won | Total after | +/– |
|---|---|---|---|---|---|---|---|---|---|---|
| Japan Socialist Party | 19,688,252 | 35.05 | 20 | 15,009,451 | 26.38 | 26 | 20 | 46 | 66 | +25 |
| Liberal Democratic Party | 15,343,455 | 27.32 | 15 | 17,466,406 | 30.70 | 21 | 73 | 36 | 109 | –31 |
| Kōmeitō | 6,097,971 | 10.86 | 6 | 2,900,947 | 5.10 | 4 | 10 | 10 | 20 | –4 |
| Japanese Communist Party | 3,954,408 | 7.04 | 4 | 5,012,424 | 8.81 | 1 | 9 | 5 | 14 | –2 |
| Democratic Socialist Party | 2,726,419 | 4.85 | 2 | 2,066,533 | 3.63 | 1 | 5 | 3 | 8 | –4 |
| Dainiin Club | 1,250,022 | 2.23 | 1 | | | | 1 | 1 | 2 | –1 |
| Tax Affairs Party | 1,179,939 | 2.10 | 1 | 889,633 | 1.56 | 1 | 1 | 2 | 3 | +1 |
| Sports and Peace Party | 993,989 | 1.77 | 1 | | | | 0 | 1 | 1 | New |
| Rengo no Kai | | | | 3,878,783 | 6.82 | 11 | 1 | 11 | 12 | New |
| Other parties | 4,936,873 | 8.79 | 0 | 2,312,733 | 4.06 | 1 | 1 | 1 | 2 | – |
| Independents | | | | 7,362,723 | 12.94 | 10 | 5 | 10 | 15 | +8 |
| Total | 56,171,328 | 100.00 | 50 | 56,899,633 | 100.00 | 76 | 126 | 126 | 252 | 0 |
| Valid votes | 56,171,328 | 96.13 | | 56,899,633 | 97.35 | | | | | |
| Invalid/blank votes | 2,262,734 | 3.87 | | 1,546,732 | 2.65 | | | | | |
| Total votes | 58,434,062 | 100.00 | | 58,446,365 | 100.00 | | | | | |
| Registered voters/turnout | 89,891,358 | 65.01 | | 89,891,358 | 65.02 | | | | | |
Source: Ministry of Internal Affairs and Communications, National Diet

=== By constituency ===
| Constituency | Total seats | Seats won | | | | | | | | | | |
| Constituency | Total seats | JSP | LDP | Rengo | Kōmeitō | JCP | DSP | TAP | DC | SPP | Others | Ind. |
|---|---|---|---|---|---|---|---|---|---|---|---|---|
| Aichi | 3 | 1 | 1 | | | | 1 | | | | | |
| Akita | 1 | 1 | | | | | | | | | | |
| Aomori | 1 | | | | | | | | | | | 1 |
| Chiba | 2 | 1 | 1 | | | | | | | | | |
| Ehime | 1 | | | 1 | | | | | | | | |
| Fukui | 1 | | | 1 | | | | | | | | |
| Fukuoka | 3 | 1 | 1 | | 1 | | | | | | | |
| Fukushima | 2 | 1 | 1 | | | | | | | | | |
| Gifu | 1 | | | 1 | | | | | | | | |
| Gunma | 2 | 1 | 1 | | | | | | | | | |
| Hiroshima | 2 | 1 | 1 | | | | | | | | | |
| Hokkaido | 4 | 1 | 1 | | | 1 | | | | | | 1 |
| Hyōgo | 3 | 1 | 1 | | 1 | | | | | | | |
| Ibaraki | 2 | 1 | 1 | | | | | | | | | |
| Ishikawa | 1 | | | 1 | | | | | | | | |
| Iwate | 1 | 1 | | | | | | | | | | |
| Kagawa | 1 | 1 | | | | | | | | | | |
| Kagoshima | 2 | 1 | 1 | | | | | | | | | |
| Kanagawa | 2 | 1 | 1 | | | | | | | | | |
| Kōchi | 1 | 1 | | | | | | | | | | |
| Kumamoto | 2 | | | | | | | | | | | 2 |
| Kyoto | 2 | | 1 | 1 | | | | | | | | |
| Mie | 1 | | | 1 | | | | | | | | |
| Miyagi | 1 | 1 | | | | | | | | | | |
| Miyazaki | 1 | 1 | | | | | | | | | | |
| Nagano | 2 | 1 | 1 | | | | | | | | | |
| Nagasaki | 1 | 1 | | | | | | | | | | |
| Nara | 1 | | | 1 | | | | | | | | |
| Niigata | 2 | 1 | 1 | | | | | | | | | |
| Ōita | 1 | 1 | | | | | | | | | | |
| Okinawa | 1 | | | | | | | | | | 1 | |
| Okayama | 2 | 1 | 1 | | | | | | | | | |
| Osaka | 3 | 1 | | | 1 | | | | | | | 1 |
| Saga | 1 | | 1 | | | | | | | | | |
| Saitama | 2 | 1 | | | | | | | | | | 1 |
| Shiga | 1 | | | 1 | | | | | | | | |
| Shimane | 1 | | | | | | | | | | | 1 |
| Shizuoka | 2 | | 1 | | | | | | | | | 1 |
| Tochigi | 2 | 1 | 1 | | | | | | | | | |
| Tokushima | 1 | | | 1 | | | | | | | | |
| Tokyo | 4 | | 1 | | 1 | | | 1 | | | | 1 |
| Tottori | 1 | | | | | | | | | | | 1 |
| Toyama | 1 | | 1 | | | | | | | | | |
| Wakayama | 1 | | 1 | | | | | | | | | |
| Yamagata | 1 | | | 1 | | | | | | | | |
| Yamaguchi | 1 | 1 | | | | | | | | | | |
| Yamanashi | 1 | | | 1 | | | | | | | | |
| National | 50 | 20 | 15 | | 6 | 4 | 2 | 1 | 1 | 1 | | |
| Total | 126 | 46 | 36 | 11 | 10 | 5 | 3 | 2 | 1 | 1 | 1 | 10 |
