= 1995 Japanese House of Councillors election =

- 23 July 1995

126 of the 252 seats in the House of Councillors 127 seats needed for a majority
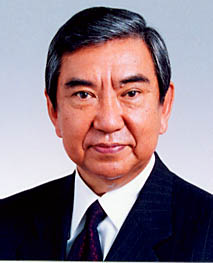

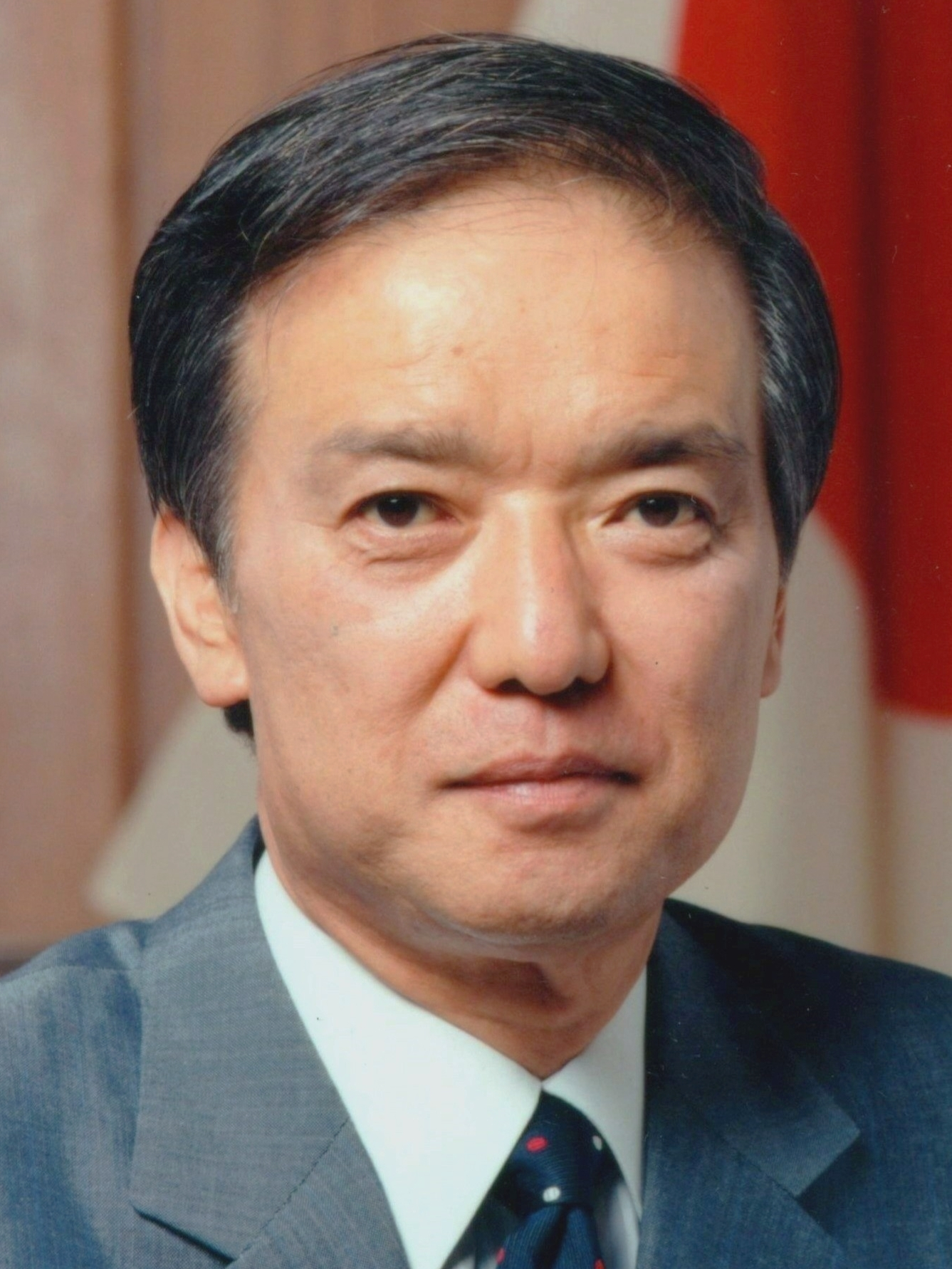

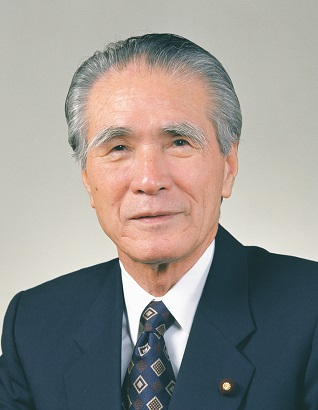

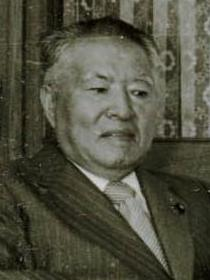

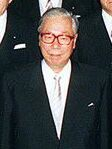
	First party	Second party	Third party
Leader	Yōhei Kōno	Toshiki Kaifu	Tomiichi Murayama
Party	LDP	New Frontier	Socialist
Last election	106 seats	Did not exist	71 seats
Seats won	46	40	16
Seats after	111	56	38
Seat change	▲5	New	▼33
Constituency vote	10,557,547	11,003,681	4,926,003
% and swing	25.40% (▼18.03pp)	26.47% (New)	11.85% (▼1.03pp)
National vote	11,096,972	12,506,322	6,882,919
% and swing	27.29% (▼5.68pp)	30.75% (New)	16.92% (▼0.67pp)
	Fourth party	Fifth party
Leader	Kenji Miyamoto	Masayoshi Takemura
Party	JCP	NP-Sakigake
Last election	11 seats	Did not exist
Seats won	8	3
Seats after	14	3
Seat change	▲3	New
Constituency vote	4,314,830	1,059,353
% and swing	10.38% (▼0.23pp)	2.55% (New)
National vote	3,873,955	1,455,886
% and swing	9.53% (▲1.75pp)	3.58% (New)
- Results of the election, showing the winning candidates in each prefecture and the national PR block.
President of the House
of Councillors before election
Yuji Osada
LDP
Elected President of the House
of Councillors
Bunbei Hara
LDP

House of Councillors elections were held in Japan in 1995.

Because of the circumstances of its creation, the opposition party New Frontier Party held seats in the House of Councillors without having won them in the prior election. Many of them were former members of the LDP.

The elections was historic in that the New Frontier Party replaced the Japanese Socialist Party, which had been the largest opposition party for 38 years, and entered coalition with the Liberal Democratic Party. The Socialists lost many seats in this election.

The elections were considered a referendum on the sitting coalition government.

== Results ==
Party	National			Constituency			Seats			
Party	Votes	%	Seats	Votes	%	Seats	Not up	Won	Total after	+/–
New Frontier Party	12,506,322	30.75	18	11,003,681	26.47	22	16	40	56	New
Liberal Democratic Party	11,096,972	27.29	15	10,557,547	25.40	31	61	46	107	+1
Japan Socialist Party	6,882,919	16.92	9	4,926,003	11.85	7	22	16	38	–33
Japanese Communist Party	3,873,955	9.53	5	4,314,830	10.38	3	6	8	14	+3
New Party Sakigake	1,455,886	3.58	2	1,059,353	2.55	1	0	3	3	New
Dainiin Club	1,282,596	3.15	1				1	1	2	0
Sports and Peace Party	541,894	1.33	0				1	0	1	–1
Party for Peace and Citizens	377,786	0.93	0	579,377	1.39	1	1	1	2	New
Democratic Reform Party				1,854,175	4.46	2	0	2	2	–10
Komeito							11	0	11	–13
Other parties	2,649,930	6.52	0	1,158,004	2.79	0	1	0	1	–
Independents				6,120,099	14.72	9	6	9	15	+7
Total	40,668,260	100.00	50	41,573,069	100.00	76	126	126	252	0
Valid votes	40,668,260	94.45		41,573,069	96.51					
Invalid/blank votes	2,391,861	5.55		1,501,654	3.49					
Total votes	43,060,121	100.00		43,074,723	100.00					
Registered voters/turnout	96,759,025	44.50		96,759,025	44.52					
Source: Ministry of Internal Affairs and Communications, Tottori Prefecture, National Diet

=== By constituency ===
Constituency	Total seats	Seats won								
Constituency	Total seats	LDP	NFP	JSP	JCP	NPS	DRP	DC	PPC	Ind.
Aichi	3	1	1							1
Akita	1	1								
Aomori	1		1							
Chiba	2	1	1							
Ehime	1	1								
Fukui	1	1								
Fukuoka	2		1	1						
Fukushima	2	1	1							
Gifu	2	1	1							
Gunma	2	1		1						
Hiroshima	2	1	1							
Hokkaido	2		1	1						
Hyōgo	2	1	1							
Ibaraki	2	1	1							
Ishikawa	1									1
Iwate	1		1							
Kagawa	1	1								
Kagoshima	2	1		1						
Kanagawa	3	1	1	1						
Kōchi	1									1
Kumamoto	2		1							1
Kyoto	2	1					1			
Mie	1									1
Miyagi	2	1								1
Miyazaki	1	1								
Nagano	2		1	1						
Nagasaki	1		1							
Nara	1		1							
Niigata	2	1	1							
Ōita	1			1						
Okinawa	1									1
Okayama	2	1	1							
Osaka	3	1	1		1					
Saga	1	1								
Saitama	3	1	1		1					
Shiga	1					1				
Shimane	1	1								
Shizuoka	2	1	1							
Tochigi	2	1					1			
Tokushima	1	1								
Tokyo	4	1	1		1				1	
Tottori	1									1
Toyama	1	1								
Wakayama	1	1								
Yamagata	1	1								
Yamaguchi	1	1								
Yamanashi	1	1								
National	50	15	18	9	5	2		1		
Total	126	47	40	16	8	3	2	1	1	8
