= Minseito =

Minseito may refer to the following Japanese political parties:

- Constitutional Democratic Party (Japan), 1927–1940
- Good Governance Party, 1998
