= New Party Sakigake =

Former political party in Japan

New Party Sakigake 新党さきがけ Shintō Sakigake
- Founder: Masayoshi Takemura
- Founded: 1993
- Dissolved: 31 October 2004
- Split from: Liberal Democratic Party (Liberal conservative faction); Japan New Party; Socialist Democratic Federation
- Ideology: Liberalism (Japanese); Reformism; Shitsujitsu kokka (Note: Shitsujitsu kokka (a nation of quality and substance) is a political ideal of the New Party Sakigake. According to Shusei Tanaka's remark, it means aiming for high-quality and substantive nation-building.)
- Political position: Centre to centre-left
- Colours: Dark blue (official); Light blue (customary)

The New Party Sakigake (新党さきがけ, Shintō Sakigake), also known as the New Harbinger Party, was a political party in Japan that broke away from the Liberal Democratic Party (LDP) on 22 June 1993. The party was created by Masayoshi Takemura. The party was centrist, and had many reformist and even moderate ecological elements. The theoretical leader was Shusei Tanaka. Yukio Hatoyama and Naoto Kan also took part but later moved to the Democratic Party of Japan.

== History ==
After the 1993 general election, Sakigake joined a Cabinet led by Morihiro Hosokawa. It was the first government without the LDP since 1955. Sakigake's Masayoshi Takemura became Minister. Sakigake supported the following Tsutomu Hata Cabinet, but didn't join the Cabinet.

In 1994, New Party Sakigake took part in the government of Murayama Tomiichi, a government coalition of the LDP and the Japan Socialist Party, which replaced the coalition government headed the previous year by the Japan Renewal Party.

In September 1996, Sakigake and Japan Socialist Party politicians who did not support their respective parties alliances with the LDP broke away to found the Democratic Party of Japan.

The exodus of these liberal members moved the party further to the right. In 1997, the New Party Sakigake had two members in the House of Representatives and three members in the House of Councillors, which was good for them, especially after the LDP became the ruling party again. However, it decided to moderate its stance, and, because of the power of the ecologist and reformist factions, the conservatives decided to reform the party. As part of the ruling coalition in 1998, it had 2 seats in the House of Representatives and 3 in the House of Councillors. In October 1998, the party reformed itself with a more conservative image, dropping the 'New' from its title to become simply the Sakigake Party.

Its popularity heavily declined after that, and by 2001, the party had no seats in either the Lower or Upper House. In 2002, the ecologists took control, and turned the party into an ecologist party. It changed its name to Midori no kaigi, the Environmental Green Political Assembly, which, because it won no seats in the 2004 Parliamentary elections, dissolved itself on 31 October 2004.

The party gained its followers mainly from white collar bureaucrats and ecologists. It was a conservative reformist party with ecological elements.

== Leaders ==
No.	Name	Potrait	Constituency / title	Term of office	
No.	Name	Potrait	Constituency / title	Took office	Left office
Split from: Liberal Democratic Party (liberal-conservative faction)
1	Masayoshi Takemura (1934–2022)		Rep for Shiga 2nd	18 June 1993	30 August 1996
2	Shōici Ide (1939–2018)		Rep for Nagano 2nd	30 August 1996	22 October 1996
–	Akiko Dōmoto (born 1932)		Cou for National PR	30 August 1996	22 October 1996
3 (1)	Masayoshi Takemura (1934–2022)		Rep for Shiga 2nd	6 May 1998	3 July 2000
4	Atsuo Nakamura (born 1940)		Cou for Tokyo at-large	3 July 2000	16 January 2002

== Election results ==
=== House of Representatives ===
House of Representatives
Election	Leader	Seats		Position	Constituency votes		PR block votes		Status
Election	Leader	No.	±	Position	No.	Share	No.	Share	Status
1993	16	13 / 511		8th	1,658,097	2.64%			Governing coalition
1996	15	2 / 500	▼11	▲6th	727,644	1.29%	582,093	1.05%	Governing coalition
2000	12	0 / 480	▼2						Opposition

=== House of Councillors ===
House of Councillors
Election	Seats		Status
Election	Total	Contested	Status
1995	3 / 252	3 / 126	Governing coalition
1998	3 / 252	0 / 126	Opposition
2001	1 / 247	0 / 126	Opposition

== See also ==
- Midori no kaigi
- Politics of Japan
- List of political parties in Japan
- Timeline of liberal parties in Japan
