= Japan Renewal Party =

Japan Renewal Party 新生党 Shinseitō
- Founders: Tsutomu Hata; Ichirō Ozawa
- Founded: 23 June 1993
- Dissolved: 9 December 1994
- Split from: Liberal Democratic Party (Hata faction)
- Merged into: New Frontier Party
- Ideology: Reformism; Conservatism
- Political position: Centre-right

The Japan Renewal Party (新生党, Shinseitō; abbr.: JRP) was a Japanese political party that existed in the early 1990s. It was founded in 1993 by 44 members of the Liberal Democratic Party led by Tsutomu Hata and Ichirō Ozawa. It was instrumental in ending the LDP's 38-year dominance of Japanese politics.

Both reformers, Hata and Ozawa had been involved in a difficult leadership struggle within the former Takeshita faction of the LDP. Their opponents, led by Keizo Obuchi and Ryutaro Hashimoto, were using the fallout of the Sagawa Kyubin scandal as a tool to undermine the reformist position. Hata and Ozawa split from the party partly to shift media attention away from the scandal. In doing so, they transformed an internal party dispute to a wide-ranging conflict that led to a decade of shifting allegiances and short-lived parties.

In the elections immediately following the split, the JRP won 55 seats, making it one of the most powerful opposition parties. Most importantly, the party drew off support crucial to the LDP. While several other small parties had split from the LDP, Hata and Ozawa's group was the largest, and was widely considered to have finally broken the back of LDP dominance.

Known for his political organisational skills, Ozawa organised a five-party coalition of the JRP, the Japan Socialist Party, the Democratic Socialist Party, Komeito and the Socialist Democratic Federation. This coalition held 237 seats in the Diet, and after convincing the Japan New Party and the New Party Sakigake to join, was able to form a government under Morihiro Hosokawa.

As the impetus for the collapse of LDP power, the JRP was able to exert great power in the coalition. While some concessions to other parties were made, the JRP was perhaps overly dominant, eventually forcing some other members out of the coalition through its heavy-handed style. In 1994, the JRP merged into the New Frontier Party.

== Presidents of JRP ==
No.	Name (Birth–death)	Constituency / title	Term of office		Image	Prime Minister (term)
No.	Name (Birth–death)	Constituency / title	Took office	Left office	Image	Prime Minister (term)
Split from: Liberal Democratic Party
1	Tsutomu Hata (1935–2017)	Rep for Nagano 2nd	23 June 1993	9 December 1994		Miyazawa 1991–93
1	Tsutomu Hata (1935–2017)	Rep for Nagano 2nd	23 June 1993	9 December 1994		Hosokawa 1993–94
1	Tsutomu Hata (1935–2017)	Rep for Nagano 2nd	23 June 1993	9 December 1994		himself 1994
1	Tsutomu Hata (1935–2017)	Rep for Nagano 2nd	23 June 1993	9 December 1994		Murayama 1994–96
Successor party: New Frontier Party

== Election results ==
Election	Leader	Votes	%	Seats	Position	Status
1993	Tsutomu Hata	6,341,364	10.10	55 / 511	3rd	Governing coalition
