= Morimitsu Hosokawa =

Japanese potter (born 1972)

- 細川 護光
- Born: 1972 (age 53–54); Tokyo, Japan
- Known for: Pottery
- Spouse: Ai Hosokawa (m. 2009)

Morimitsu Hosokawa (細川 護光, Hosokawa Morimitsu; born 1972) is a Japanese potter.

== Biography ==
Hosokawa was born in Tokyo in 1972 as the son of Morihiro Hosokawa, the former Prime Minister of Japan. The former Prime Minister of Japan, Fumimaro Konoe, is his great-grandfather from his father's side. He was raised in Kumamoto. After studying at junior high school, he went to the United States where he studied at high school and university. After returning to Japan, he transferred to another university in Tokyo. He then studied photography, worked at various part-time jobs and traveled to India.

Hosokawa studied at the kiln in Iga under Masatake Fukumori in 1999. He also collaborated with his father in Yugawara. He opened his own kiln in 2006. In 2008, Hosokawa made his first solo exhibition at Shibunkaku in Kyoto and made subsequent exhibitions there, including one in 2013. He also made exhibitions at the Kakiden Gallery in Shinjuku, Nanohana in Odawara, Mitsukoshi Department Store in Nihonbashi, Tsuruya Department Store in Kumamoto and Tenmaya in Okamoto as well as others. Hosokawa made further studies under Fukumori in 2014 and worked in Raku ware at Yugawara. Along with Fukumori, he visited the United Kingdom in May 2017 to test the clay and a newly built kiln.

== Personal life ==
Morimitsu is married to Ai Hosokawa since 2009. They live in Kumamoto with their daughter.

== Ancestry ==
Ancestors of Morimitsu Hosokawa

16. Morihisa Hosokawa
8. Moritatsu Hosokawa
17. Nabeshima Hiroko
4. Morisada Hosokawa
18. Ikeda Norimasa
9. Hiroko Ikeda
19. Princess Akiko of Kuni
2. Morihiro Hosokawa
20. Konoe Atsumaro
10. Fumimaro Konoe
21. Maeda Sawako
5. Yoshiko Konoe
22. Mori Takanori
11. Chiyoko Mori
23. Ii Takako
1. Morimitsu Hosokawa
3. Kayoko Ueda
