= 1992 Japanese House of Councillors election =

- 23 July 1992

126 of the 252 seats in the House of Councillors 127 seats needed for a majority
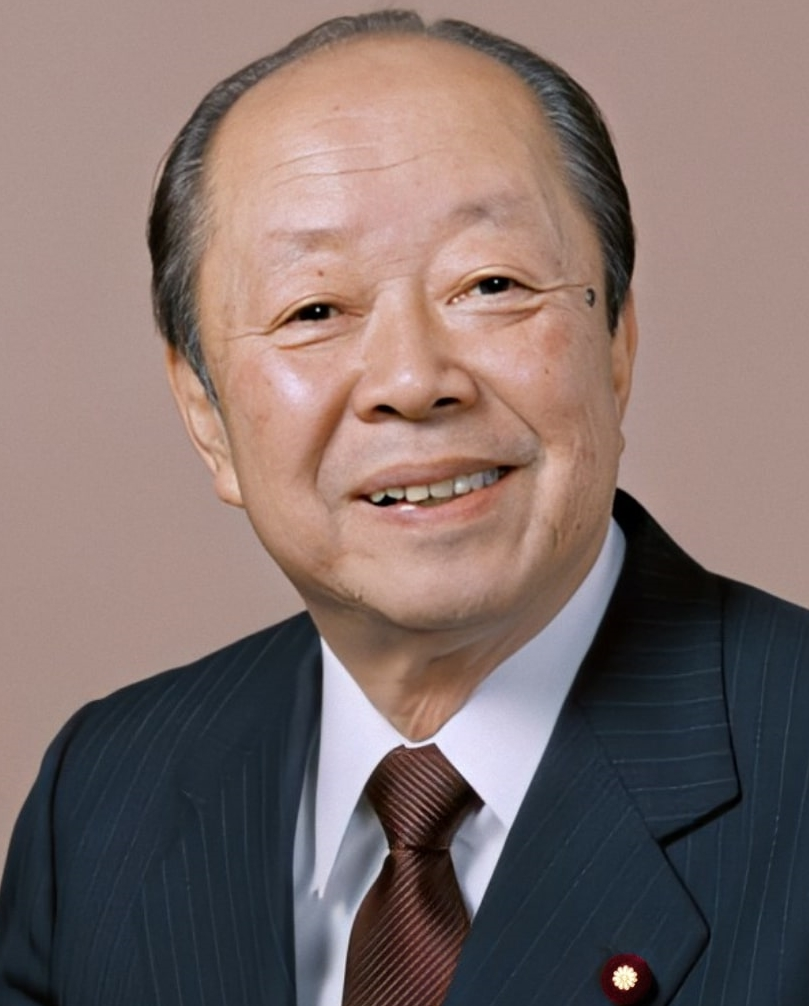

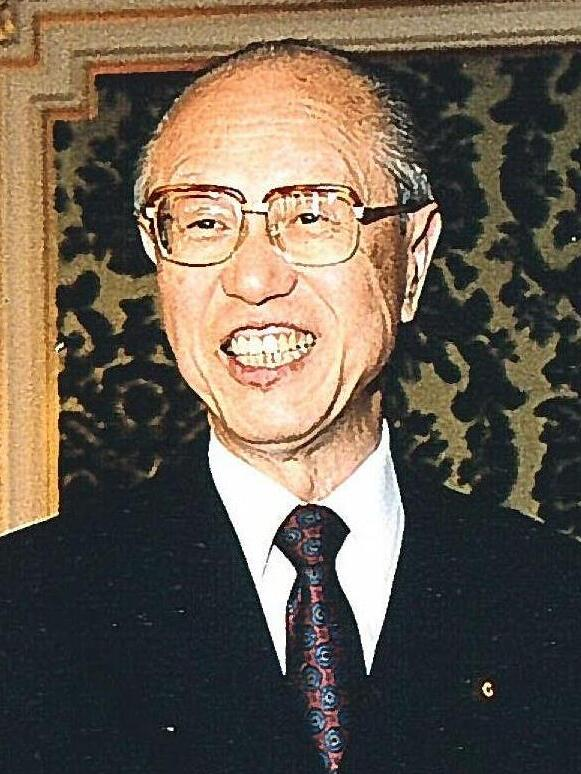

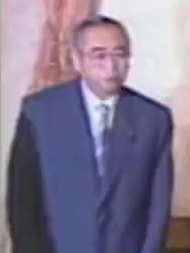

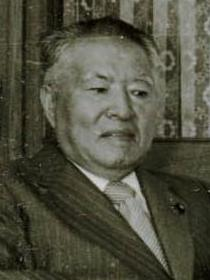

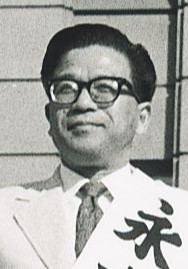

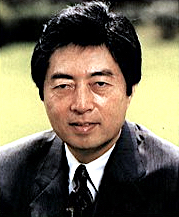
	First party	Second party	Third party
Leader	Kiichi Miyazawa	Makoto Tanabe	Koshiro Ishida
Party	LDP	Socialist	Kōmeitō
Last election	109 seats	66 seats	20 seats
Seats won	67	22	14
Seats after	106	71	24
Seat change	▼3	▲5	▲4
Constituency vote	19,711,047	5,846,238	3,550,060
% and swing	43.43% (▲12.73pp)	12.88% (▼13.50pp)	7.82% (▲2.72pp)
National vote	14,961,199	7,981,726	6,415,503
% and swing	32.97% (▲5.65pp)	17.59% (▼17.46pp)	14.14% (▲3.28pp)
	Fourth party	Fifth party	Sixth party
Leader	Kenji Miyamoto		Eiichi Nagasue
Party	JCP	Rengo no Kai	Democratic Socialist
Last election	14 seats	12 seats	8 seats, 4.9%
Seats won	6	0	4
Seats after	11	12	7
Seat change	▼3	0	▼1
Constituency vote	4,817,001	4,399,684	1,039,980
% and swing	10.61% (▲1.80pp)	9.69% (▲2.87pp)	2.29% (▼1.34pp)
National vote	3,532,956	—	2,255,423
% and swing	7.78% (▲0.74pp)		4.97% (▲0.12pp)
	Seventh party
Leader	Morihiro Hosokawa
Party	New Party
Last election	Did not exist
Seats won	4
Seats after	4
Seat change	New
Constituency vote	—
National vote	3,617,247
% and swing	7.97% (New)
- Results of the election, showing the winning candidates in each prefecture and the national PR block.
President of the House
of Councillors before election
Yuji Osada
LDP
Elected President of the House
of Councillors
Bunbei Hara
LDP

House of Councillors elections were held in Japan in 1992. Only half of the seats in the House of Councillors were up for election.

== Results ==
Party	National			Constituency			Seats			
Party	Votes	%	Seats	Votes	%	Seats	Not up	Won	Total after	+/–
Liberal Democratic Party	14,961,199	32.97	19	19,711,047	43.43	48	39	67	106	–3
Japan Socialist Party	7,981,726	17.59	10	5,846,238	12.88	12	49	22	71	+5
Kōmeitō	6,415,503	14.14	8	3,550,060	7.82	6	10	14	24	+4
Japan New Party	3,617,247	7.97	4				0	4	4	New
Japanese Communist Party	3,532,956	7.78	4	4,817,001	10.61	2	5	6	11	–3
Democratic Socialist Party	2,255,423	4.97	3	1,039,980	2.29	1	3	4	7	–1
Sports and Peace Party	1,375,791	3.03	1				1	1	2	+1
Dainiin Club	1,321,639	2.91	1				1	1	2	0
Rengo no Kai				4,399,684	9.69	0	12	0	12	0
Other parties	3,921,722	8.64	0	1,573,400	3.47	2	2	2	4	–
Independent				4,445,795	9.80	5	3	5	8	–7
Vacant						1	0	1	1	–
Total	45,383,206	100.00	50	45,383,205	100.00	77	125	127	252	0
Valid votes	45,383,206	95.98		45,383,205	95.95					
Invalid/blank votes	1,900,566	4.02		1,913,874	4.05					
Total votes	47,283,772	100.00		47,297,079	100.00					
Registered voters/turnout	93,254,025	50.70		93,254,025	50.72					
Source: Ministry of Internal Affairs and Communications, Tottori Prefecture, National Diet

=== By constituency ===
Constituency	Total seats	Seats won									
Constituency	Total seats	LDP	JSP	Kōmeitō	JCP	JNP	DSP	SPP	DC	Others	Ind.
Aichi	3	1		1			1				
Akita	1	1									
Aomori	1	1									
Chiba	2	1	1								
Ehime	1	1									
Fukui	1	1									
Fukuoka	3	1	1	1							
Fukushima	2	2									
Gifu	1	1									
Gunma	2	2									
Hiroshima	2	1								1	
Hokkaido	4	1	1	1							1
Hyōgo	3	1	1	1							
Ibaraki	2	1	1								
Ishikawa	1	1									
Iwate	1	1									
Kagawa	1	1									
Kagoshima	2	1	1								
Kanagawa	2	1	1								
Kōchi	1										1
Kumamoto	2	1									1
Kyoto	2	1			1						
Mie	1	1									
Miyagi	1	1									
Miyazaki	1	1									
Nagano	2	1	1								
Nagasaki	1	1									
Nara	1	1									
Niigata	2	1	1								
Ōita	1	1									
Okinawa	1									1	
Okayama	2	1	1								
Osaka	3	1		1							1
Saga	1	1									
Saitama	3	2	1								
Shiga	1	1									
Shimane	1	1									
Shizuoka	2	1	1								
Tochigi	2	2									
Tokushima	1	1									
Tokyo	4	1		1	1						1
Tottori	1	1									
Toyama	1	1									
Wakayama	1	1									
Yamagata	1	1									
Yamaguchi	1	1									
Yamanashi	1	1									
National	50	19	10	8	4	4	3	1	1		
Total	127	68	22	14	6	4	4	1	1	2	5
