= Ichirō Ozawa =

Japanese politician (born 1942)

- 小沢 一郎
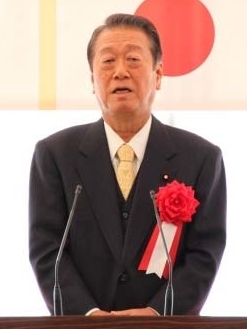
- Ozawa in 2013

President of the Democratic Party of Japan
- In office 7 April 2006 – 16 May 2009
- Preceded by: Seiji Maehara
- Succeeded by: Yukio Hatoyama

President of the New Frontier Party
- In office 28 December 1995 – 31 December 1997
- Preceded by: Toshiki Kaifu
- Succeeded by: Position abolished

Deputy Chief Cabinet Secretary (Political affairs)
- In office 6 November 1987 – 3 June 1989
- Prime Minister: Noboru Takeshita
- Preceded by: Hideo Watanabe
- Succeeded by: Takamori Makino

Minister of Home Affairs
- In office 28 December 1985 – 22 July 1986
- Prime Minister: Yasuhiro Nakasone
- Preceded by: Tōru Furuya
- Succeeded by: Nobuyuki Hanashi
Party political offices
President of the People's Life Party
In office 25 January 2013 – 27 April 2019
Preceded by	Yuko Mori
Succeeded by	Position abolished
President of People's Life First
In office 11 July 2012 – 16 December 2012
Preceded by	Position established
Succeeded by	Position abolished
President of the Liberal Party
In office 1 January 1998 – 26 September 2003
Preceded by	Position established
Succeeded by	Position abolished
Secretary-General of the Liberal Democratic Party
In office August 1989 – April 1991
President	Toshiki Kaifu
Preceded by	Ryutaro Hashimoto
Succeeded by	Keizō Obuchi

Member of the House of Representatives
- In office 27 December 1969 – 23 January 2026
- Preceded by: Saeki Ozawa
- Succeeded by: Takashi Fujiwara
- Constituency: Iwate 2nd (1969–1996); Iwate 4th (1996–2017); Iwate 3rd (2017–2021); Tohoku PR (2021–2024); Iwate 3rd (2024–2026)

Personal details
- Born: 24 May 1942 (age 84) Taitō, Tokyo, Japan
- Party: CRA (since 2026)
- Other political affiliations: LDP (before 1993); JRP (1993–1994); NFP (1994–1998); LP (1998–2003); DPJ (2003–2012); PLF (2012); TPJ (2012); PLP (2012–2019); DPP (2019–2020); CDP (2020–2026)
- Parent: Saeki Ozawa (father)
- Education: Keio University; Nihon University
- Website: Personal website

Ichirō Ozawa (小沢一郎, Ozawa Ichirō; born 24 May 1942) is a Japanese politician who served as a member of the House of Representatives from 1969 to 2026, notable for his central role in the two occasions the Liberal Democratic Party lost control of the government, in 1993 and 2009. He is often dubbed the "shadow shogun" due to his back-room influence.

He was initially a member of the Liberal Democratic Party (LDP), serving as its secretary general from 1989 to 1991. He left the LDP in 1993 and subsequently served as head of a number of other political parties, first by co-founding the Japan Renewal Party with Tsutomu Hata, which formed a short-lived coalition government with several other parties opposed to the LDP. Ozawa later served as president of the opposition New Frontier Party from 1995 to 1997, president of the Liberal Party from 1998 to 2003 (which was part of a coalition government with the LDP of Keizō Obuchi from 1999 to 2000), president of the opposition Democratic Party of Japan (DPJ) from 2006 to 2009 and secretary-general of the DPJ in government from 2009 to 2010.

In July 2012 he left the DPJ with around fifty followers to found the People's Life First party in a protest against the DPJ's plan to raise the Japanese consumption tax. Ozawa's party merged with the newly founded Tomorrow Party of Japan of Shiga governor Yukiko Kada prior to the 2012 general election, in which the party performed poorly. Ozawa and his followers then left to form the Life Party.

Ozawa was defeated in the 2026 election amidst the LDP's landslide victory, leaving the diet after 57 years.

== Early life and youth ==
Ozawa was born in Tokyo on 24 May 1942. His father, Saeki, was a self-made lawyer, businessman and politician from a farmer's family in Iwate Prefecture. He served on the Tokyo City council and prefectural assembly at the time of Ozawa's birth. Due to American air raids on Tokyo, the family moved to Saeki's hometown Mizusawa. After the war, Saeki was elected to the House of Representatives from Iwate and rose through cabinet positions under Prime Minister Shigeru Yoshida. He became a heavyweight in the early Liberal Democratic Party.

While Saeki spent most of his time in Tokyo, his family lived in Mizusawa. Ozawa's mother Michi came from a wealthy landowning family. She played an active role in managing her husband's local political base while raising Ozawa. At fourteen, Ozawa moved to his father in Tokyo to attend preparatory school.

The young Ozawa showed no strong interest in politics and his father did not push him to become a politician. For a time he wanted to become an officer in the Japan Self-Defense Forces, but he ultimately decided to become a lawyer. Ozawa attended Keio University, graduating in 1967, and pursued postgraduate studies in law at Nihon University, his father's alma mater. While Ozawa was studying for the bar exam, his father died of heart failure in May 1968.

== Political career ==
=== Tanaka faction (1969–1987) ===
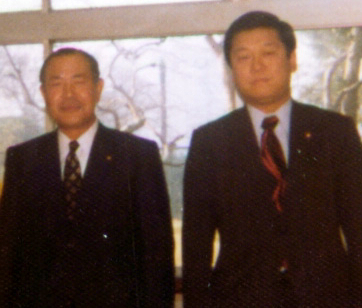
Ozawa with Kakuei Tanaka

After his father's death, Ozawa ran for his father's seat in the 1969 general election, winning the seat at the age of 27. He held the seat, now known as the Iwate 4th district, until the 2021 general election, winning fourteen re-elections over more than four decades. Shortly after his initial election, he was diagnosed with thyroid cancer, temporarily lost his voice and considered resigning from politics, but he made a full recovery after undergoing surgery.

Ozawa joined the political faction led by Kakuei Tanaka, which then supported Prime Minister Eisaku Satō. Ozawa became one of Tanaka's closest allies in the Diet. After Tanaka was charged in the Lockheed bribery scandals, Ozawa was the only faction member who attended each of Tanaka's 191 court dates; Ozawa later commented that "the man in power of the day, who took care of me, was made to sit on a bench all day long and I couldn't bear if he was there alone with nobody around;" he also characterized Tanaka as a "scapegoat" on the basis that other politicians were involved in similar activity.

Ozawa was appointed to lead the LDP's election strategy in the 1983 general election, the first to employ a closed list system, and led the effort to elect Sadakazu Tanigaki and Hiromu Nonaka to fill open seats representing Kyoto Prefecture. By the 1980s, he became one of the popular young leaders in the LDP, along with Tsutomu Hata and Ryutaro Hashimoto, both of whom were later elected as prime ministers, in the Tanaka/Takeshita faction. His rivalry with Hashimoto was particularly prominent, being dubbed the Ichi-Ryu War by the press.

After long service on key parliamentary committees, Ozawa's first ministerial appointment was in 1985 when he took on the Home Affairs portfolio under Yasuhiro Nakasone. Prime Minister Yasuhiro Nakasone was impressed with his negotiation skills, particularly his ability to persuade opposition parties to pass difficult consumption tax legislation. Ozawa's skill in behind-the-scenes maneuvers led to a meteoric rise in power within the LDP, although there were also many factions who turned against him. Senior leaders resented having to appeal to the much younger Ozawa for support. (Kiichi Miyazawa, twenty years his senior, once addressed Ozawa as "Great Secretary General" in a leadership meeting). Ozawa's reputation for organisation was soon matched by his reputation as a young upstart.

=== Takeshita faction (1987–1993) ===
Ozawa joined the group led by Noboru Takeshita that left the Tanaka faction in 1987, shortly before Kakuei Tanaka suffered a stroke and was incapacitated. He became one of the key members of the faction, along with Keizo Obuchi and Ryutaro Hashimoto, both of whom later served as prime ministers.

Ozawa became vice chairman of the Takeshita faction under Shin Kanemaru's leadership, and became LDP Secretary General from 1989 to 1991. By 1991 Takeshita, Kanemaru and Ozawa were considered the three strongest members of the faction. However, Ozawa was hurt by a poor LDP showing in the Tokyo gubernatorial election of 1991 as well as heart problems that surfaced around that time.

Kanemaru stepped down in 1992, and Ozawa backed finance minister Tsutomu Hata to replace him. The faction's eight member steering committee nominated Obuchi as chairman by a 5–0 vote, with Ozawa and two of his supporters having boycotted the meeting. Obuchi proposed reducing the faction leader's degree of control over the faction in an attempt to keep Ozawa within the faction, but Ozawa began to plan his departure.

=== Split from the LDP (1993–1998) ===
In 1993, Ozawa and Hata left the LDP to form the splinter Japan Renewal Party, seriously destabilising the LDP and leading to the ending its 38–year dominance of Japanese politics. Ozawa was extremely successful in luring LDP members to the Renewal Party, causing the LDP to lose its majority in the Diet. In keeping with his previous LDP role, Ozawa became the behind-the-scenes power broker of the large coalition that took power in the wake of the LDP split.

While Ozawa and Hata were the most experienced administrators, they decided to name Morihiro Hosokawa, leader of the Japan New Party, as coalition leader. This was done both as a gesture of neutrality to the other coalition members, and as a means of keeping Hata in the wings as a future option if Hosokawa proved unsuccessful. While Hosokawa served as Prime Minister, Ozawa was recognised as the major political force in the coalition. He capitalised on his reputation in 1993 by publishing a clear statement of his principles in the book Blueprint for a New Japan (日本改造計画, Nihon Kaizō Keikaku). The book called for political, legal and military reform to transform Japan into what Ozawa called a "normal nation." Strong ideological consistency was uncommon in Japanese politicians, and the book had considerable impact.

Ozawa's insistence on a more assertive role for Japan in international affairs caused friction with members of the Japan Socialist Party in the coalition. Eventually, the Socialists left to form a coalition with the LDP, leaving Tsutomu Hata in charge of a minority government that fell in June 1994. Many, including Hata, blamed Ozawa for the loss. Ozawa himself began to move into the public eye, especially with the arrival of the New Frontier Party. Former Prime Minister Toshiki Kaifu had founded the New Frontier Party in 1994. After joining the coalition, it became a catch-all party for the merger of several smaller parties.

After a bitter leadership struggle in 1995, Ozawa took over the party, just as his old rival Ryutaro Hashimoto was assuming leadership of the LDP. Most commentators believed that a new Ichi-Ryu War would finally provide a genuinely competitive two-party system in Japanese politics. Under Ozawa, the NFP made the second-strongest showing in the 1996 general election. However, the New Frontier Party was already beginning to unravel. Ozawa's autocratic leadership style alienated many of his former allies, and even Tsutomu Hata, disillusioned after his leadership battle with Ozawa, seceded to form the Sun Party in 1996. By 1998, so many had abandoned Ozawa that he announced the dissolution of the New Frontier Party.

=== Liberal Party (1998–2002) ===
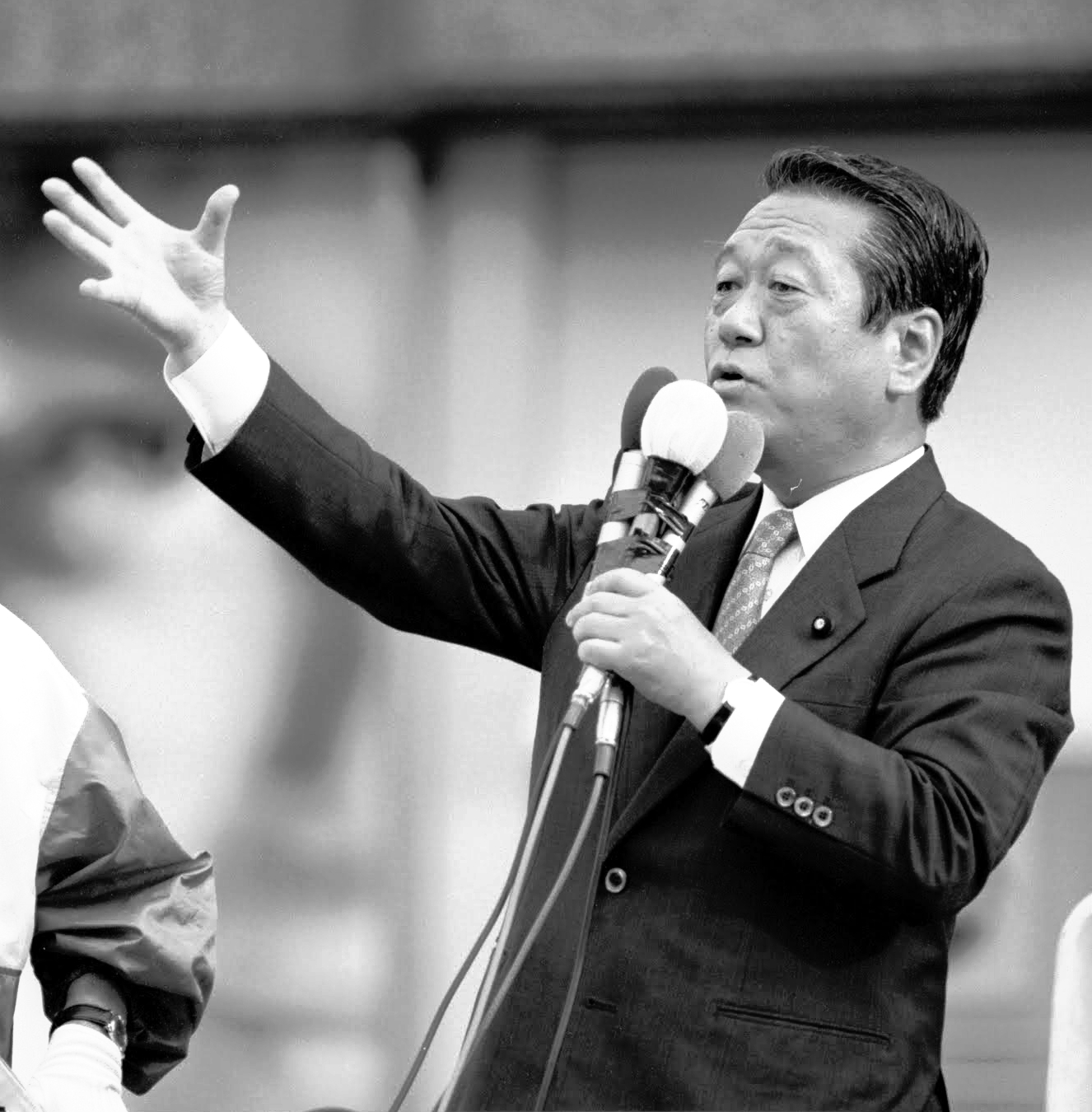
Making a campaign speech for members of the Liberal Party in Hokkaido on 18 July 2001

Upon the dissolution of the New Frontier Party, Ozawa took his remaining followers to found the Liberal Party. The Liberal Party formed a coalition with the LDP in 1999 to support Keizō Obuchi as prime minister. Obuchi began negotiating a future merger of the Liberal Party with the LDP. The idea of Ozawa returning was met with mixed reaction in the LDP. The YKK partnership of Taku Yamasaki, Junichiro Koizumi and Koichi Kato was strongly opposed to Ozawa, along with anti-reformer Hiromu Nonaka. Powerful faction leader Shizuka Kamei supported Ozawa, chiefly due to similar views on military reform. Eventually, Ozawa's enemies were successful in blocking the merger.

=== Democratic Party of Japan (2002–2012) ===
Shut out of the LDP, Ozawa and his party joined the Democratic Party of Japan prior to the 2003 general election, reuniting with his old ally Tsutomu Hata under DPJ president Naoto Kan.

In 2004, Ozawa was affected by a pension scandal. Although cleared of any legal wrongdoing, he stepped down from the DPJ leadership elections, in which he had been unopposed. This forced Katsuya Okada to assume leadership of the party. Okada resigned after his party suffered dramatic losses against the increasingly popular Prime Minister Junichiro Koizumi in the September 2005 general election, and his successor Seiji Maehara resigned in April 2006. Ozawa was elected president again on 7 April. The Economist called Ozawa an "increasingly ineffectual bully" in July 2007 and partially blamed him both for enervating reformists in his own party and for DPJ failure to profit from LDP predicaments.

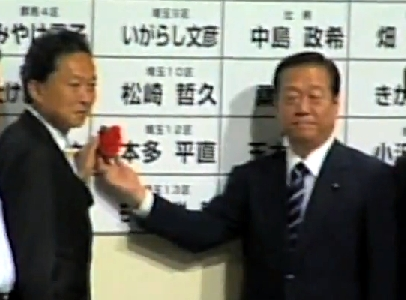
Ozawa celebrates with Yukio Hatoyama (left) at the Laforet Museum, Roppongi on the day of the DPJ's election victory, 30 August 2009

Nonetheless, Ozawa led the party to its largest victory in history in the upper house election on 29 July 2007. On 4 November 2007, Ozawa announced he would resign as leader of the DPJ, after a controversial proposal made by Prime Minister Yasuo Fukuda about a grand coalition between the DPJ and the ruling LDP. He brought the proposal to a meeting of the DPJ leadership, which rejected it. He faced criticism for failing to immediately reject the proposal. At a news conference, he said that he took responsibility for this political turmoil. He also said that he was not leaving the party. There was speculation that the proposal originally came from Ozawa. However, Ozawa denied the press speculation except the Asahi Shimbun and the Nihon Keizai Shimbun, and he said that they manipulated public opinion. It was reported that the power broker of the proposal was Yomiuri Shimbun's executive director Tsuneo Watanabe. On 6 November 2007, he retracted his resignation offer after he was asked to stay on as leader by senior party officials and members.

The DPJ re-elected Ozawa as party leader for the third time on 21 September 2008. Ozawa stated on this occasion: "I will do my best, considering this is my last chance to put an end to the LDP-led government and bring about a government that puts a priority on people's lives." He was also announced by Secretary-General Yukio Hatoyama to have decided to switch from Iwate Constituency No. 4 to Tokyo Constituency No. 12 at the next House of Representatives election. On 24 September 2008, the House of Councillors, controlled by the DPJ, elected Ozawa as Prime Minister; however, the House of Representatives, controlled by the LDP, elected Taro Aso instead, overrode the upper house's decision.

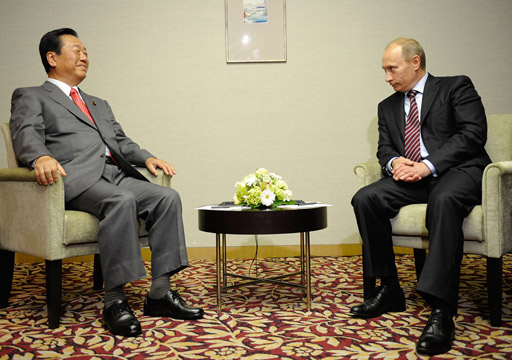
With Vladimir Putin (right) in Tokyo on 12 May 2009

In 2009, Ozawa became implicated in the falsification of political funding reports on 400 million yen of campaign donations to his political organization. He resigned as DPJ president in May 2009, while the investigation was still ongoing, and was succeeded by Yukio Hatoyama. Nonetheless, during the August 2009 general election, Ozawa acted as the DPJ's chief election strategist and remained a very powerful figure in the party. The DPJ won an overwhelming victory in the 2009 election and Hatoyama became prime minister, and it was believed that Ozawa's influence would increase further.

The investigation into Ozawa's finances continued despite the DPJ's victory. By January 2010, two of Ozawa's aides had been arrested and one poll found 70% public support for forcing Ozawa to leave office. A prosecution inquest panel concluded in April that "it is highly likely that Ozawa is an accomplice and should therefore stand trial." Hatoyama and Ozawa announced their resignations as president and secretary general of the DPJ in June, due in part to the scandal as well as Hatoyama's failure to keep a campaign pledge regarding US military bases in Okinawa. Their resignations were intended to save the DPJ's chances in the House of Councillors election later that year.

Ozawa was formally indicted in January 2011 for his involvement in the scandal. The Tokyo District Court rejected most of the depositions taken by prosecutors in the case on procedural grounds, and Ozawa was eventually acquitted in April. Prosecutors appealed the case to the Tokyo High Court, which upheld Ozawa's acquittal in November 2012.

=== Post-DPJ (2012–present) ===
After a disagreement with DPJ prime minister Yoshihiko Noda over a rise in the consumption tax, Ozawa left the DPJ along with 49 other lawmakers in July 2012. Later that month he formed the People's Life First (PLF) party, which became the third largest party in the lower house of the Japanese Parliament. The focus of the new party was to reduce Japan's reliance on nuclear power and to oppose the consumption tax increase.

Shortly before the 2012 general election, Ozawa and the members of PLF merged with the newly founded Tomorrow Party of Japan of Shiga governor Yukiko Kada. The party went into the election with 12 members in the upper house and 61 in the lower house, but performed poorly, with only nine members in the lower house being re-elected. The upper house members were not up for re-election.

Tensions grew within the party and on 29 December 2012 the Ozawa group split from the TPJ and formed the Life Party while suggesting continued corroboration between both parties. Tomoko Abe remained the only TPJ diet member, meaning that the TPJ could not maintain official party status in the diet, which requires five members. Abe and Kada sounded out Green Wind, which has four Diet members, over a possible merger, but the talks were not successful. After the Shiga prefectural assembly passed a resolution requesting Kada to stop doubling as governor and the head of the TPJ, she resigned as head of the party on 4 January 2013.

Long after he last held an influential party post, Ozawa remains widely respected in opposition circles. He is still frequently consulted by opposition party leaders for electoral and campaign strategy against the long-ruling LDP.

On 26 April 2019, Ozawa agreed to merge the Liberal Party into the Democratic Party for the People, which in turn merged into the Constitutional Democratic Party in 2020.

In the 2021 general election, Ozawa's 53-year-long reign in Iwate Prefecture's local electoral constituencies came to end after he was defeated by LDP opponent Takashi Fujiwara, who beat Ozawa with a 4.1% margin of victory. This came after Ozawa won in 2017 with a 14.84% margin of victory. Nonetheless, he did manage to stay in the House of Representatives through the Tohoku PR block.

In November 2023, Ozawa publicly said of CDP's leader Kenta Izumi that "It would be better if he resigns (as representative)" following a statement by Izumi that he aimed to change the government within the next five years, with Ozawa criticizing the words and stating that "What will the people think if the main opposition party says it won't aim for the government? No one will support it." Earlier in the same year, he founded a parliamentary faction inside the CDP, leading to the belief that Ozawa is looking to build up his influence again in preparation of another opposition leadership election.

He has stated that, in light of the 2023–2024 Japanese slush fund scandal, people should not discount Prime Minister Fumio Kishida, saying that "You have to be careful. You can't let your guard down. Mr. Nikai is gone, the Seiwa-kai is in shreds, and the Secretary-General is useless. Why are you dissolving the House of Representatives right away when you are certain that you will be re-elected as President? There may be a disbandment in the fall after re-election. Before that happens, he may go to North Korea for the publicity."

Ozawa has also proven to be a critic of party leader Kenta Izumi, who he describes as "unserious". He has described the need for election cooperation with the Japanese Communist Party, citing the need for a unification of opposition parties. He endorsed a former political opponent, Yoshihiko Noda, for leader of the CDP in 2024. After Noda was elected he made Ozawa his deputy in the Election Campaign Headquarters, putting Ozawa in a key position in preparing for the October 2024 general election. Ozawa won back his district in Iwate during the election, which saw the incumbent LDP-Komeito coalition lose its majority in the House of Representatives.

Following the merger of the Constitutional Democratic Party with Komeito, Ozawa ran for a twentieth term in the House of Representatives as a member of the Centrist Reform Alliance in the 2026 general election. He faced a grueling battle due to Sanae Takaichi's immense popularity and ultimately lost the Diet seat he had held for 57 years.

== Views ==
Formerly known as a conservative politician in the LDP, he now takes liberal stances on domestic and international policies. The wide political spectrum in the Democratic Party forced Ozawa to take eclectic approaches, which has become a main source for criticism against him. Aside from his policies, he is also criticised for his aggressive power game tendencies in the reorganisation of Japanese political parties in the 1990s. Some critics accuse him of being an opportunist, and point to his repeated party movements. His defenders say that in the relatively ideology-free landscape of Japanese politics, it is his adherence to principle that forces him into conflict with others.

=== Constitution ===
Following its surrender on 2 September 1945, the Empire of Japan was deprived of sovereignty by the Allies, and the Meiji Constitution was suspended. During the Occupation of Japan, the Meiji Constitution was replaced by a new document, the postwar Constitution of Japan, which replaced the imperial rule with a form of Western-style liberal democracy. Ozawa claims that the Constitution of Japan is not a just constitution and that it is invalid. Ozawa pointed out Japan's diplomatic disability in international affairs, particularly revealed in the Gulf War in 1990.

=== Foreign relations ===
Ozawa expressed admiration for American democracy and praised Americans for electing Barack Obama as president in an August 2010 speech, but he also labeled Americans as "monocellular" or "simple-minded" (単細胞 tan saibō). In the same speech, Ozawa said, "I don't like British people."

Ozawa characterized the War in Afghanistan as an American fight that "had nothing to do with the United Nations or the international community." Ozawa published an article in the leftist monthly political magazine Sekai in October 2007, stating his intention to deploy the Japan Self-Defense Forces as part of the UN-mandated International Security Assistance Force (ISAF) to Afghanistan if he ever assumes power in the new cabinet. The article was published as a rebuttal to a UN political officer who criticised Ozawa's position to oppose Japan's continual support of the maritime interdiction forces in the Indian Ocean. The article was published with the intent to provide a viable alternative to the government's plan to continue stationing the Maritime Defense Forces for logistical support of Operation Enduring Freedom in Afghanistan. However, faced with mounting criticism from both sides of the political spectrum, Ozawa later softened his statement and explained that his intent was to deploy the GSDF (Ground Self-Defense Forces) for logistical support of the civilian component of ISAF, presumably suggesting the PRT or Provincial Reconstruction Team which is a civil-military cooperation unit that works on reconstruction efforts in the provincial areas of Afghanistan. On 24 February 2008, he stated that only the United States Seventh Fleet should be based in Japan. His remarks drew criticism from members of both the LDP and DPJ.

=== Christianity ===
In November 2009, while visiting the president of the Japan Buddhist Federation, Ozawa declared that Christianity is an "exclusive and self-righteous religion" and that "European and U.S. societies with a background of Christianity are bogged down". He also stated that Islam "is better than Christianity but it is also exclusive."

=== Economics ===
He supports deregulation, neoliberalism and anti-keynesianism.

== Personal life ==
Ozawa married Kazuko Fukuda, the daughter of a wealthy Tanaka supporter. With Kazuko, Ozawa fathered three sons who were raised in Iwate Prefecture. In June 2012, the magazine Shukan Bunshun published a letter from Kazuko stating that the couple would divorce, alleging that "Ozawa ran away with his secretaries because of fear of radiation" in the wake of the Fukushima disaster of March 2011.

Political offices
Preceded by Tōru Furuya	Minister of Home Affairs; 1985–1986	Succeeded by Nobuyuki Hanashi
Preceded by Tōru Furuya	Chairman of the National Public Safety Commission; 1985–1986	Succeeded by Nobuyuki Hanashi
Preceded by Hideo Watanabe	Deputy Chief Cabinet Secretary; 1987–1989	Succeeded by Takamori Makino
Party political offices
Preceded by Ryutaro Hashimoto	Secretary-General of the Liberal Democratic Party; 1989–1991	Succeeded by Keizō Obuchi
New political party	Secretary-General of the New Frontier Party; 1994–1995	Succeeded by Takashi Yonezawa
Preceded by Toshiki Kaifu	President of the New Frontier Party; 1995–1997	Party dissolved
New political party	President of the Liberal Party; 1998–2003	Merged into Democratic Party
Preceded by Seiji Maehara	President of the Democratic Party; 2006–2009	Succeeded by Yukio Hatoyama
Preceded by Katsuya Okada	Secretary General of the Democratic Party; 2009–2010	Succeeded by Yukio Edano
House of Representatives (Japan)
New constituency	Member of the House of Representatives for Iwate; 1996–	Incumbent
