= Shūkichi Tsujimura =

Japanese photographer

Shūkichi Tsujimura (辻村修吉, Tsujimura Shūkichi; 1910–1991) was a Japanese photographer.
