= Sekai Nippo =

Japanese language newspaper

世界日報 THE SEKAINIPPO
- Type: Daily newspaper
- Format: Broadsheet
- Owner(s): Sekai Nippo Co., Ltd.
- President: Toshiyuki Hayakawa (President & CEO)
- Founded: January 1, 1975
- Language: Japanese
- Website: https://www.worldtimes.co.jp/

Sekai Nippo (世界日報) is a Japanese language newspaper. Its headquarters is in Nihonbashi Kayabacho, Chuo-ku, Tokyo. Long associated with the Unification Church, the newspaper was first published on January 1, 1975 with funding from the church and International Federation for Victory over Communism. Until 1983 all staff members were Unification Church members and financial losses were filled in with church funding.

The daily newspaper was distributed in certain areas of the Kanto region and on the main island of Okinawa. (Note: In the Okinawa Island, except for some locally printed newspapers, daily newspapers from the Tokyo headquarters, including this one, are transported by air and sold or delivered in the afternoon or later on the same day.)

In addition to the daily newspaper, a nationwide weekly paper, Sunday Sekai Nippo, was launched in 1991. There is also a monthly publication called Viewpoint. Furthermore, in 2000, it became the first commercial comprehensive daily newspaper in Japan to launch an electronic newspaper service. The daily, weekly, and monthly editions are all available in digital format.

Since October 1, 2023, the newspaper has ceased publication on Sundays and is now issued six days a week. On June 30, 2026, the newspaper announced its suspension of all physical distribution and began digital publishing only.
