= Sports and Peace Party =

Sports And Peace Party スポーツ平和党
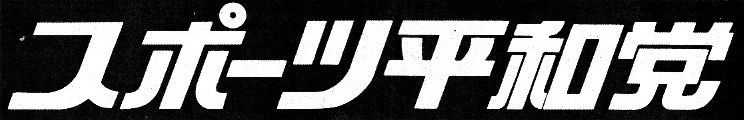
- Founder: Antonio Inoki
- Founded: 23 June 1989
- Registered: until 17 July 1998
- Dissolved: 18 June 2006
- Headquarters: 107-0061; 5-7 Kita Aoyama, Minato-ku, Tokyo (at the time of dissolution)
- Ideology: Sport politics World peace

The Sports and Peace Party (Japanese: スポーツ平和党, romanized: Supōtsu Heiwa Tō) was a political party in Japan run by Antonio Inoki, a pro wrestler and former member of the House of Councillors. He continued to wrestle and promote while serving as a legislator. The party fielded 10 candidates in the 1989 election.

Inoki met with Saddam Hussein for the release of prisoners from Iraq before the Gulf War. As is the traditional gift for a visiting head-of-state, Saddam gave Inoki a pair of golden swords.

He served in the Diet until 1995, when he failed to win re-election, after accusations of Yakuza involvement and bribery lead to a decline in his popularity. His party, however, also fielded candidates in 1998.

== History ==
The party was formed in 1989 by wrestler Antonio Inoki. In the upper house election of 1989, Inoki was elected as a member of the House of Councillors via the PR Block system. In the 1992 Upper House election, Emoto Mengaki, who was active as a pitcher of the Nankai Hawks and the Hanshin Tigers in the 1970s, ran for the first place in the proportional district name list and was elected to the House of Councillors.

== Election results ==
=== House of Councillors ===
| Election | Leader | Constituency | | | Party list | | | Seats | Status |
| Election | Leader | Votes | % | Seats | Votes | % | Seats | Seats | Status |
|---|---|---|---|---|---|---|---|---|---|
| 1989 | Antonio Inoki | —N/a | | | 993,989 | 1.77 | 1 / 50 | 1 / 252 | Opposition |
| 1992 | Antonio Inoki | —N/a | | | 1,375,791 | 3.03 | 1 / 50 | 2 / 252 | Opposition |
| 1995 | Antonio Inoki | —N/a | | | 541,894 | 1.33 | 1 / 50 | 1 / 252 | Opposition |
| 1998 | Iichi Nishime | 72,886 | 0.13 | 0 / 76 | 477,284 | 0.85 | 0 / 50 | 0 / 252 | Extra-parliamentary opposition |
