= New Fraternity Party =

Former political party in Japan

New Fraternity Party 新党友愛 Shintō Yūai
- President: Kansei Nakano
- Founder: Kansei Nakano
- Founded: 1 January 1998
- Dissolved: 27 April 1998
- Split from: New Frontier Party
- Merged into: Democratic Party of Japan
- Ideology: Pro-Minsha kyōkai Yūai ideology
- Political position: Centre

Website
- www.shinto-yuuai.com (Archived 11 November 1998)

The New Fraternity Party (新党友愛, Shintō Yūai) was a Japanese political party that existed in early 1998. It was founded by Diet members that broke away from the New Frontier Party in January 1998. The party has political roots in Minsha kyōkai, and Minsha kyōkai is now the main political factions of the centrist DPP.

The name has its origins in the Taishō period democratic movements, which used the word yūai (fraternity) as a motto. The party also claimed that yūai had a phonetic similarity to the English "you and I", representing their hope of cooperating with ordinary Japanese.

The party was led by Lower House member Kansei Nakano, now a member of the Democratic Party.

In April 1998, the New Fraternity Party merged with the Good Governance Party, the previous Democratic Party (1996) and the Democratic Reform Party (民主改革連合, Minshu-Kaikaku-Rengō) to form the brand-new Democratic Party (1998).

== Presidents of NFP ==
| No. | Name | Image | Term of office | |
| No. | Name | Image | Took office | Left office |
|---|---|---|---|---|
Preceding parties: New Frontier Party
| 1 | Kansei Nakano | | 5 January 1998 | 24 April 1998 |
Successor party: Democratic Party (1998)

== See also ==
- Democratic Socialist Party (Japan)
