= Morihiro Hosokawa =

Prime Minister of Japan from 1993 to 1994

- 細川 護熙
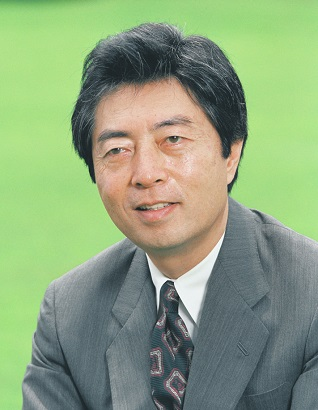
- Official portrait, 1993

Prime Minister of Japan
- In office 9 August 1993 – 28 April 1994
- Monarch: Akihito
- Deputy: Tsutomu Hata
- Preceded by: Kiichi Miyazawa
- Succeeded by: Tsutomu Hata

Leader of the New Party
- In office 22 May 1992 – 9 December 1994
- Preceded by: Party established
- Succeeded by: Party abolished

Governor of Kumamoto Prefecture
- In office 11 February 1983 – 10 February 1991
- Monarchs: Hirohito; Akihito
- Preceded by: Issei Sawada
- Succeeded by: Joji Fukushima

Member of the House of Representatives
- In office 18 July 1993 – 7 May 1998
- Preceded by: Shōichi Tanaka
- Succeeded by: Eiichi Iwashita
- Constituency: Former Kumamoto 1st (Note: Between 1947 and 1996, Hosakawa's constituency was a multi-member district elected through SNTV. After the 1994 Japanese electoral reform, mandating the abolition of all multi-member House of Representative district, Hosakawa was re-elected to the synonymous Kumamoto 1st District, which was a single-member constituency elected through FPTP, in 1996 general election. The two constituencies are fundamentally different from each other, only with their identical name.) (1993–1996); Kumamoto 1st (1996–1998)

Member of the House of Councillors
- In office 26 July 1992 – 4 July 1993
- Preceded by: Multi-member district
- Succeeded by: Keizō Kojima
- Constituency: National PR
- In office 4 July 1971 – 11 February 1983
- Preceded by: Multi-member district
- Succeeded by: Masaru Urata
- Constituency: National district (1971–1977); Kumamoto at-large (1977–1983)

Personal details
- Born: 14 January 1938 (age 88) Tokyo, Empire of Japan
- Party: Democratic (1998–2016)
- Other political affiliations: LDP (until 1992); JNP (1992–1994); NFP (1994–1997); From Five (1997–1998); GGP (1998)
- Spouse: Kayoko Ueda (m. 1971)
- Children: 3 (including Morimitsu)
- Relatives: Tadateru Konoe (brother)
- Education: Sophia University

Morihiro Hosokawa (細川 護煕, Hosokawa Morihiro; born 14 January 1938) is a Japanese politician who served as prime minister of Japan from 1993 to 1994. He led an eight-party coalition government which was the first Japanese government not headed by a Liberal Democratic Party (LDP) premier since 1955.

Born to the Hosokawa family, which ruled present-day Kumamoto Prefecture from the 17th to the 19th centuries, Hosokawa is also a grandson of Prince Fumimaro Konoe through his mother. He graduated from Sophia University before working at the Asahi Shimbun newspaper, and was elected to the National Diet in 1971 before leaving to serve as governor of his home prefecture from 1983 to 1991.

In 1992, Hosokawa left the LDP to found the reformist Japan New Party, which won 35 seats in the 1993 general election. The LDP lost its governing majority, which was replaced by an eight-party coalition led by Hosokawa. He initiated electoral reforms before Tsutomu Hata's Japan Renewal Party took over leadership of the coalition in 1994. Hosokawa joined the New Frontier Party in 1996 and Democratic Party of Japan (DPJ) in 1998 before retiring from politics. He unsuccessfully ran for Governor of Tokyo in 2014.

Since his father's death in 2005, he has been the 18th head of the main branch of the Hosokawa clan, which held the titles of Marquis and Lord of Higo. Since retiring from politics, he has been active as a potter and tea master.

== Early life and education ==
Morihiro Hosokawa was born in Tokyo as the eldest grandson of Moritatsu, 3rd Marquess Hosokawa, and head of the Hosokawa clan. His maternal grandfather is the former prime minister Prince Fumimaro Konoe (1937–1939, 1940–1941). As a great-great-grandson of Prince Kuni Asahiko, he is a third cousin of the present emperor, Naruhito. He is also the third cousin of Emperor Naruhito through his great-great grandfather, Shimazu Tadayoshi, who was the grandfather of Empress Nagako, the wife of Hirohito. He is also a descendant of Christian heroine Gracia Hosokawa.

Hosokawa received his LL.B. degree from Sophia University in 1961.

== Political career ==
After working for the newspaper Asahi Shimbun as journalist for five years, he made an unsuccessful run in the 1969 general election. He was elected to the House of Councillors of Japan as an LDP representative of Kumamoto Prefecture in 1971, with his campaign funded by party boss Kakuei Tanaka.

After serving two terms in the National Diet, Hosokawa left in 1983 to become the governor of Kumamoto, where he served until 1991. During his term as governor, he complained about the powerful bureaucracy of the central government. Hosokawa pursued an aggressive economic policy and strengthened environmental laws. In May 1992, an ongoing campaign contribution scandal inspired him to form the reformist Japan New Party (JNP), which won four seats (one of which Hosokawa assumed) in the 1992 House of Councillors election.

== Premiership (1993–1994) ==
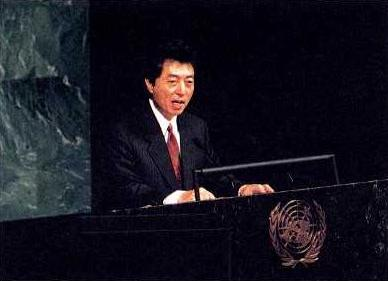
Hosokawa at the United Nations General Assembly on September 27, 1993

In the July 1993 general election, in a change very few had foreseen even a year earlier, the LDP lost its majority in the Diet for the first time in thirty-eight years, winning only 223 out of 511 seats in the House of Representatives. The previous LDP government of Kiichi Miyazawa was replaced by an eight-party coalition government which promised a series of social, political, and economic reforms. Excluding the JCP, the coalition was backed by all of the former opposition parties, which included the newly formed JNP, the Japan Socialist Party, the Japan Renewal Party (Shinseito), Komeito, the Democratic Socialist Party, the Socialist Democratic Federation, the RENGO and the New Party Sakigake, who together controlled 243 seats in the House of Representatives. Hosokawa, one of the major voices in forming the coalition, was chosen as the new Prime Minister.

Walter Mondale, then the US ambassador to Japan, characterized Hosokawa as having a "Kennedy-esque" ability to focus on ideals; nonetheless, Hosokawa's coalition had no common ideas other than their opposition to the LDP, which undermined Hosokawa throughout his term as prime minister. He was also at odds with Japan's bureaucracy, which he sought to reform after decades of bureaucratic entrenchment under the LDP.

=== Foreign policy ===
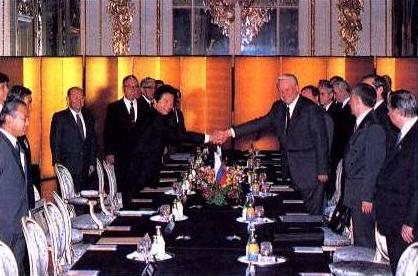
Hosokawa with Boris Yeltsin, Hirohisa Fujii and Masayoshi Takemura in October 1993

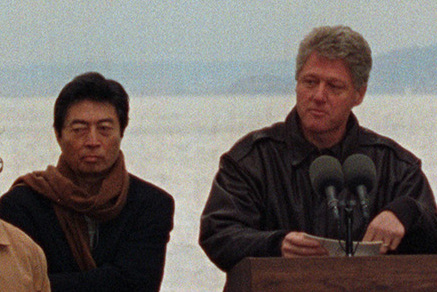
Hosokawa with Bill Clinton at APEC Summit in November 1993

Hosokawa made several unprecedented moves toward atonement with Japan's Asian neighbors during his term as prime minister. In his first news conference in office, he made an unprecedented statement acknowledging that Japan waged a war of aggression in World War II.

Hosokawa later said: "You can obviously define 'aggression' in any number of ways, depending on context. But if you have any common sense, you just cannot say in good conscience that Japan was not the aggressor when Japan did in fact cause tremendous anguish and loss of life in China, Korea and Southeast Asian nations in order to protect its own interests. I knew my opinion was going to invite heated controversy."

On 6 November 1993, he visited South Korea, where he had a summit with President Kim Young-sam in Gyeongju and again offered a clear apology to the Korean people for Japan's actions in the war, statements which were widely applauded in Korea. Hosokawa viewed the Japanese annexation of Korea as wrong and rejected the right-wing view in Japan that it was with Korea's consent and was beneficial to Korea. On 19 March 1994, he visited China, and the two governments signed an agreement of cooperation in environmental protection.

In May 1994, right-wing extremist Masakatsu Nozoe fired a gunshot into the ceiling of a Tokyo hotel where Hosokawa was giving a speech, in apparent protest at Hosokawa's statements.

Hosokawa's acts toward China and Korea inspired Russian president Boris Yeltsin to apologize to Hosokawa for the Soviet detention of Japanese prisoners of war in Siberia. Hosokawa later speculated that if both men had remained in office longer Russian-Japanese relations would have improved significantly. Hosokawa also had a good personal relationship with Bill Clinton, but trade disputes between Japan and the United States dominated US-Japan relations during Hosokawa's tenure.

=== Domestic policy ===
The Hosokawa government pushed for changes to Japanese election laws intended to fight political corruption, including elimination of corporate political donations to individual candidates and a redrawing of the electoral system, both intended to prevent the LDP from continuing to employ its past electoral practices. After an extended legislative fight, the LDP was able to force several concessions to maintain their advantage, retaining corporate political donations with a cap, while pushing back on some more radical changes to the electoral map and ensuring that most candidates would keep essentially the same seats in the next election. These compromises had a negative impact on the public approval of the Hosokawa coalition.

A law of December 1993 amending the Basic Law on measures for physically and mentally disabled persons of 1970 aimed to promote the independence of disabled people and their participation in activities in any field such as culture, the economy, and community affairs. Amendments made to regulations under the Industrial Safety and Health Law of 1972 on 30 March 1994 included accidents involving the collapsing of cranes and breaking of wires that needed to be reported to the authorities. On 1 April 1994, a 40-hour workweek was introduced.

Hosokawa also enacted cuts in income and resident taxes, intended to help Japan out of the recession that had followed the Japanese asset price bubble of the late 1980s and early 1990s. After pressure from the finance ministry, the government compensated for these cuts by announcing an increase in the consumption tax from 3% to 7%, effective from 1997. The move was controversial within the cabinet, as Ichiro Ozawa favored a 10% rate while the Japan Socialist Party would not agree to an increase. Hosokawa announced the increase but retracted the announcement the next day, leaving the tax at 3%. The government's response to the issue weakened its hold on power and was said to hasten its demise. The tax was eventually increased to 5% in 1997 by LDP Prime Minister Ryutaro Hashimoto.

=== Resignation ===
Hosokawa was forced to resign in April 1994 after it came to light that he had accepted a 100-million-yen loan from a trucking company previously accused of bribery and links to organized crime. Amid allegations of bribery, Hosokawa argued that the money was a loan and produced a receipt to show that he had paid it back; LDP members passed around a copy remarking that it looked like a fake. Although Hosokawa still had high public approval at the time, opinion was growing that he could not meet the expectations set at the start of his term.

Hosokawa's resignation was abrupt and led to a number of frenzied meetings aimed at saving the coalition, which was torn between the rival camps of Ichiro Ozawa and Masayoshi Takemura. After his resignation, the coalition was taken over by the Shinseito president Tsutomu Hata.

=== Cabinet ===
The Hosokawa Cabinet was a product of his multi-party coalition but was dominated by individuals viewed as conservatives. Its key ministers were members of the Shinseito party led by Ichiro Ozawa. Hosokawa's own Japan New Party had no other representatives in the cabinet.

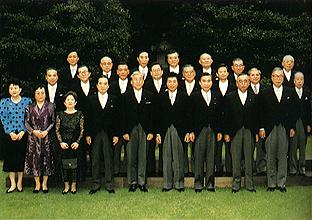
Hosokawa with the Ministers of the Hosokawa Government (at the garden of the Prime Minister's Official Residence on 9 August 1993)

Cabinet of Morihiro Hosokawa
Chief Cabinet Secretary	Masayoshi Takemura (Sakigake)
Foreign Affairs	Tsutomu Hata (Shinseito)
Justice	Akira Mikazuki (non-affiliated)
Finance	Hirohisa Fujii (Shinseito)
Education	Yoko Akamatsu (non-affiliated)
Health and Welfare	Keigo Ouchi (Democratic Socialist)
Labor	Chikara Sakaguchi (Komeito)
Agriculture, Forestry and Fisheries	Eijiro Hata (Shinseito)
International Trade and Industry	Hiroshi Kumagai (Shinseito)
Transport	Shigeru Ito (Socialist)
Construction	Kozo Igarashi (Socialist)
Home Affairs and National Public Safety Commission	Kanju Sato (Socialist)
Posts and Telecommunications	Takenori Kanzaki (Komeito)
Management and Coordination Agency	Koshiro Ishida (Komeito)
Japan Defense Agency	Hiroyoshi Nakanishi (Shinseito) until 1 December 1993; Kazuo Aichi (Shinseito) after 2 December 1993
Hokkaido and Okinawa Development, National Land Agency	Kosuke Uehara (Socialist)
Economic Planning Agency	Manae Kubota (Socialist)
Environment	Wakako Hironaka (Komeito)
Council for Science and Technology Policy	Satsuki Eda (Socialist Democratic)
Minister of State	Sadao Yamahana (Socialist)

== Later political life ==
Hosokawa joined the New Frontier Party in 1994 but, following further disputes with Ichiro Ozawa, left in 1997 with four other legislators who formed the short-lived From Five party. In 1998, From Five merged into the Good Governance Party, which itself merged into the Democratic Party of Japan (DPJ) later that year.

After the LDP returned to power in 1994, Hosokawa teamed up with Junichiro Koizumi of the LDP and Shusei Tanaka of New Party Sakigake in a strategic dialogue across party lines regarding Japan becoming a permanent member of the United Nations Security Council. Although this idea was not popular within the LDP and never came to fruition, Hosokawa and Koizumi maintained a close working relationship in subsequent years. Hosokawa tacitly served as Koizumi's personal envoy to China at times of strained Sino-Japanese relations during Koizumi's term as prime minister from 2001 to 2006.

Hosokawa retired from politics in 1998 at the age of 60. In his retirement, he took up pottery, studying intensively for 18 months under pottery master Shiro Tsujimura. Hosokawa's pottery has been exhibited in Japan and Europe. He uses his pottery for tea ceremonies at a tea house originally constructed for a visit by Jacques Chirac, which was cancelled due to the outbreak of the Iraq War. He is also a special consultant to The Japan Times. Upon his father's death in 2005, Hosokawa succeeded him as the head of the Hosokawa family.

== Tokyo gubernatorial bid ==
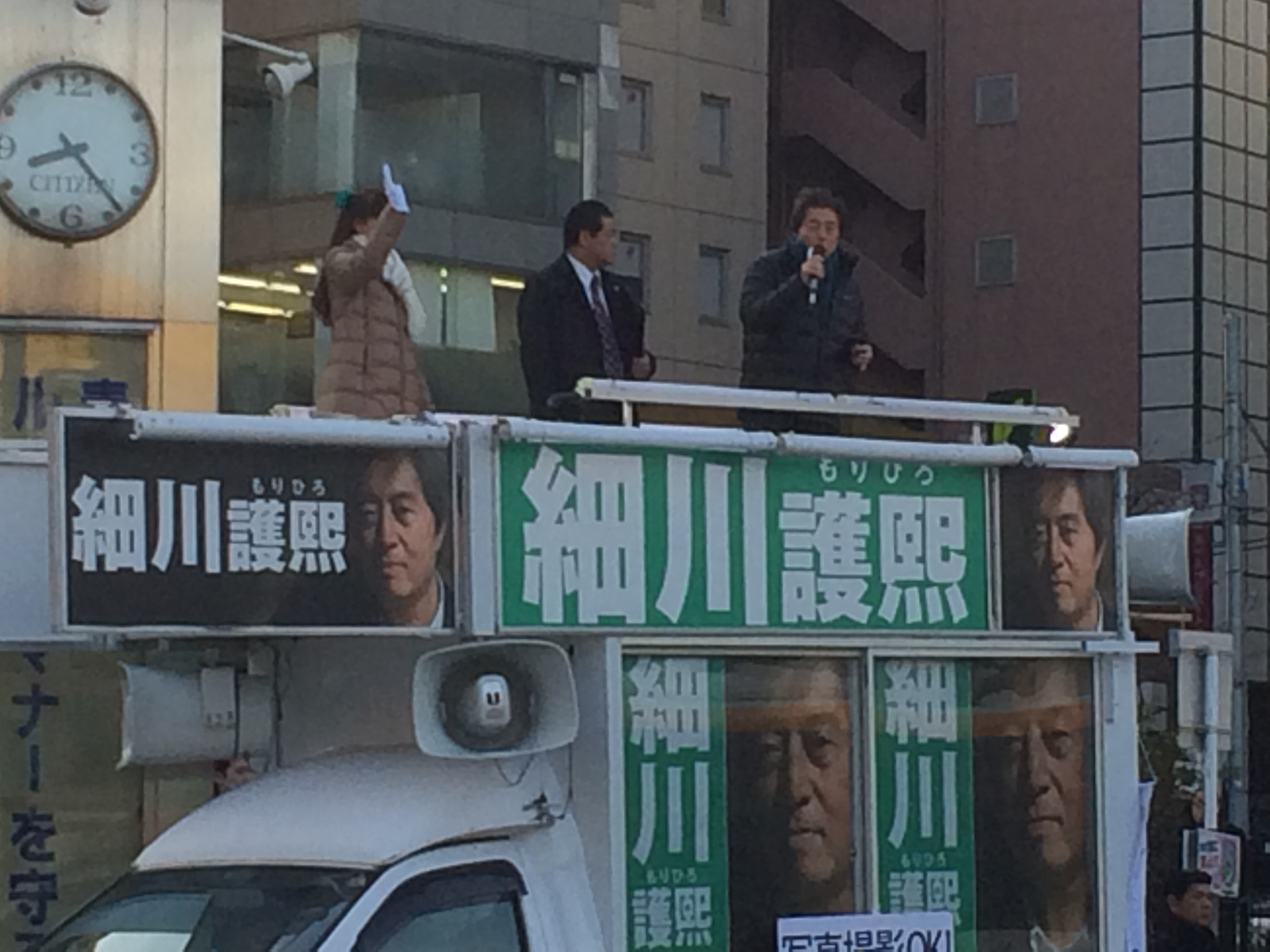
Hosokawa campaigning (at Takadanobaba Station on February 7, 2014)

In 2014, at the age of 75, Hosokawa was approached by the DPJ to run in the Tokyo gubernatorial election. Although Hosokawa initially turned down their request, former Prime Minister Junichiro Koizumi encouraged him to run for the primary purpose of gathering public opposition to Prime Minister Shinzō Abe's pro-nuclear policies, and Hosokawa again considered running for the office. This was initially perceived as a blow to Yōichi Masuzoe, the LDP-supported candidate who was also supported by elements within the DPJ and who had previously been considered the lone front-runner in the race; the race between Masuzoe and Hosokawa became widely dubbed as a "proxy contest" between Abe and Koizumi.

Hosokawa announced his candidacy alongside Koizumi on January 14. His campaign was supported by several key members of his 1993-94 coalition: Banri Kaieda and Ichirō Ozawa, who had since become the heads of the Democratic Party of Japan and People's Life Party respectively, threw their support behind Hosokawa, while Shusei Tanaka and Yoriko Madoka were enlisted as his policy advisors.

During his campaign, Hosokawa criticized the Abe government's nuclear policy, stating: "Tokyo is shoving nuclear power plants and nuclear waste to other regions, while enjoying the convenience (of electricity) as a big consumer." He also criticized Abe's foreign policy in the run-up to the 2020 Summer Olympics in Tokyo, questioning "whether pugnacious diplomacy will help the festival of peace to be held smoothly."

Hosokawa failed to gain momentum and trailed behind Masuzoe in the polls through the final week of the campaign, with only a 30–40% support rating within the DPJ and PLP and particularly low support among women. Masuzoe was declared the winner in exit polls shortly after voting ended on February 9, but Hosokawa vowed to continue anti-nuclear advocacy.

== Personal life ==
Hosokawa lives in Yugawara, Kanagawa. His wife, Kayoko Hosokawa, to whom he has been married since 23 October 1971, served as honorary chair of the Special Olympics Nippon Foundation and headed NPOs devoted to providing vaccines to children in developing nations and helping the intellectually disabled. He and Kayoko have three children: Morimitsu, Satoko and Yūko.

== Notes ==
Political offices
Preceded by Issei Sawada	Governor of Kumamoto Prefecture; 1983–1991	Succeeded by Jōji Fukushima
Preceded by Kiichi Miyazawa	Prime Minister of Japan; 1993–1994	Succeeded by Tsutomu Hata
Diplomatic posts
Preceded by Kiichi Miyazawa	Chairperson of the G7; 1993	Succeeded by Silvio Berlusconi
Academic offices
New title	Principal of Tohoku University of Art and Design; 2011–2014	Vacant
New title	Principal of Kyoto University of Art and Design; 2011–2014	Succeeded by Shōchoku Tokuyama
Cultural offices
Preceded by Morisada Hosokawa	Chief Director of the Eisei Bunko Museum; 2005–present	Incumbent
Honorary titles
Preceded by Akinori Mineyama	Youngest member of the House of Councillors of Japan; 1971–1972	Succeeded by Jūrō Saitō
