= Shiro Tsujimura =

Japanese artist (born 1947)

Shiro Tsujimura (辻村史朗, Tsujimura Shirō; born 1947 in Gossei, Japan) is a Japanese ceramic artist. New York Times commends his work with the following words: "For a look at some of the most expressive abstract painting around, check out the new ceramics by the Japanese artist Shiro Tsujimura at Koichi Yanagi. Mr. Tsujimura, who was born in 1947 and trained in a Zen temple before becoming a potter, is self-taught, prolific and wide open to all kinds of traditional styles and forms, which he makes entirely his own".

== Books ==
Shiro Tsujimura. Ceramic works. New York : Yoshii Gallery, 2009.
