= From Five =

From Five フロム・ファイブ
- President: Morihiro Hosokawa
- Founder: Morihiro Hosokawa
- Founded: December 1997
- Dissolved: January 1998
- Split from: New Frontier Party
- Merged into: Good Governance Party

From Five (フロム・ファイブ, Furomu Faibu) was a Japanese political party that existed from December 1997 to January 1998. It was formed by former Prime Minister Morihiro Hosokawa and four other legislators (Yoriko Madoka, Shinji Tarutoko, Kiyoshi Ueda and Takenori Emoto) who left the New Frontier Party in June 1997. From Five merged into the Good Governance Party in January 1998, which became part of the Democratic Party of Japan in 1998.

== Presidents of FF ==
No.	Name	Image	Term of office	
No.	Name	Image	Took office	Left office
Split from: New Frontier Party
1	Morihiro Hosokawa		26 December 1997	23 January 1998
Successor party: Good Governance Party
