= Dainiin Club =

Dainiin Club 第二院クラブ
- Founded: 1983
- Political position: Center-left

Website
- Official website

The Dainiin Club (第二院クラブ) is a political party in the Upper House of Japan.

The word "Dainiin" (第二院) means the House of Councillors (参議院 Sangiin).

The direct meaning of "Dainiin" in Japanese is "The 2nd House". In this case The 2nd House means House of Councillors in Japan. Daini means "The 2nd", in means "House" (in political terminology).
