= Sun Party =

Former political party in Japan

Sun Party 太陽党 Taiyōtō
- President: Tsutomu Hata
- Founded: 26 December 1996
- Dissolved: 23 January 1998
- Split from: New Frontier Party
- Merged into: Good Governance Party

The Sun Party (太陽党, Taiyōtō) was a short-lived political party in Japan which existed from 1996 to 1998. It was a liberal reformist party that was opposed to the ruling coalition led by the Liberal Democratic Party (Japan).

== History ==
The party was composed of thirteen Diet members who left the New Frontier Party in 1996. It was led by Tsutomu Hata, a former Prime Minister of Japan. Other notable members included Katsuya Okada, the future head of the Democratic Party of Japan. In January 1998 the Sun Party merged with other small parties to form the Good Governance Party.

== Presidents of SP ==
No.	Name	Image	Term of office	
No.	Name	Image	Took office	Left office
Split from: New Frontier Party
1	Tsutomu Hata		26 December 1996	23 January 1998
Successor party: Good Governance Party
