= Good Governance Party =

Former political party in Japan

Good Governance Party 民政党 Minseitō
- President: Tsutomu Hata
- Founded: 23 January 1998
- Dissolved: 27 April 1998
- Merger of: Sun Party; Voice of the People; From Five
- Merged into: Democratic Party of Japan
- Ideology: Liberalism
- Political position: Centre

The Good Governance Party (民政党, Minseitō) was a Japanese political party which was in existence for a short period in early 1998. It was a centrist, reformist party that merged with other parties in April 1998 to form the Democratic Party of Japan.

There was an earlier pre-war Minseitō party, the Rikken Minseitō, which existed from 1927 to 1940.

== History ==
The Good Governance Party was composed of several smaller reformist groups that had emerged during the collapse of the large coalition New Frontier Party in 1996. These groups were:

- The Sun Party (太陽党, Taiyōtō), led by Tsutomu Hata,
- The Voice of the People (国民の声, Kokumin no Koe) led by Michihiko Kano
- The group of independents known as From Five (フロムファイブ, Furomu Faibu), led by Morihiro Hosokawa.

Shortly after uniting on January 23, 1998, the Good Governance Party merged with the previous Democratic Party of Japan (1996-1998) (民主党, Minshutō), the New Fraternity Party (新党友愛, Shintō-Yūai), and the Democratic Reform Party (民主改革連合, Minshu-Kaikaku-Rengō) to form the brand-new Democratic Party of Japan. Hata, Kano and Hosokawa all played important roles in the development of the DPJ as the largest opposition party in Japan.

== Presidents of GGP ==
No.	Name	Image	Term of office	
No.	Name	Image	Took office	Left office
Preceding parties: Sun Party, Voice of the People, & From Five
1	Tsutomu Hata		23 January 1998	27 April 1998
Successor party: Democratic Party (1998)
