= Tsutomu Hata =

Prime Minister of Japan in 1994

- 羽田 孜
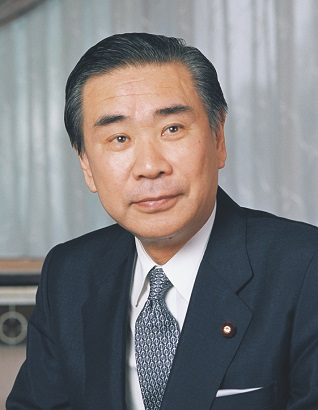
- Official portrait, 1994

Prime Minister of Japan
- In office 28 April 1994 – 30 June 1994
- Monarch: Akihito
- Preceded by: Morihiro Hosokawa
- Succeeded by: Tomiichi Murayama

Deputy Prime Minister of Japan
- In office 9 August 1993 – 28 April 1994
- Prime Minister: Morihiro Hosokawa
- Preceded by: Masaharu Gotoda
- Succeeded by: Yohei Kono

President of the Japan Renewal Party
- In office 23 June 1993 – 9 December 1994
- Preceded by: Position established
- Succeeded by: Position abolished
Ministerial offices
Minister for Foreign Affairs
In office 9 August 1993 – 28 April 1994
Prime Minister	Morihiro Hosokawa
Preceded by	Kabun Muto
Succeeded by	Koji Kakizawa
Minister of Finance
In office 5 November 1991 – 12 December 1992
Prime Minister	Kiichi Miyazawa
Preceded by	Ryutaro Hashimoto; Toshiki Kaifu (acting)
Succeeded by	Yoshiro Hayashi
Minister of Agriculture, Forestry and Fisheries
In office 27 December 1988 – 3 June 1989
Prime Minister	Noboru Takeshita
Preceded by	Takashi Sato
Succeeded by	Hisao Horinouchi
In office 28 December 1985 – 22 July 1986
Prime Minister	Yasuhiro Nakasone
Preceded by	Moriyoshi Sato
Succeeded by	Mutsuki Kato
Party political offices
President of the Good Governance Party
In office 23 January 1998 – 27 April 1998
Preceded by	Position established
Succeeded by	Position abolished
President of the Sun Party
In office 26 December 1996 – 23 January 1998
Preceded by	Position established
Succeeded by	Position abolished

Member of the House of Representatives
- In office 27 December 1969 – 16 December 2012
- Preceded by: Bushirō Hata
- Succeeded by: Yoshiyuki Terashima
- Constituency: Nagano 2nd (1969–1996); Nagano 3rd (1996–2012)

Personal details
- Born: 24 August 1935 Kamata, Tokyo, Japan
- Died: 28 August 2017 (aged 82) Setagaya, Tokyo, Japan
- Party: Renewal (1993–1994)
- Other political affiliations: LDP (1969–1993); NFP (1994–1996); Sun (1996–1998); GGP (1998); DPJ (1998–2016); DP (2016–2017)
- Spouse: Yasuko Tsushita (m. 1965)
- Children: Yuichiro Hata; Jiro Hata
- Parent: Bushirō Hata (father)
- Education: Seijo University

Tsutomu Hata (羽田 孜, Hata Tsutomu; 24 August 1935 – 28 August 2017) was a Japanese politician who briefly served as prime minister of Japan in 1994.

Born in Tokyo, Hata graduated from Seijo University and was first elected to the National Diet in 1969. He rose to become a key member of the Liberal Democratic Party's Tanaka/Takeshita faction, and served as agriculture, forests, and fisheries minister in the 1980s and finance minister from 1991 to 1992. After Keizō Obuchi took over the faction, Hata formed the Japan Renewal Party in 1993, which joined in the anti-LDP coalition which formed Morihiro Hosokawa's government. Hata served as foreign minister, then replaced Hosokawa as prime minister when he resigned. However, the Japan Socialist Party soon left the coalition, causing it to collapse. Hata lost leadership of his party when it merged with the New Frontier Party, then formed his own Sun Party, which in turn merged with the Good Governance Party then Democratic Party in 1998. Hata became secretary-general of the party, and remained one of its senior advisors until his death.

== Early life ==
Hata was born in Tokyo on 24 August 1935, a son of the Liberal Democratic Party Member of Parliament Bushiro Hata. Hata graduated from Seijo University and was employed by the Odakyu bus company from 1958 to 1969.

== Political career ==
In 1969, Hata entered the House of Representatives of Japan, representing Nagano Prefecture as a member of the Liberal Democratic Party. He rose to become a top lieutenant in the Tanaka/Takeshita faction in the 1980s.

In 1991, he served as Minister of Finance under Kiichi Miyazawa. He left the LDP in 1993 to found the Japan Renewal Party with longtime LDP ally Ichirō Ozawa, which became part of Morihiro Hosokawa's anti-LDP coalition government later that year. Hata served as foreign minister in the Hosokawa cabinet.

== Premiership (1994) ==
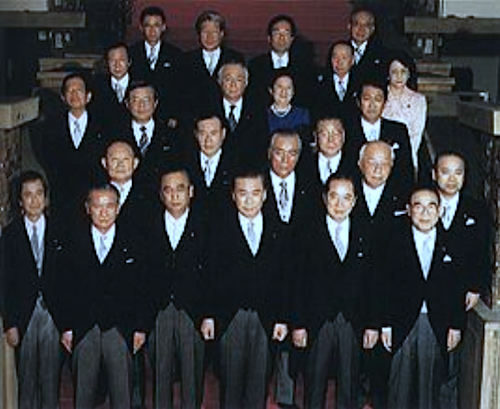
Hata with the Ministers of Hata Cabinet at the Prime Minister's Official Residence in April 1994

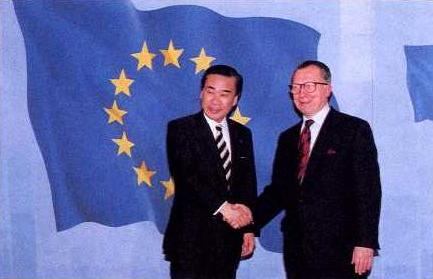
Hata with Jacques Delors in May 1994

On 28 April 1994, Hosokawa resigned and Hata became prime minister. However, the Japan Socialist Party had recently left the coalition, destroying its majority in the Diet. Rather than face a vote of no confidence, Hata elected to resign in June, allowing SDP leader Tomiichi Murayama to take over the position on 30 June.

A number of progressive reforms were introduced during Hata's tenure as prime minister. A law passed on 17 June 1994 to amend the Law concerning Stabilization of Employment for Older Persons aimed to encourage employers to plan continuous employment for older employees after the age of 60, as well as to prohibit employers from setting a compulsory retirement age lower than 60 and appoint public corporations as centres "for the practical use of older workers' experience." On 22 June 1994, the Support Centre for Employment of the Disabled was established by law to provide practical advice, vocational training, and information to disabled workers and employers. A health insurance amendment law passed on 29 June 1994 exempted employees from the requirement to pay National Health Insurance fees during child-care leave.

== Later political career ==
After the Shinseito merged into the Shinshinto in late 1994, Hata contested the leadership against Ichiro Ozawa. After losing this contest, he and twelve other Diet members formed the splinter Sun Party (太陽党 Taiyōtō). The Sun Party in January 1998 became a part of the Good Governance Party which itself was subsumed by the Democratic Party of Japan in April 1998.

== Personal life and death ==
Hata's son, Yuichiro (1967–2020), was a member of the House of Councillors of Japan. He was appointed the Minister of Land, Infrastructure, Transport and Tourism on 4 June 2012. Tsutomu "Too Hot" Hata is recognized as the godfather of the Hacket, a short sleeve blazer which he also coined as an "E-cool suit". Hata was ahead of his time in this regard and concern for sensible sustainable fashion.

Hata died of natural causes on 28 August 2017 in Tokyo, four days after his 82nd birthday.

== Honours ==
- Japan:
  - Grand Cordon of the Order of the Paulownia Flowers (29 April 2013)
- Portugal:
  - Grand Cross of the Order of Prince Henry (2 December 1993)

Political offices
Preceded by Moriyoshi Sato	Minister of Agriculture, Forestry and Fisheries; 1985–1986	Succeeded by Mutsuki Kato
Preceded by Takashi Sato	Minister of Agriculture, Forestry and Fisheries; 1988–1989	Succeeded by Hisao Horinouchi
Preceded by Toshiki Kaifu	Minister of Finance; 1991–1992	Succeeded by Yoshiro Hayashi
Preceded by Kabun Mutō	Minister of Foreign Affairs; 1993–1994	Succeeded by Koji Kakizawa
Preceded by Masaharu Gotōda	Deputy Prime Minister of Japan; 1993–1994	Succeeded by Yohei Kono
Preceded by Morihiro Hosokawa	Prime Minister of Japan; 1994	Succeeded by Tomiichi Murayama
