= Japan New Party =

Japan New Party 日本新党 Nihon Shintō
- Founder: Morihiro Hosokawa
- Founded: 22 May 1992
- Dissolved: 9 December 1994
- Merged into: New Frontier Party
- Ideology: Liberalism; Liberal conservatism; Fiscal conservatism; Neoliberalism; Neoconservatism
- Political position: Centre to centre-right
- Colors: Medium green (official); Blue-green (customary)

The Japan New Party (日本新党, Nihon Shintō) was a Japanese political party that existed briefly from 1992 to 1994.

The party, considered liberal and liberal-conservative, was founded by Morihiro Hosokawa, a former Diet member and Kumamoto Prefecture governor, who left the Liberal Democratic Party to protest corruption scandals. In 1992, the party elected four members to the House of Councillors, including Hosokawa. Although this was a disappointing result for them, in 1993 they were able to capitalize on voter dissatisfaction with the LDP, electing a total of 35 members (including 3 who joined after the election). Hosokawa became Prime Minister leading a broad coalition, but was soon forced to resign.

The party defended the political reformism, consumers rights and supported decentralization.

By 1994, the Japan New Party dissolved, its members flowing into the New Frontier Party (新進党).

Several Diet members who've become prominent in other parties were first elected for the Japan New Party, including Yoshihiko Noda, Seiji Maehara, Yukio Edano, Toshimitsu Motegi, Yuriko Koike and Takashi Kawamura.

== List of leaders of JNP ==
No.	Name (Birth–death)	Portrait	Constituency / title	Term of office		Prime Minister (term)
No.	Name (Birth–death)	Portrait	Constituency / title	Took office	Left office	Prime Minister (term)
Split from: Liberal Democratic Party
1	Morihiro Hosokawa (b. 1938)		Rep for Kumamoto 1st	22 May 1992	9 December 1994	Miyazawa 1991–93
1	Morihiro Hosokawa (b. 1938)		Rep for Kumamoto 1st	22 May 1992	9 December 1994	himself 1993–94
1	Morihiro Hosokawa (b. 1938)		Rep for Kumamoto 1st	22 May 1992	9 December 1994	Hata 1994
1	Morihiro Hosokawa (b. 1938)		Rep for Kumamoto 1st	22 May 1992	9 December 1994	Murayama 1994–96
Successor party: New Frontier Party

== Election results ==
=== House of Representatives ===
Election	Leader	Votes	%	Seats	Position	Status
1993	Morihiro Hosokawa	5,053,981	8.05	35 / 511	5th	Governing coalition

=== House of Councillors ===
Election	Leader	Constituency			Party list			Seats	Position	Status
Election	Leader	Votes	%	Seats	Votes	%	Seats	Seats	Position	Status
1992	Morihiro Hosokawa	—N/a			3,617,247	7.97	4 / 126	4 / 252	4th	Opposition

== See also ==
- Liberalism in Japan
- Conservative mainstream (in Japanese)
