= New Frontier Party (Japan) =

Defunct political party in Japan

New Frontier Party 新進党 Shinshintō
- Founders: Toshiki Kaifu; Ichirō Ozawa
- Founded: 10 December 1994
- Dissolved: 31 December 1997
- Merger of: Japan Renewal Party; Kōmeitō; Democratic Socialist Party; Japan New Party; Liberals
- Succeeded by: New Fraternity Party; Liberal Party
- Headquarters: Tokyo
- Ideology: Neoconservatism; Neoliberalism
- Political position: Big tent
- Colors: Red (official); Pink (customary)

The New Frontier Party (新進党, Shinshintō; "New Progressive Party", NFP) was a big tent political party in Japan founded in December 1994. As a merger of several small parties, the party was ideologically diverse, with its membership ranging from moderate social democrats to liberals and conservatives. The party dissolved in December 1997, with Ichirō Ozawa's faction forming the Liberal Party and other splinters later joining the Democratic Party of Japan in April 1998.

== History ==
=== Foundation ===
The party was founded on 10 December 1994 by former member parties of the anti-Liberal Democratic Party (LDP) opposition coalition led by Morihiro Hosokawa who had resigned in April. During the formation of the succeeding Hata cabinet, several coalition parties formed a joint parliamentary group. But at the same time, the Japan Socialist Party (JSP) and the New Party Sakigake withdrew from the eight-party coalition and left Hata without majority. In June, the LDP returned to power by striking a "grand" coalition deal with the JSP under which the Socialists would receive the prime ministership. Hata resigned before an impending no-confidence vote submitted by the LDP: In less than a year, the anti-LDP coalition had broken down. After the electoral reform initiated by the anti-LDP coalition had been passed by the new LDP-JSP coalition in November 1994, the opposition parties negotiated on creating a unified force to contest the newly introduced First-past-the-post voting single-member electoral districts that now elect the majority of the House of Representatives: In December, the Japan Renewal Party, a part of Kōmeitō which had split a few days before, the Democratic Socialist Party (DSP), the Japan New Party and the Jiyū Kaikaku Rengō ("Liberal Reform League," a federation of several small groups of Diet members who had broken away from the LDP) formed the New Frontier Party, becoming the largest single party formed in post-war Japan other than the LDP.

=== Internal conflicts ===
On 8 December 1994, the Diet members of the future party elected former LDP Prime Minister Toshiki Kaifu as leader, Kaifu received 131 votes, former Prime Minister Tsutomu Hata 52 and DSP leader Takashi Yonezawa 32 votes. In 1995, Kaifu was succeeded by Ichirō Ozawa who led the party from 1995 until its dissolution in 1997. Ozawa won the leadership election among party members and registered supporters (tōyū) in December 1995 with 1,120,012 votes against Tsutomu Hata who received 566,998 votes. Ozawa was reelected just a few days before the party dissolved in a vote among NFP Diet members and delegates from NFP prefectural federations in December 1997, defeating Michihiko Kano by 230 votes to 182.

The party held onto 156 seats in the 1996 general election, losing a net four seats and failing to attack the LDP-SDP government majority, but remaining the largest opposition party. Unlike the other major, nationwide parties (mainly LDP and DPJ), the SDP was already in the advanced stages of its decline to a micro-party. In 1996, Ozawa's NFP made little use of the possibility to nominate dual candidates that stand in both the majoritarian and the proportional election at the same time under the new parallel electoral system. Thereby, the party lost a string of experienced politicians who were not "insured" by a dual candidacy on a proportional list. In total, more than 40 NFP incumbents who sought reelection lost their seats in 1996.

=== Dissolution and aftermath ===
After the New Frontier Party dissolved in 1997, its remnants collated into several small parties:

- The New Peace Party (Shintō Heiwa) and the "Dawn Club" (Reimei Club) of former Kōmeitō members, these merged later in 1998 with the still existing Kōmei to re-establish the ("New") Kōmeitō,
- the Liberal Party of Ichirō Ozawa which later participated in a coalition with the LDP under Keizō Obuchi, but eventually merged into the Democratic Party in 2003,
- the Reform Club (Kaikaku Club) of Tatsuo Ozawa that later joined the LDP-Liberal Party-Kōmeitō coalition,
- the New Fraternity Party (Shintō Yūai) of Kansei Nakano and
- the "Voice of the People" (Kokumin no Koe) of Michihiko Kano.

The latter two parties immediately joined the Democratic Party in one parliamentary group (then renamed 民主友愛太陽国民連合, Minshu Yūai Taiyō Kokumin Rengō, "Democratic Fraternity Sun People's League", abbreviated as 民友連, Min'yūren). They were joined by two parties who had broken away from the NFP earlier – the Sun Party of Tsutomu Hata in 1996 and the From Five of Morihiro Hosokawa in 1997 – and another party from the former anti-LDP coalition that hadn't joined the NFP: the Minshu Kaikaku Rengō ("Democratic Reform League"). The joint parliamentary group gave the DPJ the role of leading the opposition in the Diet. Three member parties together formed the Minseitō ("Democratic" or "Good Governance Party") a few weeks later. All member parties of the parliamentary group eventually merged with the Democratic Party to form the ("New") Democratic Party of Japan in April 1998.

== Ideology ==
In terms of policy, the New Frontier Party took a hawkish position on foreign, security policy and related constitutional matters (which had been the main dividing line between political left and right in the 1955 System) similar to the LDP, but pushed for more deregulation, decentralization and political reform. It thereby tried to attract disgruntled LDP voters who would seek for new answers to the political challenges posed in the wake of the burst bubble economy and by the dawning demographic transition. In contrast, the Democratic Party of Japan that was formed two years later to provide an alternative to the old LDP and the Ozawa-dominated NFP, took a similar stance to the NFP on economic reform, but a more dovish position on foreign policy, thereby also becoming appealing to traditional JSP voters.

== Presidents of the NFP ==
No.	Name	Image	Term of office		Election results
No.	Name	Image	Took office	Left office	Election results
Preceding parties: Renewal Party, New Kōmei Party, Democratic Socialist Party, New Party, & Jiyū Kaikaku Rengō
1	Toshiki Kaifu		8 December 1994	28 December 1995	1994 Toshiki Kaifu – 131; Tsutomu Hata – 52; Takashi Yonezawa – 31
2	Ichirō Ozawa		28 December 1995	31 December 1997	1995 Ichiro Ozawa – 1,120,012; Tsutomu Hata – 566,998 1997 Ichiro Ozawa – 230; Michihiko Kano – 182
Successor parties: New Fraternity Party, Voice of the People, New Peace Party, Reimei Club, Liberal Party (1998), & Reform Club

== Election results ==
=== House of Representatives ===
Election	Leader	Constituency			Party list			Seats	Position	Status
Election	Leader	Votes	%	Seats	Votes	%	Seats	Seats	Position	Status
1996	Ichirō Ozawa	15,812,326	27.97	96 / 300	15,580,053	28.04	60 / 200	156 / 500	2nd	Opposition

=== House of Councillors ===
Election	Leader	Constituency			Party list			Seats		Position	Status
Election	Leader	Votes	%	Seats	Votes	%	Seats	Election	Total	Position	Status
1995	Toshiki Kaifu	11,003,681	26.47	22 / 76	12,506,322	30.75	18 / 50	46 / 126	56 / 252	1st	Opposition

== See also ==
- Contributions to liberal theory
- Democratic Party of Japan
- Liberal democracy
- Liberal Party (1998)
- Liberalism
- Liberalism in Japan
- Liberalism worldwide
- List of liberal parties
- Politics of Japan
