= December 2002 Democratic Party of Japan leadership election =

Political party election in Japan

- 10 December 2002
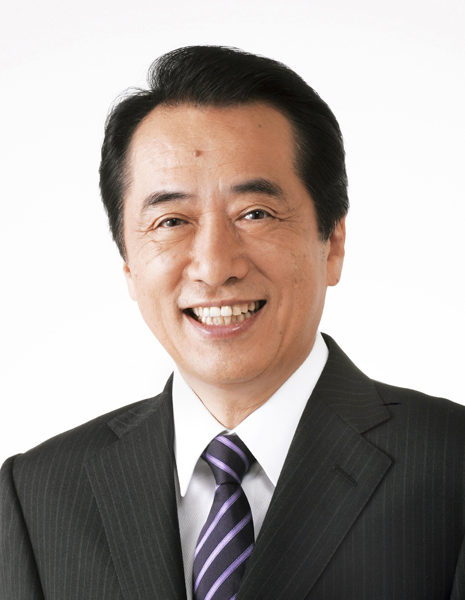

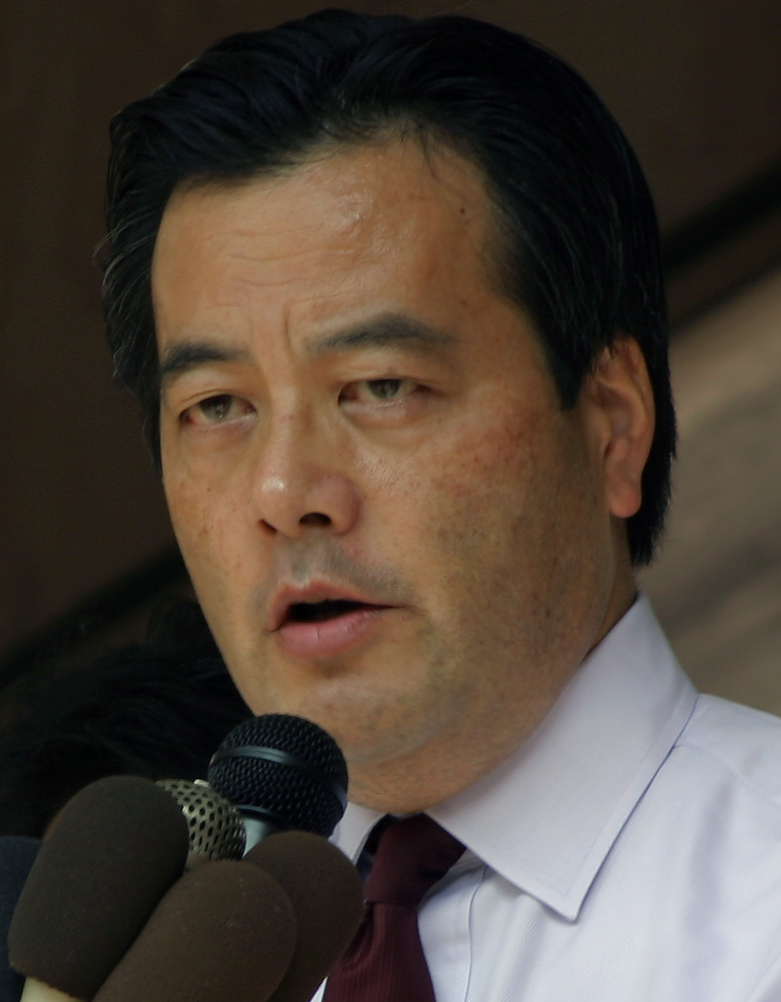
Candidate	Naoto Kan	Katsuya Okada
Leader's seat	Tokyo 18th	Mie 3rd
Caucus vote	104	79
Percentage	56.8%	43.2%
President before election
Yukio Hatoyama
Elected President
Naoto Kan

The December 2002 Democratic Party of Japan leadership election was held on 10 December 2002. The election was held to replace outgoing president Yukio Hatoyama, who resigned following the party's losses in the October national by-elections. Former president Naoto Kan defeated Katsuya Okada by an unexpectedly wide margin.

== Background ==
Yukio Hatoyama was narrowly re-elected to a third term as president less than three months earlier in September, but immediately faced difficulties. His appointment of Kansei Nakano as party secretary-general was widely criticised as a reward for his support in the election, widening party divisions. Hatoyama was further damaged when Yoshihiko Noda, candidate of junior reformers in the contest, rejected the post of party policy chief. Just a week after the election, Seiji Maehara and Shigefumi Matsuzawa stated that they would hold the president responsible if the party failed to perform in the October by-elections.

In the by-elections on 27 October, the DPJ won just one of the seven contests. In late November, Hatoyama proposed forming a joint parliamentary group between the DPJ, the Liberal Party, and SDP, which was criticised as hasty, unrealistic, and announced without party consultation. By this time, he was under intense pressure to resign.

Hatoyama announced his resignation on 3 December.

== Electoral system ==
Candidates were required to gather endorsements from twenty (maximum 25) of the party's members of the National Diet in order to stand. Each Diet member was eligible to vote (183 total). If no candidate won more than 50% of votes, a runoff was to be held the same day. Nominations were taken on the 10th and the election held the same day.

== Candidates ==
Okada was considered the candidate of generational renewal and attracted support from junior party members. Kan was considered a safer choice as a proven leader with wide name recognition.

Candidate	Offices held
Naoto Kan (age 56); Tokyo	Member of the House of Representatives (1980–); President of the Democratic Party of Japan (1996–99); Minister of Health and Welfare (1996)
Katsuya Okada (age 49); Mie Prefecture	Member of the House of Representatives (1990–)

=== Sponsors ===
Naoto Kan (21)	Katsuya Okada (20)
House of Representatives: Satoshi Arai; Yukio Edano; Hideo Hiraoka; Ritsuo Hosokawa; Satoru Ienishi; Motohisa Ikeda; Eiko Ishige; Banri Kaieda; Koichi Kato; Yukichi Maeda; Hiroko Mizushima; Akira Nagatsuma; Nobuhiko Suto; Nobutaka Tsutsui; Ikuo Yamahana; Kazunori Yamanoi; Osamu Yamauchi; House of Councillors: Masamitsu Naito; Tomiko Okazaki; Mitsuru Sakurai; Marutei Tsurunen	House of Representatives: Motohisa Furukawa; Kōichirō Genba; Hirofumi Hirano; Fumihiko Igarashi; Koriki Jojima; Sayuri Kamata; Hiroshi Kawauchi; Atsushi Kinoshita; Toshiaki Koizumi; Ban Kugimiya; Yoshio Maki; Yoshikatsu Nakayama; Ken Okuda; Koichi Takemasa; Yoshio Tezuka; Shu Watanabe; House of Councillors: Keiichiro Asao; Kenji Hirata; Yoko Komiyama; Susumu Yanase

== Results ==
Candidate	Votes	%
Naoto Kan	104	56.8
Katsuya Okada	79	43.2
Total	183	100.0
Invalid	0	
Turnout	183	100.0
Eligible	183	
Source: DPJ Archive
