= September 2012 Democratic Party of Japan leadership election =

Political party election in Japan

- 21 September 2012
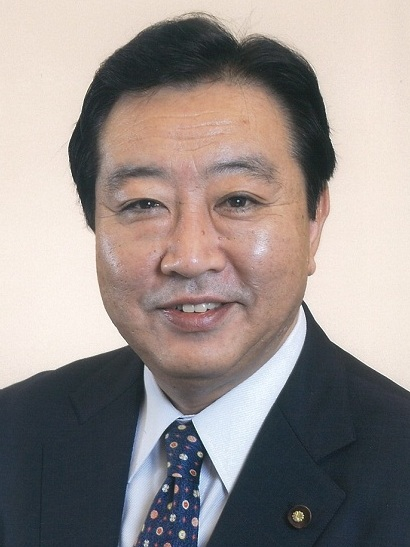

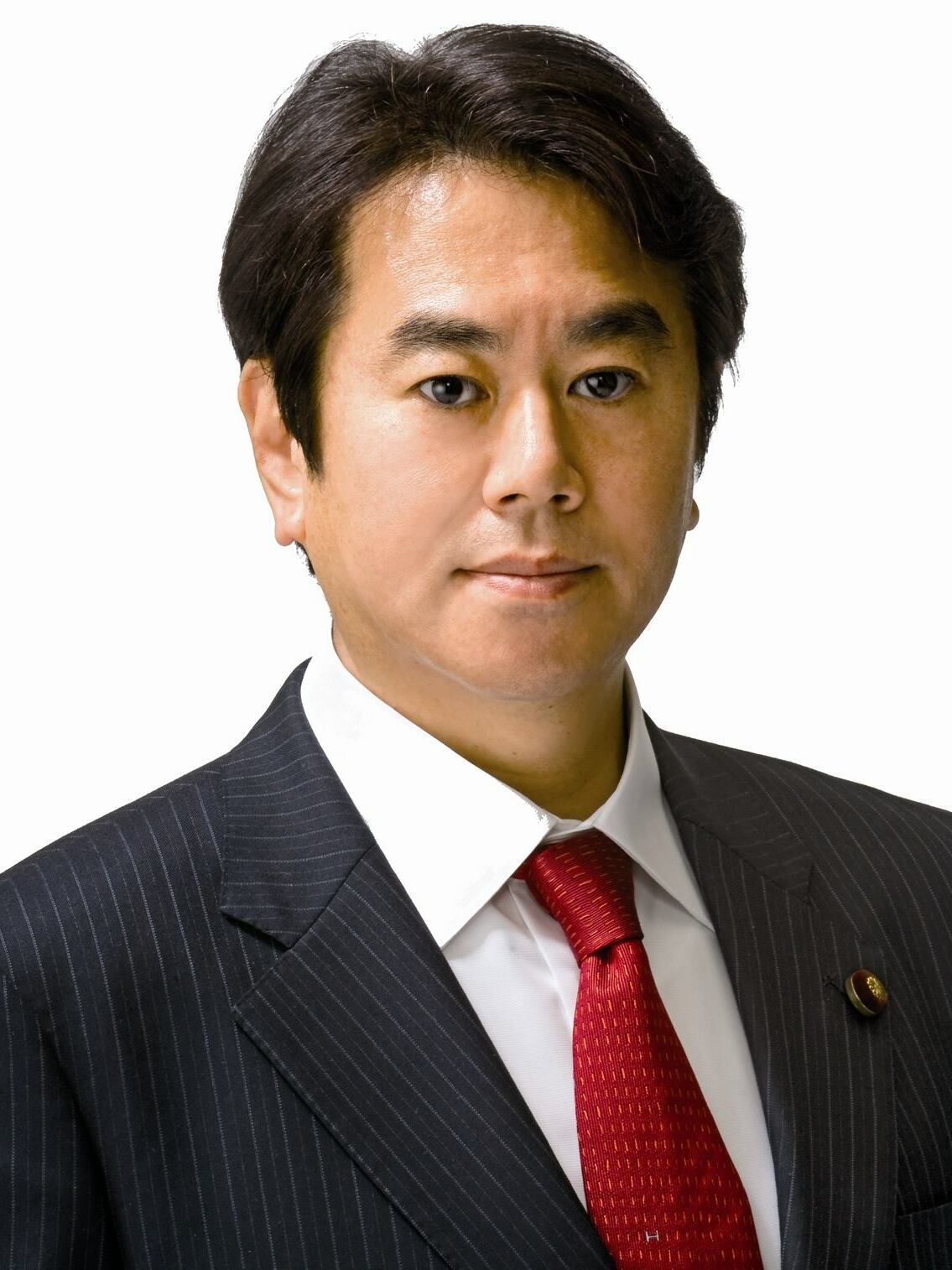

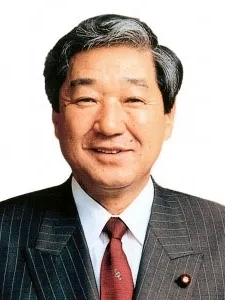

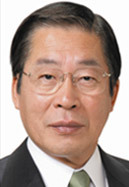
Candidate	Yoshihiko Noda	Kazuhiro Haraguchi
Leader's seat	Chiba 4th	Saga 1st
Total points	818 (67.7%)	154 (12.7%)
Candidate	Hirotaka Akamatsu	Michihiko Kano
Leader's seat	Aichi 5th	Yamagata 1st
Total points	123 (10.2%)	113 (9.4%)
- Map of the results of the party member vote.
President before election
Yoshihiko Noda
Elected President
Yoshihiko Noda

The September 2012 Democratic Party of Japan leadership election was held on 21 September 2012. The election in accordance with the end of the presidential term which had commenced in 2010. Incumbent president and Prime Minister Yoshihiko Noda was comfortably re-elected, defeating three opponents.

== Background ==
Noda became prime minister in August 2011. Among his flagship policies was a plan to raise the consumption tax from 5% to 10%, which was fiercely opposed by a group of party members led by Ichirō Ozawa and Yukio Hatoyama, who threatened to split the party over the issue. A week after the passage of the bill through the lower house in late June, Ozawa and 49 other DPJ Diet members resigned from the party. A month later, on 10 August, Noda secured agreement from the opposition Liberal Democratic Party and Komeito for the bill's passage through the upper house. Ozawa and other minor parties called a motion of no confidence against Noda in the lower house the same day, which was defeated 246–86, with the LDP and Komeito abstaining. Facing a continuing string of defections, pressure to call an election, and with an approval rating under 30%, Noda faced re-election the following month.

== Electoral system ==
Candidates were required to gather endorsements from twenty (maximum 25) of the party's members of the National Diet in order to stand.

The election was conducted via a points system:

- Each of the party's members of the National Diet had a vote worth two points. (650 points total)
- Registered party members or supporters could vote via mail. Points for this tier were distributed between the 47 prefectures, and awarded to candidates in proportion to votes won in each prefecture. (409 points total)
- Each of the party's members of local councils or prefectural assemblies could vote via mail. Points for this tier were awarded to candidates in proportion to votes won. (141 points total)
- Each of the party's approved candidates for future Diet elections had a vote worth one point. (8 points total)

In order to win, a candidate must secure more than 50% of points. If no candidate won more than 50%, a runoff was to be held the same day. In the runoff, only Diet members and approved candidates could vote. Nominations were taken on 10 September and the election held on the 21st.

== Candidates ==
Candidate	Offices held
Yoshihiko Noda (age 55); Chiba Prefecture	Member of the House of Representatives (1993–96; 2000–); President of the Democratic Party of Japan (2011–); Prime Minister of Japan (2011–)
Kazuhiro Haraguchi (age 53); Saga Prefecture	Member of the House of Representatives (1996–); Minister for Internal Affairs and Communications (2009–10)
Hirotaka Akamatsu (age 64); Aichi Prefecture	Member of the House of Representatives (1990–); Minister of Agriculture, Forestry and Fisheries (2009–10)
Michihiko Kano (age 70); Yamagata Prefecture	Member of the House of Representatives (1976–2005; 2009–); Minister of Agriculture, Forestry and Fisheries (1989–93; 2010–12)

=== Sponsors ===
Yoshihiko Noda (25)	Kazuhiro Haraguchi (20)	Hirotaka Akamatsu (20)	Michihiko Kano (21)
House of Representatives: Takako Ebata; Shuji Inatomi; Katsuyuki Ishida; Yosuke Kamiyama; Koichiro Katsumata; Kazuko Kōri; Seishu Makino; Taizō Mikazuki; Tetsuo Morimoto; Kentaro Motomura; Koichi Mukoyama; Ryuzo Sasaki; Issei Tajima; Keishu Tanaka; Gōsei Yamamoto; House of Councillors: Satsuki Eda; Tetsuro Fukuyama; Ken Kagaya; Naoki Kazama; Toshimi Kitazawa; Kiyoshige Maekawa; Hiroe Makiyama; Shunichi Mizuoka; Masayuki Naoshima; Kan Suzuki	House of Representatives: Akio Fukuda; Ben Hashimoto; Yasuhiro Kajiwara; Hiroshi Kawauchi; Tsuji Megumu; Muneaki Murai; Osamu Nakagawa; Hiroko Nakano; Kuniyoshi Noda; Sakihito Ozawa; Naoto Sakaguchi; Seiki Soramoto; Kazumi Sugimoto; Hidenori Tachibana; Nobutaka Tsutsui; Kazuyuki Yamaguchi; Tatsumaru Yamaoka; House of Councillors: Minoru Kawasaki; Motoyuki Odachi; Kaoru Tashiro	House of Representatives: Akihiro Hatsushika; Banri Kaieda; Shoichi Kondo; Isao Kuwabara; Inao Minayoshi; Takahiro Sasaki; Nobuhiko Suto; Yoshitada Tomioka; Ikuo Yamahana; Tsunehiko Yoshida; Masashige Yoshikawa; House of Councillors: Takashi Esaki; Michihiro Ishibashi; Mieko Kamimoto; Masako Ōkawara; Azuma Konno; Masayoshi Nataniya; Yoshitaka Saitō; Norio Takeuchi; Marutei Tsurunen	House of Representatives: Satoshi Arai; Kiyohito Hashimoto; Toshikazu Higuchi; Hideo Hiraoka; Motohisa Ikeda; Hidesaburo Kawamura; Issei Koga; Nobuhiro Koyama; Yoshikatsu Nakayama; Akihiro Ohata; Hiroko Oizumi; Takashi Shinohara; Onishi Takanori; Masayo Tanabu; Yukio Ubukata; Miki Wajima; Koichi Yoshida; House of Councillors: Takeshi Maeda; Teruhiko Mashiko; Toshio Ogawa; Kusuo Oshima

=== Withdrew ===
- Sumio Mabuchi, member of the House of Representatives (2003–) and Minister of Land, Infrastructure, Transport and Tourism (2010–11)
- Mitsuru Sakurai, member of the House of Councillors (1998–)
- Masahiko Yamada, member of the House of Representatives (1993–96; 2000–) and Minister of Agriculture, Forestry and Fisheries (2010)

=== Declined ===
- Goshi Hosono, member of the House of Representatives (2000–) and Minister of the Environment (2011–)
- Seiji Maehara, member of the House of Representatives (1993–) and Minister for Foreign Affairs (2010–11) – (endorsed Noda)
- Katsuya Okada, member of the House of Representatives (1990–) and Deputy Prime Minister (2012–) – (endorsed Noda)
- Makiko Tanaka, member of the House of Representatives (1993–2002; 2003–) and chair of the Diet Foreign Affairs Committee (2011–) – (endorsed Noda)

== Contest ==
Following Ozawa's secession, senior party leaders sought to reinforce Noda's leadership to avoid further damage. Secretary-general Azuma Koshiishi, policy chief Seiji Maehara, foreign minister Kōichirō Genba, and deputy Prime Minister Katsuya Okada all called for his re-election. In terms of factional support, he was supported by his own, the Kan, Maehara, Tarutoko, and ex-DSP factions. Commentators judged that, between Maehara's support and the departure of many of the "anti-mainstream" members with Ozawa, Noda's re-election was close to assured.

The scattered anti-Noda groups struggled to find a viable candidate. In early September, there was a strong movement to draft environment minister Goshi Hosono to challenge Noda. At 41 and with little cabinet experience, he was considered a fresh face who some believed stood a better chance of winning a general election than Noda. Key supporters included Junya Ogawa from the Maehara faction, Takeshi Shina formerly from the Ozawa faction, Keisuke Tsumura from the Kan faction, and Shinji Tarutoko from the Kano faction. He initially denied any interest in standing, but as nominations approached he said on the 5th would have to "seriously consider it". He met with Noda on the 7th and informed him that he would not run after all.

With no unified anti-Noda candidate, three leaders of "anti-mainstream" factions ran independently. Michihiko Kano was supported by his own faction, Hirotaka Akamatsu by former JSP members, and Kazuhiro Haraguchi by remnants of the Ozawa faction.

A Sankei Shimbun and Fuji News Network theoretical poll at the start of September found Maehara was the most popular candidate among the public with 18% support. Prime Minister Noda was a close second with 16.1%. Katsuya Okada polled 13.4% and Hosono 3%. Among DPJ supporters, Noda placed first with 31.1%.

Sumio Mabuchi, last-place finisher in the 2011 contest, intended to run but withdrew on 8 September citing the need to unify anti-Noda forces. Mitsuru Sakurai announced on the same day that he was withdrawing due to inability to gather the twenty nominations required to stand. A group of about ten Diet members launched a campaign to support Makiko Tanaka under the name "Group to Produce a Female Prime Minister", but she stated she would not run and endorsed Noda.

== Results ==
Candidate	Diet members			Party members & supporters			Local assembly members			Diet candidates			Total
Candidate	Votes	%	Points	Votes	%	Points	Votes	%	Points	Votes	%	Points	Total
Yoshihiko Noda	211	64.9	422	70,265	65.6	296	1,026	65.8	93	7	87.5	7	818
Kazuhiro Haraguchi	31	9.5	62	20,693	19.3	72	222	14.2	20	0	0.0	0	154
Hirotaka Akamatsu	40	12.3	80	9,141	8.5	24	199	12.8	18	1	12.5	1	123
Michihiko Kano	43	13.2	86	6,976	6.5	17	113	7.2	10	0	0.0	0	113
Total	326	100.0	650	107,075	100.0	409	1,560	100.0	141	8	100.0	8	1,208
Invalid	6			3,175			19			1			
Turnout	331	98.5		110,250	33.7		1,579	77.8		9	100.0		
Eligible	336			326,974			2,030			9			
Source: DPJ Archive
