= September 2002 Democratic Party of Japan leadership election =

Political party election in Japan

- 23 September 2002
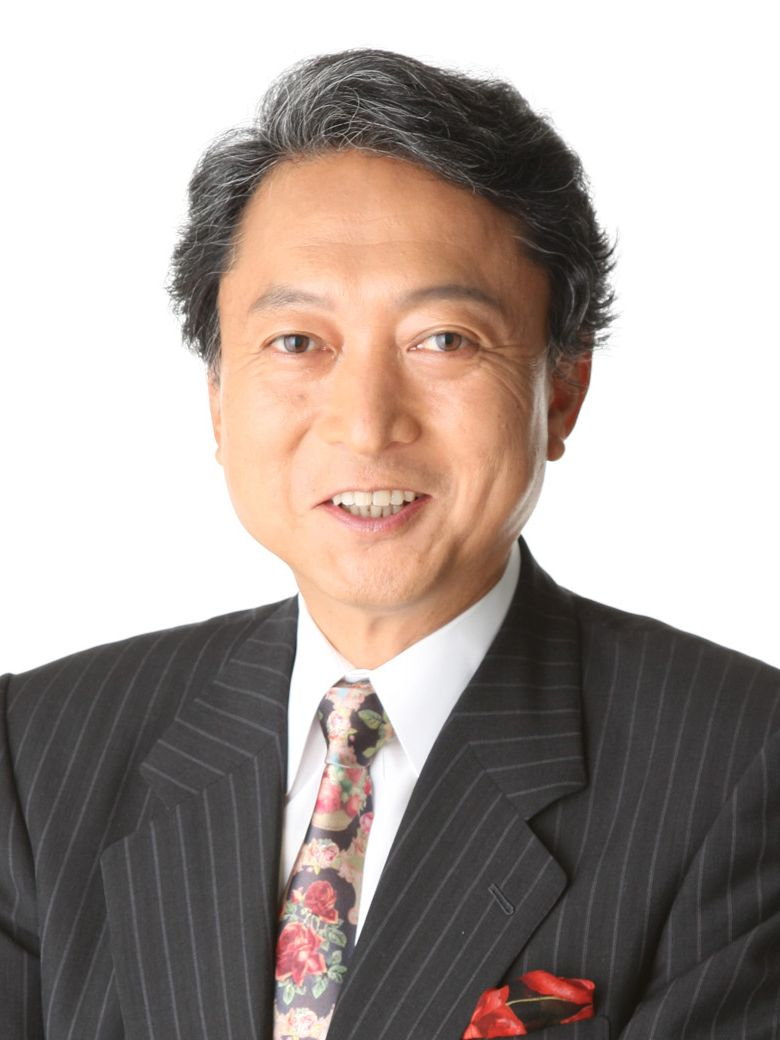

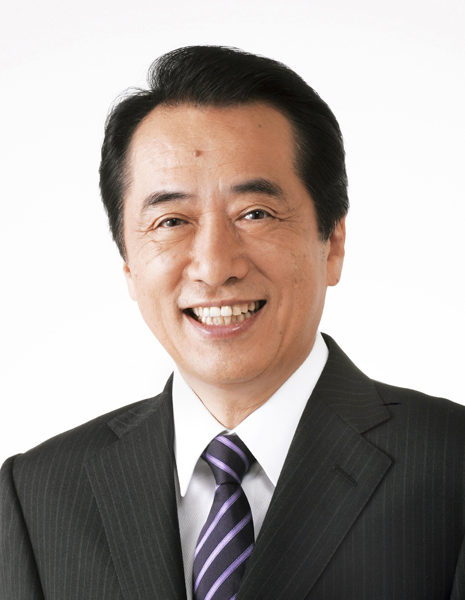

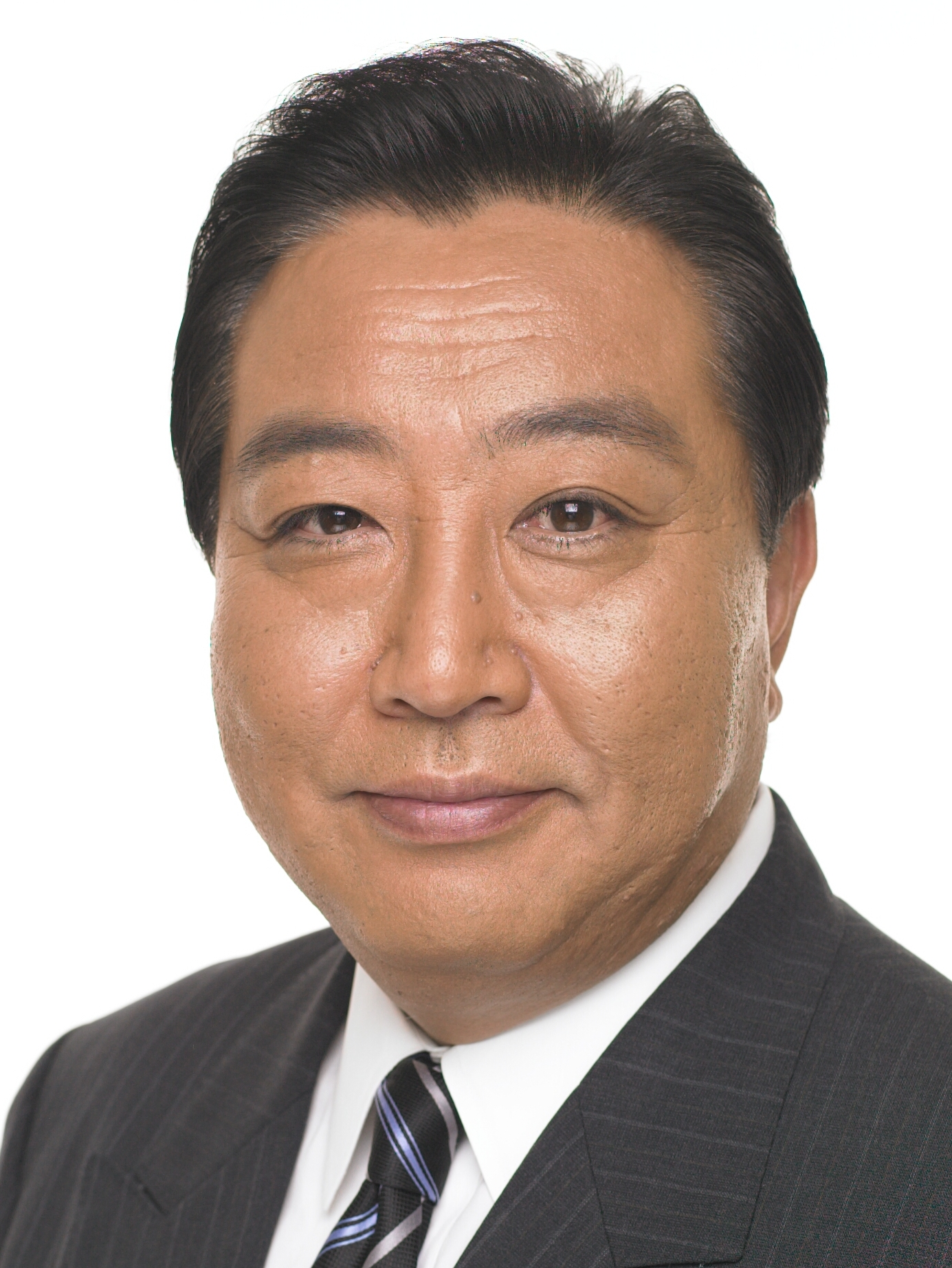

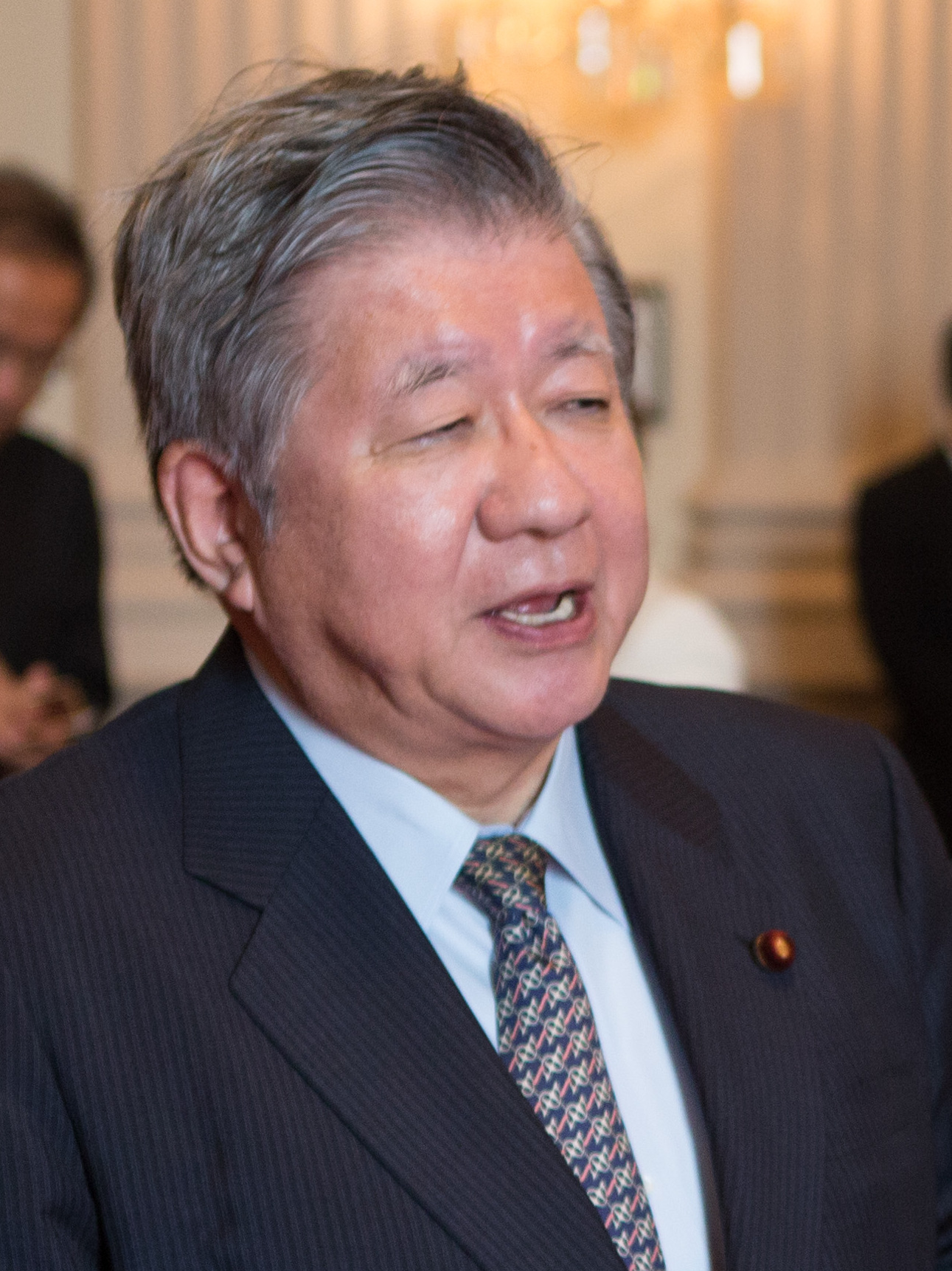
Candidate	Yukio Hatoyama	Naoto Kan
Leader's seat	Hokkaido 9th	Tokyo 18th
First round	294 (36.0%)	221 (27.1%)
Runoff	254 (51.2%)	242 (48.8%)
Candidate	Yoshihiko Noda	Takahiro Yokomichi
Leader's seat	Chiba 4th	Hokkaido 1st
First round	182 (22.3%)	119 (14.6%)
- Map of the results of the party member vote.
President before election
Yukio Hatoyama
Elected President
Yukio Hatoyama

The September 2002 Democratic Party of Japan leadership election was held on 23 September 2002 in accordance with the end of the presidential term which had commenced in 2000. Incumbent president Yukio Hatoyama was narrowly re-elected in a four-way race. In the runoff ballot between Hatoyama and fellow party co-founder Naoto Kan, the latter had a slight lead among the party's Diet members and candidates, but Hatoyama's large margin among prefectural representatives delivered him victory.

== Electoral system ==
Candidates were required to gather endorsements from twenty (maximum 25) of the party's members of the National Diet in order to stand.

The election was conducted via a points system:

- Each of the party's members of the National Diet had a vote worth two points. (366 points total)
- Registered party members or supporters could vote via mail if they had been registered by 30 August. Points for this tier were distributed between the 47 prefectures, and awarded to candidates in proportion to votes won in each prefecture. (320 points total)
- Each of the party's approved candidates for future Diet elections had a vote worth one point. (83 points total)
- Each of the party's members of local councils or prefectural assemblies could vote via mail. Points for this tier were awarded to candidates in proportion to votes won. (47 points total)

In order to win, a candidate must secure more than 50% of points. If no candidate won more than 50%, a runoff was to be held the same day.

In the event of a runoff:

- Each of the party's members of the National Diet had a vote worth two points. (366 points total)
- Each of the party's approved candidates for future Diet elections had a vote worth one point. (83 points total)
- A representative from each of the party's prefectural branches had a vote worth one point. (47 points total)

== Candidates ==
Candidate	Offices held
Yukio Hatoyama (age 55); Hokkaido	Member of the House of Representatives (1986–); President of the Democratic Party of Japan (1996–97, 1999–)
Naoto Kan (age 55); Tokyo	Member of the House of Representatives (1980–); President of the Democratic Party of Japan (1996–99); Minister of Health and Welfare (1996)
Yoshihiko Noda (age 47); Chiba Prefecture	Member of the House of Representatives (1993–96, 2000–)
Takahiro Yokomichi (age 61); Hokkaido	Member of the House of Representatives (1969–83, 1996–); Governor of Hokkaido (1983–95)

=== Sponsors ===
Yukio Hatoyama (24)	Naoto Kan (19)	Yoshihiko Noda (24)	Takahiro Yokomichi (24)
House of Representatives: Hirofumi Hirano; Ikuo Horigome; Hisako Ōishi; Eisei Ito; Koriki Jojima; Setsuya Kagita; Tatsuo Kawabata; Yasusuke Konta; Kansei Nakano; Akihiro Ohata; Masamitsu Oishi; Katsuya Okada; Sakihito Ozawa; Muneaki Samejima; Kazuya Tamaki; Koichi Yoshida; House of Councillors: Takenori Emoto; Kiyoshi Hasegawa; Kenji Hirata; Wakako Hironaka; Akira Imaizumi; Michio Sato; Kan Suzuki; Susumu Yanase	House of Representatives: Hideo Hiraoka; Satoru Ienishi; Motohisa Ikeda; Eiko Ishige; Kōki Ishii; Hajime Ishii; Koichi Kato; Takashi Kawamura; Shoichi Kondo; Yukichi Maeda; Hiroko Mizushima; Akira Nagatsuma; Nobuhiko Suto; Nobutaka Tsutsui; Osamu Yamauchi; House of Councillors: Toshihiro Asahi; Masamitsu Naito; Tomiko Okazaki; Marutei Tsurunen	House of Representatives: Jun Azumi; Motohisa Furukawa; Kōichirō Genba; Hitoshi Goto; Kazuhiro Haraguchi; Goshi Hosono; Sayuri Kamata; Kenji Kobayashi; Seiji Maehara; Yoshio Maki; Takeaki Matsumoto; Shigefumi Matsuzawa; Hisayasu Nagata; Tetsuji Nakamura; Ken Okuda; Shinji Tarutoko; Yoshio Tezuka; Shogo Tsugawa; Kiyoshi Ueda; Shu Watanabe; House of Councillors: Yoko Komiyama; Koji Matsui; Katsuya Ogawa; Kazuya Shimba	House of Representatives: Yoshio Hachiro; Shun Hayama; Ichiro Hino; Mamoru Kobayashi; Azuma Konno; Yutaka Kuwabara; Goto Masanori; Kinya Narazaki; Akira Oide; Hidenori Sasaki; Kanju Sato; Yasuko Takemura; Taneaki Tanami; Kazuhiko Tsuji; Yukio Ubukata; House of Councillors: Keiko Chiba; Mieko Kamimoto; Yukiko Kawahashi; Azuma Koshiishi; Toshihisa Matsuzaki; Naoki Minezaki; Taisuke Sato; Tsutomu Yamamoto; Yasuo Yamashita

=== Withdrew ===
- Seiji Maehara, member of the House of Representatives (1993–) – (endorsed Noda)
- Shigefumi Matsuzawa, member of the House of Representatives (1993–) – (endorsed Noda)
- Takashi Kawamura, member of the House of Representatives (1993–) – (endorsed Kan)
- Kansei Nakano, member of the House of Representatives (1976–) – (endorsed Hatoyama)

== Contest ==
Up to nine candidates were reported to be considering running amidst criticism of Hatoyama, who they viewed as lacking the leadership ability to challenge the LDP. A notable embarrassment came in November 2001, when 22 Diet members including vice-president Takahiro Yokomichi defied the party line and voted against authorising JMSDF support missions in the Indian Ocean. Hatoyama placed emphasis on party unity, while Naoto Kan pitched himself as more capable of defeating the LDP in the next elections.

Hatoyama announced his intention to seek re-election on 8 August. He stated that he would assert himself more strongly as leader if re-elected, and that he would distance himself from secretary-general Kan. Kan officially declared his candidacy on the 20th. He criticised Hatoyama as lacking in the persuasion and debate skills necessary to appeal to voters. Both campaigned on an anti-LDP and anti-bureaucracy platform.

The race exposed enduring factional divides within the party. Yokomichi, who rebelled against the party line in November, ran for leader as he had in the September 1999 race. He was considered the leader of the party's left wing, consisting of former members of the Japan Socialist Party. Party vice-president Kansei Nakano declared his candidacy with the support of the ex-Democratic Socialist Party faction. However, he withdrew shortly before nominations and switched his support to Hatoyama.

A number of junior lawmakers, organised in the "Group to Create the Second Era of the DPJ," sought leadership renewal. Four members of the group – Seiji Maehara, Yoshihiko Noda, Takashi Kawamura, and Shigefumi Matsuzawa – each declared their candidacy. Hatoyama stated that he would resign from the Diet if any of them won the leadership. All four agreed that they should unify their bids, but could not agree on who should run. At a meeting on 21 August, Matsuzawa suggested they take a vote, but Maehara and Kawamura preferred a public poll. The meeting failed and all four pledged to continue their campaigns. The situation was further complicated since both Noda and Maehara were confident they have secured enough support to stand on their own. After it became clear that Matsuzawa dropped out on the 23rd and endorsed Noda in an effort to unify the camp. A week later, Kawamura withdrew due to lack of support. He ultimately switched his support to Kan. Maehara and Noda then agreed to settle the dispute by combining the results of opinion polling with a survey of the DPJ caucus. Maehara was more popular among the public, but this was outweighed by Noda's advantage among Diet members; Maehara duly withdrew on 3 September and endorsed Noda. Noda believed that Article 9 should be amended but conceded that the public were not ready to support it.

A Kyodo News poll from August showed that Kan was the most popular candidate among the public, with 31.3% support. He was followed by Hatoyama with 13.4%, Yokomichi with 6.1%, and Nakano on 3%; Maehara, Noda, Kawamura, and Matsuzawa each polled at 2.5% or less.

At the time of nominations on 10 September, The Japan Times reported that Hatoyama was the frontrunner with about 60 legislators in his camp.

== Results ==
=== First round ===
Candidate	Diet members			Party members & supporters			Diet candidates			Local assembly members			Total
Candidate	Votes	%	Points	Votes	%	Points	Votes	%	Points	Votes	%	Points	Total
Yukio Hatoyama	63	34.4	126	56,417	35.8	126	25	30.1	25	499	36.0	17	294
Naoto Kan	45	24.6	90	41,167	26.1	94	22	26.5	22	455	32.8	15	221
Yoshihiko Noda	44	24.0	88	33,012	21.0	67	22	26.5	22	143	10.3	5	182
Takahiro Yokomichi	31	16.9	62	26,846	17.1	33	14	16.9	14	291	21.0	10	119
Total	183	100.0	366	157,442	100.0	320	83	100.0	83	1,388	100.0	47	816
Invalid	0			1,156			0			6			
Turnout	183	100.0		158,598	51.3		83	100.0		1,388	87.9		
Eligible	183			309,003			83			1,586			
Source: DPJ Archive

=== Runoff ===
Candidate	Diet members			Diet candidates			Prefectural representatives			Total
Candidate	Votes	%	Points	Votes	%	Points	Votes	%	Points	Total
Yukio Hatoyama	91	49.7	182	41	49.4	41	31	66.0	31	254
Naoto Kan	92	50.3	184	42	50.6	42	16	34.0	16	242
Total	183	100.0	366	83	100.0	83	47	100.0	47	496
Invalid	0			0			0			
Turnout	183	100.0		83	100.0		47	100.0		
Eligible	183			83			47			
Source: DPJ Archive
