= May 2004 Democratic Party of Japan leadership election =

Political party election in Japan

- 18 May 2004
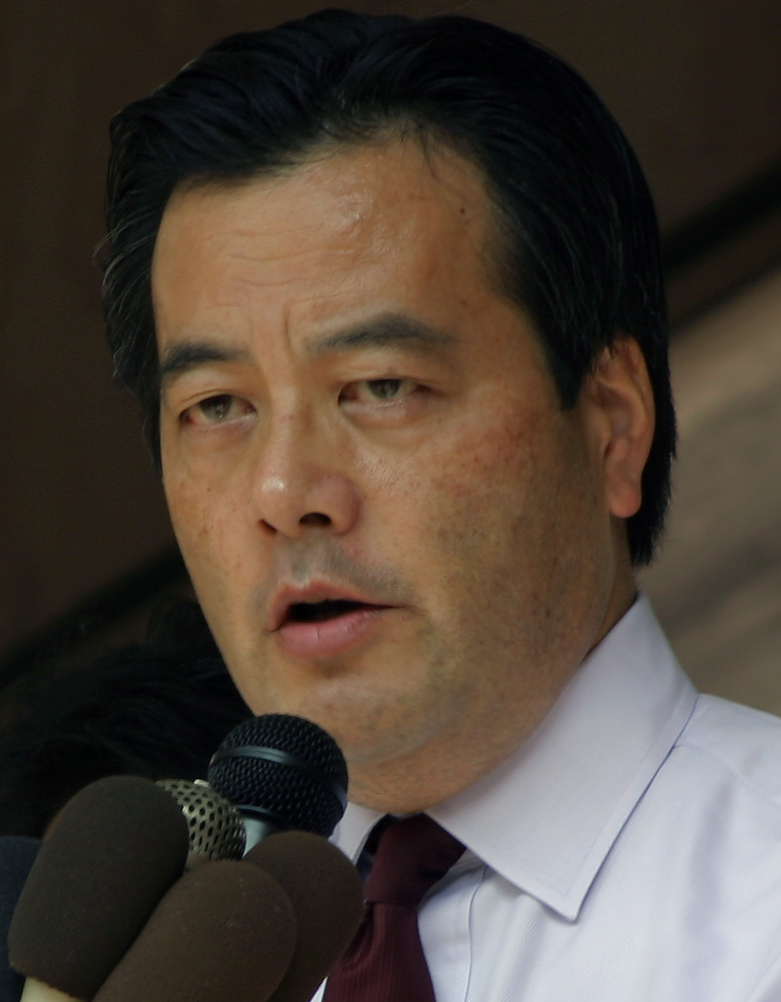
Candidate	Katsuya Okada
Leader's seat	Mie 3rd
Result	Unopposed
President before election
Naoto Kan
Elected President
Katsuya Okada

The May 2004 Democratic Party of Japan leadership election was held on 18 May 2004. The election was held to replace outgoing president Naoto Kan, who resigned following reports that he had failed to pay public pension premiums while serving as health minister in 1996.

Ichirō Ozawa initially announced his candidacy and was expected to be unopposed, but withdrew the day before nominations after revealing that he had also failed to pay pension premiums. Katsuya Okada, who had supported Ozawa, nominated instead and was elected unopposed.

== Background ==
Naoto Kan was elected to a second stint as leader in December 2002. During his tenure, he oversaw a merger with the Liberal Party, strengthening the unified opposition. He led the party to success at the 2003 election, improving its seat count and outpolling the ruling Liberal Democratic Party in the proportional representation vote, though falling short of unseating the government. Ichirō Ozawa, former Liberal Party leader, accepted the post of vice-president but remained distant from the party leadership. He declined to attend executive meetings and publicly criticised Kan.

In April 2004, a number of Japanese politicians were exposed as having failed to pay mandatory premiums for the national pension program. Kan admitted that he too had failed to do so while serving as health minister in 1996. He faced pressure to resign from DPJ members including Ozawa, but initially refused. Katsuya Okada, Yukio Edano, and Yoshihiko Noda met with Kan on 8 May and urged him to step down. Kan announced his resignation on 11 May.

== Electoral system ==
Candidates were required to gather endorsements from twenty (maximum 25) of the party's members of the National Diet in order to stand. If the election were contested, each Diet member would have been eligible to vote. If no candidate won more than 50% of votes, a runoff was to be held the same day. Nominations were taken on the 18th and the election held the same day. Okada was the only candidate to nominate and was therefore confirmed without a ballot.

== Candidates ==
Candidate	Offices held
Katsuya Okada (age 50); Mie Prefecture	Member of the House of Representatives (1990–); Secretary-General of the Democratic Party of Japan (2002–)

=== Withdrew ===
- Ichirō Ozawa, member of the House of Representatives (1969–) and former leader of the Liberal Party (1998–2003)

== Contest ==
Initially, no clear candidates emerged. Speculation centered on Ichirō Ozawa and Katsuya Okada, but both refused to stand. Okada was popular among junior legislators, while Ozawa was favoured by the party's conservative factions, including those from the former DSP. Tsutomu Hata and former president Yukio Hatoyama supported an Ozawa candidacy.

On the 13th, Okada formally asked Ozawa to stand as president, but he remained noncommittal. His allies requested that, should he stand, the regular presidential election scheduled for September should be canceled and Ozawa granted a full two-year term. He also requested greater power to choose party personnel.

The following day, he agreed to stand in the contest due on Tuesday. No other members declared their intention to stand, and Ozawa was expected to win unanimously. The day before the vote, however, he withdrew his candidacy. He stated at a press conference that he felt the need "to take responsibility" for his own failure to pay into the pension system between 1980 and 1986, though it was not mandatory at the time. The party thus turned to Okada at the last minute, who stood unopposed and was elected unanimously.
