= September 2004 Democratic Party of Japan leadership election =

Political party election in Japan

- 13 September 2004
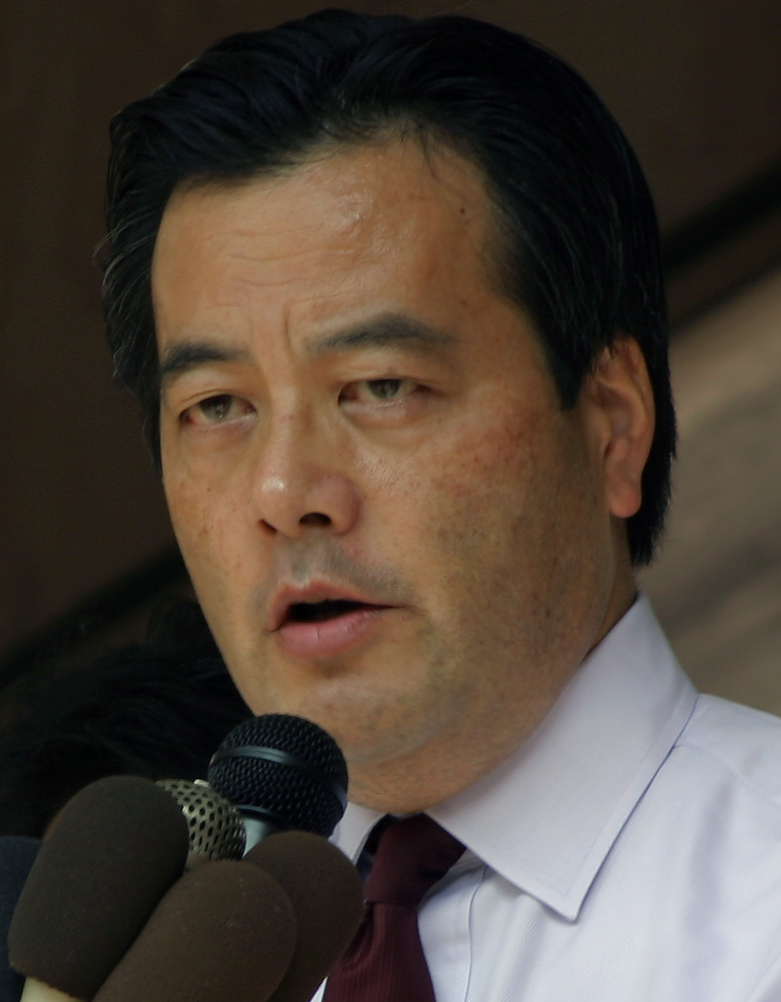
Candidate	Katsuya Okada
Leader's seat	Mie 3rd
Result	Unopposed
President before election
Katsuya Okada
Elected President
Katsuya Okada

The September 2004 Democratic Party of Japan leadership election was held on 13 September 2004 in accordance with the end of the presidential term which had commenced in 2002. Incumbent president Katsuya Okada, who took office in May, was re-elected unopposed.

== Background and contest ==
Okada became president in May as a last-minute pick following the withdrawal of Ichirō Ozawa. He led the party to great success in the July House of Councillors election, in which the DPJ won 50 seats to the ruling Liberal Democratic Party's 49.

Okada faced re-election in September. When nominations were taken on 30 August, he was the only candidate. His official list of nominators included representatives from most of the party's factions, including former president Naoto Kan, left-wing leader Takahiro Yokomichi, former Liberal Hiroshi Nakai, Hatoyama faction representative Yoshikatsu Nakayama, and junior lawmakers. While this indicated a broad range of support, the absence of Ichirō Ozawa and Yukio Hatoyama's personal nominations suggested tensions between Okada and those groups. Ozawa and Okada had contradicted one another on defence policy in recent months, with the president staking out a revisionist position on Article 9.

Okada was re-elected unopposed on 13 September.

== Candidates ==
Candidate	Offices held
Katsuya Okada (age 51); Mie Prefecture	Member of the House of Representatives (1990–); President of the Democratic Party of Japan (2004–)
