= Nōgyōsha kobetsu shotoku hoshō seido =

Japanese agrarian policy

The Nōgyōsha kobetsu shotoku hoshō seido (農業者戸別所得補償制度,, English, Farmers' Door-to-door Compensation System) is an agrarian policy to support farmers in Japan. It was proposed and implemented by the Democratic Party of Japan (DPJ) which presented the bill to the Japanese Diet (parliament) in 2010, following its original inclusion in the DPJ's manifestos for both the 2007 Councillors and 2009 Representatives elections.

The bill was introduced in the Diet in October 2007, and the legislation passed in the House of Councillors in November, but it was defeated in the House of Representatives of Japan in May 2008. After the DPJ's victory in the 45th House of Representatives election in 2009, the policy began to be implemented in 2010 and will become fully effective in 2011.

== Description ==
The law provides government subsidies to support farmers whose main agricultural product is rice, oats or soy beans, at a level depending on certain production targets which are decided by prefectural and city governments and municipalities based on a food self-sufficiency rate target.

The subsidies are calculated based on the difference between the nationwide average production cost and the nationwide average retail price. The payment has several additional components including a reward for quality, distribution method (e.g. selling in a direct marketing shop), effort of manufacturing (e.g. promotion of rice flour), expansion of management level, environmental conservation measures such as creation diversity, production of cereals that substitute for rice (includes rice for ground rice and animal feed rice), etc.

== Contemporary condition ==
In the 2010 request for budget appropriations, a total of 800 million yen (US$561 billion) for paddy farming was allocated in the model countermeasure of the budget. The countermeasure consists of a "rice farm income indemnity model programme" and a project to raise self-sufficiency in field applications (水田利活用自給力向上事業).

The former covers farmers who produce rice subject to a production target, and the latter gives farm households whose products include oats, soy beans, rice powder, and rice for use as forage, subsidies at the same level of income as that of farmers producing rice as a primary product.

The government did not insist on full participation in the self-sufficiency project, and farmers may withdraw from the rice product subsidy scheme.

Every farmer participating in this scheme was given a basic subsidy at a rate of 10,000 yen per are (100 square metres).
