= 2000 Democratic Party of Japan leadership election =

Political party election in Japan

- 9 September 2000
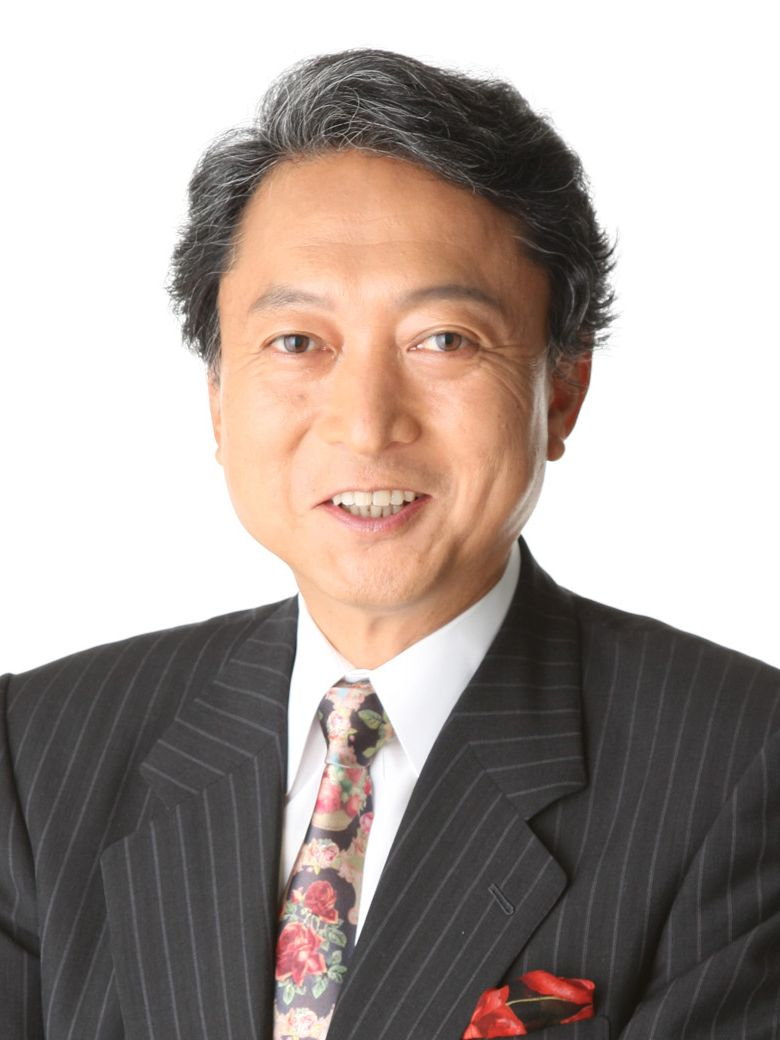
| Candidate | Yukio Hatoyama |
| Leader's seat | Hokkaido 9th |
| Result | Unopposed |
President before election
Yukio Hatoyama
Elected President
Yukio Hatoyama

The 2000 Democratic Party of Japan leadership election was held on 9 September 2000 in accordance with the end of the presidential term which had commenced in 1999. Incumbent president Yukio Hatoyama was re-elected unopposed.

== Electoral system ==
Candidates were required to gather endorsements from twenty (maximum 25) of the party's members of the National Diet in order to stand.

If it was contested, the election was to be conducted via a points system:

- Each of the party's members of the National Diet had a vote worth two points. (364 points total)
- Registered party members or supporters (1,000 yen fee) could vote via mail if they had been registered by 31 August. Points for this tier were distributed between the 47 prefectures, and awarded to candidates in proportion to votes won in each prefecture. (343 points total)

The party also arranged for internet voting to be available. Hatoyama was the only candidate to nominate and was therefore confirmed without a ballot.

== Candidates ==
| Candidate | Offices held |
|---|---|
| Yukio Hatoyama (age 53); Hokkaido | Member of the House of Representatives (1986–); President of the Democratic Party of Japan (1999–) |

=== Withdrew ===
- Takashi Kawamura, member of the House of Representatives (1993–)
- Yoko Komiyama, member of the House of Councillors (1998–)
