= 2005 Democratic Party of Japan leadership election =

Political party election in Japan

- 17 September 2005
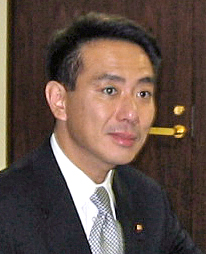

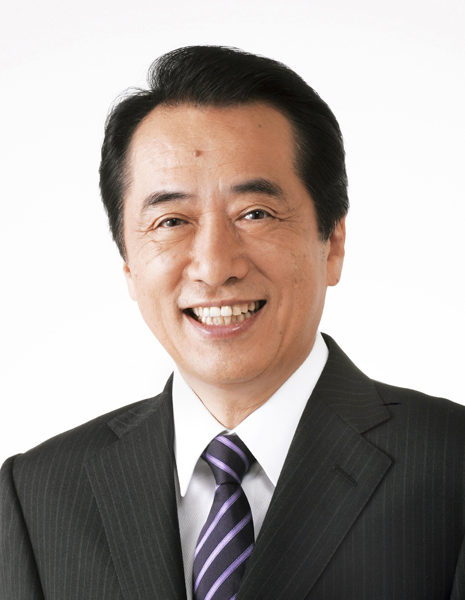
Candidate	Seiji Maehara	Naoto Kan
Leader's seat	Kyoto 2nd	Tokyo 18th
Caucus vote	96	94
Percentage	50.5%	49.5%
President before election
Katsuya Okada
Elected President
Seiji Maehara

The 2005 Democratic Party of Japan leadership election was held on 17 September 2005. The election was held to replace outgoing president Katsuya Okada, who resigned following the party's losses at the 2005 Japanese general election. Seiji Maehara defeated former leader Naoto Kan by a margin of just two votes to become the new president.

== Electoral system ==
Candidates were required to gather endorsements from twenty (maximum 25) of the party's members of the National Diet in order to stand. Each Diet member was eligible to vote (194 total). If no candidate won more than 50% of votes, a runoff was to be held the same day. Nominations were taken on the 17th and the election held the same day.

== Candidates ==
Candidate	Offices held
Seiji Maehara (age 43); Kyoto Prefecture	Member of the House of Representatives (1993–)
Naoto Kan (age 58); Tokyo	Member of the House of Representatives (1980–); President of the Democratic Party of Japan (1996–99, 2002–04); Minister of Health and Welfare (1996)

=== Sponsors ===
Seiji Maehara (20)	Naoto Kan (20)
House of Representatives: Jun Azumi; Yutaka Banno; Osamu Fujimura; Motohisa Furukawa; Kenta Izumi; Yoko Komiyama; Yōsuke Kondō; Sumio Mabuchi; Takeaki Matsumoto; Akihisa Nagashima; Masaharu Nakagawa; Yoshihiko Noda; Kan Suzuki; Koichi Takemasa; Shu Watanabe; House of Councillors: Wakako Hironaka; Koji Matsui; Renhō; Kazuya Shimba; Hideki Wakabayashi	House of Representatives: Tetsundo Iwakuni; Hiroshi Kawauchi; Issei Koga; Shoichi Kondo; Kazuko Kōri; Chinami Nishimura; Akihiro Ohata; Yoshinori Suematsu; Manabu Terata; Keisuke Tsumura; Masahiko Yamada; Michiyoshi Yunoki; House of Councillors: Keiko Chiba; Kenzo Fujisue; Shinkun Haku; Tatsuo Hirano; Mieko Kamimoto; Shoukichi Kina; Yoriko Madoka; Kiyoshige Maekawa

=== Withdrew ===
- Takashi Kawamura, member of the House of Representatives (1993–)

== Contest ==
Initial speculated candidates included Ichirō Ozawa, Naoto Kan, and Yukio Hatoyama. Maehara announced his candidacy on 14 September. Yoshihiko Noda was approached by supporters to run, but stated he was supporting Maehara. At a party meeting on the 15th, some members favoured uniting around a single candidate, while others called for an open process with multiple contenders. Ozawa suggested he was open to running, but announced on the 16th that he would not: "I am in a position where I must take some of the blame for the defeat in the election." Takashi Kawamura attempted to run but was unable to gather sufficient support.

Kan was viewed as the frontrunner with a strong base of support: he was supported by Takahiro Yokomichi's faction and many members of the Hatoyama and Ozawa factions, including Hatoyama himself and close Ozawa aide Tatsuo Hirano. However, the Hatoyama, Ozawa, and ex-DSP factions made no official endorsement and allowed a free vote, making the election unpredictable. Maehara ran as a reformer, supported by junior legislators, and pledged to appoint personnel on the basis of merit instead of seniority or factional balance. He was supported by Yoshihiko Noda and Motohisa Furukawa, and the Asahi reported that a majority of ex-DSP faction members would support him. Commentators suggested that his pitch for renewal and reform won over undecided legislators. In 2015, journalist Akiko Azumi stated that Maehara's emotional final pitch, in which he spoke of his late father who died by suicide during his childhood, was the deciding factor.

== Results ==
Candidate	Votes	%
Seiji Maehara	96	50.5
Naoto Kan	94	49.5
Total	190	100.00
Invalid	2	
Turnout	192	99.0
Eligible	194	
Source: DPJ Archive
