= January 1999 Democratic Party of Japan leadership election =

Political party election in Japan

- 18 January 1999
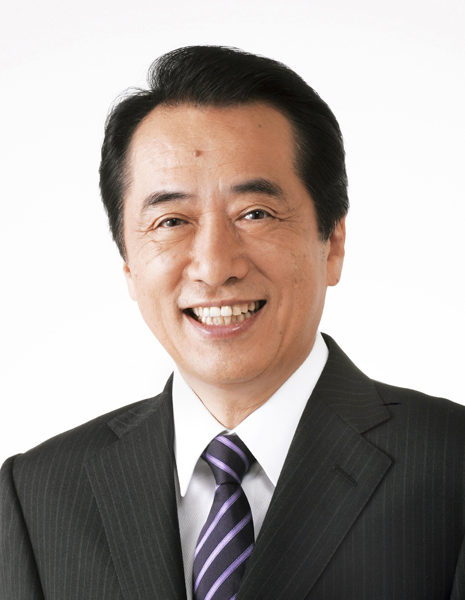

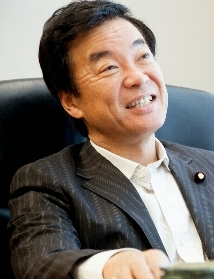
Candidate	Naoto Kan	Shigefumi Matsuzawa
Leader's seat	Tokyo 18th	Kanagawa 9th
Caucus vote	180	51
Percentage	77.9%	22.1%
President before election
Naoto Kan
Elected President
Naoto Kan

The January 1999 Democratic Party of Japan leadership election was held on 18 January 1999. Incumbent president Naoto Kan was re-elected, defeating Shigefumi Matsuzawa in a landslide.

== Background and contest ==
Kan had led the Democratic Party since its foundation in 1996, initially alongside Yukio Hatoyama, then alone from 1997. During 1998, he had overseen the merger with other opposition parties which established the party as the second-largest in the country, and wrested control of the House of Councillors from the Liberal Democratic government in the 1998 election. He came up for re-election at the peak of his popularity and was considered assured of victory. He was supported by Hatoyama and secretary-general Tsutomu Hata.

While Kan had been expected to be unopposed, he was challenged by Shigefumi Matsuzawa, a junior lawmaker serving his second term in the Diet. He stated he ran to challenge the leadership and call for more involvement for junior legislators, and proved more popular than expected.

== Electoral system ==
Candidates were required to gather endorsements from twenty (maximum 25) of the party's members of the National Diet in order to stand. Each Diet member was eligible to vote, as were two representatives from each of the party's prefectural branches. A total of 239 people were eligible to vote (145 Diet members and 94 prefectural representatives).

== Candidates ==
Candidate	Offices held
Naoto Kan (age 52); Tokyo	Member of the House of Representatives (1980–); President of the Democratic Party of Japan (1996–); Minister of Health and Welfare (1996)
Shigefumi Matsuzawa (age 40); Kanagawa Prefecture	Member of the House of Representatives (1993–)

=== Sponsors ===
Naoto Kan (≥20)	Shigefumi Matsuzawa (23)
Unknown	House of Representatives: Jun Azumi; Yukio Edano; Osamu Fujimura; Yukihisa Fujita; Motohisa Furukawa; Kazuhiro Haraguchi; Tetsundo Iwakuni; Takashi Kawamura; Hiroshi Kawauchi; Seiji Maehara; Masaharu Nakagawa; Ken Okuda; Sakihito Ozawa; Kou Tanaka; Shinji Tarutoko; Kiyoshi Ueda; Shu Watanabe; Takashi Yamamoto; Koichi Yoshida; House of Councillors: Takenori Emoto; Katsuya Ogawa; Toshio Ogawa; Susumu Yanase

== Results ==
Candidate	Votes	%
Naoto Kan	180	77.9
Shigefumi Matsuzawa	51	22.1
Total	231	100.0
Invalid	2	
Turnout	233	97.5
Eligible	239	
Source: DPJ Archive
