= September 1999 Democratic Party of Japan leadership election =

Political party election in Japan

- 25 September 1999
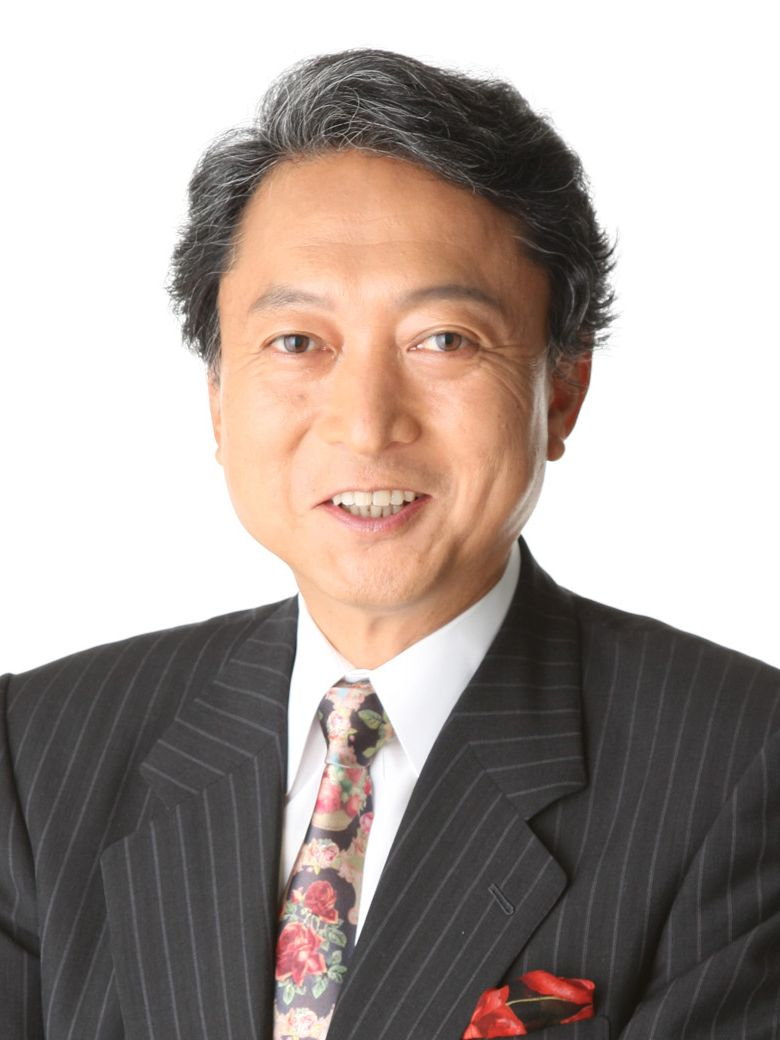

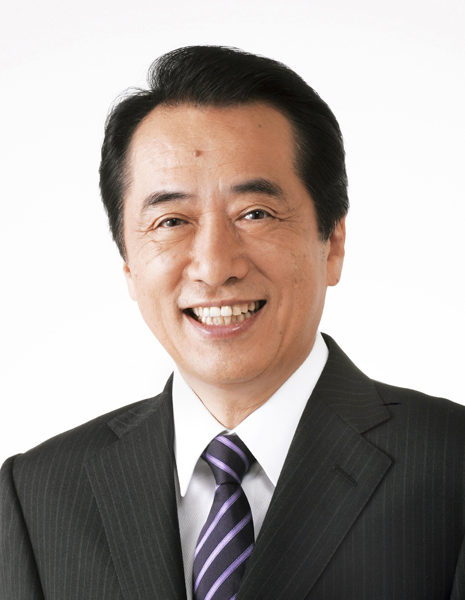

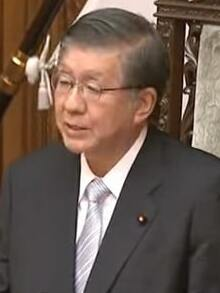
Candidate	Yukio Hatoyama	Naoto Kan	Takahiro Yokomichi
Leader's seat	Hokkaido 9th	Tokyo 18th	Hokkaido 1st
First round	154 (48.1%)	109 (34.1%)	57 (17.8%)
Runoff	182 (58.3%)	130 (41.7%)
President before election
Naoto Kan
Elected President
Yukio Hatoyama

The September 1999 Democratic Party of Japan leadership election was held on 25 September 1999. Incumbent president Naoto Kan sought re-election but was defeated by party co-founder Yukio Hatoyama. Hatoyama came up just short of a majority on the first ballot, and won 182 votes to Kan's 130 on a runoff.

== Background and contest ==
Kan had led the Democratic Party since its foundation in 1996, initially alongside Yukio Hatoyama, then alone from 1997. During 1998, he had overseen the merger with other opposition parties which established the party as the second-largest in the country, and wrested control of the House of Councillors from the Liberal Democratic government in the 1998 election. However, this was undercut the following January when the LDP formed a coalition with the Komeito and Liberal parties, allowing them to dominate that year's Diet session and sideline the DPJ. Kan's leadership came under question due to this, dissatisfaction with his decision making, and internal disunity. On 24 August, Kan announced that he would seek re-election as leader; Hatoyama declared his own candidacy two days later.

Kan faced difficulties securing the twenty nominations required to run; he pledged to change his leadership style if re-elected. Hatoyama stated he would "raise a flag of new liberalism against growing conservatism" and reform the party's leadership structure. The three candidates spoke at fourteen cities over two weeks in the leadup to the election, finishing in Tokyo.

The party's 146 Diet members were eligible to vote in the election, as well as 81 approved candidates for the next election, and 94 representatives of DPJ prefectural chapters. Within the party, Kan was considered a "middle of the road" liberal democrat, while Hatoyama was considered more conservative. The Japan Times reported that Hatoyama was close to majority support within the party, but that most of Yokomichi's supporters would favour Kan in a runoff ballot.

== Electoral system ==
Candidates were required to gather endorsements from twenty (maximum 25) of the party's members of the National Diet in order to stand. Each Diet member was eligible to vote, as were approved candidate for upcoming Diet elections, and two representatives from each of the party's prefectural branches. A total of 321 people were eligible to vote (146 Diet members, 81 approved candidates, and 94 prefectural representatives). If no candidate won more than 50% of votes, a runoff was to be held the same day.

== Candidates ==
Candidate	Offices held
Yukio Hatoyama (age 52); Hokkaido	Member of the House of Representatives (1986–); President of the Democratic Party of Japan (1996–97)
Naoto Kan (age 52); Tokyo	Member of the House of Representatives (1980–); President of the Democratic Party of Japan (1996–); Minister of Health and Welfare (1996)
Takahiro Yokomichi (age 58); Hokkaido	Member of the House of Representatives (1969–83, 1996–); Governor of Hokkaido (1983–95)

=== Sponsors ===
Yukio Hatoyama (20)	Naoto Kan (20)	Takahiro Yokomichi (20)
House of Representatives: Osamu Fujimura; Yukihisa Fujita; Motohisa Furukawa; Kōki Ishii; Tadamasa Kodaira; Issei Koga; Kodo Kohata; Shigefumi Matsuzawa; Akihiro Ohata; Kazuya Tamaki; Keishu Tanaka; Kou Tanaka; Kiyoshi Ueda; Shu Watanabe; Koichi Yoshida; House of Councillors: Ryohei Adachi; Yoko Komiyama; Katsuya Ogawa; Akihisa Terasaki; Susumu Yanase	House of Representatives: Ryuichi Doi; Satoru Ienishi; Motohisa Ikeda; Eiko Ishige; Takashi Kawamura; Shoichi Kondo; Yuiko Matsumoto; Ryu Matsumoto; Shingo Nakagiri; Yoshinori Suematsu; Joji Yamamoto; House of Councillors: Toshihiro Asahi; Wakako Hironaka; Mie Ishida; Mototaka Ito; Mineo Koyama; Yoriko Madoka; Masamitsu Naito; Tomiko Okazaki; Mitsuru Sakurai	House of Representatives: Hirotaka Akamatsu; Masanori Goto; Yoshio Hachiro; Chuji Ito; Tetsundo Iwakuni; Yutaka Kuwabara; Tomio Sakagami; Hidenori Sasaki; Kazuhiko Tsuji; Yukio Ubukata; Kosuke Uehara; Tsutomu Yamamoto; House of Councillors: Ichiro Hino; Yukiko Kawahashi; Azuma Koshiishi; Wataru Kubo; Toshihisa Matsuzaki; Taisuke Sato; Yoshimitsu Takashima; Yasuko Takemura

== Results ==
Candidate	First round		Runoff	
Candidate	Votes	%	Votes	%
Yukio Hatoyama	154	48.1	182	58.3
Naoto Kan	109	34.1	130	41.7
Takahiro Yokomichi	57	17.8		
Total	320	100.00	312	100.0
Invalid	1		2	
Turnout	321	100.0	314	97.8
Eligible	321		321	
Source: DPJ Archive
