= September 2010 Democratic Party of Japan leadership election =

Political party election in Japan

- 14 September 2010
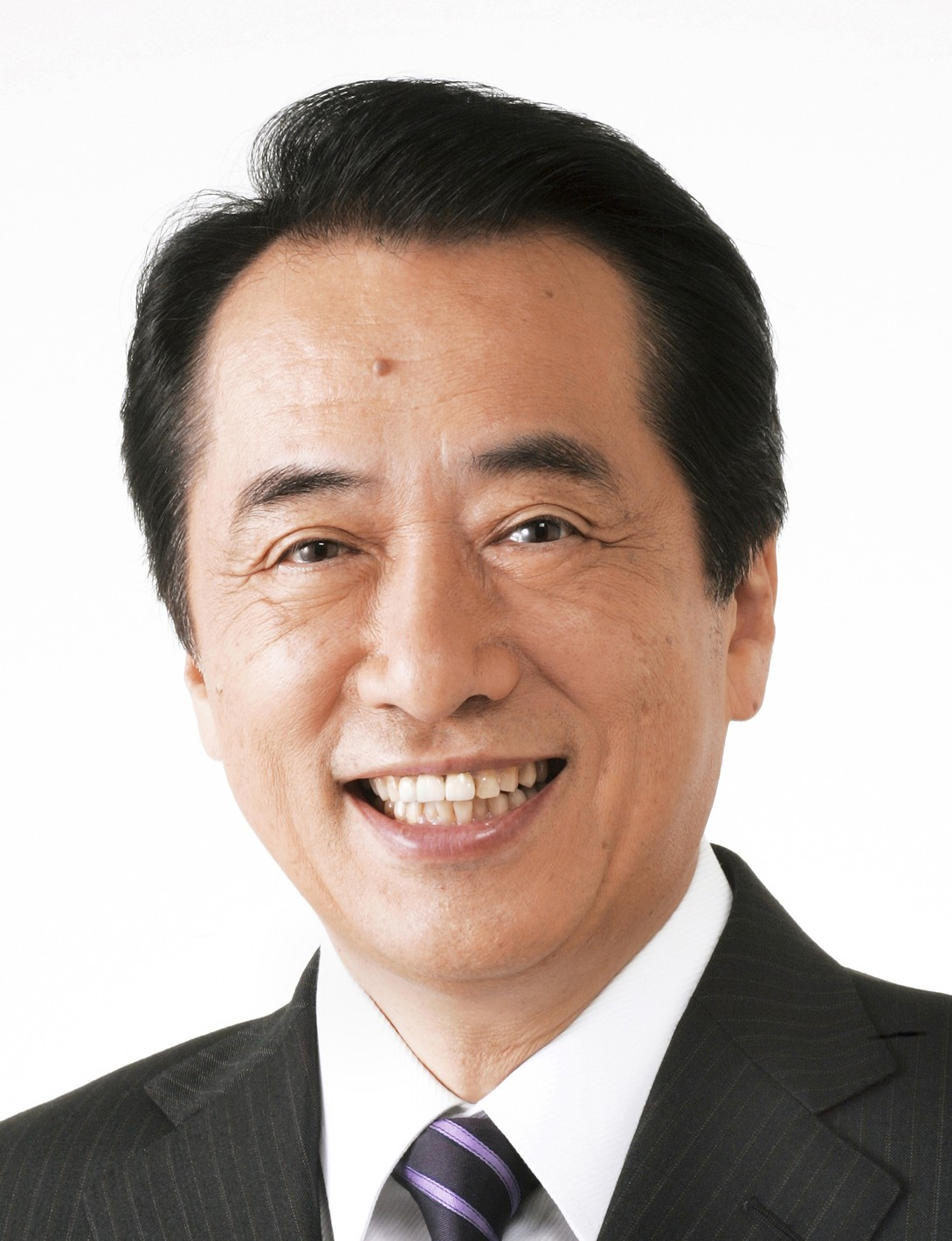

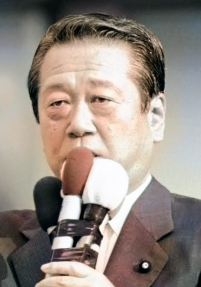
Candidate	Naoto Kan	Ichirō Ozawa
Leader's seat	Tokyo 18th	Iwate 4th
Diet members	412	400
Party members	249	51
Local assembly	60	40
Total points	721 (59.5%)	491 (40.5%)
- Map of the results of the party member vote.
President before election
Naoto Kan
Elected President
Naoto Kan

The September 2010 Democratic Party of Japan leadership election was held on 14 September 2010, in accordance with the end of the presidential term which had commenced in 2008. Incumbent president Naoto Kan, who was elected in June, sought a full term. He was challenged by former leader Ichirō Ozawa. Kan won by a comfortable margin of 721 points to Ozawa's 491, an unexpectedly clear victory.

== Background ==
Ichirō Ozawa was originally re-elected to a two-year term as president of the DPJ in September 2008, but resigned the following May amidst a corruption scandal. He was succeeded by Yukio Hatoyama, who formed a leadership "troika" with Ozawa and Naoto Kan. Ozawa was appointed deputy leader and head of election strategy, while Kan handled Diet affairs and public relations. The three led the party to a landslide victory in the August 2009 election, and Kan was appointed deputy prime minister while Ozawa became secretary-general, effectively running the party while Hatoyama and Kan focused on government. However, Hatoyama was forced to resign in June 2010 amid coalition conflicts, foreign policy blunder, and another corruption scandal surrounding Ozawa. The latter also resigned his post at the same time. Kan was chosen as Hatoyama's successor with support from most of the party's factions.

Kan distanced himself from Ozawa once in office, appointing critics Yukio Edano and Yoshito Sengoku to key leadership roles. He also adopted fiscally conservative positions, such as raising the consumption tax, which Ozawa opposed. Though relegated to the backbenches, Ozawa retained the loyalty of many members of the party and controlled its largest faction. Kan suffered a major setback in July when the government lost its majority in the upper house election, greatly damaging its ability to pass legislation. With the scheduled end of the presidential term approaching in September, Kan intended to seek re-election despite increasing criticism, particularly from Ozawa and his faction.

In mid-August, signs emerged of an alliance between Ozawa and former Prime Minister Hatoyama. With his support, Ozawa announced on the 26th that he would contest the election against Kan. By this time, the level of destabilisation within the government led to fears that the party could split. Hatoyama and Azuma Koshiishi thus attempted to mediate between Ozawa and Kan on the eve of nominations on the 31st. The former demanded the removal of Edano and Sengoku, which Kan refused to do; talks thus broke down and both forged on with their candidacies. After this, Hatoyama reiterated his support for Ozawa.

== Electoral system ==
Candidates were required to gather endorsements from twenty (maximum 25) of the party's members of the National Diet in order to stand.

The election was conducted via a points system:

- Each of the party's members of the National Diet had a vote worth two points. (812 points total)
- Registered party members or supporters could vote via mail if they had been registered by 25 August. Each House of Representative constituency had one point, awarded to the most voted candidate in that constituency. (300 points total)
- Each of the party's members of local councils or prefectural assemblies could vote via mail. Points for this tier were awarded to candidates in proportion to votes won. (100 points total)

In order to win, a candidate must secure more than 50% of points. If no candidate won more than 50%, a runoff was to be held the same day. In the runoff, only Diet members could vote. Nominations were taken on 1 September and the election held on the 14th.

== Candidates ==
Candidate	Offices held
Naoto Kan (age 63); Tokyo	Member of the House of Representatives (1980–); President of the Democratic Party of Japan (1996–99, 2002–04, 2010–); Prime Minister of Japan (2010–)
Ichirō Ozawa (age 68); Iwate Prefecture	Member of the House of Representatives (1969–); President of the Democratic Party of Japan (2006–09); Secretary-General of the Democratic Party of Japan (2009–10)

=== Sponsors ===
Naoto Kan (25)	Ichirō Ozawa (25)
House of Representatives: Ryuichi Doi; Osamu Fujimura; Kazue Fujita; Kōichirō Genba; Yoshio Hachiro; Masae Ido; Tadashi Kanamori; Makiko Kikuta; Seiji Maehara; Seishu Makino; Akira Nagatsuma; Masaharu Nakagawa; Yoshihiko Noda; Katsuya Okada; Mitsunori Okamoto; Kōzō Watanabe; Shiori Yamao; House of Councillors: Satsuki Eda; Shinkun Haku; Kumiko Hayashi; Hajime Ishii; Masako Ōkawara; Toshimi Kitazawa; Tomiko Okazaki; Renhō	House of Representatives: Hirotaka Akamatsu; Yutaka Banno; Banri Kaieda; Hiroshi Kawauchi; Shūhei Kishimoto; Toshiaki Koizumi; Yorihisa Matsuno; Inao Minayoshi; Wakio Mitsui; Fumiyoshi Murakami; Yoshikatsu Nakayama; Kuniyoshi Noda; Kazumi Ota; Hirofumi Ryu; Mieko Tanaka; House of Councillors: Tsukasa Iwamoto; Minoru Kawasaki; Takeshi Maeda; Masayoshi Nataniya; Tsutomu Okubo; Norio Takeuchi; Naoki Tanaka; Ryoko Tani; Itsuki Toyama; Harunobu Yonenaga

== Campaign ==
The campaign revolved primarily around policy. Ozawa advocated adhering to the party's 2009 election manifesto, which promised tax cuts and investment in areas such as healthcare, education, and infrastructure under the slogan "putting people's lives first". Kan argued that a change in policy was necessary in light of the economic situation and Japan's large budget deficit, which he aimed to reduce by raising the consumption tax and reducing expenditure. Ozawa also faced significant criticism over his recurrent corruption scandals: at the time of the election, he was under investigation for financial misappropriation. Kan said of Ozawa: "his way of politics is based on financial strength and the large numbers in his group. It is deeply coloured by the principle of money and numbers." Kan ran on the slogan "clean and open politics", and called for corporate political donations to be banned, while Ozawa called only for making donations public.

An opinion poll published in The Asahi Shimbun found that 65 percent of the general public preferred Kan as prime minister compared to 17 percent for Ozawa. Among DPJ supporters, the results were 73 percent for Kan and 20 for Ozawa. The same poll also found approval of the Kan cabinet at 49 percent, an increase of 12 points from the previous month. Another poll in The Nikkei found 73 percent preferred Kan compared to 17 for Ozawa.

Despite public opinion strongly favouring Kan, he was not certain to win since the Diet caucus held the lion's share of voting power. Ozawa was believed to hold a narrow lead among the party's 412 legislators. Media attributed about 150 members to Ozawa's faction, in addition to a majority of the 50-60 members of Hatoyama's. He was also supported by the Hata faction (~15 members), while the ex-JSP group (~30) was split. Apart from Hatoyama, he was supported by Tsutomu Hata, Azuma Koshiishi, and Hirotaka Akamatsu. Kan's backing was scattered between his own faction (~40-50) and those of Seiji Maehara (~40) and Yoshihiko Noda (~30). On 11 September, The Asahi Shimbun reported that Ozawa led Kan among diet members 193 (149 confirmed, 44 likely) to 183 (152 confirmed, 31 likely), but Kan was close to a majority of local assembly members, supported by 48% compared to Ozawa's 30%. On the eve of the contest on the 13th, The Nikkei reported the Kan had the lead due to support from members and local assembly officials, while Ozawa was attempting to close the gap by winning over undecided Diet members.

The announcement of the results was streamed online by TBS via Ustream. The event was viewed by 270,000 unique users, the highest traffic ever from Asia, indicating a high level of interest in the race.

== Results ==
Candidate	Diet members			Party members & supporters			Local assembly members			Total
Candidate	Votes	%	Points	Votes	%	Points	Votes	%	Points	Total
Naoto Kan	206	50.7	412	137,998	60.5	249	1,360	59.5	60	721
Ichirō Ozawa	200	49.3	400	90,194	39.5	51	927	40.5	40	491
Total	406	100.0	812	228,192	100.0	300	2,287	100.0	100	1,212
Invalid	3			838			7			
Turnout	409	99.5		229,030	66.9		2,294	96.3		
Eligible	411			342,493			2,382			
Source: DPJ Archive
