= Democratic Party of Japan =

Japanese political party (1998–2014)

Democratic Party of Japan 民主党 Minshutō
- Abbreviation: DPJ
- Founders: Naoto Kan; Yukio Hatoyama; Tsutomu Hata
- Founded: 27 April 1998; 28 years ago
- Dissolved: 27 March 2016; 10 years ago
- Merger of: Democratic Party (1996); Good Governance Party; New Fraternity Party; Democratic Reform Party
- Succeeded by: Democratic Party (2016)
- Headquarters: 1-11-1 Nagata-cho, Chiyoda, Tokyo 100-0014
- Newspaper: Press Democracy
- Membership (2015): ▼233,100
- Ideology: Liberalism (Japanese); Social liberalism; Factions: Conservatism (Japanese); Social democracy
- Political position: Centre to centre-left Factions: Centre-right
- International affiliation: Alliance of Democrats (2005–2012)
- Colors: Red

Party flag

Website
- www.dpj.or.jp

The Democratic Party of Japan (Japanese: 民主党, Hepburn: Minshutō) was a centrist to centre-left, liberal or social-liberal political party in Japan from 1998 to 2016. It was the main opposition to the Liberal Democratic Party from 1998 to 2009 and from 2012 to 2016, as well as the ruling party of Japan from 2009 to 2012. It is not to be confused with the now-defunct Japan Democratic Party that merged with the Liberal Party in 1955 to form the Liberal Democratic Party. It is also different from another Democratic Party, which was established in 1947 and dissolved in 1950.

The party's origins lie in the previous Democratic Party of Japan, which was founded in September 1996 by politicians of the centre-right and centre-left with roots in the Liberal Democratic Party and Japan Socialist Party. In April 1998, the previous DPJ merged with splinters of the New Frontier Party to create a new party which retained the DPJ name. In the 2000 general election, the party won 127 seats, firmly establishing it as the main opposition party. In 2003, the party was joined by the Liberal Party of Ichirō Ozawa and won 177 seats in the 2003 general election. 2004 House of Councillors election, the DPJ won a seat more than the LDP. The party lost 64 seats in the 2005 general election, with its seats being decreased to 113. Nevertheless, the party won further seats in the 2007 House of Councillors election, becoming the largest party in the House of Councillors and creating the first divided Diet since 1999.

Following the 2009 election, the DPJ became the ruling party in the House of Representatives, defeating the long-dominant LDP in a landslide and gaining the largest number of seats in both the House of Representatives and the House of Councillors. During its time in office, the DPJ was beset by internal conflicts and struggled to implement many of its proposed policies. Legislative productivity under the DPJ was particularly low, falling to levels unprecedented in recent Japanese history according to some measures. However, the DPJ implemented a number of progressive measures during its time in office such as the provision of free public schooling through high school, increases in child-rearing subsidies, expanded unemployment insurance coverage, extended duration of a housing allowance, and stricter regulations safeguarding part-time and temporary workers.

The DPJ lost its majority in the House of Councillors in the 2010 election. The party was ousted from government by the LDP in the 2012 general election. It retained 57 seats in the lower house, and still had 88 seats in the upper house. On 27 March 2016, the DPJ merged with the Japan Innovation Party and Vision of Reform to form the Democratic Party (Minshintō), which in turn merged with the Party of Hope on 7 May 2018 to form the Democratic Party For the People, while a significant number of members split to form the Constitutional Democratic Party of Japan on 3 October 2017 and on 15 September 2020.

== History ==
=== Beginnings ===
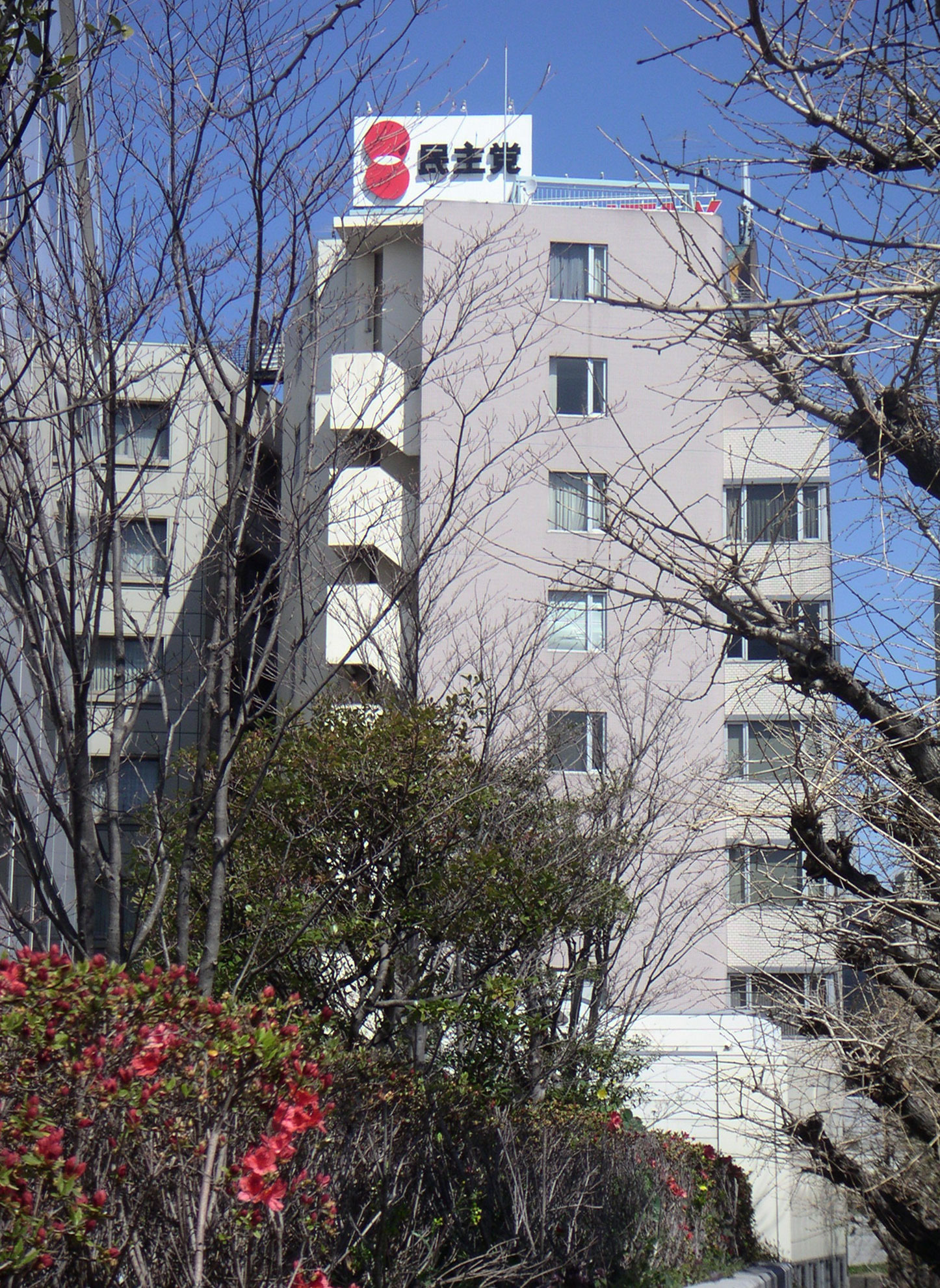
Headquarters of the Democratic Party of Japan

The Democratic Party of Japan (DPJ) was formed on 27 April 1998. It was a merger of four previously independent parties that were opposed to the ruling Liberal Democratic Party (LDP)—the previous Democratic Party of Japan, the Good Governance Party (民政党, Minseitō), the New Fraternity Party (新党友愛, Shintō-Yūai), and the Democratic Reform Party (民主改革連合, Minshu-Kaikaku-Rengō). The previous parties ranged in ideology from conservative to social-democratic. The new party began with ninety-three members of the House of Representatives and thirty-eight members of the House of Councilors. Moreover, the party officials were elected as well at the party convention for the first time; Naoto Kan, former Health and Welfare Minister was appointed as the president of the party and Tsutomu Hata, former prime minister as secretary-general.

On 24 September 2003, the party formally merged with the small, centre-right Liberal Party led by Ichirō Ozawa in a move largely considered in preparation for the 2003 general election held on 9 November 2003. This move immediately gave the DPJ eight more seats in the House of Councilors.

In the 2003 general election, the DPJ gained a total of 178 seats. This was short of their objectives, but nevertheless a significant demonstration of the new group's strength. Following a pension scandal, Naoto Kan resigned and was replaced with moderate liberal Katsuya Okada.

In the 2004 House of Councillors election, the DPJ won a seat more than the ruling Liberal Democrats, but the LDP still maintained its firm majority in total votes. This was the first time since its inception that the LDP had garnered fewer votes than another party.

The 2005 snap parliamentary elections called by Junichiro Koizumi in response to the rejection of his Postal privatization bills saw a major setback to the DPJ's plans of obtaining a majority in the Diet. The DPJ leadership, particularly Okada, had staked their reputation on winning the election and driving the LDP from power. When the final results were in, the DPJ had lost 62 seats, mostly to its rival the LDP. Okada resigned the party leadership, fulfilling his campaign promise to do so if the DPJ did not obtain a majority in the Diet. He was replaced by Seiji Maehara in September 2005.

However, Maehara's term as party leader lasted barely half a year. Although he initially led the party's criticism of the Koizumi administration, particularly in regards to connections between LDP lawmakers and scandal-ridden Livedoor, the revelation that a fake email was used to try and establish this link greatly damaged his credibility. The scandal led to the resignation of Representative Hisayasu Nagata and of Maehara as party leader on 31 March. New elections for party leader were held on 7 April, in which Ichirō Ozawa was elected president. In the Upper House election 2007, the DPJ won 60 out of 121 contested seats, with 49 seats not up for re-election.

=== 2009–2012 government ===
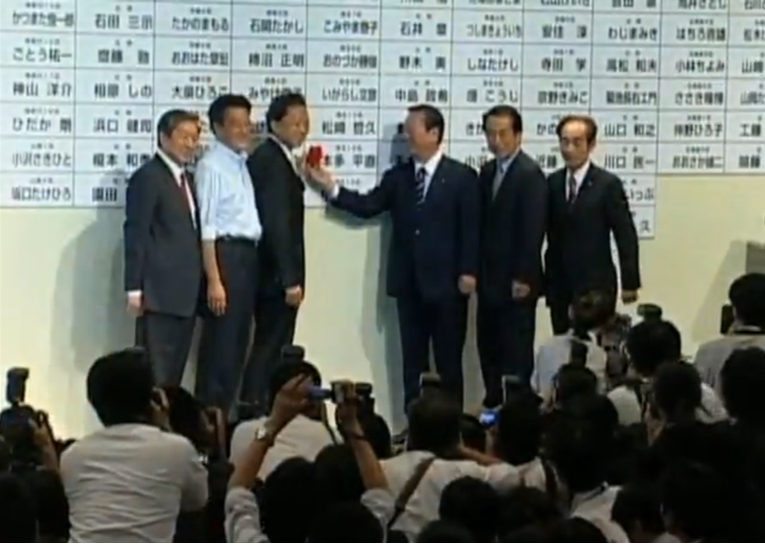
DPJ winning the 2009 general election

Ozawa resigned as party leader in May 2009 after a fundraising scandal and Yukio Hatoyama succeeded Ozawa before the August 2009 general election, at which the party swept the LDP from power in a massive landslide, winning 308 seats (out of a total of 480 seats), reducing the LDP from 300 to 119 seats – the worst defeat for a sitting government in modern Japanese history. This was in marked contrast to the closely contested 1993 general election, the only other time the LDP has lost an election. The DPJ's strong majority in the House of Representatives assured that Hatoyama would be the next prime minister to replace Tarō Asō, leader of the LDP. Hatoyama was nominated on September 16 and formally appointed later that day by Emperor Akihito in the Tokyo Imperial Palace and formed his Cabinet.

However, the DPJ did not have a majority in the House of Councillors, which was not contested at the election, and fell just short of the 320 seats (a two-thirds majority) needed to override the upper chamber's veto power. Hatoyama was thus forced to form a coalition government with the Social Democratic Party and the People's New Party to ensure their support in the House of Councillors.

On 2 June 2010, Hatoyama announced his resignation before a party meeting and officially resigned two days later. He cited breaking a campaign promise to close an American military base on the island of Okinawa Prefecture as the main reason for the move. On 28 May 2010, soon after and because of increased tensions after the possible sinking of a Korean ship by North Korea, Hatoyama had made a deal with U.S. President Barack Obama to retain the base for security reasons, but the deal was unpopular in Japan. He also mentioned money scandals involving a top party leader, Ozawa, who resigned as well, in his decision to step down. Hatoyama had been pressured to leave by members of his party after doing poorly in polls in anticipation of the July upper house election. Naoto Kan succeeded Hatoyama as the next president of DPJ and prime minister of Japan.

At the July 2010 House of Councillors election, the DPJ lost ten seats and their coalition majority. Prior to the election, Kan raised the issue of an increase to Japan's 5 per cent consumption tax in order to address the country's rising debt. This proposal, together with Ozawa and Hatoyama's scandals, was viewed as one of the causes for the party's poor performance in the election. The divided house meant the government required the cooperation of smaller parties including Your Party and the Communist Party to ensure the passage of legislation through the upper house.

Ozawa challenged Kan's leadership of the DPJ in September 2010. Although Ozawa initially had a slight edge among DPJ members of parliament, local rank-and-file party members and activists overwhelmingly supported Kan, and according to opinion polls the wider Japanese public preferred Kan to Ozawa by as much as a 4–1 ratio. In the final vote by DPJ lawmakers Kan won with 206 votes to Ozawa's 200.

After the leadership challenge, Kan reshuffled his cabinet and removed many prominent members of the pro-Ozawa faction from important posts in the new cabinet. The cabinet reshuffle also resulted in the promotion of long-time Kan ally Yoshito Sengoku to Chief Cabinet Secretary, who the LDP labeled as the "second" Prime Minister of the Kan cabinet.

In September 2010, the government intervened to weaken the surging yen by buying U.S. dollars, a move which temporarily relieved Japan's exporters. The move proved popular with stock brokers, Japanese exporters, and the Japanese public. It was the first such move by a Japanese government since 2004. Later, in October, after the yen had offset the intervention and had reached a 15-year high, the Kan cabinet approved a stimulus package worth about 5.1 trillion yen ($62 billion) in order to weaken the yen and fight deflation.

During its time in office, the DPJ was beset by internal conflicts and struggled to implement many of its proposed policies, an outcome described by political scientists Phillip Lipscy and Ethan Scheiner as the "paradox of political change without policy change". Legislative productivity under the DPJ was particularly low, falling to levels unprecedented in recent Japanese history according to some measures. However, the DPJ implemented a number of progressive measures during its time in office such as the provision of free public schooling through high school, increases in child-rearing subsidies, expanded unemployment insurance coverage, extended duration of a housing allowance, and stricter regulations safeguarding part-time and temporary workers.

=== 2012–2016 return to opposition and dissolution ===
On 24 February 2016, the DPJ announced an agreement to merge with the smaller Japan Innovation Party (JIP) and Vision of Reform ahead of the Upper House elections in the summer, with a merger at a special convention agreed for 27 March. On 4 March 2016, the DPJ and JIP asked supporters for suggestions for a name for the new party. On 14 March 2016 the name of the new party was announced as Minshintō, having been the most popular choice of possible names polled among voters. With the addition of Representatives form Vision of Reform, the DPJ and JIP merged to form the Democratic Party on 27 March 2016.

The dissolution of the DPJ is mainly attributed to the fact that the reforms that the DPJ advocated for were hard to put into place because of electoral restrictions, economic restrictions, and the fact that the reforms that would reduce the power of the bureaucracy would help deprive the DPJ of the power to implement their other reforms. Other factors that affected the dissolution of the party were the internal conflicts that paralyzed the DPJ and the fact that the DPJ aligned itself with the foreign policy of the LDP.

== Ideology ==
Inspirated by the Third Way of European social democratic parties, the Democratic Party of Japan (DPJ) declared itself a "democratic centre" (民主中道, minshu-chūdō). This was determined in the first party convention on 27 April 1998. The DPJ aimed become a third force in Japan's party system (on par with the LDP and the SDP), claiming to be a "liberal alternative" to the existing parties.

Ideologically, under the banner of liberalism, the DPJ pursued a comprehensive political agenda that included market-oriented and decentralization-oriented reforms, as well as a strong commitment to protecting and improving civil rights and human rights. The DPJ has been widely described as liberal, or social-liberal. According to a survey conducted by the Mainichi Shimbun targeting Diet members, the political opinions of the DPJ's members were positioned between those of the conservative LDP and the centre-left SDP, and their ideology and policies were liberal. Heenan points out that the DPJ, in which about half of the SDP members participated in its founding, was broadly progressive. On the other hand, the DPJ did not actively bring gender issues to the forefront of politics during its time in power, and even when it held a majority (2009–2011), it did not introduce a gender quota. While the left-liberal governments of Austria, the United Kingdom, and France abolished the death penalty in 1950, 1965, and 1981, respectively, the DPJ government in Japan neither abolished nor significantly reformed the death penalty. The DPJ adopted a more pragmatic and centrist approach than the Japan Socialist Party (JSP), maintained a centrist stance on issues such as tax cuts, public services, regulatory policy, decentralization, social policy, and environmental policy. The DPJ advocated a reform agenda centered on neoliberalism, complemented by a social-democratic approach to expanding social security and a multilateral or globalist orientation in foreign and security policy. The DPJ's neoliberal policies were supported by corporations, and its liberal policies were supported by citizens, however the party gradually shifted its policies from neoliberalism to welfarism. The DPJ proposed policies such as providing childcare allowances, direct support to individual farmers, and promoting the financial independence for local governments. In the 2009 general election, the DPJ campaigned on a manifesto opposing the LDP's developmental state and structural reforms, and established a Japanese government that implemented welfare policies for the first time since World War II.

The DPJ's economic policies advocated deregulation, attracting foreign investment, reducing wasteful public works spending, and shrinking the discretionary power of the national bureaucracy, which were closely linked to the party's decentralization policies. Advocating the principle of subsidiarity, the party argued that decision-making should not necessarily occur at the central government level, but rather at the appropriate level of government. The party also advocated for political initiative, calling for reforms to the governing structure through measures such as expanding the prime minister's powers, strengthening the cabinet's budget-making authority, and increasing the initiative of politicians within the bureaucracy. The DPJ was a coalition of politicians with diverse backgrounds, ranging from economic liberals to former socialists. According to Krauss and Pekkanen, some members of the DPJ may have held more economically liberal views than members of the LDP. Among those who led the party were Naoto Kan, who emphasized the need to increase spending on social services (pensions, health care, and nursing); Yukio Hatoyama, who prioritized employment adjustment and job creation; and Katsuya Okada, who stated, "Politics should not intervene in the market. The role of politics is to mitigate economic disparities arising from free competition."

According to one survey, the DPJ does not support the kind of nationalism seen in the LDP. For example, the mainstream view within the party is that Japan was the aggressor in the Pacific War. A 2005 survey revealed that the majority of DPJ's members of the House of Representatives argued that Japan's actions during the war were "mistakes" and generally opposed the prime minister's visits to Yasukuni Shrine. According to a 2014 survey, the most common response among the DPJ's lawmakers regarding the acceptance of migrant workers was "no opinion," accounting for just over 40%, while those in favor and those against each accounted for approximately 30%.

The DPJ is generally classified as a centrist party. In October 2003, the DPJ absorbed conservative groups such as the Liberal Party, transforming from the centre-left previous DPJ, established in 1996, into an ideologically centrist in the early 21st century. Between the LDP and the SDP, there was space for other parties to enter and grow, and the DPJ filled that space by shifting towards the centre. However, it is also classified as a centre-left. Furthermore, some influential figures within the party, including Ichirō Ozawa, hold positions almost identical to those of the LDP's rignt-wing. Therefore, according to Shinkawa and Onishi, it is not impossible to call this party "centre-right."

The DPJ aimed to create a platform broad enough to encompass the views of politicians who had roots in either the LDP or the JSP. Party leader Naoto Kan compared the DPJ to the Olive Tree alliance of former Italian prime minister Romano Prodi, and described his view that it needed to be "the party of Thatcher and Blair". The DPJ has often been designated as a big tent party, composed of leftists (socialists, social-democrats), liberal reformers, and conservatives. Within the DPJ, three different policy directions coexisted: neoliberalism, developmental state, and social democracy. The first "neoliberalism" opposed the developmental state, pork-barrel politics of the LDP, and bureaucrat-led politics, and was supported by many factions within the party. Among these, fiscal structural reform was considered the most important and became the driving force behind the DPJ administration. The second "developmental state" was a political approach adopted by the group led by Ozawa, which aimed to provide welfare programmes directly to each individual citizen. The third "social democracy" was promoted by former JSP members and citizen movement groups, and aimined to implement welfare policies similar to those found in European social democracy.

=== View of the status quo ===
The DPJ claimed themselves to be revolutionary in that they are against the status quo and the current governing establishment. The DPJ argued that the bureaucracy and the size of the Japanese government is too large, inefficient, and saturated with cronies and that the Japanese state is too conservative and inflexible. The DPJ wanted to "overthrow the ancient régime locked in old thinking and vested interests, solve the problems at hand, and create a new, flexible, affluent society which values people's individuality and vitality."

=== Political standpoint ===
We stand for those who have been excluded by the structure of vested interests, those who work hard and pay taxes, and for people who strive for independence despite difficult circumstances. In other words, we represent citizens, taxpayers, and consumers. We do not seek a panacea either in the free market or in the welfare state. Rather, we shall build a new road of the democratic center toward a society in which self-reliant individuals can mutually coexist and the government's role is limited to building the necessary systems.

=== Goals ===
The DPJ's "democratic centre" pursued the following five goals.

- Transparent, just and fair society

The Democratic Party sought to build a society governed with rules which are transparent, just and fair.

- Free market and inclusive society

While the party argued that the free market system should "permeate" economic life, they also aim for an inclusive society which guarantees security, safety, and fair and equal opportunity for each individual.

- Decentralized and participatory society

The party intended to devolve the centralized government powers to citizens, markets, and local governments so that people of all backgrounds can participate in decision-making.

- Compliance with the three constitutional principles

The Democratic Party proclaimed to hold the values in the meaning of the constitution to "embody the fundamental principles of the Constitution": popular sovereignty, respect for fundamental human rights, and pacifism.

- International relations based on self-reliance and mutual coexistence

As a member of the global community, the party sought to establish Japan's international relations in the fraternal spirit of self-reliance and mutual coexistence to restore the world's trust in the country.

=== Policy platforms ===
The DPJ's policy platforms included the restructuring of civil service, monthly allowance to a family with children (¥26,000 per child), cut in gas tax, income support for farmers, free tuition for public high schools, banning of temporary work in manufacturing, raising the minimum-wage to ¥1,000 and halting of increase in sales tax for the next four years.

The DPJ's stance on nuclear power was that steady steps should be taken towards nuclear power, but not too quickly as to possibly endanger safety.

== Structure ==
The Democratic Party of Japan was headed by a president (民主党代表, daihyō). The president appointed other members of the party executive. The president, secretary-general (幹事長, kanji-chō), and acting president (代表代行, daihyō daikō) were referred to as the "three top officials" and were considered the most important leaders of the party. An Executive Committee (執行部, shikkō-bu) was formed by these three offices in combination with the chairman in the House of Councillors. The secretary-general was responsible for managing the organisation of the party. The acting president was selected from among deputy presidents and acted on the president's behalf in some party affairs. The standing executive numbered approximately 30 people and consisted of the president, acting and deputy presidents, secretary-general, the respective chairpersons of the Policy Research Council, Election Strategy Committee, Diet Affairs Committee, and Organisation Committee, the party leadership in the House of Councillors, and other officials designated by the president. Prior to the establishment of the Next Cabinet, the party had a General Affairs Committee with a dedicated chairperson, but these were abolished in September 1999. During the Hatoyama government, the Policy Research Council and its chairperson was abolished in order to centralise policymaking within the government. They were reinstated by Naoto Kan in June 2010.

All residents of Japan over the age of 18 (limited to Japanese citizens only from September 2012) could apply for membership in the party. The annual membership fee was 6,000 yen. A lesser tier of membership were registered supporters, who paid a 2,000 yen annual fee and could attend party events and volunteer.

DPJ members over time
| 2004 | 110,000 |
| 2005 | 157,000 |
| 2006 | 244,000 |
| 2007 | 201,000 |
| 2008 | 269,000 |
| 2009 | 263,700 |
| 2010 | 342,493 |
| 2011 | 303,219 |
| 2012 | 326,974 |
| 2013 | 218,508 |
| 2014 | 232,757 |
| 2015 | 233,100 |

The party maintained branches in all 47 prefectures, known formally as Prefectural Branch Federations (県総支部連合会, ken sōshibu rengō-kai) and commonly shortened to kenren (県連). Each prefectural branch had its own president, typically drawn from the party's Diet members from that prefecture. Individual branches were organised at the constituency level and known as sōshibu (総支部). The party also organised administratively at the municipal level (行政区支部, gyōseiku shibu).

=== Electoral strategy ===
The "Next Cabinet" was created in October 1999 by Yukio Hatoyama, modeled after the shadow cabinet of the Westminster system. The Next Cabinet was the chief policymaking body of the party, composed of party members mirroring those of government ministers. The Next Cabinet collectively discussed and approved submissions from the Policy Research Council, and Next Ministers were responsible for policy in their designated area. The aim of the Next Cabinet system was to improve transparency and separate party management from policymaking, as the two had previously been combined in the General Affairs Committee. Inclusion in the Next Cabinet did not necessarily indicate that the president intended to appoint that person to the position if the party won government, or to cabinet at all: only six of 20 members of Hatoyama's final Next Cabinet were appointed to the Yukio Hatoyama cabinet. Each leader from 1999 onwards appointed a Next Cabinet and reshuffled it regularly, and the practice continued after the DPJ lost power in 2012.

The DPJ established a number of rules regarding candidate nominations for national elections over time. A series of new rules were established for the 2009 election. First-time candidates in single-member constituencies were required to be under 60 years of age. Candidates who had run twice without winning their constituency were barred from seeking election again, even if they had been elected via proportional representation. For former Diet members who had previously been defeated, the rules were more lenient; they could run up to the age of 64 and were permitted a third defeat being before barred from nomination. Candidates for proportional representation were capped at 70 years of age. Rules to discourage political dynasties were also implemented which prevented candidates from running in constituencies recently held by relatives or from hiring secretaries to whom they were closely related.

The party also experimented with different forms of candidate recruitment starting in 1999 in order to encourage more competitive and female candidates. In the "open recruitment" procecss, the party took applications from interested individuals. They were required to submit their qualifications, preferred electoral district, and a short essay explaining their interest in running. Promising candidates were interviewed by party staff and, if successful, were assigned an electoral district. They then met with relevant local party officials for final approval. This method was also subsequently adopted by the LDP. The number of first-time candidates drawn from open recruitment grew during the 2000s, peaking at 40% in the 2009 election. By the time of the 2012 election, the party had received over 5,200 applications and nominated a total of 79 candidates through the process. Open recruitment candidates had a higher success rate than traditionally-recruited candidates, winning 47% of their races compared to 30%.

=== List of presidents ===
The president was elected to a fixed term of two years, later extended to three starting from 2012. The term expired at the end of September and indefinite re-election was allowed. In regular elections, a mixed process involving the party's Diet members, grassroots members, and local government officials or prefectural branches was used. The exact method changed over time. In the event of a mid-term resignation, the election was conducted via vote of the party's Diet members alone. In 2014, the party amended its statutes to allow the mixed process to be used in the event of a mid-term resignation. In total, the party held 18 elections for president in its lifetime, of which nine were conducted via Diet vote, four were conducted via the mixed process, and five were uncontested. Of the uncontested races, four were regularly scheduled and would have involved the mixed process, and one would have involved a Diet vote.

| No. | President (birth–death) | Constituency | Took office | Left office | Election results | Prime Minister (term) |
|---|---|---|---|---|---|---|
Preceding parties: Democratic Party (1996), New Fraternity Party, Good Governance Party, & Democratic Reform Party
| 1 | Naoto Kan (b. 1946) | Rep for Tokyo 18th | 27 April 1998 | 25 September 1999 | 1998 Unopposed Jan. 1999 Naoto Kan – 180; Shigefumi Matsuzawa – 51; Abstention – 8 | Hashimoto 1996–98 |
| 1 | Naoto Kan (b. 1946) | Rep for Tokyo 18th | 27 April 1998 | 25 September 1999 | 1998 Unopposed Jan. 1999 Naoto Kan – 180; Shigefumi Matsuzawa – 51; Abstention – 8 | Obuchi 1998–2000 |
| 2 | Yukio Hatoyama (b. 1947) | Rep for Hokkaido 9th | 25 September 1999 | 10 December 2002 | Sep. 1999 1st round Yukio Hatoyama – 154; Naoto Kan – 109; Takahiro Yokomichi – 57 Sep. 1999 2nd round Yukio Hatoyama – 182; Naoto Kan – 130 2000 Unopposed walkover Sep. 2002 1st round Yukio Hatoyama – 294; Naoto Kan – 221; Yoshihiko Noda – 182; Takahiro Yokomichi – 119 Sep. 2002 2nd round Yukio Hatoyama – 254; Naoto Kan – 242 | Obuchi 1998–2000 |
| 2 | Yukio Hatoyama (b. 1947) | Rep for Hokkaido 9th | 25 September 1999 | 10 December 2002 | Sep. 1999 1st round Yukio Hatoyama – 154; Naoto Kan – 109; Takahiro Yokomichi – 57 Sep. 1999 2nd round Yukio Hatoyama – 182; Naoto Kan – 130 2000 Unopposed walkover Sep. 2002 1st round Yukio Hatoyama – 294; Naoto Kan – 221; Yoshihiko Noda – 182; Takahiro Yokomichi – 119 Sep. 2002 2nd round Yukio Hatoyama – 254; Naoto Kan – 242 | Mori 2000–01 |
| 2 | Yukio Hatoyama (b. 1947) | Rep for Hokkaido 9th | 25 September 1999 | 10 December 2002 | Sep. 1999 1st round Yukio Hatoyama – 154; Naoto Kan – 109; Takahiro Yokomichi – 57 Sep. 1999 2nd round Yukio Hatoyama – 182; Naoto Kan – 130 2000 Unopposed walkover Sep. 2002 1st round Yukio Hatoyama – 294; Naoto Kan – 221; Yoshihiko Noda – 182; Takahiro Yokomichi – 119 Sep. 2002 2nd round Yukio Hatoyama – 254; Naoto Kan – 242 | Koizumi 2001–06 |
| 3 | Naoto Kan (b. 1946) | Rep for Tokyo 18th | 10 December 2002 | 18 May 2004 | Dec. 2002 Naoto Kan – 104; Katsuya Okada – 79 | Koizumi 2001–06 |
| 4 | Katsuya Okada (b. 1953) | Rep for Mie 3rd | 18 May 2004 | 17 September 2005 | May. 2004 Unopposed Sep. 2004 Unopposed walkover | Koizumi 2001–06 |
| 5 | Seiji Maehara (b. 1962) | Rep for Kyoto 2nd | 17 September 2005 | 7 April 2006 | 2005 Seiji Maehara – 96; Naoto Kan – 94; Abstention – 3 | Koizumi 2001–06 |
| 6 | Ichirō Ozawa (b. 1942) | Rep for Iwate 4th | 7 April 2006 | 16 May 2009 | Apr. 2006 Ichirō Ozawa – 119; Naoto Kan – 73 Sep. 2006 Unopposed walkover 2008 Unopposed walkover | Koizumi 2001–06 |
| 6 | Ichirō Ozawa (b. 1942) | Rep for Iwate 4th | 7 April 2006 | 16 May 2009 | Apr. 2006 Ichirō Ozawa – 119; Naoto Kan – 73 Sep. 2006 Unopposed walkover 2008 Unopposed walkover | Abe S. 2006–07 |
| 6 | Ichirō Ozawa (b. 1942) | Rep for Iwate 4th | 7 April 2006 | 16 May 2009 | Apr. 2006 Ichirō Ozawa – 119; Naoto Kan – 73 Sep. 2006 Unopposed walkover 2008 Unopposed walkover | Fukuda Y. 2007–08 |
| 6 | Ichirō Ozawa (b. 1942) | Rep for Iwate 4th | 7 April 2006 | 16 May 2009 | Apr. 2006 Ichirō Ozawa – 119; Naoto Kan – 73 Sep. 2006 Unopposed walkover 2008 Unopposed walkover | Asō 2008–09 |
| 7 | Yukio Hatoyama (b. 1947) | Rep for Hokkaido 9th | 16 May 2009 | 4 June 2010 | 2009 Yukio Hatoyama – 124; Katsuya Okada – 95 | Asō 2008–09 |
| 7 | Yukio Hatoyama (b. 1947) | Rep for Hokkaido 9th | 16 May 2009 | 4 June 2010 | 2009 Yukio Hatoyama – 124; Katsuya Okada – 95 | Himself 2009–10 |
| 8 | Naoto Kan (b. 1946) | Rep for Tokyo 18th | 4 June 2010 | 29 August 2011 | Jun. 2010 Naoto Kan – 291; Shinji Tarutoko – 129 Sep. 2010 Naoto Kan – 721; Ichirō Ozawa – 491 | Himself 2010–11 |
| 9 | Yoshihiko Noda (b. 1957) | Rep for Chiba 4th | 29 August 2011 | 25 December 2012 | 2011 1st round Banri Kaieda – 143; Yoshihiko Noda – 102; Seiji Maehara – 74; Michihiko Kano – 52; Sumio Mabuchi −24 2011 2nd round Yoshihiko Noda – 215; Banri Kaieda – 177 Sep. 2012 Yoshihiko Noda – 818; Hirotaka Akamatsu – 154; Kazuhiro Haraguchi – 123; Michihiko Kano – 113 | Himself 2011–12 |
| 10 | Banri Kaieda (b. 1949) | Rep for Tokyo 1st | 25 December 2012 | 14 December 2014 | Dec. 2012 Banri Kaieda – 90; Sumio Mabuchi – 54 | Abe S. 2012–20 |
| 11 | Katsuya Okada (b. 1953) | Rep for Mie 3rd | 14 December 2014 | 27 March 2016 | 2015 1st round Goshi Hosono – 298; Katsuya Okada – 294; Akira Nagatsuma – 168 2015 2nd round Katsuya Okada – 133; Goshi Hosono – 120 | Abe S. 2012–20 |
Successor party: Democratic Party (2016)

== Factions ==
The DPJ was formed through a large and complex process as a coalition of multiple political groups. There were various factions within the party, ranging from conservatives to social-democrats, and disagreements were wide-ranging.

Factions were formed from the very start of the original 1996 Democratic Party, based on former affiliation, ideology, generational divides, and the personality of the leader. Former members of the Japan Socialist and Democratic Socialist parties quickly organised their own associations, which remained the most organised and institutionalised factions throughout the party's lifespan. Other groups existed on a less formal basis, typically surrounding individual leaders. These factions were less organised, were active less regularly, and often shared overlapping membership. Factional balance was nonetheless a notable factor in candidate nominations and personnel appointments. Support groups existing for Yukio Hatoyama and Naoto Kan were based on the right and left wings of the old Sakigake Party. Tsutomu Hata and Ichirō Ozawa also led associations of members from their own respective parties. From 2002, junior lawmakers organised groups around Yoshihiko Noda and Seiji Maehara. They frequently mobilised during leadership races, but the dynamics between them were complex, and often they did not uniformly support single candidates. When the party came to government in 2009, the Mainichi Shimbun reported that there were nine factions within the party which together accounted for around 300 of the party's 420 Diet members.

The activity of factions increased during the Kan government. The Ozawa and Hatoyama groups functioned as an internal opposition to Kan, who was supported by the Kan, Noda, and Maehara groups. These same groups formed the basis of support for the subsequent Noda government, while a large part of the Ozawa group eventually split from the party. In addition, many junior and middle-ranking Diet members began creating their own groups, particularly during the 2011 leadership contest. Most of these did not survive the crushing defeat at the December 2012 general election.

As in the Liberal Democratic Party, factions are commonly known by the name of their leader, but they also have official names. In Japanese, they are referred to as groups (グループ, gurūpu).

=== Formed before 2009 ===
| Common name | Official name | Period | Leader(s) | Description |
|---|---|---|---|---|
| Former DSP group/ Kawabata group/ Takaki group | Democratic Socialist Association | 1994– | Tatsuo Kawabata; Yoshiaki Takaki | Formed by former members of the Democratic Socialist Party and the New Fraternity Party, it also existed in the New Frontier and original Democratic parties. It had a robust support base comprised of right-leaning, private sector trade unions formerly associated with Dōmei. The group competed particularly in elections to the House of Councillors. Notable members included Kansei Nakano, Takashi Yonezawa, Jin Matsubara, and Masayuki Naoshima. The faction supported Yukio Hatoyama in the September 2002 leadership race and allowed a free vote in 2005, though a majority of members supposedly favoured Seiji Maehara. Kawabata became chairman in 2006 and supported Ichirō Ozawa in that year's leadership race. The faction allowed a free vote in the 2009 race and a majority of members supported Hatoyama, although Kawabata personally endorsed Katsuya Okada. After Hatoyama's resignation in June 2010, the group supported Naoto Kan. The faction considered fielding a candidate against Kan in September, but ultimately issued non-binding recommendation in favour of him against Ozawa. In 2011, a free vote was allowed, though Kawabata declared his personal support for Maehara. Kawabata and a number of other leaders were defeated in the 2012 general election, and Yoshiaki Takaki took over as chairman. The group supported Banri Kaieda for leader in the December 2012 race. The faction's supporting unions were divided between Katsuya Okada and Goshi Hosono in the 2015 race, resulting in a non-binding recommendation for Okada. The faction continued to exist in the 2016 Democratic Party and the Democratic Party For the People. |
| Former JSP group/Yokomichi group | New Political Situation Roundtable (Note: Previously Democracy Plus 21 until 2001) | 1996–2017 | Takahiro Yokomichi | Formed by former members of the Japan Socialist Party in the original Democratic Party and was considered the most left-wing section of the party. It maintained ties with the public sector unions formerly associated with Sōhyō, which formed its support base. Notable members included Azuma Koshiishi, Hirotaka Akamatsu, and Yoshio Hachiro. Initially an informal group, it was established as the New Political Situation Roundtable in December 2001 and took in left-wing members from a non-JSP background as well. The faction supported Naoto Kan for leader in 2005, Ozawa in 2006, Hatoyama in 2009, Kan again in June 2010. The faction was split between during the September 2010 race; Akamatsu and Koshiishi endorsed Ozawa while Hachiro was a key member of Kan's campaign. The faction allowed a free vote in 2011, with Akamatsu becoming campaign manager for Banri Kaieda. He also ran against Yoshihiko Noda in September 2012 and placed third. The faction was increasingly eclipsed by Akamatsu's group Sanctuary after 2012, which fully replaced it in the DPJ's successor parties after Yokomichi's retirement. |
| Hata group | Government Strategy Research Group | 1998–2012 | Tsutomu Hata | Formed by Tsutomu Hata and former members of the Good Governance Party in 1998, it was generally conservative. The faction suffered a split during the September 2002 race in which many younger lawmakers moved to the Noda and Maehara factions. Notable members after this point included Michihiko Kano, Kazuhiro Haraguchi, Hajime Ishii, and Toshimi Kitazawa. The group supported Ozawa in 2006. A free vote was allowed in 2009, but Hata himself endorsed Hatoyama. When faction member Shinji Tarutoko ran against Naoto Kan in June 2010, the faction opted for a free vote. In September, Hata endorsed Ozawa against Prime Minister Kan. A free vote was allowed again in 2011, but much of the faction supported Michihiko Kano and he subsequently founded his own group, taking many members with him. From this point the Hata group ceased to be significant within the party. The faction de facto ceased to exist after the 2012 election, in which Hata retired and many members were defeated. |
| Kan group | Research Group on the Shape of the Nation | 1999– | Naoto Kan | Formed by supporters of Naoto Kan after the September 1999 leadership race. It originally consisted mostly of left-leaning former members of the Japan New Party, New Party Sakigake, and Social Democratic Party. It expanded from 15 to 30 members at the 2000 election, and to 50 members by 2005, though it suffered losses at that year's election. Notable members included Satsuki Eda, Toshio Ogawa, Chinami Nishimura, and Akihisa Nagashima. After Kan's tenure as prime minister, the faction mostly supported Yoshihiko Noda in the 2011 leadership race and voted en masse against Banri Kaieda in the runoff. The group also backed Noda's re-election the following September. The faction suffered significantly in the 2012 general election but recovered some of its strength in 2014. The Kan group continued to exist in the 2016 Democratic Party and then the Constitutional Democratic Party. |
| Hatoyama group | Association for Realizing the Government's Campaign Promises (Note: Previously the Association for Realizing a Hatoyama Government (2002–03), Association of Comrades for Realizing a Democratic Party Government (2003), and Association for Realizing a Change of Government (2003–09)) | 2002–12 | Yukio Hatoyama | Formed in September 2002 by lawmakers supporting Yukio Hatoyama's re-election as party president. It consisted of right-leaning former members of the Japan New Party, New Party Sakigake, and New Frontier Party, and had overlapping membership with the Hata and Kawabata factions. Upon its founding, it was the largest faction in the party. It had relatively weak cohesion and members frequently joined and left, including Katsuya Okada. Notable members included Sakihito Ozawa, Banri Kaieda, Yoshiaki Takaki, and Yorihisa Matsuno. After Hatoyama's term as prime minister, he attempted to mediate between Kan and Ozawa during the September race, but ultimately sided with Ozawa. The faction did not unite behind him and subsequently suffered a number of defections, including Sakihito Ozawa, Hirofumi Hirano, and Shinji Tarutoko, who each founded their own minor factions. From this point, Hatoyama and his allies were hostile to the Kan government and formed the "non-mainstream" faction alongside Ozawa's group. Membership had declined to around 30 members by June 2011 from a high of 50. That month, he and Ozawa spearheaded an effort to pass a motion of no confidence against Kan, which was averted at the last minute following negotiations. Hatoyama ally Banri Kaieda ran for Prime Minister in the 2011 leadership race with the backing of the "non-mainstream" groups, but was defeated by Yoshihiko Noda. In 2012, Hatoyama and several of his allies were temporarily suspended from the party after voting against the bill to raise the consumption tax. He remained in the party after Ozawa split and put forward Kazuhiro Haraguchi to challenge Noda in the September leadership race, who placed a distant second. The faction was effectively dissolved with Hatoyama's retirement from the Diet in the December general election, which also saw the defeat of most of its members. |
| Noda group | Kaseikai (Note: Previously the Association of Patriots (Shishiku no kai) until 2006) | 2002– | Yoshihiko Noda | Formed by supporters of Yoshihiko Noda during the September 2002 leadership race, based on a former association of Matsushita Institute graduates. The group was neoconservative in outlook and shared many positions with the Maehara group, which it remained close to throughout the party's life. Notable members included Osamu Fujimura, who was the official chairman, as well as Shigefumi Matsuzawa, Sumio Mabuchi, Kōichirō Genba, and Renhō. The faction supported Okada for leader in 2004 and Maehara in 2005. Noda seriously considered challenging Ichirō Ozawa in the 2008 leadership contest, but faced significant opposition from the faction and ultimately withdrew. The Noda and Maehara groups unsuccessfully supported Okada for leader against Hatoyama in 2009. The group was marginalised after the party's election victory, with no members appointed to cabinet; Noda became vice-minister for finance. They entered the "mainstream" party leadership after supporting Kan in 2010, with Noda appointed finance minister and Renhō minister for administration. The faction supported Kan's re-election in September. The Noda and Maehara groups negotiated for a joint candidate in the August 2011 race, but both men ultimately ran. With crucial support from most of the Kan faction, Noda made the runoff against Banri Kaieda and won with the backing of his own group and those of Kan, Maehara, and Michihiko Kano. After the government's defeat in the 2012 election, the Noda group supported Sumio Mabuchi for leader. In the 2015 leadership race, Renhō initially intended to run, but the faction favoured Okada and she was unable to gather enough support to stand. Okada appointed her as acting president after his victory. The Noda group continued to exist in the 2016 Democratic Party and then the Constitutional Democratic Party. |
| Maehara group | Ryōunkai | 2002–2020 | Seiji Maehara | Formed by junior Diet members after the September 2002 leadership race. It drew from the former Japan New Party, New Party Sakigake, and newly elected members. The group took a hawkish foreign policy stance on China and generally liberal economic positions. It had significant policy and membership overlap with the Noda group, and the two factions were close throughout the party's existence. Notable members included Yoshito Sengoku, Yukio Edano, Junya Ogawa, Goshi Hosono, Jun Azumi, and Kenta Izumi. The group supported Katsuya Okada in the 2004 leadership contest and assisted in Maehara's victory in 2005. The group was marginalised during Ozawa's leadership from 2006–09. Maehara publicly called for a challenger to run in the 2008 leadership race, though he refrained from putting anyone forward. He and his allies were among the earliest to call for Ozawa's resignation in 2009. The faction entered the "mainstream" leadership after backing Naoto Kan for Prime Minister in June 2010, with Maehara becoming foreign minister, Edano party secretary-general, and Sengoku Chief Cabinet Secretary. The group supported Kan's re-election in September, with the notable exception of Hosono, who endorsed Ozawa and later left the group. The group reached the peak of its influence during this time, with Maehara group members holding key positions and leading factional conflict against the "non-mainstream" Ozawa and Hatoyama groups. Faction activities also increased with weekly meetings taking place. Maehara ran for Prime Minister in August 2011 after Kan's resignation. Although the most popular candidate among voters, he struggled to gain support in the Diet caucus, and ultimately placed third behind Kaieda and Noda. He backed Noda in the runoff and subsequently supported his government, endorsing him in the September 2012 race. The group lost about half its members in the 2012 election, including Sengoku and Yoko Komiyama, and was left with 20. They allowed a free vote in the December leadership contest. In the 2015 leadership race, the group was split between Okada and Hosono. The Maehara group continued to exist in the 2016 Democratic Party and first Democratic Party For the People. |
| Ozawa group | Isshinkai & Hokushinkai Club (Note: Restructured as the New Policy Study Group in 2011) | 2003–12 | Ichirō Ozawa | The Ozawa faction was initially a loose association of former members of the Liberal Party formed after the 2003 merger. Ozawa founded a study group called Isshinkai in 2004 targeted at first or second term Diet members. This was later supplemented by the Hokushinkai Club of new and defeated members after 2005 election. The faction expanded during Ozawa's tenure as party president, with the 2007 upper house and 2009 general elections resulting in an influx of members, known colloquially as "Ozawa children". After 2009 it became the largest faction in the party with between 120 and 150 members. The faction was influential during the Hatoyama government, but relegated to the "non-mainstream" under Naoto Kan, who appointed anti-Ozawa members to key roles. Ozawa unsuccessfully challenged Kan in September 2010. He strongly opposed any efforts to diverge from the party's 2009 election manifesto and particularly opposed any increase in the consumption tax. After his defeat, the faction suffered defections to other newly-founded groups, including those of Sakihito Ozawa, Tarutoko, Haraguchi, and others. In June 2011, he and Hatoyama spearheaded an effort to pass a motion of no confidence against Kan, which was averted at the last minute following negotiations. Following Kan's resignation, Ozawa unsuccessfully backed Banri Kaieda in the 2011 leadership race; his defeat was attributed in part to strong hostility to Ozawa throughout the party. Ozawa remained leader of the "non-mainstream" camp under new prime minister Noda. In December 2011, several faction members left the party and formed the Kizuna Party. Ozawa group members formed the bulk of the 57 Diet members who rebelled against the party line to vote against the consumption tax hike in July 2012; Ozawa and 48 others subsequently left the DPJ to found People's Life First. While a number of members remained in the DPJ, the faction is considered to have dissolved with the departure of Ozawa. |
| Kondo group | Liberal Association | 2004–16 | Shoichi Kondo | Formed in 2004 as an association of liberal, pro-Article 9 Diet members. At its formation it had 53 members, but declined due to lack of organisation and failure to field leadership candidates, and quickly became a minor faction. From 2005, Kondo and Hideo Hiraoka served as co-chairmen. Throughout its tenure the faction pressured the party to oppose military expansion and involvement in foreign conflicts. The group allowed a free vote in the 2009 leadership race and supported Kan in June 2010. A majority of members backed him again in September, including Kondo and Hiraoka, but a minority supported Ozawa, resulting in a free vote. Hiraoka considered running in the 2011 race but was unable to gather enough support. Haroka was critical of the Noda government and endorsed Hirotaka Akamatsu in the September 2012 contest. Member Takashi Shinohara considered running for leader in 2015, but withdrew to support Akira Nagatsuma, for whom Kondo served as campaign manager. Many of its members later joined the Constitutional Democratic Party; Kondo later became chairman of the Sanctuary faction in that party. |

=== Formed after 2009 ===
| Common name | Official name | Period | Leader(s) | Description |
|---|---|---|---|---|
| Sakihito Ozawa group | 21st Century National Vision Research Group | 2010–12 | Sakihito Ozawa | Founded in June 2010 by Sakihito Ozawa after Yukio Hatoyama's resignation as prime minister, along with several members who were part of the Hatoyama group. Notable members included Makiko Kikuta, Yuichiro Hata, and Fumihiko Igarashi. The group reportedly had around 45 members, though only 15 attended the opening of a faction office in April 2011. Ozawa attempted to run for Prime Minister in 2011, but was unable to gather enough support to be put on the ballot and instead endorsed Banri Kaieda. The group dissolved in November 2012 after Ozawa and several allies left the DPJ to join the Japan Restoration Party. |
| Tarutoko group | Seizankai | 2010–12 | Shinji Tarutoko | Formed in October 2010 by members who had supported Shinju Tarutoko in the June leadership contest. Members included Takeaki Matsumoto, Yorihisa Matsuno, and Hirofumi Ryu. It drew much of its membership from the Ozawa faction. Tarutoko stated he wanted to run for prime minister again in the August 2011 race, but withdrew to assist efforts to unite the Noda and Maehara camps. He attempted to convince his members to vote for Noda, but they remained divided and ultimately issued a free vote. It endorsed Noda in the September 2012 contest, after which Tarutoko was appointed minister for communications. The faction ceased to function after the December 2012 general election when almost all of its members, including Tarutoko, were defeated. |
| Hirano group | Yushikai | 2010–12 | Hirofumi Hirano | Formed in December 2010 by Hirofumi Hirano, who served as Chief Cabinet Secretary under Yukio Hatoyama. It drew much of its membership from first-term lawmakers from the Ozawa faction.< It was reportedly created in collaboration with Hatoyama to counter the influence of Hirano's group, which was drawing members away. Notable members included Jin Matsubara and Soichiro Okuno. Hirano attended an information session for prospective candidate in the August 2011 leadership race, but did not run. Four members of the group left the DPJ in late 2011 to form the Kizuna Party. Many junior members voted against the consumption tax hike in 2012 and later departed the party. The group dissolved after the December general election when all members except Matsubara and Okuno were defeated, including Hirano. |
| Haraguchi group | Japan Restoration · V-democrats | 2011–12 | Kazuhiro Haraguchi | Formed in February 2011 by allies of Kazuhiro Haraguchi. Many of its members were from the Ozawa group. It was considered part of the "non-mainstream" tendency hostile to the Kan government, and Haraguchi threatened to vote in favour of a motion of no confidence in June 2011, though he ultimately did not. In June 2012, he defied the party line to abstain on the consumption tax hike bill and received a warning from the party as a result. Haraguchi challenged Noda in the September 2012 leadership race and placed second. The faction was dissolved with the defeat of most of its members in the 2012 election. |
| Genba group | "Japan Grand Design" Study Group | 2011–17 | Kōichirō Genba | Formed in March 2011 by allies of Kōichirō Genba. Its inaugural meeting was attended by 35 Diet members. Notable members included Tsuyoshi Yamaguchi, Tatsuo Hirano, and Hiroshi Ogushi. It was rumoured that the group was intended to support a bid for Prime Minister by Genba in the 2011 leadership contest, but he ultimately did not run. Genba was appointed foreign minister in the Noda cabinet. Group activity ceased for two months following the leadership contest, but started up again in November. The group survived the loss of many members in the 2012 election, but continued declining in the following years. Tatsuo Hirano was expelled in 2013 and other members left to join the Hosono faction in 2014. After recovering some members in the 2014 election, the group numbered around ten. They supported Katsuya Okada for leader in 2015 and Genba was subsequently appointed chairman of the party's election strategy committee. The faction continued to exist in the 2016 Democratic Party and dissolved during the 2017 general election. |
| Kano group/ Ohata group | Sokōkai | 2011–18 | Michihiko Kano; Akihiro Ohata; Atsushi Oshima | Formed in August 2011 by members who had supported Michihiko Kano's bid for prime minister. It consisted mostly of mid-ranking Diet members and those affiliated with the agriculture or fishing industry, as well as members from the Kan and Ozawa groups. Members included Akihiro Ohata, Takashi Shinohara, Atsushi Oshima, and Takeshi Maeda. In 2012, controversy over alleged corruption in the agriculture ministry resulted in Kano, Maeda, and Nobutaka Tsutsui being removed from cabinet. The group supported Goshi Hosono in the September 2012 leadership race, but when he withdrew, Kano stood again and placed fourth. Noda subsequently appointed him deputy president of the party in a show of unity. Kano was defeated in the 2012 general election but the faction survived, with Ohata becoming the new chairman. The faction supported Kaieda in the December leadership contest. Under him, Ohata was appointed acting president and later secretary-general of the party. Ahead of the 2015 race, there was support for Takashi Shinohara within the group; after he withdrew, they supported Akira Nagatsuma for leader and Hosono in the runoff. In August of that year, Ohata resigned as chairman and was succeeded by Atsushi Oshima, becoming known as the "former Ohata group". The group continued to exist in the 2016 Democratic Party and was dissolved in March 2018. |
| Sanctuary | Sanctuary | 2012– | Hirotaka Akamatsu | Originally founded in 1996 by Akamatsu as a study group for former JSP members who had been defeated in the 1996 election. Akamatsu was active as a member of the Yokomichi group until his September 2012 leadership bid, after which time Sanctuary became politically active. It was positioned on the left-wing of the party much as the Yokomichi faction had been. At this time it had 40 members, reduced to 20 after the December election. Afterwards, Sanctuary fully eclipsed the Yokomichi faction and became known as the new "ex-JSP faction". Notable members included Seiji Osaka, Banri Kaieda, Azuma Koshiishi, and Ryu Matsumoto. The faction supported Kaieda for party president after the election. It supported Akira Nagatsuma for leader in 2015 and backed Okada in the runoff, delivering him victory. Sanctuary continued to exist in the 2016 Democratic Party and then the Constitutional Democratic Party. |
| Hosono group | Jiseikai (Note: Previously the Basic Policy Study Group until 2014) | 2012–25 | Goshi Hosono | Formed as a study group in October 2012 by Goshi Hosono and a number of junior and mid-ranking conservative Diet members. There had been a strong movement for Hosono to challenge Noda in the September leadership race, and though he had ultimately not run, he was viewed as a future leader. It initially comprised twelve members including Junya Ogawa, Keisuke Tsumura, Takeshi Shina, and Kenta Izumi. The group fared well in the December general election and lost only a small number of members. They allowed a free vote in that month's leadership race, but Hosono personally endorsed Banri Kaieda and was appointed party secretary-general thereafter. In October 2013 the group shifted its regular meetings to the same time as the Maehara group, which was viewed as a challenge to Hosono's former faction and discouraging dual membership. The group was officially registered in January 2014 as the Jiseikai and became an institutional faction, raising and distributing campaign funds, and prohibiting membership in other factions. Hosono ran for party president in 2015 but lost to Katsuya Okada. The faction continued its activities, holding a fundraising event in February which was attended by 1,500 people and raised 46 million yen. The group continued to exist in the 2016 Democratic Party, and in a weakened form in Kibō no Tō, the first Democratic Party For the People, and the Constitutional Democratic Party. It dissolved in 2025. |
| Nagashima group | National Axis Association | 2014–17 | Akihisa Nagashima | A conservative group founded in 2014 and led by Akihisa Nagashima, though he had been organising meetings of conservative members as early as 2010. Members included Eiichiro Washio, Shuji Kira, and Keiro Kitagami. Nagashima strongly encouraged Goshi Hosono to run in the 2015 leadership race and the faction also supported him. In August of that year, they held a joint study group concerning security legislation with the Gosono group and Sumio Mabuchi. The group continued to exist in the 2016 Democratic Party but dissolved in 2017, with most of its members joining Kibō no Tō. |

=== Estimates of strength ===
| Date | Total | Ozawa | Hatoyama | Kan | Maehara | Noda | Ex-DSP | Yokomichi | Hata | Kano/Ohata | Akamatsu | Hosono | Nagashima | Genba |
|---|---|---|---|---|---|---|---|---|---|---|---|---|---|---|
| May 2009 | 221 | ~50 | ~30 | ~20-30 | ~20 | ~20 | ~25 | ~20 | ~15 | | | | | |
| Sep 2009 | 420 | ~120-150 | ~45 | ~30-40 | ~30 | ~30 | ~20-30 | ~25-30 | ~20 | | | | | |
| Jun 2010 | 423 | ~120 | ~50 | ~60 | ~30 | ~30 | ~40 | ~30 | | | | | | |
| Sep 2010 | 411 | ~130 | ~50 | ~50 | ~30 | ~30 | ~40 | ~30 | | | | | | |
| Aug 2011 | 398 | ~130 | ~40 | ~50 | ~50 | ~30 | ~40 | ~30 | | | | | | |
| Sep 2012 | 336 | ~30 | ~10 | ~30 | ~40 | ~20 | ~30 | ~30 | | ~30 | | | | |
| Dec 2012 | 145 | | | ~15 | ~20 | ~10 | ~15 | ~15 | | ~10 | ~20 | ~10 | | |
| Jan 2015 | 132 | | | | ~20 | ~10 | ~15 | | | ~15 | ~15 | 14 | 7 | ~10 |

== Election results ==
=== General election results ===
House of Representatives
| Election | Leader | No. of candidates | Seats | | | Position | Constituency votes | | PR Block votes | | Status |
| Election | Leader | No. of candidates | No. | ± | Share | Position | No. | Share | No. | Share | Status |
|---|---|---|---|---|---|---|---|---|---|---|---|
| 2000 | Yukio Hatoyama | 262 | 127 / 480 | | 26.4% | 2nd | 16,811,732 | 27.61% | 15,067,990 | 25.18% | Opposition |
| 2003 | Naoto Kan | 277 | 177 / 480 | ▲50 | 36.8% | 2nd | 21,814,154 | 36.66% | 22,095,636 | 37.39% | Opposition |
| 2005 | Katsuya Okada | 299 | 113 / 480 | ▼64 | 23.5% | 2nd | 24,804,786 | 36.44% | 21,036,425 | 31.02% | Opposition |
| 2009 | Yukio Hatoyama | 330 | 308 / 480 | ▲195 | 64.1% | ▲1st | 33,475,334 | 47.43% | 29,844,799 | 42.41% | DPJ-PNP-SDP coalition (until 2010) |
| 2009 | Yukio Hatoyama | 330 | 308 / 480 | ▲195 | 64.1% | ▲1st | 33,475,334 | 47.43% | 29,844,799 | 42.41% | DPJ-PNP coalition (after 2010) |
| 2012 | Yoshihiko Noda | 267 | 57 / 480 | ▼251 | 11.8% | ▼2nd | 13,598,773 | 22.81% | 9,628,653 | 16.00% | Opposition |
| 2014 | Banri Kaieda | 198 | 73 / 475 | ▲16 | 15.3% | 2nd | 11,916,849 | 22.51% | 9,775,991 | 18.33% | Opposition |

=== Councillors election results ===
| Election | Leader | # of seats total | # of seats won | # of National votes | % of National vote | # of Prefectural votes | % of Prefectural vote | Majority/Minority |
|---|---|---|---|---|---|---|---|---|
| 1998 | Naoto Kan | 47 / 252 | 27 / 126 | 12,209,685 | 21.75% | 9,063,939 | 16.20% | Minority |
| 2001 | Yukio Hatoyama | 59 / 247 | 26 / 121 | 8,990,524 | 16.42% | 10,066,552 | 18.53% | Minority |
| 2004 | Katsuya Okada | 82 / 242 | 50 / 121 | 21,137,457 | 37.79% | 21,931,984 | 39.09% | Minority |
| 2007 | Ichirō Ozawa | 109 / 242 | 60 / 121 | 23,256,247 | 39.48% | 24,006,817 | 40.45% | Non-governing plurality (until 2009) |
| 2007 | Ichirō Ozawa | 109 / 242 | 60 / 121 | 23,256,247 | 39.48% | 24,006,817 | 40.45% | DPJ–SDP–PNP governing minority (since 2009) |
| 2010 | Naoto Kan | 106 / 242 | 44 / 121 | 18,450,139 | 31.56% | 22,756,000 | 38.97% | DPJ–PNP governing minority (until 2012) |
| 2010 | Naoto Kan | 106 / 242 | 44 / 121 | 18,450,139 | 31.56% | 22,756,000 | 38.97% | Non-governing plurality (since 2012) |
| 2013 | Banri Kaieda | 59 / 242 | 17 / 121 | 7,268,653 | 13.4% | 8,646,371 | 16.3% | Minority |

== See also ==
- Category:Democratic Party of Japan politicians
- Politics of Japan
  - List of political parties in Japan
  - Timeline of liberal parties in Japan
    - Democratic Socialist Party (Japan)
    - Social Democratic Party (Japan)
    - Good Governance Party
    - Democratic Party of Japan (1996)
    - Democratic Reform Party
    - New Fraternity Party
- Marutei Tsurunen: Japan's first deputy of European origin
