= Masamitsu Naito =

Japanese politician

- 内藤 正光
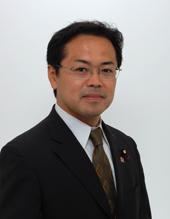

Member of the House of Councillors
- In office 26 July 1998 – 25 July 2010
- Constituency: National PR

Personal details
- Born: 29 January 1964 (age 62) Okazaki, Aichi, Japan
- Party: Democratic
- Education: University of Tokyo; Columbia University

Masamitsu Naito (内藤 正光, Naitō Masamitsu; born January 29, 1964) is a Japanese politician of the Democratic Party of Japan, a member of the House of Councillors in the Diet (national legislature). A native of Okazaki, Aichi, he graduated from the University of Tokyo and received master's degrees from it and Columbia University, he was elected to the House of Councillors for the first time in 1998 after running unsuccessfully for the Tokyo Metropolitan Assembly.

In November 2017 an investigation conducted by the International Consortium of Investigative Journalism cited his name in the list of politicians named in "Paradise Papers" allegations.
