= Mie 3rd district =

Legislative district of Japan

Mie 3rd District
- Parliamentary constituency for the Japanese House of Representatives
- Numbered map of Mie Prefecture single-member districts
- Prefecture: Mie
- Proportional District: Tōkai
- Electorate: 410,467 (September 2024)

Current constituency
- Created: 1994
- Seats: One
- Party: LDP
- Representative: Masataka Ishihara

Mie 3rd district (三重県第3区, Mie-ken dai-san-ku or simply 三重3区, Mie-san-ku) is a single-member constituency of the House of Representatives in the Diet of Japan. It covers Northern parts of Mie Prefecture. In 2012, 339,451 eligible voters were registered in the district.

The only representative for the 3rd district since its creation has been Katsuya Okada who had represented the pre-reform Mie 1st district that had elected five representatives by single non-transferable vote and covered roughly the present single-member districts Mie 1, 2 and 3. Okada was the president of the DPJ from 2004 to 2005.

== Area ==
- Yokkaichi (partly)
- Inabe
- Kuwana
- Tōin Town
- Kisosaki Town
- Mie District

== List of representatives ==
Representative	Party	Dates	Notes
Katsuya Okada	NFP	1996–1997	Joined Michihiko Kano's Kokumin no Koe ("Voice of the People") after the dissolution of the NFP (NFP→Kokumin no Koe→Minseitō→DPJ)
Katsuya Okada	DPJ	1997–2016	
Katsuya Okada	DP	2016–2017	
Katsuya Okada	Ind.	2017–2020	
Katsuya Okada	CDP	2020–2026	
Masataka Ishihara	LDP	2026-	

== Election results ==
2026
Party	Candidate	Votes	%	±%
LDP	Masataka Ishihara	99,392	42.11	▲17.12
Centrist Reform	Katsuya Okada	90,701	38.42	▼22.46
Sanseitō	Megumi Shintani	22,702	9.62	
CPJ	Masashi Itō	16,907	7.16	
JCP	Tamiko Kinugasa	6,345	2.69	
Registered electors		406,846		
Turnout		236,047	58.80	▲2.16
LDP gain from Centrist Reform				

2024
Party	Candidate	Votes	%	±%
CDP	Katsuya Okada	137,953	60.9	▼3.2
LDP	Masataka Ishihara	56,630	25.0	▼10.9
Ishin	Masashi Itō	31,988	14.1	
Registered electors		409,266		
Turnout			56.64	▲1.33
CDP hold				

2021
Party	Candidate	Votes	%	±%
CDP	Katsuya Okada	144,688	64.1	▼0.2
LDP	Masataka Ishihara (won a seat in Tōkai PR block)	81,209	35.9	▲8.2
Turnout			55.31	▼0.72
CDP hold				

2017
Party	Candidate	Votes	%	±%
Democratic	Katsuya Okada	147,255	64.3	+0.3
LDP	Yoshikazu Shimada	63,406	27.7	−0.7
JCP	Masahiro Nomura	11,864	5.3	−2.3
HRP	Maki Sakamoto	6,354	2.8	new

2014
Party	Candidate	Votes	%	±%
DPJ	Katsuya Okada	120,950	64.0	-0.1
LDP	Kōji Shimada	53,659	28.4	new
JCP	Toshiyuki Kamai	14,293	7.6	−0.5

2012
Party	Candidate	Votes	%	±%
DPJ	Katsuya Okada	126,679	64.1	
LDP	Hiroshi Sakurai (won proportional seat)	54,903	27.8	
JCP	Toshiyuki Kamai	16,009	8.1	

2009
Party	Candidate	Votes	%	±%
DPJ (PNP support)	Katsuya Okada	173,931	72.2	
LDP (Kōmeitō support)	Kōichi Hirata	62,993	26.1	
HRP	Noriko Nohara	3,968	1.6	
Turnout		244,439	73.08	

2005
Party	Candidate	Votes	%	±%
DPJ	Katsuya Okada	140,954	60.1	
LDP	Kōichi Hirata (elected by PR)	81,719	34.8	
JCP	Ritsuko Hoshino	11,895	5.1	
Turnout		237,207	72.63	

2003
Party	Candidate	Votes	%	±%
DPJ	Katsuya Okada	132,109	62.5	
LDP	Kōichi Hirata (elected by PR)	67,247	31.8	
JCP	Ritsuko Hoshino	13,562	5.6	
Turnout		216,280	67.1	

2000
Party	Candidate	Votes	%	±%
DPJ	Katsuya Okada	117,868	54.2	
LDP	Kōichi Hirata	82,222	37.8	
JCP	Ritsuko Hoshino	17,547	8.1	

1996
Party	Candidate	Votes	%	±%
NFP	Katsuya Okada	108,690	57.9	
LDP	Kazuya Kaneko	58,507	31.1	
JCP	Taneko Nishio	20,657	11.0	
Turnout		192,419	63.2	
