= 1955 System =

Japanese dominant party system since 1955

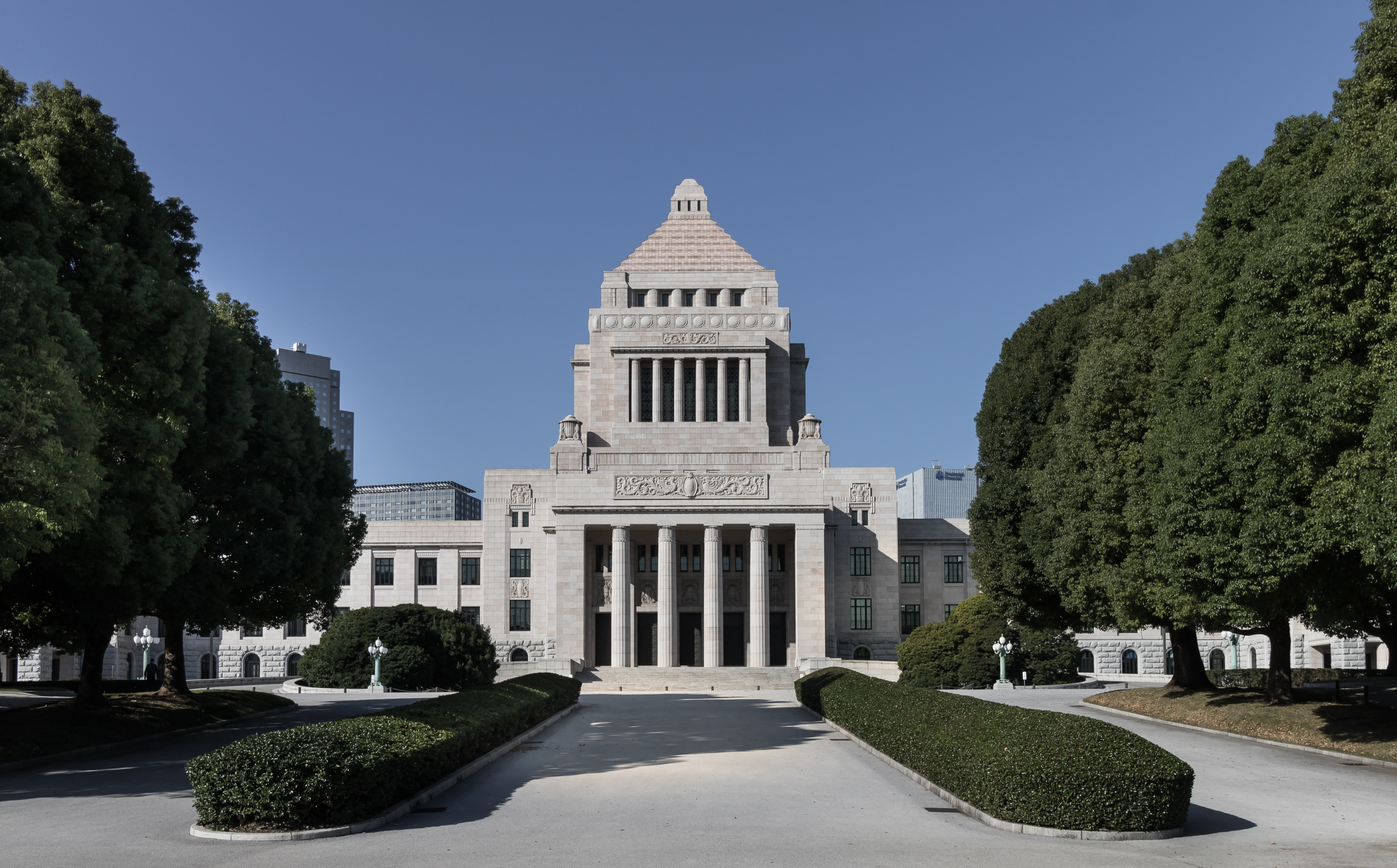
The National Diet Building

The 1955 system (Japanese: 55年体制, Hepburn: 55-nen Taisei), also known as the one-and-a-half party system, is a term used by scholars to describe the dominant-party system that has existed in Japan since 1955, in which the Liberal Democratic Party (LDP) has held by itself or in coalition with Komeito (from 1999 to 2025) a government nearly uninterrupted, with opposition parties largely incapable of forming significant or long lasting alternatives, other than for brief stints in 1993–1994 and 2009–2012. The terms 1955 system and the one-and-a-half party system are credited to Junnosuke Masumi, who described the 1955 system as "a grand political dam into which the history of Japanese politics surge".

The years of Japan under the 1955 regime witnessed high economic growth, leading to the dominance of the ruling party in the Diet, with an undergirded tight connection between the bureaucracy and the business sector. Due to a series of LDP scandals and the 1992 burst of the Japanese asset price bubble, the LDP lost its majority in the House of Representatives in the 1993 general election, which initially signalled the end of the 1955 system. However, the left-wing Japan Socialist Party, the long-time opposition which finally gained a majority, would soon lose much of its support after it decided to form a coalition government with the arch-rival LDP just a year later, leading to the JSP being refounded as the SDP in 1996, and its coalition partner regaining power. The LDP briefly lost power again in 2009 to the now defunct Democratic Party of Japan before regaining it in 2012, retaining power up to the present day. Nevertheless, it lost its majority in the House of Representatives in the 2024 general election, and its majority in the House of Councillors in the 2025 election, forcing it to run a minority government for the first time. The LDP regained its dominant status by securing a supermajority in the 2026 general election.

In the modern day, Japanese politics often take form of a 1955-like system; although the formation of third parties and poles of opposition may be more frequent. Examples include Nippon Ishin no Kai, the Japan Restoration Party, and Kibō no Tō. These parties often take up a more ambivalent stance to the LDP, agreeing to cooperate on some policies. Numerous small groups also fade in and out of the system. The current main opposition to the LDP is the Constitutional Democratic Party of Japan, a re-foundation of the 2017 party which came from liberal Democratic Party splinters.

== Background ==
=== Pre-1955 multiparty system ===
House of Representatives seat distribution in 1947

After World War II, Japan was controlled by the Supreme Commander for the Allied Powers (SCAP), which aimed at the eradication of militarism and the promotion of democratization in Japan. SCAP therefore issued a series of policies to arrest suspected war criminals which shuffled the political power in Japan. The power of right-wing parties declined in the immediate post war periods due to the purge. The Japan Progressive Party lost about 90% of the seats in the purge, while the Japan Liberal Party lost about 45%. Meanwhile, since many parties on the left were only legalized under the command of SCAP after the WW2, they were barely influenced by the purge. As a result, the Japan Socialist Party led by Tetsu Katayama won the first general election (1947) after the enforcement of the constitution of Japan.

Although at the time no formal regulations about how to form a coalition government existed, there was a consensus among the major parties that a coalition government should be formed to manage the post-war economic problems. Nonetheless, which parties would be included in the coalition took a long process of negotiations. Both a four-party coalition excluding the Japanese Communist Party (JCP) and a three-party coalition excluding both the JCP and the Liberal Party were suggested within the socialists. The Liberal party, led by anticommunist Shigeru Yoshida, showed great reluctance of joining the coalition. At a meeting between Katayama and Yoshida on May 19, 1947, the Liberal Party asked Katayama to "break off with the leftists" in return for its participation in the coalition. Since the Socialist Party had already claimed to officially cut ties with the Communist Party earlier, it refused such demand. The lengthy coalition-building process ended up with a government headed by the Socialist Party, the Democratic Party, and the National Cooperative Party.

The Katayama-led coalition government did not last more than a year due to opposition from both inside the Socialist Party and outside. In order to form a coalition, Katayama had to make concessions which departed from original policy proposals, which further facilitated the split between the leftist faction and the rightist faction within the party. At the same time, policies which Katayama did implement, such as nationalization of coal and mine production, drove the conservatives away.

=== Yoshida hegemony ===
House of Representatives seat distribution in 1949

After the failure of Katayama cabinet, voters lost confidence in the Socialist Party, which led to the takeover of government by Shigeru Yoshida. In the general election of 1949, the Democratic Liberal Party led by Yoshida won a majority in the House of representatives with 269 seats out of 466 seats, while the Socialist Party won only 48 seats. This was the first majority cabinet in post-war Japan.

Yoshida Shigeru organized five cabinets as a prime minister between 1946 and 1954. The diplomatic, economic, and security policies which Yoshida adopted when he was in power were altogether referred as the "Yoshida Doctrine". These policies remained influential even after him being voted out of the office by a no-confidence motion by the "Yoshida students" who followed his ideology.

The Yoshida Doctrine has three major components:

1. Japan relies on its alliance with the U.S. for national security.
2. Japan preserves a low level of self-defense capacity.
3. Japan should concentrate on the reconstruction of domestic economy.

The Yoshida Doctrine set the tone for Japan's economic miracle and alignment with the West. However, Yoshida's "one man" leadership and anti-communist stance was criticized and eventually led to the defection of many Diet members from his party to the new Democratic Party, causing his cabinet to resign on December 7, 1954.

=== Fall of Shigeru Yoshida ===
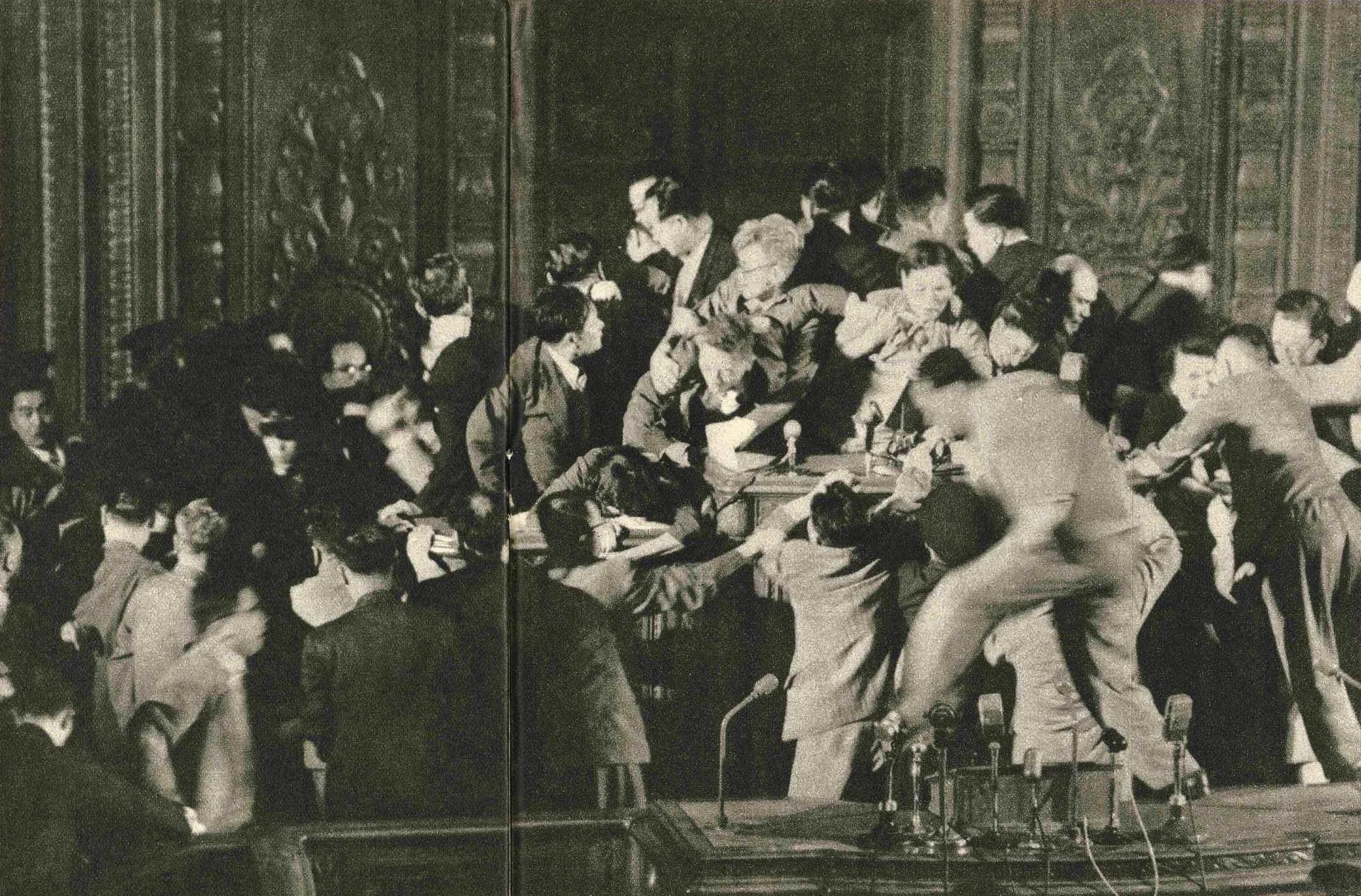
Diet members brawl due to the steamrolling of the amendment to the Police Act.

The criticisms of Yoshida cabinet mainly focused on three issues:

1. In 1951, the San Francisco Peace Treaty and the Security Treaty Between the United States and Japan were signed under Yoshida cabinet. The Peace Treaty was signed without the Communist Bloc's presence, and was condemned by the Communist Party for its anti-communist stance. The Security Treaty was criticized by both the Communist Party and the Socialist Party for the risk of remilitarization, while also criticized by the conservatives for putting Japan in a subordinate position, since Japan was asked to provide military bases for the U.S.'s forces.
2. During the fifth Yoshida cabinet, several bills were passed with the strong opposition of the Left Socialist Party of Japan and the Right Socialist Party of Japan. These included: the Strike Control Act, the Mutual Defense Assistance Agreement between Japan and the United States of America, two education acts which restricted the political participation of school teachers, amendment to the Police Act, Self-Defense Forces Act. Among which, the amendment to the Police Act was pushed through with the opposition parties absent from the Diet.
3. The Yoshida cabinet was also involved in two major corruption cases. One is known as the Hozen Keizai Kai Incident (保全経済会事件). Masutomi Ito, the director of the financial institution Hozen Keizai Kai, was accused of fraud and suspected of making political bribery, which resulted in the arrests of several conservative politicians. The other is known as the Shipbuilding Bribery (造船疑獄), in which the shipping business and shipbuilding business were proved to be making pay-offs to conservative politicians. Influential politicians in the ruling party such as Eisaku Sato and Hayato Ikeda were suspected as bribe takers. The Yoshida cabinet reacted to this incident by stopping the arrest of Eisaku Sato.

The three controversies led to the gathering of anti-Yoshida forces. On October 20, 1954, anti-Yoshida conservatives formed a coalition party: the Japan Democratic Party. The Japan Democratic Party along with the Left Socialist Party of Japan and the Right Socialist Party of Japan tabled a no-confidence motion against the cabinet on December 6 and won the majority. As a result, Yoshida Cabinet resigned on December 7 after six years of rule.

== Establishment of the 1955 System ==
=== Merger of the Japan Socialist Party (JSP) ===
Within the Socialist party, ideological conflicts had long been a problem. The leftists in the party adopted a Marxist ideology, while the rightists leaned towards a socialist welfare nation under a capitalist system. The San Francisco Peace Treaty and the Security Treaty Between the United States and Japan signed in 1951 triggered the final split. The right socialists agreed on the San Francisco Peace Treaty but were against the Security Treaty, due to their constitutionalist stance, while the left socialists were against both treaties due to their exclusion of the Soviet Union. On October 23, 1951, the old Socialist Party officially split into the Left Socialist Party of Japan and the Right Socialist Party of Japan.

After the split, however, the socialists soon realized the necessity of merging into one party to fight against the anti-communist approach taken by the GHQ and the conservatives, which is commonly referred to as the reverse course (逆コース). After the San Francisco Peace Treaty came into effect, influential members from the Right Socialist Party of Japan came back from the purge and boosted the power of the rightists. The Left Socialist Party of Japan also expanded its power with the support of the General Council of Trade Unions of Japan, also known as Sohyo (日本労働組合総評議会). Meanwhile, the conservative government was suffering criticisms from the public for the corruption scandals and Security Treaty. Sensing the possibility of success, despite their ideological differences, to take power from the political right and fight against the anti-communist movement, the socialists decided to reunite and formed the Japan Socialist Party (JSP) on October 13, 1955.

Before the merger: House of Representatives seat distribution in 1955.

One crucial external factor that caused the merger of JSD is Sōhyō. Sōhyō, the abbreviation of the General Council of Trade Unions of Japan, was a trade confederation in Japan which was established on July 11, 1950, soon after the start of the Korean War. It incorporated about 48% of organized workers in Japan. Initially, Sōhyō was the unified body of anti-communist unions, but it soon changed from a centralist stance to a left stance due to the remilitarization tendency of Japan shown in the Korean War. Due to the rationalization strategy taken by the conservative government Japanese workers, particular those who worked in small and median-sized factories, were facing slow wage increase and even dismissals. In response, Sōhyō organized the anti-rationalization campaign and pressured the merger of JSP.

=== Merger of the Liberal Democratic Party of Japan (LDP) ===
After the merger: House of Representatives seat distribution in 1958.

In the 1955 general election, the conservative Japan Democratic Party won the ruling position. Meanwhile, the Left Socialist Party of Japan was able to win 17 more seats. The expansion of Left Socialist Party of Japan and the impending merger of the leftists and rightists in the socialist camp into the JSP established a more substantial threat for the conservatives. As a result, also in 1955, the Japan Democratic Party and the Japan Liberal Party merged as Liberal Democratic Party of Japan (LDP).

The expansion of the socialist power also worried the zaikai (business community). The zaikai had incentives to secure a conservative government since it would pump money into the big companies to keep their competitiveness, stay in a close relationship with the U.S. to maintain a liberal trade policy, and deal with the intensified labor movement. Therefore, to counter the socialist power, the zaikai pressured the Liberal Party and the Democratic Party to merge.

A third factor was the United States, which feared that a victory by the Socialists would lead Japan down a path toward communist revolution. Accordingly, the CIA was involved in helping encourage and support the merger of the Japanese conservative parties to form the LDP.

=== Outcome of the merger: 1955 System ===
After the formation of the two major parties, JSP and LDP, a general election was held in 1958. Although the Socialist Party was gaining more power at the time, the conservative Liberal Party and Democratic Party had more voters from the beginning, and were able to consolidate support after their merger. As a result, the LDP won almost twice as many seats as the JSP. The 1955 system, also known as the "one-and-a-half system," was established, in which the LDP maintained its status as the dominant party, while the JSP was never able to muster enough support to seriously challenge it.

The 1955 system centered around the two parties' confrontation over two major issues: the 1947 constitution and the Security Treaty. During the occupation years, Minister Matsumoto Joji (松本烝治) drafted the 1946 constitution under the demand of General Douglas MacArthur. Unsatisfied with the draft, SCAP revised it, and it served as the banner for SCAP's efforts to democratize and demilitarize Japan. The conservative parties had wished to revise the constitution since its enactment, particularly Article 9. At the same time, the socialist parties opposed any revision of the constitution.

Another issue was the Security Treaty signed in 1951, a product of the late occupation years. Unlike the 1946 constitution, designed to wipe out militarism in Japan, the Security Treaty was the result of the U.S. wishing to secure its military strength in Asia to counter the communist threat in the Cold War. The JSP strongly opposed the Security Treaty due to fears of rearmament or a revival of militarism in Japan, while the LDP argued that the presence of the U.S. army in Japan was merely for self-defense.

=== Challenge to the 1955 System: the 1960 Anpo protests ===
In 1960, the JSP and the JCP, working in coalition with the Zengakuren student federation, the Sōhyō labor federation, and a variety of civic groups, managed to mount the massive, nationwide Anpo Protests against the attempt by the LDP to revise the Security Treaty. Because of the size of the protests and dogged JSP opposition in the Diet, ratification of the revised treaty proved extremely difficult. After Prime Minister Nobusuke Kishi forcibly rammed the new treaty through the Diet against the objections of several factions of his own party, it looked like the 1955 System was on the verge of collapse, as several LDP factions began making plans to bolt from the party. However, intense public outrage at Kishi's actions exploded in even larger demonstrations, and Kishi was forced to resign. Kishi was replaced as prime minister by Hayato Ikeda, who managed to tame factional rivalries and stabilize the 1955 System. Because the 1955 system did not become stabilized until after the cataclysmic events of 1960, historian Nick Kapur has argued that it would make more sense to speak of a "1960 system."

== LDP dominance in the 1955 system ==
=== Electoral system ===
The electoral system that was used under the 1955 system is known as the Single Nontransferable Vote (SNTV). Under SNTV, each constituency has multiple seats to be filled. Instead of voting for parties, voters vote for individual candidates, and seats of the constituency go to whoever wins the most votes. One problem of SNTV is that the fair allocation of seats to different parties are not taken into consideration: since the winners of most votes eventually get the seats, candidates of one party can take all the seats of one constituency.

Under such an electoral system, LDP with its massive political donations put other opposition parties at a disadvantage. Due to LDP's ties with big companies, the party commanded substantial financial resources, which it directed to individual candidates to enable them to promise patronage to their voters, with a focus on the agricultural population, as the reallocation of Diet seats did not keep up with the migration from rural to urban areas due to industrialisation. Aside from the pork barrel spending, LDP candidates also cultivated rapport through koenkai in their own constituencies. Politicians went to the locals' wedding, funeral, birthday parties and so on. On such occasions, politicians often brought considerable amount of cash gifts. Candidates would even organise activities such as visits to hot springs for their supporters.

On the account of its self-assertiveness, LDP unilaterally altered the rules for campaigning. Profiting off its constituted koenkai canvas, the competition rules were toughened for the opposition. The formal campaign periods were short (and shortened further over time), television and radio advertising being prohibited and low limits placed on posters and handbills. Through the campaign, however, each candidate was granted two five-minute slots on television when a stream of candidates would line up and take turns in front of a stationary microphone to run through their list of promises right after which the next candidate would take other. Such rules of play were discouraging and difficult for a would-be challenger while LDP benefited from the unfair restraints of participation by the sheer number of runners.

Another neglected flaw of the electoral system, which bolstered LDP's dominance, was the urgent need for redistricting in the wake of the post-war rapid population shifts from the rural to urban areas. The swelling urban populations were much trickier for LDP politicians to fit within the distributed koenkai grassroot structure, as they were more peripatetic and atomized than the traditional rural household. These voters had new policy demands (e.g. issues related to environmental deterioration in the 1960s) which conflicted with the ones practiced by LDP for their industry and big-business support. Under the obsolete district constituencies, the farmers retained disproportionate political influence which, as a consequence of pork barrel desires rather than by concern over issues of broad social policy, stagnated democratic alternation.

Under the current electoral rules, LDP was motivated to develop loyal personal support for the farmer's voter group. Being a nationally organized group of voters and united around the single issue of agricultural protectionism, the party could tune higher import tariffs and subsidies to support the less productive small businesses which, because of their large numbers, could turn out at elections and vote in predictable ways.

=== Bureaucratization of policymaking ===
Since the establishment of the 1955 system, the legislative independence has been declining in the face of a growth in the combined legislative power of the bureaucracy and the ruling conservative party. Indicators that point to this are the success rates of governmental and individual member bills, the declining rate of amendments added, and the singular lack of success for opposition-sponsored bills. For example, the mere submission of non-governmentally sponsored measures is extremely difficult. In the Lower House, at least 20 representatives must support a "member" bill before it can be introduced, while in the Upper House ten supporters are required. Moreover, should the bill require the expenditure of state funds, fifty and twenty supporters respectively are necessary.

The chance for success of bureaucratic bills that was only 1.3 times greater than that for individual Diet-generated bills under the Occupation and about twice as great from 1952 to 1955, it augmented to 7 times greater by 1974, when approximately 90% of all successful legislation has been cabinet-sponsored. In addition, the Diet has not been notably active as a potential amender for which there are two devices open: it can either "amend" (shusei), or it can "add supplementary resolution of clarification" (futai ketsugi). From 1955 to 1960 just over one-third of all successful government legislation went through one or another of these processes. In the 48th Diet (1964–1965) this rate was 17% and in the 63rd Diet (1970) it was 15%. Finally, opposition bills had no chance of success: of 317 opposition bills introduced from the 37th (1960) through the 46th (1963–1964) Diets, not one became law. These numbers attest that by the time bills materialize in the Diet a general agreement has already been reached, both within and between the bureaucracy and the LDP. In such an environment, opposition and the generation of successful alternatives from within the Diet itself has become extremely difficult.

Furthermore, the bureaucracy wields considerable and increasing power through the use of non-legislative devices such a subordinances and communications, and through its varying degrees of dominance over technical and nonpartisan advisory groups.

=== Policy decision-making ===
The Policy Affairs Research Council (政務調査会, seimu chōsakai) or "PARC" was the major policymaking body within the LDP. Its members were the LDP representatives in both legislative houses, and it was the basic forum in which the party discussed and negotiated government policy. The policymaking under this system did not comply with the usual model of a parliamentary cabinet government which involves strong cabinet leadership and coordination. Instead, representatives who were not in the cabinet were often the other pivot of policy through their formal roles within PARC. In consultation with bureaucrats and interested groups, the council already had input into policy before the cabinet and prime minister or upper party executives could shape it further. At its height in the mid-1980s, PARC had as many as seventeen divisions.

==== Industrial policy ====
Japan's industrial policy under the 1955 system was undergirded by a political logic that supports firms and whole industries that would not have been sustainable in a less-regulated economy, imposed high prices and taxes, limited choice in the marketplace, and rigid career paths. In spite of the fact that Japan came out of war with a theoretical comparative advantage towards light manufacturing which would match its profile of low-capital, abundant-labor economy, the war skewed its economic profile toward heavy industries. The large war companies lobbied for a development strategy favoring heavy industry and received subsidies and regulatory favoritism. In exchange, LDP members were awarded with campaign contributions to be able to stay electorally competitive against each other in the multi-member districts.

The Heavy Industries Bureau of the Ministry of International Trade and Industry assisted the heavy industries with policies such as:

- Limiting entry and often regulating the market pricing to help stabilize profits.
- Privileging access to cheap loans from the Development Bank of Japan.
- Domestic government budget subsidies and tax breaks as well as favored access to foreign exchange and tariff protections.

Such strategy of developmental policy which has strong state involvement in developmental orientation is typical of late industrialising countries and in terms of international political economy, follows the model of the developmental state. Explicit implication implies a degree of corruption, which during Kakuei Tanaka's office in 1971–1972 resulted in media noticing corruption which, in one instance, resulted in the Lockheed scandal.

== Brief fall of the system ==
House of Representatives seat distribution in 1993. The LDP lost its majority for the first time after 38 years.

House of Representatives seat distribution in 1996. The support for the JSP's successor, the SDP, collapsed after they chose to form a grand coalition with the LDP. The Democratic Party (DPJ) later succeeded the JSP as the largest opposition party.

=== Global pressure and the collapse of bubble economy ===
As a corollary of the Plaza Accord of 1985 when Japan agreed to allow substantial appreciation of the yen, the Japanese government reduced the interests marginally above the rate of inflation as a domestic relief strategy. This resulted in banks and corporations going on an enormous spending spree with nearly free money, bidding up the price of real estate and other assets.

Against the faith of many people that Japan would come to dominate the world economy, the Japanese asset price bubble led to a bubble crash after the raising of interest rates of the Bank of Japan in 1990 and firms together with their jobs were in mortal danger. In this context and on the background of LDP's short-term relieved pressure from the already shaky electoral coalition between exporters and the non-traded sectors, the voting public expressed disenchantment toward the ruling LDP. The LDP lost its majority following the 1993 election. The JSP joined the government with seven other opposition parties which exclude the JCP. But the coalition government only existed for 11 months. In June 1994, the JSP formed a grand coalition with the LDP.

=== After 1993 ===
Following the 1994 Electoral reform bill a new electoral system was introduced which was claimed to reduce corruption and high elections costs, promote more policy debates, and encourage a two-party system. As a consequence of this reform, as well as the change of voter behavior and the change of the international environment, the system collapsed completely following the 2005 and 2009 general elections which demonstrated significant shifts in both the foundations of party support and the importance of national swings in support for one party or another. Since 2005, urban-rural differences in the foundations of the leading parties have changed dramatically, and Japan has moved from a system dominated by locally based, individual candidacies toward a two-party system in which both party popularity and personal characteristics influence electoral success or failure.

The specialist on theoretical knowledge of legislative institutions and electoral systems, Michael Thies, argues that majoritarian institutions of the Anglo-American variety would have pushed politics toward broader coalitions, reducing the premiums captured by organized groups with extreme preferences, and appealing more to the interests of unorganized, diverse voters. A study on the representation of unorganized groups under proportional representation (featuring multi-member voting-districts) concludes that closed-list proportional representation makes legislators generally more responsive to interest groups and less responsive to unorganized voters than single-member districts. An even representation would have given labor a persistent and politically potent voice of the kind seen in continental Europe.

Kentaro Yamamoto, professor at Hokkai Gakuen University, argued that, following political reform, Japanese party politics had shifted from a left-versus-right-wing "ideological conflict" between the LDP and JSP to "a competition between the LDP and the leading opposition party for 'better governance.'"

== See also ==
- Government-business relations in Japan
- Koenkai
