= 1994 Japanese electoral reform =

The 1994 electoral reform in Japan was a change from the previous single non-transferable vote (SNTV) system of multi-member districts (MMD) to a mixed electoral system of single-member districts (SMD) with plurality voting and a party list system with proportional representation. The reform had three main objectives: change the one-party dominance of the Liberal Democratic Party (LDP) from the previous 1955 system to a two-party system with alternation in power, reduce the cost of elections and campaigns, and change campaign focus from individual-centered to party-centered.

== Criticisms of the previous system ==
=== LDP dominance ===
The 1955 system saw the emergence of two main parties, the LDP and the Japanese Socialist Party (JSP). The LDP was created in November 1955 by the combination of two conservative parties, Japan Democratic Party and Liberal Party. This, plus the reformation of the JSP, created a "one and a half party system", as oftentimes the LDP had twice as many seats as the opposition within the legislature. Following this, the LDP remained in power for the next 38 years until 1993. The LDP was made up of many powerful factions within the party which acted as "parties within a party". These factions generally conducted deals with each other behind closed doors to choose the next prime minister, and in return, the prime minister made sure to allocate Cabinet positions across all factions. These factions played a major role in influencing the LDP's policies and agendas.

Although the previous system began as a "one and a half party system", over time, the opposition splintered. Meanwhile, the LDP came to dominate the government by winning reelection after reelection through a pragmatic approach to gain voters. The party also used their incumbency to create strong connections with the bureaucracy and with businesses. This relationship was called the Iron Triangle and helped the LDP maintain their power and influence. An example of this, called amakudari, is when the LDP would give high-ranking, high-paying corporation jobs to retired bureaucrats in return for government approval for projects (such as public works) that employed companies (such as construction) that supported the LDP. This concept was most apparent during Tanaka Kakuei's time as prime minister in the 1970s.

However, as globalization increased, the isolationist party was forced to open up to foreign companies and investment. Increased affluence in the citizens and urbanization also impacted the rural-based LDP's power. With urbanization also came liberalization, and citizens' interests and the media started to diversify. In addition, the changing demographics to an aging society forced the LDP to start new welfare programs, and introduced the 3% sales tax in 1989 to increase funding, much to the dismay of the voters. The economic bubble also collapsed in 1991, bringing a shock to the legitimacy of the LDP. Money politics, including business deals between companies and the party, along with pork barrel spending and patronage systems led to finance scandals and corruption, as mentioned below.

=== Money politics ===
Due to several economic changes in the later half of the 20th century, LDP members grew increasingly wealthy. Especially in the 1970s and 1980s, many used their position of power to take advantage of opportunities in real estate and the stock market. As this happened, the number of scandals and corruption increased. Consequently, confidence in the LDP decreased as money scandals continued to plague the Diet.

==== Pork barrel politics ====
Another major characteristic of Japanese politics prior to reformation was pork barrel politics: spending from the national budget on a certain district in return for votes and other supporting contributions. One important factor within pork barrel politics is the concept of the koenkai. This is a group of a politician's followers and serves as a middle ground for providing voter and financial support to politicians and granting favors to constituents. The stronger the politician's influence and power, the stronger his or her koenkai will be. If the politician can engage in pork barrel politics and provide national spending on local projects, the more influence and power the politician can gain in his/her constituency.

==== Corruption ====
Many money-related scandals occurred between LDP politicians and businesses during the 1955 system. Some businesses with close relationships with the LDP thrived because of favors granted to them via state intervention. Some ways this happened was through tax breaks, grants, or permits that eliminated other business competition. Listed below is an example of a scandal that occurred during the Tanaka Cabinet.

===== Tanaka Cabinet (1972–1974) =====
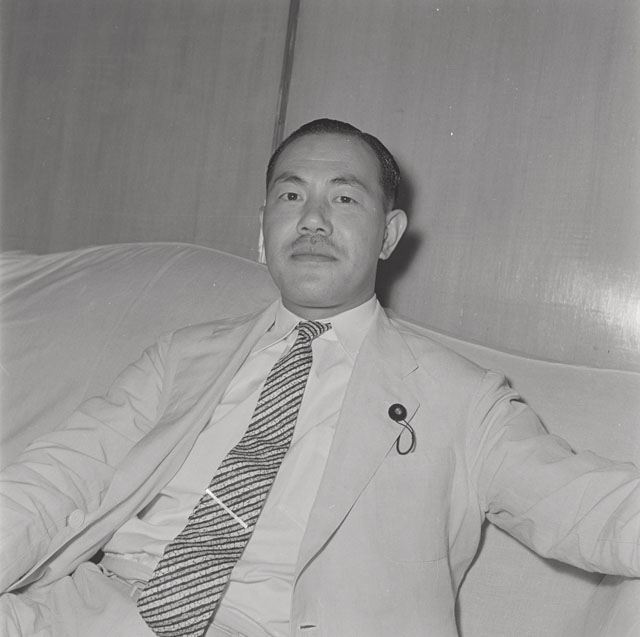
Tanaka Kakuei as 40th prime minister of Japan. (1972–1974)

The Tanaka Kakuei I Cabinet lasted from April 26, 1972, to January 24, 1974.

One of the primary concerns regarding Tanaka's presence in Japanese politics was the structural corruption (kōzō oshoku) based on his frequent use of money to influence politics. Tanaka was arrested for accepting a bribe for the first time shortly after he entered the National Diet. Interest mining groups in Fukuoka paid him approximately ¥1 million to vote against the nationalization of coal mines.

In 1974, Tanaka approved a request by Osano Kenji, a prominent Japanese businessman and hotel owner, to purchase the Princess Kaiulani Hotel in Hawaii with exported funds, despite high restriction on the export of capital. In return, Osano bought one of Tanaka's near bankrupt construction companies.

Tanaka often used the custom of gift giving in Japanese culture to hand out funds to his party members. The press claimed in that in 1974, ¥3 to ¥5 million was given to every member of the Diet as well as chiefs and ministries of the bureau all under the cover of summer gifts (o-chūgen).

The Lockheed bribery scandals in the 1970s refer to several bribes accepted during Tanaka's time as prime minister. After accepting a bribe of ¥3 million from Lockheed, Tanaka influenced the Ministry of Transportation and All Nippon Airways to create a contract with Lockheed Aircraft.

Even after Tanaka's arrest and forced resignation as an LDP member in 1976, the faction which he led within the party continued to have a significant influence in Japanese politics. They had enough power to be able control who would be elected the next prime minister as well as creating public policies.

=== Candidate vs party strength imbalance ===
The focus on candidates rather than issues and policies strengthened the candidate disproportionately against the party they represented. This was caused by the combination of SNTV and multi-member districts (MMD). Under an SNTV system, voters cast one vote for one candidate. An MMD system indicates that multiple winners from each district get sent to the national legislature. Normally, MMD win seat numbers based on the number of votes the party receives. The SNTV system, however, allowed parties to run multiple candidates at once and voters would choose among candidates. Because of this, candidates needed to differentiate themselves to voters, creating an environment where the personality of the candidate became more important than the party they represented. Candidates relied on pork barrel politics, patronage, and other favors to their constituents for votes in return. Reformers hoped that the change would encourage party centered, issue and policy based campaigns, so voters would know what the entire party stands for and push for at the national scale, as opposed to a candidate centered campaign where voting was simply based on candidate charisma or the candidate's promises to bring local benefits from national funds.

== Discussion leading up to reform ==
=== LDP reformers ===
Some members within the LDP were frustrated with the internal structure of the party itself. Besides already mentioned issues of corruption, another problem was the need for consensus from faction leaders before any significant initiatives could be put into action. Subsidies for farmers, banks, retailers, and zombie companies were also frequent complaints.

==== Hata Tsutomu ====
From 1990 to 1991, Finance Minister Hata Tsutomu proposed several reform ideas. These included replacing the previous SNTV system with a mixed system of single-member districts and proportional representation. This, however, was argued against and turned down on the basis that current struggles would soon pass and the Diet should not so quickly abandon their original system.

==== Ozawa Ichirō ====
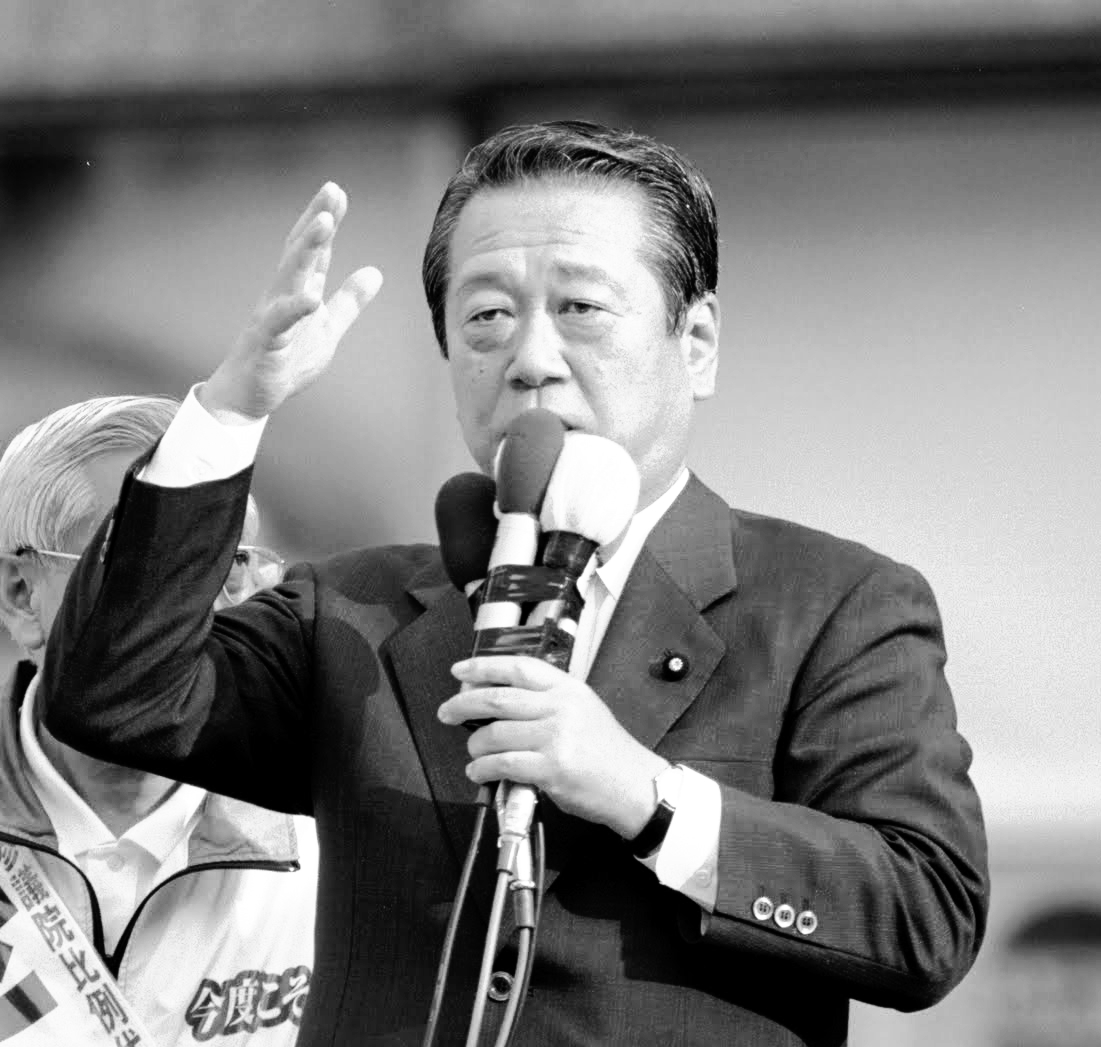
July 18, 2001. Ozawa Ichirō makes a speech in Hokkaidō for Yoshitaka Kimoto's campaign.

Another one of the most significant figures among LDP defectors was Ozawa Ichirō, a significant member of one of the LDP's many factions. This faction was led by former Prime Minister Takeshita Noboru. Takeshita was a supporter of Prime Minister Miyazawa Kiichi. Miyazawa had once promised to introduce reforms that were aimed to deal with effects of the scandals and economic collapse prior to 1993. Reforms included a system of 500 single member districts, elected by plurality voting. Pressure from other factions, however, eventually made Miyazawa back away from any promise of reform, and no agreement was made.

Ozawa and Hata split from the LDP and formed the Renewal Party along with 44 of their supporters, which eventually grew into an eight-party coalition led by Hosokawa Morihiro, leader of the Japan New Party, and Miyazawa's previous government was replaced in the 1993 election. For the first time since the 1955 system, the LDP lost its majority in the House of Representatives and became the opposition. The Japan Socialist Party (JSP) became the new party in power under the Hosokawa Cabinet.

=== Hosokawa Cabinet (1993–1994) ===
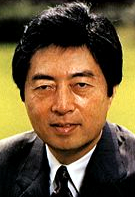
Hosokawa Morihiro as the 50th prime minister of Japan. He is the first non-LDP Prime Minister since 1955.

The Hosokawa Cabinet lasted from August 9, 1993, to April 28, 1994, and was led by Hosokawa Morihiro. This was largely influenced by Ozawa, who advocated for Hosokawa to lead the coalition of parties that banded together against the LDP.

At first, reception of the cabinet was positive. In public opinion polls, Hosokawa received an approximate 70% level of support. Ozawa, a key influence during this time, publicized his goals of this new cabinet that included a change in the electoral system of the lower house, anti-corruption legislation, election of politicians who had responsibility to the electorate over the bureaucracy, a system of competitive parties instead of a single party dominate system, and a shift in focus away from personal voting and towards policies and issues.

The Hosokawa coalition first proposed reform in August 1993 which proposed 500 seats, 250 seats allocated to SMD with plurality voting, while the other 250 seats voted in by proportional representation. However, although the JSP favored maximization of proportional representation, the LDP desired the most SMD seats possible. As for the anti-corruption issues, the LDP advocated a more relaxed regime, while the JSP wanted to ensure legislation against money-related corruption.

By November 1993, Hosokawa and the new LDP President Kono Yohei put forth a compromise proposal with 274 SMD seats and 226 proportional representation seats. Although this proposal passed in the lower house, in January 1994, members from both the JSP and the LDP voted against this proposal in the lower house.

== Electoral reform ==
Finally, on January 29, 1994, the parties agreed upon and passed the electoral reform law. This law changed the electoral system from having 130 MMD and 511 seats to the new system of 300 SMD seats elected through plurality voting, and 200 proportional representation seats elected from eleven regional blocs.

The three main objectives of the election reform was to create a two party system with alternation in power, reduce cost of elections and levels of corruption, and create more party-centered campaigns rather than individual candidate-centered campaigns.

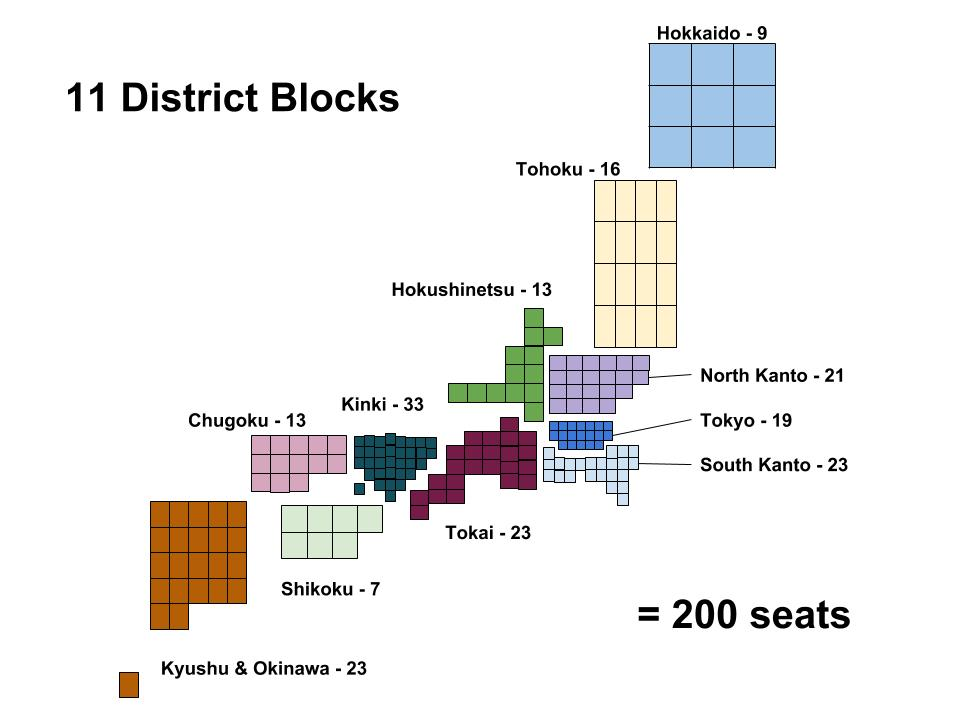
PR districts and seat distribution created by the 1994 reform.

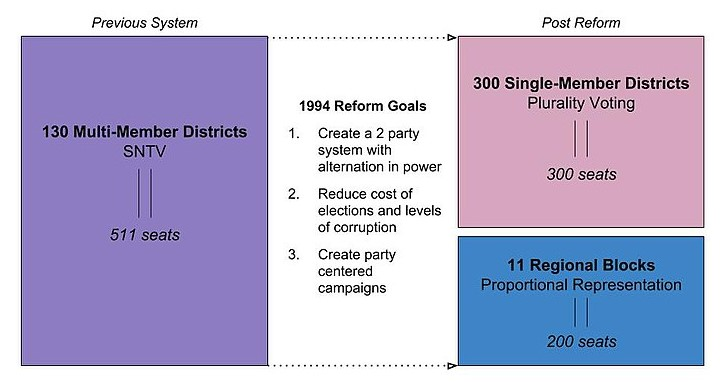
Electoral system changes due to the 1994 reform.

== After reform ==
=== Two-party system ===
For a brief time, Japan was able to have a two party system between the LDP and the Democratic Party of Japan (DPJ). There were several factors that allowed the DPJ to rise above the LDP. Unlike other opposition groups, the DPJ's ability to be flexible with regards to ideology made it easy for LDP opposition groups to join the party. The plurality elections also created a strong incentive for consolidation in two large parties rather than multiple small parties.

==== Original rise of the Democratic Party of Japan ====
The DPJ was able to rise as the principal challenger to the LDP due to emphasis on single-member districts. The DPJ made an agreement with the Communist Party of Japan to withdraw in many districts, which allowed the DPJ to become the main opposition to the LDP. Shown in the table below, the 2009 election has a unified opposition that allowed for the DPJ to gain power over the LDP, compared to the 1993 election where the opposition is splintered. Many small parties received seats, but without unification the opposition could not stand up to the LDP.

1993 pre-reform general election	1996 General Election	2000 General Election	2009 General Election
1993 Japanese General Election	1996 Japanese General Election	2000 Japanese General Election	2009 Japanese General Election
LDP: 223 seats JSP: 70 seats Komeito: 51 seats Shinseito: 55 seats Communist: 15 seats DSP: 15 seats Sakigake: 13 seats SDF: 4 seats Nipponshin: 35 seats Other: 30 seats	LDP: 239 seats New Frontier Party: 156 seats DPJ: 52 seats Social Democratic: 15 seats Communist: 26 seats Sakigake: 2 seats Democratic Reform Party: 1 seat Other: 9 seats	LDP: 233 seats DPJ: 127 seats Komeito: 31 seats Communist: 20 seats Conservative Party: 7 seats Liberal Party: 22 seats Social Democratic: 19 seats Other: 21 seats	LDP: 119 seats DPJ: 308 seats Komeito: 21 seats Communist: 9 seats Social Democratic: 7 seats Nationalist Party: 3 seats Your Party: 5 seats Other: 8 seats

Note: The number of representatives has changed over time, resulting in differences of the total number of representatives over the years.

In the 1993 election, the LDP became the opposition, while the remaining parties (excluding the Communist Party) formed a coalition and took power. This was the last election with the previous multi-member district system.

The 1996 election was the first election with the reform in place. Although the LDP has the largest number of seats, it does not have a majority, as they do not reach 250 in seat number. They formed a coalition with the Social Democratic Party and the Sakigake Party in order to gain power. From this election onward, the LDP has found it necessary to have a coalition in order to be able to form the cabinet. In addition, four of the parties in the 1993 election no longer exist, and are replaced by the New Frontier Party and DPJ. There was already in that year a slight consolidation of the number of political parties, moving one step towards the objective of having a two-party system.

There were slight changes before the 2000 election to reduce the total number of seats to 480. The LDP formed a coalition with Komeito in order to gain power. The LDP–Komeito coalition existed until 2025. Komeito served as an important check to prevent the one-party dominance of the LDP. In this election, we can also see the rising power of the DPJ.

As evidenced by the 2009 election, the two-party system has been accomplished, and the DPJ took power over the LDP. The bipolar competition at the district level left two viable candidates, one from the incumbency and one from the opposition.

=== Money politics ===
==== Effects on election cost ====
The reduced size of the electoral districts decreased the total political funds required for each campaign. However, as most political parties lacked the organizational and financial strength to subsidize the political activities of their own members, koenkai and pork barrel politics accounted for most of the funds.

Pork barrel politics has declined, as the party list campaigns require less effort by individuals for fundraising, and the effort must go on the party. However, as individual candidate campaigns still exist, there is some engagement still in pork barrel spending. However, rather than the electoral reform significantly attributing to the decline of pork barrel politics, it can be seen that the overall decline is a result of demographic changes and economic pressures on the government budget.

==== Effects on corruption ====
The electoral reforms did not directly reduce corruption, although the decline of pork barrel politics led to a decline in corruption, as pork barrel projects were used in the past to win votes from the residents of a district. However, the main cause to decrease corruption came from the revision of the Political Funds Control Law, which were created to establish transparency of the funding that parties receive. However, even with the revision, there are loopholes that still exist, such as through vague wording, utilizing koenkai or the culture of Japanese gift-giving.

=== Campaign focus ===
==== Changes to party-centered campaigns ====
Due to the party list side of the voting system, voters were encouraged to think about parties over individual candidates' personalities. Without any candidates to choose from, parties also had to centralize and strengthen their unification.

The single-member districts of the electoral reform also decreased the intraparty (factional) competition within the LDP, as only one candidate per party was allowed in each district. With only one candidate, rather than looking at the differences between the candidates from the same party voters chose based on party alone. This encouraged consolidation of the party system into two parties. Later, it became clear that the ratio of voters who put a higher priority on the individual candidate decreased under the new single-member district system. Although the LDP factions still exist, they mostly exist only in name, and the pre-reform factional competition was largely unseen after the reform.

The DPJ also started to create party manifestos, which outlined the party's ideology and objectives. This was useful to distinguish itself from the LDP and to write out and explain their goals to the public. The LDP then followed and created its own party manifesto. Creating party manifestos forced parties to come up with coherent ideologies and to centralize and unify themselves, which led to a more party-centered type of campaign.

Due to these reforms, campaigns became party centered. The reforms made sure that all public financing for campaigns and all private contributions went to the party rather than specific individuals. Party media strategies also became party centered, as only public service announcements were allowed on national television.

Other non-reform influences aimed at a more party centered campaign include demographic shifts, urbanization, and the LDP's reduced ability to spend government resources. Demographic shifts demanded a greater amount of funds used for national social welfare spending. Politicians could no longer only focus on their small constituency and thus pork barrel projects decreased. Urbanization called for the need to use broad-based policies for urban voters. As the needs of urban voters vary significantly, and a single candidate cannot appeal to the majority of voters as easily as they could in a rural constituency with generally similar needs. Furthermore, the LDP could not longer easily spend government resources on different candidates within a single party because of the poor economy and increasing government debt. It was necessary instead to centralize campaigns in order to limit their expenses.

==== Existence of individual-centered campaigns ====
Despite the reforms, the traces of individual centered campaigns still exist.

The "best loser" system (Sekihairitsu) in the party list side is a Japanese idiosyncratic rule. To decide who will receive a seat in the party list side, the candidates who lose the most narrowly in the single-member district side of the election are given priority. Thus, candidates have an incentive to win with by the largest margin possible in their own districts. To do this, candidates will still use tactics to try to appeal themselves as an individual candidate in the case that the party they belong to does not win votes enough votes and they need to rely on the "best loser" system.

Despite the electoral and campaign reforms to minimize or eradicate koenkai, a financial support network for politicians, they still exist post-reform. As koenkai are valuable means of funding for candidates, it is not something they would like to easily give up. The incumbents simply align their koenkai to new boundaries, and attract new organizations in the new constituency. The koenkai are especially useful for candidates to mobilize the voters who either will not join a local LDP branch or dislike the LDP. The candidates use their individual appeals to gain these voters. Although the campaign reform only allows funding to go to the party, loopholes still exist to contribute directly or indirectly to a specific candidate.

== See also ==
- 1993 Japanese general election, last election before the reform
- 1996 Japanese general election, first election after the reform
- Electoral systems
- Liberal Democratic Party
  - Democratic Party of Japan
  - Koenkai
- List of districts of the House of Representatives of Japan
- List of political parties in Japan
