= Political funding in Japan =

In Japan, the problem of political funding was intensely debated during the late 1980s and early 1990s, partly as a result of revelations following the Recruit scandal of 1988-89.

== History ==
=== Recruit scandal ===
The scandal arose as a result of the dealings of Ezoe Hiromasa, the ambitious chairman of the board of the Recruit Corporation (a professional search service that had diversified into finance and real estate and had become involved in politics), who sold large blocks of untraded shares in a subsidiary, Recruit Cosmos, to seventy-six individuals. When the stock was traded over the counter in 1986, its price jumped, earning individual investors as much as ¥100 million in after-sales profits. The persons involved included the most influential leaders of the LDP (usually through their aides or spouses) and a smaller number of opposition party figures. Although such insider trading was not strictly illegal, it caused public outrage at a time when the ruling party was considering a highly controversial consumption tax. Before the scandal ran its course, Takeshita Noboru was obliged to resign as prime minister in April 1989, a senior aide committed suicide in expiation for his leader's humiliation, and former Prime Minister Nakasone Yasuhiro resigned from the LDP—becoming an "independent" Diet member—to spare the much-tainted party further shame.

=== Political expenses ===
Regarding the background issue of political funding, a group of parliamentarians belonging to the ruling LDP estimated in 1987 that annual expenses for ten newly elected members of the Diet averaged ¥120 million each, or about US$800,000. This figure, which included expenses for staff and constituent services in a member's home district, including local supporters, was less than the average for Diet members as a whole, because long-term incumbents tended to incur higher expenses. Yet in the late 1980s, the government provided each Diet member with only ¥20 million for annual operating expenses, leaving ¥100 million to be obtained through private contributions, political party faction bosses, or other means. The lack of public funding meant that politicians—especially, but not exclusively, members of the LDP— needed constant infusions of cash or milk money to stay in office.

Maintaining staff and offices in Tokyo and the home district constituted the biggest expense for Diet members. Near-obligatory attendance at the weddings and funerals of constituents and their families, however, was another large financial drain: the Japanese custom requires that attendees contribute cash, handed over discreetly in elaborately decorated envelopes, to the parents of the bride and groom or to the bereaved. In contrast with multimillion-dollar United States political campaigns, direct expenses for the comparatively short campaigns before Japanese general, upper house, and local elections are relatively modest. The use of posters and pamphlets is strictly regulated, and candidates appear on noncommercial public television stations, NHK, to give short campaign speeches. Most of this activity is publicly funded. Campaign sound-trucks weave their way through urban and rural streets, often bombarding residents with earsplitting harangues from candidates or their supporters. No politician, however, can expect to remain in office without considering expenses for constituent services, the most important component of campaign expenses.

=== Revelations and legislation ===
After revelations of corrupt activities forced the resignation of Prime Minister Tanaka Kakuei, postwar Japan's most skillful practitioner of "money politics," in 1974, the 1948 Political Funds Control Law was amended to establish ceilings for contributions from corporations, other organizations, and individuals. This change forced Diet members to seek a larger number of smaller contributions to maintain cash flow. Fund-raising parties to which tickets were sold were a major revenue source during the 1980s, and the abuse of these ticket sales became a public concern. Another related problem was the secrecy surrounding political funds and their use. Although many politicians, including members of newly appointed cabinets, voluntarily disclosed their personal finances, such disclosure is not compulsory and many sources of revenue remain obscure.

=== Proposed reform ===
Proposals for system reform in the early 1990s included compulsory full disclosure of campaign funding, more generous public allowances for Diet members to reduce (or, ideally, to eliminate) their reliance on under-the-table contributions, and stricter penalties for violators, including lengthy periods of being barred from running for public office. Some commentators advocated replacement of the lower house's multiple-seat election district system with single-seat constituencies like those found in Britain and the United States. It was argued that the multiple-seat districts made election campaigning more expensive because party members from the same district had to compete among themselves for the votes of the same constituents. It was hoped that the smaller size of single-seat districts would also reduce the expense of staff, offices, and constituent services. Critics argued, however, that the creation of single-seat constituencies would virtually eliminate the smaller opposition parties and would either create a United States-style two-party system or give the LDP an even greater majority in the lower house than it enjoyed under the multiple-seat system.

=== Fall of government, installation of reforming minority government ===
In the summer of 1993, the LDP government of Miyazawa Kiichi was brought down largely as a result of its failure to pass effective political reform legislation. The minority government of Hosokawa Morihiro that succeeded it proposed legislation to ban direct contributions by companies or unions to parliamentary candidates and to reform the diet. Public funding of political parties was strengthened, giving each party 250 Yen for each vote it attained.

A new electoral system was installed: The lower house was divided between 300 single-seat constituencies and 200 seats distributed by proportional representation. Candidates on the proportional representation bloc were elected from 11 regional voting blocs, where the party was given a vote. When the LDP gained power again in 1996, large parts of the reform were kept, but the representation bloc was shrunk to 180 seats in the year 2000.

=== Outcome ===
Both critics and advocates of the new system were largely proven right, while there is less political infighting between candidates of one party (unless there is a real difference in opinion, such as the postal privatization issue), the system also reduced the number of small parties. The LDP remained dominant in a coalition government with the New Komeito party, until the Democratic Party of Japan were elected in 2009 under the leadership of Yukio Hatoyama.

== See also ==
- Elections in Japan
- Politics of Japan
- Government-business relations in Japan
- Diet of Japan
