= Industrial policy of Japan =

The industrial policy of Japan was a complicated system devised by the Japanese government after World War II and especially in the 1950s and 1960s. The goal was to promote industrial development by co-operating closely with private firms. The objective of industrial policy was to shift resources to specific industries in order to gain international competitive advantage for Japan. The policies and methods were used primarily to increase the productivity of inputs and to influence, directly or indirectly, industrial investment.

Administrative guidance (gyōsei shidō 行政指導) is a principal instrument of enforcement used extensively throughout the Japanese government to support a wide range of policies. Influence, prestige, advice, and persuasion are used to encourage both corporations and individuals to work in directions judged desirable. The persuasion is exerted and the advice is given by public officials, who often have the power to provide or to withhold loans, grants, subsidies, licenses, tax concessions, government contracts, import permits, foreign exchange, and approval of cartel arrangements. The Japanese use administrative guidance to buffer market swings, anticipate market developments, and enhance market competition.

Mechanisms used by the Japanese government to affect the economy typically relate to trade, labor markets, competition, and tax incentives. They include a broad range of trade protection measures, subsidies, de jure and de facto exemptions from antitrust statutes, labor market adjustments, and industry-specific assistance to enhance the use of new technology. Rather than producing a broad range of goods, the Japanese selected a few areas in which they could develop high-quality goods to produce in vast quantities at competitive prices. A good example is the camera industry, which since the 1960s has been dominated by Japan.

Historically, there have been three main elements in Japanese industrial development. The first was the development of a highly competitive manufacturing sector. The second was the deliberate restructuring of industry toward higher value-added, high productivity industries. In the late 1980s, these were mainly knowledge-intensive tertiary industries. The third element was aggressive domestic and international business strategies.

Japan has few natural resources and depends on massive imports of raw materials. It must export to pay for its imports, and manufacturing and the sales of its services, such as banking and finance, were its principal means of doing so. For these reasons, the careful development of the producing sector has been a key concern of both government and industry throughout most of the twentieth century. Government and business leaders generally agree that the composition of Japan's output must continually shift if living standards are to rise. Government plays an active role in making these shifts, often anticipating economic developments rather than reacting to them.

After World War II, the initial industries that policy makers and the general public felt Japan should have were iron and steel, shipbuilding, the merchant marine, machine industries in general, heavy electrical equipment, and chemicals. Later, they added the automobile industry, petrochemicals, and nuclear power and, in the 1980s, such industries as computers and semiconductors. Since the late 1970s, the government has strongly encouraged the development of knowledge-intensive industries. Government support for research and development grew rapidly in the 1980s, and large joint government-industry development projects in computers and robotics were started. At the same time, government promoted the managed decline of competitively troubled industries, including textiles, shipbuilding, and chemical fertilizers through such measures as tax breaks for corporations that retrained workers to work at other tasks.

Although industrial policy remained important in Japan in the 1970s and 1980s, thinking began to change. Government seemed to intervene less and become more respectful of price mechanisms in guiding future development. During this period, trade and direct foreign investment were liberalized, tariff and nontariff trade barriers were lowered, and the economies of the advanced nations became more integrated, as the result of the growth of international trade and international corporations. In the late 1980s, knowledge-intensive and high-technology industries became prominent. The government showed little inclination to promote such booming parts of the economy as fashion design, advertising, and management consulting. The question at the end of the 1980s was whether the government would become involved in such new developments or whether it would let them progress on their own.

== See also ==
- Economy of Japan
- Government-business relations in Japan
- Amakudari: retired bureaucrats joining the ranks of Japanese companies
