= Recruit scandal =

Insider trading scandal in Japan

The Recruit scandal (Japanese: リクルート事件, Hepburn: Rikurūto jiken) was an insider trading and corruption scandal that forced many prominent Japanese politicians to resign in 1988.

Recruit is a human resources and classifieds company based in Tokyo. Its chairman, Hiromasa Ezoe, offered a number of shares in a Recruit subsidiary, Cosmos, to business leaders and senior politicians shortly before Cosmos went public in 1986. Following the public offering, Cosmos's share price skyrocketed, and the individuals involved in the scheme saw average profits of ¥66 million each.

Although only seventeen members of the Diet were involved in the insider trading, another thirty were later found to have received special favors from Recruit.

Among the politicians involved in the scandal were Prime Minister Noboru Takeshita, former Prime Minister Yasuhiro Nakasone, and Chief Cabinet Secretary Takao Fujinami. In addition to members of the LDP government, leaders of the Komeito, Democratic Party of Japan, and Japan Socialist Party were also found to be involved. As a result, Takeshita's cabinet was forced to resign, although some of its members returned to political prominence later (including future prime ministers Kiichi Miyazawa and Keizō Obuchi).

The chairmen of NTT, the Yomiuri Shimbun, and the Nihon Keizai Shimbun were also involved in the scandal.

Despite the breadth of the Recruit scandal across party lines, the LDP was hurt most significantly by the scandal. It is often said to be one of the main causes of Morihiro Hosokawa's opposition party victory in 1993, which briefly interrupted the LDP's otherwise continuous reign over Japan.

== See also ==
- Government-business relations in Japan
- Political funding in Japan
