= Hiromasa Ezoe =

Japanese industrialist (1936–2013)

- 江副浩正
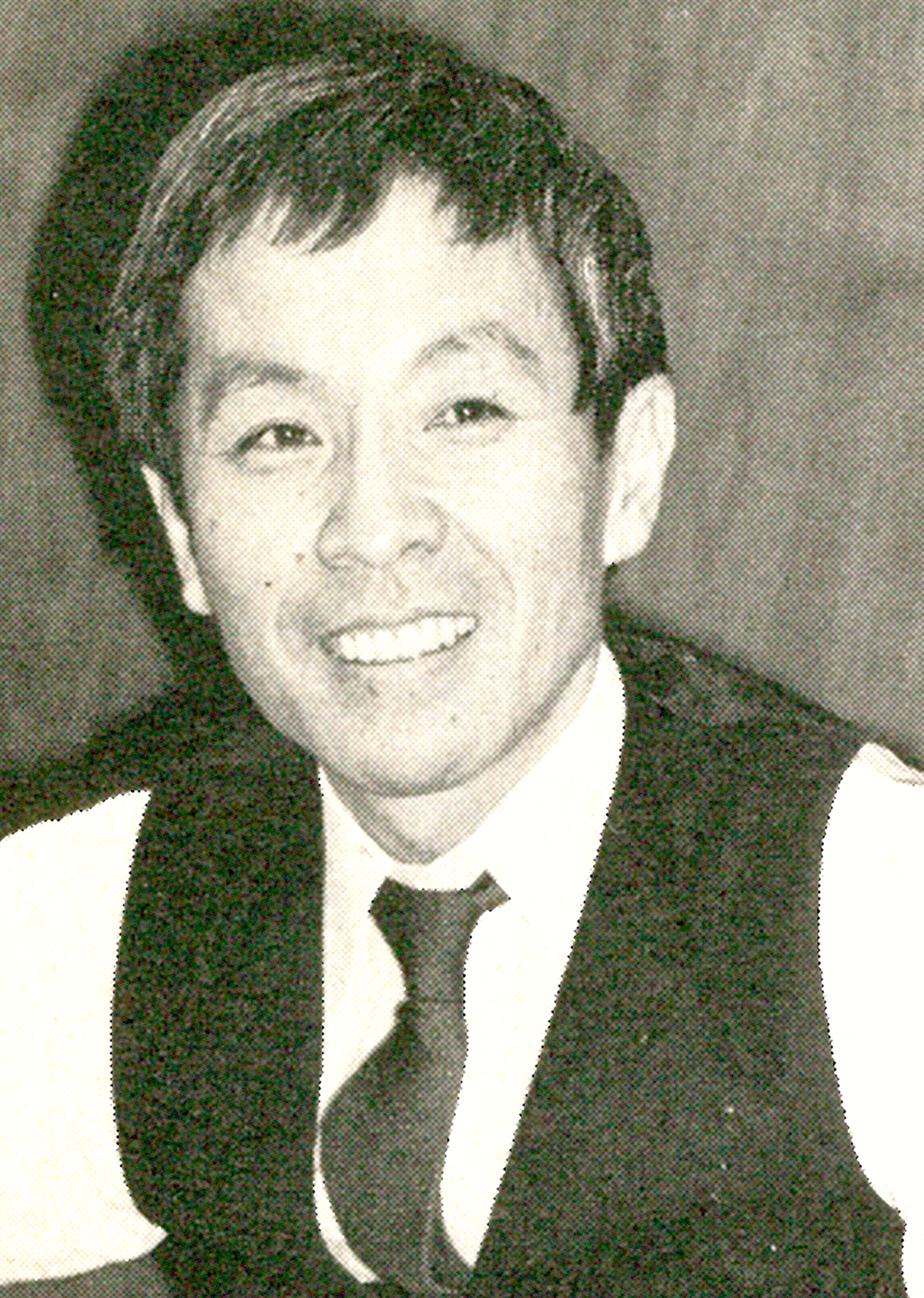
- Born: June 12, 1936; Imabari, Ehime, Japan
- Died: February 8, 2013 (aged 76); Tokyo, Japan
- Education: University of Tokyo
- Known for: Founding Recruit Holdings

Hiromasa Ezoe (June 12, 1936 – February 8, 2013) was a Japanese industrialist who founded Recruit Holdings. He is remembered as one of the most prolific entrepreneurs educated at the University of Tokyo, alongside Kiichiro Toyoda (founder of Toyota) and Namihei Odaira (founder of Hitachi). Ezoe was also the central figure in the Recruit insider trading scandal, which fundamentally changed the Japanese political landscape after the resignation of prominent figures including then-PM Noboru Takeshita.

== Life ==
Hiromasa Ezoe was born in June 1936 in Namikata Village, Ehime Prefecture, where he spent the first three years of his life. His family relocated several times due to his father's teaching career and the impacts of World War II, eventually evacuating to Saga when air raids intensified.

=== Philanthropy and later life ===
Ezoe became a passionate advocate for opera and supported the New National Theatre in Tokyo. He also founded the opera company La Voce and published a memoir detailing his perspective on the Recruit Scandal. His later works advocated for judicial transparency in Japan. Ezoe died in February 2013 due to pneumonia after a fall at Tokyo Station.

== Founding of Recruit Holdings ==
While studying educational psychology at the University of Tokyo, Ezoe founded a company called University Newspaper Advertisement Company, which evolved into Recruit Holdings, in 1960. The business began with a temporary office on the rooftop of the 2nd Mori Building, which was leased by Minoru Mori, also a member of the university newspaper and later the CEO of Mori Building. Early achievements included the publication of Invitation to Companies, a precursor to Recruit Book, which significantly elevated the status of recruitment advertising in Japan. In its 10th year, Recruit established a scholarship programme to support students.

Under Ezoe's leadership, Recruit diversified into various industries, including real estate, travel, and resorts. Notably, it launched projects such as the Appi Kogen Ski Resort and a residential development company, Recruit Cosmos, which later became a major player in its sector.

== Recruit Scandal ==
Ezoe became the central figure in the Recruit Scandal, which surfaced in 1988, leading to his resignation as chairman. His trial, which lasted for 14 years, involved 322 court sessions, the highest number ever recorded in Tokyo District Court history. The prolonged trial reflected the complexity of the case, with 53 contentious points raised by the defence and prosecution. In 2003, he was found guilty and sentenced to three years in prison with a five-year suspended sentence.
