= Koenkai =

Local support networks of Japanese Diet members

Koenkai (後援会; lit. "local support groups") are local support networks of Japanese Diet members, especially of the Liberal Democratic Party (LDP). These groups serve as pipelines through which funds and other support are conveyed to legislators and through which the legislators can distribute favors to constituents in return. To avoid the stringent legal restrictions on political activity outside of designated campaign times, koenkai sponsor year-round cultural, social, and "educational" activities. For example, Tanaka Kakuei used his "iron constituency", or invincible constituency, in rural Niigata Prefecture to build a formidable, nationwide political machine. But other politicians, like Ito Masayoshi, were so popular in their districts that they could refrain, to some extent, from money politics and promote a "clean" image. Koenkai remained particularly important in the over-represented rural areas, where paternalistic, old-style politics flourished and where the LDP had its strongest support.

In the classic oyabun-kobun manner, local people who were consistently loyal to a politician became favored recipients of government largess. In the 1980s, Tanaka's third electoral district in Niigata was the nation's top beneficiary in per capita public works spending. The importance of local loyalties is also reflected in the widespread practice of a second generation's "inheriting" Diet seats from fathers or fathers-in-law. This trend is found predominantly, although not exclusively, in the LDP.

== Introduction ==
=== Definition ===
Koenkai (後援会) are Japanese political support groups centered on individual politicians that emerged in the post-war period. In their most basic form, koenkai serve two functions. First and most importantly, they act as a vote mobilization machine that supports the politician for whom the koenkai was established. Throughout time, the vote-gathering role played by koenkai has been substantial and consistent, especially for the LDP. From 1972 to 2003, people who identified themselves with koenkai were found to be 10% more likely to vote in comparison to people who did not. LDP and DSP politicians ranked koenkai as the most common mean of gathering vote. For the Japan Socialist Party, it was the second most important. From 1972 to 2003, people who identified themselves with koenkai were 10% more likely to vote than people who did not. Secondly, koenkai also helped to channel supporters' wishes and expectations to the party candidate, who would respond accordingly in exchange for votes.

Koenkai are, however, not party political support groups. The individual element implies that the identity of the group is structured upon the candidate's qualities, qualifications, and values. Therefore, members are often introduced to koenkai because of personal connections with the politician, instead of aligning themselves with the ideology of any particular party. At the same time, this allows for the possibility that members of a candidate's koenkai might cast their vote for a politician of a different party. This happened before with the case of Toshiki koenkai, who despite being a conservative politician, was able to win 80% of the vote of CGP (Komeito) supporters in the 2000 election.

=== Structure ===
Koenkai are organized in terms of three factors: location, personal link to a politician, and function (activities, interests, etc.). The first two factors prove to be immensely important, and they are often utilized when a koenkai is first established. Several interviews with politicians who have their own support group in Krauss's Rise and Fall of Japan LDP (2011) point to the fact that politicians usually start out from the region where they live and with the people who they know, e.g. former classmates, family members or colleagues. From that point, it is common for these groups to extend in concentric circles.

Koenkai also display some consistent characteristics. First of all, koenkai are permanent formal-membership organizations. A certain fee, usually of an insignificant amount, is collected upon entrance and a membership card or an equivalent is distributed. Koenkai differ from campaign organization, since activities are held all year round and not limited to election season. Koenkai are better understood as consisting of a network of smaller groups whose interests are tied to one candidate, rather than being a singular, ideologically coherent organization, even though there might exist a headquarter or coordinator group. In an interview in 2002, one candidate stated that he had about 300 smaller koenkai organizations. Some of the commonly observed groups are: the local koenkai (chiiki koenkai), the women's clubs, the enterprise group (taxi drivers, restaurant owners, barbers, etc.), manager-rank supporters, hobby clubs and the elderly club. At any rate, these groups' interests might overlap, and their embodiment was the candidate representing the koenkai.

During the 1980s, the number of people who identified themselves as members of koenkai accounts for 15-18% of the whole electorate. Members of the medium-sized and rural areas were the majority, with farmers, shopkeepers and manufacturers forming the core of parties like LDP. "Floating" voters in urban areas were equally desirable, but their resistance to political enticement was higher due to their volatility. Between 1972 and 2003, more men were shown to be associated with koenkai than women. Even though women membership reached an all-time high in 1993, their participation dropped to just 80% that of men by 2003. Koenkai members also tend to belong to older age groups. People in their twenties are the least likely to join koenkai, while those over fifty are found to be more likely.

=== Activities ===
==== Off-campaign activities ====
Koenkai operate throughout the year, thus there is a need for a wide range of activities to keep members engaged. Due to their non-political characteristics, this function of koenkai is often heavily criticized, especially by the media. Whereas the kinds of activities change according to the interests of different groups, they span an incredible spectrum of seemingly unrelated topics: baseball games, trips to hot-springs, sumo contests, golf tournaments, marathons, finishing competitions, Japanese chess, and so on. Several interviews done by Bouissou (1992) showed that koenkai's members had this idea about "building together a joyful support association" (mina de tanoshii koenkai wo tsukuru).

An example from the koenkai of Issey Koga in Fukuoka, 1992 serves as a particular example. The women's club – Olive-kai (taken after Olive Oyl from the famous Popeye cartoon) – organized several events for its female members throughout the year: cookie or mochi-making session, picture-framing class, outings to the circus, charity sales and monthly "mini-volley" matches. Meetings were held, but they often found themselves at restaurants ended up drinking and eating. Despite the claimed purpose, which was to hear report, politicians also stressed the importance of such meeting to foster friendships.

Besides entertainment, other kinds of activities are equally prioritized. For example, education-centered events like cooking classes, tea ceremonies, and kimono dressing are the most popular. Weddings and funerals constitute their own category since a politician's appearance at these "critical events" are highly appreciated. These trips are extremely well organized. Some politicians even make contact with funeral homes to get prior information and plan well ahead their visits. The number of weddings and funerals that they attend may reach up to 40 to 60 in a month.

==== Campaign period ====
As election time approaches, the frequency of meetings increases and the topics of discussion also become more political. However, the various meetings can all be summed up as to serve one single purpose: collecting more votes. Speeches often aim at encouraging the members to mobilize their friends and relatives to vote for a candidate. This is facilitated with a permanent team of staffs - maximum 30 people - working for the koenkai. Each of them is responsible for an area in the district where the head politician is campaigning. Their daily tasks consist of visiting that area to listen to the demands from the people, reporting on the progress of different projects to them, distributing pictures of their sensei, or relevant information, etc. Koenkai also recruited volunteers to promote their activities and spread information. Membership of this group is flexible. Whether volunteers are retired people who have a lot of time or they are young activists who parade in cars or boats with banners to support their political leader, the use of people at hand is always maximized.

=== Finance ===
The money that is necessary for financing koenkai is provided to politicians by their political factions. This became increasingly important as regulations regarding funding for koenkai were tightened in 1999, further preventing companies and labour unions from providing financial support to koenkai. Nonetheless, koenkai are exorbitant machines to be maintained. In 1996, PR-only candidates' most substantial expenditures were on koenkai, accounting for 38% of total campaign spending. 10 young LDP Diet members revealed their spending account in 1989 and the sum reserved for koenkai equals 18.9 million yen a year. This figure abated over time, to a more modest 20% in 2003. Nonetheless, the actual amount of money spent on personal support groups suggests a considerable sum of money. It is estimated that in the 1980s, the annual cost of running a koenkai approximated US$1 million per year. Another study conducted in 1975 proposed the sum of US$500.000 for a modest koenkai, in contrast to 700.000-1 million USD for more expensive ones.

A large part of this money goes to organizing various activities, especially non-political ones. 15-20% of the designated funds are channeled to different activities held all year round, while another 15-20% are contributed to weddings and funerals. Politicians are expected to make a gift of no less than 50,000 yen for weddings and 20,000 yen for funerals. The membership fee collected at the beginning is barely sufficient for financing these projects, and members are often said to be more than reimbursed because their meager financial contribution is awarded with "trips to hot springs, sightseeing tours of the Diet building, records, fans, towels and souvenirs". With a 1000 yen entrance fee, a councilman from Fukuoka Chuoku took his koenkai members on a cruise around the city's bay "to contemplate the moon in the summer" (outsukiyukai), listen to jazz, enjoy prepared lunch boxes and play bingo. He also distributed free T-shirts.

==== Largest koenkai expenses (1996 and 2000) ====
Names and year	District	Party	Expenses	Names and year	District	Party	Expenses
Takeshita Noboru -1996	Shimane 2	LDP	$2.0 million	Takebe Tsumomu - 2000	Hokkaido 12	LDP	$2.2 million
Takebe Tsutomu - 1996	Hokkaido 12	LDP	$1.7 million	Yamasaki Taku - 2000	Fukuoka 12	LDP	$1.8 million
Yamasaki Taku - 1966	Fukuoka 2	LDP	$1.6 million	Matsushita Tadahiro - 2000	Kyushu bloc	LDP	$1.6 million
Nakayama Masaaki - 1996	Osaka 4	LDP	$1.6 million	Matsuoka Toshikatsu - 2000	Kumamoto 3	LDP	$1.5 million
Hashimoto Ryutaro - 1996	Okayama 4	LDP	$1.5 million	Watanabe Tomoyoshi - 2000	Fukuoka 4	LDP	$1.5 million

== History ==
The earliest record of a koenkai is believed to be that of Yukio Ozaki. While Ozaki's koenkai took the name Gakudokai in 1910, it had already existed for some time prior to this as a personal network which supported Ozaki in his political struggles with oligarchs, bureaucrats, the political parties, and the military. However, the usage of koenkai did not become common until much later. Before that, mobilisation of a party's constituency (jiban) was done by local notables, such as in the case of Kakuei Tanaka, later founder of Etsuzankai, during his first campaign in 1946.

The LDP's jiban was initially made up of the self-employed, those in the agricultural-forestry-fishery industries, and in non-urban areas. From 1955–1965, the self-employed remained relatively stable in size, with its ratio being 24% in 1955 and 26% in 1965, but in contrast to this the ratio of those engaged in agriculture, forestry, and fishing declined from 44% to 33% respectively. In the same time period, 48% of all registered voters in cities with a population less than 100,000, and 48% of all registered voters in smaller towns and villages endorsed the LDP, giving a 66% endorsement in total. On the other hand, the Socialists' main jiban was among industrial workers and the salaried class; in 1955 their supporters were 31% of registered voters, 51% of industrial workers and 50% of the salaried class. By 1965, these figures became 34%, 48% and 45% respectively. In contrast to the LDP, their means of mobilization were through unions and the media, giving rise to the saying "newspapers for the JSP, face for the LDP."

The koenkai slowly began to emerge in 1952, in part due to their usefulness at getting around campaign restrictions. For example, while candidates were permitted to have only one election campaign office, they were allowed to have an unlimited number of koenkai offices. However, they still remained relatively scarce or weak, and even in fiercely competitive districts like Oita 2 and Yamaguchi 2, not all the conservative candidates had built their own koenkai. This changed in 1955 elections when koenkai were to an extent active, being utilised as an organizational base which incorporated the women's associations and local notables, both of which were seen as crucial in the popularity of a candidate. Figures such as the town meeting chairs and crime-prevention committee members were tapped for leadership positions within the koenkai. This eroded the traditional jiban of Diet members, causing more to turn to the use of koenkai to cope.

After the 1955 LDP merger, one of its major goals was to develop local branches, aiming to subsume the koenkai into a robust network of party branches. To this end, from 1956 onwards several workshops were held to train local leaders, resulting in over 22,000 leaders being trained by 1964. This attempt to build a strong local party organization, however, did not amount to much because national Diet members resisted the growth of their own party organization, with tensions between the former Liberal Party and Democratic Party still existing even after the merger. Having been rivals beforehand, they did not merge easily and argued over who would hold power in the local party branches.

Coordinating LDP candidates was made even more difficult because in some districts the koenkai had already formed personal networks that did not come apart or adapt easily, causing the existence of the koenkai in itself to become a hindrance in party efforts to build a network of party branches. In the early 1960s, the LDP attempted to centralize again, announcing a Plan for Organizational Activities (Soshiku Kkatsudō Hoshin), in which party activists were to be educated at party headquarters to learn how to discipline a variety of groups in the local municipalities. This, again, did not work out, and by 1963 the LDP abandoned these efforts and instead started to co-opt the koenkai to serve in place of local branches. Subsequently, koenkai membership rates for the LDP slowly rose, rising from about 8% in 1967 to around 20% in 1976, the latter only exceeded by the Komeito's 24%. On the other hand, while the Socialists relied heavily on unions reinforced by koenkai, their koenkai movement was insignificant compared to the other parties; only 5% of those voting for the JSP in the 1967 general election belonging to koenkai, and even after this figure increased to 13% in the 1976 elections it still lagged behind the koenkai of other parties.

== Why koenkai exist ==
There are several academic studies of koenkai, including those published in English. This section describes some common reasons taken from the academic literature for the existence of koenkai.

=== Urban village explanation ===
This theory supposes that the emergence of koenkai was a response to the incredible economic growth and societal changes that Japan experienced after 1955. The underlying assumption is that Japanese society was characterized by a strong sense of the collective, and evidence has suggested that this sentiment persists well into modernity. The case of Yokohama prefecture showed that despite rapid urbanization which has led to former villages being merged into new districts in the 1990s, the support for Conservative politicians still aligned along the former village's boundaries.

In the past, Japanese people organized their lives around communal farming activities, such as water and tool management. However, the country's economic prosperity destabilized the usual links by which people related to each other, and koenkai was conjured up as a replacement. As has been discussed previously, koenkai's leaders usually start out with their immediate circle of relatives and friends, and the area where they live is to be the first target of the vote-gathering campaign. From this perspective, the urban village explanation offers a striking insight into the existence of koenkai, as it can be seen that the family, close relations and the villages have served as the core value of Japanese lives throughout history. After 1955 we saw its transformation into becoming a more political entity.

This theory is further supported by evidence showing that the chonankai – the neighbourhood associations existing in many regions in Japan – support local politicians and their koenkai in favorable terms. Composed of households of respective areas, chonankai are official types of organizations under the supervision of the government for promoting apolitical activities related to culture, welfare, sports and the likes. Nonetheless, it is suggested that there is a close relationship between koenkai and chonankai heads. In fact, many politicians were chonankai heads in the past, or held an assembly seat at the time. This results in the fact that koenkai's leaders may receive support from neighbourhood association via different channels, and this ultimately affects the residents' consent, to a significant degree, of chonankai endorsing a candidate.

=== Electoral explanation ===
This other line of reasoning views the existence of koenkai from a purely political sense. In general, this theory expounds that the rise of koenkai can be attributed to the peculiarity of the Japanese voting system. Between 1947 and 1993, Japan's electoral system was based upon the single non-transferable vote (SNTV). Under this system, a party was able to send many of its members to a single constituency. If a party wanted to secure the majority in that district, the votes would have to be spread out evenly among its politicians from that region. Any politician receiving an excessive number of votes risked the under-performance of others. Thus, this created a problem for the local party branches, which were in charge of managing candidates' campaigns. The solution was to leave politicians gathering votes on their own devices, since the competition between candidates would encourage them to seek for more support, and the result would be an optimized chance of most politicians winning seats in that district. Because of such changes in campaign regulations, politicians started establishing their own support groups – or koenkai.

Secondly, between 1947 and 1986, the minimum amount of vote required to win a seat in the constituency, calculated in terms of overall vote percentage, was 8%. As it became possible to win the election with a small number of vote, campaign strategy altered from appealing to a vast base of voters, to concentrating on securing firm and loyal support from citizens and cooperation. Among these groups, agriculture co-op and construction companies tended to provide the most significant boost in votes.

Other restrictions made to campaign protocol were highly relevant. Firstly, the period of campaigning was shortened to no more than 12 days. Consequently, politicians were only allowed to appeal to the public during these short periods. Nonetheless, activities that were non-political were tolerated, and therefore, koenkai were created to attract supporters at times other than the permitted 12 days. Candidates were allowed to have only one office, and one campaign car with a public address system. Campaign materials were strictly rationed, for example, 35,000 postcards and 60-100,000 handbills were the maximum that can be utilized. This number equals only 1/7 of the average constituency. All the while, politicians were strictly banned from using media platforms to reach the public. Even though limited appearances in newspapers or on TV was accepted, politicians found themselves being forced to seek other vehicles of support, and koenkai were thought of as the perfect solution.

=== Historical institutionalist explanation ===
The Historical Institutionalist perspective tries to bring more nuances into the development of koenkai. According to Matthew Carlson, "In the historical institutionalism approach ... structure and history are deemed to be the most significant determinant in creating or modifying institutions". Therefore, the timeline relevant to the history of koenkai is traced to figure out the factors on a macro-scale. A few of such variables can be named in the case of koenkai, including the merger of LDP at a koenkai's early development stage, contemporary institutions such as factions, and positive returns that reinforce the base of koenkai over time. Therefore, this theory can even be extended to include the previous two explanations (Urban Village and Electoral) as factors that shape the course of koenkai throughout development.

== Case studies of koenkai ==
=== Kakuei Tanaka ===
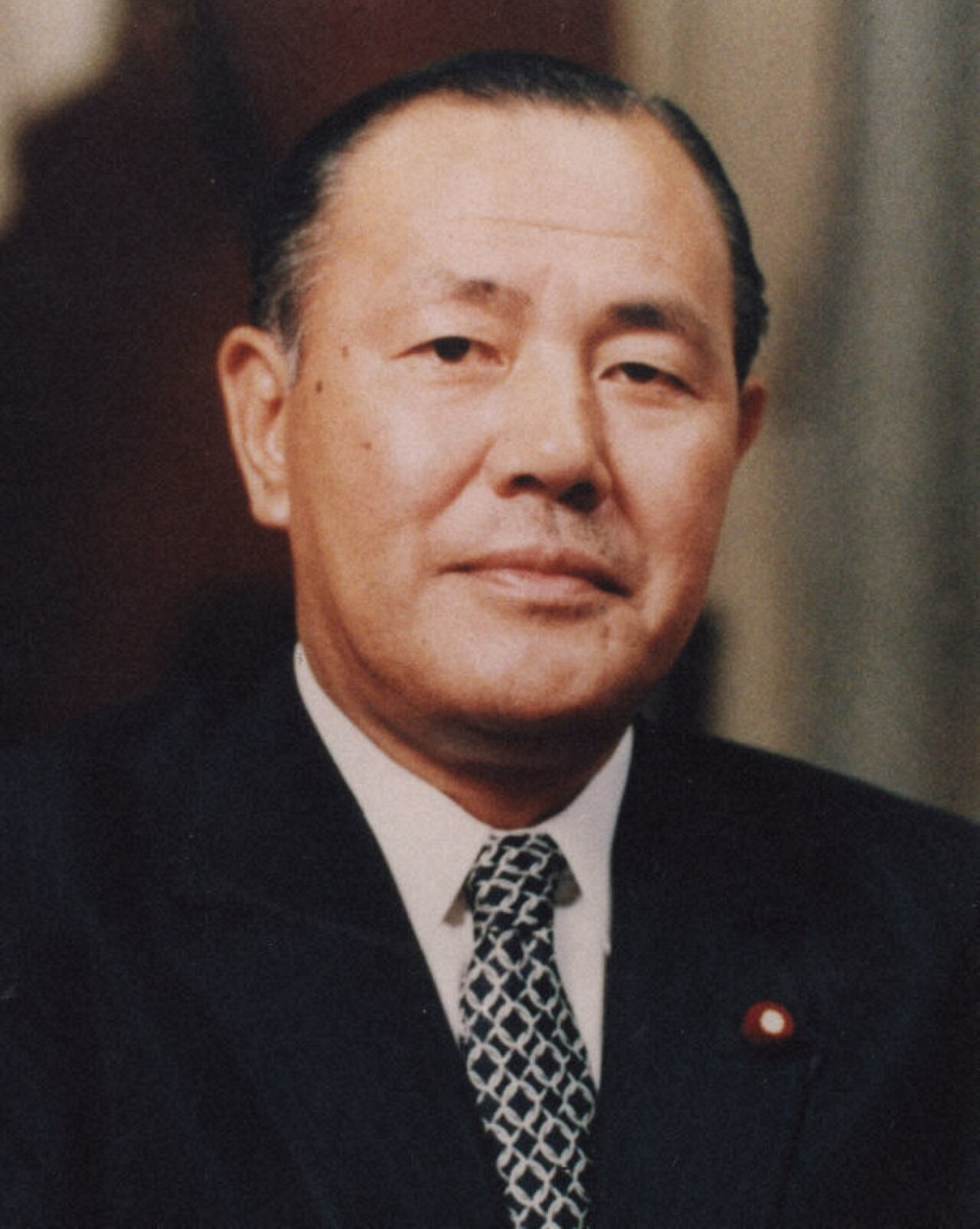
Kakuei Tanaka

The koenkai of Kakuei Tanaka (田中角栄 4 May 1918 – 16 December 1993)– Prime Minister of Japan from 1972 to 1974 – has been recognised as the one that boasted the most far-reaching influence of its kind in Japanese political history. Tanaka's Etsuzankai - literally translated into "cross the mountains of Niigata to get to Tokyo" – was based in the Third District of his hometown –Niigata Prefecture. By the 1970s, the number of people associating with Etsuzankai reached an all-time high of 98,000 members, accounting for approximately 20% of Niigata's eligible voters. Among these were very powerful figures, including the 26 out of 33 mayors of Niigata's separate municipalities, and half the number of city councils and prefectural legislature officials. The organization also ran its own publication, called the Monthly Etsuzan, whose circulation was over 50,000.

Etsuzankai was founded on June 28, 1953 in Kamo village, with the help of Seiji Tanako, Jiro Kikuta and Seihei Watanabe. One year before that, Tanaka gained a reputation among people in the northern region of Niigata almost over-night, thanks to a railway construction bestowed to the villagers. People living in other municipalities of Niigata quickly joined his koenkai and provided him with ardent support in expectance of favourable treatment in return. Tanaka was able to seize upon the opportunities and turn that into a major source of support for his political activities.

Etsuzankai financed its own structure, first and foremost, with funds from Tanaka's Tokyo-based business and political acquaintances. For example, one of Tanaka's friend – Kenji Osano – was an annual donor of 24 million yen. However, more importantly, Etsuzankai's tendency to initiate construction works attracted several firms who wished to secure construction bids. After 1965, it became common that Tanaka in return would receive 0.02% to 0.03% of a whole project expenditure as 'thank you money'. This money was then spent upon organizing activities for its members at an immense scale. It is said that Tanaka once held a trip for 11,000 people to go to a hot spring at Nukumi in Yamagata Prefecture at the cost of US$1.4 million. Etsuzankai was famed for one of its specialties, called the "pilgrimage to Meijro". This was a 3 days and 2 nights trip for members to spend time leisurely bathing and eating in Tokyo, touring the Diet building and Imperial Palace, watching musical at Asakusa and occasionally going to resorts at Enoshima, Atami and Izu. Other activities including contests, sing-a-longs and picnics.

At the same time, its financial prosperity allowed Etsuzankai to become a political organization with overwhelming power. The money that was given out at events like the births, marriages, funerals of its members subtly manipulated, suffocated or directed opinions in Niigata. In addition to that, Etsuzenkai's influence transcended party boundaries. While controlling the local LDP, the group also facilitated the election of a socialist mayor in one of Niigata's municipalities. The Asahi reported in the mid-1970s that the Etsuzankai "virtually controls… agricultural committees, popular welfare committees, election management committees". This thorough penetration of Tanaka's koenkai into all important facets of Niigata's people's lives propelled him into becoming the father figure of the district. After his arrest in 1976 on corruption charges, many of Niigata's residents still expressed deep respect towards him. By 1983, many years after the scandal, 75% of the people in Niigata maintained that the prefecture had benefited from Tanaka's leadership, while another 65% thought that he was indispensable to their future welfare.

=== Aichi Kiichi ===
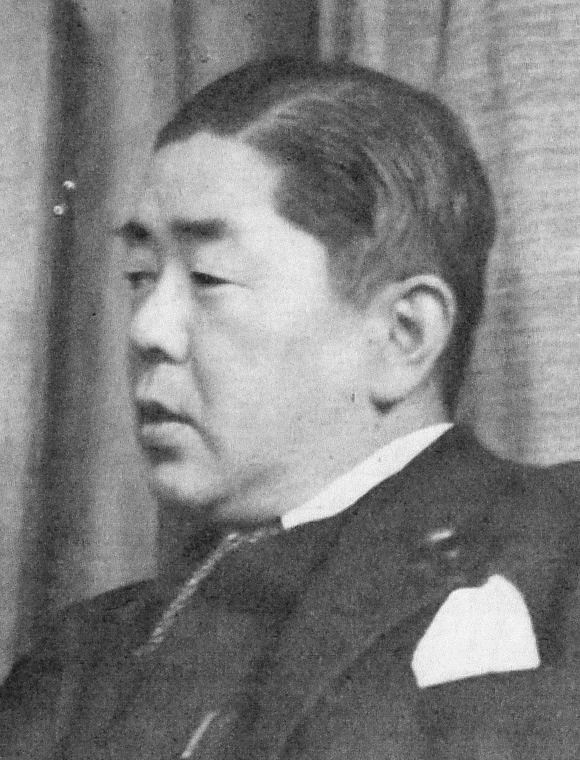
Aichi Kiichi

Aichi Kiichi (愛知 揆一 10 October 1907 – 23 November 1973) served as Japan's vice minister of Ministry of Finance in 1953 and won a Lower House seat for Miyagi First District in 1955. He had also spent some time as a high-ranking officer in the Ministry of Justice, Home Affairs, International Trade & Industry as well as the Ministry of Education. The New York Times claims Aichi Kiichi was one of the key figures who "helped … Japan through her trying but economically triumphant postwar period".

Winning a seat in the Lower House was particularly challenging. Thus, Aichi's secretary, Muto Yoichi, and Aichi's wife found the need of initiating a strong support group – or koenkai - for Aichi. In the summer of 1955, a series of talk sessions in the morning, speeches in the afternoon and dinner and alcohol at night were held for 45 days on end to gather interests from the people. Former classmates of Aichi in High School were elected to leaders of local koenkai, as youth groups, women's political groups and women's support groups were established. At the same time, taking advantage of being vice minister of MOF, Aichi started mobilizing for financial support from local financial institutions in Tokyo, including Shichijushishi Bank and Tokuyo Bank.

As the numbers of staff and volunteers for Aichi-kai increased, gatherings at local levels were held at a more frequent rate, sometimes up to 10 times a day. Aichi's koenkai activities were highlighted with more festivity at times, when a bicycle parade or gathering of 10,000 people in Sendai (Miyagi Prefecture's biggest city) would be organized.

However, the case of Aichi Kiichi's koenkai gives evidence to what has been contended as a tradition of Japanese politics: hereditary politics. After Aichi's death in 1973, his son-in-law Aichi Kazuo (愛知 和男, born 20 July 1937) succeeded the organization that has been developed by his father. Despite the initial faltering and disintegration, Kazuo was able to gather more votes than his father-in-law in his day, using the existing organization. Aichi-kai's influence over rural agriculture co-ops, or nokyo, small businesses associations of barbers, public baths, and restaurants remained significant. These were people who started out supporting his father, and their sense of loyalty was then dedicated to Achi's son-in-law. Supporters saw him as a respectable "family man", who went to elite school (Hibiya High School and Tokyo University) and who had a "charming wife and good children".

However, necessary changes to Aichi-kai were made to adapt to the new urban landscape of Sendai. First of all, the hierarchical element in structuring koenkai was abandoned and replaced with several sub-organizations of different sizes existing on equal terms. More importantly, the theme that dominated Aichi-kai's activities was no longer drinking, singing and small talk, but instead it was a more urban-type, friendly relationship between the candidate and supporters. Finally, the two-way function that traditionally defined koenkai did not apply to Kazuo's support group. Membership of the new Aichi-kai was seen as something desired, and people did not participate simply in exchange for benefits.

As a result, shortly before the electoral reforms in 1994, Kazuo's koenkai boasted between 170,000 and 180,000 members. 2/3 of this figure was transformed into actual votes for Aichi Kazuo.

=== Takeshita Noboru ===
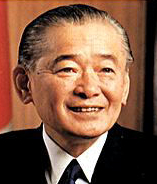
Takeshita Noboru

Takeshita Noboru (竹下 登, 26 February 1924 – 19 June 2000) was an LDP career politician and the 74th Prime Minister of Japan between 1987 and 1989. Throughout his life in politics, Takeshita was known for the large behind-the-scenes influence he held over Japanese politics, leading to him being informally bestowed the mantle of the ‘last shadow shogun'. Takeshita's political base was founded in Shimane Prefecture, where he held a seat in the House of Representatives between 1958 and 2000. In total, Takeshita was consecutively re-elected to this seat fourteen times.

Over his political life, Takeshita established a large koenkai, which was primarily made-up of local business owners and local government workers, both of which contributed to strength of his local support group. Due to the huge support Takeshita enjoyed as a result of his koenkai, his electoral district in Shimane came to be known as ‘Takeshita Kingdom'. Despite being embroiled in many political scandals, related to insider trading and corruption (for which he was never charged), Takeshita's immense local support never waned. In return for this unwavering support, Takeshita dedicated much of his time and effort to developing his local constituency. As a result, under Takeshita's watch, his Shimane constituency was host to many "excessively huge public works projects", and throughout the 1990s Takeshita's electoral district received the highest amount of public investment per capita in the whole of Japan.

Takeshita's health declined considerably in early 2000, leading to him stepping down from his role in Shimane. He died two months later, just two days before the 2000 general election at which he had initially intended to run for an unprecedented 15th time.

=== Suzuki Zenko ===
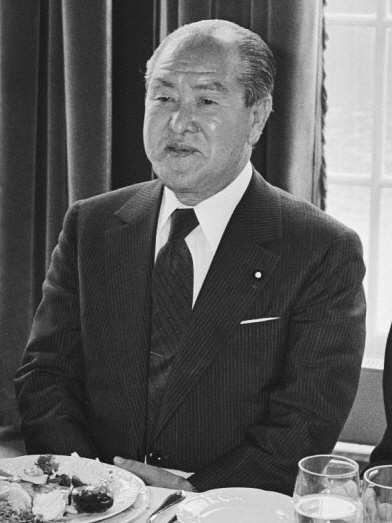
Suzuki Zenkō

Suzuki Zenkō (鈴木 善幸, 11 January 1911 – 19 July 2004) was an influential Japanese politician for the LDP. He served as the 44th Prime Minister of Japan from 17 July 1980 to 27 November 1982. He was a member of the LDP from its establishment in 1955 until his death in 2004. Suzuki was elected to his seat in Iwate Prefecture on 12 consecutive occasions until his retirement from politics in 1990.

During his time in politics, Suzuki formed a substantial koenkai in his home district. Partly in thanks to the large influence which Suzuki acquired through the various high-ranking positions he held in government, during his time in politics his electoral district received many subsidies from the government, allowing economic development to flourish in the region. Suzuki's contributions to the area are considered to be particularly responsible for the development of fisheries in the area. One notable example of the benefits Suzuki returned to his support groups in Iwate is that of Shimanokoshi, a small hamlet on the Iwate coast. The hamlet received enough subsidies for economic development, that it in the 1960s it became the first designated "fourth class fishing port" on the whole coast. Another notable beneficiary of Suzuki's work was in the town of Tanohata, whose mayor was also a member of Suzuki's koenaki (despite he himself not being a member of the LDP). During the time in which Suzuki held his seat, the town saw a rapid development of its agricultural (particularly in regards to dairy farming) and road infrastructures.

Suzuki continued to enjoy considerable support from his koenkai until his retirement in 1990. He died in 2004. Suzuki's son, Suzuki Shunichi (鈴木 俊一), now also represents the LDP in the Lower House, holding the same Iwate seat as his father.

== Significance of koenkai to LDP pre-1994 reforms ==
Under the SNTV system, each multimember district had a typical range of 3–5 seats available. Due to this, in order to capture a majority of seats in the lower house, larger parties like the LDP had to nominate more than one candidate in each district. As individual LDP members faced both intraparty and interparty competition, the koenkai played a role in easing their uncertainty and helping to ensure their election and reelection in the Diet by cultivating a personal reputation and personal vote. They could function as an electoral organisation, campaign machine and political funding body all rolled into one. Allegiance of koenkai members to a candidate is personal, parochial and particularistic, essentially identical with that between intraparty faction members and their leader. Over 90% of the LDP candidates belonged to factions and each had his own koenkai back home; for a faction to successfully promote its leader as a contender for party leadership or to retain or increase its influence over the distribution of cabinet, party and parliamentary posts according to the shifting current of coalition formation after each presidential election, it had to increase the number of mass party members whose primary-election behaviour it could control. Because of this, candidates sought to increase the membership of their respective koenkai registered as party members.

Prior to the 1994 elections, there were numerous campaign regulations that severely limited the ways candidates could effectively reach voters. Candidates and campaign workers were not allowed to canvass voters door to door, or give cash, food, or drink to voters. Campaigns could only create officially approved campaign posters that could only be placed in publicly provided and designated locations. Campaigns could produce only two types of brochures and the total number that may be distributed is limited by regulation. Direct mailings to voters were limited to an officially approved postcard that was sent at government's expense to a limited number of voters. Media advertisements by candidates, when allowed, were strictly limited to a few government-approved settings in which all candidates followed identical regulations concerning content and format. The number of campaign offices and cars and the amount of expenditures on campaign workers were also closely restricted or regulated by the government.

One way to deal with this was through the use of organisations such as the koenkai. A campaign going door to door could justify its activities by using an organization's list of members, which might have been obtained from a political ally, an affiliated support group of even self-constructed, thus allowing it to knock on tens of thousands of doors in a district because it was considered part of an organization's activities and not a campaign visit. While politicians without these lists could still go door to door introducing themselves and soliciting people to join their support organization, they ran the risk of being apprehended because they have no organizational reason or personal introduction to justify this action. Hence, the use of the list was much safer.

Organizations further helped candidates by allowing them to evade restrictions placed on campaign literature, offices and expenditures. Candidates could set up the functional equivalent of multiple campaign offices by using those of a koenkai, through which campaign information could be distributed via publications and newsletters. During a campaign, organizations could also provide a large number of "volunteers" to a campaign, making it even more efficient.

== Effects of 1994 electoral reforms ==
In January 1994, the Japanese Diet passed a series of major electoral reform laws. These reforms amended the system used to elect its Lower House (the House of Representatives) and also restructured campaign finance practices. This involved the replacement of the previous single non-transferable vote (SNTV) electoral system with a mixed member majoritarian (MMM) electoral system. As a result, multimember districts were replaced with single-member districts, removing what was considered one of the greatest facilitators of koenkai.

Prior to the 1994 reforms in Japan, koenkai had played a central role in how politicians built and maintained their reputations. They were therefore seen as an indispensable tool for many Japanese politicians with regards to securing personal votes (votes based on a politician's character rather than based on policy). This is widely accepted as a symptom of the SNTV electoral system, which had been practiced in Japan between 1947 and 1994. A key characteristic of SNTV electoral systems is that each individual political party will typically field multiple candidates for the same political district seat. As a result, intra-party candidate rivalry became the norm in Japan under the SNTV system, forcing candidates to differentiate themselves on factors external to political policy.

The reforms were originally expected to decrease the importance of the koenkai because the possibility of intraparty competition has been eliminated at the election stage, implying that LDP politicians could compete against policies articulated by other parties' candidates without competing against other members of their own party at the same time. However, while there appears to be a slow decline, koenkai nevertheless remain quite a prominent feature of the electoral landscape, continuing to affect the relationship between party leaders and backbenchers. Despite the removal of multimember districts, which encouraged the formation of koenkai, the reforms did not succeed in entirely eliminating the need for koenkai. Due to the high level of proportional representation in Japanese politics, it became difficult to establish the small-constituency system which the reforms had aimed to place heavy emphasis on. Instead of a system consisting of small constituencies, governed by stable single-party administrations, the reforms ended up producing ineffective and unstable coalition governments. As a result, political parties as entities themselves lost credibility, both with the public and politicians themselves. Therefore, politicians continued to campaign based on their own personal merits, with the backing of their koenkai, as opposed to on the merits of their political party.

== Present times ==
While koenkai are still regarded as important in Japanese politics, they have nevertheless declined from their peak of strength. The election reforms did play a part in this, though less so than expected. Another explanation is that though politicians remained as interested in developing koenkai as they were previously, voters are no longer interested in joining one. While it is possible that politicians are increasingly turning to other means of reaching out to voters such as through television, given that not every politician can become a TV star and garner votes simply through name recognition, it is more likely for a politician to remain reliant on their koenkai, or simultaneously seek television fame and a strong koenkai. At the same time, however, it would be wrong to say that television did not contribute at all.

The real influence of television manifests in the resulting increasing importance of the party label. And it is here that the rise of the influence of television presents a challenge for explanations based on the electoral system, although in important ways the two phenomena are intertwined. In other words, electoral reform alone might not have driven politicians to diminish their investment in kōenkai and rely on the party label, but electoral reform combined with the rise of television seems to have made the party label a more reliable asset for politicians and thus led to the diminishment of koenkai. In the case of Yoshinori Ohno's 2003 election, in an electoral district of 220,000, the LDP had only a few thousand members, so when the LDP prefectural organization was pressed to sign up new members it had to turn to the koenkai of its politicians. Organizationally, the LDP remains weak; to repeat Ohno's words, "the party's shadow is faint on the ground".

The 2005 election offers lessons about the balance between the koenkai and the party label. Prime Minister Junichiro Koizumi dissolved the House of Representatives after his postal privatization bill did not pass the House of Councillors, and in the subsequent election stripped "rebel" Diet leaders who had voted against the bill of their party endorsement, as well as dispatching "assassin" (shikyaku) candidates from the party to contest the districts of the rebels. Most of the rebels lost, some won, and the LDP as a whole achieved its greatest electoral victory ever, showing that koenkai alone are no longer enough to reliably get a Diet member elected, although it is still possible for strong politicians to win with their koenkai alone. At the same time, without the koenkai none of the rebels could have imagined victory at all, as seen by how even under such near-worst-case conditions, koenkai won fifteen of the battles.

Although some candidates now choose to rely on the party label, many still value the personal vote and koenkai, to the point that even politicians running for their first election in a SMD have chosen to invest substantial resources in building a koenkai. Furthermore, the LDP has adopted a "best loser" provision to rank PR candidates based on the percentage of the winner's vote that they obtain, meaning a candidate who lost narrowly in one district will be ranked ahead of another candidate who lost overwhelmingly in another district, giving all LDP Diet members the incentive to cultivate their own koenkai, to act as a victory assurance and a flexible means of allowing non-party supporters to register their approval of a particular politician. Ohno once remarked, "People support me as a candidate and not as a party representative; people are moved by personal connections in Japan…. Look at the PR vote in Kagawa. My vote is 90,000 and the LDP PR vote is 60,000 in this district. I get the extra 30,000 votes by showing my face, talking to people, and going to meetings". Another Diet member also complained, "My area in [my district] is a very difficult area for the LDP. The DPJ is very strong there. Even in the last election [2005], I won only narrowly despite the LDP landslide. The LDP organization is practically nonexistent. I've had to work hard to develop a koenkai, but I know that I need to do it. I cannot rely only on the party label and the party organization to win."

== Controversies ==
Koenkai have been associated with instances of corruption. This is because of the high costs needed to maintain koenkai (which usually amount to millions of USD per year). Therefore, politicians are on many occasions willing and happy to join forces with others who provide economic support, take bribes for favours and so on.

=== Yukio Hatoyama ===
In 2009, the then DPJ Prime Minister Yukio Hatoyama was engulfed in a funding scandal, which was partly a result of the huge expenses needed to run koenkai. Hatoyama's premiership was placed under large pressure when it emerged that he had received large sums of undeclared political donations. Most famously, it emerged that Hatoyama's mother, Yasuko, heiress to Bridgestone Tyres Co., had contributed ¥900 million in undeclared donations between 2004 and 2008. Whilst Hatoyama survived the scandal and remained in office, his credibility was left damaged by the scandal.

=== Ichirō Ozawa ===
In 2009, the DPJ president Ichirō Ozawa was forced to resign as party leader after becoming embroiled in a fundraising scandal, related to the alleged false reporting of land purchases and loans to his koenkai made between 2004 and 2005. Whilst Ozawa denied any involvement from him or his funding group, two of his aides were formally convicted and jailed for their involvement in the scandal. In 2011, Ozawa went on trial in Tokyo and was charged with breaking political fundraising laws. However, in April 2012, Ozawa was formally acquitted.

=== Recruit scandal ===
The Recruit scandal was an insider-trading and corruption scandal which engulfed the LDP government in 1988. It emerged that the Tokyo-based company Recruit Holdings Co., Ltd. had been making donations to the koenkai of prominent LDP politicians, many of whom had also bought shares in the company. Amongst those caught up in the scandal was former LDP Prime Minister Yasuhiro Nakasone. It emerged that Recruit had donated 112 million yen to Nakasone's koenakai throughout the 1980s, whilst his aides had purchased 29,000 shares in Recruit in 1984.

== Examples from other countries ==
Whilst koenkai is a distinctly Japanese term, the form of clientelism which it is characterised by is not unique to Japan. Members of political systems in countries around the world have also been found to employ similar clientelistic tactics, in order to garner support for votes.

=== Italy ===
Christian Democracy (Italian: Democrazia Italiana, DC) was a Christian democratic centrist political party in Italy. It employed clientelism as a means to cement the party's domination of Italian politics across a 50-year span from 1944 to 1994. Similar to the tactics found in Japanese koenkai, they used clientelistic policies in order to gain support and insight into public opinion, which then influenced public policies.

=== Mexico ===
The centrist Mexican political party Institutional Revolutionary Party (Spanish: Partido Revolucionario Institucional, PRI) has in the past employed clientelistic tactics, similar to those found in Japan. During the party's rule of Mexico from 1929 to 2000, the party established a network of local civil and political organisations which were loyal to the party. Through this, political powers and benefits, and state resources were predominantly directed to regions in which the party had large support bases.

== See also ==
- Politics of Japan
- Electoral System
- Index of Japan-related articles
- Post-occupation Japan
- Prefectures of Japan
- Provinces of Japan
- Law of Japan
- Government of Japan
- Constitution
- Flawed democracy
- List of political parties in Japan
- Client politics
- Cronyism
- Pork barrel
- Neopatrimonialism
- Political corruption
- Political machine
