= Government-business relations in Japan =

Government-business relations are conducted in many ways and through numerous channels in Japan. The most important conduits in the postwar period are the economic ministries: the Ministry of Finance and the Ministry of Economy, Trade and Industry (METI, formerly the Ministry of International Trade and Industry, known as MITI). The Ministry of Finance has operational responsibilities for all fiscal affairs, including the preparation of the national budget. It initiates fiscal policies and, through its indirect control over the Bank of Japan, the central bank, is responsible for monetary policy as well. The Ministry of Finance allocates public investment, formulates tax policies, collected taxes, and regulates foreign exchange.

== The Ministries ==
- The Ministry of Finance establishes low interest rates and, by thus reducing the cost of investment funds to corporations, promotes industrial expansion.
- METI is responsible for the regulation of production and the distribution of goods and services. It is the "steward" of the Japanese economy, developing plans concerning the structure of Japanese industry. The former MITI had several special functions: controlling Japan's foreign trade and supervising international commerce; ensuring the smooth flow of goods in the national economy; promoting the development of manufacturing, mining, and distribution industries; and supervising the procurement of a reliable supply of raw materials and energy resources.
- The Ministry of Land, Infrastructure and Transport is responsible for oversight of all land, sea, and air transport. It is charged with supervising all construction in Japan and Japanese-supported construction abroad. Its responsibilities also include land acquisition for public use and environmental protection as it relates to construction.
- The Ministry of Health, Labour and Welfare is responsible for supervising and coordinating all health and welfare services.
- The former Ministry of Posts and Telecommunications was responsible for the postal service and electronic communications, functions now filled by Japan Post and Nippon Telegraph and Telephone and their private competitors.

== Japanese market economy model ==
Japan's market economy model shapes the relationship between government and business. There is debate among scholars on how to classify Japan's market economy and welfare state model. Some argue that the focuses of Japan's government, businesses, and laborers are solely oriented towards increasing economic productivity. This is considered the productivist or developmental welfare capitalism model. Institutional features in Japan pointing towards this model include the cooperation between MITI and businesses in directing the Japanese economy towards high productivity goals. Labor subordination is another aspect of this model that allows the Japanese government to focus solely on economic development rather than the development of social programs.

The other market economy and welfare state model that Japan is argued to fit under is the hybrid model. The hybrid model is a combination of liberal and cooperative welfare states. Similar to other liberal market economies such as the United States, Japan has very low levels of welfare spending. However, unlike in other liberal economies, the Japanese government plays a direct role in coordinating the actions of Japanese businesses through the use of bureaucracy. MITI is responsible for drafting large-scope economic plans that include picking the next winning and losing industry sectors that the Japanese government should invest in or support. This aspect of Japan's market economy is similar to the cooperation between businesses and government. Another aspect of the Japanese market economy that follows the cooperative model is the role of family values. Japanese values of meritocracy and hard work mirror the labor conditions in the Japanese economy. However, unlike cooperative market economies that draw their values from Christian thought, Japanese market values derive themselves from Confucianism. These parallel distinctions between liberal and cooperative market economies are why scholars argue that Japan fits a hybrid market economy model.

== Attitudes toward government direction ==
Japanese attitudes towards government have historically been shaped by Confucianism. Japan often has been defined as a Confucian country, but one in which loyalty is more important than benevolence. Leadership stemmed from the government and authority in general, and business looked to government for guidance. These attitudes, coupled with the view of the nation as a family, allowed government to influence business, and businesses worked hard not only for their own profits but also for national well-being. There was a national consensus that Japan must be an economic power and that the duty of all Japanese was to sacrifice themselves for this national goal. Thus, the relationship between government and business was as collaborators rather than as mutually suspicious adversaries.

== Corporate organizations ==
Links between the corporate world and government in Japan were maintained through three national organizations: the Federation of Economic Organizations (Keizai Dantai Rengokai—Keidanren), established in 1946; the Japan Association of Corporate Executives (Keizai Dōyukai), established in 1946; and the Japan Federation of Employers Association (Nihon Keieishadantai Renmei—Nikkeiren), established in 1948. Keidanren is considered the most important. Its membership includes 750 of the largest corporations and 110 manufacturers' associations. Its Tokyo headquarters serves as a kind of "nerve center" for the country's most important enterprises, and it works closely with the powerful Ministry of International Trade and Industry (MITI). There is evidence, however, suggesting that the federation's power is not what it had been, partly because major corporations, which had amassed huge amounts of money by the late 1980s, are increasingly capable of operating without its assistance.

Nikkeiren was concerned largely with labor-management relations and with organizing a united business front to negotiate with labor unions on wage demands during the annual "Spring Struggle". The Keizai Dōyukai, composed of younger and more liberal business leaders, assigned itself the role of promoting business's social responsibilities. Whereas Keidanren and Nikkeiren were "peak organizations", whose members themselves were associations, members of the Keizai Dōyukai were individual business leaders (see Labor unions in Japan).

Because of financial support from corporations, business interest groups were generally more independent of political parties than other groups. Both Keidanren and the Keizai Dōyukai, for example, indicated a willingness to talk with the Japan Socialist Party in the wake of the political scandals of 1988-89 and also suggested that the LDP might form a coalition government with an opposition party. Yet through an organization called the People's Politics Association (Kokumin Seiji Kyokai), they and other top business groups provided the Liberal Democratic Party (LDP) with its largest source of party funding.

== Small business ==
Japan's streets are lined with small shops, grocery stores, restaurants, and coffeehouses. Although supermarkets and large discount department stores are more common than in the 1980s, the political muscle of small business associations was reflected in the success with which they blocked the nationalization of the country's distribution system. The Large-Scale Retail Store Law of 1973, amended in 1978, made it very difficult in the late 1980s for either Japanese or foreign retailers to establish large, economically efficient outlets in local communities.

Many light industrial goods, such as toys, footwear, pencils, and kitchen utensils, were still manufactured by small local companies rather than imported from the Republic of Korea, Taiwan, or Hong Kong. Traditional handicrafts, such as pottery, silk weaving, and lacquerware, produced using centuries-old methods in small workshops, flourished in every part of the country. Apart from protectionism of the "non-tariff barrier" variety, the government ensured the economic viability of small enterprises through lenient tax policies and access to credit on especially favorable terms.

Major associations representing small and medium-sized enterprises included the generally pro-LDP Japan Chamber of Commerce and Industry (Nihon Shoko Kaigisho, or Nissho for short), which was established in 1922 but whose origins are traced to the establishment of the Tokyo Chamber of Commerce and Industry in 1878, the National Central Association of Medium and Small Enterprise Associations, the Japan League of Medium and Small Enterprise Organizations, and the Japanese Communist Party-sponsored Democratic Merchants and Manufacturers Association.

Although small enterprises in services and manufacturing preserved cultural traditions and enlivened urban areas, a major motivation for government nurturing of small business was social welfare. In Calder's words, "Much of small business, particularly in the distribution sector, serves as a labor reservoir. Its inefficiencies help absorb surplus workers who would be unemployed if distribution, services, and traditional manufacturing were uniformly as efficient as the highly competitive and modernized export sectors.

Lately, however, government relations agencies such as GR Japan and ShinNihon Public Affairs have started to appear also in Japan, run by former diplomats, members of parliament, and civil servants.

== See also ==
- Economy of Japan
- Industrial policy of Japan
- Amakudari: retired bureaucrats joining the ranks of Japanese companies
