= Masae Ido =

Japanese politician

- 井戸 正枝
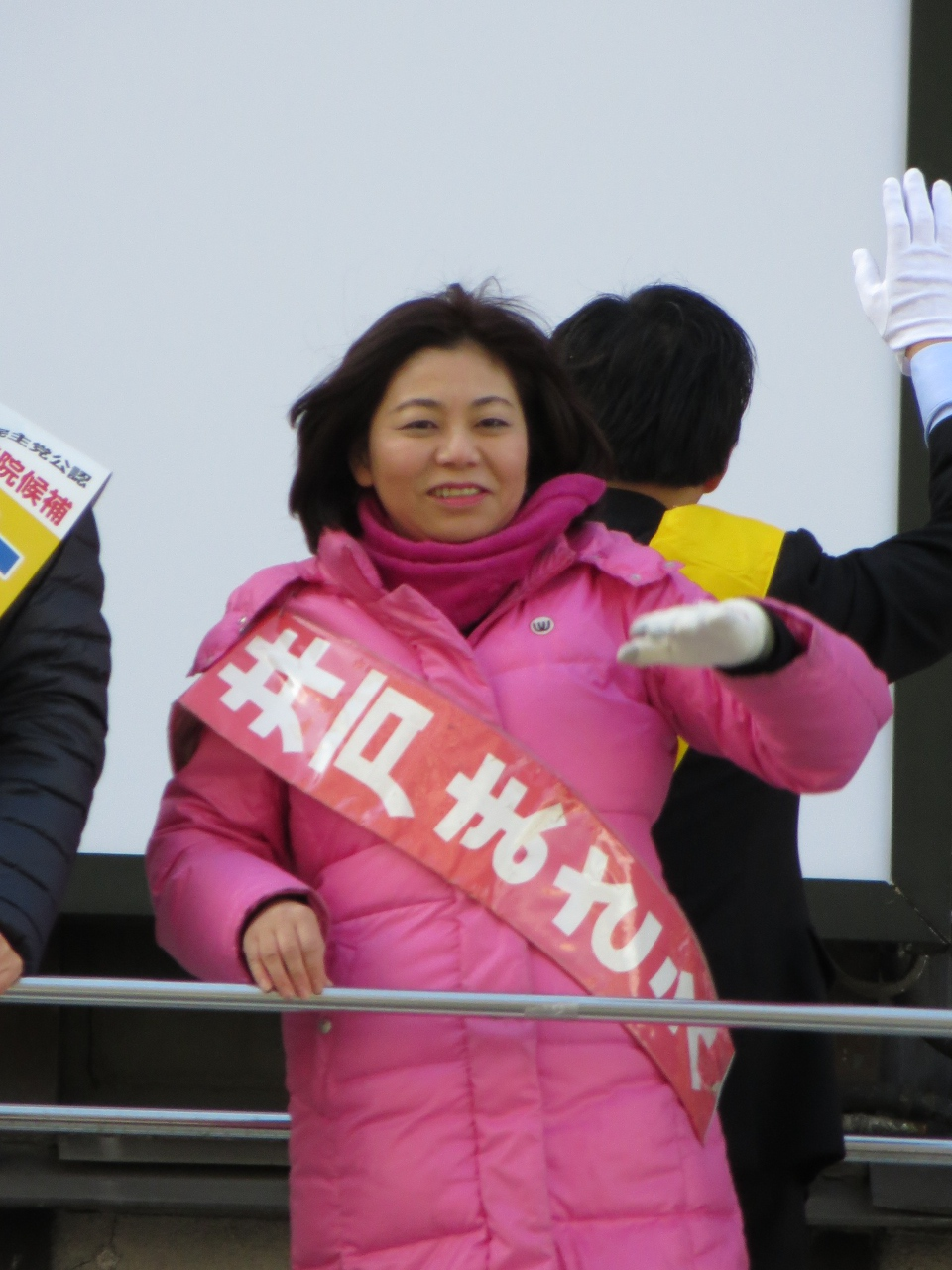
- Ido in 2012

Member of the House of Representatives
- Incumbent
- Assumed office 9 February 2026
- Constituency: Tokyo PR
- In office 30 August 2009 – 16 November 2012
- Preceded by: Masahito Moriyama
- Succeeded by: Masahito Moriyama
- Constituency: Hyōgo 1st

Member of the Hyōgo Prefectural Assembly
- In office July 2005 – 31 July 2009
- Constituency: Higashinada

Personal details
- Born: 13 December 1965 (age 60) Masae Ogata; Sendai, Miyagi, Japan
- Party: DPP (since 2024)
- Other political affiliations: Independent (2003–2005); DPJ (2005–2016); DP (2016–2017); CDP (2017–2024)
- Spouses: Katsumata Koichiro (m. 1990; div. 2002); Tomoki Ido (m. 2002)
- Children: 5
- Education: Tokyo Woman's Christian University
- Occupation: Journalist

Masae Ido (井戸 正枝, Ido Masae; born Masae Ogata; 13 December 1965) is a Japanese politician who is a member of the House of Representatives. She is a member of the Democratic Party For the People. She is a former member of the Hyōgo Prefectural Assembly.

== Early life ==
Ido was born in Sendai, Miyagi. After graduating from Sendai Municipal Tōka Junior High School and Miyagi Prefectural Second Girls’ High School, she graduated from the Department of History, Faculty of Arts and Sciences of Tokyo Woman’s Christian University in 1988 and completed the doctoral program at its graduate school, holding a PhD in Lifelong Human Sciences.

Ido became a student of the Matsushita Institute of Government and Management and became a part of its 9th class. Her classmates at the time included Kenya Akiba, Koichiro Ichimura, Hironao Honda, and Hirokazu Matsuno.

In 1990, Ido joined Toyo Keizai and worked in data editing, she then became active as an economic journalist under the pen name “Akino Ogata.”

Ido later married Katsumata Koichiro, a member of the 8th class of the Matsushita, and lived with him in Kanagawa Prefecture. The couple formally divorced in March 2002. In November 2002, she married her current husband, Tomoki Ido, and gave birth to a son. However, because the child was born 265 days after her divorce from her previous husband, the case fell under the Civil Code’s Article 772 “300-day rule,” which presumes a child born within 300 days of divorce to be the former husband’s. The Ashiya City office therefore requested that she submit a birth registration listing her ex-husband as the father. She refused, and the child was temporarily left without a family registry entry. In response, she filed a lawsuit in 2003 at the Kobe District Court (Amagasaki branch) seeking compulsory recognition of paternity by her current husband. She won the case in November of that year.

== Political career ==
Ido ran as an independent candidate in the Ashiya constituency in the 2003 Hyōgo Prefectural Assembly election but was defeated. In 2005, she ran in a by-election for the Hyōgo Prefectural Assembly from the Higashinada constituency as a Democratic Party of Japan (DPJ)–endorsed candidate and was elected. She won a full term in the 2007 election.

On July 31, 2009, Ido resigned from the Hyōgo Prefectural Assembly to run in the 2009 general election from Hyōgo 1st district and was elected to the House of Representatives, defeating incumbent Masahito Moriyama from the Liberal Democratic Party (LDP).

In the September 2010 DPJ leadership election, Ido was one of the 20 National Diet members that nominated Naoto Kan. Kan would go on to win the election and become Prime Minister. Following Kan's resignation a year later, Ido nominated Seiji Maehara in the 2011 DPJ leadership election, but Maehara would lose the election to Yoshihiko Noda.

Ido ran for re-election in the 2012 general election but lost to the LDP's Moriyama, the same candidate she had defeated three years earlier, though she continued to serve as head of the DPJ’s Hyōgo 1st district chapter.

In the 2014 general election, Ido ran as the DPJ's candidate in Miyagi 4th district but lost to the LDP's Shintaro Ito.

In 2015, Ido succeeded Norihiko Fujita as head of the DPJ's Tokyo 4th district chapter. When the Democratic Party (DP) succeeded the DPJ in 2016, she continued to lead its Tokyo 4th district chapter.

When DP merged into Kibō no Tō ahead of the 2017 general election, the party declined to field Ido as a candidate for Tokyo 4th, instead fielding Michiyo Namba. As a result, Ido joined the Constitutional Democratic Party (CDP) and ran in the district as its candidate, while also standing on the party’s proportional representation list for the Tokyo block. She finished second, ahead of Namba but behind the LDP’s Masaaki Taira, and did not secure a PR seat.

In the 2021 general election, Ido ran as the CDP’s candidate in Tokyo 15th district rather than Tokyo 4th, after the party agreed to yield the latter district to the Japanese Communist Party as part of their electoral cooperation arrangement. Tokyo 15th was chosen because Mito Kakizawa, an independent that caucused with the CDP in the House of Representatives, voted for the LDP's Fumio Kishida for the prime minister designation election instead of CDP leader Yukio Edano, prompting the party to field a candidate against him in his district. Ido would go on to lose the election to Kakizawa and did not secure a PR seat.

Ido left the CDP and joined the Democratic Party For the People (DPP) ahead of the 2024 general election and became the party's candidate for Tokyo 4th district. She lost to the LDP's Masaaki Taira and did not secure a PR seat. She again ran as the DPP’s candidate in Tokyo 4th district in the 2026 general election, losing to Taira in the constituency race but securing a seat through the Tokyo proportional representation block, marking her return to the National Diet after 14 years.

== Personal life ==
Drawing on her personal experience with deficiencies in the Civil Code, Ido founded the Association of Families of Unregistered Children in 2008 and became its secretary-general. She also established the nonprofit Research Group for Reform of Parent-Child Law.

In April 2018, her article “Cybozu President Aono’s ‘Separate Surnames Lawsuit’ and the Unease of Those Troubled by His Approach to Nippon Kaigi” was selected as one of the Asahi Shimbun’s “three notable pieces of the month”.
