= Hajime Ishii =

Japanese politician (1934–2022)

- 石井 一
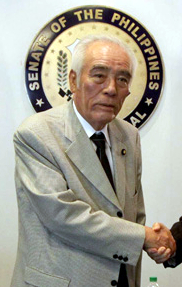
- Ishii in 2011

Minister of Home Affairs
- In office 28 April 1994 – 30 June 1994
- Prime Minister: Tsutomu Hata
- Preceded by: Kanju Satō
- Succeeded by: Hiromu Nonaka

Chairman of the National Public Safety Commission
- In office 28 April 1994 – 30 June 1994
- Prime Minister: Tsutomu Hata
- Preceded by: Kanju Satō
- Succeeded by: Hiromu Nonaka

Director-General of the National Land Agency
- In office 10 August 1989 – 28 February 1990
- Prime Minister: Toshiki Kaifu
- Preceded by: Eiji Nonaka
- Succeeded by: Moriyoshi Satō

Member of the House of Councillors
- In office 29 July 2007 – 28 July 2013
- Constituency: National PR

Member of the House of Representatives
- In office 8 July 1986 – 8 August 2005
- Preceded by: Kazuhito Nagae
- Succeeded by: Multi-member district
- Constituency: Former Hyōgo 1st (1986–1996); Hyōgo 1st (1996–2003); Kinki PR (2003–2005)
- In office 29 December 1969 – 28 November 1983
- Preceded by: Kazuo Nagae
- Succeeded by: Kazuhito Nagae
- Constituency: Former Hyōgo 1st

Personal details
- Born: 17 August 1934 Kobe, Hyōgo, Japan
- Died: 4 June 2022 (aged 87) Tokyo, Japan
- Party: Democratic (1998–2013)
- Other political affiliations: LDP (1967–1993); JRP (1993–1994); NFP (1994–1998); GGP (1998)
- Education: Konan University; University of California, Los Angeles

Hajime Ishii (石井 一, Ishii Hajime; 17 August 1934 – 4 June 2022) was a Japanese politician who served in the Diet (national legislature) for 39 years between 1969 and 2013. A native of Kobe, Hyogo, he attended Konan University as an undergraduate and University of California, Los Angeles as a graduate and received a master's degree in political science from Stanford University. During his time in the Diet he served as the head of the National Land Agency for six months in 1989–1990 and as Minister for Home Affairs for two months in 1994.

== Political career ==
Ishii was elected to the House of Representatives as a member of the Liberal Democratic Party in the December 1969 general election as one of four representatives elected by the Hyōgo 1st district, after unsuccessfully contesting the same district in the January 1967 general election. He served five consecutive terms as a representative of the district before losing his seat in the December 1983 general election, finishing sixth in a contest for five seats and being replaced by Kazuhito Nagae of the Democratic Socialist Party.

Ishii was returned to the House of Representatives in the July 1986 general election, gaining the most votes in the Hyogo 1st district and regaining his seat from Nagae. Upon returning to the House he served three consecutive terms as one of five members for the Hyogo 1st district; he retained his seat at the July 1993 general election after leaving the Liberal Democratic Party and joining the Japan Renewal Party earlier that year. 1994 electoral reforms abolished the multi-member districts and replaced them with smaller single-member districts. In the same year the Renewal Party merged with other parties to form the New Frontier Party. Ishii won the first election in the new Hyogo 1st district at the October 1996 general election as a member of the Frontier Party. In 1998 he joined the short-lived Kokumin no Koe ("People's Voice") and Good Governance parties, which merged into the Democratic Party of Japan. Ishii retained the Hyogo 1st district seat at the June 2000 general election as a DPJ candidate. At the November 2003 general election Ishii was defeated by the LDP's Keisuke Sunada, the younger cousin of Shigetami Sunada with whom Ishii served five of his terms as representative of the old Hyogo 1st district. Despite the loss Ishii was able to retain a seat in the House as a member for the Kinki proportional representation block. At the September 2005 general election Ishii lost to the LDP's Masahito Moriyama and was also unsuccessful in gaining a PR seat. Ishii contested the July 2007 election for the House of Councillors, winning one of 48 seats in the national proportional representation block. He served one term before losing his seat in the July 2013 election.

== Opposition to Soka Gakkai and the New Komeito Party ==
According to the Democratic Party of Japan official website, during a 15 October 2008 meeting of the House of Councillors Budget Committee meeting, Ishii accused the opposing New Komeito Party of "operating in the shadows" and that he believed that the Nichiren Buddhist organization Soka Gakkai, who founded the Komeitō party in 1954, was "in charge of the election campaign" and was "using its facilities as part of the campaign machine". Ishii said the situation created a great problem for democracy in Japan and invited three former Komeito party members and Soka Gakkai Honorary President Daisaku Ikeda for an intensive deliberation on issue of politics.
