= Tokyo 4th district =

Parliamentary constituency for the Japanese House of Representatives

Tokyo 4th District
- Parliamentary constituency for the Japanese House of Representatives
- Numbered map of inner Tokyo single-member districts
- Prefecture: Tokyo
- Proportional District: Tokyo
- Electorate: 425,428 (2022)
- Major settlements: Kamata, Ōmori, Haneda

Current constituency
- Created: 1994
- Party: LDP
- Representative: Masaaki Taira
- Tokyo special Wards: Much of Ōta

Tokyo 4th district (東京都第4区 Tōkyō-to dai 4-ku) is a single-member constituency of the House of Representatives, the lower house of the national Diet of Japan. It is located in southern Tokyo city and consists of much of Ōta Ward (Kamata, Ōmori, Haneda.) The seat is held by Masaaki Taira, a member of the Liberal Democratic Party since 2012.

As of September 2022, 425,428 voters were registered in the district.

== List of representatives ==
Representatives	Party	Dates	Notes
Shoukei Arai	Independent	1996–1998	Redistricted from the former 2nd district. Died in office.
Kensaku Morita	LDP	1998–2000	
Kensaku Morita	Independent	2000	Re-elected in 2000.
Kensaku Morita	LDP	2000–2003	Did not run for re-election.
Kazuyoshi Nakanishi	LDP	2003–2005	Resigned mid-term.
Masaaki Taira	LDP	2005–2009	Re-elected in the Tokyo PR block.
Fujita Norihiko	DPJ	2009–2012	Lost re-election.
Masaaki Taira	LDP	2012– present	Re-elected in 2014, 2017, 2021, 2024, 2026 Minister for Digital Transformation (2024–2025)

== Election results ==
2026 Japanese general election
Party	Candidate	Votes	%	±%
LDP	Masaaki Taira (Incumbent) (Endorsed by Ishin)	114,054	49.4	▲9.18
DPP	Masae Ido (Won PR seat)	55,610	24.1	▲0.08
Sanseitō	Etsuko Shima	31,577	13.7	▲8.06
JCP	Tomoyuki Tanigawa	29,667	12.8	▼2.45
Turnout		230,908	56.44	▲5.74

2024 Japanese general election
Party	Candidate	Votes	%	±%
LDP	Masaaki Taira (Incumbent) (Endorsed by Komeito)	86,773	40.22	▼11.28
DPP	Masae Ido	51,810	24.02	New
JCP	Tomoyuki Tanigawa	32,909	15.25	▼9.65
Ishin	Masatoshi Ishikawa	32,063	14.86	▼8.74
Sanseitō	Yūta Shiodera	12,176	5.64	New
Turnout		215,731	50.7	▼3.7

2021 Japanese general election
Party	Candidate	Votes	%	±%
LDP	Masaaki Taira (Incumbent) (Endorsed by Komeito)	128,708	51.5	▲0.7
JCP	Tomoyuki Tanigawa	62,286	24.9	▲13.6
Ishin	Hayashi Tomoko	58,891	23.6	New
Turnout		474,029	54.4	▲3.7
LDP hold				

2017 Japanese general election
Party	Candidate	Votes	%	±%
LDP	Masaaki Taira (Incumbent) (Endorsed by Komeito)	115,239	50.8	▲0.5
CDP	Masae Ido	53,480	23.3	New
Kibō no Tō	Michiyo Namba	35,352	15.4	New
JCP	Kohei Aoyama	26,037	11.3	▼6.6
Turnout		466,486	50.7	▼1.5
LDP hold				

2014 Japanese general election
Party	Candidate	Votes	%	±%
LDP	Masaaki Taira (Incumbent) (Endorsed by Komeito)	109,377	50.3	▲10.9
Democratic	Fujita Norihiko (Endorsed by Japan Innovation Party)	48,861	22.5	▲5.2
JCP	Junpei Yamamoto	38,925	17.9	▲8.1
Japanese Kokoro	Hirekazu Inubushi	20,108	18.4	New
Turnout		432,784	52.3	▼7.7
LDP hold				

2012 Japanese general election
Party	Candidate	Votes	%	±%
LDP	Masaaki Taira (Endorsed by Komeito)	96,810	39.4	▲1.9
Restoration	Hirekazu Inubushi	44,999	18.3	New
Democratic	Fujita Norihiko (Incumbent) (Endorsed by People's New Party)	42,424	17.3	▼20.3
Your	Masashi Hirose	34,902	14.2	New
JCP	Junpei Yamamoto	24,167	9.8	▲0.9
Euthanasia party	Hidemitsu Sano	2,603	1.1	New
Turnout		427,018	60.0	▼4.2
LDP gain from Democratic				

2009 Japanese general election
Party	Candidate	Votes	%	±%
Democratic	Fujita Norihiko	100,067	37.5	▲3.8
LDP	Masaaki Taira (Incumbent) (Won PR seat) (Endorsed by Komeito)	93,583	35.1	▼11.6
Independent	Noboru Usami	46,107	17.3	New
JCP	Kaname Shibuya	23,622	8.9	▼0.9
Happiness Realization	Kikue Shimokawa	3,323	1.3	New
Turnout		426,496	64.2	▲0.3
Democratic gain from LDP				

2005 Japanese general election
Party	Candidate	Votes	%	±%
LDP	Masaaki Taira (Incumbent)	119,812	46.7	▲5.3
Democratic	Usami Noboru	86,354	33.7	▼1.9
JCP	Fuminori Sato	25,077	9.8	▼1.1
Independent	Kazuyoshi Nakanishi	19,955	7.8	New
Independent	Sato Hiromi	5,313	2.1	New
Turnout		N/A	63.9	▲4.0
LDP hold				

2003 Japanese general election
Party	Candidate	Votes	%	±%
LDP	Kazuyoshi Nakanishi	90,693	41.4	▲3.0
Democratic	Usami Noboru (Won PR seat)	77,953	35.6	▲15.0
New Conservative	Eriko Yamatani	26,707	12.2	New
JCP	Tomio Yamaguchi (Won PR seat)	23,942	10.9	▼4.2
Turnout		N/A	59.9	▼2.6
LDP hold				

2000 Japanese general election
Party	Candidate	Votes	%	±%
Independent	Kensaku Morita (Incumbent)	92,711	38.4	▲4.0
Komeito	Otohiko Endo	59,487	24.7	New
Democratic	Usami Noboru	49,662	20.6	New
JCP	Michinobu Tokutome	36,498	15.1	▼9.0
Liberal League	Miyuki Mitsuda	2,925	3.2	New
Turnout		N/A	62.5	▲2.8
Independent hold				

1998 House of Representatives By-Election
Party	Candidate	Votes	%	±%
LDP	Kensaku Morita	50,242	34.4	▲11.7
Independent	Jin Matsubara	35,521	24.3	New
JCP	Michinobu Tokutome	35,150	24.1	▲9.3
Independent	Tetsu Ueda	18,305	12.5	New
Liberal	Hiroyasu Satake	6,254	4.3	New
Independent	Setsuo Yamaguchi	662	0.6	New
Turnout		N/A	N/A	N/A
LDP gain from Independent				

1996 Japanese general election
Party	Candidate	Votes	%	±%
Independent	Shoukei Arai	78,805	38.2	New
LDP	Keigo Ouchi	46,840	22.7	New
JCP	Mitsuo Kobana	30,522	14.8	New
Democratic	Akiko Nakata	23,260	11.3	New
Independent	Tetsu Ueda	21,319	10.3	New
Independent	Osamu Kono	3,367	1.6	New
New Socialist	Naemi Kurosawa	2,418	1.2	New
Turnout		N/A	59.7	New
Independent win (new seat)				
