= Kazuyoshi Nakanishi =

Japanese politician

- 中西 一善

Member of the House of Representatives
- In office 10 November 2003 – 15 March 2005
- Preceded by: Kensaku Morita
- Succeeded by: Masaaki Taira
- Constituency: Tokyo 4th

Member of the Tokyo Metropolitan Assembly
- In office July 1997 – June 2003
- Constituency: Ōta Ward

Personal details
- Born: 19 April 1964 (age 62) Ōta, Tokyo, Japan
- Party: Independent
- Other political affiliations: Liberal Democratic
- Education: Waseda University

Kazuyoshi Nakanishi (中西 一善, Nakanishi Kazuyoshi) is a former Japanese politician who served as a member of the House of Representatives, the lower house of the National Diet. He served as a member of the Liberal Democratic Party. He resigned his position in the National Diet in 2005 after being arrested for groping a woman.
