= Sayaka Ando =

Japanese gravure idol and fashion model

- Born: 24 May 1981 (age 45); Takasaki, Gunma, Japan
- Occupations: gravure idol; fashion model
- Children: 2
- Website: http://www.feather-international.com/ansaya/

Sayaka Ando (安藤 沙耶香, Andō Sayaka; born 24 May 1981 in Takasaki, Gunma and raised in Sendai, Japan) is a Japanese gravure idol and fashion model. She made her debut in Eternal in 2004.

She is a graduate of Miyagi Gakuin Women's University.

== Personal life ==
She delivered her first child in September 2012, and her second in November 2014.

== Works ==
=== DVDs ===
- [2004.12.24] Eternal
- [2005.03.25] Lesson 2
- [2005.06.20] Healing Venus
- [2005.10.28] Aqua
- [2005.12.25] Ando Sayaka Collection Box
- [2006.04.21] Fascino
- [2006/08/22] Toi Kimi no Kioku
- [2007/02/16] Duet
- [2007/10/26] Day
- [2007/12/19] Night
- [2008/03/12] Poison

=== Photobooks ===
- [2005.04.xx] Mitsu no A

=== Sources ===
- Sayaka Ando at the Japanese Idol Directory

== See also ==
- List of Race Queens
- Sayaka Ando fan website
