= Tamio Kawakami =

Japanese politician and historian (1925–2012)

- 河上 民雄

Member of the House of Representatives
- In office 11 December 1972 – 24 January 1990
- Constituency: Hyōgo 1st
- In office 30 January 1967 – 2 December 1969

Personal details
- Born: 12 July 1925 Kobe, Hyōgo Prefecture, Japan
- Died: 22 September 2012 (aged 87)
- Party: Japan Socialist Party
- Other political affiliations: Right Socialist Party of Japan
- Parent: Jōtarō Kawakami (father) Sueko Hiraiwa (mother)
- Education: University of Tokyo
- Occupation: Politician, historian, university professor

Tamio Kawakami (河上 民雄, Kawakami Tamio; 12 July 1925 – 22 September 2012) was a Japanese politician and historian. He served as a member of the House of Representatives for seven terms and as International Bureau Director of the Japan Socialist Party. He was also a professor at the Faculty of Political Science and Economics of Tokai University and later a visiting professor at the graduate school of Seigakuin University. He specialised in American history.

== Early life and education ==
Kawakami was born in Kobe, Hyōgo Prefecture, as the eldest son of Jōtarō Kawakami, a professor at Kwansei Gakuin University who later became a member of the House of Representatives and chairman of both the Right Socialist Party of Japan and the Japan Socialist Party.

He attended the former Shizuoka High School (now part of Shizuoka University) and graduated from the Department of Western History in the Faculty of Letters of the University of Tokyo in 1948. After graduation he worked briefly as a high-school teacher but was forced to resign because of illness. While recovering he worked as a translator and as political secretary and ghostwriter for his father. In 1955, when the Japan Socialist Party was reunified, he co-authored the Right Socialist Party’s draft unification platform (known as the “Right Socialist Platform”) with Shinpei Fujimaki.

From 1963 to 1964 he studied American history at Columbia University. In 1966 he was appointed professor in the Faculty of Political Science and Economics at Tokai University, a post he continued to hold while serving as a member of the Diet.

== Political career ==
Following the death of his father in 1965, Kawakami was selected as the successor candidate in the 1967 Japanese general election and was elected to the House of Representatives for the first time (Hyōgo 1st district). Like his grandfather and father, he was a devout Christian. From around 1967 he strongly opposed moves by the Liberal Democratic Party to introduce a bill for state support of Yasukuni Shrine, becoming a leading figure in the opposition campaign. As a result he lost the support of the Japan War-Bereaved Families Association and was defeated in the 1969 Japanese general election.

He regained his seat in the 1972 Japanese general election and was re-elected continuously until he retired from politics before the 1990 Japanese general election.

Within the Japan Socialist Party Kawakami was one of the few pro-American members. He frequently handled the party’s international affairs, making use of his language skills. When the party sent a delegation to the United States led by Saburō Eda in 1975, the first such visit in 18 years, Kawakami took charge of all the practical arrangements.

== International Bureau Director of the Japan Socialist Party ==
In September 1977 the then International Bureau Director, Hideo Den, left the party. Kawakami took over the post and was formally elected at the party’s 41st continued congress on 13 December 1977. He successfully organised the Socialist International leaders’ conference held in Tokyo from 17 to 19 December 1977 and remained International Bureau Director until 1982.

At the time the Japan Socialist Party had become distant from the Socialist International, usually sending only junior International Bureau staff to its meetings. Kawakami made a point of attending personally whenever possible in order to strengthen the party’s voice within the organisation.

At the 15th Congress of the Socialist International in 1980 he successfully pressed for the name of Kim Dae-jung, who had been sentenced to death in a fabricated trial in South Korea, to be included in the closing address by Chairman Willy Brandt. Brandt declared “Kim Dae-jung must not be killed.” The resulting international pressure helped prevent the execution, and Kim was later released.

== Later life and death ==
Kawakami did not stand in the 1990 general election and retired from politics. The Hyōgo prefectural federation of the Japan Socialist Party selected Ryuichi Doi, a former secretary of Kawakami, as his successor. After retirement he devoted himself fully to teaching at Tokai University until reaching the mandatory retirement age in 1996. He later taught at the graduate school of Seigakuin University.

He died of interstitial pneumonia on 22 September 2012 at the age of 87. His grave is in Aoyama Cemetery.

== Activities ==
- In the 1970 “Pastoral Activity Incident” (in which a pastor of Amagasaki Church was prosecuted for harbouring two high-school students wanted by the police on suspicion of trespassing), Kawakami served as special defence counsel for the pastor.
- In 1989 he signed a petition calling for the release of 29 ethnic Korean political prisoners in Japan; the list included ten people suspected of being North Korean agents, among them Sin Gwang-su, who was involved in the North Korean abductions of Japanese citizens.
- In 1989 he founded the Anti-Apartheid Diet Members’ League and became its chairman.
- In 1999 he was appointed chairman of the Operations Deliberation Committee of the Japan Sumo Association.

== Books ==
- Gendai seijika no jōken (Conditions for the Modern Politician), Shunjūsha, 1968
- Seiji to ningen-zō (Politics and Human Portraits), Ningen no Kagakusha, 1975
- Shakaitō no gaikō (The Diplomacy of the Socialist Party), Simul Press, 1994
- Kaikyō no ryōgawa kara Yasukuni o kangaeru (Thinking about Yasukuni from Both Sides of the Strait), Alter Publishing Room, 2006 (co-authored with Pak Chang-hŭi and others)
- Shōsha to haisha no kindai-gendaishi (Modern and Contemporary History of Winners and Losers), Kamakura Shunjūsha, 2007
- Kawakami Tamio: 20-seiki no kaisō (Tamio Kawakami: Recollections of the 20th Century), Alter Publishing Room, 2012

== Translations ==
- G. D. H. Cole, Igirisu rōdō undō-shi (A History of the British Labour Movement), Iwanami Shoten, 1952 (co-translator)
- Sidney Hook, Marukusu to Marukusu-shugisha-tachi (Marx and the Marxists), Gendai Kyōyō Bunko, 1956 (co-translator)
- John Strachey, Ōinaru mezame (The Great Awakening), Yūki Shobō, 1962
- Theodore C. Sorensen, Howaito Hausu no seisaku kettei no katei (Decision-Making in the White House), Jiyūsha, 1964
