= Kensaku Morita =

Japanese politician, actor and singer

- 森田 健作
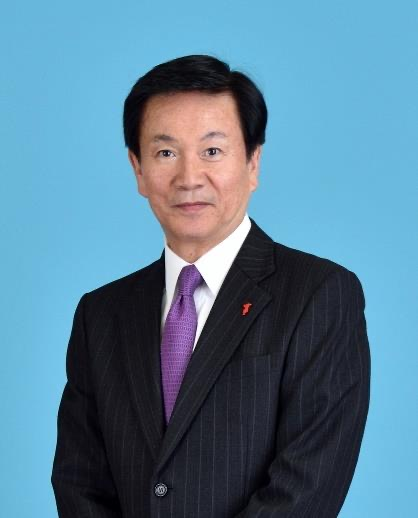
- Official portrait, 2009

Governor of Chiba Prefecture
- In office 5 April 2009 – 4 April 2021
- Monarchs: Akihito; Naruhito
- Preceded by: Akiko Dōmoto
- Succeeded by: Toshihito Kumagai

Member of the House of Representatives
- In office 29 March 1998 – 10 October 2003
- Preceded by: Shokei Arai
- Succeeded by: Kazuyoshi Nakanishi
- Constituency: Tokyo 4th

Member of the House of Councillors
- In office 27 July 1992 – 17 March 1998
- Preceded by: Tetsuo Tanabe
- Succeeded by: Miyo Inoue
- Constituency: Tokyo at-large

Personal details
- Born: 鈴木 栄治 (Suzuki Eiji); 16 December 1949 (age 76) Ōta, Tokyo, Japan
- Party: Independent (2000–2001; 2005–present)
- Other political affiliations: DSP (1992–1994); LDP (1994–2000; 2001–2005)
- Education: Meiji Gakuin University

Kensaku Morita (森田 健作, Morita Kensaku; born 16 December 1949; birth name: 鈴木 栄治 Eiji Suzuki) is a retired Japanese politician, actor and singer. He was elected to three terms as governor of Chiba Prefecture, serving from April 2009 to April 2021.

== Political career ==
Morita served one term in the House of Councillors of the National Diet, representing the Tokyo at-large district from 1992 until 1998, and two terms in the House of Representatives from 1998 until 2003, representing the Tokyo 4th district. Morita was elected as the Governor of Chiba Prefecture in 2009 and served until his retirement in 2021.

== Film ==
Morita has acted in a number of films, including -

- Castle of Sand (1972) : Hiroshi Yoshimura
- Mount Hakkoda (1977) : Mikami
- The War in Space (1977) : Miyoshi
- The Fall of Ako Castle (1978) : Jujiro Hazama
- Sanada Yukimura no Bōryaku (1979) : Juzo Kakei
- Virus (1980) : Ryûji Sanazawa

== Television ==
- Orewa otokoda! (1971)
- Hissatsu Karakurinin (1976)

== Notes ==
Preceded by Akiko Dōmoto	Governor of Chiba Prefecture; April 2009 – April 2021	Succeeded by Toshihito Kumagai
