= Hyōgo 1st district =

Constituency of the House of Representatives in Japan

Hyōgo 1st District
- Parliamentary constituency for the Japanese House of Representatives
- Numbered map of Hyōgo Prefecture single-member districts
- Prefecture: Hyōgo
- Proportional District: Kinki
- Electorate: 390,435

Current constituency
- Created: 1994
- Seats: One
- Party: Liberal Democratic
- Representative: Masahito Moriyama
- Municipalities: Part of Kobe

Hyogo 1st district (兵庫県第1区, Hyōgo-ken Dai-ichiku), also referred to as Hyogo No.1 district and Hyōgo ichi-ku (兵庫1区) in Japanese, is a constituency of the House of Representatives in the national Diet of Japan. It is located in southwestern Hyogo Prefecture and consists of the Chūō, Nada and Higashinada wards of Kobe. As of September 2015, 378,434 eligible voters were registered in the district. It is one of the 48 districts in the Kansai region that form the Kinki proportional representation block.

The district was established as part of the electoral reform of 1994; the area was previously part of Hyōgo 1st district, which covered the whole of Kobe and elected five representatives by single non-transferable vote. The reform abolished the system of multi-member districts that had existed since 1947 and replaced them with small single-member districts coupled with large multi-member proportional representation blocks.

Since the district's creation it has been heavily contested and the seat has frequently changed hands between parties. Until the 2024 election only the first member Hajime Ishii had won consecutive elections.

== List of representatives ==
Representative	Party	Dates	Notes
Hajime Ishii	New Frontier (1996–98)	1996 – 2003	Elected to Kinki PR block in 2003
Hajime Ishii	DPJ (1998-2003)	1996 – 2003	Elected to Kinki PR block in 2003
Keisuke Sunada	LDP	2003 – 2005	Elected to Kinki PR block in 1996 and 2000
Masahito Moriyama	LDP	2005 – 2009	
Masae Ido	DPJ	2009 – 2012	
Masahito Moriyama	LDP	2012 – 2014	Elected to Kinki PR block in 2014
Nobuhiko Isaka	Innovation	2014 – 2017	Elected to Kinki PR block as a Your Party candidate in 2012
Masahito Moriyama	LDP	2017 – 2021	Elected to Kinki PR block in 2021
Nobuhiko Isaka	CDP	2021 – 2026	
Masahito Moriyama	LDP	2026 –	

== Election results ==
2026
Party	Candidate	Votes	%	±%
LDP	Masahito Moriyama	73,219	33.5	▲11.5
Centrist Reform	Nobuhiko Isaka	69,111	31.6	▼12.3
Ishin	Yūichirō Ichitani (elected in Kinki PR block)	44,364	20.3	▲4.3
Sanseitō	Yasuhiko Hara	14,247	9.5	▲3.8
JCP	Hiromi Fujisue	11,283	5.2	▼1.6
Registered electors		390,435		
Turnout			57.02	▲2.27
LDP gain from Centrist Reform				

2024
Party	Candidate	Votes	%	±%
CDP	Nobuhiko Isaka	91,797	43.9	▲7.0
LDP	Masahito Moriyama	45,987	22.0	▼7.9
Ishin	Yūichirō Ichitani	33,430	16.0	▼9.0
JCP	Hiromi Fujisue	14,247	6.8	
Sanseitō	Satomi Yamaoka	12,011	5.7	
Independent	Kuniya Kihara	9,731	4.7	
Independent	Hirotsugu Kijima	1,914	0.9	
Registered electors		391,056		
Turnout			54.75	▼0.73
CDP hold				

2021
Party	Candidate	Votes	%	±%
CDP	Nobuhiko Isaka	78,657	36.9	
LDP	Masahito Moriyama (won a seat in Kinki PR block)	64,202	30.1	▼9.3
Ishin	Yūichirō Ichitani (won a seat in Kinki PR block)	53,211	25.0	▲8.7
Independent	Shingo ´Takahashi	9,922	4.7	
Independent	Kuniya Kihara	7,174	3.4	
Turnout			55.48	▲7.67
CDP gain from LDP				

2017
Party	Candidate	Votes	%	±%
LDP	Masahito Moriyama	71,861	39.4	▼0.3
Kibō no Tō	Nobuhiko Isaka	59,191	32.5	
Ishin	Satoshi Umemura	29,660	16.3	
JCP	Tomoyuki Rikishige	21,454	11.8	▼2.3
Turnout			47.81	▼2.24
LDP gain from Democratic				

2014
Party	Candidate	Votes	%	±%
Innovation	Nobuhiko Isaka	84,822	46.2	10.4
LDP	Masahito Moriyama (Endorsed by Komeito) Elected to Kinki PR block	72,791	39.7	2.5
JCP	Tetsujiro Tsutsui	25,875	14.1	5.3
Turnout			50.05	

2012
Party	Candidate	Votes	%	±%
LDP	Masahito Moriyama (Endorsed by Komeito)	76,401	37.2	4.9
Your	Nobuhiko Isaka (Endorsed by Restoration) Elected to Kinki PR block	73,587	35.8	35.8
Democratic	Masae Ido (Endorsed by People's New)	37,584	18.3	−30.3
JCP	Tetsujiro Tsutsui	18,059	8.8	−0.3
Turnout				

2009
Party	Candidate	Votes	%	±%
Democratic	Masae Ido	111,183	48.6	19.3
LDP	Masahito Moriyama (Endorsed by Komeito)	73,767	32.3	−10.7
JCP	Toshiyuki Ajiguchi	20,760	9.1	−0.5
Independent	Kazumi Hara	19,995	8.7	−1.1
Happiness Realization	Kenji Makiyama	2,868	1.3	1.3
Turnout				

2005
Party	Candidate	Votes	%	±%
LDP	Masahito Moriyama	95,746	42.97	
Democratic	Hajime Ishii	65,386	29.34	
Independent	Kazumi Hara	21,844	9.80	
JCP	Toshiyuki Ajiguchi	21,402	9.60	
Independent	Keisuke Sunada (Endorsed by Lib. Dem.)	16,074	7.21	
Independent	Shinichi Iwamoto	2,392	1.07	
Turnout				

== See also ==
- Hyogo at-large district, a multi-member district that represents the entire Hyogo Prefecture in the House of Councillors
