= Ryuichi Doi =

Japanese politician (1939–2016)

- 土肥 隆一

Member of the House of Representatives
- In office 18 February 1990 – 16 November 2012
- Preceded by: Tamio Kawakami
- Succeeded by: Yoshihiro Seki
- Constituency: Hyōgo 1st (1990–1996); Hyōgo 3rd (1996–2005); Kinki PR (2005–2009); Hyōgo 3rd (2009–2012)

Personal details
- Born: 11 February 1939 Keijō, Korea, Empire of Japan
- Died: 22 January 2016 (aged 76) Kobe, Hyōgo, Japan
- Party: Democratic (1998–2011)
- Other political affiliations: JSP (1990–1996); DRP (1996–1998); Independent (2011–2012)
- Education: Tokyo Union Theological Seminary
- Occupation: Pastor, political secretary

Ryuichi Doi (土肥 隆一, Doi Ryūichi; 11 February 1939 – 22 January 2016) was a Japanese politician who served in the House of Representatives in the Diet (national legislature) as a member of the Democratic Party of Japan. He was born in Seoul, when Korea was under Japanese rule. He attended Tokyo Union Theological Seminary, earning a master's degree. In 1990 he was elected for the first time as a member of the Japan Socialist Party.

In April 2014, he was awarded the Order of the Rising Sun, Grand Cordon.

He was an active pastor for the United Church of Christ in Japan, and preached at the Wada Mountains Salt Mission, which was attached to Keiseien (Asago City, Hyōgo Prefecture), a support facility for people with disabilities under the umbrella of a social welfare corporation that he chaired.

He died on 22 January 2016 at a hospital in Kobe, aged 76. He was posthumously awarded the rank of Shoshii.
