= Sadie Lea Weidner =

American missionary to Japan (1875 – 1939)

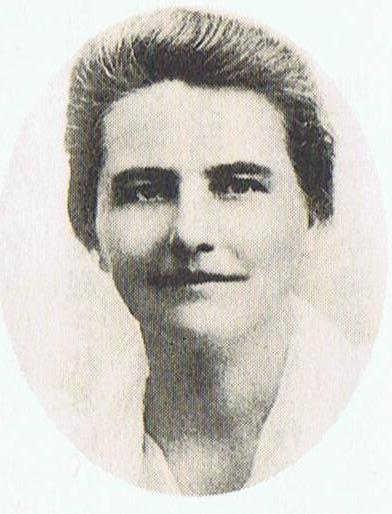
- An illustration of Weidner
- Born: March 3, 1875; Upper Milford Township, Pennsylvania, U.S.
- Died: December 24, 1939 (aged 64); Port of Yokohama, Yokohama, Japan
- Other names: セディ・リー・ワイドナー
- Occupation: Missionary
- Organization(s): Miyagi Gakuin Women's University; Mino Mission

Sadie Lea Weidner (March 3, 1875 – December 24, 1939) was an American missionary to Japan. She was involved in church reforms and was the founder of the Mino mission in Japan.

== Early life and education ==
Weidner was born on March 3, 1875, in Upper Milford Township, Pennsylvania, the daughter of Edwin H. Weidner and Rebecca (Schultz) Weidner. She started her education at Baltimore Elementary School in Ohio. She also studied at Mount Eaton and Bellevue high schools. She continued her higher education at Heidelberg University in Tiffin, Ohio. She briefly studied at Moody Bible Institute in Chicago, In 1909, she studied language, school systems, and their legal aspects at Columbia University in New York City.

== Career ==
She began her professional career as a teacher and taught in an elementary school for a period of five years.

When she visited Japan for the first time in June 1900, she was assigned as a school teacher and missionary in Sendai City, Miyagi Prefecture. During a brief visit to the U.S. in 1907, she visited local churches in order to mobilize support for Miyagi Girls' School and the mission activity in Japan.

In August 1909, she returned to Japan, where she was founded Miyagi Girls' School and served as its principal. In 1918, she established a group of Christian churches, known as the Mino mission, in Gifu Prefecture.

Weidner was known for her opposition to Japanese Shinto religious traditions.

== Death ==
She died on December 24, 1939 at age 64, in Yokohama, Japan.

== See also ==
- Christianity in Japan
- Protestantism in Japan
