= Miyagi Gakuin Women's University =

Miyagi Gakuin Women's University located in Sendai

Coordinates: 38°18′21.8″N 140°51′14.3″E

- 宮城学院女子大学
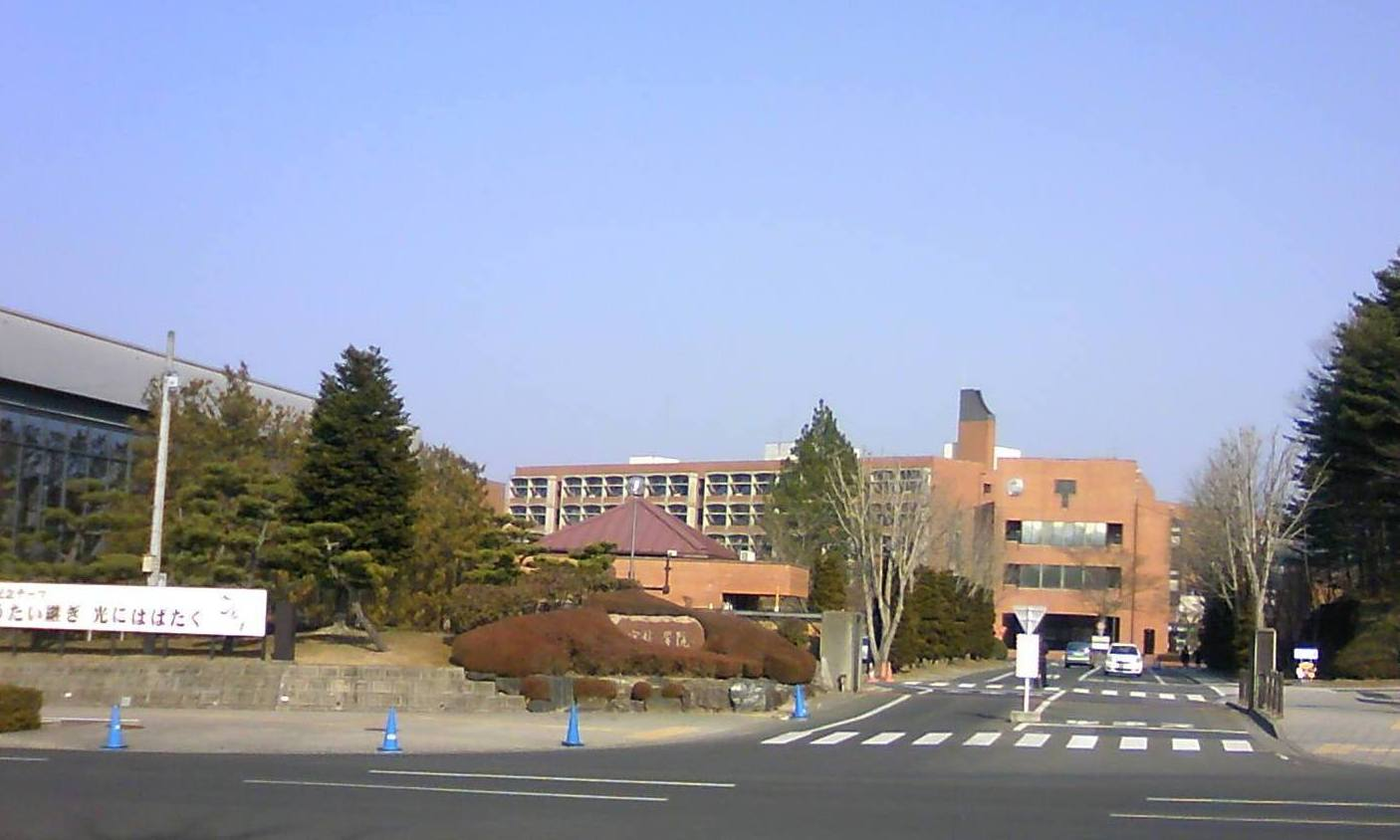
- Miyagi Gakuin Women's University
- Type: Private
- Established: 1886 / 1949
- Location: Aoba-ku, Sendai, Miyagi Prefecture, Japan
- Website: Official website

Miyagi Gakuin Women's University (宮城学院女子大学, Miyagi gakuin joshi daigaku) is a private university in Aoba-ku, Sendai, Miyagi, Japan. Tohoku Gakuin University is its brother school.

== History ==
The Miyagi Girls' School was founded by the Reformed Church in the United States in Japan with the assistance of missionaries Masayoshi Oshikawa and William Edwin Hoy in 1886, and later by the American missionary Sadie Lea Weidner. It was expanded into a high school in 1911, and chartered as a university in 1946.

== Organization ==
=== Undergraduate ===
- Faculty of Arts
  - Department of English
  - Japanese Literature Department
  - Department of Human Culture
  - Psychology Department of Behavioral Sciences
  - Music department
  - Food and Nutrition Department
  - Life and Culture Department of Design
  - Department of clinical development
  - International Culture Department
  - Children's Department of Education

=== Graduate ===
- Humanities Graduate School of Humanities
  - English, Department of English and American Literature
  - Japanese Language and Literature Department
  - Human Culture Department
  - Life and Culture Design Department
  - Health and Nutrition Studies

== Affiliated schools ==
- Miyagi Gakuin Junior & Senior High School
- Miyagi Gakuin Kindergarten

== Alumni ==
- Toshiko Abe - politician
- Sayaka Ando - gravure idol
