= Heidelberg University (Ohio) =

Liberal arts college in Tiffin, Ohio, US

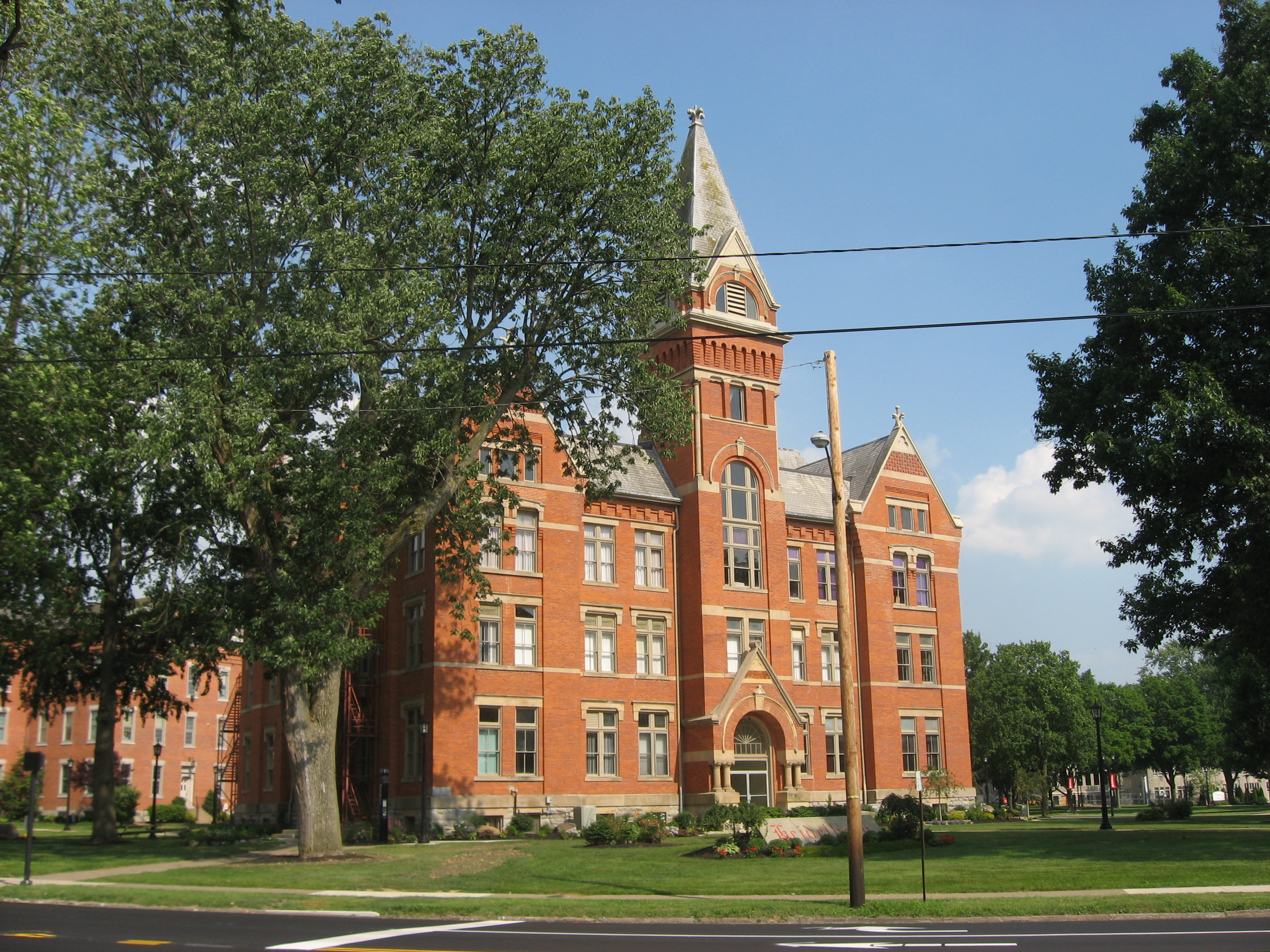
- University Hall
- Former name: Heidelberg College (1850–1889, 1926–2009)
- Type: Private university
- Established: 1850; 176 years ago
- Religious affiliation: United Church of Christ
- Endowment: $73.5 million (2024)
- President: Robert H. Huntington
- Students: 1,091 (Fall 2024)
- Location: Tiffin, Ohio, U.S. 41°06′53″N 83°10′01″W
- Campus: 110 acres (44.5 ha)
- Colors: Red, orange, black
- Sporting affiliations: NCAA Division III — OAC
- Mascot: The Student Prince
- Website: heidelberg.edu

Heidelberg University is a private university in Tiffin, Ohio, United States. Founded in 1850, it was known as "Heidelberg College" until 1889 and from 1926 to 2009. It is affiliated with the United Church of Christ and enrolled 1,000 students in 2023.

== History ==
Heidelberg University was founded by the German Reformed Church as "Heidelberg College" in 1850 in Ohio. It is affiliated with the United Church of Christ, the successor to that denomination. In the mid-nineteenth century, there were a significant number of German immigrants in Ohio. The German Reformed Church had seventy-four churches in the state when members decided to establish the college. The college had five students enrolled in the first classes. By the end of the year, 149 students were enrolled.

On the morning of October 25, 2008, the Heidelberg College Board of Trustees unanimously agreed to transition to "Heidelberg University". The name change went into effect at the beginning of the 2009–2010 academic year.

== Campus ==
Heidelberg is situated on 110 acres (44.5 ha) enclosed in Tiffin, Ohio, the county seat of Seneca County, in northwestern Ohio. The campus is located on the east side of Tiffin on College Hill, within a half mile of downtown Tiffin.

Heidelberg's campus includes 26 buildings, 10 of which are listed on the National Register of Historic Places. The architecture ranges from pure Greek Revival and Victorian Gothic to English Gothic and the functional style. Many of the buildings are formed in gray Bloomville limestone with cut Bedford stone for trim, bringing a sense of overall unity to the various styles.

== Student life ==
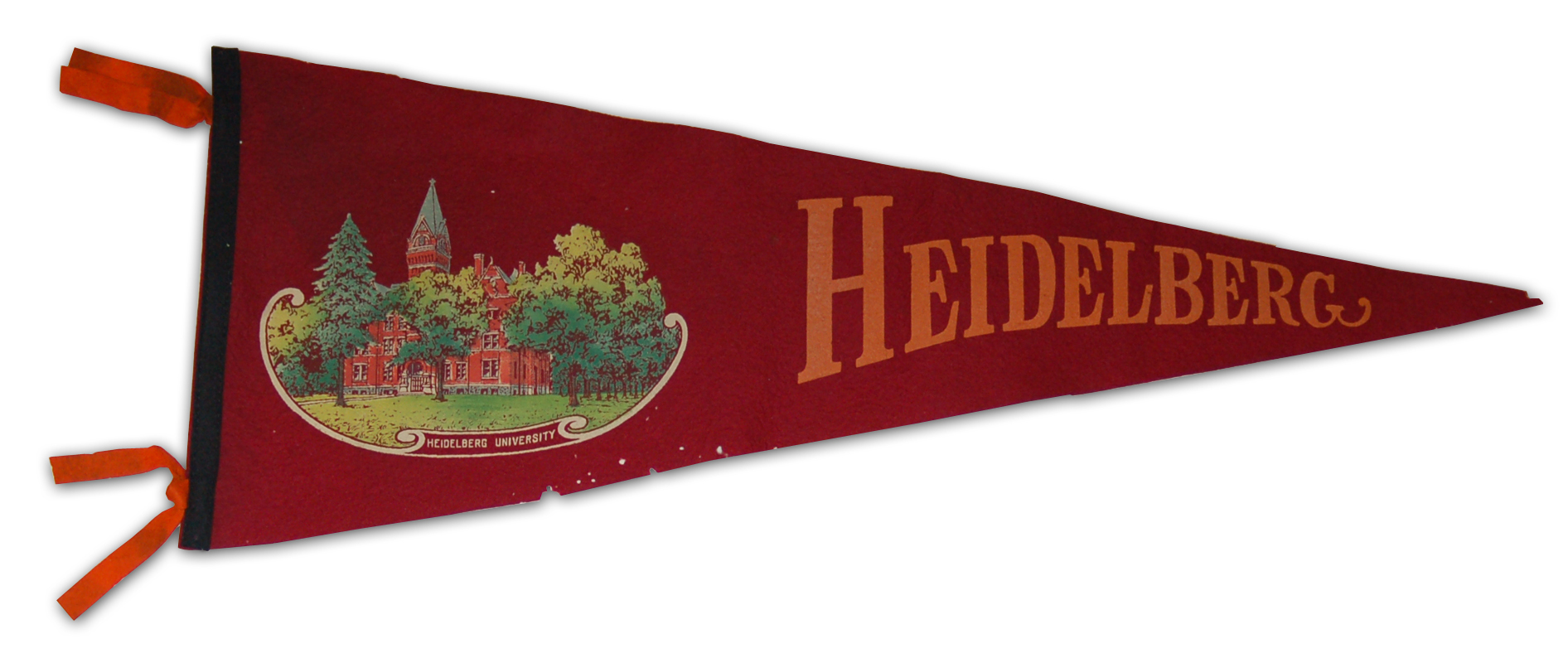
1920s felt school pennant

Students are culturally and geographically diverse, originating from all parts of the country. Eight percent of the students come from other countries. Fifty-three percent are male and forty-seven percent are female.

Roughly eighty-five percent of students live in campus-owned housing, which includes seven traditional residence halls, Townhouses, and Apartments overlooking the stadium.

=== Greek life ===
Heidelberg University has ten different social Greek organizations: five fraternities, four sororities, and one mixed-gender society. Each of the Greek organizations is local and specific only to Heidelberg University. They are governed by the Greek Life Council.

== Athletics ==
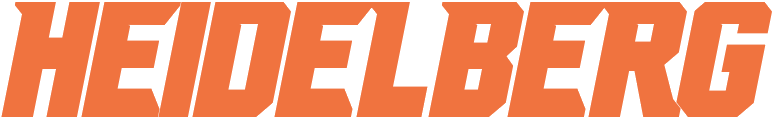
Heidelberg athletics wordmark

Heidelberg is affiliated with NCAA Division III athletics and is a member of the Ohio Athletic Conference. Heidelberg is the oldest member of the OAC, which is the third oldest conference in the nation and was founded in 1902. Heidelberg has won 46 Ohio Athletic Conference championships in the history of the athletic program, which dates back to 1892. The school has the mascot "Student Prince," originating from the Sigmund Romberg operetta of the same name.

Men's sports	Women's sports
Baseball	Basketball
Basketball	Cross country
Cross country	Golf
Football	Soccer
Golf	Softball
Lacrosse	Stunt
Soccer	Swimming
Swimming	Track and field^{1}
Track and field^{1}	Volleyball
Wrestling	Wrestling
^{1} – includes both indoor and outdoor

Heidelberg University's history of intercollegiate athletics dates back to 1892, when The Berg beat Findlay in football, 20–0. Since then, the athletic program has grown to 22 teams competing at the NCAA Division III level in the Ohio Athletic Conference.

Esports were added in 2023–2024.

Volleyball has qualified for the NCAA Tournament eight times (2007–2012, 2015–2016). They have won six OAC regular season titles (1986, 2009–2011, 2013, 2015) and two tournament titles (2010, 2015).

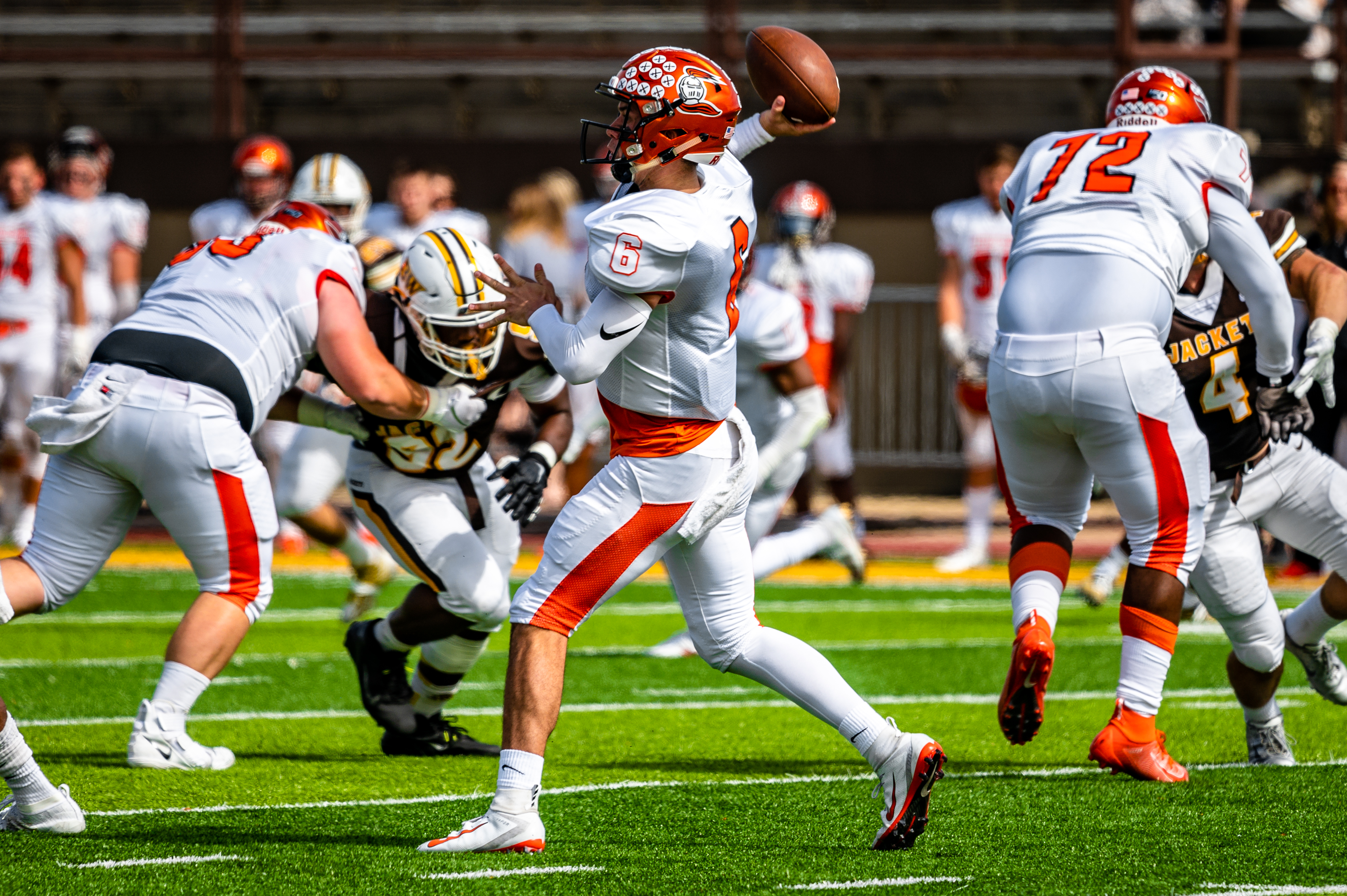
Heidelberg Student Princes football team

On the gridiron, the Student Princes won the 1972 Amos Alonzo Stagg Bowl under the guidance of head coach Pete Riesen.

Men's cross country had four-straight seasons of qualifying for the NCAA Championship (2006, 2007, 2008, 2009) and seven overall in school history (1997, 1998, 1999). They also captured their fourth OAC Championships in 2009, which added to their titles in 1998, 1999 and 2000. The Berg men's cross country team also was honored by the USTFCCCA in 2009 by having the second highest GPA in NCAA DIII and the fourth highest in the nation among all cross country teams in any division.

The wrestling team captured OAC Tournament Championships in 2006, 2007, 2008, 2009, and 2010. The wrestlers were also OAC Regular Season Championships in 2006, 2008, and 2009.

Baseball has won two regional titles and seven OAC Championships. They were OAC Tournament Champions 2004, 2008, 2009, and 2010 and regular season champions in 2003, 2007, 2008, 2009, 2010, 2015, and 2019. In 2010, they also captured their first NCAA Regional Championship and finished fourth in the nation at the NCAA DIII Baseball World Series. Heidelberg hosted, and won, the first-ever Mideast Super Regional in 2019, sweeping The College of Wooster.

The men's track and field team also had success when it placed 14th in the nation in 2007. The team also captured its third OAC Outdoor Track and Field Championship in 2010, adding it to the championship years of 1999 and 2000.

The Heidelberg men's running program (Cross Country, Indoor Track & Field, Outdoor Track & Field) in the 2009–2010 school year finished as the 14th best program among NCAA DIII schools because of their high event finishes at the NCAA Division III National Championships.

== Notable alumni ==
- Franklin Gene Bissell – college football coach
- Jim Boeke – professional football player
- Bob Briggs – professional football player
- John Buccigross – sports broadcaster
- Donteea Dye – professional football player
- Bill Groman – professional football player
- Sue Myrick – politician
- Michael Preston – professional football player
- Brian Regan – comedian
- Rob Rue – politician
- Frank Seiberling – business executive
- Gene Smith – professional football manager
- Doug Stephan – radio talk show personality
- Sadie Lea Weidner – missionary
- James Slough Zerbe – mechanical engineer, early airplane designer
