= Toshiko Abe =

Japanese politician (born 1959)

- 阿部 俊子
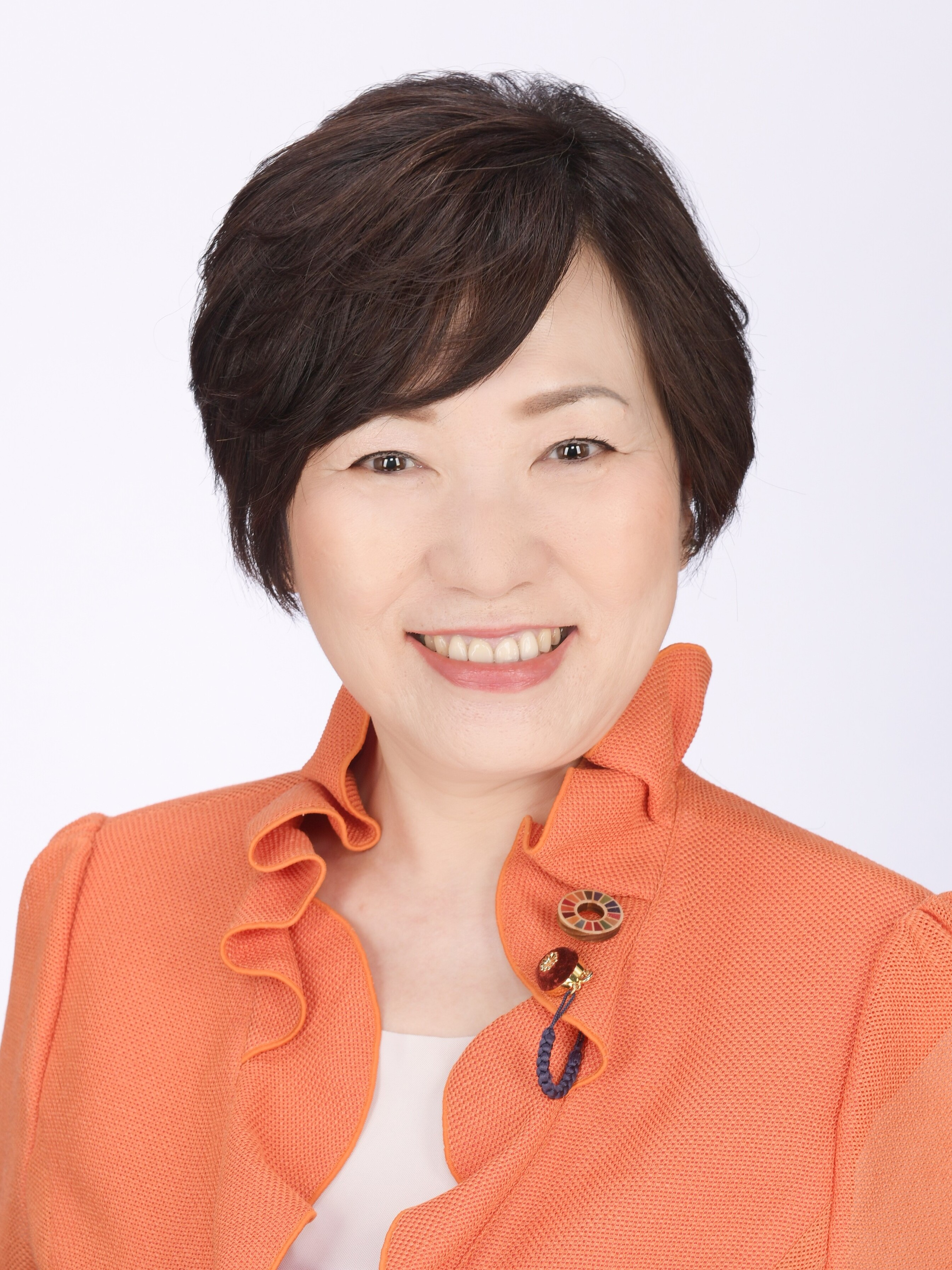
- Official portrait, 2020

Minister of Education, Culture, Sports, Science and Technology
- In office 1 October 2024 – 21 October 2025
- Prime Minister: Shigeru Ishiba
- Preceded by: Masahito Moriyama
- Succeeded by: Yohei Matsumoto

Member of the House of Representatives
- Incumbent
- Assumed office 11 September 2005
- Preceded by: Multi-member district
- Constituency: Chugoku PR (2005–2017); Okayama 3rd (2017–2021); Chugoku PR (2021–2024); Kyushu PR (2024–2026); Chugoku PR (2026–present)

Personal details
- Born: 19 May 1959 (age 67) Ishinomaki, Miyagi, Japan
- Party: Liberal Democratic
- Education: Miyagi Gakuin Women's Junior College; Mitsui Memorial Hospital Nursing School; University of Alabama at Birmingham; University of Illinois at Chicago (PhD)

Toshiko Abe (阿部 俊子, Abe Toshiko; born 19 May 1959) is a Japanese politician of the Liberal Democratic Party, a member of the House of Representatives in the Diet, since 2005.

== Early life ==
A native of Miyagi Prefecture, Abe attended Miyagi Gakuin Women's Junior College and Mitsui Memorial Hospital Nursing School; University of Alabama at Birmingham, and University of Illinois at Chicago for her Doctorate (PhD.) in the United States.

== Political career ==
Abe was elected to the House of Representatives for the first time in September 2005.

She was one of the incoming group of representatives referred to as the Koizumi Children.

== Family ==
She currently resides in her home prefecture in Japan, and she is divorced from Bloomberg media professional, J. M. Moran (Chicago Illinois).

== See also ==
- Koizumi Children

Political offices
Preceded by Masahito Moriyama	Minister of Education, Culture, Sports, Science and Technology; 2024–present	Incumbent
