= Hyōgo 1st district (1947–1993) =

Legislative district of Japan

Hyogo 1st district (兵庫県第1区, Hyōgo-ken Dai-ichiku) was a multi-member constituency of the House of Representatives in the Diet of Japan. It represented the city of Kobe from its establishment in 1947 until it was abolished as part of the electoral reform of 1994. Following the district's dissolution, Kobe is now represented by the single-member Hyogo 1st, 2nd and 3rd districts, while the Kita ward of the city forms part of the current Hyogo 4th district.

Ichiro Watanabe of the Komeito party was the longest-serving representative of the district, serving nine consecutive terms from 1967 until 1993. Hajime Ishii won eight elections in the district, seven as a Liberal Democratic candidate and once representing the Japan Renewal Party; he lost once as a LDP candidate in the 1983 general election.

In the district's final election, the five representatives were Akaba, Ishii, Ryuichi Doi (Democratic Socialist Party), Yuichi Takami (Japan New Party) and Hiromi Okazaki (independent). In the 1996 general election that followed the 1994 reforms, Ishii won the new Hyogo 1st district, Akaba defeated Takami in the 2nd district, and Doi defeated Okazaki in the 3rd district.

== Elected Representatives ==
Notes:

- Representatives are not listed in order of polling
- Party affiliations as of election day

Election year	Representatives				
Election year	#1 (1947-1996)	#2 (1947-1996)	#3 (1947-1996)	#4 (1967-1996)	#5 (1976-1996)
1947	Kazuo Nagae (SDPJ)	Kenjin Matsuzawa (SDPJ)	Ryōichi Tsukuda (Democratic)	-	-
1949	Toshio Tachibana (JCP)	Kenjin Matsuzawa (SDPJ)	Shinpachi Shutō (Democratic Liberal)	-	-
1952	Jōtarō Kawakami (Rightist Socialist)	Kazuo Nakai (Liberal)	Shinpachi Shutō (Liberal)	-	-
1953	Jōtarō Kawakami (Rightist Socialist)	Kazuo Nakai (Liberal)	Shinpachi Shutō (Secessionist Liberal)	-	-
1955	Jōtarō Kawakami (Rightist Socialist)	Torao Gotō (Leftist Socialist)	Shinpachi Shutō (Democratic)	-	-
1958	Jōtarō Kawakami (SDPJ)	Torao Gotō (SDPJ)	Kazuo Nakai (LDP)	-	-
1960	Jōtarō Kawakami (SDPJ)	Torao Gotō (SDPJ)	Shinpachi Shutō (LDP)	-	-
1963	Jōtarō Kawakami (SDPJ)	Torao Gotō (SDPJ)	Shigetami Sunada (LDP)	-	-
1967	Tamio Kawakami (SDPJ)	Kazuo Nagae (Democratic Socialist)	Shigetami Sunada (LDP)	Ichiro Watanabe (Komeito)	-
1969	Yō Urai (JCP)	Hajime Ishii (LDP)	Shigetami Sunada (LDP)	Ichiro Watanabe (Komeito)	-
1972	Yō Urai (JCP)	Hajime Ishii (LDP)	Tamio Kawakami (SDPJ)	Ichiro Watanabe (Komeito)	-
1976	Yō Urai (JCP)	Hajime Ishii (LDP)	Tamio Kawakami (SDPJ)	Ichiro Watanabe (Komeito)	Shigetami Sunada (LDP)
1979	Yō Urai (JCP)	Hajime Ishii (LDP)	Tamio Kawakami (SDPJ)	Ichiro Watanabe (Komeito)	Kazuhito Nagae (Democratic Socialist)
1980	Yō Urai (JCP)	Hajime Ishii (LDP)	Tamio Kawakami (SDPJ)	Ichiro Watanabe (Komeito)	Shigetami Sunada (LDP)
1983	Yō Urai (JCP)	Kazuhito Nagae (Democratic Socialist)	Tamio Kawakami (SDPJ)	Ichiro Watanabe (Komeito)	Shigetami Sunada (LDP)
1986	Yō Urai (JCP)	Hajime Ishii (LDP)	Tamio Kawakami (SDPJ)	Ichiro Watanabe (Komeito)	Shigetami Sunada (LDP)
1990	Ryuichi Doi (Democratic Socialist)	Hajime Ishii (LDP)	Hiromi Okazaki (Ind. (Reformist))	Ichiro Watanabe (Komeito)	Shigetami Sunada (LDP)
1993	Ryuichi Doi (Democratic Socialist)	Hajime Ishii (Renewal)	Hiromi Okazaki (Ind. (Reformist))	Kazuyoshi Akaba (Komeito)	Yuichi Takami (New)
