= Masahito Moriyama =

Japanese politician

- 盛山 正仁
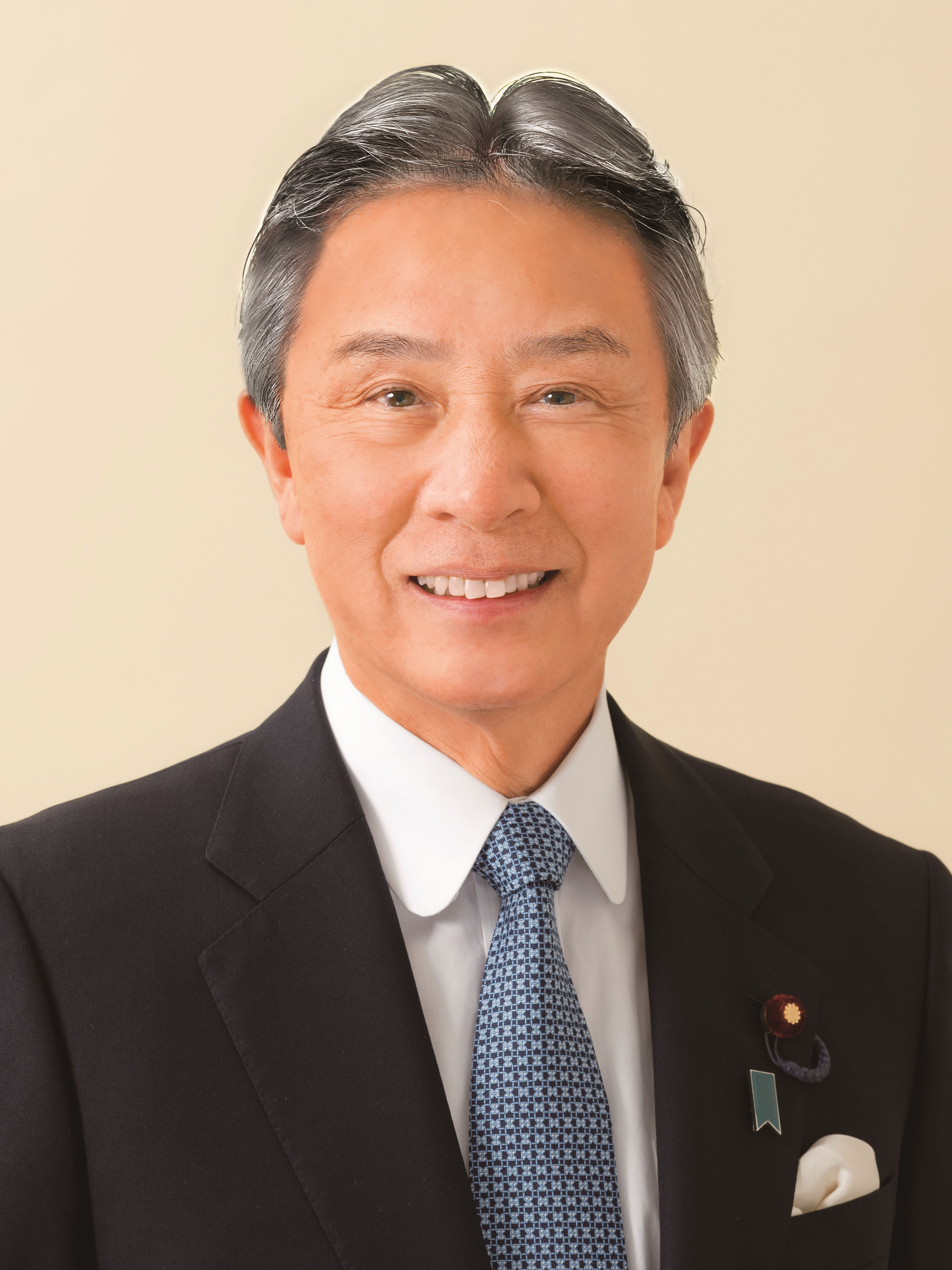
- Official portrait, 2023

Minister of Education, Culture, Sports, Science and Technology
- In office 13 September 2023 – 1 October 2024
- Prime Minister: Fumio Kishida
- Preceded by: Keiko Nagaoka
- Succeeded by: Toshiko Abe

Member of the House of Representatives
- Incumbent
- Assumed office 8 February 2026
- Preceded by: Nobuhiko Isaka
- Constituency: Hyōgo 1st
- In office 17 December 2012 – 9 October 2024
- Preceded by: Masae Ido
- Succeeded by: Multi-member district
- Constituency: Hyōgo 1st (2012–2014); Kinki PR (2014–2017); Hyōgo 1st (2017–2021); Kinki PR (2021–2024)
- In office 12 September 2005 – 21 July 2009
- Preceded by: Keisuke Sunada
- Succeeded by: Masae Ido
- Constituency: Hyōgo 1st

Personal details
- Born: 14 December 1953 (age 72) Nishinomiya, Hyogo, Japan
- Party: Liberal Democratic
- Children: 4
- Relatives: Hajime Tamura (father-in-law)
- Education: University of Tokyo; Kobe University (PhD)

Masahito Moriyama (盛山 正仁, Moriyama Masahito) is a Japanese politician. He is a member of the ruling Liberal Democratic Party and a former member of the House of Representatives in the National Diet (national legislature). A native of Nishinomiya, Hyogo, and an alumnus of the University of Tokyo, he joined the Ministry of Transport in 1977. He was first elected to the House of Representatives in 2005 but lost his seat in the 2009 General Election, regaining it in 2012. During his time out of office, he matriculated as a postgraduate student and studied international law and business at Kobe University, which is located in his constituency. He earned a Master’s degree in Law in 2011, a PhD in International Law in 2013, and an additional PhD in Business Studies in 2014.

In 2024, Moriyama won a no-confidence motion issued by the Constitutional Democratic Party after reports emerged that he received a letter of recommendation and campaign support from an organization linked to the Unification Church during the 2021 Japanese general election.

On 10 April 2024, Moriyama was among the guests invited to the state dinner hosted by U.S. President Joe Biden in honor of Prime Minister Fumio Kishida at the White House.

Political offices
Preceded by Keiko Nagaoka	Minister of Education, Culture, Sports, Science and Technology; 2023–2024	Succeeded by Toshiko Abe
