= Masaaki Taira =

Japanese politician

- 平 将明
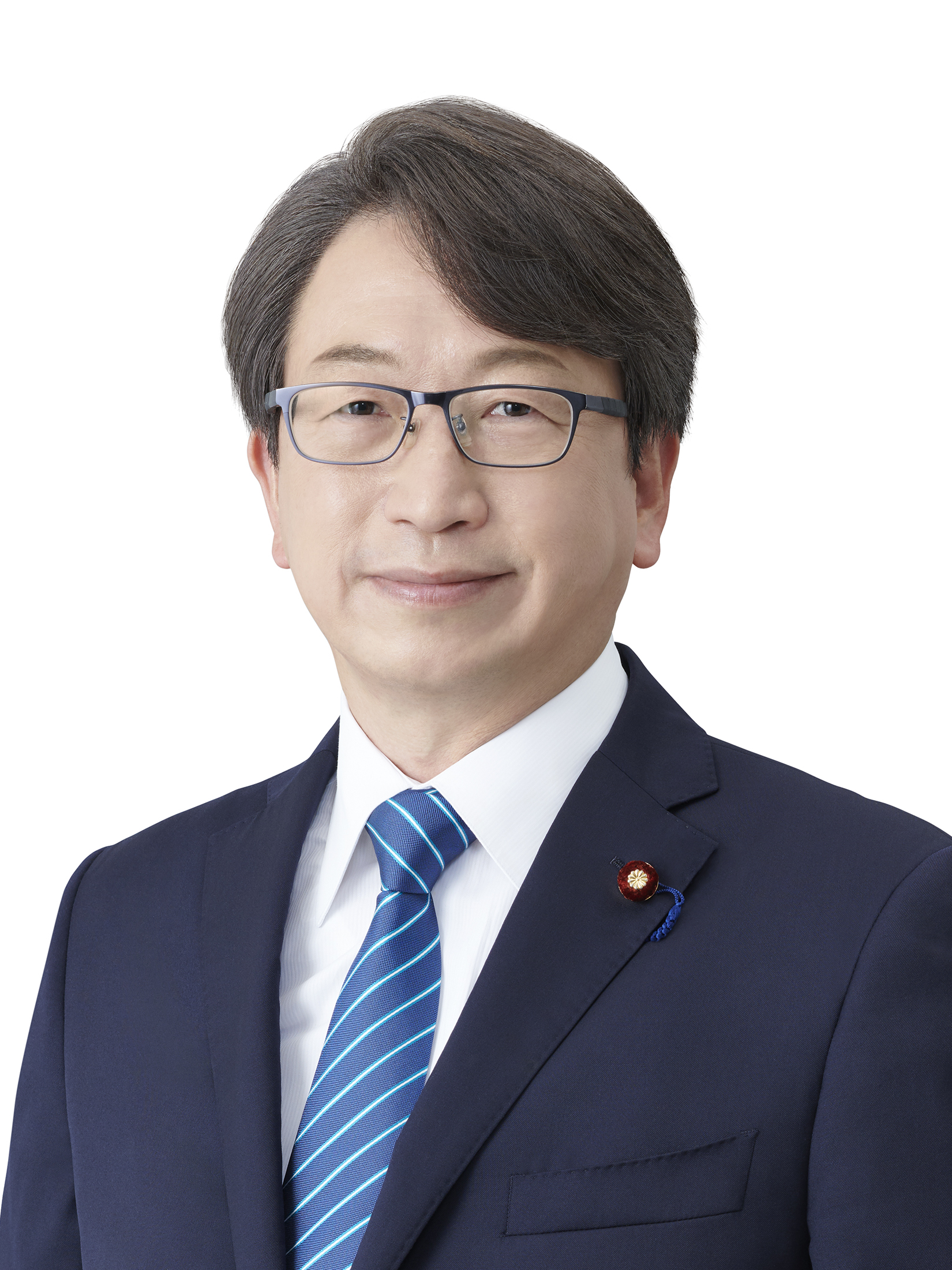
- Official portrait, 2024

Minister for Digital Transformation
- In office 1 October 2024 – 21 October 2025
- Prime Minister: Shigeru Ishiba
- Preceded by: Taro Kono
- Succeeded by: Hisashi Matsumoto

Member of the House of Representatives
- Incumbent
- Assumed office 11 September 2005
- Preceded by: Kazuyoshi Nakanishi
- Constituency: Tokyo 4th (2005–2009); Tokyo PR (2009–2012); Tokyo 4th (2012–present)

Personal details
- Born: 21 February 1967 (age 59) Tokyo, Japan
- Party: Liberal Democratic
- Education: Waseda University
- Website: www.taira-m.jp

Masaaki Taira (平 将明, Taira Masaaki; born 21 February 1967) is a Japanese politician who is a member of the House of Representatives since 2005.

== Political career ==
A member of the Liberal Democratic Party, Taira is served as the Minister for Digital Transformation in the Ishiba Cabinet from 2024 to 2025. He has previously held multiple senior party positions including Deputy Director of the Public Relations, Director of the Internet Media Bureau, and Director of the Information and Research Bureau.
