= Haneda, Ōta, Tokyo =

District of Ōta, Tokyo, Japan

Coordinates: 35.5487°N 139.7471°E

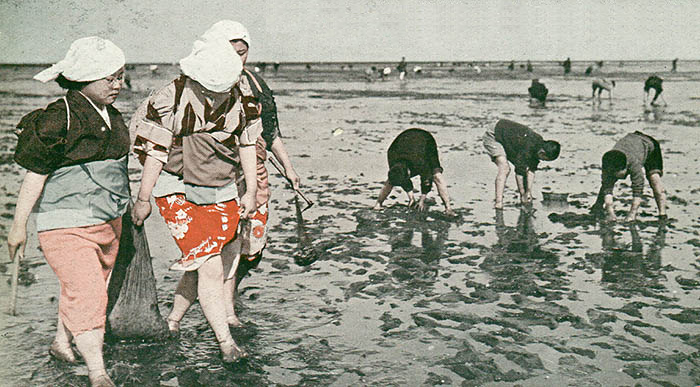
Clam digging in Haneda, 1937

Haneda (羽田, Haneda) is a district of Ōta, Tokyo, Japan. As of January 1, 2011, Haneda had a total population of 14,885. The district gives its name to Haneda Airport, the busiest airport in Japan by passenger traffic.

== History ==
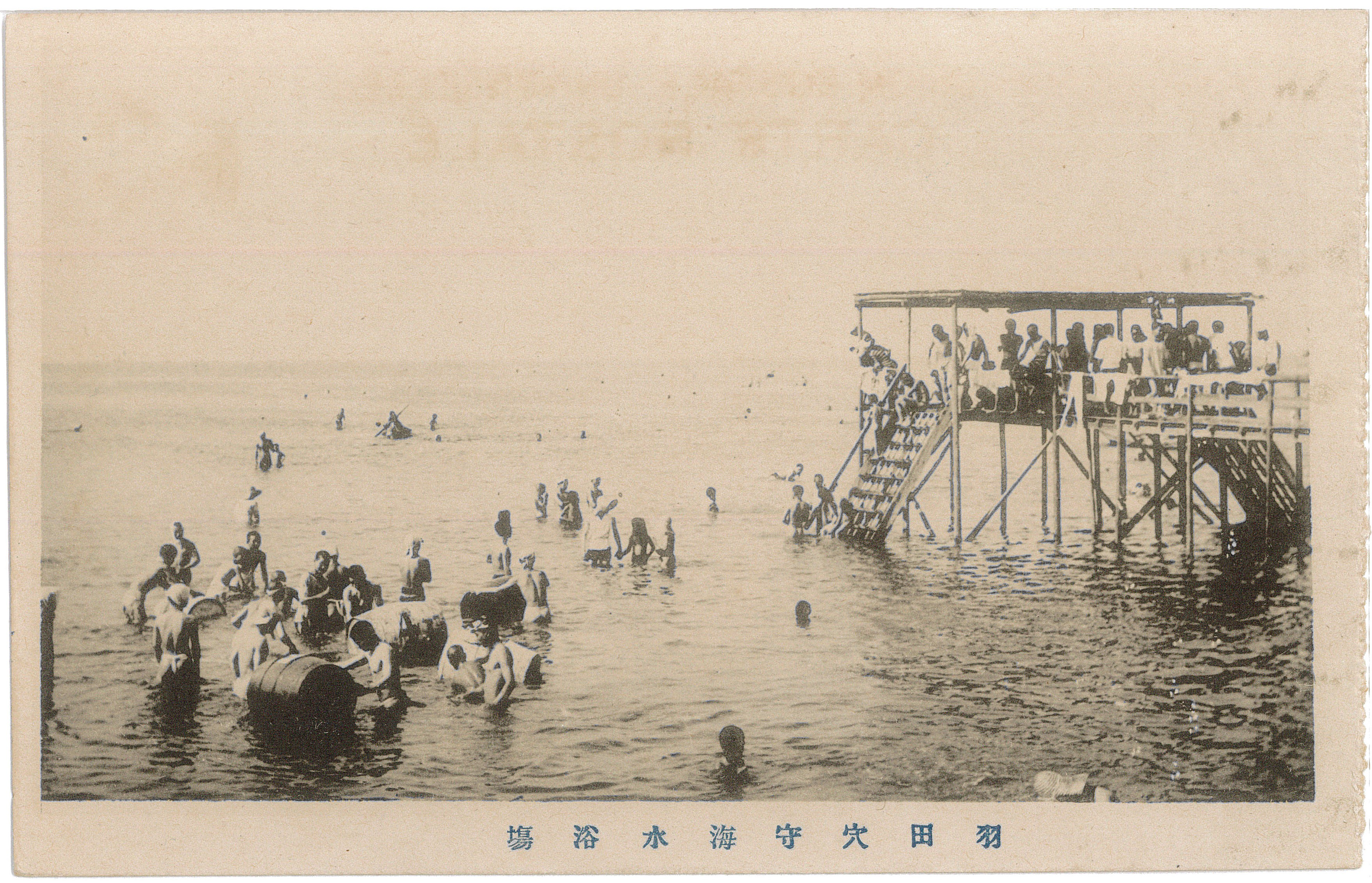
Haneda's Anamori Beach

Before the construction of Haneda Airport, the area was a prosperous mineral springs and beach resort centered around Anamori Shrine. In 1930, the Japanese postal ministry purchased a 53-hectare (130-acre) portion of reclaimed land in Tokyo Bay to the east of Haneda from a private individual in order to construct an airport. Haneda Airfield first opened in 1931 with a flight from the airport on August 25.

In 1932, the town of Haneda was merged into the newly created Tokyo City ward of Kamata, which was in turn merged with Ōmori to form Ōta in 1947.

== Climate ==
Climate data for Haneda, Ōta, Tokyo (1993−2020 normals, extremes 1993−present)
Month	Jan	Feb	Mar	Apr	May	Jun	Jul	Aug	Sep	Oct	Nov	Dec	Year
Record high °C (°F)	21.1 (70.0)	22.3 (72.1)	24.8 (76.6)	27.8 (82.0)	30.9 (87.6)	34.6 (94.3)	37.1 (98.8)	38.2 (100.8)	35.5 (95.9)	32.1 (89.8)	26.1 (79.0)	24.8 (76.6)	38.2 (100.8)
Mean daily maximum °C (°F)	9.8 (49.6)	10.4 (50.7)	13.7 (56.7)	18.5 (65.3)	22.9 (73.2)	25.5 (77.9)	29.5 (85.1)	31.2 (88.2)	27.2 (81.0)	21.9 (71.4)	16.9 (62.4)	12.3 (54.1)	20.0 (68.0)
Daily mean °C (°F)	6.3 (43.3)	6.8 (44.2)	9.8 (49.6)	14.5 (58.1)	19.0 (66.2)	22.0 (71.6)	25.8 (78.4)	27.4 (81.3)	24.0 (75.2)	18.9 (66.0)	13.8 (56.8)	8.9 (48.0)	16.4 (61.6)
Mean daily minimum °C (°F)	2.7 (36.9)	3.3 (37.9)	6.1 (43.0)	10.8 (51.4)	15.7 (60.3)	19.3 (66.7)	23.2 (73.8)	24.6 (76.3)	21.4 (70.5)	16.2 (61.2)	10.6 (51.1)	5.3 (41.5)	13.3 (55.9)
Record low °C (°F)	−2.4 (27.7)	−2.9 (26.8)	−0.2 (31.6)	0.1 (32.2)	9.2 (48.6)	12.1 (53.8)	17.2 (63.0)	17.9 (64.2)	13.1 (55.6)	8.9 (48.0)	1.5 (34.7)	−2.2 (28.0)	−2.9 (26.8)
Average precipitation mm (inches)	51.0 (2.01)	52.1 (2.05)	111.3 (4.38)	117.6 (4.63)	126.7 (4.99)	150.1 (5.91)	137.4 (5.41)	114.4 (4.50)	204.9 (8.07)	204.5 (8.05)	90.0 (3.54)	55.0 (2.17)	1,405.4 (55.33)
Average precipitation days (≥ 1.0 mm)	4.9	5.7	10.0	9.9	10.2	11.4	9.9	7.3	10.8	10.3	7.7	5.4	103.5
Source: JMA
