= Kōshirō Ishida =

Japanese politician (1930–2006)

- 石田 幸四郎
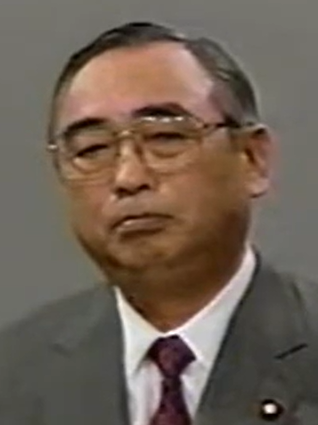
- Ishida in 1992

Chief Representative of Komeito
- In office 17 May 1989 – 24 December 1994
- Preceded by: Junya Yano
- Succeeded by: Tomio Fujii

Director-General of the Management and Coordination Agency
- In office 9 August 1993 – 30 June 1994
- Prime Minister: Morihiro Hosokawa; Tsutomu Hata
- Preceded by: Michihiko Kano
- Succeeded by: Tsuruo Yamaguchi

Member of the House of Representatives
- In office 10 December 1972 – 2 June 2000
- Preceded by: Kan'ichi Tsuji
- Succeeded by: Multi-member district
- Constituency: Aichi 6th (1972–1996); Tōkai PR (1996–2000)
- In office 29 January 1967 – 2 December 1969
- Preceded by: Constituency established
- Succeeded by: Isamu Akamatsu
- Constituency: Aichi 6th

Personal details
- Born: 22 August 1930 Sapporo, Hokkaido, Japan
- Died: 18 September 2006 (aged 76) Nagoya, Aichi, Japan
- Party: Kōmeitō
- Other political affiliations: NFP (1994–1998)
- Relatives: Tsugio Ishida (brother); Einosuke Akiya (brother-in-law)
- Education: Meiji University

Kōshirō Ishida (Japanese: 石田 幸四郎, Ishida Kōshirō; 22 August 1930 – 18 September 2006) was a Japanese politician who served as the fifth chairman of Komeito from 1989 to 1994, and also served as the leader of the New Komei breakaway party for its brief history.

== Early life ==
Ishida was born in Sapporo and graduated from Meiji University's business school, after which he worked at the advertising department of Seikyo Shimbun, the Soka Gakkai's official newspaper.

== Political career ==
On 29 January 1967, he won his first election through the old Aichi 6th district during the 1967 general election. He also became the vice chief secretary for Komeito through a temporary party convention, a role he would remain in for 19 years to come. In December 1986, after that year's general election, he assumed the role of vice chairman for Komeito.

=== Komei Party chairman ===
In May 1989, Ishida succeeded Junya Yano as Komeito's chairman after Yano resigned due to accusations of being involved in the Meidenkō scandal (which he denied).

On 18 February 1990, although Komeito had entered into an alliance with the Japan Socialist Party and Democratic Socialist Party for the 1990 general election, the overall results were a setback for Komeito as they had now fallen under 50 seats, and as a result, they ended this alliance. Thereafter, Komeito instead pursued cooperation with the Liberal Democratic Party. Komeito was intimately involved with Prime Minister Toshiki Kaifu's plans to give a $9 billion package intended as an aid to the US-led Gulf War. Komeito acted as a moderating influence on Kaifu's government, when, for instance, it promised to support passing the package on the strict condition that none of the money would be spent on arms or ammunitions, with Ishida stating that the anxiety the Japanese people felt about the war indicated that they shared Komeito's views towards defence policies.

In June 1993, Komeito voted in favour of the vote of no-confidence against the reshuffled Miyazawa cabinet, and on the 18th of July, Komeito rebounded to above 50 seats following the 1993 general election. Around this time, opposition forces were beginning to coalesce into a ruling coalition, but although some agitated for Komeito to enter into it, Ishida claimed that policy differences prevented this from happening immediately (Komeito favoured tax increases whereas the government did not, for instance), and on the 30th of July, there was an agreement to enter into a coalition government.

In August 1993, Ishida was appointed to head the Management and Coordination Agency (now the Ministry of Internal Affairs and Communications) under Prime Minister Hosokawa, making him the first Komeito leader to preside over a ruling government coalition. On 2 September 1993, Ishida met with the leaders of five business federations demanding government promotion of deregulation.

Complications ensued in the National Diet after this when, during a question and answer session held in the Budget Committee of the House of Representatives, LDP politicians Hiromu Nonaka and Shizuka Kamei requested a witness summons of Soka Gakkai's honorary leader Daisaku Ikeda.

In April 1994, Prime Minister Hosokawa resigned and Tsutomu Hata assumed the role in his stead, but Ishida remained in his cabinet position through this transition. In June of the same year, the short-lived Hata cabinet experienced mass resignations, after which the Liberal Democratic Party and Japan Socialist Party entered into a coalition to form a government under a new Prime Minister Tomiichi Murayama, sending Ishida and the Komeito back into the opposition.

=== New Komei Party ===
On 5 December 1994, Komeito split into the New Komei Party (composed primarily of House of Representatives members) and Komei (composed primarily of House of Councillors and local assembly members). Ishida led the New Komei faction throughout its brief history. Less than a month later on the 24th, New Komei merged with the New Frontier Party, for which Ishida was the deputy chief.

In preparation for the 1996 general election on the 20 October 1996, Ishida handed over his electoral power base to Jun Misawa, a former Chunichi Dragons pitcher and baseball commentator, and as a result, Misawa won Aichi's 4th district. From here on out, Ishida opted to run for the Tōkai proportional representation block, and was successfully reelected (this was done because the NFP, in principle, frowned upon running simultaneously for both a single-member district and a proportional representation seat at the same time).

In December 1997, Ishida joined the NFP faction known as the Kōyukai, but this intraparty forming of factions eventually lead to the NFP being dissolved. In February 1998, the "New Peace" party was formed, and Ishida became the standing advisor for this group. Later in November, Komeito finally reunited, and Ishida assumed office as the highest advisor for the party.

== Later life ==
Following the closing of the ordinary session of the Diet in June 2000, Ishida retired from politics, but remained as an honorary advisor for Komeito as well as in a managerial position for Soka Gakkai.
