= Kōji Harashima =

Japanese politician (1909–1964)

- 原島 宏治
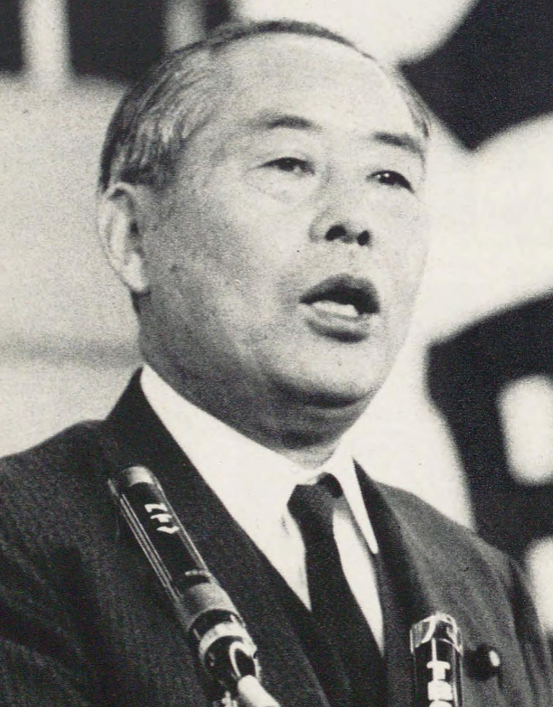
- Harashima in 1964

Chairman of Komeito
- In office 17 November 1964 – 9 December 1964
- Preceded by: Position established
- Succeeded by: Takehisa Tsuji

Member of the House of Councillors
- In office 2 June 1959 – 9 December 1964
- Constituency: National district

Member of the Ōta City Assembly
- In office April 1955 – June 1956

Personal details
- Born: 4 December 1909 Okutama, Tokyo, Japan
- Died: 9 December 1964 (aged 55)
- Party: Komeito (1962–1964)
- Other political affiliations: Independent (1955–1962)
- Education: Tokyo Gakugei University

Kōji Harashima (原島 宏治, Harashima Kōji; 4 December 1909 – 9 December 1964) was a Japanese politician and religious leader who briefly served as the first leader of Komeito, in addition to a serving as a board chairman for Soka Gakkai. He served in several other capacities throughout his career as well.

== Early life ==
Harashima was born on 4 December 1909 in Tokyo. In 1929, he graduated from Tokyo Prefectural Aoyama Normal School, which today is Tokyo Gakugei University. Harashima, like many who would later be involved in Soka Gakkai, started out as a school teacher. In 1940, he joined the Soka Gakkai Educational Society, which was the predecessor to the modern-day Soka Gakkai. This organisation was persecuted at the time of the war, but it has been said that when police came to Harashima in 1943, he subjected the police to shakubuku proselytisation.

== Political career ==
In 1955, he was elected to the local assembly for Tokyo's Ōta-ku ward. In the following year, he ran in the 1956 House of Councillors election, but did not get elected. However, he tried again in the 1959 House of Councillors election and succeeded, and would also go on to win the one after that. In the same year that Daisaku Ikeda became the third president of Soka Gakkai (1960), Harashima also became the third board chairman of Soka Gakkai, and it has been said that Harashima played a part in supporting Ikeda towards this obtaining this position. In 1961, as Harashima continued to play a central role in both the House of Councillors and the Tokyo Metropolitan Assembly, he also took part in the formation of the Komeito Political Alliance, the predecessor to the modern-day Komeito, serving as its founding chairman, and later on 1 July 1962, he assumed the role of Chief Secretary. This put Harashima in the most powerful political position within Soka Gakkai.

In the 17 March 1964 issue of Soka Gakkai's newspaper, Seikyo Shimbun, the lead article was written by Harashima and was entitled "Method of Propagation Differs Outside Japan." In this article, it was argued that the controversial shakubuku method of preaching shouldn't be used overseas as it has been in Japan. This mirrored a similar article on the same page of this issue entitled "No Shakubuku Abroad, President Ikeda says."

Eventually, on 2 November 1964, the Komeito headquarters (Komei Kaikan) were completed, and it was decided here that Harashima would become the first chairman of the political party that the group planned on launching soon. Harashima and others met with President Ikeda on 16 November, where it was decided that the restoration of diplomatic relations with the People's Republic of China would be one of Komeito's primary policy goals at the outset. A day later, on 17 November, the Komeito party was formed with Harashima as its first chairman as planned. Under his tenure, the party held an inaugural meeting in Tokyo in which the party's chief objective was declared to be the establishment of "a perpetual peace setup in the world from the standpoint of global racialism."

However, only a little while later on 9 December, he collapsed in his home from a heart attack, which has been attributed to overwork. About a week prior to his death, he told his eldest son Takashi that he "doesn't need honour, nor a high position–—however, there is only one thing that I hope for, and that is to be a member of the magnificent Nichiren Shōshū." Incidentally, although his son Takashi would eventually become the chief of Soka Gakkai's education department, he later became a critic of President Ikeda and his dictates, and as a result he later left Soka Gakkai entirely.
