= Takehisa Tsuji =

Japanese politician (1918–2012)

- 辻 武寿
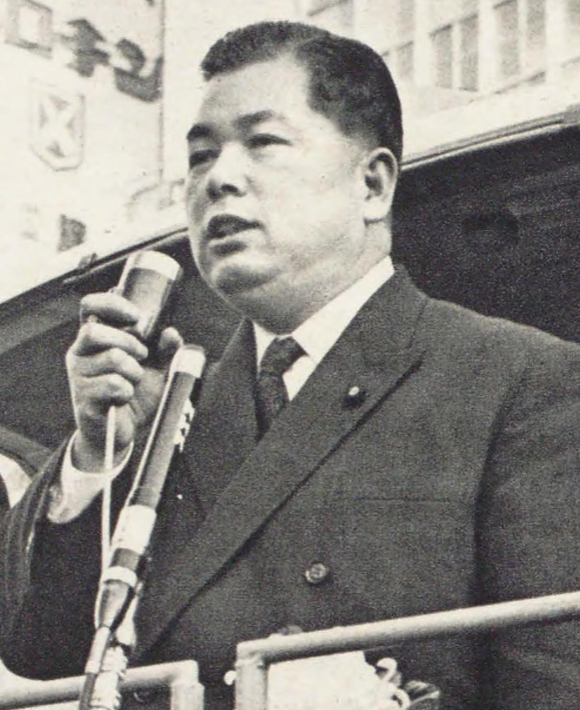
- Tsuji in 1967

Chairman of Komeito
- In office 9 December 1964 – 13 February 1967
- Preceded by: Kōji Harashima
- Succeeded by: Yoshikatsu Takeiri

Member of the House of Councillors
- In office 9 July 1956 – 7 July 1968
- Constituency: National district

Personal details
- Born: 3 April 1918 Saitama Prefecture, Japan
- Died: 30 April 2012 (aged 94)
- Party: Kōmeitō (1964–1968)
- Other political affiliations: Independent (1956–1964)
- Education: Tokyo Gakugei University

Takehisa Tsuji (Japanese: 辻 武寿, Tsuji Takehisa; 3 April 1918 – 30 April 2012) was a Japanese politician, religious leader, and elementary school teacher who served as the second leader of Komeito between 1964 and 1967.

Due to his longtime membership in the Soka Gakkai's earlier days, he became known, along with Kōji Harashima and Takashi Koizumi, as one of the "Kamata trio," referring to a location found in Ōta-ku ward, which is an important location to Soka Gakkai history. In addition to his time at Komeito, he was also a top leader in Soka Gakkai, even reaching the position of Vice President at one point. He was also involved with the Hokkekō lay organisation of mainstream Nichiren Shōshū.

== Early life ==
On 3 April 1918, Tsuji was born in Saitama prefecture. After graduating from the school which would later come to be known as Tokyo Gakugei University, he became a primary school teacher. After being introduced to Takashi Koizumi, who was another teacher, Tsuji joined the predecessor organisation to Soka Gakkai. After the war, Tsuji and Kōji Harashima founded the young man's department within Soka Gakkai, and thereafter Tsuji began to assume various important roles, such as being the chief of Soka Gakkai's leadership division as well as a director for Soka Gakkai.

== Political career ==
On 8 July 1956, Tsuji ran as an independent in the 1956 House of Councillors election from the national district, winning his first ever election in the process. Tsuji played a central role in the Komeito's predecessor organisation, the Komei Political Alliance, and on 17 November 1964, he played a part in the formation of Komeito, becoming its first vice-chairman. However, after the founding chairman Kōji Harashima died less than a month later, Tsuji became the party's second leader. Going into the 1965 House of Councillors election, Tsuji's Komeito fielded 14 candidates under the slogan of "vote for the new party and the new people."

1965, Tsuji stated that "efforts will be made to realize an international environment not necessitating a Japan-U.S. security setup." In a March 1966 Diet debate, Tsuji went somewhat against earlier Komeito policy in not advocating for the complete abolition of the US-Japan Security Treaty, instead supporting gradual abandonment of it. Although the party advocated for the immediate return of the Ryukyu Islands to Japan, Tsuji argued that sending the Japan Maritime Self-Defense Forces to the islands would be unconstitutional, instead advocating for the establishment of a subcommittee without the Budget Committee to handle the question of Ryukyuan defense.

After the party won 25 seats in the 1967 general election (the first general election in which the party took part), Tsuji resigned from his role as party chairman, being succeeded by Yoshikatsu Takeiri in that regard. He resigned from Komeito due to public scandals over the course of many years in which Soka Gakkai and Komeito were found to be colluding with each other to prevent the publication of literature which was critical of Soka Gakkai.

== Later life ==
After this, he returned his endeavours back over to Soka Gakkai, serving in a number of roles including vice president.

On 30 April 2012, Tsuji died of acute heart failure.
