= House of Councillors national district =

Defunct national electoral district for Japanese legislative upper house

The nationwide district (Japanese: 全国区, Hepburn: zenkoku-ku) was a 50-member electoral district for the House of Councillors, the upper house of the National Diet of Japan, from 1947 to 1980. It consisted of the whole country. In staggered elections, it elected 100 of the 250 members of the House of Councillors by single non-transferable vote (SNTV). In an SNTV/SNTV parallel system, the other 150 members were also elected by SNTV, but in more decisive, lower-magnitude districts contiguous with the 47 prefectures, several of them single-member districts where SNTV is equivalent to first-past-the-post.

In the 1983 regular election, the national district was replaced with the proportional district which is equally nationwide, but is often just called proportional district (hirei-ku) to avoid ambiguity. It elects the same number of members, but now in a proportional system from party lists. By 1986, the directly elected members from the national district were replaced by proportional party list members in both classes of the House of Councillors.

== Highest and lowest-ranking winners ==
In the 1968 election, writer Shintarō Ishihara garnered more than 3 million votes, the all-time record. He stood as candidate for the Liberal Democratic Party; but unlike the current proportional preference system, where every preference vote for a candidate in the proportional district also counts towards the party total in the overall allocation of the proportional seats, high personal vote totals in the national district did not immediately benefit the party beyond the prestige of taking the top spot.

On the other end of the winner list, the number of votes necessary to obtain a seat was around 150,000 in the immediate postwar years. Under the 1955 party system, more than 250,000 votes were needed to win a seat. By the 1970s when the baby boomers had entered the electorate, it took more than half a million votes for a candidate to be elected.

Note: In many regular election years, including the 1st regular election of 1947 when all members had to be elected at once, the election was combined with a by-election to the class not up into one SNTV election. The top 50 members would always be elected for the full six year-term. If there were x vacancies in the other class, the 51st to (50+x)th ranking candidates would be elected to fill the vacant seats for the remaining 3-year term.

First and last winners in the House of Councillors nationwide district and their votes
Regular election		Leading candidate		Second winner		Last, 50th winner for a full term		Last winner for a 3-year-term		
1st (1947)		Hajime Hoshi (D)	487,612	Sōzaemon Yanagawa (I/R)	480,927	Aisuke Okamoto (I/R)	123,679	#100	Jun'ichi Kunii (D)	68,128
	2nd (1950)	Yamakawa Ryōichi (R)	610,611	Masao Takagi (R)	610,025	Yasoichi Mori (R)	150,244	#56	Yutaka Terao (L)	144,524
3rd (1953)		Kazushige Ugaki (R)	513,863	Yukio Kagayama (I)	494,543	Yoshio Ōtani (L)	162,624	#53	Yoshio Kusumi (R) (election later invalidated)	159,762
	4th (1956)	Shizue Katō (S)	750,232	Masato Katō (I/R)	462,780	Seiji Uchimura (S)	254,137	#52	Hideo Konishi (L	240,711
5th (1959)		Masufumi Yoneda (L)	941,053	Morinosuke Kajima (L)	931,726	Masatoshi Tokunaga (L)	276,000	#52	Nagatoshi Mukai (S)	266,150
	6th (1962)	Aki Fujiwara (L)	1,165,046	Shizue Katō (S)	1,110,024	Shūitsu Matsumura (L)	382,149	#51	Takematsu Abe (S)	376,901
7th (1965)		Morinosuke Kajima (L)	1,014,545	Shōichi Kasuga (C)	875,093	Shigeyoshi Kajiwara (L)	443,891	#52	Shigeru Ishimoto (I)	439,909
	8th (1968)	Shintarō Ishihara (L)	3,012,552	Yukio Aoshima (I)	1,203,431	Shōichi Yokokawa (S)	477,493	#51	Mitsuru Kitamura (S)	461,500
9th (1971)		Hideo Den (S)	1,921,640	Aiko Anzai (L)	1,491,669	Danshi Tatekawa (I)	443,854	–		
	10th (1974)	Teru Miyata (L)	2,595,236	Ichikawa Fusae (I/2Club)	1,938,169	Toshio Komaki (C)	575,110	#54	Chūkō Kondō (C)	573,211
11th (1977)		Hideo Den (S)	1,587,262	Satsuki Eda (SCF)	1,392,475	Atsushi Akiyama (S)	582,847	–		
	12th (1980)	Ichikawa Fusae (I/2Club)	2,784,998	Yukio Aoshima (I/2Club)	2,247,157	Shizuo Wada (S)	642,554	–		
