= Junya Yano =

Japanese politician (born 1932)

- 矢野 絢也
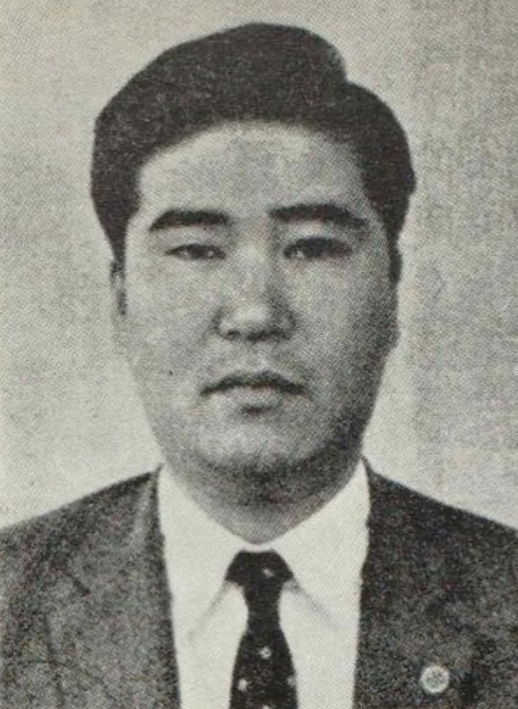
- Yano c. 1967

Chairman of Komeito
- In office 5 December 1986 – 21 May 1989
- Preceded by: Yoshikatsu Takeiri
- Succeeded by: Kōshirō Ishida

Member of the House of Representatives
- In office 29 January 1967 – 18 June 1993
- Preceded by: Reikō Kuriyama
- Succeeded by: Tetsuji Kubo
- Constituency: Osaka 4th

Member of the Osaka Prefectural Assembly
- In office 30 April 1963 – 8 January 1967
- Constituency: Ikuno Ward, Osaka City

Personal details
- Born: 27 April 1932 (age 94) Yao, Osaka, Japan
- Party: Independent
- Other political affiliations: Kōmeitō (until 1993)
- Education: Kyoto University

Jun'ya Yano (矢野 絢也, Yano Junya; born 27 April 1932) is a retired Japanese politician and political commentator who served as the fourth leader of Komeito between 1986 and 1989. Over a decade after leaving politics, Yano has become a notable critic of the party and its religious partner Soka Gakkai.

== Early life and education ==
Yona was born in Yao, Osaka, Osaka, and graduated from Osaka Prefectural Yamamoto High School. He later attended Kyoto University's economics department for three years, where he graduated in March 1955. In the following month, he began working for Obayashi Corporation.

== Political career ==
In 1963, he was elected for the first time as a member of the Osaka Prefectural Assembly from Osaka's Ikuno ward. He stood as a Komeito candidate for the former Osaka 4th district in the 1967 general election and landed in first place with 75,775 votes, or 16.9% of the ballots. He was appointed secretary general of Komeito following a provisional party convention almost immediately after the election.

In 1970, Yano founded the "Society for the Creation of a New Japan" with Japan Socialist Party secretary general Saburō Eda and Democratic Socialist Party secretary general Ryosaku Sasaki. This was conceived as a plan in which the three parties might come to power through a coalition government. Further talks of cooperation occurred the following year, as well as in 1976, when Japan Socialist Party leader Saburō Eda formed the Society for Thinking of a New Japan organisation with Komeito and the Democratic Socialist Party.

In 1981, when Yano was the party's secretary-general, he echoed Komeito and chairman Yoshikatsu Takeiri's shift away from a stringently dovish foreign policy towards accepting the legitimacy of the Japan Self-Defense Forces by arguing that the Soviet Union's military power had become excessive and was now a genuine threat to world peace.

In December 1986, Yona succeeded Yoshikatsu Takeiri, for whom Yona had worked closely for 20 years. In 1987, when the Diet voted for Prime Minister, Yano recommended voting for Takako Doi as an opposition unity candidate. However, she lost to the LDP's Noboru Takeshita by a healthy margin of 154 votes.

In March 1987, Yano met Chinese premier Deng Xiaoping in China, where the two discussed matters relating to the two country's talks of a possible peace treaty, which would later become the Treaty of Peace and Friendship between Japan and China by the end of the year. However, Deng expressed a number of strong criticisms of the Japanese side during these talks, and Japanese authorities were reportedly upset that Deng was willing to discuss these issues with an opposition politician such as Yano instead of with the Japan Defense Agency director-general, who was in China at the time.

In 1988, Yano denied allegations that his party had kicked out maverick lawmaker Toshio Ohashi, who had accused Soka Gakkai and Daisaku Ikeda of asserting excessive control over Komeito, as a means of crushing dissent, instead arguing alongside other party leaders that he was removed because he had been found accepting bribes as high as $264,000 (in 1988 USD, as reported by AP News), as well as for womanising behaviour.

In January 1987, there was some suspicion that Yano's former secretary was among those implicated in the so-called Meidenko incident, which involved a purchase of 1 billion yen stock being sold by the company. Yano denied any involvement of himself or of his secretary. Later on in May, the Asahi Shimbun pursued suspicions that 200 million yen had been exchanged at Yano's home in connection with the stock trading of a company affiliated with Meidenko. Yano denied the allegations. On 10 December 1988, Yano filed a complaint against the Asahi Shinbun for libel, but withdrew it on 23 March 1989.

=== Meidenkō scandal ===
Yano admitted at a press conference that he exchanged 200 million yen in cash with Atsushi Ishida, the former managing director of Meidenko, at Yano's home, but insisted that Yano was only a mediator in the transaction. In May 1989, the Asahi published a statement by Kogo Nakase, a former Meidenko advisor, in which he claimed that the transaction was direct and not a mediation. Yano steadfastly denied this, calling it an "unfounded and trumped-up remark founded upon malice". The Asahi Shinbun became to publish writings in which they asked whether Yano should resign.

In 1989, shortly after the first allegations against Yano, the notorious Recruit scandal struck. Although it mainly concerned the ruling Liberal Democratic Party, members of other parties were implicated, and Yano announced his intention to resign after a Komeito lawmaker named Katsuya Ikeda was accused of being involved in the scandal. Yano finally resigned on 17 May from his position and became a chief advisor to the party instead.

After a few more years, without even attempting to run for the 1993 general election, Yano retired from the world of politics in June of that year. In October of the same year, he announced the publication of a report entitled the "Secret Memo for All to See" to Bungei Shunjū magazine, for which he obtained the Bungeishunju Reader Award. With this, he switched over to becoming a political commentator.

After leaving Komeito, Yano has been in several legal troubles. A litigation battle was fought with his former Soka Gakkai and Komeito colleagues, but in February 2012, both sides accepted a court settlement, and Soka Gakkai withdrew three cases and Yano withdrew one.

In 2005, three former Komeito parliamentarians found out that they were accused of stealing Yano's notebooks. They sued Yano and others involved in the magazine publication of the claims. In December 2007, the Tokyo District Court ruled in the parliamentarians' favour by awarding them with 6.6 million yen in damages, and also required the publisher (Kodansha) and Yano to place an apology advertisement.

== Later life ==
As a result of his legal accusations against Soka Gakkai, Yano left the group on 1 May 2008, saying that the religious organisation "has strong political influence" and that he "cannot overlook its antisocial behavior anymore".

On 3 November 2010, he received the Grand Cordon of the Order of the Rising Sun.

On 11 March 2015, he helped to co-found Satoyama / Sōmō no Kai, a political organisation that focused on issues such as regional revitalisation and solving income inequality. Some of its other co-founders were former prime ministers Tomiichi Murayama and Yukio Hatoyama, as well as prominent politicians Hirohisa Fujii, Masakuni Murakami, and Taku Yamasaki.

== Controversies ==
After leaving Komeito, Yano became embroiled in multiple legal proceedings. A litigation battle was fought with former Soka Gakkai and Komeito executives, but in February 2012, both sides accepted a court recommendation that resulted in Soka Gakkai withdrawing three of its cases and Yano withdrawing one of his.

=== The "black notebook" case ===
In an article published in the Shūkan Gendai magazine on 6 August 2005, three Sokkai Gakkai members and former Komeito politicians were accused by Yano of having threatened him and forcibly searched Yano's entire home without his permission in order to steal some 100 "black notebooks" from his house, all of which contained private "observations and behind-the-scenes details" over his 30 years in the House of Representatives. The three defendants argued that there was no coercion and that the notebooks were obtained with permission from Yano. In December 2007, the Tokyo District Court found Yano's claims to be unfounded, and as a result it ordered Shūkan Gendai, its publisher Kodansha, and Yano to pay ¥6,600,000 in damages and to publish an apology.

This was appealed, and, in 2009, the Tokyo High Court accepted the appeal and did not recognise Yano's actions as defamation. The Supreme Court's Third Petty Bench further confirmed the appeal and recognised Yano's claim of invasion of privacy and order the notebooks to be returned.

=== Critic activities ===
In 2008, Yano filed a ¥55,000,000 suit against Soka Gakkai after the former claimed to have been threatened to cease publishing his critiques in a private meeting with Soka Gakkai executives back in May 2005. He also claimed that Soka Gakkai had been monitoring his activities and tried forcing Yano to sell his home in order to make a donation of 200-300 million yen for the group.

On 20 May 2008, the then-Vice Chairman of Soka Gakkai, Yoshiki Tanigawa, filed a lawsuit against Yano after an article was published by Shinchosha in the weekly Shukan Shincho which accused Tanigawa of threatening Yano. Tanigawa claimed that the charge was completely false, and his lawsuit against Yano requested ¥11,000,000 in damages and a published apology advertisement in the magazine and national newspapers. On 20 January 2011, the Tokyo District Court ordered Yano, Shukan Shincho, and the editor-in-chief Hayase to pay ¥330,000 in damages.

On 13 June 2008, the Democratic Party and People's New Party invited Yano as a witness to discuss the relationship between Soka Gakkai and Komeito, as well as to describe the harassment he has claimed to experience from Soka Gakkai ever since he began to criticise the organisation. This move was criticised by Komeito, and LDP lawmaker Isao Iijima also criticised the move.

=== Alma mater fraud ===
In an article by the monthly magazine Business World Nippon (Zaikai Nippon), Yano was accused of fraud. The article introduces suspicions that Yano had "stolen" ¥2,000,000 which was supposed to go towards repairing the tennis courts of his alma mater, Yamamoto High School, all the way back in 1977, when he was a member of the high school's alumni association. Yano sued the publisher of this magazine in December 2006 for damages. A court investigation found that the core element of the Business World Nippon article, disregarding peripheral details, was true, and that Yano's counter-claims lacked evidence, and dismissed all of them on 26 August 2009.

== Works ==
- 二重権力・闇の流れ. 文藝春秋. 1994. ISBN 978-4163492100.
- 黒い手帖—創価学会「日本占領計画」の全記録. 講談社. 2009. ISBN 978-4062152723.
- 「黒い手帖」裁判全記録. 講談社. 2009. ISBN 978-4062156370.
- 乱脈経理—創価学会VS.国税庁の暗闘ドキュメント. 講談社. 2011. ISBN 978-4062172318.
