= 1968 Japanese House of Councillors election =

- 7 July 1968

126 of the 250 seats in the House of Councillors 126 seats needed for a majority

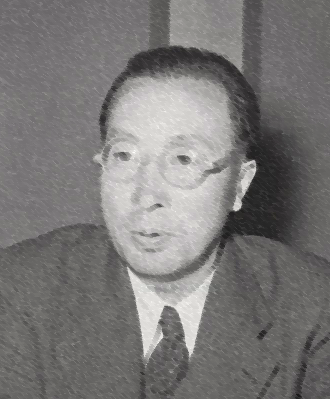

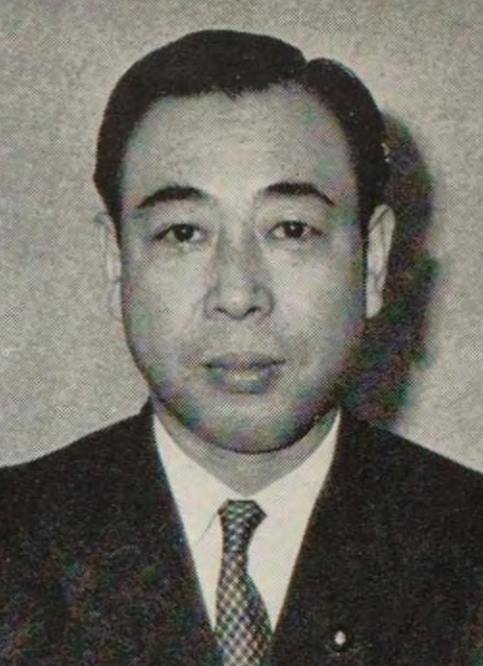

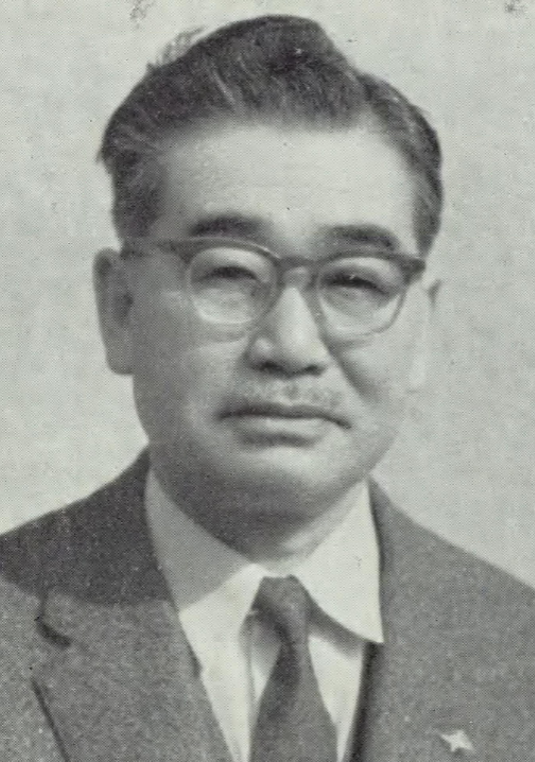
| | First party | Second party | Third party |
|---|---|---|---|
| Leader | Eisaku Satō | Seiichi Katsumata | Yoshikatsu Takeiri |
| Party | LDP | Socialist | Kōmeitō |
| Seats after | 137 | 65 | 24 |
| Seat change | ▼3 | ▼8 | ▲4 |
| Popular vote | 20,120,089 | 8,542,199 | 6,656,771 |
| Percentage | 46.7% | 19.8% | 15.5% |
| Swing | ▼0.5% | ▼3.6% | ▲1.8% |
| | Fourth party | Fifth party |
| Leader | Eiichi Nishimura | Kenji Miyamoto |
| Party | Democratic Socialist | JCP |
| Seats after | 10 | 7 |
| Seat change | ▲3 | ▲3 |
| Popular vote | 2,578,581 | 2,146,879 |
| Percentage | 6.0% | 5.0% |
| Swing | ▲0.1% | ▲0.6% |
- Results of the election, showing the winning candidates in each prefecture and the national block.
President of the House of Councillors before election
Kenzō Kōno
LDP
President of the House of Councillors-designate
Ken Yasui
LDP

House of Councillors elections were held in Japan on 7 July 1968, electing half the seats in the House. The Liberal Democratic Party won the most seats, although this marked the first House of Councillors election in the LDP's history in which its share of the popular vote decreased when compared to the election prior to it.

== Results ==
| Party | National | | | Constituency | | | Seats | | | |
| Party | Votes | % | Seats | Votes | % | Seats | Not up | Won | Total after | +/– |
|---|---|---|---|---|---|---|---|---|---|---|
| Liberal Democratic Party | 20,120,089 | 46.71 | 21 | 19,405,546 | 44.86 | 48 | 68 | 69 | 137 | –3 |
| Japan Socialist Party | 8,542,199 | 19.83 | 12 | 12,617,680 | 29.17 | 16 | 37 | 28 | 65 | –8 |
| Komeitō | 6,656,771 | 15.45 | 9 | 2,632,528 | 6.09 | 4 | 11 | 13 | 24 | +4 |
| Democratic Socialist Party | 2,578,581 | 5.99 | 4 | 3,010,089 | 6.96 | 3 | 3 | 7 | 10 | +3 |
| Japanese Communist Party | 2,146,879 | 4.98 | 3 | 3,577,179 | 8.27 | 1 | 3 | 4 | 7 | +3 |
| Other parties | 157,501 | 0.37 | 0 | 106,587 | 0.25 | 0 | 0 | 0 | 0 | 0 |
| Independents | 2,872,279 | 6.67 | 2 | 1,910,371 | 4.42 | 3 | 2 | 5 | 7 | 0 |
| Total | 43,074,299 | 100.00 | 51 | 43,259,980 | 100.00 | 75 | 124 | 126 | 250 | –1 |
| Valid votes | 43,074,299 | 94.84 | | 43,259,980 | 95.24 | | | | | |
| Invalid/blank votes | 2,343,354 | 5.16 | | 2,161,083 | 4.76 | | | | | |
| Total votes | 45,417,653 | 100.00 | | 45,421,063 | 100.00 | | | | | |
| Registered voters/turnout | 65,886,145 | 68.93 | | 65,886,145 | 68.94 | | | | | |
Source: Ministry of Internal Affairs and Communications, National Diet

=== By constituency ===
| Constituency | Total seats | Seats won | | | | | |
| Constituency | Total seats | LDP | JSP | Kōmeitō | DSP | JCP | Ind. |
|---|---|---|---|---|---|---|---|
| Aichi | 3 | 1 | 1 | 1 | | | |
| Akita | 1 | 1 | | | | | |
| Aomori | 1 | | | | | | 1 |
| Chiba | 2 | 2 | | | | | |
| Ehime | 1 | 1 | | | | | |
| Fukui | 1 | 1 | | | | | |
| Fukuoka | 3 | 2 | 1 | | | | |
| Fukushima | 2 | 2 | | | | | |
| Gifu | 1 | 1 | | | | | |
| Gunma | 2 | 2 | | | | | |
| Hiroshima | 2 | 1 | 1 | | | | |
| Hokkaido | 4 | 2 | 2 | | | | |
| Hyōgo | 3 | | 1 | 1 | 1 | | |
| Ibaraki | 2 | 1 | 1 | | | | |
| Ishikawa | 1 | | | | | | 1 |
| Iwate | 1 | 1 | | | | | |
| Kagawa | 1 | 1 | | | | | |
| Kagoshima | 2 | 2 | | | | | |
| Kanagawa | 2 | 1 | 1 | | | | |
| Kōchi | 1 | 1 | | | | | |
| Kumamoto | 2 | 2 | | | | | |
| Kyoto | 2 | 1 | | | | 1 | |
| Mie | 1 | 1 | | | | | |
| Miyagi | 1 | 1 | | | | | |
| Miyazaki | 1 | 1 | | | | | |
| Nagano | 2 | 1 | 1 | | | | |
| Nagasaki | 1 | 1 | | | | | |
| Nara | 1 | 1 | | | | | |
| Niigata | 2 | | 1 | | | | 1 |
| Ōita | 1 | 1 | | | | | |
| Okayama | 2 | 1 | 1 | | | | |
| Osaka | 3 | 1 | | 1 | 1 | | |
| Saga | 1 | 1 | | | | | |
| Saitama | 2 | 1 | 1 | | | | |
| Shiga | 1 | | 1 | | | | |
| Shimane | 1 | 1 | | | | | |
| Shizuoka | 2 | 2 | | | | | |
| Tochigi | 2 | 2 | | | | | |
| Tokushima | 1 | 1 | | | | | |
| Tokyo | 4 | 1 | 1 | 1 | 1 | | |
| Tottori | 1 | | 1 | | | | |
| Toyama | 1 | | 1 | | | | |
| Wakayama | 1 | 1 | | | | | |
| Yamagata | 1 | 1 | | | | | |
| Yamaguchi | 1 | 1 | | | | | |
| Yamanashi | 1 | 1 | | | | | |
| National | 51 | 21 | 12 | 9 | 4 | 3 | 2 |
| Total | 127 | 69 | 28 | 13 | 7 | 4 | 5 |
