= 1990 Japanese general election =

- 18 February 1990

All 512 seats in the House of Representatives 257 seats needed for a majority
- Turnout: 73.31% (▲1.89pp)
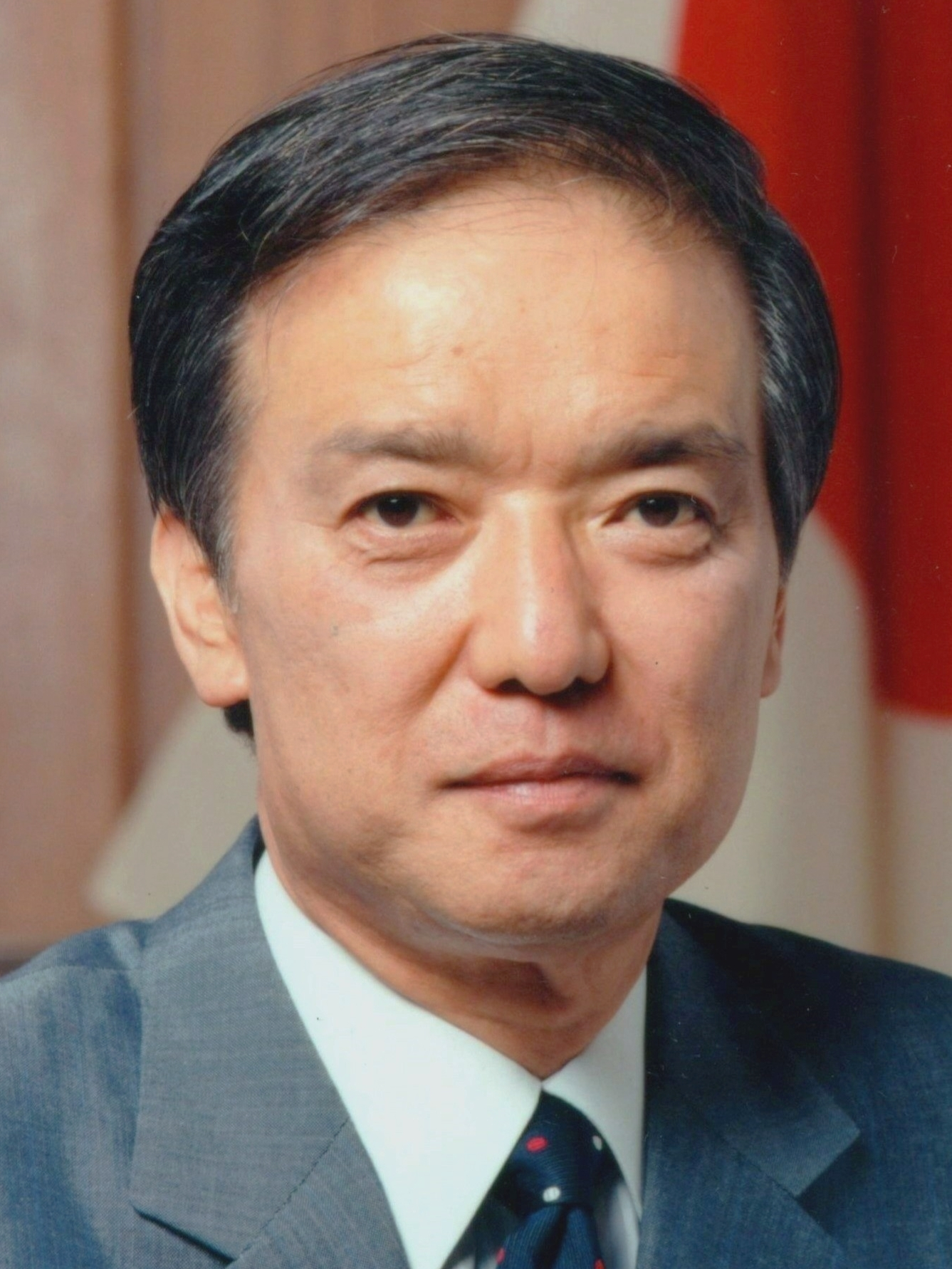

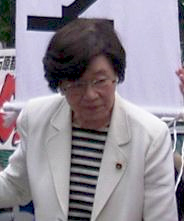

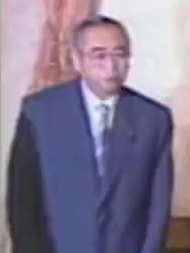

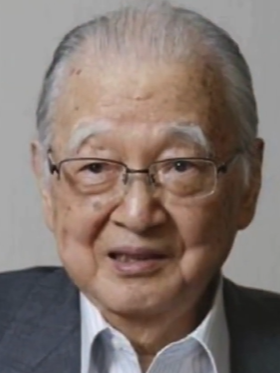

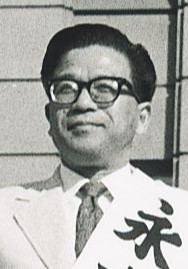

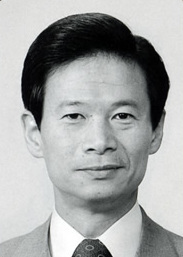
	First party	Second party	Third party
Leader	Toshiki Kaifu	Takako Doi	Koshiro Ishida
Party	LDP	Socialist	Kōmeitō
Last election	51.06%, 306 seats (Note: Liberal Democratic Party and New Liberal Club)	17.23%, 85 seats	9.43%, 56 seats
Seats won	275	136	45
Seat change	▼31	▲51	▼11
Popular vote	30,315,417	16,025,473	5,242,675
Percentage	46.14%	24.35%	7.98%
Swing	▼3.28pp	▲7.12pp	▼1.45pp
	Fourth party	Fifth party	Sixth party
Leader	Tetsuzo Fuwa	Eiichi Nagasue	Satsuki Eda
Party	JCP	Democratic Socialist	Socialist Democratic
Last election	8.79%, 26 seats	6.44%, 26 seats	0.83%, 4 seats
Seats won	16	14	4
Seat change	▼10	▼12	Steady
Popular vote	5,226,987	3,178,949	566,957
Percentage	7.96%	4.84%	0.86%
Swing	▼0.83pp	▼1.60pp	▲0.03pp
	Seventh party
Leader	Seiichi Tagawa
Party	Progressive
Last election	–
Seats won	1
Seat change	New
Popular vote	281,793
Percentage	0.43%
Swing	New
Prime Minister before election
Toshiki Kaifu
LDP
Elected Prime Minister
Toshiki Kaifu
LDP

General elections were held in Japan on 18 February 1990 to elect the 512 members of the House of Representatives, the lower house of the National Diet.

== Background ==
As with the previous House of Councillors election, the "four-point set of evils" in the minds of voters were the controversial consumption tax, the Recruit scandal, agricultural import liberalisation, and former Prime Minister Sōsuke Uno's sex scandal. Political commentators excitedly speculated whether a "Great Reversal" would finally come about in which the LDP loses its majority in the House of Representatives, as the prior 1989 election saw the LDP lose its long-held majority in the House of Councillors.

== Results ==
Party	Votes	%	Seats	+/–
Liberal Democratic Party	30,315,417	46.14	275	−31
Japan Socialist Party	16,025,473	24.39	136	+51
Kōmeitō	5,242,675	7.98	45	−11
Japanese Communist Party	5,226,987	7.96	16	−10
Democratic Socialist Party	3,178,949	4.84	14	−12
Socialist Democratic Federation	566,957	0.86	4	0
Progressive Party	281,793	0.43	1	New
Other parties	58,536	0.09	0	–
Independents	4,807,524	7.32	21	+12
Total	65,704,311	100.00	512	0
Valid votes	65,704,311	99.23		
Invalid/blank votes	511,595	0.77		
Total votes	66,215,906	100.00		
Registered voters/turnout	90,322,908	73.31		
Source: IPU

Seats won per district

=== By prefecture ===
Prefecture	Total seats	Seats won							
Prefecture	Total seats	LDP	JSP	Kōmeitō	JCP	DSP	SDF	PP	Ind.
Aichi	22	11	6	2		2			1
Akita	7	4	2						1
Aomori	7	5	2						
Chiba	18	12	5	1					
Ehime	9	6	3						
Fukui	4	3	1						
Fukuoka	19	8	4	4	2		1		
Fukushima	12	6	5						1
Gifu	9	6	2	1					
Gunma	10	6	3						1
Hiroshima	12	8	3			1			
Hokkaido	23	12	7	1	1	1			1
Hyōgo	19	10	4	2					3
Ibaraki	12	8	3	1					
Ishikawa	5	4	1						
Iwate	8	4	3			1			
Kagawa	6	4	2						
Kagoshima	10	5	4						1
Kanagawa	20	9	6	4				1	
Kōchi	5	2	1	1	1				
Kumamoto	10	6	2	1					1
Kyoto	10	4	2	2	1	1			
Mie	9	5	2			1			1
Miyagi	9	6	3						
Miyazaki	6	3	2			1			
Nagano	13	8	4		1				
Nagasaki	9	5	2			1			1
Nara	5	2	1	1	1				
Niigata	13	8	4						1
Ōita	7	4	2						1
Okayama	10	4	2	2			1		1
Okinawa	5	2	1	1	1				
Osaka	27	8	5	7	5	1			1
Saga	5	3	1						1
Saitama	17	8	5	2		1			1
Shiga	5	3	1			1			
Shimane	5	3	1						1
Shizuoka	14	10	3	1					
Tochigi	10	6	3			1			
Tokushima	5	2	2	1					
Tokyo	44	18	11	8	3	1	1		2
Tottori	4	2	2						
Toyama	6	4	2						
Wakayama	6	4	1	1					
Yamagata	7	5	1				1		
Yamaguchi	9	6	2	1					
Yamanashi	5	3	2						
Total	512	275	136	45	16	14	4	1	21

== Analysis ==
Although the LDP lost a net total of 25 seats, it still held onto its majority in the House of Representatives with a margin of 19 seats. This was due to the inequitable districting practices in Japan at the time, as individual voters in rural districts tend to both favour the LDP and also be disproportionately influential. However, the LDP did see losses among rural voters in the 1989 elections, and as a result the party pivoted away from their commitment to liberal import policies and back into a more protectionist rhetoric, declaring that "not one grain of foreign rice will be imported into Japan." The LDP also acquiesced by revising the consumption tax law to allow for exceptions; moreover, public resistance to the new tax had slightly decreased since the 1989 Upper House election. Although party leadership tends to have only minor influence on Japanese elections, positive cabinet approval ratings for the LDP bounced back from Noboru Takeshita's low of 10% to the reform-minded Toshiki Kaifu's 33%. In addition, the LDP also made sure to field an ample amount of candidates and to informally support independents, who increased by 12 in this election.

The clear winner in the elections was the Japan Socialist Party, whose number of seats rose by 51 and whose popular vote rose by 7.12% from the last election. This was the JSP's strongest performance in a general election since 1967, and left it as the only party to gain any seats. Meanwhile, the other three main opposition parties (Komeito, the JCP, and the DSP) lost 11, 10, and 12 seats respectively, and all of them also saw reductions in their popular vote. According to surveys, however, the shift in support for the JSP was more to do with the familiar Japanese tendency to cast protest votes against the LDP rather than expressions of support for all of the opposition's platform. Moreover, the JSP continued to suffer from factional infighting and a relative lack of fund-raising when compared to the LDP, and thus its fortunes would only wind up being in the short-term.
