= Kōmeitō (1962–1998) =

Former political party in Japan

Kōmeitō 公明党
- Founder: Daisaku Ikeda
- Founded: November 17, 1964
- Dissolved: November 7, 1998
- Preceded by: Clean Government League
- Succeeded by: New Komeito
- Ideology: Buddhist democracy; Anti-communism
- Political position: Centre-left to centre-right
- Religion: Buddhism (Soka Gakkai)
- Colours: Orange (official); Yellow (customary)

The Kōmeitō (Japanese: 公明党), also known as Kōmei Seiji Renmei, the Kōmei Party, and Clean Government Party (CGP), was a political party in Japan, initiated by Daisaku Ikeda, and described by various authors as the "political arm" of Soka Gakkai. Kōmeitō was considered a centrist, as well as centre-left, political party of the progressive camp until the 1990s. Its successor party Komeito had become politically closer to the centre-right to right-wing Liberal Democratic Party (LDP) and became a centre-to-centre-right conservative party. This ended in 2026 when Komeito merged with the Constitutional Democratic Party of Japan to become the Centrist Reform Alliance. (Note: Only in the lower house, the House of Representatives.)

== History ==
The party was established in January 1962 as the Kōmei Seiji Renmei (Clean Government League) by the Sōka Gakkai, an organization that promoted Nichiren Buddhism. Running as independents, three members of the Sōka Gakkai had been elected to the House of Councillors in the 1956 elections, with the 1959 elections seeing nine members elected. It also had several members elected to local assemblies. In 1957, a group of Young Men's Division members campaigning for a Gakkai candidate in an Osaka House of Councillors by-election were arrested for distributing money, cigarettes, and caramels at supporters' residences, in violation of elections law, and on July 3 of that year, at the beginning of an event memorialized as the "Osaka Incident", Daisaku Ikeda was arrested in Osaka. He was taken into custody in his capacity as Sōka Gakkai's Youth Division Chief of Staff for overseeing activities that constituted violations of elections law. He spent two weeks in jail and appeared in court forty-eight times before he was cleared of all charges in January 1962.

Amongst its policies, the new party supported the 1947 constitution and opposed nuclear weapons. Headed by Harashima Kōji. In the July 1962 elections the new party won nine seats in the House of Councillors. On 17 November 1964 the party was renamed Kōmeitō. In 1968, fourteen of its members were convicted of forging absentee ballots in Shinjuku, and eight were sentenced to prison for electoral fraud. In the 1960s it was widely criticized for violating the separation of church and state, and in February 1970 all three major Japanese newspapers printed editorials demanding that the party reorganize. It eventually broke apart based on promises to segregate from Soka Gakkai.

In 1969, the Kōmeitō became the third political party in Japan. In the 1980s discovered that many Soka Gakkai members were rewarding acquaintances with presents in return for Komeito votes, and that Okinawa residents had changed their addresses to elect Komeito politicians. It was also revealed that while the party was technically separate from the Soka Gakkai, monetary donations made that were tax exempt were being funneled into funding for the Kōmeitō party as revealed by an expelled Kōmeitō member of the Tokyo municipal assembly. It was usually supportive of the Japan Socialist Party, and opposed the LDP (Liberal Democratic Party), the major ruling party at that time. Ideologically, Kōmeitō proposed a mild form of what it called "humanitarian socialism", which its one-time secretary general Hiroshi Hojo defined as "a Buddhist version of Christian Democratic socialism".

Kōmeitō did quite well, and in 1993, when the LDP was for the first time declared an opposition party, the Kōmeitō became one of the ruling parties, headed by the liberal Japan New Party, but which also included the Democratic Socialist Party, Japan Renewal Party, the New Party Sakigake, and the Japan Socialist Party. In 1994, the latter two parties left the coalition, and in July they took over the rule, making another coalition with the LDP. The Kōmeitō was again thrown into opposition. On December 5, 1994, The Kōmeitō split into two parties. The Lower House chairs and some of Upper House chairs formed Kōmeitō New Party, and five days later joined into the New Frontier Party. The others, i.e. local assembly members and the rest of the Upper House chairs, formed Kōmei and independent friend of the New Frontier Party. In 1998, the New Frontier Party dissolved, and former Kōmeitō members formed New Peace Party and Reform Club. They merged with Kōmei in the same year and then became known as the NKP (New Kōmeitō Party). The NKP adopted a more conservative agenda than the former Kōmeitō and in 1999 they supported the ruling party, the LDP.

== Leaders ==
| No. | Name (Birth–death) | Constituency / title | Term of office | | Prime Minister (term) | Status |
| No. | Name (Birth–death) | Constituency / title | Took office | Left office | Prime Minister (term) | Status |
|---|---|---|---|---|---|---|
| 1 | Kōji Harashima (1909–1964) | Cllr for national district | 17 November 1964 | 9 December 1964 | Satō (1964–72) | Opposition |
| 2 | Takehisa Tsuji (1918–2012) | Cllr for national district | 9 December 1964 | 13 February 1967 | Satō (1964–72) | Opposition |
| 3 | Yoshikatsu Takeiri (1926–2023) | Rep for Tokyo 10th | 13 February 1967 | 5 December 1986 | Satō (1964–72) | Opposition |
| 3 | Yoshikatsu Takeiri (1926–2023) | Rep for Tokyo 10th | 13 February 1967 | 5 December 1986 | Tanaka K. (1972–74) | Opposition |
| 3 | Yoshikatsu Takeiri (1926–2023) | Rep for Tokyo 10th | 13 February 1967 | 5 December 1986 | Miki (1974–76) | Opposition |
| 3 | Yoshikatsu Takeiri (1926–2023) | Rep for Tokyo 10th | 13 February 1967 | 5 December 1986 | Fukuda T. (1976–78) | Opposition |
| 3 | Yoshikatsu Takeiri (1926–2023) | Rep for Tokyo 10th | 13 February 1967 | 5 December 1986 | Ōhira (1978–80) | Opposition |
| 3 | Yoshikatsu Takeiri (1926–2023) | Rep for Tokyo 10th | 13 February 1967 | 5 December 1986 | Ito M. (1980) (acting) | Opposition |
| 3 | Yoshikatsu Takeiri (1926–2023) | Rep for Tokyo 10th | 13 February 1967 | 5 December 1986 | Suzuki Z. (1980–82) | Opposition |
| 3 | Yoshikatsu Takeiri (1926–2023) | Rep for Tokyo 10th | 13 February 1967 | 5 December 1986 | Nakasone (1982–87) | Opposition |
| 4 | Junya Yano (b. 1932) | Rep for Ōsaka 4th | 5 December 1986 | 21 May 1989 | Nakasone (1982–87) | Opposition |
| 4 | Junya Yano (b. 1932) | Rep for Ōsaka 4th | 5 December 1986 | 21 May 1989 | Takeshita (1987–89) | Opposition |
| 5 | Kōshirō Ishida (1930–2006) | Rep for Aichi 6th | 21 May 1989 | 5 December 1994 | Takeshita (1987–89) | Opposition |
| 5 | Kōshirō Ishida (1930–2006) | Rep for Aichi 6th | 21 May 1989 | 5 December 1994 | Uno (1989) | Opposition |
| 5 | Kōshirō Ishida (1930–2006) | Rep for Aichi 6th | 21 May 1989 | 5 December 1994 | Kaifu (1989–91) | Opposition |
| 5 | Kōshirō Ishida (1930–2006) | Rep for Aichi 6th | 21 May 1989 | 5 December 1994 | Miyazawa (1991–93) | Opposition |
| 5 | Kōshirō Ishida (1930–2006) | Rep for Aichi 6th | 21 May 1989 | 5 December 1994 | Hosokawa (1993–94) | Governing coalition |
| 5 | Kōshirō Ishida (1930–2006) | Rep for Aichi 6th | 21 May 1989 | 5 December 1994 | Hata (1994) | Governing coalition |
| 5 | Kōshirō Ishida (1930–2006) | Rep for Aichi 6th | 21 May 1989 | 5 December 1994 | Murayama (1994–96) | Opposition |

== Election results ==
=== House of Representatives ===
House of Representatives
| Election | Leader | No. of candidates | Seats | | | Position | Constituency votes | | PR Block votes | | Status |
| Election | Leader | No. of candidates | No. | ± | Share | Position | No. | Share | No. | Share | Status |
|---|---|---|---|---|---|---|---|---|---|---|---|
| 1967 | Takehisa Tsuji | 32 | 25 / 486 | | 5.1% | 4th | 2,472,371 | 5.4% | | | Opposition |
| 1969 | Yoshikatsu Takeiri | 76 | 47 / 486 | ▲22 | 9.6% | ▲3rd | 5,124,666 | 10.9% | | | Opposition |
| 1972 | Yoshikatsu Takeiri | 59 | 29 / 491 | ▼18 | 5.9% | ▼4th | 4,436,755 | 8.5% | | | Opposition |
| 1976 | Yoshikatsu Takeiri | 84 | 55 / 511 | ▲26 | 10.7% | ▲3rd | 6,177,300 | 10.9% | | | Opposition |
| 1979 | Yoshikatsu Takeiri | 64 | 57 / 511 | ▲2 | 11.1% | 3rd | 5,282,682 | 9.78% | | | Opposition |
| 1980 | Yoshikatsu Takeiri | 64 | 33 / 511 | ▼24 | 6.4% | 3rd | 5,329,942 | 9.03% | | | Opposition |
| 1983 | Yoshikatsu Takeiri | 59 | 58 / 511 | ▲25 | 11.3% | 3rd | 5,745,751 | 10.12% | | | Opposition |
| 1986 | Yoshikatsu Takeiri | 61 | 56 / 512 | ▼2 | 10.9% | 3rd | 5,701,277 | 9.43% | | | Opposition |
| 1990 | Kōshirō Ishida | 58 | 45 / 512 | ▼11 | 8.7% | 3rd | 5,242,675 | 7.98% | | | Opposition |
| 1993 | Kōshirō Ishida | 54 | 51 / 511 | ▲6 | 9.9% | ▼4th | 5,114,351 | 8.14% | | | Governing coalition (until 1994) |

=== House of Councillors ===
House of Councillors
| Election | Leader | Seats | | Nationwide (Note: From 1947 to 1980, 50 members were elected through a nationwide constituency, known as the "national block" (Plurality-at-large voting). It was replaced in 1983 by a proportional representation block with closed lists. In 2001, the PR block was reduced to 48 members with most open lists.) | | Prefecture | | Status |
| Election | Leader | Total (Note: The Upper house is split in two classes, one elected every three years.) | Contested | Number | % | Number | % | Status |
|---|---|---|---|---|---|---|---|---|
| 1965 | Yoshikatsu Takeiri | 20 / 251 | 11 / 125 | 5,097,682 | 13.7% | 1,910,975 | 5.1% | Minority |
| 1968 | Yoshikatsu Takeiri | 24 / 250 | 7 / 125 | 6,656, 771 | 15.5% | 2,632,528 | 6.1% | Minority |
| 1971 | Yoshikatsu Takeiri | 22 / 249 | 10 / 125 | 5,626,293 | 14.1% | 1,391,855 | 3.5% | Minority |
| 1974 | Yoshikatsu Takeiri | 24 / 250 | 14 / 125 | 6,360,419 | 12.1% | 6,732,937 | 12.6% | Minority |
| 1977 | Yoshikatsu Takeiri | 25 / 249 | 14 / 125 | 7,174,459 | 14.2% | 3,206,719 | 6.1% | Minority |
| 1980 | Yoshikatsu Takeiri | 26 / 250 | 12 / 125 | 6,669,387 | 11.9% | 2,817,379 | 4.9% | Minority |
| 1983 | Yoshikatsu Takeiri | 27 / 252 | 14 / 126 | 7,314,465 | 15.7% | 3,615,995 | 7.8% | Minority |
| 1986 | Yoshikatsu Takeiri | 24 / 252 | 10 / 126 | 7,438,501 | 12.97% | 2,549,037 | 4.40% | Minority |
| 1989 | Kōshirō Ishida | 21 / 252 | 11 / 126 | 6,097,971 | 10.86% | 2,900,947 | 5.10% | Minority |
| 1992 | Kōshirō Ishida | 24 / 252 | 14 / 126 | 6,415,503 | 14.27% | 3,550,060 | 7.82% | Minority (until 1993) |
| 1992 | Kōshirō Ishida | 24 / 252 | 14 / 126 | 6,415,503 | 14.27% | 3,550,060 | 7.82% | Governing minority (1993–1994) |
| 1992 | Kōshirō Ishida | 24 / 252 | 14 / 126 | 6,415,503 | 14.27% | 3,550,060 | 7.82% | Minority (1994) |

== See also ==
- Japan Socialist Party
- Liberal Democratic Party (Japan)
- Komeito
- Politics of Japan
- Reformist party (Japan) (Before 1990s)
- Social Democratic Party (Japan)
- Sōka Gakkai
