= 1974 Japanese House of Councillors election =

- 7 July 1974

130 of the 252 seats in the House of Councillors 127 seats needed for a majority
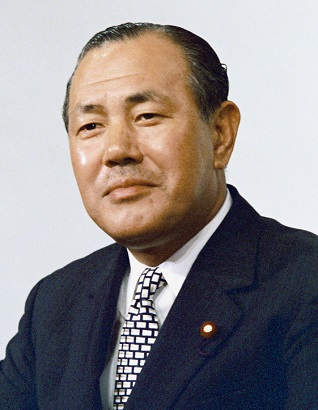

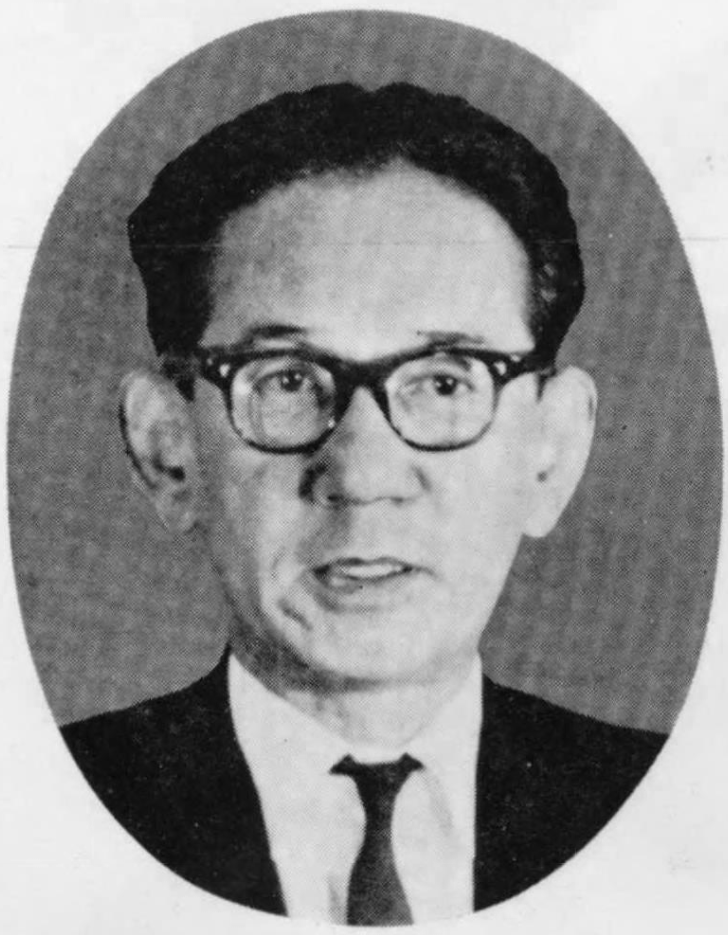

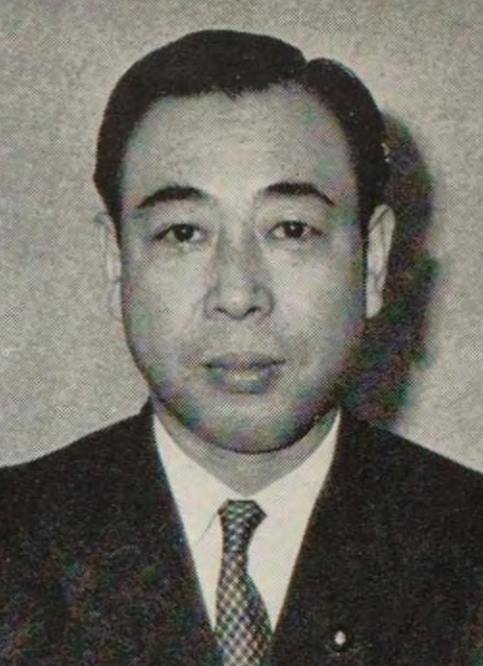

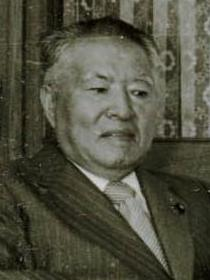

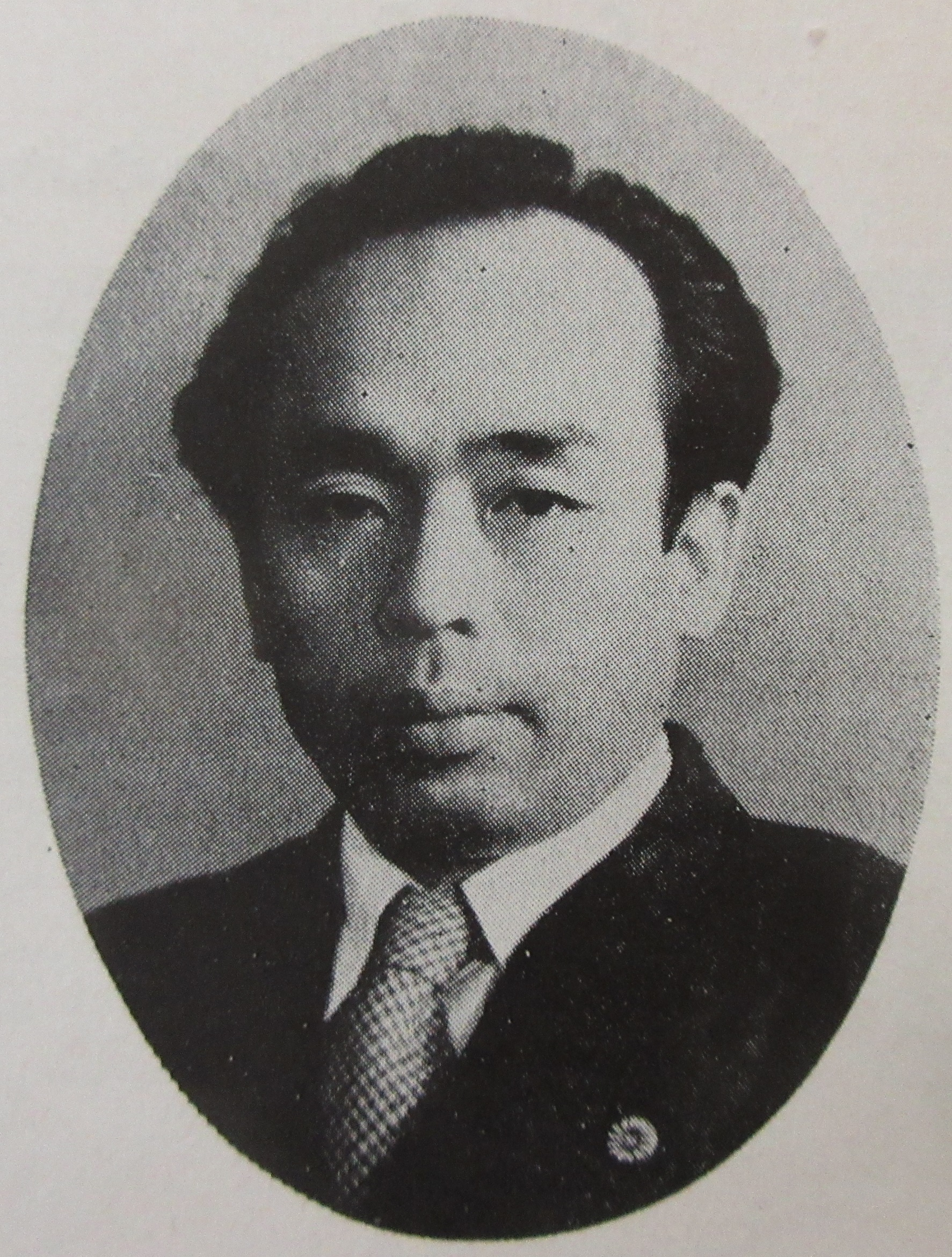
	First party	Second party	Third party
Leader	Kakuei Tanaka	Tomomi Narita	Yoshikatsu Takeiri
Party	LDP	Socialist	Kōmeitō
Seats after	126	62	24
Seat change	▼11	▼4	▲2
Popular vote	23,332,773	7,990,457	6,360,419
Percentage	44.3%	15.2%	12.1%
Swing	▼0.2pp	▼6.1pp	▼2.0pp
	Fourth party	Fifth party
Leader	Kenji Miyamoto	Kasuga Ikkō
Party	JCP	Democratic Socialist
Seats after	20	10
Seat change	▲10	▼3
Popular vote	4,931,650	3,114,895
Percentage	9.4%	5.9%
Swing	▲1.3pp	▼0.2pp
- Results of the election, showing the winning candidates in each prefecture and the national block.
President of the House of Councillors before election
Yasoichi Mori
LDP
President of the House of Councillors-designate
Kazuo Maeda
LDP

House of Councillors elections were held in Japan on 7 July 1974, electing just over half of the members in the upper house of Japan's legislature, the National Diet. The Liberal Democratic Party won the most seats, but it was left with fewer councillors overall and lost the outright majority that it had held in the house prior to the elections.

The election was marked by polar opposite predictions by political commentators, some claiming that the LDP would see disastrous results following severe price inflation and the 1973 oil crisis; although as the election approached, others confidently believed the LDP would see marked success following shifts in forecasts. The results ended up somewhere in between, as the LDP membership of the house was reduced to 126, exactly half of the 252 seats. The LDP barely held onto a thin majority, by enlisting the help of two LDP-aligned independents.

The biggest winner among the opposition was the Japanese Communist Party, the only major party to see an increase in the popular vote. Its number of seats was doubled (albeit from a low base), thanks to skillful allocation of votes for specific candidates, with many JCP candidates spread equitably among the lower ranks of the national district results, instead of wasting many votes on a few candidates and thereby causing a few others to fell below the threshold. LDP factional infighting and the subsequent vote splitting ended up hurting the LDP severely, such as in the four-member Hokkaido district. Here, only two LDP candidates were fielded, but a conservative independent running against them caused the conservative vote to be split and all three failed to be elected, giving all of the seats to the opposition.

The election also weakened Prime Minister Kakuei Tanaka's standing within his own party. This was most evident when Kentarō Kujime, who belonged to the same faction as anti-Tanaka LDP politician and future Prime Minister Takeo Miki, ran as an independent candidate against the LDP-approved candidate Masaharu Gotōda in the Tokushima district and won (an event dubbed the "Awa War," after the birthplace of Miki). Along with Tokushima, the LDP also lost to the opposition in the single-seat district for Okinawa, but won in all of the other ones, instead seeing their losses in the urban districts with more seats, a typical situation for older Japanese elections. Despite all of this, Tanaka saw his faction increase in terms of the number of Diet seats it held, whereas both Miki and former Prime Minister Takeo Fukuda, another Tanaka critic, saw their factions decrease in power.

== Results ==
Party	National			Constituency			Seats			
Party	Votes	%	Seats	Votes	%	Seats	Not up	Won	Total after	+/–
Liberal Democratic Party	23,332,773	44.34	19	21,132,372	39.50	43	64	62	126	–8
Japan Socialist Party	7,990,457	15.18	10	13,907,865	26.00	18	34	28	62	–4
Komeitō	6,360,419	12.09	9	6,732,937	12.59	5	10	14	24	+1
Japanese Communist Party	4,931,650	9.37	8	6,428,919	12.02	5	7	13	20	+10
Democratic Socialist Party	3,114,895	5.92	4	2,353,397	4.40	1	5	5	10	–3
Other parties	74,346	0.14	0	332,716	0.62	1	0	1	1	–
Independents	6,820,199	12.96	4	2,609,195	4.88	3	2	7	9	+4
Total	52,624,739	100.00	54	53,497,401	100.00	76	122	130	252	+1
Valid votes	52,624,739	95.41		53,497,401	96.98					
Invalid/blank votes	2,532,796	4.59		1,666,499	3.02					
Total votes	55,157,535	100.00		55,163,900	100.00					
Registered voters/turnout	75,356,068	73.20		75,356,068	73.20					
Source: Ministry of Internal Affairs and Communications, National Diet

=== By constituency ===
Constituency	Total seats	Seats won					
Constituency	Total seats	LDP	JSP	Kōmeitō	JCP	DSP	Ind.
Aichi	3	1	1			1	
Akita	1	1					
Aomori	1	1					
Chiba	2	1	1				
Ehime	1	1					
Fukui	1	1					
Fukuoka	3	1	1	1			
Fukushima	2	1	1				
Gifu	1	1					
Gunma	2	1	1				
Hiroshima	2	1	1				
Hokkaido	4		2	1	1		
Hyōgo	3	1		1	1		
Ibaraki	2	1	1				
Ishikawa	1	1					
Iwate	1	1					
Kagawa	1	1					
Kagoshima	2	1	1				
Kanagawa	2	1	1				
Kōchi	1	1					
Kumamoto	2	2					
Kyoto	2	1			1		
Mie	1	1					
Miyagi	1	1					
Miyazaki	1	1					
Nagano	2	1	1				
Nagasaki	1	1					
Nara	1	1					
Niigata	2	1	1				
Ōita	1	1					
Okinawa	1						1
Okayama	2	1	1				
Osaka	3	1		1	1		
Saga	1	1					
Saitama	2	1	1				
Shiga	1	1					
Shimane	1	1					
Shizuoka	2	1	1				
Tochigi	2		1				1
Tokushima	1						1
Tokyo	4	1	1	1	1		
Tottori	1	1					
Toyama	1	1					
Wakayama	1	1					
Yamagata	1	1					
Yamaguchi	1	1					
Yamanashi	1	1					
National	54	19	10	9	8	4	4
Total	130	63	28	14	13	5	7
