= 1977 Japanese House of Councillors election =

- 10 July 1977

126 of the 252 seats in the House of Councillors 127 seats needed for a majority
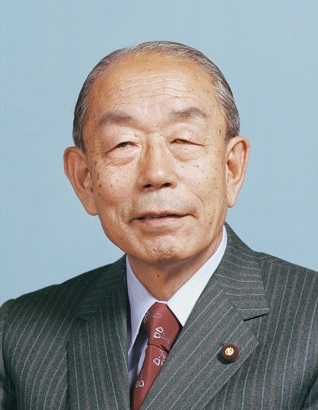

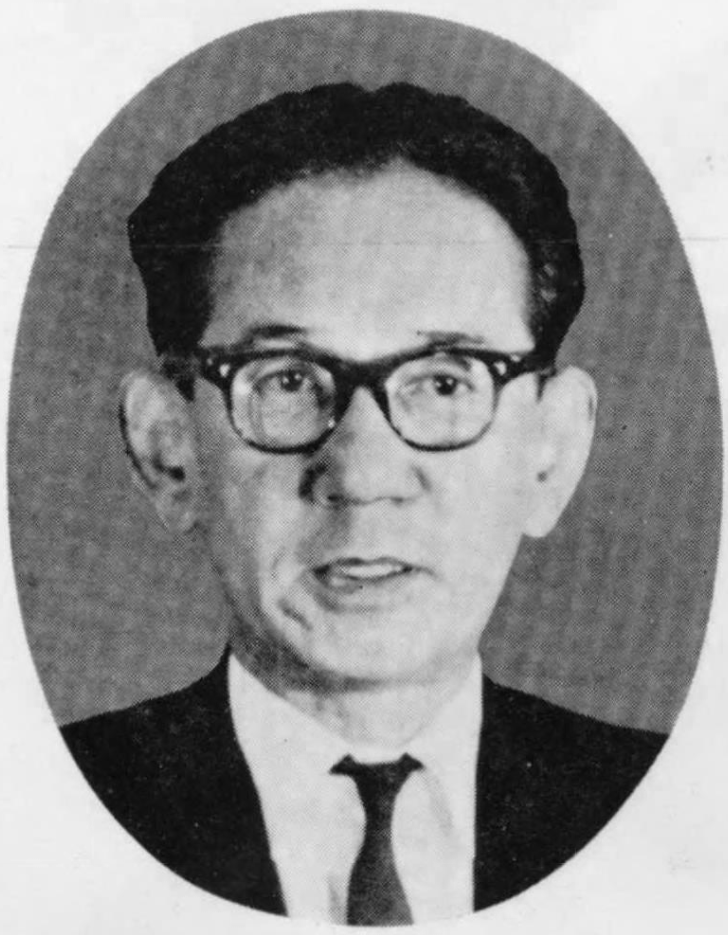

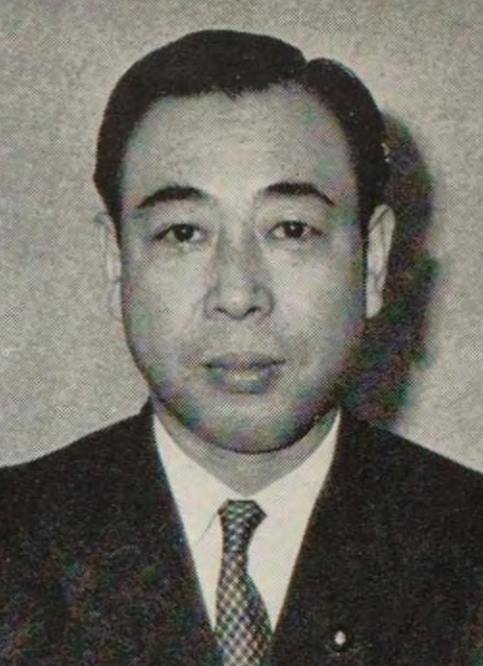

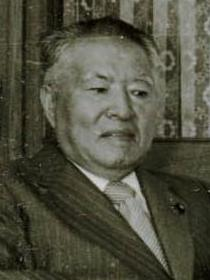

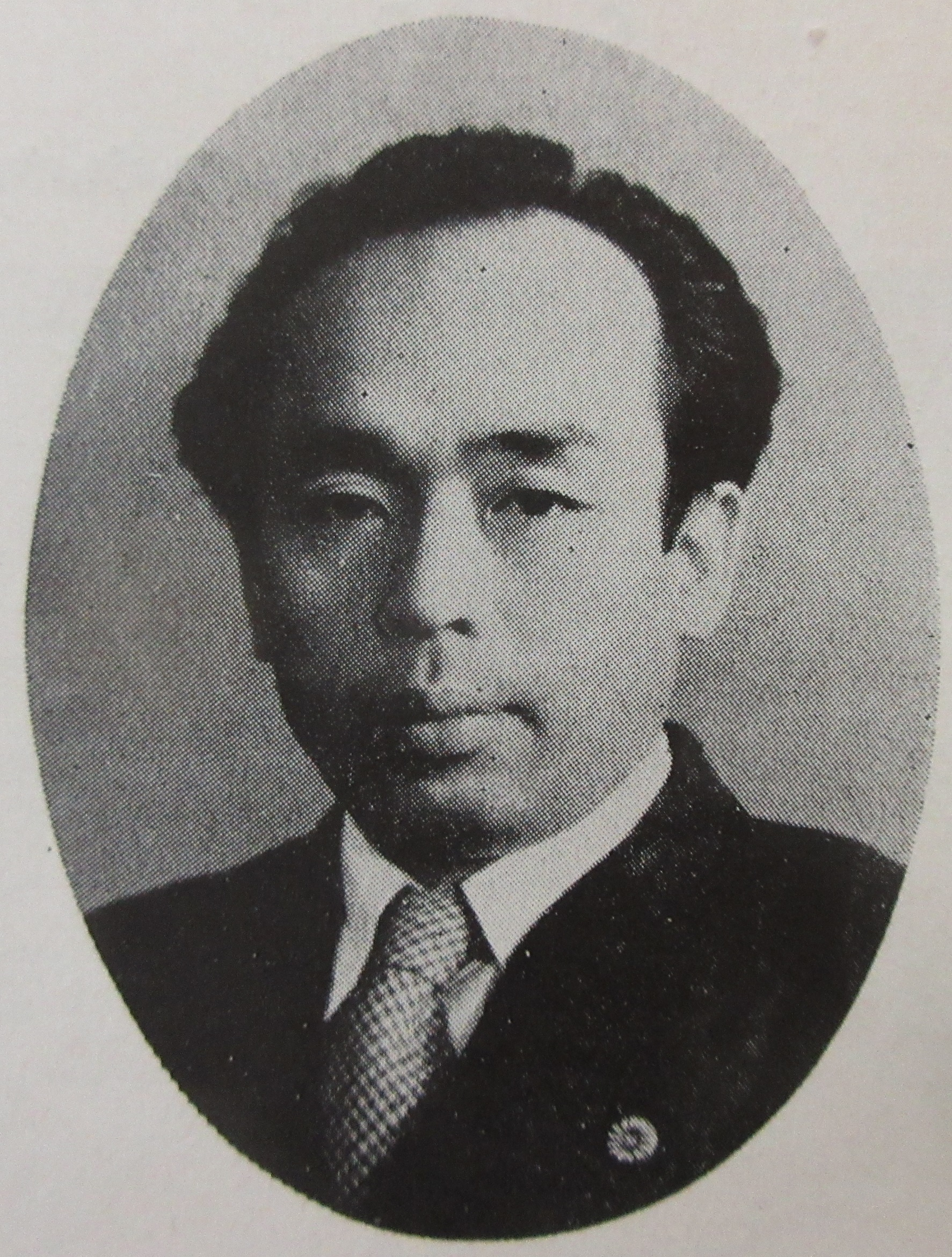

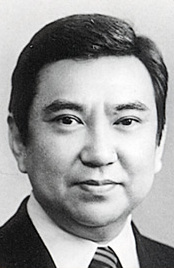
	First party	Second party	Third party
Leader	Takeo Fukuda	Tomomi Narita	Yoshikatsu Takeiri
Party	LDP	Socialist	Kōmeitō
Last election	126 seats, 44.3%	62 seats, 15.2%	24 seats, 12.1%
Seats after	124	56	28
Seat change	▼2	▼6	▲4
Popular vote	18,160,061	8,805,617	7,174,459
Percentage	35.8%	17.3%	14.2%
Swing	▼8.5%	▲2.1%	▲2.1%
	Fourth party	Fifth party	Sixth party
Leader	Kenji Miyamoto	Kasuga Ikkō	Yōhei Kōno
Party	JCP	Democratic Socialist	New Liberal Club
Last election	20 seats, 9.4%	10 seats, 5.9%	–
Seats after	16	11	3
Seat change	▼4	▲1	New
Popular vote	4,260,050	3,387,541	1,957,902
Percentage	8.4%	6.7%	3.9%
Swing	▼1.0%	▲0.8%	New
- Results of the election, showing the winning candidates in each prefecture and the national block.
President of the House
of Councillors before election
Kazuo Maeda
LDP
Elected President of the House
of Councillors
Kan Kase
Socialist

House of Councillors elections were held in Japan on 10 July 1977. Only half of the House of Councillors was up for election.

The main question of this election was whether or not the Liberal Democratic Party (LDP) would be able to retain its hold on an absolute majority of the seats in the House of Councillors, something it has maintained since the party's founding in 1955. Early forecasts had speculated that this dramatic downturn for the LDP may have been possible, but in the end the LDP kept its razor-thin hold on majority control by having four LDP-allied independents cooperate with it. As per usual for the time, the LDP did very well in the sparsely populated single member districts and even managed to hold its own not only in the two-member districts, but even in the more heavily urbanised three- and four-member districts which were projected to be tough wins for the LDP.

The LDP's clearest struggling was in the national district, where its popular vote declined by 8.5% when compared to the previous House of Councillors election. In any event, the pessimistic forecasts of the election results ended up influencing the LDP's approach in fielding relatively few candidates, and members of the party believed that if they disregarded the polls and fielded more candidates, they could have won a larger share of the seats in this election. Meanwhile, the Japan Socialist Party also saw a loss in seats (partly due to vote splitting caused by former member Saburō Eda's SCL splinter party siphoning away votes from the JSP.) The Japanese Communist Party also saw a decline in fortunes, with Kōmeitō and the Democratic Socialist Party showing the most promise among well-established opposition parties.

== Results ==
Party	National			Constituency			Seats			
Party	Votes	%	Seats	Votes	%	Seats	Not up	Won	Total after	+/–
Liberal Democratic Party	18,160,061	35.83	18	20,440,157	39.46	45	61	63	124	–2
Japan Socialist Party	8,805,617	17.37	10	13,403,216	25.88	17	29	27	56	–6
Komeitō	7,174,459	14.16	9	3,206,719	6.19	5	14	14	28	+4
Japanese Communist Party	4,260,050	8.41	3	5,159,142	9.96	2	11	5	16	–4
Democratic Socialist Party	3,387,541	6.68	4	2,318,386	4.48	2	5	6	11	+1
New Liberal Club	1,957,902	3.86	1	2,951,976	5.70	2	1	3	4	New
League for Civil Society	1,418,855	2.80	1	610,505	1.18	0	0	1	1	New
United Progressive Liberals	1,381,700	2.73	1	475,560	0.92	0	0	1	1	New
Women's Party of Japan	161,692	0.32	0	45,328	0.09	0	0	0	0	New
Other parties	207,056	0.41	0	702,900	1.36	1	0	1	1	–
Independents	3,767,662	7.43	3	2,485,292	4.80	2	4	5	9	0
Vacant						1	0	1	1	–
Total	50,682,595	100.00	50	51,799,181	100.00	77	125	127	252	0
Valid votes	50,682,595	94.50		51,799,181	96.56					
Invalid/blank votes	2,952,193	5.50		1,843,415	3.44					
Total votes	53,634,788	100.00		53,642,596	100.00					
Registered voters/turnout	78,321,715	68.48		78,321,715	68.49					
Source: Ministry of Internal Affairs and Communications, National Diet

=== By constituency ===
Constituency	Total seats	Seats won									
Constituency	Total seats	LDP	JSP	Kōmeitō	DSP	JCP	NLC	LCS	UPL	Others	Ind.
Aichi	3	1		1	1						
Akita	1	1									
Aomori	1	1									
Chiba	2	1	1								
Ehime	1	1									
Fukui	1	1									
Fukuoka	3	1	1	1							
Fukushima	2	1	1								
Gifu	1	1									
Gunma	2	1	1								
Hiroshima	2	1	1								
Hokkaido	4	2	2								
Hyōgo	3	1	1	1							
Ibaraki	2	1	1								
Ishikawa	1	1									
Iwate	1	1									
Kagawa	1	1									
Kagoshima	2	1									1
Kanagawa	2		1								1
Kōchi	1	1									
Kumamoto	2	2									
Kyoto	2	1				1					
Mie	1		1								
Miyagi	1	1									
Miyazaki	1	1									
Nagano	2	1	1								
Nagasaki	1	1									
Nara	1	1									
Niigata	2	1	1								
Ōita	1									1	
Okinawa	1	1									
Okayama	2	1	1								
Osaka	3	1		1		1					
Saga	1	1									
Saitama	2	1					1				
Shiga	1	1									
Shimane	1	1									
Shizuoka	2	1	1								
Tochigi	2	1	1								
Tokushima	1	1									
Tokyo	4	1		1	1		1				
Tottori	1		1								
Toyama	1	1									
Wakayama	1	1									
Yamagata	1	1									
Yamaguchi	1	1									
Yamanashi	1	1									
National	50	18	10	9	4	3	1	1	1		3
Total	126	63	27	14	6	5	3	1	1	1	5
