= Tomio Fujii =

Japanese politician (1924–2021)

- 藤井 富雄
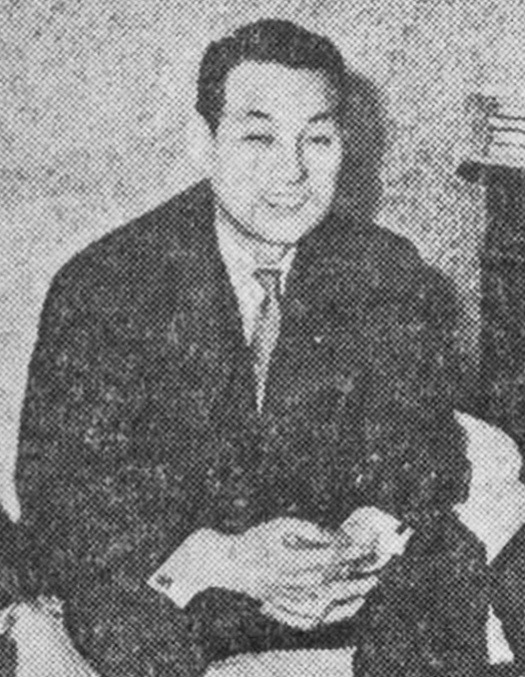
- Fujii in 1966

Leader of Komei Faction
- In office 5 December 1994 – 18 January 1998
- Preceded by: Position established
- Succeeded by: Toshiko Hamayotsu

Member of the Tokyo Metropolitan Assembly
- In office 23 April 1963 – 22 July 2005
- Constituency: Shinjuku Ward

Member of the Nerima Ward Assembly
- In office April 1955 – April 1963

Personal details
- Born: 17 August 1924 Tokyo, Japan
- Died: 11 July 2021 (aged 96)
- Party: Komeito
- Other political affiliations: Independent (1955–1963); CGP (1963–1964); Komei Faction (1994–1998)
- Education: Nihon University

Tomio Fujii (Japanese: 藤井 富雄, Fujii Tomio; 17 August 1924 – 11 July 2021) was a Japanese politician who served as the leader of the Komei splinter party between 1994 and 1998. In addition, he was a founding member of Komeito who served as an 11-term member of the Tokyo Metropolitan Assembly as well as a leading figure in Komeito's Tokyo chapter.

== Biography ==
After graduating from Nihon University's engineering department, he joined Soka Gakkai and, as a close aide of Daisaku Ikeda, he supported the shakubuku movement of confrontational proselytisation. He won his first election as an independent running for the assembly of Tokyo's Nerima ward in April 1955. Among the 32 people elected, he was the only one who had Soka Gakkai's endorsement. In April 1963, he won a seat in the Tokyo Metropolitan Assembly representing the Shinjuku ward, this time as a candidate for the Komei Political League, the predecessor group to Komeito. In 1967, he became Chief Secretary for the Komeito's Tokyo Metropolitan Assembly division.

In July 1989, Fujii helped contribute to the success of the Japan Socialist Party at that year's metropolitan elections, and also was appointed the leader of the Assembly's deliberation group. However, in December 1994, Komeito split into four parties, with Fujii remaining a member of the "Komei" faction (composed mainly of councillors and local assembly leaders), and was also its leader for most of its brief history. Although the "New Komei" faction (composed mainly of representatives) joined the New Frontier Party, the "Komei" faction stuck to its guns in elections despite earlier plans to join forces with the NFP. As early as 1995, Fujii had pondered the possibility of an LDP-Komeito coalition, something which would later come to fruition a year after his tenure as party chairman ended. Ichiro Ozawa had attempted to persuade Fujii not to field its own PR candidates in the upcoming 1998 House of Councillors election, but Fujii did not let up his party's plans to do so, although he stated that he desired continued friendly relations between Komei and the NFP.

In November 1998, Komeito reconsolidated under the name of New Komeito. In 2004, Fujii was appointed Komeito's highest advisor at the party's convention that year. In the 2005 Tokyo prefectural election that was held in July, he turned over his power base to the younger candidate Masami Yoshikura and retired from the political world. However, he continued to actively pursue his role as a top advisor to the party. Although the Komeito had made exceptions to its retirement age precedents for members that had served in important posts, it was still unusual for a Komeito member serving in a legislature to reach the age of 80 as Fujii had done. In September 2006, he resigned from his position as a top advisor, and moved over to working at the Komeito's Tokyo headquarters. In addition, he also became a director at the Komeito Cultural Association.
