= 1959 Japanese House of Councillors election =

- 2 June 1959

127 of the 250 seats in the House of Councillors 126 seats needed for a majority
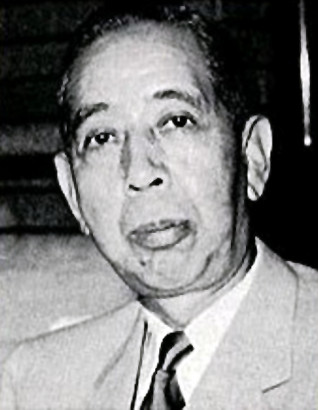

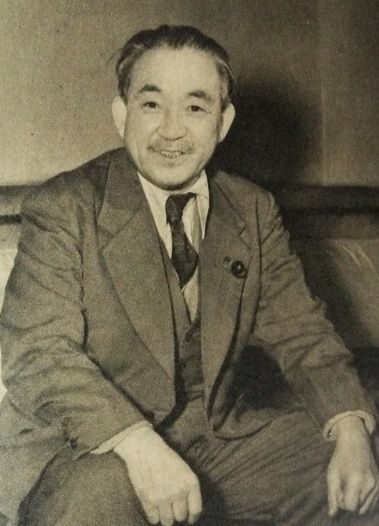

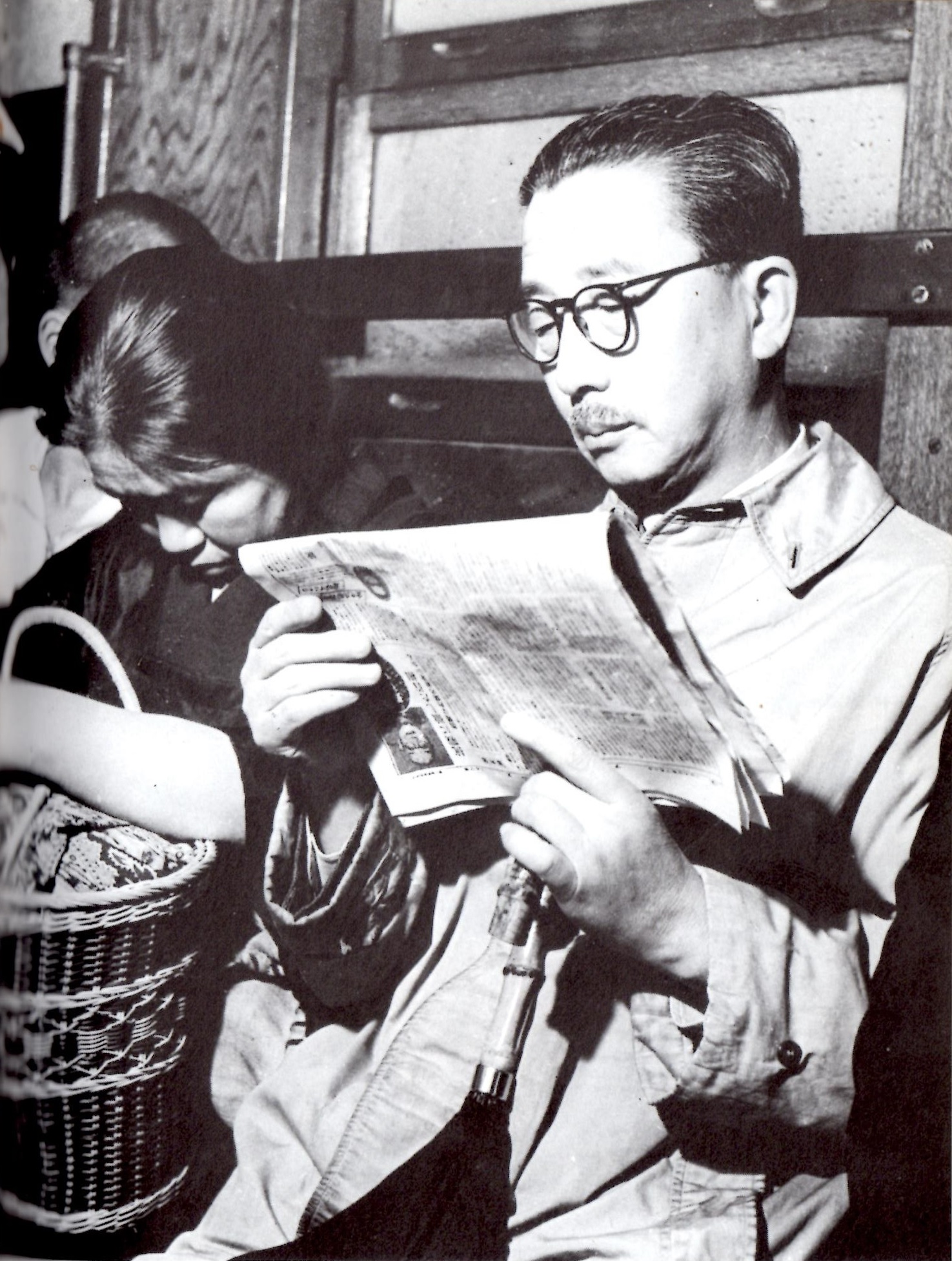
	First party	Second party
Leader	Nobusuke Kishi	Mosaburō Suzuki
Party	LDP	Socialist
Seats after	132	85
Seat change	▲10	▲5
Popular vote	12,120,598	7,794,754
Percentage	41.2%	26.5%
Swing	▲4.5%	▼3.4%
	Third party	Fourth party
Leader		Sanzō Nosaka
Party	Ryokufūkai	JCP
Seats after	11	3
Seat change	▼20	▲1
Popular vote	2,382,703	551,196
Percentage	8.1%	1.9%
Swing	▼2.0%	▼0.2%
- Results of the election, showing the winning candidates in each prefecture and the national block.
President of the House of Councillors before election
Yūzō Shigemune
LDP
President of the House of Councillors-designate
Yutaka Terao
LDP

House of Councillors elections were held in Japan on 2 June 1959, electing half the seats in the House. The Liberal Democratic Party won the most seats. Kōji Harashima, who later become a founding member and the first chairman of Kōmeitō, was elected to the Diet for the first time as one of several Soka Gakkai-affiliated independents.

During the campaign, Prime Minister Nobusuke Kishi and MITI began to discuss the now-famous "income doubling" plan, although it was temporarily shelved due to disputes between party factions and the looming importance of the US–Japan Security Treaty revision issue. The plan would not be revived until the tenure of Hayato Ikeda, beginning in 1960.

== Results ==
Party	National			Constituency			Seats			
Party	Votes	%	Seats	Votes	%	Seats	Not up	Won	Total after	+/–
Liberal Democratic Party	12,120,598	41.20	22	15,667,022	52.00	49	61	71	132	+10
Japan Socialist Party	7,794,754	26.49	17	10,265,394	34.07	21	47	38	85	+5
Ryokufūkai	2,382,703	8.10	4	731,383	2.43	2	5	6	11	–20
Political League for Small and Medium Enterprises	598,519	2.03	1				0	1	1	New
Japanese Communist Party	551,916	1.88	1	999,255	3.32	0	2	1	3	+1
Other parties	154,743	0.53	0	155,189	0.52	0	0	0	0	0
Independents	5,817,187	19.77	7	2,311,112	7.67	3	8	10	18	+4
Total	29,420,420	100.00	52	30,129,355	100.00	75	123	127	250	0
Valid votes	29,420,420	93.59		30,129,355	95.83					
Invalid/blank votes	2,016,244	6.41		1,310,398	4.17					
Total votes	31,436,664	100.00		31,439,753	100.00					
Registered voters/turnout	53,516,473	58.74		53,516,473	58.75					
Source: Ministry of Internal Affairs and Communications, National Diet

=== By constituency ===
Prefecture	Total seats	Seats won					
Prefecture	Total seats	LDP	JSP	Ryokufūkai	JCP	PLSME	Ind.
Aichi	3	2	1				
Akita	1	1					
Aomori	1			1			
Chiba	2	1	1				
Ehime	1	1					
Fukui	1	1					
Fukuoka	3	2	1				
Fukushima	2	1	1				
Gifu	1	1					
Gunma	2	1	1				
Hiroshima	2	1	1				
Hokkaido	4	2	2				
Hyōgo	3	2	1				
Ibaraki	2	1	1				
Ishikawa	1						1
Iwate	1	1					
Kagawa	1	1					
Kagoshima	2	2					
Kanagawa	2	1	1				
Kōchi	1	1					
Kumamoto	2	2					
Kyoto	2	1	1				
Mie	1	1					
Miyagi	1	1					
Miyazaki	1	1					
Nagano	2	1	1				
Nagasaki	1	1					
Nara	1	1					
Niigata	2	1	1				
Ōita	1	1					
Okayama	2	1	1				
Osaka	3	1	2				
Saga	1	1					
Saitama	2	1	1				
Shiga	1			1			
Shimane	1	1					
Shizuoka	2	2					
Tochigi	2	1	1				
Tokushima	1	1					
Tokyo	4	2					2
Tottori	1		1				
Toyama	1	1					
Wakayama	1	1					
Yamagata	1	1					
Yamaguchi	1	1					
Yamanashi	1		1				
National	52	22	17	4	1	1	7
Total	127	71	38	6	7	7	10
