= 1965 Japanese House of Councillors election =

- 4 July 1965

127 of the 251 seats in the House of Councillors 126 seats needed for a majority
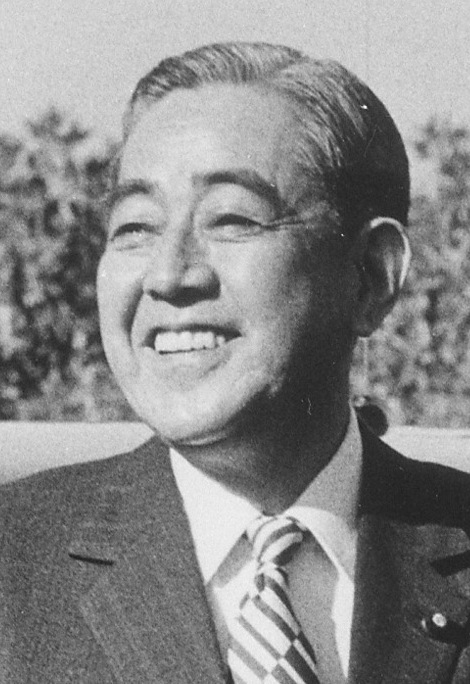

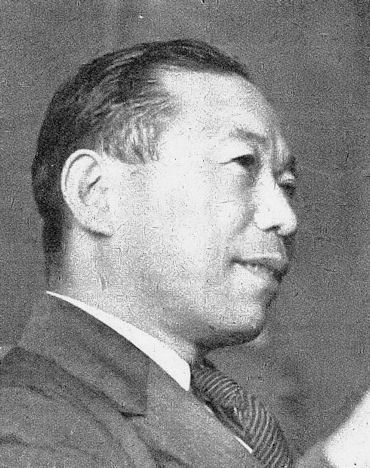

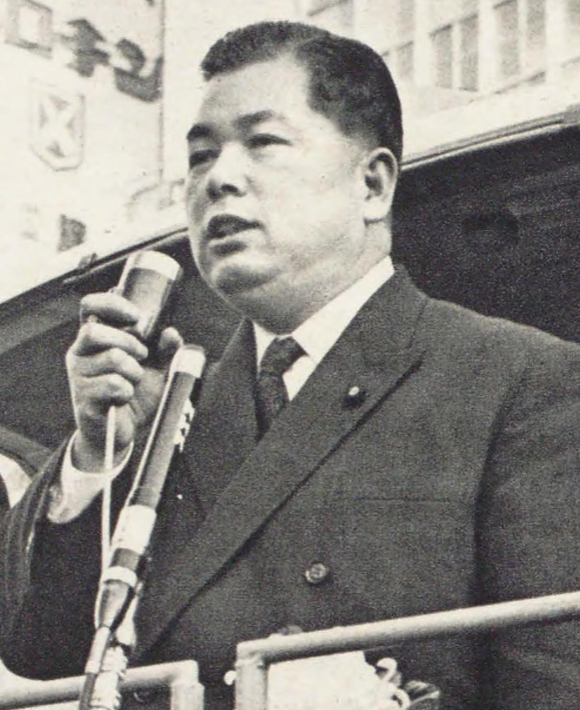

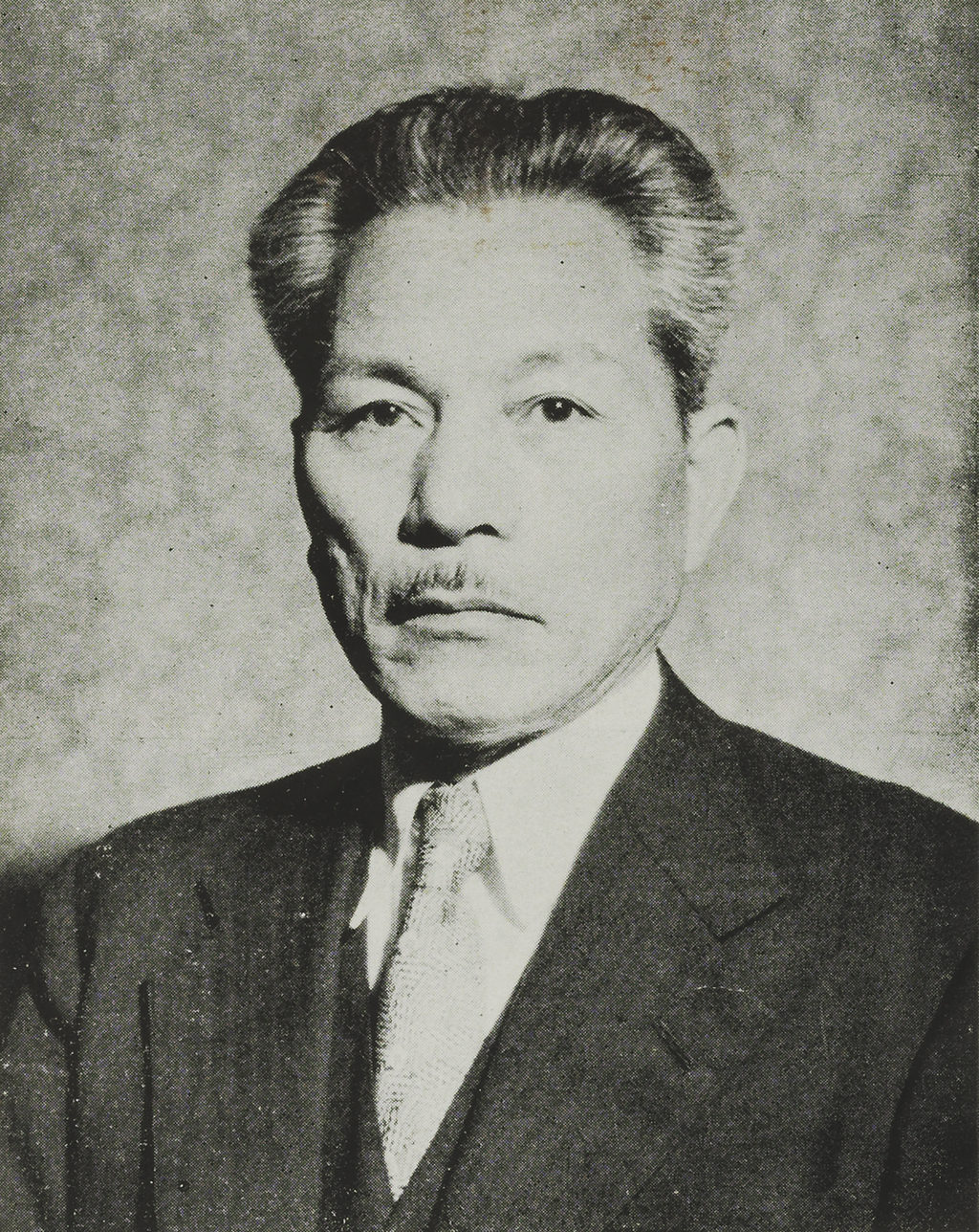
	First party	Second party	Third party
Leader	Eisaku Satō	Kōzō Sasaki	Takehisa Tsuji
Party	LDP	Socialist	Kōmeitō
Seats after	140	73	20
Seat change	▼2	▲6	▲5
Popular vote	17,583,490	8,729,655	5,097,682
Percentage	47.2%	23.4%	13.7%
Swing	▲0.8%	▼0.8%	▲2.2%
	Fourth party	Fifth party
Leader	Suehiro Nishio	Kenji Miyamoto
Party	Democratic Socialist	JCP
Seats after	7	4
Seat change	▼4	Steady
Popular vote	2,214,375	1,652,364
Percentage	5.9%	4.4%
Swing	▲0.6%	▲1.3%
- Results of the election, showing the winning candidates in each prefecture and the national block.
President of the House of Councillors before election
Yōtoku Shigemasa
LDP
President of the House of Councillors-designate
Kenzō Kōno
LDP

House of Councillors elections were held in Japan on 4 July 1965, electing half the seats in the House. The Liberal Democratic Party won the most seats.

== Results ==
Party	National			Constituency			Seats			
Party	Votes	%	Seats	Votes	%	Seats	Not up	Won	Total after	+/–
Liberal Democratic Party	17,583,490	47.17	25	16,651,284	44.20	46	69	71	140	–2
Japan Socialist Party	8,729,655	23.42	12	12,346,650	32.77	24	37	36	73	+7
Kōmeitō	5,097,682	13.68	9	1,910,975	5.07	2	9	11	20	+5
Democratic Socialist Party	2,214,375	5.94	2	2,303,860	6.12	1	4	3	7	–4
Japanese Communist Party	1,652,364	4.43	2	2,608,771	6.92	1	1	3	4	0
Other parties	298,401	0.80	0	185,991	0.49	0	0	0	0	0
Independents	1,700,849	4.56	2	1,664,639	4.42	1	4	3	7	+2
Total	37,276,816	100.00	52	37,672,170	100.00	75	124	127	251	+1
Valid votes	37,276,816	93.42		37,672,170	94.41					
Invalid/blank votes	2,624,119	6.58		2,232,535	5.59					
Total votes	39,900,935	100.00		39,904,705	100.00					
Registered voters/turnout	59,544,407	67.01		59,544,407	67.02					
Source: Ministry of Internal Affairs and Communications, National Diet

=== By constituency ===
Constituency	Total seats	Seats won					
Constituency	Total seats	LDP	JSP	Kōmeitō	DSP	JCP	Ind.
Aichi	3	2	1				
Akita	1	1					
Aomori	1	1					
Chiba	2	1	1				
Ehime	1	1					
Fukui	1	1					
Fukuoka	3	2	1				
Fukushima	2	1	1				
Gifu	1		1				
Gunma	2	1	1				
Hiroshima	2	1	1				
Hokkaido	4	2	2				
Hyōgo	3	1	1		1		
Ibaraki	2	1	1				
Ishikawa	1	1					
Iwate	1	1					
Kagawa	1		1				
Kagoshima	2	2					
Kanagawa	2	1	1				
Kōchi	1	1					
Kumamoto	2	1	1				
Kyoto	2	1	1				
Mie	1	1					
Miyagi	1		1				
Miyazaki	1	1					
Nagano	2	1	1				
Nagasaki	1	1					
Nara	1	1					
Niigata	2	1	1				
Ōita	1	1					
Okayama	2	1	1				
Osaka	3	1	1	1			
Saga	1	1					
Saitama	2	1	1				
Shiga	1	1					
Shimane	1		1				
Shizuoka	2	1	1				
Tochigi	2	2					
Tokushima	1	1					
Tokyo	4		1	1		1	1
Tottori	1	1					
Toyama	1	1					
Wakayama	1	1					
Yamagata	1	1					
Yamaguchi	1	1					
Yamanashi	1	1					
National	52	25	12	9	2	2	2
Total	127	71	36	11	3	3	3
