= Yoshikatsu Takeiri =

Japanese politician (1926–2023)

- 竹入 義勝
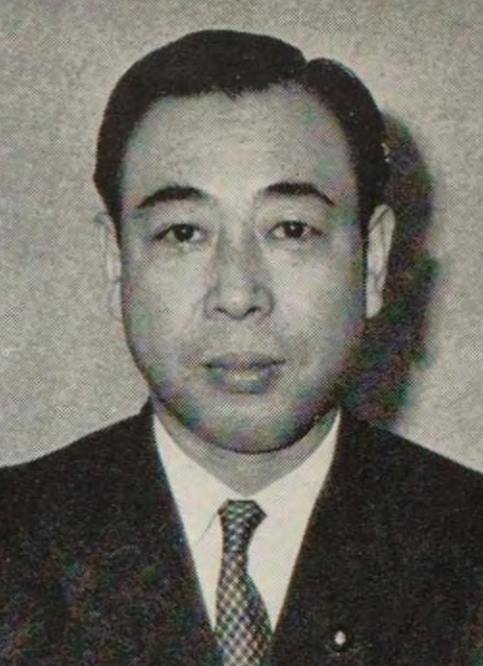
- Takeiri in 1967

Chairman of Komeito
- In office 1 February 1967 – 5 December 1986
- Preceded by: Takehisa Tsuji
- Succeeded by: Junya Yano

Member of the House of Representatives
- In office 29 January 1967 – 24 January 1990
- Preceded by: Constituency established
- Succeeded by: Natsuo Yamaguchi
- Constituency: Tokyo 10th

Member of the Tokyo Metropolitan Assembly
- In office April 1963 – 1964
- Constituency: Kita Ward

Member of the Bunkyō Ward Assembly
- In office April 1959 – April 1963

Personal details
- Born: 10 January 1926 Tatsuno, Nagano, Japan
- Died: 23 December 2023 (aged 97) Fukuoka, Japan
- Party: Komeito (until 1998)

Yoshikatsu Takeiri (Japanese: 竹入義勝, Takeiri Yoshikatsu; 10 January 1926 – 23 December 2023) was a Japanese politician who served as the third chair of Komeito from 1967 to 1986, making him the longest serving leader in the party's history.

== Early life ==
Yoshikatsu Takeiri was born in the town of Tatsuno, Nagano on 10 January 1926 but grew up in the nearby town of Karuizawa, also in Nagano Prefecture. Takeiri joined Soka Gakkai after World War II had ended, having formerly been a worker at Ina Junior High School as well as Japanese National Railways (now JR East).

== Political career ==
Takeiri was first elected to public office as a Soka Gakkai-endorsed independent candidate in April 1959 as a member of the assembly for Tokyo's Bunkyō Ward. In the early 1960s, Takeiri was an active participant in the formation of the Komeito Political Union, the predecessor to what would later formally become the Komeito political party in 1964, the latter of which would appoint Takeiri to be Deputy General Secretary from the start. Around this time, Takeiri befriended future Prime Minister Kakuei Tanaka, who he would assist in various capacities later on.

Takeiri was elected to the House of Representatives for the first time in 1967, serving as a representative for Tokyo's former 10th ward seat. Following the retirement of Takehisa Tsuji, Takeiri took over as Komeito's leader. In a 1967 interview, Soka Gakkai president Daisaku Ikeda claimed to have himself handpicked and trained Takeiri for the Komeito leadership. In 1970, Takeiri dived into the heavily polluted Tokyo Bay to collect samples for a Komeito-managed environmental survey of bay waters in Tokyo and Osaka. On 21 September 1971, Takeiri was stabbed with a knife in front of Komeito headquarters by a thug and suffered from heavy injuries for the next three months.

Takeiri was intimately involved with Prime Minister Tanaka's plans to normalise relations with the People's Republic of China in the early 1970s, despite Komeito itself not being formally involved in the process. In July 1972, Takeiri flew to Beijing and met Zhou Enlai, and thereafter returned to report back to Tanaka and then-Foreign Minister Masayoshi Ōhira. In addition, Takeiri was also a part of a Komeito delegation to North Korea in that same year, where he met Kim Il Sung.

In 1974, Soka Gakkai and the Japanese Communist Party secretly agreed to a ten-year accord of reconciliation, and, in addition, Kenji Miyamoto and Daisaku Ikeda had held multiple meetings with each other in that year. These interactions came to light in 1975 and sparked internal strife in both parties as many Japanese Communist Party members were atheists that opposed working with religious groups, whereas many Komeito members were religious anti-communists. For this reason, the two groups had refused to cooperate in the past despite both being opposition parties. Further controversy ensued when an alarmed Takeiri claimed to have never been notified of these interactions and expressed criticism of Ikeda. At the Komeito party convention in October of that year, Takeiri attempted to restore the confidence of more anti-communist members who he believed to have lost trust in the party.

At the Komeito national convention in 1978, Takeiri softened Komeito's defense policies by moving it towards the centre by muting opposition to the US-Japan Security Treaty and Japanese Self-Defense Forces. Takeiri warmed his position even further in 1981 by stating that "under the volatile international circumstances, the need for Japan to be responsible for its own security is rising."

Takeiri stepped down as Chairman of Komeito in December 1986 after having served for almost 20 years in that position. Thereafter, he became the party's Chief Advisor instead. He declined to run for the 1990 general elections and retired from politics afterwards, which had set up a precedent within Komeito circles which states that one should retire before turning 66 years old. In 1996, Takeiri was rewarded the First Class Grand Cordon of the Order of the Rising Sun.

== Controversy and later life ==
In 1998, Takeiri was expelled from Komeito after the publication of an article in the Asahi Shimbun which found marked discrepancies in Takeiri's claimed educational background concerning his experiences at the Imperial Japanese Army Air Academy. In addition, Takeiri also claimed to have attended the so-called Seiji Daigakkō, which was technically a "human resources institution" to train secretaries within the LDP, and thus was not a formal school recognised by the Ministry of Education that could be used as a valid citation for educational experience. This led to Komeito dismissing Takeiri from his position as Chief Advisor, and later on expelling him from the party in general. Soka Gakkai also decided to excommunicate Takeiri as a result.

Further controversy ensued when a 2006 internal investigation by Komeito resulted in an accusation that Takeiri embezzled party money in 1986 so as to purchase a ring for his wife, a claim which was bolstered in the official Soka Gakkai newspaper Seikyo Shimbun. This led to the filing of a civil suit in the Tokyo District Court for damages of 5.5 million yen. However, the court eventually dismissed the charges.

Takeiri died on 23 December 2023, at the age of 97.
