= 1967 Japanese general election =

- 29 January 1967

All 486 seats in the House of Representatives 244 seats needed for a majority
- Turnout: 73.98% (▲2.84pp)
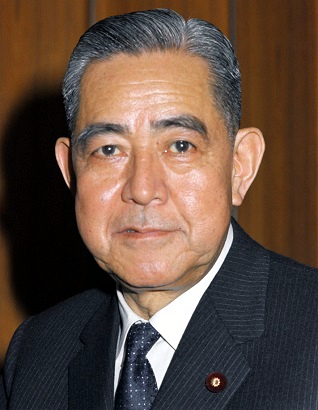

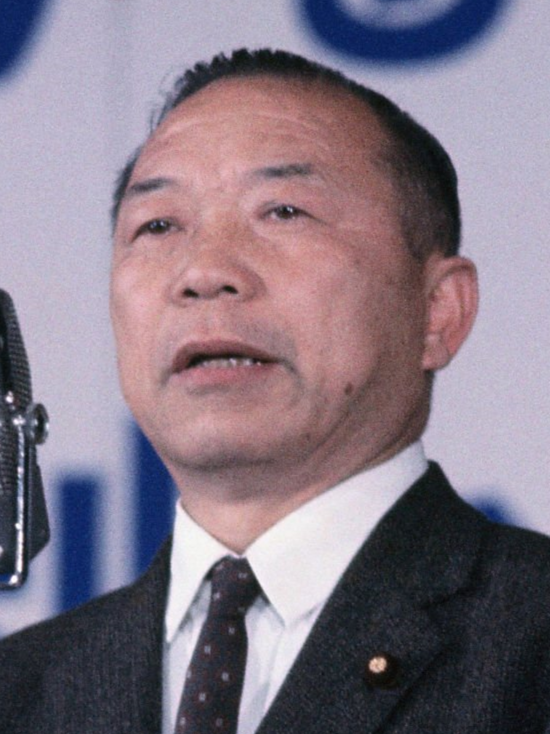

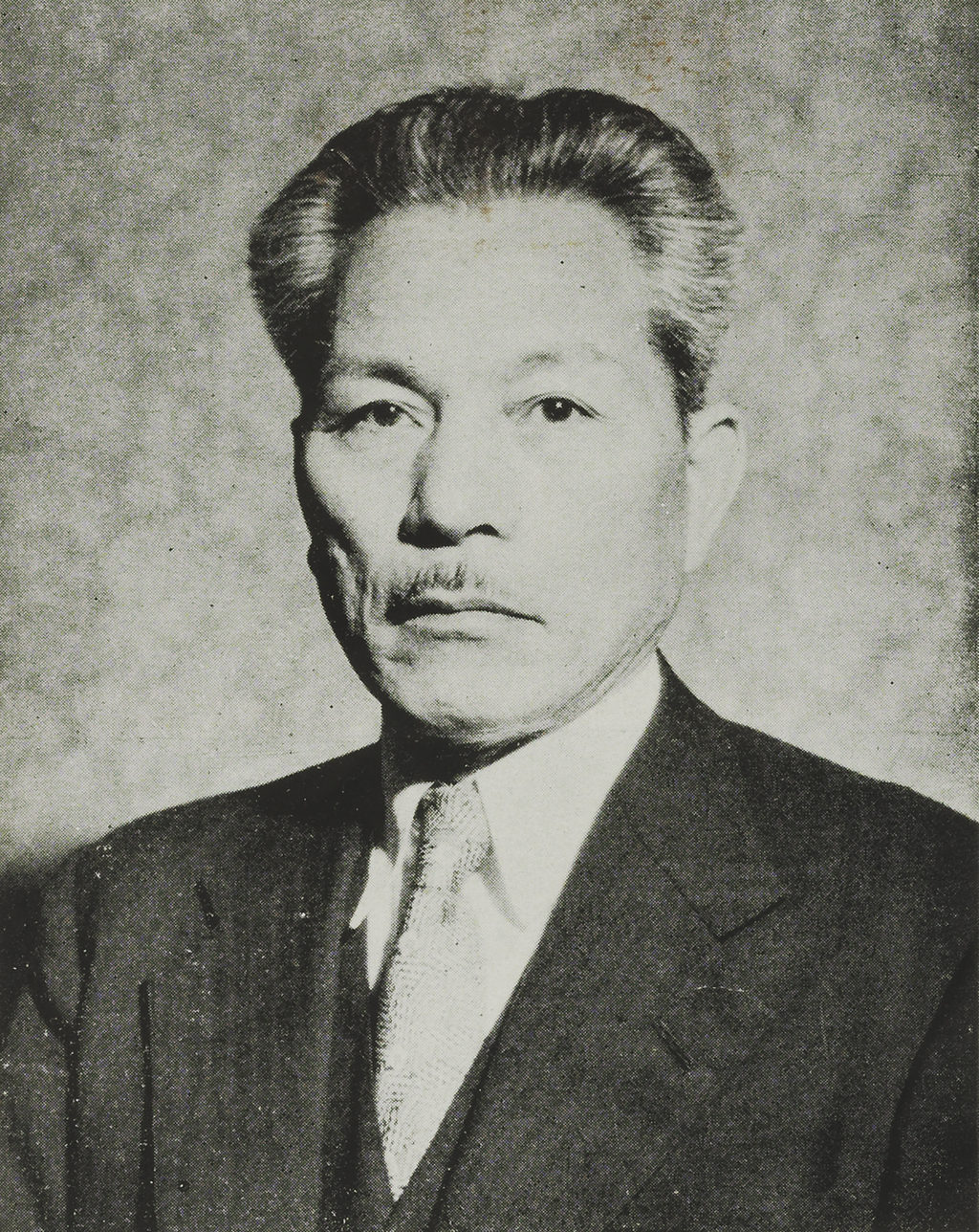

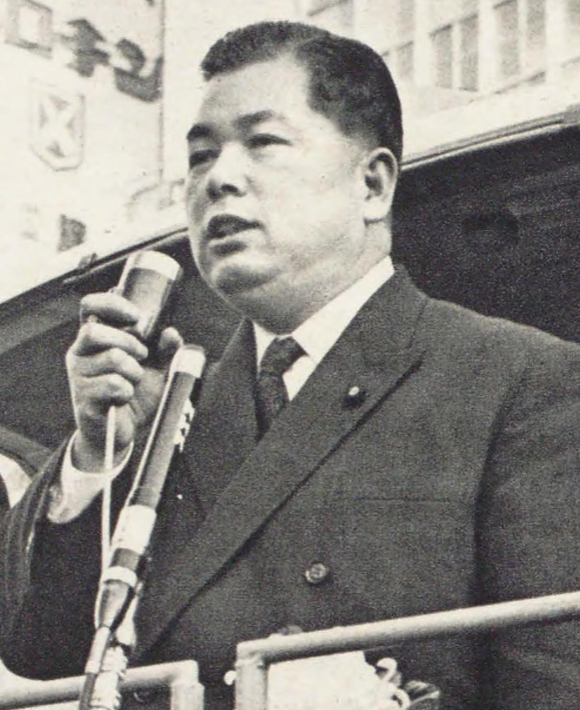
	First party	Second party
Leader	Eisaku Satō	Kōzō Sasaki
Party	LDP	Socialist
Last election	54.67%, 283 seats	29.03%, 144 seats
Seats won	277	140
Seat change	▼6	▼4
Popular vote	22,447,838	12,826,104
Percentage	48.80%	27.88%
Swing	▼5.87pp	▼1.15pp
	Third party	Fourth party
Leader	Suehiro Nishio	Takehisa Tsuji
Party	Democratic Socialist	Kōmeitō
Last election	7.37%, 23 seats	Did not exist
Seats won	30	25
Seat change	▲6	New
Popular vote	3,404,464	2,472,371
Percentage	7.40%	5.38%
Swing	▲0.03pp	New
- Districts shaded according to winners' vote strength
Prime Minister before election
Eisaku Satō
LDP
Elected Prime Minister
Eisaku Satō
LDP

General elections were held in Japan on 29 January 1967. The result was a victory for the Liberal Democratic Party, which won 277 of the 486 seats. Voter turnout was 73.99%.

Prime Minister Eisaku Satō had dissolved parliament in 1966, following a number of what was called Black Fog Incidents, such as the resignation of Transport Minister Seijuro Arafune and calls for greater reform in 1966. The results did not radically alter the landscape of Japanese politics, although both the government and opposition were disappointed; the Liberal Democratic Party's vote share fell below 50% for the first time ever, and the Japan Socialist Party also lost seats, with Kōzō Sasaki, who had served as Chairman, resigning a few months after the election. However, more minor opposition parties made gains. This was the first election in which Komeito ran, and won nearly 25 seats, with the DSP also seeing a gain of six seats to hit thirty. The Japanese Communist Party also saw a slight increase in vote count, though did not gain any seats.

== Results ==
Party	Votes	%	Seats	+/–
Liberal Democratic Party	22,447,838	48.80	277	−6
Japan Socialist Party	12,826,104	27.88	140	−4
Democratic Socialist Party	3,404,464	7.40	30	+7
Komeitō	2,472,371	5.38	25	New
Japanese Communist Party	2,190,564	4.76	5	0
Other parties	101,244	0.22	0	–
Independents	2,553,989	5.55	9	−3
Total	45,996,574	100.00	486	+19
Valid votes	45,996,574	98.71		
Invalid/blank votes	602,882	1.29		
Total votes	46,599,456	100.00		
Registered voters/turnout	62,992,796	73.98		
Source: Nohlen et al.

=== By prefecture ===
Prefecture	Total seats	Seats won					
Prefecture	Total seats	LDP	JSP	DSP	Komeitō	JCP	Ind.
Aichi	20	12	5	2	1		
Akita	8	5	2	1			
Aomori	7	4	3				
Chiba	13	10	3				
Ehime	9	7		1			1
Fukui	4	3	1				
Fukuoka	19	8	6	2	2	1	
Fukushima	12	8	3	1			
Gifu	9	6	2				1
Gunma	10	7	3				
Hiroshima	12	8	3	1			
Hokkaido	22	10	10	1	1		
Hyōgo	19	8	5	4	2		
Ibaraki	12	8	3				1
Ishikawa	6	5					1
Iwate	8	5	3				
Kagawa	6	4	2				
Kagoshima	11	8	3				
Kanagawa	14	4	5	3	2		
Kōchi	5	2	2		1		
Kumamoto	10	8	2				
Kyoto	10	4	2	2	1	1	
Mie	9	7	2				
Miyagi	9	5	3				1
Miyazaki	6	4	1	1			
Nagano	13	8	4			1	
Nagasaki	9	6	3				
Nara	5	2	2	1			
Niigata	15	9	6				
Ōita	7	5	2				
Okayama	10	5	4		1		
Osaka	23	8	4	4	6	1	
Saga	5	3	2				
Saitama	13	6	5		1		1
Shiga	5	3	2				
Shimane	5	4	1				
Shizuoka	14	8	4	1			1
Tochigi	10	6	3	1			
Tokushima	5	3	1		1		
Tokyo	39	16	13	3	6	1	
Tottori	4	3	1				
Toyama	6	4	2				
Wakayama	6	5					1
Yamagata	8	5	3				
Yamaguchi	9	6	2	1			
Yamanashi	5	2	2				1
Total	486	277	140	30	25	5	9
