= Senate (Japan) =

Upper house of the National Diet of Japan

Coordinates: 35°40′35.5″N 139°44′40.5″E

Senate 参議院 Sangiin
- 222nd Session of the National Diet

Type
- Type: Upper house of the National Diet

Leadership
- President: Masakazu Sekiguchi, LDP (caucus: independent) since 11 November 2024
- Vice President: Tetsuro Fukuyama, CDP (caucus: independent) since 1 August 2025

Structure
- Seats: 248
- Senate political groups: Government (120): LDP (101); Ishin (19); Opposition (120): CDP (39); DPFP (25); Kōmeitō (21); Sanseitō (15); JCP (7); Life (5); CPJ (2); Okinawa Whirlwind (2) (Note: Independent (2)); Team Mirai (2) (Note: Team Mirai (1); Independent (1)); SDP (2); Unaffiliated (7): LDP (1/Speaker); CDP (1/Vice Speaker); Independent (5); Vacant (1): Vacant (1)
- Senate committees: 17 committees
- Length of term: 6 years
- Salary: President: ¥2,170,000/m Vice President: ¥1,584,000/m Members: ¥1,294,000/m

Elections
- Senate voting system: Parallel voting: Single non-transferable vote (148 seats); Party-list proportional representation (100 seats); Staggered elections
- First Senate election: 20 April 1947
- Last Senate election: 20 July 2025
- Next Senate election: 2028

Meeting place
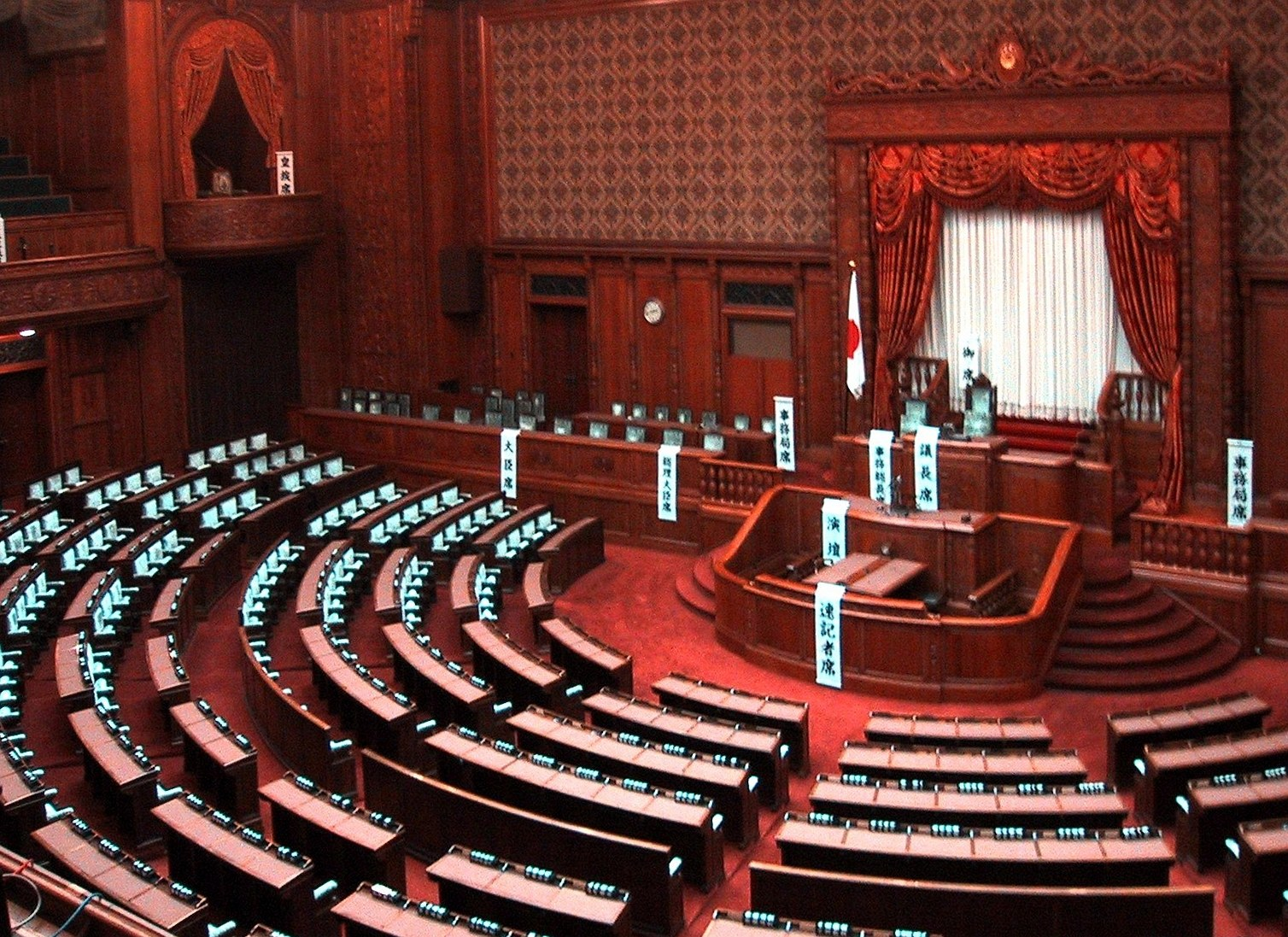
- Chamber of the Senate

Website
- www.sangiin.go.jp

The Senate (Japanese: 参議院, Hepburn: Sangiin; Japanese pronunciation: [saŋʲ.ɡʲiꜜ.iɴ, -ŋʲiꜜ-]), formerly and commonly known as the House of Councillors in English, is the upper house of the National Diet of Japan. The House of Representatives is the lower house. The Senate is the successor to the pre-war House of Peers. If the two houses disagree on matters of the budget, treaties, or the nomination of the prime minister, the House of Representatives can insist on its decision. In other decisions, the House of Representatives can override a vote of the Senate only by a two-thirds majority of members present.

The Senate has 248 members who each serve six-year terms, two years longer than those of the House of Representatives. Senators must be at least 30 years old, compared with 25 years old in the House of Representatives. The Senate cannot be dissolved, and terms are staggered so that only half of its membership is up for election every three years. Of the 124 senators subject to election each time, 74 are elected from 45 districts by single non-transferable vote (SNTV) and 50 are elected from a nationwide list by proportional representation (PR) with open lists.

The original English translation of the institution's name, 'House of Councillors', was established in 1946. In 2026, the official translation was changed to 'Senate', a name which already enjoyed some informal use before, to prevent international confusion, as the term 'Councillor' is rarely used for national-level upper houses and more frequently associated with local government.

== Roles and responsibilities ==
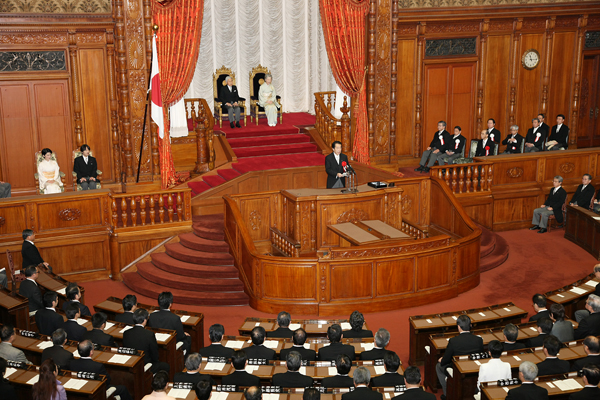
Emperor Akihito and Empress Michiko seated in the Chamber of the Senate, with Prince and Princess Akishino, the cabinet, and Prime Minister Naoto Kan giving the government's speech in front of the assembled members of parliament at a ceremony commemorating the 120th anniversary of the founding of the National Diet. (2010)

The power of the Japanese Senate is very similar to the Canadian Senate or the Irish Seanad. In central issues, there is a "supremacy of the House of Representatives" (衆議院の優越, Shūgiin no yūetsu). In the election of the prime minister, the ratification of international treaties, and on passing the budget, a decision by the House of Representatives always overrides dissent from the Senate. Only the lower house can pass votes of no-confidence against the cabinet. All other legislation requires either the approval by majorities in both houses, an agreement in the conference committee of both houses or an additional override vote by two-thirds majority in the House of Representatives. (For context, no single party achieved a two-thirds majority in the House of Representatives until the Liberal Democratic Party did in the February 2026 election.) Usually, controlling a majority in the Senate and one third of the House of Representatives is enough for a united opposition to be able to block the passage of legislation. For certain important administrative nominations by the cabinet, the approval of both houses is required (although the laws containing this requirement could be changed by two-thirds lower house override as a "nuclear option"); and constitutional amendment proposals need two-thirds majorities in both houses of the Diet to be submitted to the people in a national referendum.

One additional constitutional role of the Senate is to serve as functioning fully elected emergency legislature on its own during lower house election campaigns: While the House of Representatives is dissolved, the National Diet can not be convened, and therefore no law can be passed in regular procedure; but in urgent cases requiring parliamentary action (e.g. election management, provisional budgets, disaster response), an emergency session (緊急集会, kinkyū shūkai) of the Senate can still be invoked to take provisional decisions for the whole Diet. Such decisions will become invalid unless confirmed by the House of Representatives as soon as the whole Diet convenes again.

The basic stipulations on the role of the Senate are subject of chapter IV of the constitution. Laws and rules containing more detailed provisions on parliamentary procedures and the relations between the two houses include the National Diet Law (国会法, Kokkai-hō), the conference committee regulations (両院協議会規程, ryōin-kyōgikai kitei), and the rules of each house (衆議院/参議院規則, Shūgiin/Sangiin kisoku).

=== Constitutional practice ===
In practice, governments often tried to ensure legislative majorities, either by forming coalition governments with safe legislative majorities in the first place or by negotiating with part of the opposition, or avoided to submit bills with no prospects of passage, so the Senate rarely voted against the decisions reached by the lower house for much of postwar history: As the Liberal Democratic Party (LDP), founded in 1955, often held majorities in both houses or was sufficiently close to control both houses together with independents and micro-parties for a long period, inter-chamber disagreement was rare during most of the 1955 System.

After the opposition victory in the 1989 election, the relative importance of the Senate initially increased, as the LDP continued to govern alone and did not hold a two-thirds majority in the House of Representatives. Crucial legislation had to be negotiated with parts of the opposition. The most prominent example was the so-called "PKO Diet" (PKO国会, PKO Kokkai) of 1992 when the LDP negotiated and passed the peace-keeping operations bill with centre-left/right-of-JSP opposition parties (DSP and Kōmeitō) against fierce opposition from JSP and JCP; the Peace-Keeping Operations law (PKO law) became the base for the Self-Defense Forces' first ground deployment abroad as part of the UN mission in Cambodia. After the 1993 House of Representatives election, with the exception of a brief minority government in 1994, coalition governments or the confidence and supply arrangement during the restored LDP single-party government ensured legislative government majorities until the opposition victory in the 1998 Senate election which led to the formation of another coalition government by 1999.

The legislative two-thirds override power of the House of Representatives was never used between 1950s and 2008 when the LDP-Kōmeitō coalition government had lost the Senate majority in the 2007 election, but did control a two-thirds majority in the House of Representatives since 2005. After that, it has been used somewhat more frequently (see 衆議院の再議決, Shūgin no saikaketsu, "Override decisions by the House of Representatives" for a list). If a government controls a two-thirds majority in the House of Representatives and is willing to use it, the Senate can only delay a bill, but not prevent passage.

Opposition control of the Senate is often summarized by the term nejire Kokkai (ねじれ国会, "twisted" or "skewed" Diet). Setting aside the immediate postwar years, when many governments were in the minority in the upper house, but the strongest force, the centrist Ryokufūkai, was not in all-out opposition to either centre-left or centre-right governments and willing to cooperate, the Diet was "twisted" from 1989 to 1993, 1998–1999, 2007–2009, and most recently 2010–2013.

=== "Gridlock" and reform proposals ===
In recent years, many constitutional revision advocates call for reforming the role of the Senate ("carbon copy" of the House of Representatives or "recalcitrant naysayer") or abolishing it altogether to "prevent political paralysis", after the recently more frequent twisted Diets have seen an increase in inter-chamber friction/"political nightmare"s. Examples of high-stakes, internationally noted conflicts in recent twisted Diets:

- In 2008, two nominees for BoJ governor by the Fukuda Cabinet (Toshirō Mutō, Kōji Tanami) were rejected by the DPJ-led opposition in the Senate, and the SDF naval support mission for NATO/OEF in the Indian Ocean had to be interrupted for one month while the extension of the anti-terrorism law was delayed by the extended legislative proceedings necessary to override the Senate rejection.
- In 2011, the Kan Cabinet struggled to pass a renewable energy bill and a bond ceiling increase (unlike the budget itself subject to the normal legislative procedure) against the LDP-led opposition majority in the Senate until it negotiated a deal with the LDP in exchange for child allowance reform and the cabinet's resignation which Kan had already announced, but conditioned on the passage of the bills.

== Membership and elections ==
Article 102 of the Japanese Constitution provided that half of those elected in the first Senate election in 1947 would be up for re-election three years later in order to introduce staggered six-year terms. These were Japan's first directly elected senators.

The Senate initially had 250 senators. Two seats were added to it in 1970 after the agreement on the repatriation of Okinawa, increasing the total number to 252. Legislation aimed at addressing malapportionment that favoured less populated prefectures was introduced in 2000; this resulted in ten seats being removed (five each at the 2001 and 2004 elections), bringing the total number of seats to 242. Further reforms to address malapportionment took effect in 2007 and 2016, but did not change the total number of members in the house.

From 1947 to 1983, the Senate had 100 seats allocated to a nationwide district, of which fifty seats were allocated in each election, elected by single non-transferable vote. It was originally intended to give nationally prominent figures a route to the House without going through local electioneering processes. Some national political figures, such as feminists Shidzue Katō and Fusae Ichikawa and former Imperial Army general Kazushige Ugaki, were elected as senators through the nationwide district, along with a number of celebrities such as comedian Yukio Aoshima (later Governor of Tokyo), journalist Hideo Den and actress Yūko Mochizuki. Shintaro Ishihara won a record 3 million votes in the nationwide district in the 1968 election. The last 50-seat SNTV election took place in 1980. For the 1983 election the electoral system was changed to closed-list proportional representation; to avoid ambiguity, the nationwide district was now called the proportional district. The national proportional representation district was reduced to 96 senators in the 2000 reforms.

== Current composition ==
Composition of the Senate of the National Diet of Japan (as of 9 October 2026, 222th National Diet)
Caucus (English name) (Japanese name)	Parties	Members						
Caucus (English name) (Japanese name)	Parties	Term						Total
Caucus (English name) (Japanese name)	Parties	26 July 2022 – 25 July 2028 (elected 2022, up 2028)			29 July 2025 – 28 July 2031 (elected 2025, up 2031)			Total
Caucus (English name) (Japanese name)	Parties	PR	SNTV/FPTP	Subtotal	PR	SNTV/FPTP	Subtotal	Total
Government								120
Liberal Democratic Party and Group of Independents; Jiyūminshutō / Mushozoku no Kai	Liberal Democratic Party (LDP); Independent	18	43	61	12	28	40	101
Nippon Ishin (Japan Innovation Party); Nippon Ishin no Kai	Nippon Ishin no Kai	8	4	12	4	3	7	19
Opposition								121
The Constitutional Democratic Party of Japan and Independents; Rikken-minshu / Mushozoku	Constitutional Democratic Party (CDP); Independents	7	10	17	7	15	22	39
Democratic Party For the People and The Shin-Ryokufukai; Kokumin-minshutō / Shin-Ryokufūkai	Democratic Party For the People (DPFP)	3	4	7	7	11	18	25
Komeito; Kōmeitō	Komeito	6	7	13	4	4	8	21
Sanseito; Sanseitō	Sanseitō	1	0	1	7	7	14	15
Japanese Communist Party; Nihon Kyōsantō	Japanese Communist Party (JCP)	3	1	4	2	1	3	7
Party of Life; Inochi no Tō	Party of Life	2	0	2	3	0	3	5
Conservative Party of Japan; Nihon Hoshutō	Conservative Party of Japan	0	0	0	2	0	2	2
Okinawa Whirlwind; Okinawa no Kaze	Independents	0	1	1	0	1	1	2
Team Mirai and the Independent; Chīmu Mirai / Mushozoku no Kai	Team Mirai; Independent	0	0	0	1	1	2	2
Social Democratic Party; Shakai Minshutō	Social Democratic Party (SDP)	1	0	1	1	0	1	2
Unaffiliated		1	3	4	0	3	3	7
Independents; Members not affiliated with any parliamentary caucus	LDP 1 (President); CDP 1 (Vice President); Independents	1	3	4	0	3	3	7
Total		50	73	123	50	74	124	247
Vacant: one constituency seat in Tokyo (2028 class), vacant since the resignation of former Reiwa Shinsengumi leader, Taro Yamamoto, on 21 January 2026 (no by-election held per Public Offices Election Act; threshold of one-quarter of district seats not met)	N/A	0	1	1	0	0	0	1

== List of Senate regular elections ==
=== 20th century ===
Election	Cabinet	Prime Minister	Date	Turnout	Total seats	Elected seats	Term expiration date	Majority party / Seats share			Emperor
1st	Yoshida I	Shigeru Yoshida	20 April 1947	61.12%	250	250	2 May 1953	Socialist	47	18.80%	Shōwa (era)
2nd	Yoshida III	Shigeru Yoshida	4 June 1950	72.19%	250	125	3 June 1956	Liberal	76	30.40%	Shōwa (era)
3rd	Yoshida IV	Shigeru Yoshida	24 April 1953	63.18%	250	125	2 May 1959	Liberal	93	37.20%	Shōwa (era)
4th	I. Hatoyama III	Ichirō Hatoyama	8 July 1956	62.11%	250	125	7 July 1962	Liberal Democratic	122	48.80%	Shōwa (era)
5th	Kishi II	Nobusuke Kishi	2 June 1959	58.75%	250	125	1 June 1965	Liberal Democratic	132	52.80%	Shōwa (era)
6th	Ikeda II	Hayato Ikeda	1 July 1962	68.22%	250	125	7 July 1968	Liberal Democratic	142	56.80%	Shōwa (era)
7th	Satō I	Eisaku Satō	4 July 1965	67.02%	250	125	1 July 1971	Liberal Democratic	140	55.77%	Shōwa (era)
8th	Satō II	Eisaku Satō	7 July 1968	68.94%	250	125	7 July 1974	Liberal Democratic	142	54.80%	Shōwa (era)
9th	Satō III	Eisaku Satō	27 June 1971	59.24%	252	126	10 July 1977	Liberal Democratic	131	52.61%	Shōwa (era)
10th	K. Tanaka II	Kakuei Tanaka	7 July 1974	73.20%	252	126	7 July 1980	Liberal Democratic	126	50.40%	Shōwa (era)
11th	T. Fukuda	Takeo Fukuda	10 July 1977	68.49%	252	126	9 July 1983	Liberal Democratic	124	49.79%	Shōwa (era)
12th	Ōhira II	Masayoshi Ōhira	22 June 1980	74.54%	252	126	7 July 1986	Liberal Democratic	135	54.00%	Shōwa (era)
13th	Nakasone I	Yasuhiro Nakasone	26 June 1983	57.00%	252	126	9 July 1989	Liberal Democratic	137	54.36%	Shōwa (era)
14th	Nakasone II (R2)	Yasuhiro Nakasone	6 July 1986	71.36%	252	126	7 July 1992	Liberal Democratic	143	56.74%	Shōwa (era)
15th	Uno	Sōsuke Uno	23 July 1989	65.02%	252	126	22 July 1995	Liberal Democratic	109	43.25%	Akihito (Heisei) (era)
16th	Miyazawa	Kiichi Miyazawa	26 July 1992	50.72%	252	126	25 July 1998	Liberal Democratic	107	42.46%	Akihito (Heisei) (era)
17th	Murayama	Tomiichi Murayama	23 July 1995	44.52%	252	126	22 July 2001	Liberal Democratic	111	44.04%	Akihito (Heisei) (era)
18th	Hashimoto II (R)	Ryutaro Hashimoto	12 July 1998	58.84%	252	126	25 July 2004	Liberal Democratic	103	40.87%	Akihito (Heisei) (era)

=== 21st century ===
Election	Cabinet	Prime Minister	Date	Turnout	Total seats	Elected seats	Term expiration date	Majority party / Seats share			Emperor
19th	Koizumi I	Junichiro Koizumi	29 July 2001	56.44%	247	121	28 July 2007	Liberal Democratic	111	44.93%	Akihito (Heisei) (era)
20th	Koizumi II	Junichiro Koizumi	11 July 2004	56.57%	242	121	25 July 2010	Liberal Democratic	115	47.52%	Akihito (Heisei) (era)
21st	S. Abe I	Shinzo Abe	29 July 2007	58.64%	242	121	28 July 2013	Democratic	109	45.04%	Akihito (Heisei) (era)
22nd	Kan	Naoto Kan	11 July 2010	57.92%	242	121	25 July 2016	Democratic	106	43.80%	Akihito (Heisei) (era)
23rd	S. Abe II	Shinzo Abe	21 July 2013	52.61%	242	121	28 July 2019	Liberal Democratic	115	47.52%	Akihito (Heisei) (era)
24th	S. Abe III (R1)	Shinzo Abe	10 July 2016	54.70%	242	121	25 July 2022	Liberal Democratic	121	50.00%	Akihito (Heisei) (era)
25th	S. Abe IV (R1)	Shinzo Abe	21 July 2019	48.80%	245	124	28 July 2025	Liberal Democratic	113	46.12%	Naruhito (Reiwa) (era)
26th	Kishida II	Fumio Kishida	10 July 2022	52.05%	248	124	25 July 2028	Liberal Democratic	119	47.98%	Naruhito (Reiwa) (era)
27th	Ishiba II	Shigeru Ishiba	20 July 2025	58.51%	248	125	28 July 2031	Liberal Democratic	101	40.73%	Naruhito (Reiwa) (era)

== See also ==
- President of the Senate of Japan
- List of current senators
- List of districts of the Senate of Japan
