= Second Nakasone cabinet =

Cabinet of Japan (1983–1986)

Second Nakasone Cabinet
- 72nd Cabinet of Japan

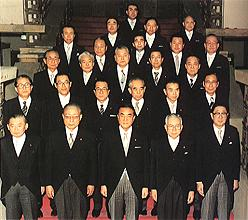
- Date formed: December 27, 1983
- Date dissolved: November 1, 1984

People and organisations
- Emperor: Shōwa
- Prime Minister: Yasuhiro Nakasone
- Member parties: Liberal Democratic Party; New Liberal Club
- Status in legislature: Majority government (Lower House)
- Opposition parties: Japan Socialist Party; Kōmeitō; Democratic Socialist Party; Japanese Communist Party

History
- Predecessor: First Nakasone Cabinet
- Successor: Second Nakasone Cabinet (First Reshuffle)

The Second Nakasone Cabinet is the 72nd Cabinet of Japan headed by Yasuhiro Nakasone from December 27, 1983, to July 22, 1986.

== Cabinet ==
| Portfolio | Minister | Political party | Special mission etc. | Note |
|---|---|---|---|---|
| Prime Minister | Yasuhiro Nakasone | Liberal Democratic | | |
| Minister of Justice | Eisaku Sumi | Liberal Democratic | | |
| Minister for Foreign Affairs | Shintaro Abe | Liberal Democratic | | |
| Minister of Finance | Noboru Takeshita | Liberal Democratic | | |
| Minister of Education | Yoshirō Mori | Liberal Democratic | | |
| Minister of Health | Kōzō Watanabe | Liberal Democratic | | |
| Minister of Agriculture, Forestry and Fisheries | Shinjirō Yamamura | Liberal Democratic | | |
| Minister of International Trade and Industry | Hikosaburo Okonogi | Liberal Democratic | | |
| Minister of Transport | Kichizō Hosoda | Liberal Democratic | | |
| Minister of Posts | Keiwa Okuda | Liberal Democratic | | |
| Minister of Labor | Misoji Sakamoto | Liberal Democratic | | |
| Minister of Construction | Kiyoshi Mizuno | Liberal Democratic | | |
| Minister of Home Affairs; Chair of the National Public Safety Commission | Seiichi Tagawa | New Liberal Club | | |
| Chief Cabinet Secretary | Takao Fujinami | Liberal Democratic | | |
| Director-General of the Prime Minister's Office | Ichirō Nakanishi | Liberal Democratic | for Crisis Management; In charge of reuse issues at the former Japanese Embassy in Berlin (Note: Appointed on July 4, 1984) | Abolished on July 1, 1984 |
| Director of the Okinawa Regional Development Agency | Ichirō Nakanishi | Liberal Democratic | for Crisis Management; In charge of reuse issues at the former Japanese Embassy in Berlin | |
| Director of the Administrative Management Agency | Masaharu Gotōda | Liberal Democratic | | Abolished on July 1, 1984 |
| Director of the Management and Coordination Agency | Masaharu Gotōda | Liberal Democratic | | Established on July 1, 1984 |
| Director of the Hokkaido Regional Development Agency; Director of the National Land Agency | Sakonshirō Inamura | Liberal Democratic | | |
| Director of the Defense Agency | Yūkō Kurihara | Liberal Democratic | | |
| Director of the Economic Planning Agency | Toshio Kōmoto | Liberal Democratic | In charge of introducing foreign economic and private sector vitality | |
| Director of the Science and Technology Agency | Michiyuki Isurugi | Liberal Democratic | | |
| Director of the Environment Agency | Minoru Ueda | Liberal Democratic | | |
| Deputy Chief Cabinet Secretary | Toyohiko Mizuhira | Liberal Democratic | | for Political Affairs |
| Deputy Chief Cabinet Secretary | Shōichi Fujimori | Bureaucrat | | for General Affairs |
| Director-General of the Cabinet Legislation Bureau | Takashi Mogushi | Bureaucrat | | |
| Deputy Chief Cabinet Secretary for the Prime Minister's Office | Mitsuo Horiuchi | Liberal Democratic | | for Political Affairs; Abolished on July 1, 1984 |
| Deputy Chief Cabinet Secretary for the Prime Minister's Office | Susumu Yamaji | Bureaucrat | | for General Affairs; Abolished on July 1, 1984 |

== First Reshuffled Cabinet ==
Second Nakasone Cabinet (First Reshuffle)
- 72nd Cabinet of Japan

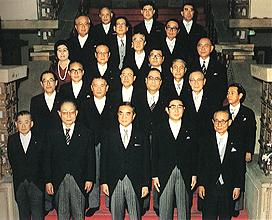
- Date formed: November 1, 1984
- Date dissolved: December 28, 1985

People and organisations
- Emperor: Shōwa
- Prime Minister: Yasuhiro Nakasone
- Member parties: Liberal Democratic Party; New Liberal Club
- Status in legislature: Majority government (Lower House)
- Opposition parties: Japan Socialist Party; Kōmeitō; Democratic Socialist Party; Japanese Communist Party

History
- Predecessor: Second Nakasone Cabinet
- Successor: Second Nakasone Cabinet (Second Reshuffle)

The first Cabinet reshuffle took place on November 1, 1984.

| Portfolio | Minister | Political party | Special mission etc. | Note |
|---|---|---|---|---|
| Prime Minister | Yasuhiro Nakasone | Liberal Democratic | | |
| Minister of Justice | Hitoshi Shimasaki | Liberal Democratic | | |
| Minister for Foreign Affairs | Shintaro Abe | Liberal Democratic | | |
| Minister of Finance | Noboru Takeshita | Liberal Democratic | | |
| Minister of Education | Hikaru Matsunaga | Liberal Democratic | | |
| Minister of Health | Hiroyuki Masuoka | Liberal Democratic | | |
| Minister of Agriculture, Forestry and Fisheries | Moriyoshi Satō | Liberal Democratic | | |
| Minister of International Trade and Industry | Keijirō Murata | Liberal Democratic | | |
| Minister of Transport | Tokuo Yamashita | Liberal Democratic | In charge of New Tokyo International Airport issues | |
| Minister of Posts | Megumu Satō | Liberal Democratic | | |
| Minister of Labor | Toshio Yamaguchi | New Liberal Club | | |
| Minister of Construction | Yoshiaki Kibe | Liberal Democratic | | |
| Minister of Home Affairs; Chair of the National Public Safety Commission | Tōru Furuya | Liberal Democratic | | |
| Chief Cabinet Secretary | Takao Fujinami | Liberal Democratic | | |
| Director of the Management and Coordination Agency | Masaharu Gotōda | Liberal Democratic | | |
| Director of the National Land Agency; Director of the Hokkaido Regional Development Agency | Kakuzo Kawamoto | Liberal Democratic | | |
| Director of the Okinawa Regional Development Agency | Toshio Kōmoto | Liberal Democratic | In charge of introducing foreign economic and private sector vitality | Resigned on August 14, 1985 |
| Director of the Okinawa Regional Development Agency | Takao Fujimoto | Liberal Democratic | In charge of introducing foreign economic and private sector vitality | Appointed on August 14, 1985 |
| Director of the Defense Agency | Koichi Kato (politician, born 1939) | Liberal Democratic | | |
| Director of the Economic Planning Agency | Ippei Kaneko | Liberal Democratic | | |
| Director of the Science and Technology Agency | Reiichi Takeuchi | Liberal Democratic | Chair of the Atomic Energy Commission | |
| Director of the Environment Agency | Shigeru Ishimoto | Liberal Democratic | | |
| Deputy Chief Cabinet Secretary | Taku Yamasaki | Liberal Democratic | | for Political Affairs |
| Deputy Chief Cabinet Secretary | Shōichi Fujimori | Bureaucrat | | for General Affairs |
| Director-General of the Cabinet Legislation Bureau | Takashi Mogushi | Bureaucrat | | |

== Second Reshuffled Cabinet ==
Second Nakasone Cabinet (Second Reshuffle)
- 72nd Cabinet of Japan

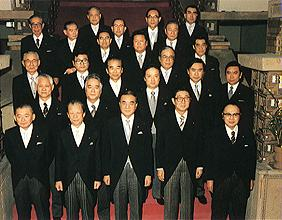
- Date formed: December 28, 1985
- Date dissolved: July 22, 1986

People and organisations
- Emperor: Shōwa
- Prime Minister: Yasuhiro Nakasone
- Member parties: Liberal Democratic Party; New Liberal Club
- Status in legislature: Majority government (Lower House)
- Opposition parties: Japan Socialist Party; Kōmeitō; Democratic Socialist Party; Japanese Communist Party

History
- Elections: 38th general election (1986); 14th Councillors election (1986)
- Predecessor: Second Nakasone Cabinet (First Reshuffle)
- Successor: Third Nakasone Cabinet

The second Cabinet reshuffle took place on December 28, 1985.

| Portfolio | Minister | Political party | Special mission etc. | Note |
|---|---|---|---|---|
| Prime Minister | Yasuhiro Nakasone | Liberal Democratic | | |
| Minister of Justice | Seigo Suzuki | Liberal Democratic | | |
| Minister for Foreign Affairs | Shintaro Abe | Liberal Democratic | | |
| Minister of Finance | Noboru Takeshita | Liberal Democratic | | |
| Minister of Education | Toshiki Kaifu | Liberal Democratic | | |
| Minister of Health | Isamu Imai | Liberal Democratic | | |
| Minister of Agriculture, Forestry and Fisheries | Tsutomu Hata | Liberal Democratic | | |
| Minister of International Trade and Industry | Michio Watanabe | Liberal Democratic | | |
| Minister of Transport | Hiroshi Mitsuzuka | Liberal Democratic | In charge of New Tokyo International Airport issues | |
| Minister of Posts | Bunsei Satō | Liberal Democratic | | |
| Minister of Labor | Yū Hayashi | Liberal Democratic | | |
| Minister of Construction | Takami Eto | Liberal Democratic | | |
| Minister of Home Affairs; Chair of the National Public Safety Commission | Ichirō Ozawa | Liberal Democratic | | |
| Chief Cabinet Secretary | Masaharu Gotōda | Liberal Democratic | | |
| Director of the Management and Coordination Agency | Masumi Esaki | Liberal Democratic | In charge of introducing foreign economic and private sector vitality | |
| Director of the Hokkaido Regional Development Agency; Director of the Okinawa Regional Development Agency | Raishirō Koga | Liberal Democratic | | |
| Director of the Defense Agency | Koichi Kato (politician, born 1939) | Liberal Democratic | | |
| Director of the Economic Planning Agency | Wataru Hiraizumi | Liberal Democratic | | |
| Director of the Science and Technology Agency | Yōhei Kōno | New Liberal Club | Chair of the Atomic Energy Commission | |
| Director of the Environment Agency | Yoshihide Mori | Liberal Democratic | | |
| Director of the National Land Agency | Heihachirō Yamazaki | Liberal Democratic | | |
| Deputy Chief Cabinet Secretary | Shunjirō Karasawa | Liberal Democratic | | for Political Affairs |
| Deputy Chief Cabinet Secretary | Shōichi Fujimori | Bureaucrat | | for General Affairs |
| Director-General of the Cabinet Legislation Bureau | Takashi Mogushi | Bureaucrat | | |
