= Gunma 3rd district (1947–1993) =

Legislative district of Japan

Gunma 3rd district was a constituency of the House of Representatives in the Diet of Japan (national legislature). Between 1947 and 1993 it elected four representatives by single non-transferable vote. As of 1993, it comprised the cities of Takasaki, Shibukawa, Fujioka, Tomioka, Annaka and the Gunma, Kitagunma, Tano, Kanra, Usui and Agatsuma districts.

The district was a traditional "conservative kingdom" (hoshu-ōkoku), a stronghold of the Liberal Democratic Party (LDP) and its predecessors. It was, most notably, represented by several faction leaders and later prime ministers:

- Yasuhiro Nakasone, Takeo Fukuda and later his son Yasuo – all three prime ministers – from the conservative anti-mainstream (Democratic Party, Progressive Party, Hatoyama faction) and
- Keizo Obuchi and previously his father Mitsuhei from the conservative mainstream (Democratic Liberal Party, Liberal Party, Yoshida faction).

With only two exceptions Gunma's 3rd district was represented by three conservatives and one candidate from the Japan Socialist Party (JSP). Tsuruo Yamaguchi, in the 1980s JSP secretary-general, was elected eleven times between 1960 and 1993, never receiving the most votes and ranking second only once in 1990.

== Summary of results during the 1955 party system ==
General election		1958	1960	1963	1967	1969	1972	1976	1979	1980	1983	1986	1990	1993
LDP & conservative independents		3	2	3	3	3	3	3	3	3	3	3	3	3
Opposition	center-left	0	0	0	0	0	0	0	0	0	0	0	0	0
Opposition	JSP	1	2	1	1	1	1	1	1	1	1	1	1	1
Opposition	JCP	0	0	0	0	0	0	0	0	0	0	0	0	0
Seats up		4												

== Elected Representatives ==
election year	highest vote (top tōsen)	2nd	3rd	4th
1947	Yasuhiro Nakasone (DP)	Ryūta Komine (JLP)	Unjūrō Mutō (JSP)	Hideko Mogami (DP)
1949	Ryūta Komine (DLP)	Yasuhiro Nakasone (DP)	Unjūrō Mutō (JSP)	Mitsuhei Obuchi (DLP)
1952	Yasuhiro Nakasone (Progressive)	Takeo Fukuda (Ind.)	Unjūrō Mutō (JSP, left)	Budayū Kogure (LP)
1953	Yasuhiro Nakasone (Progressive)	Ryūta Komine (LP)	Unjūrō Mutō (JSP, left)	Takeo Fukuda (Ind.)
1955	Yasuhiro Nakasone (JDP)	Takeo Fukuda (JDP)	Unjūrō Mutō (JSP, left)	Toshio Kurihara (JSP, left)
1958	Takeo Fukuda (LDP)	Yasuhiro Nakasone (LDP)	Toshio Kurihara (JSP)	Mitsuhei Obuchi (LDP)
1960	Takeo Fukuda (LDP)	Yasuhiro Nakasone (LDP)	Toshio Kurihara (JSP)	Tsuruo Yamaguchi (JSP)
1963	Takeo Fukuda (LDP)	Yasuhiro Nakasone (LDP)	Keizō Obuchi (LDP)	Toshio Kurihara (JSP)
1967	Takeo Fukuda (LDP)	Yasuhiro Nakasone (LDP)	Keizō Obuchi (LDP)	Tsuruo Yamaguchi (JSP)
1969	Yasuhiro Nakasone (LDP)	Takeo Fukuda (LDP)	Tsuruo Yamaguchi (JSP)	Keizō Obuchi (LDP)
1972	Takeo Fukuda (LDP)	Yasuhiro Nakasone (LDP)	Tsuruo Yamaguchi (JSP)	Keizō Obuchi (LDP)
1976	Takeo Fukuda (LDP)	Keizō Obuchi (LDP)	Tsuruo Yamaguchi (JSP)	Yasuhiro Nakasone (LDP)
1979	Takeo Fukuda (LDP)	Yasuhiro Nakasone (LDP)	Keizō Obuchi (LDP)	Tsuruo Yamaguchi (JSP)
1980	Takeo Fukuda (LDP)	Yasuhiro Nakasone (LDP)	Tsuruo Yamaguchi (JSP)	Keizō Obuchi (LDP)
1983	Takeo Fukuda (LDP)	Yasuhiro Nakasone (LDP)	Tsuruo Yamaguchi (JSP)	Keizō Obuchi (LDP)
1986	Takeo Fukuda (LDP)	Yasuhiro Nakasone (LDP)	Tsuruo Yamaguchi (JSP)	Keizō Obuchi (LDP)
1990	Yasuo Fukuda (LDP)	Tsuruo Yamaguchi (JSP)	Yasuhiro Nakasone (Ind.)	Keizō Obuchi (LDP)
1993	Keizō Obuchi (LDP)	Yasuo Fukuda (LDP)	Tsuruo Yamaguchi (JSP)	Yasuhiro Nakasone (LDP)
