= Socialist Democratic Federation (Japan) =

Japanese political party (1978–1994)

- President: Hideo Den (1978 – 1985); Satsuki Eda (1985 – 1994)
- Founded: 26 March 1978
- Dissolved: 22 May 1994
- Split from: Japan Socialist Party
- Preceded by: Socialist Citizen's Federation; Shakai Club
- Ideology: Liberal socialism Pacifism; Reformism
- Political position: Centre to centre-left

The Socialist Democratic Federation (社会民主連合, Shakai-minshu-rengō) (SDF), also referred to in Japanese by the shortened Shaminren (社民連), was a Japanese political party that existed from 1978 to 1994. It was formed from the merger of the Socialist Citizen's Federation (社会市民連合, Shakai-shimin-rengō) and the Shakai Club (社会クラブ, Shakai-kurabu).

== History ==
The Socialist Democratic Federation was a splinter party of the Japan Socialist Party (JSP). Its emergence followed a series of upheavals involving this left-wing, opposition political party, which began with the establishment of the Democratic Socialist Party in January 1960 and the later reemergence of the Japan Communist Party (JCP). The exodus of its membership is partly attributed to the perceived pro-Communist tendencies on the part of the JSP leadership during the political crisis involving the revision of Japan's Mutual Security Treaty with the United States. Experts also blame a diminished public support for the socialist party, particularly in big cities. The process continued until the next decade when the Shaminren finally split off from JSP. By this time, JSP was already in severe disarray it was ridiculed as Ni-hon (two-volumed) Shokaito (socialist party).

The Socialist Democratic Federation became part of the non-liberal coalition that elected Morihiro Hosokawa as Japan's Prime Minister in 1993. During this election, the Shaminren obtained 0.7 percent share of the vote, securing four seats in the Japanese House of Representatives.

=== Socialist Citizen Federation (SCF) ===
In 1977, Hideo Den, Yutaka Hara and Yanosuke Narazaki defected from the SDP and formed the Shakai Club party.

In 1993, Satsuki Eda was head of the Science and Technology Agency in Morihiro Hosokawa's cabinet.

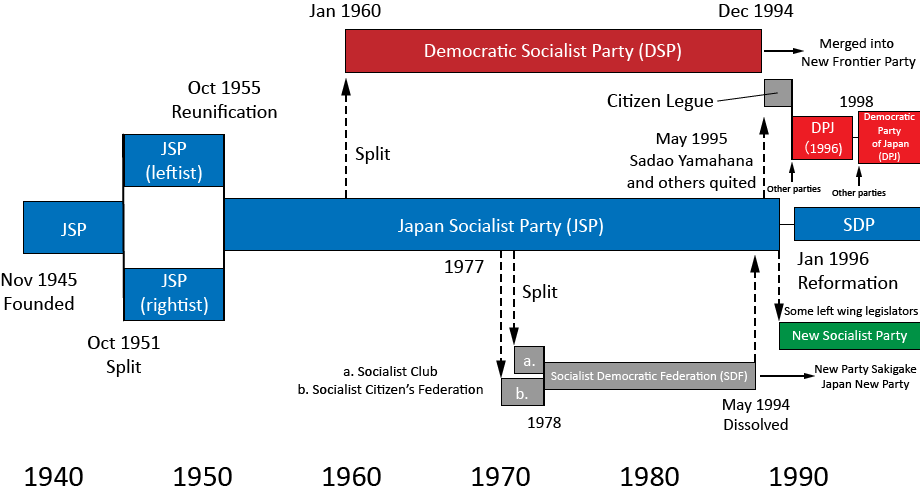
An illustration showing the relationship between the Socialist Democratic Federation and the Japan Socialist Party.

== Presidents of the SDF ==
No.	Name	Potrait	Constituency / title	Term of office	
No.	Name	Potrait	Constituency / title	Took office	Left office
Preceding parties : Socialist Citizen's Federation and Shakai Club
1	Hideo Den (1923–2009)		Cou for National district (Note: until 1983); National PR (Note: since 1983)	30 March 1978	11 February 1985
2	Satsuki Eda (1941–2021)		Rep for Okayama 1st	11 February 1985	22 May 1994

== Election results ==
=== General election results ===
Election	Leader	Seats		Position	Constituency votes		Status
Election	Leader	No.	±	Position	Number	%	Status
1979	Hideo Den	2 / 511		7th	368,660	0.62%	Opposition
1980	Hideo Den	3 / 511	▲1	7th	402,832	0.68%	Opposition
1983	Hideo Den	3 / 511	0	7th	381,045	0.67%	Opposition
1986	Satsuki Eda	4 / 512	▲1	7th	499,670	0.83%	Opposition
1990	Satsuki Eda	4 / 512	0	▲6th	566,957	0.86%	Opposition
1993	Satsuki Eda	4 / 511	0	▼9th	461,169	0.73%	SDF–JSP-Komeito-JRP-JNP-DSP-NPS-DRP coalition

=== Councillors election results ===
Election	Leader	No. of seats total	No. of seats won	No. of national votes	% of national vote	No. of prefectural votes	% of prefectural vote
1980	Hideo Den	3 / 252	1 / 126	627,273	1.12%		
1983	Hideo Den	0 / 252	0 / 126				
1986	Satsuki Eda	0 / 252	0 / 126				
1989	Satsuki Eda	0 / 252	0 / 126				
1992	Satsuki Eda	0 / 252	0 / 126				

== See also ==
- Democratic Party of Japan
- Japan New Party
- Naoto Kan
- New Party Sakigake
- New Frontier Party
