= First Nakasone cabinet =

Cabinet of Japan (1982–1983)

First Nakasone Cabinet
- 71st Cabinet of Japan

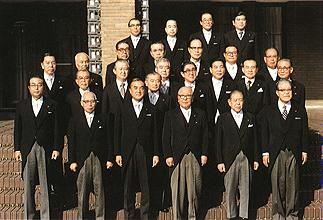
- Date formed: November 27, 1982
- Date dissolved: December 27, 1983

People and organisations
- Emperor: Shōwa
- Prime Minister: Yasuhiro Nakasone
- Member party: Liberal Democratic Party
- Status in legislature: Majority government (Lower House)
- Opposition parties: Japan Socialist Party; Kōmeitō; Democratic Socialist Party; Japanese Communist Party

History
- Elections: 13th Councillors election (1983); 37th general election (1983)
- Predecessor: Zenkō Suzuki Cabinet (Reshuffle)
- Successor: Second Nakasone Cabinet

The First Nakasone Cabinet is the 71st Cabinet of Japan headed by Yasuhiro Nakasone from November 27, 1982, to December 27, 1983.

== Cabinet ==
Portfolio	Minister	Special mission etc.	Note
Prime Minister	Yasuhiro Nakasone		
Minister of Justice	Akira Hatano		
Minister for Foreign Affairs	Shintaro Abe		
Minister of Finance	Noboru Takeshita		
Minister of Education	Mitsuo Setoyama		
Minister of Health	Yoshiro Hayashi		
Minister of Agriculture, Forestry and Fisheries	Iwazō Kaneko		
Minister of International Trade and Industry	Sadanori Yamanaka		Resigned on June 10, 1983
Minister of International Trade and Industry	Sōsuke Uno		Appointed on June 10, 1983
Minister of Transport	Takashi Hasegawa		
Minister of Posts	Tokutarō Higaki		
Minister of Labor	Akira Ōno		
Minister of Construction	Hideo Utsumi		
Minister of Home Affairs; Chair of the National Public Safety Commission	Sachio Yamamoto		
Chief Cabinet Secretary	Masaharu Gotōda		
Director-General of the Prime Minister's Office; Director of the Okinawa Development Agency Development	Hyōsuke Niwa	for Crisis Management	
Director of the Administrative Management Agency	Kunikichi Saitō		
Director of the Hokkaido Regional Development Agency; Director of the National Land Agency	Mutsuki Katō		
Director of the Defense Agency	Kazuo Tanikawa		
Director of the Economic Planning Agency	Jun Shiozaki		
Director of the Science and Technology Agency	Takaaki Yasuda	Chair of the Atomic Energy Commission	
Director of the Environment Agency	Matazō Kajiki		
Director-General of the Cabinet Legislation Bureau	Reijirō Tsunoda		Resigned on July 8, 1983
Director-General of the Cabinet Legislation Bureau	Takashi Mogushi		Appointed on July 8, 1983
Deputy Chief Cabinet Secretary	Takao Fujinami		for Political Affairs
Deputy Chief Cabinet Secretary	Shōichi Fujimori		for General Affairs
Deputy Chief Cabinet Secretary for the Prime Minister's Office	Takashi Fukaya		for Political Affairs
Deputy Chief Cabinet Secretary for the Prime Minister's Office	Susumu Yamaji		for General Affairs
