= Toshio Yamaguchi =

Japanese politician (born 1940)

- 山口 敏夫

Minister of Labour
- In office 1 November 1984 – 28 December 1985
- Prime Minister: Yasuhiro Nakasone
- Preceded by: Misoji Sakamoto
- Succeeded by: Yū Hayashi

Member of the House of Representatives
- In office 30 January 1967 – 27 September 1996
- Preceded by: Rokurōji Yamaguchi
- Succeeded by: Constituency abolished
- Constituency: Saitama 2nd

Personal details
- Born: 29 August 1940 (age 86) Higashimatsuyama, Saitama, Japan
- Party: Liberal Democratic
- Other political affiliations: NLC (1976–1986); NFP (1994–1995); People's Sovereignty Party (2016)
- Education: Meiji University

Toshio Yamaguchi (山口 敏夫, Yamaguchi Toshio; born 29 August 1940) is a Japanese politician who served as Minister of Labour and as a member of the House of Representatives in the Diet of Japan.

Yamaguchi was first elected to the House of Representatives in the 1967 general election and served ten consecutive terms in the Diet, holding his seat until the 1996 general election. He served as labour minister from 1984 to 1985 in the cabinet of Prime Minister Yasuhiro Nakasone. During his time in the Diet, he frequently appeared in the media and was dubbed the "Ushiwakamaru of politics."

In 1994, Yamaguchi persuaded the heads of Tokyo Kyowa Credit Association and Anzen Credit Bank to arrange illegal loans for companies controlled by Yamaguchi and his family. He was arrested in December 1995 and held in prison for a year pending trial. In 1996, he was found guilty of breach of trust, embezzlement, fraud and perjury, and sentenced to four years in prison. He appealed the verdict to the Tokyo High Court, and told reporters in 2002 that he was considering a return to office in 2004; his appeal was rejected in February 2003. He was taken to prison in March 2007 to serve the remaining 3.5 years of his term.

Following his release, in 2015, Yamaguchi distributed pamphlets to members of the Diet calling for former Prime Minister Yoshiro Mori to resign as head of the 2020 Summer Olympics organizing committee, causing a stir in the political world as Yamaguchi and Mori had been acquaintances since Mori was still a student.

At the age of 75, Yamaguchi entered the 2016 Tokyo gubernatorial election as a candidate of the People's Sovereignty Party (国民主権の会, Kokumin Shuken no Kai). He placed eleventh out of twenty-one candidates.

Political offices
Preceded by Misoji Sakamoto	Minister of Labour; 1984–1985	Succeeded by Yu Hayashi
House of Representatives (Japan)
Preceded by Ishimatsu Kitagawa	Chair, Foreign Affairs Committee of the House of Representatives of Japan; 1986–1987	Succeeded by Eitaro Itoyama
Preceded by Hiroshi Mitsuzuka	Chair, Rules and Administration Committee of the House of Representatives of Japan; 1988–1989	Succeeded by Hikosaburo Okonogi
Party political offices
Preceded by Party established	Chair, Diet Affairs Committee of the New Liberal Club; 1976–1979	Succeeded by Kentaro Ishihara
Preceded by Seiichi Tagawa	Secretary General of the New Liberal Club; 1980–1986	Succeeded by Party dissolved
Honorary titles
Preceded by Ryutaro Hashimoto	Youngest member of the House of Representatives of Japan; 1967–1969	Succeeded by Ichirō Ozawa
