= 1980 Japanese general election =

- 22 June 1980

All 511 seats in the House of Representatives 256 seats needed for a majority
- Turnout: 74.57% (▲6.56%)
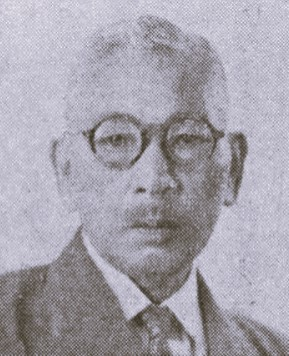

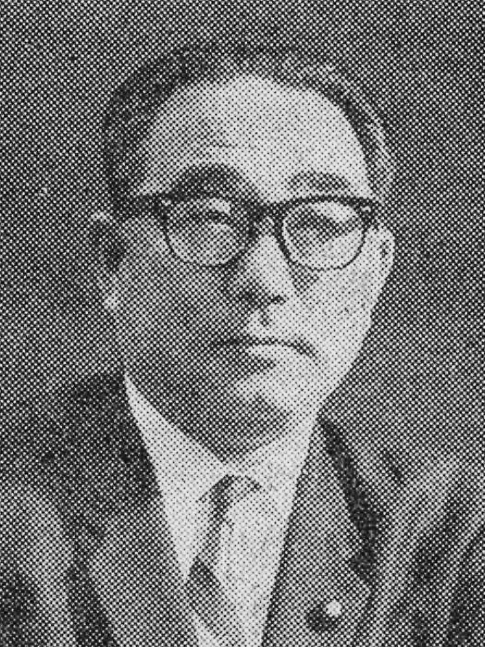

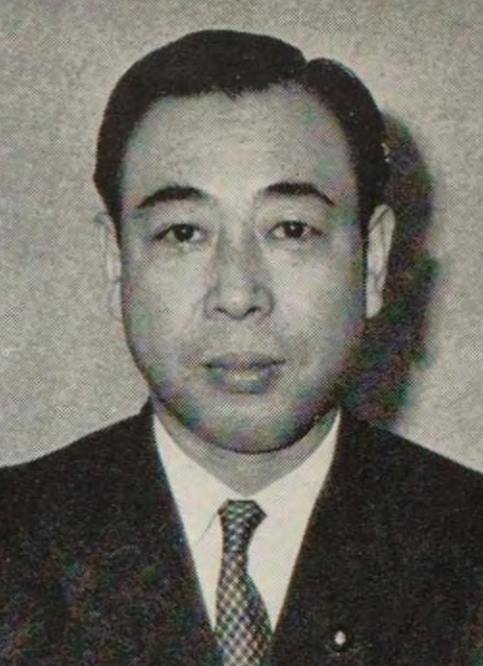

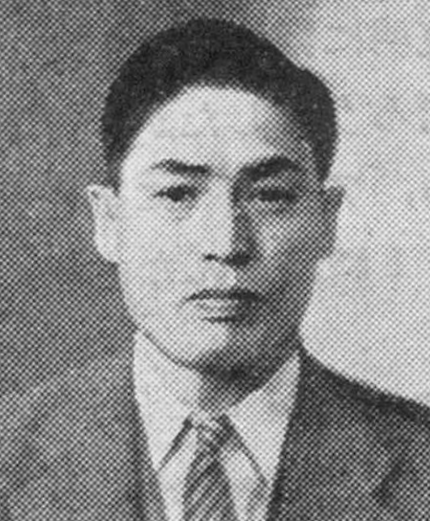

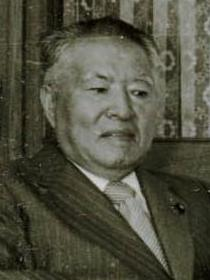

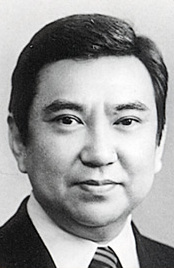
	First party	Second party	Third party
Leader	Eiichi Nishimura (acting)	Ichio Asukata	Yoshikatsu Takeiri
Party	LDP	Socialist	Kōmeitō
Last election	44.59%, 248 seats	19.71%, 107 seats	9.78%, 57 seats
Seats won	284	107	33
Seat change	▲36	Steady	▼24
Popular vote	28,262,441	11,400,748	5,329,942
Percentage	47.88%	19.31%	9.03%
Swing	▲3.29pp	▼0.40pp	▼0.74pp
	Fourth party	Fifth party	Sixth party
Leader	Sasaki Ryōsaku	Kenji Miyamoto	Yōhei Kōno
Party	Democratic Socialist	JCP	New Liberal Club
Last election	6.78%, 35 seats	10.42%, 39 seats	3.02%, 4 seats
Seats won	32	29	12
Seat change	▼4	▼10	▲8
Popular vote	3,896,728	5,803,613	1,766,396
Percentage	6.60%	9.83%	2.99%
Swing	▼0.18pp	▼0.59pp	▼0.03pp
Prime Minister before election
Masayoshi Ito (acting)
LDP
Elected Prime Minister
Zenkō Suzuki
LDP

General elections were held in Japan on 22 June 1980. The incumbent Liberal Democratic Party won an overall majority for the first time since 1972.

== Campaign ==
=== Vote of no confidence in the Ohira cabinet ===
The election was triggered following a vote of no confidence brought by the Japan Socialist Party (JSP) on 16 May 1980 regarding corruption and rises in public utility charges as reasons for the House of Representatives of Japan (lower house) to withdraw its backing from the LDP government.

Unexpectedly, 69 Liberal Democratic Party (LDP) members of the Diet from the Fukuda Takeo, Miki Takeo and Hidenao Nakagawa factions abstained from voting on the motion, leading to the fall of the government.

For the first time, the election for the House of Representatives was held in conjunction with the election for the House of Councillors on the same day.

=== Death of the Prime Minister ===
Prime Minister Masayoshi Ōhira, the leader of the Liberal Democratic Party died during the campaign. Ōhira had expected the vote of no confidence to fail, and was visibly shaken when it passed by a margin of 243–187. Given the choice of resigning or calling new elections, Ōhira chose the latter and began campaigning for LDP candidates. He was hospitalized for exhaustion on 31 May and died of a massive heart attack 12 days later.

Chief Cabinet Secretary Masayoshi Ito became acting prime minister after Ōhira's death. In the elections of both the houses LDP gained a majority. The election results for the lower house are shown in the table below. Yoshio Sakurauchi, the Secretary General of LDP, led the LDP to its greatest victory in fifteen years, capitalizing on the "sympathy vote" generated by Ōhira's death. The Prime Minister was succeeded by Zenkō Suzuki after the election.

== Results ==
Party	Votes	%	Seats	+/–
Liberal Democratic Party	28,262,442	47.88	284	+36
Japan Socialist Party	11,400,748	19.31	107	0
Japanese Communist Party	5,803,613	9.83	29	−10
Kōmeitō	5,329,942	9.03	33	−24
Democratic Socialist Party	3,896,728	6.60	32	−4
New Liberal Club	1,766,396	2.99	12	+8
Socialist Democratic Federation	402,832	0.68	3	+1
Other parties	109,168	0.18	0	–
Independents	2,056,967	3.48	11	−8
Total	59,028,836	100.00	511	0
Valid votes	59,028,836	97.82		
Invalid/blank votes	1,313,492	2.18		
Total votes	60,342,328	100.00		
Registered voters/turnout	80,925,034	74.57		
Source: Statistics Bureau of Japan, National Diet

Seats won per district

=== By prefecture ===
Prefecture	Total seats	Seats won							
Prefecture	Total seats	LDP	JSP	Kōmeitō	DSP	JCP	NLC	SDF	Ind.
Aichi	22	11	2	2	4	1			2
Akita	8	5	3						
Aomori	7	5	1				1		
Chiba	16	11	2	2					1
Ehime	9	6	3						
Fukui	4	3			1				
Fukuoka	19	9	2	3	2	2		1	
Fukushima	12	9	2				1		
Gifu	9	6	2			1			
Gunma	10	7	3						
Hiroshima	12	7	3		1				1
Hokkaido	22	11	9	1					1
Hyōgo	20	9	6	2	2	1			
Ibaraki	12	9	3						
Ishikawa	6	5	1						
Iwate	8	6	2						
Kagawa	6	4	2						
Kagoshima	11	9	2						
Kanagawa	19	5	5	3	2	1	3		
Kōchi	5	2	1	1		1			
Kumamoto	10	7	2						1
Kyoto	10	3		2	2	2			1
Mie	9	6	2		1				
Miyagi	9	6	2	1					
Miyazaki	6	5			1				
Nagano	13	7	4		1	1			
Nagasaki	9	5	2		1				1
Nara	5	2	1		1	1			
Niigata	15	8	5						2
Ōita	7	5	1		1				
Okayama	10	6	2	1	1				
Okinawa	5	2	1	1		1			
Osaka	26	7	3	6	3	6	1		
Saga	5	4	1						
Saitama	15	9	3		1	1	1		
Shiga	5	2	1		1	1			
Shimane	5	3	2						
Shizuoka	14	8	1	1	2	1			1
Tochigi	10	6	3		1				
Tokushima	5	4	1						
Tokyo	43	15	7	6	2	7	5	1	
Tottori	4	2	2						
Toyama	6	5	1						
Wakayama	6	3	1	1		1			
Yamagata	8	5	2					1	
Yamaguchi	9	6	2		1				
Yamanashi	5	4	1						
Total	511	284	107	33	32	29	12	3	11
