= 1979 Japanese general election =

- 7 October 1979

All 511 seats in the House of Representatives 256 seats needed for a majority
- Turnout: 68.01% (▼5.44pp)
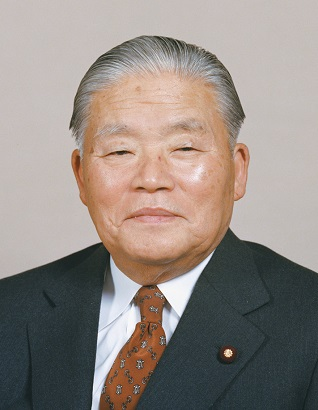

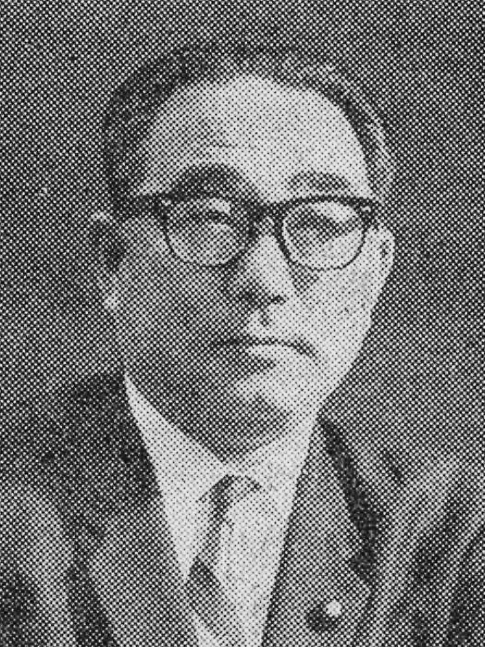

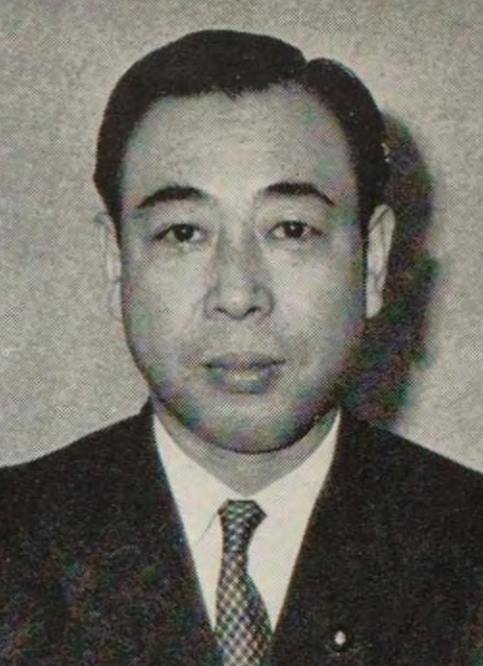

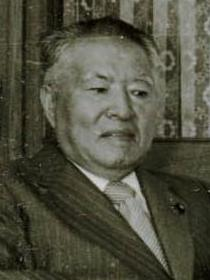

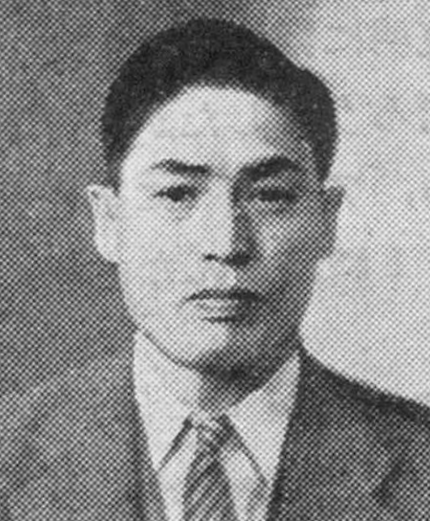

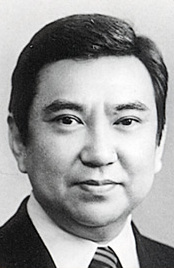

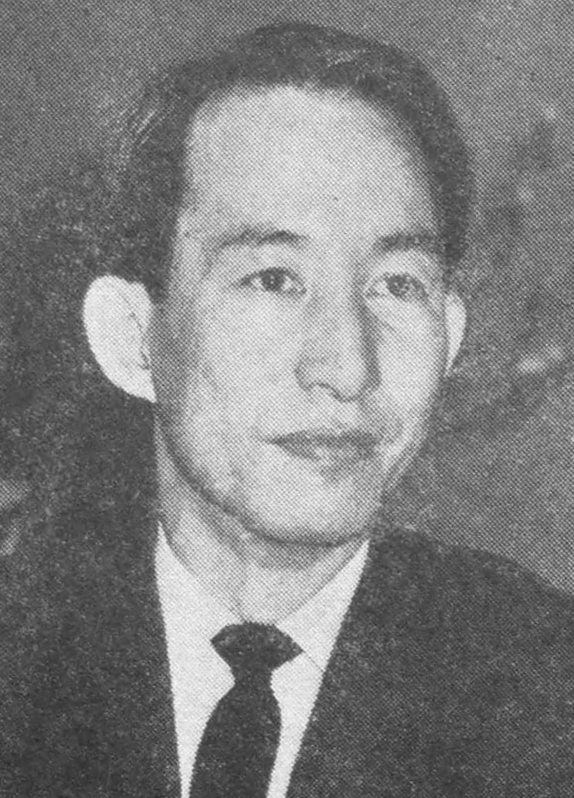
	First party	Second party	Third party
Leader	Masayoshi Ōhira	Ichio Asukata	Yoshikatsu Takeiri
Party	LDP	Socialist	Kōmeitō
Last election	41.78%, 249 seats	20.69%, 123 seats	10.91%, 55 seats
Seats won	248	107	57
Seat change	▼1	▼16	▲2
Popular vote	24,084,131	10,643,450	5,282,683
Percentage	44.59%	19.71%	9.78%
Swing	▲2.81pp	▼0.98pp	▼1.13pp
	Fourth party	Fifth party	Sixth party
Leader	Kenji Miyamoto	Sasaki Ryōsaku	Yōhei Kōno
Party	JCP	Democratic Socialist	New Liberal Club
Last election	10.38%, 17 seats	6.28%, 29 seats	4.18%, 17 seats
Seats won	39	35	4
Seat change	▲22	▲6	▼13
Popular vote	5,625,528	3,663,692	1,631,812
Percentage	10.42%	6.78%	3.02%
Swing	▼0.04pp	▲0.50pp	▼1.16pp
	Seventh party
Leader	Hideo Den
Party	Socialist Democratic
Last election	–
Seats won	2
Seat change	New
Popular vote	368,660
Percentage	0.68%
Swing	New
Prime Minister before election
Masayoshi Ōhira
LDP
Elected Prime Minister
Masayoshi Ōhira
LDP

General elections were held in Japan on 7 October 1979 to elect the 511 members of the House of Representatives. Prime Minister Ōhira Masayoshi's announcement that a consumption (sales) tax would be imposed was a hot-button issue in the run-up to the election. Facing widespread public disapproval, the prime minister abandoned the tax proposal. The prime minister's party, the Liberal Democratic Party (LDP), ended up losing one seat, while the Japan Communist Party experienced a surge in voter support and its best ever electoral result, which mostly came at the expense of the Japan Socialist Party and the LDP-breakaway New Liberal Club.

This was the first election in the LDP's history in which the party increased its share of the popular vote compared to the previous election.

== Results ==
Party	Votes	%	Seats	+/–
Liberal Democratic Party	24,084,131	44.59	248	−1
Japan Socialist Party	10,643,450	19.71	107	−16
Japanese Communist Party	5,625,528	10.42	39	+22
Kōmeitō	5,282,683	9.78	57	+2
Democratic Socialist Party	3,663,692	6.78	35	+6
New Liberal Club	1,631,812	3.02	4	−13
Socialist Democratic Federation	368,660	0.68	2	New
Other parties	69,101	0.13	0	–
Independents	2,641,064	4.89	19	−2
Total	54,010,121	100.00	511	0
Valid votes	54,010,121	99.06		
Invalid/blank votes	511,892	0.94		
Total votes	54,522,013	100.00		
Registered voters/turnout	80,169,924	68.01		
Source: Statistics Bureau of Japan, National Diet

Seats won per district

=== By prefecture ===
Prefecture	Total seats	Seats won							
Prefecture	Total seats	LDP	JSP	Kōmeitō	JCP	DSP	NLC	SDF	Ind.
Aichi	22	10	2	2	1	4			3
Akita	8	4	3		1				
Aomori	7	5	1		1				
Chiba	16	6	3	2	1				4
Ehime	9	7	2						
Fukui	4	2	1			1			
Fukuoka	19	7	4	4	1	2		1	
Fukushima	12	9	2						1
Gifu	9	6	2	1					
Gunma	10	7	3						
Hiroshima	12	8	2	1		1			
Hokkaido	22	10	8	1	1	1			1
Hyōgo	20	6	5	4	2	3			
Ibaraki	12	7	3	1					1
Ishikawa	6	5	1						
Iwate	8	6	2						
Kagawa	6	4	2						
Kagoshima	11	8	3						
Kanagawa	19	5	4	4	1	3	2		
Kōchi	5	2	1	1	1				
Kumamoto	10	5	2	1					2
Kyoto	10	2	1	2	3	2			
Mie	9	5	2	1		1			
Miyagi	9	5	1	1	1				1
Miyazaki	6	3	2			1			
Nagano	13	7	3		1	1			1
Nagasaki	9	4	2	1		1			1
Nara	5	2		1	1	1			
Niigata	15	8	5						2
Ōita	7	3	2			1			1
Okayama	10	5	1	2	1	1			
Okinawa	5	2	1	1	1				
Osaka	26	6	3	7	7	3			
Saga	5	4	1						
Saitama	15	7	2	3	1	1	1		
Shiga	5	2	1		1	1			
Shimane	5	3	1		1				
Shizuoka	14	7	2	2	1	2			
Tochigi	10	5	3	1		1			
Tokushima	5	4	1						
Tokyo	43	13	8	11	8	2	1		
Tottori	4	2	2						
Toyama	6	4	2						
Wakayama	6	3		1	2				
Yamagata	8	4	2					1	1
Yamaguchi	9	5	2	1		1			
Yamanashi	5	4	1						
Total	511	248	107	57	39	35	4	2	19
