= 1986 Japanese general election =

- 6 July 1986

All 512 seats in the House of Representatives 257 seats needed for a majority
- Turnout: 71.40% (▲3.46pp)
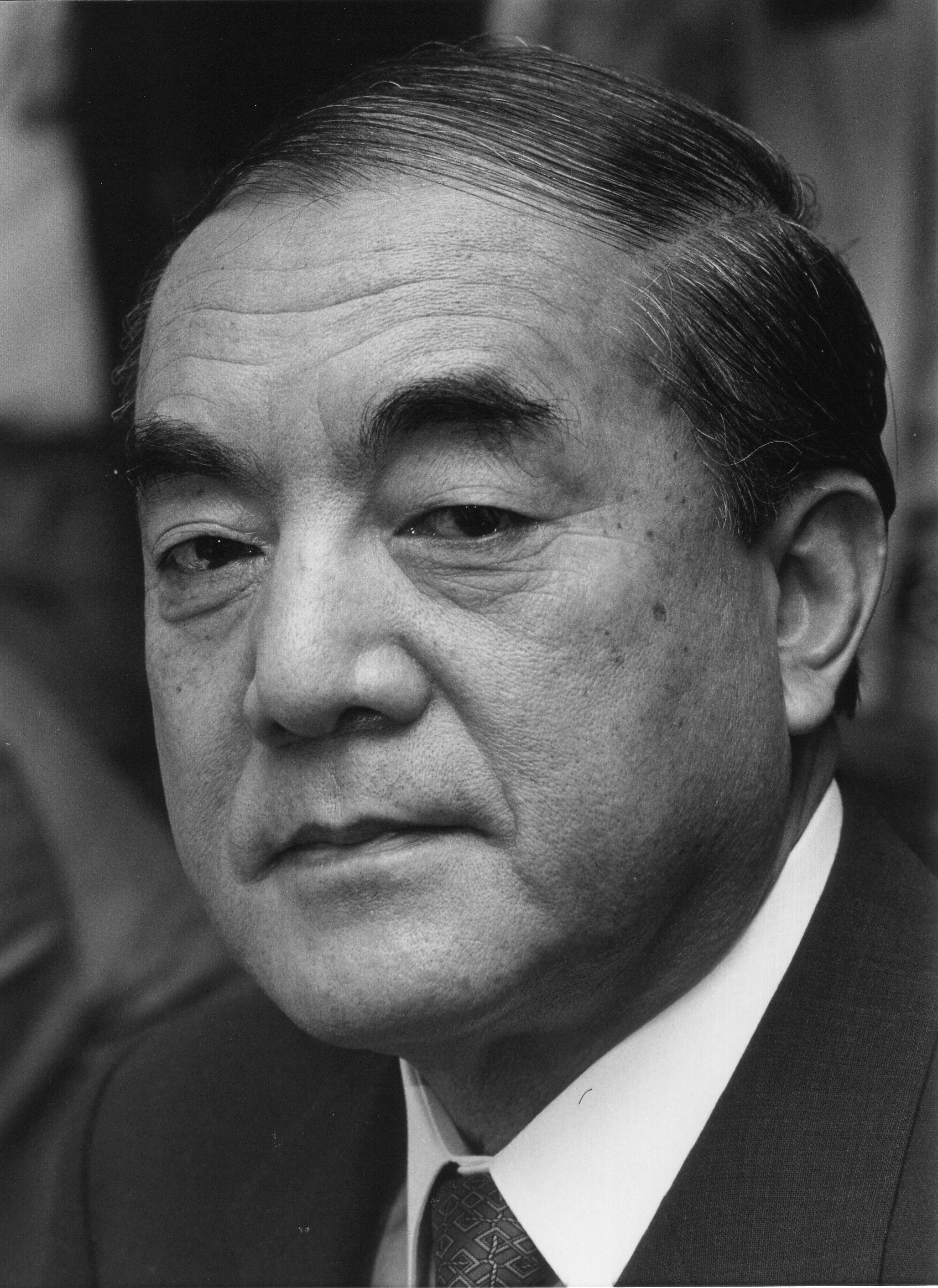

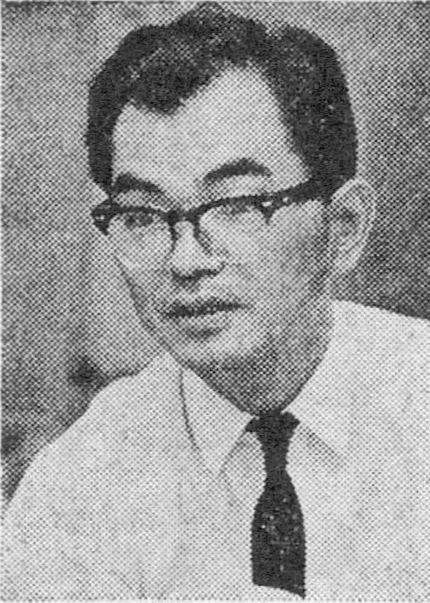

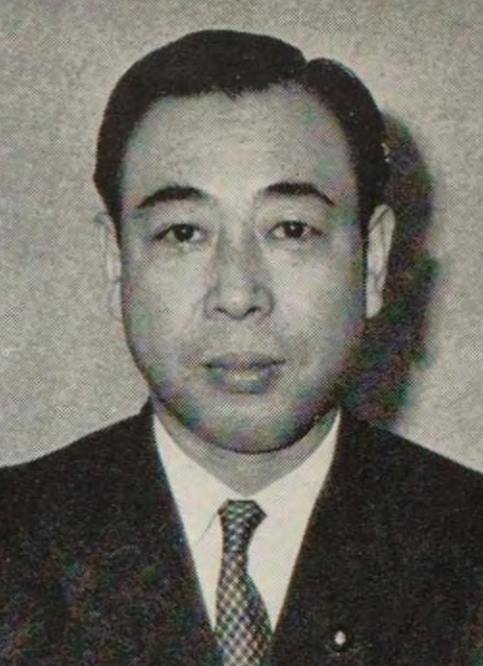

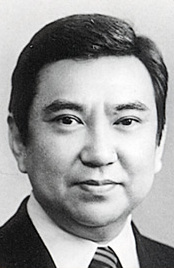
	First party	Second party	Third party
Leader	Yasuhiro Nakasone	Masashi Ishibashi	Yoshikatsu Takeiri
Party	LDP	Socialist	Kōmeitō
Last election	45.76%, 250 seats	19.49%, 112 seats	10.12%, 58 seats
Seats won	300	85	56
Seat change	▲50	▼27	▼3
Popular vote	29,875,501	10,412,584	5,701,277
Percentage	49.42%	17.23%	9.43%
Swing	▲3.66pp	▼2.26pp	▼0.69pp
	Fourth party	Fifth party	Sixth party
		DSP
Leader	Tetsuzo Fuwa	Tsukamoto Saburō	Yōhei Kōno
Party	JCP	Democratic Socialist	New Liberal Club
Last election	9.34%, 26 seats	7.27%, 38 seats	2.36%, 8 seats
Seats won	26	26	6
Seat change	Steady	▼12	▼2
Popular vote	5,313,246	3,895,858	1,114,800
Percentage	8.79%	6.44%	1.64%
Swing	▼0.55pp	▼0.83pp	▼0.72pp
Prime Minister before election
Yasuhiro Nakasone
LDP
Elected Prime Minister
Yasuhiro Nakasone
LDP

General elections were held in Japan on 6 July 1986 to elect the 512 members of the House of Representatives, alongside elections for the House of Councillors. The result was a landslide victory for the ruling Liberal Democratic Party (LDP), which gained 50 seats and an outright majority in the House. The LDP's 300 seats remained its joint-best general election result until 2026.

Most opposition parties lost seat, the exceptions being the Japanese Communist Party (which remained at 26 seats) and the Socialist Democratic Federation, which gained one seat. The biggest losses were experienced by the Japan Socialist Party, which lost 27 seats. The Democratic Socialist Party saw a 12-seat loss, while Kōmeitō saw a loss of three seats and the New Liberal Club, which had been in coalition with the LDP, lost two seats.

Prior to election day, polls indicated that the LDP would win a victory, but the size of the victory was considered unexpected. The New York Times wrote that "the fragmented opposition could not catch fire with any campaign issue." Economic policy was not sharply contested in the campaign; however, the Japanese economy had seen its first quarter of contraction in 11 years.

== Results ==
Party	Votes	%	Seats	+/–
Liberal Democratic Party	29,875,501	49.42	300	+50
Japan Socialist Party	10,412,584	17.23	85	−27
Japanese Communist Party	5,313,246	8.79	26	0
Kōmeitō	5,701,277	9.43	56	−2
Democratic Socialist Party	3,895,858	6.44	26	−12
New Liberal Club	1,114,800	1.84	6	−2
Socialist Democratic Federation	499,670	0.83	4	+1
Other parties	120,627	0.20	0	–
Independents	3,515,043	5.81	9	−7
Total	60,448,606	100.00	512	+1
Valid votes	60,448,606	97.96		
Invalid/blank votes	1,259,044	2.04		
Total votes	61,707,650	100.00		
Registered voters/turnout	86,426,845	71.40		
Source: IPU

Seats won per district

=== By prefecture ===
Prefecture	Total seats	Seats won							
Prefecture	Total seats	LDP	JSP	Kōmeitō	JCP	DSP	NLC	SDF	Ind.
Aichi	22	11	2	2	1	4			2
Akita	7	5	2						
Aomori	7	7							
Chiba	18	12	2	3	1				
Ehime	9	7	1	1					
Fukui	4	3							1
Fukuoka	19	9	4	4		1		1	
Fukushima	12	8	3			1			
Gifu	9	6	1	1					1
Gunma	10	8	2						
Hiroshima	12	9	1	1		1			
Hokkaido	23	13	7	1	1				1
Hyōgo	19	10	4	3	1	1			
Ibaraki	12	8	2	1		1			
Ishikawa	5	4	1						
Iwate	8	6	2						
Kagawa	6	5	1						
Kagoshima	10	7	3						
Kanagawa	20	5	4	4	1	2	4		
Kōchi	5	2	1	1	1				
Kumamoto	10	6	1	1					2
Kyoto	10	4		2	2	2			
Mie	9	6	2	1					
Miyagi	9	7	1	1					
Miyazaki	6	5				1			
Nagano	13	9	3			1			
Nagasaki	9	6	2			1			
Nara	5	2		1	1	1			
Niigata	13	10	2						1
Ōita	7	4	2			1			
Okayama	10	5	1	2		1		1	
Okinawa	5	2	1	1	1				
Osaka	27	7	4	7	6	3			
Saga	5	3	1						1
Saitama	17	9	2	3	1	1	1		
Shiga	5	3	1			1			
Shimane	5	3	2						
Shizuoka	14	10	2	1		1			
Tochigi	10	5	3	1		1			
Tokushima	5	3	1	1					
Tokyo	44	19	5	10	8		1	1	
Tottori	4	3	1						
Toyama	6	4	2						
Wakayama	6	4		1	1				
Yamagata	7	6						1	
Yamaguchi	9	6	2	1					
Yamanashi	5	4	1						
Total	512	300	85	56	26	26	6	4	9
