= 1983 Japanese House of Councillors election =

- 26 June 1983

126 of the 252 seats in the House of Councillors 127 seats needed for a majority
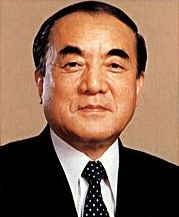

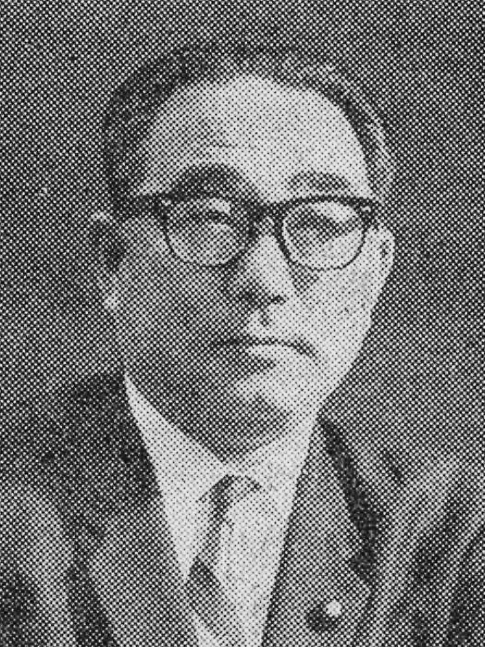

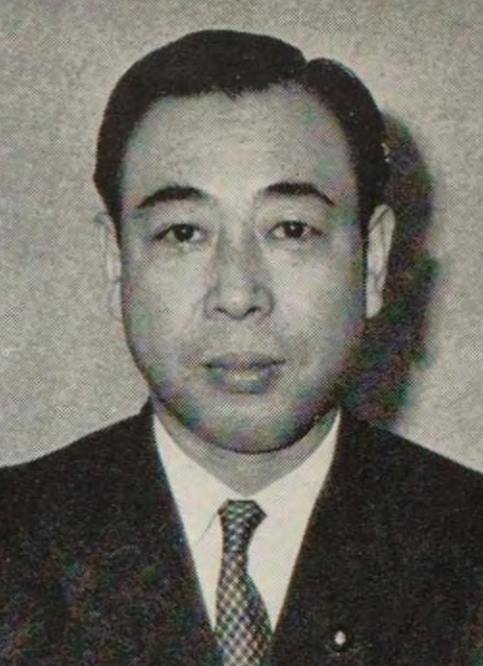

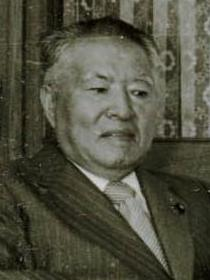

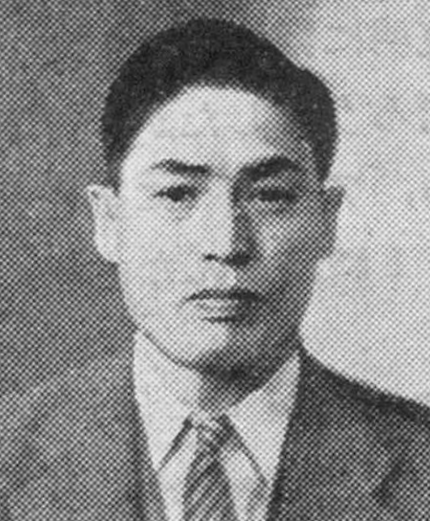
	First party	Second party	Third party
Leader	Yasuhiro Nakasone	Ichio Asukata	Yoshikatsu Takeiri
Party	LDP	Socialist	Kōmeitō
Last election	135 seats	47 seats	26 seats
Seats won	68	22	14
Seats after	137	44	26
Seat change	▲2	▼3	0
Constituency vote	19,975,034	11,217,515	3,615,995
% and swing	43.24% (▼0.03pp)	24.28% (▲1.85pp)	7.83% (▲2.86pp)
National vote	16,441,437	7,590,331	7,314,465
% and swing	35.33%	16.31%	15.72%
	Fourth party	Fifth party	Sixth party
Leader	Kenji Miyamoto	Sasaki Ryōsaku	Seiichi Tagawa
Party	JCP	Democratic Socialist	New Liberal Club
Last election	12 seats	11 seats	2 seats
Seats won	7	6	2
Seats after	14	11	2
Seat change	▲2	0	0
Constituency vote	4,859,334	2,638,780	563,811
% and swing	10.52% (▼1.21pp)	5.71% (▲0.57pp)	1.22% (▲0.60pp)
National vote	4,163,877	3,888,429	1,239,169
% and swing	8.95%	8.36%	2.66%
- Results of the election, showing the winning candidates in each prefecture and the national PR block.
President of the House
of Councillors before election
Masatoshi Tokunaga
LDP
Elected President of the House
of Councillors
Matsuo Kimura
LDP

House of Councillors elections were held in Japan on 26 June 1983. The result was a victory for the ruling Liberal Democratic Party, which won 68 of the 126 seats up for election, retaining its majority in the House.

== Results ==
Party	National			Constituency			Seats			
Party	Votes	%	Seats	Votes	%	Seats	Not up	Won	Total after	+/–
Liberal Democratic Party	16,441,437	35.33	19	19,975,034	43.24	49	69	68	137	+2
Japan Socialist Party	7,590,331	16.31	9	11,217,515	24.28	13	22	22	44	–3
Kōmeitō	7,314,465	15.72	8	3,615,995	7.83	6	12	14	26	0
Japanese Communist Party	4,163,877	8.95	5	4,859,334	10.52	2	7	7	14	+2
Democratic Socialist Party	3,888,429	8.36	4	2,638,780	5.71	2	5	6	11	0
New Party for Salaried Men	1,999,244	4.30	2				0	2	2	New
Japan Wellbeing Party	1,577,630	3.39	1				0	1	1	New
New Liberal Club	1,239,169	2.66	1	563,811	1.22	1	0	2	2	0
Dainiin Club	1,142,349	2.45	1				1	1	2	New
Other parties	1,179,997	2.54	0	1,561,835	3.38	2	2	2	4	–
Independents				1,768,021	3.83	1	5	1	6	–7
Vacant						3	0	3	3	–
Total	46,536,928	100.00	50	46,200,325	100.00	79	123	129	252	0
Valid votes	46,536,928	97.57		46,200,325	96.86					
Invalid/blank votes	1,159,404	2.43		1,500,034	3.14					
Total votes	47,696,332	100.00		47,700,359	100.00					
Registered voters/turnout	83,682,416	57.00		83,682,416	57.00					
Source: Ministry of Internal Affairs and Communications, National Diet

=== By constituency ===
Constituency	Total seats	Seats won										
Constituency	Total seats	LDP	JSP	Kōmeitō	JCP	DSP	NPSM	NLC	JWP	DC	Others	Ind.
Aichi	3	1		1		1						
Akita	1	1										
Aomori	1	1										
Chiba	2	1	1									
Ehime	1	1										
Fukui	1	1										
Fukuoka	3	1	1	1								
Fukushima	2	1	1									
Gifu	1	1										
Gunma	2	2										
Hiroshima	2	1	1									
Hokkaido	4	2	2									
Hyōgo	3	1		1		1						
Ibaraki	2	1	1									
Ishikawa	1	1										
Iwate	1	1										
Kagawa	1	1										
Kagoshima	2	1	1									
Kanagawa	2	1		1								
Kōchi	1	1										
Kumamoto	2	2										
Kyoto	2	1			1							
Mie	1	1										
Miyagi	1	1										
Miyazaki	1	1										
Nagano	2	1	1									
Nagasaki	1	1										
Nara	1	1										
Niigata	2	1	1									
Ōita	1		1									
Okinawa	1										1	
Okayama	2	1	1									
Osaka	3	1		1								1
Saga	1	1										
Saitama	2	1						1				
Shiga	1	1										
Shimane	1	1										
Shizuoka	2	2										
Tochigi	2	1	1									
Tokushima	1	1										
Tokyo	4	1		1	1						1	
Tottori	1	1										
Toyama	1	1										
Wakayama	1	1										
Yamagata	1	1										
Yamaguchi	1	1										
Yamanashi	1	1										
National	50	19	9	8	5	4	2	1	1	1		
Total	126	68	22	14	7	6	2	2	1	1	2	1
