= 1980 Japanese House of Councillors election =

- 22 June 1980

126 of the 252 seats in the House of Councillors 127 seats needed for a majority
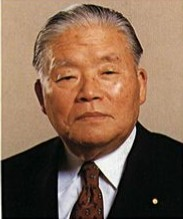

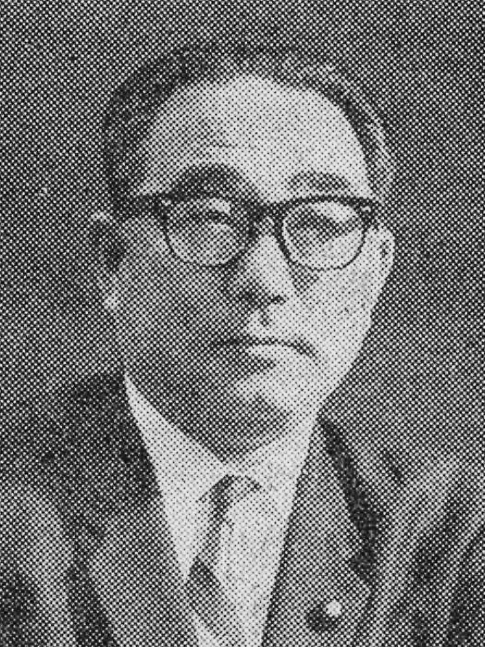

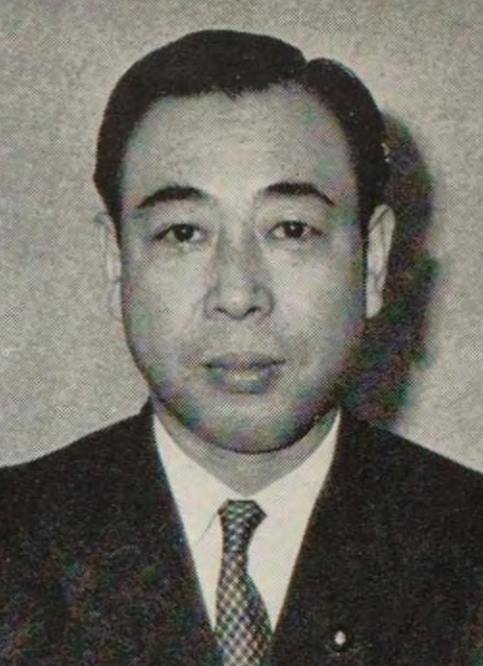

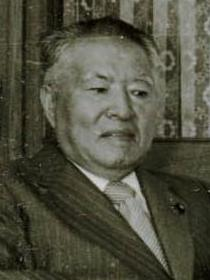

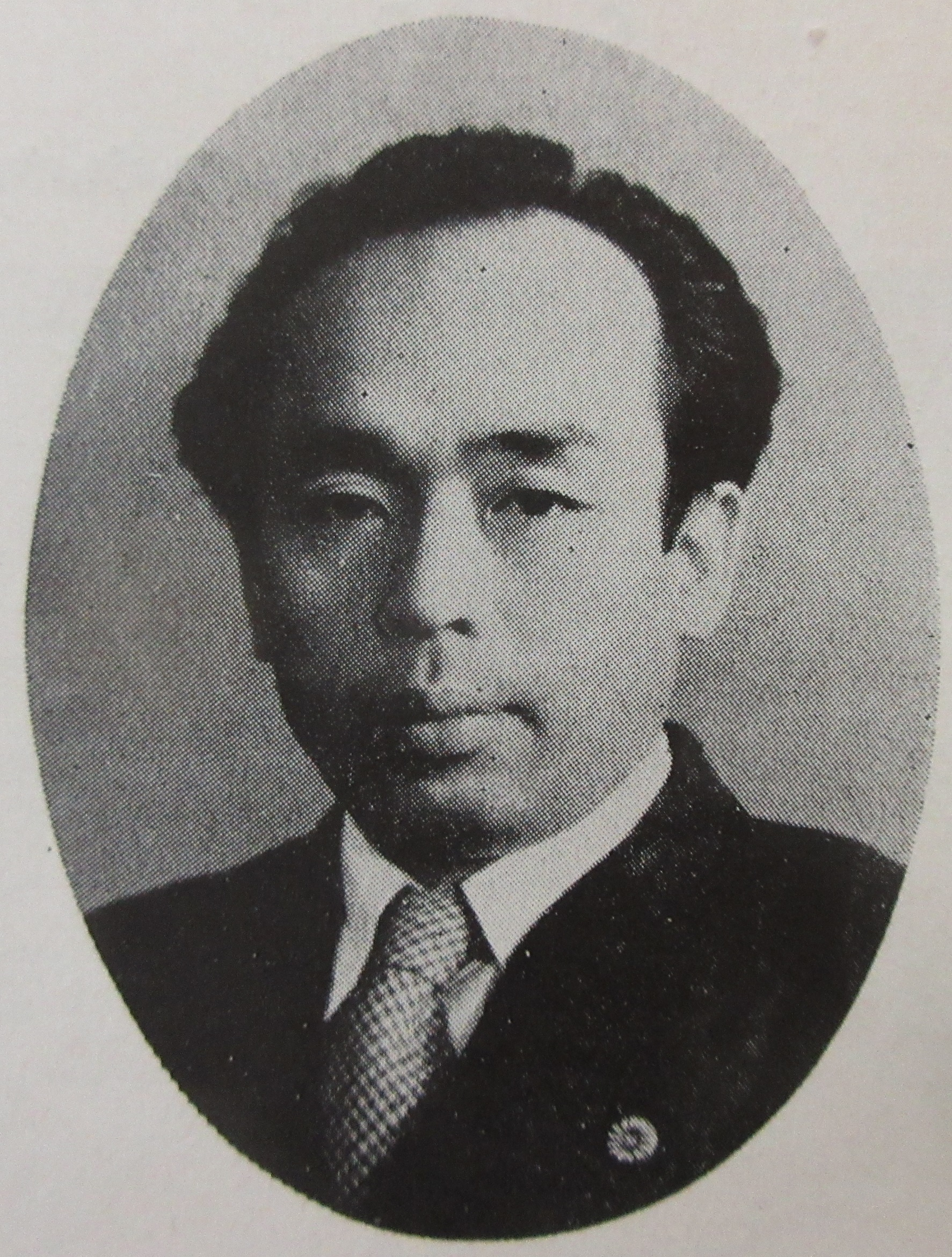

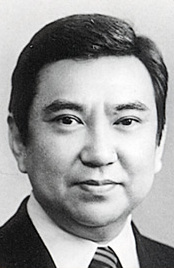
	First party	Second party	Third party
Leader	Masayoshi Ōhira (Note: Ōhira died ten days before the elections.)	Ichio Asukata	Yoshikatsu Takeiri
Party	LDP	Socialist	Kōmeitō
Last election	124 seats, 35.8%	56 seats, 17.3%	28 seats, 14.2%
Seats after	135	47	26
Seat change	▲11	▼9	▼2
Popular vote	23,778,190	7,341,828	6,669,387
Percentage	42.5%	13.1%	11.9%
Swing	▲6.7%	▼4.2%	▼2.3%
	Fourth party	Fifth party	Sixth party
Leader	Kenji Miyamoto	Kasuga Ikkō	Yōhei Kōno
Party	JCP	Democratic Socialist	New Liberal Club
Last election	16 seats, 8.4%	11 seats, 6.7%	4 seats, 3.9%
Seats after	12	11	2
Seat change	▼4	Steady	▼2
Popular vote	4,072,019	3,364,478	351,291
Percentage	7.3%	6.0%	0.6%
Swing	▼1.1%	▲0.7%	▼3.3%
- Results of the election, showing the winning candidates in each prefecture and the national block.
President of the House
of Councillors before election
Ken Yasui
LDP
Elected President of the House
of Councillors
Masatoshi Tokunaga
LDP

House of Councillors elections were held in Japan on 22 June 1980. On 16 May the Japan Socialist Party (JSP) brought no-confidence motion before the Diet relating to corruption issues, proposing more defense spending and rises in public utility charges as reasons for the House of Representatives to withdraw its backing from the government. Unexpectedly, 69 Liberal Democratic Party (LDP) members of the Diet from the Fukuda Takeo, Miki Takeo and Hidenao Nakagawa factions abstained from voting on the motion. The government was defeated by 56 votes in total of 243 and resigned. For the first time elections for both the House of Councillors and the House of Representatives were elected at the same time. In the elections of both the houses the LDP gained a majority.

== Results ==
Party	National			Constituency			Seats			
Party	Votes	%	Seats	Votes	%	Seats	Not up	Won	Total after	+/–
Liberal Democratic Party	23,778,190	42.49	21	24,533,083	43.27	48	66	69	135	+11
Japan Socialist Party	7,341,828	13.12	9	12,715,880	22.43	13	25	22	47	–9
Kōmeitō	6,669,387	11.92	9	2,817,379	4.97	3	14	12	26	–2
Japanese Communist Party	4,072,019	7.28	3	6,652,311	11.73	4	5	7	12	–4
Democratic Socialist Party	3,364,478	6.01	3	2,917,239	5.14	2	6	5	11	0
Socialist Democratic Federation	627,273	1.12	1				2	1	3	New
New Liberal Club	351,291	0.63	0	349,989	0.62	0	2	0	2	–2
Other parties	1,675,494	2.99	1	628,056	1.11	1	0	2	2	–
Independents	8,077,786	14.44	3	6,086,621	10.73	5	5	8	13	+4
Vacant						1	0	1	1	–
Total	55,957,746	100.00	50	56,700,558	100.00	77	125	127	252	0
Valid votes	55,957,746	92.80		56,700,558	94.00					
Invalid/blank votes	4,341,399	7.20		3,618,584	6.00					
Total votes	60,299,145	100.00		60,319,142	100.00					
Registered voters/turnout	80,925,034	74.51		80,925,034	74.54					
Source: Ministry of Internal Affairs and Communications, National Diet

=== By constituency ===
Constituency	Total seats	Seats won							
Constituency	Total seats	LDP	JSP	Kōmeitō	JCP	DSP	SDF	Others	Ind.
Aichi	3	1				1			1
Akita	1	1							
Aomori	1	1							
Chiba	2	1	1						
Ehime	1	1							
Fukui	1	1							
Fukuoka	3	1	1	1					
Fukushima	2	1	1						
Gifu	1	1							
Gunma	2	1	1						
Hiroshima	2	1				1			
Hokkaido	4	2	1		1				
Hyōgo	3	1	1		1				
Ibaraki	2	1	1						
Ishikawa	1	1							
Iwate	1	1							
Kagawa	1	1							
Kagoshima	2	2							
Kanagawa	2	1	1						
Kōchi	1	1							
Kumamoto	2	2							
Kyoto	2	1			1				
Mie	1	1							
Miyagi	1	1							
Miyazaki	1	1							
Nagano	2	1	1						
Nagasaki	1	1							
Nara	1	1							
Niigata	2	1	1						
Ōita	1	1							
Okinawa	1							1	
Okayama	2	1	1						
Osaka	3	1		1					1
Saga	1	1							
Saitama	2	1	1						
Shiga	1								1
Shimane	1	1							
Shizuoka	2	1	1						
Tochigi	2	2							
Tokushima	1	1							
Tokyo	4			1	1				2
Tottori	1	1							
Toyama	1	1							
Wakayama	1	1							
Yamagata	1	1							
Yamaguchi	1	1							
Yamanashi	1	1							
National	50	21	9	9	3	4	1		3
Total	126	69	22	12	7	6	1	1	8
