= New Liberal Club =

New Liberal Club 新自由クラブ Shin-jiyū-kurabu
- Leader: Yōhei Kōno
- Secretary-General: Takeo Nishioka
- Founded: June 25, 1976
- Dissolved: August 15, 1986
- Split from: Liberal Democratic Party
- Merged into: Liberal Democratic Party
- Ideology: Progressivism
- Colours: Red (official); Sky blue (customary)

New Liberal Club (新自由クラブ, Shin-jiyū-kurabu) was a political party in Japan that was founded on 25 June 1976 as a breakaway from the Liberal Democratic Party (LDP).

The New Liberal Club formed a coalition government with the LDP in December 1983, with the New Liberal's president, Seiichi Tagawa, serving as the Minister of Home Affairs in the government of Prime Minister Yasuhiro Nakasone.

It rejoined the LDP on 15 August 1986.

== Leaders of the New Liberal Club ==
No.	Name	Portrait	Term of office	
No.	Name	Portrait	Took office	Left office
1	Yōhei Kōno		June 1976	February 1979
2	Seiichi Tagawa		February 1979	June 1984
3	Yōhei Kōno		June 1984	August 1986

== Election results ==
=== House of Representatives ===
House of Representatives
Election year	Leader	Candidates	# of seats won	Change	Status
1976	Yōhei Kōno	25	17 / 511	New	Opposition
1979	Seiichi Tagawa	31	4 / 511	▼13	Opposition
1980	Seiichi Tagawa	25	12 / 511	▲8	Opposition
1983	Seiichi Tagawa	17	8 / 511	▼4	Government
1986	Yōhei Kōno	12	6 / 512	▼2	Government

=== House of Councillors ===
House of Councillors
Election year	Leader	Seats		Status
Election year	Leader	Total	Contested	Status
1977	Yōhei Kōno	3 / 252	3 / 126	Opposition
1980	Seiichi Tagawa	2 / 252	0 / 126	Opposition
1983	Seiichi Tagawa	3 / 252	2 / 126	Opposition
1986	Yōhei Kōno	1 / 252	1 / 126	Opposition
