= 1983 Japanese general election =

- 18 December 1983

All 511 seats in the House of Representatives 256 seats needed for a majority
- Turnout: 67.94% (▼6.63pp)
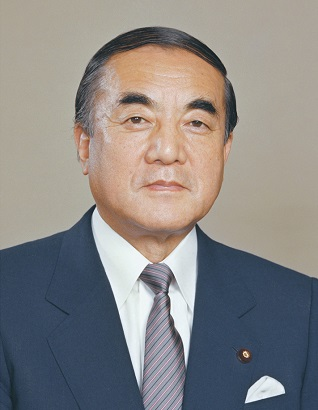

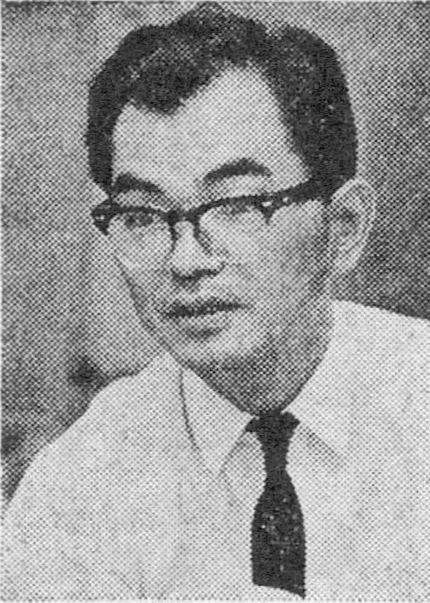

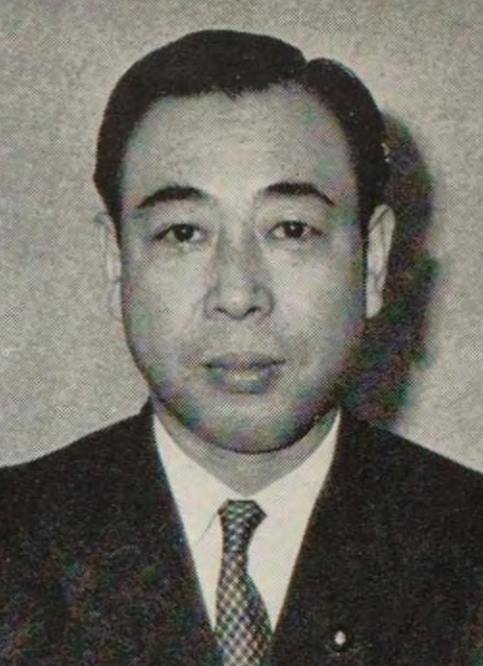

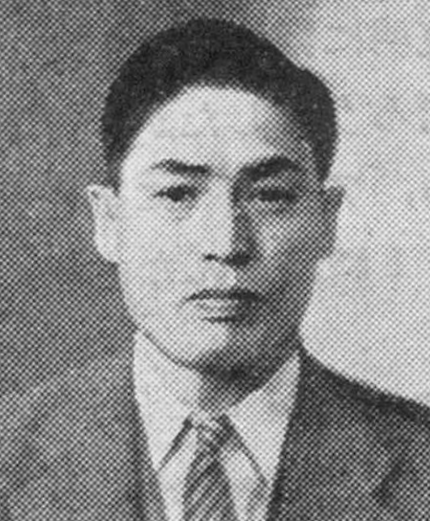

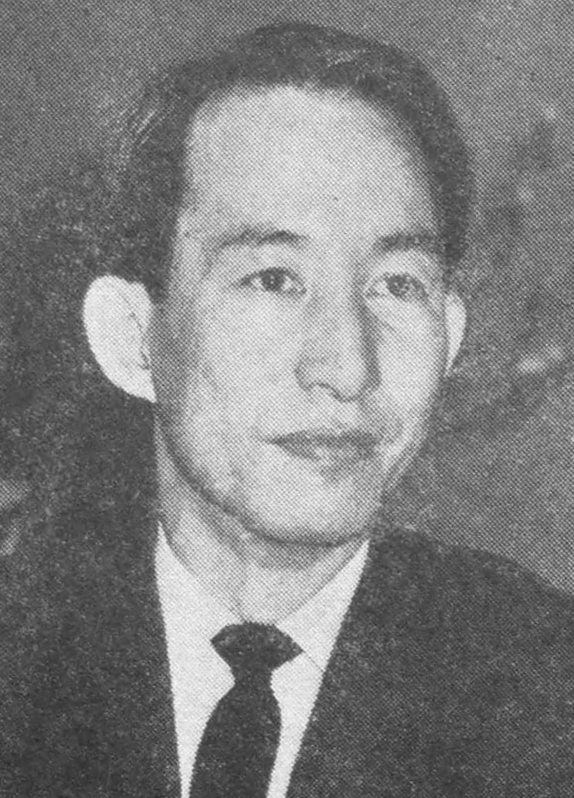
	First party	Second party	Third party
Leader	Yasuhiro Nakasone	Masashi Ishibashi	Yoshikatsu Takeiri
Party	LDP	Socialist	Kōmeitō
Last election	47.88%, 284 seats	19.31%, 107 seats	9.03%, 33 seats
Seats won	250	112	58
Seat change	▼34	▲5	▲25
Popular vote	25,982,785	11,065,082	5,745,751
Percentage	45.76%	19.49%	10.12%
Swing	▼2.12pp	▲0.18pp	▲1.09pp
	Fourth party	Fifth party	Sixth party
			New
Leader	Sasaki Ryōsaku	Tetsuzo Fuwa	Seiichi Tagawa
Party	Democratic Socialist	JCP	New Liberal Club
Last election	6.60%, 32 seats	9.83%, 29 seats	2.99%, 12 seats
Seats won	38	26	8
Seat change	▲6	▼3	▼4
Popular vote	4,129,907	5,302,485	1,341,584
Percentage	7.27%	9.34%	2.36%
Swing	▲0.67pp	▼0.49pp	▼0.63pp
	Seventh party
Leader	Hideo Den
Party	Socialist Democratic
Last election	0.68%, 3 seats
Seats won	3
Seat change	Steady
Popular vote	381,045
Percentage	0.63%
Swing	▼0.05pp
Prime Minister before election
Yasuhiro Nakasone
LDP
Elected Prime Minister
Yasuhiro Nakasone
LDP

General elections were held in Japan on 18 December 1983 to elect the 511 members of the House of Representatives. The voter turnout was 67.94%, the lowest it had ever been in post-war history up to that point, and a low which would not be surpassed until ten years later.

Contrary to pre-election polls by national daily papers which projected a comfortable majority for the LDP, the latter party lost 34 seats compared to the previous election, falling six seats short of the 256 needed for majority control. As a result, the major conservative party was forced to form a majority coalition government for the first time since 1948. In order to do so, the LDP formed a coalition with the New Liberal Club, a move which JSP leader Masashi Ishibashi called a "betrayal of the electorate."

According to Baerwald (1984), it is likely that the LDP's losses resulted in great part due to running too many candidates and thus falling prey to vote splitting. At the time, Japan used a multimember single non-transferable vote system, where a voter had a single vote in a district that elected between 3-5 representatives. This system encourages parties to run enough candidates to maximize their seat count, but not enough to spread their support too thin.

The biggest winner among the opposition was Kōmeitō, which saw an increase in terms of both seats as well as the popular vote that exceeded all of the other parties. This election also saw considerable tactical voting cooperation between the Japan Socialist Party, Komeito, Socialist Democratic Federation, and Democratic Socialist Party in various combinations, which resulted in varying levels of success for the opposition, but primarily for Komeito's outcome.

== Results ==
Party	Votes	%	Seats	+/–
Liberal Democratic Party	25,982,785	45.76	250	−34
Japan Socialist Party	11,065,083	19.49	112	+5
Kōmeitō	5,745,751	10.12	58	+25
Japanese Communist Party	5,302,485	9.34	26	−3
Democratic Socialist Party	4,129,908	7.27	38	+6
New Liberal Club	1,341,584	2.36	8	−4
Socialist Democratic Federation	381,045	0.67	3	0
Other parties	62,324	0.11	0	–
Independents	2,768,736	4.88	16	+5
Total	56,779,701	100.00	511	0
Valid votes	56,779,701	99.19		
Invalid/blank votes	461,128	0.81		
Total votes	57,240,829	100.00		
Registered voters/turnout	84,252,608	67.94		
Source: Statistics Bureau of Japan, National Diet

Seats won per district

=== By prefecture ===
Prefecture	Total seats	Seats won							
Prefecture	Total seats	LDP	JSP	Kōmeitō	DSP	JCP	NLC	SDF	Ind.
Aichi	22	9	4	2	4				3
Akita	8	4	3			1			
Aomori	7	5	1			1			
Chiba	16	9	3	3		1			
Ehime	9	6	3						
Fukui	4	2			1				1
Fukuoka	19	8	4	3	2	2			
Fukushima	12	7	3		1		1		
Gifu	9	5	2	1		1			
Gunma	10	6	3						1
Hiroshima	12	7	2	2	1				
Hokkaido	22	8	9	1	1				3
Hyōgo	20	6	5	4	3	2			
Ibaraki	12	6	3	1	1				1
Ishikawa	6	5	1						
Iwate	8	6	1		1				
Kagawa	6	5	1						
Kagoshima	11	8	3						
Kanagawa	19	3	5	4	4		3		
Kōchi	5	2	1	1		1			
Kumamoto	10	7	2	1					
Kyoto	10	4	1	2	2	1			
Mie	9	5	2	1	1				
Miyagi	9	6	2	1					
Miyazaki	6	3	2		1				
Nagano	13	8	3		1	1			
Nagasaki	9	5	2	1	1				
Nara	5	1		1	1	1			1
Niigata	15	10	4						1
Ōita	7	3	2		1				1
Okayama	10	5	2	2				1	
Okinawa	5	2	1	1		1			
Osaka	26	6	5	7	3	4	1		
Saga	5	4	1						
Saitama	15	7	2	3	1		1		1
Shiga	5	2	1		1	1			
Shimane	5	3	1			1			
Shizuoka	14	6	3	1	2				2
Tochigi	10	5	3	1	1				
Tokushima	5	3	1	1					
Tokyo	43	14	6	11	3	6	2	1	
Tottori	4	3	1						
Toyama	6	4	2						
Wakayama	6	3		1		1			1
Yamagata	8	5	2					1	
Yamaguchi	9	6	2	1					
Yamanashi	5	3	2						
Total	511	250	112	58	38	26	8	3	16
