= 1986 Japanese House of Councillors election =

- 6 July 1986

126 of the 252 seats in the House of Councillors 127 seats needed for a majority
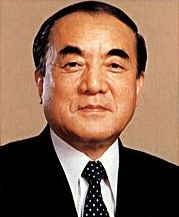

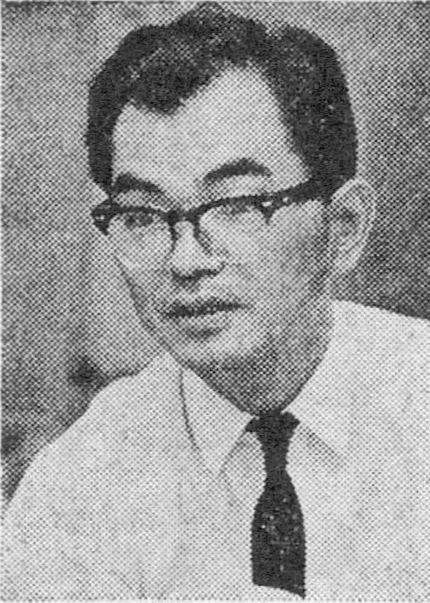

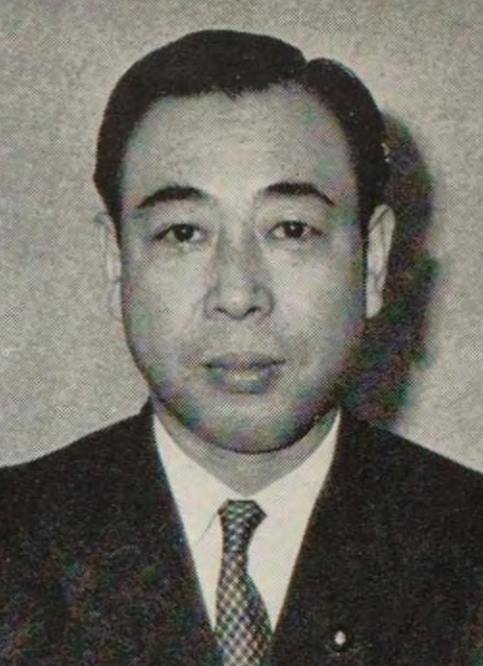

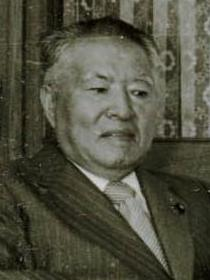
	First party	Second party	Third party
Leader	Yasuhiro Nakasone	Masashi Ishibashi	Yoshikatsu Takeiri
Party	LDP	Socialist	Kōmeitō
Last election	137 seats	44 seats	26 seats
Seats won	72	20	10
Seats after	140	41	24
Seat change	▲3	▼3	▼2
Constituency vote	26,111,258	12,464,579	2,549,037
% and swing	45.07% (▲1.83pp)	21.51% (▼2.77pp)	4.40% (▼3.43pp)
National vote	22,132,573	9,869,088	7,438,501
% and swing	38.58% (▲3.25pp)	17.20% (▲0.89pp)	12.97% (▼2.75pp)
	Fourth party	Fifth party
Leader	Kenji Miyamoto	Tsukamoto Saburō
Party	JCP	Democratic Socialist
Last election	14 seats	11 seats
Seats won	9	5
Seats after	16	12
Seat change	▲2	▲1
Constituency vote	6,617,487	2,643,370
% and swing	11.42% (▲0.90pp)	4.56% (▼1.15pp)
National vote	5,430,838	3,940,325
% and swing	9.47% (▲0.52pp)	6.87% (▼1.49pp)
- Results of the election, showing the winning candidates in each prefecture and the national PR block.
President of the House
of Councillors before election
Matsuo Kimura
LDP
Elected President of the House
of Councillors
Masaaki Fujita
LDP

House of Councillors elections were held in Japan on 6 July 1986 to elect half the seats in the upper house of the Diet. The elections were held alongside elections for the House of Representatives, the second and most recent such instance since 1980.

== Results ==
Party	National			Constituency			Seats			
Party	Votes	%	Seats	Votes	%	Seats	Not up	Won	Total after	+/–
Liberal Democratic Party	22,132,573	38.58	22	26,111,258	45.07	50	68	72	140	+3
Japan Socialist Party	9,869,088	17.20	9	12,464,579	21.51	11	21	20	41	–3
Kōmeitō	7,438,501	12.97	7	2,549,037	4.40	3	14	10	24	–2
Japanese Communist Party	5,430,838	9.47	5	6,617,487	11.42	4	7	9	16	+2
Democratic Socialist Party	3,940,325	6.87	3	2,643,370	4.56	2	7	5	12	+1
Tax Affairs Party	1,803,051	3.14	1	327,444	0.57	0	1	1	2	New
New Party for Salaried Men	1,759,484	3.07	1				2	1	3	+1
Dainiin Club	1,455,532	2.54	1				2	1	3	+1
New Liberal Club	1,367,291	2.38	1				1	1	2	0
Other parties	2,166,059	3.78	0	1,192,801	2.06	0	1	0	1	–
Independents				6,032,259	10.41	6	1	6	7	+1
Vacant						1	0	1	1	–
Total	57,362,742	100.00	50	57,938,235	100.00	77	125	127	252	0
Valid votes	57,362,742	93.06		57,938,235	93.94					
Invalid/blank votes	4,280,530	6.94		3,735,135	6.06					
Total votes	61,643,272	100.00		61,673,370	100.00					
Registered voters/turnout	86,426,845	71.32		86,426,845	71.36					
Source: Ministry of Internal Affairs and Communications, National Diet

=== By constituency ===
Constituency	Total seats	Seats won									
Constituency	Total seats	LDP	JSP	Kōmeitō	JCP	DSP	TAP	NPSM	DC	NLC	Ind.
Aichi	3	1				1					1
Akita	1	1									
Aomori	1										1
Chiba	2	1	1								
Ehime	1	1									
Fukui	1	1									
Fukuoka	3	2	1								
Fukushima	2	1	1								
Gifu	1	1									
Gunma	2	2									
Hiroshima	2	1				1					
Hokkaido	4	2	1		1						
Hyōgo	3	1	1	1							
Ibaraki	2	1	1								
Ishikawa	1	1									
Iwate	1	1									
Kagawa	1	1									
Kagoshima	2	2									
Kanagawa	2	1	1								
Kōchi	1	1									
Kumamoto	2	2									
Kyoto	2	1			1						
Mie	1	1									
Miyagi	1	1									
Miyazaki	1										1
Nagano	2	1	1								
Nagasaki	1	1									
Nara	1	1									
Niigata	2	1	1								
Ōita	1	1									
Okinawa	1	1									
Okayama	2	1									1
Osaka	3			1	1						1
Saga	1	1									
Saitama	2	1	1								
Shiga	1										1
Shimane	1	1									
Shizuoka	2	1	1								
Tochigi	2	2									
Tokushima	1	1									
Tokyo	4	2		1	1						
Tottori	1	1									
Toyama	1	1									
Wakayama	1	1									
Yamagata	1	1									
Yamaguchi	1	1									
Yamanashi	1	1									
National	50	22	9	7	5	3	1	1	1	1	
Total	126	72	20	10	9	5	1	1	1	1	6
