= Seiichi Tagawa =

Japanese politician (1918–2009)

- 田川 誠一

Leader of the Progressive Party
- In office 22 January 1987 – 2 August 1993
- Preceded by: Position established
- Succeeded by: Position abolished

Minister of Home Affairs
- In office 27 December 1983 – 1 November 1984
- Prime Minister: Yasuhiro Nakasone
- Preceded by: Sachio Yamamoto
- Succeeded by: Toru Furuya

Leader of the New Liberal Club
- In office February 1979 – June 1984
- Preceded by: Yōhei Kōno
- Succeeded by: Yōhei Kōno

Member of the House of Representatives
- In office 21 November 1960 – 18 June 1993
- Preceded by: Naosaku Doi
- Succeeded by: Eiji Nagai
- Constituency: Kanagawa 2nd

Personal details
- Born: 4 June 1918 Yokosuka, Kanagawa, Japan
- Died: 7 August 2009 (aged 91) Yokosuka, Kanagawa, Japan
- Party: Progressive (1987–1993)
- Other political affiliations: LDP (1960–1976); NLC (1976–1986); Independent (1986–1987)
- Relatives: Yōhei Kōno (cousin)
- Education: Keio University

Seiichi Tagawa (田川 誠一, Tagawa Seiichi; 4 June 1918 – 7 August 2009) was a Japanese politician who co-founded the now defunct New Liberal Club in 1976, and served as its president from 1979 until 1984.

Tagawa graduated from Keio University with a B.L. in December 1941. After that, he worked in the Imperial Japanese Army and The Asahi Shimbun Company.

Tagawa was first elected to the House of Representatives of Japan in 1960. He would ultimately be re-elected to the House in eleven elections.

Tagawa and a group of other lawmakers, including Yōhei Kōno, broke away from the ruling Liberal Democratic Party (LDP) in 1976. Tagawa, Yohei and the others founded the New Liberal Club political party on 25 June 1976.

The New Liberal Club formed a coalition government with the LDP in December 1983. Tagawa became the Minister of Home Affairs within the government of Prime Minister Yasuhiro Nakasone as part of the coalition agreement.

The New Liberal Club was disbanded in 1986 and rejoined the LDP on 15 August 1986. Following the disbanding of the New Liberal Club, Tagawa went on to found a second political party, the short-lived and now defunct Progressive Party.

Tagawa spent the rest of his career campaigning against political corruption. He retired from politics in 1993.

Seiichi Tagawa died from complications of old age at a nursing home in Yokosuka, Kanagawa Prefecture, on 7 August 2009, at the age of 91.

Tagawa's cousin, Yōhei Kōno, served as the Speaker of the House of Representatives of Japan until the House was dissolved in July 2009 in preparation for the 2009 general election.

Political offices
Preceded by Sachio Yamamoto	Minister of Home Affairs; 1983–1984	Succeeded by Toru Furuya
Preceded by Sachio Yamamoto	Chairman of the National Public Safety Commission; 1983–1984	Succeeded by Toru Furuya
House of Representatives (Japan)
Preceded by Tatsuo Ozawa	Chair, Social and Labour Affairs Committee of the House of Representatives of Japan; 1972–1973	Succeeded by Masakatsu Nohara
Party political offices
Preceded by Takeo Nishioka	Secretary General of the New Liberal Club; 1979–1980	Succeeded by Toshio Yamaguchi
Preceded by Yōhei Kōno	Representative for the New Liberal Club; 1980–1984	Succeeded by Yōhei Kōno
Preceded by Party established	Representative for the Progressive Party (Shinshinto); 1987–1993	Succeeded by Party dissolved
