= Yōhei Kōno =

Japanese politician (1937–2026)

- 河野 洋平
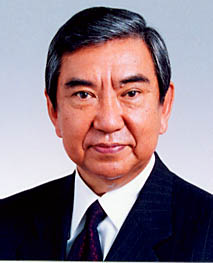
- Official portrait, 1999

Speaker of the House of Representatives
- In office 19 November 2003 – 21 July 2009
- Monarch: Akihito
- Deputy: Kansei Nakano; Takahiro Yokomichi
- Preceded by: Tamisuke Watanuki
- Succeeded by: Takahiro Yokomichi

Deputy Prime Minister of Japan
- In office 30 June 1994 – 2 October 1995
- Prime Minister: Tomiichi Murayama
- Preceded by: Tsutomu Hata
- Succeeded by: Ryutaro Hashimoto

President of the Liberal Democratic Party
- In office 9 August 1993 – 2 October 1995
- Vice President: Keizō Obuchi
- Secretary-General: Yoshirō Mori; Hiroshi Mitsuzuka
- Preceded by: Kiichi Miyazawa
- Succeeded by: Ryutaro Hashimoto
Ministerial offices
Minister of Foreign Affairs
In office 5 October 1999 – 26 April 2001
Prime Minister	Keizo Obuchi; Yoshiro Mori
Preceded by	Masahiko Kōmura
Succeeded by	Makiko Tanaka
In office 30 June 1994 – 11 January 1996
Prime Minister	Tomiichi Murayama
Preceded by	Koji Kakizawa
Succeeded by	Yukihiko Ikeda
Chief Cabinet Secretary
In office 12 December 1992 – 9 August 1993
Prime Minister	Kiichi Miyazawa
Preceded by	Koichi Kato
Succeeded by	Masayoshi Takemura
Director-General of the Science and Technology Agency
In office 28 December 1985 – 22 July 1986
Prime Minister	Yasuhiro Nakasone
Preceded by	Reiichi Takeuchi
Succeeded by	Yataro Mitsubayashi

Member of the House of Representatives; from Kanagawa
- In office 29 January 1967 – 21 July 2009
- Preceded by: Ichirō Kōno
- Succeeded by: Yōsuke Kamiyama
- Constituency: 3rd district (1967–1976); 5th district (1976–1996); 17th district (1996–2009)

Personal details
- Born: 15 January 1937 Hiratsuka, Kanagawa, Japan
- Died: 8 June 2026 (aged 89)
- Party: Liberal Democratic (before 1976; 1986–2026)
- Other political affiliations: New Liberal Club (1976–1986)
- Children: Taro Kono
- Parent: Ichirō Kōno (father)
- Relatives: Kenzō Kōno (uncle); Seiichi Tagawa (cousin)
- Education: Waseda University

Yōhei Kōno (河野 洋平, Kōno Yōhei; 15 January 1937 – 8 June 2026) was a Japanese politician who was President of the Liberal Democratic Party. He served as Speaker of the House of Representatives from November 2003 until August 2009, when the LDP lost its majority in the 2009 election. Kōno served as speaker for the longest length since the set up of House of Representatives in 1890.

Kōno was the president of the Japan Association of Athletics Federations from 1999 to 2013.

== Early life and education ==
Kōno was born in Hiratsuka, Kanagawa on 15 January 1937, the eldest son of politician Ichirō Kōno. His father served as deputy prime minister and was in charge of the 1964 Tokyo Olympics. His younger uncle Kenzō Kōno served as the president of the House of Councillors from 1971 to 1977. Ichiro Kono owned racehorses, an endeavor that followed Yohei Kono as an adult.

After graduating from Waseda University Senior High School, he studied Economics at Waseda University and later attended Stanford University. Kōno was more interested in working for private business rather than politics and after his schooling was completed, he worked for the Marubeni company. When his father died in 1965, his father's supporters pressured him to take his father's place in the House of Representatives which he did in 1967.

== Political career ==
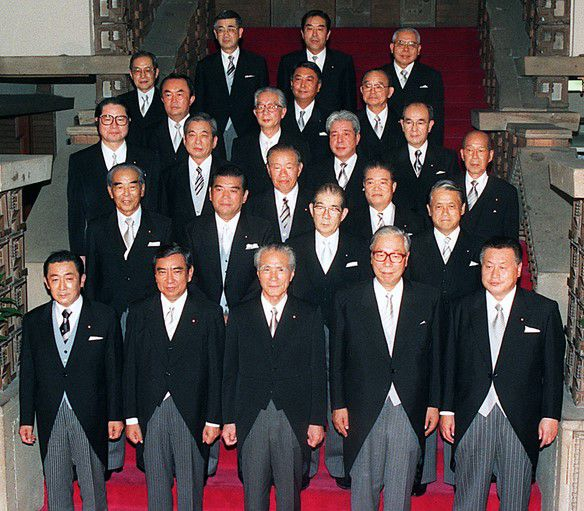
Kono with members of Murayama Reshuffled Cabinet (at the Prime Minister's Official Residence on 8 August 1995). Despite Murayama served as Prime Minister, Kono as leader of the LDP led the Cabinet.

He was Deputy Prime Minister of Japan from 1994 to 1995 which he had strong influence in the Murayama Cabinet. He was Minister of Foreign Affairs under Prime Minister Tomiichi Murayama and Yoshirō Mori (1993-1995, 1999-2001). He was a member of the Liberal Democratic Party (LDP). He was once President of the LDP from 1993 to 1995, and to date is one of two LDP leaders, along with Sadakazu Tanigaki, to have never served as Prime Minister of Japan. As he was one of the pro-China faction of the LDP, he came under pressure domestically in the spring of 2005 when anti-Japanese movements in China became intense due to then Prime Minister Junichiro Koizumi visiting the Yasukuni Shrine which he opposed the visit to.

Kōno was known for his acknowledgement of comfort women. During his tenure as Chief Cabinet Secretary, in a speech titled the official statement he made in 1993, made after historian Yoshiaki Yoshimi announced he had discovered in the Defense Agency library in Tokyo documentary evidence that the Imperial Japanese Army established and ran comfort stations, he admitted that the Japanese Imperial Army had been involved, directly and indirectly, in the establishment of comfort stations, and that coercion had been used in the recruitment and retention of the women. His subsequent call for historical research and education aimed at remembering the issue became the basis for addressing the subject of forced prostitution in school history textbooks.

== Personal life ==
While attending Stanford, Kōno was summoned home by his father and introduced to Takeko Ito, the daughter of a Japanese businessman. The two married and had a son, Taro Kono who later followed his father into politics. Takeko died of cancer at the age of 53. After her death, Kōno said, "The fact I caused her more hardship than most people as the wife of a politician, and that this shortened her life, is a source of deep regret that I can never fully come to terms with."

Kōno died in June 2026, at the age of 89.

== Footnotes ==
Party political offices
Position established	President of the New Liberal Club; 1976–1979	Succeeded by Seiichi Tagawa
Preceded by Seiichi Tagawa	President of the New Liberal Club; 1984–1986	Position abolished
Preceded by Kiichi Miyazawa	President of the Liberal Democratic Party; 1993–1995	Succeeded by Ryutaro Hashimoto
Political offices
Preceded by Reiichi Takeuchi	Director General of the Science and Technology Agency; 1985–1986	Succeeded by Yataro Mitsubayashi
Preceded by Reiichi Takeuchi	Chairman of the Japanese Atomic Energy Commission; 1985–1986	Succeeded by Yataro Mitsubayashi
Preceded by Koichi Kato	Chief Cabinet Secretary; 1992–1993	Succeeded by Masayoshi Takemura
Preceded by Koji Kakizawa	Minister of Foreign Affairs; 1994–1996	Succeeded by Yukihiko Ikeda
Preceded by Tsutomu Hata	Deputy Prime Minister of Japan; 1994–1995	Succeeded by Ryutaro Hashimoto
Preceded by Masahiko Kōmura	Minister of Foreign Affairs; 1999–2001	Succeeded by Makiko Tanaka
Preceded by Tamisuke Watanuki	Speaker of the Japanese House of Representatives; 2003–2009	Succeeded by Takahiro Yokomichi
Sporting positions
Preceded by Hanji Aoki	President of the Japan Association of Athletics Federations; 1999–2013	Succeeded by Hiroshi Yokokawa
