= Yasuhiro Nakasone =

Prime Minister of Japan from 1982 to 1987

Junior First Rank Yasuhiro Nakasone
- 中曽根 康弘
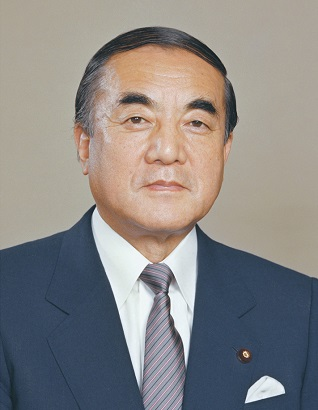
- Official portrait, 1982

Prime Minister of Japan
- In office 27 November 1982 – 6 November 1987
- Monarch: Shōwa
- Deputy: Shin Kanemaru
- Preceded by: Zenkō Suzuki
- Succeeded by: Noboru Takeshita

President of the Liberal Democratic Party
- In office 25 November 1982 – 31 October 1987
- Vice President: Susumu Nikaidō
- Secretary-General: Susumu Nikaidō; Rokusuke Tanaka; Shin Kanemaru; Noboru Takeshita
- Preceded by: Zenkō Suzuki
- Succeeded by: Noboru Takeshita
Ministerial offices
Director-General of the Administrative Management Agency
In office 17 July 1980 – 27 November 1982
Prime Minister	Zenkō Suzuki
Preceded by	Sōsuke Uno
Succeeded by	Kunikichi Saitō
Minister of International Trade and Industry
In office 7 July 1972 – 9 December 1974
Prime Minister	Kakuei Tanaka
Preceded by	Kakuei Tanaka
Succeeded by	Toshio Kōmoto
Director-General of the Science and Technology Agency
In office 7 July 1972 – 22 December 1972
Prime Minister	Kakuei Tanaka
Preceded by	Shirō Kiuchi
Succeeded by	Kazuo Maeda
In office 18 June 1959 – 19 July 1960
Prime Minister	Nobusuke Kishi
Preceded by	Tatsunosuke Takasaki
Succeeded by	Masuo Araki
Director-General of the Defense Agency
In office 14 January 1970 – 5 July 1971
Prime Minister	Eisaku Satō
Preceded by	Kiichi Arita
Succeeded by	Keikichi Masuhara
Minister of Transport
In office 25 November 1967 – 30 November 1968
Prime Minister	Eisaku Satō
Preceded by	Takeo Oohashi
Succeeded by	Ken Harada
Party political offices
Secretary-General of the Liberal Democratic Party
In office December 1974 – September 1976
President	Takeo Miki
Vice President	Etsusaburo Shiina
Preceded by	Susumu Nikaidō
Succeeded by	Tsuneo Uchida

Member of the House of Representatives; from Northern Kanto
- In office 25 April 1947 – 10 October 2003
- Preceded by: Constituency established
- Succeeded by: Multi-member district
- Constituency: Gunma 3rd (1947–1996); PR block (1996–2003)

Personal details
- Born: 27 May 1918 Takasaki, Gunma, Japan
- Died: 29 November 2019 (aged 101) Tokyo, Japan
- Party: Liberal Democratic (after 1955)
- Other political affiliations: DP (1947–1950); NDP (1950–1952); Kaishintō (1952–1954); JDP (1954–1955)
- Spouse: Tsutako Kobayashi (m. 1945; died 2012)
- Children: Hirofumi Nakasone
- Relatives: Yasutaka Nakasone (grandson)
- Education: Tokyo Imperial University
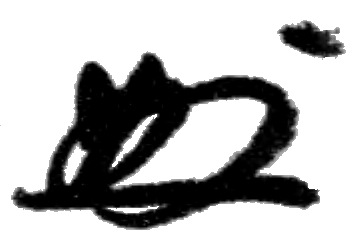
- Signature

Military service
- Allegiance: Empire of Japan
- Branch/service: Imperial Japanese Navy
- Years of service: 1941–1945
- Rank: Lieutenant-commander (as Naval Paymaster)
- Battles/wars: World War II
- Yasuhiro Nakasone's voice Nakasone on Japan–United States relations Recorded 2 January 1985

Yasuhiro Nakasone (中曽根 康弘, Nakasone Yasuhiro; 27 May 1918 – 29 November 2019) was a Japanese politician who served as Prime Minister of Japan from 1982 to 1987. His political term was best known for pushing through the privatization of state-owned companies, pursuing a hawkish and pro-United States foreign policy and his support of neoliberalism.

Born in Gunma Prefecture, Nakasone graduated from Tokyo Imperial University and served in the imperial navy during the Pacific War. After the war, he entered the National Diet in 1947 and rose through the ranks of the Liberal Democratic Party, serving as chief of the Defense Agency from 1970 to 1971 under Eisaku Satō, international trade and industry minister from 1972 to 1974 under Kakuei Tanaka, and administration minister from 1980 to 1982 under Zenkō Suzuki. As prime minister, he passed large defense budgets and controversially visited the Yasukuni Shrine. A conservative contemporary of U.S. president Ronald Reagan, Nakasone privatized the Japanese National Railways and telephone systems, and favored closer ties with the U.S., once calling Japan an "unsinkable aircraft carrier". After leaving office in 1987, he was implicated in the Recruit scandal, causing the influence of his LDP faction to wane before he retired from the Diet in 2003.

== Early life ==
=== Family background ===
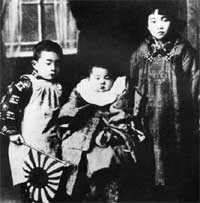
One-year-old Nakasone (1919)

Nakasone was born in Takasaki in Gunma, a prefecture northwest of Tokyo, on 27 May 1918. He was the second son of Nakasone Matsugoro II, a lumber dealer, and Nakamura Yuku. He had five siblings: an elder brother named Kichitaro, an elder sister named Shoko, a younger brother named Ryosuke and another younger brother and younger sister who both died in childhood. The Nakasone family had been of the samurai class during the Edo period, and claimed direct descent from the Minamoto clan through the famous Minamoto no Yoshimitsu and through his son Minamoto no Yoshikiyo (d. 1149). According to family records, Tsunayoshi (k. 1417), a vassal of the Takeda clan and a tenth-generation descendant of Yoshikiyo, took the name of Nakasone Juro and was killed at the Battle of Sagamigawa. In about 1590, the samurai Nakasone Sōemon Mitsunaga settled in the town of Satomimura in Kōzuke Province. His descendants became silk merchants and pawnbrokers. Nakasone's father, originally born Nakasone Kanichi, settled in Takasaki in 1912 and established a timber business and lumberyard which had success as a result of the post-WWI building boom.

=== Education, bureaucratic career and war ===
Nakasone described his early childhood and youth as a happy one, and himself as a "quiet, easy-going child" nicknamed "Yat-chan". He attended a local primary school in Takasaki and was a poor student until the fourth grade, after which he excelled and was at the top of his class. He entered Shizuoka Higher School in 1935, where he excelled in history and literature, and learned to speak fluent French.

In the autumn of 1938, Nakasone entered the Faculty of Law of the Imperial University of Tokyo. During his time at the university, he was strongly influenced by Teiji Yabe, whose lectures on politics fascinated him. He also developed the belief that personality should not be used as a means to achieve something, which contributed to his strong anti-communist and anti-Nazi views. On the night of 10 March 1940, he received a phone call from his father telling him that his mother in Takasaki had fallen seriously ill. By the time he arrived in Takasaki on the first train the next morning, she had already passed away. The fact that his mother had not told him about her illness, so as not to distract him from his studies, became an impetus for him to work harder. He passed the high-level bureaucrat recruitment examination. He began working for the Home Ministry, which was as prestigious as the Ministry of Finance due to its extensive authority.

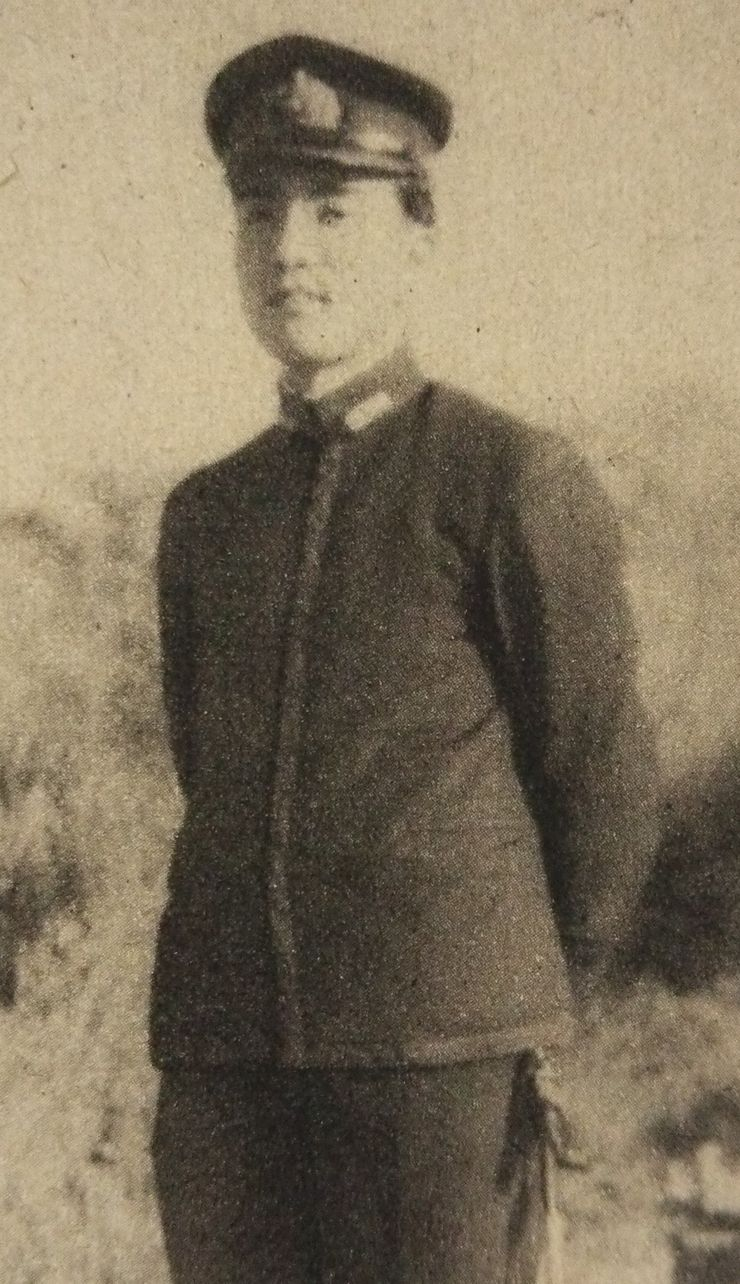
Nakasone in the Imperial Japanese Navy

Nakasone applied for the Navy's programme that allowed graduates from elite universities to serve as officers for two years without rising through the ranks. After completing a training period at the Navy Paymaster's School in Tsukiji, he became a lieutenant. With 2,000 staff under his command, ranging from young doctors and scholars to elderly ex-convicts, Nakasone departed the naval base at Kure on 29 November 1941 on a mission to build airfields. Aboard his ship, he struggled to issue effective orders to his staff and ultimately selected an ex-yakuza with eight convictions as his assistant to relay his commands. In January 1942, he arrived at Balikpapan in Dutch East Indies, where his unit was raided by a retreating Dutch cruiser. On the beach, he cremated the first 23 casualties among his staff, including his ex-yakuza assistant. This experience left a deep and lasting impression, which profoundly influenced his political beliefs. There, he realized that the construction of the airfield had been stalled due to the prevalence of sexual crimes, gambling, and other problems among his men, so he gathered comfort women and organized a brothel called "comfort station" as a solution. He managed to procure four Indonesian women, and a Navy report praised him for having “mitigated the mood of his troops". Nakasone married Tsutako Kobayashi, the daughter of geologist Giichiro Kobayashi, on 11 February 1945. A fortnight later, he lost his younger brother, Ryosuke, in an air accident.

Upon returning to Tokyo after the end of the Second World War, he resumed his suspended career at the Home Ministry. He observed the growing prevalence of communism among the Japanese people, but the Civil Service was largely powerless to address it under the absolute authority of the Allied Occupation Forces. While supervising the police force in Kagawa Prefecture, he decided to abandon his bureaucratic career and stand in the upcoming general election. He later wrote of his return to Tokyo in August 1945 after Japan's surrender: "I stood vacantly amid the ruins of Tokyo, after discarding my officer's short sword and removing the epaulettes of my uniform. As I looked around me, I swore to resurrect my homeland from the ashes of defeat".

== Early parliamentary career ==
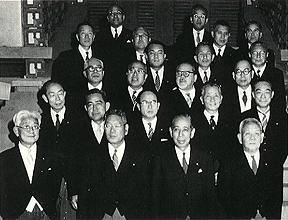
Nakasone's first cabinet role was as Minister of Science and Technology in the reshuffled Second Kishi Cabinet in 1959. He can be seen at the centre of the fourth row from the front.

He stood in the 1949 general election as a Democratic Party candidate. He campaigned on a nationalist platform, arguing for an enlarged Self-Defence Force, to amend Article 9 of the Japanese Constitution (which outlawed war as a means to settling international disputes), and to revive Japanese patriotism, especially in reverence for the Emperor. He entered the Japanese Diet as a member of the House of Representatives for the Democratic Party. "As a freshman lawmaker in 1951, he delivered a 28-page letter to General MacArthur criticising the occupation, a brazen move. The General angrily threw the letter in [the] bin, Yasuhiro was later told. This stand established [Yasuhiro Nakasone's] credentials as a right-wing politician." He gained brief notoriety in 1952 for blaming Emperor Hirohito for Japan's defeat in the war. In 1955, at Nakasone's urging, the government granted the equivalent of $14,000,000 to the Agency for Industrial Science and Technology to begin nuclear power research. Nakasone rose through the LDP's ranks, becoming Minister of Science in 1959 under the government of Nobusuke Kishi, then Minister of Transport in 1967, Director General of the Japan Defense Agency from 1970 to 1971, Minister of International Trade and Industry in 1972 and Minister of Administration in 1981.

As the head of the Self-Defence Force, Nakasone argued for an increase in defence spending from less than 1% GNP to 3% of GNP. He was also in favour of Japan having tactical nuclear weapons. He was labelled "the weathervane" in 1972 because he switched his support from Takeo Fukuda to Kakuei Tanaka in the leadership election, ensuring Tanaka's victory. In turn, Tanaka would give his powerful support to Nakasone against Fukuda a decade later in the fight for the premiership.

== Premiership (1982–1987) ==
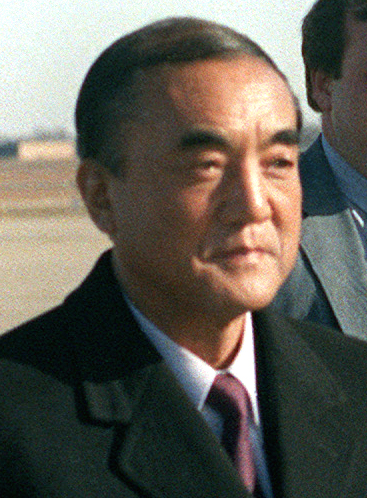
- Nakasone in 1983
- Premiership of Yasuhiro Nakasone; 27 November 1982 – 6 November 1987
- Monarch: Emperor Shōwa
- Cabinet: First Nakasone Cabinet; Second Nakasone Cabinet; Third Nakasone Cabinet
- Party: Liberal Democratic
- Election: 1983; 1986
- Seat: Naikaku Sōri Daijin Kantei
- Constituency: Gunma 3rd
- Emblem of the Government of Japan

In 1982, Nakasone became prime minister. Along with Minister of Foreign Affairs Shintaro Abe, Nakasone improved Japanese relations with the USSR and the People's Republic of China. Nakasone was best known for his close relationship with U.S. President Ronald Reagan, popularly called the "Ron-Yasu" friendship. Nakasone sought a more equal relationship with the United States, and said: "President Reagan is the pitcher and I'm the catcher. When the pitcher gives the signs, I'll co-operate unsparingly, but if he doesn't sometimes follow the catcher's signs, the game can't be won". Nakasone said Japan would be "America's unsinkable aircraft carrier" in the Pacific and that Japan would "keep complete control of the four straits that go through to Japanese islands, to prevent the passage of Soviet submarines". He was attacked by political opponents as a reactionary and a "dangerous militarist". Nakasone responded by saying: "A nation must shed any sense of ignominy and move forward seeking glory". However his attempt to amend Article 9 failed.

In 1984, Nakasone visited China on the twelfth anniversary of Japan's diplomatic recognition of the People's Republic, for which the Chinese government arranged tours of China for 3,000 Japanese youths. On the trip, Nakasone's son was privately accompanied by the daughter of Hu Yaobang, the-then General Secretary of the Chinese Communist Party. After the event, Hu was criticised by other members of the Chinese Communist Party for the extravagance and warmth of the event. Nakasone also visited President Corazon Aquino in a series of talks between the Philippines and Japan during a special state visit from 1986 to 1987, to provide good economic and trade relations.

In economic affairs, Nakasone's most notable policy was his privatisation initiative, which led to the breakup of Japan National Railways into the modern Japan Railways Group (JR). This led to 80,000 redundancies, unheard of in Japan until that point. He also privatized Nippon Telegraph and Telephone Public Corporation and Japan Tobacco and Salt Public Corporation to create Nippon Telegraph and Telephone Corporation (NTT) and Japan Tobacco Inc. (JT). The privatization of the three public corporations reduced the number of employees and significantly improved ordinary income per employee, productivity, and sales. According to a report by Japan Institute for Labour Policy and Training, 20 years after the privatization of NTT and JT and 16 years after the privatization of JR, the number of employees was reduced to 35% for JT, 65% for NTT and 70% for JR. In addition, NTT, JT and JR increased their ordinary income by 8 times, 5.5 times and 3 times, respectively. The productivity of NTT, JT and JR increased 3 times, 2.5 times and 1.5 times, respectively. Sales at NTT and JR increased 2.2 times and 1.2 times, respectively. Nakasone wrote of his economic reforms:

I was carrying out a kind of "improvement" of Japan's structure. For 110 years, ever since the Meiji restoration, Japan had been striving to catch up with America and Britain. In the 1970s we did catch up. Beyond that point the [state's] regulations only stand in the way of the growth of the economy. If government officials have too much power, the private sector of the economy will not grow. We had to change the system.

For the first time in Japan's post-war history, bureaucrats lost their leading role. In 1985, Nakasone appointed the former Governor of the Bank of Japan, Haruo Maekawa, to head a commission on Japan's economic future. In 1986, the Commission recommended that Japan should grow not through exports (which were angering Japan's trading partners) but from within. Nakasone advised the Japanese public to purchase foreign imports; in a well-publicised shopping trip, he bought an American tennis racket, an Italian tie and a French shirt. He said: "Japan is like a mah-jong player who always wins. Sooner or later the other players will decide that they do not want to play with him". The Japanese public were skeptical but the Commission created a good impression abroad, especially in America, where the Under Secretary of State for Economic Affairs W. Allen Wallis called it a watershed in Japan's post-war economic policy.

Nakasone also became known for having a nationalist attitude and for wanting to stimulate ethnic pride amongst the Japanese. He was an adherent to the nihonjinron theory that claims Japan is incomparably different from the rest of the world. Influenced by Japanese philosopher Tetsuro Watsuji, Nakasone believed that Japan's "monsoon culture" inspired a special Japanese compassion, unlike the desert culture of the Middle East that produced the Judeo-Christian "An eye for an eye, a tooth for a tooth". In a speech in 1986, Nakasone said it was Japan's international mission to spread the monsoon culture abroad.

On 15 August 1985, the fortieth anniversary of Japan's surrender, Nakasone and his Cabinet visited the Yasukuni Shrine, where Japan's war casualties - including convicted war criminals - were buried, in full mourning dress. This had great symbolic significance as he visited the shrine in his official capacity, intending to reassert the Japanese government's respect for the spirits of the ancestors killed in battle, including those who died in World War II. This turned out however to be a controversial move which was heavily criticised by the Chinese Government (including in its newspaper, People's Daily) and led to angry demonstrations in Beijing. It was also attacked by opponents at home for violating the Constitution's separation of religion and state. Nakasone defended his actions by saying, "The true defence of Japan ... becomes possible only through the combination of liberty-loving peoples who are equal to each other ... The manner is desired to be based on self-determination of the race". He also said, "It is considered progressive to criticise pre-war Japan for its faults and defects, but I firmly oppose such a notion. A nation is still a nation whether it wins or loses a war".

Nakasone also sought educational reform, setting up a commission. Its report recommended that "a spirit of patriotism" should be inculcated in children, along with respect for elders and authority. This was not fully implemented and came under attack from the teachers' trade union. The commission also recommended that the national anthem should be taught and that the Rising Sun Flag should also be raised during entrance and graduation ceremonies. History textbooks were also reformed. In 1986, Nakasone dismissed his Education Minister, Masayuki Fujio, after he justified Japan's annexation of Korea in 1910.

Nakasone aroused controversy in September 1986 when he claimed that Americans were, on average, less intelligent than Japanese because "the US has many immigrants, Puerto Ricans, Mexicans, and Blacks, who bring the average level down" and also said that "in America today there are still many Blacks who can't even read." He then clarified his comments, stating that he meant to congratulate the U.S. on its economic success despite the presence of "problematic" minorities. Ainu people living in Japan criticized this comment as ignoring the reality of racial discrimination against them.

In 1987, he was forced to resign after he attempted to introduce a value added tax to reduce the burden of direct taxes in a policy designed to cut the budget deficit.

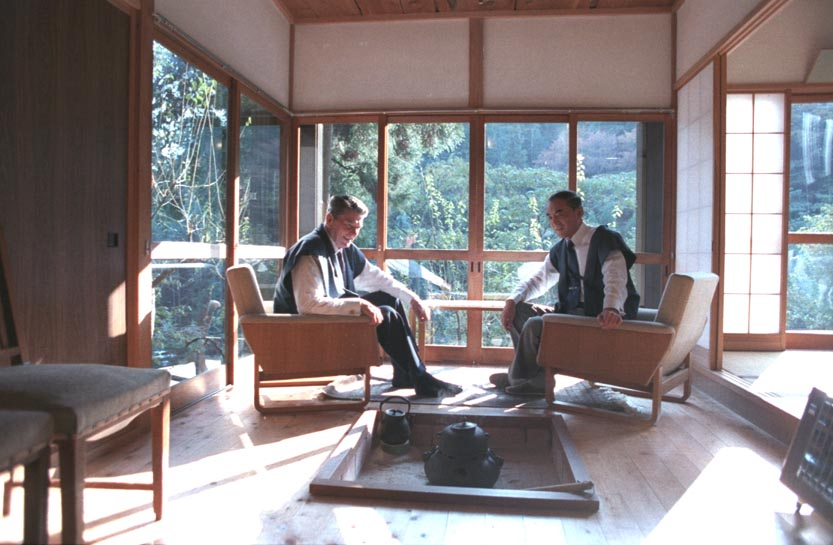
Having lunch with Ronald Reagan (at Nakasone's country residence in Hinode, Nishitama, Tokyo in 1983)

With leaders of the G7 (at the 9th G7 summit in 1983)

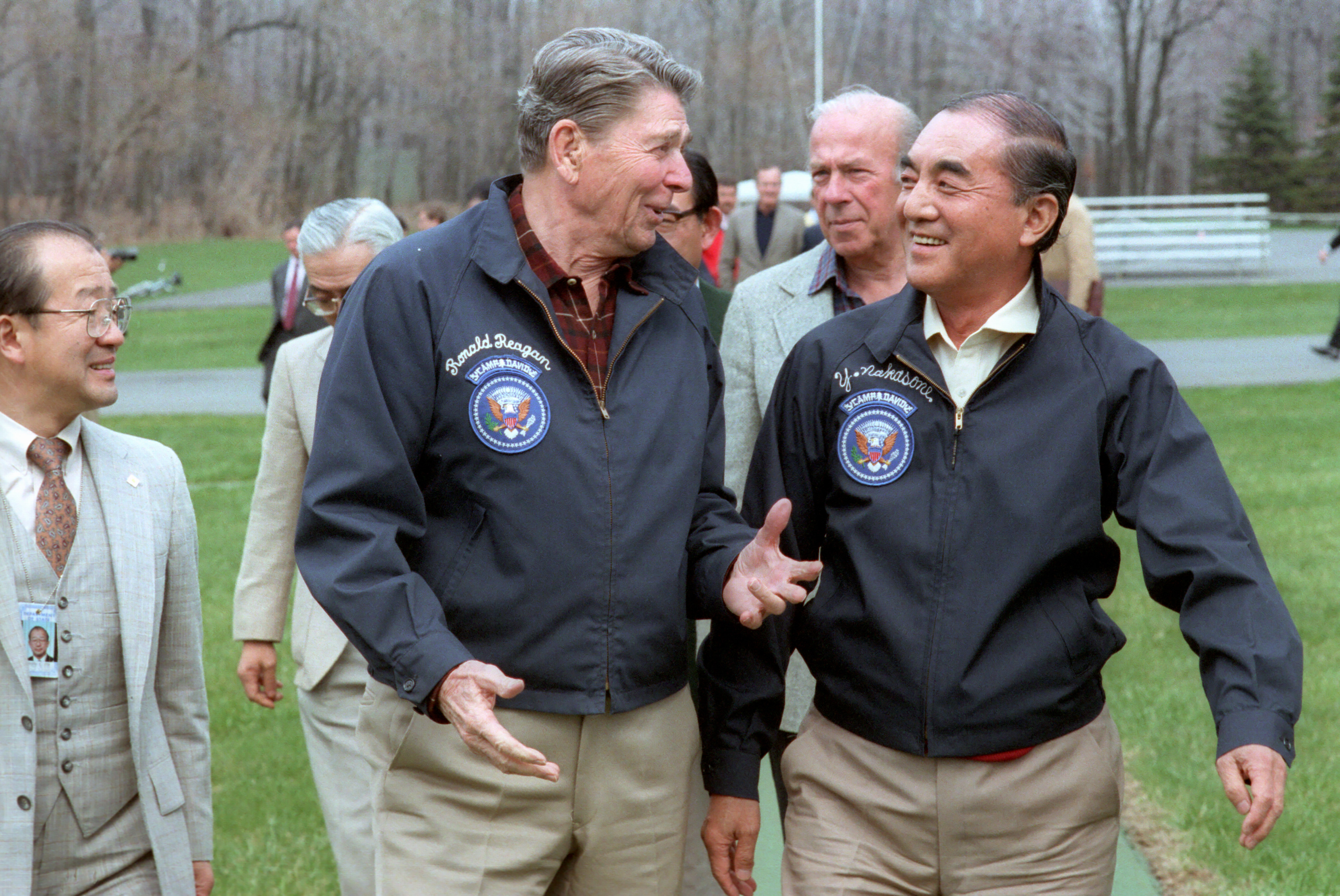
With Ronald Reagan (at Camp David on 13 April 1986)

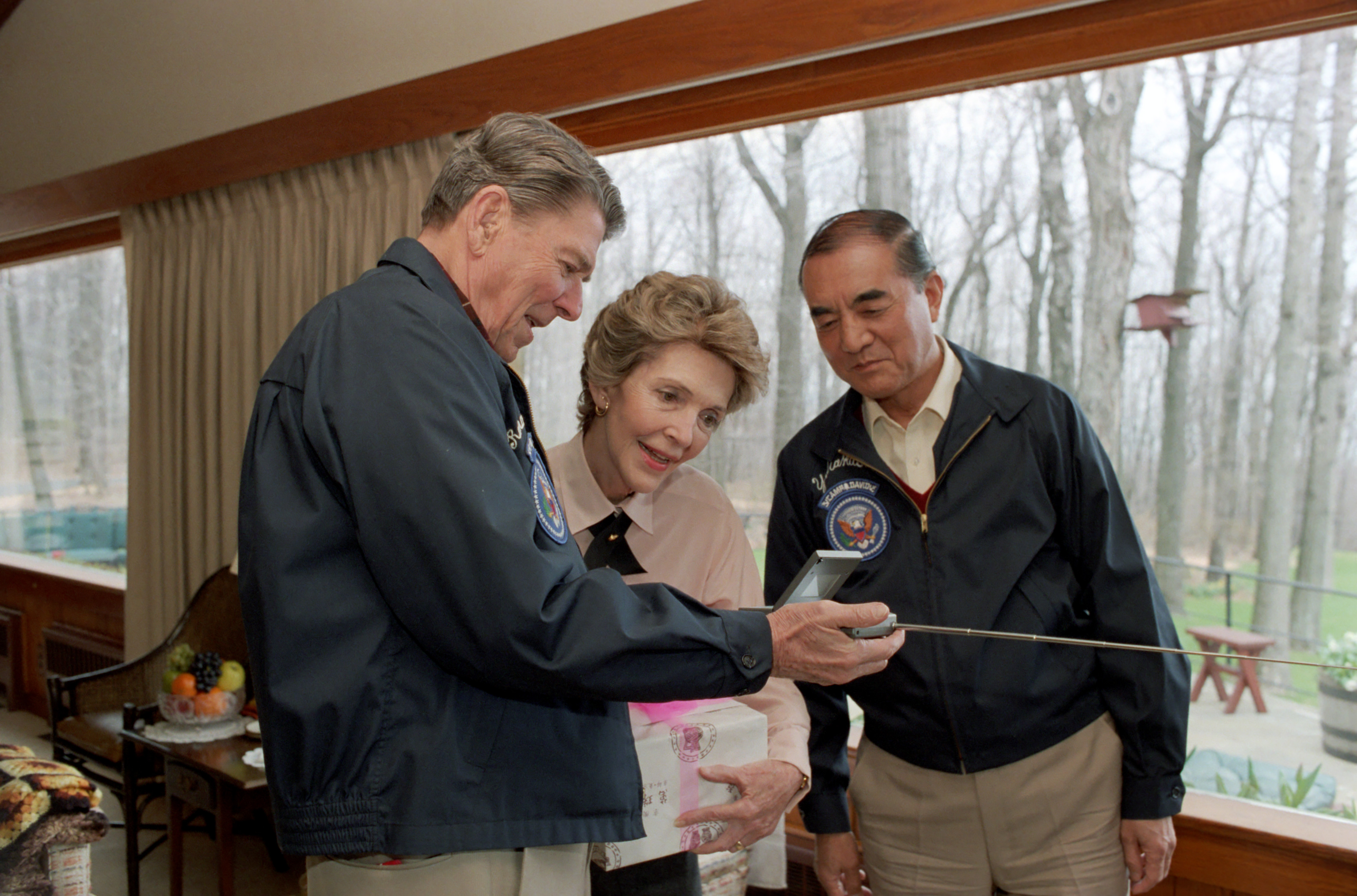
With Ronald Reagan and Nancy Reagan (at Camp David on 13 April 1986)

== Later political life ==
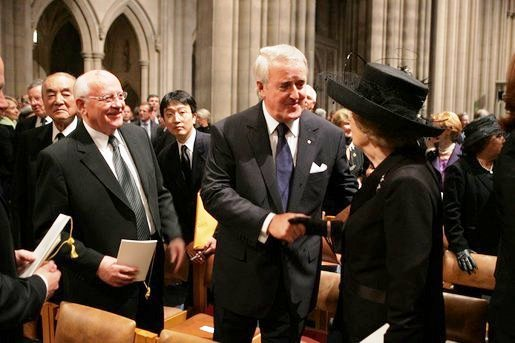
With former Soviet President Mikhail Gorbachev, former Canadian Prime Minister Brian Mulroney, and former UK Prime Minister Margaret Thatcher (at the Funeral of former President Ronald Reagan on 11 June 2004)

Nakasone was replaced by Noboru Takeshita in 1987, and was implicated, along with other LDP lawmakers, in the Recruit scandal that broke the following year.

Although he remained in the Diet for another decade and a half, his influence gradually waned. In 2003, despite a fight, Nakasone was not given a place on the LDP's electoral list as the party, by then led by Jun'ichirō Koizumi, introduced an age limit of 73 years for candidates in the proportional representation blocks, ending his career as a member of the Diet. In 2004, he attended the funeral of his old friend Ronald Reagan.

In 2010, "aware of his status as one of the few leaders revered across Japan's suddenly fractured political landscape" and the country's "most revered elder statesman", Nakasone launched a series of interviews to address the direction of prime minister Yukio Hatoyama's government. In a profile at that time, he saw Hatoyama's "inexperienced left-leaning" government as "challenging Japan's postwar political order and its close relationship with the United States". As well, the LDP was "crumbling into disarray" in the wake of Hatoyama's victory. In the profile, Nakasone described the moment "as a national opening on par with the wrenching social and political changes that followed defeat in the [world] war [and] praised the appearance of a strong second political party as a step toward true democracy". "Being knocked out of power is a good chance to study in the cram school of public opinion", he was quoted as saying of the LDP. He "faulted Mr. Hatoyama for giving Washington the impression that [Hatoyama] valued ties with China more than he did those with the United States. 'Because of the prime minister’s imprudent remarks, the current situation calls for Japan to make efforts to improve things,' he said. The [Japanese] relationship with the United States is different from that with China, he said, because 'it is built on a security alliance, and not just on the alliance, but on the shared values of liberal democracy, and on its shared ideals.'" And relative to another high-profile current source of friction between Japan and the United States, Nakasone said: "Problems like Okinawa [and the American military base there] can be solved by talking together."

== Personal life and death ==
On 11 February 1945, Nakasone married Tsutako Nakasone (30 October 1921 – 7 November 2012). Nakasone's son, Hirofumi Nakasone, is also a member of the Diet; he has served as Minister of Education and as Minister of Foreign Affairs. His grandson, Yasutaka Nakasone, is a member of the House of Representatives.

Nakasone died in Tokyo on 29 November 2019, at the age of 101 years and 186 days. Nakasone was the third oldest Prime Minister of Japan by age after Naruhiko Higashikuni and Tomiichi Murayama.

== Honours ==
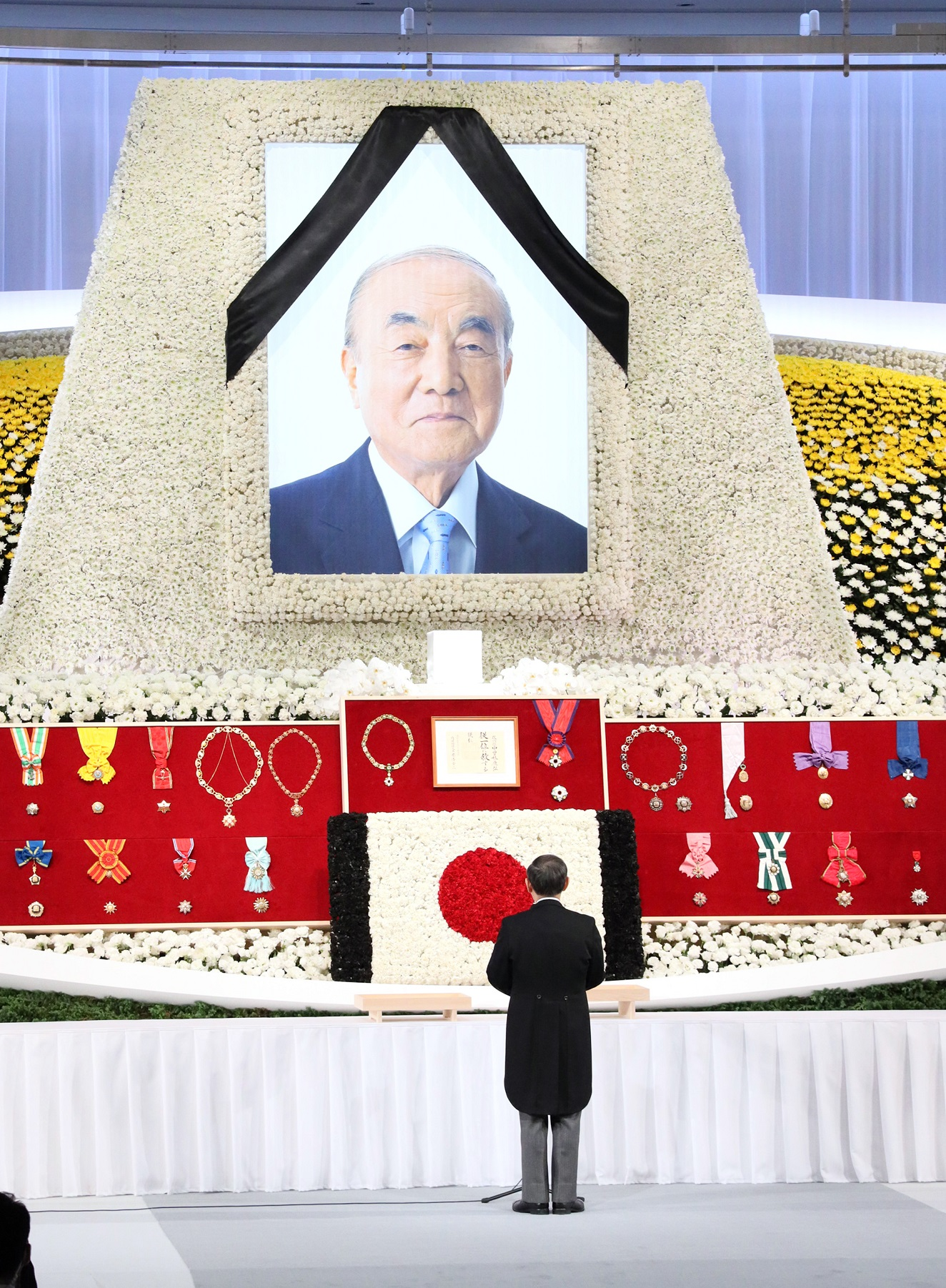
Prime Minister of Japan Yoshihide Suga addressed at the official funeral for Yasuhiro Nakasone at the Grand Prince Hotel Shin Takanawa in Minato Ward, Tōkyō Metropolis on 17 October 2020

=== National honours ===
- Order of the Chrysanthemum:
  - Grand Cordon, 29 April 1997
  - Collar, 29 November 2019 (posthumously)
  - Golden Pheasant Award of the Scout Association of Japan (1986)
  - Junior First Rank (29 November 2019; posthumously)

=== Foreign honours ===
- Mexico:
  - Grand Cross of the Order of the Aztec Eagle
- Germany:
  - Grand Cross 1st Class of the Order of Merit of the Federal Republic of Germany
- Philippines:
  - Grand Collar (Raja) of the Order of Sikatuna
- Egypt:
  - Grand Cordon of the Order of the Nile
- Indonesia:
  - Star of Mahaputera, 1st Class (Indonesian: Bintang Mahaputera Adipurna)
- Norway:
  - Grand Cross (Storkors) of the Order of Saint Olav
- Argentina:
  - Grand Cross of the Order of the Liberator General San Martín
- Brunei:
  - The Most Honourable Order of Seri Paduka Mahkota Brunei, First Class
- Peru:
  - Grand Cross of the Order of Merit for Distinguished Service (Spanish: Orden al Mérito por Servicios Distinguidos)
- Finland:
  - Grand Cross of the Order of the White Rose of Finland
- South Korea:
  - Order of Diplomatic Service Merit, 1st Class (Grand Gwanghwa Medal)
- Thailand:
  - Knight Grand Cordon of the Most Exalted Order of the White Elephant
- France:
  - Grand Officier of the Légion d'honneur

== Offices and distinctions ==
Political offices
Preceded by Zenkō Suzuki	Prime Minister of Japan; 1982–1987	Succeeded by Noboru Takeshita
Preceded by Sōsuke Uno	Minister of State, Head of the Administrative Management Agency; 1980–1982	Succeeded by Kunikichi Saitō
Preceded by Kakuei Tanaka	Minister of International Trade and Industry; 1972–1974	Succeeded by Toshio Kōmoto
Preceded by Tatsunosuke Takasaki; Shirō Kiuchi	Minister of State, Head of the Science and Technology Agency; 1959–1960; 1972	Succeeded by Masuo Araki; Kazuo Maeda
Preceded by Kiichi Arita	Minister of State, Head of the Defense Agency; 1970–1971	Succeeded by Keiichi Masuhara
Preceded by Takeo Ōhashi	Minister of Transport; 1967–1968	Succeeded by Ken Harada
Diplomatic posts
Preceded by Helmut Kohl	Chairperson of the G7; 1986	Succeeded by Amintore Fanfani
Party political offices
Preceded by Zenkō Suzuki	President of the Liberal Democratic Party; 1982–1987	Succeeded by Noboru Takeshita
Preceded by Susumu Nikaidō	Secretary-General of the Liberal Democratic Party; 1974–1976	Succeeded by Tsuneo Uchida
Preceded by Zenkō Suzuki; Masumi Esaki	General Council Chairman of the Liberal Democratic Party; 1971–1972; 1977–1978	Succeeded by Zenkō Suzuki; Kuraishi Tadao
Preceded by Himself (Co-chairman); Umekichi Nakamura (Co-chairman); Yoshio Sakurauchi (Co-chairman)	Chairman of Shinsei Dōshikai (Nakasone faction); 1968–1978	Change of official faction name
New title Change of official faction name	Chairman of Seisaku Kagaku Kenkyūjo (Nakasone faction); 1978–1990	Succeeded by Michio Watanabe
House of Representatives (Japan)
New title New district	Representative for Gunma's 3rd district (multi-member); 1947–1996; Served alongside: Mitsuhei Obuchi, Takeo Fukuda, Tsuruo Yamaguchi, Keizō Obuchi, Yasuo Fukuda, numerous others	District eliminated
New title Introduction of proportional voting	Representative for the Kita-Kantō PR block 1996–2004	Succeeded by Genichiro Sata
Academic offices
Preceded by Yoshiro Ando	Principal of Takushoku University; 1967–1971	Succeeded by Teisuke Toyoda
