= Tokyo 2nd district (1947–1993) =

Legislative district of Japan

Tokyo 2nd district was a constituency of the House of Representatives in the Diet of Japan (national legislature). Between 1947 and 1993 it elected three, later five representatives by single non-transferable vote. It initially consisted of Shinagawa and Ōta in Eastern mainland Tokyo and, following their return from US military administration, Tokyo's Izu and Ogasawara islands. Since the election of 1996, the area forms the new single-member 3rd district.

Prominent representatives from the 2nd district included feminist pioneer Shizue Katō, her husband, labor activist Kanjū Katō, conservative environment and transport minister Shintarō Ishihara and DSP president Keigo Ōuchi.

== Summary of results during the 1955 party system ==
General election		1958	1960	1963	1967	1969	1972	1976	1979	1980	1983	1986	1990	1993
LDP & conservative independents		1	1	2	1	2	2	1	1	1	1	2	2	2
Opposition	center-left	0	0	0	1	2	1	3	2	2	2	1	2	3
Opposition	JSP	2	2	1	1	0	1	1	1	1	1	1	1	0
Opposition	JCP	0	0	0	0	1	1	0	1	1	1	1	0	0
Seats up		3				5								

== Elected Representatives ==
election year	highest vote (top tōsen)	2nd	3rd	4th	5th
1947	Komakichi Matsuoka (JSP)	Shizue Katō (JSP)	Yoshirō Kikuchi (JLP)	–	
1949	Yoshirō Kikuchi (DLP)	Komakichi Matsuoka (JSP)	Kenichi Itō (JCP)	–	
1952	Komakichi Matsuoka (JSP, right)	Tokuma Utsunomiya (LP)	Kanjū Katō (JSP, right)	–	
1953	Kanjū Katō (JSP, right)	Yoshirō Kikuchi (Yoshida LP)	Tokuma Utsunomiya (Yoshida LP)	–	
1955	Komakichi Matsuoka (JSP, right)	Yoshirō Kikuchi (JDP)	Tokuma Utsunomiya (JDP)	–	
1958	Kanjū Katō (JSP)	Tokuma Utsunomiya (LDP)	Komakichi Matsuoka (JSP)	–	
1960	Kanjū Katō (JSP)	Tokuma Utsunomiya (LDP)	Shigeo Ōshiba (JSP)	–	
1963	Shigeo Ōshiba (JSP)	Yoshirō Kikuchi (LDP)	Tokuma Utsunomiya (LDP)	–	
1967	Tokuma Utsunomiya (LDP)	Yasuo Suzukiri (Kōmeitō)	Kanjū Katō (JSP)	–	
1969	Yasuo Suzukiri (Kōmeitō)	Tokuma Utsunomiya (LDP)	Itaru Yonehara (JCP)	Yoshirō Kikuchi (LDP)	Fumio Kawabata (DSP)
1972	Shintarō Ishihara (Indep.)	Itaru Yonehara (JCP)	Shigeo Ōshiba (JSP)	Yasuo Suzukiri (Kōmeitō)	Tokuma Utsunomiya (LDP)
1976	Shintarō Ishihara (LDP)	Yasuo Suzukiri (Kōmeitō)	Keigo Ōuchi (DSP)	Tokuma Utsunomiya (Indep.)	Shigeo Ōshiba (JSP)
1979	Yasuo Suzukiri (Kōmeitō)	Tetsu Ueda (JSP)	Shintarō Ishihara (LDP)	Keigo Ōuchi (DSP)	Toshio Sakaki (JCP)
1980	Shintarō Ishihara (LDP)	Tetsu Ueda (JSP)	Keigo Ōuchi (DSP)	Yasuo Suzukiri (Kōmeitō)	Toshio Sakaki (JCP)
1983	Shintarō Ishihara (LDP)	Yasuo Suzukiri (Kōmeitō)	Keigo Ōuchi (DSP)	Tetsu Ueda (JSP)	Masuhide Okazaki (JCP)
1986	Shintarō Ishihara (LDP)	Shōkei Arai (LDP)	Yasuo Suzukiri (Kōmeitō)	Tetsu Ueda (JSP)	Masuhide Okazaki (JCP)
1990	Shintarō Ishihara (LDP)	Tetsu Ueda (JSP)	Shōkei Arai (LDP)	Keigo Ōuchi (DSP)	Otohiko Endō (Kōmeitō)
1993	Shintarō Ishihara (LDP)	Keigo Ōuchi (DSP)	Shōkei Arai (LDP)	Otohiko Endō (Kōmeitō)	Noboru Usami (NPH)

== Last election result 1993 ==
1993
Party	Candidate	Votes	%	±%
LDP	Shintarō Ishihara	92,259	19.0	
DSP	Keigo Ōuchi	73,314	15.1	
LDP	Shōkei Arai	72,059	14.8	
Kōmeitō (lit. "Justice Party")	Otohiko Endō	70,590	14.5	
NPH	Noboru Usami	62,188	12.8	
JCP	Masuhide Okazaki	57,346	11.8	
JSP	Tetsu Ueda	54,820	11.3	
Independent	Kazumi Tokunaga	2,540	0.5	
Zatsumintō (lit. "Crude People's Party")	Hirokichi Takahashi	348	0.1	
Kokumintō (lit. "People's Party")	Tokuichi Nakamura	335	0.1	
Turnout		489,555	60.45	
