= Hosokawa cabinet =

Cabinet of Japan (1993–1994)

Hosokawa Cabinet
- 79th Cabinet of Japan

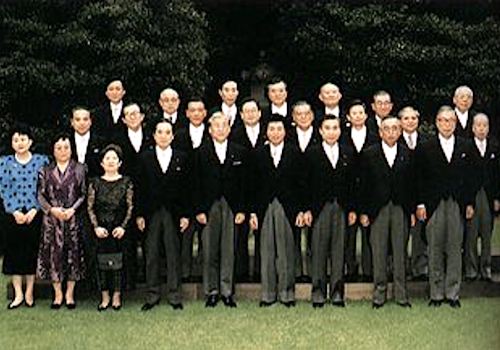
- Date formed: August 9, 1993
- Date dissolved: April 28, 1994

People and organisations
- Emperor: Akihito
- Prime Minister: Morihiro Hosokawa
- Deputy Prime Minister: Tsutomu Hata
- No. of ministers: 21
- Member parties: Japan New Party; Japan Renewal Party; Japan Socialist Party; Kōmeitō; Democratic Socialist Party; New Party Sakigake; Socialist Democratic Federation
- Status in legislature: HoR: Grand coalition HoC: Grand coalition
- Opposition parties: Liberal Democratic Party; Japanese Communist Party
- Opposition leader: Yōhei Kōno (LDP)

History
- Election: 1993 Japanese general election
- Predecessor: Miyazawa Cabinet (Reshuffle)
- Successor: Hata Cabinet

The Hosokawa Cabinet governed Japan from August 9, 1993, to April 28, 1994 under the premiership of Morihiro Hosokawa. In Japan, his administration is generally referred to as a representative example of non-LDP and non-JCP Coalition.

== Political background ==
Formed in the aftermath of the 1993 general election, this cabinet was a broad based coalition of parties of both left (the JSP, SDF and DSP), right (JRP, JNP and NPS) and religious politics (Komeito). A series of defections had cost the LDP its majority before the 1993 election, after which all non-Communist opposition parties coalesced with the aim of creating the first non-LDP government in 38 years and achieving electoral reform. Despite the fact that the conservative Japan Renewal Party and the left-wing Japan Socialist Party were the largest parties in the coalition, Ichirō Ozawa (who negotiated the formation of the government) and his allies in the JRP pushed for Morihiro Hosokawa, a former governor of Kumamoto Prefecture and the leader of the small Japan New Party, to lead the government. Hosokawa was elected by the Diet on August 6, and took office as the first non-LDP Prime Minister for four decades. The Prime Minister himself was the only New Party member of the cabinet, which was mostly dominated by the JRP and the Socialists.

The coalition achieved Hosokawa's goal of electoral reform, replacing the previous system of multi-member districts with a combined system of single-member districts, elected by first past the post, and blocs of proportional representation candidates. But having achieved this, and replaced the LDP, the unifying purpose of the coalition was lost and ideological differences between the parties, especially over tax and defence policy, began to split the cabinet. Following revelations of a campaign finance scandal, Hosokawa announced his surprise resignation on April 8, 1994. After several weeks of negotiations, foreign minister Tsutomu Hata of the JRP became Prime Minister on April 28.

== Election of the prime minister ==
August 6, 1993 Absolute majority (256/511) required
House of Representatives
Choice	First Vote
Choice	Votes
Morihiro Hosokawa	262 / 511
Yōhei Kōno	224 / 511
Others and Abstentions (Including Speaker and Deputy)	25 / 511

== Ministers ==
Japan New
Renewal
New Party Sakigake
Komeito
Democratic Socialist
Socialist
Independent
R = Member of the House of Representatives
C = Member of the House of Councillors

Cabinet of Morihiro Hosokawa from August 9, 1993, to April 28, 1994
Portfolio	Minister		Term of Office
Prime Minister	Morihiro Hosokawa	R	August 9, 1993 – April 28, 1994
Chief Cabinet Secretary	Masayoshi Takemura	R	August 9, 1993 – April 28, 1994
Deputy Prime Minister; Minister of Foreign Affairs	Tsutomu Hata	R	August 9, 1993 – April 28, 1994
Minister of Justice	Akira Mikazuki	-	August 9, 1993 – April 28, 1994
Minister of Finance	Hirohisa Fujii	R	August 9, 1993 – June 30, 1994
Minister of Education	Ryōko Akamatsu	-	August 9, 1993 – June 30, 1994
Minister of Health and Welfare	Keigo Ōuchi	R	August 9, 1993 – June 30, 1994
Minister of Labour	Chikara Sakaguchi	R	August 9, 1993 – April 28, 1994
Minister of Agriculture, Forestry and Fisheries	Eijiro Hata	R	August 9, 1993 – April 28, 1994
Minister of International Trade and Industry	Hiroshi Kumagai	R	August 9, 1993 – April 28, 1994
Minister of Transport	Shigeru Itō	R	August 9, 1993 – April 28, 1994
Minister of Construction	Kozo Igarashi	R	August 9, 1993 – April 28, 1994
Minister of Home Affairs; Director of the National Public Safety Commission	Kanju Sato	R	August 9, 1993 – April 28, 1994
Minister of Posts and Telecommunications	Takenori Kanzaki	R	August 9, 1993 – April 28, 1994
Director of the Management and Coordination Agency	Koshiro Ishida	R	August 9, 1993 – June 30, 1994
Director of the Japan Defense Agency	Keisuke Nakanishi	R	August 9, 1993 – December 1, 1993
Director of the Japan Defense Agency	Kazuo Aichi	R	December 1, 1993 – April 28, 1994
Director of the National Land Agency; Director of the Hokkaido Development Agency; Director of the Okinawa Development Agency Development,	Kosuke Uehara	R	August 9, 1993 – April 28, 1994
Director of the Economic Planning Agency	Manae Kubota	C	August 9, 1993 – April 28, 1994
Director of the Environment Agency	Wakako Hironaka	C	August 9, 1993 – April 28, 1994
Director of the Science and Technology Agency	Satsuki Eda	R	August 9, 1993 – April 28, 1994
Minister of State (in charge of political reform)	Sadao Yamahana	R	August 9, 1993 – April 28, 1994
Deputy Chief Cabinet Secretary (for Political Affairs)	Yukio Hatoyama	R	August 9, 1993 – April 28, 1994
Deputy Chief Cabinet Secretary (for Administrative Affairs)	Nobuo Ishihara	-	August 9, 1993 – April 28, 1994

=== Changes ===
- December 1 – Defence Minister Keisuke Nakanishi resigned over controversial remarks he made related to Japan's pacifist constitution, and was replaced by Kazuo Aichi.
