= Eiichi Nishimura (socialist politician) =

Japanese politician

- 西村 栄一
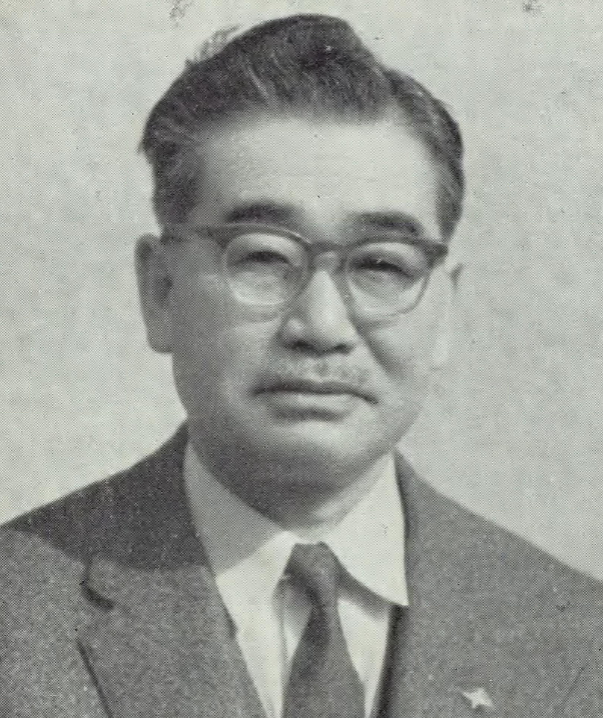
- Nishimura in 1962

Chairman of the Democratic Socialist Party
- In office June 1967 – 27 April 1971
- Preceded by: Suehiro Nishio
- Succeeded by: Kasuga Ikkō

Member of the House of Representatives
- In office 11 April 1946 – 27 April 1971
- Preceded by: Constituency established
- Succeeded by: Sadao Wada
- Constituency: Osaka 2nd (1946–1947); Osaka 5th (1947–1971)

Personal details
- Born: 8 March 1904 Kamata, Nara, Japan
- Died: 27 April 1971 (aged 67) Minato, Tokyo, Japan
- Party: Democratic Socialist
- Other political affiliations: SDP (before 1932); Shakai Taishūtō (1932–1940); JSP (1946–1951; 1955–1960); RSP (1951–1955)
- Children: Shingo Nishimura

Eiichi Nishimura (Japanese: 西村 栄一, Nishimura Eiichi; 8 March 1904 – 27 April 1971) was a Japanese politician who served as the second chairman of the Democratic Socialist Party from 1967 to his death in 1971.

== Early life ==
Nishimura was born in a farmhouse in Kamata village (today a part of Gose, Nara) to a lumber-dealing father. After his father went bankrupt in 1910, Nishimura was entrusted to family relatives in Tokyo and went by himself to live with them. He studied at a French high school in Shanghai. While at Shanghai, Nishimura has said that he considered being baptised, but that he decided against it because he was unable to keep the Ten Commandments.

Nishimura was hard-working and worked a number of different jobs throughout his youth, such as being a shopkeeper, a hardware dealer for nails, and, after returning to his native Osaka (which was right next to his home village), he became an office assistant at an insurance company. Eventually, after reaching the age of 31, he was made the manager of the company's Osaka branch. In 1931, he was made a member of the central committee for the National Labor and Agriculture Mass Party.

== Political career ==
In 1933, he joined the Sakai city council, where he helped to form a national office worker union which was forcibly dissolved by the government only half a year later. In the 1946 election, he was elected to the House of Representatives as a member of the Right Socialist Party of Japan. In 1948, he served in the Ashida Cabinet as the Deputy Minister for Economic Stability.

In 1950, Nishimura met with Prime Minister Jawaharlal Nehru during a visit to India, and that Prime Minister Nehru had convinced him to encourage the Chinese communists to reconsider the pro-Soviet foreign policy they had at the time. Nishimura further explained that he and Nehru agreed that the best course of action was for India, China, and Japan to form an Asian coalition so as to prevent the Korean War from extending beyond the Korean peninsula.

While asking Prime Minister Shigeru Yoshida a question during a heated discussion at the House of Representatives Budget Committee in February 1953, Yoshida reflexively muttered "goddamn idiot" (bakayarō), which was accidentally picked up by his microphone. This further intensified the heated atmosphere and Yoshida dissolved the House of Representatives soon thereafter, an event which is still known as the bakayarō dissolution.

While a member of the Right Socialist Party of Japan, Nishimura was among those who took a more moderate stance on defence policies and the US-Japan Security Treaty, arguing that the United States should protect Japan for three years, during which Japan can develop its own independent defense forces, and after which the United States should withdraw all of its military presence from Japanese soil.

In 1967, Nishimura became the second Chairman of the Democratic Socialist Party, succeeding Suehiro Nishio. Under his rather brief tenure as chairman, the DSP's electoral performance was very stable, increasing their popular vote share by only 0.1% and their number of Diet seats by 3 in the 1968 House of Councillors election, and increasing their popular vote share by only 0.3% and gaining a single seat in the 1969 House of Representatives election. This was in contrast to the Japan Socialist Party, which saw heavy losses, and both Komeito as well as the Japanese Communist Party, both of which saw healthy victories. In preparation for the 1971 House of Councillors election, Nishimura called for a coalition between the JSP, Kōmeitō, and DSP, which resulted in only limited cooperation between the parties. However, Nishimura would pass away only a few months before the 1971 elections, which saw the Diet's landscape remain relatively stable compared to the past elections. Nishimura died on 27 April 1971.

== Personal life ==
In 1969, he established the Fuji Social Education Centre.

Although he decided not to be baptised as a youth in Shanghai, he finally received a deathbed baptism a day before his death.

His fourth son was Shingo Nishimura, a member of the House of Representatives.
