= Ider Luvsandanzan =

First female Mongolian Ambassador

Ider Luvsandanzan (March 1937), also spelled as Luvsandanzangiin and Luvsandanzangyn, is a Mongolian diplomat who was active between 1963 and 1992. She was the first woman in Mongolia with the rank of Ambassador Extraordinary and Plenipotentiary. Luvsandanzan was the first Chairperson of the Committee on the Convention on the Elimination of All Forms of Discrimination Against Women.

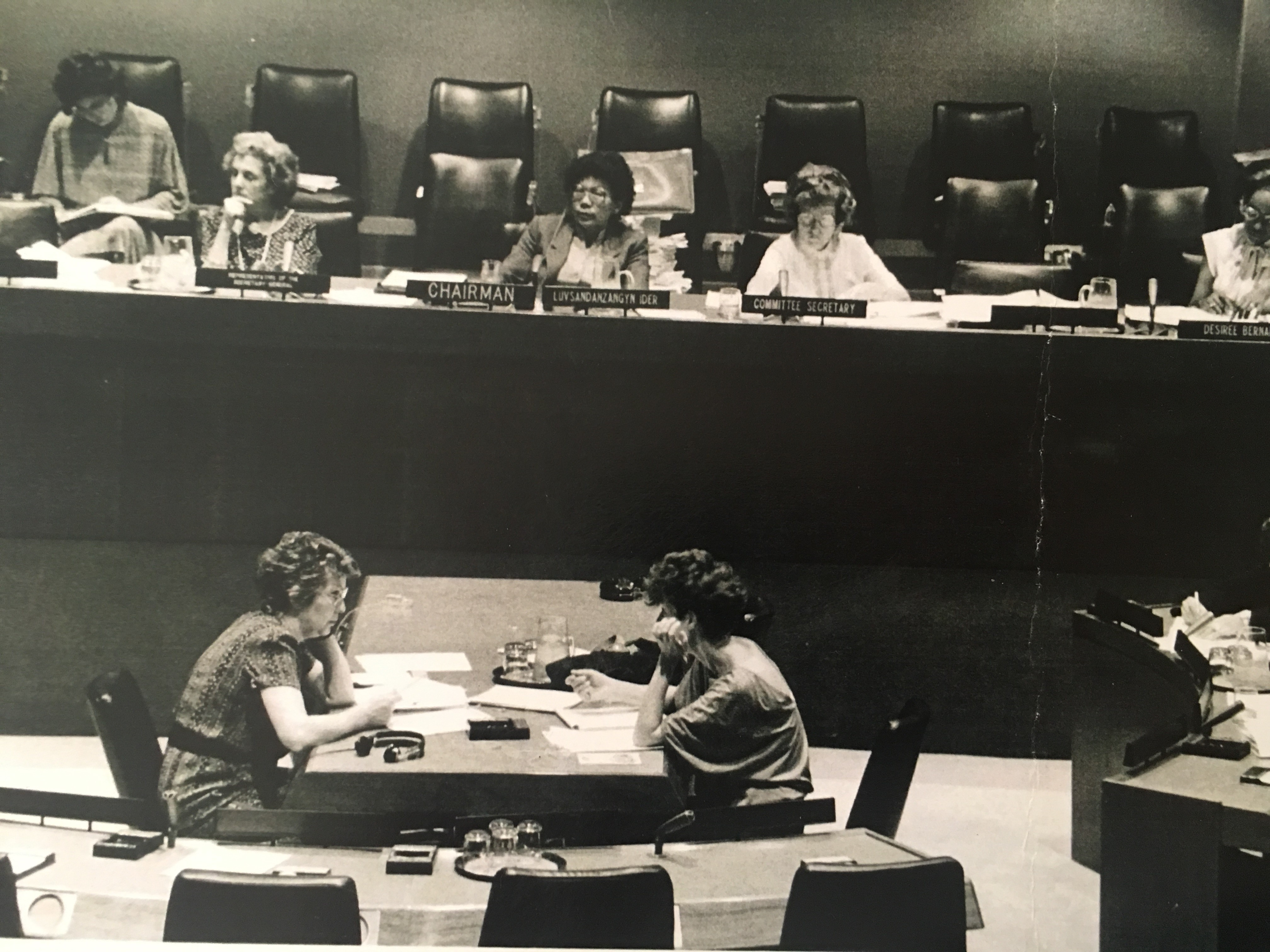

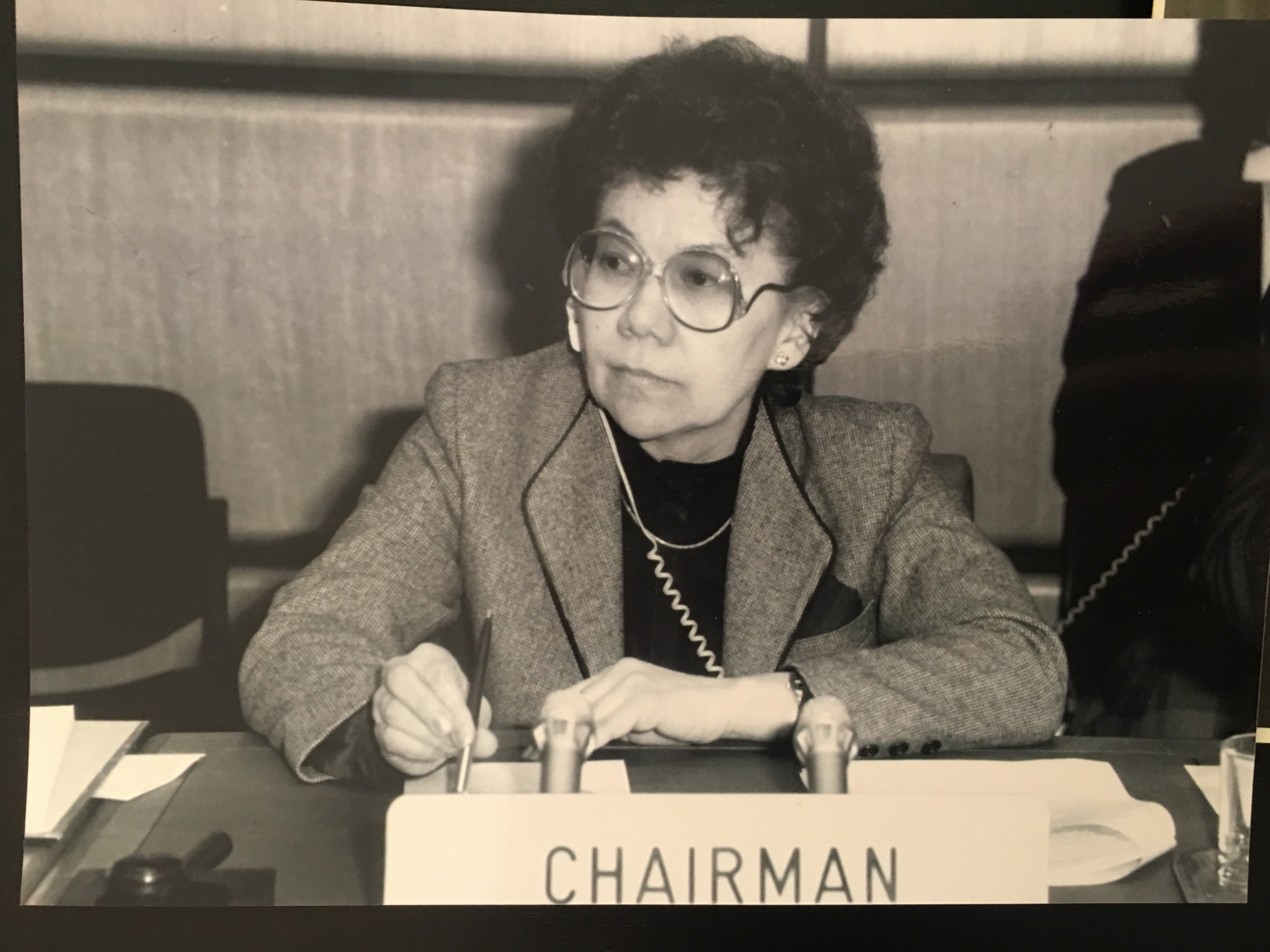

== Education ==
- 1963-Diploma, Institute of International Relations, Moscow.
- 1982- Diploma, Diplomatic Academy, Moscow.
- 1965- English Language Course, Leeds University.

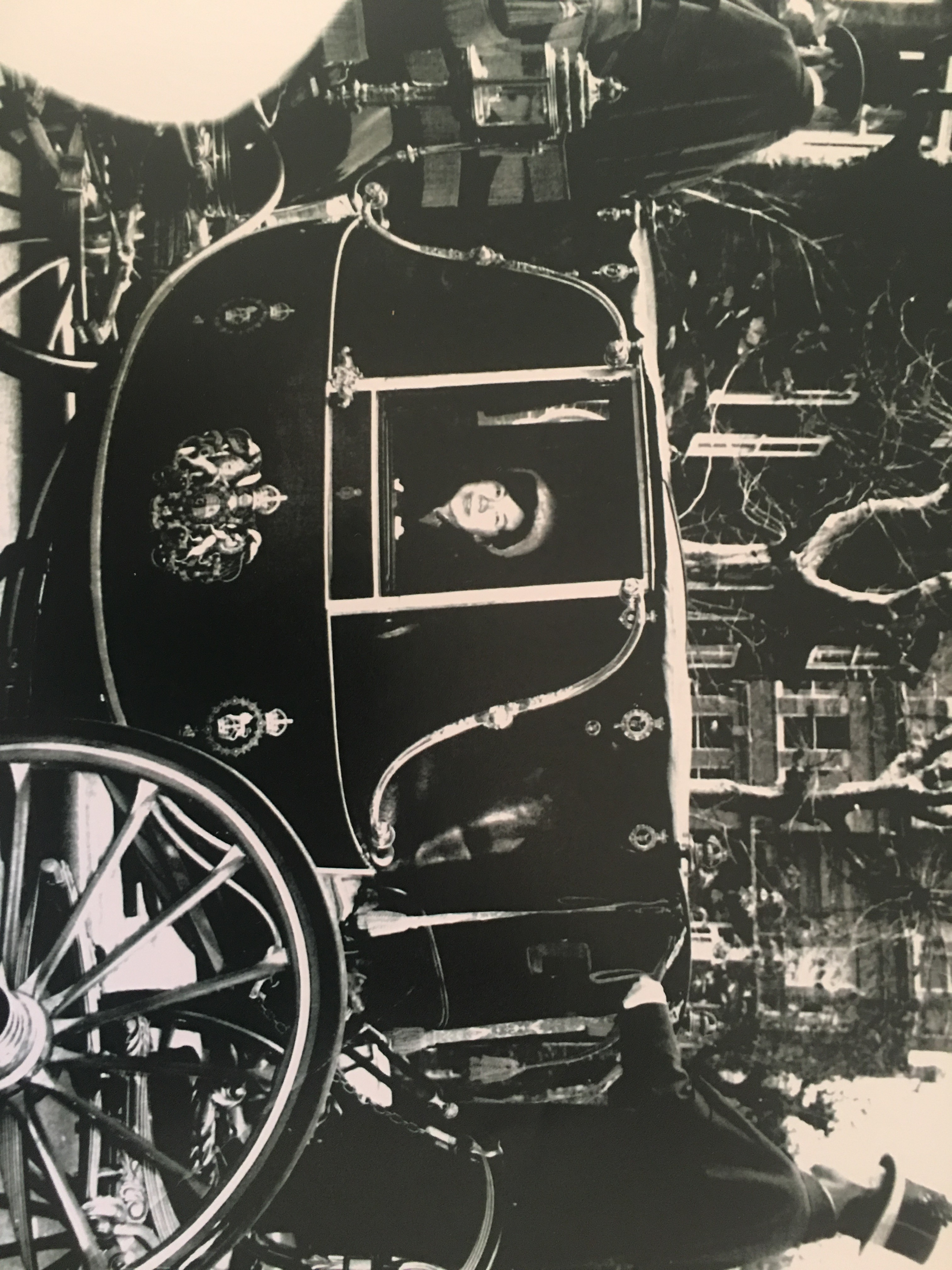

== Career ==
=== Diplomatic positions ===
- 1963-1972- Desk Officer, Department of International Organizations, Ministryof Foreign Affairs of Mongolia.
- 1973-1976- Second Secretary, Embassy of Mongolia in London.
- 1977-1979 and 1981-1986- Director, Department of International Organizations, Ministry of Foreign Affairs of Mongolia.
- 1986-1989 — Chargé d'affaires of Mongolia in France and Permanent Delegate of Mongolia to UNESCO.
- 1989-1992- Director, Department of Treaty and Legal Affairs, Ministry of Foreign Affairs of Mongolia.
- 1993-up to August 2006 – Adviser for Foreign Affairs, Supreme Court of Mongolia.

=== Roles in international organizations ===
- 1962-1985 - UN General Assembly sessions (as an expert, adviser, member of delegation);
- 1972- Rapporteur, Third Committee, UN General Assembly for Elimination of All Forms of Racial Discrimination;
- 1977- Vice-chairperson, Third Committee, UN General Assembly;
- 1977—Chairperson, Working Group, Third Committee, UN General Assembly on drafting a Convention on the Elimination of All Forms of Discrimination Against Women;
- 1977—1986— Representative of Mongolia, UN Commission for Social Development;
- 1979- Vice-chairperson, UN Commission for Social Development;
- 1985- chairperson, UN Commission for Social Development;
- 1982-1984- First Chairperson for the UN Committee on the Elimination of Discrimination Against Women.
- 1984-1986- Member of the UN Committee on the Elimination of Discrimination Against Women;
- 1991-1994 - Member the UN Committee on Economic, Social and Cultural Rights. Twice served as a member of the sessional working group;

=== Activities in Mongolia ===
- 1991- Member, Working Group of Experts on drafting the New Constitution of Mongolia. (Particularly parts of the Constitution related Fundamental Human Rights and Judicial Power)
- 1993-2005 – Established and developed foreign relations of Supreme Court of Mongolia.
- 1992 — Initiated a comprehensive project on promotion and implementation of human rights in Mongolia, which was successfully implemented by the United Nations Human Rights Centre under UN Technical Assistance Program.
- 1993 - Translated in cooperation with two other translators the text of the old Code of Criminal Procedure of Mongolia from Mongolian into English (for analysis by UN experts on Human Rights)
- 2005 — Checked and edited the translation from English into Mongolian of the Manual on Human Rights for Judges, Prosecutors and Lawyers. (Office of the High Commissioner for Human Rights in cooperation with the International Bar Association)
- 2006- Translated from English into Mongolian 8 Modules on combating money laundry prepared by World Bank.

== Awards ==
- Ryoko Akamatsu Award of the Japanese Association of International Women's Rights for the significant contribution to the elaboration of the Convention on the Elimination of All Forms of Discrimination against Women (Tokyo).
- Award for the contribution to drafting the Constitution of Mongolia, award given by the Government of Mongolia on the occasion of the Anniversary of the adoption of the Constitution.
- Ambassador Extraordinary and Plenipotenciary
