= Hata cabinet =

Cabinet of Japan (1994)

Hata Cabinet
- 80th Cabinet of Japan

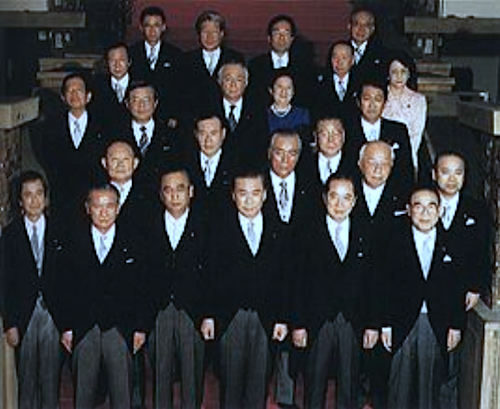
- Prime Minister Tsutomu Hata (front row, 3rd from right) and cabinet at the Kantei, April 28, 1994
- Date formed: April 28, 1994
- Date dissolved: June 30, 1994

People and organisations
- Emperor: Akihito
- Prime Minister: Tsutomu Hata
- Member party: Japan Renewal Party; Komeito; Japan New Party; Democratic Socialist Party; Liberal Reform League; Independent
- Status in legislature: HoR: Minority coalition HoC: Minority coalition
- Opposition party: Liberal Democratic Party; Japan Socialist Party; Japanese Communist Party
- Opposition leader: Yōhei Kōno

History
- Predecessor: Hosokawa Cabinet
- Successor: Murayama Cabinet

The Hata Cabinet governed Japan for two months from April 28 to June 30, 1994, under the leadership of Tsutomu Hata of the Japan Renewal Party.

== Political background ==
Hata became Prime Minister following the resignation of Morihiro Hosokawa as head of the coalition government that had come to power following the 1993 general election. In the aftermath of the resignation, the Japan Socialist Party supported Hata's candidacy but left the coalition due to differences over defense policy with the more conservative JRP, reducing the government to minority status in the House of Representatives. This led to the fall of the government in June, when the Socialists formed a coalition deal with their traditional rivals, the Liberal Democratic Party and Hata resigned in favor of Tomiichi Murayama rather than face a confidence vote and force new elections. The Hata cabinet had the shortest tenure of any in postwar Japanese history at 63 days in office, two days less than the Ishibashi cabinet. The parties that made up the coalition would later merge to form the New Frontier Party in December 1994.

== Election of the prime minister ==
25 April 1994 Absolute majority (256/511) required
House of Representatives
Choice	First Vote
Choice	Votes
Tsutomu Hata	274 / 511
Yohei Kono	207 / 511
Tetsuzo Fuwa	15 / 511
Blank Ballot	6 / 511
Abstentions (Including Speaker and Deputy)	9 / 511
Source Political Data: Japanese Politics 1994

== Ministers ==
Japan Renewal Party
Komeito
Democratic Socialist Party
Japan New Party
Liberal Reform League
Independent
R = Member of the House of Representatives
C = Member of the House of Councillors

Cabinet of Tsutomu Hata from April 28 to June 30, 1994
Portfolio	Minister		Term of Office
Prime Minister	Tsutomu Hata	R	April 28, 1994 - June 30, 1994
Minister of Justice	Shigeto Nagano	C	April 28, 1994 - May 8, 1994
Minister of Justice	Hiroshi Nakai	R	May 8, 1994 - June 30, 1994
Minister of Foreign Affairs	Koji Kakizawa	R	April 28, 1994 - June 30, 1994
Minister of Finance	Hirohisa Fujii	R	August 9, 1993 - June 30, 1994
Minister of Education	Ryōko Akamatsu	-	August 9, 1993 - June 30, 1994
Minister of Health and Welfare	Keigo Ōuchi	R	August 9, 1993 - June 30, 1994
Minister of Agriculture, Forestry and Fisheries	Mutsuki Kato	R	April 28, 1994 - June 30, 1994
Minister of International Trade and Industry	Eijiro Hata	R	April 28, 1994 - June 30, 1994
Minister of Transport	Nobuaki Futami	R	April 28, 1994 - June 30, 1994
Minister of Posts and Telecommunications	Katsuyuki Higasa	R	April 28, 1994 - June 30, 1994
Minister of Labour	Kunio Hatoyama	R	April 28, 1994 - June 30, 1994
Minister of Construction	Koji Morimoto	R	April 28, 1994 - June 30, 1994
Minister of Home Affairs; Director of the National Public Safety Commission; Minister in charge of political reform	Hajime Ishii	R	April 28, 1994 - June 30, 1994
Chief Cabinet Secretary	Hiroshi Kumagai	R	April 28, 1994 - June 30, 1994
Director of the Management and Coordination Agency	Koshiro Ishida	R	August 9, 1993 - June 30, 1994
Director of the Japan Defense Agency	Atsushi Kanda	R	April 28, 1994 - June 30, 1994
Director of the Economic Planning Agency	Yoshio Terasawa	C	April 28, 1994 - June 30, 1994
Director of the Science and Technology Agency	Mikio Omi	R	April 28, 1994 - June 30, 1994
Director of the Environment Agency	Toshiko Hamayotsu	C	April 28, 1994 - June 30, 1994
Director of the National Land Agency	Megumu Sato	R	April 28, 1994 - June 30, 1994
Director of the Hokkaido Development Agency; Director of the Okinawa Development Agency	Moriyoshi Sato	R	April 28, 1994 - June 30, 1994

=== Changes ===
- May 8 - Justice Minister Shigeto Nagano resigned after claiming that the Nanjing Massacre had not occurred and was replaced with Hiroshi Nakai.

== See also ==
- Non-LDP and non-JCP Coalition
