= Otohiko Endō =

Japanese politician

- 遠藤 乙彦
- Official portrait, 2007

Member of the House of Representatives
- In office 9 November 2003 – 16 November 2012
- Constituency: Northern Kanto PR
- In office 19 February 1990 – 2 June 2000
- Preceded by: Yasuo Suzukiri
- Succeeded by: Multi-member district
- Constituency: Tokyo 2nd (1990–1996); Tokyo PR (1996–2000)

Personal details
- Born: 1 February 1947 (age 79) Gifu Prefecture, Japan
- Party: Komeito
- Other political affiliations: CGP (1990–1994); NFP (1994–1998)
- Education: Keio University; University of Cambridge

Otohikon Endō (乙彦 遠藤; born 1 February 1947) is a Japanese politician from the New Komeito Party, and a former member of the House of Representatives in the Diet (national legislature).

== Early life ==
A native of Gifu, Gifu and graduate of Keio University, he joined the Ministry of Foreign Affairs in 1969, attending the University of Cambridge while in the ministry.

== Political career ==
Leaving the ministry in 1988, he was elected for the first time in 1990.

Political offices
Preceded by Kazunori Tanaka; Shigeyuki Tomita	Senior Vice Minister of Finance; 2007–2008; Served alongside: Hiroshi Moriyama	Succeeded by Wataru Takeshita; Kōichi Hirata
House of Representatives (Japan)
Preceded by –	Representative for the Northern Kantō PR block 2003–present	Incumbent
New title Introduction of proportional voting	Representative for the Tokyo PR block 1996–2000	Succeeded by –
Preceded by Shintarō Ishihara; Shōkei Arai; Yasuo Suzukiri; Tetsu Ueda; Masuhide Okazaki	Representative for Tokyo 2nd district (multi-member); 1990–1996; Served alongside: Shintarō Ishihara, Tetsu Ueda, Shōkei Arai, Keigo Ōuchi, Noboru Usami	District eliminated
