= 1972 Japanese general election =

- 10 December 1972

All 491 seats in the House of Representatives 246 seats needed for a majority
- Turnout: 71.76% (▲3.25pp)
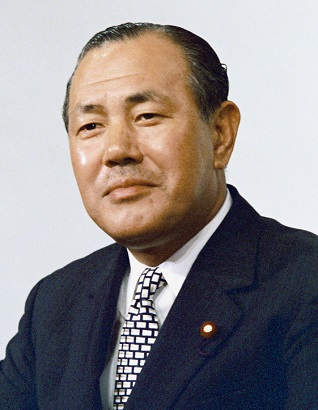

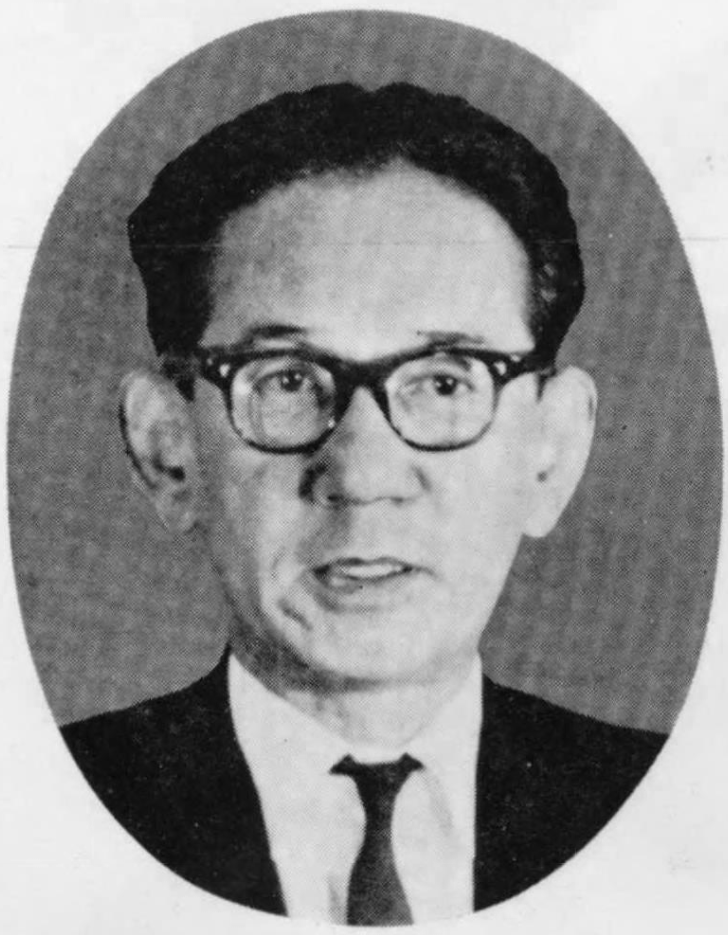

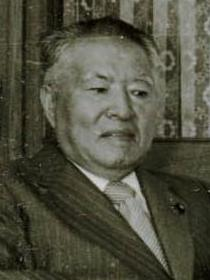

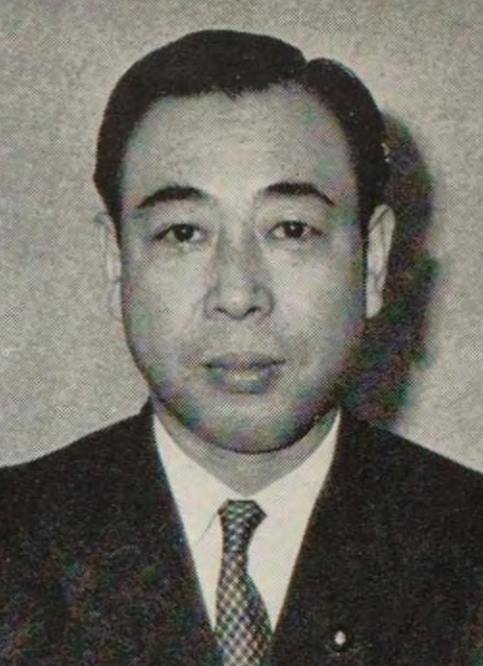

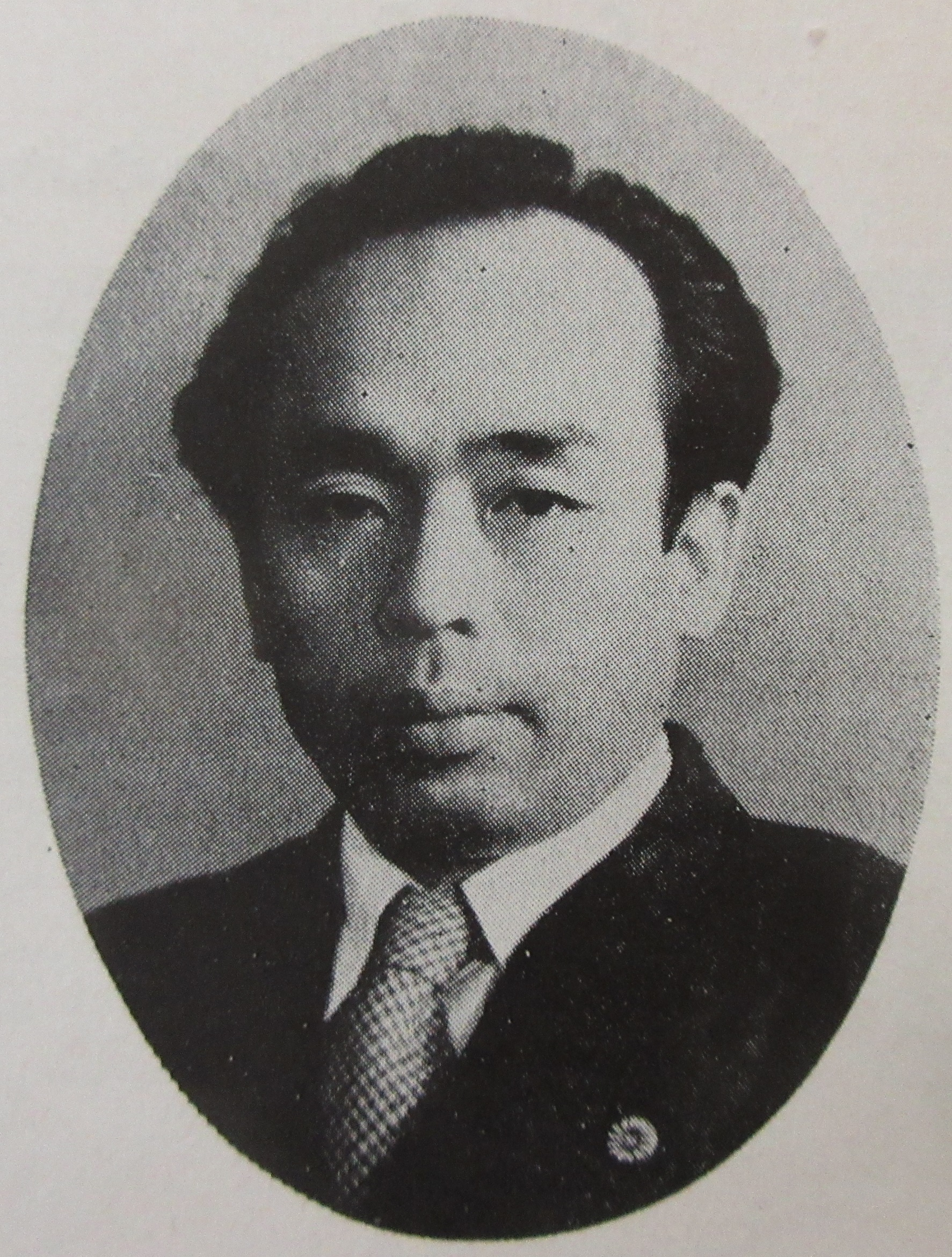
	First party	Second party	Third party
Leader	Kakuei Tanaka	Tomomi Narita	Kenji Miyamoto
Party	LDP	Socialist	JCP
Last election	47.63%, 288 seats	21.44%, 90 seats	6.81%, 14 seats
Seats won	271	118	38
Seat change	▼17	▲28	▲24
Popular vote	24,563,199	11,478,742	5,496,827
Percentage	46.85%	21.90%	10.49%
Swing	▼0.78pp	▲0.46pp	▲3.68pp
	Fourth party	Fifth party
Leader	Yoshikatsu Takeiri	Kasuga Ikkō
Party	Kōmeitō	Democratic Socialist
Last election	10.91%, 47 seats	7.74%, 31 seats
Seats won	29	19
Seat change	▼18	▼12
Popular vote	4,436,755	3,660,953
Percentage	8.46%	6.98%
Swing	▼2.45pp	▼0.76pp
Prime Minister before election
Kakuei Tanaka
LDP
Elected Prime Minister
Kakuei Tanaka
LDP

General elections were held in Japan on 10 December 1972. The result was a victory for the Liberal Democratic Party, which won 271 of the 491 seats. Voter turnout was 71.76%.

Little changed in the aftermath of the election; the LDP saw a slight decrease in seat numbers (debatably due to it fielding more candidates than ever before as a result of regained confidence in 1969), and its vote share remained below 50% (even with the addition of conservative-aligned independents). The Japan Socialist Party won over 100 seats following its disastrous results in the 1969 Japanese general election, although infighting continued within the party over choosing cooperation with Kōmeitō or the Japanese Communist Party, coined "Civil Service or Joint Struggle". Fears remained that it would be overtaken by the resurgence of the JCP.

The Japanese Communist Party was arguably the biggest winner of the election. Its seat count nearly tripled in relation to the 1969 election, and in the span of two elections, it had gone from 5 to 38 seats. This meant it beat its post-war peak of 35 representatives in 1949. The other two opposition parties, the DSP and Kōmeitō, suffered losses despite cooperation with each other. Kōmeitō was going through a series of scandals around its censorship of press critical to it (aptly named the Press Publication Obstruction cases) which severely damaged its public image, and gave favor to the JCP, with image of the Soka Gakkai as a cult beginning to emerge. The DSP also lost 12 seats.

== Results ==
Party	Votes	%	Seats	+/–
Liberal Democratic Party	24,563,199	46.85	271	−17
Japan Socialist Party	11,478,742	21.90	118	+28
Japanese Communist Party	5,496,827	10.49	38	+24
Kōmeitō	4,436,755	8.46	29	−18
Democratic Socialist Party	3,660,953	6.98	19	−12
Other parties	143,019	0.27	2	+2
Independents	2,645,582	5.05	14	−2
Total	52,425,077	100.00	491	+5
Valid votes	52,425,077	99.04		
Invalid/blank votes	510,234	0.96		
Total votes	52,935,311	100.00		
Registered voters/turnout	73,769,636	71.76		
Source: Statistics Bureau of Japan

Seats won per district

=== By prefecture ===
Prefecture	Total seats	Seats won						
Prefecture	Total seats	LDP	JSP	JCP	Kōmeitō	DSP	Others	Ind.
Aichi	20	9	6		1	3		1
Akita	8	5	2	1				
Aomori	7	5	1	1				
Chiba	13	9	2	1				1
Ehime	9	6	2					1
Fukui	4	3	1					
Fukuoka	19	5	4	3	2	3		2
Fukushima	12	10	2					
Gifu	9	7	2					
Gunma	10	7	3					
Hiroshima	12	8	3			1		
Hokkaido	22	11	9	1		1		
Hyōgo	19	9	4	2	3	1		
Ibaraki	12	9	3					
Ishikawa	6	5	1					
Iwate	8	5	3					
Kagawa	6	4	2					
Kagoshima	11	6	2					3
Kanagawa	14	5	3	3	2	1		
Kōchi	5	3	1	1				
Kumamoto	10	6	2		1			1
Kyoto	10	3	2	3		2		
Mie	9	6	2		1			
Miyagi	9	6	2	1				
Miyazaki	6	3	2			1		
Nagano	13	7	4	1		1		
Nagasaki	9	5	2		1	1		
Nara	5	3	1		1			
Niigata	15	10	5					
Ōita	7	5	2					
Okayama	10	6	3		1			
Okinawa	5	2	1				2	
Osaka	23	7	4	6	6			
Saga	5	4	1					
Saitama	13	8	3	1	1			
Shiga	5	4		1				
Shimane	5	4	1					
Shizuoka	14	8	3	1	1	1		
Tochigi	10	6	3			1		
Tokushima	5	3	1		1			
Tokyo	39	13	7	10	6	1		2
Tottori	4	2	1					1
Toyama	6	2	2					2
Wakayama	6	3	1	1	1			
Yamagata	8	5	3					
Yamaguchi	9	6	2			1		
Yamanashi	5	3	2					
Total	491	271	118	38	29	19	2	14
