= 1963 Japanese general election =

- 21 November 1963

All 467 seats in the House of Representatives 234 seats needed for a majority
- Turnout: 71.14% (▼2.36pp)
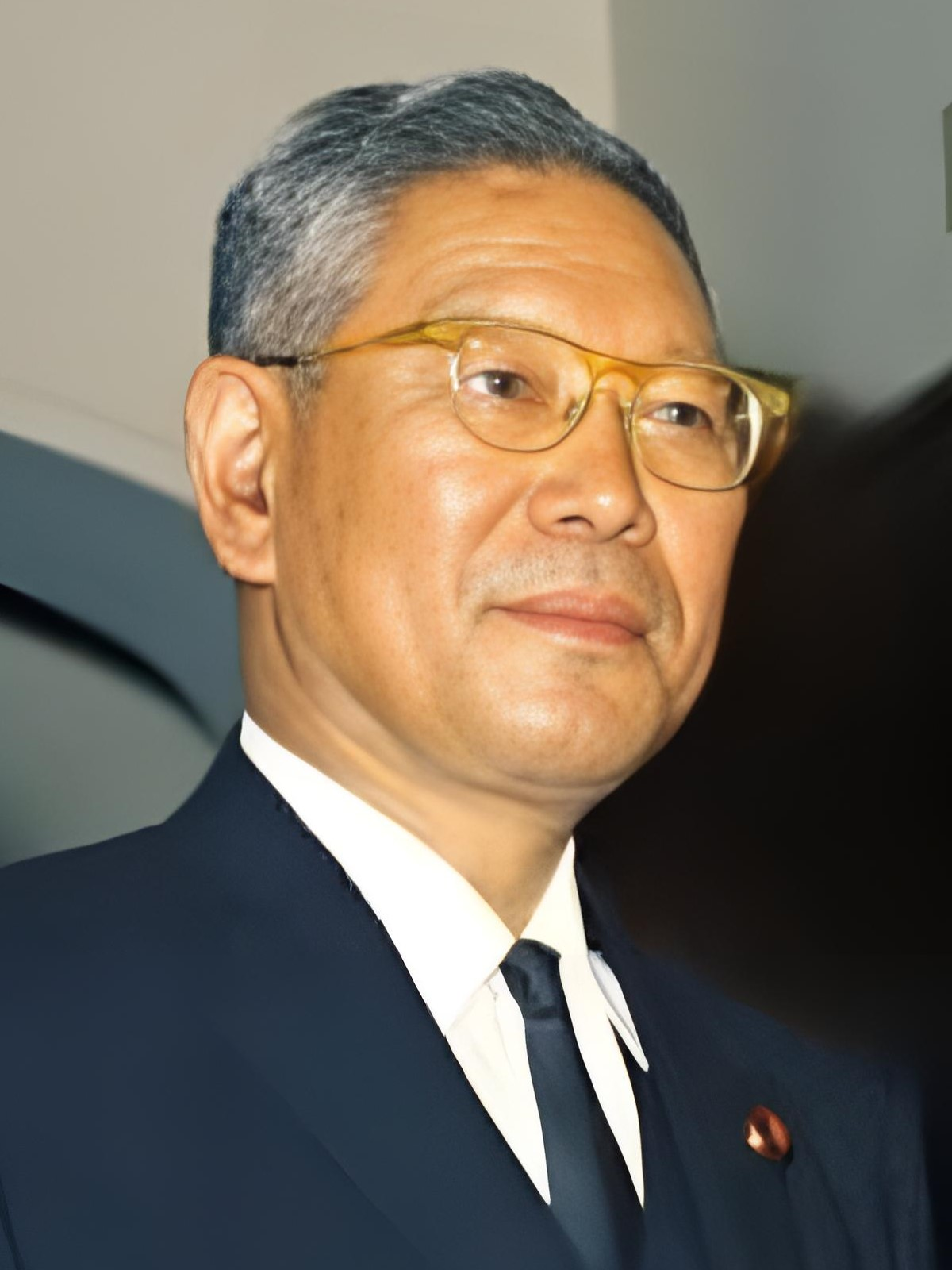

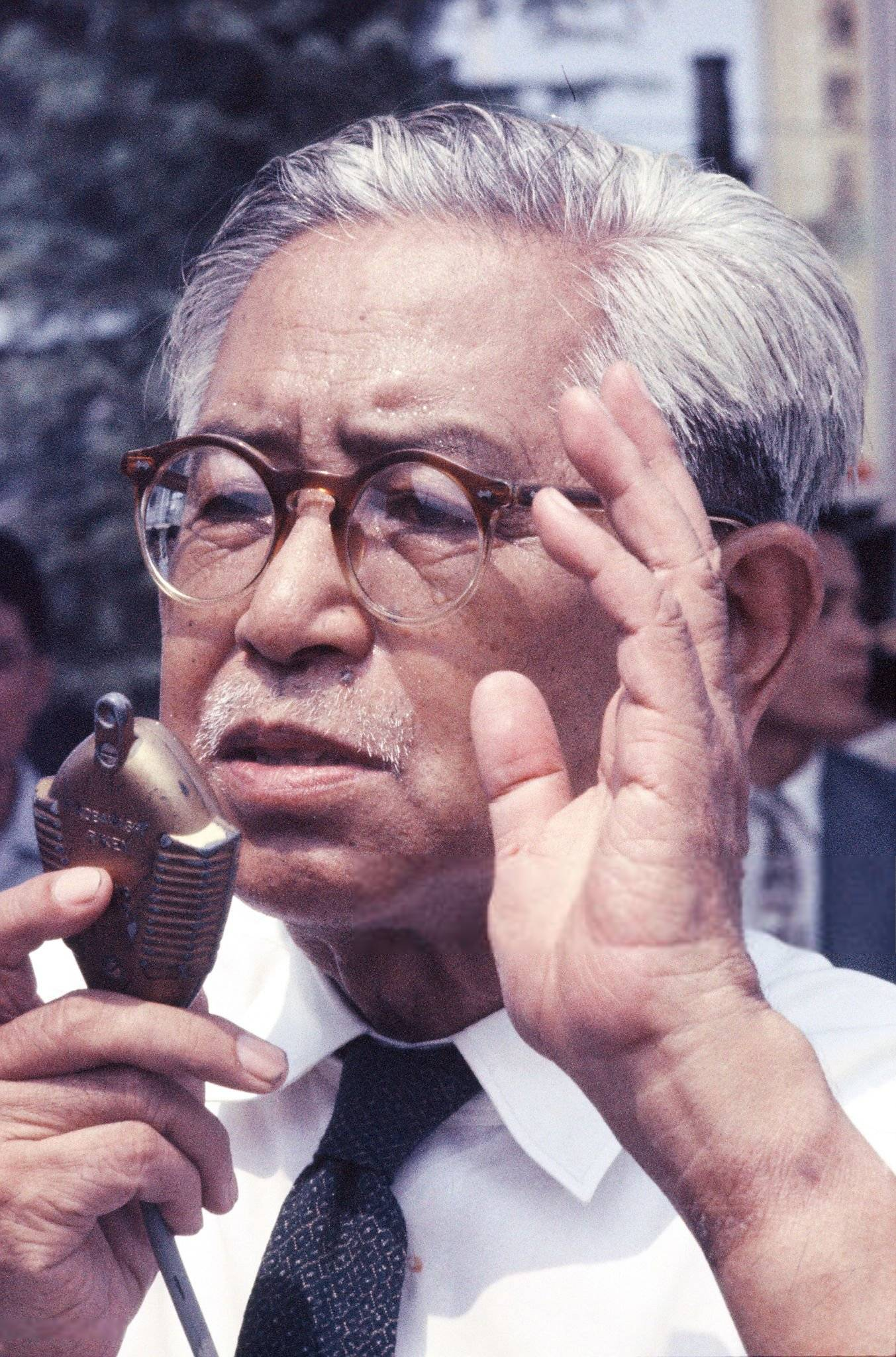

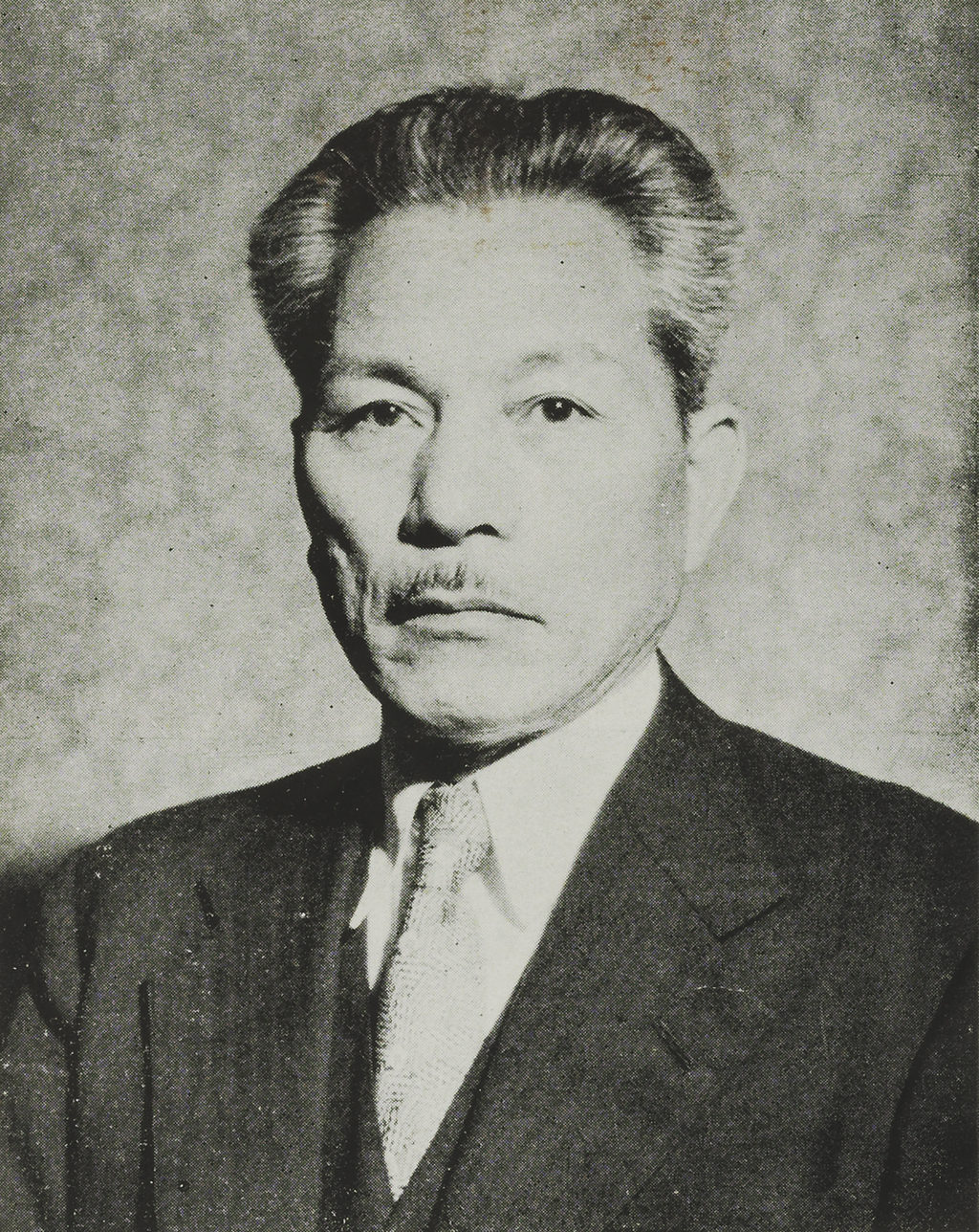

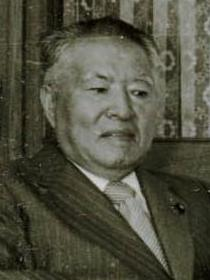
	First party	Second party
Leader	Hayato Ikeda	Jōtarō Kawakami
Party	LDP	Socialist
Last election	57.56%, 296 seats	27.56%, 145 seats
Seats won	283	144
Seat change	▼13	▼1
Popular vote	22,423,915	11,906,766
Percentage	54.67%	29.03%
Swing	▼2.89pp	▲1.53pp
	Third party	Fourth party
Leader	Suehiro Nishio	Kenji Miyamoto
Party	Democratic Socialist	JCP
Last election	8.77%, 17 seats	2.93%, 3 seats
Seats won	23	5
Seat change	▲6	▲2
Popular vote	3,023,302	1,646,477
Percentage	7.37%	4.01%
Swing	▼1.40pp	▲1.08pp
- Districts shaded according to winners' vote strength
Prime Minister before election
Hayato Ikeda
LDP
Elected Prime Minister
Hayato Ikeda
LDP

General elections were held in Japan on 21 November 1963. The result was a victory for the Liberal Democratic Party (LDP), which won 283 of the 467 seats. Voter turnout was 71.1%.

Most commentators believed that the election results would not radically alter the Japanese political landscape, and this was confirmed in the results, which did not see any party win or lose a large number of seats. Although the LDP lost 13 seats, 12 LDP-aligned independents were also elected. The highest gain in seats came from the Democratic Socialist Party (DSP), which tactically fielded far fewer candidates than the previous elections and concentrated on fewer districts, gaining six seats, which was more than any of the other opposition parties gained. The elections also saw the defeat of two former prime ministers: Tetsu Katayama of the DSP (formerly of the JSP) and Tanzan Ishibashi of the LDP.

== Results ==
Party	Votes	%	Seats	+/–
Liberal Democratic Party	22,423,915	54.67	283	−13
Japan Socialist Party	11,906,766	29.03	144	−1
Democratic Socialist Party	3,023,302	7.37	23	+6
Japanese Communist Party	1,646,477	4.01	5	+2
Other parties	59,765	0.15	0	–
Independents	1,956,313	4.77	12	+7
Total	41,016,538	100.00	467	0
Valid votes	41,016,538	98.93		
Invalid/blank votes	442,406	1.07		
Total votes	41,458,944	100.00		
Registered voters/turnout	58,281,678	71.14		
Source: Baerwald, Mackie

=== By prefecture ===
Prefecture	Total seats	Seats won				
Prefecture	Total seats	LDP	JSP	DSP	JCP	Ind.
Aichi	19	11	6	1	1	
Akita	8	4	3	1		
Aomori	7	3	3			1
Chiba	13	10	2	1		
Ehime	9	5	3	1		
Fukui	4	3	1			
Fukuoka	19	10	7	2		
Fukushima	12	9	3			
Gifu	9	6	3			
Gunma	10	7	3			
Hiroshima	12	9	2	1		
Hokkaido	22	10	9	1		2
Hyōgo	18	8	6	3		1
Ibaraki	12	8	3			1
Ishikawa	6	4	1			1
Iwate	8	6	2			
Kagawa	6	4	1			1
Kagoshima	11	6	4			1
Kanagawa	13	7	5	1		
Kōchi	5	4	1			
Kumamoto	10	8	2			
Kyoto	10	4	3	2	1	
Mie	9	6	2			1
Miyagi	9	5	3	1		
Miyazaki	6	4	2			
Nagano	13	8	4		1	
Nagasaki	9	6	2			1
Nara	5	3	2			
Niigata	15	9	5			1
Ōita	7	5	2			
Okayama	10	6	4			
Osaka	19	8	6	3	2	
Saga	5	3	2			
Saitama	13	8	5			
Shiga	5	3	2			
Shimane	5	4	1			
Shizuoka	14	9	4	1		
Tochigi	10	7	3			
Tokushima	5	4				1
Tokyo	27	13	12	2		
Tottori	4	3	1			
Toyama	6	5	1			
Wakayama	6	4	2			
Yamagata	8	6	2			
Yamaguchi	9	4	3	2		
Yamanashi	5	4	1			
Total	467	283	144	23	5	12
