= Akira Mikazuki =

Japanese politician (1921–2010)

- 三ヶ月 章
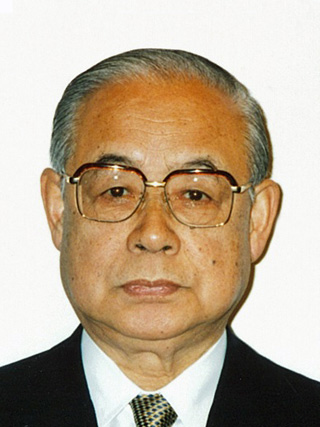

Minister of Justice
- In office 9 August 1993 – 28 April 1994
- Prime Minister: Morihiro Hosokawa
- Preceded by: Masaharu Gotōda
- Succeeded by: Shigeto Nagano

Personal details
- Born: 20 June 1921 Hamada, Shimane, Japan
- Died: 14 November 2010 (aged 89)
- Party: Independent
- Education: University of Tokyo

Akira Mikazuki (三ヶ月 章, Mikazuki Akira; 20 June 1921 – 14 November 2010) was a Japanese politician who served as the Minister of Justice and Professor Emeritus at the University of Tokyo. He was a leading figure in civil procedure scholarship.

== Career ==
Mikazuki was an attorney and law professor. He was a member of the Arbitration Law Study Group who drafted the arbitration law in 1989.

He was appointed Minister of Justice under the non-Liberal Democratic Party Hosokawa Cabinet, although he was not a politician. He replaced Masaharu Gotoda as justice minister. He was in office from 9 August 1993 to 28 April 1994. His successor was Shigeto Nagano.

Mikazuki reported that anyone who had plans to abolish capital punishment could not accept an appointment as justice minister. He approved executions for four death row inmates and believed in the deterrent effect of capital punishment. Four executions were carried out during his term in Autumn 1993. He retired from politics in November 2010.

== Death ==
Mikazuki died on 14 November 2010, at the age of 89.

== Awards ==
Mikazuki received the Order of Culture award in Tokyo on 7 November 2007. He was also recipient of the following national awards: Medal with Purple Ribbon (1981), Order of the Sacred Treasure (1995; First Class), and Person of Cultural Merit (2005). He was awarded the Order of Merit of the Federal Republic of Germany in 1990.
