= 1960 Japanese general election =

- 20 November 1960

All 467 seats in the House of Representatives 234 seats needed for a majority
- Turnout: 73.50% (▼3.48pp)
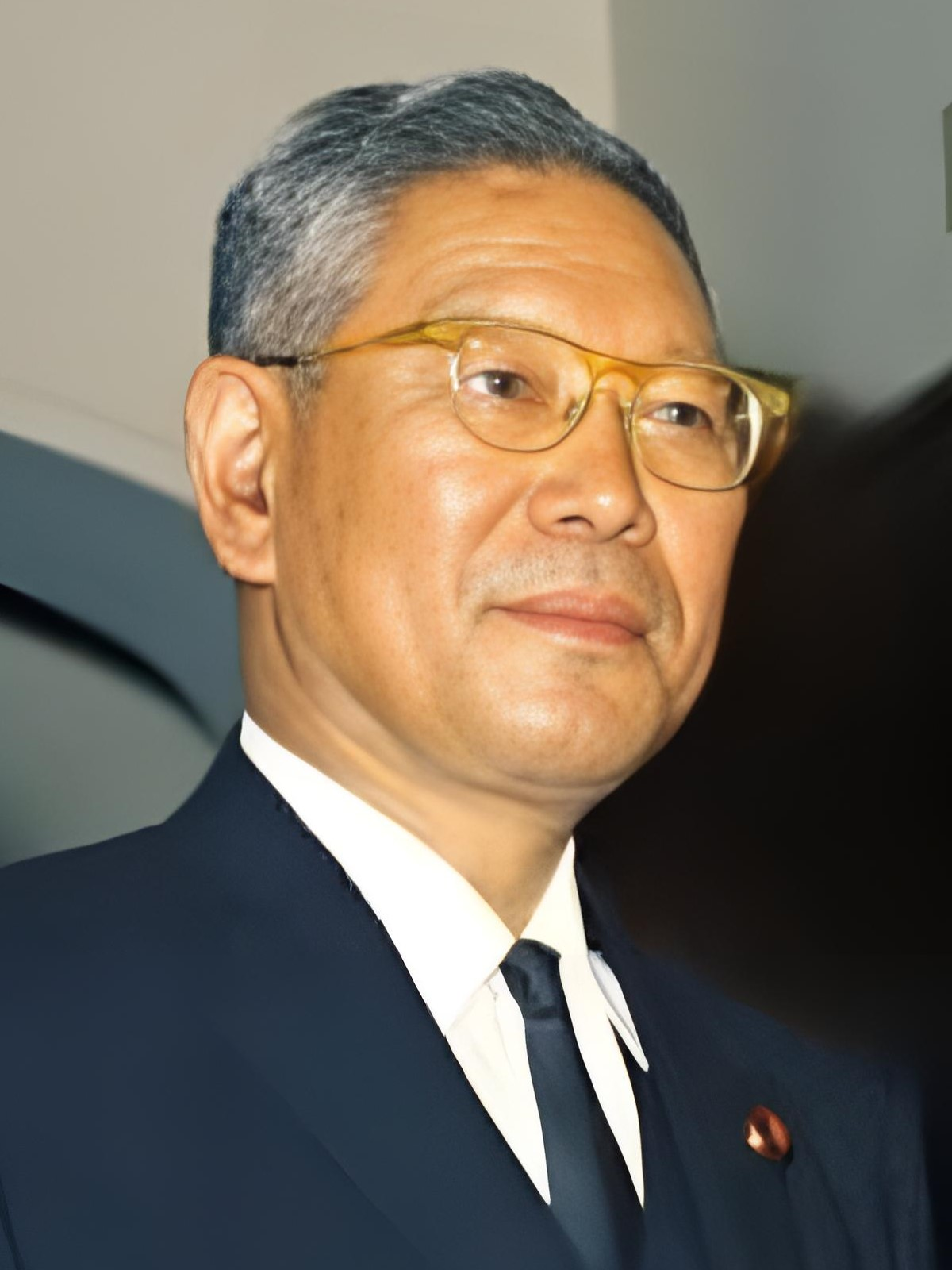

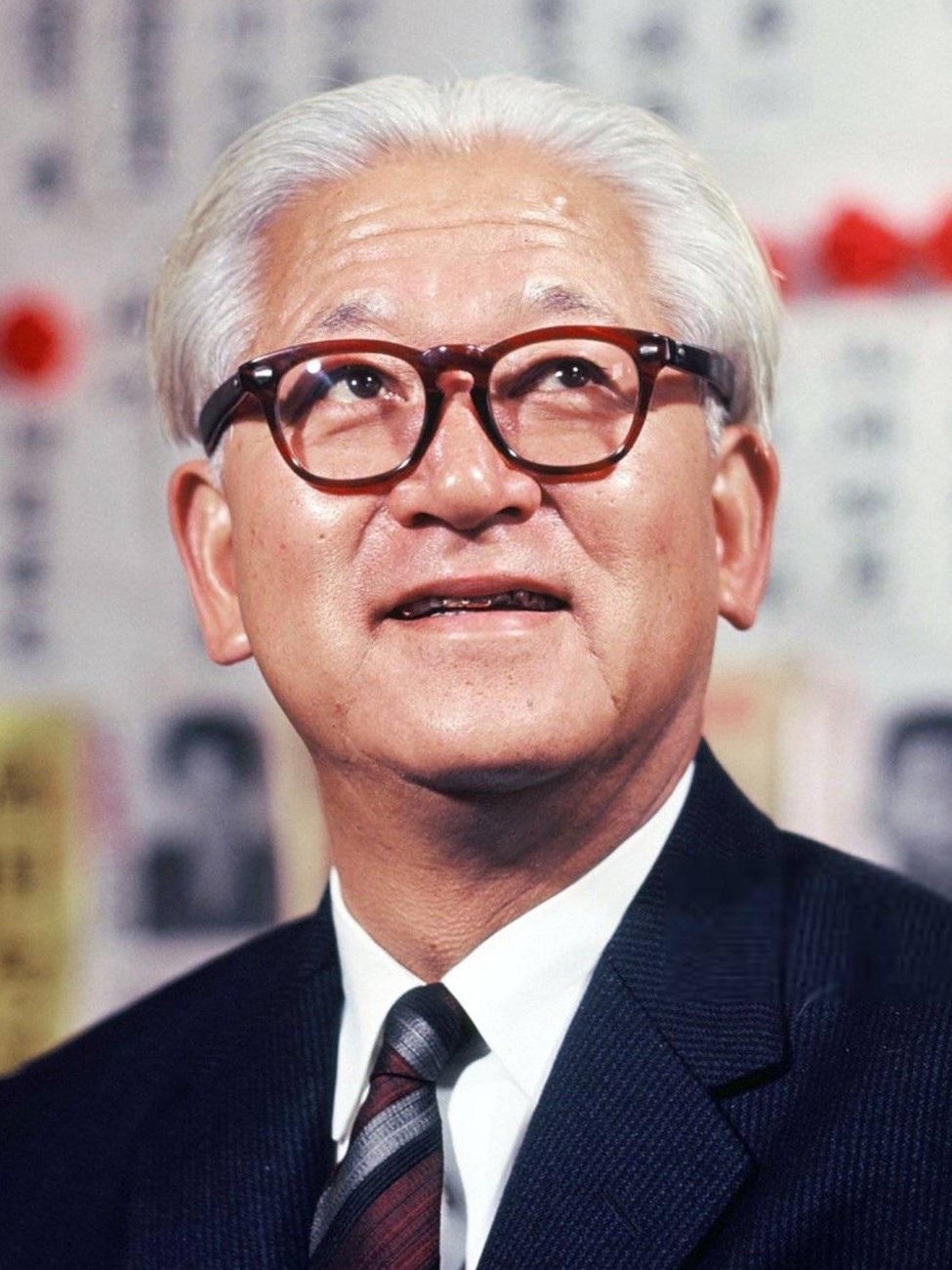

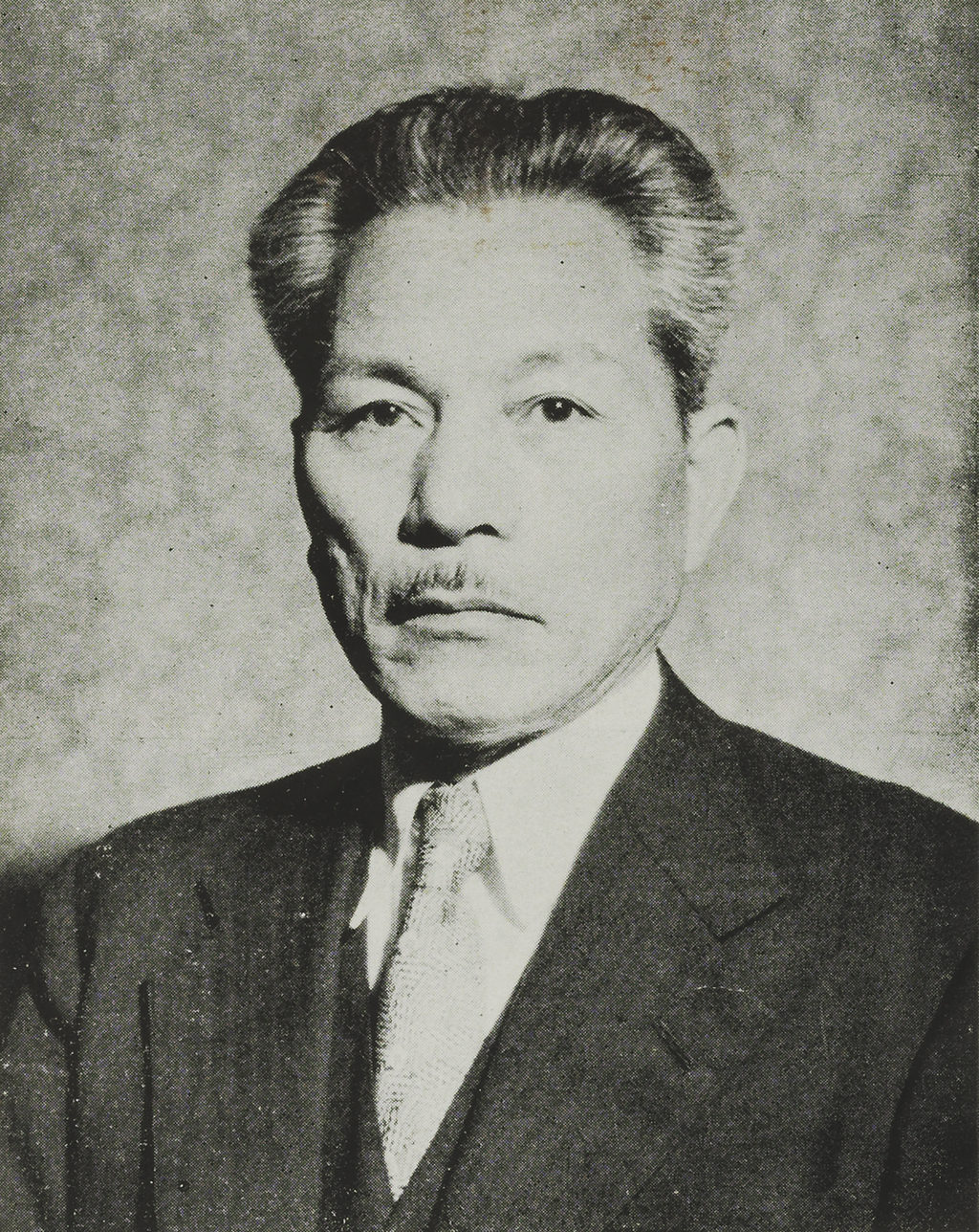

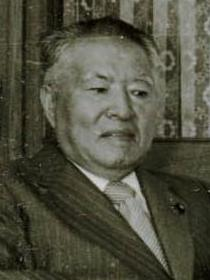
	First party	Second party
Leader	Hayato Ikeda	Saburō Eda (replacing Inejirō Asanuma †)
Party	LDP	Socialist
Last election	57.80%, 287 seats	32.94%, 166 seats
Seats won	296	145
Seat change	▲9	▼21
Popular vote	22,740,272	10,887,134
Percentage	57.56%	27.56%
Swing	▼0.24pp	▼5.88pp
	Third party	Fourth party
Leader	Suehiro Nishio	Kenji Miyamoto
Party	Democratic Socialist	JCP
Last election	Did not exist	2.55%, 1 seat
Seats won	17	3
Seat change	New	▲2
Popular vote	3,464,148	1,156,723
Percentage	8.77%	2.93%
Swing	New	▲0.38pp
- Districts shaded according to winners' vote strength
Prime Minister before election
Hayato Ikeda
LDP
Elected Prime Minister
Hayato Ikeda
LDP

General elections were held in Japan on 20 November 1960. The result was a victory for the Liberal Democratic Party, which won 296 of the 467 seats. Voter turnout was 73.5%, the lowest since the 1947 general elections.

== Background ==
The elections came near the end of a turbulent year marked by violent labour disputes at Mitsui Miike Coal Mine, the "May 19th Incident" in which Nobusuke Kishi and LDP lawmakers in the Diet forced the revised US-Japan Security Treaty through parliament (causing an upsurge in the Anpo protests), and the assassination of Japan Socialist Party (JSP) leader Inejirō Asanuma by wakizashi-wielding right-wing youth named Otoya Yamaguchi. Prior to the elections there were a number of left-wing street protests and right-wing vigilante actions.

== Campaign ==
As public antipathy was largely towards Kishi and his cabinet, rather than flagship LDP policies, the election was not a setback for the party. Kishi's successor, Hayato Ikeda, was popular for his moderate attitude and public image as a practical finance minister, and LDP candidates focused heavily on issues such as maintaining already-strong economic growth. Ikeda made a splash with his promise to double the national income in ten years, known as the "Income Doubling Plan," which also promised economic benefits such as tax cuts to small businesses, farmers, and consumers.

The LDP also benefitted from factionalism in the JSP, as the more moderate and anti-communist Democratic Socialist Party seceded from the JSP at the beginning of the year, leading to a spoiler effect.

== Results ==
Although the LDP saw a small reduction in its vote share compared to the 1958 elections and the JSP and DSP collectively received around 1.3 million more votes than the united JSP did in the 1958 elections, the LDP gained nine seats, while the JSP and DSP lost a net four seats.

Party	Votes	%	Seats	+/–
Liberal Democratic Party	22,740,272	57.56	296	+9
Japan Socialist Party	10,887,134	27.56	145	−21
Democratic Socialist Party	3,464,148	8.77	17	New
Japanese Communist Party	1,156,723	2.93	3	+2
Other parties	141,941	0.36	1	–
Independents	1,118,905	2.83	5	−7
Total	39,509,123	100.00	467	0
Valid votes	39,509,123	98.97		
Invalid/blank votes	410,996	1.03		
Total votes	39,920,119	100.00		
Registered voters/turnout	54,312,993	73.50		
Source: Baerwald, Mackie

=== By prefecture ===
Prefecture	Total seats	Seats won					
Prefecture	Total seats	LDP	JSP	DSP	JCP	Others	Ind.
Aichi	19	12	6	1			
Akita	8	5	3				
Aomori	7	6	1				
Chiba	13	10	3				
Ehime	9	7	2				
Fukui	4	3	1				
Fukuoka	19	10	7	2			
Fukushima	12	7	4	1			
Gifu	9	5	3				1
Gunma	10	6	4				
Hiroshima	12	8	3	1			
Hokkaido	22	12	10				
Hyōgo	18	10	6	1			1
Ibaraki	12	9	3				
Ishikawa	6	5	1				
Iwate	8	6	2				
Kagawa	6	4	1				1
Kagoshima	11	9	2				
Kanagawa	13	8	3	2			
Kōchi	5	4	1				
Kumamoto	10	7	3				
Kyoto	10	4	3	2	1		
Mie	9	5	2	1			1
Miyagi	9	6	3				
Miyazaki	6	4	2				
Nagano	13	8	5				
Nagasaki	9	6	3				
Nara	5	4	1				
Niigata	15	8	7				
Ōita	7	5	2				
Okayama	10	7	3				
Osaka	19	7	7	3	2		
Saga	5	3	1			1	
Saitama	13	8	4	1			
Shiga	5	2	2				1
Shimane	5	4	1				
Shizuoka	14	10	4				
Tochigi	10	6	4				
Tokushima	5	4	1				
Tokyo	27	15	11	1			
Tottori	4	3	1				
Toyama	6	4	2				
Wakayama	6	4	2				
Yamagata	8	6	2				
Yamaguchi	9	6	2	1			
Yamanashi	5	4	1				
Total	467	296	145	17	3	1	5
