= List of ambassadors of Japan to Uruguay =

The List of Japanese ambassadors to Uruguay started when Ōkuma Nobuyuki presented his credentials to the Uruguayan government in 1953.

Japan and Uruguay established diplomatic relations in 1921, but it was not until 1952 that a Japanese legation was opened in Montevideo.

== List ==
This is a chronological list of Japanese diplomats.

Inaugural date	Official position (Japanese)	Official position	Name (Japanese)	Name
May 24, 1953	臨時代理公使	Chargé d'affaires ad interim	大隈 信幸	Ōkuma Nobuyuki
April 26, 1957	特命全権公使	Minister Plenipotentiary	大隈 信幸	Ōkuma Nobuyuki
April 9, 1959	臨時代理公使	Chargé d'affaires ad interim	伊達 邦美	Tate Kuniyoshi
June 3,1959	特命全権公使	Minister Plenipotentiary	粕谷 孝夫	Kasuya Yoshio
April 29, 1961	臨時代理公使	Chargé d'affaires ad interim	土屋 南夫	Tsuchiya Minao
October 16, 1961	特命全権大使	Ambassador	高橋 明	Takahashi Akira
November 6, 1965	臨時代理大使	Chargé d'affaires ad interim	尾戸 長春	Odo Nagaharu
January 28, 1966	特命全権大使	Ambassador	都村 新次郎	Tsumura Shinjirō
March 5, 1969	臨時代理大使	Chargé d'affaires ad interim	兼田 晴重	Kaneda Harushige
April 19, 1969	特命全権大使	Ambassador	林 馨	Hayashi Kaoru
January 3, 1971	臨時代理大使	Chargé d'affaires ad interim	兼田 晴重	Kaneda Harushige
February 13, 1971	臨時代理大使	Chargé d'affaires ad interim	増沢 幸三郎	Masuzawa Kozaburō
February 24, 1971	特命全権大使	Ambassador	大城 斉敏	Ōshiro Seibin
March 30, 1973	臨時代理大使	Chargé d'affaires ad interim	増沢 幸三郎	Masuzawa Kozaburō
May 19, 1973	特命全権大使	Ambassador	近藤 四郎	Kondō Shirō
October 3, 1975	臨時代理大使	Chargé d'affaires ad interim	永田 庸夫	Nagada Tsuneo
June 17, 1976	特命全権大使	Ambassador	小室 和秀	Komurō Kazuhide
June 20, 1978	臨時代理大使	Chargé d'affaires ad interim	永田 庸夫	Nagada Tsuneo
December 29, 1978	特命全権大使	Ambassador	椋本 伊三郎	Mukumoto Isaburō
May 18, 1982	臨時代理大使	Chargé d'affaires ad interim	野口 辰夫	Noguchi Tatsuo
June 2, 1982	特命全権大使	Ambassador	平野 文夫	Hirano Fumio
January 24, 1986	臨時代理大使	Chargé d'affaires ad interim	青木 肇	Aoki Hajime
March 10, 1986	特命全権大使	Ambassador	赤松 良子	Akamatsu Ryōko
January 16, 1989	臨時代理大使	Chargé d'affaires ad interim	永井 慎也	Nagai Shinya
March 9, 1989	特命全権大使	Ambassador	広岡欣之助	Hirooka Kinnosuke

== See also ==
- Japan–Uruguay relations
- Diplomatic rank
