= Non-LDP and non-JCP coalition =

Terms used in Japanese politics

Non-LDP and non-JCP Coalition (非自民・非共産連立政権) are terms used in Japanese politics and mean building an alliance between moderate parties excluding conservative Liberal Democratic Party (LDP) and left-wing Japanese Communist Party (JCP). It is mainly used only when major political parties in Japan, except for LDP and JCP, form a big tent coalition. Hosokawa Cabinet and Hata Cabinet belong to the representative "Non-LDP and non-JCP Coalition".

In general, JCP forms some power in the region, but there is no experience in power in the central politics itself. Therefore, the term "non-LDP and non-JCP Coalition" in Japan's central politics is close to meaning that it will exclude JCP from the liberal alliance to oppose the LDP's nationalist project, but will not compromise with the large conservative party, LDP. In fact, the LDP is considered the most conservative and the JCP is considered the most progressive in the Japanese political spectrum.

== See also ==
- Hosokawa Cabinet
- Hata Cabinet
- Political moderate
- Liberalism in Japan
- Pentapartito
- Third Force (France)
- Weimar Coalition
