= 1971 Japanese House of Councillors election =

- 27 June 1971

125 of the 251 seats in the House of Councillors 125 seats needed for a majority
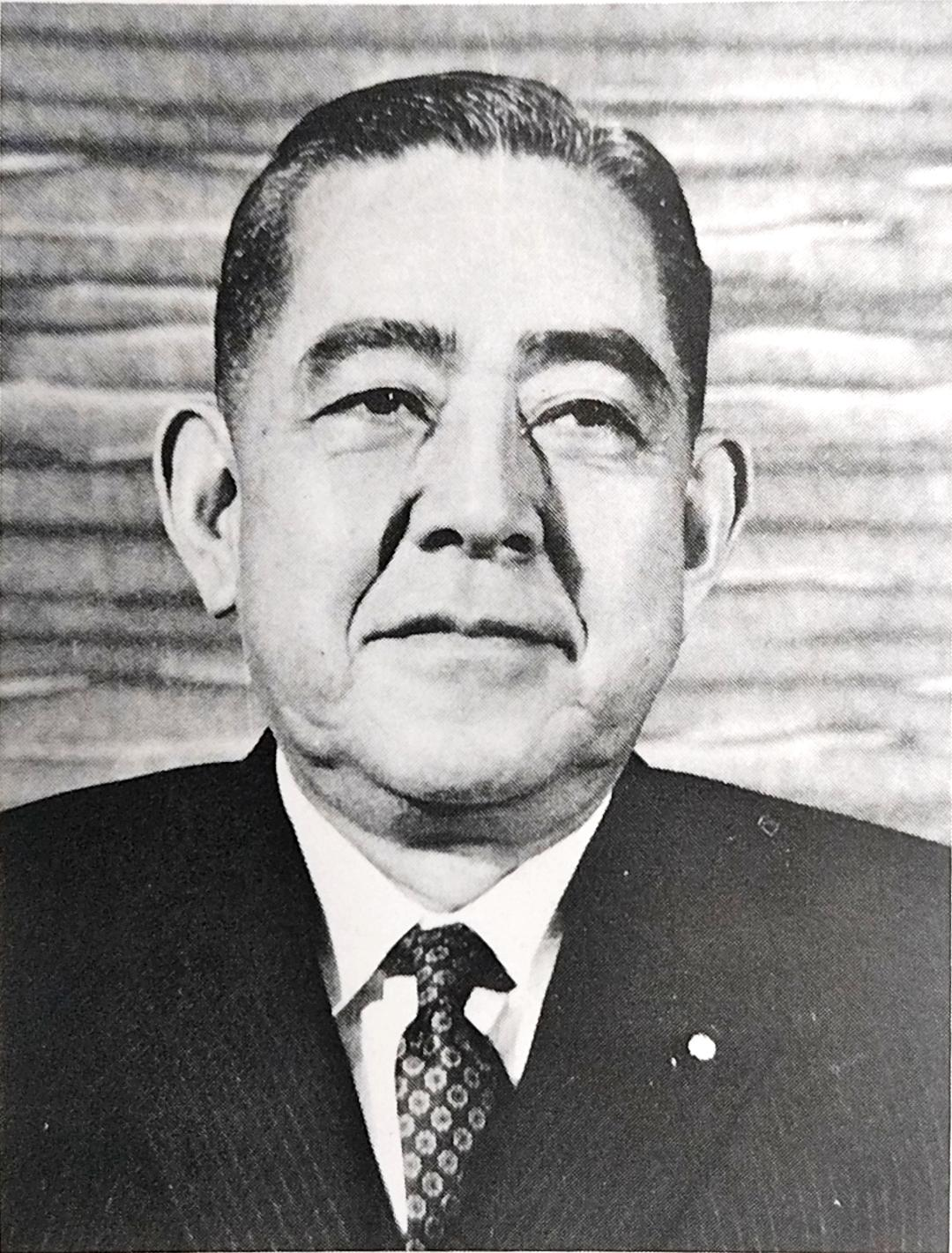

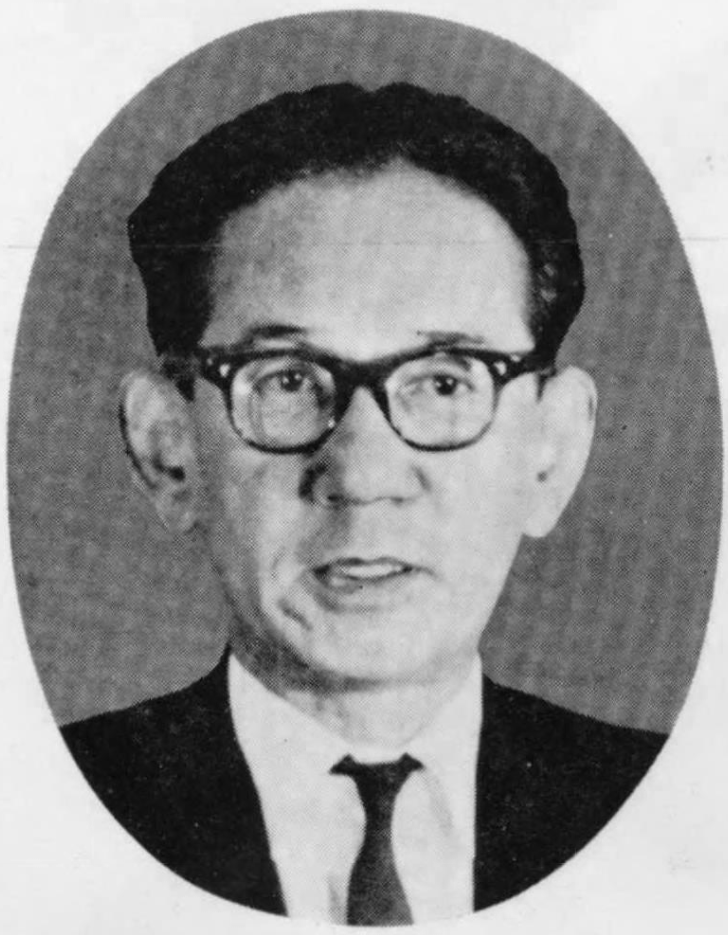

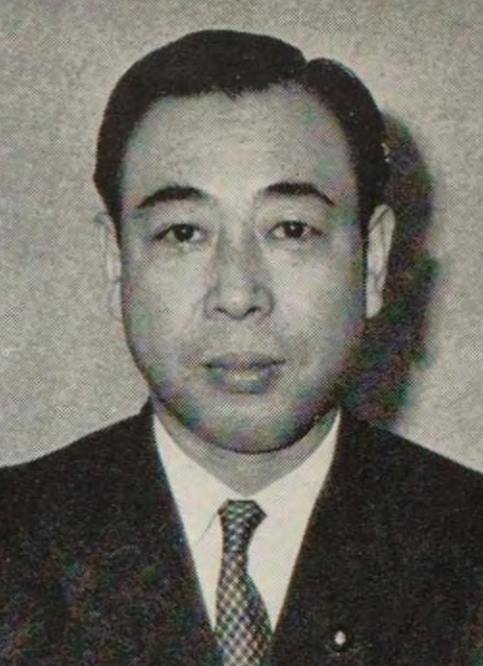

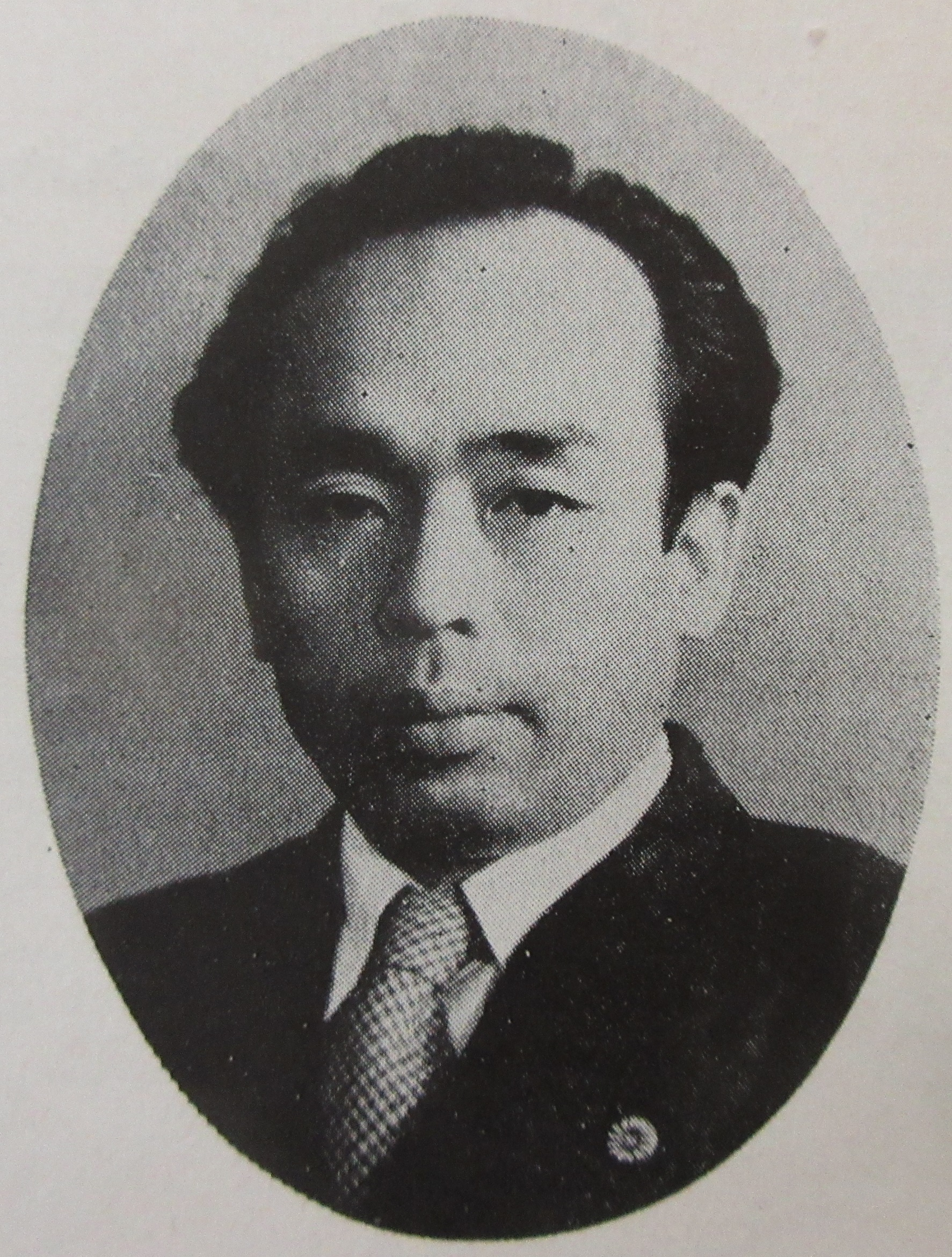
	First party	Second party	Third party
Leader	Eisaku Satō	Tomomi Narita	Yoshikatsu Takeiri
Party	LDP	Socialist	Kōmeitō
Seats after	134	66	23
Seat change	▼3	▲1	▼1
Popular vote	17,759,395	8,494,264	5,626,293
Percentage	44.5%	21.3%	14.1%
Swing	▼2.2%	▲2.5%	▼1.4%
	Fourth party	Fifth party
Leader	Kasuga Ikkō	Kenji Miyamoto
Party	Democratic Socialist	JCP
Seats after	13	10
Seat change	▲3	▲3
Popular vote	2,441,509	3,219,307
Percentage	6.1%	8.1%
Swing	▲0.1%	▲3.1%
- Results of the election, showing the winning candidates in each prefecture and the national block.
President of the House of Councillors before election
Ken Yasui
LDP
President of the House of Councillors-designate
Yasoichi Mori
LDP

House of Councillors elections were held in Japan on 27 June 1971, electing half the seats in the House. The Liberal Democratic Party won the most seats.

== Results ==
Party	National			Constituency			Seats			
Party	Votes	%	Seats	Votes	%	Seats	Not up	Won	Total after	+/–
Liberal Democratic Party	17,759,395	44.47	21	17,727,263	43.95	41	72	62	134	–3
Japan Socialist Party	8,494,264	21.27	11	12,597,644	31.24	28	27	39	66	+1
Komeitō	5,626,293	14.09	8	1,391,855	3.45	2	13	10	23	–1
Japanese Communist Party	3,219,307	8.06	5	4,878,570	12.10	1	4	6	10	+3
Democratic Socialist Party	2,441,509	6.11	4	1,919,643	4.76	2	7	6	13	+3
Other parties	48,300	0.12	0	74,739	0.19	0	0	0	0	0
Independents	2,342,517	5.87	1	1,741,201	4.32	1	3	2	5	–2
Total	39,931,585	100.00	50	40,330,915	100.00	75	126	125	251	+1
Valid votes	39,931,585	94.71		40,330,915	95.65					
Invalid/blank votes	2,229,158	5.29		1,833,100	4.35					
Total votes	42,160,743	100.00		42,164,015	100.00					
Registered voters/turnout	71,177,667	59.23		71,177,667	59.24					
Source: Ministry of Internal Affairs and Communications, National Diet

=== By constituency ===
Constituency	Total seats	Seats won					
Constituency	Total seats	LDP	JSP	Kōmeitō	DSP	JCP	Ind.
Aichi	3	2	1				
Akita	1		1				
Aomori	1	1					
Chiba	2	1	1				
Ehime	1	1					
Fukui	1		1				
Fukuoka	3	2	1				
Fukushima	2	1	1				
Gifu	1		1				
Gunma	2	1	1				
Hiroshima	2	1	1				
Hokkaido	4	2	2				
Hyōgo	3	1	1		1		
Ibaraki	2	2					
Ishikawa	1	1					
Iwate	1	1					
Kagawa	1		1				
Kagoshima	2	1	1				
Kanagawa	2	1	1				
Kōchi	1	1					
Kumamoto	2	1	1				
Kyoto	2	1	1				
Mie	1	1					
Miyagi	1		1				
Miyazaki	1	1					
Nagano	2	1	1				
Nagasaki	1	1					
Nara	1	1					
Niigata	2	1	1				
Ōita	1		1				
Okinawa	1	1					
Okayama	2	1	1				
Osaka	3	1	1	1			
Saga	1	1					
Saitama	2	1	1				
Shiga	1	1					
Shimane	1		1				
Shizuoka	2	1	1				
Tochigi	2	1	1				
Tokushima	1						1
Tokyo	4	1		1	1	1	
Tottori	1	1					
Toyama	1	1					
Wakayama	1	1					
Yamagata	1	1					
Yamaguchi	1	1					
Yamanashi	1		1				
National	50	21	11	8	4	5	1
Total	126	63	39	10	6	6	2
