= Kasuga Ikkō =

Japanese politician (1910–1989)

- 春日 一幸
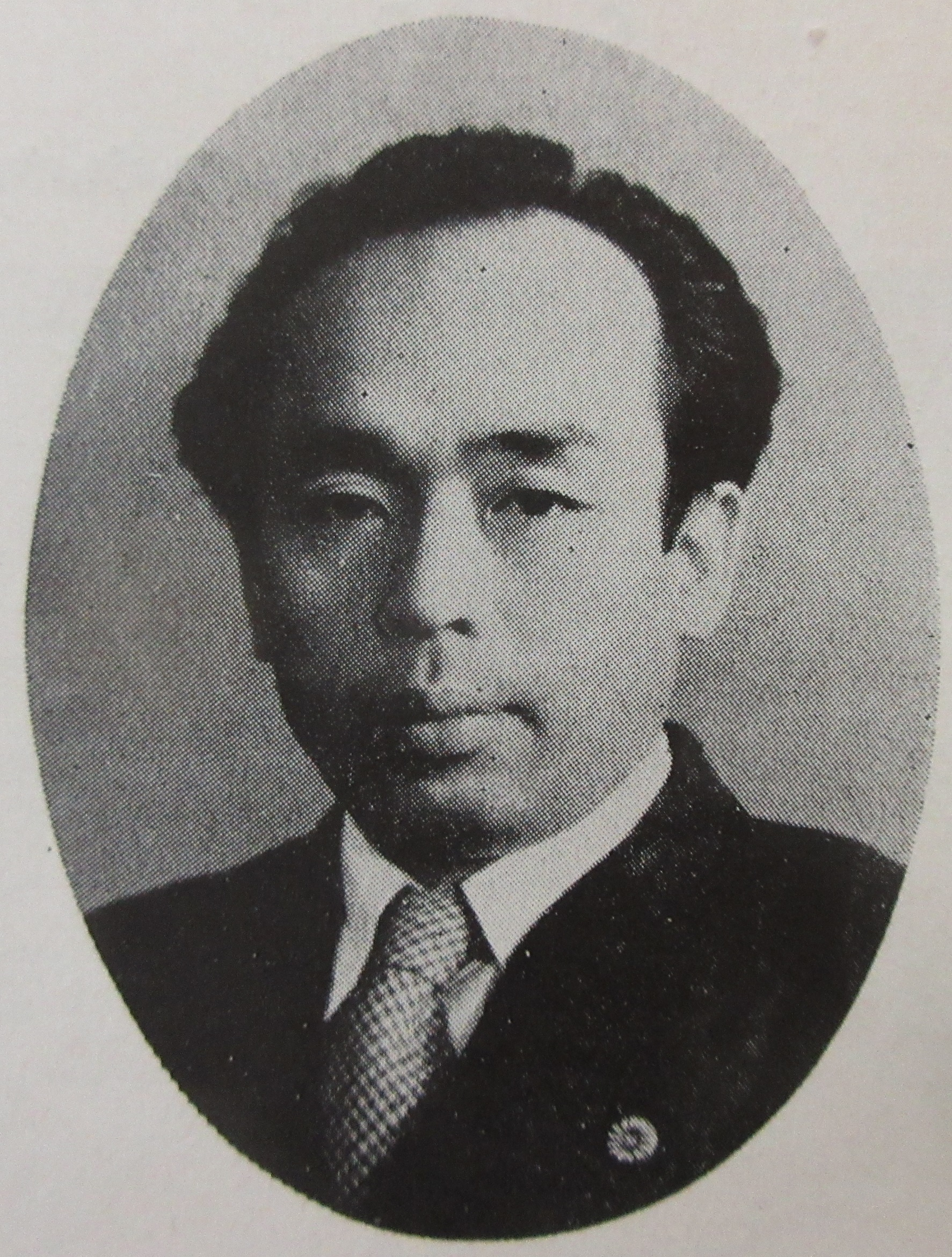
- c. 1953

Chairman of the Democratic Socialist Party
- In office 27 April 1971 – 28 November 1977
- Preceded by: Eiichi Nishimura
- Succeeded by: Ryōsaku Sasaki

Member of the House of Representatives
- In office 2 October 1952 – 2 May 1989
- Preceded by: Hide Tajima
- Succeeded by: Taisuke Sato
- Constituency: Aichi 1st

Member of the Aichi Prefectural Assembly
- In office 30 April 1947 – 5 September 1952
- Constituency: Nagoya City Nakamura Ward

Personal details
- Born: 25 March 1910 Kaizu, Gifu, Japan
- Died: 2 May 1989 (aged 79) Mizuho, Nagoya, Japan
- Party: Democratic Socialist
- Other political affiliations: JSP (1947–1952; 1955–1960); RSP (1952–1955)

Kasuga Ikkō (Japanese: 春日 一幸; 25 March 1910 – 2 May 1989) was a Japanese politician who served as Chairman of the Democratic Socialist Party of Japan from 1971 to 1977, and as a Representative from Aichi from 1952 until his death in 1989.

Ikkō was born in a village in Kaizu, where he grew up in a farming family alongside several sisters. He enrolled in the Nagoya Higher Technical School, and graduated in 1928.

== Political career ==
Ikkō was spurred on by the postwar conditions of Japan, and attempted to run for a City Council seat in Nagoya and a seat in the Prefecture Assembly in Aichi, both under the Japanese Socialist Party. He lost his race in the City Council, but won his seat in the Prefectural Assembly. In 1952, he ran for the House of Representatives, and was successfully elected in Aichi as a member of the Right Socialist Party.

=== Formation and Chairmanship of the Democratic Socialist Party ===
Due to differences in beliefs with the JSP, he and a few other members of the party defected to form the Democratic Socialist Party of Japan in 1960, and he became chairman of the party's Diet Affairs Committee. In June 1967, he became the party's general secretary, and then was promoted to vice chairman in February 1969. After the unexpected death of Chairman Eiichi Nishimura, he was elected chairman of the party. He then led the party through the general elections of 1972 and 1976, but resigned in 1977.

Despite his resignation, he remained influential within the party, and became a standing advisor inside of it. He also continued to hold his House seat until his death on May 2, 1989, inside of the Nagoya City University Hospital due to pneumonia.
