= Keigo Ōuchi =

Japanese politician (1930–2016)

- 大内 啓伍
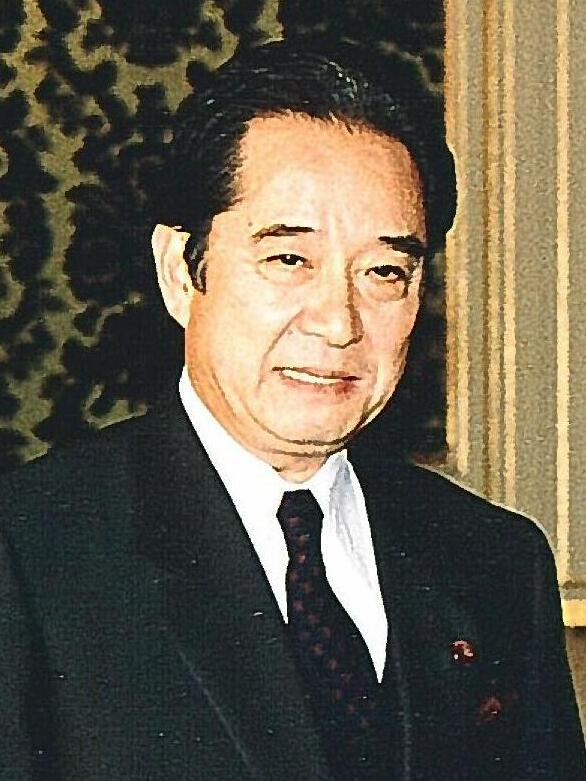
- Ōuchi in 1992

Minister of Health and Welfare
- In office 9 August 1993 – 30 June 1994
- Prime Minister: Morihiro Hosokawa; Tsutomu Hata
- Preceded by: Yuya Niwa
- Succeeded by: Shōichi Ide

Chairman of the Democratic Socialist Party
- In office 10 April 1990 – 8 June 1994
- Preceded by: Eiichi Nagasue
- Succeeded by: Takashi Yonezawa

Member of the House of Representatives
- In office 18 February 1990 – 27 September 1996
- Preceded by: Masuhide Okazaki
- Succeeded by: Constituency abolished
- Constituency: Tokyo 2nd
- In office 10 December 1976 – 2 June 1986
- Preceded by: Itaru Yonehara
- Succeeded by: Arai Shōkei
- Constituency: Tokyo 2nd

Personal details
- Born: 23 January 1930 Tokyo, Japan
- Died: 9 March 2016 (aged 86) Ōta, Tokyo, Japan
- Party: Democratic Socialist (1960–1994)
- Other political affiliations: RSP (1953–1955); JSP (1955–1960); LL (1994–1995); LDP (1995–2000)
- Education: Waseda University

Keigo Ōuchi (大内 啓伍, Ōuchi Keigo; 23 January 1930 – 9 March 2016) was a Japanese politician who served as chairman of the Democratic Socialist Party from 1990 to 1994.

He led the Democratic Socialist Party into the 1993 Japanese general election. He was Minister of Health and Welfare in the Hosokawa Cabinet and Hata Cabinet. When his party merged into the New Frontier Party in 1994, Ōuchi declined to join. He instead formed the Liberal League with other independents. He joined the Liberal Democratic Party the following year.

Ōuchi died of pneumonia in Tokyo on 9 March 2016, at the age of 86.
