= Ryōko Akamatsu =

Japanese politician (1929–2024)

- 赤松 良子
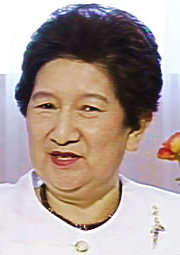
- Akamatsu in 1993

Minister of Education
- In office 9 August 1993 – 30 June 1994
- Prime Minister: Morihiro Hosokawa; Tsutomu Hata
- Preceded by: Mayumi Moriyama
- Succeeded by: Kaoru Yosano

Personal details
- Born: 24 August 1929 Osaka, Japan
- Died: 7 February 2024 (aged 94)
- Party: Independent
- Education: Tsuda College; University of Tokyo

Ryōko Akamatsu (Japanese: 赤松 良子, Hepburn: Akamatsu Ryōko; 24 August 1929 – 7 February 2024) was a Japanese politician. She was Minister of Education in the Hata Cabinet and Hosokawa Cabinet. She was ambassador of Japan to Uruguay from 1986 to 1989.

Akamatsu died on 7 February 2024, at the age of 94.
