= Suehiro Nishio =

Japanese labor activist and politician

- 西尾 末広
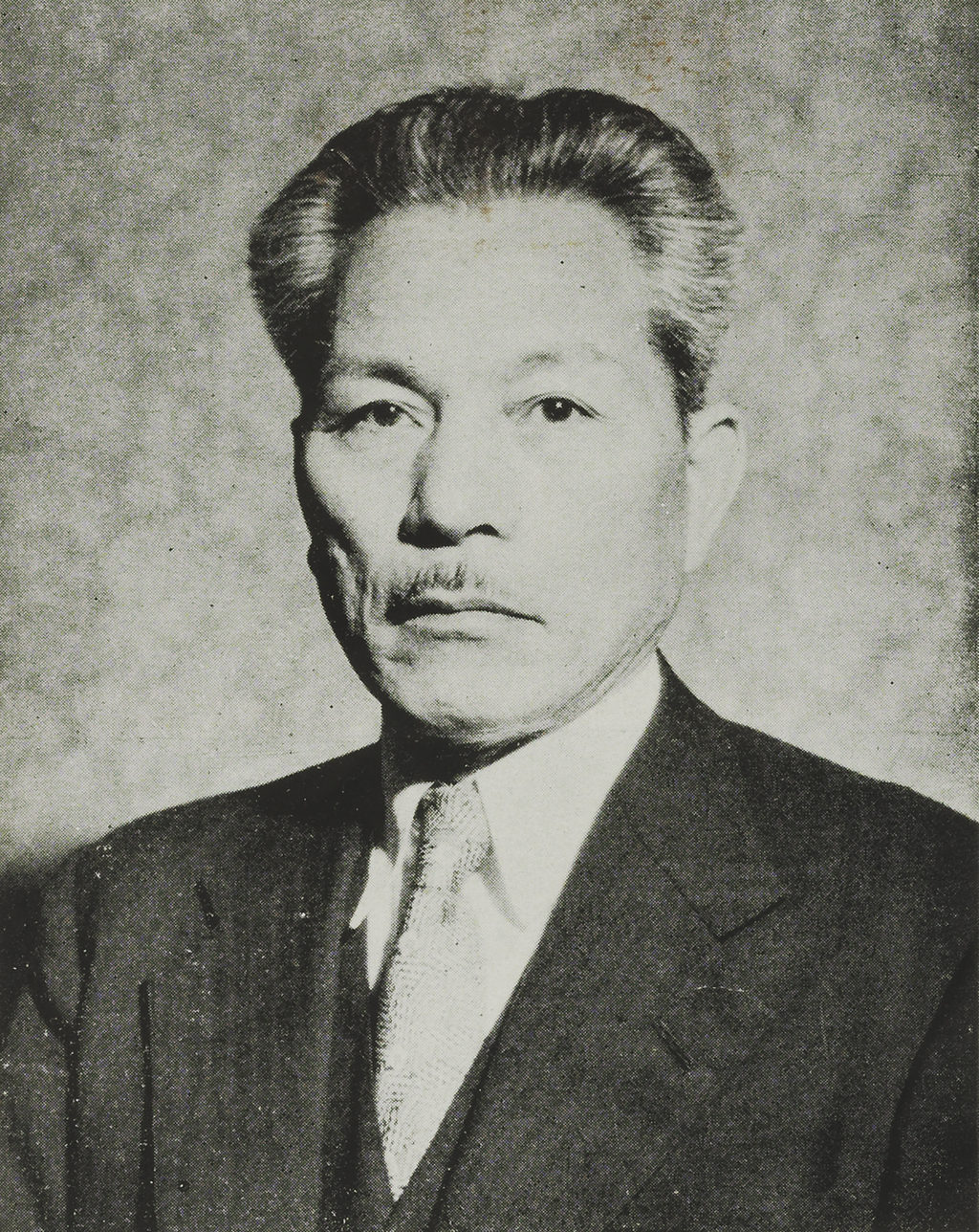
- Nishio in 1951

Deputy Prime Minister of Japan
- In office 10 March 1948 – 6 July 1948
- Prime Minister: Hitoshi Ashida
- Preceded by: Hitoshi Ashida
- Succeeded by: Jōji Hayashi

Chief Cabinet Secretary
- In office 1 June 1947 – 10 March 1948
- Prime Minister: Tetsu Katayama
- Preceded by: Jōji Hayashi
- Succeeded by: Gizō Tomabechi
Party political offices
Chairman of the Democratic Socialist Party
In office 24 January 1960 – June 1967
Preceded by	Position established
Succeeded by	Eiichi Nishimura
Secretary General of the Japan Socialist Party
In office 1946 – January 1948
Chairman	Tetsu Katayama
Preceded by	Tetsu Katayama
Succeeded by	Inejirō Asanuma

Member of the House of Representatives
- In office 2 October 1952 – 13 November 1972
- Preceded by: Kan'ichi Kawakami
- Succeeded by: Jiichirō Maeda
- Constituency: Osaka 2nd
- In office 13 June 1939 – 23 December 1948
- Preceded by: Yasutarō Kawamura
- Succeeded by: Kan'ichi Kawakami
- Constituency: Osaka 4th (1939–1946); Osaka 1st (1946–1947); Osaka 2nd (1947–1948)
- In office 1 May 1937 – 23 March 1938
- Preceded by: Masayoshi Morita
- Succeeded by: Masayoshi Morita
- Constituency: Osaka 4th
- In office 21 February 1928 – 21 January 1932
- Preceded by: Constituency established
- Succeeded by: Katsuharu Aota
- Constituency: Osaka 3rd

Personal details
- Born: 28 March 1891 Megijima, Kagawa, Japan
- Died: 3 October 1981 (aged 90) Nakahara-ku, Kawasaki, Kanagawa, Japan
- Party: Democratic Socialist (after 1960)
- Other party: SDP (1926–1932); Shakai Taishūtō (1932–1940); IRAA (1940–1945); JSP (1945–1951; 1955–1960); RSP (1951–1955)

Suehiro Nishio (西尾 末広, Nishio Suehiro; 28 March 1891 – 3 October 1981) was a Japanese labor activist and party politician whose career extended across the prewar and postwar periods. A long-serving member of the National Diet (15 terms in total), he was a power broker in the Japan Socialist Party and one of the main leaders of the Right Socialists. He served as Deputy Prime Minister of Japan during the cabinet of Hitoshi Ashida, and in January 1960, he led a breakaway faction out of the Japan Socialist Party to found the new Democratic Socialist Party.

== Early life and education ==
Nishio was born into poverty in Shiyūjima Village in Kagawa Prefecture, in what is now the city of Takamatsu on the island of Shikoku. At the age of 14, Nishio dropped out of school and went to Osaka to work a variety of factory jobs, beginning with a lathe apprenticeship at the Osaka Arsenal. Nishio soon became involved in militant labor activism, which forced him to frequently switch jobs. In 1919, he joined the Yuaikai labor federation, and in 1926 he participated in the formation of the Social Democratic Party

== Political career ==
Nishio was elected to the House of Representatives in the National Diet for the first time in 1928. In 1932, he was one of the founders of the Social Masses Party, the most conservative of the three prewar “proletarian” parties. Although he considered himself a socialist, Nishio was also strongly nationalist and virulently anti-communist, and was fond of saying that he came to socialism not via Marxism but rather through “idealistic humanism” (risōteki hyūmanizumu). Reelected to the Diet in 1937, Nishio strongly supported Japan's wartime mobilization efforts, and famously told Prime Minister Fumimaro Konoe during a 1939 Diet debate to "be a leader of conviction, like Hitler, like Mussolini, or like Stalin." Although Nishio was anti-communist and Hitler and Mussolini would soon be Japan's allies, Joseph Stalin was deemed an inappropriate hero for a Japanese Diet Member, and his fellow members voted to dismiss Nishio from the Diet.

In 1942, Nisho was reelected to the Diet despite being a "non-recommended candidate," meaning he had not received a recommendation from the single national political party, the Imperial Rule Assistance Association. Unlike many other non-recommended candidates who dutifully joined the IRAA upon election, Nishio refused to join, and became involved in an effort to depose Prime Minister Hideki Tōjō. Because of this record of resistance, Nishio was not purged from government by the U.S.-led military occupation of Japan after Japan's defeat in World War II.

=== Postwar power broker ===
In 1945, when the Communist and Socialist Parties were legalized again, Nishio became the leader of the right wing of the Japan Socialist Party (JSP). Unlike many other Socialist leaders, Nishio maintained strong connections with big business interests, which facilitated his rise within the party. In 1946, he became party General Secretary under chairman Tetsu Katayama and when the Socialists held power in 1947 and 1948, Nishio became Chief Cabinet Secretary under Prime Minister Katayama and was named Deputy Prime Minister under Prime Minister Hitoshi Ashida. However, Nishio's big business connections came back to haunt him when he emerged as a leading figure in the Showa Denko donations scandal that precipitated the fall of the Ashida cabinet, although Nishio was later cleared of all charges. The scandal also led to a split between the left and right halves of the Socialist Party amid mutual recriminations, with Nishio emerging as one of the leaders of the Right Socialists.

When the left and right Socialists re-merged in 1955, in a shotgun wedding as a response to the threat presented by the unification of Japan's conservative parties into the Liberal Democratic Party (LDP), Nishio vocally opposed the merger, fearing that the left Socialists were fellow travelers with communists, and was brought over only with great difficulty by appealing to the need for solidarity against the conservative threat. Thereafter, Nishio consistently pushed for the Socialist Party to try to expand its base beyond urban working classes to encompass a broader coalition of farmers and small business owners, a position which conflicted with the Marxist dogma adhered to by the party's left wing that a socialist party should be based entirely on the working class. Nishio also earned the enmity of the left Socialists because unlike most Socialist Party Diet Members, who drew support from the left-leaning Sōhyō labor federation, Nishio and his allies drew support from the smaller, much more moderate Zenrō labor federation, and in the late 1950s Zenrō had embarked on a controversial effort to hive off Zenrō-affiliated "Second unions" from Sōhyō affiliated unions, which Sōhyō viewed as an existential threat.

=== Formation of the Democratic Socialist Party ===
These simmering tensions came to a head during the massive 1960 Anpo protests against the attempt by conservative prime minister Nobusuke Kishi to revise the U.S.-Japan Security Treaty (known as "Anpo" in Japanese). Although the Japan Socialist Party and Sōhyō took leading roles in the protest movement and vowed to stop the passage of revised treaty, which they viewed as cementing in place the U.S.-Japan military alliance in the service of Japanese monopoly capitalism, Nishio remained a Japanese nationalist who favored the revised treaty as a better deal for Japan. Nishio was openly ambivalent about the anti-treaty movement, and Zenrō refused to participate whatsoever after the Socialist Party and Sōhyō decided to allow the Japan Communist Party to join the movement. The left wing of the Socialist Party and the leaders of the Sōhyō labor federation decided that Nishio was impeding the anti-treaty struggle and began taking steps to have him booted from the JSP. Rather than waiting to be expelled, Nishio bolted the party himself, announcing the formation of the new Democratic Socialist Party of Japan (DSP) on 24 January 1960, and taking around 40 members of the old Right Socialist Party with him.

Nishio's new party was received with great fanfare by the media in Japan and initially received support from a number of prominent centrist intellectuals, leading to talk of a "Democratic Socialist boom" in the spring of 1960. U.S. diplomats also placed great hopes on the new party as a much-needed more moderate alternative to the left-wing opposition parties in Japan. However, Nishio and his new party sat out the Anpo protests, even as they became much more heated and contentious in May and June, and in the fall 1960 general election Nishio refused to say whether the protests had been good or bad, which pleased no one in the polarized atmosphere of the time. Nishio was one of the speakers at the televised election debate that witnessed the spectacular assassination of Socialist Party Chairman Inejirō Asanuma, and his party's prospects may have been further damaged by a sympathy vote in favor of the JSP in the wake of Asanuma's killing. In the election just a few weeks later, the DSP suffered a disastrous result, falling from 40 seats in the Diet to just 17, while the JSP and LDP both increased their seat counts. Although the DSP managed to cling to a few seats in the Diet for a few more decades, it was never able to recapture the excitement it had accrued at the time of its formation, especially after the conservative LDP became more moderate under prime ministers Ikeda Hayato and Eisaku Satō.

== Later life and death ==
Nishio retired as chairman of the DSP in 1967 due to failing health, and retired from the Diet entirely in 1972. Nishio died on 3 October 1981, at the age of 90 due to renal failure.

Political offices
Preceded by Hitoshi Ashida	Deputy Prime Minister of Japan; 1948	Succeeded by Jōji Hayashi
Preceded by Jōji Hayashi	Chief Cabinet Secretary; 1947–1948	Succeeded by Gizō Tomabechi
Party political offices
Preceded by Tetsu Katayama	Secretary General of the Japan Socialist Party; 1946–1947	Succeeded by Inejiro Asanuma
New office	Chairman of the Democratic Socialist Party; 1960–1967	Succeeded by Eiichi Nishimura
