= 1969 Japanese general election =

- 27 December 1969

All 486 seats in the House of Representatives 244 seats needed for a majority
- Turnout: 68.51% (▼5.47pp)
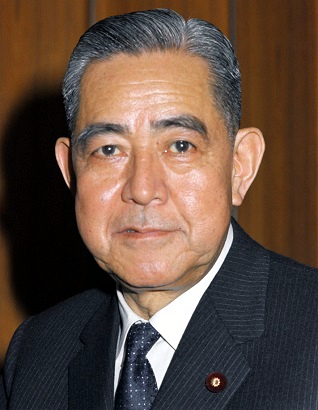

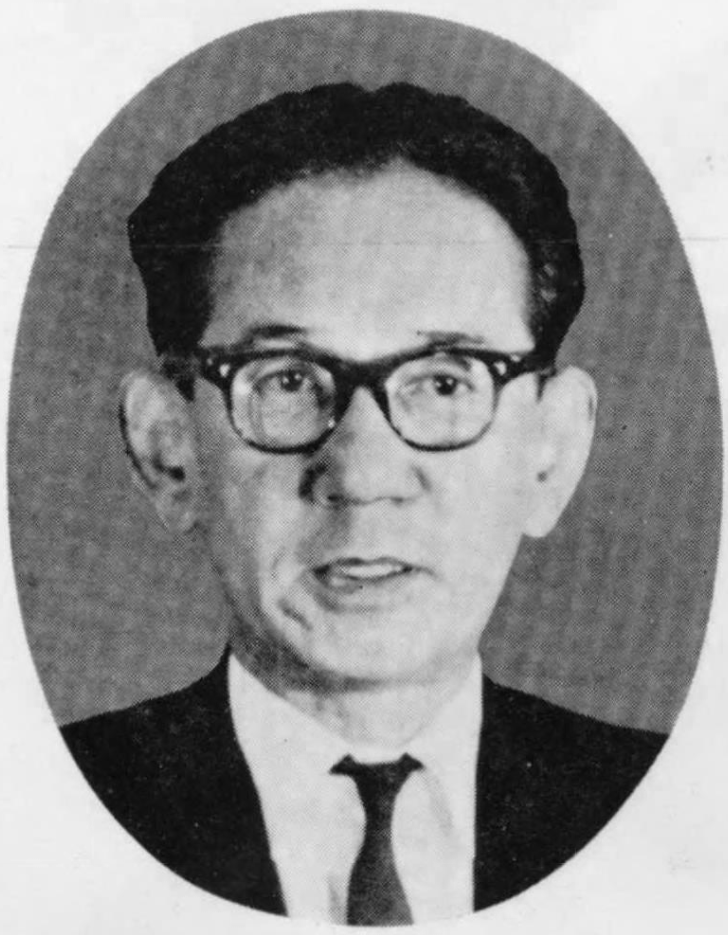

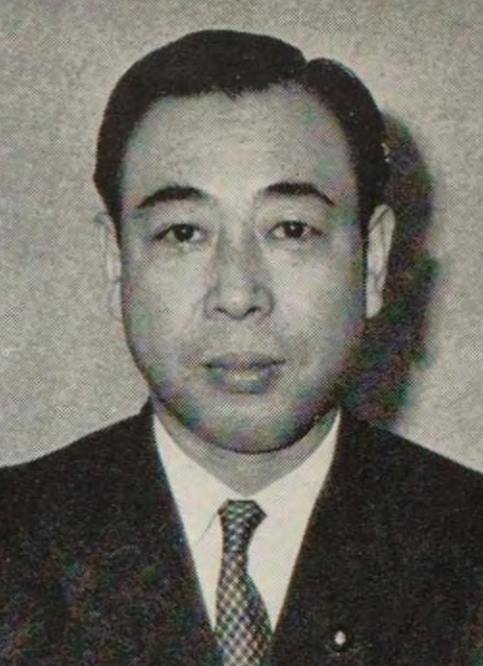

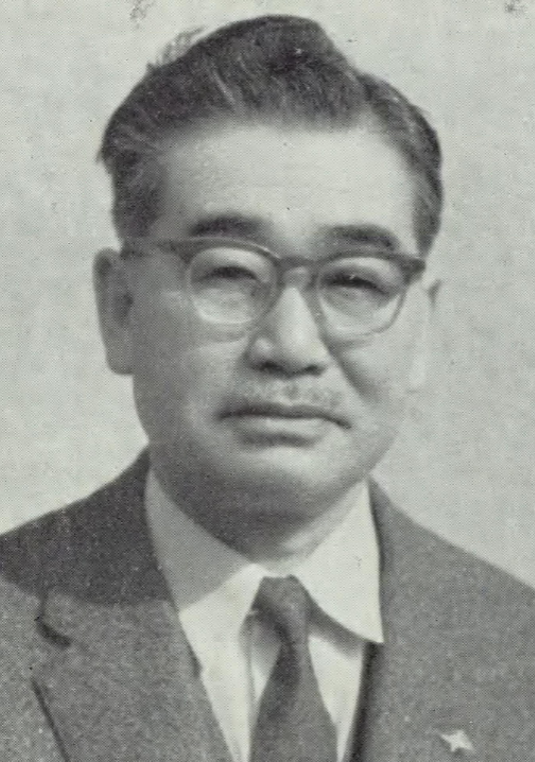

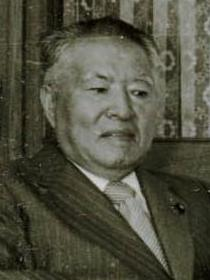
	First party	Second party	Third party
Leader	Eisaku Satō	Tomomi Narita	Yoshikatsu Takeiri
Party	LDP	Socialist	Kōmeitō
Last election	48.80%, 277 seats	27.88%, 140 seats	5.38%, 25 seats
Seats won	288	90	47
Seat change	▲11	▼50	▲22
Popular vote	22,381,570	10,074,101	5,124,666
Percentage	47.63%	21.44%	10.91%
Swing	▼1.17pp	▼6.44pp	▲5.53pp
	Fourth party	Fifth party
Leader	Eiichi Nishimura	Kenji Miyamoto
Party	Democratic Socialist	JCP
Last election	7.40%, 30 seats	4.76%, 5 seats
Seats won	31	14
Seat change	▲1	▲9
Popular vote	3,636,591	3,199,032
Percentage	7.74%	6.81%
Swing	▲0.34pp	▲2.05pp
- Districts shaded according to winners' vote strength
Prime Minister before election
Eisaku Satō
LDP
Elected Prime Minister
Eisaku Satō
LDP

General elections were held in Japan on 27 December 1969. The result was a victory for the Liberal Democratic Party, which won 288 of the 486 seats. Voter turnout was 68.51%, the lowest since 1947. This was the first general election in Japanese history in which candidates were allowed limited use of television as a means for campaigning, something that had been formerly proscribed under Japan's strict election campaign laws.

The main national policy issue at the time was the possibility of reverting Okinawa, which had been under American military occupation since the end of World War II, back over to Japanese control. Nonetheless, as is characteristic of Japanese elections, voters were more interested in pocket book issues, or "livelihood problems" (kurashi mondai), over pressing national and foreign policy questions. The election was marked by relative apathy, especially among young people in urban areas, with voter turnout in Tokyo being the lowest in the country, dropping from 63.12% in the last election to 56.35% in the 1969 election.

Moreover, old districting laws from the pre-war period were still in effect, and as urban areas increased in population, individual rural voters (who were heavily skewed towards the LDP) were disproportionately more powerful than the average individual urban voter. In any event, the actual popular vote of the LDP had been continuously sliding down since its formation, and the LDP's increase in seats was more attributable to its competent endorsement of only a limited number of local seat candidates when compared to the Japan Socialist Party, which ran too many candidates and thus split votes at a disastrous rate. Ironically, what little increase in support the JSP saw was found primarily in rural areas rather than urban areas, the latter of which were traditionally seen as the base of the JSP's support; the young Kōmeitō and reformed Japanese Communist Party had been gradually making inroads into urban areas, further eating away at the JSP's strength.

== Results ==
Ichirō Ozawa won a seat in the House of Representatives for the first time, becoming the youngest elected legislator at the time. He went on to become a powerful political figure in the LDP and other parties.

Future prime minister Tsutomu Hata was drafted to run in the election following his father's death, and won a seat for the first time. Future prime minister Junichiro Koizumi also attempted to win his late father's seat in the election, but lost.

Party	Votes	%	Seats	+/–
Liberal Democratic Party	22,381,570	47.63	288	+11
Japan Socialist Party	10,074,101	21.44	90	−50
Komeitō	5,124,666	10.91	47	+22
Democratic Socialist Party	3,636,591	7.74	31	+1
Japanese Communist Party	3,199,032	6.81	14	+9
Other parties	81,373	0.17	0	0
Independents	2,492,560	5.30	16	+7
Total	46,989,893	100.00	486	0
Valid votes	46,989,893	99.03		
Invalid/blank votes	459,816	0.97		
Total votes	47,449,709	100.00		
Registered voters/turnout	69,260,424	68.51		
Source: Statistics Bureau of Japan

=== By prefecture ===
Prefecture	Total seats	Seats won					
Prefecture	Total seats	LDP	JSP	Kōmeitō	DSP	JCP	Ind.
Aichi	20	13	4		3		
Akita	8	4	3		1		
Aomori	7	4		1		1	1
Chiba	13	10	1	2			
Ehime	9	6	2				1
Fukui	4	3	1				
Fukuoka	19	9	3	4	2	1	
Fukushima	12	9	1		1		1
Gifu	9	7	2				
Gunma	10	8	2				
Hiroshima	12	8	1	1	1		1
Hokkaido	22	12	7	2	1		
Hyōgo	19	9	4	3	2	1	
Ibaraki	12	9	2	1			
Ishikawa	6	5					1
Iwate	8	4	4				
Kagawa	6	4	1				1
Kagoshima	11	8	1				2
Kanagawa	14	5	3	3	3		
Kōchi	5	3		1		1	
Kumamoto	10	8	1	1			
Kyoto	10	4	1	2	1	2	
Mie	9	7	2				
Miyagi	9	6	3				
Miyazaki	6	4	1				1
Nagano	13	7	4			1	1
Nagasaki	9	5	2	1	1		
Nara	5	3		1	1		
Niigata	15	9	6				
Ōita	7	5	1				1
Okayama	10	6	2	2			
Osaka	23	8	2	6	6	1	
Saga	5	4	1				
Saitama	13	8	2	1			2
Shiga	5	3	1		1		
Shimane	5	4	1				
Shizuoka	14	9	3	1	1		
Tochigi	10	6	2	1			1
Tokushima	5	3	1	1			
Tokyo	39	17	2	10	4	6	
Tottori	4	3	1				
Toyama	6	4	2				
Wakayama	6	3	2	1			
Yamagata	8	3	3				2
Yamaguchi	9	6		1	2		
Yamanashi	5	3	2				
Total	486	288	90	47	31	14	16
