= Democratic Socialist Party (Japan) =

1960–1994 Japanese political party

Democratic Socialist Party 民主社会党 Minshu Shakai-tō
- Founder: Suehiro Nishio
- Founded: 24 January 1960
- Dissolved: 9 December 1994
- Split from: Japan Socialist Party
- Preceded by: Rightist Socialist Party of Japan (factions)
- Merged into: New Frontier Party
- Youth wing: Minsha Youth
- Ideology: Social democracy; Conservatism (Japanese)
- Political position: Centre to centre-left
- International affiliation: Socialist International
- Colors: Red (official); Orange (customary)

Party flag
- Politics of Japan; Political parties; Elections; A: The Democratic Socialist Party was a conservative party, due to its stances on social issues and national security, and was considered an "extremely conservative" party in Japan. However, its economic policies were of social democracy.

The Democratic Socialist Party (民主社会党, Minshu Shakai-tō; abbreviated 民社党, Minsha-tō) was a political party in Japan from 1960 to 1994. It was formed in January 1960 by a moderate breakaway faction of the Japan Socialist Party led by Suehiro Nishio, primarily consisting of members from the former Rightist Socialist Party of Japan, amid disagreements over the Anpo protests and cooperation with the Japanese Communist Party. The party advocated social democracy with conservative stances on social issues and national security (often described as right-wing social democracy or centre to centre-left), strongly supported the Japan–United States alliance, and drew much of its organizational and financial support from the Dōmei private-sector labour confederation. It was a member of the Socialist International and dissolved in 1994 to join the New Frontier Party; many of its former members later joined the Democratic Party of Japan, with its tradition continuing as a faction within successor parties.

== History ==
The party was established in January 1960 by a breakaway faction of the Japanese Socialist Party. Led by Suehiro Nishio, it was made up of members of the most moderate wing of the former Rightist Socialist Party of Japan, a moderate faction that had existed as an independent party between 1948 and 1955 before reluctantly merging back together with the Leftist Socialist Party of Japan. Although long-standing ideological differences and factional rivalries played a key role, the proximate cause of the split was internal disagreements over how to conduct the ongoing Anpo protests against revision of the Treaty of Mutual Cooperation and Security Between the United States and Japan, known as Anpo in Japanese, and whether or not to cooperate with the Communist Party of Japan in doing so.

Declassified United States government documents later revealed that covert CIA funding had also helped encourage the founding of this breakaway party. CIA support was aimed at moderating and subverting the political opposition to the ruling conservative Liberal Democratic Party, which was the main CIA funded party.

The DSP was dissolved in 1994 to join the New Frontier Party. In 1996, the Japan Socialist Party was transformed into the Social Democratic Party. Two years later, in 1998, the New Frontier Party dissolved and most former DSP members eventually joined the Democratic Party of Japan. Despite the dissolution of the DSP in 1994, its youth organisation (Minsha Youth) survived until 2003 and was a member of the International Union of Socialist Youth (IUSY). After Minsha Youth was dissolved, some of its former members and independent social democrats formed Young Socialists, a new youth organisation which retained full membership in IUSY; however, it was finally dissolved on 8 March 2008 without any successor organisation and abandoned its IUSY membership.

The tradition of the DSP is carried on by the Minsha kyōkai (民社協会, Democratic Socialist Group) as a faction within the liberal Democratic Party of Japan, Democratic Party and now centre-right Democratic Party for the People.

== Political position and foreign policy ==
The DSP was rated "moderate", "moderate social-democratic", "centrist", "centre-left", and "leftist" by Japanese political standards at the time, but at the same time it was also regarded as a "conservative" political party. It derived much of its financial and organisational support from the Domei private-sector labour confederation, but unlike other social-democratic political parties in Japan, the party was not hostile to accepting neoliberal policies Due to the DSP's syncretic political position, the party's ideology is often referred to as right-wing social democracy.

The DSP strongly backed the Japan–United States alliance. For this reason, the DSP was often called the "right-wing party" in Japan, but because the DSP had a belief in socialist ideals, it was classified as a political "centrist" along with the old Komeito at the time. In addition, the DSP was a member of left-wing Socialist International.

== Leaders ==
No.	Photo	Name (Birth–death)	Constituency/title	Term of office	
No.	Photo	Name (Birth–death)	Constituency/title	Took office	Left office
1		Suehiro Nishio (1891–1981)	Rep for Osaka 4th district (1947–93) Osaka 1st district (1947–93) Osaka 2nd district (1947–93)	24 January 1960	June 1967
2		Eiichi Nishimura (1904–1971)	Rep for Osaka 2nd district (1947–93) Osaka 5th district (1947–93)	June 1967	27 April 1971
3		Ikkō Kasuga (1910–1989)	Rep for Aichi 1st district (1947–93)	27 April 1971	28 November 1977
4		Ryōsaku Sasaki (1915–2000)	Cou for National district Rep for Hyogo 5th district (1947–93)	28 November 1977	23 April 1985
5		Saburo Tsukamoto (1927–2020)	Rep for Aichi 2nd district (1947–93) Aichi 6th district (1947–93)	23 April 1985	25 February 1989
6		Eiichi Nagasue (1918–1994)	Cou for Kyoto Prefecture Rep for Kyoto 1st district (1947–93)	25 February 1989	April 1990
7		Keigo Ōuchi (1930–2016)	Rep for Tokyo 2nd district (1947–93)	April 1990	8 June 1994
8		Takashi Yonezawa (1940–2016)	Rep for Miyazaki 1st district (1947–93) Kyushu PR block (from Miyazaki)	8 June 1994	9 December 1994

== Election results ==
=== House of Representatives ===
Election year	Candidates	No. of seats won	Change	Status
1960	105	17 / 467	Steady	Opposition
1963	59	23 / 467	▲6	Opposition
1967	60	30 / 486	▲7	Opposition
1969	68	31 / 486	▲1	Opposition
1972	65	19 / 491	▼12	Opposition
1976	51	29 / 511	▲10	Opposition
1979	53	35 / 511	▲6	Opposition
1980	50	32 / 511	▼3	Opposition
1983	54	38 / 511	▲6	Opposition
1986	56	26 / 512	▼12	Opposition
1990	44	14 / 512	▼12	Opposition
1993	28	15 / 511	▲1	Governing coalition

=== House of Councillors ===
Election year	Seats		Status
Election year	Total	Contested	Status
1962	12 / 250	5 / 125	Opposition
1965	7 / 250	3 / 125	Opposition
1968	10 / 250	7 / 125	Opposition
1971	13 / 252	6 / 126	Opposition
1974	10 / 252	5 / 126	Opposition
1977	11 / 252	6 / 126	Opposition
1980	12 / 252	6 / 126	Opposition
1983	12 / 252	6 / 126	Opposition
1986	12 / 252	5 / 126	Opposition
1989	8 / 252	3 / 126	Opposition
1992	9 / 252	4 / 126	Opposition

== See also ==
- Blue Labour
- Democratic Socialists '70
- Italian Democratic Socialist Party
- New Italian Socialist Party
- Labor Right
- Seeheimer Kreis
- Social Democratic Party (UK)
- Social Democrats USA
- New Fraternity Party
