= 2012 in Japan =

- Decades: 1990s; 2000s; 2010s; 2020s; 2030s
- See also: Other events of 2012; History of Japan • Timeline • Years

Events in the year 2012 in Japan.

The year 2012 corresponded to the year Heisei 24 (平成24年) in the Japanese calendar.

== Incumbents ==
- Emperor – Akihito
- Prime Minister: Yoshihiko Noda (D–Chiba) until December 26, Shinzō Abe (L–Yamaguchi)
- Chief Cabinet Secretary: Osamu Fujimura (D–Osaka) until December 26, Yoshihide Suga (L–Kanagawa)
- Chief Justice of the Supreme Court: Hironobu Takesaki
- President of the House of Representatives: Takahiro Yokomichi (D–Hokkaido) until November 16, Bunmei Ibuki (L–Kyoto) from December 26
- President of the House of Councillors: Kenji Hirata (D–Gifu)
- Diet sessions: 180th (regular, January 24 to September 8), 181st (extraordinary, October 29 to November 16), 182nd (special, December 26 to 28)

=== Governors ===
- Aichi Prefecture: Hideaki Omura
- Akita Prefecture: Norihisa Satake
- Aomori Prefecture: Shingo Mimura
- Chiba Prefecture: Kensaku Morita
- Ehime Prefecture: Tokihiro Nakamura
- Fukui Prefecture: Issei Nishikawa
- Fukuoka Prefecture: Hiroshi Ogawa
- Fukushima Prefecture: Yūhei Satō
- Gifu Prefecture: Hajime Furuta
- Gunma Prefecture: Masaaki Osawa
- Hiroshima Prefecture: Hidehiko Yuzaki
- Hokkaido: Harumi Takahashi
- Hyogo Prefecture: Toshizō Ido
- Ibaraki Prefecture: Masaru Hashimoto
- Ishikawa Prefecture: Masanori Tanimoto
- Iwate Prefecture: Takuya Tasso
- Kagawa Prefecture: Keizō Hamada
- Kagoshima Prefecture: Satoshi Mitazono
- Kanagawa Prefecture: Yuji Kuroiwa
- Kochi Prefecture: Masanao Ozaki
- Kumamoto Prefecture: Ikuo Kabashima
- Kyoto Prefecture: Keiji Yamada
- Mie Prefecture: Eikei Suzuki
- Miyagi Prefecture: Yoshihiro Murai
- Miyazaki Prefecture: Shunji Kōno
- Nagano Prefecture: Shuichi Abe
- Nagasaki Prefecture: Hōdō Nakamura
- Nara Prefecture: Shōgo Arai
- Niigata Prefecture: Hirohiko Izumida
- Oita Prefecture: Katsusada Hirose
- Okayama Prefecture: Masahiro Ishii (until 11 November); Ryuta Ibaragi (starting 11 November)
- Okinawa Prefecture: Hirokazu Nakaima
- Osaka Prefecture: Ichirō Matsui
- Saga Prefecture: Yasushi Furukawa
- Saitama Prefecture: Kiyoshi Ueda
- Shiga Prefecture: Yukiko Kada
- Shiname Prefecture: Zenbe Mizoguchi
- Shizuoka Prefecture: Heita Kawakatsu
- Tochigi Prefecture: Tomikazu Fukuda
- Tokushima Prefecture: Kamon Iizumi
- Tokyo: Shintarō Ishihara (until 25 October); Naoki Inose (starting 25 October)
- Tottori Prefecture: Shinji Hirai
- Toyama Prefecture: Takakazu Ishii
- Wakayama Prefecture: Yoshinobu Nisaka
- Yamagata Prefecture: Mieko Yoshimura
- Yamaguchi Prefecture: Sekinari Nii (until 21 August); Shigetarō Yamamoto (starting 21 August)
- Yamanashi Prefecture: Shōmei Yokouchi

== Events ==
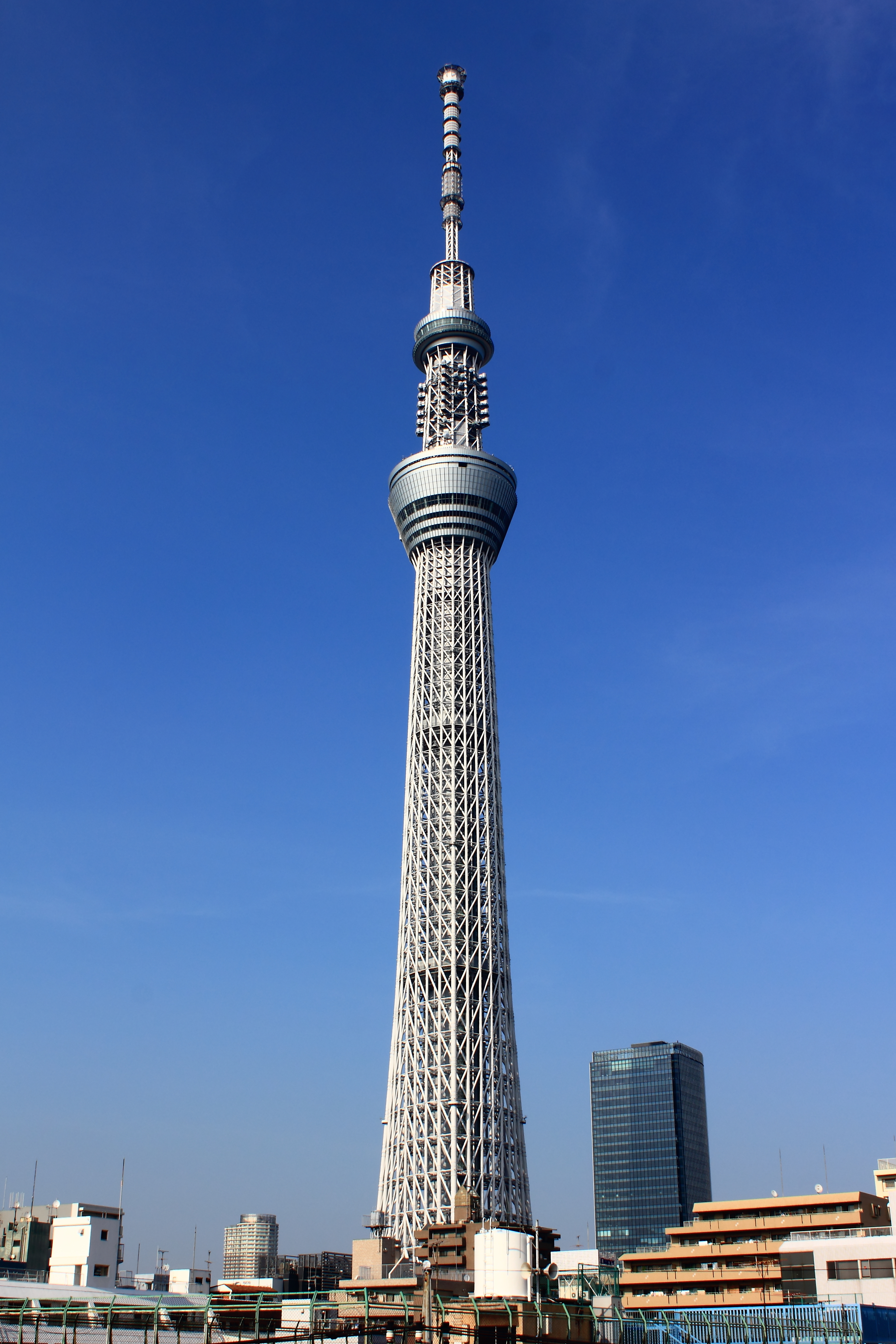
Tokyo Skytree, which opened in March 2012

- January 1 – A strong (magnitude 7.0), but very deep (370 km) earthquake shakes large parts of Eastern Japan at a JMA-intensity of 4. The quake with an epicenter about 500 km South of mainland Tokyo in the Pacific Ocean near Torishima, Tokyo doesn't cause any reported serious damage or injuries, but can be felt (intensity≥1) from Southern Hokkaidō to Chūgoku.
- January 4 – Nagakute town in the former Aichi county of Aichi became a city.
- January 13 – In a cabinet reshuffle, Prime Minister Noda replaces five ministers, including two who had been the subject of censure motions by the opposition dominated upper house in December 2011; Katsuya Okada becomes deputy prime minister.
- late January and early February – At least 50 people die in heavy snow and record low temperatures across the country.
- February 5 – Kyoto City mayoral election: In the traditional Communist stronghold, incumbent mayor Daisaku Kadokawa won re-election with support from the major parties against Japanese Communist Party-supported Kazuo Nakamura by 54 to 46 percent of the vote.
- February 10: The central government sets up the reconstruction agency (fukkō-chō) to coordinate the reconstruction efforts after the Great East Japan Earthquake of 2011 with a central budget, replacing the previous reconstruction headquarters (fukkō taisaku honbu) at the Cabinet Secretariat. Tatsuo Hirano becomes reconstruction minister; Masaharu Nakagawa returns to the cabinet to take over some responsibilities from Katsuya Okada and Tatsuo Hirano.
- February 29: Construction of Tokyo Skytree is completed.
- March 1 – Low-budget airline Peach launches flights.
- March 11 – Japan commemorates the first anniversary of the 2011 Tōhoku earthquake and tsunami.
- March 25 – Kumamoto gubernatorial election, incumbent Ikuo Kabashima sought re-election with support from the three largest parties DPJ, LDP and Kōmeitō. He easily beat Communist challenger Keisuke Kuboyama. Turnout hit a record low at 38.4 percent.
- March 31 – Analogue television broadcasts are terminated in the prefectures of Miyagi, Fukushima and Iwate as Japan completed its digital switchover since it was started last July 24, 2011.
- April 1 – Kumamoto City, the capital of Kumamoto, became a City designated by government ordinance.
- April 12 – A car in Higashiyama-ku, Kyoto crashed into a pole and hit multiple pedestrians, resulting in eight dead (including the driver) and twelve injured. The accident, which was later attributed to the driver's epilepsy, was the worst traffic accident in Japan since 1996.
- May 13 – A hotel fire in Fukuyama, Hiroshima Prefecture, killed seven and injured three people.
- May 22 – Tokyo Skytree, which was completed on 29 February 2012, officially opened to the public.
- June 5 – In a cabinet reshuffle, prime minister Noda replaces five ministers, including two who had been subject to censure by the opposition dominated upper house in April 2012; Satoshi Morimoto becomes the first non-parliamentarian defence minister.
- June 10 – In the Okinawa prefectural election governor Hirokazu Nakaima's centre-right supporters (LDP, Kōmeitō and independents) fail to win a majority in the Okinawa Prefectural Assembly.
- July 8 – Kagoshima gubernatorial election: Incumbent governor Yūichirō Itō supported by the major prefectural parties (LDP, DPJ, Kōmeitō, PNP) beats anti-nuclear activist Yoshitaka Mukohara to win a third term.
- July 21 – Killer Motel horror film is released.
- July 29 – LDP-Kōmeitō-supported former Cabinet Secretariat and MLIT bureaucrat Shigetarō Yamamoto wins the Yamaguchi gubernatorial election to succeed retiring four-term governor Sekinari Nii. Defeated candidates are energy researcher Tetsunari Iida, ex-Democratic national Representative Tsutomu Takamura and former prefectural bureaucrat Shigeyuki Miwa.
- September 19 – The Nuclear Regulation Authority (NRA, Genshiryoku Kisei Iinkai, lit. "Atomic Power Regulation Commission") and its subordinate agency (Genshiryoku Kisei-chō) launched as an independent atomic regulator supervised by the Ministry of the Environment. They replace the Nuclear and Industrial Safety Agency of METI, the Japanese Nuclear Safety Commission of the Cabinet Office and departments of other ministries.
- September 21 – Yoshihiko Noda is reelected as president of the Democratic Party for a full term, now changed to three years, against challengers Kazuhiro Haraguchi, Hirotaka Akamatsu and Michihiko Kano.
- September 22 – Party president Natsuo Yamaguchi of Kōmeitō is re-elected unchallenged as no other candidate has filed a candidacy before the official campaign start on September 14.
- September 26 – Shinzo Abe succeeds Sadakazu Tanigaki as president of the Liberal Democratic Party (official campaigning started on September 14).
- October 1 – Prime minister Yoshihiko Noda reshuffles his cabinet for the third time; newly appointed justice minister Keishū Tanaka soon faces calls to resign over a report about an (illegal) political donation from a foreigner and contacts to Yakuza members.
- October 21 – Niigata governor Hirohiko Izumida, supported by the major non-communist parties (DPJ, LDP, LF, Kōmeitō, SDP), is reelected for a third term against Communist challenger Shijio Hiwatashi and perennial Smile Party candidate Mac Akasaka.
- October 28 – Gubernatorial elections in Okayama and Toyama and by-election for the House of Representatives in Kagoshima 3rd district: In Toyama, incumbent Takakazu Ishii is reelected for a third term; in Okayama, former Tenmaya department store president Ryūta Ibaragi succeeds retiring Masahiro Ishii; Kazuaki Miyaji wins the by-election to replace Tadahiro Matsushita, further reducing prime minister Noda's coalition majority after a string of defections.
- November 18 – In the Tochigi gubernatorial election, incumbent Tomikazu Fukuda is reelected for a third term.
- December 2 – The Sasago road tunnel in Yamanashi Prefecture collapses, resulting in 9 fatalities and 2 injuries.
- December 16 – Liberal Democratic Party and Kōmeitō win a two-thirds majority of seats in the 46th general election of members of the House of Representatives, Naoki Inose wins the Tokyo gubernatorial election, referendum for ten judges on the Supreme Court, by-elections for several prefectural assemblies.

== The Nobel Prize ==
- Shinya Yamanaka: 2012 Nobel Prize in Physiology or Medicine winner.

== Predicted and scheduled events ==
=== Electoral calendar ===
- December 26 – Designation election of the prime minister in the National Diet

=== Administrative mergers and status changes ===
- October 1 – Shiraoka town, South Saitama County (Minami-Saitama-gun), Saitama becomes a city.

== Deaths ==
=== January ===
- January 2: Yoshiro Hayashi, 89, golfer (b. 1922)

=== February ===
- February 16: Chikage Awashima, 87, actress

=== March ===
- March 29: Yasuaki Uwabe, 48, perpetrator of the Shimonoseki Station massacre.

=== May ===
- May 29: Kaneto Shindo, 100, film director

=== July ===
- July 9: Isuzu Yamada, 95, actress

=== September ===
- September 10: Tadahiro Matsushita, 73, politician
- September 16: Shinichi Nishimiya, 60, diplomat, Ambassador-designate to China (2012).

== See also ==
- 2012 in Japanese music
- 2012 in Japanese television
- List of Japanese films of 2012
