= 2008 Yamaguchi gubernatorial election =

Japanese gubernatorial election

- 3 August 2008
- Turnout: 37.21 ▼1.01
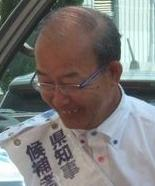

Candidate	Sekinari Nii	Toshiki Fukue
Party	LDP	JCP
Popular vote	317,449	123,950
Percentage	70.64%	29,36%
Governor before election
Sekinari Nii
LDP
Elected Governor
Sekinari Nii
LDP

The 2008 Yamaguchi gubernatorial election was held on 3 August 2008 to elect the next governor of Yamaguchi (山口県, Yamaguchi-ken), a prefecture of Japan in the Chūgoku region of the main island of Honshu.

== Candidates ==
- Sekinari Nii, elected in 1996, 2000 and 2004, endorsed by LDP, New Komeito and prefectural assembly lawmakers from DPJ.
- Toshiki Fukue, former chairman of prefectoral Labour federation, backed by the JCP.

== Results ==
Yamaguchi gubernatorial 2008
Party	Candidate	Votes	%	±%
LDP	Sekinari Nii *	317,449	70.64	▼9.76
JCP	Toshiki Fukue	123,950	29,36	▲9.76
Turnout		449.382	37,21	▼1.01
Registered electors		1,207,826		
LDP hold		Swing		
