= Japan 2012 =

Japan 2012 may refer to:

- 2012 FIFA U-20 Women's World Cup, an Association football event
- 2012 FIFA Club World Cup, an Association football event
- 2012 in Japan, listing events in the year 2012 in Japan
