= Toranosuke Katayama =

Japanese politician (1935–2025)

- 片山 虎之助
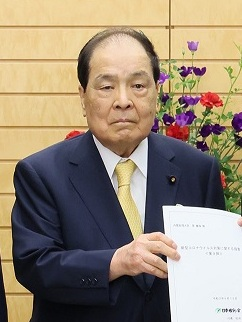
- Katayama in 2021

Co-Leader of Nippon Ishin no Kai
- In office 12 December 2015 – 26 November 2021
- Leader: Ichirō Matsui
- Preceded by: Position established
- Succeeded by: Nobuyuki Baba

Minister for Internal Affairs and Communications
- In office 6 January 2001 – 22 September 2003
- Prime Minister: Yoshirō Mori; Junichiro Koizumi
- Preceded by: Office established
- Succeeded by: Tarō Asō

Minister of Posts and Telecommunications
- In office 5 December 2000 – 6 January 2001
- Prime Minister: Yoshirō Mori
- Preceded by: Kozo Hirabayashi
- Succeeded by: Office abolished

Minister of Home Affairs
- In office 5 December 2000 – 6 January 2001
- Prime Minister: Yoshirō Mori
- Preceded by: Tsukasa Nishida
- Succeeded by: Office abolished

Director-General of the Management and Coordination Agency
- In office 5 December 2000 – 6 January 2001
- Prime Minister: Yoshirō Mori
- Preceded by: Kunihiro Tsuzuki
- Succeeded by: Office abolished

Member of the House of Councillors
- In office 26 July 2010 – 25 July 2022
- Constituency: National PR
- In office 24 July 1989 – 28 July 2007
- Preceded by: Mutsuo Kimura
- Succeeded by: Yumiko Himei
- Constituency: Okayama at-large

Personal details
- Born: 2 August 1935 Kasaoka, Okayama, Japan
- Died: 18 December 2025 (aged 90)
- Party: Innovation (2015–2025)
- Other political affiliations: LDP (1989–2010); SP (2010–2012); JRP (2012–2014); JIP (2014–2015)
- Relations: Yoshinobu Ishikawa (brother-in-law)
- Children: Daisuke Katayama
- Education: University of Tokyo (L.L.B.)

Toranosuke Katayama (片山 虎之助, Katayama Toranosuke; 2 August 1935 – 18 December 2025) was a Japanese politician who held multiple different cabinet posts. He was a former member of the Liberal Democratic Party (LDP), and was co-president of Nippon Ishin no Kai (Japanese: Japan Restoration Party; JPR) alongside Ichirō Matsui from 2016 to 2021.

== Early life and education ==
Katayama was born in Okayama Prefecture on 2 August 1935. He graduated from the University of Tokyo's faculty of law in March 1958.

== Career ==
Katayama began his career at the agency of Home Affairs in April 1958. He became vice governor of Okayama Prefecture in April 1985. He was elected to the House of Councilors in July 1989, being a member of the LDP. He was reelected to the House for a second (in July 1995), third (in July 2001) and fourth (in July 2001) term.

In the LDP, Katayama was part of the faction headed by Ryutaro Hashimoto and then of the Tsushima faction at the beginning of the 2002.

After holding different roles in the House, he was appointed minister of posts and telecommunications, minister of home affairs, and also, director-general of the management and coordination agency in December 2000. In January 2001, Katayama was named as the minister for public management, home affairs, posts and telecommunications. On 8 February 2002, Katayama was appointed minister of public management in the cabinet headed by Prime Minister Junichiro Koizumi. He retained his post in the cabinet reshuffle on 8 December 2002. Later he became secretary general of the LDP in the upper house in July 2004. Until 2007, Katayama was the number two or deputy leader of the party's upper house group and also, the leader of its campaign strategy. Katayama lost his seat in the upper house in the 2007 election.

Katayama left the LDP when the party set an age limit of 70 for candidates in the House of Councillors proportional representation bloc election in 2010. As a result, he joined the now-defunct Tachiagare Nippon. He was reelected to the upper house for the fifth term in July 2010 for the Tachiagare Nippon. He was also the secretary-general of the House of Councillors of the party. Next he became a member of the JPR, which was led jointly by Tōru Hashimoto and Shintaro Ishihara. He began to represent the party at the House and was a member of the House's committee on general affairs.

After the JRP disbanded, he joined the Japan Innovation Party. On 2 September 2015, he joined Initiatives from Osaka.

== Death ==
Katayama died on 18 December 2025, at the age of 90.

Political offices
New ministerial post	Minister for Internal Affairs and Communications; 2001–2003	Succeeded by Tarō Asō
Party political offices
New post	Co-Leader of Nippon Ishin no Kai; 2015–2021	Succeeded by Nobuyuki Baba
New post	Head of the Diet Members Group, Nippon Ishin no Kai; 2015–2021	Succeeded by Nobuyuki Baba
New post	Chairman of the House of Councillors Caucus, Nippon Ishin no Kai; 2015–2021	Succeeded by Hitoshi Asada
Preceded by Mikio Aoki	Secretary General for the Liberal Democratic Party in the House of Councillors; 2004–2007	Succeeded by Masaaki Yamazaki
