= 2012 Yamaguchi gubernatorial election =

Japanese gubernatorial election

- 29 July 2012
- Turnout: 45.32 ▲8.11
Governor before election
Sekinari Nii
LDP
Elected Governor
Shigetaro Yamamoto
LDP

A gubernatorial election was held on 29 July 2012 to elect the next governor of Yamaguchi (山口県, Yamaguchi-ken), a prefecture of Japan in the Chūgoku region of the main island of Honshu.

Sekinari Nii (LDP), who had held office since 1996, did not stand for re-election.

== Candidates ==
- Shigetaru Yamamoto, former bureaucrat of the ministry of Transports, endorsed by LDP and New Komeito.
- Tetsunari Iida, engineer, anti-nuclear and pro renewable energy. Backed by the SDP and the JCP.
- Tsutomu Takamura, former member of the House of Representatives for the DPJ.
- Shigeyuki Miwa, physician, former Director of Health Promotion Division of the Yamaguchi Prefecture.

== Results ==
Yamaguchi gubernatorial 2012
Party	Candidate	Votes	%	±%
LDP	Shigetaru Yamamoto	252,461	47.57	▼23.07
Social Democratic	Tetsunari Iida	185,654	34.98	▲5.62
Democratic	Tsutomu Takamura	55,418	10.44	
	Shigeyuki Miwa	37,150	7.00	
Turnout		537.077	45.32	▲8.11
Registered electors		1,185,190		
LDP hold		Swing		
