= Kimi Onoda =

Japanese politician (born 1982)

- 小野田 紀美
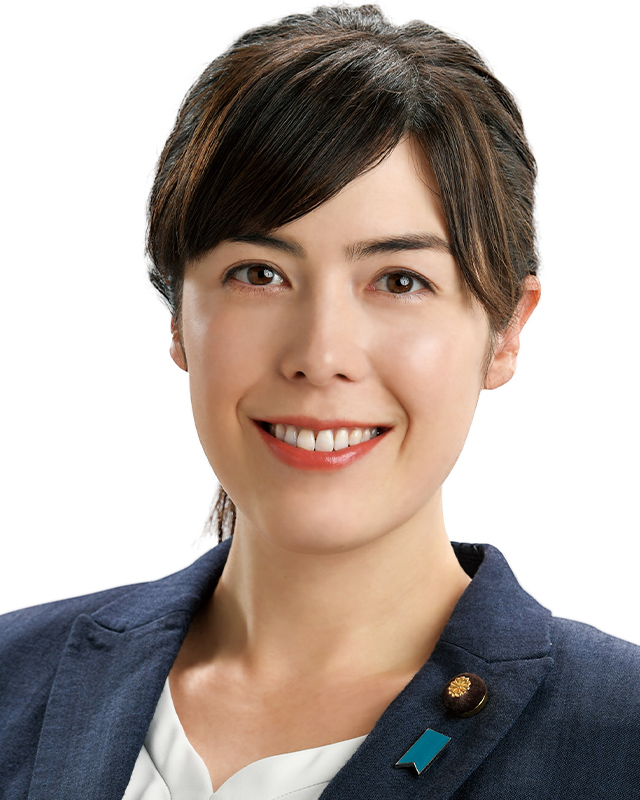
- Official portrait, 2020

Minister in charge of Economic Security
- Incumbent
- Assumed office 21 October 2025
- Prime Minister: Sanae Takaichi
- Preceded by: Minoru Kiuchi

Minister in charge of a Society of Well-Ordered and Harmonious Coexistence with Foreign Nationals
- Incumbent
- Assumed office 21 October 2025
- Prime Minister: Sanae Takaichi
- Preceded by: Office established

Member of the House of Councillors for Okayama at-large
- Incumbent
- Assumed office 26 July 2016
- Preceded by: Satsuki Eda
- Majority: 180,000 (54.7%)

Member of the Kita City Assembly
- In office 24 April 2011 – 3 October 2015

Personal details
- Born: 7 December 1982 (age 43) Chicago, Illinois, U.S.
- Citizenship: United States (1982–2017); Japan (since 1985)
- Party: Liberal Democratic
- Education: Takushoku University

Kimi Onoda (Japanese: 小野田 紀美, Hepburn: Onoda Kimi; born 7 December 1982) is a Japanese politician of the Liberal Democratic Party. She has been Minister in charge of Economic Security and Minister in charge of a Society of Well-Ordered and Harmonious Coexistence with Foreign Nationals since 2025 within Prime Minister Sanae Takaichi's cabinet while being the youngest minister within the cabinet. She is a member of the House of Councillors representing Okayama.

She had previously served as Parliamentary Vice-Minister of Defense from 2022 to 2023 under Second Kishida Cabinet and Parliamentary Vice-Minister of Justice from 2020 to 2021 under the Suga Cabinet.

== Early life and education ==
Onoda Kimi was born on December 7, 1982, in Chicago, Illinois, United States, and moved to Setouchi, Okayama Prefecture, Japan at the age of one. Her mother is Japanese and her father is Irish American. Her father abandoned her pregnant mother and her when she was two, leaving them with no child support. After graduating from Seishin Girls' High School, Onoda studied politics at Takushoku University. There she acquired a high school teacher's license in civics. After graduating from university, she was in charge of public relations and promotion at a video game company.

== Career ==
After being a 5th year student at the Tokyo LDP Political Management School, Onoda ran for the Liberal Democratic Party-certified Kita Ward Councillor election in 2011 and was elected for the first time. In 2015, she was re-elected to the Kita Ward Council. The following year, in 2016, she ran for the 24th regular election for the House of Councillors as an LDP-certified candidate (Komeito nomination). Onoda defeated Kentaro Kuroishi, who was nominated by the Social Democratic Party and the Japanese Communist Party, and won the election as the successor to former House of Councillors chairman Satsuki Eda of the Democratic Party, who announced his retirement from politics.

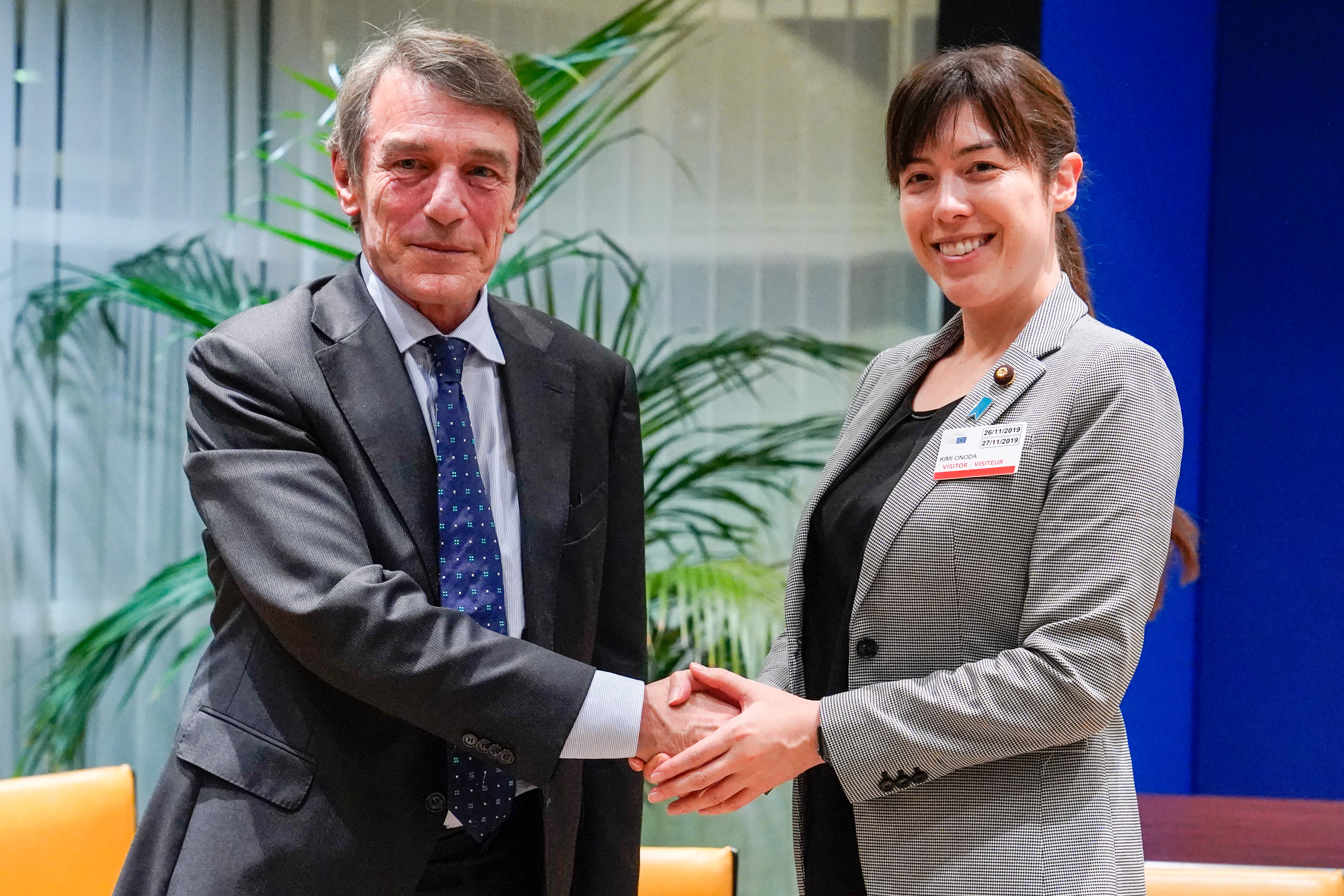
President of the European Parliament David Sassoli and Onoda (2019)

In 2019, she joined the Takeshita Faction (Heisei Kenkyūkai). Onoda was appointed Parliamentary Vice-Minister of Justice in the Suga Cabinet in September 2020. On July 10, 2022, Onoda won the 26th regular election for the House of Councillors by 180,000 votes (54.7% of the vote), far exceeding the previous runner-up margin (approximately 108,000 votes), with support from independent voters, despite the lack of support from the Komeito.

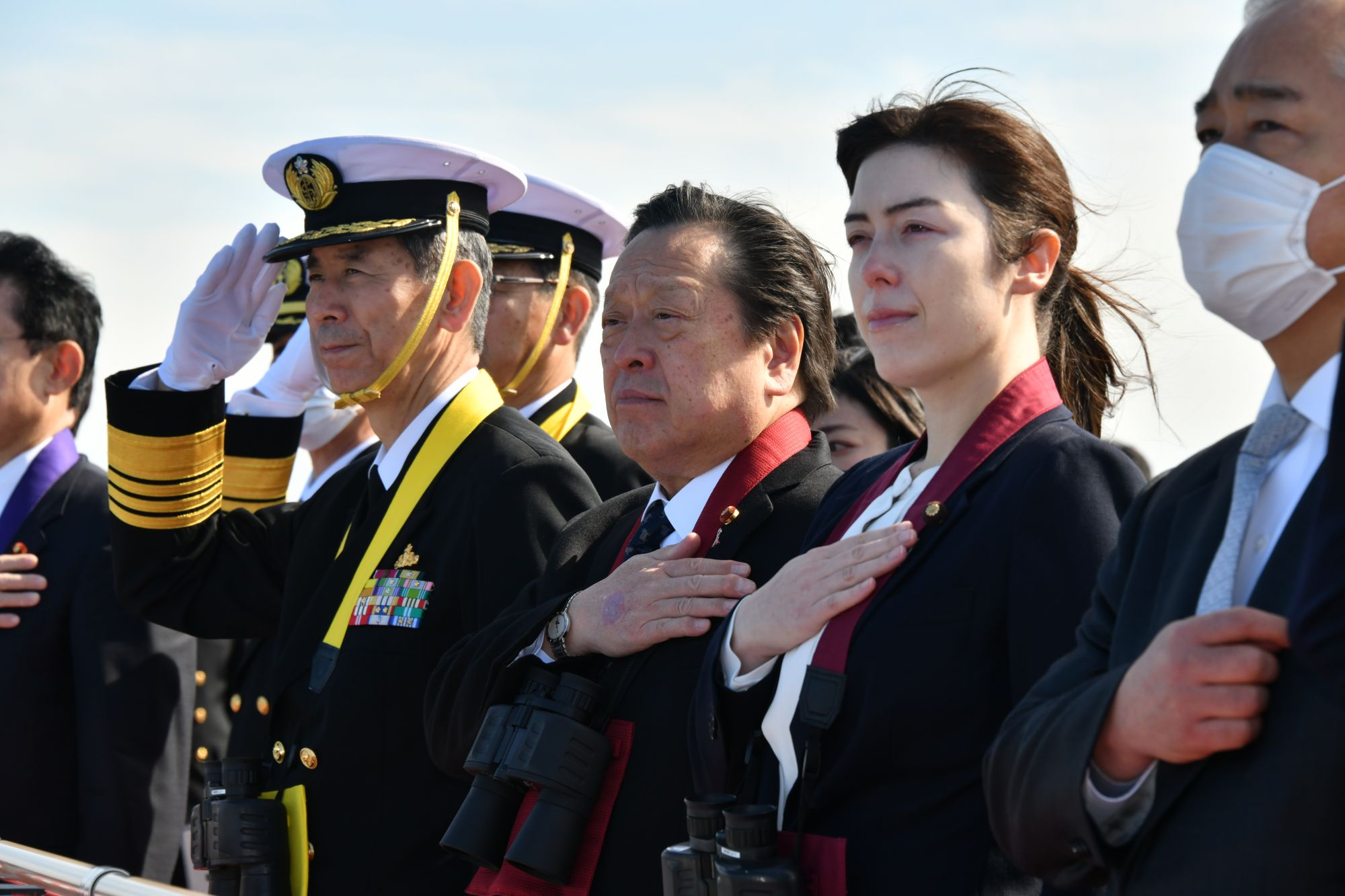
Minister of Defense Yasukazu Hamada (center) and Parliamentary Vice-Minister for Defense Onoda attending the International Fleet Review. (2022)

On August 12, 2022, she was appointed Parliamentary Vice-Minister of Defense in the Second Kishida Cabinet reshuffle.

In October 2025, she was appointed Minister in charge of Economic Security and Minister in charge of a Society of Well-Ordered and Harmonious Coexistence with Foreign Nationals

== Policies and advocacy ==
=== Constitution ===
- Regarding constitutional revision, Onoda answered "in favor" in 2022 NHK and Mainichi Shimbun questionnaires.
- Regarding the revision of Article 9, she commented "the Constitution should be revised to clearly state the existence of the Self-Defense Forces" in a 2022 Mainichi Shimbun questionnaire. Regarding the inclusion of the Self-Defense Forces in Article 9, she answered "in favor" in a 2022 NHK questionnaire.
- Onoda answered "in favor" regarding amending the Constitution to include an emergency clause in a 2022 NHK questionnaire.

=== Diplomacy and security ===
- Regarding having the capability to attack an enemy base, Onoda answered "in favor" in a 2022 NHK and Mainichi Shimbun questionnaire.
- Regarding the relocation of Marine Corps Air Station Futenma to Henoko, she answered "in favor" in a 2022 Mainichi Shimbun questionnaire.
- Regarding the Japanese government's sanctions against Russia amidst the 2022 Russian invasion of Ukraine, she responded "appropriate" in a 2022 NHK questionnaire.
- In response to the question, "What do you think should be done about defense spending in the future?" she answered, "it should be increased significantly" in a 2022 NHK questionnaire.

=== Gender ===
- Onoda did not respond regarding the introduction of marriage with separate surnames in 2022 NHK and Mainichi Shimbun questionnaires. She responded "undecided" in a survey by Nippon TV in the same year.
- She did not respond regarding legal revisions to allow same-sex marriage in 2022 NHK and Mainichi Shimbun questionnaires. She responded "somewhat opposed" in a survey by Nippon TV in the same year.
- She responded "somewhat opposed" to the introduction of a quota system in a 2022 NHK questionnaire.

== Dual citizenship issue ==
At birth, Onoda did not have Japanese citizenship due to Japan's nationality law, which adopted a paternal-preferential lineage system at the time, but she later became a Japanese citizen. In October 2015, Onoda completed the procedures to select Japanese citizenship over her U.S. citizenship in Japan, and ran for the House of Councillors in 2016.

However, on October 4, 2016, after the election, it was discovered that she had not completed the renunciation procedure in the U.S., which the Nationality Law imposes an effort requirement, and that she was in a dual nationality status. Therefore, as Onoda was illegally elected, under the Japanese constitution, she would have been ineligible to become a member of parliament. Onoda apologized for her lack of knowledge and said that she was proceeding with the procedures because it turned out that she also needed to apply to the U.S. government to renounce her U.S. citizenship. She then posted on her Facebook and Twitter pages the "Certificate of Loss of U.S. Citizenship" received on May 2, 2017.

Onoda commented on then Democratic Party Representative Renhō's refusal to release her family register, which was in question at the same time over the issue of multiple nationality, saying, "The only thing that can prove that you are not violating the Nationality Law is a copy of your family register that shows the date of selection of your nationality. No one is talking about roots or discrimination." Onoda also criticized Renhō for calling those who demanded the publication of her family register "racist" saying that she "created a conflict between those who have foreign blood and those who do not."

== Affiliations ==
- The Conference to Japan's Dignity and National Interest (Executive Secretary)
- LDP Diet Members Caucus for the Prevention of Passive Smoking
- Parliamentarians' League for Japan's Anime, Manga, and Games
