= 2004 Yamaguchi gubernatorial election =

Japanese gubernatorial election

- 8 August 2004
- Turnout: 38.22 ▼3.65
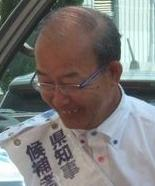

| Candidate | Sekinari Nii | Toshiki Fukue |
| Party | LDP | JCP |
| Popular vote | 371,247 | 90,512 |
| Percentage | 80.40% | 19,60% |
Governor before election
Sekinari Nii
LDP
Elected Governor
Sekinari Nii
LDP

The 2004 Yamaguchi gubernatorial election was held on 8 August 2004 to elect the next governor of Yamaguchi (山口県, Yamaguchi-ken), a prefecture of Japan in the Chūgoku region of the main island of Honshu.

== Candidates ==
The candidates were:

- Sekinari Nii, 61, elected in 1996 and 2000, endorsed by LDP, DPJ and New Komeito.
- Toshiki Fukue, 63, former chairman of the prefectural chapter of the Labour federation, for the JCP.

== Results ==
Yamaguchi gubernatorial 2018
| Party | Candidate | Votes | % | ±% |
|---|---|---|---|---|
| LDP | Sekinari Nii * | 371,247 | 80.40 | ▼0.20 |
| JCP | Toshiki Fukue | 90,512 | 19,60 | ▲0.20 |
| Turnout | | 467.573 | 38,22 ▼3.65 | |
| Registered electors | | 1,223,321 | | |
| LDP hold | | Swing | | |
