= Yumiko Himei =

Japanese politician

- 姫井 由美子
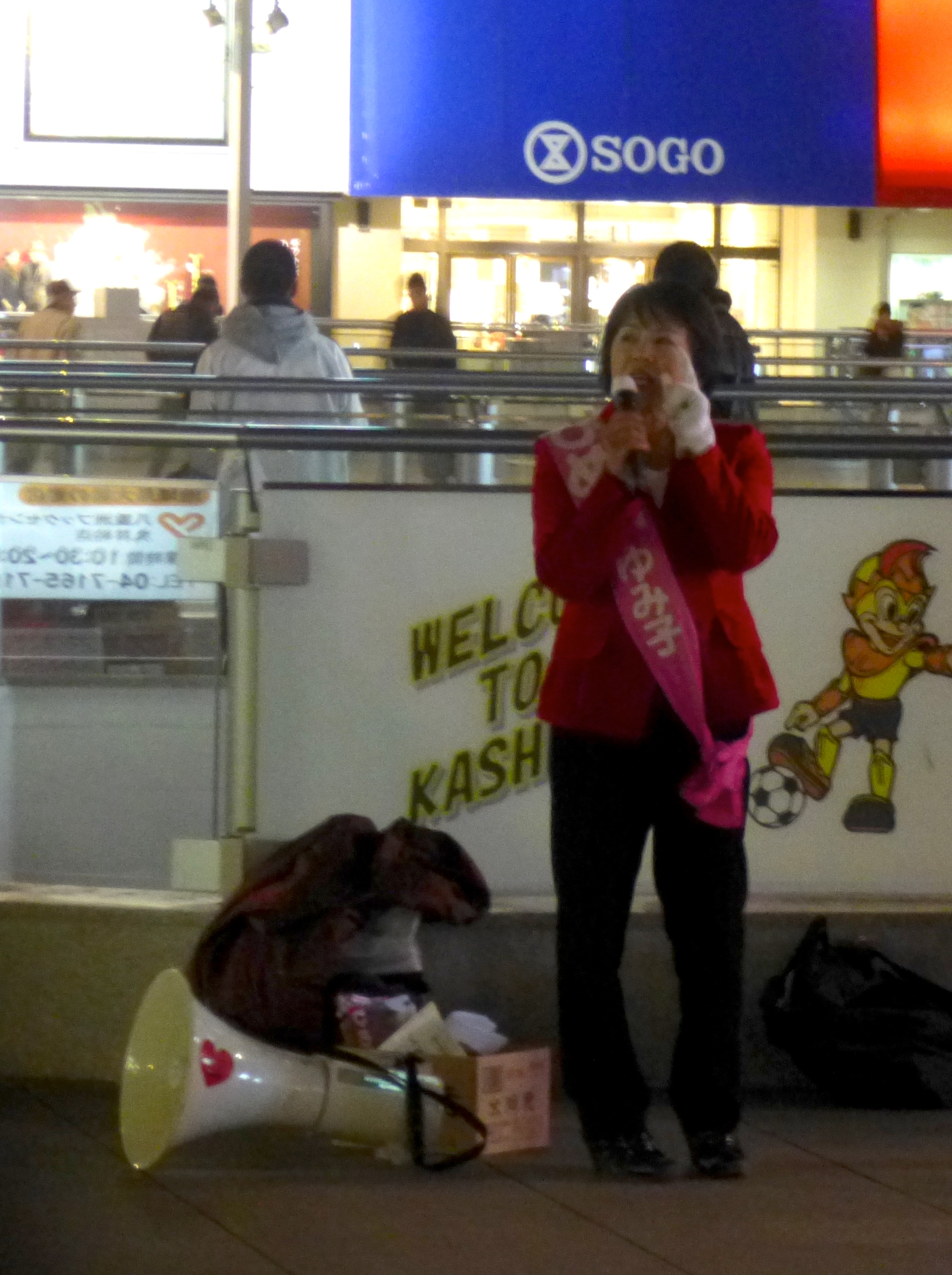
- Himei campaigning in front of Kashiwa Station

Member of the House of Councillors
- In office 29 July 2007 – 4 December 2012
- Preceded by: Toranosuke Katayama
- Succeeded by: Masahiro Ishii
- Constituency: Okayama at-large

Member of the Okayama Prefectural Assembly
- In office 1999–2007
- Constituency: Okayama City

Personal details
- Born: 14 February 1959 (age 67) Naka-ku, Okayama, Japan
- Party: CDP (since 2020)
- Other political affiliations: DPJ (1999–2012); PLF (2012); TPJ (2012–2013); LP (2013–2018); DPP (2018–2020)
- Education: Okayama University

Yumiko Himei (姫井 由美子, Himei Yumiko; born February 14, 1959) is a former Japanese politician of the Democratic Party of Japan, a member of the House of Councillors in the Diet (national legislature). A native of Okayama, she graduated from Okayama University with a master's degree. She was elected to the House of Councillors for the first time in 2007 after serving in the assembly of Okayama Prefecture for two terms since 1999.

She was due to join a new political party, "Kaikaku Club", in 2008, but on August 28, 2008, she withdrew her membership in the new party and reaffirmed her loyalty to the Democratic Party of Japan.

== TV appearances ==
- TV Tackle (TV Asahi) - 31 March 2007
- Hōdō 2001 (Fuji Television) - 12 August 2007
- Kin SMA (TBS) - 29 December 2007
- TV Tackle (TV Asahi) - 31 March 2008
