= Okayama at-large district =

Japan House of Councillors constituency

- 岡山県選挙区
- Parliamentary constituency for the House of Councillors
- Prefecture: Okayama
- Electorate: 1,550,291 (as of September 2022)

Current constituency
- Created: 1947
- Seats: 2
- Councillors: Class of 2022: Kimi Onoda (LDP); Class of 2025: Kōichirō Kobayashi (LDP)

The Okayama at-large district is a constituency in the House of Councillors of Japan, the upper house of the Diet of Japan (national legislature). It currently elects 2 members to the House of Councillors, one per election. The current representatives are:

- Kimi Onoda, first elected in 2016. Term ends in 2028. Member of the Liberal Democratic Party.
- Kōichirō Kobayashi, first elected in 2025. Term ends in 2031. Member of the Liberal Democratic Party.

The district has an electorate of 1,578,647 as of May 2021.

== Members elected to House of Councillors ==
Class of (1947/1953/...)		Election	Class of (1950/1956/...)	
#1 1947: #1, 6 Year Term	#2 1947: #2, 6 Year Term		#1 1947: #3, 3 Year Term	#2 1947: #4 3 Year Term
Gunji Shimamura (Indep.)	Hideo Kuroda (LP)	1947	Toshie Ota (JSP)	Katsuji Itano (JCP)
Gunji Shimamura (Indep.)	Hideo Kuroda (LP)	1950	Saburō Eda (JSP)	Takenori Kato (Yoshida LP)
Chozo Akiyama (Left JSP)	Gunji Shimamura (Ryokufūkai)	1953	Saburō Eda (JSP)	Takenori Kato (Yoshida LP)
Chozo Akiyama (Left JSP)	Gunji Shimamura (Ryokufūkai)	1956	Saburō Eda (JSP)	Tsuyuro Kondo (LDP)
Chozo Akiyama (JSP)	Takenori Kato (LDP)	1959	Saburō Eda (JSP)	Tsuyuro Kondo (LDP)
Chozo Akiyama (JSP)	Takenori Kato (LDP)	1962	Yusaku Yayama (JSP)	Tsuyuro Kondo (LDP)
Chozo Akiyama (JSP)	Mutsuo Kimura (Indep.)	1964 by-el.	Yusaku Yayama (JSP)	Tsuyuro Kondo (LDP)
Chozo Akiyama (JSP)	Mutsuo Kimura (LDP)	1965	Yusaku Yayama (JSP)	Tsuyuro Kondo (LDP)
Chozo Akiyama (JSP)	Mutsuo Kimura (LDP)	1968	Kazuo Koeda (LDP)	Yusaku Yayama (JSP)
Chozo Akiyama (JSP)	Mutsuo Kimura (LDP)	1971	Kazuo Koeda (LDP)	Yusaku Yayama (JSP)
Chozo Akiyama (JSP)	Mutsuo Kimura (LDP)	1974	Takenori Kato (LDP)	Kumao Terada (JSP)
Mutsuo Kimura (LDP)	Chozo Akiyama (JSP)	1977	Takenori Kato (LDP)	Kumao Terada (JSP)
Mutsuo Kimura (LDP)	Chozo Akiyama (JSP)	1980	Takenori Kato (LDP)	Kumao Terada (JSP)
Mutsuo Kimura (LDP)	Chozo Akiyama (JSP)	1983	Takenori Kato (LDP)	Kumao Terada (JSP)
Mutsuo Kimura (LDP)	Chozo Akiyama (JSP)	1986	Takenori Kato (LDP)	Junji Ichī (Indep.)
Toranosuke Katayama (LDP)	Nobuko Mori (JSP)	1989	Takenori Kato (LDP)	Junji Ichī (Indep.)
Toranosuke Katayama (LDP)	Nobuko Mori (JSP)	1992	Norifumi Kato (LDP)	Junji Ichī (JSP)
Toranosuke Katayama (LDP)	Mie Ishida (NFP)	1995	Norifumi Kato (LDP)	Junji Ichī (JSP)
Toranosuke Katayama (LDP)	Mie Ishida (NFP)	1998	Satsuki Eda (DPJ)	Norifumi Kato (LDP)
Toranosuke Katayama (LDP)		2001	Satsuki Eda (DPJ)	Norifumi Kato (LDP)
Toranosuke Katayama (LDP)		2004	Satsuki Eda (DPJ)	
Yumiko Himei (DPJ)		2007	Satsuki Eda (DPJ)	
Yumiko Himei (DPJ)		2010	Satsuki Eda (DPJ)	
Masahiro Ishii (LDP)		2013	Satsuki Eda (DPJ)	
Masahiro Ishii (LDP)		2016	Kimi Onoda (LDP)	
Masahiro Ishii (LDP)		2019	Kimi Onoda (LDP)	
Masahiro Ishii (LDP)		2022	Kimi Onoda (LDP)	
Kōichirō Kobayashi (LDP)		2025	Kimi Onoda (LDP)	
