= Satsuki Eda =

Japanese politician (1941–2021)

- 江田 五月
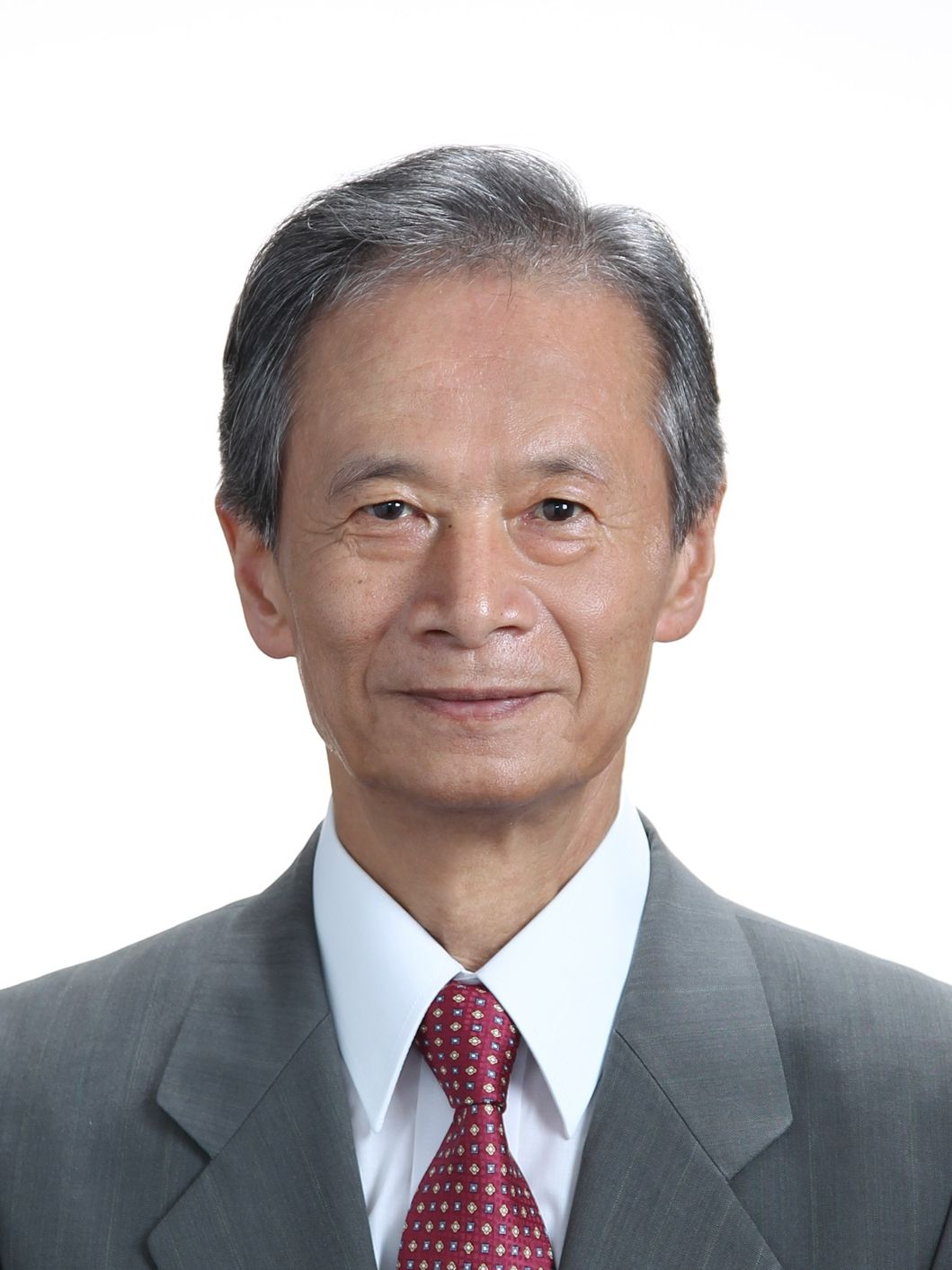
- Official portrait, 2010

Minister of the Environment
- In office 27 June 2011 – 2 September 2011
- Prime Minister: Naoto Kan
- Preceded by: Ryu Matsumoto
- Succeeded by: Goshi Hosono

Minister of Justice
- In office 14 January 2011 – 2 September 2011
- Prime Minister: Naoto Kan
- Preceded by: Yoshito Sengoku
- Succeeded by: Hideo Hiraoka

President of the House of Councillors
- In office 28 July 2007 – 25 July 2010
- Monarch: Akihito
- Vice President: Akiko Santō
- Preceded by: Chikage Oogi
- Succeeded by: Takeo Nishioka

Director-General of the Science and Technology Agency
- In office 9 August 1993 – 28 April 1994
- Prime Minister: Morihiro Hosokawa
- Preceded by: Shōichi Watanabe
- Succeeded by: Mikio Ōmi

President of the Socialist Democratic Federation
- In office 10 February 1985 – 22 May 1994
- Preceded by: Hideo Den
- Succeeded by: Position abolished

Member of the House of Councillors
- In office 26 July 1998 – 25 July 2016
- Preceded by: Norifumi Kato
- Succeeded by: Kimi Onoda
- Constituency: Okayama at-large
- In office 10 July 1977 – 10 July 1983
- Preceded by: Multi-member district
- Succeeded by: Constituency abolished
- Constituency: National district

Member of the House of Representatives
- In office 19 December 1983 – 27 September 1996
- Preceded by: Hideo Aizawa
- Succeeded by: Constituency abolished
- Constituency: Okayama 1st

Personal details
- Born: 22 May 1941 Okayama, Japan
- Died: 28 July 2021 (aged 80) Okayama, Japan
- Party: Democratic (1998–2016)
- Other political affiliations: SDF (1977–1994); JNP (1994); NFP (1994–1996); Independent (1996–1998); DP (2016–2017); CDP (2017–2021)
- Parent: Saburō Eda (father)

Satsuki Eda (江田 五月, Eda Satsuki; 22 May 1941 – 28 July 2021) was a Japanese politician who was the first opposition member to serve as the President of the House of Councillors from 2007 to 2010. Eda had served for three terms in the House of Councillors before his election as president on 7 August 2007, after the success of the Democratic Party in the July 2007 election for the Japanese House of Councillors. He had earlier served four terms in the House of Representatives from 1983 to 1996. Eda was also the head of the Science and Technology Agency.

== Early life and education ==
Eda graduated the University of Tokyo having passed the Japanese bar examination while studying in its law faculty. He elected to serve as a judge while undergoing training at the Legal Research and Training Institute, and worked as an assistant judge in Tokyo, Chiba and Yokohama. In 1969, he won a government scholarship to attend Linacre College, Oxford (together with then-Finance Ministry bureaucrat Haruhiko Kuroda, who went on to head the Bank of Japan).

== Political career ==
Eda's father, Socialist Democratic Federation co-founder Saburō Eda, died unexpectedly in May 1977, on the eve of a Japanese House of Councillors election in July. Eda was quickly enlisted as a SDF at-large candidate to take his father's place, and won a seat. He served until July 1983, when he declined to run in the House of Councillors election that year and instead stood in the Japanese general election in December, where he won a seat representing the Okayama 1st District. He held this seat until 1996, when he resigned to unsuccessfully run for Governor of Okayama Prefecture. From 1985 to 1994 he was the president of the Socialist Democratic Federation.

Eda returned to the House of Councillors in the 1998 election as a member of the Democratic Party of Japan. He served in the upper house until 2016, when he retired from politics at the age of 74. He died of pneumonia on 28 July 2021 at the age of 80.

Party political offices
Preceded by Saburō Eda	President of the Socialist Citizen's Federation; 1977–1978	Merged into Social Democratic Federation
Preceded by Hideo Den	President of the Socialist Democratic Federation; 1985–1994	Party dissolved
House of Councillors
New constituency	Councillor for Japan; 1977–1983	Constituency abolished
Preceded by Norifumi Katō; Junji Ichii	Councillor for Okayama; 1998–2016; Served alongside: Norifumi Katō	Succeeded by Kimi Onoda
Preceded by Chikage Ōgi	President of the House of Councillors; 2007–2010	Succeeded by Takeo Nishioka
House of Representatives (Japan)
Preceded by Takeo Hiranuma; Hideo Aizawa; Yūsaku Yayama; Jōji Ōmura; Tarō Yamada	Member of the House of Representatives for Okayama 1st district 1983–1996; Served alongside: Ichirō Aisawa, Takeo Hiranuma, Katsuyuki Hikasa, Akihiko Kumashiro, Keisuke Tanimura, Jōji Ōmura, Yūsaku Yayama	Constituency abolished
Political offices
Preceded by Shōichi Watanabe	Chairperson of the Science and Technology Agency; 1993–1994	Succeeded by Mikio Ōmi
Preceded by Yoshito Sengoku	Minister of Justice; 14 January – 2 September 2011	Succeeded by Hideo Hiraoka
Preceded by Ryu Matsumoto	Minister of the Environment; 27 June – 2 September 2011	Succeeded by Goshi Hosono
