= Minoru Kiuchi =

Japanese politician

- 城内 実
- Official portrait, 2024

Minister of State for Economic and Fiscal Policy
- Incumbent
- Assumed office 21 October 2025
- Prime Minister: Sanae Takaichi
- Preceded by: Ryosei Akazawa

Minister of State for Economic Security
- In office 1 October 2024 – 21 October 2025
- Prime Minister: Shigeru Ishiba
- Preceded by: Sanae Takaichi
- Succeeded by: Kimi Onoda

Member of the House of Representatives
- Incumbent
- Assumed office 1 September 2009
- Preceded by: Satsuki Katayama
- Constituency: Shizuoka 7th
- In office 11 November 2003 – 8 August 2005
- Preceded by: Hiroshi Kumagai
- Succeeded by: Satsuki Katayama
- Constituency: Shizuoka 7th

Personal details
- Born: 19 April 1965 (age 61) Shinjuku, Tokyo, Japan
- Party: LDP (2003–2005; since 2012)
- Other political affiliations: Independent (until 2003; 2005–2012)
- Education: University of Tokyo
- Profession: Politician; Former MOFA official
- Awards: Great Cross of Merit of the Federal Republic of Germany; Commander by Number of the Order of Civil Merit (Spain)
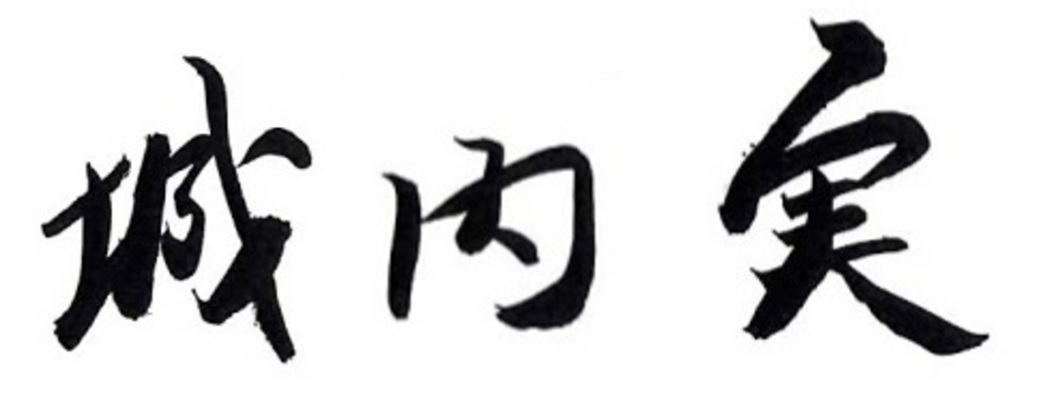
- Signature
- Website: Minoru Kiuchi Official Website (in Japanese)

Minoru Kiuchi (城内 実, Kiuchi Minoru; born 19 April 1965) is a Japanese politician and former Ministry of Foreign Affairs official who has served as Minister of State for Economic and Fiscal Policy since October 2025. He is a member of the House of Representatives from Liberal Democratic Party. He has served as state minister for foreign affairs and state minister for the environment. Kiuchi is known for his close ties with Germany and his German language skills. He was a member of the Moriyama Faction until its dissolution in January 2024.

== Early life and career ==
=== Upbringing and education ===
Minoru Kiuchi grew up as the son of Japanese police officer and later Commissioner General of the National Police Agency Yasumitsu Kiuchi. As a result of his father's appointment as police attaché to the Japanese embassy in Bonn, West Germany, between 1971 and 1975, Minoru Kiuchi lived in Germany between ages six and ten. He attended Gotenschule elementary school in Bad Godesberg, where he took classes in German exclusively.

Upon his return to Japan, Kiuchi attended various schools in Kobe, Tokyo, and Yokohama. In 1984, he completed his secondary education at Kaisei Academy and enrolled in the University of Tokyo's College of Arts and Sciences, where he majored in international relations.

=== Ministry of Foreign Affairs official ===
In 1989, Kiuchi entered the Japanese Ministry of Foreign Affairs, by which, in 1990, he was sent to the University of Augsburg, where he studied political science and worked on further improving his German. Starting in 1992, Kiuchi was deployed as a diplomat at the Japanese embassy in Germany for three years. At this time - the fall of the Berlin Wall and Germany's subsequent reunification only just having come to pass -, the embassy was still located in Bonn, the capital of West Germany. Between 1996 and 2000 Kiuchi served as the official German-Japanese interpreter of Emperor Akihito, as well as prime ministers Ryutaro Hashimoto and Keizō Obuchi.

=== Independent politician ===
In November 2002, exactly one year ahead of the regular general elections of November 2003, Kiuchi resigned from his post at the foreign ministry to pursue a career in national politics. In 2003, he successfully ran for office as an independent candidate in Shizuoka prefecture's electoral district no. 7, which comprises primarily about half of Hamamatsu, and which has remained his electoral district ever since. Once a member of the lower house, Kiuchi joined the LDP. After two years as a member of the LDP, he defied then prime minister Junichiro Koizumi in his privatization efforts and consequently lost favor with the LDP's leadership (see 4.1). In the snap election of 2005, Kiuchi, once again, ran for office as an independent candidate but was defeated. One month later he left the LDP. He was appointed to a visiting professor at Takushoku University following years.

For the next four years, Kiuchi prepared himself for the 2009 election by reaching out to the community and rallying support. During this time he kept himself and his family afloat by doing various jobs such as working as a part-time teacher at a Kanagawa high school. In his autobiography, Kiuchi describes these years as having been particularly formative for him as a politician. He says that they gave him the opportunity to speak with constituents in even the most remote parts of his electoral district and that "the economic hardship [he experienced] made him pick up a habit of keeping his feet busy." In 2009, he was re-elected as an independent candidate. At the time, The Asahi Shimbun described Kiuchi's victory as overwhelming. It did so based on the fact that he had not only prevailed as an independent candidate over the candidates fielded by the two established parties, the LDP and the DPJ, but that he had also received more than twice as many votes as Takeshi Saiki, the candidate who came in second (see table).

Kiuchi is one of just a few Japanese politicians with a track record as a successful nonpartisan candidate. In the elections in which he ran as an independent, merely 11 (2003), 6 (2005), and 6 (2009) out of 480 seats went to nonpartisan candidates. Two out of these three candidacies saw Kiuchi successfully claim a seat. In the third (2005), he lost by a margin of merely 748 votes.

=== LDP politician ===
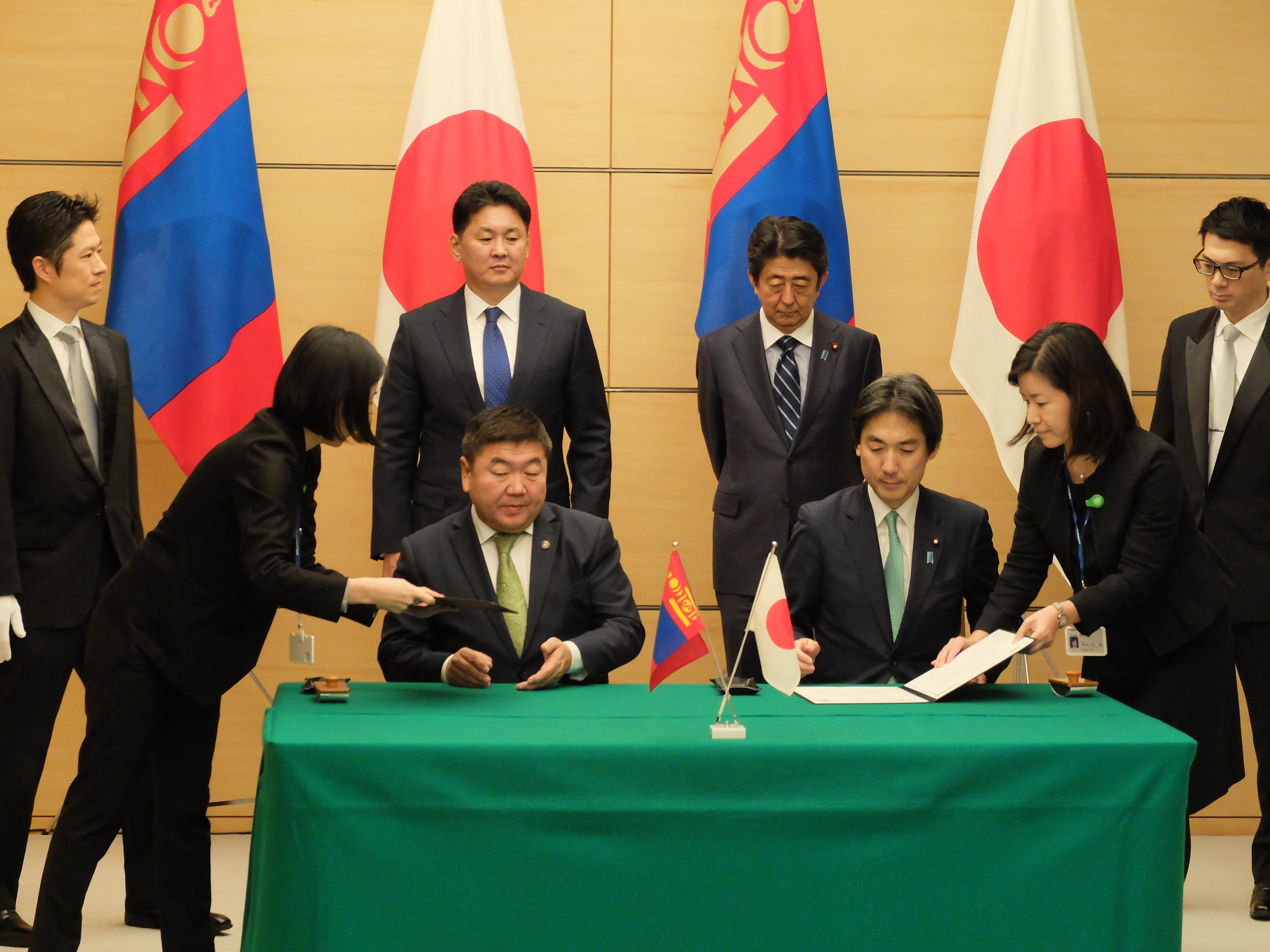
Kiuchi as State Minister for the Environment signing the Japanese-Mongolian Climate Agreement, December 2018

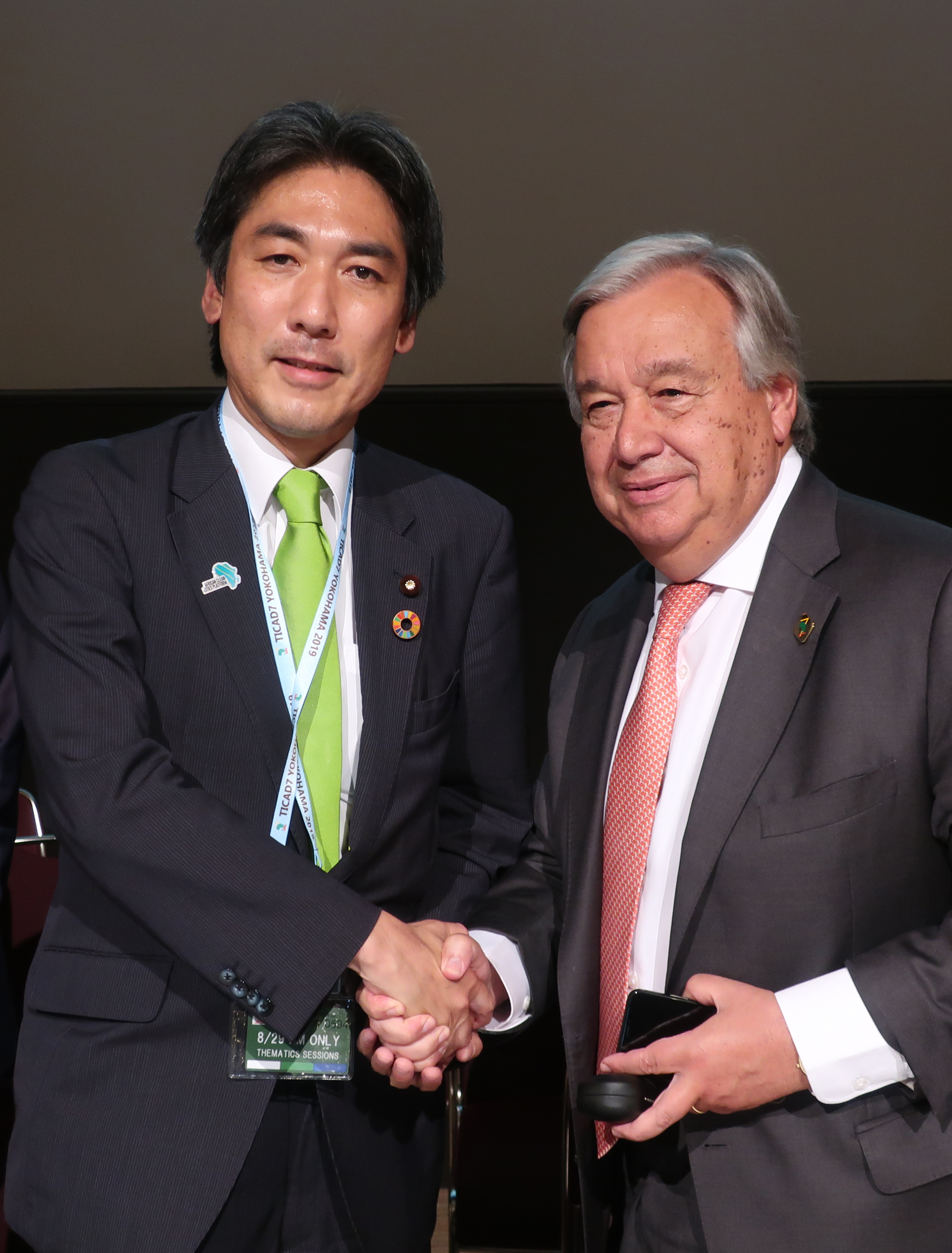
Kiuchi shaking hands with UN Secretary-General António Guterres at TICAD VII, August 2019

During the run-up to the 2012 elections, Kiuchi rejoined the LDP to support Shinzō Abe in his bid for the prime minister's office, remaining a supporter until Abe's resignation in 2020. In the Second Abe Cabinet formed in December 2012, Kiuchi was appointed parliamentary vice-minister for foreign affairs. When the cabinet was reshuffled in September 2014, Kiuchi was promoted to state minister for foreign affairs, a post he retained through the inauguration of the Third Abe Cabinet until October 2015. Between 2015 and 2018, Kiuchi served in the executive of various parliamentary committees and internal LDP commissions, including the Parliamentary Committee on North Korean Abductions and Other Issues, the LDP International Bureau, the LDP Economy, Trade and Industry Division, and the LDP Information Research Bureau. Under the Fourth Abe Cabinet, Kiuchi served as the state minister for the environment from October 2018 until September 2019. In this capacity, he led the ministerial climate talks in Karuizawa, Nagano, as part of the 2019 G20 summit. Since October 2019, he has served as the deputy chairperson of the LDP's Diet Affairs Committee.

After his first stint as an LDP politician between 2003 and 2005, Kiuchi has consistently refused to join any of the LDP's factions. During the 2020 race for the premiership between Yoshihide Suga, Fumio Kishida, and Shigeru Ishiba, Kiuchi supported current prime minister Suga, who is equally not a member of any of the LDP's factions.

Lower house elections (Shizuoka prefecture, electoral district no. 7)
YEAR	FIRST	SECOND	THIRD
2017	Minoru Kiuchi (LDP) 65.80%	Takashi Fukumura (Party of Hope) 15.20%	Yūta Hiyoshi (CDP) 13.41%
2014	Minoru Kiuchi (LDP) 70.93%	Yasutaka Matsumoto (DPJ) 20.12%	Masaji Nozawa (JCP) 8.94%
2012	Minoru Kiuchi (LDP) 59.60%	Takeshi Saiki (DPJ) 19.24%	Jun'ichi Kawai (Your Party) 14.25%
2009	Minoru Kiuchi (independent) 52.09%	Takeshi Saiki (DPJ) 25.41%	Satsuki Katayama (LDP) 21.79%
2005	Satsuki Katayama (LDP) 36.77%	Minoru Kiuchi (independent) 36.45%	Takuya Abe (DPJ) 26.78%
2003	Minoru Kiuchi (independent) 46.78%	Hiroshi Kumagai (NCP) 27.88%	Michiko Higuchi (DPJ) 20.71%

== Notable Initiatives during Ministerial Tenure ==
=== Involvement in the Expo 2025 Osaka/Kansai ===
On May 2, 2025, Kiuchi, in his capacity as State Minister responsible for the Cool Japan Strategy, appeared in cosplay as Joe Shimamura, the protagonist of Cyborg 009 by manga artist Shōtarō Ishinomori, during a talk show at Expo 2025 Osaka/Kansai. The event was part of a government-organized cultural program aimed at promoting anime and manga to a global audience. Together with well-known cosplayer Enako, Kiuchi highlighted the potential of Japanese pop culture to revitalize regional areas and attract international tourism. He also emphasized the importance of combining high-quality content with the unique character of Japan's regions to strengthen the country's cultural and economic presence worldwide.:

=== Expanding German-Japanese Cooperation in High-Tech and Space Exploration ===
On June 26, 2025, Kiuchi, in his capacity as State Minister for Science and Technology Policy as well as for Space Policy, signed two significant bilateral agreements together with Germany's Federal Minister of Education and Research, Dorothee Bär.

By signing a Letter of Intent, both sides reaffirmed their commitment to deepening scientific cooperation. The focus lies on cutting-edge technological fields such as breakthrough innovations, quantum engineering, fusion power, and AI-driven robotics. In addition, the agreement aims to strengthen research security, scientific integrity, and academic freedom.

In the field of space exploration, the cooperation was renewed through a Joint Declaration of Intent. Kiuchi and Bär expressed their intention to continue advancing joint missions and projects—particularly in Earth observation and satellite communications.

== Political positions ==
On his official website Kiuchi describes his political positions as follows:

=== Economics ===
Kiuchi decries the increasing class divide in Japan, which he alleges was brought about by market fundamentalism and the undue dominance of large businesses at the expense of small- and medium-sized businesses. He blames this imbalance on overly close ties between the corporate and the political world and vows to remedy the situation by separating the spaces within which small and large businesses are meant to thrive. He aims to achieve this through government intervention.

=== Agriculture ===
Kiuchi calls for an expansion of Japan's primary sector, through which he intends to increase Japan's rate of food self-sufficiency of currently only 40% (based on caloric intake), preserve rural landscapes, make accessible new sources of fresh water, and secure areas otherwise prone to natural disasters such as landslides.

=== Environment ===
While affirming the necessity of solutions on a macro-level, such as R&D and the reduction of CO_{2} emissions and energy consumption, Kiuchi proposes further action on a local and individual level, such as recycling, volunteer activities, and a change in people's lifestyles and way of thinking. He criticizes biofuel for further decreasing Japan's food self-sufficiency.

=== Education ===
Kiuchi acknowledges the new challenges posed by globalization but asserts that, before Japanese children can become "citizens of the world," they must first receive a thorough education in the Japanese language and Japanese history.

=== Foreign policy ===
Kiuchi describes the region of East Asia as being key to the achievement of world peace. He advocates for the international rule of law but also stresses the importance of maintaining friendly relations with major powers such as the United States and China, without foregoing the opportunity to build new relations with India and Russia. He further points out the need to strengthen relations with Europe, from which, he argues, Japan could learn much. Kiuchi calls for Japan to become a country that shows presence and does not shy away from responsibility on the global stage.

In a joint letter initiated by Norbert Röttgen and Anthony Gonzalez ahead of the 47th G7 summit in 2021, Kiuchi joined some 70 legislators from Europe and the US in calling upon their leaders to take a tough stance on China and to "avoid becoming dependent" on the country for technology including artificial intelligence and 5G.

=== Social policy ===
Kiuchi praises Japan's social security and health care institutions, which, he says, offer support to the weaker members of society and make advanced medical treatment available to everyone. He warns against the indiscriminate Americanization of Japanese institutions.

== Ties with Germany ==
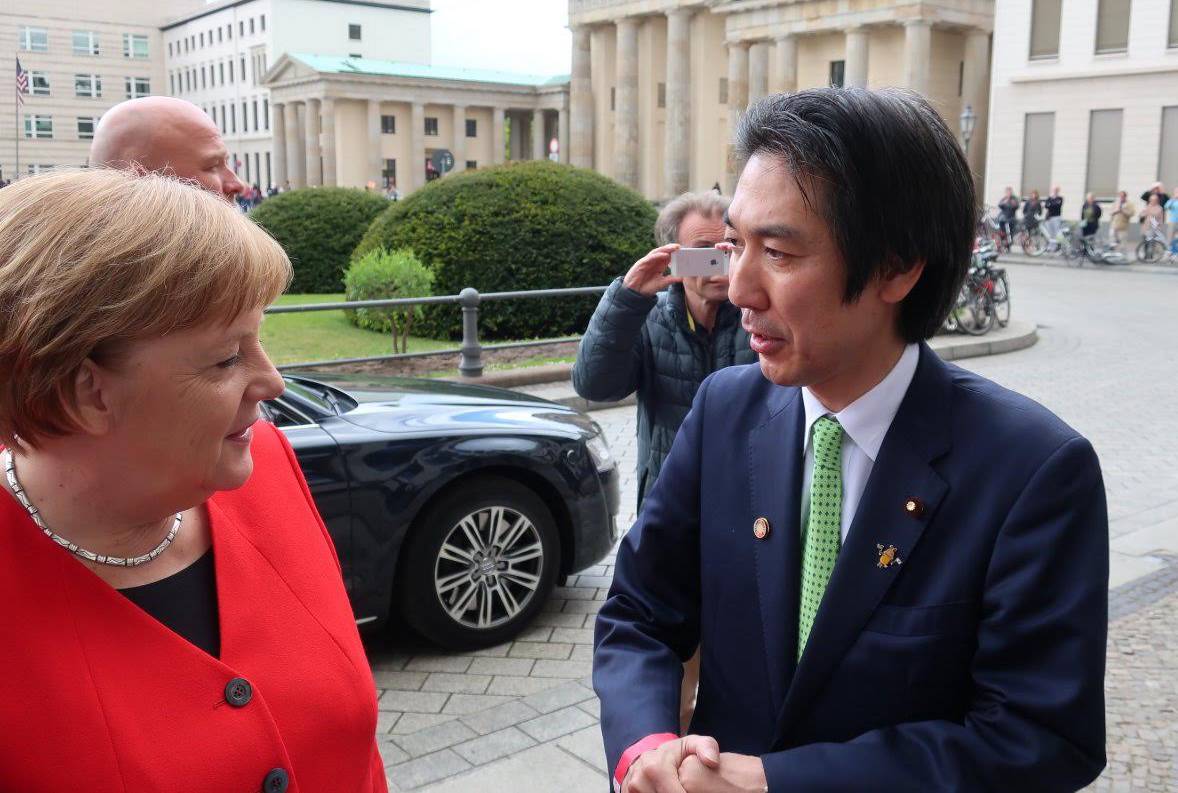
Kiuchi with German Chancellor Angela Merkel at the 70th anniversary of Germany's Basic Law, May 2019

Kiuchi spent part of his childhood in Bonn, Germany, studied in Augsburg, Germany, and has been posted as diplomat at the Japanese embassy in Bonn, Germany. In addition, he has served as the official German language interpreter of the Japanese Emperor and prime minister (see 1.1-1.2). Nowadays, he uses the German language skills he acquired during these years to maintain close relations with German dignitaries and to stay informed about German affairs. Kiuchi is the general-secretary of the German-Japanese Parliamentary Friendship Group. He regularly hosts German politicians in Japan, for whom he arranges meetings with their political counterparts, such as between parliamentary group leader Volker Kauder and Japanese prime minister Shinzō Abe in March 2018. Additionally, Kiuchi regularly travels to Germany himself. His website mentions meetings with, among others, Mark Hauptmann, Johann Wadephul, Matthias Bartke, and Christian Lindner.

== Significant events ==
=== Opposition to the privatization of Japan Post (2005) ===
In August 2019, retired senior politician Shizuka Kamei dedicated an issue of his serialized editorial on Japanese politics to Kiuchi's opposition to the privatization of Japan Post. In late 2005, prime minister Jun'ichirō Koizumi ran for re-election using slogans such as "from bureaucrats to the people (官から民へ)" and "where there is no reform, there is no growth (改革なくして成長なし)." Kiuchi staunchly opposed the privatization, despite being a member of Seiwa Seisaku Kenkyūkai, prime minister Koizumi's own faction within the LDP.

Kamei recounts how then deputy secretary-general of the LDP Shinzō Abe persistently attempted to persuade Kiuchi and how Kiuchi, for days on end, received phone calls from the LDP party leadership but refused to answer them. Resisting party-pressure, Kiuchi stood by his initial stance and voted against the privatization, which led to him temporarily parting ways with the LDP. In the snap election of September 2005, he was narrowly defeated by Satsuki Katayama, one of the Koizumi Children and a so-called assassin candidate, one of many candidates hand-picked by Koizumi to defeat fellow LDP lawmakers who had opposed his privatization efforts. One month later, in October 2005, Kiuchi left the LDP (which he rejoined in 2012).

Kamei characterizes Kiuchi as someone who stands by his convictions no matter what, praising him as "one of just a few members of the Japanese Diet with backbone."

=== Algerian hostage crisis (2013) ===
Kiuchi was visiting Europe in his capacity as parliamentary vice-minister for foreign affairs when the In Amenas hostage crisis erupted. After the Japanese government heard of the attack, Kiuchi was ordered to redirect his trip to Algeria to lead the negotiations on behalf of Japan. He arrived on site on January 17, 2013, one day after the attack had begun. Among the victims were 17 Japanese hostages, out of whom 10 died when Algeria unilaterally decided to storm the site. The rescue operation was initiated against the express wishes of Japan, the United States, and the United Kingdom, who had asked Algeria to place the lives of their abducted citizens first. Japan deplored that it had not been informed ahead of time and that its requests to halt the operation were ignored. Kiuchi negotiated directly with, inter alia, prime minister Sellal and foreign minister Medelci, spear-heading the common demand by eight of the affected nations, including Britain and France, that information be released expeditiously. He remained in Algeria until January 26 to oversee the identification of the Japanese citizens killed in the attack, as well as the repatriation of their remains. Upon his return, Kiuchi reported to prime minister Shinzō Abe and met with reporters. According to Kiuchi, he left most of the questions from the press unanswered out of concern for the bereaved.

== Future prospects ==
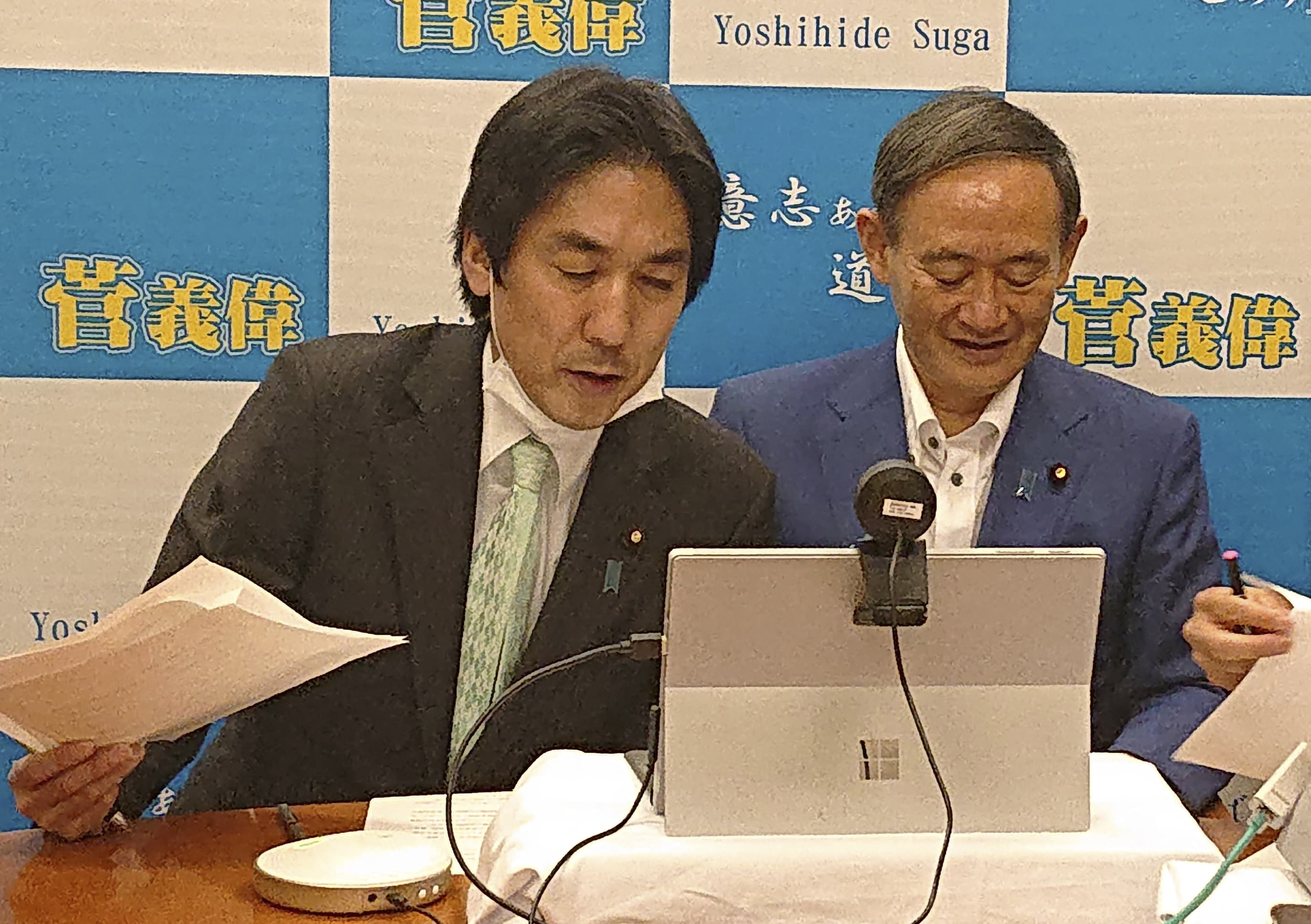
Kiuchi supporting Yoshihide Suga during his campaign for the premiership, September 2020

In October 2018, the Japanese periodical Shūkan Gendai ran an article, in which six political critics and two political journalists collectively analyzed all 706 members of the Japanese Diet to determine their aptitude and likelihood to become prime minister. The analysis was based on the criteria of "political prowess (政策力)," "practical prowess (実行力)," and "social prowess (人間力)." Minoru Kiuchi was given an A-score in all three categories and included in the Top Thirteen Lawmakers Most Likely to Become Prime Minister as the 12th most likely. The team of political commentators described Kiuchi as strong in both his actions and speech, as well as quick-witted thanks to his past experience as a diplomat. It further observed that, during elections, he had regularly supported newcomer candidates, as a result of which he is said to enjoy strong support from his younger party colleagues.

In 2020, an opinion piece featured in the American news magazine Newsweek described Kiuchi as a "top candidate" for the next race for the premiership.

== Personal life ==
Kiuchi is an avid collector of 78 rpm records. He writes about this hobby in his blog. During his time as a diplomat, he contributed articles to the small hobbyist magazine The Monday Critique (月曜評論). Along with Japanese and German, Kiuchi can speak English.

== Honours ==
- Germany: Commander's Cross of the Order of Merit of the Federal Republic of Germany
- Netherlands: Grand Officer of the Order of Orange-Nassau (29 October 2014)

== Selected publications ==
- Seijika no urajijō (政治家の裏事情, "Behind the Scenes of a Politician") - autobiography recounting Kiuchi's career up to its publication in 2012; ISBN 9784344021808
- Shin'nen Tsūshin (信念通信, "Conviction Transmission") - biannual periodical outlining Kiuchi's activities and political views, published as PDF via his official website

Political offices
Preceded by Sanae Takaichi	Minister of State for Science and Technology Policy; 2024–2025	Succeeded by Kimi Onoda
Preceded by Sanae Takaichi	Minister of State for Economic Security; 2024–2025	Succeeded by Kimi Onoda
Preceded by Sanae Takaichi	Minister of State for Intellectual Property Strategy; 2024–2025	Succeeded by Kimi Onoda
Preceded by Masaaki Taira	Minister of State for Regulatory Reform; 2025–2026	Succeeded by Hiroshi Nakatsuka
Preceded by Ryosei Akazawa	Minister of State for Economic and Fiscal Policy; 2025–present	Incumbent
