= Masahiro Ishii =

Japanese politician

- 石井 正弘
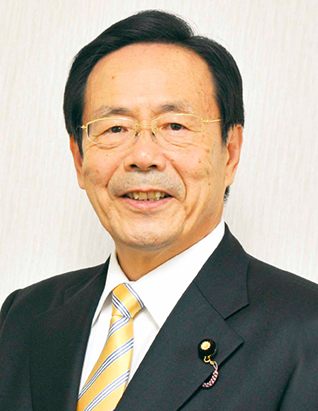
- Official portrait, 2021

Member of the House of Councillors
- In office 29 July 2013 – 28 July 2025
- Preceded by: Yumiko Himei
- Succeeded by: Kōichirō Kobayashi
- Constituency: Okayama at-large

Governor of Okayama Prefecture
- In office 12 November 1996 – 11 November 2012
- Monarch: Akihito
- Preceded by: Shirō Nagano
- Succeeded by: Ryuta Ibaragi

Personal details
- Born: 29 November 1945 (age 80) Higashi, Okayama, Japan
- Party: Liberal Democratic
- Education: University of Tokyo

Masahiro Ishii (石井 正弘, Ishii Masahiro; born November 29, 1945) is a former Japanese politician who served as the governor of Okayama Prefecture in Japan from November 1996 until November 2012. He then was elected as a member of the House of Councillors representing Okayama at-large district from 2013 until his retirement in 2025. A native of Okayama, Okayama and graduate of the University of Tokyo, he had worked at the Ministry of Construction since 1969 before being elected governor. Ishii was affiliated to the revisionist lobby Nippon Kaigi.
