= Killer Motel =

- Directed by: Kazuya Ogawa
- Produced by: Akira Yamaguchi
- Starring: Emi Ito; Akari Hoshino; Ren Ayase; Yuki Maeda
- Release date: 21 July 2012 (Japan)
- Running time: 70 minutes
- Country: Japan
- Language: Japanese

Killer Motel (キラー・モーテル) is a 2012 Japanese erotic horror film directed by Kazuya Ogawa.

== Cast ==
- Emi Ito
- Akari Hoshino
- Ren Ayase
- Yuki Maeda
- Jordon Cheung
