= Ryuta Ibaragi =

Japanese politician

Ryūta Ibaragi
- 伊原木 隆太
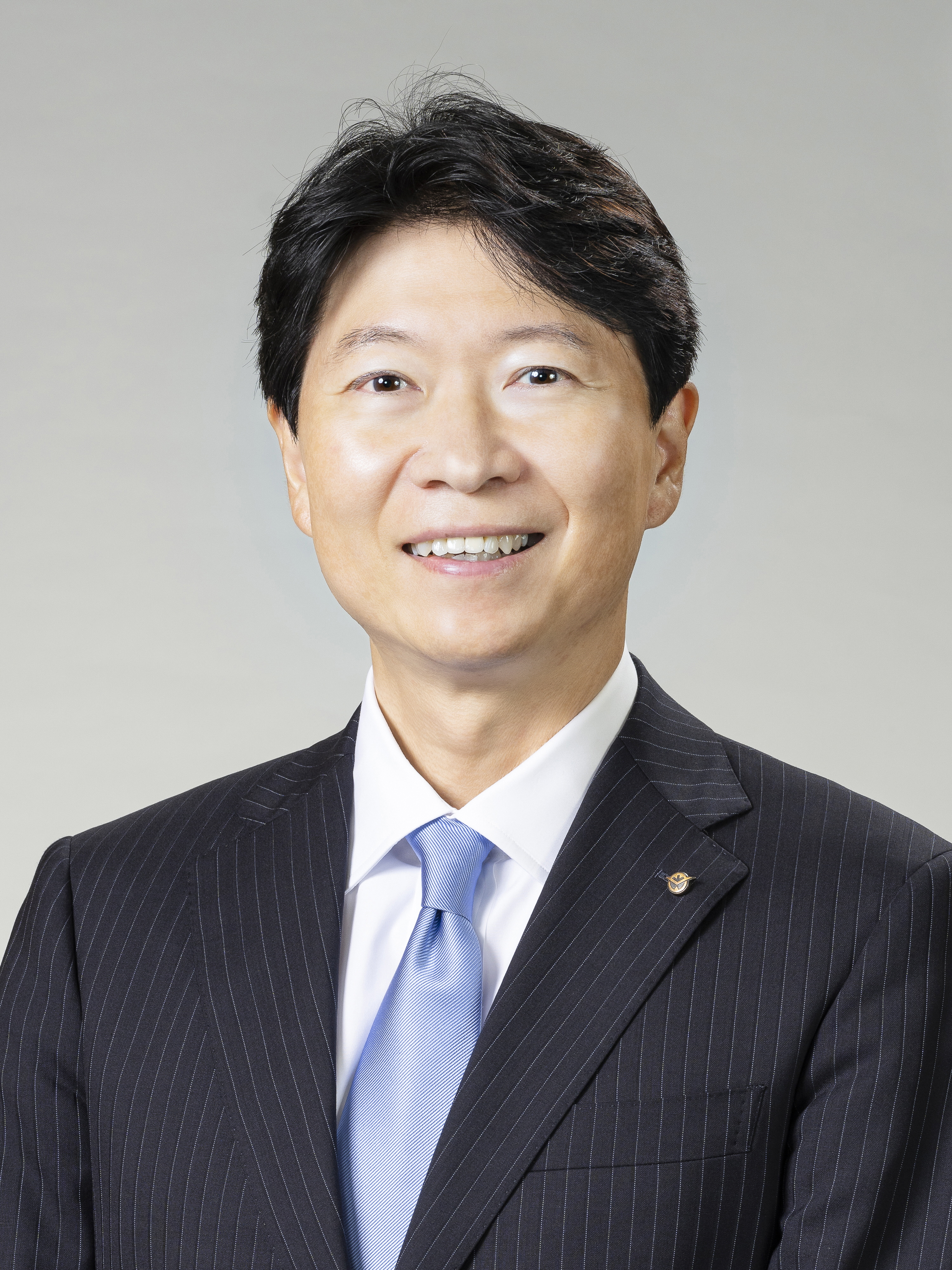

Governor of Okayama Prefecture
- Incumbent
- Assumed office 12 November 2012
- Monarchs: Akihito; Naruhito
- Preceded by: Masahiro Ishii

Personal details
- Born: 29 July 1966 (age 60) Okayama, Okayama Prefecture, Japan
- Education: University of Tokyo (B.E. in 1990); Stanford Graduate School of Business (MBA in 1995)

Ryūta Ibaragi (伊原木 隆太, Ibaragi Ryūta; born 29 July 1966) is a Japanese politician, businessman and the governor of Okayama Prefecture in Japan.

== Career ==
Ibaragi replaced his father, Ibaragi Kazue (Japanese: 伊原木 一衛), as president and representative director of Tenmaya. He has been company president for 14 years.

Ibaragi took office as Okayama Prefectural Governor in November 2012.
