= Sekinari Nii =

Japanese politician

- 二井 関成
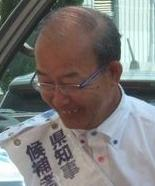
- Nii in 2009

Governor of Yamaguchi Prefecture
- In office 22 August 1996 – 21 August 2012
- Monarch: Akihito
- Preceded by: Tooru Hirai
- Succeeded by: Shigetarō Yamamoto

Personal details
- Born: 20 March 1943 (age 83) Mine, Yamaguchi, Japan
- Party: Independent
- Education: University of Tokyo

Sekinari Nii (二井 関成, Nii Sekinari; born 20 March 1943) is the former governor of Yamaguchi Prefecture in Japan.

== Biography ==
Sekinari Nii was born in Mine, Yamaguchi. He studied in University of Tokyo. After graduation in 1966, he started work in the Ministry of Home Affairs. He was elected as governor of Yamaguchi Prefecture in 1996.
