= 2011 in Japan =

- Decades: 1990s; 2000s; 2010s; 2020s; 2030s
- See also: Other events of 2011: History of Japan; Timeline; Years

This article lists events in 2011 in Japan.

== Incumbents ==
- Emperor – Akihito
- Prime Minister – Naoto Kan (D-Tokyo) until September 2, Yoshihiko Noda (D–Chiba)
- Chief Cabinet Secretary: Yoshito Sengoku until January 14, Yukio Edano until September 2, Osamu Fujimura
- Chief Justice of the Supreme Court: Hironobu Takesaki
- President of the House of Representatives: Takahiro Yokomichi (D–Hokkaidō)
- President of the House of Councillors: Takeo Nishioka (D–proportional) until November 5, Kenji Hirata (D–Gifu) from November 14
- Diet sessions: 177th (regular, January 24 to August 31), 178th (extraordinary, September 13 to September 30), 179th (extraordinary, October 20 to December 9)

=== Governors ===
- Aichi Prefecture: Masaaki Kanda (until 15 February); Hideaki Omura (starting 15 February)
- Akita Prefecture: Norihisa Satake
- Aomori Prefecture: Shingo Mimura
- Chiba Prefecture: Kensaku Morita
- Ehime Prefecture: Tokihiro Nakamura
- Fukui Prefecture: Issei Nishikawa
- Fukuoka Prefecture: Wataru Asō (until 22 April); Hiroshi Ogawa (starting 23 April)
- Fukushima Prefecture: Yūhei Satō
- Gifu Prefecture: Hajime Furuta
- Gunma Prefecture: Masaaki Osawa
- Hiroshima Prefecture: Hidehiko Yuzaki
- Hokkaido: Harumi Takahashi
- Hyogo Prefecture: Toshizō Ido
- Ibaraki Prefecture: Masaru Hashimoto
- Ishikawa Prefecture: Masanori Tanimoto
- Iwate Prefecture: Takuya Tasso
- Kagawa Prefecture: Keizō Hamada
- Kagoshima Prefecture: Satoshi Mitazono
- Kanagawa Prefecture: Shigefumi Matsuzawa (until 22 April); Yuji Kuroiwa (starting 23 April)
- Kochi Prefecture: Masanao Ozaki
- Kumamoto Prefecture: Ikuo Kabashima
- Kyoto Prefecture: Keiji Yamada
- Mie Prefecture: Akihiko Noro (until 20 April); Eikei Suzuki (starting 21 April)
- Miyagi Prefecture: Yoshihiro Murai
- Miyazaki Prefecture: Hideo Higashikokubaru (until 20 January); Shunji Kōno (starting 20 January)
- Nagano Prefecture: Shuichi Abe
- Nagasaki Prefecture: Hōdō Nakamura
- Nara Prefecture: Shōgo Arai
- Niigata Prefecture: Hirohiko Izumida
- Oita Prefecture: Katsusada Hirose
- Okayama Prefecture: Masahiro Ishii
- Okinawa Prefecture: Hirokazu Nakaima
- Osaka Prefecture:
  - until 31 October: Tōru Hashimoto
  - 31 October-28 November: Yasuyuki Ogawa
  - starting 20 November: Ichirō Matsui
- Saga Prefecture: Yasushi Furukawa
- Saitama Prefecture: Kiyoshi Ueda
- Shiga Prefecture: Yukiko Kada
- Shiname Prefecture: Zenbe Mizoguchi
- Shizuoka Prefecture: Heita Kawakatsu
- Tochigi Prefecture: Tomikazu Fukuda
- Tokushima Prefecture: Kamon Iizumi
- Tokyo: Shintarō Ishihara
- Tottori Prefecture: Shinji Hirai
- Toyama Prefecture: Takakazu Ishii
- Wakayama Prefecture: Yoshinobu Nisaka
- Yamagata Prefecture: Mieko Yoshimura
- Yamaguchi Prefecture: Sekinari Nii
- Yamanashi Prefecture: Shōmei Yokouchi

== Events ==
=== January ===
- January 14 – Prime Minister of Japan Naoto Kan reshuffles his Cabinet.
- January 22 – An unmanned Japanese H-II Transfer Vehicle HTV-2 Resupply craft was launched atop the H-IIB rocket on a mission to deliver cargo to the International Space Station.
- January 26 – Shinmoedake volcano erupts in Shinmoedake and the surrounding areas, continuing until no earlier than March 10, in southern Kyushu Island.

=== February ===
- February 6 – The Japan Sumo Association cancels the Spring Grand Sumo Tournament in light of a match fixing scandal, the first time the event has been canceled since 1946.
- February 26 – Nintendo's first 3D portable game console "Nintendo 3DS" is released in Japan.

=== March ===
- March 7 – Seiji Maehara resigns as Foreign Minister of Japan after becoming involved in an illegal political donation scandal.
- March 9 – Takeaki Matsumoto is sworn in as the Foreign Minister of Japan, replacing Seiji Maehara who resigned following a political donations scandal.
- March 11 – A 8.9-magnitude earthquake hits offshore of Japan's Miyagi prefecture, resulting in tsunami waves as high as 10 metres, causing an accident at Fukushima I Nuclear Power Plant
- March 12 – Kyushu Shinkansen opens between Yatsushiro and Hakata of Fukuoka, with the start of direct high-speed train between Osaka to Kagoshima.
- March 23 – Tokyo tap water became contaminated by radiation due to the Fukushima I nuclear accidents.
- March 23 – The Grand Bench of the Supreme Court rules that voting weight disparity in the 2009 general election for the House of Representatives was in an unconstitutional state.
- March 25 – Vegetables grown in Tokyo were contaminated by radiation.
- March 31 – The Grand Prince Hotel Akasaka was due to be closed on this date, but remained open through June 2011 to house people displaced by the earthquake, tsunami, and nuclear alert.

=== May ===
- May 4 – Osaka Station City, the largest enclosed shopping mall in Japan, including a cinema complex, a department store, and commercial facilities, opens in Osaka.
- May 10 – GoExPanda becomes Mascot of TV Asahi in Tokyo.
- May 12 – Worst heist in Japan: 604-million-yen robbery, in which a 36-year-old security company's workers are injured in Tachikawa, Tokyo. Six men are arrested on suspicion the heist on July 31.

=== July ===
- July 17 – The Japan women's national football team defeats the United States women's national football team on penalties, after a 2-2 extra-time scoreline, to win the 2011 FIFA Women's World Cup.
- July 21 – Tatsuya Ichihashi is sentenced to life in prison for the murder of Lindsay Hawker.
- July 24 – Analog television ceases operations in 44 of the 47 prefectures of Japan.

=== August ===
- August 15 – Japan's Cabinet approves a plan to establish a new energy watchdog under the Environment Ministry.
- August 26 – Naoto Kan announces his resignation as Prime Minister of Japan.

=== September ===
- September 2 – Yoshihiko Noda becomes Prime Minister of Japan.
- September 5 - Typhoon Talas, following massive rains and landslides in Kii Peninsula, resulting to death toll number of 94 persons.

=== October ===
- October 26 – Tsuyoshi Kikukawa resigns as the President and Chairman of Olympus Corporation, as financial and law enforcement bodies in Japan, the United States and the United Kingdom investigate the optical equipment company's acquisitions in recent years.

=== December ===
- December 23 – Rengō Kantai Shirei Chōkan: Yamamoto Isoroku was released.
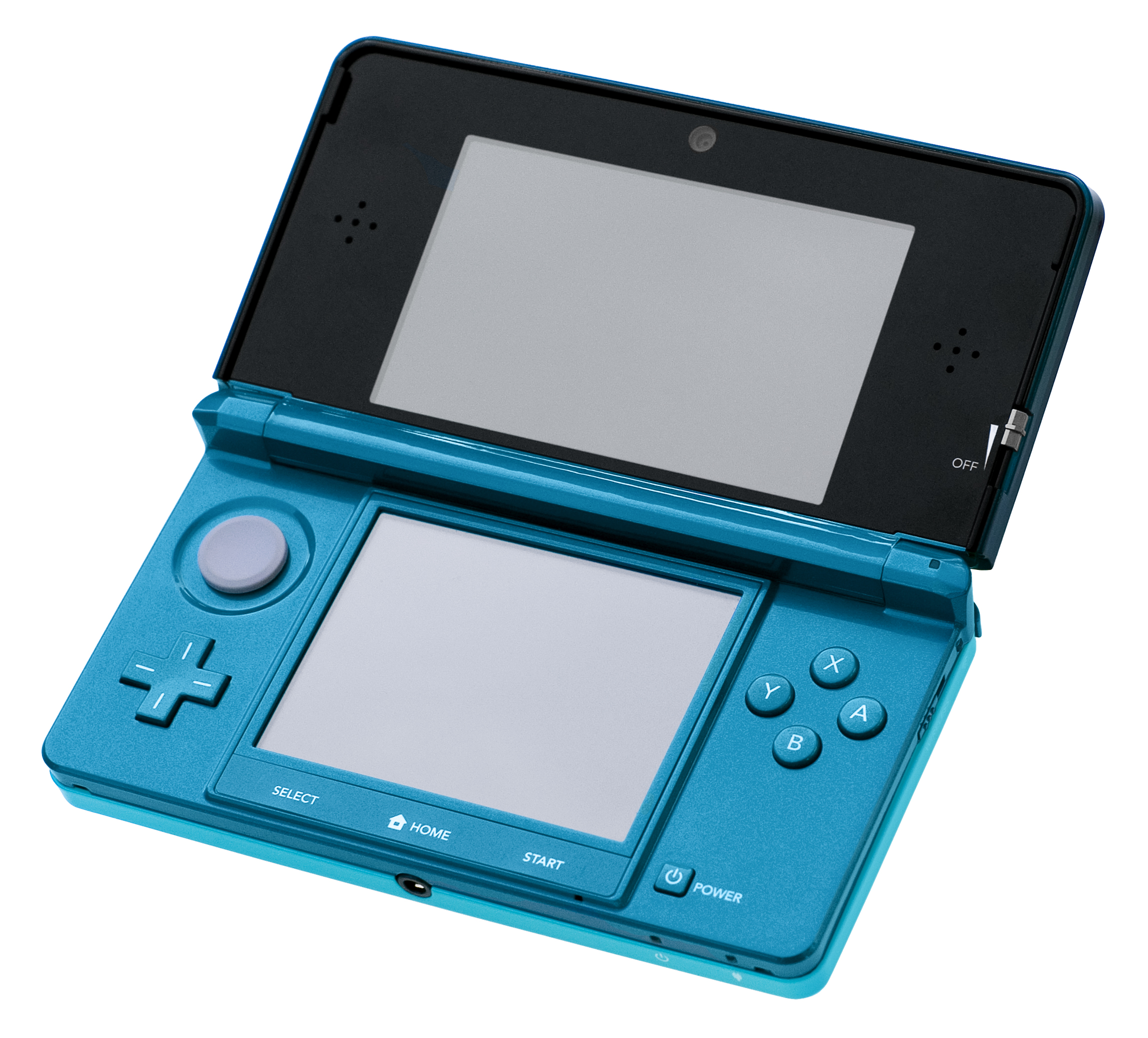
February 26: Nintendo's first 3D portable game console "Nintendo 3DS" is released in Japan

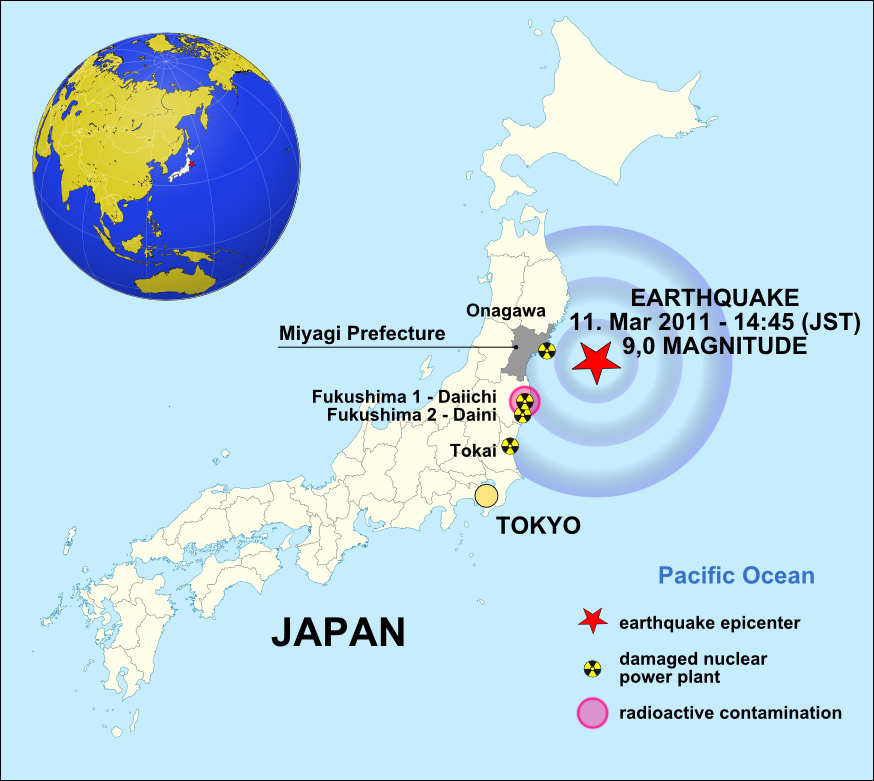
March 11: An 9.0 magnitude earthquake hits offshore of Japan's Miyagi prefecture, resulting in tsunami waves as high as 10 metres.

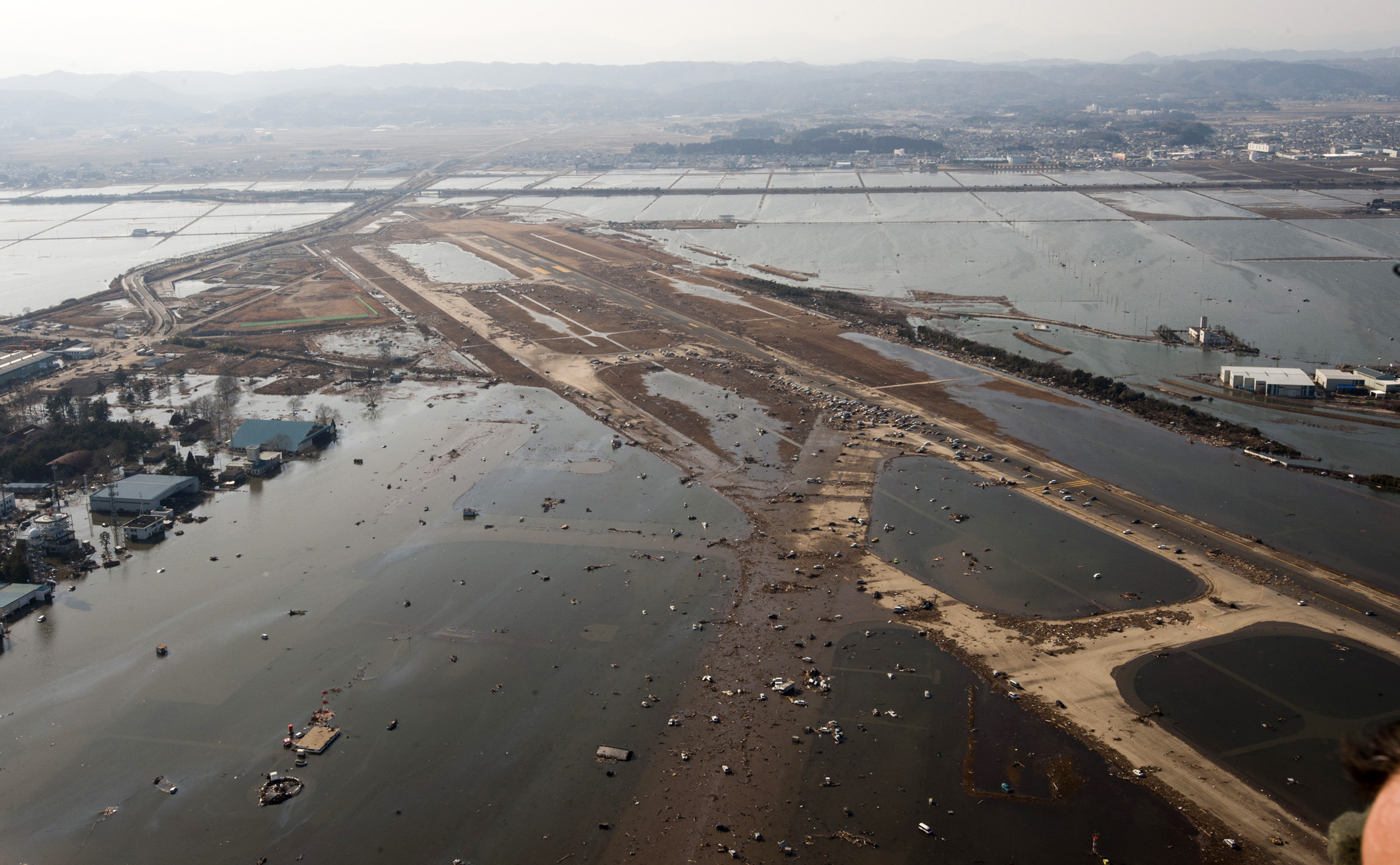
Tsunami flooding on the Sendai Airport runway

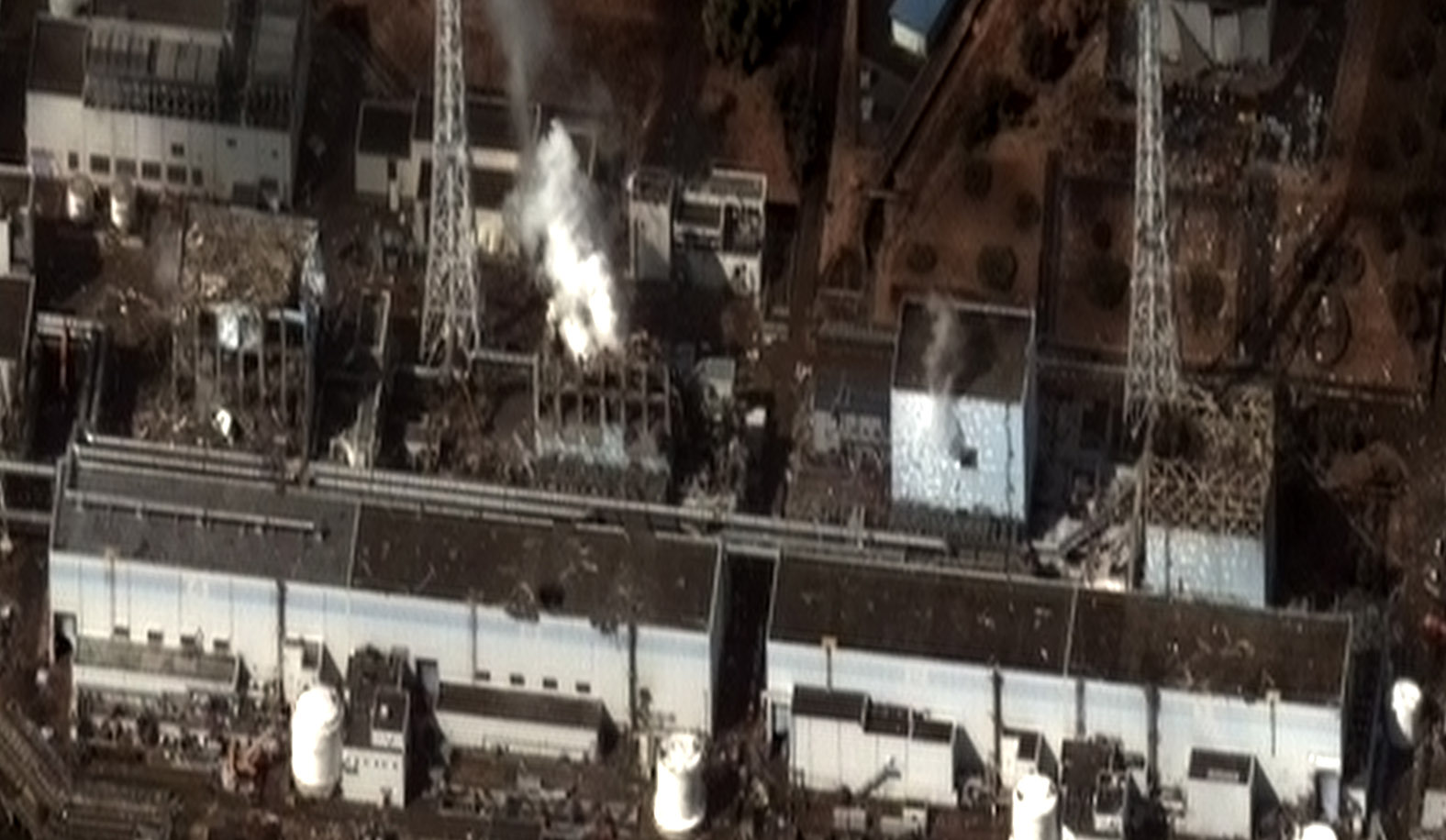
Fukushima I nuclear accidents: Satellite image taken on 16 March of the four damaged reactor buildings

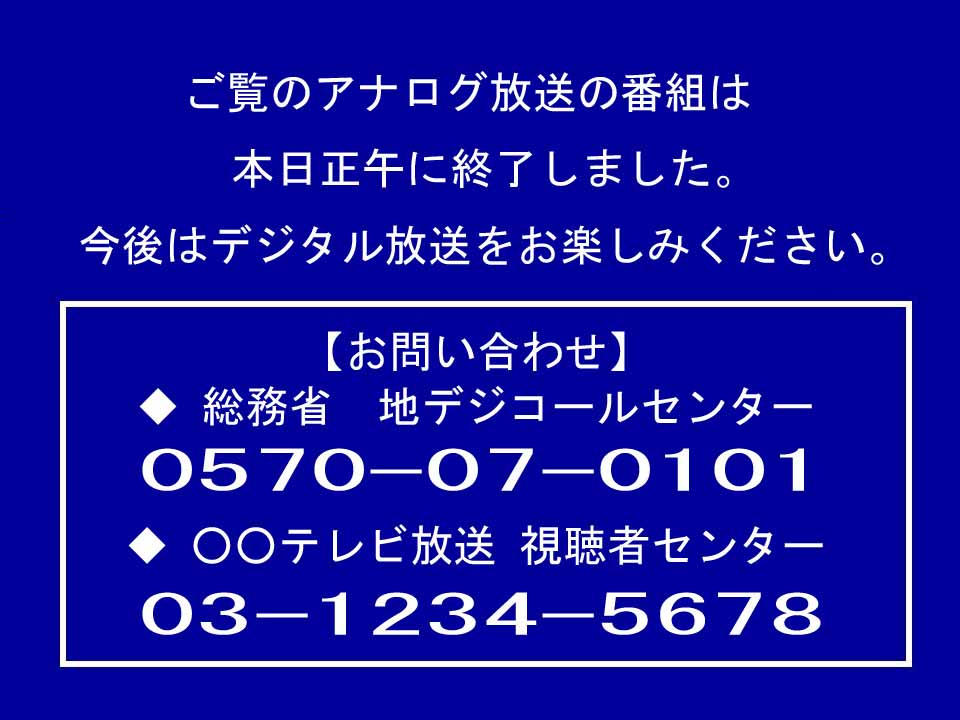
July 24: Analog shutdown captions were displayed on all but 15 Japanese television stations' analog signals from noon to midnight

== Other events ==
- Prefectural and selected municipal elections in major cities:
  - January 30 – 2011 Yamanashi gubernatorial election
  - February 6 – Triple election in Nagoya, Aichi: 2011 Aichi gubernatorial election, 2011 Nagoya mayoral election and Nagoya city council recall referendum.
  - March 13 – 2011 Nagoya city council election
  - April 10 and 24 – 2011 Japanese unified regional elections (12 governors, 41 parliaments, mayors and councils in several hundred municipalities)
  - June 5 – 2011 Aomori gubernatorial election
  - July 3 – 2011 Gunma gubernatorial election
  - July 31 – 2011 Saitama gubernatorial election
  - August 28 – 2011 Sendai city council election (originally scheduled for the unified elections but postponed following the Tōhoku earthquake)
  - September 11 -2011 Iwate gubernatorial election and 2011 Iwate prefectural election (originally scheduled for the unified elections but postponed following the Tōhoku earthquake).
  - November 13 – 2011 Miyagi prefectural election (originally scheduled for the unified elections but postponed following the Tōhoku earthquake): the LDP loses some seats, but remains strongest party with 28 of the 59 assembly seats.
  - November 20 – 2011 Fukushima prefectural election (originally scheduled for the unified elections but postponed following the Tōhoku earthquake): With many voters displaced by earthquake, tsunami and nuclear accidents, turnout reaches a historical low at 47.5 percent; the LDP gains one seat and now holds 27 of the 58 assembly seats.
  - November 27 – 2011 Kōchi gubernatorial election (uncontested): With explicit or implicit support of all established parties including the Communists, governor Masanao Ozaki is reelected without vote for a second term – the first uncontested gubernatorial election since Yoshihiro Katayama's reelection in Tottori in 2003.
  - November 27 – Double election in Osaka: Major issue of both the 2011 Osaka gubernatorial election and the 2011 Osaka city mayoral election were resigned governor and mayoral candidate Tōru Hashimoto's Osaka Metropolis plan to dissolve the cities of Osaka and Sakai and reorganize them like Tokyo's wards as special wards of Osaka prefecture. Incumbent Osaka city mayor Kunio Hiramatsu was opposed to the plan and was supported by both major parties; even the JCP nominated no candidate for Osaka mayor for the first time since 1963 to support his reelection. Despite support from all established parties and all other candidates dropping out of the race, Hiramatsu lost the mayoral election to Hashimoto by a wide margin; and Hashimoto's candidate for governor, Ichirō Matsui comfortably won the gubernatorial race against Kaoru Kurata (both major parties), one Communist and several minor independent candidates (including perennial candidate Mac Akasaka).

== Deaths ==
- January 3 – Nakamura Tomijyuro V, 81, Japanese Kabuki actor
- January 5 – Keijiro Yamashita, Japanese rockabilly singer
- January 11 – Kozo Haraguchi, 100, Japanese track and field athlete, respiratory failure
- January 14 – Toshiyuki Hosokawa, Japanese actor, acute subdural hematoma
- January 14 – Ben Wada, 80, Japanese television director, esophageal cancer
- January 17 – Shinichiro Sakurai, 81, Japanese automotive engineer, heart failure.
- February 5 – Hiroko Nagata, 65, Japanese radical and murderer, vice-chairman of United Red Army.
- February 13 – Nobutoshi Kihara, Japanese electronics engineer for Sony.
- April 17 – Osamu Dezaki, 67, director of anime, lung cancer.
- April 21 – Yoshiko Tanaka, 55, actress, breast cancer.
- April 23 – Norio Ohga, 81, businessman and CEO of Sony
- May 2 – Shigeo Yaegashi, 78, footballer
- May 12 – Miyu Uehara, 24, gravure idol and television personality, suicide
- May 16 – Kiyoshi Kodama, 77, actor
- May 18 – Seiseki Abe, 96, shodo and aikido teacher
- May 21 – Hiroyuki Nagato, 77, actor
- June 6 – Masashi Ohuchi, 67, Olympic weightlifter
- June 9 – Tomoko Kawakami, 41, voice actress
- June 28 – Osamu Kobayashi, 76, voice actor and executive director
- July 5 – Shinji Wada, 61, manga artist
- July 9 – Hideo Tanaka, 78, director
- July 17 – Takaji Mori, 67, footballer
- July 17 – Taiji Sawada, 45, musician
- July 19 – Yoshio Harada, 71, actor
- July 26 – Sakyo Komatsu, 80, science fiction writer
- July 27 – Rei Harakami, 40, musician
- July 27 – Hideki Irabu, 42, baseball player
- August 4 – Naoki Matsuda, 34, football player
- August 5 – Takehiko Maeda, 82, television writer
- August 15 – Tōru Shōriki, 92, baseball team owner (Tokyo Giants) and former CEO of Yomiuri Newspaper
- August 21 – Muga Takewaki, 67, actor
- September 6 – Shigeri Akabane, 70, professional wrestler
- September 7 – Hiroe Yuki, 62, badminton player
- December 31 – Yasutaka Matsudaira, 81, volleyball coach

== See also ==
- 2011 in Japanese football
- 2011 in Japanese music
- 2011 in Japanese television
- List of Japanese films of 2011
