= Elections in Japan =

The Japanese political process has two types of elections.

- National elections (国政選挙, kokusei senkyo)
- Subnational/local elections (地方選挙, chihō senkyo)

While the national level features a parliamentary system of government where the head of government is elected indirectly by the legislature, prefectures and municipalities employ a presidential system where chief executives and legislative assemblies are directly elected, independently from each other. Many of the prefectural and municipal elections are held together in unified local elections (統一地方選挙, Tōitsu chihō senkyo) since 1947, held in years before leap years; but since each election cycle of every chief executive or assembly of any prefecture or municipality is independent and not reset after resignations/deaths/recalls/no-confidence votes/dissolutions/municipal mergers, there are also many non-unified local elections today. Prefectural and municipal assemblies are unicameral, the National Diet is bicameral, with the two houses on independent election cycles.

== Rules and regulations, supervision ==
Both national & local elections are regulated by the Public Offices Election Law (公職選挙法, kōshoku-senkyo-hō) of 1950.

Elections are supervised by Election Administration Commissions at each administrative level under the general direction of the Central Election Management Council, an extraordinary organ attached to the Ministry of Internal Affairs and Communications (MIC). The minimum voting age in Japan's non-compulsory electoral system was reduced from 20 to 18 years in June 2016. Voters must satisfy a three-month residency requirement before being allowed to cast a ballot.

For those seeking offices, there are two sets of age requirements: twenty-five years of age for admission to the House of Representatives and most local offices, and thirty years of age for admission to the House of Councillors and the prefectural governorship. Each deposit for candidacy for national election is 3 million yen (about 27 thousand dollars) for a single-seat constituency and 6 million yen (about 54 thousand dollars) for proportional representation.

== National elections ==
National elections include:

- General elections of members of the House of Representatives (衆議院議員総選挙, Shūgi-in giin sō-senkyo), held every four years unless the lower house is dissolved earlier to elect all members of the House of Representatives at once.
- Regular/Ordinary elections of members of the House of Councillors (参議院議員通常選挙, Sangi-in giin tsūjō-senkyo), held every three years in staggered elections to six-year terms with half of the membership up in each class.
- By-elections of members of the House of Representatives/House of Councillors (衆議院/参議院議員補欠選挙, Shūgiin/Sangiin giin hoketsu-senkyo) to fill vacant majoritarian seats
- Repeat elections of members of the House of Representatives/House of Councillors (衆議院/参議院議員再選挙, Shūgiin/Sangiin giin sai-senkyo) after an election has been invalidated, e.g. by a winner missing the legal vote quorum or after election law violations

Japan's post-WWII national legislature, the National Diet (国会, Kokkai), has two directly elected chambers, elected on independent electoral cycles:

=== House of Representatives ===
The House of Representatives (衆議院, Shūgi-in) has 465 members, elected for a rarely completed four-year term, 289 members in single-seat constituencies and 176 members by proportional representation in 11 regional "block" constituencies.

General elections of members of the House of Representatives are usually held before the end of a four-year term as the chamber may be dissolved by the emperor on the advice of the Cabinet. Most prime ministers use that option. The only exception in post-war history was the "Lockheed Election" of 1976 in which the Liberal Democratic Party lost its seat majority for the first time.

The single-seat constituencies are decided by plurality, and the proportional seats are handed out in each "block" constituency to party lists proportionally (by the D'Hondt method) to their share of the vote. Each voter votes twice, once for a candidate in the local constituency, and once for a party in the regional "block" constituency. In a parallel system, there is no link between votes in one tier and seat numbers in the other; but so-called dual candidacies (重複立候補, chōfuku rikkōho) of one candidate in both tiers simultaneously are allowed. If such dual candidates lose in the majoritarian tier, they still have a chance to be elected in the proportional block. Parties may also place dual district and block candidates on the same list rank; in that case, the Sekihairitsu (惜敗率, ratio of margin of defeat) system determines the order of candidates.

=== House of Councillors ===
The House of Councillors (参議院, Sangi-in) has 245 members (248 from 2022), elected for a fixed six-year term, 147 (2022–: 148) members by single non-transferable vote (SNTV) in 45 single- and multi-seat constituencies (most are prefectures, two combined constituencies comprise two neighbouring prefectures each) and 98 (2022–: 100) by proportional representation (by D'Hondt method) with optionally open lists in a single, nationwide constituency.

Regular/Ordinary elections of members of the House of Councillors are held once every three years. In staggered elections, half of the House of Councillors comes up for election every three years in elections. The term is fixed, the House of Councillors cannot be dissolved. This, too, is a parallel electoral system. Dual candidacies are not allowed. As in House of Representatives elections, voters have two votes: In the majoritarian election, the vote has to be for a candidate, but in the proportional election, the vote may be for either a party list or a single candidate; in the latter case, the vote counts as both a vote for the party list (to determine proportional seat distribution), and as a preference vote within that list (to determine the order or proportional candidates within that list). The district magnitudes in the majoritarian tier vary between one and six, dependent on, but not fully proportional to the population of each prefecture. In single-member constituencies, SNTV becomes equivalent to first-past-the-post, whereas seats are usually split between different parties/alliances in multi-member constituencies (and in the proportional constituency by definition). Therefore, the single-member constituencies of the House of Councillors (参議院一人区, Sangiin ichinin-ku) are more likely to swing the election result and often receive more media and campaign attention. The proportional election to the House of Councillors allows the voters to cast a preference vote for a single candidate on a party list. The preference votes strictly determined the ranking of candidates on party lists before 2019. Since the 2019 election, parties are allowed to prioritize individual candidates on their proportional list over voter preferences in a "special frame" (特定枠, tokutei-waku). In the 2019 election, almost all parties continued to use completely open lists; exceptions were the LDP which used the "special frame" to give secure list spots to two LDP prefectural federations affected by the introduction of combined constituencies in 2016, Reiwa Shinsengumi which used it to give secure list spots to two candidates with severe disabilities, and the minor "Labourers' Party for the liberation of labour".

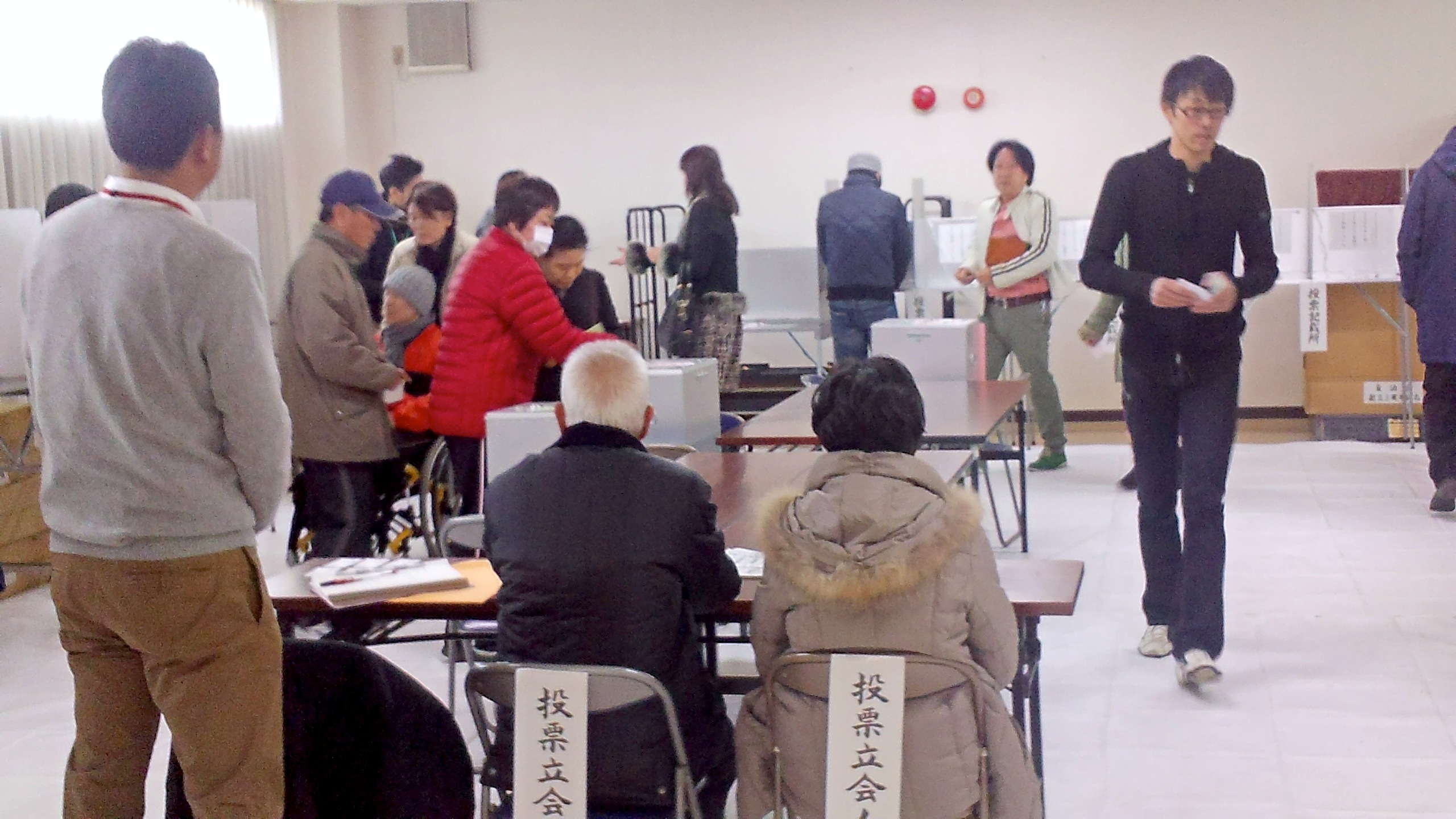
Voting in Higashiōsaka, Osaka Prefecture, Japan, 2014

=== Double elections ===
The electoral cycles of the two chambers of the Diet are usually not synchronized. When the 1947 constitution came into effect, the first House of Councillors election was held several days apart from the 23rd House of Representatives election. Only in 1980 and 1986, general and regular election coincided on the same day because the House of Representatives was dissolved in time for the election to be scheduled together with the House of Councillors election in early summer.

=== By- and repeat elections ===
Vacant district seats in both Houses are generally filled in by-elections. Nowadays, these are usually scheduled in April and October as necessary. Vacant proportional seats in both Houses and district seats in the House of Councillors that fall vacant within three months of a regular election are filled by kuriage-tōsen (繰り上げ当選, roughly "being elected as runner-up"): the highest ranking candidate on a proportional list or in the electoral district who was not elected and is not disqualified takes the seat. Disqualifications may, for example, happen if a candidate for the House of Councillors runs for the House of Representatives or vice versa, or after a violation of campaign laws.

=== Election of the Prime Minister ===
Between 1885 and 1947 in the Empire of Japan, the prime minister was not elected by the legislature, but responsible to, chosen and appointed by the Emperor. In practice, the Genrō (元老) usually nominated a candidate for appointment. The Imperial Diet (帝国議会, Teikoku-gikai) and its elected lower house, the House of Representatives, which were set up in 1890 according to the Imperial Constitution, had no constitutionally guaranteed role in the formation of cabinets.

Since 1947, the Prime Minister has been chosen in the "designation election of the prime minister" (内閣総理大臣指名選挙, Naikaku sōridaijin shimei senkyo) (ja) in the National Diet. It is held after a cabinet has submitted its resignation – the outgoing cabinet remains as caretaker cabinet until the Imperial inauguration ceremony of a new prime minister –; a cabinet must resign en masse under the constitution (Articles 69 and 70) 1. always on convocation of the first Diet after a general election of the House of Representatives, 2. if the post of prime minister has fallen vacant – that includes cases when the prime minister is permanently incapacitated, e.g. by illness, kidnapping or defection –, or 3. if a no-confidence vote in the House of Representatives is not answered by the dissolution of the chamber. Though both Houses of the Diet vote in two-round elections to select a prime minister, the House of Representatives has the decisive vote: If the two Houses vote for different candidates (as they did in 1948, 1989, 1998, 2007 and 2008), a procedure in the joint committee of both houses (両院協議会, Ryōin Kyōgikai) may reach a consensus; but eventually the candidate of the House of Representatives becomes that of the whole Diet and thereby prime minister-designate. The designated prime minister must still be ceremonially appointed by the Emperor in the Imperial Investiture (親任式, Shinnin-shiki) to enter office; but unlike some heads of state, the Emperor has no reserve power to appoint anyone other than the person elected by the Diet.

In 2001, LDP president and Prime Minister Junichirō Koizumi instituted an advisory council to investigate the possibility of introducing direct popular election of the prime minister in a constitutional revision.

== Latest results ==
=== 2025 House of Councillors election ===
Held in July 2025, the ruling coalition of the Liberal Democratic Party (LDP) and Komeito lost its majority in the House of Councillors. The LDP’s national vote share fell to 21.6%, the lowest result in the party’s history. The coalition’s decline was driven by growing support for smaller opposition parties. LDP party president and prime minister Shigeru Ishiba would eventually announce his intention to resign in September 2025.

== Apportionment ==
In the 1980s, apportionment of electoral districts still reflected the distribution of the population in the years following World War II, when only one-third of the people lived in urban areas and two thirds lived in rural areas. In the next forty-five years, the population became more than three-quarters urban, as people deserted rural communities to seek economic opportunities in Tokyo and other large cities. The lack of reapportionment led to a serious underrepresentation of urban voters. Urban districts in the House of Representatives were increased by five in 1964, bringing nineteen new representatives to the lower house; in 1975 six more urban districts were established, with a total of twenty new representatives allocated to them and to other urban districts. Yet great inequities remained between urban and rural voters.

In the early 1980s, as many as five times the votes were needed to elect a representative from an urban district compared with those needed for a rural district. Similar disparities existed in the prefectural constituencies of the House of Councillors. The Supreme Court had ruled on several occasions that the imbalance violated the constitutional principle of one person-one vote. The Supreme Court mandated the addition of eight representatives to urban districts and the removal of seven from rural districts in 1986. Several lower house districts' boundaries were redrawn. Yet the disparity was still as much as three urban votes to one rural vote.

After the 1986 change, the average number of persons per lower house representative was 236,424. However, the figure varied from 427,761 persons per representative in the fourth district of Kanagawa Prefecture, which contains the large city of Yokohama, to 142,932 persons in the third district of largely rural and mountainous Nagano Prefecture.

The 1993 reform government under Hosokawa Morihiro introduce a new electoral system whereby 200 members (reduced to 180 beginning with the 2000 election) are elected by proportional representation in multi-member districts or "blocs" while 300 are elected from single-candidate districts.

The 2009 general House of Representatives election was the first unconstitutional lower house election since the introducion of the new electoral system in 1994 (parallel voting and "small" FPTP single-member electoral districts/"Kakumander"). In March 2011, the Grand Bench (daihōtei) of the Supreme Court ruled that the maximum discrepancy of 2.30 in voting weight between the Kōchi 3 and Chiba 4 constituencies in the 2009 election was in violation of the constitutionally guaranteed equality of all voters. As in previous such rulings on unconstitutional elections (1972, 1980, 1983 and 1990 Representatives elections, 1992 Councillors election), the election is not invalidated, but the imbalance has to be corrected by the Diet through redistricting and/or reapportionment of seats between prefectures.

In 2016, a panel of experts proposed to introduce the [John Quincy] Adams apportionment method (method of smallest divisors) for apportioning House of Representatives seats to prefectures. The reform is planned to be implemented after the 2020 census figures are available and not expected to take effect before 2022. In the meantime, another redistricting and apportionment passed in 2017 is designed to keep the maximum malapportionment ratio in the House of Representatives below 2. In the FPTP tier, it changes 97 districts and cuts six without adding any; in the proportional tier, four "blocks" lose a seat each; the total number of seats in the lower house is cut to 465, 289 majoritarian seats and 176 proportional seats.

The malapportionment in the 2010 and 2013 regular House of Councillors elections was ruled unconstitutional (or "in an unconstitutional state") by the Supreme Court, and has been reduced by a 2015 reapportionment below 3 (at least in government statistics from census data which is regular and standardized but lags behind resident registration statistics and the actual number of eligible voters; using the latter, the maximum malapportionment in the 2016 election remained slightly above 3).

Electoral districts with the highest and lowest voting weight for the National Diet as of 2016
House of Representatives					House of Councillors				
	Lowest vote weight		Highest vote weight		Lowest vote weight		Highest vote weight		
#	District	Registered voters	District	Registered voters	District	Registered voters per member elected	District	Registered voters per member elected	#
1	Tokyo 1	514,974	Fukushima 4	233,491	Saitama	1,015,543	Fukui	328,772	1
2	Hokkaidō 1	505,510	Miyagi 5	234,373	Niigata	978,686	Saga	346,727	2
3	Tokyo 3	504,929	Kagoshima 5	240,056	Miyagi	975,466	Yamanashi	353,402	3
4	Tokyo 5	498,903	Tottori 1	240,874	Kanagawa	951,735	Kagawa	417,082	4
5	Hyōgo 6	492,173	Nagasaki 3	242,165	Tokyo	937,470	Wakayama	419,011	5
6	Tokyo 6	490,674	Tottori 2	242,194	Osaka	915,000	Akita	448,236	6
7	Tokyo 19	488,494	Nagasaki 4	242,303	Nagano	885,638	Toyama	452,822	7
8	Tokyo 22	486,965	Aomori 3	244,007	Chiba	871,110	Miyazaki	466,829	8
9	Saitama 3	483,014	Mie 4	244,825	Gifu	850,190	Yamagata	475,419	9
10	Tokyo 23	481,206	Iwate 3	246,272	Tochigi	827,368	Ishikawa	481,027	10

== Prefectural and local elections ==
Local elections include:

- Prefectural elections
  - Prefectural gubernatorial elections (都道府県知事選挙, to/dō/fu/ken-chiji-senkyo) on an independent four-year cycle
  - General/by-/repeat elections of members of a prefectural assembly (都道府県議会議員一般/補欠/再選挙, to/dō/fu/ken-gikai giin ippan-/hoketsu-/sai-senkyo), general elections are held on an independent four-year cycle
- Municipal elections
  - Municipal mayoral elections (市区町村長選挙, shi/ku/chō/son-chō-senkyo) on an independent four-year cycle
  - General/by-/repeat elections of members of a municipal assembly (市区町村議会議員一般/補欠/再選挙, shi/ku/chō/son-gikai giin ippan-/hoketsu-/sai-senkyo), general elections are held on an independent four-year cycle

There are 47 prefectures (-to/-dō/-fu/-ken) of Japan since 1888, they are contiguously subdivided into 1741 municipalities (-shi/-ku/-chō/-son) since 2014 (see Administrative divisions of Japan).

=== Unified elections ===
Unified local elections (統一地方選挙, Tōitsu chihō senkyo) are held once every four years. Prefectural assemblies and governors, as well as mayors and assemblies in municipalities, are elected for four-year terms. In April 1947, all local elections in the 46 prefectures (excluding Okinawa Prefecture, then under US military rule) and all their municipalities were held at the same time in "unified local elections". Since then, some gubernatorial and mayoral elections, and most assembly elections, have stayed on this original four-year cycle. Most governors and mayors are now elected on different schedules as the four-year cycle "resets" upon the resignation, death or removal of a sitting governor or mayor. Some assembly election cycles have also shifted due to assembly dissolutions or mergers of municipalities.

The most recent were the 2023 Japanese unified local elections.

As of 2015, the major contests in the unified local elections are as follows:

Prefecture	Governor	Assembly	Designated city races
Hokkaido	♦	♦	Sapporo mayor Sapporo assembly
Aomori		♦	
Akita		♦	
Yamagata		♦	
Tochigi		♦	
Gunma		♦	
Saitama		♦	Saitama assembly
Chiba		♦	Chiba assembly
Kanagawa	♦	♦	Yokohama assembly Kawasaki assembly Sagamihara mayor Sagamihara assembly
Niigata		♦	Niigata assembly
Toyama		♦	
Ishikawa		♦	
Fukui	♦	♦	
Yamanashi		♦	
Nagano		♦	
Gifu		♦	
Shizuoka		♦	Shizuoka mayor Hamamatsu mayor Hamamatsu assembly
Aichi		♦	Nagoya assembly
Mie	♦	♦	
Shiga		♦	
Kyoto		♦	Kyoto assembly
Osaka		♦	Osaka assembly Sakai assembly
Hyōgo		♦	Kobe assembly
Nara	♦	♦	
Wakayama		♦	
Tottori	♦	♦	
Shimane	♦	♦	
Okayama		♦	Okayama assembly
Hiroshima		♦	Hiroshima mayor Hiroshima assembly
Yamaguchi		♦	
Tokushima	♦	♦	
Kagawa		♦	
Ehime		♦	
Kōchi		♦	
Fukuoka	♦	♦	Fukuoka assembly
Saga		♦	
Nagasaki		♦	
Kumamoto		♦	Kumamoto assembly
Oita	♦	♦	
Miyazaki		♦	
Kagoshima		♦	

Although Tokyo's metropolitan governor and assembly elections are currently held on separate schedules, 21 of the 23 special wards of Tokyo follow the unified election schedule for their assembly elections, the only exceptions being Katsushika and Adachi. The majority of Tokyo's special wards follow separate cycles for their mayoral elections. Tokyo elected its governor as part of the unified elections until 2011, but was forced to hold a 2012 election and 2014 election due to the resignations of Shintaro Ishihara and Naoki Inose.

Iwate Prefecture, Miyagi Prefecture and Fukushima Prefecture are no longer on the unified election cycle due to the 2011 Tohoku earthquake and tsunami, which delayed their elections.

List of unified local elections

- 2007 Japanese unified local elections
- 2011 Japanese unified local elections
- 2015 Japanese unified local elections
- 2019 Japanese unified local elections
- 2023 Japanese unified local elections

=== Other major local election cycles ===
- Since 1971, Ibaraki Prefecture has held its prefectural assembly elections in the December preceding the unified election, making this election a regular leading indicator of the nationwide elections in the following April. The 2014 Ibaraki election was held on the same day as the 2014 Japanese general election.
- Approximately 193 new municipalities were created in a wave of "Heisei mergers" effective in April 2005. Their first municipal elections were held around this time, and coincided with the Chiba and Akita gubernatorial elections and the Nagoya mayoral election, creating a second major local election cycle sometimes referred to as the "mini unified local elections".
- Okinawa Prefecture and most of its local governments continue to follow a four-year cycle that began following repatriation to Japan in June 1972, with several exceptions (including the city of Naha). Okinawa elections generally occur in the year following the unified elections; the next is scheduled for June 2016.

== Ballots, voting machines and early voting ==
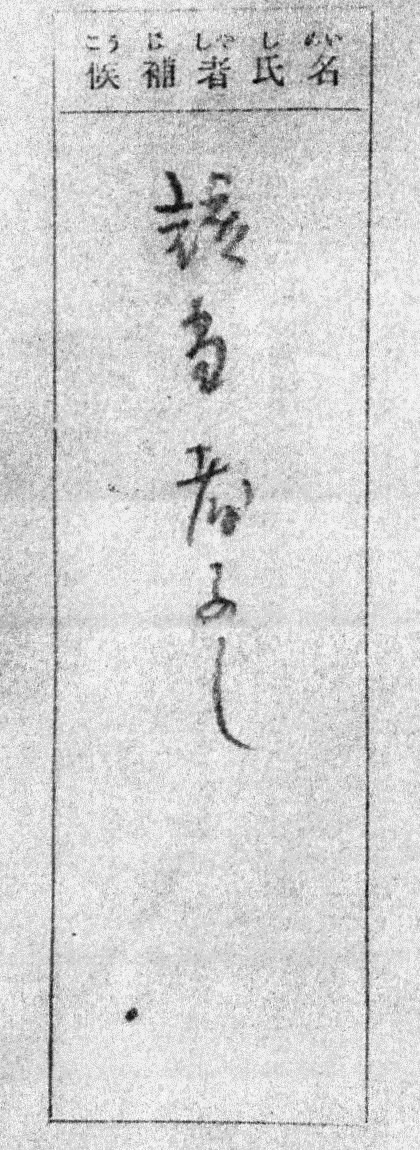
A used Japanese ballot paper from the 1952 House of Representatives election, in this case spoilt by writing "There is no suitable person" (該当者なし, Gaitō-sha Nashi). The only thing that is literally "on the ballot" in Japan before a voter votes is an empty box titled "candidate name" (候補者氏名, Kōho-sha Shimei) and usually a text next to it with general notes such as "Please don't write anything other than the name of an actual candidate." or "Please don't write outside the box."

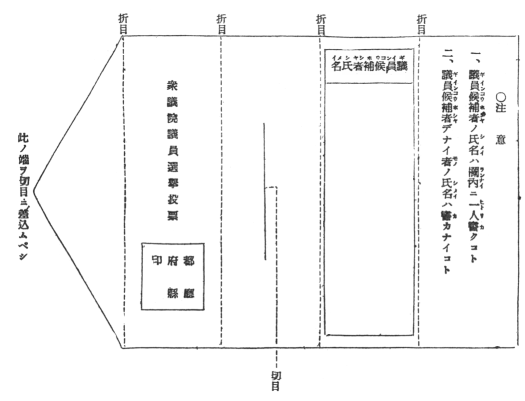
A sample ballot paper for a House of Representatives election according to a 1945 Home Ministry ordinance

Votes in national and most local elections are cast by writing the candidate's or party's name on a blank ballot paper. In elections for the House of Representatives voters fill in two ballots, one with the name of their preferred district candidate and one with their preferred party in the proportional representation block. For the House of Councillors, the district vote is similar (in SNTV multi-member districts, several candidates can be elected, but every voter has only one vote). But in the proportional vote for the House of Councillors votes are cast for a party list (to determine how many proportional seats a party receives) or a candidate (which additionally influences which candidates are elected from a party's list).

Ballots that cannot unambiguously be assigned to a candidate are not considered invalid, but are assigned to all potentially intended candidates proportionally to the unambiguous votes each candidate has received. These so-called "proportional fractional votes" (按分票, Anbun-hyō) are rounded to the third decimal. For example, if "Yamada A" and "Yamada B" both stood in an election and there were 1500 unambiguous votes: 1000 for "Yamada A" and 500 for "Yamada B"; five ambiguous votes for "Yamada" would then count for Yamada A as 5×1000/1500=3.333 votes, and for Yamada B as 5×500/1500=1.667 votes. The official overall result would then be: Yamada A 1003.333 votes, Yamada B 501.667 votes.

In 2002, passage of an electronic voting law allowed for the introduction of electronic voting machines in local elections. The first machine vote took place in Niimi, Okayama in June 2002. In 2003, a system for early voting (期日前投票制度, Kijitsu-mae tōhyō seido) was introduced. In the 2017 general/House of Representatives election, a record number of more than 21 million Japanese voted early; at the same time overall turnout was low (the second lowest in history), so in 2017, roughly 38% of all actual voters had voted early. For regular/House of Councillors elections, the 2019 election set a new all-time high with more than 17 million early voters, corresponding to roughly a third of actual voters in 2019 as overall turnout hit the second lowest value in history.

== Walkovers ==
In Japan, walkovers in elections are called Mutōhyō tōsen (無投票当選), "[being] elected without vote". And there is literally no vote held in a walkover in Japan, no way to vote "no" or abstain explicitly: If there are only as many candidates in an election as there are seats/offices at the start of the legal election period ("official announcement": kōji (公示) in national general and regular elections; kokuji (告示) in prefectural and municipal elections as well as national by-elections), they are declared the winners. But the otherwise applicable moratorium period after regular elections on recall attempts does not apply after a walkover. (Recalls are a two-/three-step procedure: first, supporters of a recall must collect a sufficient number of signatures; if they do, a referendum is held on whether or not to recall the incumbent; only if that is accepted by a majority, a fresh election is scheduled.) Article 100 of the Public Offices Election Law deals with walkovers, there are additional walkover provisions for subnational elections in the Local Autonomy Law.

Walkovers have become widespread in prefectural and municipal elections in recent years; in the 2019 unified local elections, out of 2277 seats up in 945 electoral districts for 41 prefectural assemblies, a record 612 seats are won by walkovers in a total of 371 districts or 39% of all electoral districts. In one extreme case, a rural single-member electoral district to the Shimane prefectural assembly, there hasn't been a contested election in 31 years (the whole Heisei period).

== See also ==
- Electoral calendar
- Election
- Political funding in Japan
- Mixed-member majoritarian representation
- National Diet
  - House of Representatives (Japan)
  - House of Councillors (Japan)
