= 2011 Japanese unified local elections =

The 17th unified local elections (第17回統一地方選挙, dai-jūnana-kai tōitsu chihō senkyo) in Japan took place in April 2011. In the first phase on April 10, 2011, 12 governors, 41 prefectural assemblies as well as five mayors and 15 assemblies in cities designated by government ordinance were elected. In the second phase on April 24, 2011, mayors and assemblies in hundreds of cities, "special wards" of Tokyo, towns, and villages were up for election. Additionally, a by-election for the National Diet was held in Aichi on April 24.

Among the elections that attracted national attention in 2011 were the gubernatorial races in Tokyo and Kanagawa and the prefectural assembly elections in Aichi and Osaka, in which new local parties threatened the position of established parties.

== Background ==
The nationally ruling Democratic Party of Japan (DPJ), under the leadership of Naoto Kan, began in a weak position in prefectures and municipalities. In February 2011, the Kan cabinet faced extremely low approval ratings, a "twisted Diet" with opposition control of the upper house and a possible government shutdown in 2011 if it failed to get budget-related bills through the Diet for fiscal year 2011. It also faced calls for an early general election from the opposition led by the Liberal Democratic Party of Japan (LDP). In the run-up to the unified local elections, the Democrats lost or even failed to contest several high-profile elections including the Fukuoka mayoral election on November 14, 2010; the Okinawa gubernatorial election on November 28, 2010; and the so-called "triple vote" in Aichi on February 6, 2011 (triple tōhyō: gubernatorial election in Aichi, mayoral election in Nagoya, Aichi and recall referendum for the Nagoya city assembly).

After the 2011 Tōhoku earthquake and tsunami in March, elections in the most affected prefectures of Iwate, Miyagi, Fukushima, Mito, and Ibaraki were temporarily postponed. The elections for governor and assembly of Iwate were held on September 11, 2011. The assembly election in Miyagi was held on November 13, 2011 and in Fukushima on November 20, 2011.

== Elections on April 10 ==
=== Prefectural elections ===
- Gubernatorial elections in
  - Hokkaidō: Incumbent Harumi Takahashi won reelection against DPJ-supported Toshiaki Kimura and two other contenders
  - Tokyo: Shintarō Ishihara with unofficial backing form Liberal Democratic Party and Justice Party won a fourth term against former Miyazaki governor Hideo Higashikokubaru and entrepreneur Miki Watanabe who was supported by the DPJ prefectural assembly group.
  - Kanagawa: Yūji Kuroiwa won with unofficial support from both major parties; incumbent Shigefumi Matsuzawa (formerly DPJ) had declared his candidacy for governor of Tokyo, but dropped out of the race after the Great East Japan earthquake and Ishihara's decision to run for a fourth term.
  - Fukui: Incumbent Issei Nishikawa won reelection against only one JCP-backed challenger.
  - Mie: Governor Akihiko Noro retired. The LDP and smaller parties support former METI bureaucrat Eikei Suzuki who narrowly won the election against DPJ-supported Naohisa Matsuda, formerly mayor of Tsu.
  - Nara: Incumbent governor Shōgo Arai won reelection against Shunji Shiomi, president of the prefectural doctors' association, and a JCP candidate.
  - Tottori: Shinji Hirai was reelected for a second term against a JCP-backed challenger.
  - Shimane: Incumbent Zenbee Mizoguchi was reelected against only a JCP candidate after other candidates had dropped out of the race after the earthquake.
  - Tokushima: Kamon Iizumi won reelection against JCP-supported challenger Chiyoko Yamamoto
  - Fukuoka: Incumbent Wataru Asō retired. The three largest parties LDP, DPJ and Kōmeitō supported former MITI bureaucrat Hiroshi Ogawa for governor. The only other candidate in the race, JCP candidate Takaaki Tamura, won almost 30 percent of the vote.
  - Saga: Incumbent Yasushi Furukawa won a third term against only one JCP backed candidate.
  - Ōita: Against only one JCP challenger, governor Katsusada Hirose was reelected.
- Assembly elections in all prefectures with the exceptions of Ibaraki, Tokyo and Okinawa (elections in Iwate, Miyagi and Fukushima postponed): The DPJ could not improve its weak position in prefectural assemblies. Despite some seat losses, the LDP remained strongest party in all assemblies with the exception of Osaka where governor Tōru Hashimoto's Osaka Restoration Association won an outright majority. In Aichi, Genzei Nippon, came in as third largest party but failed to win many seats outside Nagoya city. Nationwide, JCP and SDP recorded losses, Yoshimi Watanabe's Your Party gained seats in several assemblies including Watanabe's home prefecture of Tochigi where it became second largest party.

=== Municipal elections ===
- Mayoral elections in
  - Sapporo, Hokkaidō: DPJ-backed Fumio Ueda reelected for a third term
  - Sagamihara, Kanagawa: One-term mayor Toshio Kayama reelected
  - Shizuoka, Shizuoka: Zenkichi Kojima retired. Former prefectural assemblyman Nobuhiro Tanabe won with LDP support.
  - Hamamatsu, Shizuoka: Without a challenger, mayor Yasutomo Suzuki was reelected without vote.
  - Hiroshima, Hiroshima: Six candidates sought to succeed retiring mayor Tadatoshi Akiba. With LDP and Kōmeitō support Kazumi Matsui won.
- Assembly elections in all cites designated by government ordinance with the exceptions of Shizuoka, Nagoya and Kitakyūshū (election in Sendai postponed). In both of Osaka's cites designated by government ordinance, Osaka and Sakai, governor Tōru Hashimoto's Osaka Restoration Association became strongest party. The DPJ won a plurality of seats in the Sapporo assembly; in most other cities the LDP remained strongest party (though independents form the majority in several smaller cities). Yoshimi Watanabe's Your Party won seats in several assemblies.

== Elections on April 24 ==
- By-election for the National Diet: House of Representatives, Aichi 6th district

=== Municipal elections ===
- Mayoral elections in 88 cities, 13 cities (special wards) of Tokyo and 132 towns and villages (includes postponed elections)
- Assembly elections in 305 cities, 21 cities (special wards) of Tokyo and 404 towns and villages (includes postponed elections)

Elections with national media coverage included the mayoral races in the prefectural capitals Tsu, Nagasaki, Ōita and Takamatsu, in several cities of Tokyo, in the bankrupt city of Yubari, Hokkaidō and in Suita, Ōsaka where Tetsuya Inoue recorded another victory for the Osaka Restoration Association.

== See also ==
- 2015 Japanese unified local elections
