= 2019 Japanese unified local elections =

The first stage of the 19th unified local elections (第19回統一地方選挙, dai-jūkyū-kai tōitsu chihō senkyo) in Japan took place on April 7, 2019, with the second following on 21 April 2019.

== Results ==
=== Governors ===
Prefecture	Turnout (%)	Party	Candidate	Votes	%
Fukui Prefecture	58.35	Independent	Tatsuji Sugimoto	220,774	59.3
Fukui Prefecture	58.35	Independent	Issei Nishikawa	131,098	35.2
Fukui Prefecture	58.35	Communist Party	Yukie Kanemoto	20,462	5.5
Fukuoka Prefecture	42.72	Independent	Hiroshi Ogawa	1,293,648	73.6
Fukuoka Prefecture	42.72	Independent	Kazuhisa Takeuchi	345,085	19.6
Fukuoka Prefecture	42.72	Independent	Kiyoshi Shinoda	119,871	6.8
Hokkaido	58.34	Independent	Naomichi Suzuki	1,621,171	62.7
Hokkaido	58.34	Independent	Tomohiro Ishikawa	963,942	37.3
Kanagawa Prefecture	40.28	Independent	Yuji Kuroiwa	2,251,289	76.3
Kanagawa Prefecture	40.28	Independent	Makiko Kishi	700,091	23.7
Mie Prefecture	46.68	Independent	Eikei Suzuki	615,281	89.7
Mie Prefecture	46.68	Independent	Kanako Suzuki	70,657	10.3
Nara Prefecture	48.49	Independent	Shōgo Arai	256,451	47.5
Nara Prefecture	48.49	Independent	Kiyoshige Maekawa	174,277	32.3
Nara Prefecture	48.49	Independent	Minoru Kawashima	108,701	20.2
Ōita Prefecture	47.41	Independent	Katsusada Hirose	360,246	80.7
Ōita Prefecture	47.41	Communist Party	Kai Yamashita	66,502	14.9
Ōita Prefecture	47.41	Independent	Yoshiko Shutō	19,701	4.4
Osaka Prefecture	49.49	Osaka Restoration Association	Hirofumi Yoshimura	2,266,103	64.4
Osaka Prefecture	49.49	Independent	Tadakazu Konishi	1,254,200	35.6
Shimane Prefecture	62.04	Independent	Tatsuya Maruyama	150,338	43.6
Shimane Prefecture	62.04	Independent	Seiji Ōba	120,276	34.9
Shimane Prefecture	62.04	Independent	Jirō Shimada	40,694	11.8
Shimane Prefecture	62.04	Independent	Yasuko Yamasaki	33,699	9.8
Tokushima Prefecture	48.34	Independent	Kamon Iizumi	158,972	53.0
Tokushima Prefecture	48.34	Independent	Taiji Kishimoto	122,779	40.9
Tokushima Prefecture	48.34	Communist Party	Atsushi Amou	18,332	6.1
Tottori Prefecture	53.09	Independent	Shinji Hirai	225,883	92.3
Tottori Prefecture	53.09	Independent	Hideyuki Fukuzumi	14,056	5.7
Tottori Prefecture	53.09	Independent	Hiroshi Inoue	4,905	2.0
Source: NHK

=== Prefectural assemblies ===
Prefecture	Total seats	Seats won										
Prefecture	Total seats	LDP	Komeito	CDP	JCP	DPFP	SDP	NIK	LP	Kibō	Others	Ind.
Hokkaido	100	51	8	24	3	0	–	0	–	–	0	14
Aichi Prefecture	102	57	6	7	0	8	–	0	–	–	1	23
Akita Prefecture	43	24	1	1	1	–	2	–	–	–	–	14
Aomori Prefecture	48	28	2	1	3	3	0	–	–	–	–	11
Chiba Prefecture	94	45	8	10	2	6	1	0	–	–	1	21
Ehime Prefecture	47	15	2	2	1	0	–	–	–	–	1	26
Fukui Prefecture	37	25	1	1	1	–	–	–	–	–	–	9
Fukuoka Prefecture	87	40	10	5	2	12	–	–	–	–	1	17
Gifu Prefecture	46	29	2	1	1	3	–	–	–	–	–	10
Gunma Prefecture	50	25	3	2	2	–	–	–	–	–	–	18
Hiroshima Prefecture	64	32	6	–	1	1	–	–	–	–	–	24
Hyōgo Prefecture	86	27	12	5	5	1	–	9	–	–	0	27
Ishikawa Prefecture	43	28	2	–	1	2	1	–	–	–	–	9
Kagawa Prefecture	41	27	2	1	2	2	3	–	–	–	–	4
Kagoshima Prefecture	51	34	3	1	1	0	1	0	–	–	–	11
Kanagawa Prefecture	105	47	8	23	5	5	–	–	0	0	1	16
Kōchi Prefecture	37	19	3	1	5	0	–	–	–	–	–	9
Kumamoto Prefecture	49	31	3	1	1	–	–	–	–	–	0	13
Kyoto Prefecture	60	28	5	2	12	5	–	2	–	–	0	6
Mie Prefecture	51	21	2	–	1	–	–	0	–	–	10	17
Miyazaki Prefecture	39	24	3	1	2	1	4	–	–	–	–	4
Nagano Prefecture	57	21	4	1	5	0	–	0	–	–	–	26
Nagasaki Prefecture	46	28	3	1	1	5	2	–	–	–	–	6
Nara Prefecture	43	21	3	0	4	4	–	4	–	–	1	6
Niigata Prefecture	53	28	2	1	1	2	2	–	–	–	1	16
Ōita Prefecture	43	16	3	1	2	1	1	0	–	–	–	19
Okayama Prefecture	55	32	5	2	2	1	–	–	–	–	0	13
Osaka Prefecture	88	15	15	1	2	0	–	–	–	–	51	4
Saga Prefecture	38	25	2	–	2	3	1	–	–	–	–	5
Saitama Prefecture	93	48	9	7	6	4	–	–	–	0	1	18
Shiga Prefecture	44	16	2	3	4	–	–	–	–	–	9	10
Shimane Prefecture	37	19	2	1	2	1	–	–	–	–	–	12
Shizuoka Prefecture	68	35	5	1	1	3	–	–	–	–	–	23
Tochigi Prefecture	50	31	3	3	1	1	–	–	–	–	–	11
Tokushima Prefecture	38	22	2	–	2	2	–	–	–	–	–	10
Tottori Prefecture	35	14	3	3	1	3	–	–	–	–	–	11
Toyama Prefecture	40	32	1	–	2	–	3	0	–	–	–	2
Wakayama Prefecture	42	25	3	1	4	1	–	1	–	–	–	7
Yamagata Prefecture	43	27	1	2	2	1	1	–	–	–	–	9
Yamaguchi Prefecture	47	29	5	–	2	1	–	–	–	–	1	9
Yamanashi Prefecture	37	17	1	1	1	1	–	–	–	–	–	16
Total	2,277	1,158	166	118	99	83	22	16	0	0	79	536
Source: NHK

=== Mayors of designated cities ===
Designated city	Turnout (%)	Party	Candidate	Votes	%
Hamamatsu	55.75	Independent	Yasutomo Suzuki	195,728	55.1
Hamamatsu	55.75	Independent	Ryotaro Yamamoto	134,611	37.9
Hamamatsu	55.75	Independent	Masashi Nozawa	25,195	7.1
Hiroshima	36.62	Independent	Kazumi Matsui	295,038	85.4
Hiroshima	36.62	Independent	Kazuyuki Sengo	27,876	8.1
Hiroshima	36.62	Independent	Kazuhiro Kaneko	22,365	6.5
Osaka	52.70	Osaka Restoration Association	Ichirō Matsui	660,819	58.1
Osaka	52.70	Independent	Akira Yanagimoto	476,351	41.9
Sagamihara	48.91	Independent	Kentarou Motomura	132,186	46.7
Sagamihara	48.91	Independent	Toshio Kayama	74,456	26.3
Sagamihara	48.91	Independent	Yuichiro Miyazaki	40,467	14.3
Sagamihara	48.91	Independent	Daijiro Yagi	35,753	12.6
Sapporo	56.25	Independent	Katsuhiro Akimoto	634,365	70.6
Sapporo	56.25	Independent	Tatsuo Watanabe	264,008	29.4
Shizuoka	48.76	Independent	Nobuhiro Tanabe	138,454	49.6
Shizuoka	48.76	Independent	Shingo Amano	107,407	38.5
Shizuoka	48.76	Independent	Katsushi Hayashi	33,322	11.9
Source: NHK

=== Designated city assemblies ===
Designated city	Total seats	Seats won									
Designated city	Total seats	LDP	Komeito	JCP	CDP	DPFP	NIK	SDP	Kibō	Others	Ind.
Chiba	50	18	8	6	5	5	–	–	–	2	6
Fukuoka	62	21	12	6	5	3	2	–	–	5	8
Hamamatsu	46	9	5	4	0	0	–	–	–	–	28
Hiroshima	54	26	8	5	–	–	0	1	0	0	14
Kawasaki	60	19	11	11	8	2	0	–	0	1	8
Kobe	69	20	12	9	7	2	10	–	–	3	6
Kumamoto	48	14	8	2	1	0	–	–	–	0	23
Kyoto	67	21	10	18	3	4	4	–	–	5	2
Nagoya	68	21	11	5	11	6	–	–	–	14	0
Niigata	51	18	4	6	4	0	–	1	–	1	17
Okayama	46	17	8	5	2	1	–	–	–	–	13
Osaka	83	17	18	4	0	–	–	–	–	40	4
Sagamihara	46	15	8	4	6	4	–	1	0	0	8
Saitama	60	23	11	7	11	3	0	1	–	0	4
Sakai	48	9	11	4	1	–	–	–	–	18	5
Sapporo	68	26	10	10	19	1	0	–	–	1	1
Yokohama	86	33	16	9	16	2	0	0	–	1	9
Total	1,012	327	171	115	99	33	16	4	0	91	156
Source: NHK

== See also ==
- 2015 Japanese unified local elections
- 2023 Japanese unified local elections
