= 2015 Japanese unified local elections =

18th unified local elections

The first stage of the 18th unified local elections (第18回統一地方選挙, dai-jūhachi-kai tōitsu chihō senkyo) in Japan took place on April 12, 2015. The Liberal Democratic Party under leadership of Shinzo Abe was the overall victor, winning many races including all ten gubernatorial races and 1,153 of the 2,284 assembly seats at stake. Further elections for municipal mayors and assemblies took place on April 26.

In addition to indicating support for the Abe government, the elections were also seen as a referendum on the Japan Innovation Party, and particularly on Osaka mayor Toru Hashimoto's plan to restructure the Osaka prefectural government.

In the first stage, average turnout was estimated at 47.14%, the lowest in the history of Japanese unified elections and the first time that average turnout in unified elections fell below 50%. The total number of prefectural and designated city assembly candidates was also the lowest in history at 3,272, 501 of which (21.9% of seats) ran unopposed. The Democratic Party of Japan fielded 345 candidates, 40% less than the number fielded in the 2011 local elections. Chiba Prefecture had the lowest overall turnout rate at 37%. In the second stage, a record low 9,519 candidates ran for 7,682 seats, and a record high 3.6% of assembly seats were won by default.

== Results ==
=== Governors ===
Prefecture	Party	Candidate	Votes	%
Fukui Prefecture	Independent	Issei Nishikawa	242,544	80.4
Fukui Prefecture	Communist Party	Yukie Kanemoto	59,115	19.6
Fukuoka Prefecture	Independent	Hiroshi Ogawa	1,260,405	81.6
Fukuoka Prefecture	Independent	Tomikazu Goto	284,692	18.4
Hokkaido	Independent	Harumi Takahashi	1,496,915	56.6
Hokkaido	Independent	Noriyuki Sato	1,146,573	43.4
Kanagawa Prefecture	Independent	Yuji Kuroiwa	2,195,764	76.7
Kanagawa Prefecture	Independent	Hajime Okamoto	665,751	23.3
Mie Prefecture	Independent	Eikei Suzuki	603,697	85.7
Mie Prefecture	Independent	Shinichi Fuji	100,860	14.3
Nara Prefecture	Independent	Shōgo Arai	283,432	50.2
Nara Prefecture	Independent	Makoto Yamashita	227,687	40.3
Nara Prefecture	Communist Party	Kazuhiro Tanigawa	39,127	6.9
Nara Prefecture	Independent	Takahiko Iwasaki	14,903	2.6
Ōita Prefecture	Independent	Katsusada Hirose	342,583	62.2
Ōita Prefecture	Independent	Ban Kugimiya	178,277	32.4
Ōita Prefecture	Communist Party	Kai Yamashita	26,214	4.8
Ōita Prefecture	Independent	Takaaki Miisako	2,091	0.4
Ōita Prefecture	Independent	Yatsuo Ikezaki	1,855	0.3
Shimane Prefecture	Independent	Zenbee Mizoguchi	268,284	80.5
Shimane Prefecture	Communist Party	Hiromi Bandai	65,088	19.5
Tokushima Prefecture	Independent	Kamon Iizumi	201,364	80.2
Tokushima Prefecture	Communist Party	Michiyo Furata	49,562	19.8
Tottori Prefecture	Independent	Shinji Hirai	234,291	88.8
Tottori Prefecture	Independent	Naoyuki Iwanaga	29,425	11.2
Source: Yomiuri Shimbun

- Hokkaido: Incumbent Harumi Takahashi (LDP) defeated DPJ-supported television anchor Noriyuki Sato in one of two gubernatorial races contested between the government and opposition parties.
- Kanagawa Prefecture: Yuji Kuroiwa (LDP/NKP/DPJ) re-elected
- Fukui Prefecture: Issei Nishikawa (LDP/NKP/DPJ) re-elected
- Mie Prefecture: Eikei Suzuki (LDP/NKP) re-elected
- Nara Prefecture: Shōgo Arai (LDP/NKP/DPJ) re-elected
- Tottori Prefecture: Shinji Hirai (LDP/NKP/DPJ) re-elected
- Shimane Prefecture: Zenbee Mizoguchi (LDP/NKP) re-elected
- Tokushima Prefecture: Kamon Iizumi (LDP/NKP/DPJ) re-elected
- Fukuoka Prefecture: Hiroshi Ogawa (LDP/NKP/DPJ/JIP/SDP) re-elected
- Oita Prefecture: Incumbent Katsusada Hirose (LDP/NKP) defeated DPJ-supported ex-Oita City mayor Ban Kugimiya.

2015 was the first year that Tokyo did not elect a governor in the unified elections, as the elections in 2012 (following Shintaro Ishihara's resignation) and 2014 (following Naoki Inose's resignation) moved Tokyo's gubernatorial election cycle away from the unified election cycle.

== Mayoral elections ==
- Sapporo: Former deputy mayor Katsuhiro Akimoto (DPJ/JIP/SDP) defeated LDP-supported ex-government official Nana Honma in one of the few significant victories for the opposition bloc. Akimoto was supported by 12-year incumbent mayor Fumio Ueda and called for improving the city's attractiveness to businesses, while Honma advocated new infrastructure investments including an expansion of the municipal subway system.
- Sagamihara: Toshio Kayama (LDP/NKP/DPJ) re-elected
- Shizuoka: Nobuhiro Tanabe (LDP/NKP/DPJ) re-elected
- Hamamatsu: Yasutomo Suzuki (independent) re-elected
- Hiroshima: Kazumi Matsui (LDP/NKP/DPJ) re-elected
- The mayoral election in Nagasaki was uncontested for the first time in history, while the mayoral election in Tsu was uncontested for the first time in 37 years.
- In Shibuya, Tokyo, Ken Hasebe won the open contest for mayor following the retirement of Toshitake Kuwahara. Hasebe had previously submitted Shibuya's local ordinance permitting same-sex civil unions as an assembly member.

== Assembly elections ==
- The Osaka Restoration Association maintained its top position in both the Osaka Prefecture and Osaka City assemblies. However, it failed to win a majority in either assembly, and the LDP won additional seats in both assemblies, casting some doubt on the outcome of the scheduled May 17 referendum on the Osaka Metropolis plan.
- Two incumbents tied for an open seat in the Kumamoto City assembly with 4,515 votes each; the seat was to be decided by drawing lots.
- Chiyoda, Tokyo perennial candidate Teruki Gotō drew attention in international media by posing nude in his official election poster, with the characters of his name obscuring his genitals and with various nationalist icons in the background. The poster was deemed legal under both election and obscenity laws.
- Two deaf women were elected to city assemblies: Rie Saito of Kita, Tokyo and Atsuko Yanetani of Akashi, Hyogo. They are the second and third deaf legislators in Japanese history (after Sumie Sakurai who served on the assembly of Hakuba, Nagano from 2001 to 2005). The Kita assembly was reportedly considering using speech recognition software to allow Saito to participate in debate, while the Akashi assembly was considering hiring a sign language interpreter.

== See also ==
- 2019 Japanese unified local elections
