= 2019 Shimane gubernatorial election =

Election

← 2015	7 April 2019	2023 →
- Turnout: 58.34
Nominee	Tatsuya Maruyama	Seiji Ōba	Jirō Shimada
Party	Independent	Independent	Independent
Popular vote	150,338	120,276	40,694
Percentage	43.58	34.86	11.80
Nominee	Yasuko Yamasaki
Party	Independent
Popular vote	33,699
Percentage	9.77
Governor before election
Zenbee Mizoguchi
Independent
Elected Governor
Tatsuya Maruyama
Independent

A gubernatorial election was held on 7 April 2019 to elect the next governor of Shimane.

== Candidates ==
- Yasuko Yamasaki (山崎泰子, Yamasaki Yasuko) - president of the New Japan Women's Association Shimane Prefecture Headquarters, candidate for Matsue mayor in 2017, a native of Okayama City, and alumnus of the Shimane University Faculty of Election, age 57. Recommended by the Japanese Communist Party. Her candidacy was announced on 20 February 2019.
- Tatsuya Maruyama - former Civil Protection Manager of the Fire and Disaster Management Agency, a native of Hirokawa, Fukuoka and alumnus of the University of Tokyo Faculty of Law, age 49. His candidacy was announced on 17 January 2019.
- Jirō Shimada (島田二郎, Shimada Jirō) - native of and former mayor of Yasugi, Shimane and alumnus of Kanagawa Dental University, age 65. His candidacy was announced on 4 February.
- Seiji Ōba (大庭誠司, Ōba Seiji) - former deputy director of the Fire and Disaster Management Agency, a native of Matsue, Shimane, and alumnus of the University of Tokyo Faculty of Engineering, age 59. His candidacy was announced on 18 January 2019.

Masaaki Moritani (森谷公昭, Moritani Masaaki), a former city councillor at Hamada, Shimane, announced his candidacy, but was not listed among the four candidates.

== Results ==
2019 Shimane gubernatorial election
Party	Candidate	Votes	%	±%
LDP	Tatsuya Maruyama	150.338	43.58	n/a
LDP	Seiji Ōba	120.276	34.86	− 45.62
LDP	Jirō Shimada	40.694	11.80	n/a
JCP	Yasuko Yamasaki	33.699	9.77	− 9.75
Turnout		350.031	62.04	+2.48
Registered electors		564.244		
LDP hold		Swing	n/a	
