= 2023 Japanese unified local elections =

41 Prefectural Assembly elections
- 9 April 2023
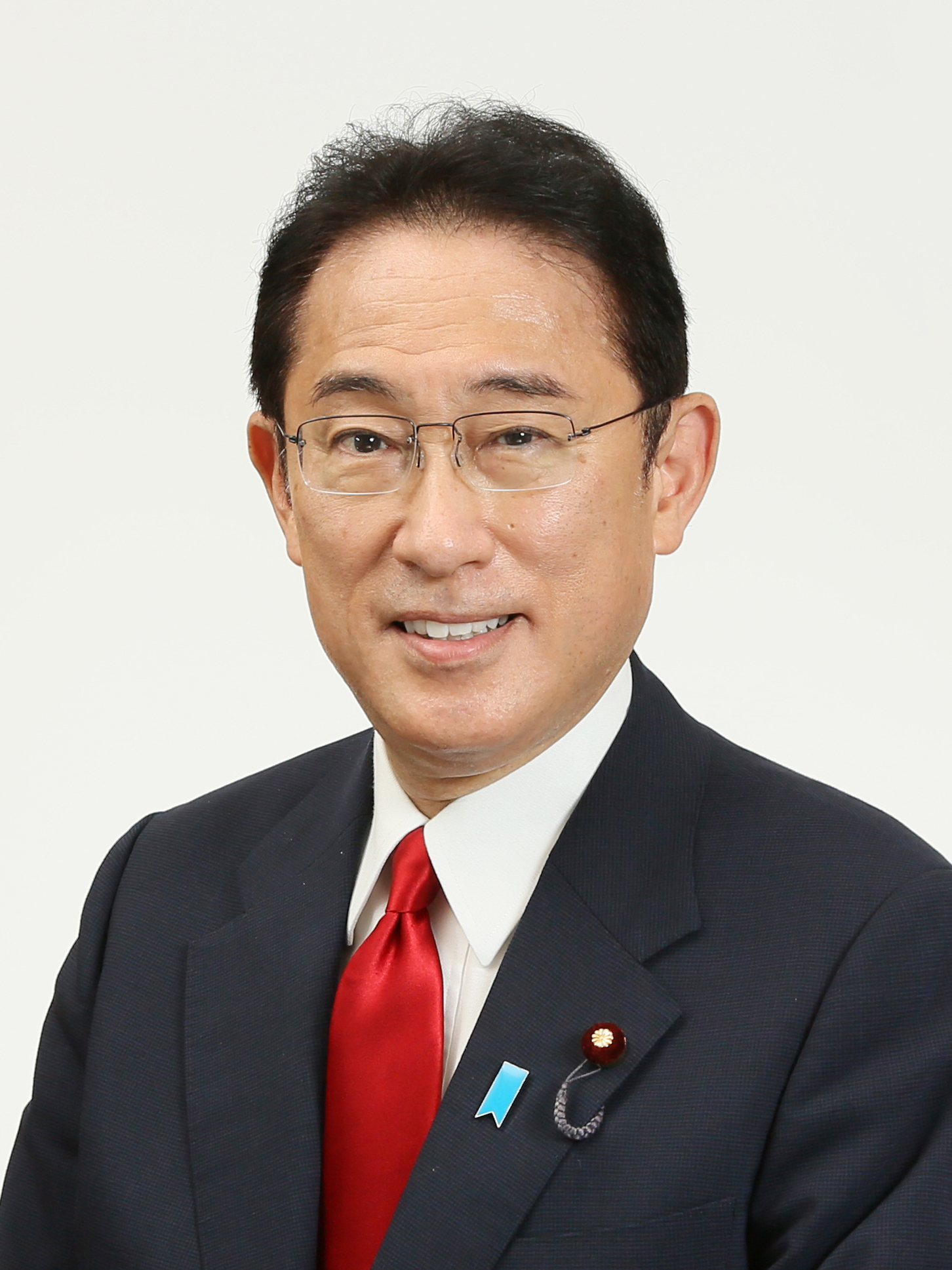

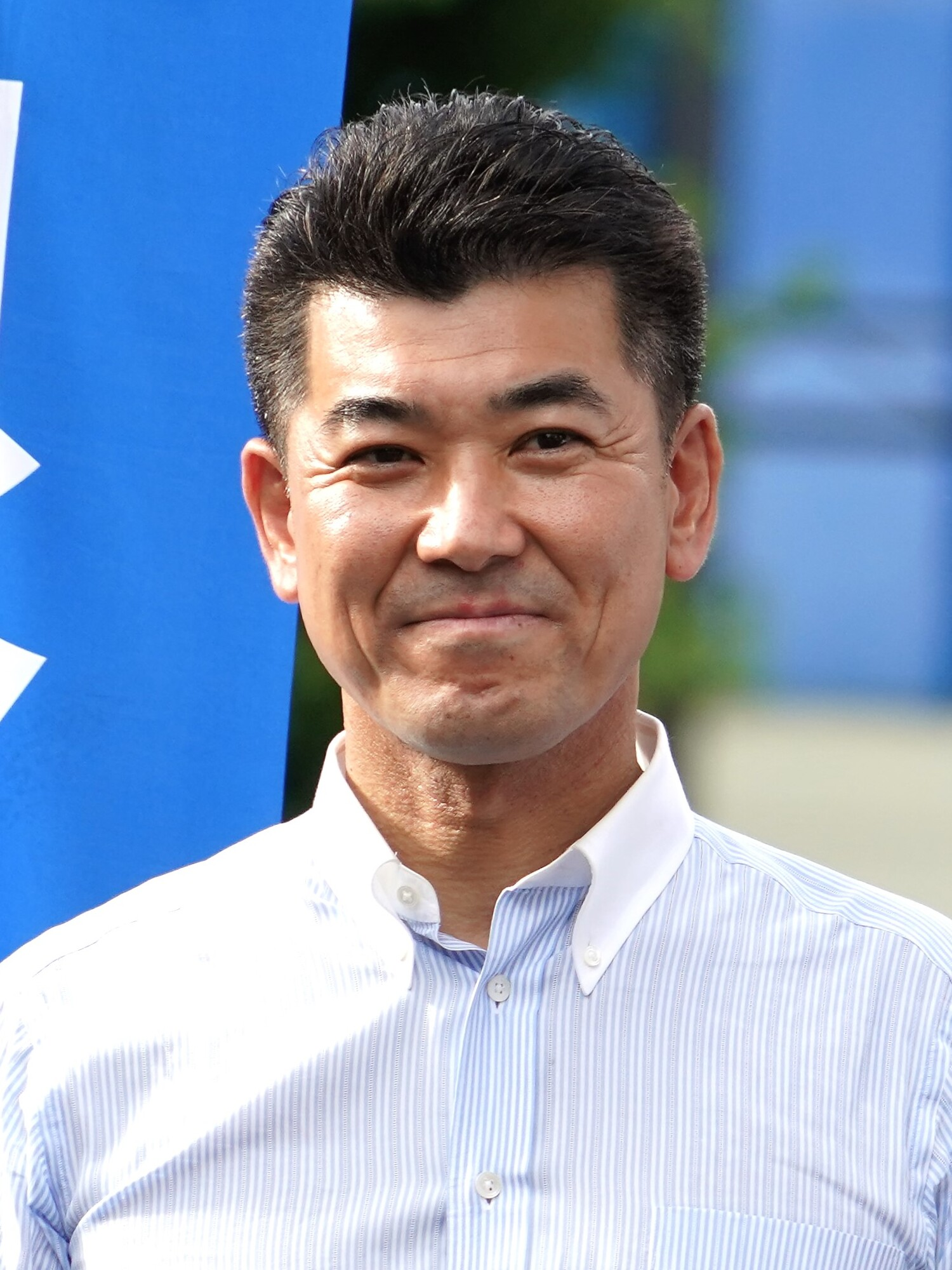

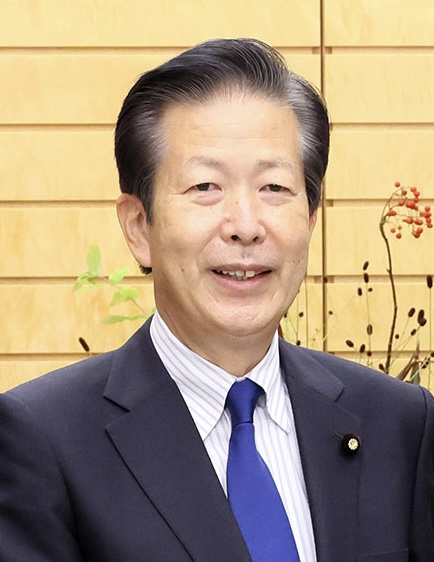

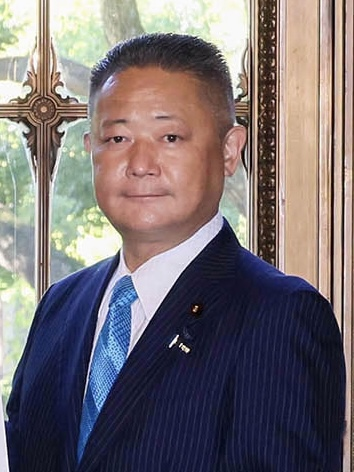

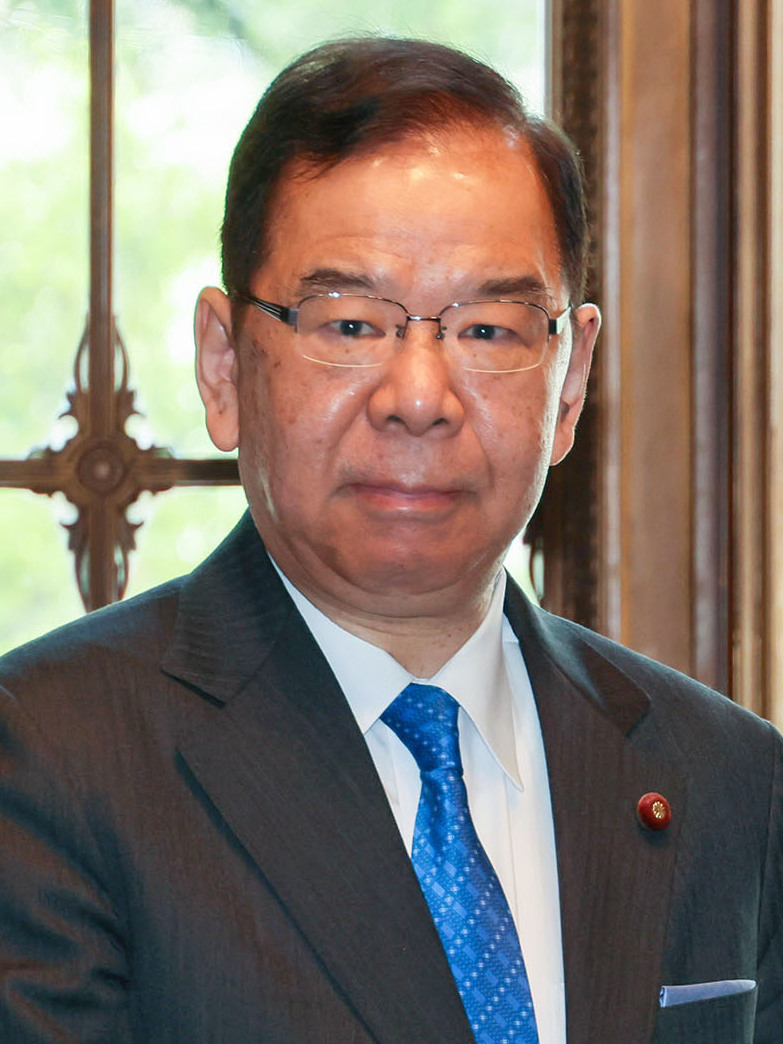

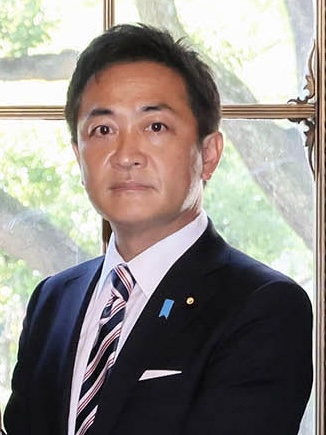

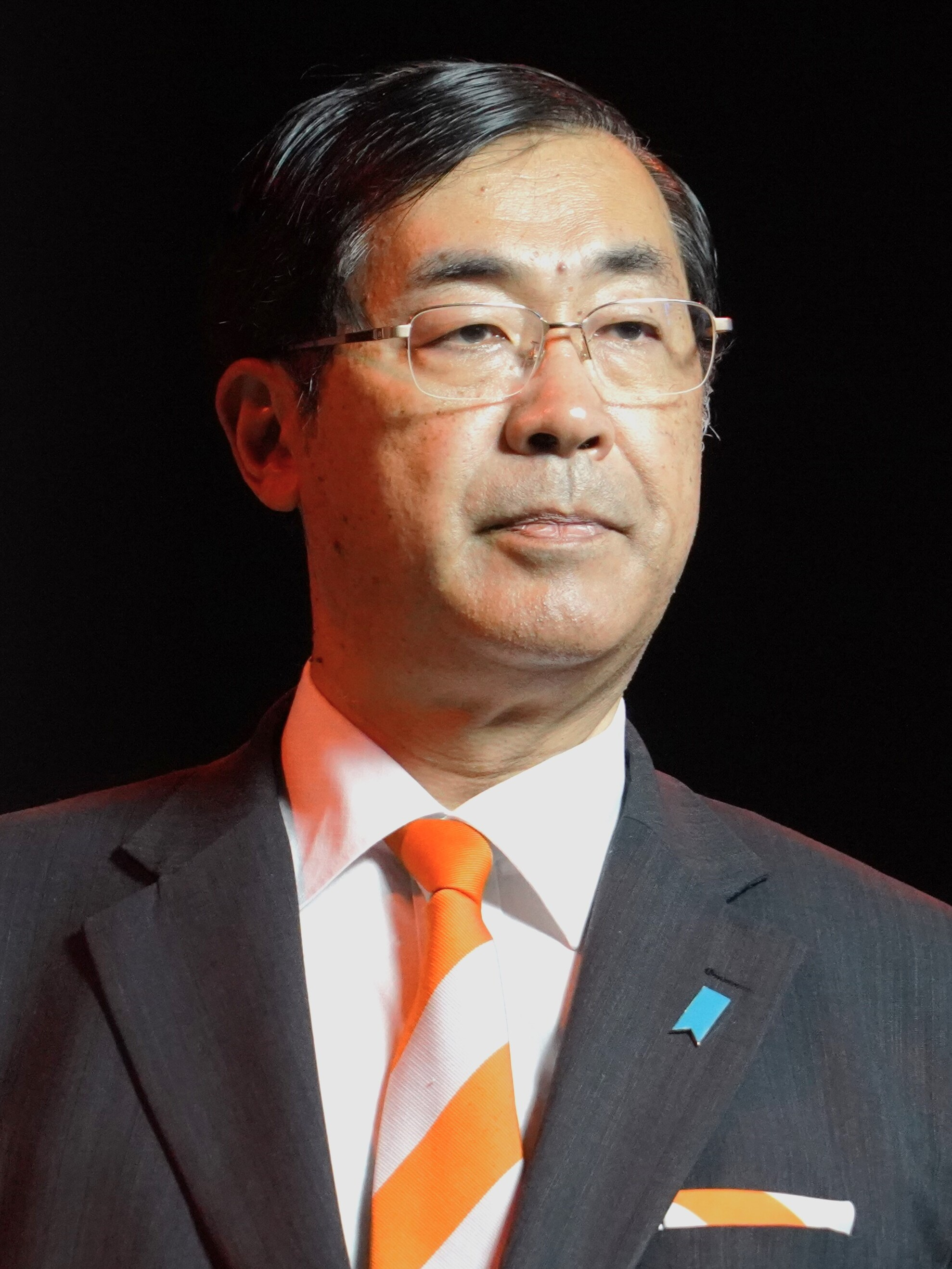

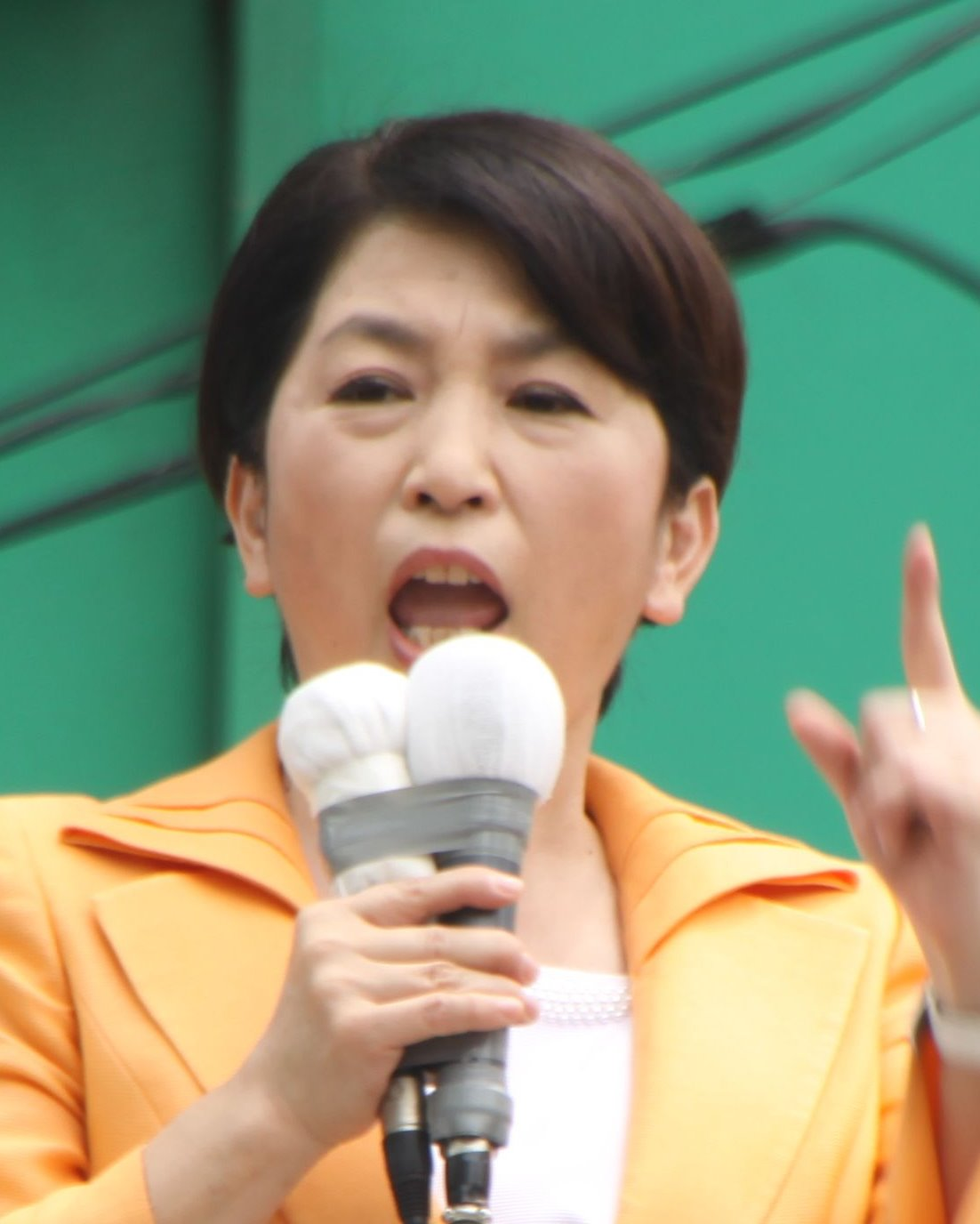
	First party	Second party	Third party
Leader	Fumio Kishida	Kenta Izumi	Natsuo Yamaguchi
Party	LDP	CDP	Komeito
Leader since	29 September 2021	30 November 2021	8 September 2009
Last election	1158 seats	Did not exist	166 seats
Seats won	1,153	185	169
Seat change	▼5	New	▲3
	Fourth party	Fifth party	Sixth party
Leader	Nobuyuki Baba	Kazuo Shii	Yuichiro Tamaki
Party	Ishin	JCP	DPP
Leader since	27 August 2022	24 November 2000	11 September 2020
Last election	67 seats	99 seats	Did not exist
Seats won	124	75	9
Seat change	▲57	▼24	New
	Seventh party	Eighth party
Leader	Manabu Matsuda	Mizuho Fukushima
Party	Sanseitō	Social Democratic
Leader since	15 July 2022	23 February 2020
Last election	Did not exist	22 seats
Seats won	4	3
Seat change	New	▼19

The 2023 Japanese unified local elections were held across the country on 9 and 23 April 2023. In total 15,047 candidates were elected in 1,008 races with a high of 1,685 in Hokkaido and a low of 1 in Okinawa.

The ruling Liberal Democratic Party (LDP) scored a comfortable victory. Six LDP (and Komei) endorsed candidates won the governorship. The LDP also managed to win more than half of all the prefectural assembly seats in the prefecture that held elections.

Major victories were also won by Nippon Ishin no Kai. In addition to winning in its home base of Osaka, Ishin also won the contest for governor of Nara and increased the number of seats it now holds in neighboring prefectures. The party secured majorities in the Osaka prefectural and municipal assemblies for the first time ever, and they even took home six seats in the Kanagawa Prefectural Assembly.

Turnouts this month were at record lows for all elections with the exception of the Hakodate mayoral contest and mayoral and assembly races in Tokyo wards which were higher than the last election but still did not top 50%.

This maintains a pattern in Japan, where fewer and fewer people are casting ballots ever since the LDP took back control in 2012.

== Background ==
=== LDP's declining popularity and Kishida's attempts to rebound it ===
Since the assassination of former prime minister Shinzo Abe, the historically dominant LDP began to face strong criticism over its link to the Unification Church. Abe's murderer Tetsuya Yamagami had claimed that his family was bankrupted by the church. Soon after the assassination, the Japanese media ventured into investigations which unearthed pervasive links between some of the LDP's senior politicians and the church, leading to a decline in the LDP's approval.

However, Prime Minister Fumio Kishida ramped up efforts to salvage his party's reputation. He promised to double defense spending and held a meeting with the South Korean President. He also paid a surprise visit to Ukraine. These foreign and defense policy achievements bolstered his approval rating.

=== Candidate shortage ===
One of the most critical issues of this election was a shortage of candidates. 556 candidates in nearly 40% of the districts ran uncontested. This reflected the increasingly dysfunctional nature of Japanese society due to its rapid population decline.

=== April elections by prefecture in Stage 1 and 2 ===
1008 elections were held across all prefectures. The number of elections held by prefecture varied greatly from a low of one in Toyama and Okinawa prefectures to a high of 177 in the prefecture of Hokkaido which was by far the largest number.

Stage 1 on 9 April featured the following elections:

Prefectural governor	Prefectural assembly	Designated major city mayor	Designated major city assembly
9	41	6	16

Stage 2 on 23 April featured the following elections:

City mayor	City assembly	Special ward mayor	Special ward assembly	Town mayor	Town assembly	Village mayor	Village assembly
88	306	12	21	97	296	28	88

This is the total list of all elections held on 9 and 23 April broken down by prefecture and position:

Prefecture		9 April 2023 Elections				23 April 2023 Elections								
都道府県	Prefecture	Governor	Assembly	Designated major city		Other city		Special ward		Town		Village		Total by Prefecture
都道府県	Prefecture	Governor	Assembly	mayor	assembly	mayor	assembly	mayor	assembly	mayor	assembly	mayor	assembly	Total by Prefecture
愛知県	Aichi		1		1	6	23			2	12	1	2	48
秋田県	Akita		1			1	2						2	6
青森県	Aomori		1			1	4			1	11		6	24
千葉県	Chiba		1		1	4	17			1	5			29
愛媛	Ehime		1				1							2
福井県	Fukui	1	1			1	3				3			9
福岡県	Fukuoka		1		1	3	14			7	15			41
福島県	Fukushima						1			3	2	2	4	12
岐阜県	Gifu		1			4	10			3	7	1	1	27
群馬県	Gunma		1			2	8			3	8	3	6	31
広島県	Hiroshima		1	1	1	2	3			1	2			11
北海道	Hokkaido	1	1	1	1	11	27			31	86	4	14	177
兵庫県	Hyogo		1		1	3	9			1	2			17
茨城県	Ibaraki					3	13			2	3	1	1	23
石川県	Ishikawa		1			2	5			1	5			14
岩手県	Iwate					1	1			1	3			6
香川県	Kagawa		1			2	5				4			12
鹿児島	Kagoshima		1				3			2	4		1	11
神奈川県	Kanagawa	1	1	1	3	3	10			2	5			26
高知県	Kochi		1				3			2	7	1	3	17
熊本県	Kumamoto		1		1	1	4			7	10	1	3	28
京都府	Kyoto		1		1	3	6				2			13
三重県	Mie		1			2	4			2	2			11
宮城県	Miyagi									1	1	1	1	4
宮崎県	Miyazaki		1				7			3	6	1	3	21
長野県	Nagano		1			2	7			3	13	4	15	45
長崎県	Nagasaki		1			2	3			2	5			13
奈良県	Nara	1	1			3	6			1	11	3	7	33
新潟県	Niigata		1		1	1	5				2		3	13
大分県	Oita	1	1			2	7				1		1	13
岡山	Okayama		1		1		2				1		2	7
沖縄県	Okinawa											1		1
大阪府	Osaka	1	1	1	1	10	17				4			35
佐賀県	Saga		1				3			1	3			8
埼玉県	Saitama		1		1	2	20			1	12			37
滋賀県	Shiga		1				4			1	2			8
島根県	Shimane	1	1								1		1	4
静岡県	Shizuoka		1	2	1	1	7			3	6			21
栃木県	Tochigi		1			1	5			2	5			14
徳島県	Tokushima	1	1			1	2			4	5		1	15
東京都	Tokyo					4	20	12	21	1	2	1	4	65
鳥取県	Tottori	1	1								2	1	1	6
富山県	Toyama		1											1
和歌山県	Wakayama		1				3			1	5			10
山形県	Yamagata		1			1	6				8	1	1	18
山口県	Yamaguchi		1			1	2				2			6
山梨県	Yamanashi		1			2	4			1	1	1	5	15
Total Positions		9	41	6	16	88	306	12	21	97	296	28	88	1008

== Results ==
=== Stage 1: 9 April ===
The LDP secured a comfortable victory in the elections. It won six of the nine gubernatorial races that were in play. Particularly pleasing for the party was its victory in Hokkaido, where the centre-left party CDP had been historically strong. The LDP however failed to do well in Western Japan, notably in Osaka and Nara.

The Japan Innovation Party's victory also attracted significant attention, with political analysts predicting a strong future for it in the second round of local elections and at the national stage.

Voter turnout for the all the gubernatorial elections was 46.8% while the average voter turnout for the mayoral elections in designated cities was 46.6%.

==== Voter turnout ====
===== Gubernatorial Elections =====
Hokkaido	Kanazawa	Fukui	Osaka	Nara	Tottori	Shimane	Tokushima	Oita	Total
51.7%	40.4%	51.1%	47.0%	54.8%	48.8%	55.0%	54.6%	51.5%	46.8%

===== Designated City Mayoral Elections =====
Sapporo	Sagamihara	Shizuoka	Hamamatsu	Osaka	Hiroshima	Total
51.0%	45.5%	45.6%	49.4%	48.3%	34.5%	46.6%

==== Governors ====
LDP=Liberal Democratic Party CDP=Constitutional Democratic Party Komeito=Komei JCP=Japan Communist Party NIK=Nippon Ishin no Kai (also refers to Osaka Ishin no Kai) DPFP=Democratic Party for the People SDP=Social Democratic Party, Sanseito=Sansei, Seijika Joshi 48 Party=48

- * denotes prefectural chapter

	Turnout (%)	Party	Endorsed by (Recommended by)	Candidate	Votes	%
Fukui Prefecture	51.08	Ind	LDP, CDP, Komei	Tatsuji Sugimoto	282,097	89.6
Fukui Prefecture	51.08	JCP		Yukie Kanemoto	32,778	10.4
Hokkaido	51.70	Ind	LDP, Komeito, NPD	Naomichi Suzuki	1,692,436	75.6
Hokkaido	51.70	Ind	CDP (JCP, *DPFP, SDP, Netto Hokkaido)	Maki Ikeda	479,678	21.4
Hokkaido	51.70	Ind		Yoshio Monbetsu	40,579	1.8
Hokkaido	51.70	Ind		Daisuke Mihara	24,978	1.1
Kanagawa Prefecture	40.35	Ind	*LDP, *Komei, *DPFP	Yuji Kuroiwa	1,933,753	67.6
Kanagawa Prefecture	40.35	Ind	JCP	Makiko Kishi	651,473	22.8
Kanagawa Prefecture	40.35	48		Ayaka Otsu	151,361	5.3
Kanagawa Prefecture	40.35	Ind		Kenichiro Kato	123,922	4.3
Nara Prefecture	54.82	Ishin		Makoto Yamashita	266,404	44.4
Nara Prefecture	54.82	Ind	*CDP	Shou Hiraki	196,729	32.8
Nara Prefecture	54.82	Ind	*DPFP	Shōgo Arai	97,033	16.2
Nara Prefecture	54.82	Ind	JCP	Itsuzō Oguchi	19,861	3.3
Nara Prefecture	54.82	Ind		Nobuko Nishiguchi	13,034	2.2
Nara Prefecture	54.82	Ind		Takashi Hatano	6,806	1.1
Ōita Prefecture	51.45	Ind	LDP, *Komeito	Kiichiro Sato	271,400	57.3
Ōita Prefecture	51.45	Ind		Kiyoshi Adachi	202,623	42.7
Osaka Prefecture	46.98	Osaka Ishin		Hirofumi Yoshimura	2,439,444	73.7
Osaka Prefecture	46.98	Ind		Mayumi Taniguchi	437,972	13.2
Osaka Prefecture	46.98	Ind	JCP	Kotaro Tatsumi	263,355	8.0
Osaka Prefecture	46.98	Sansei		Toshiaki Yoshino	114,764	3.5
Osaka Prefecture	46.98	48		Sayaka Sato	32,459	1.0
Osaka Prefecture	46.98	Other		Hideya Inagaki	22,367	0.7
Shimane Prefecture	54.96	Ind	LDP, CDP, Komeito, DPFP	Tatsuya Maruyama	251,545	86.3
Shimane Prefecture	54.96	JCP		Shinichi Mukose	29,964	10.3
Shimane Prefecture	54.96	Other		Masaaki Moritane	10,083	3.5
Tokushima Prefecture	54.60	Ind		Masazumi Gotoda	130,993	40.0
Tokushima Prefecture	54.60	Ind		Tōru Miki	100,309	30.6
Tokushima Prefecture	54.60	Ind	*LDP	Kamon Iizumi	85,956	26.2
Tokushima Prefecture	54.60	JCP		Motonori Furuta	10,546	3.2
Tottori Prefecture	48.85	Ind	*LDP, *CDP, *Komeito	Shinji Hirai	200,442	91.8
Tottori Prefecture	48.85	JCP		Hideyuki Fukuzumi	17,822	8.2
Source: NHK

==== Prefectural assemblies ====
LDP=Liberal Democratic Party CDP=Constitutional Democratic Party Komeito=Komei JCP=Japan Communist Party *NIK=Nippon Ishin no Kai (also refers to Osaka Ishin no Kai) DPFP=Democratic Party for the People SDP=Social Democratic Party Sanseito=Sansei

	SEATS WON									
Prefecture	LDP	CDP	ISHIN	KOMEI	JCP	DPFP	SDP	SANSEI	OTHER	IND
Hokkaido	49	23	1	8	2	0	0	0	0	17
Aomori	25	5	0	2	3	0	0	1	0	12
Iwate	0	0	0	0	0	0	0	0	0	0
Miyagi	0	0	0	0	0	0	0	0	0	0
Akita	24	4	0	1	1	0	0	0	0	11
Yamagata	26	3	0	1	2	1	0	0	0	10
Fukushima	0	0	0	0	0	0	0	0	0	0
Ibaraki	0	0	0	0	0	0	0	0	0	0
Tochigi	29	3	1	3	1	0	0	0	0	13
Gunma	27	4	1	3	2	0	0	0	0	13
Saitama	53	10	1	9	3	0	0	0	1	16
Chiba	44	15	1	8	4	2	0	0	1	20
Tokyo	0	0	0	0	0	0	0	0	0	0
Tokyo Wards	0	0	0	0	0	0	0	0	0	0
Kanagawa	48	26	6	8	2	0	0	0	1	14
Niigata	28	2	0	2	0	1	0	0	0	20
Toyama	31	3	0	1	1	0	0	0	0	4
Ishikawa	30	2	0	2	1	0	1	1	0	4
Fukui	18	2	0	1	0	0	0	1	0	15
Yamanashi	17	1	0	1	2	0	0	0	0	16
Nagano	22	3	0	5	6	0	0	0	0	21
Gifu	32	1	0	2	1	3	0	0	0	7
Shizuoka	38	2	0	5	0	1	0	0	0	22
Aichi	58	9	0	5	1	4	0	0	3	22
Mie	21	1	0	2	1	0	0	0	8	15
Shiga	21	2	3	2	2	1	0	0	6	7
Kyoto	28	3	9	5	9	4	0	0	0	2
Osaka	7	1	55	14	1	0	0	0		1
Hyogo	24	4	21	13	2	0	0	0	0	22
Nara	17	2	14	3	1	0	0	0	0	6
Wakayama	27	1	3	3	1	1	0	0	0	6
Tottori	15	7	0	3	1	0	0	0	0	9
Shimane	21	1	0	2	2	1	0	0	0	9
Okayama	32	3	0	6	3	1	0	0	0	10
Hiroshima	29	1	0	6	2	0	0	0	0	26
Yamaguchi	25	0	0	5	3	1	0	0	1	12
Tokushima	21	1	1	2	1	0	0	0	0	12
Kagawa	25	3	1	2	1	5	0	0	0	4
Ehime	21	2	1	3	1	0	0	0	0	19
Kochi	19	1	0	3	6	0	0	0	0	8
Fukuoka	40	14	3	10	0	1	0	0	1	18
Saga	27	5	0	2	1	0	0	0	0	2
Nagasaki	29	3	0	3	1	3	2	0	0	5
Kumamoto	31	3	1	3	0	0	0	1	1	9
Oita	17	3	1	3	2	1	0	0	0	16
Miyazaki	24	4	0	4	1	0	0	0	0	6
Kagoshima	33	2	0	3	1	0	0	0	0	12
Okinawa	0	0	0	0	0	0	0	0	0	0
TOTALS	1153	185	124	169	75	31	3	4	23	493

Source NHK & Ministry of Internal Affairs and Communications

==== Mayors of Designated Cities ====
Designated city	Turnout (%)	Party	Endorsed by	Candidate	Votes	%
Hamamatsu	49.44	Independent	LDP, Komeito	Yusuke Nakano	246,745	80.3
Hamamatsu	49.44	Independent	JCP	Hiroshi Shimada	60,530	19.7
Hiroshima	34.53	Independent	LDP, Komeito	Kazumi Matsui	258,336	80.0
Hiroshima	34.53	Communist Party		Atsumi Takami	36,595	11.3
Hiroshima	34.53	Independent		Hiroshi Oyama	28,186	8.7
Osaka	48.33	Osaka Ishin no Kai		Hideyuki Yokoyama	655,802	64.6
Osaka	48.33	Independent		Taeko Kitano	268,227	26.4
Osaka	48.33	Independent		Toshihiko Yamazaki	45,369	4.5
Osaka	48.33	Independent		Yasuhiko Aramaki	30,960	3.0
Osaka	48.33	Independent		Nepentha	15,408	1.5
Sagamihara	45.55	Independent		Kentaro Motomura	196,213	74.4
Sagamihara	45.55	Independent	JCP	Yumiko Tatebe	18,731	17.1
Sagamihara	45.55	Independent		Kota Numakura	17,844	6.8
Sagamihara	45.55	Independent		Hiroyuki Nomoto	17,557	6.7
Sagamihara	45.55	Association for Creating the Future of Sagamihara		Toshiko Takeshima	13,505	5.1
Sapporo	50.99	Independent	CDP, Daiichi	Katsuhiro Akimoto	458,221	56.0
Sapporo	50.99	Independent		Kaoru Takano	234,834	28.7
Sapporo	50.99	Independent	JCP	Hideo Kibata	124,692	15.2
Shizuoka	45.61	Independent	LDP, CDP, Komeito, DPFP	Takashi Nanba	149,117	58.0
Shizuoka	45.61	Independent		Makoto Yamada	80,829	31.4
Shizuoka	45.61	Communist Party		Chika Suzuki	27,197	10.6
Source: NHK

==== Designated city assemblies ====
LDP=Liberal Democratic Party CDP=Constitutional Democratic Party JCP=Japan Communist Party *NIK=Nippon Ishin no Kai (also refers to Osaka Ishin no Kai) DPFP=Democratic Party for the People SDP=Social Democratic Party

Designated city	Total seats	Seats won									
Designated city	Total seats	LDP	Komeito	CDP	JCP	*NIK	DPFP	SDP	Sanseitō	Others	Ind.
Chiba	50	14	8	8	7	4				1	8
Fukuoka	62	19	12	7	4	7	1		1	1	10
Hamamatsu	46	7	5	1	3						30
Hiroshima	54	17	8		6	3		2			18
Kawasaki	60	17	11	12	8	7	1				4
Kobe	65	17	12	5	9	15	1			2	4
Kumamoto	48	21	7	3	2	1	1		2		11
Kyoto	67	19	11	2	14	10	3			5	3
Nagoya	68	20	12	13	3	1	4			14	1
Niigata	50	15	4	4	6	2		1		1	17
Okayama	46	17	8	3	4	1					13
Osaka	81	11	18		2	46					4
Sagamihara	46	12	8	8	2	4				2	10
Saitama	60	19	11	12	6	4		1		1	6
Sakai	48	7	11	1	5	18					6
Sapporo	68	26	10	18	7	5				1	1
Yokohama	86	34	15	15	5	8	3				6
Total	1,005	292	171	112	93	136	14	4	3	28	152
Source: Asahi Shimbun

=== Stage II: 23 April ===
After the elections on 23 April the make up of prefectures, cities, Tokyo special wards, towns, and villages which held elections during the first and second stages, look like this

RACE	LDP	CDP	Ishin	Komeito	JCP	DPFP	Reiwa	SDP	48	Sansei	Other	Ind.	Totals
Governorship	0	0	2	0	0	0	0	0	0	0	0	7	9
Prefectural Assembly	1153	185	128	169	75	31	0	3	0	4	23	493	2264
City/Ward Mayor	0	0	4	0	0	0	0	0	0	0	0	95	99
Town/Village Head	0	0	1	0	0	0	0	0	0	0	0	124	125
City/Ward Council	1226	463	273	1206	747	101	39	31	1	83	334	3949	8453
Town/Village Council	31	23	17	168	255	6	0	4	0	13	30	3554	4101
Totals	2410	671	366	1543	1077	138	39	38	1	100	442	8222	15047

==== Voter Turnout ====
Elections in both town and villages, and cities recorded record low turnouts.

Cities: 63 mayoral races/47.73%, 280 city council elections/44.26%

Towns/Villages: 55 mayoral (heads) races/60.79%, 250 council elections/55.49%.

== Aftermath and reactions ==
Anticipation began to grow that, banking on the success of the local elections, Prime Minister Kishida may call a snap general election.

LDP election Chief Hiroshi Moriyama was quoted as saying, "People have recognized our achievements."

== See also ==
- 2019 Japanese unified local elections
