= 2023 Tottori gubernatorial election =

Local election in Japan

- 9 April 2023
- Turnout: 48.85% ▼4.24%
Candidate	Shinji Hirai	Hideyuki Fukuzumi
Party	LDP	JCP
Popular vote	200,442	17,822
Percentage	91.83%	8.17%
Governor before election
Shinji Hirai
LDP
Elected Governor
Shinji Hirai
LDP

The 2023 Tottori gubernatorial election was held on 9 April 2023 to elect the next governor of Tottori. The incumbent Liberal Democratic Party governor won in a landslide re-election. It was held as part of the 2023 Japanese unified local elections.

The candidates were shared with the previous election, making this election an electoral rematch.

== Candidates ==
- Shinji Hirai, a member of the LDP, backed by the CDP, Komeito, DPFP.
- Hideyuki Fukuzumi, a member of the JCP.

== Results ==
Tottori gubernatorial 2023
Party	Candidate	Votes	%	±%
LDP	Shinji Hirai*	200,442	91.83%	−0.43%
JCP	Hideyuki Fukuzumi	17,822	8.17%	+2.43%
Turnout		218,264	48.85%	−2.24%
Registered electors		467,148		
LDP hold		Swing	-0.43	
