= 2023 Nara gubernatorial election =

- 9 April 2023
- Turnout: 54.82%▲6.33%
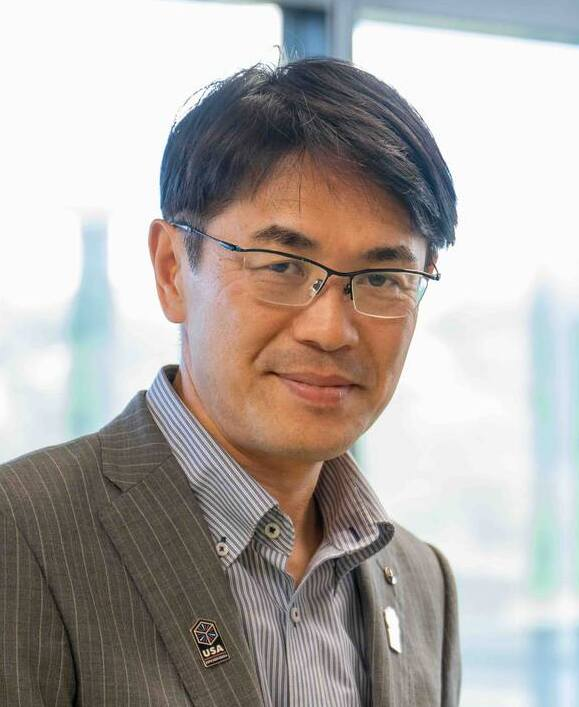

Nominee	Makoto Yamashita	Shou Hiraki	Shōgo Arai
Party	Ishin	Independent	Independent
Popular vote	266,404	196,729	97,033
Percentage	44.41%	32.80%	16.18%
Governor before election
Shōgo Arai
Independent
Elected Governor
Makoto Yamashita
Ishin

The 2023 Nara gubernatorial election was held on 9 April 2023 as part of the 20th unified elections to elect the next governor of Nara Prefecture, Japan. The election was close, with Makoto Yamashita of the Japan Innovation Party winning with a 44.41% minority, defeating incumbent Liberal Democratic Party candidate Shōgo Arai. This marks the first time a member of the Japan Restoration Party was elected outside of Osaka Prefecture.
