= 2023 Kanagawa gubernatorial election =

- 9 April 2023
- Turnout: 40.35% ▲0.07%
Candidate	Yūji Kuroiwa	Makiko Kishi	Ayaka Otsu
Party	Independent	JCP	Mintsuku
Popular vote	1,933,753	651,473	151,361
Percentage	67.60%	22.77%	5.29%
Governor before election
Yūji Kuroiwa
Independent
Elected Governor
Yūji Kuroiwa
Independent

The 2023 Kanagawa gubernatorial election was held on April 9, 2023, as part of 2023 Japanese unified local elections, to elect the next governor of Kanagawa. The election resulted in a victory for the incumbent governor Yūji Kuroiwa. The election occurred the same day as the 2023 Sagamihara mayoral election and the 2023 Kanagawa prefectural assembly election.

== Candidates ==
- Yuji Kuroiwa, incumbent governor, running as independent but endorsed by the Liberal Democratic Party of Japan, Democratic Party of Japan, and Komeito.
- Makiko Kishi, citizen representative, endorsed by Japanese Communist Party.
- Ayaka Otsu, former actress and disputed leader of The Collaborative Party.
- Kenichiro Kato, Physician, running as an independent and receiving zero party endorsement.

=== Withdrawn Candidates ===
- Hirohiko Terada, head of a non-profit organization, announced candidacy, but did not register by the deadline.

=== Discussed Candidates that denied to run ===
- Shuhei Chiba, secretary of Shigefumi Matsuzawa, proposed candidate from Japan Restoration Party, nomination cancelled due to lack of preparation.
- Juna Ichikawa, The Collaborative Party announced her as an official candidate, however was denied in favor of Ayakja Ostu.
