= 2023 Shimane gubernatorial election =

Local election in Japan

- 7 April 2019
- Turnout: 54.96% (▼7.08%)
Nominee	Tatsuya Maruyama	Shinichi Mukoze	Kimiaki Moriya
Party	Independent	JCP
Popular vote	251,545	29,964	10,083
Percentage	86.27%	10.28%	3.46%
Governor before election
Tatsuya Maruyama
Independent
Elected Governor
Tatsuya Maruyama
Independent

The 2023 Shimane gubernatorial election was an election to elect the governor of Shimane during the 2023 Japanese unified local elections on April 9, 2023. The election resulted in the incumbent governor Tatsuya Maruyama being re-elected with an 86.27% majority.

The election was concurrent with the 2023 Shimane Prefectural Assembly election.
