= Makoto Yamashita =

Japanese politician

- 山下 真
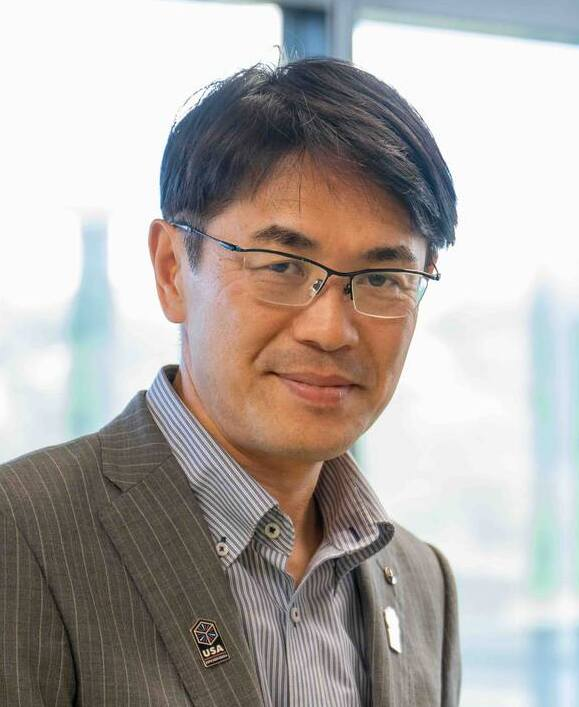
- Yamashita in 2024

Governor of Nara Prefecture
- Incumbent
- Assumed office May 3, 2023
- Monarch: Naruhito
- Preceded by: Shōgo Arai

10th Mayor of Ikoma
- In office February 3, 2006 – February 26, 2015
- Preceded by: Kōichi Nakamoto
- Succeeded by: Masashi Komurasaki

Personal details
- Born: June 1968 (age 58) Makioka, Yamanashi, Japan
- Party: Innovation
- Children: 2
- Education: University of Tokyo; University of Kyoto
- Occupation: Journalist, Lawyer
- Website: https://yamashitamakoto.com

Makoto Yamashita (山下真, Yamashita Makoto; born June 1968) is a Japanese politician and the current governor of Nara Prefecture in Japan.

== Early life and career ==
Yamashita was born in Yamanashi Prefecture in June 1968. He graduated from the school of humanities at University of Tokyo and the school of law at the University of Kyoto. He worked as a journalist and lawyer.

== Political career ==
=== Mayor of Ikoma (2006–2015) ===
Yamashita became the mayor of Ikoma, Nara in 2006 after gathering 27,540 votes. He run for a second term in 2010 gathering 26,997 votes. He won again in 2014 for his last and final term as mayor.

=== 2015 Nara Prefectural gubernatorial election ===
In 2015 Yamashita announced in a press conference that he was planning on running as the governor of Nara Prefecture in the 2015 Nara Prefectural Gubernatorial Election. He resigned as the mayor of Ikoma in February 26. However, he lost the election to the incumbent, Shōgo Arai.

=== 2017 Nara city mayoral election ===
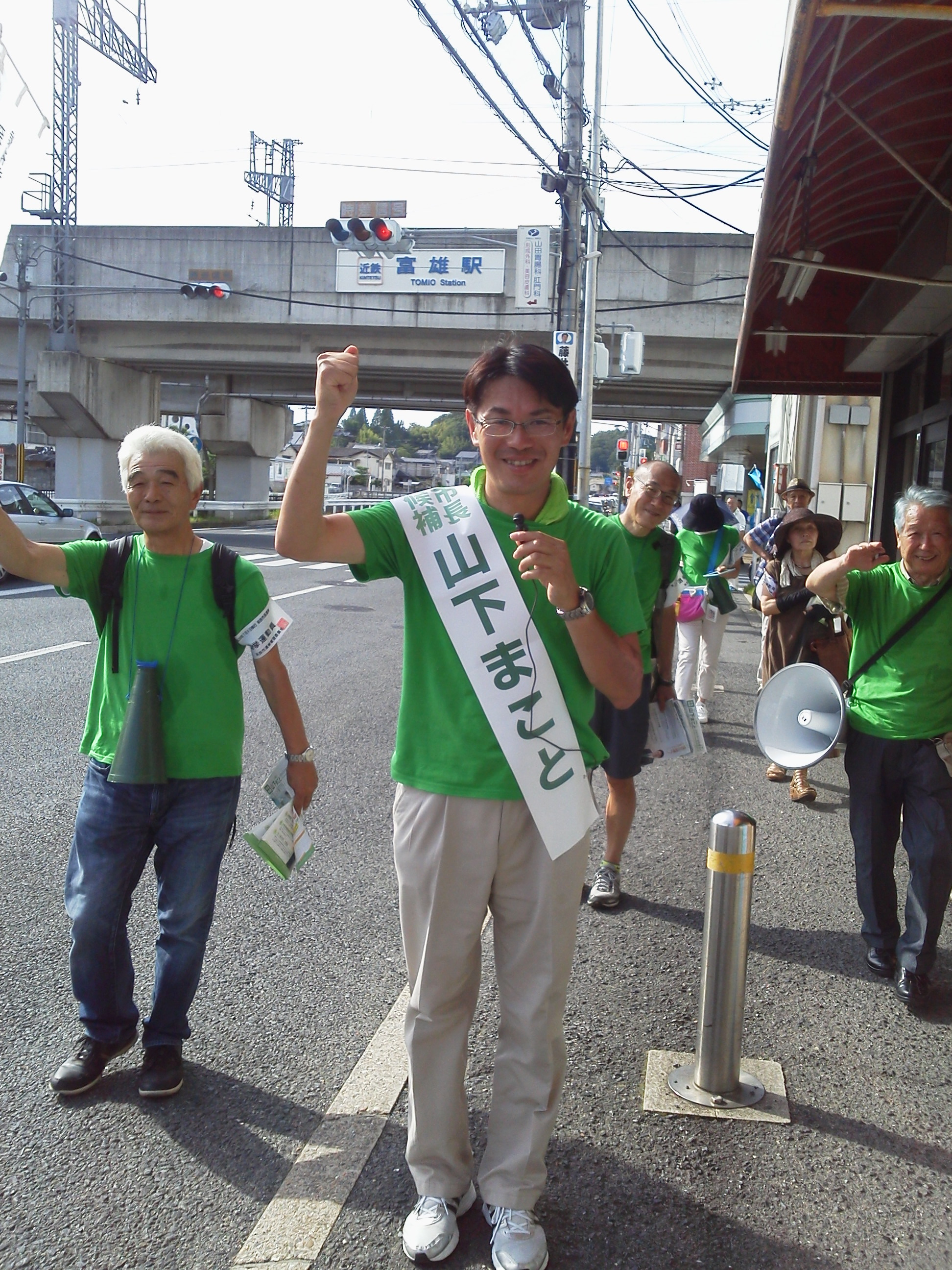
Yamashita campaigning in the Nara mayoral election held in July 2017 (near Kintetsu Tomio Station in Tomio Motomachi 2-chome, Nara City)

Yamashita run as the city mayor of Nara city in 2017, losing by a narrow margin to Gen Nakagawa. HE filed a petition requesting a recount on February 26, 2018, claiming that he was dissatisfied with the validity of the election, but the Nara City Election Commission rejected his request. He later filed a lawsuit in the Osaka High Court. However, the court dismiss the case.

=== Governor of Nara (2023 – present) ===
In 2023, secretary-general of the Japan Innovation Party (Ishin no Kai) in Nara, Morimoto Naoyuki endorsed Yamashita as the party's official candidate for the gubernatorial election in Nara.

Yamashita won the election after beating the Liberal Democratic Party's candidate Sho Hiraki. This was the first time an Innovation Party candidate won a gubernatorial election outside of Osaka.

== Personal life ==
Yamashita is married and has twin children.
