= 2023 Fukui gubernatorial election =

Japanese local election

- 9 April 2023
- Turnout: 51.08%
Candidate	Tatsuji Sugimoto	Yukie Kanemoto
Party	Independent	JCP
Popular vote	282,097	32,778
Percentage	89.6%	10.4%
Supported by	LDP, Komeito, CDP
Governor before election
Tatsuji Sugimoto
Independent
Elected Governor
Tatsuji Sugimoto
Independent

The 2023 Fukui gubernatorial election was held on 9 April 2023, to elect the next governor of Fukui Prefecture. It was held as part of the 2023 Japanese unified local elections. The incumbent governor of Fukui, an independent candidate, who was supported by the Liberal Democratic Party, Komeito, and the Constitutional Democratic Party, was reelected to a second term with a landslide victory.

Sugimoto faced limited competition, with the main contest coming in the form of Japanese Communist Party candidate Yuki Kanemoto.
