= 2019 Tottori gubernatorial election =

Local election in Japan

- 7 April 2019
- Turnout: 53.09 ▼3.87
Candidate	Shinji Hirai	Hideyuki Fukuzumi
Party	LDP	JCP
Popular vote	225,883	14,056
Percentage	92.26%	5.74%
Governor before election
Shinji Hirai
Independent
Elected Governor
Shinji Hirai
Independent

The 2019 Tottori gubernatorial election was held on 7 April 2019 to elect the next governor of Tottori. The incumbent Liberal Democratic Party governor won in a landslide re-election.

== Candidates ==
- Shinji Hirai* back by LDP, CDP, Komeito, DPFP.
- Hideyuki Fukuzumi for the JCP.
- Hiroshi Inoue.

== Results ==
Tottori gubernatorial 2019
Party	Candidate	Votes	%	±%
LDP	Shinji Hirai*	225,883	92.26	+ 3.42
JCP	Hideyuki Fukuzumi	14,056	5.74	− 5.42
Independent	Hiroshi Inoue	4,905	2.00	n/a
Turnout		248,028	53.09	− 3.87
Registered electors		467,148		
LDP hold		Swing	+ 3.42	
