= Toshio Kayama =

Japanese politician (born 1945)

- 加山 俊夫
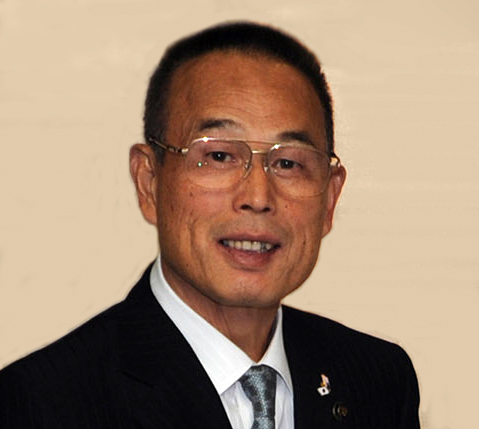

Mayor of Sagamihara
- In office 22 April 2007 – 22 April 2019
- Preceded by: Isao Ogawa
- Succeeded by: Kentaro Motomura

Personal details
- Born: 18 February 1945 (age 81) Wakō, Saitama, Japan
- Party: Independent
- Education: Tokyo Keizai University
- Website: Official website

Toshio Kayama (加山 俊夫, Kayama Toshio; born 18 February 1945) is a Japanese politician and the former mayor of Sagamihara a designated city in Kanagawa Prefecture, Japan. He was first elected in 2007. He was reelected in 2011 and 2015 but lost his bid for a fourth term in 2019 to Kentaro Motomura.
