= Issei Nishikawa =

Japanese politician (born 1945)

- 西川 一誠
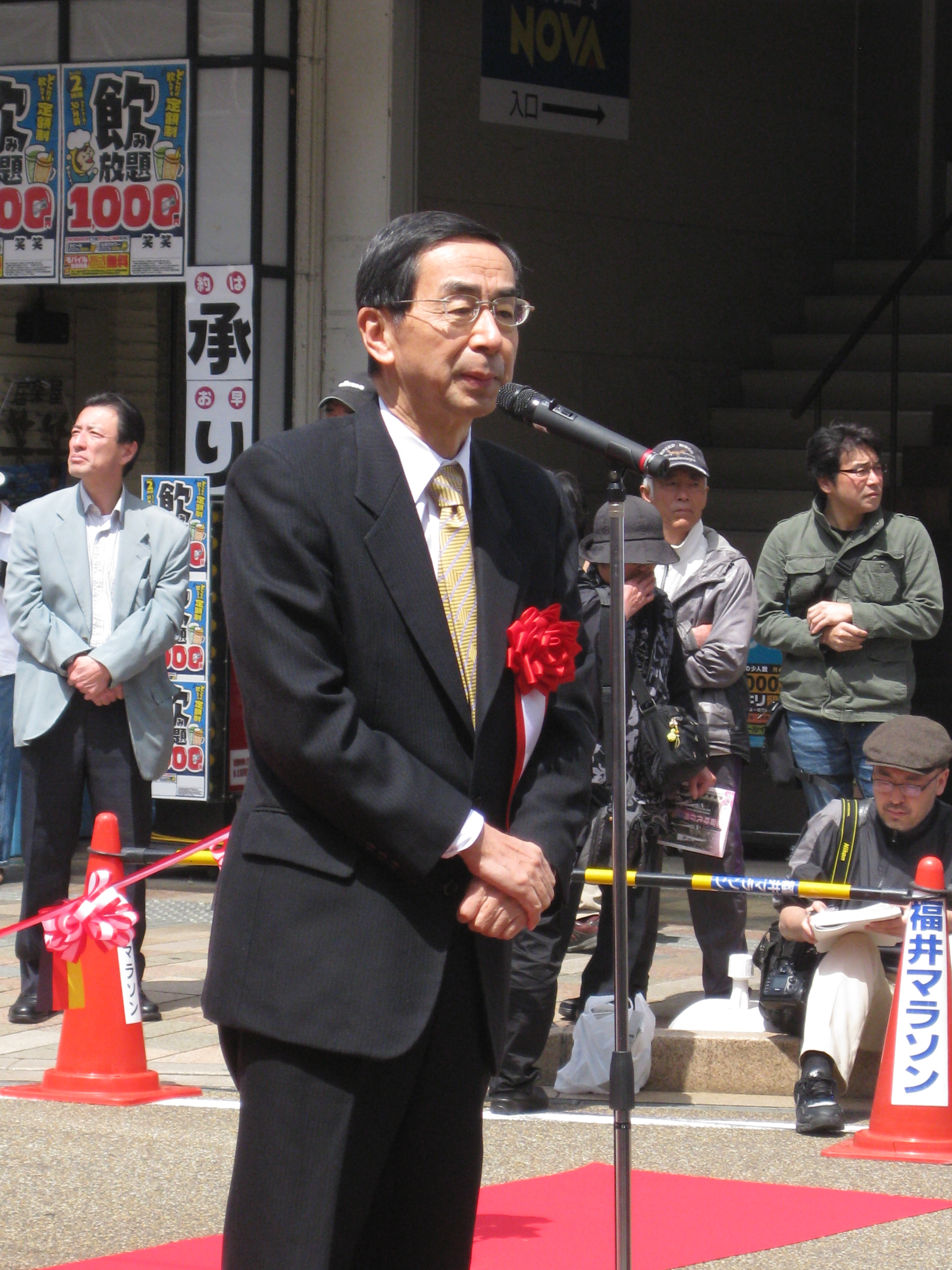

Governor of Fukui Prefecture
- In office 23 April 2003 – 22 April 2019
- Monarch: Akihito
- Preceded by: Yukio Kurita
- Succeeded by: Tatsuji Sugimoto

Personal details
- Born: 2 January 1945 (age 81) Asahi, Fukui, Japan
- Party: Independent
- Education: Kyoto University

Issei Nishikawa (西川 一誠, Nishikawa Issei; born 2 January 1945) is a Japanese politician and a former governor of Fukui Prefecture in Japan. He was elected first in 2003. A native of Asahi, Fukui and graduate of Kyoto University with an LL.B. degree in 1968, he joined the Ministry of Home Affairs in 1968.
