= Katsusada Hirose =

Japanese politician

- 広瀬 勝貞

Governor of Ōita Prefecture
- In office 28 April 2003 – 27 April 2023
- Monarchs: Akihito; Naruhito
- Preceded by: Morihiko Hiramatsu
- Succeeded by: Kiichiro Satō

Personal details
- Born: 25 June 1942 (age 84) Hita, Ōita, Japan
- Party: Independent
- Children: Ken Hirose
- Relatives: Yoshiro Hayashi (brother-in-law)
- Education: University of Tokyo

Katsusada Hirose (広瀬 勝貞, Hirose Katsusada; born 25 June 1942) is a former governor of Ōita Prefecture in Japan, first elected in 2003. A native of Hita, Ōita and graduate of the University of Tokyo, he had worked at the Ministry of International Trade and Industry since 1966 before elected governor.

In March 2024, he was appointed Honorary Member of the Order of the British Empire (MBE), for services to UK-Japan Relations.
