= Tatsuya Maruyama =

Japanese politician

- 丸山 達也
- Maruyama in 2025

Governor of Shimane Prefecture
- Incumbent
- Assumed office 30 April 2019
- Monarchs: Akihito; Naruhito
- Preceded by: Zenbee Mizoguchi

Personal details
- Born: 25 March 1970 (age 56) Hirokawa, Fukuoka, Japan
- Party: Independent
- Website: 島根県: ようこそ知事室へ

Tatsuya Maruyama (丸山 達也, Maruyama Tatsuya; born 25 March 1970) is a Japanese politician and current governor of Shimane Prefecture.

== Political career ==
He ran for office as an independent during the Shimane gubernatorial election in 2019, winning 43.58% of the vote.

In February 2020, he criticized South Korea over territorial disputes in the Liancourt Rocks, which Japan claims is as a part of Shimane Prefecture. Maruyama said the ROK government is “strengthening movements to make the occupation of Takeshima (Liancourt Rocks) an established fact”. He also called on the central Japanese government to give an effective response regarding the Liancourt Rocks dispute.
