= Zenbee Mizoguchi =

Japanese politician (1946–2024)

- 溝口 善兵衛
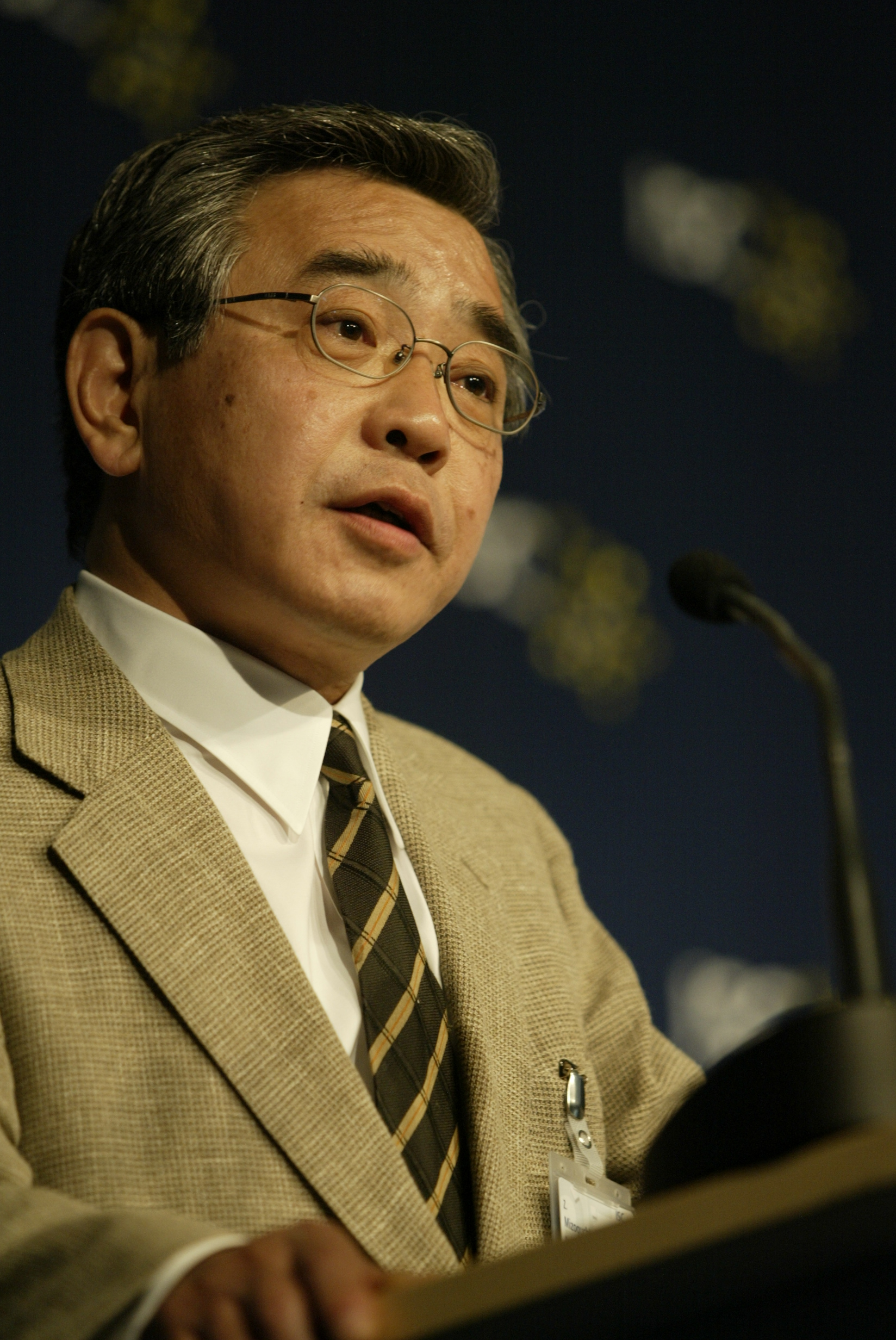
- Mizoguchi in 2005

Governor of Shimane Prefecture
- In office 30 April 2007 – 30 April 2019
- Monarch: Akihito
- Preceded by: Nobuyoshi Sumita
- Succeeded by: Tatsuya Maruyama

Personal details
- Born: 20 January 1946 Masuda, Shimane, Japan
- Died: 20 August 2024 (aged 78) Tokyo, Japan
- Party: Independent
- Education: University of Tokyo

Zenbee Mizoguchi (溝口 善兵衛, Mizoguchi Zenbee; 20 January 1946 – 20 August 2024) was a Japanese politician and governor of Shimane Prefecture in Japan, elected from 2007 to 2019. He graduated from the University of Tokyo and was a former official of the Ministry of Finance. Mizoguchi died on 20 August 2024, at the age of 78.

== Sources ==
- 政治家情報 〜溝口 善兵衛〜 (in Japanese). JANJAN.
