= Yūji Kuroiwa =

Japanese politician

- 黒岩 祐治
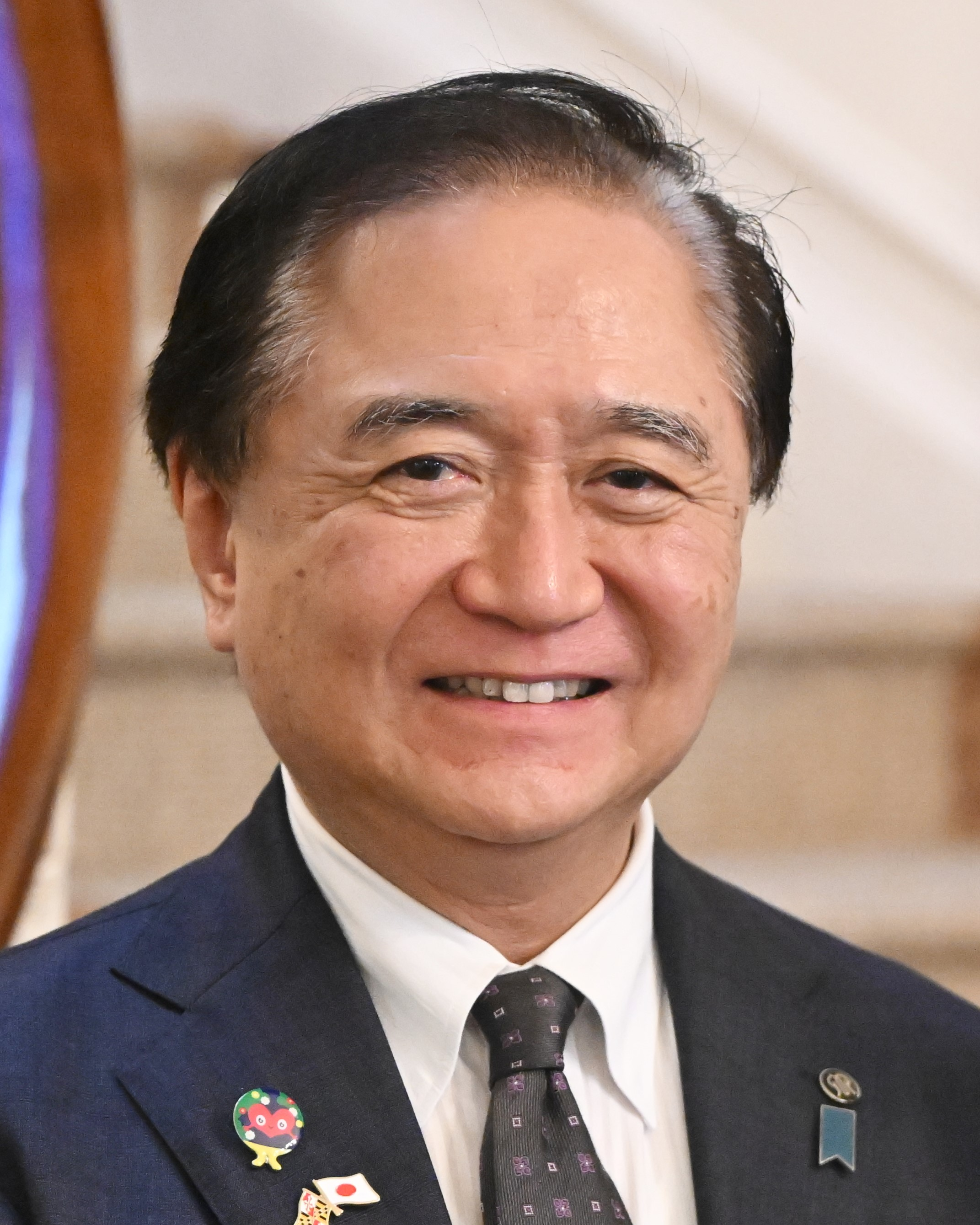
- Kuroiwa in 2026

Governor of Kanagawa Prefecture
- Incumbent
- Assumed office 23 April 2011
- Monarchs: Akihito; Naruhito
- Preceded by: Shigefumi Matsuzawa

Personal details
- Born: 26 September 1954 (age 72) Kobe, Hyōgo, Japan
- Party: Independent
- Education: Waseda University

Yūji Kuroiwa (黒岩 祐治, Kuroiwa Yūji; born 26 September 1954) is a Japanese politician and the governor of Kanagawa Prefecture located in Kantō region of Japan.

== Biography ==
Kuroiwa was born on 26 September 1954 in Kobe, the capital city of Hyōgo Prefecture in Kansai region of Japan. A graduate of Waseda University, Kuroiwa became the governor of Kanagawa Prefecture on 23 April 2011, and has held the position for more than 10 years. Aside from Japanese, he could also speak Vietnamese.
