= Shinji Hirai =

Japanese politician

- 平井 伸治
- Hirai in 2024

Governor of Tottori Prefecture
- Incumbent
- Assumed office 13 April 2007
- Monarchs: Akihito; Naruhito
- Preceded by: Yoshihiro Katayama

Personal details
- Born: 17 September 1961 (age 65) Chiyoda, Tokyo, Japan
- Party: Independent
- Education: University of Tokyo

Shinji Hirai (平井 伸治, Hirai Shinji; born 17 September 1961) is a Japanese politician, the governor of Tottori Prefecture in Japan, first elected in 2007. He graduated from the University of Tokyo with the B.L. degree in 1984 and joined the Ministry of Home Affairs upon graduation.
