= 2007 Japanese unified local elections =

The 16th unified local elections in Japan took place in April 2007. In the first phase on April 8, 13 governors, 44 prefectural assemblies as well as four mayors and 15 assemblies in cities designated by government ordinance were elected. In the second phase on April 22, mayors and/or assemblies in hundreds of cities, special wards, towns and villages were up for election. Additionally, by-elections for the National Diet were held in Fukushima and Okinawa on April 22.

== Elections on April 8 ==
- Gubernatorial elections in
  - Hokkaidō: Governor Harumi Takahashi is reelected for a second term with centre-right support against centre-left candidate Satoshi Arai and a JCP candidate.
  - Iwate: In Ichirō Ozawa's home prefecture, Democrat Takuya Tasso beats four candidates in the race to succeed retiring three-term governor Hiroya Masuda.
  - Tokyo: Former Liberal Democratic environment minister and incumbent governor Shintarō Ishihara wins a third term.
  - Kanagawa: Governor Shigefumi Matsuzawa (former Democratic Diet member) is reelected.
  - Fukui: With broad support from non-Communist parties, governor Issei Nishikawa wins a second term.
  - Mie: With broad support from non-Communist parties, governor Akihiko Noro wins a second term.
  - Nara: Supported by the centre-right parties, but with only one other Communist candidate, Shōgo Arai is elected to succeed retiring incumbent Yoshiya Kakimoto
  - Tottori: Centre-right supported former vice governor Shinji Hirai wins the election against only one Communist challenger and succeeds retiring Yoshihiro Katayama.
  - Shimane: With centre-right support Zenbē Mizoguchi beats his only rival candidate, a Communist, to follow retiring Nobuyoshi Sumita as governor.
  - Tokushima: Governor Kamon Iizumi wins reelection against only one Communist candidate.
  - Fukuoka: Three-term incumbent Wataru Asō beats centre-left supported Shūji Inatomi and a Communist.
  - Saga: Governor Yasushi Furukawa defeats his Communist challenger to win a second term.
  - Ōita: Incumbent Katsusada Hirose wins reelection against only one Communist candidate.
- Assembly elections in all prefectures with the exceptions of Ibaraki, Tokyo and Okinawa. In the national aggregate, the Liberal Democratic Party receives 38.4% of the vote, winning 1212 of the 2544 seats. The Democratic Party increases its nationwide vote share to 16.4% and now has 375 prefectural assembly members; in Iwate, it becomes strongest party in a prefectural assembly for the first time. The number of women elected reaches a new record high at 190 of 2544.
- Mayoral elections in
  - Sapporo, Hokkaidō: Centre-left-supported Fumio Ueda is reelected for a second term.
  - Shizuoka, Shizuoka: Zenkichi Kojima (two terms in office since the elevation to designated city, but before that mayor of the pre-merger Shizuoka since 1994) is reelected
  - Hamamatsu, Shizuoka: Former Democratic Diet member Yasutomo Suzuki beats incumbent mayor Yasuyuki Kitawaki (also a former Democrat) by a margin of twelve thousand votes.
  - Hiroshima, Hiroshima: Mayor Tadatoshi Akiba beats former Liberal Democratic Diet member Takeaki Kashimura and two other candidates to win a third term in office.
- Assembly elections in all designated cities except for Shizuoka and Kitakyūshū. In Kawasaki and Nagoya, the Democratic Party wins a plurality of seats, in Sakai the Kōmeitō, in all other cities the LDP is strongest party, though "independents" often form the majority.

== Elections on April 22 ==
- By-elections for the national Diet: House of Councillors, Fukushima and Okinawa
- Mayoral elections in 96 cities, 13 special wards and many towns and villages
- Assembly elections in hundreds of municipalities, including 21 special wards

Elections with national media coverage included the mayoral races in five prefectural capitals (Mito, Ibaraki; Takamatsu, Kagawa; Matsuyama, Ehima; Nagasaki, Nagasaki: Tomihisa Taue won the election to succeed assassinated mayor Itchō Itō; Ōita, Ōita), in the bankrupt city of Yūbari, Hokkaidō, and in Tōyō, Kōchi where an opponent of a planned site for highly radioactive waste won the election.

The House of Councillors by-elections were won by one LDP-Kōmeitō supported candidate (Aiko Shimajiri in Okinawa) as replacement for OSMP Councillor Keiko Itokazu, and one Democrat (Teruhiko Mashiko in Fukushima) as replacement for Democrat Yūhei Satō, producing a net gain of one seat for the ruling centre-right coalition three months before the regular House of Councillors election of 2007.
