= 2003 Hokkaido gubernatorial election =

Election for Governor of Hokkaido

| ← 1999 | 13 April 2003 | 2007 → |
- Turnout: 61.81%
| Nominee | Harumi Takahashi | Yoshio Hachiro |
| Party | Independent | Independent |
| Popular vote | 798,317 | 736,231 |
Governor before election
Tatsuya Hori
Independent
Elected Governor
Harumi Takahashi
Independent

A gubernatorial election was held on 13 April 2003 to elect the Governor of Hokkaido Prefecture.

== Candidates ==
- Harumi Takahashi – former director of Hokkaido Bureau of Economy, Trade and Industry, age 49.
- Yoshio Hachiro – member of the House of Representatives, age 55.
- Ken'ichi Isoda – former vice-governor of Hokkaido, age 58.
- Hideko Itō – lawyer and former representative, age 59.
- Yoshihide Sakai (酒井芳秀, Sakai Yoshihide) – president of the Hokkaido Prefectural Assembly and later mayor of Shinhidaka, Hokkaido, age 58.
- Shunroku Wakayama (若山俊六, Wakayama Shunroku) – chairman of the Hokkaido Teachers Association, age 64.
- Norimasa Ueno (上野憲正, Ueno Norimasa) – ex-director of the Hokkaido Finance Bureau, age 58.
- Tokuo Yamada (山田得生, Yamada Tokuo) – unemployed and later 2009 town council candidate at Yūbetsu, Hokkaido, age 44.
- Toshio Tsuzuki – agronomist and 1991 Hokkaido gubernatorial election candidate, age 72.

== Results ==
2003 Hokkaido gubernatorial election
| Party | Candidate | Votes | % | ±% |
|---|---|---|---|---|
| Independent | Harumi Takahashi | 798,317 | | |
| Independent | Yoshio Hachiro | 736,231 | | |
| Independent | Ken'ichi Isoda | 428,548 | | |
| Independent | Hideko Itō | 371,126 | | |
| Independent | Yoshihide Sakai | 167,615 | | |
| Independent | Shunroku Wakayama | 142,079 | | |
| Independent | Norimasa Ueno | 32,119 | | |
| Independent | Tokuo Yamada | 28,190 | | |
| Independent | Toshio Tsuzuki | 21,521 | | |
| Turnout | | 2,804,910 | 61.81 | |
