= 2007 Kanagawa gubernatorial election =

Kanagawa gubernatorial election

| ← 2003 | 8 April 2007 | 2011 → |
- Turnout: 47.04 ▼1.40
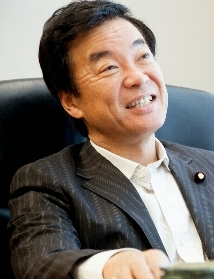

| Nominee | Shigefumi Matsuzawa | Tadashi Sugino | Yoko Kamoi |
| Party | Independent | Independent | Independent |
| Popular vote | 2,008,340 | 627,607 | 561,906 |
| Percentage | 62.80% | 19.63% | 17.57% |
Governor before election
Shigefumi Matsuzawa
Independent
Elected Governor
Shigefumi Matsuzawa
Independent

The 2007 Kanagawa gubernatorial election was held on 8 April 2007 in order to elect the Governor of Kanagawa. Incumbent Independent Governor Shigefumi Matsuzawa won re-election against Independent candidates Tadashi Sugino and Yoko Kamoi.

== General election ==
On election day, 8 April 2007, incumbent Independent Governor Shigefumi Matsuzawa won re-election by a margin of 1,189,513 votes against his foremost opponent Independent candidate Tadashi Sugino, thereby retaining Independent control over the office of Governor. Matsuzawa was sworn in for his second term on 23 April 2007.

=== Results ===
Kanagawa gubernatorial election, 2007
| Party | Candidate | Votes | % |
|---|---|---|---|
| Independent | Shigefumi Matsuzawa (incumbent) | 2,008,340 | 62.80 |
| Independent | Tadashi Sugino | 627,607 | 19.63 |
| Independent | Yoko Kamoi | 561,906 | 17.57 |
| Total votes | | 3,197,853 | 100.00 |
| Independent hold | | | |
