= 2011 Hokkaido gubernatorial election =

Election for Governor of Hokkaido

← 2007	10 April 2011	2015 →
- Turnout: 59.46%
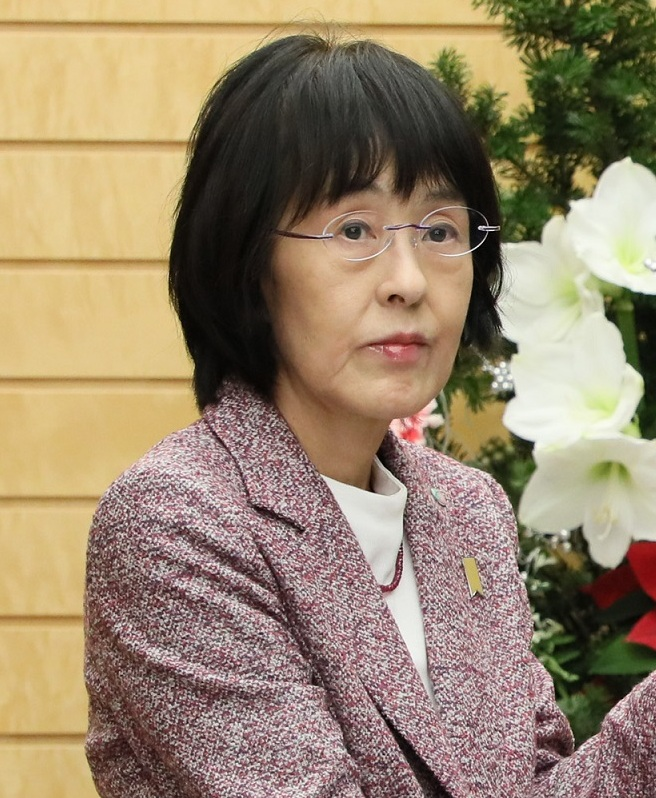

Nominee	Harumi Takahashi	Toshiaki Kimura	Satoshi Miyauchi
Party	Independent	Independent	Independent
Popular vote	1,848,504	544,319	176,544
Percentage	69.44%	20.45%	6.63%
Governor before election
Harumi Takahashi
Independent
Elected Governor
Harumi Takahashi
Independent

A gubernatorial election was held on 10 April 2011 to elect the Governor of Hokkaido Prefecture.

== Candidates ==
- Harumi Takahashi - incumbent governor of Hokkaido, age 57.
- Toshiaki Kimura - ex-civil servant, age 50.
- Satoshi Miyauchi (宮内聡, Miyauchi Satoshi) - candidate in the 2007 Hokkaido gubernatorial election, age 48
- Tadashi Katsuya (鰹谷忠, Katsuya Takashi) - former vice-chair of Hokkaido Prefectural Assembly, age 60.

== Results ==
2011 Hokkaido gubernatorial election
Party	Candidate	Votes	%	±%
Independent	Harumi Takahashi (incumbent)	1,848,504	69.44	
Independent	Toshiaki Kimura	544,319	20.45	
Independent	Satoshi Miyauchi	176,544	6.63	
Independent	Tadashi Katsuya	92,491	3.47	
Turnout		2,691,929	59.46	
