= Yoshio Nakagawa =

Japanese politician (born 1938)

- 中川 義雄
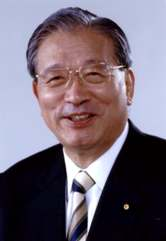
- Official portrait, 2004

Member of the House of Councillors
- In office 26 July 1998 – 25 July 2010
- Preceded by: Masaaki Takagi
- Succeeded by: Gaku Hasegawa
- Constituency: Hokkaido at-large

Speaker of the Hokkaido Legislative Assembly
- In office May 1995 – June 1997

Member of the Hokkaido Legislative Assembly
- In office 1979–1998
- Constituency: Tokachi Subprefecture

Personal details
- Born: 14 March 1938 (age 88) Hiroo, Hokkaido, Japan
- Party: Liberal Democratic
- Other political affiliations: Sunrise (2010–2012)
- Children: 2
- Relatives: Ichiro Nakagawa (brother); Shōichi Nakagawa (nephew)
- Education: Kanagawa University

Yoshio Nakagawa (中川 義雄, Nakagawa Yoshio; born 14 March 1938) is a Japanese politician of the Sunrise Party of Japan, and a previous member of the House of Councillors in the Diet (national legislature).

== Political career ==
A native of Hiroo District, Hokkaidō and dropout of Kanagawa University, he was elected to the House of Councillors as a candidate for the Liberal Democratic Party for the first time in 1998 after serving in the Hokkaido Prefectural Assembly for five terms.

He joined the Sunrise Party of Japan on 10 April 2010, but lost in House of Councillors election.

== Family ==
He is the younger brother of Ichirō Nakagawa.

House of Councillors
Preceded by Hisashi Kazama; Noriyuki Nakao; Naoki Minezaki; Masaaki Takagi	Councillor for Hokkaidō; 1998–2010; Served alongside: Naoki Minezaki	Succeeded by Gaku Hasegawa; Eri Tokunaga
Political offices
Preceded by Sotoji Sakurai	Speaker of the Hokkaido Prefectural Assembly; 1995–1997	Succeeded by Makoto Iwamoto
