= Norihiro Nakayama =

Japanese politician

- 中山 展宏
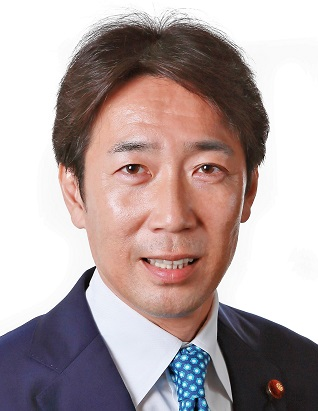
- Official portrait, 2019

Member of the House of Representatives
- Incumbent
- Assumed office 9 February 2026
- Preceded by: Ei Takahashi
- Constituency: Shikoku PR
- In office 17 December 2012 – 9 October 2024
- Constituency: Southern Kanto PR

Personal details
- Born: 16 September 1968 (age 58) Nishinomiya, Hyōgo, Japan
- Party: Liberal Democratic
- Education: Aoyama Gakuin University

Norihiro Nakayama (中山 展宏, Nakayama Norihiro; born 16 September 1968) is a Japanese politician of the Liberal Democratic Party, who serves as a member of the House of Representatives.

== Early years ==
Nakayama was born in Nishinomiya, Hyōgo Prefecture.

After graduating from the Aoyama Gakuin University College of Science and Engineering, Nakayama entered Graduate School of Finance, Accounting and Law, Waseda University but he dropped out.

After working as a bond dealer at Kankaku Securities, he served as a secretary to Yoichiro Esaki.

== Political career ==
In the 2009 general election, After Koichi Yamauchi, who had been slated to receive the LDP's nomination, left the party to join Your Party, Nakayama was selected as the LDP candidate for the Kanagawa 9th district through an open recruitment process. Nakayama lost to DPJ's Hirofumi Ryu by large margin.

In the 2012 general election, Nakayama lost to DPJ Incumbent Ryu and won a seat in the PR.

In the 2014 general election, Nakayama lost to Ryu (DPJ) after a close race and won a seat in the PR.

In the 2017 general election, Nakayama lost to Kibō’s Ryu after a close race and won a seat in the PR.

In September 2019, Nakayama was appointed to Parliamentary Vice-Minister for Foreign Affairs in Fourth Abe second reshuffled cabinet.

In October 2021, Nakayama was appointed to State Minister of Land, Infrastructure, Transport and Tourism in First Kishida cabinet.

In the 2021 general election, Nakayama lost to CDP’s Ryu and won a seat in the PR. After the election, he was re-appointed to State Minister of Land, Infrastructure, Transport and Tourism in Second Kishida cabinet.

In the 2024 general election, Nakayama lost to CDP's Ryu by large margin and lost re-election.

On 22 December 2024, the LDP Kanagawa Prefectural Federation decided not to reappoint Nakayama as the head of the LDP Kanagawa 9th branch (LDP's Kanagawa 9th candidate), citing his repeated electoral defeats.

In the 2026 general election, Nakayama ran as a candidate for Shikoku PR. Although he was placed low on the party list, he won a seat because of LDP's landslide victory.
