= Katsuya Ogawa =

Japanese politician (born 1963)

- 小川 勝也
- Official portrait, 2011

Member of the House of Councillors
- In office 23 July 1995 – 28 July 2019
- Preceded by: Multi-member district
- Succeeded by: Kenji Katsube
- Constituency: Hokkaido at-large

Personal details
- Born: 7 July 1963 (age 63) Wassamu, Hokkaido, Japan
- Party: Independent (since 2018)
- Other political affiliations: NFP (1995–1996); DP 1996 (1996–1998); DPJ (1998–2016); DP 2016 (2016–2018)
- Education: Nihon University

Katsuya Ogawa (小川 勝也, Ogawa Katsuya; born 7 July 1963) is a former Japanese politician of the Democratic Party of Japan, a member of the House of Councillors in the Diet (national legislature). A native of Kamikawa, Hokkaidō and graduate of Nihon University, he was elected to the House of Councillors for the first time in 1995 as a member of the New Frontier Party.

Senate
Preceded by Yasuko Takemura; Hisamitsu Sugano; Shūji Kita; Yūko Takasaki	Councillor for Hokkaido's At-large district 1995–present Served alongside: Chūichi Date	Incumbent
