= 1995 Hokkaido gubernatorial election =

Election in Japan

← 1991	9 April 1995	1999 →
- Turnout: 65.98%
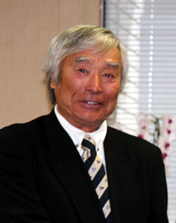
Nominee	Tatsuya Hori	Hideko Itō	Yūichirō Miura
Party	Independent	Independent	Independent
Popular vote	1,636,360	766,657	191,099
Nominee	Motoo Kai	Michio Misawa
Party	Independent	Independent
Popular vote	169,715	41,647
Governor before election
Takahiro Yokomichi
Independent
Elected Governor
Tatsuya Hori
Independent

A gubernatorial election was held on 9 April 1995 to elect the Governor of Hokkaido Prefecture.

== Candidates ==
- Tatsuya Hori - Vice-Governor of Hokkaido, age 59.
- Hideko Itō - member of the House of Representatives, age 51.
- Yūichirō Miura - skier and alpinist, age 62.
- Motoo Kai (甲斐基男, Kai Motoo), age 48.
- MIchio Misawa (三沢道男, Michio Misawa), age 59.

== Results ==
1995 Hokkaido gubernatorial election
Party	Candidate	Votes	%	±%
Independent	Tatsuya Hori	1,636,360		
Independent	Hideko Itō	766,657		
Independent	Yūichirō Miura	191,099		
Independent	Motoo Kai	169,715		
Independent	Michio Misawa	41,647		
Turnout		2,854,168	65.98	
