= Hokkaido at-large district =

Japan House of Councillors constituency

- 北海道選挙区
- Parliamentary constituency for the House of Councillors
- Prefecture: Hokkaido
- Electorate: 4,424,026 (as of September 2022)

Current constituency
- Created: 1947
- Seats: 6
- Councillors: Class of 2028: Gaku Hasegawa (LDP); Eri Tokunaga (CDP); Toshimitsu Funahashi (LDP); Class of 2031: Harumi Takahashi (LDP); Kenji Katsube (CDP); Tsuyohito Iwamoto (LDP)

The Hokkaido at-large district is a constituency of the House of Councillors in the Diet of Japan (national legislature). It consists of the prefecture (dō) of Hokkai[dō] and is represented by six Councillors electing three at a time every three years by single non-transferable vote for six-year terms. In the election period from 2025 to 2028, Hokkaido's Councillors are (party affiliation as of January 2026):

- Gaku Hasegawa (LDP; term ends in 2028),
- Eri Tokunaga (CDP; term ends in 2028),
- Toshimitsu Funahashi (LDP; term ends in 2028),
- Harumi Takahashi (LDP; term ends in 2031),
- Kenji Katsube (CDP; term ends in 2031) and
- Tsuyohito Iwamoto (LDP; term ends in 2031).

After the House of Councillors had replaced the House of Peers according to the constitution of 1947, Hokkaido was represented by eight Councillors. In the early years of the 1955 System, all four seats went to the two major postwar parties, the Liberal Democratic Party (LDP) and the Japan Socialist Party (JSP). But smaller parties such as the Japanese Communist Party (JCP) had a chance to pick up seats in Hokkaido as the vote share sufficient to gain a seat was often significantly below 20 percent. The high number of candidates increased the risk of vote splitting for the major parties: In 1974, two incumbent LDP candidates and conservative independent Tatsuo Takahashi ranked 5th, 6th and 7th leaving all four seats to the center-left to left opposition parties Kōmeitō, JSP and JCP.

In a major reapportionment in 1994 the number of Councillors from Hokkaido was halved to four. It became effective in the 1995 and 1998 elections. During the period as two-member district, Hokkaidō usually split seats evenly between opposition and ruling parties like most two-member districts – although the Democrats unsuccessfully aimed for both seats in the 2004, 2007 and 2010 elections. In another 2015 reapportionment, effective in the two classes from the 2016 and 2019 elections, Hokkaidō's representation in the upper house was raised to six.

== Elected Councillors ==
Class of 1947				Election year	Class of 1950			
#1 (1947: #1, 6-year term) (1950: #5, 3-year term)	#2 (1947: #2, 6-year term)	#3 (1947: #3, 6-year term)	#4 (1947: #4, 6-year term)	Election year	#1 (1947: #5, 3-year term)	#2 (1947: #6, 3-year term)	#3 (1947: #7, 3-year term)	#4 (1947: #8, 3-year term)
Junsuke Itaya † (JLP)	Sueji Hori (Indep.)	Makoto Chiba (JSP)	Misao Kaga (Indep.) (Note: joined Ryokufūkai)	1947	Katsuzō Wakaki (Indep.) (Note: joined JSP)	Gengo Kinoshita (JSP)	Keiki Machimura (Indep.) (Note: joined Ryokufūkai)	Yonesaburō Kobayashi (Indep.) (Note: joined JLP)
Eiji Arima (DP)	Sueji Hori (Indep.)	Makoto Chiba (JSP)	Misao Kaga (Indep.)	1950 incl. by-election	Gengo Kinoshita (JSP)	Takashi Azuma (Farmers Cooperative Party)	Katsuzō Wakaki (JSP)	Sadayoshi Matsuura (Farmers Cooperative Party)
Makoto Chiba (JSP, left)	Katsutarō Kita (Indep.) (Note: joined Ryokufūkai)	Sueji Hori (Yoshida LP)	Eiji Arima (Progressive)	1953	Gengo Kinoshita (JSP)	Takashi Azuma (Farmers Cooperative Party)	Katsuzō Wakaki (JSP)	Sadayoshi Matsuura (Farmers Cooperative Party)
Makoto Chiba (JSP, left)	Katsutarō Kita (Indep.)	Sueji Hori (Yoshida LP)	Eiji Arima (Progressive)	1956	Hidetoshi Tomabechi (LDP)	Tadashi Ōya (JSP)	Takashi Azuma (JSP)	Shinichi Nishida (LDP)
Isao Yoneta (JSP)	Sueji Hori (LDP)	Ihei Ikawa (LDP)	Makoto Chiba (JSP)	1959	Hidetoshi Tomabechi (LDP)	Tadashi Ōya (JSP)	Takashi Azuma (JSP)	Shinichi Nishida (LDP)
Isao Yoneta (JSP)	Sueji Hori (LDP)	Ihei Ikawa (LDP)	Makoto Chiba (JSP)	1962	Tadashi Ōya (JSP)	Tokuichi Kobayashi (Indep.) (Note: joined LDP)	Chūzaburō Yoshida (JSP)	Shinichi Nishida (LDP)
Seiichi Kawamura (JSP)	Ihei Ikawa (LDP)	Yūnosuke Takahashi (LDP)	Genshō Takeda (JSP)	1965	Tadashi Ōya (JSP)	Tokuichi Kobayashi (Indep.)	Chūzaburō Yoshida (JSP)	Shinichi Nishida (LDP)
Seiichi Kawamura (JSP)	Ihei Ikawa (LDP)	Yūnosuke Takahashi (LDP)	Genshō Takeda (JSP)	1968	Tadashi Ōya (JSP)	Yōichi Kawaguchi (LDP)	Shinichi Nishida (LDP)	Chūzaburō Yoshida (JSP)
Yūnosuke Takahashi (LDP)	Seiichi Kawamura (JSP)	Genshō Takeda (JSP)	Masaichi Iwamoto (LDP)	1971	Tadashi Ōya (JSP)	Yōichi Kawaguchi (LDP)	Shinichi Nishida (LDP)	Chūzaburō Yoshida (JSP)
Yūnosuke Takahashi (LDP)	Seiichi Kawamura (JSP)	Genshō Takeda (JSP)	Masaichi Iwamoto (LDP)	1974	Sadako Ogasawara (JCP)	Chūzaburō Yoshida (JSP)	Takakatsu Tsushima (JSP)	Takehiko Aizawa (Kōmeitō)
Shūji Kita (LDP)	Keiichi Nakamura (LDP)	Kaneyasu Marutani (JSP)	Seiichi Kawamura (JSP)	1977	Sadako Ogasawara (JCP)	Chūzaburō Yoshida (JSP)	Takakatsu Tsushima (JSP)	Takehiko Aizawa (Kōmeitō)
Shūji Kita (LDP)	Keiichi Nakamura (LDP)	Kaneyasu Marutani (JSP)	Seiichi Kawamura (JSP)	1980	Masaaki Takagi (LDP)	Masamitsu Iwamoto (LDP)	Takakatsu Tsushima (JSP)	Sadako Ogasawara (JCP)
Shūji Kita (LDP)	Hisamitsu Sugano (JSP)	Kaneyasu Marutani (JSP)	Masami Kudō (LDP)	1983	Masaaki Takagi (LDP)	Masamitsu Iwamoto (LDP)	Takakatsu Tsushima (JSP)	Sadako Ogasawara (JCP)
Shūji Kita (LDP)	Hisamitsu Sugano (JSP)	Kaneyasu Marutani (JSP)	Masami Kudō (LDP)	1986	Takakatsu Tsushima (JSP)	Masamitsu Iwamoto (LDP)	Masaaki Takagi (LDP)	Sadako Ogasawara (JCP)
Yasuko Takemura (Indep.) (Note: JSP support)	Hisamitsu Sugano (JSP)	Shūji Kita (LDP)	Yūko Takasaki (JCP)	1989	Takakatsu Tsushima (JSP)	Masamitsu Iwamoto (LDP)	Masaaki Takagi (LDP)	Sadako Ogasawara (JCP)
Yasuko Takemura (Indep.)	Hisamitsu Sugano (JSP)	Shūji Kita (LDP)	Yūko Takasaki (JCP)	1992	Hisashi Kazama (Kōmeitō)	Noriyuki Nakao (Indep.) (Note: JSP support)	Naoki Minezaki (JSP)	Masaaki Takagi (LDP)
Hisamitsu Sugano (JSP)	Katsuya Ogawa (NFP)	–		1995	Hisashi Kazama (Kōmeitō)	Noriyuki Nakao (Indep.)	Naoki Minezaki (JSP)	Masaaki Takagi (LDP)
Hisamitsu Sugano (JSP)	Katsuya Ogawa (NFP)	–		1998	Naoki Minezaki (DPJ)	Yoshio Nakagawa (LDP)	–	
Chūichi Date (LDP)	Katsuya Ogawa (DPJ)	–		2001	Naoki Minezaki (DPJ)	Yoshio Nakagawa (LDP)	–	
Chūichi Date (LDP)	Katsuya Ogawa (DPJ)	–		2004	Yoshio Nakagawa (LDP)	Naoki Minezaki (DPJ)	–	
Katsuya Ogawa (DPJ)	Chūichi Date (LDP)	–		2007	Yoshio Nakagawa (LDP)	Naoki Minezaki (DPJ)	–	
Katsuya Ogawa (DPJ)	Chūichi Date (LDP)	–		2010	Gaku Hasegawa (LDP)	Eri Tokunaga (DPJ)	–	
Chūichi Date (LDP)	Katsuya Ogawa (DPJ)	–		2013	Gaku Hasegawa (LDP)	Eri Tokunaga (DPJ)	–	
Chūichi Date (LDP)	Katsuya Ogawa (DPJ)	–		2016	Gaku Hasegawa (LDP)	Eri Tokunaga (DP)	Yoshio Hachiro (DP)	–
Harumi Takahashi (LDP)	Kenji Katsube (CDP)	Tsuyohito Iwamoto (LDP)	–	2019	Gaku Hasegawa (LDP)	Eri Tokunaga (DP)	Yoshio Hachiro (DP)	–
Harumi Takahashi (LDP)	Kenji Katsube (CDP)	Tsuyohito Iwamoto (LDP)	–	2022	Gaku Hasegawa (LDP)	Eri Tokunaga (CDP)	Toshimitsu Funahashi (LDP)	–
Harumi Takahashi (LDP)	Kenji Katsube (CDP)	Tsuyohito Iwamoto (LDP)	–	2025	Gaku Hasegawa (LDP)	Eri Tokunaga (CDP)	Toshimitsu Funahashi (LDP)	–

== Recent election results ==
Notes:

- Decimals from anbunhyō ("fractional proportional votes" from ambiguous votes) omitted; note that the rounded whole numbers may still include fractions of numbers >2 of ambiguous votes and do not necessarily represent "whole" voters
- Change in vote is between each election not between last time candidate contested.

=== Elections in the 2020s ===
2025: Hokkaido at-large 3 seats
Party	Candidate	Votes	%	±%
LDP	Harumi Takahashi	546,118	21.51	▼12.85
CDP (Social Democratic)	Kenji Katsube	501,081	19.73	▼2.00
LDP (Komeito)	Tsuyohito Iwamoto	333,558	13.14	▼5.71
Sanseitō	Yoshito Tanaka	325,070	12.80	▲9.58
DPP	Masaki Suzuki	324,272	12.77	▲8.87
JCP	Shiori Miyauchi	147,880	5.82	▼1.16
Reiwa	Kazutaka Nomura Paterson	139,301	5.49	new
CPJ	Masaru Onodera	112,076	4.41	new
Ishin	Miwako Okada	56,253	2.22	new
Team Mirai	Muneyoshi Inahara	33,038	1.30	new
Anti-NHK	Tomoko Gotō	13,144	0.52	new
Japan Reform Party	Yasuji Takasugi	7,420	0.29	new
Turnout			59.69	▲5.71
Registered electors		4,364,914		
Party total seats		Won	Total	Change
Liberal Democratic		2	4	Steady
Constitutional Democratic		1	2	Steady
Total		3	6	N/A

2022: Hokkaido at-large 3 seats
Party	Candidate	Votes	%	±%
LDP (Komeito)	Gaku Hasegawa	595,033	25.45	▼8.91
CDP (Social Democratic)	Eri Tokunaga	455,057	19.47	▼2.26
LDP (Komeito)	Toshimitsu Funahashi	447,232	19.13	▲0.28
CDP (Reiwa)	Tomohiro Ishikawa	422,392	18.07	new
JCP	Kazuya Hatayama	163,252	6.98	▼4.05
DPP	Hidetake Usuki	91,127	3.90	▼5.53
Sanseitō	Kotaro Ohmura	75,299	3.22	new
Anti-NHK	Tadayuki Saito	23,039	0.99	
Anti-NHK	Yoshie Ishii	18,831	0.81	
Anti-NHK	Satoshi Hamada	18,760	0.80	
New Party Kunimori	Eiichi Sawada	16,006	0.68	new
Happiness Realization	Yoshinori Moriyama	11,625	0.50	Steady
Turnout			53.98	▲0.22
Registered electors		4,465,576		
Party total seats		Won	Total	Change
Liberal Democratic		2	4	▲1
Constitutional Democratic		1	2	▼1
Total		3	6	N/A

=== Elections in the 2010s ===
2019: Hokkaido at-large 3 seats
Party	Candidate	Votes	%	±%
LDP	Harumi Takahashi	828,220	34.36	▲8.89
CDP	Kenji Katsube	523,737	21.73	new
LDP	Tsuyohito Iwamoto	454,285	18.85	▼0.11
JCP	Kazuya Hatayama	265,862	11.03	▲1.62
DPP	Nami Haraya	227,174	9.43	new
Anti-NHK	Takahira Yamamoto	63,308	2.63	new
CES	Osamu Nakamura	23,785	0.99	▼0.15
Happiness Realization	Yoshinori Moriyama	13,724	0.57	▼0.26
Workers Party Aiming for Liberation of Labour	Seiji Iwase	10,108	0.42	new
Turnout			53.76	▼3.02
Registered electors		4,560,237		
Party total seats		Won	Total	Change
Liberal Democratic		2	4	▲1
Constitutional Democratic		1	3	Steady
Total		3	6	▲1

2016: Hokkaido at-large 3 seats
Party	Candidate	Votes	%	±%
LDP	Gaku Hasegawa	648,269	25.47	▼12.23
Democratic	Eri Tokunaga	559,996	22.00	▼2.36
Democratic	Yoshio Hachiro	491,129	19.29	new
LDP	Katsuhiro Kakiki	482,688	18.96	new
JCP	Tsuneto Mori	239,564	9.41	▼1.94
Japanese Kokoro	Kazuo Satō	34,092	1.34	new
Shiji Seitō Nashi	Osamu Nakamura	29,072	1.14	new
Independent	Yoshihiro Iida	26,686	1.05	new
Happiness Realization	Yoshinori Moriyama	21,006	0.83	▼0.14
Independent	Kan'yō Mizukoshi	12,944	0.51	new
Turnout			56.78	▲2.37
Registered electors		4,613,374		
Party total seats		Won	Total	Change
Democratic		2	3	▲1
LDP		1	2	Steady
Total		3	5	▲1

2013: Hokkaido at-large 2 seats
Party	Candidate	Votes	%	±%
LDP	Chūichi Date	903,693	37.70	▲3.43
Democratic	Katsuya Ogawa	583,995	24.36	▼1.24
NP-Daichi	Takahiro Asano	352,434	14.70	new
JCP	Tsuneto Mori	272,102	11.35	▲4.11
Your	Takanobu Azumi	261,802	10.92	▼0.25
Happiness Realization	Yoshinori Moriyama	23,194	0.97	▲0.17
Turnout			54.41	▼7.48
Registered electors		4,598,957		
Party total seats		Won	Total	Change
LDP		1	2	Steady
Democratic		1	2	Steady
Total		2	4	N/A

2010: Hokkaido at-large 2 seats
Party	Candidate	Votes	%	±%
LDP	Gaku Hasegawa	948,267	34.27	▲7.48
Democratic	Eri Tokunaga	708,523	25.60	▼10.43
Democratic	Masashi Fujikawa	567,167	20.49	new
Your	Ken'ichi Nakagawa	320,992	11.60	new
JCP	Kazuya Hatayama	200,231	7.24	Steady
Happiness Realization	Makoto Ōbayashi	22,166	0.80	new
Turnout		2,849,955	61.89	▼0.51
Registered electors		4,604,561		
Party total seats		Won	Total	Change
Liberal Democratic		1	2	Steady
Democratic		1	2	Steady
Total		2	4	N/A

=== Elections in the 2000s ===
2007: Hokkaido at-large 2 seats
Party	Candidate	Votes	%	±%
Democratic	Katsuya Ogawa	1,018,597	36.03	▲13.73
LDP	Chūichi Date	757,463	26.79	Steady
Independent (NP-Daichi)	Kaori Sahara	621,497	21.98	new
JCP	Kazuya Hatayama	206,463	7.30	▼1.85
Independent	Hideyoshi Hashiba	103,282	3.65	new
Social Democratic	Takao Asano	79,474	2.81	▼1.03
Independent	Masayuki Arakawa	22,154	0.78	new
Ishin Seito Shimpu	Nobuhito Sendai	18,234	0.64	Steady
Turnout		2,907,079	62.40	▲0.66
Registered electors		4,658,649		
Party total seats		Won	Total	Change
Democratic		1	2	Steady
Liberal Democratic		1	2	Steady
Total		2	4	N/A

2004: Hokkaido at-large 2 seats
Party	Candidate	Votes	%	±%
LDP	Yoshio Nakagawa	741,831	26.70	▼12.56
Democratic	Naoki Minezaki	618,277	22.25	▼4.99
Democratic	Masahito Nishikawa	552,993	19.90	new
Independent	Muneo Suzuki	485,382	17.47	new
JCP	Chiharu Oka	254,338	9.15	▼2.19
Social Democratic	Keiko Yamauchi	106,631	3.84	▼2.76
Ishin Seito Shimpu	Nobuhito Sendai	19,020	0.68	▲0.18
Turnout			61.74	▲3.27
Registered electors		4,639,372		
Party total seats		Won	Total	Change
Liberal Democratic		1	2	Steady
Democratic		1	2	Steady
Total		2	4	N/A

2001: Hokkaido at-large 2 seats
Party	Candidate	Votes	%	±%
LDP	Chūichi Date	985,274	39.26	▲11.18
Democratic	Katsuya Ogawa	683,704	27.24	▼3.98
JCP	Satoshi Miyauchi	284,575	11.34	▼12.14
Liberal	Masahito Nishikawa	196,348	7.82	▲1.55
Social Democratic	Yoshiko Sugiyama	165,670	6.60	▲0.93
Women's Party	Tamiko Matsumura	87,597	3.49	new
Independent	Mitsuhiro Yokoyama	36,119	1.44	new
Liberal League	Akifumi Kumagai	33,500	1.33	▲0.07
New Socialist	Nobuyuki Saitō	25,261	1.01	new
Ishin Seito Shimpu	Nobuhito Sendai	11,469	0.46	▲0.18
Turnout			58.47	▼1.43
Registered electors		4,623,468		
Party total seats		Won	Total	Change
Liberal Democratic		1	2	▲1
Democratic		1	3	▲1
Socialist		0	0	▼1
New Frontier		0	0	▼1 (Note: NFP merged into the DPJ, with Katsuya Ogawa retaining the seat he won previously under NFP)
Total		2	4	N/A

=== Elections in the 1990s ===
1998: Hokkaido at-large 2 seats
Party	Candidate	Votes	%	±%
Democratic	Naoki Minezaki	804,611	31.22	new
LDP	Yoshio Nakagawa	723,786	28.08	▲3.85
JCP	Tomoko Uchiyama	605,119	23.48	▲4.01
Liberal	Kentarō Ono	161,505	6.27	new
Social Democratic (NP-Sakigake)	Shirō Kayano	146,159	5.67	new
New Socialist	Masami Mizuyoshi	34,374	1.33	new
Youth Liberal Party	Ken'ichi Sawada	33,390	1.30	new
Liberal League	Ryōko Matsukawa	32,557	1.26	new
Independent	Hideo Murata	28,480	1.11	new
Ishin Seito Shimpu	Nobuhito Sendai	7,249	0.28	new
Turnout			59.9	▲12.98
Registered electors		4,523,366		
Party total seats		Won	Total	Change
Democratic Party		1	3	new
Liberal Democratic		1	1	Steady
Kōmeitō		0	0	▼1
Independent		0	0	▼1
Total		2	4	▼2

1995: Hokkaido at-large 2 seats
Party	Candidate	Votes	%	±%
Socialist	Hisamitsu Sugano	563,029	27.91	▲10.94
New Frontier	Katsuya Ogawa	511,139	25.34	new
LDP	Yoshitaka Kimoto	488,807	24.23	▲8.53
JCP	Yūko Takasaki	392,714	19.47	▲5.97
Atarashii Jidai o Tsukuru Tō	Etsuko Yoshino	40,106	1.99	new
Independent	Hiroshi Maeya	21,716	1.08	▲0.47
Turnout			46.92	
Registered electors		4,444,356		
Party total seats		Won	Total	Change
Socialist		1	2	▼1
Liberal Democratic		0	1	▼1
New Frontier		1	1	▲1
Independent		0	1	▼1
Communist		0	0	▼1
Kōmeitō		0	1	Steady
Total		2	6	▼2

1992: Hokkaido at-large 4 seats
Party	Candidate	Votes	%	±%
Kōmeitō	Hisashi Kazama	500,717	20.19	new
Independent (Socialist)	Noriyuki Nakao	424,818	17.13	new
Socialist	Naoki Minezaki	420,994	16.97	▼7.78
LDP	Masaaki Takagi	389,317	15.70	▼1.62
LDP	Masamitsu Iwamoto	381,089	15.36	▲0.83
JCP	Yasuyo Ikari	334,840	13.50	▼2.31
Independent	Hiroshi Maetani	15,166	0.61	▲0.06
Small Business and Life Party	Nobuyuki Mori	13,301	0.54	new
Party total seats		Won	Total	Change
Socialist		1	2	Steady
Liberal Democratic		1	2	▼1
Independent		1	2	▲1
Kōmeitō		1	1	▲1
Communist		0	1	▼1
Total		4	8	N/A

=== Elections in the 1980s ===
1989: Hokkaido at-large 4 seats
Party	Candidate	Votes	%	±%
Independent (Socialist)	Yasuko Takemura	727,015	25.37	new
Socialist	Hisamitsu Sugano	709,064	24.75	▲2.17
LDP	Shūji Kita	496,013	17.32	▼3.24
JCP	Yūko Takasaki	453,013	15.81	▼1.64
LDP	Masami Kudō	416,408	14.53	▼5.73
Greens	Emiko Yamashita	23,633	0.82	▼0.36
Independent	Toma Kazuma	17,818	0.62	new
Independent	Hiroshi Maetani	15,685	0.55	new
Japan Youth Association	Hidetoshi Yashima	6,383	0.22	new
Turnout			70.90	▼3.14
Party total seats		Won	Total	Change
Liberal Democratic		1	3	▼1
Socialist		1	2	▼1
Communist		1	2	▲1
Independent		1	1	▲1
Total		4	8	N/A

1986: Hokkaido at-large 4 seats
Party	Candidate	Votes	%	±%
Socialist	Takakatsu Tsushima	640,834	22.58	▲2.49
LDP	Masamitsu Iwatomo	583,457	20.56	▼7.37
LDP	Masaaki Takagi	575,105	20.26	▲3.50
JCP	Sadako Ogasawara	495,254	17.45	▲6.30
Independent (Socialist)	Hiroshi Tsuchida	462,999	16.31	new
Greens	Fusako Nogami	33,504	1.18	new
Socialist Workers' Party	Junji Gōda	24,539	0.86	new
Independent	Rihei Tōbe	22,277	0.78	new
Turnout			74.04	▲16.92
Registered electors		4,071,178		
Party total seats		Won	Total	Change
Liberal Democratic		2	4	Steady
Socialist		1	3	Steady
Communist		1	1	Steady
Total		4	8	N/A

1983: Hokkaido at-large 4 seats
Party	Candidate	Votes	%	±%
LDP	Shūji Kita	612,390	27.93	▲7.18
Socialist	Hisamitsu Sugano	396,159	18.07	▲2.84
Socialist	Kaneyasu Marutani	383,704	17.50	▲3.10
LDP	Masami Kudō	367,392	16.76	▼2.66
JCP	Kenji Kodama	244,370	11.15	▼4.05
Democratic Socialist	Yoshida Kogi	156,582	7.14	new
Independent	Hiroshi Maetani	31,918	1.46	new
Turnout			57.12	▼19.16
Registered electors		3,977,673		
Party total seats		Won	Total	Change
Liberal Democratic		2	4	Steady
Socialist		2	3	Steady
Communist		0	1	Steady
Total		4	8	N/A

1980: Hokkaido at-large 4 seats
Party	Candidate	Votes	%	±%
LDP	Masaaki Takagi	588,100	20.75	▲0.46
LDP	Masamitsu Iwatomo	550,531	19.42	▲1.08
Socialist	Takakatsu Tsushima	431,770	15.23	▼0.59
JCP	Sadako Ogasawara	431,006	15.20	▲9.66
Socialist	Sakashita Tadashi	408,241	14.40	▲2.31
Kōmeitō	Takehito Aizawa	405,964	14.32	▲2.23
Marxist Youth Workers Alliance	Taku Sakaki	19,157	0.68	new
Turnout			76.28	▲2.61
Registered electors		3,846,154		
Party total seats		Won	Total	Change
Liberal Democratic		2	4	▲2
Socialist		1	3	▼1
Communist		1	1	Steady
Kōmeitō		0	0	▼1
Total		4	8	N/A

=== Elections in the 1970s ===
1977: Hokkaido at-large 4 seats
Party	Candidate	Votes	%	±%
LDP	Shūji Kita	544,725	20.29	▲6.45
LDP	Keiichi Nakamura	492,365	18.34	▲4.74
Socialist	Kaneyasu Marutani	424,686	15.82	▲0.24
Socialist	Seiichi Kawamura	346,111	12.89	▼2.36
Kōmeitō	Yoshio Koito	324,520	12.09	▼2.07
New Liberal Club	Yoshinori Bandō	314,726	11.72	new
JCP	Kenji Kodama	229,416	8.54	▼7.19
Independent	Hiromitsu Asanuma	4,663	0.17	new
Independent	Masahiro Azuma	3,627	0.14	new
Turnout			73.67	▼2.19
Registered electors		3,710,790		

1974: Hokkaido at-large 4 seats
Party	Candidate	Votes	%	±%
JCP	Sadako Ogasawara	416,950	15.73	▲4.34
Socialist	Chūsaburō Yoshida	412,746	15.58	▼3.74
Socialist	Takakatsu Tsushima	404,136	15.25	▼2.39
Kōmeitō	Takehiko Aizawa	375,278	14.16	new
LDP	Youichi Kawaguchi	366,788	13.84	▼6.31
LDP	Shinichi Nishida	360,438	13.60	▼1.71
Independent	Tatsuo Takahashi (Note: endorsed by Seirankai, a faction of the LDP, following internal disagreements over the nomination of the two incumbents)	313,521	11.83	new
Turnout			75.86	▲16.13
Registered electors		3,556,162		

1971: Hokkaido at-large 4 seats
Party	Candidate	Votes	%	±%
LDP	Yūnosuke Takahashi	394,931	20.15	▼1.11
Socialist	Seiichi Kawamura	378,619	19.32	▼2.96
Socialist	Genshō Takeda	345,769	17.64	▼0.96
LDP	Masaichi Iwamoto	300,055	15.31	▼5.78
LDP	Ihei Ikawa	256,694	13.10	new
JCP	Hisaya Igarashi	223,271	11.39	▲5.05
Independent	Kunio Fujimoto	60,359	3.08	▲1.08
Turnout			59.73	▼6.63
Registered electors		3,425,367		
