= Gaku Hasegawa =

Japanese politician

- 長谷川 岳
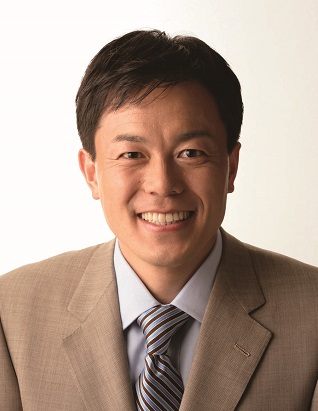

Member of the House of Councillors
- Incumbent
- Assumed office 26 July 2010
- Preceded by: Yoshio Nakagawa
- Constituency: Hokkaido at-large

Personal details
- Born: 16 February 1971 (age 55) Kasugai, Aichi, Japan
- Party: Liberal Democratic
- Education: Hokkaido University

Gaku Hasegawa (長谷川 岳, Hasegawa Gaku; born 16 February 1971) is a member of the House of Councillors of Japan from Hokkaido. He belongs to the Liberal Democratic Party (LDP).

== Career ==
In 1990, Hasegawa enrolled at Hokkaido University and majored in Business Administration. While attending university, he, with five other friends, brought the Soran Festival to Hokkaido, which is now run by the Yasakoi Soran Festival Foundation. The Soran Festival incorporates the traditional Sōran Bushi song and dance. In 1998 he was elected Director of the Yasakoi Soran Foundation. He has received the Japan Event New Theme Prize, the Suntory Area Culture Prize, and the Japanese Lifestyle and Culture Prize, for his founding of the Yasakoi Soran Bushi Festival that has come to represent the city of Sapporo.

In 2008, Hasegawa ran against Takahiro Yokomichi of the Democratic Party of Japan for representative of the first district of Hokkaido. He came in second place with a total of 124,343 votes. He was elected to the House of Councillors in July 2010.

House of Councillors
Preceded by Yoshio Nakagawa; Naoki Minezaki	Councillor for Hokkaidō; 2010- Served alongside: Eri Tokunaga	Succeeded by
Political offices
