= 1999 Hokkaido gubernatorial election =

Election for Governor of Hokkaido

← 1995	11 April 1999	2003 →
- Turnout: 63.73%
Nominee	Tatsuya Hori	Hideko Itō	Seiichi Satō
Party	Independent	Independent	Independent
Popular vote	1,593,251	810,187	374,931
Governor before election
Tatsuya Hori
Independent
Elected Governor
Tatsuya Hori
Independent

A gubernatorial election was held on 11 April 1999 to elect the Governor of Hokkaido Prefecture.

== Candidates ==
- Tatsuya Hori - incumbent governor of Hokkaido, age 63.
- Hideko Itō - member of the House of Representatives, age 55.
- Seiichi Satō (佐藤 誠一, Satō Seiichi) - Secretary General of the Hokkaido National Medical Association, age 50.

== Results ==
1999 Hokkaido gubernatorial election
Party	Candidate	Votes	%	±%
Independent	Tatsuya Hori *	1,593,251		
Independent	Hideko Itō	810,187		
Independent	Seiichi Satō	374,931		
Turnout		2,847,421	63.73	
