= Kaneyasu Marutani =

Japanese journalist and politician

- 丸谷 金保

Member of the House of Councillors
- In office 10 July 1977 – 9 July 1989
- Preceded by: Genshō Takeda
- Succeeded by: Yasuko Takemura
- Constituency: Hokkaido at-large

Mayor of Ikeda
- In office May 1957 – October 1976

Personal details
- Born: 丸谷金保 (Marutani Kaneyasu); 25 June 1919 Ikeda, Hokkaido, Japan
- Died: 3 June 2014 (aged 94) Ikeda, Hokkaido, Japan
- Party: Socialist
- Education: Meiji University
- Occupation: Journalist and politician

Kaneyasu Marutani (丸谷金保, Marutani Kaneyasu; 25 June 1919 – 3 June 2014) was a Japanese journalist and politician from the Social Democratic Party. He served as member of the House of Councillors from 1977 to 1989.

He also served as Mayor of Ikeda, Hokkaido from 1957 to 1976. During his tenure as mayor, he was instrumental in forming a sister city relationship with the City of Penticton in British Columbia Canada. This relationship is still active in 2017 and a delegation from Penticton recently travelled to Ikeda Japan to celebrate the fortieth anniversary.
