= Tsuyohito Iwamoto =

Japanese politician

- 岩本 剛人
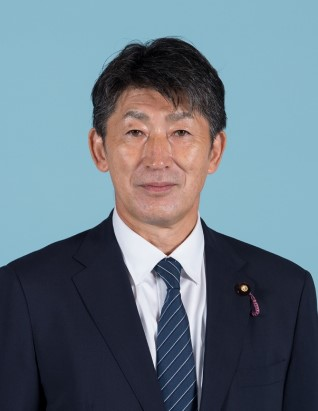
- Official portrait, 2021

Member of the House of Councillors
- Incumbent
- Assumed office 29 July 2019
- Preceded by: Seat established
- Constituency: Hokkaido at-large

Member of the Hokkaido Legislative Assembly
- In office 30 April 1999 – 29 April 2019
- Constituency: Kiyota Ward

Personal details
- Born: 19 October 1964 (age 61) Toyohira, Sapporo, Japan
- Party: Liberal Democratic
- Education: Shukutoku University

Tsuyohito Iwamoto (born October 19, 1964, in Hokkaido Prefecture, Japan) is a Japanese politician who has served as a member of the House of Councillors of Japan since 2019. He represents the Hokkaido at-large district and is a member of the Liberal Democratic Party.

He is a member of the following committees (as of 2021):

- Committee on Land and Transport
- Committee on Rules and Administration
- Special Committee on Okinawa and Northern Problems
- Special Committee on Political Ethics and Election System (Director)
