= 2011 Kanagawa gubernatorial election =

Kanagawa gubernatorial election

- 10 April 2011
- Turnout: 45.24 ▼1.80

Nominee	Yūji Kuroiwa	Junichi Tsuyuki	Hiroko Kamoi
Party	Independent	Independent	Independent
Popular vote	1,728,862	821,981	466,223
Percentage	55.47%	26.37%	14.96%
Governor before election
Shigefumi Matsuzawa
Independent
Elected Governor
Yūji Kuroiwa
Independent

The 2011 Kanagawa gubernatorial election was held on 10 April 2011 in order to elect the Governor of Kanagawa. Independent candidate Yūji Kuroiwa defeated Independent candidates Junichi Tsuyuki, Hiroko Kamoi and Osamu Teruya.

== General election ==
On election day, 10 April 2011, Independent candidate Yūji Kuroiwa won the election by a margin of 906,881 votes against his foremost opponent Independent candidate Junichi Tsuyuki, thereby retaining Independent control over the office of Governor. Kuroiwa was sworn in as Governor on 23 April 2011.

=== Results ===
Kanagawa gubernatorial election, 2011
Party	Candidate	Votes	%
Independent	Yūji Kuroiwa	1,728,862	55.47
Independent	Junichi Tsuyuki	821,981	26.37
Independent	Hiroko Kamoi	466,223	14.96
Independent	Osamu Teruya	99,751	3.20
Total votes		3,116,817	100.00
Independent hold			
