= 2007 Fukuoka gubernatorial election =

Election in Fukuoka Prefecture, Japan

Fukuoka Prefecture held a gubernatorial election on April 8, 2007, as part of the 16th unified local elections. Incumbent Asou Wataru won the election.

== Candidates ==
- Asou Wataru, the Independent incumbent governor.
- Inatomi Shouji, supported by the Democratic Party of Japan and the Social Democratic Party.
- Jirano Eiichi, former teacher supported by the Japanese Communist Party.

== Results ==
Gubernatorial election 2007: Fukuoka Prefecture
Party	Candidate	Votes	%	±%
independent	Asou Wataru	1,121,720		
DPJ, SDP	Inatomi Shouji	666,354		
JCP	Jirano Eiichi	156,228		
Turnout		1,976,901	49.04%	
