= 2003 Kanagawa gubernatorial election =

Kanagawa gubernatorial election

- 13 April 2003
- Turnout: 48.44
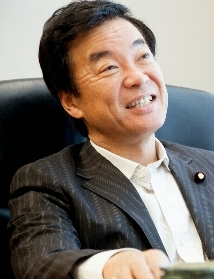

Nominee	Shigefumi Matsuzawa	Ryoichi Takarada	Ichiro Asukata
Party	Independent	Independent	Independent
Popular vote	1,040,594	676,534	643,583
Percentage	32.61%	21.20%	20.17%
Nominee	Yoko Tajima	Seiko Miyako
Party	Independent	Independent
Popular vote	496,319	197,402
Percentage	15.55%	6.19%
Governor before election
Hiroshi Okazaki
Independent
Elected Governor
Shigefumi Matsuzawa
Independent

The 2003 Kanagawa gubernatorial election was held on 13 April 2003 in order to elect the Governor of Kanagawa. Independent candidate and former member of the House of Representatives Shigefumi Matsuzawa defeated Independent candidates Hajime Okamoto, Ichiro Asukata, Yoko Tajima, Seiko Miyako, Setsuko Yamamoto and Kenjiro Endo.

== General election ==
On election day, 13 April 2003, Independent candidate Shigefumi Matsuzawa won the election by a margin of 364,060 votes against his foremost opponent Independent candidate Ryoichi Takarada, thereby retaining Independent control over the office of Governor. Matsuzawa was sworn in as Governor on 23 April 2003.

=== Results ===
Kanagawa gubernatorial election, 2003
Party	Candidate	Votes	%
Independent	Shigefumi Matsuzawa	1,040,594	32.61
Independent	Ryoichi Takarada	676,534	21.20
Independent	Ichiro Asukata	643,583	20.17
Independent	Yoko Tajima	496,319	15.55
Independent	Seiko Miyako	197,402	6.19
Independent	Setsuko Yamamoto	92,879	2.91
Independent	Kenjiro Endo	43,298	1.37
Total votes		3,190,609	100.00
Independent hold			
