= Kanagawa 9th district =

- Parliamentary constituency for the Japanese House of Representatives
- Numbered map of the Kanagawa Prefecture single seats
- Prefecture: Kanagawa
- Proportional District: Southern Kanto
- Electorate: 335,635

Current constituency
- Created: 1994
- Seats: One
- Party: CDP
- Representatives: Hirofumi Ryu
- Municipalities: Asao-ku and Tama-ku of Kawasaki

Kanagawa 9th district (神奈川県第9区, Kanagawa-ken dai-kyuku or simply 神奈川9区, Kanagawa-kyuku) is a single-member constituency of the House of Representatives in the national Diet of Japan located in Kanagawa Prefecture.

== Areas covered ==
=== Since 2022 ===
- Kawasaki
  - Asao-ku
  - Tama-ku

=== 2017 - 2022 ===
- Kawasaki
  - Asao-ku
  - Part of Miyamae-ku
  - Tama-ku

=== 2002 - 2017 ===
- Kawasaki
  - Asao-ku
  - Tama-ku

=== 1994 - 2002 ===
- Kawasaki
  - Asao-ku
  - Takatsu-ku
  - Tama-ku

== List of representatives ==
Election	Representative	Party	Notes
1996	Shigefumi Matsuzawa	New Frontier	Matsuzawa resigned on March 27, 2003, to run for Governor of Kanagawa Prefecture.
1996	Shigefumi Matsuzawa	Voice of the People	Matsuzawa resigned on March 27, 2003, to run for Governor of Kanagawa Prefecture.
1996	Shigefumi Matsuzawa	Good Governance	Matsuzawa resigned on March 27, 2003, to run for Governor of Kanagawa Prefecture.
2000	Shigefumi Matsuzawa	Democratic	Matsuzawa resigned on March 27, 2003, to run for Governor of Kanagawa Prefecture.
2003	Hirofumi Ryu	Democratic	
2005	Koichi Yamauchi	LDP	Yamauchi left the LDP.
2005	Koichi Yamauchi	Your	Yamauchi left the LDP.
2009	Hirofumi Ryu	Democratic	
2012	Hirofumi Ryu	Democratic	
2014	Hirofumi Ryu	Democratic	
2014	Hirofumi Ryu	Democratic	
2017	Hirofumi Ryu	Kibō no Tō	
2017	Hirofumi Ryu	Independent	
2021	Hirofumi Ryu	CDP	
2024	Hirofumi Ryu	CDP	
2026	Masahiro Uehara	LDP	

== Election results ==
=== 2026 ===
2026
Party	Candidate	Votes	%	±%
LDP	Masahiro Uehara	87,531	46.6	▲18.95
CDP	Hirofumi Ryu (Incumbent)	84,024	49.58 44.8	▼4.78
JCP	Hiroko Akaishi	16,186	8.6	▼1.35
Majority		3,507	1.8	▼20.13
Registered electors		335,938		
Turnout		187,741	57.68	▼0.30
LDP gain from CDP				

=== 2024 ===
2024
Party	Candidate	Votes	%	±%
CDP	Hirofumi Ryu (Incumbent)	93,878	49.58	▲7.18
LDP	Norihiro Nakayama	52,358	27.65	▼7.20
Ishin	Taisei Yoshida	24,283	12.82	▲0.41
JCP	Hiroko Akaishi	18,835	9.95	▼0.39
Majority		41,520	21.93	
Registered electors		334,691		
Turnout			57.98	▼1.49
CDP hold				

=== 2021 ===
2021
Party	Candidate	Votes	%	±%
CDP	Hirofumi Ryu (Incumbent)	83,847	42.40	New
LDP	Norihiro Nakayama (Won PR seat)	68,918	34.85	▼5.47
Ishin	Taisei Yoshida	24,547	12.41	New
JCP	Nodoka Saito	20,432	10.34	▼8.04
Majority		14,929	7.55	
Registered electors		338,241		
Turnout			59.47	▲4.42
CDP hold				

=== 2017 ===
2017
Party	Candidate	Votes	%	±%
Kibō no Tō	Hirofumi Ryu (Incumbent)	72,531	41.30	New
LDP	Norihiro Nakayama (Won PR seat)	70,819	40.32	▲5.12
JCP	Nodoka Saito	32,290	18.38	▲7.74
Majority		1,712	0.98	
Registered electors		327,305		
Turnout			55.05	▼1.61
Kibō no Tō hold				

=== 2014 ===
2014
Party	Candidate	Votes	%	±%
Democratic	Hirofumi Ryu (Incumbent)	64,534	37.87	▲1.02
LDP	Norihiro Nakayama (Won PR seat)	59,991	35.20	▲3.31
Innovation	Tsuyoshi Shiina	27,762	16.29	New
JCP	Nozomu Horiguchi	18,134	10.64	▲2.03
Majority		4,543	2.67	
Registered electors		307,305		
Turnout			56.66	▼5.45
Democratic hold				

=== 2012 ===
2012
Party	Candidate	Votes	%	±%
Democratic	Hirofumi Ryu (Incumbent)	67,448	36.85	▼26.69
LDP	Norihiro Nakayama (Won PR seat)	58,370	31.89	▲7.28
Your	Tsuyoshi Shiina (Won PR seat)	41,454	22.65	New
JCP	Nozomu Horiguchi	15,773	8.61	▲0.50
Majority		9,078	4.96	
Registered electors				
Turnout			62.11	
Democratic hold				

=== 2009 ===
2009
Party	Candidate	Votes	%	±%
Democratic	Hirofumi Ryu	127,219	63.54	▲19.03
LDP	Norihiro Nakayama	49,274	24.61	▼21.94
JCP	Takenori Tonegawa	16,239	8.11	▼0.83
Independent	Takanari Sudo	4,423	2.21	New
Happiness Realization	Hirotsugu Oguchi	3,055	1.53	New
Majority		77,945	38.93	
Registered electors				
Turnout				
Democratic gain from Your				

=== 2005 ===
2005
Party	Candidate	Votes	%	±%
LDP	Koichi Yamauchi	86,673	46.55	▲9.75
Democratic	Hirofumi Ryu (Incumbent) (Won PR seat)	82,878	44.51	▼5.82
JCP	Hajime Kamoshita	16,636	8.94	▼0.29
Majority		3,795	2.04	
Registered electors				
Turnout				
LDP gain from Democratic				

=== 2003 ===
2003
Party	Candidate	Votes	%	±%
Democratic	Hirofumi Ryu	78,590	50.33	▼2.29
LDP	Taku Nakaminato	57,457	36.80	▲8.90
JCP	Hajime Kamoshita	14,409	9.23	▼7.84
Independent	Takeharu Kobayashi	5,696	3.64	New
Majority		21,133	13.53	
Registered electors				
Turnout				
Democratic hold				

=== 2000 ===
2000
Party	Candidate	Votes	%	±%
Democratic	Shigefumi Matsuzawa (Incumbent)	122,551	52.62	New
LDP	Eiichi Ogawa	64,981	27.90	▲3.39
JCP	Mami Iguchi	39,751	17.07	▲0.74
Liberal League	Keiichi Tatesawa	5,633	2.41	▲1.06
Majority		57,570	24.72	
Registered electors				
Turnout				
Democratic hold				

=== 1996 ===
1996
Party	Candidate	Votes	%	±%
New Frontier	Shigefumi Matsuzawa	72,147	35.07	New
LDP	Eiichi Ogawa	50,423	24.51	New
Democratic	Masanori Konishi	46,782	22.74	New
JCP	Kazuo Fujii	33,596	16.33	New
Liberal League	Tadashi Takagi	2,788	1.35	New
Majority		21,724	10.56	
Registered electors				
Turnout				
New Frontier win (new seat)				
