= Naoki Minezaki =

Japanese politician

- 峰崎 直樹
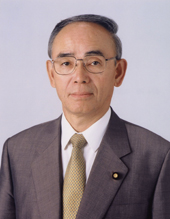
- Official portrait, 2009

Member of the House of Councillors
- In office 26 July 1992 – 25 July 2010
- Preceded by: Takakatsu Tsushima
- Succeeded by: Eri Tokunaga
- Constituency: Hokkaido at-large

Personal details
- Born: 14 October 1944 (age 81) Kure, Hiroshima, Japan
- Party: Democratic (1998–2010)
- Other political affiliations: JSP (1992–1996); SDP (1996); DP (1996–1998)
- Education: Hitotsubashi University

Naoki Minezaki (峰崎 直樹, Minezaki Naoki; born 14 October 1944) is a Japanese politician of the Democratic Party of Japan and a member of the House of Councillors in the Diet (national legislature). A native of Kure, Hiroshima and graduate of Hitotsubashi University, he was elected for the first time in 1992.

House of Councillors
Preceded by Takakatsu Tsushima; Masamitsu Iwamoto; Masaaki Takagi; Sadako Ogasawara	Councillor for Hokkaidō; 1992–2010; Served alongside: Yoshio Nakagawa	Succeeded by Gaku Hasegawa; Eri Tokunaga
Political offices
Preceded by Wataru Takeshita; Masatoshi Ishida	Senior Vice Minister of Finance; 2009–2010; Served alongside: Yoshihiko Noda, Motohisa Ikeda	Succeeded by Fumihiko Igarashi; Mitsuru Sakurai
