= 2007 Hokkaido gubernatorial election =

Election for Governor of Hokkaido

← 2003	8 April 2007	2011 →
- Turnout: 64.13%
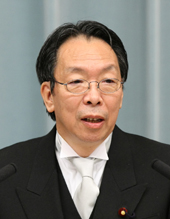
Nominee	Harumi Takahashi	Satoshi Arai	Satoshi Miyauchi
Party	Independent	Independent	JCP
Popular vote	1,738,569	981,994	184,969
Governor before election
Harumi Takahashi
Independent
Elected Governor
Harumi Takahashi
Independent

A gubernatorial election was held on 8 April 2007 to elect the Governor of Hokkaido Prefecture.

== Candidates ==
- Harumi Takahashi - incumbent governor of Hokkaido, age 53.
- Satoshi Arai - member of the House of Representatives, age 60.
- Satoshi Miyauchi (宮内聡, Miyauchi Satoshi) - full-time member of the Communist Party's Hokkaido Committee, age 43.

== Results ==
2007 Hokkaido gubernatorial election
Party	Candidate	Votes	%	±%
Independent	Harumi Takahashi *	1,738,569		
Independent	Satoshi Arai	981,994		
JCP	Satoshi Miyauchi	184,969		
Turnout		2,927,113	64.13	
