= Kenji Katsube =

Japanese politician

- 勝部 賢志
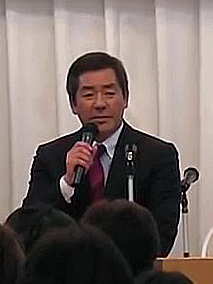
- Katsube in 2018

Member of the House of Councillors
- Incumbent
- Assumed office 29 July 2019
- Preceded by: Katsuya Ogawa
- Constituency: Hokkaido at-large

Member of the Hokkaido Legislative Assembly
- In office 30 April 2015 – 2019
- Constituency: Ebetsu City
- In office 30 April 2003 – 2014
- Constituency: Ebetsu City

Personal details
- Born: 6 September 1959 (age 67) Chitose, Hokkaido, Japan
- Party: CDP (since 2018)
- Other political affiliations: DPJ (2014–2016); DP (2016–2018)
- Education: Hokkaido University of Education

Kenji Katsube (born 6 September 1959, in Hokkaido, Japan) is a Japanese politician who has served as a member of the House of Councillors of Japan since 2019. He is one of the six representatives of the Hokkaido at-large district, and is a member of the Constitutional Democratic Party.

== Career ==
Katsube graduated from the Hokkaido University of Education in 1984, and worked as an elementary school teacher from 1984 to 2000. In 2000, he took a full-time job with the prefectural teachers union. From 2003 to 2019, he was a member of the Hokkaido Prefectural Assembly, serving as vice-chairman from 2017 to 2019. He was elected to the House of Councillors in the 2019 election; his term ends in 2025.

As of 18 July 2023, he is a member of the following committees:

- Committee on Financial Affairs
- Committee on Rules and Administration
