= 1987 Hokkaido gubernatorial election =

Election for Governor of Hokkaido

← 1983	12 April 1987	1991 →
- Turnout: 78.33%
Nominee	Takahiro Yokomichi	Akira Matsuura	Tomiya Yamabe
Party	Independent	Independent	Independent
Popular vote	2,110,730	887,306	125,604
Governor before election
Takahiro Yokomichi
Independent
Elected Governor
Takahiro Yokomichi
Independent

A gubernatorial election was held on 12 April 1987 to elect the Governor of Hokkaido Prefecture.

== Candidates ==
- Takahiro Yokomichi - incumbent governor of Hokkaido, age 46.
- Akira Matsuura - Secretary of the Food Agency, age 57.
- Tomiya Yamabe (山辺富也, Yamabe Tomiya) - president of the Hokkaido Medical Institution, age 60.

== Results ==
1987 Hokkaido gubernatorial election
Party	Candidate	Votes	%	±%
Independent	Takahiro Yokomichi *	2,110,730		
Independent	Akira Matsuura	887,306		
Independent	Tomiya Yamabe	125,604		
Turnout		3,144,906	78.33	
