= 1983 Hokkaido gubernatorial election =

Election for Governor of Hokkaido

← 1979	10 April 1983	1987 →
- Turnout: 83.89%
Nominee	Takahiro Yokomichi	Ken'ichirō Mikami	Rokuo Hiroya
Party	Independent	Independent	Independent
Popular vote	1,597,590	1,526,230	136,629
Governor before election
Naohiro Dōgakinai
Independent
Elected Governor
Takahiro Yokomichi
Independent

A gubernatorial election was held on 10 April 1983 to elect the Governor of Hokkaido Prefecture.

== Candidates ==
- Takahiro Yokomichi - member of the House of Representatives, age 42.
- Ken'ichirō Mikami (三上顕一郎, Mikami Ken'ichirō) - former Vice-Governor of Hokkaido, age 55.
- Rokuo Hiroya - lawyer, age 54.

== Results ==
1983 Hokkaido gubernatorial election
Party	Candidate	Votes	%	±%
Independent	Takahiro Yokomichi	1,597,590		
Independent	Ken'ichirō Mikami	1,526,230		
Independent	Rokuo Hiroya	136,629		
Turnout		3,282,472	83.89	
