= Koichi Yamauchi =

Japanese politician (born 1973)

- 山内 康一

Member of the House of Representatives
- In office 23 October 2017 – 14 October 2021
- Constituency: Kyushu PR
- In office 11 September 2005 – 21 November 2014
- Preceded by: Hirofumi Ryu
- Succeeded by: Multi-member district
- Constituency: Kanagawa 9th (2005–2009); Northern Kanto PR (2009–2014)

Personal details
- Born: 25 August 1973 (age 53) Chikushino, Fukuoka, Japan
- Party: CDP (since 2017)
- Other political affiliations: LDP (2005–2009); Your Party (2009–2014); DPJ (2014–2016); DP (2016–2017)
- Education: International Christian University; University College London

Koichi Yamauchi (山内 康一, Yamauchi Kōichi; born 25 August 1973) is a former Japanese politician of Constitutional Democratic Party of Japan, formerly of the Liberal Democratic Party and Your Party, who served as a member of the House of Representatives in the Diet (national legislature).

== Career ==
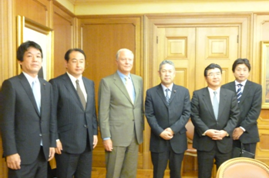
Yamauchi with Kentarō Sonoura, Nobuhide Minorikawa, George Provopoulos, Tsutomu Satō and Sakihito Ozawa (23 September 2013)

A native of Fukuoka Prefecture, he attended Silliman University in Philippines while he was an undergraduate at International Christian University. He also received a master's degree from the Institute of Education at the University of London. He was elected to the House of Representatives for the first time in 2005.
