= 2023 Sapporo mayoral election =

Local election in Japan

- 1 May 2023
- Turnout: 50.99%

Candidate	Katsuhiro Akimoto	Kaoru Takano	Hideo Kibata
Party	Independent	Independent	Independent
Popular vote	458,221	234,834	124,692
Percentage	56.0%	28.7%	15.2%
Supported by	Constitutional Democratic Party of Japan		Japanese Communist Party
Mayor before election
Katsuhiro Akimoto
Independent
Elected mayor
Katsuhiro Akimoto
Independent

The 2023 Sapporo Mayoral Election was held on 1 May 2023 as part of the 2023 Japanese unified local elections to elect the mayor of Sapporo. Incumbent Katsuhiro Akimoto won with a 56% majority.

A major issue of the election included Sapporo's bid to host the 2030 Winter Olympics. Akimoto was a firm supporter of holding the olympic games in the city.
