= Hachiro Nitta (politician) =

Japanese politician

- 新田 八朗
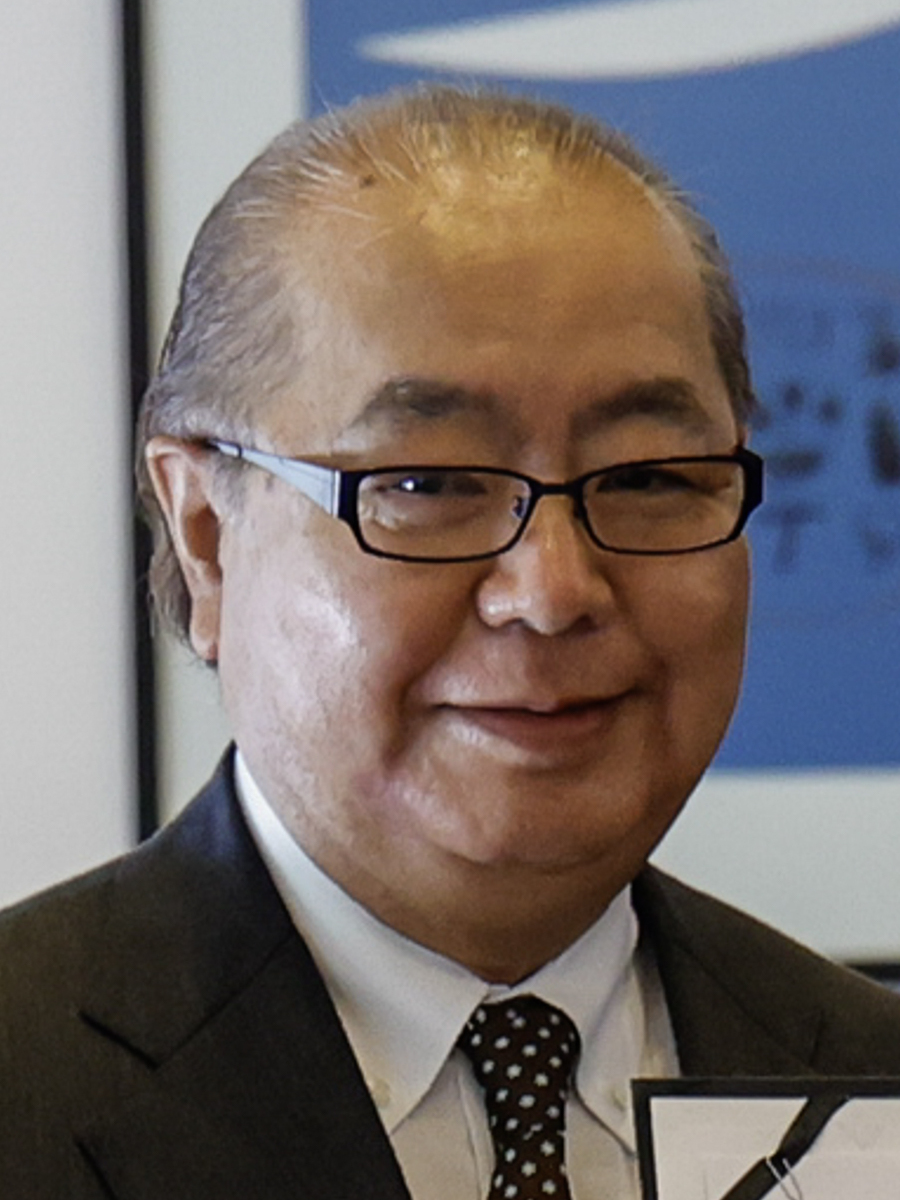
- Nitta in 2025

Governor of Toyama Prefecture
- Incumbent
- Assumed office 9 November 2020
- Monarch: Naruhito
- Preceded by: Takakazu Ishii

Personal details
- Born: 27 August 1958 (age 68) Toyama City, Toyama, Japan
- Party: Independent
- Relatives: Harumi Takahashi (sister)
- Education: Hitotsubashi University (BEc)

Hachiro Nitta (新田 八朗, Nitta Hachirō; born 27 August 1958) is a Japanese politician who has served as governor of Toyama Prefecture since 2020.

== Early life ==
Nita was born in Toyama City, Toyama, Japan in 1958. He attended Toyama University Elementary and Junior High schools, and the Toyama Prefectural Toyama High School. He graduated from the Hitotsubashi University faculty of econimics.

== Business career ==
After graduating from university, Nitta joined the Daiichi Kangyo bank. He worked at the bank for two years before returning home to Toyama to work for Nihonkai Gas Co, a Toyama based gas firm, where his father was president. In 2000, he took over the presidency of the company from his father.

Nitta also served as the President of the Junior Chamber of Japan, representative secretary of the Toyama branch of the Japanese Association of Corporate Executives, and director of the Hokuriku Economic Federation.

== Political career ==
Nitta was elected as governor of Toyama in 2020 as an independent candidate, defeating Takakazu Ishii, the five time incumbent Governor from the Liberal Democratic Party. He won by gaining the support of some local LDP politicians, and splitting the party vote. He ran on a platform of using his corporate experience to help rebuild Toyama's economy.

Nitta was reelected to a second four-year term in 2024, winning more than 80 percent of the vote, running on a platform of supporting local recover from the 2024 Noto earthquake.

== Family ==
Nitta’s older sister is Liberal Democratic Party politician Harumi Takahashi.

Nitta’s grandfather Takekuni Takaysuji was also a two-term Governor of Toyama Pefecture.
