= Katsuhiro Akimoto =

Japanese politician

- 秋元 克広

Mayor of Sapporo
- Incumbent
- Assumed office 2 May 2015
- Preceded by: Fumio Ueda

Personal details
- Born: 2 February 1956 (age 70) Yūbari, Hokkaido, Japan
- Party: Independent
- Education: Hokkaido University; Bachelor of Law
- Website: sapporo-akimoto.jp

Katsuhiro Akimoto (秋元 克広, Akimoto Katsuhiro) is a Japanese politician and the incumbent mayor of Sapporo, the largest and capital city of Hokkaido, Japan.

Following victory in the 2023 Sapporo mayoral election, Akimoto is currently serving his 3rd term as mayor.
