= Fumio Ueda =

Japanese politician (1948–2025)

- 上田 文雄
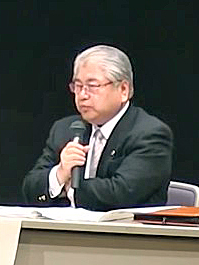
- March 2018

Mayor of Sapporo
- In office 9 June 2003 – 1 May 2015
- Preceded by: Nobuo Katsura
- Succeeded by: Katsuhiro Akimoto

Personal details
- Born: June 11, 1948 Makubetsu, Hokkaido, Japan
- Died: September 18, 2025 (aged 77) Sapporo, Hokkaido, Japan
- Education: Chuo University

Fumio Ueda (上田 文雄, Ueda Fumio; June 11, 1948 – September 18, 2025) was a Japanese politician who was the mayor of Sapporo, capital city of Hokkaido.

== Life and career ==
Ueda was born in Makubetsu, Hokkaido on June 11, 1948. He graduated from the law department of Chuo University in 1972. Ueda became an attorney and opened a law practice in 1978. At various times he served as vice-chairman of the Sapporo Bar Association, chaired its committees on children's rights, environmental protection and consumer protection, and served as vice-chairman of the human rights committee at the Japan Federation of Bar Associations.

He was first elected in 2003 with the support of the Democratic Party of Japan and RENGO after an unsuccessful run in the same year prior to being elected. His main policy goal was to reduce the city's municipal debt, and he managed to achieve a reduction in the debt from 2.2 trillion yen in 2003 to 1.7 trillion yen at the end of fiscal year 2014. In 2014, at the age of 66, he decided not to run for a fourth term. He was rumored to be a candidate for the Hokkaido gubernatorial election in 2015, but declined to run. He was succeeded in 2015 by his deputy Katsuhiro Akimoto, who was supported by most of Ueda's historical electoral base.

Ueda co-hosted a show on Hokkaido Television Broadcasting called Ueda Fumio no Namara Takakunai?!, showcasing the most expensive items in Sapporo in various categories.

Ueda died of pancreatic cancer in Sapporo, on 18 September 2025, at the age of 77.
