= Chūichi Date =

Japanese politician (born 1939)

- 伊達 忠一
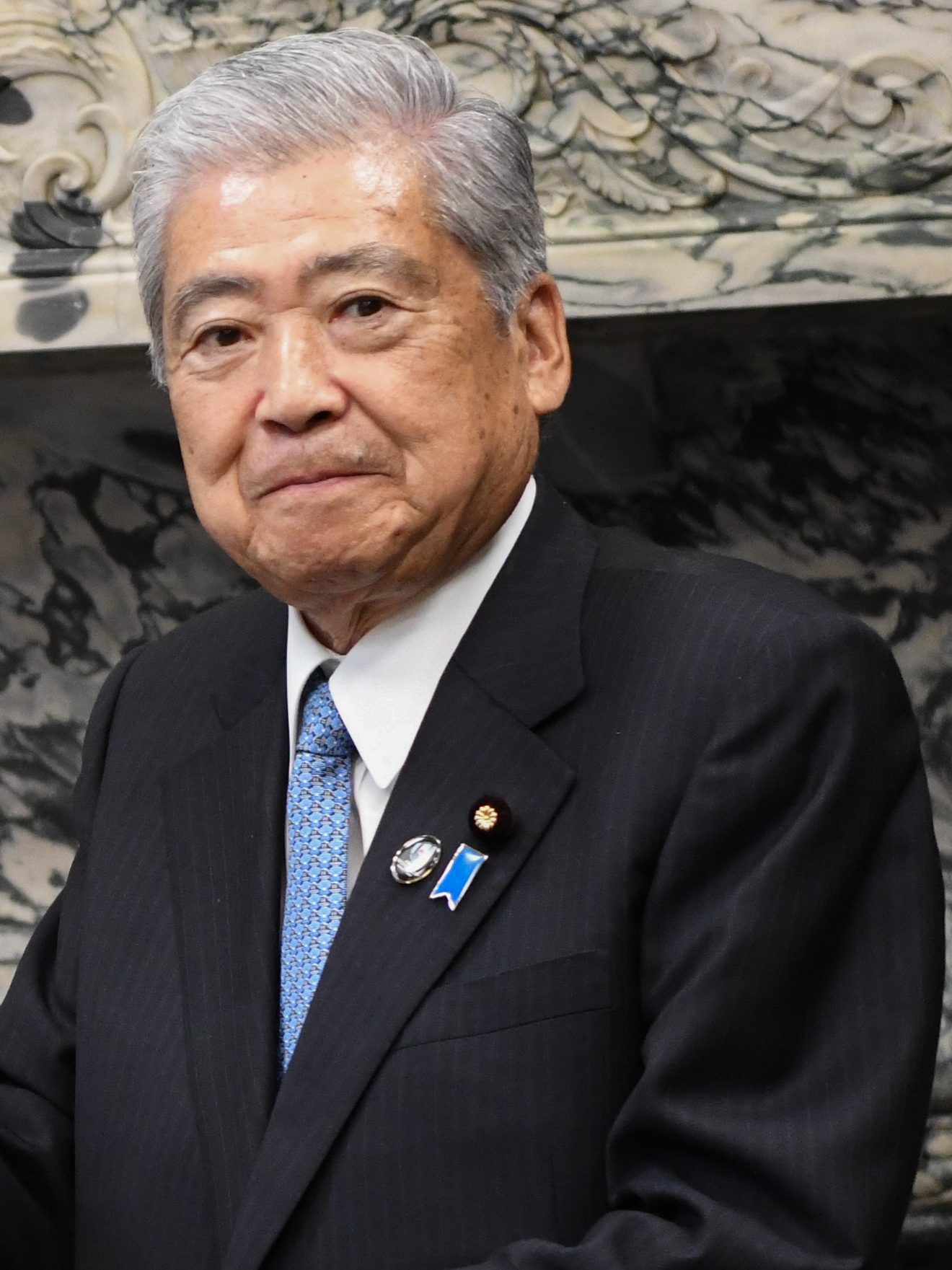
- Date in 2019

President of the House of Councillors
- In office 1 August 2016 – 28 July 2019
- Monarchs: Akihito; Naruhito
- Vice President: Akira Gunji
- Preceded by: Masaaki Yamazaki
- Succeeded by: Akiko Santō

Member of the House of Councillors
- In office 29 July 2001 – 28 July 2019
- Preceded by: Hisamitsu Sugano
- Succeeded by: Harumi Takahashi
- Constituency: Hokkaido at-large

Member of the Hokkaido Legislative Assembly
- In office 1991–2001
- Constituency: Atsubetsu Ward
- In office 1983–1987
- Constituency: Ashibetsu City

Personal details
- Born: 20 January 1939 (age 87) Ashibetsu, Hokkaido, Japan
- Party: Liberal Democratic
- Education: Sapporo Medical University

Chūichi Date (伊達 忠一, Date Chūichi; born January 20, 1939) is a Japanese retired politician of the Liberal Democratic Party who served three terms in the House of Councillors in the Diet (national legislature) and also served as the LDP's National Diet Committee Chairman.

A native of Ashibetsu, Hokkaido and high school graduate, he was elected to the House of Councillors for the first time in 2001 after serving in the Hokkaido Prefectural Assembly. He was a former President of the House of Councillors.

After the assassination of Shinzo Abe in July 2022 he admitted that he had asked Abe for votes from the Unification Church (UC) in the 2016 Upper House election. According to Hokkaido Television Broadcasting reporting, Date has participated in at least three events sponsored by the UC and its front organisations, including an online event in August 2020, where he stated, "I believe that the spirit of coexistence, co-prosperity, and shared meaning, which leaders Moon and Han are preaching, is more desperately needed today than ever." Date testified that when he supported Yoshifumi Miyajima of the LDP, who ran for the House of Councillors in the 2016 national proportional election, he asked Shinzo Abe to provide votes supplied from the UC. He said that Abe agreed and Miyajima was elected for the first time, but that Abe refused to allow him to run for the Upper House this time, and Miyajima had to withdraw from the race. The UC support was instead distributed to Inoue Yoshiyuki.
