= Yasuko Takemura =

Japanese politician (1933–2025)

- 竹村 泰子

Member of the House of Councillors
- In office 22 July 1989 – 28 July 2001
- Preceded by: Kaneyasu Marutani
- Succeeded by: Multi-member district
- Constituency: Hokkaido at-large (1989–1995); National PR (1995–2001)

Member of the House of Representatives
- In office 18 December 1983 – 2 June 1986
- Preceded by: Takahiro Yokomichi
- Succeeded by: Shizuo Satō
- Constituency: Hokkaido 1st

Personal details
- Born: 5 December 1933 Kobe, Hyōgo, Japan
- Died: 27 March 2025 (aged 91) Sapporo, Hokkaido, Japan
- Party: Democratic
- Other political affiliations: JSP (1983–1996); SDP (1996); DP (1996–1998)

Yasuko Takemura (竹村 泰子, Takemura Yasuko; 5 December 1933 – 27 March 2025) was a Japanese politician. She served one term as a member of the House of Representatives and two terms in the House of Councillors.

== Early life and career ==
Yasuo Takemura was born in Kobe, Japan on 5 December 1933. She attended Kwansei Gakuin Junior College for a period before dropping out and working as a freelance television announcer. Then, after her marriage, she moved to Sapporo, where she became a citizen activist, advocating for peace, human rights, the environment, and ethnic issues.

== Political career ==
In the 1983 Japanese general election, Takemura ran as an independent for one of the seats representing the Hokkaido 1st district in the House of Representatives. Endorsed by the Japan Socialist Party and the New Liberal Club, she was elected and served a nearly three-year term. However, she lost her seat in the 1986 Japanese general election.

In the 1989 Japanese House of Councillors election, Takemura was elected as a councillor for the Hokkaido at-large district, running as an independent with endorsements from the Socialists, the New Liberals, the Socialist Democratic Federation, and the Salaryman New Party. In 1992, she was named shadow minister of justice in the Socialist Party Shadow Cabinet, formally joining the party two years later. She was re-elected to her seat in the 1995 Japanese House of Councillors election.

In 1996, she left the Socialist Party to join the newly formed Democratic Party. She ran for re-election in the 2001 Japanese House of Councillors election as a member of the successor Democratic Party of Japan, but she failed to regain her seat, retiring from politics.

Takemura died in Sapporo on 27 March 2025, at the age of 91.
