= 1991 Hokkaido gubernatorial election =

Election for Governor of Hokkaido

← 1987	7 April 1991	1995 →
- Turnout: 71.79%

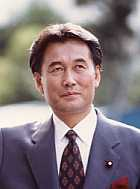
Nominee	Takahiro Yokomichi	Shizuo Satō	Toshio Saitō
Party	Independent	Independent	Independent
Popular vote	2,054,453	744,236	131,143
Nominee	Toshio Tsuzuki
Party	Independent
Popular vote	12,715
Governor before election
Takahiro Yokomichi
Independent
Elected Governor
Takahiro Yokomichi
Independent

A gubernatorial election was held on 7 April 1991 to elect the Governor of Hokkaido Prefecture.

== Candidates ==
- Takahiro Yokomichi - incumbent governor of Hokkaido, age 50.
- Shizuo Satō - member of the House of Representatives, age 49.
- Toshio Saitō (斎藤敏夫, Saitō Toshio), age 62.
- Toshio Tsuzuki - agricultural economist, age 60.

== Results ==
1991 Hokkaido gubernatorial election
Party	Candidate	Votes	%	±%
Independent	Takahiro Yokomichi *	2,054,453		
Independent	Shizuo Satō	744,236		
Independent	Toshio Saitō	131,143		
Independent	Toshio Tsuzuki	12,715		
