= Kazuya Hatayama =

Japanese politician

- 畠山 和也
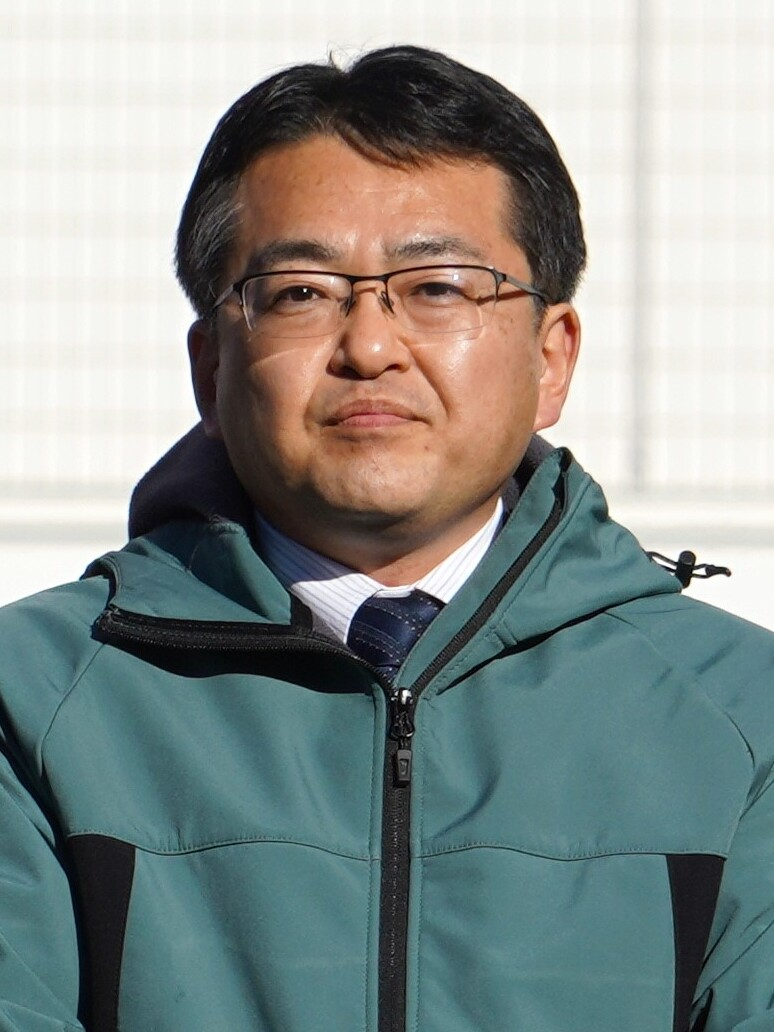
- Hatayama in 2025

Member of the House of Representatives
- In office 19 December 2014 – 28 September 2017
- Constituency: Hokkaido PR

Personal details
- Born: 20 August 1971 (age 55) Ishinomaki, Miyagi, Japan
- Party: Communist
- Education: Miyagi University of Education; Hokkaido University of Education

Kazuya Hatayama (畠山 和也, Hatayama Kazuya) is a member of the Japanese Communist Party that was elected in to the House of Representatives, representing the Hokkaido proportional representation block. He is against the Trans-Pacific Partnership and thinks that Japan should demand the return of the Kuril Islands from Russia.
