= 2015 Hokkaido gubernatorial election =

Election

- 12 April 2015
- Turnout: 59.62%
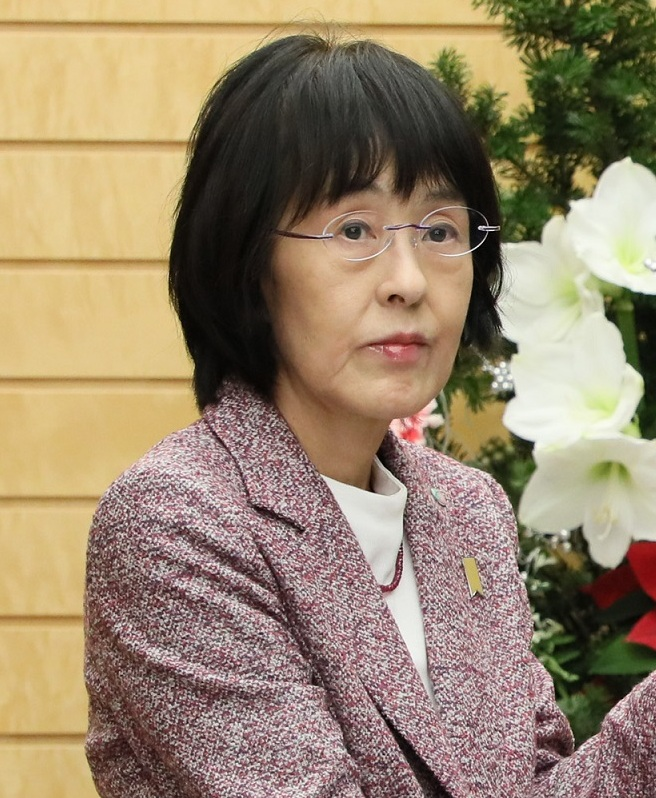

Nominee	Harumi Takahashi	Noriyuki Sato
Party	Independent	Independent
Popular vote	1,496,915	1,146,573
Percentage	56.15%	43.01%
Governor before election
Harumi Takahashi
Independent
Elected Governor
Harumi Takahashi
Independent

A gubernatorial election was held on 12 April 2015 to elect the Governor of Hokkaido Prefecture.

== Candidates ==
- Harumi Takahashi – incumbent governor of Hokkaido, age 61.
- Noriyuki Sato (broadcaster), age 65.

== Results ==
2015 Hokkaido gubernatorial election
Party	Candidate	Votes	%	±%
Independent	Harumi Takahashi *	1,496,915	56.15	
Independent	Noriyuki Sato	1,146,573	43.01	
Turnout		2,665,803	59.62	
