= Hisashi Kazama =

Japanese politician

- 風間 昶
- Official portrait, 2001

Member of the House of Councillors
- In office 26 July 1992 – 25 July 2010
- Preceded by: Masamitsu Iwamoto
- Succeeded by: Multi-member district
- Constituency: Hokkaido at-large (1992–1998); National PR (1998–2010)

Personal details
- Born: 6 May 1947 (age 79) Kenbuchi, Hokkaido, Japan
- Party: Komeito (1998–2010)
- Other political affiliations: CGP (1992–1998)
- Relatives: Hirotaka Ishikawa (son-in-law)
- Education: Sapporo Medical University

Hisashi Kazama (風間 昶, Kazama Hisashi; born 6 May 1947) is a former Japanese politician of the New Komeito Party, who served as a member of the House of Councillors in the Diet (national legislature). A native of Kamikawa (Teshio) District, Hokkaidō and graduate of Sapporo Medical University, he was elected for the first time in 1992.
