= Sapporo Medical University =

University in Japan

Coordinates: 43°3′20.21″N 141°19′54.15″E

- 札幌医科大学
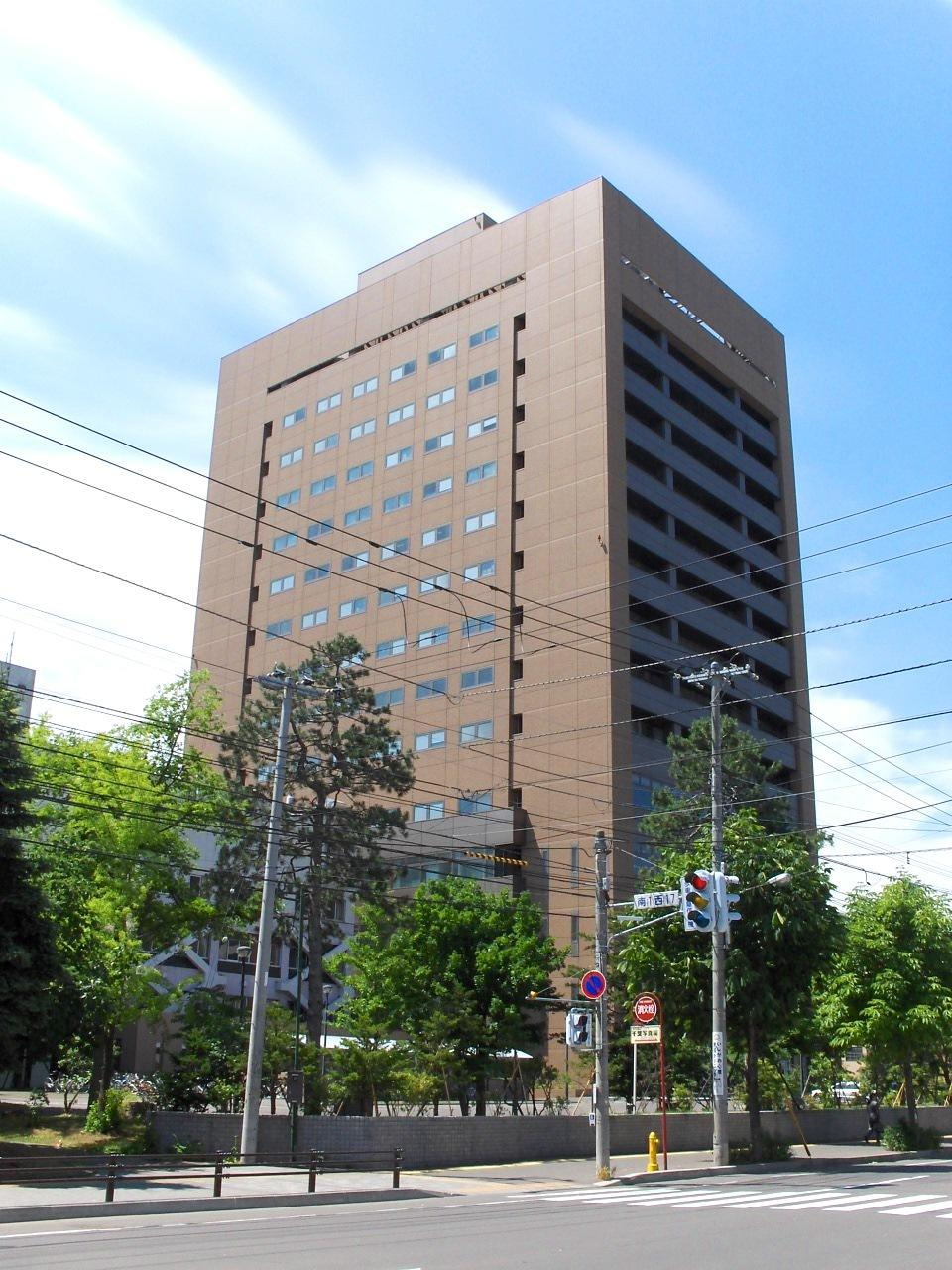
- The building of Sapporo Medical University
- Former names: Hokkaidō Women's Medical College
- Type: public
- Established: 1950
- President: Taiji Tsukamoto
- Students: 1016 (as of 2006)
- Location: Sapporo, Hokkaidō, Japan
- Campus: urban
- Nickname: SMU
- Website: www.web.sapmed.ac.jp

Sapporo Medical University (札幌医科大学, Sapporo ika daigaku) is a public university in Chūō-ku, Sapporo, Hokkaidō, Japan. The precursor of the school was founded in 1945, and it was chartered as a university in 1950.

== History ==
The Hokkaidō Women's Medical College (北海道立女子医学専門学校, Hokkaidōritsu joshi igaku semmon gakkō), the precursor of the university, was founded in 1945. The Sapporo Medical University was established in 1950 with the School of Medicine, and the Graduate School of Medicine was also founded in 1956, as part of Hokkaidō's development project.

In 1968, Jurō Wada, one of the pioneers of heart surgery, performed a heart transplant for the first time in Japan, which was later accused of a failure in the Wada Heart Transplant Incident. The Sapporo Medical University Hygiene Junior College was established in 1983, and it was reorganized and incorporated to its current School of Health Science in 1993.

== Overview ==
The university has a hospital in affiliation, called Sapporo Medical University Hospital, and has performed a number of surgeries including organ transplant. It hosts the Bilomedical Research Center, the Marine Biological Institute, Biomedical Center and Animal Research Center. The university also has some laboratories and institutes which affiliated with Hokkaidō University and Otaru University of Commerce.

== Notable alumni ==
- Hisashi Kazama - a politician
- Junichi Watanabe - a novelist, a winner of Naoki Prize
