= Eri Tokunaga (politician) =

Japanese politician and television reporter

- 徳永 エリ
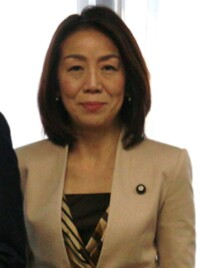
- Tokunaga in 2019

Member of the House of Councillors
- Incumbent
- Assumed office 26 July 2010
- Preceded by: Naoki Minezaki
- Constituency: Hokkaido at-large

Personal details
- Born: 1 January 1962 (age 64) Sapporo, Hokkaido, Japan
- Party: CDP (since 2020)
- Other political affiliations: DPJ (2010–2016); DP (2016–2018); DPP (2018–2020)
- Education: Hosei University

Eri Tokunaga (徳永エリ, Tokunaga Eri; born 1 January 1962) is a Japanese politician and former television reporter from the Constitutional Democratic Party of Japan. She currently serves as member of the House of Councillors for the Hokkaido At-large district. Tokunaga is part of the CDP's shadow cabinet 'Next Cabinet' as the shadow Deputy Chief Cabinet Secretary.

Before entering in politics she worked as reporter for some TV shows in Nippon Television, TV Asahi, and TBS. She attended Hosei University in the Department of Law.
