= Hirofumi Ryu =

Japanese politician

- 笠 浩史
- Official portrait, 2012

Member of the House of Representatives; from Southern Kanto
- Incumbent
- Assumed office 10 November 2003
- Preceded by: Shigefumi Matsuzawa
- Constituency: See list: Kanagawa 9th (2003–2005); PR block (2005–2009); Kanagawa 9th (2009–2026); PR block (2026–present)

Personal details
- Born: 3 January 1965 (age 61) Fukuoka, Japan
- Party: DRP (since 2026)
- Other political affiliations: DPJ (2003–2016); DP (2016–2017); KnT (2017–2020); CDP (2020–2026); CRA (2026)
- Education: Keio University

Hirofumi Ryu (笠 浩史, Ryū Hirofumi; born 3 January 1965) is a Japanese politician of the Constitutional Democratic Party, who serves as a member of the House of Representatives in the Diet (national legislature).

== Career ==
A native of Fukuoka City and graduate of the Faculty of Letters at Keio University, Ryu was elected to the House of Representatives for the first time in 2003 after working at TV Asahi in the Marketing and Broadcasting departments.

His profile on the DPJ website also states that he serves as Chief Vice Secretary General and Deputy Chair, Election Campaign Committee within the party, and that his career also included the following positions:

- Parliamentary Secretary of Education, Culture, Sports, Science and Technology
- Senior Vice Chair, Diet Affairs Committee
- Leader, Kanagawa Prefectural Headquarters, DPJ

When Yoshihiko Noda was elected CDP leader in September 2024, Ryu was appointed chairman of the Diet Affairs Committee.

== Right-wing positions ==
Affiliated to the openly revisionist lobby Nippon Kaigi, Ryu was a supporter of right-wing filmmaker Satoru Mizushima's 2007 revisionist film The Truth about Nanjing, which denied that the Nanjing Massacre ever occurred, and among the people who signed 'THE FACTS', an ad published in The Washington Post on 14 June 2007, in order to protest against United States House of Representatives House Resolution 121, and to deny the existence of sexual slavery for the Imperial military ("Comfort women").

Ryu gave the following answers to the questionnaire submitted by Mainichi to parliamentarians in 2012:

- in favor of the revision of the Constitution
- in favor of right of collective self-defense (revision of Article 9)
- in favor of reform of the National assembly (unicameral instead of bicameral)
- in favor of reactivating nuclear power plants
- in favor of zero nuclear power by 2030s
- in favor of the relocation of Marine Corps Air Station Futenma (Okinawa)
- in favor of evaluating the purchase of Senkaku Islands by Japan
- in favor of a strong attitude versus China
- against the reform of the Imperial Household that would allow women to retain their Imperial status even after marriage
- against the participation of Japan to the Trans-Pacific Partnership
- against a nuclear-armed Japan

House of Representatives (Japan)
Preceded by Kee Miki	Chairman of the Special Committee on Consumer Affairs; 2026–present	Incumbent
Party political offices
Preceded by Jun Azumi	Chairman of the Diet Affairs Committee, Constitutional Democratic Party; 2024–2026	Succeeded by Yoshitaka Saitō
