= Tatsuya Hori =

Japanese politician (1935–2026)

Hori Tatsuya
- 堀 達也
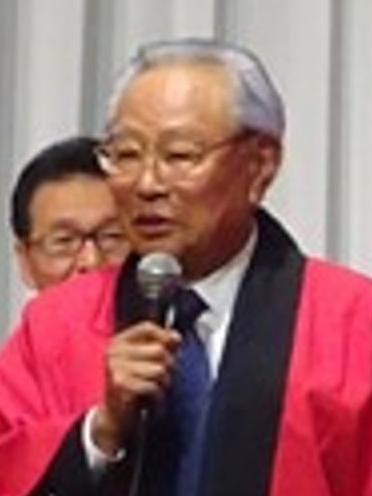
- Hori in 2016

5th Governor of Hokkaidō
- In office 9 April 1995 – 22 April 2003
- Monarch: Akihito
- Preceded by: Takahiro Yokomichi
- Succeeded by: Harumi Takahashi

Personal details
- Born: 22 November 1935 Tomakishi, Karafuto Prefecture, Japan
- Died: 16 May 2026 (aged 90) Sapporo, Japan
- Party: Independent
- Education: Hokkaido University; Tokyo University of Agriculture
- Occupation: Administrator, politician, lecturer

Tatsuya Hori (堀 達也, Hori Tatsuya; 22 November 1935 – 16 May 2026) was a Japanese politician. He was director of the Hokkaidō-Kitami University. From 1995 he served as governor of Hokkaidō for two terms totalling eight years. He was chairman of the board of Sapporo University. Hori was an associate professor at Tokyo University of Agriculture.

== Life and career ==
Tatsuya Hori originally came from Tomakishi, Karafuto (Vakhrushev, Sakhalin). He was raised in Engaru, Hokkaidō in Okhotsk Subprefecture. In 1958 he graduated from Hokkaidō University Department of Agriculture and entered service in the Hokkaidō government.

Under Governor Takahiro Yokomichi, he was assistant director of the Public Works Department, room monitor for the governor, and municipal utility administrator. He served as lieutenant governor. In 1995 he ran and won election to the office of governor as an independent with the support of the New Frontier Party, the Japan Socialist Party, the Democratic Socialist Party, and the Justice Party. He was reelected to a second term with the support of the Liberal Democratic Party, the Democratic Party, the Justice Party, the Social Democratic Party, and the Democratic Socialist Party.

In 1997, after the bankruptcy of the Hokkaidō Colonization Bank, he declared a state of emergency and called for a restructuring of Hokkaidō, but public utilities expenses deteriorated for which he will always be remembered. He gave up running for a third term. After stepping down as governor, he assumed the office of board chairman of Sapporo University in August 2008.

Hori died from lung cancer at a hospital in Sapporo, on 16 May 2026, at the age of 90.

== Career summary ==
- March 1958 graduated from the Hokkaidō University Department of Agriculture
- April 1958 hired by the Hokkaidō Government Agency
- June 1993 became Lieutenant Governor
- 9 April 1995 elected Governor of Hokkaidō with 1,636,360 votes
- 11 April 1999 re-elected Governor of Hokkaidō with 1,593,251 votes
- 9 August 2004 became chairman of the board of Sapporo University

Political offices
Preceded by Takahiro Yokomichi	Governor of Hokkaido; 1995–2003	Succeeded by Harumi Takahashi
