= Shigefumi Matsuzawa =

Japanese politician

- 松沢 成文
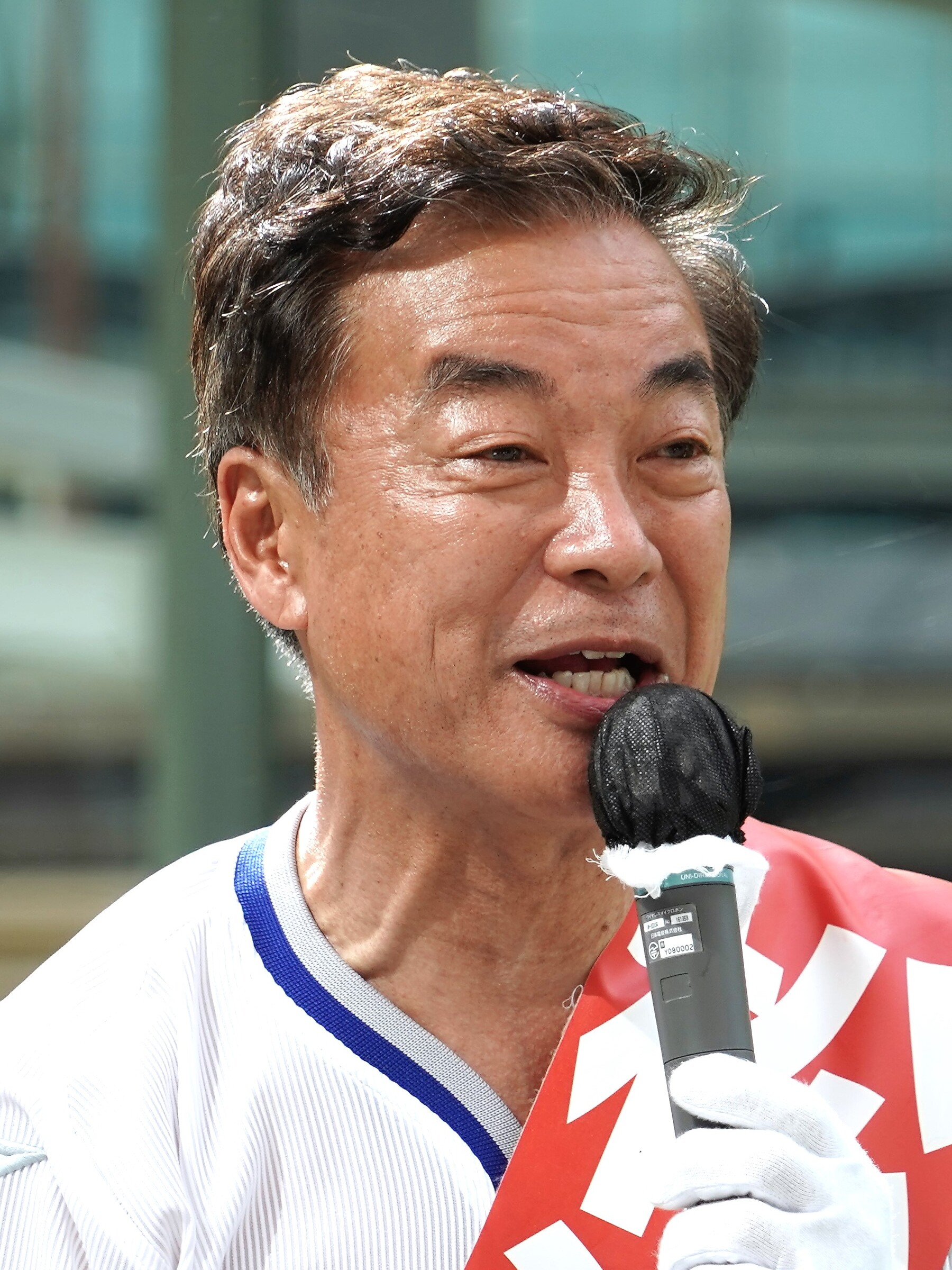
- Matsuzawa in 2022

Member of the House of Councillors
- Incumbent
- Assumed office 26 July 2022
- Preceded by: Nobuhiro Miura
- Constituency: Kanagawa at-large
- In office 29 July 2013 – 8 August 2021
- Preceded by: Akira Matsu
- Succeeded by: Motoko Mizuno
- Constituency: Kanagawa at-large

Leader of Kibō no Tō
- In office 7 May 2018 – 28 May 2019
- Preceded by: Yuichiro Tamaki
- Succeeded by: Nariaki Nakayama

Governor of Kanagawa Prefecture
- In office 23 April 2003 – 23 April 2011
- Monarch: Akihito
- Preceded by: Hiroshi Okazaki
- Succeeded by: Yūji Kuroiwa

Member of the House of Representatives
- In office 19 July 1993 – 27 March 2003
- Preceded by: Yoshiaki Harada
- Succeeded by: Hirofumi Ryu
- Constituency: Kanagawa 2nd (1993–1996); Kanagawa 9th (1996–2003)

Member of the Kanagawa Prefectural Assembly
- In office April 1987 – 6 July 1993
- Constituency: Asao Ward, Kawasaki City

Personal details
- Born: 2 April 1958 (age 68) Kawasaki, Kanagawa, Japan
- Party: JIP (since 2019)
- Other political affiliations: JRP (1993–1994); NFP (1994–1998); VotP (1998); GGP (1998); DPJ (1998–2001); Independent (2001–2012; 2015-2018); Your (2012–2014); PFG (2014–2015); Kibō no Tō (2018–2019)
- Education: Keio University

Shigefumi Matsuzawa (松沢 成文, Matsuzawa Shigefumi; born 2 April 1958) is a Japanese politician and a current member of the House of Councillors for the Kanagawa at-large district in the Diet of Japan.

== Early life ==
Matsuzawa is a native of Kawasaki, Kanagawa and graduated from Keio University with a bachelor's degree in Political Science.

During his time as a graduate student at the Matsushita School of Government, Matsuzawa lived in Frederick, Maryland for a year and worked in the office of then - U.S. Congresswoman Beverly Byron (July 27, 1932 – February 9, 2025), studying the 1984 U.S. presidential election, which became the subject of a book he wrote and published in Japan in 1985.

== Political career ==
Before being elected to the House of Representatives, Matsuzawa had previously served in the assembly of Kanagawa Prefecture for two terms from 1987 to 1993.

He was elected to the House of Representatives in the Diet for the first time in 1993, and served for three terms until 2003.

In 2003 he became the governor of Kanagawa Prefecture and he served in that position until 2011.

Finally, Matsuzawa was elected to the House of Councillors in 2013 as a member of Your Party. Upon the dissolution of Your Party in November 2014 he joined the Party for Future Generations. He left the party in August 2015 and sat as an independent until becoming the leader of Kibō no Tō in May 2018. He resigned as leader on 28 May 2019, and was succeeded by Nariaki Nakayama. He subsequently left the party and joined Nippon Ishin no Kai.

In 2021 he gave up his seat to run for the mayoralty of Yokohama. He did not succeed in winning the Mayoral election, and instead ran for the House of Councillors once more in the 2022 election, which he won, returning to that body.

He was affiliated with the openly nationalist organisation Nippon Kaigi.
