= Harumi Takahashi =

Japanese politician

- 高橋 はるみ
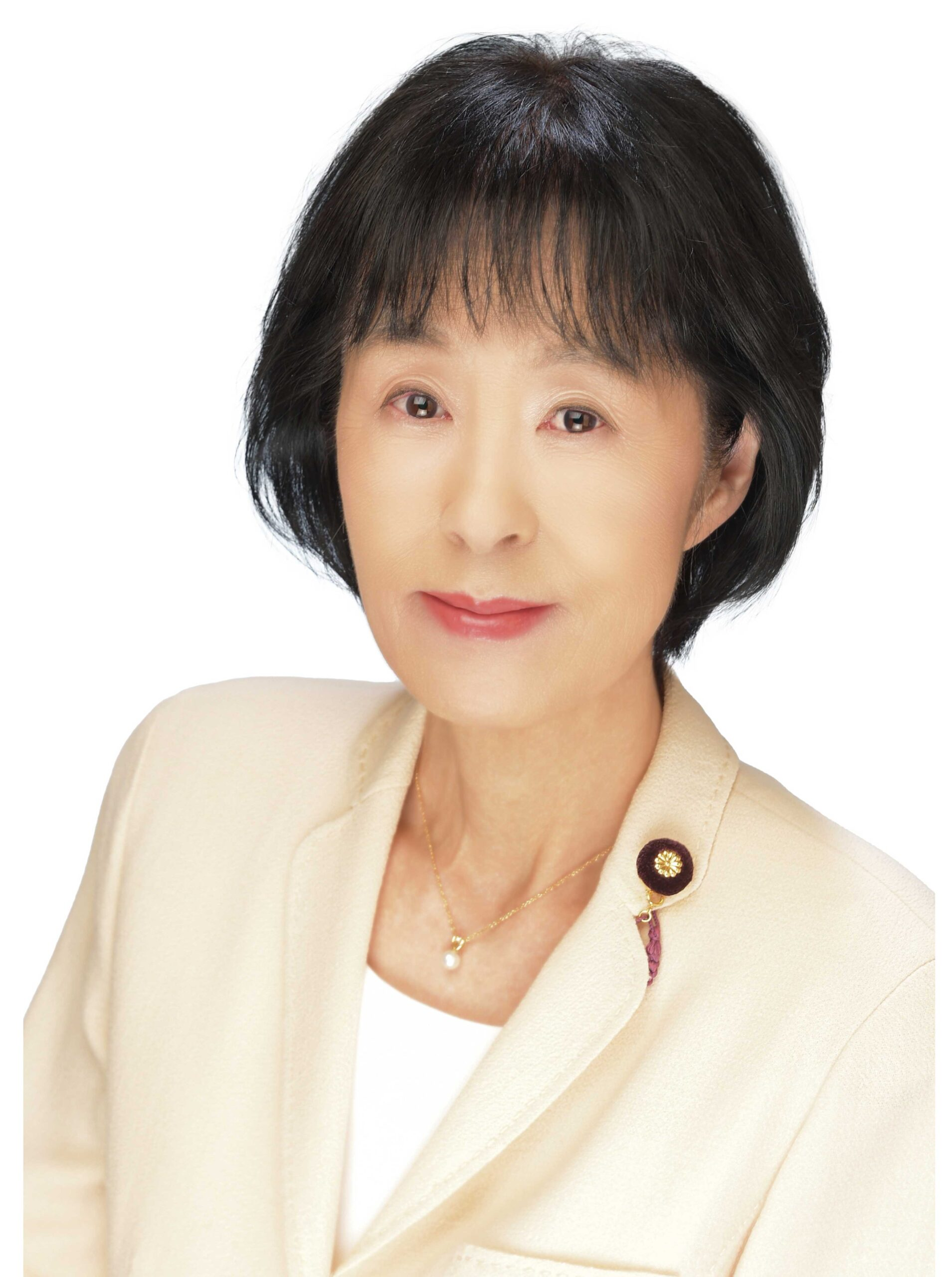
- Official portrait, 2025

Member of the House of Councillors
- Incumbent
- Assumed office 29 July 2019
- Preceded by: Chūichi Date
- Constituency: Hokkaido at-large

6th Governor of Hokkaido
- In office 23 April 2003 – 22 April 2019
- Monarch: Akihito
- Preceded by: Tatsuya Hori
- Succeeded by: Naomichi Suzuki

Personal details
- Born: 6 January 1954 (age 72) Toyama City, Toyama, Japan
- Party: Liberal Democratic
- Relatives: Hachiro Nitta (brother)
- Education: Hitotsubashi University

Harumi Takahashi (高橋 はるみ, Takahashi Harumi; born 6 January 1954) is a Japanese politician of the Liberal Democratic Party and currently a member of the House of Councillors in the Diet (national legislature).

== Early life ==
Takahashi was born in Toyama City, Toyama, in 1954.

She graduated from Hitotsubashi University with a Bachelor of Economics degree in 1976. After university, she started her career as a bureaucrat in the Ministry of Economy, Trade and Industry. In 2001 she was appointed director of the Hokkaido Bureau of Economy Trade and Industry, a position she held until she quit in 2003 to run for Governor of Hokkaido.

== Political career ==
=== Hokkaido governorship ===
Takahashi was elected Governor of Hokkaido Prefecture in April 2003, winning with 750,000 votes in a field of nine candidates. In winning, she became the first female governor of Hokkaido and the fourth female governor in Japanese history. She served as governor for four terms from 2003 to 2019.

The year after she was first elected, Takahashi was diagnosed with stomach cancer. Cancer diagnoses usually spell the end to political careers in Japan, so they are often hidden. Instead, Takahashi publicly announced he diagnosis, and her intention to have treatment in Hokkaido rather than seeking private treatment in a Tokyo clinic.

In 2007 she was reelected for her second term, increasing the number of votes she received to over 2 million.

In her 2011 reelection, Takahashi won victory in every constituency in Hokkaido.

Takahashi was reelected for her fourth term in 2015, the first time a governor has been elected four times as Governor of Hokkaido. She retired at the end of her fourth term in 2019.

==== Achievements as governor ====
During her terms, Takahashi focused on revitalising the Hokkaido economy through increasing local food production and incoming tourist numbers. Her local food policies encouraged more and higher value farm production, and local consumption of local products. During her tenure, the percentage of Hokkaido produced food consumed by Hokkaido residents rose from 60 percent to 80 percent, and exports to other areas of Japan and overseas also increased.

Takahashi's tourism policies involved increasing connections and flights to New Chitose Airport, and attracting visitors from Asia, especially China and Korea. By the end of her tenure, overseas visitors to Hokkaido made up 10 percent of all overseas visitors to Japan.

=== House of Councillors ===
In 2019 Takahashi stepped down of Governor of Hokkaido, and ran for the Hokkaido seat in the House of Councillors (the upper house in Japan's national legislature), winning the seat and joining the Hosoda faction of the LDP. She is still serving as the Hokkaido member as of July 2025.

== Family ==
Takahashi's Grandfather Takekuni Takaysuji was a two-term Governor of Toyama Pefecture.

Takahashi's younger brother, Hachiro Nitta is the current two-term Governor of Toyama Prefecture.

Political offices
Preceded by Chūichi Date	Member of the House of Councillors for Hokkaido; 2019–present	Incumbent
Preceded by Tatsuya Hori	Governor of Hokkaido; 2003–2019	Succeeded by Naomichi Suzuki
