= Gi!nz =

Japanese band

- Genres: New music
- Years active: 1997–present
- Members: Yoshimasa Hayashi; Hachiro Okonogi; Yasukazu Hamada; Masaji Matsuyama
- Past members: Ichita Yamamoto; Gaku Ishizaki

Gi!nz (Japanese: ギインズ, Hepburn: Ginzu) is a Japanese band composed of members of the Liberal Democratic Party in the National Diet.

== History ==
Gi!nz was formed by Yoshimasa Hayashi, who would later become the Chief Cabinet Secretary, and Ichita Yamamoto in May 1997. Hayashi served as the leader, serving as the band's vocals, guitar, and piano. He is also in charged with writing lyrics and composing music. The band was inspired by The Beatles and based on 1970s new music genre. The band was created because "young people are said to be apathetic towards politics" and "When a message is delivered on the tune of upbeat pop or rock melodies, it is reborn and can be shared with many people".

The band became a four-member band when Yasukazu Hamada, Hachiro Okonogi, and Gaku Ishizaki joined the band. After losing his seat in the 2000 Japanese general election, Ishizaki left the band and was replaced by Masaji Matsuyama. The band was then composed of incumbent Liberal Democratic Party members of the National Diet. They released their first CD album in January 2005, with a portion of the proceeds donated to the Japan Marrow Donor Program. Their second CD album was released in January 2018.

== Musical style ==
According to Jiji Press, the defining characteristics of their songs were their social message.

== Live performances ==
They typically performed on disaster-stricken area to raised money as a charity concerts. They also performed in a charity event on February 23, 2005, in Nagatachō. They performed live on December 25, 2013, and November 6, 2014, which is a charity concerts for the victims of the 2014 Mount Ontake eruption, performing their song "Tokyo Sotsugyō" in English. Their last performance before the COVID-19 pandemic in Japan hits was in 2019. Although they planned to have a year-end concert in Tokyo on December 30, 2023, it was cancelled following the slush fund scandal in 2023.

== Members ==
- Yoshimasa Hayashi (Yamaguchi 3rd) – vocalist, guitar and piano.
- Hachiro Okonogi (Kanagawa 3rd – former) – vocalist
- Yasukazu Hamada (Chiba 12th) – vocalist
- Masaji Matsuyama (House of Councillors; Fukuoka at-large) – guitar, vocalist

=== Former ===
- Ichita Yamamoto (House of Councillors; Gunma at-large – former; 1997–1998)
- Gaku Ishizaki (Hokkaido 3rd – former; 1998–2000)

== Discography ==
Album title	Release date
Gi!nz First Album (ギインズ・ファースト・アルバム)	January 21, 2005
Gi!nz 2018	January 19, 2019
