= Takahiro Yokomichi =

Japanese politician (1941–2023)

- 横路 孝弘
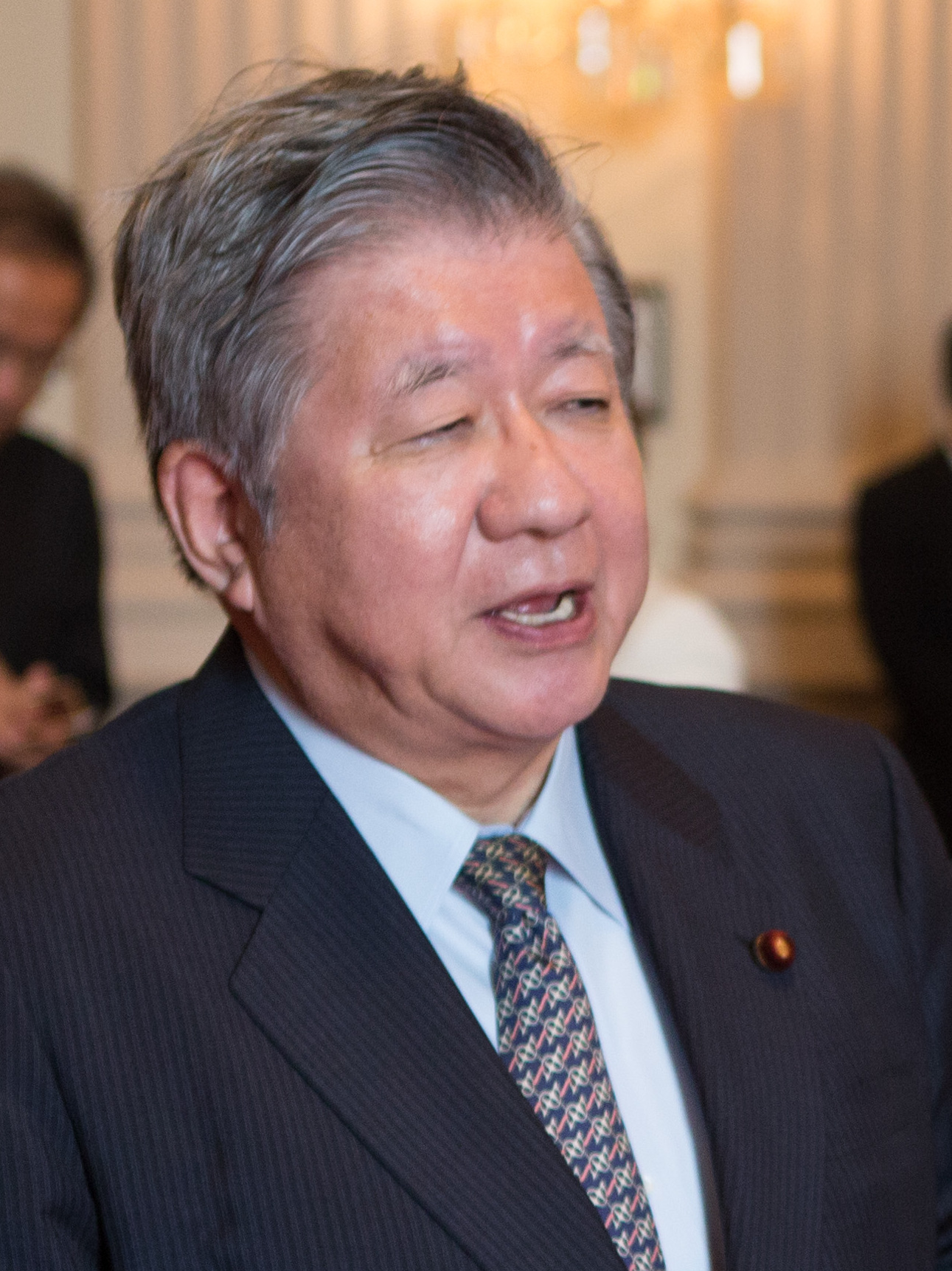
- Yokomichi in 2012

Speaker of the House of Representatives
- In office 16 September 2009 – 16 November 2012
- Monarch: Akihito
- Deputy: Seishirō Etō
- Preceded by: Yōhei Kōno
- Succeeded by: Bunmei Ibuki

Vice Speaker of the House of Representatives
- In office 21 September 2005 – 21 July 2009
- Speaker: Yōhei Kōno
- Preceded by: Kansei Nakano
- Succeeded by: Seishirō Etō

4th Governor of Hokkaido
- In office 23 April 1983 – 22 April 1995
- Monarchs: Hirohito; Akihito
- Preceded by: Naohiro Dōgakinai
- Succeeded by: Tatsuya Hori

Member of the House of Representatives
- In office 7 November 1996 – 28 September 2017
- Preceded by: Constituency established
- Succeeded by: Daiki Michishita
- Constituency: Hokkaido 1st (1996–2012); Hokkaido PR (2012–2014); Hokkaido 1st (2014–2017)
- In office 27 December 1969 – 23 April 1983
- Preceded by: Setsuo Yokomichi
- Succeeded by: Yasuko Takemura
- Constituency: Hokkaido 1st

Personal details
- Born: 3 January 1941 Sapporo, Hokkaido, Japan
- Died: 2 February 2023 (aged 82) Tokyo, Japan
- Party: CDP (2017–2023)
- Other political affiliations: JSP (1969–1983); Independent (1983–1996); DP 1996 (1996–1998); DPJ (1998–2016); DP 2016 (2016–2017)
- Parent: Setsuo Yokomichi (father)
- Education: University of Tokyo
- Website: Official website

Takahiro Yokomichi (横路 孝弘, Yokomichi Takahiro; 3 January 1941 – 2 February 2023) was a Japanese politician who belonged to the Democratic Party of Japan (DPJ) and was a member of the House of Representatives in the Diet (national legislature). A native of Sapporo, Hokkaidō, and graduate of the University of Tokyo, he was elected to the first of his five terms in the House of Representatives in 1969 as a member of the Japan Socialist Party in the electoral district of his late father Setsuo. He left the House of Representatives and was elected to be the Governor of Hokkaidō. He served for three terms from 1983 to 1995. After finishing his term as governor, he left the Socialist Party, joining the DPJ. In 1996 he was re-elected to the House of Representatives. He was the leader of the most left-leaning faction in the DPJ. After the victory of 2009 elections, then-DPJ President Yukio Hatoyama named him as the next house speaker.

In the 2012 general election Yokomichi lost his single-seat electorate but retained a seat in the Diet through the proportional representation system. He managed to regain his seat in the 2014 election and held it until he retired in 2017.

House of Representatives (Japan)
New district	Representative for Hokkaidō 1st district (single-member); 1996–2012	Succeeded by Toshimitsu Funahashi
Preceded by Eight representatives elected by proportional representation	One of eight representatives for Hokkaidō proportional representation block (PR); 2012–2014	Succeeded by Eight representatives elected by proportional representation
Preceded by Tohsimitsu Funahashi	Representative for Hokkaidō 1st district (single-member); 2014–2017	Succeeded by Daiki Michishita
Preceded by vacancy created by Setsuo Yokomichi; Torazō Shimamoto...	Representative for Hokkaidō 1st district 1969–1983; Served alongside: Usaburō Chisaki III, Noboru Minowa, ....	Succeeded by Nobutaka Machimura...
Preceded by Yōhei Kōno	President of the House of Representatives; 2009–2012	Succeeded by Bunmei Ibuki
Preceded by Kansei Nakano	Vice-President of the House of Representatives; 2005–2009	Succeeded by Seishirō Etō
Political offices
Preceded by Naohiro Dōgakinai	Governor of Hokkaido; 1983–1995	Succeeded by Tatsuya Hori
