= Yokomichi =

Yokomichi (written: 横路) is a Japanese surname. Notable people with the surname include:

- Setsuo Yokomichi (横路 節雄, 1911–1967), Japanese politician
- Takahiro Yokomichi (横路 孝弘, 1941–2023), Japanese politician
