= Niizuma =

Niizuma (written: 新妻 lit. "new wife") is a Japanese surname. Notable people with the surname include:

- Hideki Niizuma (新妻 秀規, born 1970), Japanese politician
- Ito Niizuma (新妻 イト, 1890–1963), Japanese politician
- Minoru Niizuma (新妻 実, 1930–1998), Japanese sculptor
- Seiko Niizuma (新妻 聖子, born 1980), Japanese actress and singer
