= Satoshi Arai =

Japanese politician

- 荒井 聰
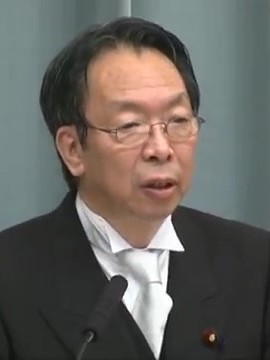
- Arai in 2010

Member of the House of Representatives
- In office 31 August 2009 – 31 October 2021
- Preceded by: Gaku Ishizaki
- Succeeded by: Hirohisa Takagi
- Constituency: Hokkaido 3rd (2009–2012); Hokkaido PR (2012–2017); Hokkaido 3rd (2017–2021)
- In office 25 June 2000 – 16 March 2007
- Preceded by: Gaku Ishizaki
- Succeeded by: Tomohiro Ishikawa
- Constituency: Hokkaido 3rd (2000–2005); Hokkaido PR (2005–2007)
- In office 18 July 1993 – 27 September 1996
- Preceded by: Kenji Kodama
- Succeeded by: Constituency abolished
- Constituency: Hokkaido 1st

Personal details
- Born: 27 May 1946 (age 80) Tōbetsu, Hokkaido, Japan
- Party: CDP (since 2017)
- Other political affiliations: JNP (1993–1994); NPS (1994–1996); DP 1996 (1996–1998); DPJ (1998–2016); DP 2016 (2016–2017)
- Children: Yutaka Arai
- Education: University of Tokyo
- Website: Official website

Satoshi Arai (荒井 聰, Arai Satoshi; born 27 May 1946) is a Japanese politician of the Constitutional Democratic Party of Japan and a former member of the House of Representatives in the Diet (national legislature).

== Career ==
A native of Tōbetsu, Hokkaido and graduate of the University of Tokyo, he was elected to the House of Representatives for the first time in 1993. Arai had worked in the Ministry of Foreign Affairs and in the office of former Governor of Hokkaido Takahiro Yokomichi, before resigning in 1993 to run in that year's general election. Arai managed to win a seat in his native Hokkaido and entered the House of Representatives, marking the start of his political career. A liberal politician, Arai has always been affiliated with centre-left parties, even in the turbulent Japanese political landscape where parties boom and bust and alliances change often.

Arai lost in his first contest for the Hokkaido 3rd district in 1996, but won the district in 2000. Since then, Arai would win another three times (2003, 2009 and 2017) and lost three times (2005, 2012 and 2014) in this seat. As his vote share was still considerably high in the races he lost, he always managed to return to the diet via the PR list.

Arai had run in a seat outside the Diet once. He quit his seat mid-term in 2007 to run for the 2007 Hokkaido gubernatorial election against incumbent Harumi Takahashi, but lost. Two years outside Parliament, he ran again in his old seat in 2009, defeating incumbent Gaku Ishizaki by a large margin in an election that brought his party into government. Subsequent Prime Ministers Yukio Hatoyama and Naoto Kan would bring Arai into their administrations. He served as a Special Adviser in the Hatoyama government and Minister of State in the Kan government. After leaving the Cabinet, Arai served in several Diet committees.

Arai is also a staunch opponent of the closures of JR Hokkaido's local routes. In 2016, he led a pressure campaign against the closure, forcing Governor Takahashi to launch a review into the policy.

In June 2021 he announced his retirement from politics. His son, Yutaka Arai, unsuccessfully ran for his old seat in the 2021 elections, but won a seat in the Hokkaido proportional representation block.
