= Usaburō Chisaki II =

Japanese businessman and politician

- 地崎 宇三郎

Member of the House of Representatives
- In office 11 April 1946 – 9 January 1947
- Preceded by: Constituency established
- Succeeded by: Constituency abolished
- Constituency: Hokkaido 1st

Personal details
- Born: 2 January 1897 Sapporo, Hokkaido, Japan
- Died: 29 June 1951 (aged 54)
- Party: Democratic
- Other political affiliations: Progressive (1946–1947)
- Children: Usaburō Chisaki III

Usaburō Chisaki II (Japanese: 地崎宇三郎 (二代); 2 January 1897 – 29 June 1951) was a Japanese businessman and politician. He was a member of the House of Representatives of Japan under the Empire of Japan. He was the father of Usaburō Chisaki III.

== Career ==
In 1939, he became vice president of the Sapporo Civil Engineering and Construction Association, and in 1941, vice board chairman of the Hokkaido Civil Engineering and Construction Association. After the end of the war, he entered politics and formed the Hokkaido Political League. During 1946 Japanese general election, he ran a campaign for and won Hokkaido's 1st district. The Hokkaido Political League would work to form a coalition with the Japan Progressive Party (later the Democratic Party), finding itself a key figure in the formation of the Katayama Cabinet. Eventually Chisaki would become chief secretary of the Democratic Party, but just five days after appointment he would be purged as a result of the Allied Occupation of Japan

From 1947 until his death, he lived in Tokyo as chairman of Chizaki Group. His public service purge was lifted in 1950. Chisaki died on 29 June 1951 at the age of 54.

== Works ==
- 『間宮海峡埋立論』（北方文化出版社, 1946年）

== Bibliography ==
- 高木正雄『北海道建設人物事典』（自費出版, 2008年）
