= Toyama Atsuko =

Japanese ambassador and bureaucrat

- 遠山 敦子
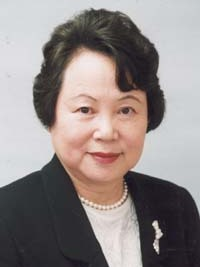
- Official portrait, 2001

Minister of Education, Culture, Sports, Science and Technology
- In office 26 April 2001 – 22 September 2003
- Prime Minister: Junichiro Koizumi
- Preceded by: Nobutaka Machimura
- Succeeded by: Takeo Kawamura

Personal details
- Born: 10 December 1938 (age 87) Kuwana, Mie, Japan
- Party: Independent
- Education: University of Tokyo

Tōyama Atsuko (遠山 敦子; born 10 December 1938) is a Japanese former bureaucrat in the Ministry of Education, Culture, Sport, Science, and Technology. She is a trustee of the Tokyo Organizing Committee of the Olympic and Paralympic Games, and the head of the Mt. Fuji World Heritage Center in Shizuoka.

== Early life and education ==
Toyama was born in Kuwana, Mie, Japan. She grew up in Shizuoka. She graduated from Tokyo University.

== Career ==
After graduation in 1962 Toyama joined the Ministry of Education, Culture, Sport, Science, and Technology. She was one of the first women to become a bureaucrat there, rising quickly to head departments and bureaus. She worked mostly in higher education, and became the director-general of the higher education bureau. After leaving government work, she became the ambassador to Turkey in June 1996 and the director of the National Museum of Western Art in April 2000.

Toyama was the Minister of Education, Culture, Sport, Science, and Technology in the first Koizumi Cabinet in 2001. She worked there for two and a half years, until 2003. During her tenure Toyama released a plan to reform Japan's national universities by reorganizing internal structures and make thirty of Japan's universities "world-class". There were also changes to how researchers obtain funding, including the newly established "Centers of Excellence", which made academic departments compete for funding. The "Toyama plan" was built on work that she had done during her previous government work.

Toyama was the president of the New National Theater Foundation, the Toyota Foundation, the Panasonic Foundation and the Japan Ikebana Art Association. Toyama also taught at the National Institution for Academic Degrees and Quality Enhancement of Higher Education and the International Research Center for Japanese Studies.

In April 2013 Toyama was awarded the Grand Cordon of the Rising Sun.

In 2017 she became the head of the Mt. Fuji World Heritage Center in Shizuoka. Toyama is also a trustee of the Tokyo Organizing Committee of the Olympic and Paralympic Games.

== Selected bibliography ==
- Toyama, Atsuko (2013). Koshikata no ki : Hitosuji no michi o ayunde gojunen. Kamakurashunjusha. ISBN 9784774005942. OCLC 848060489.]
- Tōyama, Atsuko (2004). Kō kawaru gakkō kō kawaru daigaku. Tōkyō: Kōdansha. ISBN 4062123215. OCLC 55864164.
- Toyama, Atsuko (2001). Toruko seiki no hazama de. 日本放送出版協会. ISBN 4140806494. OCLC 675831637.

Political offices
Preceded by Nobutaka Machimura	Minister of Education, Culture, Sports, Science and Technology of Japan; 2001	Succeeded by Takeo Kawamura
