= Hokkaido 1st district (1947–1993) =

Former Japan House of Representatives constituency

Hokkaidō 1st District
- 北海道第1区
- Former constituency for the Japanese House of Representatives
- District: Hokkaidō

Former constituency
- Created: 1947
- Abolished: 1994
- Number of members: 6
- Replaced by: Hokkaido 1st, 2nd, 3rd, 4th, and 5th

The Hokkaido 1st District (Japanese: 北海道第1区, Hepburn: Hokkaidō dai ichi-ku) is a former constituency for the House of Representatives between the 1947 and 1993 elections. It was abolished following the 1994 electoral reform when Japan moved from single non-transferable vote to a parallel system.

Comprising Sapporo, Chitose, Otaru, Ebetsu, and surrounds, at the final election it existed for in 1993, it had 1,805,093 registered electors. The area which was Hokkaido 1st is now represented by 5 single member constituencies, Hokkaidō 1st district, Hokkaidō 2nd district, Hokkaidō 3rd district, Hokkaidō 4th district, and Hokkaidō 5th district.

== List of representatives ==
Election	Elected 1st	2nd	3rd	4th	5th	6th
1947	Hidetoshi Tomabechi (LP, DLP)	Saburō Shiikuma (DP)	Kiyoshi Masaki (JSP)	Kazuo Sakai (JSP)	Masanobu Ogawara (LP)	
1949	Hidetoshi Tomabechi (LP, DLP)	Hidejirō Uno (DLP)	Masanobu Ogawara (DLP)	Saburō Shiikuma (DP)	Tetsuo Uraguchi (RYK)	
1952	Saburō Shiikuma (Kaishintō)	Setsuo Yokomichi (LSP)	Kingo Machimura (Kaishintō)	Yoshitomo Susukida (LP)	Kiyoshi Masaki (LSP)	
1953	Hidetoshi Tomabechi (LP)	Setsuo Yokomichi (LSP)	Kiyoshi Masaki (LSP, JSP)	Saburō Shiikuma (Kaishintō)	Kingo Machimura (Kaishintō)	
1955	Setsuo Yokomichi (LSP, JSP)	Saburō Shiikuma (JDP)	Kiyoshi Masaki (LSP, JSP)	Yoshitomo Susukida (LP)	Kingo Machimura (Ind)	
1958	Setsuo Yokomichi (LSP, JSP)	Kingo Machimura (LDP)	Kiyoshi Masaki (LSP, JSP)	Saburō Shiikuma (LDP)	Yoshitomo Susukida (LDP)	
1960	Setsuo Yokomichi (LSP, JSP)	Tomiyo Takada (LDP)	Saburō Shiikuma (LDP)	Torazō Shimamoto (JSP)	Shōichi Suhara (Ind, LDP)	
1963	Usaburō Chisaki III (LDP)	Setsuo Yokomichi (JSP)	Saburō Shiikuma (LDP)	Yasuo Tomariya (JSP)	Shōichi Suhara (Ind, LDP)	
1967	Setsuo Yokomichi (JSP)	Torazō Shimamoto (JSP)	Usaburō Chisaki III (LDP)	Noboru Minowa (LDP)	Minoru Saitō (KP)	
1969	Usaburō Chisaki III (LDP)	Takahiro Yokomichi (JSP)	Minoru Saitō (KP)	Noboru Minowa (LDP)	Torazō Shimamoto (JSP)	
1972	Torazō Shimamoto (JSP)	Mitsuo Tada (JCP)	Noboru Minowa (LDP)	Takahiro Yokomichi (JSP)	Usaburō Chisaki III (LDP)	
1976	Takahiro Yokomichi (JSP)	Usaburō Chisaki III (LDP)	Minoru Saitō (KP)	Torazō Shimamoto (JSP)	Noboru Minowa (LDP)	
1979	Takahiro Yokomichi (JSP)	Usaburō Chisaki III (LDP)	Mitsuo Tada (JCP)	Noboru Minowa (LDP)	Minoru Saitō (KP)	
1980	Usaburō Chisaki III (LDP)	Noboru Minowa (LDP)	Tsuneto Kobayashi (JSP)	Takahiro Yokomichi (JSP)	Minoru Saitō (KP)	
1983	Yasuko Takemura (Ind)	Nobutaka Machimura (LDP)	Minoru Saitō (KP)	Tsuneto Kobayashi (JSP)	Noboru Minowa (LDP)	
1986	Nobutaka Machimura (LDP)	Tsuneto Kobayashi (JSP)	Shizuo Satō (LDP)	Fusao Fujiwara (KP)	Noboru Minowa (LDP)	Kenji Kodama (JCP)
1990	Hideko Itō (JSP)	Tsuneto Kobayashi (JSP)	Akira Matsūra (LDP)	Nobutaka Machimura (LDP)	Kenji Kodama (JCP)	Fusao Fujiwara (KP)
1993	Nobutaka Machimura (LDP)	Junichi Osanai (KP)	Hideko Itō (JSP)	Satoshi Arai (NP)	Shizuo Satō (LDP)	Ryōichi Ikeda (JSP)

== Election results ==
Vote share of parties in Hokkaido 1st District from 1947 to 1993.

=== Elections in the 1990s ===
1993: Hokkaido 1st (6 Members)
Party	Candidate	Votes	%	±%
LDP	Nobutaka Machimura	186,192	15.73	▲2.68
Kōmeitō	Junichi Osanai	171,089	14.45	▲2.12
Socialist	Hideko Itō	160,629	13.57	▼8.4
New Party	Satoshi Arai	137,014	11.57	new
LDP	Shizuo Satō	133,465	11.27	▼1.78
Socialist	Ryōichi Ikeda	132,812	11.22	▼3.76
JCP	Kenji Kodama	125,643	10.61	▼2.3
Shinseito	Tomoko Matsūra	77,837	6.57	new
LDP	Shōzen Kanaishi	28,561	2.41	▼7.19
Independent	Kenichi Sawada	14,149	1.20	new
Independent	Yasuhiko Abe	11,336	0.96	▼1.14
Independent	Kagisaburō Kobayashi	5,232	0.44	new
Turnout		1,183,949	66.29	▼5.27
Registered electors		1,805,093		

1990: Hokkaido 1st (6 Members)
Party	Candidate	Votes	%	±%
Socialist	Hideko Itō	261,170	21.97	new
Socialist	Tsuneto Kobayashi	178,130	14.98	▼0.61
LDP	Akira Matsūra	155,264	13.06	new
LDP	Nobutaka Machimura	155,142	13.05	▼2.9
JCP	Kenji Kodama	153,527	12.91	▲0.08
Kōmeitō	Fusao Fujiwara	146,626	12.33	▼2.07
LDP	Shizuo Satō	114,081	9.60	▼5.16
Independent	Yasuhiko Abe	24,967	2.10	new
Turnout		1,196,435	71.56	▲3.99
Registered electors		1,671,934		

=== Elections in the 1980s ===
1986: Hokkaido 1st (6 Members)
Party	Candidate	Votes	%	±%
LDP	Nobutaka Machimura	165,041	15.95	▼1.95
Socialist	Tsuneto Kobayashi	161,293	15.59	▲0.94
LDP	Shizuo Satō	152,709	14.76	▲5.66
Kōmeitō	Fusao Fujiwara	149,036	14.40	▼1.28
LDP	Noburu Minowa	142,311	13.75	▲1.77
JCP	Kenji Kodama	132,789	12.83	▲1.45
Independent	Yasuko Takemura	131,560	12.71	▼6.58
Turnout		1,034,739	67.57	▲2.66
Registered electors		1,553,497		

1983: Hokkaido 1st (5 members)
Party	Candidate	Votes	%	±%
Independent	Yasuko Takemura	185,161	19.29	new
LDP	Nobutaka Machimura	171,814	17.90	
Kōmeitō	Minoru Saitō	150,502	15.68	▲1.63
Socialist	Tsuneto Kobayashi	140,623	14.65	▼2.23
LDP	Noboru Minowa	114,980	11.98	▼5.24
JCP	Kenji Kodama	109,206	11.38	▼1.79
LDP	Shizuo Satō	87,377	9.10	
Turnout			64.91	▼5.56
Registered electors		1,487,960		

1980: Hokkaido 1st (5 members)
Party	Candidate	Votes	%	±%
LDP	Usaburō Chisaki III	186,329	19.52	▲2.84
LDP	Noboru Minowa	164,389	17.22	▲1.88
Socialist	Tsuneto Kobayashi	161,142	16.88	▲3.16
Socialist	Takahiro Yokomichi	152,850	16.01	▼3.23
Kōmeitō	Minoru Saitō	134,058	14.05	▼0.89
JCP	Mitsuo Tada	125,714	13.17	▼2.62
New Liberal Club	Satoru Tsuchiya	24,796	2.60	▼1.22
Japan Labor Party	Kiyofumi Namerikawa	3,773	0.40	▼0.06
Independent	Toyoharu Okita	1,423	0.15	
Turnout			70.47	▲3.41
Registered electors		1,373,661		

=== Elections in the 1970s ===
1979: Hokkaido 1st (5 members)
Party	Candidate	Votes	%	±%
Socialist	Takahiro Yokomichi	172,598	19.24	▲3.58
LDP	Usaburō Chisaki III	149,587	16.68	▲1.36
JCP	Mitsuo Tada	141,609	15.79	▲3.51
LDP	Noboru Minowa	137,608	15.34	▲2.31
Kōmeitō	Minoru Saitō	134,000	14.94	Steady
Socialist	Tsuneto Kobayashi	123,052	13.72	new
New Liberal Club	Satoru Tsuchiya	34,261	3.82	new
Japan Labor Party	Kiyofumi Namerikawa	4,136	0.46	new
Turnout			67.06	▼6.99
Registered electors		1,348,759		

1976: Hokkaido 1st 5 members
Party	Candidate	Votes	%	±%
Socialist	Takahiro Yokomichi	146,400	15.66	▲1.81
LDP	Usaburō Chisaki III	143,201	15.32	▲2.76
Kōmeitō	Minoru Saitō	139,554	14.93	▲4.23
Socialist	Torazō Shimamoto	129,889	13.89	▼3.87
LDP	Noboru Minowa	121,818	13.03	▼1.35
JCP	Mitsuo Tada	114,840	12.28	▼2.65
Democratic Socialist	Aiko Takasaki	60,784	6.50	▼0.45
Independent	Shinichi Nishimura	50,612	5.41	new
Independent	Masahiro Kishida	24,298	2.60	new
Independent	Noboru Itagaki	3,601	0.39	new
Turnout			74.05	▲2.38
Registered electors		1,272,490		

1972: Hokkaido 1st 5 members
Party	Candidate	Votes	%	±%
Socialist	Torazō Shimamoto	142,641	17.76	▲8.33
JCP	Mitsuo Tada	119,946	14.93	▲7.72
LDP	Noboru Minowa	115,536	14.38	▲1.91
Socialist	Takahiro Yokomichi	111,244	13.85	▼1.66
LDP	Usaburō Chisaki III	100,931	12.56	▼2.95
Kōmeitō	Minoru Saitō	85,978	10.70	▼3.22
Independent	Shōichi Suhara	71,189	8.86	▼0.06
Democratic Socialist	Michirō Minami	55,853	6.95	▲0.56
Turnout			71.67	▲7.56
Registered electors		1,128,968		

=== Elections in the 1960s ===
1969: Hokkaido 1st 5 members
Party	Candidate	Votes	%	±%
LDP	Usaburō Chisaki III	100,799	15.51	▲3.01
Socialist	Takahiro Yokomichi	98,829	15.21	▼0.39
Kōmeitō	Minoru Saitō	90,453	13.92	▲2.12
LDP	Noboru Minowa	81,008	12.47	▲0.47
Socialist	Torazō Shimamoto	61,271	9.43	▼5.37
Independent	Shōichi Suhara	57,986	8.92	▼2.38
Socialist	Yasuo Tomariya	54,867	8.44	▼2.96
JCP	Eiji Arai	46,867	7.21	▲3.71
Democratic Socialist	Michirō Minami	41,538	6.39	new
Independent	Shinichiro Nakayama	15,735	2.42	new
Rikken Yōseikai	Shinichi Hashino	448	0.07	new
Turnout			64.11	▼10.69
Registered electors		1,020,020		

1967: Hokkaido 1st 5 members
Party	Candidate	Votes	%	±%
Socialist	Setsuo Yokomichi	100,563	15.6	▼4.2
Socialist	Torazō Shimamoto	95,701	14.8	▲2.0
LDP	Usaburō Chisaki III	80,269	12.5	▼7.7
LDP	Noboru Minowa	77,496	12.0	new
Kōmeitō	Minoru Saitō	76,176	11.8	new
Socialist	Yasuo Tomariya	73,649	11.4	▼2.4
LDP	Shōichi Suhara	72,607	11.3	▼2.5
Independent	Masao Shiikuma	41,233	6.4	new
JCP	Eiji Arai	22,281	3.5	▲1.2
Independent	Hiroshi Maetani	4,664	0.7	new
Turnout			74.80	▲9.84
Registered electors		869,569		

1963: Hokkaido 1st 5 members
Party	Candidate	Votes	%	±%
LDP	Usaburō Chisaki III	93,915	20.2	new
Socialist	Setsuo Yokomichi	91,817	19.8	▲0.3
LDP	Saburō Shiikuma	76,922	16.6	▲2.4
Socialist	Yasuo Tomariya	64,215	13.8	new
LDP	Shōichi Suhara	64,000	13.8	▲1.9
Socialist	Torazō Shimamoto	63,079	13.6	new
JCP	Eiji Arai	10,640	2.3	▲0.8
Turnout			64.96	▼1.93
Registered electors		721,521		

1960: Hokkaido 1st District 5 members
Party	Candidate	Votes	%	±%
Socialist	Setsuo Yokomichi	83,138	19.5	▼4.7
LDP	Tomiyo Takada	72,521	17.0	new
LDP	Saburō Shiikuma	60,494	14.2	▼3.2
Socialist	Torazō Shimamoto	53,422	12.5	new
Independent	Shōichi Suhara	50,893	11.9	new
Socialist	Kiyoshi Masaki	47,628	11.2	▼7.6
Independent	Noboru Minowa	39,940	9.4	new
Democratic Socialist	Kunihiro Watanabe	12,640	3.0	new
JCP	Nishidate Jin	6,274	1.5	▼1.1
Turnout			66.89	▲3.92
Registered electors		642,389		

=== Elections in the 1950s ===
1959 By-Election: Hokkaido 1st District 2 members
Party	Candidate	Votes	%	±%
Socialist	Setsuo Yokomichi	160,215	53.5	n/a
LDP	Tomiyo Takada	133,632	44.7	n/a
JCP	Nishidate Jin	4,860	1.6	n/a
Independent	Tōru Higo	565	0.2	n/a
Turnout			48.08	▼14.89

1958: Hokkaido 1st District 5 members
Party	Candidate	Votes	%	±%
Socialist	Setsuo Yokomichi	90,624	24.2	▲5.1
LDP	Kingo Machimura	82,480	22.0	▲9.1
Socialist	Kiyoshi Masaki	70,669	18.8	▲5.1
LDP	Saburō Shiikuma	65,230	17.4	▲3.0
LDP	Yoshitomo Susukida	48,646	13.0	Steady
JCP	Nishidate Jin	9,731	2.6	▲0.2
Independent	Seiji Takai	7,850	2.1	▲1.1
Turnout			62.97	▼9.59
Registered electors		599,584		

1955: Hokkaido 1st District 5 members
Party	Candidate	Votes	%	±%
Left Socialist	Setsuo Yokomichi	75,389	19.1	▲4.8
Democratic	Saburō Shiikuma	56,970	14.4	▲3.3
Left Socialist	Kiyoshi Masaki	54,022	13.7	▲0.2
Liberal	Yoshitomo Susukida	51,517	13.0	▲2.0
Independent	Kingo Machimura	50,963	12.9	▲1.9
Democratic	Hidejirō Uno	37,842	9.6	▲4.9
Liberal	Hidetoshi Tomabechi	37,116	9.4	▼7.3
Right Socialist	Chiaki Kunio	17,829	4.5	▼1.2
JCP	Shunji Hiroya	9,432	2.4	▼0.4
Independent	Seiji Takai	4,109	1.0	new
Turnout			72.56	▲3.54
Registered electors		547,797		

1953: Hokkaido 1st District 5 members
Party	Candidate	Votes	%	±%
Liberal	Hidetoshi Tomabechi	56,747	16.7	▲7.8
Left Socialist	Setsuo Yokomichi	48,513	14.3	▼0.4
Left Socialist	Kiyoshi Massaki	45,835	13.5	▲2.8
Kaishintō	Sauburō Shiikuma	37,877	11.1	▼3.8
Kaishintō	Kingo Machimura	37,573	11.0	▼1.9
Liberal	Yoshitomo Susukida	37,318	11.0	▲0.2
Liberal	Masaichi Iwamoto	30,973	9.1	▲0.2
Right Socialist	Masashi Saito	19,587	5.7	▲0.7
Liberal Party–Hatoyama	Hidejirō Uno	16,151	4.7	▼2.3
JCP	Shunichi Suginohara	9,538	2.8	▼0.2
Turnout			69.02	▲1.99
Registered electors		496,056		

1952: Hokkaido 1st District 5 members
Party	Candidate	Votes	%	±%
Kaishintō	Saburō Shiikuma	49,645	14.9	▲5.6
Left Socialist	Setsuo Yokomichi	48,826	14.7	▲7.3
Kaishintō	Kingo Machimura	42,815	12.9	new
Liberal	Yoshitomo Susukida	36,041	10.8	new
Left Socialist	Kiyoshi Masaki	35,777	10.7	▲4.3
Liberal	Hidetoshi Tomabechi	29,599	8.9	▼4.2
Liberal	Masaichi Iwamoto	29,546	8.9	new
Liberal	Hidejirō Uno	23,458	7.0	▼4.5
Right Socialist	Izumi Mori	16,558	5	▲0.7
Rikken Yōseikai	Tetsuo Uraguchi	10,523	3.2	▼5.4
JCP	Shunichi Suginohara	10,023	3.0	▼2.6
Turnout			67.03	▲5.59
Registered electors		501,180		

=== Elections in the 1940s ===
1949: Hokkaido 1st District 5 members
Party	Candidate	Votes	%	±%
Democratic Liberal	Hidetoshi Tomabechi	33,915	13.1	▼5.5
Democratic Liberal	Hidejirō Uno	29,662	11.5	new
Democratic Liberal	Masanobu Ogawara	28,580	11.1	▲3.3
Democratic	Saburō Shiikuma	23,970	9.3	▼4.5
Rikken Yōseikai	Tetsuo Uraguchi	22,069	8.6	▼1.0
National Cooperative	Takashi Azuma	20,056	7.8	▲1.1
Socialist	Setsuo Yokomichi	19,099	7.4	new
Socialist	Kiyoshi Masaki	16,424	6.4	▼3.3
JCP	Shunji Hirotani	14,388	5.6	▲3.5
Democratic	Nobuo Tanaka	13,390	5.2	new
Independent	Izumi Mori	11,066	4.3	▼1.0
National Cooperative	Chyōji Hase	10,090	3.9	new
Socialist	Kazuo Sakai	9,263	3.6	▼5.0
Japan Youth Party	Ninomiya Yoshiharu	3,249	1.3	▼0.7
Labourers and Farmers	Tamio Ujiie	2,588	1.0	new
Turnout			61.44	▲3.78
Registered electors		424,873		

1947: Hokkaido 1st District 5 members
Party	Candidate	Votes	%	±%
Liberal	Hidetoshi Tomabechi	41,887	18.6	
Democratic	Saburō Shiikuma	31,151	13.8	
Socialist	Kiyoshi Masaki	21,853	9.7	
Socialist	Kazuo Sakai	19,359	8.6	
Liberal	Masanobu Ogawara	17,674	7.8	
Rikken Yōseikai	Tetsuo Uraguchi	17,168	7.6	
National Cooperative	Takashi Azuma	15,165	6.7	
Independent	Izumi Mori	12,030	5.3	
Socialist	Ito Niizuma	11,734	5.2	
Liberal	Kōsaku Shinoda	9,136	4.0	
Independent	Michiyuki Yokoyu	6,919	3.1	
Independent	Kishi Sakai	6,718	3.0	
JCP	Shunji Hirotani	4,821	2.1	
Independent	Ninomiya Yoshiharu	4,424	2.0	
Independent	Shigenobu Sado	2,863	1.3	
Independent	Hiroshi Yamamoto	1,685	0.7	
Independent	Totaro Sakai	532	0.2	
Independent	Jizozaku Yamazaki	489	0.2	
Turnout			57.66	n/a
Registered electors		396,809		
