= Yutaka Arai =

Japanese politician

- 荒井 優
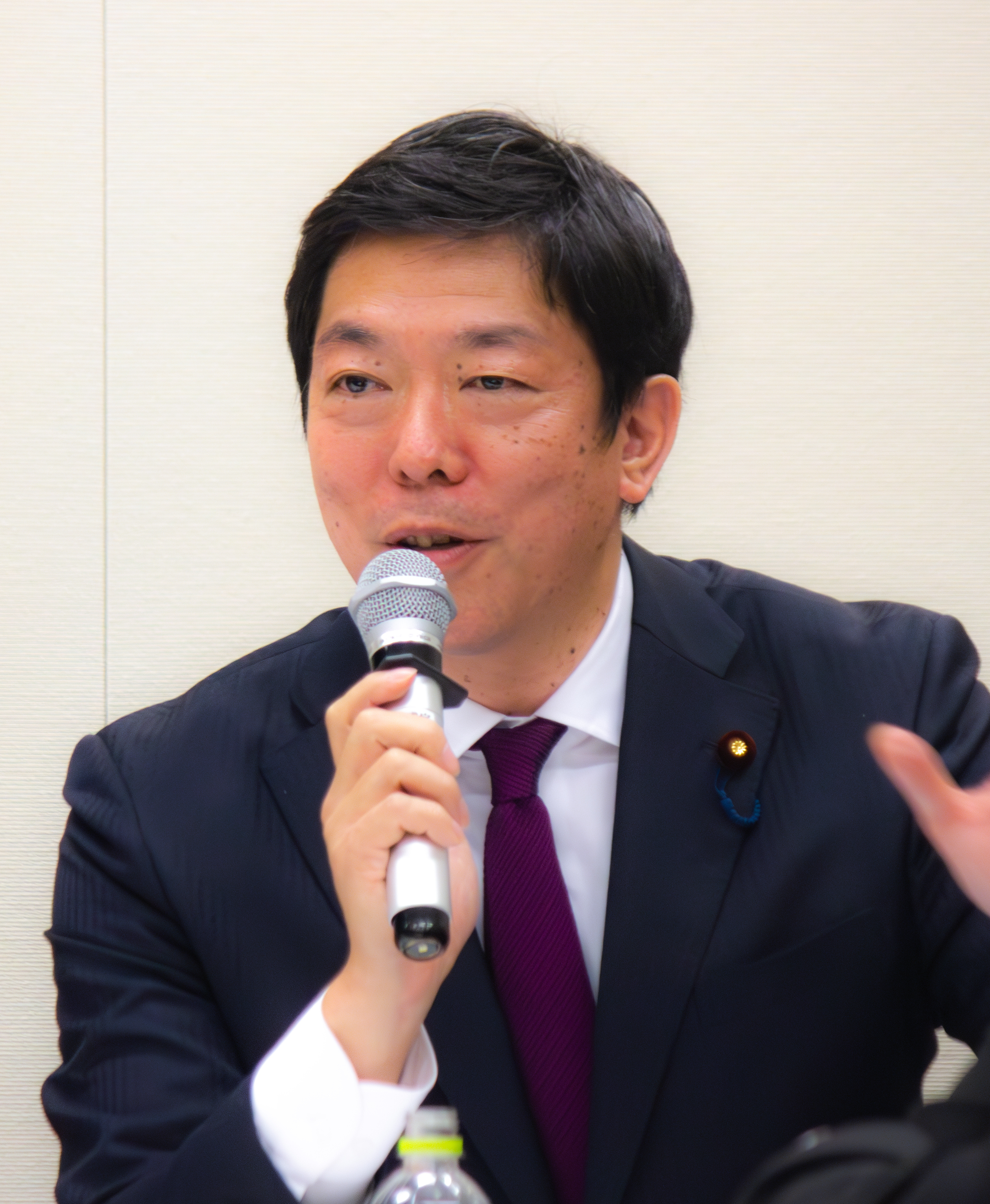
- Arai in 2024

Member of the House of Representatives
- In office 5 November 2021 – 23 January 2026
- Preceded by: Multi-member district
- Succeeded by: Hirohisa Takagi
- Constituency: Hokkaido PR (2021–2024); Hokkaido 3rd (2024–2026)

Personal details
- Born: 28 February 1975 (age 51) Chiba, Japan
- Party: CRA (since 2026)
- Other political affiliations: CDP (until 2026)
- Parent: Satoshi Arai (father)
- Education: Waseda University
- Website: araiyutaka.jp

Yutaka Arai (荒井 優, Arai Yutaka; 28 February 1975) is a Japanese politician of the CDP and a member of the House of Representatives in the Diet from 2021 to 2026.

== Career ==
Yutaka was born in Chiba. From the first to the third grade of elementary school, he studied at a Japanese elementary school in Sri Lanka due to his father Satoshi Arai's transfer to the Embassy of Japan in Sri Lanka. He later attended Sapporo Municipal Sankakuyama Elementary School, then attended junior high and high school in Yokohama, Kanagawa. While studying at Waseda University's Faculty of Political Economy in 1995, he served as the executive chairman of the YOSAKOI Soran Festival established by Gaku Hasegawa.

After graduating from Waseda University, he joined Recruit and was assigned to the study division. After that, he worked as a director of a venture company, yosanet Corporation, and moved to Softbank. After the Great East Japanese Earthquake, he served as managing director of Great East Japanese Earthquake Recovery Support Foundation while working in the president's office. During this period, as a member of Futaba County Council for the Promotion of Education and Reconstruction Vision, he was involved in the establishment of Fukushima Prefectural Futaba Mirai Gakuen High School.

=== Editorial when he was principal and president ===
In 2016, he became the principal of Sapporo Shinyō High School, which was established by his paternal grandfather, until he entrusted the position to his successor, Nobuko Akashi in March 2021. At that time, Kazuhiro Fujiwara recommended Yutaka as the youngest high school president in Japan. As principal, he doubled the number of students in his first year in office by establishing Hokkaido's first women's hardball baseball team, opening an open campus, and opening an exploration course, and hired Sayaka Kobayashi, known as "Biri Gyaru", as an intern.

As of August 2021, he is still involved in school management as vice president and head of the corporate headquarters of Sapporo Jikei Gakuen, and since July 2019, he has been president of Tomeikan Gakuen Junior and Senior High Schools in Saga.

In addition, he served as a visiting professor at the Information Management Innovation College, advisor to the nonprofit organization Kids Door (NPO KIDSDOOR/Non-Profit Organization), outside director of the Japan-U.S. Leadership Program USJLP Fellow, and Councillor of the Tokyo Children's Library.

At the Standing Committee of the Constitutional Democratic Party held on July 13, 2021, he was appointed as the head of Hokkaido 3rd district branch of the CDP to replace his retiring father Satoshi. In 2021 Japanese general election, he lost to LDP candidate Hirohisa Takagi. However, as the CDP got three seats in the Hokkaido PR block, Yutaka, the second-largest loser of the CDP (96.25%), was elected through Hokkaido PR block.

On 30 November 2021, Yutaka supported Kenta Izumi in the CDP leadership election following Yukio Edano's resignation.
