= Yoshimasa Hayashi =

Japanese politician (born 1961)

- 林 芳正
- Official portrait, 2025

Minister for Internal Affairs and Communications
- In office 21 October 2025 – 17 September 2026
- Prime Minister: Sanae Takaichi
- Preceded by: Seiichiro Murakami
- Succeeded by: Hisayuki Fujii
Other ministerial positions
Chief Cabinet Secretary
In office 14 December 2023 – 21 October 2025
Prime Minister	Fumio Kishida; Shigeru Ishiba
Preceded by	Hirokazu Matsuno
Succeeded by	Minoru Kihara
Minister for Foreign Affairs
In office 10 November 2021 – 13 September 2023
Prime Minister	Fumio Kishida
Preceded by	Fumio Kishida
Succeeded by	Yoko Kamikawa
Minister of Education, Culture, Sports, Science and Technology
In office 3 August 2017 – 2 October 2018
Prime Minister	Shinzō Abe
Preceded by	Hirokazu Matsuno
Succeeded by	Masahiko Shibayama
Minister of Agriculture, Forestry and Fisheries
In office 23 February 2015 – 7 October 2015
Prime Minister	Shinzō Abe
Preceded by	Koya Nishikawa
Succeeded by	Hiroshi Moriyama
In office 26 December 2012 – 3 September 2014
Prime Minister	Shinzō Abe
Preceded by	Akira Gunji
Succeeded by	Koya Nishikawa
Minister of State for Economic and Fiscal Policy
In office 2 July 2009 – 16 September 2009
Prime Minister	Taro Aso
Preceded by	Kaoru Yosano
Succeeded by	Naoto Kan
Minister of Defense
In office 2 August 2008 – 24 September 2008
Prime Minister	Yasuo Fukuda
Preceded by	Shigeru Ishiba
Succeeded by	Yasukazu Hamada

Member of the House of Representatives; for Yamaguchi's 3rd district
- Incumbent
- Assumed office 3 November 2021
- Preceded by: Takeo Kawamura

Member of the House of Councillors; for Yamaguchi's at-large district
- In office 24 July 1995 – 16 August 2021
- Preceded by: Ken'ichi Yamada
- Succeeded by: Tsuneo Kitamura

Personal details
- Born: 19 January 1961 (age 65) Shimonoseki, Japan
- Party: Liberal Democratic
- Spouse: Yuko Hayashi
- Children: 2
- Parent: Yoshiro Hayashi (father)
- Relatives: Reiko Hayashi (sister); Keisuke Hayashi (paternal grandfather); Heishiro Hayashi (great-great-grandfather); Katsusada Hirose (uncle-in-law); Ken Hirose (cousin)
- Education: University of Tokyo (LLB); Harvard University (MPA)
- Website: Official website

Yoshimasa Hayashi (林 芳正, Hayashi Yoshimasa; born 19 January 1961) is a Japanese politician who has been serving as Minister for Internal Affairs and Communications since October 2025. Hayashi previously held six cabinet positions: Minister of Defence (August–September 2008), Minister of State for Economic and Fiscal Policy (July–September 2009), Minister of Agriculture, Forestry and Fisheries (December 2012 – September 2014, February–October 2015), Minister of Education, Culture, Sports, Science and Technology (August 2017 – October 2018), and Minister of Foreign Affairs (November 2021 – September 2023), and Chief Cabinet Secretary (December 2023 – October 2025).

A member of the Liberal Democratic Party, Hayashi was first elected to the House of Councillors in 1995, where he served for five terms until 2021. He resigned from the House to stand in the 2021 general election and has been serving as a member of the House of Representatives, representing the Yamaguchi 3rd district, since October 2021.

== Early life and education ==
Hayashi was born on 19 January 1961 in Tokyo to Yoshiro and Yoneko Hayashi. His father, Yoshiro Hayashi, was a senior bureaucrat at the Ministry of Economy, Trade and Industry. The family moved to their ancestral home in Shimonoseki, Yamaguchi, when Yoshiro stood in the 32nd General Election in 1969, after which he successfully started his political career representing the Yamaguchi first constituency. Hayashi graduated from Shimonoseki-Nishi High School in 1979 and matriculated at the University of Tokyo. At university, he chose to study public law at the Shingaku Furiwake (the specialisation selection process in the middle of the second year) and graduated from the Faculty of Law in 1984. At the university, he was a member of the university choir as well as a rock band.

Initially, Hayashi had no intention of following in his father's footsteps as a member of parliament. Instead, he joined Mitsui & Co., rather than pursuing a career in one of the government ministries, which was the typical path for someone of his political and educational background. However, a brief posting to Nicaragua to renew tobacco contracts exposed him to the effects of the ongoing civil war, which made him realise the importance of a stable government. He also had several overseas postings, one of which was in North Carolina, United States, a major source of tobacco for Mitsui at the time.

He decided to pursue a political career and resigned from his role at Mitsui in 1989. He married Yuko Hayashi in 1990, who also attended the University of Tokyo and graduated in 1988. He started studying public policy at Harvard Kennedy School, while his wife studied for a master's degree in technology policy at Massachusetts Institute of Technology. Both universities are located in Cambridge, Massachusetts, United States. In the United States, he also worked as a staffer for U.S. Representative Stephen L. Neal and U.S. Senator William V. Roth, Jr. As the latter's staffer, he initiated Mansfield Fellowship Program.

== Political career ==
=== As a member of the House of Councillors ===
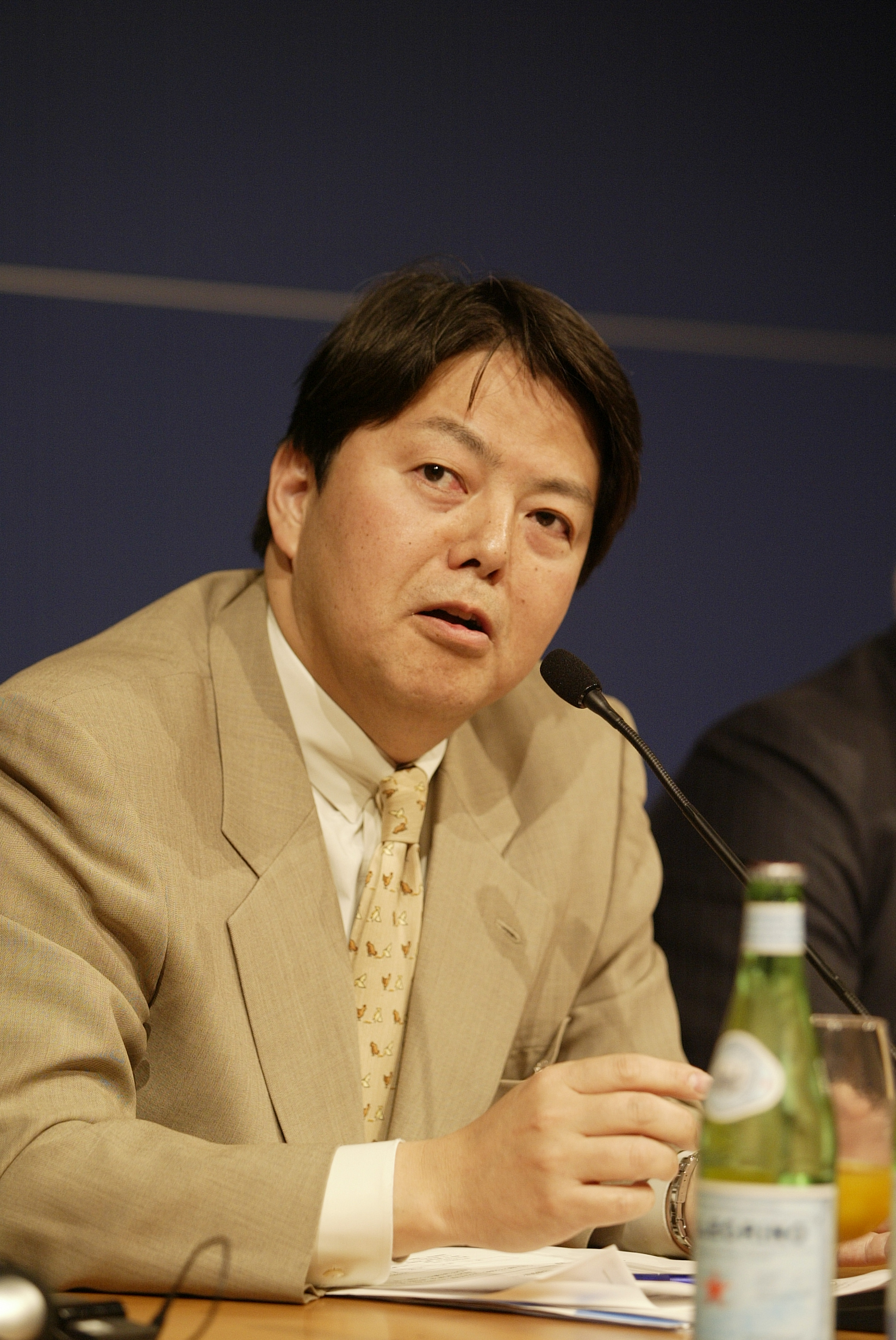
Hayashi in St. Gallen in Switzerland in 2011

Hayashi entered politics as a secretary to his father, Yoshiro Hayashi, when he was appointed Minister of Finance in the Miyazawa Cabinet after the first reshuffle in December 1992. Hayashi was elected to the House of Councillors for the first time in 1995. He represents the fourth generation of politicians in his family. He focused on administrative and tax reform in the early years of his political career. He joined the Kōchikai faction in the Liberal Democratic Party, which has traditionally held moderate conservative views, with an emphasis on economic prosperity, liberal values, and international cooperation, opposing the reliance on nationalism as an ideology. Both his father and former prime minister Kiichi Miyazawa belonged to this faction. He was appointed Parliamentary Vice Minister of Finance (大蔵政務次官) in October 1999, under Miyazawa, who was serving as Minister of Finance in the Obuchi Cabinet.

Hayashi was appointed to the Cabinet for the first time as Minister of Defence on 1 August 2008, when there was a reshuffle of the Fukuda Cabinet. However, Fukuda resigned on 24 September 2008, and Hayashi was replaced by Yasukazu Hamada. After his party became the main opposition party in the 2009 general election, he served as the Shadow Minister of Finance. He stood in the 2012 LDP presidential election, which was held just before a landslide victory in the 2012 general election allowed his party to return to power, but the eventual winner was Shinzo Abe. He was refused support by one MP who told him, 'The prime minister should belong to the Lower House because an Upper House premier does not risk his seat when calling an election'.

==== As Minister of Agriculture, Forestry and Fisheries ====
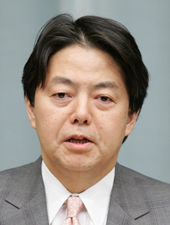
Hayashi as Minister of Agriculture in 2012

In the Second Abe Cabinet, which was formed on 26 December 2012, Hayashi was appointed Minister of Agriculture, Forestry and Fisheries. He remained in this role until 3 September 2014, when the Third Abe Cabinet was formed. When his successor Koya Nishikawa had to resign from his office following a scandal, Hayashi was asked to return to the ministry and served again as Minister of Agriculture, Forestry and Fisheries from 23 February 2015 to 7 October 2015. With a shrinking domestic market, many of the agricultural policies under his leadership focused on making the industry more export-oriented. He promoted the 'FBI' strategy, which means promoting authentic cuisine from Japan overseas, fostering food businesses by Japanese companies overseas, and exporting foods made in Japan. Food exports from Japan, which had remained stagnant at around 450 billion yen annually until 2012, increased to 745 billion yen by 2015.

==== As Minister of Education, Culture, Sports, Science and Technology ====
He was appointed Minister of Education, Culture, Sports, Science and Technology on 3 August 2017 in a reshuffle of the Third Abe Cabinet. He remained in this position in the Fourth Abe Cabinet, which was formed in November the same year. He served until the Cabinet reshuffle in October 2018.

=== As a member of the House of Representatives ===
Hayashi held a press conference on 15 July 2021 and announced his intention to stand as a candidate in the 2021 general election, which meant switching to the Lower House. He resigned from the House of Councillors on 16 August 2021. He faced opposition from the then-serving MP for Yamaguchi 3rd constituency, Takeo Kawamura, who was initially expected to remain the official LDP candidate with the backing of his faction leader, Toshihiro Nikai. On 29 September, Fumio Kishida, who also belongs to the Kōchikai faction and shares similar political views with Hayashi, won the 2021 LDP presidential election and became prime minister. Following this, the LDP’s Yamaguchi Local Committee asked to make Hayashi the official candidate, and after being persuaded by Akira Amari, who showed him secret survey results indicating Hayashi was more than twice as popular as Kawamura in the constituency, Kawamura decided not to stand in the election. As the official LDP candidate, Hayashi won 77% of the votes and became a member of the House of Representatives.

==== As Minister for Foreign Affairs ====
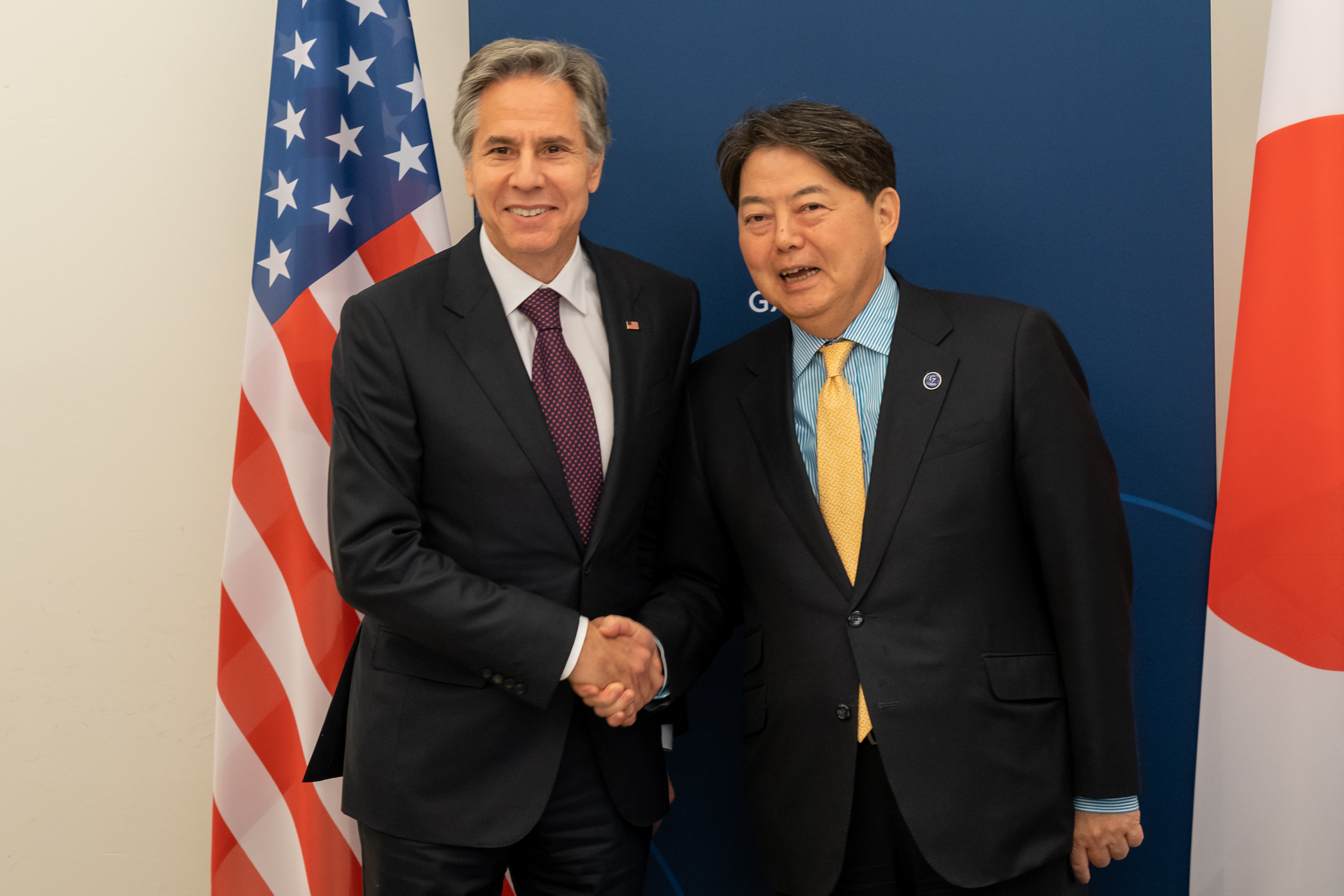
Hayashi with US Secretary of State Antony Blinken in November 2022

In November 2021 he was appointed as the Minister for Foreign Affairs in the Second Kishida Cabinet. Hayashi was the first Japanese foreign minister to attend a NATO foreign ministers meeting in Brussels in April 2022.

==== As Chief Cabinet Secretary ====
Hayashi left cabinet in the September 2023 reshuffle and became subcommittee chairman of the LDP Tax Commission, but in December he returned to cabinet as Chief Cabinet Secretary after the resignation of Hirokazu Matsuno.

On 3 September 2024, Hayashi announced his campaign for LDP leadership. He lost and was eliminated in the first round voting with 8.84% of votes in fourth place. New Prime Minister Shigeru Ishiba retained Hayashi as Chief Cabinet Secretary in his cabinet.

==== As Minister of Internal Affairs and Communications ====
On October 21, 2025, he was appointed Minister of Internal Affairs and Communications in the Takaichi Cabinet.

== Personal life ==
He likes karaoke and golf. He plays the guitar and keyboard with LDP colleagues in a band called Gi!nz.

Political offices
Preceded by Shigeru Ishiba	Minister of Defense; 2008	Succeeded by Yasukazu Hamada
Preceded by Kaoru Yosano	Minister of State for Economic and Fiscal Policy; 2009	Succeeded by Naoto Kan
Preceded by Akira Gunji	Minister of Agriculture, Forestry and Fisheries; 2012–2014	Succeeded by Koya Nishikawa
Preceded by Koya Nishikawa	Minister of Agriculture, Forestry and Fisheries; 2015	Succeeded by Hiroshi Moriyama
Preceded by Hirokazu Matsuno	Minister of Education, Culture, Sports, Science and Technology; 2017–2018	Succeeded by Masahiko Shibayama
Preceded by Toshimitsu Motegi	Minister of Foreign Affairs; 2021–2023	Succeeded by Yōko Kamikawa
Preceded by Hirokazu Matsuno	Chief Cabinet Secretary; 2023–2025	Succeeded by Minoru Kihara
House of Councillors
Preceded by Kenichi Yamada	Councillor for Yamaguchi at-large district 1995–2021	Succeeded by Tsuneo Kitamura
House of Representatives (Japan)
Preceded by Takeo Kawamura	Representative for Yamaguchi 3rd district 2021–present	Incumbent
