= Kinya Machimura =

Japanese politician (1859–1944)

Machimura Kinya
- 町村 金弥
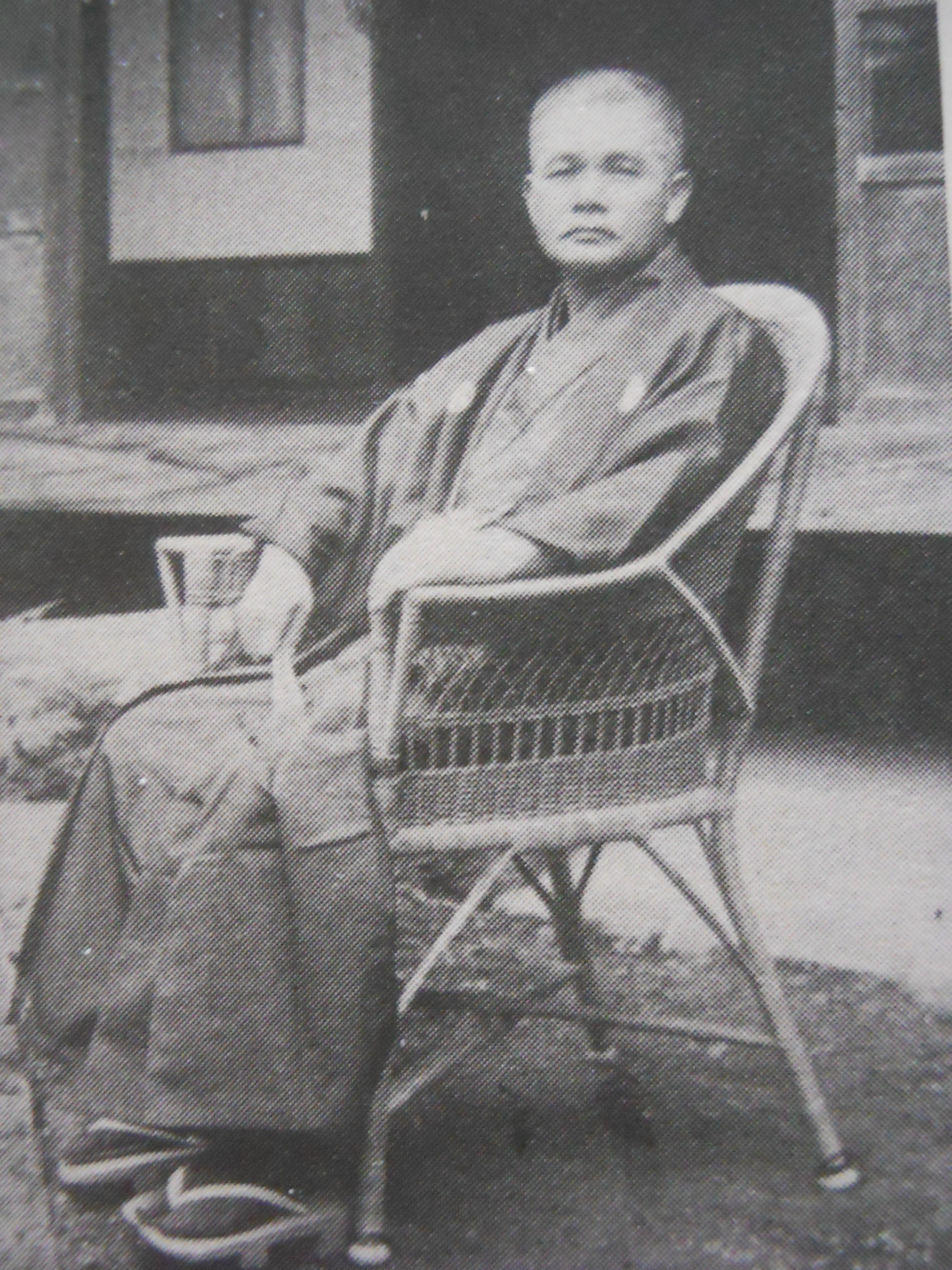
- Born: 14 February 1859; Takefu, Echizen, Japan
- Died: 25 November 1944 (aged 85); Takefu, Fukui, Japan
- Education: Imperial Technical College
- Occupation: Entrepreneur
- Children: Kingo Machimura
- Relatives: Nobutaka Machimura (grandson)

Machimura Kinya (Jap. 町村 金弥; 14 February 1859 – 25 November 1944) was a Japanese entrepreneur, "the father of Hokkaido dairy farming". He was the father of Kingo Machimura, and grandfather of Nobutaka Machimura.

== Biography ==
Born in Takefu (now part of Echizen in Fukui Prefecture) as the eldest son of Machimura Orinojo, the ninth head of the Machimura family and a vassal of the Honda family. His father, Orinojo, served as a machi-bugyo and was considered an "honest and decent bushi," and after the Meiji Restoration he taught children in the terakoya.

In 1867, at the age of 8, he entered the Fukui Princely School, and his father became a member of the ton'i wholesale mosquito netting trade, a Takefu branded product, in Nihonbashi in Tokyo. In 1871, Kinya began attending night school to help his father in the trade.

In 1873, in order to learn English, Matimura entered the Aichi School of Foreign Languages, where he studied with Tsubouchi Shōyō and Miyake Setsurei. In 1875, after graduation, he attended a preparatory course at the Imperial Technical College in Tokyo, where he was taught by an English teacher, Hamilton.

In 1877 Kinya took the college entrance examination, but because of the Satsuma Rebellion, which increased military expenditures, the number of free places was cut in half, and Matimura could not afford the tuition. Around the same time, in 1876, the Sapporo Agricultural College, founded by William S. Clark, was recruiting government-funded second-year students and those who had passed the technical college examination, so Kinya responded immediately.

Together with 18 students, including Uchimura Kanzo, Nitobe Inazō, and Miyabe Kingo, sailed from Shinagawa on 27 August 1877, and on 3 September landed in Otaru, from where they headed to Sapporo on horseback, arriving at the school dormitory near the present clock tower. During the four years of study at the agricultural school, all of the main teachers were Americans, so progress in learning English was considerable. Kinya also studied the American method of farm management under Edwin Dana, who worked for the Hokkaido Development Commission as an o-yata gaikokujin.

In July 1881 he graduated from the Sappor Agricultural School. In the same year, he became manager of the Makomanai cattle farm. In 1890 he became head of a farm in Uryū. In 1897 he became head of the Tokachi Kaikon Farming Company.

From 1901, Matimura served as a staff agricultural engineer in the Japanese Army Ministry and was in charge of the Combat Cavalry Reinforcement Division in Kushiro City and the prefectures of Iwate and Fukushima. Kinya moved to Tokyo in 1910 and resigned from the War Ministry in 1916. For the next 10 years he served as mayor of Okubo (now Shinjuku district) and after leaving his post he lived a comfortable life, and during World War II he was evacuated to his hometown of Takefu, where he died at the age of 85.

== Family ==
Wives, Yamamoto Soto and Yamamoto Kaoru, the third and second daughters of businessman Yamamoto Isen. The marriage produced five sons: Hirotaka, Makoto, Minoru, Keizo, Kingo, and five daughters: Koto, Sen, Sachiko, Haruko, Sadako.
