= Takeo Kawamura (politician) =

Japanese politician (born 1942)

- 河村 建夫
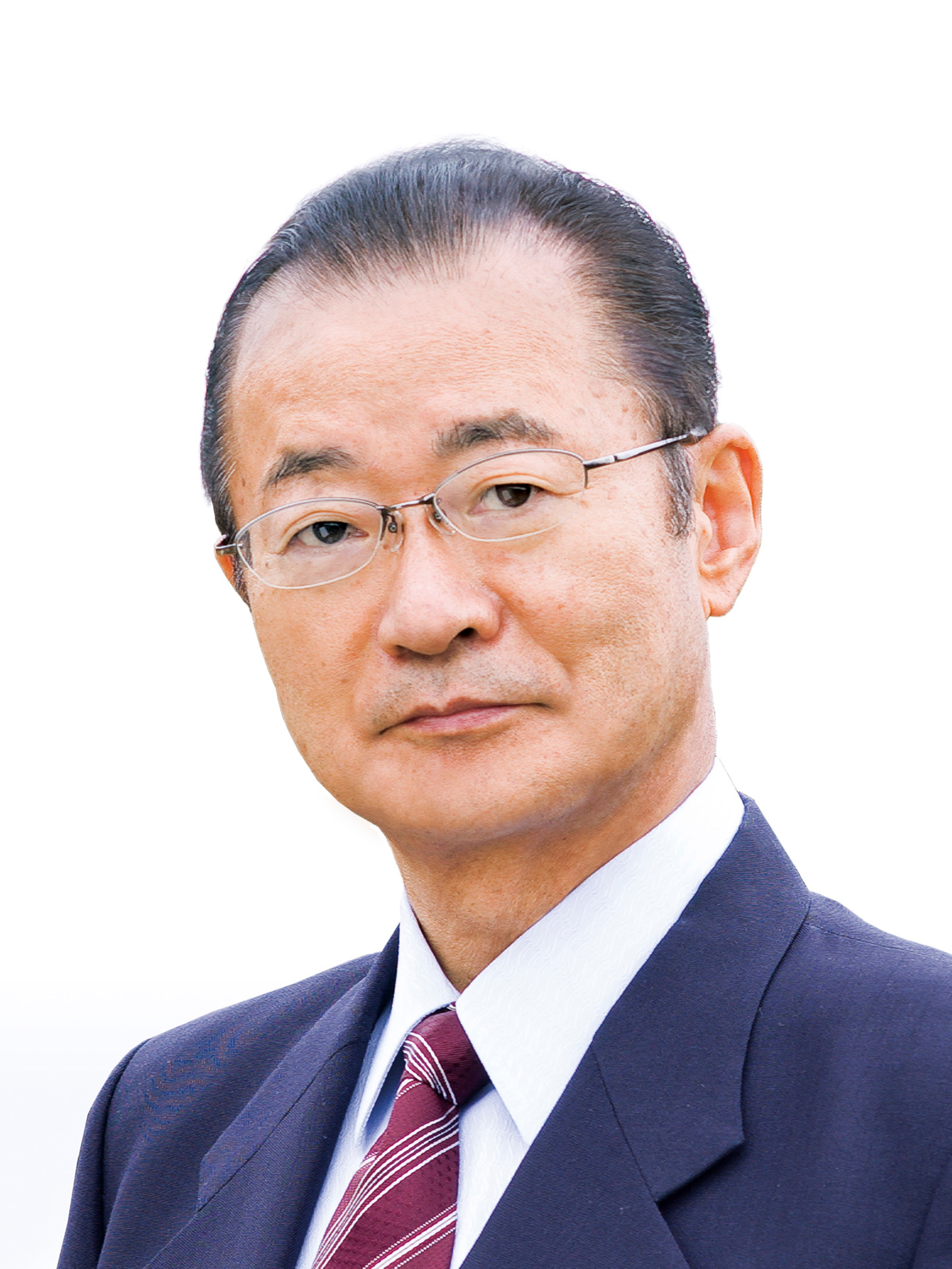
- Official portrait, 2012

Chief Cabinet Secretary
- In office 24 September 2008 – 16 September 2009
- Prime Minister: Tarō Asō
- Preceded by: Nobutaka Machimura
- Succeeded by: Hirofumi Hirano

Minister of Education, Culture, Sports, Science and Technology
- In office 22 September 2003 – 27 September 2004
- Prime Minister: Junichiro Koizumi
- Preceded by: Atsuko Tōyama
- Succeeded by: Nariaki Nakayama

Member of the House of Representatives
- In office 19 February 1990 – 14 October 2021
- Preceded by: Tanaka Tatsuo
- Succeeded by: Yoshimasa Hayashi
- Constituency: Yamaguchi 1st (1990–1996); Yamaguchi 3rd (1996–2021)

Personal details
- Born: 10 November 1942 (age 83) Hagi, Yamaguchi, Japan
- Party: Liberal Democratic
- Children: 4
- Education: Keio University

Takeo Kawamura (河村 建夫, Kawamura Takeo; born 10 November 1942) is a former Japanese politician from the Liberal Democratic Party, who served as Chief Cabinet Secretary from 2008 to 2009, and a member of the House of Representatives from 1990 to 2021, representing the Yamaguchi 3rd district.

== Political career ==
A native of Hagi, Yamaguchi and graduate of Keio University, he worked at Seibu Oil from 1967 to 1976. Kawamura then entered politics and served four terms in the Yamaguchi Prefecture assembly from 1976, followed by his election to the House of Representatives for the first time in 1990.

Kawamura served for a time as Minister of Education, Science and Technology under Prime Minister Junichiro Koizumi. In the Cabinet of Prime Minister Taro Aso, Kawamura was appointed as Chief Cabinet Secretary on 24 September 2008. He also served as Minister of State for Abduction issues in the Aso Cabinet, and as Chairman of the LDP's Election Strategy Committee.

House of Representatives (Japan)
Preceded by Multi-member constituency	Representative for Yamaguchi's 1st District (multi-member); 1990–1996	District eliminated
New creation	Representative for Yamaguchi's 3rd District; 1996–present	Incumbent
Political offices
Preceded by Nobutaka Machimura	Chief Cabinet Secretary; 2008–2009	Succeeded by Hirofumi Hirano
Preceded by Atsuko Tōyama	Minister of Education, Culture, Sports, Science and Technology; 2003–2004	Succeeded by Nariaki Nakayama
