= Hirohisa Takagi =

Japanese politician

- 高木 宏壽
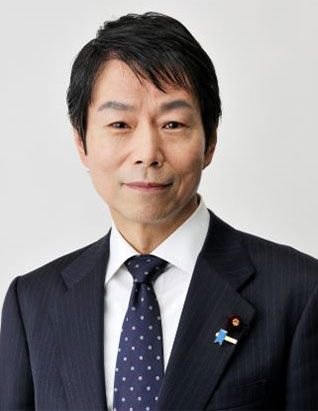
- Official portrait, 2023

Member of the House of Representatives
- Incumbent
- Assumed office 9 February 2026
- Preceded by: Yutaka Arai
- Constituency: Hokkaido 3rd
- In office 1 November 2021 – 9 October 2024
- Preceded by: Satoshi Arai
- Succeeded by: Yutaka Arai
- Constituency: Hokkaido 3rd
- In office 17 December 2012 – 28 September 2017
- Preceded by: Satoshi Arai
- Succeeded by: Satoshi Arai
- Constituency: Hokkaido 3rd

Member of the Hokkaido Legislative Assembly
- In office 2007 – November 2012
- Constituency: Toyohira-ku, Sapporo

Personal details
- Born: 9 April 1960 (age 66) Toyohira-ku, Sapporo, Hokkaido, Japan
- Party: Liberal Democratic
- Education: Keio University
- Website: Hirohisa Takagi website

Hirohisa Takagi (高木 宏壽, Hirohisa Takagi; born 9 April 1960) is a Japanese politician of the Liberal Democratic Party, who serves as a member of the House of Representatives.

== Early years ==
In 1960, Takagi was born in Toyohira-ku, Sapporo, Hokkaido.

After graduating from Keio University's Faculty of Law, he entered Hokkaido Takushoku Bank in 1987 and worked at Marunouchi branch, Tokyo headquarters international planning department, Los Angeles branch, and head office sales department. In 1995, he was hired by the Hokkaido Police as a special investigator, and as a police inspector, he was in charge of investigating crimes against foreigners in Japan, and served as the head of the criminal division at a police station under Sapporo jurisdiction. He joined Asahi Audit Corporation in 2001 and worked as a U.S. certified public accountant in risk consulting and later worked at KPMG FAS.

== Political career ==
In 2007, Takagi ran for the Hokkaido Legislative Assembly and was elected for the first time. He was re-elected in the 2011 election.

In November 2012, Takagi resigned as a member of the Hokkaido Legislative Assembly and announced his candidacy for the general election. He ran for Hokkaido 3rd district defeated DPJ Incumbent Satoshi Arai.

In the 2014 general election, Takagi defeated DPJ’s Arai again.

In 2015, Takagi was appointed to Parliamentary Vice-Minister for Reconstruction and Parliamentary Vice-Minister of Cabinet Office in the Third Abe First reshuffled cabinet.

In the 2017 general election, Takagi lost to CDP’s Arai and lost re-election.

In the 2021 general election, Takagi defeated CDP’s Yutaka Arai, son of Satoshi Arai, after a close race and regained Hokkaido 3rd’s seat.

In 2023, Takagi was appointed to State Minister for Reconstruction in the Second Kishida Second reshuffled cabinet.

In the 2024 LDP presidential election, Takagi endorsed Takayuki Kobayashi as a recommender.

In the 2024 general election, Takagi lost to Arai (CDP).

In the 2026 general election, Takagi defeated CRA's Arai to regain Hokkaido 3rd’s seat.
