= Yamaguchi 3rd district =

Legislative district of Japan

Yamaguchi 3rd District
- Parliamentary constituency for the Japanese House of Representatives
- Numbered map of Yamaguchi Prefecture single-member districts
- Prefecture: Yamaguchi
- Proportional District: Chūgoku
- Electorate: 342,813 (2023)

Current constituency
- Created: 1994
- Party: LDP
- Representative: Yoshimasa Hayashi

Yamaguchi 3rd district (山口県第3区) is a single-member electoral district for the House of Representatives, the lower house of the National Diet of Japan. It is located in Western Yamaguchi Prefecture and includes Shimonoseki, the largest city in the prefecture.

== Area ==
- Shimonoseki
- Hagi
- Mine
- Nagato
- Sanyo-Onoda
- Abu Town

Before redistricting in 2022, Shimonoseki and Nagato had been a part of the abolished Yamaguchi 4th district.

== List of representatives ==
| Representative | Party | Dates | Notes |
|---|---|---|---|
| Takeo Kawamura | LDP | 1996 – 2021 | Chief Cabinet Secretary (2008 – 2009) |
| Yoshimasa Hayashi | LDP | 2021 – | Chief Cabinet Secretary (2023 – ) |

== Election results ==
2026
| Party | Candidate | Votes | % | ±% |
|---|---|---|---|---|
| LDP | Yoshimasa Hayashi | 113,502 | 62.5 | ▼7.2 |
| Sanseitō | Kaoru Shimamura (elected in Chūgoku PR block) | 23,266 | 12.8 | |
| Centrist Reform | Tomohiro Shinoda | 22,915 | 12.6 | |
| Ishin | Hirofumi Itō | 14,697 | 8.1 | ▼11.3 |
| JCP | Masako Fukiage | 7,149 | 3.9 | ▼7 |
| Turnout | | 181,529 | 55.11 | ▲4.68 |
| LDP hold | | | | |

2024
| Party | Candidate | Votes | % | ±% |
|---|---|---|---|---|
| LDP | Yoshimasa Hayashi | 115,687 | 69.7 | ▼10.2 |
| Ishin | Hirofumi Itō | 32,259 | 19.4 | |
| JCP | Masako Fukiage | 18,105 | 10.9 | |
| Turnout | | | 50.43 | ▲0.29 |
| LDP hold | | | | |

2021
| Party | Candidate | Votes | % | ±% |
|---|---|---|---|---|
| LDP （Komeito) | Yoshimasa Hayashi | 96,983 | 76.94 | ▲5.62 |
| CDP | Fumiko Sakamoto | 29,073 | 23.06 | ▼5.62 |
| Margin of victory | | 67,904 | 53,88 | ▲11.25 |
| LDP hold | | Swing | ▲5,62 | |
| Turnout | | | 50.14 | ▲5.39 |

2017
| Party | Candidate | Votes | % | ±% |
|---|---|---|---|---|
| LDP （Komeito） | Takeo Kawamura | 103,173 | 71.3 | ▲2.9 |
| CDP | Fumiko Sakamoto | 41,497 | 28.7 | New |
| Margin of victory | | 61,676 | 42.63 | |
| Turnout | | 144,670 | 55.53 | ▲3.33 |
| LDP hold | | Swing | ▲2.9 | |

2014
| Party | Candidate | Votes | % | ±% |
|---|---|---|---|---|
| LDP （Komeito） | Takeo Kawamura | 93,248 | 68.4 | ▼2.4 |
| DPJ | Noboru Miura | 29,329 | 21.5 | ▲2.7 |
| JCP | Takeshi Fujii | 13,818 | 10.1 | ▼0.2 |
| Margin of victory | | 63,919 | 46.86 | |
| Turnout | | 136,395 | 52.20 | ▼5.78 |
| LDP hold | | Swing | ▼2.4 | |

2012
| Party | Candidate | Votes | % | ±% |
|---|---|---|---|---|
| LDP （Komeito） | Takeo Kawamura | 107,833 | 70.8 | ▲10.7 |
| DPJ | Daisuke Nakaya | 28,663 | 18.8 | ▼19.5 |
| JCP | Hitomi Igarashi | 15,709 | 10.3 | − |
| Margin of victory | | 79,170 | 52.02 | |
| Turnout | | 152,205 | 57.98 | ▼12.34 |
| LDP hold | | Swing | ▲10.7 | |

2009
| Party | Candidate | Votes | % | ±% |
|---|---|---|---|---|
| LDP | Takeo Kawamura | 115,757 | 60.1 | ▼2.1 |
| DPJ | Noboru Miura | 73,760 | 38.3 | ▲9.0 |
| HRP | Shuichi Tsuda | 3,159 | 1.6 | New |
| Margin of victory | | 41,997 | 21.79 | |
| Turnout | | 192,671 | 70.32 | ▲2.29 |
| LDP hold | | Swing | ▼2.1 | |

2005
| Party | Candidate | Votes | % | ±% |
|---|---|---|---|---|
| LDP | Takeo Kawamura | 118,412 | 62.2 | ▼1.0 |
| DPJ | Noboru Miura | 55,815 | 29.3 | ▲0.4 |
| JCP | Goto Hiroshi | 16,124 | 8.5 | ▲0.6 |
| Margin of victory | | 62,597 | 32.88 | |
| Turnout | | 190,351 | 68.03 | ▲4.89 |
| LDP hold | | Swing | ▼1.0 | |

2003
| Party | Candidate | Votes | % | ±% |
|---|---|---|---|---|
| LDP | Takeo Kawamura | 111,658 | 63.2 | ▲4.9 |
| DPJ | Susumu Iwamoto | 50,975 | 28.9 | ▲7.2 |
| JCP | Teruhisa Tanaka | 13,909 | 7.9 | ▼2.3 |
| Margin of victory | | 60,683 | 34.37 | |
| Turnout | | 176,542 | 63.14 | ▼1.74 |
| LDP hold | | Swing | ▲4.9 | |

2000
| Party | Candidate | Votes | % | ±% |
|---|---|---|---|---|
| LDP | Takeo Kawamura | 120,527 | 68.1 | ▼1.4 |
| JCP | Junichiro Iris | 38,507 | 21.7 | ▲3.0 |
| LLJ | Nobuo Sasaki | 18,022 | 10.2 | New |
| Margin of victory | | 82,020 | 46.32 | |
| Turnout | | 177,056 | 64.88 | − |
| LDP hold | | Swing | ▼1.4 | |

1996
| Party | Candidate | Votes | % | ±% |
|---|---|---|---|---|
| LDP | Takeo Kawamura | 108,995 | 69.5 | New |
| JCP | Tenmaya Kosei | 29,337 | 18.7 | New |
| Independent | Nobuo Sasaki | 12,834 | 8.2 | New |
| Independent | Etsoo Ito | 5,599 | 3.6 | New |
| Margin of victory | | 79,658 | 50.81 | − |
| Turnout | | 156,765 | - | − |
