= Usaburō Chisaki III =

Japanese politician

- 地崎 宇三郎

Minister of Transport
- In office 9 November 1979 – 17 July 1980
- Prime Minister: Masayoshi Ōhira
- Preceded by: Kinji Moriyama
- Succeeded by: Masajuro Shiokawa

Member of the House of Representatives
- In office 22 November 1963 – 28 November 1983
- Preceded by: Torazō Shimamoto
- Succeeded by: Nobutaka Machimura
- Constituency: Hokkaido 1st

Personal details
- Born: 21 July 1919 Sapporo, Hokkaido, Japan
- Died: 11 November 1987 (aged 68)
- Party: Liberal Democratic
- Parent: Usaburō Chisaki II (father)
- Education: Ritsumeikan University

Usaburō Chisaki III (Japanese: 地崎宇三郎 (三代); 1919–1987) was a Japanese politician. He was a member of the House of Representatives of Japan from Hokkaido. He was the son of Usaburō Chisaki II.

== See also ==
- List of people from Hokkaido
