= Gaku Ishizaki =

Japanese politician (born 1955)

- 石崎 岳
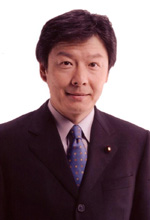
- Official portrait, 2008

Member of the House of Representatives
- In office 10 November 2003 – 21 July 2009
- Preceded by: Multi-member district
- Succeeded by: Satoshi Arai
- Constituency: Hokkaido PR (2003–2005); Hokkaido 3rd (2005–2009)
- In office 21 October 1996 – 2 June 2000
- Preceded by: Constituency established
- Succeeded by: Satoshi Arai
- Constituency: Hokkaido 3rd

Personal details
- Born: 9 July 1955 (age 71) Asahikawa, Hokkaido, Japan
- Party: Liberal Democratic
- Education: Kyoto University

Gaku Ishizaki (石崎 岳, Ishizaki Gaku; born 9 July 1955) is a Japanese former politician of the Liberal Democratic Party, who served as a member of the House of Representatives in the Diet (national legislature). A native of Asahikawa, Hokkaido and graduate of Kyoto University, he worked at Hokkaido Broadcasting, a local broadcast network in Hokkaido, from 1979 to 1996. He was elected to the House of Representatives for the first time in 1996 but lost his seat in 2000. In 2003, he ran unsuccessfully for mayor of Sapporo, Hokkaido but was re-elected to the House of Representatives in the same year.
