= Noboru Minowa =

Japanese politician

- 箕輪 登

Minister of Posts and Telecommunications
- In office 30 November 1981 – 27 November 1982
- Prime Minister: Zenkō Suzuki
- Preceded by: Ichirō Yamanouchi
- Succeeded by: Tokutarō Higaki

Member of the House of Representatives
- In office 30 January 1967 – 24 January 1990
- Preceded by: Saburō Shiikuma
- Succeeded by: Hideko Itō
- Constituency: Hokkaido 1st

Personal details
- Born: 5 March 1924 Otaru, Hokkaido, Japan
- Died: 14 May 2006 (aged 82) Sapporo, Hokkaido, Japan
- Party: Liberal Democratic
- Education: Hokkaido University

Noboru Minowa (Japanese: 箕輪登, romanized: Minowa Noboru) (March 5, 1924 – May 14, 2006) was a member of the House of Representatives of Japan from Hokkaido 1st district. He was from Otaru, Hokkaido, and a graduate of Hokkaido University.
