= Setsuo Yokomichi =

Japanese politician (1911–1967)

- 横路 節雄
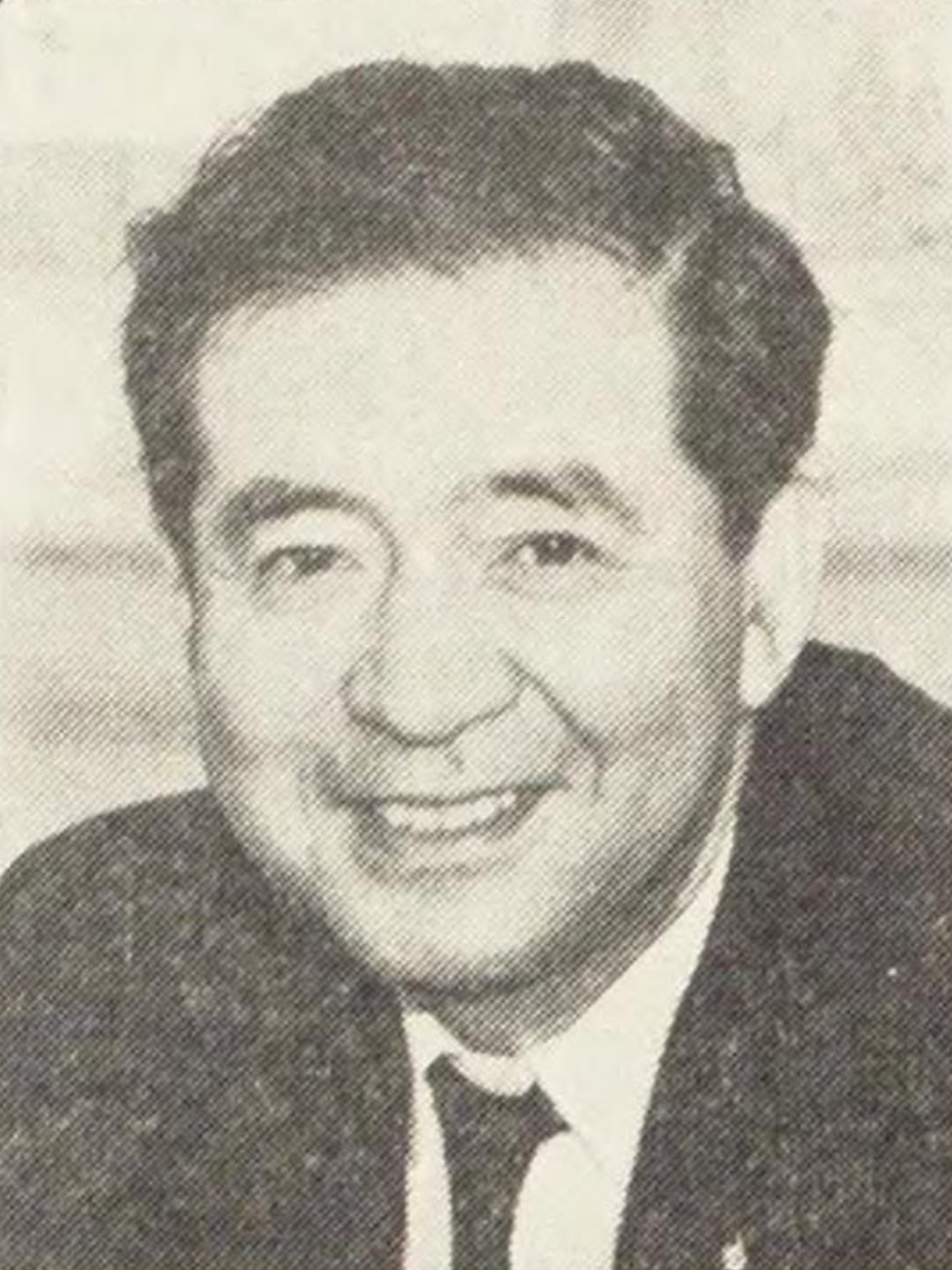
- Yokomichi in 1964

Member of the House of Representatives
- In office 19 May 1959 – 14 June 1967
- Preceded by: Himself
- Succeeded by: Takahiro Yokomichi
- Constituency: Hokkaido 1st
- In office 25 April 1952 – 26 March 1959
- Preceded by: Hidetoshi Tomabechi
- Succeeded by: Himself
- Constituency: Hokkaido 1st

Member of the Hokkaido Legislative Assembly
- In office 30 April 1947 – 27 December 1948
- Constituency: Sapporo City

Personal details
- Born: 2 January 1911 Yūbari, Hokkaido, Japan
- Died: 14 June 1967 (aged 56) Roppongi, Tokyo, Japan
- Party: Socialist
- Other political affiliations: LSP (1951–1955)
- Children: Takahiro Yokomichi
- Relatives: Eitaro Noro (brother-in-law)
- Education: Hokkaidō Teachers College

Setsuo Yokomichi (Japanese: 横路節雄; January 2, 1911 – June 14, 1967) was a Japanese politician. He was the father of Takahiro Yokomichi, Governor of Hokkaido from 1983 to 1995.
