= Hokkaido 3rd district =

Japan House of Representatives constituency

Hokkaidō 3rd District
- Parliamentary constituency for the Japanese House of Representatives
- Numbered map of Hokkaidō Prefecture single-member districts

- Sapporo-area detail
- Prefecture: Hokkaidō
- Proportional District: Hokkaidō
- Electorate: 474,944 (2021)

Current constituency
- Created: 1994
- Seats: One
- Party: LDP
- Representative: Hirohisa Takagi
- Created from: Hokkaido's 1st medium sized district
- Municipalities: Sapporo's Shiroishi, Toyohira, and Kiyota Wards

Hokkaidō 3rd district (北海道[第]3区, Hokkai-dō [dai-]san-ku) is a single-member electoral district for the House of Representatives, the lower house of the National Diet of Japan. It is located in Sapporo, the capital of Hokkaido, and consists of the wards of Toyohira, and Kiyota and most of Shiroishi ward.

Before the introduction of the current first-past-the-post/proportional representation parallel electoral system for the House of Representatives in the 1990s, Sapporo city had been part of the SNTV six-member 1st district.

== List of representatives ==
Representative	Party	Dates	Notes
Gaku Ishizaki	LDP	1996 – 2000	
Satoshi Arai	DPJ	2000 – 2005	Won in the PR block
Gaku Ishizaki	LDP	2005 – 2009	Also lost in the PR block
Satoshi Arai	DPJ	2009 – 2012	Won in the PR block
Hirohisa Takagi	LDP	2012 – 2017	Also lost in the PR block
Satoshi Arai	CDP	2017 – 2021	Retired in 2021
Hirohisa Takagi	LDP	2021 – 2024	Also lost in the PR block
Yutaka Arai	CDP	2024 – 2026	Also lost in the PR block
Hirohisa Takagi	LDP	2026 –	

== Recent results ==
2026
Party	Candidate	Votes	%	±%
LDP	Hirohisa Takagi (endorsed by Ishin)	114,285	46.5	▲11.9
Centrist Reform	Yutaka Arai	81,318	33.1	▼8.6
Sanseitō	Yoshiki Nakashima	34,838	14.2	
JCP	Maruko Yuko	15,595	6.3	▼3.3
Turnout		462,088	54.39	▲0.77
LDP gain from Centrist Reform				

2024
Party	Candidate	Votes	%	±%
CDP	Yutaka Arai	100,136	41.7	▼3.0
LDP	Hirohisa Takagi	83,089	34.6	▼8.4
JCP	Richiko Itō	22,915	9.6	new
Ishin	Yoshitaka Torikoshi	21,802	9.1	▼3.2
Independent	Kenji Masuda	11,972	5.0	new
Turnout			53.62	▼2.62
CDP gain from LDP				

2021
Party	Candidate	Votes	%	±%
LDP	Hirohisa Takagi (endorsed by Kōmeitō)	116,917	44,66	▼0.98
CDP	Yutaka Arai (won PR seat)	112,535	42.99	▼11.37
Ishin	Yasufumi Kowada	32,340	12.35	
Turnout			56.24	▼0.88
LDP gain from CDP		Swing	▲5.25	

2017
Party	Candidate	Votes	%	±%
CDP	Satoshi Arai	141,680	54.36	▲17.90
LDP	Hirohisa Takagi (endorsed by Kōmeitō and NPD)	118,961	45.64	▲6.17
Majority		22,719	8.72	
Turnout			57.12	▲4.01
CDP gain from LDP		Swing	▲5.87	

2014
Party	Candidate	Votes	%	±%
LDP	Hirohisa Takagi (endorsed by Kōmeitō)	92,649	39.47	▲2.59
Democratic	Satoshi Arai (won PR seat)	85,591	36.46	▲9.50
JCP	Hiroko Yoshioka	30,271	12.90	▲4.68
Ishin	Yasufumi Kowada	26,211	11.17	▼3.82
Turnout			53.11	▼1.97

2012
Party	Candidate	Votes	%	±%
LDP	Hirohisa Takagi (endorsed by Kōmeitō)	88,360	36.88	
Democratic	Satoshi Arai (endorsed by PNP) (won PR seat)	64,599	26.96	
Restoration	Yasufumi Kowada (endorsed by Your Party)	35,907	14.99	new
NP-Daichi	Junko Machikawa (endorsed by TPJ)	31,024	12.95	new
JCP	Tsuneto Mori	19,705	8.22	new
Turnout			55.08	▼15.83

2009
Party	Candidate	Votes	%	±%
Democratic	Satoshi Arai (endorsed by PNP)	186,081	60.9	
LDP	Gaku Ishizaki (endorsed by Kōmeitō)	112,844	36.9	
Happiness Realization	Yoshinori Moriyama	6,723	2.2	
Turnout		305,648	70.91	▲3.26

2005
Party	Candidate	Votes	%	±%
LDP	Gaku Ishizaki (endorsed by Kōmeitō	138,765	48.4	
Democratic	Satoshi Arai (won PR seat)	125,445	43.7	
JCP	Ryūji Kawabe	22,581	7.9	
Turnout		286,791	67.65	

2003
Party	Candidate	Votes	%	±%
Democratic	Satoshi Arai (endorsed by SDP)	114,131	46.8	
LDP	Gaku Ishizaki (endorsed by NCP) (won PR seat)	111,252	45.6	
JCP	Ryūji Kawabe	18,537	7.6	
Turnout		243,920	58.48	

2000
Party	Candidate	Votes	%	±%
Democratic	Satoshi Arai	96,653	40.5	
LDP	Gaku Ishizaki (endorsed by NCP)	90,694	38.0	
JCP	Kenji Kodama (won PR seat)	41,499	17.4	
Liberal League	Mitsuhiro Yokoyama	9,909	4.2	
Turnout		238,755	59.92	

1996
Party	Candidate	Votes	%	±%
LDP	Gaku Ishizaki	54,275	26.3	
Democratic	Satoshi Arai (endorsed by NPS)	51,479	25.0	
New Frontier	Wakio Mitsui	50,902	24.7	
JCP	Kenji Kodama (won PR seat)	40,623	19.7	
New Socialist	Tomoka Uchimoto	9,010	4.4	
