= Torazō Shimamoto =

Japanese politician

- 島本 虎三

Mayor of Niki
- In office 1979–1987

Member of the House of Representatives
- In office 29 January 1967 – 7 September 1979
- Preceded by: Yasuo Tomariya
- Succeeded by: Mitsuo Tada
- Constituency: Hokkaido 1st
- In office 20 November 1960 – 23 October 1963
- Preceded by: Kiyoshi Masaki
- Succeeded by: Usaburō Chisaki III
- Constituency: Hokkaido 1st

Member of the Hokkaido Legislative Assembly
- In office 1959–1960

Member of the Otaru City Council
- In office 1947–1959

Personal details
- Born: 20 June 1914 Otaru, Hokkaido, Japan
- Died: 10 November 1989 (aged 75) Sapporo, Hokkaido, Japan
- Party: Socialist

Torazō Shimamoto (Japanese: 島本虎三; 20 June 1914 – 10 November 1989) was a Japanese politician from Takashima, Hokkaido (now part of Otaru, Hokkaido). He belonged to the Japan Socialist Party, and was a member of the House of Representatives of Japan from Hokkaido 1st district.

== Bibliography ==
- Shimamoto, Torazō (1979). Maboroshi no Ōgonritsu: Watashi no Hanseiki (『まぼろしの黄金律』-わたしの半生記). Zendentsū Rōdōkumiai Hokkaidō Honbu Seijikyoku (全電通労働組合北海道本部政治局). ASIN B000J8EYRS
- Shimamoto, Torazō (October 1988). Shimamoto no Machi-okoshi Funsen-ki (島虎の町おこし奮戦記). Daiichi Shorin. ISBN 978-4886460387

== Awards ==
In 1984, he received the Order of the Rising Sun, 2nd Class.
