= Nobutaka Machimura =

Japanese politician (1944–2015)

Junior Second Rank Nobutaka Machimura
- 町村 信孝
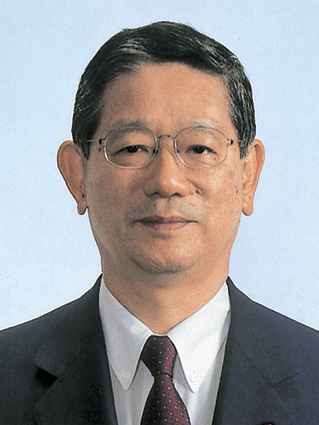
- Official portrait, 2005

Speaker of the House of Representatives
- In office 24 December 2014 – 21 April 2015
- Monarch: Akihito
- Deputy: Tatsuo Kawabata
- Preceded by: Bunmei Ibuki
- Succeeded by: Tadamori Oshima

Chief Cabinet Secretary
- In office 26 September 2007 – 24 September 2008
- Prime Minister: Yasuo Fukuda
- Preceded by: Kaoru Yosano
- Succeeded by: Takeo Kawamura

Minister for Foreign Affairs
- In office 27 August 2007 – 26 September 2007
- Prime Minister: Shinzō Abe
- Preceded by: Tarō Asō
- Succeeded by: Masahiko Kōmura
- In office 27 September 2004 – 21 September 2005
- Prime Minister: Junichiro Koizumi
- Preceded by: Yoriko Kawaguchi
- Succeeded by: Tarō Asō

Minister of Education, Culture, Sports, Science and Technology
- In office 6 January 2001 – 26 April 2001
- Prime Minister: Yoshirō Mori
- Preceded by: Office established
- Succeeded by: Toyama Atsuko

Minister of Education, Science, Sports and Culture
- In office 5 December 2000 – 6 January 2001
- Prime Minister: Yoshirō Mori
- Preceded by: Tadamori Ōshima
- Succeeded by: Office abolished
- In office 11 September 1997 – 30 July 1998
- Prime Minister: Ryutaro Hashimoto
- Preceded by: Takashi Kosugi
- Succeeded by: Akito Arima

Member of the House of Representatives
- In office 25 October 2010 – 1 June 2015
- Preceded by: Chiyomi Kobayashi
- Succeeded by: Yoshiaki Wada
- Constituency: Hokkaido 5th
- In office 19 December 1983 – 1 October 2010
- Preceded by: Usaburō Chisaki III
- Succeeded by: Hiroshi Imazu
- Constituency: Hokkaido 1st (1983–1996); Hokkaido 5th (1996–2009); Hokkaido PR (2009–2010)

Personal details
- Born: 17 October 1944 Numazu, Shizuoka, Japan
- Died: 1 June 2015 (aged 70) Tokyo, Japan
- Party: Liberal Democratic
- Children: 2
- Parent: Kingo Machimura (father)
- Relatives: Kinya Machimura (grandfather); Satoru Yamamoto (brother-in-law); Yoshiaki Wada (son-in-law)
- Education: University of Tokyo; Wesleyan University

Nobutaka Machimura (町村 信孝, Machimura Nobutaka; 17 October 1944 – 1 June 2015) was a Japanese politician. He was a member of the House of Representatives of Japan and a member of the Liberal Democratic Party. He was Chief Cabinet Secretary in the government of Prime Minister Yasuo Fukuda from 2007 to 2008 and twice Minister for Foreign Affairs, in the cabinets of Junichiro Koizumi and Shinzō Abe. He resigned as the Speaker of the House of Representatives on 21 April 2015 after suffering from a stroke.

== Early life and education ==
Machimura was born on 17 October 1944. His father was Kingo Machimura, the Governor of Hokkaido (1959–1971) and his grandfather was Kinya Machimura, one of the founders of Hokkaido's dairy industry. Machimura attended the University of Tokyo and Wesleyan University in the United States.

== Career ==
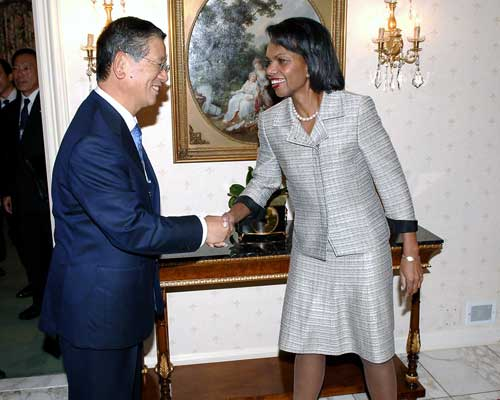
Nobutaka Machimura and Condoleezza Rice in September 2007

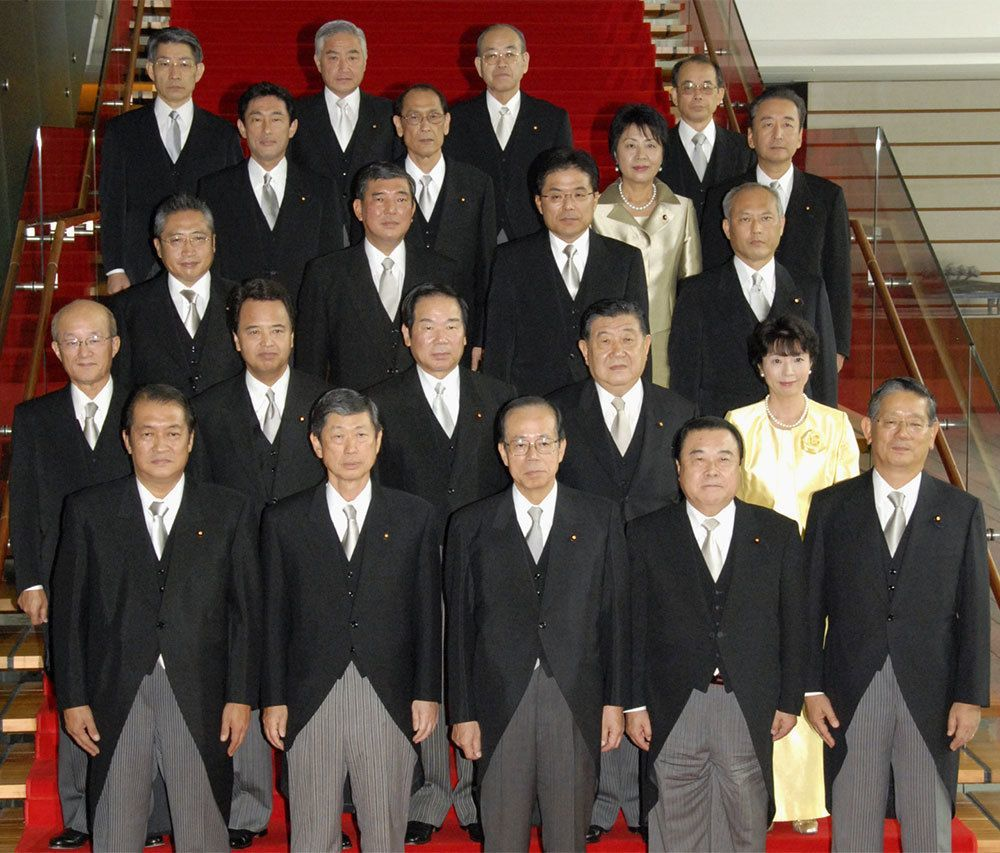
With members of the Yasuo Fukuda Cabinet in September 2007

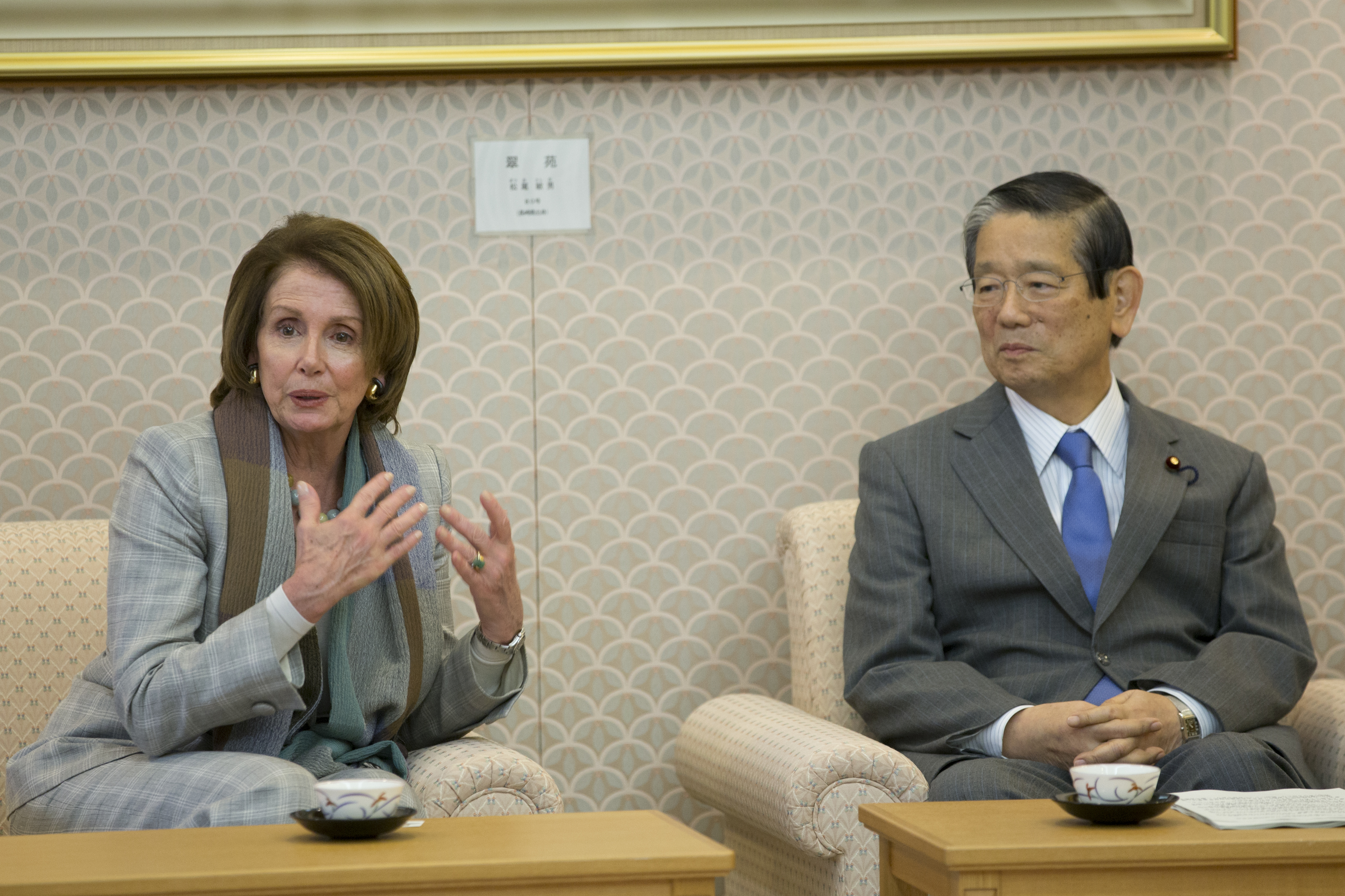
Machimura with Nancy Pelosi in April 2015

Machimura was elected to his first term in the House of Representatives in the December 1983 election, and he was re-elected in each election since. He became Minister of Education, Science, Sports and Culture on 11 September 1997, as part of Prime Minister Ryutaro Hashimoto's second cabinet, and became State Secretary for Foreign Affairs on 31 July 1998, in Keizō Obuchi's first cabinet. In March 2000, he became Special Advisor to the Prime Minister, serving under Obuchi and his successor, Yoshirō Mori. On 5 December 2000, he became Minister of Education, Science, Sports and Culture and Director-General of the Science and Technology Agency, before becoming Minister of Education, Culture, Sports, Science and Technology on 6 January 2001.

He was the Minister for Foreign Affairs under Prime Minister Junichiro Koizumi from 27 September 2004 to 31 October 2005. His goals included signing a treaty with Russia relations with China and Korea form leader resolving a border dispute, and investigating the whereabouts of Japanese hostages who were kidnapped by North Korean agents during the 1970s and 1980s. He was replaced by Tarō Asō in the cabinet reshuffle that followed the 11 September 2005 election.

He was appointed Minister for Foreign Affairs again by Prime Minister Shinzō Abe on 27 August 2007. In 2006, Machimura became chairman of the Seiwa Seisaku Kenkyūkai, the LDP's largest faction. As such, on 14 September 2007, he backed Yasuo Fukuda's bid to become Abe's successor, following Abe's resignation on 12 September. Since 2007, Machimura had co-chaired his faction alongside Hidenao Nakagawa and Shūzen Tanigawa.

In Fukuda's government, sworn in on 16 September 2007, Machimura became Chief Cabinet Secretary and State Minister in charge of abduction issues. He was replaced by Takeo Kawamura in the cabinet of prime minister Taro Aso, which was appointed on 24 September 2008.

He was the vice president of the Japan-China Friendship Parliamentarians' Union.

== Personal life ==
On 18 December 2007, Machimura said at an official press conference that he believed in the existence of UFOs.

On 1 June 2015, he died after a cerebral infarction at a hospital in Tokyo.

== Honours ==
- Junior Second Rank (1 June 2015; posthumous)

House of Representatives (Japan)
Preceded by Multi-member constituency	Representative for Hokkaidō 1st district (multi-member); 1983–1996	District eliminated
New constituency	Representative for Hokkaidō 5th district 1996–2009	Succeeded by Chiyomi Kobayashi
Preceded by N/A	Representative for the Hokkaidō PR block 2009–2010	Succeeded by N/A
Vacant Title last held by Chiyomi Kobayashi	Representative for Hokkaidō 5th district 2010–2015	Incumbent
Preceded by Bunmei Ibuki	Speaker of the House of Representatives of Japan; 2014–2015	Succeeded by Tadamori Oshima
Political offices
Preceded by Kaoru Yosano	Chief Cabinet Secretary; 2007–2008	Succeeded by Takeo Kawamura
Preceded by Kaoru Yosano	Minister of State for the Abduction Issue; 2007–2008	Succeeded by Kyoko Nakayama
Preceded by Tarō Asō	Minister for Foreign Affairs; 2007	Succeeded by Masahiko Kōmura
Preceded by Yoriko Kawaguchi	Minister for Foreign Affairs; 2004–2005	Succeeded by Tarō Asō
New creation	Minister of Education, Culture, Sports, Science and Technology; 2001	Succeeded by Atsuko Toyama
Preceded by Takashi Kosugi; Tadamori Oshima	Minister of Education; 1997–1998; 2000–2001	Succeeded by Akito Arima; Office abolished
