= Ito Niizuma =

Japanese politician (1890–1963)

- 新妻 イト
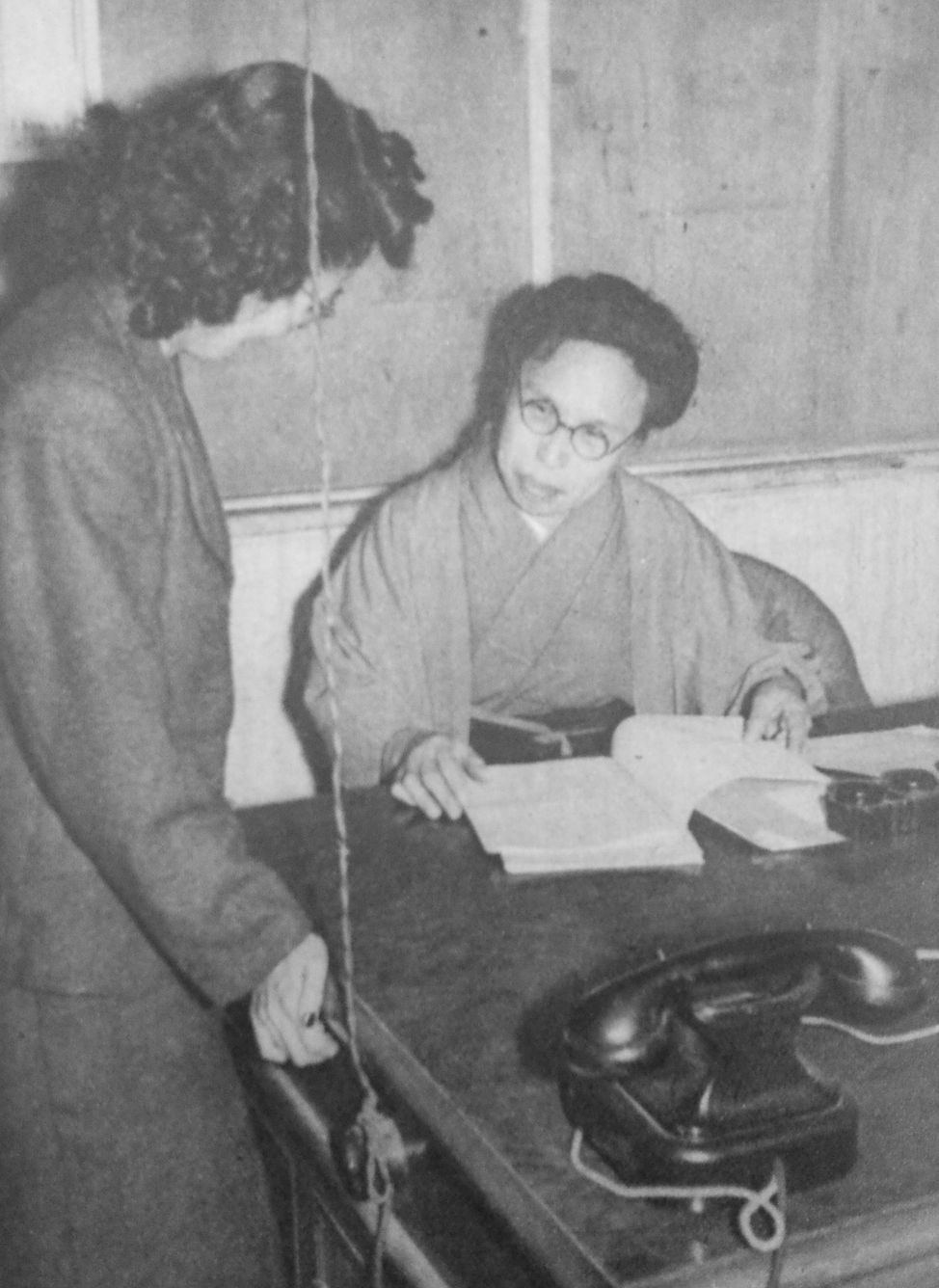

Member of the House of Representatives
- In office 10 April 1946 – 31 March 1947
- Preceded by: Constituency established
- Succeeded by: Constituency abolished
- Constituency: Hokkaido 1st

Personal details
- Born: 5 August 1890 Yokohama, Kanagawa, Japan
- Died: 15 July 1963 (aged 72)
- Party: Socialist

Ito Niizuma (Japanese: 新妻イト, 5 August 1890 – 15 July 1963) was a Japanese politician. She was one of the first group of women elected to the House of Representatives in 1946.

== Biography ==
Niizuma was born in Yokohama in 1890. She attended Yokohama English Commercial School, graduating in 1911. She then moved to San Francisco in the United States to study at a business college. She married journalist Kaoru Niizuma and joined a political study group led by Mosaburō Suzuki. During World War II she relocated to Hokkaido, where she worked for the Hokkaido Nichiyohin Katsuyo Kyokai in Sapporo. She also ran a typing school for girls and was part of the editorial committee of Katei Shinbun.

After the war, Niizuma contested the Hokkaido 1st district in the 1946 general elections as a Japan Socialist Party candidate, and was elected to the House of Representatives. During her time in parliament she called for the introduction of paternity leave, and was one of the speakers at the first public debate on sex education. She lost her seat in the 1947 elections and subsequently worked for the Ministry of Labour, in which she was the first head of the Boys and Women Division. She also became chair of the Women's Green Cross. She died in 1963.
