= 1971 Hokkaido gubernatorial election =

Election for Governor of Hokkaido

← 1967	11 April 1971	1975 →
- Turnout: 79.39%
Nominee	Naohiro Dōgakinai	Shōhei Tsukada	Nodoka Sakamoto
Party	LDP	Social Democratic	Independent
Popular vote	1,293,690	1,280,479	34,092
Governor before election
Kingo Machimura
LDP
Elected Governor
Naohiro Dōgakinai
LDP

A gubernatorial election was held on 11 April 1971 to elect the Governor of Hokkaido Prefecture.

== Candidates ==
- Naohiro Dōgakinai - director of the Hokkaido Research Institute, age 56
- Shōhei Tsukada - Vice-chairman of the Hokkaido Prefectural Assembly and 1967 Hokkaido gubernatorial election candidate, age 52
- Nodoka Sakamoto (坂本和, Sakamoto Nodoka), age 37

== Results ==
1971 Hokkaido gubernatorial election
Party	Candidate	Votes	%	±%
LDP	Naohiro Dōgakinai	1,293,690		
Social Democratic	Shōhei Tsukada	1,280,479		
Independent	Nodoka Sakamoto	34,092		
Turnout		2,657,449	79.39	
