= 1951 Hokkaido gubernatorial election =

Election for Governor of Hokkaido

← 1947	30 April 1951	1955 →
- Turnout: 81.17%
Nominee	Toshibumi Tanaka	Torizō Kurosawa
Party	Social Democratic	Independent
Popular vote	914,764	777,421
Governor before election
Toshibumi Tanaka
Social Democratic
Elected Governor
Toshibumi Tanaka
Social Democratic

A gubernatorial election was held on 30 April 1951 to elect the Governor of Hokkaido Prefecture.

== Candidates ==
- Toshibumi Tanaka – incumbent governor of Hokkaido Prefecture, age 39.
- Torizō Kurosawa – nicknamed "Father of Japanese Dairy", age 66.

== Results ==
1951 Hokkaido gubernatorial election
Party	Candidate	Votes	%	±%
Social Democratic	Toshibumi Tanaka *	914,764		
Independent	Torizō Kurosawa	777,421		
Turnout		1735826	81.17	
