= Socialist and Communist Joint Struggle (Japan) =

Political strategy in Japan

The Socialist and Communist Joint Struggle (社共共闘, Shakyō kyōtō) refers to the political strategy in which the Japan Socialist Party (JSP; now the Social Democratic Party) and the Japanese Communist Party (JCP) fielded unified candidates and cooperated in elections.

== Overview ==
It became particularly active from the late 1960s, mainly in mayoral elections. It was also more broadly referred to as the "progressive joint struggle" (kakushin kyōtō).

The Democratic Socialist Party (DSP), formed in January 1960 by Diet members who left the JSP, had from the outset advocated anti-communism and rarely cooperated in opposition joint struggles. In the February 1967 Kitakyushu mayoral election, the same month's Kyoto mayoral election, the April 1967 Tokyo gubernatorial election, and the same month's Fukuoka gubernatorial election, the DSP supported unified candidates with the Liberal Democratic Party (LDP). On 22 February of that year, JSP Chairman Kōzō Sasaki stated that "the DSP is a second conservative party," and at an expanded central committee meeting on 5 March he further sharply criticized that "DSP leaders are helping the LDP's efforts to divide the opposition." Of these, the JSP–JCP unified candidates won the Kyoto mayoral and Tokyo gubernatorial elections, but they lost by narrow margins in the 1971 Aichi gubernatorial election, the 1975 and 1979 Hokkaido gubernatorial elections, the 1975 Tachikawa mayoral election, and the same year's Higashikurume mayoral election to LDP–DSP unified candidates.

The nationwide trend of Socialist–Communist joint struggle continued until the late 1970s. After defeats in the two major elections of April 1979—the Hokkaido gubernatorial election and the 1979 Tokyo gubernatorial election—it subsided from the 1980s onward.

== 1950s ==
1950

- April – The Kyoto gubernatorial election involved joint struggle. Torazō Ninagawa, the JSP-endorsed candidate, ran with the recommendation of the All-Kyoto Democratic Front Unification Conference, which included the JCP. He defeated Seiichi Inoue, who was recommended by the Democratic Liberal Party and the Japan Democratic Party, in a one-on-one contest and was elected for the first time. (Joint struggle, Elected)

1958

- July – The Itō mayoral election involved joint struggle. Motokazu Numata, a representative of the Itō Credit Association, ran with the recommendations of the JSP and JCP. He defeated Miyomatsu Maeda, the LDP-endorsed candidate, in a one-on-one contest and was elected for the first time. (Joint struggle, Elected)

1959

- April – The 1959 Hokkaido gubernatorial election was a de facto joint struggle. Setsuji Yokomichi, a member of the House of Representatives from Hokkaido 1st district, ran as the JSP-endorsed candidate. Because Yokomichi's spouse's elder brother was former Central Committee Chairman Eitarō Noro, the JCP provided rear support. Kingo Machimura, also a House of Representatives member from the same Hokkaido 1st district, ran as the LDP-endorsed candidate and defeated Yokomichi and others, winning for the first time. This marked the first postwar conservative prefectural government in Hokkaido. (Joint struggle, Defeated)

== 1960s ==
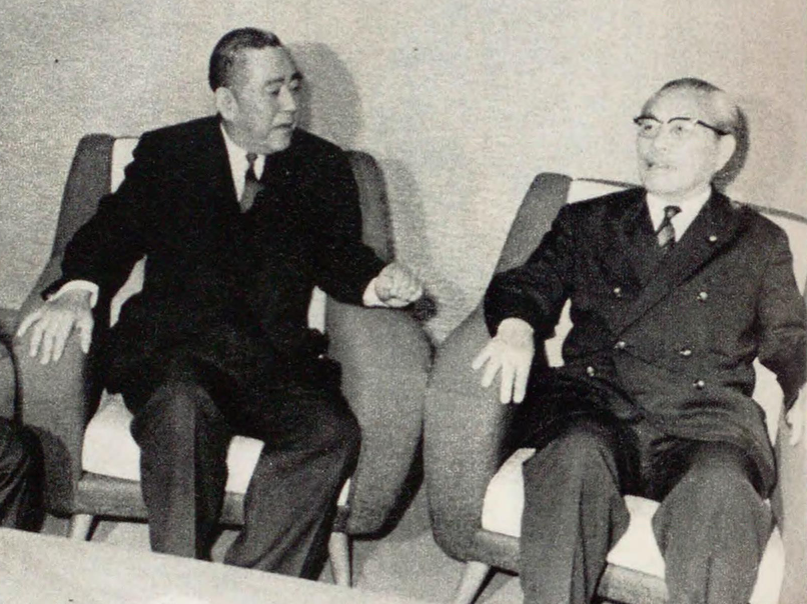
In the 1967 Tokyo gubernatorial election, the DSP aimed to prevent the JCP's advance into Tokyo politics and fielded Masatoshi Matsushita, known as a strong anti-communist. The Liberal Democratic Party also decided to recommend Matsushita to counter the JSP–JCP-recommended candidate Ryokichi Minobe. Prime Minister Eisaku Satō and DSP Chairman Suehiro Nishio hold a strategy meeting.

1960

- 24 January – The founding convention of the Democratic Socialist Party was held at Kudan Kaikan. Diet members who left the JSP to join the DSP numbered 38 in the House of Representatives and 16 in the House of Councillors.
- September – The Fukuoka mayoral election involved joint struggle. Former House of Representatives member Shōko Fukuda ran with the JSP's recommendation and JCP support but was defeated by former Home Ministry bureaucrat Katsuji Sugimoto, recommended by the LDP and DSP. (Joint struggle, Defeated)

1962

- July – The Itō mayoral election involved joint struggle. Incumbent Motokazu Numata ran with the recommendations of the JSP and JCP. He defeated LDP-endorsed Kuniemon Iijima in a one-on-one contest and was re-elected. (Joint struggle, Elected)

1963

- March – The Kitakyushu mayoral election involved joint struggle. Former House of Councillors member Hōsei Yoshida ran as the JSP-endorsed candidate with the JCP's recommendation. He defeated Katsuji Sugimoto, recommended by the LDP and DSP, in a one-on-one contest and was elected for the first time. (Joint struggle, Elected)
- April – The 1963 Tokyo gubernatorial election involved joint struggle. Masaru Sakamoto ran with the recommendations of the JSP, JCP, and DSP but was defeated by incumbent Ryūtarō Azuma, recommended by the LDP. (Joint struggle, Defeated)
- April – The Kawasaki mayoral election saw a split. Former House of Representatives member Hideo Nakajima ran with the JSP's recommendation, while Takeo Konno ran as the JCP-endorsed candidate. Votes were split, and incumbent Fujitarō Kanasashi, recommended by the LDP, won a fifth term (Kanasashi: 141,979 votes; Nakajima: 134,588 votes; Konno: 18,989 votes). (Split, Defeated)

1965

- April – The Nagoya mayoral election involved joint struggle. Former House of Councillors member Shin'ichi Kondō ran as the JSP-endorsed candidate with the JCP's recommendation but was defeated by incumbent Kiyoshi Sugito, recommended by the LDP and DSP. (Joint struggle, Defeated)

1966

- October – The Goshogawara mayoral election involved joint struggle. Former mayor Hisaburō Yamauchi ran with the recommendations of the JSP and JCP but was defeated by incumbent Eizō Sasaki, LDP-endorsed. (Joint struggle, Defeated)
- November – The Yamagata mayoral election involved joint struggle. Former prefectural assembly member Tadao Kanazawa ran as the JSP-endorsed candidate with the JCP's recommendation. He defeated independent conservative Hiroshi Mogi and LDP-endorsed Takeshi Yamamoto and was elected for the first time. (Joint struggle, Elected)

1967

- January – The Ehime gubernatorial election involved joint struggle. Isamu Yuyama ran with the recommendations of the JSP and JCP but was defeated by incumbent Sadamu Hisamatsu, LDP-endorsed. (Joint struggle, Defeated)
- January – The Kōchi mayoral election involved joint struggle. Former House of Councillors member Akira Sakamoto ran as the JSP-endorsed candidate with the JCP's recommendation. He defeated LDP-recommended Mangio Hiromatsu in a one-on-one contest and was elected for the first time. (Joint struggle . Elected)
- February – The Esashi mayoral election saw a split. Kikuzō Satō ran with the recommendations of the JSP and DSP, while Kazuo Konno ran as the JCP-endorsed candidate. Satō defeated incumbent Nagazumi Watanabe and was elected for the first time. (Split)
- 22 February – JSP Chairman Kōzō Sasaki visited Kyoto to support newcomer Kiyoshi Tomii, the JSP–JCP-recommended candidate in the Kyoto mayoral election, and stated at a press conference that "the DSP is a second conservative party." The DSP reacted furiously; upon hearing this, party Secretary-General Eiichi Nishimura retorted, "How dare they insult our party. The JSP is a second Communist Party."
- 23 February – The Kitakyushu mayoral election saw a split. Incumbent Hōsei Yoshida ran as the JSP-endorsed candidate, while Hiroyuki Tadakuma ran with the JCP's recommendation, splitting the vote. Gohei Tani, recommended by the LDP and DSP, was elected for the first time. (Split . Defeated)
- 26 February – The Kyoto mayoral election involved joint struggle. JSP–JCP-recommended Kiyoshi Tomii defeated LDP–DSP-recommended Masafumi Yasugi in a one-on-one contest and was elected for the first time. (Joint struggle . Elected)
- April – The 1967 Tokyo gubernatorial election involved joint struggle. Economist Ryokichi Minobe ran with the recommendations of the JSP and JCP. He defeated Masatoshi Matsushita, recommended by the DSP and LDP, and others, and was elected for the first time. (Joint struggle . Elected)
- April – The Kanagawa gubernatorial election saw a split. Former prefectural assembly member Shirō Takeda ran as the JSP-endorsed candidate, while Shuntarō Watanabe ran as the JCP-endorsed candidate, splitting the vote. Bungo Tsuda, recommended by the LDP, was elected for the first time. (Split . Defeated)
- April – The Fukuoka gubernatorial election involved joint struggle. Incumbent Taichi Uzaki ran as the JSP-endorsed candidate with the JCP's recommendation but was defeated by Hikaru Kamei, recommended by the LDP and DSP. (Joint struggle . Defeated)
- April – The Utsunomiya mayoral election saw a split. JSP-recommended Daihachi Ōnuki and JCP-endorsed Teiichi Kobanawa ran. They were defeated by former prefectural assembly member Yoshiko Koike (male), who ran as the LDP-endorsed candidate. (Note: Yoshiko Koike was male.). (Split . Defeated)
- April – The Kunitachi mayoral election involved joint struggle. Nippon Express employee Kazuo Ishizuka ran as the JSP-endorsed candidate with the JCP's recommendation. He defeated two conservative candidates, Sagenza Sawao and Isao Wada, and was elected for the first time. (Joint struggle . Elected)
- April – The Kawasaki mayoral election saw a split. Teruji Yoshihama ran as the JSP-endorsed candidate, Takeo Konno as the JCP-endorsed candidate, and Yoshiro Kasai as the DSP-endorsed candidate. Votes were split, and incumbent Fujitarō Kanasashi, recommended by the LDP, won a sixth term. (Split . Defeated)
- April – The Hirakata mayoral election involved joint struggle. Tomizō Yamamura ran as the JSP-endorsed candidate with the JCP's recommendation. Incumbent Sōichirō Terashima, a former JSP member, ran with the recommendations of the LDP and DSP. Yamamura defeated Terashima and others and was elected for the first time. (Joint struggle . Elected)
- April – The Takamatsu mayoral election saw a split. Nobuo Waki ran as the JSP-endorsed candidate and Yukio Shimokawa as the JCP-endorsed candidate. Votes were split, and LDP-endorsed Tokusaburō Miyake was elected for the first time. (Split . Defeated)
- October – The Hōya mayoral election involved joint struggle. Akitoshi Harada ran as the JSP-endorsed candidate with the JCP's recommendation and was elected unopposed for the first time. (Joint struggle . Elected)

1968

- February – The Fujisawa mayoral election saw a split. Former city assembly member Shun Hayama ran with the JSP's recommendation, while Kan Abe ran as the JCP-endorsed candidate, splitting the vote. Incumbent Koichirō Kaneko was elected. (Split . Defeated)
- June – The Saitama gubernatorial election involved joint struggle. Yutaka Awaya ran with the recommendations of the JSP, JCP, and DSP but was defeated by incumbent Hiroshi Kurihara, LDP-endorsed. (Joint struggle . Defeated)
- November – The 1st Chief Executive of the Ryukyu Government election involved joint struggle. Educator Chōbyō Yara ran with the support of the JSP, JCP, Okinawa Social Mass Party, and others. He defeated Junji Nishime, endorsed by the Okinawa Liberal Democratic Party, in a de facto one-on-one contest and was elected for the first time. (Joint struggle . Elected)

1969

- January – The Hōya mayoral election saw a split. In the election following Mayor Harada's resignation over a corruption scandal, Tetsuya Tomaru ran as the JSP-endorsed candidate and Hiroshi Ōnami as the JCP-endorsed candidate. LDP-recommended Toshinori Naitō pulled ahead and was elected for the first time. (Split . Defeated)
- February – The Matsumoto mayoral election involved joint struggle. Matsumi Fukazawa ran with the recommendations of the JSP, JCP, and DSP. He defeated incumbent Tokuya Furuhata, LDP-endorsed, in a one-on-one contest and was elected for the first time. (Joint struggle . Elected)
- May – The Tanashi mayoral election involved joint struggle. Masao Kibe ran as the JSP-endorsed candidate with the JCP's recommendation. He defeated two candidates including conservative newcomer and former city assembly member Kanji Kobayashi and was elected for the first time. (Joint struggle . Elected)
- July – The Kokubunji mayoral election saw a split. Nobuo Shioya ran as the JSP-endorsed candidate. He defeated LDP-recommended newcomer Shōdō Takebe and JCP-recommended Akira Okajima and was elected for the first time. (Split)

== Early 1970s ==
1970

- March – The Machida mayoral election involved joint struggle. Katsumasa Ōshita ran as the JSP-endorsed candidate with the JCP's recommendation. He defeated conservative newcomer Shigeharu Kumazawa in a one-on-one contest and was elected for the first time. (Joint struggle . Elected)
- April – The Niigata gubernatorial election involved joint struggle. Former House of Councillors member Zentaro Sugiyama ran with the recommendations of the JSP and JCP but was defeated by incumbent Shirō Watari, LDP-endorsed. (Joint struggle . Defeated)
- August – The Kamakura mayoral election involved joint struggle. Chifuyu Masaki ran with the recommendations of the JSP and JCP. He defeated incumbent Shōichi Yamamoto, LDP-endorsed, and DSP-recommended Yoshio Arisaka, and was elected for the first time. (Joint struggle . Elected)
- November – The Yamagata mayoral election involved joint struggle. Incumbent Tadao Kanazawa ran with the recommendations of the JSP and JCP. He defeated LDP-endorsed Gonnosuke Honda and was re-elected. (Joint struggle . Elected)

1971

- 27 January – DSP Chairman Eiichi Nishimura stated at a press conference that "we will not engage in joint struggle with the Communist Party in the next general election." He also criticized JCP Chairman Kenji Miyamoto's phrase "rallying of anti-LDP forces," saying that "such abstract calls will not gain public support."
- January – The Nara gubernatorial election saw a split. Former House of Representatives member Kazuo Yagi ran with the JSP's recommendation, while Minoru Kobari ran as the JCP-endorsed candidate, splitting the vote. Incumbent Ryōzō Okuda, LDP-endorsed, was elected. (Split . Defeated)
- February – The Aichi gubernatorial election involved joint struggle. Linguist Takeshi Niimura ran with the recommendations of the JSP and JCP but was defeated by incumbent Mikine Kuwahara, recommended by the LDP and DSP. (Joint struggle . Defeated)
- February – The Toyama mayoral election involved joint struggle. Former prefectural assembly member Hideo Kaii ran with the recommendations of the JSP and JCP. The LDP endorsed incumbent Eikichi Minato, but excluded candidate Tadakazu Ishiguro ran as an independent, splitting the conservative vote. In a close race, Kaii was elected for the first time (Kaii: 48,484 votes; Ishiguro: 44,595 votes; Minato: 42,371 votes). (Joint struggle . Elected)
- February – The Kyoto mayoral election involved joint struggle. Former deputy mayor Motomi Funahashi ran with the recommendations of the JSP and JCP. He defeated Eiichi Nagasue, recommended by the DSP and supported by the LDP, and others, and was elected for the first time. (Joint struggle . Elected)
- April – The Hokkaido gubernatorial election involved joint struggle. Shōhei Tsukada ran as the JSP-endorsed candidate with the JCP's recommendation but was defeated by a narrow margin by LDP-endorsed Naohiro Dōgaito. (Joint struggle . Defeated)
- April – The Osaka gubernatorial election involved joint struggle. Osaka City University professor Ryōichi Kuroda ran with the support of the JSP and JCP. He defeated incumbent Yoshisuke Satō, LDP-endorsed, and others, and was elected for the first time. (Joint struggle . Elected)
- April – The Sapporo mayoral election involved joint struggle. Motoi Ōuchi ran with the recommendations of the JSP and JCP but was defeated by a narrow margin by LDP-recommended Takeshi Itagaki. (Joint struggle . Defeated)
- April – The Urawa mayoral election involved joint struggle. Katsue Uchiyama ran with the recommendations of the JSP and JCP but was defeated by incumbent Sōji Aikawa. (Joint struggle . Defeated)
- April – The Kiyose mayoral election involved joint struggle. Former city assembly member Eiichi Sawada ran with the recommendations of the JSP and JCP but was defeated by incumbent Kunizō Shibuya. (Joint struggle . Defeated)
- April – The Kawasaki mayoral election involved joint struggle. Saburō Itō ran with the recommendations of the JSP and JCP and defeated incumbent Fujitarō Kanasashi, recommended by the LDP, winning for the first time. (Joint struggle . Elected)
- April – The Niigata mayoral election involved joint struggle. Tsutomu Wakatsuki ran with the recommendations of the JSP and JCP but was defeated by incumbent Kōtarō Watanabe, LDP-endorsed. (Joint struggle . Defeated)
- April – The Suita mayoral election involved joint struggle. Kazuo Enohara ran with the recommendations of the JSP and JCP. He defeated incumbent Haruo Yamamoto and others and was elected for the first time. (Joint struggle . Elected)
- April – The Takamatsu mayoral election involved joint struggle. Nobuo Waki, who had lost previously, ran with the recommendations of the JSP and JCP. The conservative vote split between independent Michiumi Kamata and LDP-endorsed Minoru Hirose, and Waki was elected for the first time. (Joint struggle . Elected)
- June – The DSP-affiliated monthly magazine Kaikakusha published its June issue. Dōmei Secretary-General Takumi Shigeeda contributed an article reviewing that year's unified local elections, stating that "the essence of the socialist alliance is nothing more than collusion between the JSP left-wing leadership and the Communist Party" and that "the JSP's excessive anti-LDP consciousness easily and excessively causes a tilt toward the Communist Party," criticizing the electoral policies of the JSP and JCP. The editorial department captioned Shigeeda's article "Socialist–Communist Joint Struggle That Erodes Democracy."
- June – The Jōetsu mayoral election saw a split. Former city assembly member Yoshio Ogawa ran with the JSP's recommendation, while Hideyoshi Kamiya ran as the JCP-endorsed candidate, splitting the vote. Motokazu Koyama, who received recommendations from the LDP and DSP and was mayor at the time of the city's incorporation, was elected for the first time (Koyama: 30,714 votes; Ogawa: 28,129 votes; Kamiya: 2,839 votes). (Split . Defeated)
- August – The Tachikawa mayoral election involved joint struggle. Historian Gyōzō Abe ran with the recommendations of the JSP and JCP. He defeated LDP-recommended Yūsuke Manda and was elected for the first time. (Joint struggle . Elected)
- November – The Kōchi gubernatorial election involved joint struggle. Ichirō Ujihara ran with the recommendations of the JSP and JCP and support from the DSP but was defeated by incumbent Masumi Mizobuchi, LDP-endorsed. (Joint struggle . Defeated)

1972

- February – The Fujisawa mayoral election involved joint struggle. Shun Hayama ran with the recommendations of the JSP and JCP. He defeated Keitoku Katō, recommended by the LDP and DSP, in a one-on-one contest and was elected for the first time. (Joint struggle . Elected)
- July – The Saitama gubernatorial election involved joint struggle. Kazuo Hata ran with the recommendations of the JSP, JCP, and DSP. He defeated LDP-endorsed Motomi Ōno and others and was elected for the first time. (Joint struggle . Elected)
- August – The Fujimi mayoral election involved joint struggle. Saburō Yamada ran with the recommendations of the JSP and JCP. He defeated three conservative newcomers and was elected for the first time. (Joint struggle . Elected)
- September – The Ōtsu mayoral election involved joint struggle. Former prefectural assembly member Kōsaburō Yamada ran with the support of the JSP and JCP. He defeated former deputy mayor Ryōhei Inoue, backed by Shiga Governor Kin'ichirō Nozaki, in a one-on-one contest and was elected for the first time. (Joint struggle . Elected)
- October – The Okayama gubernatorial election involved joint struggle. Former Home Affairs Ministry bureaucrat Shirō Nagano ran with the recommendations of the JSP, JCP, Komeito, and DSP. He defeated incumbent Takenori Katō, LDP-endorsed, and was elected for the first time. (Joint struggle . Elected)
- October – The Akishima mayoral election involved joint struggle. Shinobu Sarashima ran with the recommendations of the JSP and JCP but was defeated by incumbent Motoyoshi Shindō, recommended by the LDP. (Joint struggle . Defeated)

1973

- January – The Hōya mayoral election saw a split. Yoshinori Shimizu ran with the JCP's recommendation and DSP support, while Tetsuya Tomaru ran with the JSP's recommendation and Komeito support. Incumbent Naitō defeated Shimizu, Tomaru, and others and was re-elected. (Split . Defeated)
- April – The Hino mayoral election involved joint struggle. Former city assembly member Kimio Morita ran with the recommendations of the JSP, JCP, and Komeito and support from the DSP. He defeated incumbent Furuya and was elected for the first time. (Joint struggle . Elected)
- April – The Nagoya mayoral election involved joint struggle. Nagoya University professor Masao Motoyama ran with the support of the JSP, JCP, and Komeito. He defeated incumbent Kiyoshi Sugito, supported by the LDP and DSP, and others, and was elected for the first time. (Joint struggle . Elected)
- July – The Kokubunji mayoral election involved joint struggle. Incumbent Nobuo Shioya ran with the recommendations of the JSP and JCP. He defeated conservative newcomer Fumio Kami takahara and was re-elected. (Joint struggle . Elected)
- October – The Kushiro mayoral election involved joint struggle. Incumbent Tetsuo Yamaguchi ran as the JSP-endorsed candidate with the JCP's recommendation and Komeito support. He defeated conservative Toshiyuki Wanibuchi and others and was elected to a third term. (Joint struggle . Elected)
- December – The Kishiwada mayoral election involved joint struggle. Noboru Harada ran with the recommendations of the JSP and JCP. He defeated LDP-recommended Yonetarō Nakazawa in a one-on-one contest and was elected for the first time. (Joint struggle . Elected)

1974

- February – The Jōetsu mayoral election involved joint struggle (election following the death of Mayor Motokazu Koyama). Yoshio Ogawa ran with the recommendations of the JSP and JCP and Komeito support but was defeated by former city assembly member Kō Ueki, recommended by the LDP and DSP. (Joint struggle . Defeated)
- March – The Tottori gubernatorial election involved joint struggle. Yoshirō Norimoto ran with the recommendations of the JSP and JCP and Komeito support but was defeated by LDP-recommended Kōzō Hirabayashi. (Joint struggle . Defeated)
- April – The Shizuoka gubernatorial election saw a split. Former deputy governor Minoru Nagahara ran with the recommendations of the JSP, Komeito, and DSP, while Tetsutarō Motoba ran as the JCP-endorsed candidate, splitting the vote. Former House of Councillors member Keizaburō Yamamoto, LDP-endorsed, narrowly pulled ahead and was elected for the first time (Yamamoto: 806,371 votes; Nagahara: 802,090 votes; Motoba: 131,501 votes). (Split . Defeated)
- April – The Niigata gubernatorial election saw a split. Former House of Representatives member Toshiaki Matsuzawa ran as the JSP-endorsed candidate, while Yosaburō Urasawa ran as the JCP-endorsed candidate, splitting the vote. They were defeated by former House of Councillors member Takeo Kimi, endorsed by the LDP. (Split . Defeated)
- April – The Fuchū (Tokyo) mayoral election involved joint struggle. Shinzō Tsuruoka ran with the recommendations of the JSP and JCP but was defeated by incumbent Ryūji Yabe, recommended by the LDP and DSP. (Joint struggle . Defeated)
- June – The Kuroishi mayoral election involved joint struggle. Junji Nakamura ran with the recommendations of the JSP, JCP, Komeito, and Democratic Party. He defeated incumbent Takejirō Takahi, LDP-endorsed, in a one-on-one contest and was elected for the first time. (Joint struggle . Elected)
- July – The Itō mayoral election saw a split. Eiichi Hamano ran with the recommendations of the JSP and Komeito, while Shōtarō Hirasawa ran with the JCP's recommendation, splitting the vote. Incumbent LDP-endorsed Toshirō Inaki won a third term (Inaki: 18,108 votes; Hamano: 11,331 votes; Hirasawa: 8,540 votes). (Split . Defeated)
- July – The Tsu mayoral election saw a split. Shigehiko Yoshikawa ran with the recommendations of the JSP, Komeito, and DSP, while Katsutarō Yamamoto ran as the JCP-endorsed candidate, splitting the vote. Former prefectural assembly member Hatsuhiro Okamura, recommended by the LDP, pulled ahead and was elected for the first time (Okamura: 31,392 votes; Yoshikawa: 29,750 votes; Yamamoto: 8,377 votes). (Split . Defeated)
- August – The Kagawa gubernatorial election involved joint struggle. Former Kagawa University president Tadao Maekawa ran with the recommendations of the JSP, JCP, Komeito, and DSP. He defeated incumbent Masanori Kaneko, LDP-endorsed, and was elected for the first time. (Joint struggle . Elected)
- November – The Shiga gubernatorial election involved joint struggle. Former Yōkaichi mayor Masayoshi Takemura ran with the support of the JSP, JCP, DSP, and Komeito. He defeated incumbent Kin'ichirō Nozaki, recommended by the LDP, in a one-on-one contest and was elected for the first time. (Joint struggle . Elected)
- November – The Asahikawa mayoral election involved joint struggle. Isamu Matsumoto ran with the recommendations of the JSP and JCP and Komeito support. He defeated LDP-recommended Mikio Satō in a one-on-one contest and was elected for the first time. (Joint struggle . Elected)
- November – The Yamagata mayoral election involved joint struggle. Incumbent Tadao Kanazawa ran with the recommendations of the JSP and JCP. He defeated independent conservative Hideyasu Niwa and was elected to a third term. (Joint struggle . Elected)

== Late 1970s ==
1975

- January – The Nara gubernatorial election saw a split. Former House of Representatives member Kazuo Yagi ran with the JSP's recommendation and Komeito support, while Tokuhiro Watanabe ran as the JCP-endorsed candidate, splitting the vote. Incumbent Ryōzō Okuda, recommended by the LDP, was elected. (Split . Defeated)
- February – The Aichi gubernatorial election involved joint struggle. Former House of Representatives member Banjī Naruse ran with the recommendations of the JSP and JCP and Komeito support but was defeated by incumbent Yoshiaki Nakatani, recommended by the LDP and DSP. (Joint struggle . Defeated)
- February – The Fukaya mayoral election involved joint struggle. Kuniichirō Fukuchi ran with the recommendations of the JSP and JCP and Komeito support but was defeated by LDP-recommended Nakaji Koizumi. (Joint struggle . Defeated)
- February – The Toyama mayoral election involved joint struggle. Incumbent Hideo Kaii ran with the recommendations of the JSP, JCP, and DSP and Komeito support. He defeated LDP-endorsed Hisashi Asachi in a one-on-one contest and was re-elected. (Joint struggle . Elected)
- February – The Hiroshima mayoral election involved joint struggle. Following the death of Mayor Setsuno Yamada, Tōru Ōhara resigned as a House of Representatives member to run. He was recommended by the JSP and JCP and supported by Komeito but was defeated by Takeshi Araki, recommended by the LDP and Komeito. (Joint struggle . Defeated)
- March – The Higashikurume mayoral election involved joint struggle. Following the resignation of Mayor Kenkō Fujii, Hiroshi Sakamoto ran with the recommendations of the JSP and JCP but was defeated by Masatoshi Ishizuka, recommended by the LDP and DSP. (Joint struggle . Defeated)
- April – The 1975 Hokkaido gubernatorial election involved joint struggle. Former Asahikawa mayor Kōzō Igarashi ran with the recommendations of the JSP and JCP and Komeito support. Incumbent Naohiro Dōgaito, recommended by the LDP and DSP and supported by the Hokkaido Electric Power labor union, was re-elected, and Igarashi was defeated. (Joint struggle . Defeated)
- April – The 1975 Tokyo gubernatorial election involved joint struggle. Minobe ran with the recommendations of the JSP, JCP, and Komeito. He defeated LDP-recommended Shintarō Ishihara, DSP-recommended Masatoshi Matsushita, and others, winning a third term. (Joint struggle . Elected)
- April – The Saga gubernatorial election involved joint struggle. Former House of Representatives member Issei Ide ran with the recommendations of the JSP, JCP, and DSP and Komeito support but was defeated by incumbent Sunao Ikeda, recommended by the LDP. (Joint struggle . Defeated)
- April – The Fukushima mayoral election involved joint struggle. Takayoshi Abe ran with the recommendations of the JSP and JCP. The conservative vote split between incumbent Tatsuya Satō and former mayor Minoru Satō, but incumbent Tatsuya Satō was re-elected. (Joint struggle . Defeated)
- April – The Natori mayoral election involved joint struggle. Mitsuhito Tachikawa ran with the recommendations of the JSP and JCP and Komeito support but was defeated by incumbent Shōkurō Shōji, supported by the LDP. (Joint struggle . Defeated)
- April – The Niiza mayoral election saw a split. Satsuo Iida ran with the recommendations of the JSP, Komeito, and DSP, while Masao Ishizawa ran with the JCP's recommendation, splitting the vote. LDP-recommended Kiyoshi Kobune was elected for the first time. (Split . Defeated)
- April – The Niigata mayoral election involved joint struggle. Kihachirō Kawakami ran with the recommendations of the JSP and JCP and Komeito support. He narrowly defeated incumbent Kōtarō Watanabe, LDP-endorsed, and was elected for the first time. (Joint struggle . Elected)
- April – The Urawa mayoral election saw a split. Mitsuo Nakamura ran with the recommendations of the JSP and DSP and Komeito support, while Kazuto Sakurai ran with the JCP's recommendation. Votes split between Nakamura and Sakurai, and LDP-recommended Kenkichi Nakagawa was elected for the first time. (Split . Defeated)
- April – The Chiyoda Ward mayoral election involved joint struggle. Former appointed ward mayor Sen'ichi Takahashi ran with the recommendations of the JSP, JCP, and DSP and Komeito support but was defeated by former appointed ward mayor Kageteru Tōyama, recommended by the LDP. (Joint struggle . Defeated)
- April – The Minato Ward mayoral election saw a split. Former ward assembly member Kenshirō Oka ran with the JSP's recommendation and Komeito support, while Masao Sugiura ran as the JCP-endorsed candidate. Votes split between Oka and Sugiura, and LDP-recommended Yukio Kawahara was elected for the first time (Kawahara: 37,330 votes; Oka: 30,684 votes; Sugiura: 7,756 votes). (Split . Defeated)
- April – The Shinjuku Ward mayoral election involved joint struggle. Yoshinaga Sugawara ran with the recommendations of the JSP and JCP but was defeated by Katsutada Yamamoto, recommended by the LDP. (Joint struggle . Defeated)
- April – The Shinagawa Ward mayoral election involved joint struggle. Former appointed ward mayor Eitarō Taga ran with the recommendations of the JSP, JCP, and DSP and Komeito support. He defeated two candidates including LDP-recommended Tatsuo Nagai and was elected for the first time. (Joint struggle . Elected)
- April – The Setagaya Ward mayoral election involved joint struggle. Keiji Ōba ran with the recommendations of the JSP, JCP, and DSP and Komeito support. He defeated former appointed ward mayor Yasufusa Sano, recommended by the LDP, and minor candidate Iwao Takada, and was elected for the first time (Ōba: 129,894 votes; Sano: 123,803 votes; Takada: 4,231 votes). (Joint struggle . Elected)
- April – The Shibuya Ward mayoral election saw a split. Shigeru Kitada ran with the recommendations of the JSP and DSP and Komeito support, while Sanrō Habuchi ran as the JCP-endorsed candidate, splitting the vote. LDP-recommended Fusazō Amano defeated runner-up Kitada by 70 votes and was elected for the first time (Amano: 38,966 votes; Kitada: 38,896 votes; Habuchi: 8,863 votes). (Split . Defeated)
- April – The Nakano Ward mayoral election involved joint struggle. Former appointed ward mayor Shōji Ōuchi ran with the recommendations of the JSP and JCP and Komeito support. He defeated two newcomers, Shōji Kondō and Hiroshi Tanaka, and was elected for the first time. (Joint struggle . Elected)
- April – The Suginami Ward mayoral election involved joint struggle. Jūman'o Oka ran with the recommendations of the JSP and JCP but was defeated by former appointed ward mayor Kiichirō Kikuchi, recommended by the LDP and DSP. (Joint struggle . Defeated)
- April – The Kita Ward mayoral election saw a split. Eiji Itō ran with the recommendations of the JSP and DSP and Komeito support, while Kōhei Iida ran as the JCP-endorsed candidate. Votes split between Itō and Iida, and LDP-recommended Masachiyo Kobayashi was elected for the first time. (Split . Defeated)
- April – The Nerima Ward mayoral election involved joint struggle. Former appointed ward mayor Kensuke Tabata ran with the recommendations of the JSP, JCP, and DSP and Komeito support. He defeated Hideyo Masaki, recommended by the LDP, in a one-on-one contest and was elected for the first time. (Joint struggle . Elected)
- April – The Koganei mayoral election involved joint struggle. Incumbent Tomoyoshi Nagatoshi ran with the recommendations of the JSP and JCP. Former city employee Heiju Hoshino ran with the LDP's recommendation, and Masao Teramoto with the recommendations of Komeito and the DSP. Results were Nagatoshi: 15,837 votes; Hoshino: 15,285 votes; Teramoto: 8,836 votes, and Nagatoshi was re-elected. (Joint struggle . Elected)
- April – The Suita mayoral election saw a split. Incumbent Kazuo Enohara ran with the JCP's recommendation. Conservative newcomer Takayoshi Hada received recommendations from the LDP, Komeito, and DSP, as well as the JSP. Results were Enohara: 55,564 votes; Hada: 55,041 votes, and Enohara was re-elected. (Split)
- April – The Kagoshima mayoral election saw a split. Incumbent Toshio Sueyoshi ran with the JSP's recommendation and Komeito support, while Kōichi Nakama ran as the JCP-endorsed candidate. Votes split between Sueyoshi and Nakama, and LDP-recommended Yasuhide Yamanokuchi was elected for the first time. (Split . Defeated)
- August – The Tachikawa mayoral election involved joint struggle. Incumbent Gyōzō Abe ran with the recommendations of the JSP and JCP but was defeated by Shishiura Kishi, recommended by the LDP and DSP. (Joint struggle . Defeated)
- August – The Tondabayashi mayoral election involved joint struggle. Jirō Uchida ran with the JCP's recommendation and JSP support. He defeated incumbent Kiyoshi Nishioka in a one-on-one contest and was elected for the first time. (Joint struggle . Elected)

1976

- July – The Natori mayoral election involved joint struggle. Election following the resignation of Mayor Shōkurō Shōji for health reasons. Yasuji Ōtomo ran with the recommendations of the JSP and JCP. He narrowly defeated Tsugio Ishikawa, recommended by the DSP and supported by the LDP, and was elected for the first time. (Joint struggle . Elected)
- August – The Fujimi mayoral election involved joint struggle. Incumbent Saburō Yamada ran with the recommendations of the JSP and JCP. He defeated LDP-recommended Keishin Doi in a one-on-one contest and was re-elected. (Joint struggle . Elected)
- October – The Akishima mayoral election involved joint struggle. Shinobu Sarashima, who had lost previously, ran with the recommendations of the JSP and JCP. Katsuo Kobayashi ran with the LDP's recommendation and Kazuo Hirahata with the DSP's recommendation. Sarashima defeated both and was elected for the first time. (Joint struggle . Elected)

1977

- January – The Hōya mayoral election involved joint struggle. Tetsuya Tomaru ran with the recommendations of the JSP and JCP. In this election the LDP and DSP recommended Yasuji Okamura, causing a conservative split with incumbent Toshinori Naitō. Tomaru succeeded on his third attempt and was elected for the first time. (Joint struggle . Elected)
- April – The Nagoya mayoral election involved joint struggle. Motoyama ran with the support of the JSP and JCP. He defeated Akemi Hibino, supported by the LDP, Komeito, and DSP, and others, and was re-elected. (Joint struggle . Elected)
- July – The House of Councillors election · Miyazaki at-large district involved joint struggle. The JCP withdrew its candidate and unified behind incumbent JSP member Kikuo Toda, but he was defeated by LDP newcomer Buichi Ōishi. (Joint struggle . Defeated)
- October – The Kushiro mayoral election involved joint struggle. Incumbent Tetsuo Yamaguchi ran as the JSP-endorsed candidate with the JCP's recommendation but was defeated by Toshiyuki Wanibuchi, recommended by the DSP, supported by Komeito, and backed by the LDP. (Joint struggle . Defeated)
- December – The Sōma mayoral election involved joint struggle. Shigeru Konno ran with the recommendations of the JSP and JCP. He defeated incumbent Tadao Hamana, recommended by the LDP, and two other candidates, and was elected for the first time. (Joint struggle . Elected)

1978

- April – The Niigata gubernatorial election involved joint struggle. Former Sanjō mayor Toshio Inamura ran with the recommendations of the JSP and JCP but was defeated by incumbent Takeo Kimi, LDP-endorsed. (Joint struggle . Defeated)
- April – The Kyoto gubernatorial election saw a split. Votes split between JCP-recommended Toshimasa Sugimura and Yamada Yoshiharu, recommended by the JSP and Komeito and supported by the DSP. As a result, LDP-recommended Yukio Hayashida was elected for the first time. (Split . Defeated)
- April – The Fuchū mayoral election involved joint struggle. Kōji Hayakawa ran with the recommendations of the JSP and JCP but was defeated by incumbent Ryūji Yabe, recommended by the LDP and DSP. (Joint struggle . Defeated)
- June – The Kuroishi mayoral election involved joint struggle. Incumbent Junji Nakamura ran with the recommendations of the JSP, JCP, and New Liberal Club. He narrowly defeated Hiromichi Narumi, recommended by the LDP, DSP, and Social Democratic Federation, and was re-elected (Nakamura: 12,951 votes; Narumi: 12,847 votes). (Joint struggle . Elected)
- August – The Ōmiya mayoral election involved joint struggle. Takeo Oshida ran with the recommendations of the JSP and JCP but was defeated by lawyer Ryūji Mabashi, recommended by the LDP, DSP, Komeito, New Liberal Club, and Social Democratic Federation. (Joint struggle . Defeated)
- August – The Kamakura mayoral election involved joint struggle. Incumbent Chifuyu Masaki ran with the recommendations of the JSP, JCP, and Revolutionary Liberal Union. Treasurer Takashi Watanabe under the Masaki administration rebelled and ran with the recommendations of the LDP, DSP, and New Liberal Club. Masaki was defeated by Watanabe in a one-on-one contest (Watanabe: 37,948 votes; Masaki: 33,801 votes). (Joint struggle . Defeated)
- November – The Asahikawa mayoral election involved joint struggle. Incumbent Isamu Matsumoto ran with the recommendations of the JSP and JCP and Komeito support but was defeated by former city assembly member Tōru Bandō, recommended by the LDP, and left office after one term. (Joint struggle . Defeated)
- November – The Higashikurume mayoral election involved joint struggle. Following the resignation of Mayor Masatoshi Ishizuka, Kōjirō Itō ran with the recommendations of the JSP and JCP. He defeated two candidates including Tadashi Yoneda, supported by the LDP, and was elected for the first time. (Joint struggle . Elected)
- November – The Kōchi mayoral election involved joint struggle. Former deputy mayor Tatsuo Yokoyama ran with the recommendations of the JSP, DSP, and Komeito and support from the JCP. He defeated LDP-recommended Hajime Umehara in a one-on-one contest and was elected for the first time. (Joint struggle . Elected)

1979

- February – The Esashi mayoral election involved joint struggle. Kikuo Kikuchi ran with the JSP's recommendation and JCP support. He defeated incumbent Nagazumi Watanabe, recommended by the LDP and supported by the DSP, by 243 votes and was elected for the first time. (Joint struggle . Elected)
- April – The 1979 Hokkaido gubernatorial election involved joint struggle. Kōzō Igarashi again ran with the recommendations of the JSP and JCP and Komeito support but was defeated as incumbent Naohiro Dōgaito, recommended by the LDP and DSP, won a third term. (Joint struggle . Defeated)
- April – The 1979 Tokyo gubernatorial election involved joint struggle. Kaoru Ōta ran with the recommendations of the JSP and JCP. Votes split between Ōta and Yoshikata Asō, who resigned as a House of Representatives member to run, and Shunichi Suzuki, recommended by the LDP, Komeito, and DSP, was elected for the first time. (Joint struggle . Defeated)
- April – The Kunitachi mayoral election involved joint struggle. Kazuo Ishizuka sought a fourth term with the recommendations of the JSP, JCP, and Revolutionary Liberal Union but was defeated by former Tokyo metropolitan employee Kiyoshi Tani, recommended by the LDP, DSP, and New Liberal Club and supported by Komeito. (Joint struggle . Defeated)
- April – The Fukushima mayoral election involved joint struggle. Former deputy mayor Jō Kawarada ran with the recommendations of the JSP and JCP. He defeated incumbent Tatsuya Satō, recommended by the LDP and DSP and supported by Komeito, and was elected for the first time. (Joint struggle . Elected)
- April – The Kōtō Ward mayoral election involved joint struggle. Yasuo Ogura ran with the recommendations of the JSP and JCP but was defeated by incumbent Gunji Komatsuzaki, recommended by the LDP, Komeito, and DSP. (Joint struggle . Defeated)
- April – The Nakano Ward mayoral election involved joint struggle. Former Tokyo metropolitan assembly member Yoshimichi Aoyama ran with the recommendations of the JSP and JCP. He narrowly defeated Minoru Sakuma, recommended by the LDP, Komeito, and DSP, and was elected for the first time. (Joint struggle . Elected)
- April – The Kita Ward mayoral election involved joint struggle. Susumu Nambara ran with the recommendations of the JSP and JCP but was defeated by incumbent Masachiyo Kobayashi, recommended by the LDP and Komeito. (Joint struggle . Defeated)
- April – The Musashino mayoral election involved joint struggle. Former deputy mayor Masanobu Fujimoto ran with the recommendations of the JSP and JCP. He defeated Minoru Fukuhara, recommended by the LDP and supported by Komeito, and others, and was elected for the first time. (Joint struggle . Elected)
- April – The Mitaka mayoral election involved joint struggle. Incumbent Sadao Sakamoto ran with the recommendations of the JSP and JCP. He defeated Den'ichirō Itō, recommended by the LDP and supported by Komeito and the DSP, in a one-on-one contest and was re-elected. (Joint struggle . Elected)
- April – The Koganei mayoral election involved joint struggle. Incumbent Tomoyoshi Nagatoshi ran with the recommendations of the JSP and JCP. Heiju Hoshino, who had lost previously, ran again with the LDP's recommendation and defeated Nagatoshi in a one-on-one contest, winning for the first time. (Joint struggle . Defeated)
- April – The Onomichi mayoral election involved joint struggle. Lawyer Tōhei Hakuta ran with the recommendations of the JSP and JCP. He defeated two conservative candidates and was elected for the first time. (Joint struggle . Elected)

== 1980s ==
1980

- 10 January – The Japan Socialist Party and Komeito concluded an agreement aiming for a coalition government (commonly known as the "JSP–Komeito agreement"). This clarified the JSP–Komeito–DSP line, the LDP–Komeito–DSP line, and the exclusion of the Japanese Communist Party, becoming a trigger for the collapse of Socialist–Communist joint struggle. The JCP had at one time attempted coordination with Komeito's parent organization, Soka Gakkai, but failed.

1981

- July – The Kokubunji mayoral election involved joint struggle. Incumbent Nobuo Shioya ran with the recommendations of the JSP, JCP, Social Democratic Federation, and Revolutionary Liberal Union but was defeated by a margin of 65 votes by former city agricultural cooperative managing director Yoshio Honda, recommended by the LDP, Komeito, DSP, and New Liberal Club (Honda: 19,403 votes; Shioya: 19,338 votes). (Joint struggle . Defeated)

1982

- April – The Niigata gubernatorial election involved joint struggle. Lawyer Tomio Sakagami ran with the recommendations of the JSP and JCP but was defeated by incumbent Takeo Kimi, LDP-endorsed. (Joint struggle . Defeated)
- July – The Ōmiya mayoral election involved joint struggle. Teizō Miwa ran with the recommendations of the JSP and JCP but was defeated by incumbent Ryūji Mabashi, recommended by the LDP, DSP, Komeito, New Liberal Club, and Social Democratic Federation. (Joint struggle . Defeated)
- July – The Itō mayoral election involved joint struggle. Former city assembly member Shōzō Serizawa ran with the recommendations of the JSP, JCP, and New Liberal Club. He narrowly defeated LDP-endorsed Kan'ichi Ishikawa and was elected for the first time (Serizawa: 18,606 votes; Ishikawa: 18,352 votes). (Joint struggle . Elected)
- October – The Kōchi mayoral election involved joint struggle. Incumbent Tatsuo Yokoyama ran with the recommendations of the JSP and JCP. He defeated Yukiharu Ōmachi, recommended by the LDP, Komeito, and DSP, in a one-on-one contest and was re-elected. (Joint struggle . Elected)

1983

- April – The Fukuoka gubernatorial election involved joint struggle. Hachi Ōkuda ran with the recommendations of the JSP, JCP, and various citizens' alliances. He defeated incumbent Hikaru Kamei, recommended by the LDP and DSP, and was elected for the first time. (Joint struggle . Elected)
- April – The Nakano Ward mayoral election involved joint struggle. Incumbent Yoshimichi Aoyama ran with the recommendations of the JSP and JCP. He defeated Heiji Shimamura, recommended by the LDP and Komeito, in a one-on-one contest and was re-elected. (Joint struggle . Elected)
- April – The Suginami Ward mayoral election involved joint struggle. Makoto Fujii ran with the recommendations of the JSP and JCP. He faced two candidates—former deputy mayor Ryōkichi Matsuda, recommended by the LDP, Komeito, DSP, and New Liberal Club, and Hisayoshi Hosoki (younger brother of Kazuko Hosoki)—but was defeated by Matsuda. (Joint struggle . Defeated)

1984

- February – The Fujisawa mayoral election involved joint struggle. Shun Hayama ran with the recommendations of the JSP, JCP, and Social Democratic Federation. He narrowly defeated Sakae Yamada, recommended by the LDP, Komeito, DSP, and New Liberal Club, and was elected. (Joint struggle . Elected)

1985

- October – The Kushiro mayoral election involved joint struggle. Akihiro Nishida ran with the JSP's recommendation and JCP support but was defeated by incumbent Toshiyuki Wanibuchi, recommended by the LDP, Komeito, DSP, and New Liberal Club. (Joint struggle . Defeated)

1986

- June – The Nakano Ward mayoral election involved joint struggle. In the election following the death of second-term mayor Yoshimichi Aoyama, former deputy mayor Yoshikazu Kamiyama ran with the recommendations of the JSP and JCP. He defeated Tomoo Miyagawa, recommended by the LDP, Komeito, and DSP, and three other candidates, and was elected for the first time. (Joint struggle . Elected)
- July – The Itō mayoral election involved joint struggle. Incumbent Shōzō Serizawa ran with the recommendations of the JSP, JCP, and Social Democratic Federation and support from Komeito. He defeated LDP-recommended Kazuo Ihara and was re-elected. (Joint struggle . Elected)

1987

- April – The Nerima Ward mayoral election involved joint struggle. Former president of the Japan League of Women Voters Ryō Motoo ran with the recommendations of the JSP, JCP, and Social Democratic Federation but was defeated by Saburō Iwanami, recommended by the LDP, Komeito, and DSP. (Joint struggle . Defeated)

1988

- January – The Hachiōji mayoral election involved joint struggle. Kazuya Yamada ran with the recommendations of the JSP and JCP but was defeated by incumbent Shigeo Hatano, recommended by the LDP, Komeito, and DSP. (Joint struggle . Defeated)

1989

- April – The Niigata gubernatorial election saw a split. Former House of Councillors member Yutaka Shitomi ran with the recommendations of the JSP and Social Democratic Federation, while Akira Nagasaki ran with the JCP's recommendation, splitting the vote. They were defeated by former Home Affairs Ministry bureaucrat Kiyoshi Kaneko, recommended by the LDP (Kaneko: 658,086 votes; Shitomi: 611,986 votes; Nagasaki: 140,161 votes). (Split . Defeated)
- August – The Kyoto mayoral election saw a split. Votes split between JCP-recommended Manpei Kimura and JSP-recommended Susumu Nakano. Tomoyuki Tanabe, recommended by Komeito and the DSP and supported by the LDP, narrowly defeated second-place Kimura by 321 votes and was elected for the first time. (Split . Defeated)
- October – The Kamakura mayoral election saw a split. Shōichi Umezawa ran with the JSP's recommendation, while Kunihiko Morita ran with the recommendations of the JCP and Seikatsu Club Network, splitting the vote. Incumbent Isao Nakanishi, recommended by the LDP, DSP, and Progressive Party, was re-elected. (Split . Defeated)

== 1990s ==
1990

- July – The Itō mayoral election involved joint struggle. Incumbent Shōzō Serizawa ran with the recommendations of the JSP, JCP, and Social Democratic Federation and support from Komeito and the DSP. He narrowly defeated LDP-recommended Kazuo Ihara by 58 votes and won a third term (Serizawa: 20,495 votes; Ishikawa: 20,437 votes). (Joint struggle . Elected)

1991

- April – The Kunitachi mayoral election involved joint struggle. Masafumi Katō ran with the recommendations of the JSP and JCP but was defeated by newcomer Ariyuki Saeki, recommended by the LDP, Komeito, and DSP. (Joint struggle . Defeated)

1993

- October – The Kamakura mayoral election involved joint struggle. Ken Takeuchi ran with the support of the JSP and JCP. He defeated Sakigake-recommended Shōji Nakamura and incumbent Isao Nakanishi, recommended by the LDP and DSP, and was elected for the first time (Takeuchi: 27,544 votes; Nakamura: 21,870 votes; Nakanishi: 20,365 votes). (Joint struggle . Elected)

1994

- July – The Itō mayoral election involved joint struggle. Incumbent Shōzō Serizawa ran with the recommendations of the JSP and JCP and support from Komeito. Conservatives split between LDP-recommended Tōichirō Suzuki and Japan Renewal Party–Japan New Party-recommended Hikaru Kubota, but Suzuki was elected for the first time. (Joint struggle . Defeated)

1996

- 19 January – The Japan Socialist Party renamed itself the "Social Democratic Party".

1999

- April – The Kunitachi mayoral election involved joint struggle. Former city assembly member Kōko Uehara ran with the recommendations of the SDP, JCP, and Tokyo Seikatsu Club Network. She defeated incumbent Ariyuki Saeki, recommended by the LDP and Liberal Party and supported by Komeito, and was elected for the first time (Uehara: 15,942 votes; Saeki: 14,691 votes). (Joint struggle . Elected)

== 2000s ==
In the 2000s, debate on constitutional revision intensified. Both the SDP (successor to the JSP) and the JCP opposed revision of Article 9 of the Constitution of Japan and other provisions, but opposition votes flowed to the Democratic Party of Japan (DPJ). The SDP continued to lose seats, and the JCP temporarily fell below 10 seats, reaching a number insufficient for independent party leader debates in the National Diet. (Note: The JCP gained 10 or more seats in the 23rd regular election of members of the House of Councillors and the 47th general election of members of the House of Representatives, enabling party leader debates.) As a result, constitutionalist forces were placed at a disadvantage. Voices therefore rose, including among JCP supporters, that the two constitutionalist parties (JCP and SDP) should cooperate in elections.

The only electoral districts in which Socialist–Communist joint struggle occurred during the 2000s were Okinawa 2nd district (for Kantoku Teruya) and the Okinawa at-large district (for Keiko Itokazu).

On 20 January 2006, when the JCP's new leadership paid a courtesy visit to the SDP, Chairman Kazuo Shii stated, "We hope to develop cooperative relations between the two parties in promoting the defense of the Constitution." In response, SDP leader Mizuho Fukushima replied, "There is no hesitation whatsoever regarding joint struggle between the two parties both inside and outside the Diet." Against this background, on 23 January Chairman Shii submitted a written request for talks on Socialist–Communist joint struggle addressed to leader Fukushima, and the SDP also showed a welcoming attitude. However, during the October unified by-elections, SDP House of Representatives member Kiyomi Tsujimoto campaigned for a DPJ candidate without concluding a policy agreement and showed no intention of joint struggle with the JCP. Electoral cooperation that set aside differences on constitutional issues with the Democratic Party also took place, and joint constitutional defense remained difficult. In a New Year's interview with NHK in 2007, leader Fukushima used the phrasing employed when cooperating with Komeito in the 1980s—"to prevent the Democratic Party from moving to the right"—and indicated an intention to promote electoral cooperation with the DPJ. Following the results of the 2007 House of Councillors election, in which the DPJ became the largest party in the upper house, the opposition talks called by the SDP involved only three parties—the DPJ, People's New Party, and SDP—and the JCP was excluded from the outset.

In the 45th general election of members of the House of Representatives held in 2009, the SDP entered the campaign advocating a coalition with the DPJ. In several single-member districts, the DPJ backed SDP candidates and the SDP backed DPJ candidates. As a result, the Liberal Democratic Party suffered a historic defeat, and a DPJ-led change of government was realized. In response, the DPJ and SDP formally established a coalition government (the DPJ–SDP–PNP coalition government) including the People's New Party. The JCP took the position of a constructive opposition toward this change of government and continued to uphold its constitutionalist stance in a different direction from the SDP, which had become a ruling party.

In the 47th general election of members of the House of Representatives held in 2014, Okinawa Governor Takeshi Onaga formed "All Okinawa" as an anti-base force, in which both the JCP and SDP participated. As a result, JCP candidate Seiken Akamine in Okinawa 1st district won a single-member district for the first time, and Teruya in Okinawa 2nd district won a fifth term. In Okinawa 3rd district and Okinawa 4th district, both parties refrained from fielding their own candidates and supported anti-base candidates, who were elected.

Examples of the JCP supporting SDP-affiliated candidates in the 2000s were limited to Tadashi Ōta in the Tokushima gubernatorial election and Mitsuko Tōmon in the Okinawa City mayoral election. There were no examples of the SDP as a party supporting JCP-affiliated candidates; only Nobuto Hosaka personally supported Yutaka Yano in the Komae mayoral election (as an organization it was free voting, and Kei Ishizaka, known as an SDP supporter, supported the opposing candidate recommended by the LDP, Komeito, and DSP). However, when the DPJ or regional parties such as the Tokyo Seikatsu Club Network engaged in joint struggle with the JCP, the SDP, positioned in between (though without major leadership), often joined as well (common in Tokyo's suburban cities such as Musashino, Nishitokyo, Kodaira, and Chōfu). In these cases the JCP often supported candidates from the former JSP or Social Democratic Federation factions within the DPJ, which can be regarded as a transformed form of Socialist–Communist joint struggle.

Meanwhile, regarding repeated requests from the New Socialist Party for the establishment of a contact window for electoral joint struggle, the JCP on 7 January 2006 refused, stating that "the conditions for joint struggle do not exist," on the grounds that the New Socialist Party named and criticized the JCP as a target in its basic documents. However, in local mayoral elections, particularly in the Kansai region (e.g., Junzō Nagao in the Higashiōsaka mayoral election and Shōji Umeda in the Osaka gubernatorial election), there were many cases in which both parties recommended or supported the same candidate. In Chōsei Village, the JCP expressed support for New Socialist Party member Toshio Ishii as village mayor.

== 2010s and after ==
In the 2012 Tokyo gubernatorial election, both the JCP and SDP supported Kenji Utsunomiya, marking the first time in 29 years that the two parties backed the same candidate in a Tokyo gubernatorial election; however, he was heavily defeated by Naoki Inose. In the 2014 Tokyo gubernatorial election, the JCP early on decided to recommend Utsunomiya, while the SDP also explored support for Morihiro Hosokawa but ultimately continued to recommend Utsunomiya. Results showed a slight increase from the previous election, but he was again defeated by Yōichi Masuzoe. In the 2014 Okinawa gubernatorial election, the parties recommended Takeshi Onaga, who had left the LDP and opposed the relocation of Marine Corps Air Station Futenma to Henoko, together with the Naha City Assembly New Wind Association (from which LDP members had been expelled), and secured his election. In the Naha mayoral election as well, they recommended Mikiko Shiroma together with the New Wind Association and secured her election.

=== Five-party agreement on opposition joint struggle ===
After the Third Abe Cabinet enacted the security legislation, the parties solidified a policy of joint struggle from a constitutionalist standpoint. At the SDP party convention held on 20 February 2016, Japanese Communist Party Chairman Kazuo Shii participated as a guest. This was the first time a JCP executive had been invited to an SDP party convention, including during the JSP era. At the 27th Congress of the Japanese Communist Party held on 15 January 2017, Tadatomo Yoshida participated as a guest together with Democratic Party Acting Representative Jun Azumi, Liberal Party Representative Ichirō Ozawa, and House of Councillors parliamentary group Okinawa no Kaze member Keiko Itokazu. This was the first time executives from other parties had participated in a JCP party congress.

In the 2016 Niigata gubernatorial election, the JCP and SDP, together with the Liberal Party, recommended independent candidate Ryūichi Yoneyama and secured his election.

=== Left-wing bloc ===
Prior to the 51st general election of members of the House of Representatives in 2026, House of Representatives members of the Constitutional Democratic Party and Komeito merged to form the Centrist Reform Union. This caused the collapse of electoral cooperation between the Constitutional Democratic Party and the Japanese Communist Party that had previously occurred in some regions. The Japanese Communist Party formed electoral cooperation with the SDP and Reiwa Shinsengumi, the so-called "left-wing bloc," but the election results saw seat losses for each party.

== Bibliography ==
- Nihon Seiji Nenkan 1960-nenban. Sekai Shoin. 10 April 1960.
- Kōsen kuchō jidai no hajimari. Tokyo Metropolitan Government Research Association. 1 February 1976.
- Nihon no Rekidai Shichō Dai-1-kan. Rekidai Chiji Hensankai. 15 November 1983.
- Nihon no Rekidai Shichō Dai-2-kan. Rekidai Chiji Hensankai. 10 November 1984.
- Nihon no Rekidai Shichō Dai-3-kan. Rekidai Chiji Hensankai. 10 May 1985.
