= 1959 Hokkaido gubernatorial election =

Election for Governor of Hokkaido

← 1955	23 April 1959	1963 →
- Turnout: 80.94
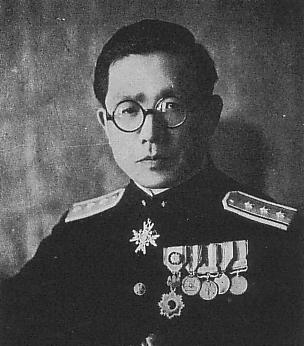
Nominee	Kingo Machimura	Setsuo Yokomichi	Shun'yo Oda
Party	LDP	Social Democratic	Minor party
Popular vote	1,092,456	963,603	13,370
Governor before election
Toshibumi Tanaka
Social Democratic
Elected Governor
Kingo Machimura
LDP

A gubernatorial election was held on 23 April 1959 to elect the Governor of Hokkaido Prefecture.

== Candidates ==
- Kingo Machimura - former Governor of Niigata and Toyama prefectures, age 58.
- Setsuo Yokomichi - member of the House of Representatives, age 48.
- Shun'yo Oda - artist and perennial candidate, age 52.

== Results ==
1959 Hokkaido gubernatorial election
Party	Candidate	Votes	%	±%
LDP	Kingo Machimura	1,092,456		
Social Democratic	Setsuo Yokomichi	963,603		
Minor party	Shun'yo Oda	13,370		
Turnout		2,120,389	80.94	
