= 1963 Hokkaido gubernatorial election =

Election for Governor of Hokkaido

← 1959	17 April 1963	1967 →
- Turnout: 79.80
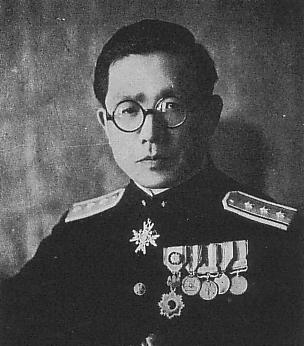
Nominee	Kingo Machimura	Tetsuo Ara	Jin Nishidate
Party	LDP	Social Democratic	JCP
Popular vote	1,393,352	753,480	34,064
Nominee	Issui Maekawa
Party	Independent
Popular vote	12,178
Governor before election
Kingo Machimura
LDP
Elected Governor
Kingo Machimura
LDP

A gubernatorial election was held on 17 April 1963 to elect the Governor of Hokkaido Prefecture.

== Candidates ==
- Tetsuo Ara (荒哲夫, Ara Tetsuo), age 57.
- Kingo Machimura - incumbent governor of Hokkaido prefecture, age 62.
- Issui Maekawa (前川一水, Maekawa Issui), age 52.
- Jin Nishidate (西舘仁, Nishidate Jin), age 60.

== Results ==
19 Hokkaido gubernatorial election
Party	Candidate	Votes	%	±%
LDP	Kingo Machimura *	1,393,352		
Social Democratic	Tetsuo Ara	753,480		
JCP	Jin Nishidate	34,064		
Independent	Issui Maekawa	12,178		
Turnout		2,244,227	79.80	
