= 1979 Hokkaido gubernatorial election =

Election for Governor of Hokkaido

- 8 April 1979
- Turnout: 82.41%
Nominee	Naohiro Dōgakinai	Kozo Igarashi	Nodoka Sakamoto
Party	Independent	Independent	Independent
Popular vote	1,732,374	1,310,233	14,733
Governor before election
Naohiro Dōgakinai
Independent
Elected Governor
Naohiro Dōgakinai
Independent

A gubernatorial election was held on 8 April 1979 to elect the Governor of Hokkaido Prefecture.

== Candidates ==
- Naohiro Dōgakinai - incumbent governor of Hokkaido Prefecture, age 64
- Kozo Igarashi - former mayor of Asahikawa, Hokkaidō and candidate in the 1975 Hokkaido gubernatorial election, age 53
- Nodoka Sakamoto (坂本和, Sakamoto Nodoka) - company president, age 45

== Results ==
1979 Hokkaido gubernatorial election
Party	Candidate	Votes	%	±%
Independent	Naohiro Dōgakinai *	1,732,374		
Independent	Kozo Igarashi	1,310,233		
Independent	Nodoka Sakamoto	14,733		
Turnout		3,081,652	82.41	
