= 1947 Hokkaido gubernatorial election =

Election for Governor of Hokkaido

Nominee	Toshibumi Tanaka	Eiji Arima
Party	Social Democratic	Democratic
Popular vote	555,862	476,727
Elected Governor
Toshibumi Tanaka
Social Democratic

A gubernatorial election was held on 5 April 1947 and 16 April 1947 to elect the Governor of Hokkaido Prefecture. Toshibumi Tanaka defeated Eiji Arima after a six-candidate primary to become the prefecture's first democratically elected governor.

== Candidates ==
- Toshibumi Tanaka – Chairman of the Hokkaido Government Employee Union, age 35.
- Eiji Arima – member of the House of Representatives, age 65.
- Hidetoshi Tomabechi – member of the House of Representatives, age 64.
- Chōji Hase – member of the House of Representatives, age 45.
- Tsuyoshi Iwasa (岩佐劯, Iwasa Tsuyoshi), age 46, represented the Japan Democratic Patriotic Labor Party (日本民主主義愛國労働党)
- Kikukura Samo (佐茂菊藏, Samo Kikukura), age 53.

== Results ==
=== Primary ===
1947 Hokkaido gubernatorial election: primary
Party	Candidate	Votes	%	±%
Social Democratic	Toshibumi Tanaka	384,770		
Democratic	Eiji Arima	304,524		
Independent	Hidetoshi Tomabechi	259,126		
Independent	Chōji Hase	123,510		
Japan Democratic Patriotic Labor Party	Tsuyoshi Iwasa	35,783		
Independent	Kikukura Samo	11,286		
Turnout		1,203,017	68.20	

=== Election ===
1947 Hokkaido gubernatorial election final
Party	Candidate	Votes	%	±%
Social Democratic	Toshibumi Tanaka	555,862		
Democratic	Eiji Arima	476,727		
Turnout		1,043,816	59.39	
