= 1955 Hokkaido gubernatorial election =

Election for Governor of Hokkaido

- 23 April 1955
- Turnout: 77.86%
Nominee	Toshibumi Tanaka	Sanji Nishikawa
Party	Independent	Independent
Popular vote	1,151,194	648,213
Governor before election
Toshibumi Tanaka
Social Democratic
Elected Governor
Toshibumi Tanaka
Social Democratic

A gubernatorial election was held on 23 April 1955 to elect the Governor of Hokkaido Prefecture.

== Candidates ==
- Toshibumi Tanaka - incumbent governor of Hokkaido Prefecture, age 43.
- Sanji Nishikawa (西川三次, Nishikawa Sanji), age 52.

== Results ==
19 Hokkaido gubernatorial election
Party	Candidate	Votes	%	±%
Independent	Toshibumi Tanaka *	1,151,194		
Independent	Sanji Nishikawa	648,213		
Turnout		1,859,308	77.86	
