= Naomichi Suzuki =

Governor of Hokkaidō

- 鈴木 直道
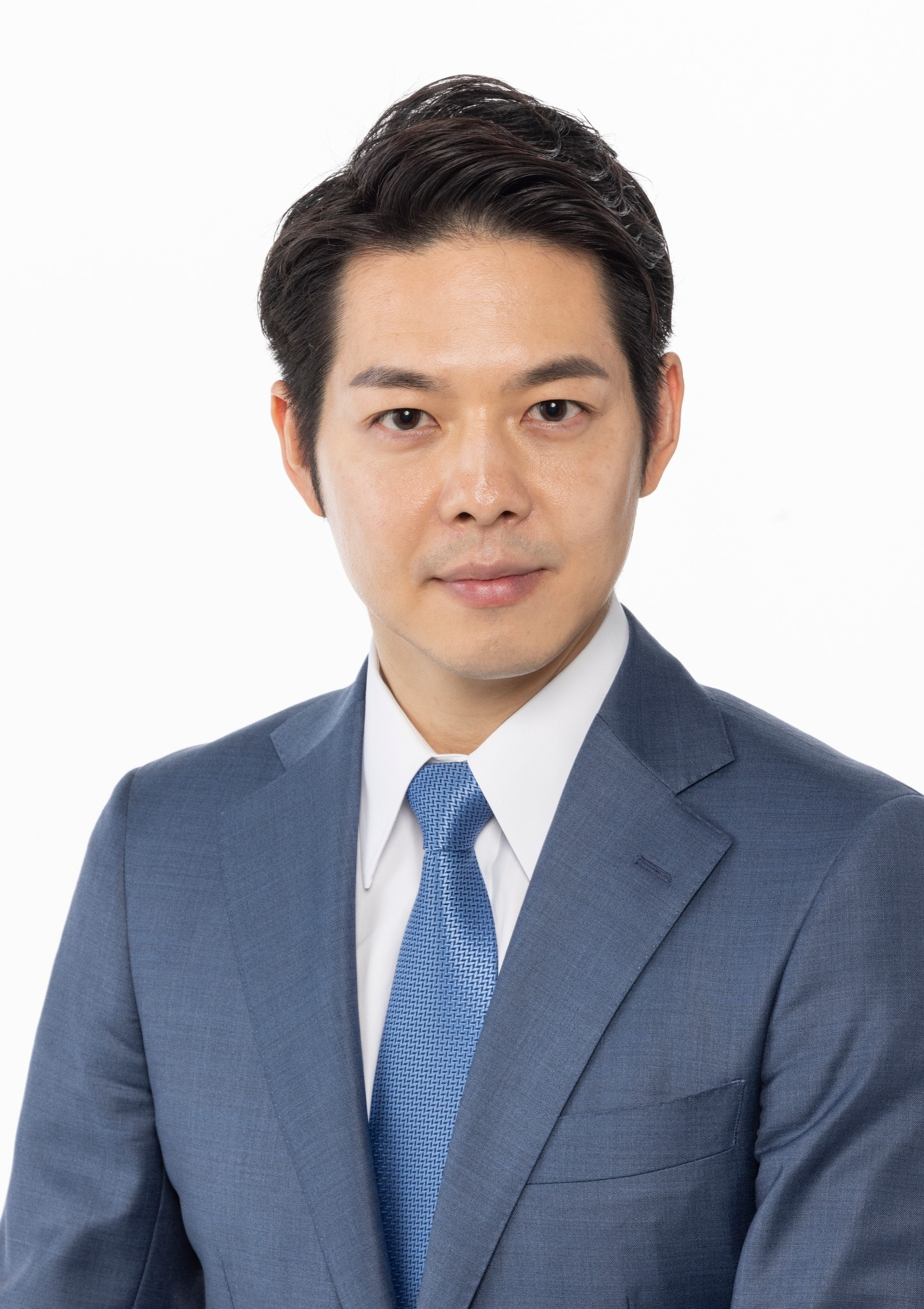
- Official portrait, 2023

7th Governor of Hokkaido
- Incumbent
- Assumed office 23 April 2019
- Monarchs: Akihito; Naruhito
- Preceded by: Harumi Takahashi

Mayor of Yūbari
- In office 24 April 2011 – 28 February 2019
- Preceded by: Hajime Fujikura
- Succeeded by: Tsuyoshi Atsutani

Personal details
- Born: 14 March 1981 (age 45) Kasukabe, Saitama, Japan
- Party: Independent
- Education: Hosei University
- Website: Official website

Naomichi Suzuki (鈴木 直道, Suzuki Naomichi; born 14 March 1981) is a Japanese politician who currently serves as the governor of Hokkaidō. He previously served as mayor of Yūbari city for two consecutive terms from 2011 to 2019. He had also served in Regional Sovereignty Strategy Office of Cabinet Office and as a chief of General Affairs Division in General Affairs Department at Tokyo Governor's Office.

== Early life and career ==
Suzuki was born in Kasukabe city of Saitama Prefecture and was raised in Misato City in the same Prefecture. He attended Misato High School in Misato City. He lived with his mother due to divorce of his parents. He was not able to attend college due to economic problems. At 18 years of age he passed the Tokyo Metropolitan Staff Employment Examination and entered the Tokyo Metropolitan Government in April 1999 as an employee. In April 2000, he took admission at Hosei University and graduated from the faculty of law in 2004. In University, he served as captain of the boxing club and was the runner-up in 2002 at National Sports Tournament in Boxing Competition.

During this time as an employee of Tokyo, he joined the Tokyo Metropolitan Government's Public Health Bureau (currently the Tokyo Metropolitan Health and Welfare Bureau), Tokyo Metropolitan Institute of Public Health (currently the Tokyo Metropolitan Health and Safety Research Center), the Tokyo Metropolitan Kita Medical Center, and the Health and Welfare Bureau and policy Department. After his tenure in Control Division of Welfare Department of health and Affairs Department as chief of General Administration Division, in January 2008 he was sent to Yubari from Tokyo as city official. In 2010, he was transferred to the Regional Sovereignty Strategy Office of the Cabinet Office as the head of the General Affairs Division of the General Affairs Department of the Tokyo Governor's Headquarters (currently Tokyo Metropolitan Government Policy Planning Bureau). In the same year, he participated in Yubari government.

In November 2010 he showed his intention to run in the Yubari mayoral election and retired from Tokyo Metropolitan Government. He ran independently for mayor election. In April 2011 at the age of 30 years and 1 month Suzuki became the youngest ever mayor to be elected from any city of the country. He was supported by LDP and Komeito.

In March 2013, Naomichi Suzuki was selected as "Young Global Leaders" by the World Economic Forum hosting the Davos Conference.

In 2014, he participated in the Ministry of Finance as Financial System Council as an expert.

In April 2015, he was re-elected as Mayor of Yubari. In November, he received the "Best Dresser Award" from the Japan Men's Fashion Association.

On 29 January 2019, he announced his intention to run without affiliation in the Hokkaido governor's election following the expiration of his term as Mayor. In an interview he told reporters that the LDP and Komeito will support him.

On 7 April 2019, he was elected for the first time by defeating the opposition party unification candidate in the Hokkaido Governor's Election. He was the youngest prefectural governor at the time.

Suzuki's policies include the creation of the "Hokkaido Cheering Committee".

Suzuki ran for reelection for governor in 2023, defeating other three candidates in a landslide with over 75% of the vote.
