= 2023 Hokkaido gubernatorial election =

- 9 April 2023
- Turnout: 51.7%
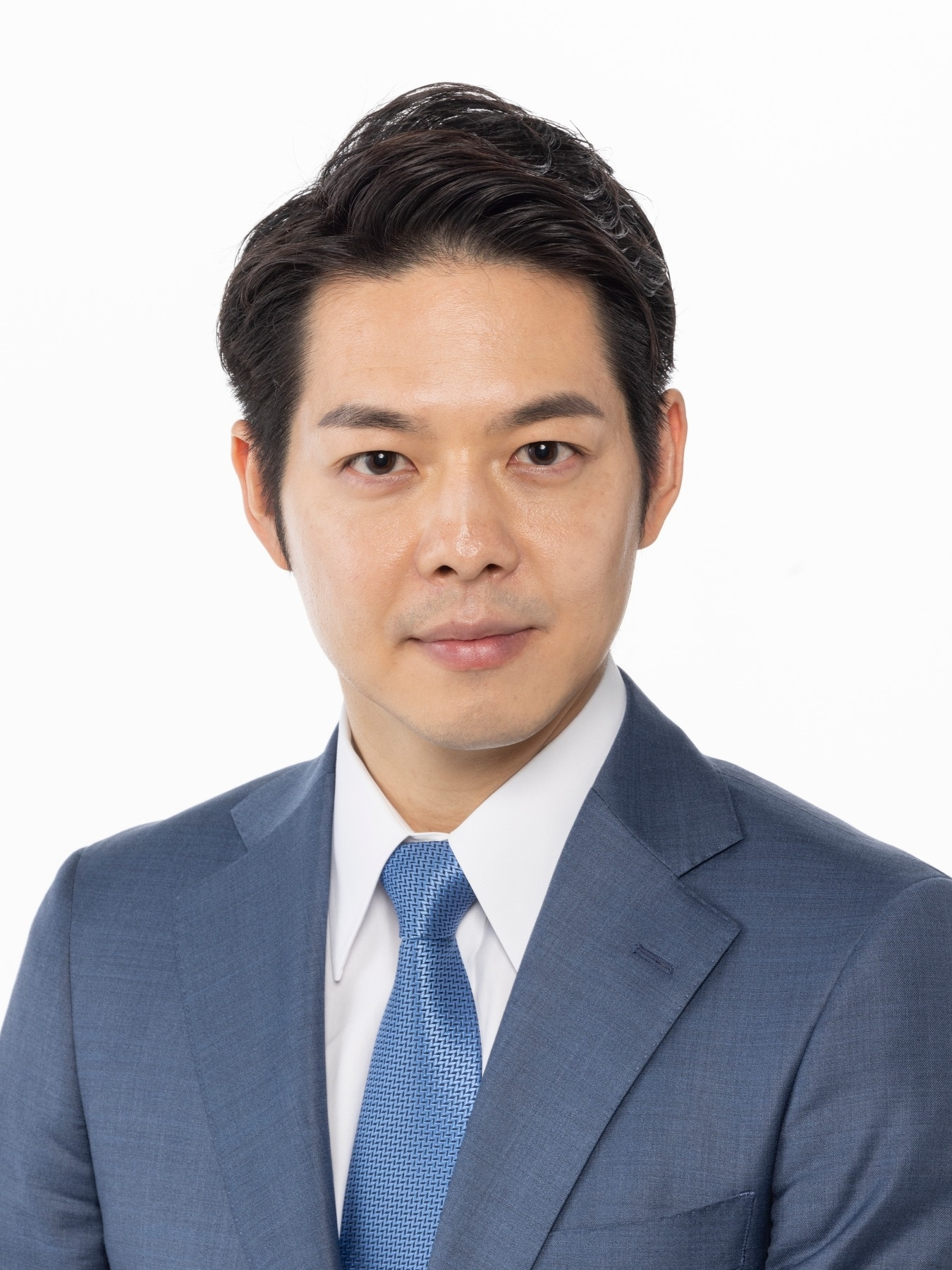

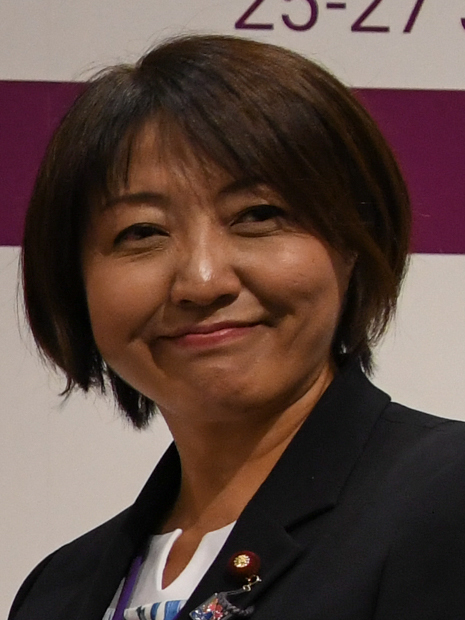
Candidate	Naomichi Suzuki	Maki Ikeda
Party	Independent	Independent
Popular vote	1,692,436	479,678
Percentage	75.6%	21.4%
Supported by	LDP, Komeito	CDP, JCP, SDP, DPFP
Governor before election
Naomichi Suzuki
Independent
Elected Governor
Naomichi Suzuki
Independent

The 2023 Hokkaido gubernatorial election was held on 9 April 2023, to elect the next governor of Hokkaido Prefecture. It was held as part of the 2023 Japanese unified local elections. The incumbent governor of Hokkaido, independent candidate, Naomichi Suzuki, won his second landslide victory. This time against Constitutional Democratic Party of Japan candidate Maki Ikeda.

Maki Ikeda, a newcomer candidate, attempted to position herself as a competent competitor to Suzuki.

== Candidates ==
- Naomichi Suzuki, Incumbent Governor and former mayor of Yūbari backed by LDP and Komeito.
- Maki Ikeda, Former member of the House of Representatives from Hokkaido's proportional representation block backed by the Constitutional Democratic Party of Japan, Japanese Communist Party, Social Democratic Party, and the Democratic Party for the People.
- Yoshio Monbetsu, Construction worker.
- Daisuke Mihara, Former post office employee and barber. Ran as a single-issue candidate against the demolition of Hokkaido Centennial Memorial Tower.

=== Withdrawn candidates ===
- Mikuma, business investor who announced his candidacy at a press conference on March 10, 2023. 5 days later, on March 15, they withdrew their candidacy. The name "Mikuma" is a pseudonym and the candidate refused to state their actual name.
- Takashi Wada, furniture manufacturer, on March 8, 2023, he expressed his intention to run as a candidate during an interview. Despite his declared candidacy, he failed to register as a candidate by the registration date. He would later run for the Hokkaido Prefectural Assembly for Ebetsu during the 2023 Hokkaido prefectural assembly election, which he lost.

== Campaigning ==
The election saw heavy campaigning by both major candidates.

Suzuki primarily campaigned near the Pacific coast, making most of his speeches in Ishikari Subprefecture, Hidaka Subprefecture, and Tokachi Subprefecture. Suzuki leaned heavily upon the interests of agricultural and fishing cooperatives.

Ikeda would campaign most heavily along the northern coast, near the Sea of Japan, though her campaign initially centered in Hiyama Subprefecture, she would later move further south, shifting her focus to Hakodate. Ikeda would primarily campaign under plans of expanding welfare in the prefecture.

== Results ==
Pie Chart
1. Naomichi Suzuki (75.6%)
2. Maki Ikeda (21.4%)
3. Yoshio Monbetsu (1.81%)
4. Daisuke Mihara (1.12%)

Hokkaido gubernatorial 2023
Party	Candidate	Votes	%	±%
Independent	Naomichi Suzuki	1,692,436	75.6%	+12.9%
Independent	Maki Ikeda	479,678	21.4%	New
Independent	Yoshio Monbetsu	40,579	1.8%	New
Independent	Daisuke Mihara	24,978	1.1%	New
Turnout		2,237,671	51.7%	−6.7%
