= 1967 Hokkaido gubernatorial election =

Election for Governor of Hokkaido

- 15 April 1967
- Turnout: 78.15%
Nominee	Kingo Machimura	Shōhei Tsukada	Independent (politician)
Party	LDP	Social Democratic	Gōji Satō
Popular vote	1,424,532	893,555	17,440
Governor before election
Kingo Machimura
LDP
Elected Governor
Kingo Machimura
LDP

A gubernatorial election was held on 15 April 1967 to elect the Governor of Hokkaido Prefecture.

== Candidates ==
- Kingo Machimura - incumbent governor of Hokkaido Prefecture, age 66
- Shōhei Tsukada - Vice-chairman of the Hokkaido Prefectural Assembly, age 48
- Gōji Satō (佐藤剛二, Satō Gōji), age 61

== Results ==
1967 Hokkaido gubernatorial election
Party	Candidate	Votes	%	±%
LDP	Kingo Machimura *	1,424,532		
Social Democratic	Shōhei Tsukada	893,555		
Independent	Gōji Satō	17,440		
Turnout		2,385,105	78.15	
