= 1975 Hokkaido gubernatorial election =

Election for Governor of Hokkaido

- 13 April 1975
- Turnout: 84.28%
Nominee	Naohiro Dōgakinai	Kozo Igarashi
Party	Independent	Independent
Popular vote	1,628,838	1,324,197
Governor before election
Naohiro Dōgakinai
LDP
Elected Governor
Naohiro Dōgakinai
Independent

A gubernatorial election was held on 13 April 1975 to elect the Governor of Hokkaido Prefecture.

== Candidates ==
- Naohiro Dōgakinai - incumbent governor of Hokkaido Prefecture, age 60.
- Kozo Igarashi - former mayor of Asahikawa, Hokkaidō, age 49.

== Results ==
1975 Hokkaido gubernatorial election
Party	Candidate	Votes	%	±%
Independent	Naohiro Dōgakinai *	1,628,838		
Independent	Kozo Igarashi	1,324,197		
Turnout		2,983,444	84.28	
