= 2019 Hokkaido gubernatorial election =

Election for Governor of Hokkaido

- 7 April 2019
- Turnout: 58.34
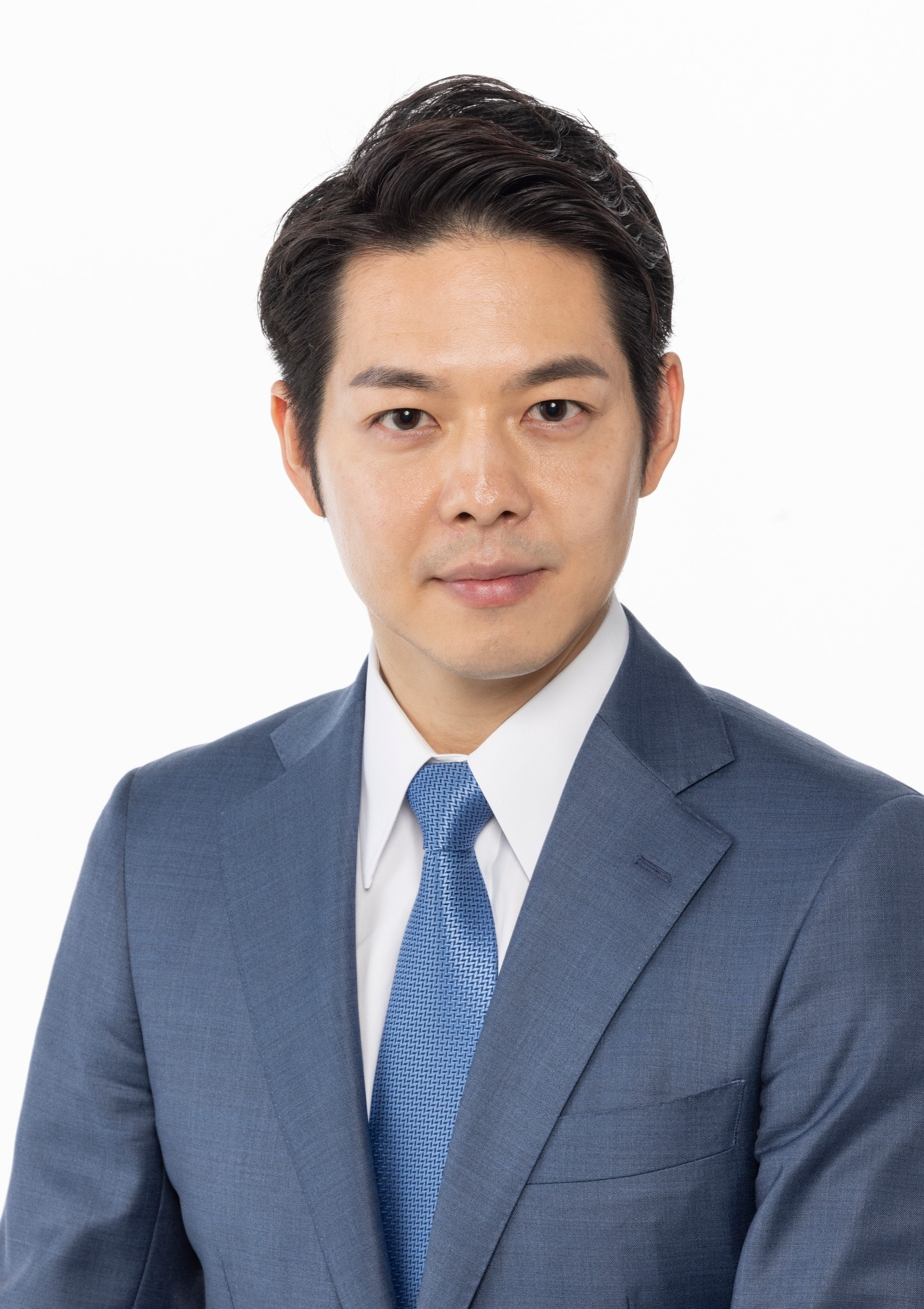

Candidate	Naomichi Suzuki	Tomohiro Ishikawa
Party	Independent	Independent
Popular vote	1,621,171	963,942
Percentage	62.71%	37.29%
Supported by	LDP, Komeito	CDP, JCP, SDP, DPFP
Governor before election
Harumi Takahashi
Independent
Elected Governor
Naomichi Suzuki
Independent

The 2019 Hokkaido gubernatorial election was held on 7 April 2019 to elect the next governor of Hokkaido Prefecture. After serving four terms, incumbent Governor Harumi Takahashi decided not to seek re-election. The election resulted in a landslide victory for Naomichi Suzuki, the former mayor of Yūbari, who won 62% of the popular vote. His opponent, Tomohiro Ishikawa, had the support of CDP, JCP, SDP and DPFP, but only managed to secure 37% of the vote.

== Candidates ==
- Tomohiro Ishikawa, backed by the opposition parties CDP, JCP, SDP, DPFP - former member of the House of Representatives.
- Naomichi Suzuki backed by LDP and Komeito - former mayor of Yūbari, Hokkaido

=== Declined ===
- Seiji Osaka - member of the House of Representatives
- Noriyuki Satō (broadcaster) - broadcaster
- Iehiro Tokugawa - 19th head of the Tokugawa clan
- Akihiro Izumi - director of the Ministry of Land, Infrastructure, Transport and Tourism Hokkaido Bureau.
- Seiko Hashimoto - member of the House of Councillors

== Results ==
Hokkaido gubernatorial 2019
Party	Candidate	Votes	%	±%
Independent	Naomichi Suzuki	1,621,171	62.71	
Independent	Tomohiro Ishikawa	963,942	37.29	
Turnout		2.613.522	58.34	−1.28
Registered electors		4.479.708		
