= Naohiro Dōgakinai =

Japanese politician

- 堂垣内 尚弘
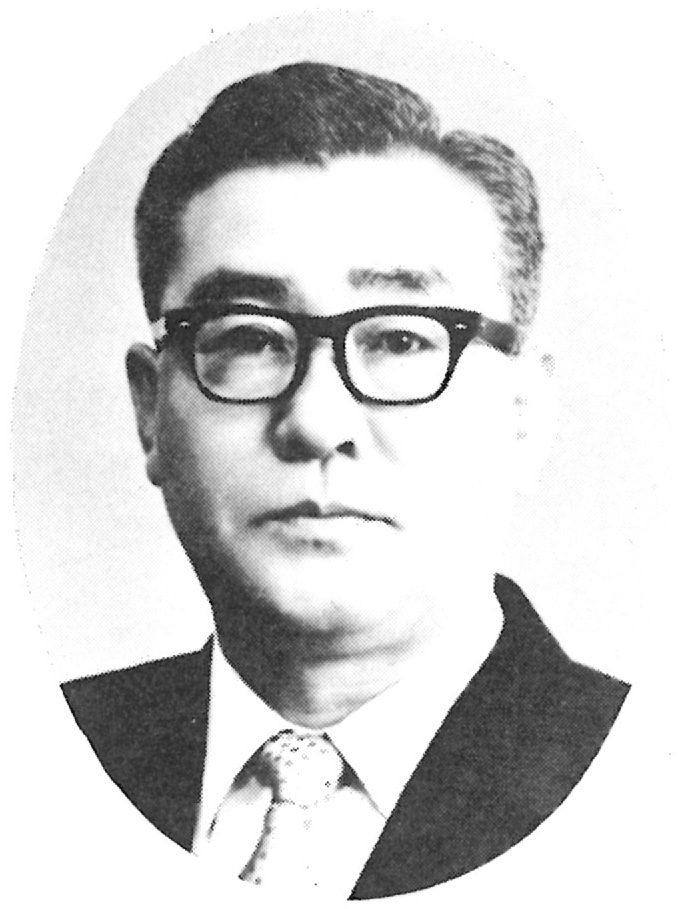

Governor of Hokkaido Prefecture
- In office 10 April 1971 – 10 April 1983
- Monarch: Hirohito
- Preceded by: Kingo Machimura
- Succeeded by: Takahiro Yokomichi

Personal details
- Born: 2 June 1914 Sapporo, Hokkaido, Japan
- Died: 2 February 2004 (aged 89)
- Party: Liberal Democratic
- Education: Sapporo First Junior High School
- Alma mater: Hokkaido Imperial University

Naohiro Dōgakinai (Japanese: 堂垣内尚弘; 2 June 1914 – 2 February 2004) was the third governor of Hokkaido (1971–1983). He was a member of the Liberal Democratic Party, and originally from Sapporo.

== Awards ==
- Order of the Sacred Treasure, 1st class, 1988

Preceded by Kingo Machimura	Governor of Hokkaido; 1971–1983	Succeeded by Takahiro Yokomichi

== Literature ==
『北海道道路史』（共著、北海道道路史調査会、1990年）

== Bibliography ==
- 北海道新聞社 - 北の隣人・日ソ国交回復30周年(1986年)
- 日外アソシエーツ編『20世紀日本人名辞典』（紀伊国屋書店）
