= Toshibumi Tanaka =

Japanese politician

- 田中 敏文
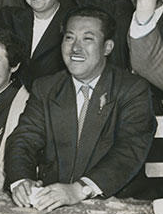

Governor of Hokkaido Prefecture
- In office 3 May 1947 – 23 April 1959
- Monarch: Hirohito
- Preceded by: Himself (as Director-General of the Hokkaidō Agency)
- Succeeded by: Kingo Machimura

32nd Director-General of the Hokkaidō Agency
- In office 21 April 1947 – 3 May 1947
- Monarch: Hirohito
- Preceded by: Kaneyoshi Okada
- Succeeded by: Himself (as Governor of Hokkaido Prefecture)

Personal details
- Born: 9 November 1911 Aomori Prefecture, Japan
- Died: 20 December 1982 (aged 71) Minato, Tokyo, Japan
- Education: Kyushu Imperial University

Toshibumi Tanaka (Japanese: 田中敏文) (9 November 1911 – 20 December 1982) was the first Governor of Hokkaido (1947–1959). He was a graduate of Kyushu University.

Preceded by New office	Governor of Hokkaido; 1947–1959	Succeeded by Kingo Machimura
