= Kingo Machimura =

Japanese politician

- 町村 金五
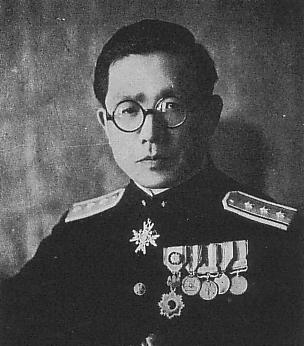

Minister of Home Affairs
- In office 25 November 1973 – 11 November 1974
- Prime Minister: Kakuei Tanaka
- Preceded by: Masumi Esaki
- Succeeded by: Hajime Fukuda

Director-General of the Hokkaido Development Agency
- In office 25 November 1973 – 11 November 1974
- Prime Minister: Kakuei Tanaka
- Preceded by: Masumi Esaki
- Succeeded by: Hajime Fukuda

Member of the House of Councillors
- In office 4 July 1971 – 9 July 1983
- Preceded by: Multi-member district
- Succeeded by: Constituency abolished
- Constituency: National district

Member of the House of Representatives
- In office 2 October 1952 – 25 March 1959
- Preceded by: Multi-member district
- Succeeded by: Tomiyo Takada
- Constituency: Hokkaido 1st
Gubernatorial offices
Governor of Hokkaido Prefecture
In office 23 April 1959 – 22 April 1971
Monarch	Hirohito
Preceded by	Toshibumi Tanaka
Succeeded by	Naohiro Dōgakinai
Governor of Niigata Prefecture
In office 1 February 1945 – 9 April 1945
Monarch	Hirohito
Preceded by	Tamon Maeda
Succeeded by	Masafuku Hatada
Governor of Toyama Prefecture
In office 7 January 1941 – 23 April 1943
Monarch	Hirohito
Preceded by	Kenzo Yano
Succeeded by	Nobuyoshi Saka

Personal details
- Born: 16 August 1900 Sapporo, Hokkaido, Japan
- Died: 14 December 1992 (aged 92) Tokyo, Japan
- Party: Liberal Democratic
- Other political affiliations: Kaishintō (1952–1954); Liberal (1954–1955)
- Spouse: Machiya Biba
- Children: Nobutaka Machimura (son)
- Parent: Kinya Machimura (father)
- Education: Tokyo Imperial University

Kingo Machimura (町村 金五, Machimura Kingo; 16 August 1900 – 14 December 1992) was a Japanese politician who served as governor of Toyama Prefecture (1941–1943), Governor of Niigata Prefecture (1945) and the second Governor of Hokkaido (1959–1971). He was a member of the Liberal Democratic Party. He was a graduate of the University of Tokyo. He was a recipient of the Order of the Rising Sun. His second son was Nobutaka Machimura, who was twice Minister of Foreign Affairs of Japan and Chief Cabinet Secretary of Japan.

== Bibliography ==
- 『町村金五伝』 北海タイムス社 1982年

House of Councillors
Preceded by Naotsugu Nabeshima	Chair of the Budget Committee of the House of Councillors of Japan; 1978–1979	Succeeded by Ichirō Yamanouchi
Preceded by Takeo Mitamura	Chair of the Legal Affairs Committee of the House of Councillors of Japan; 1957–1958	Succeeded by Tetsuzō Kojima
Political offices
Preceded by Masumi Esaki	Minister of Home Affairs; 1973–1974	Succeeded by Hajime Fukuda
Preceded by Masumi Esaki	Chairperson of the National Public Safety Commission; 1973–1974	Succeeded by Hajime Fukuda
Preceded by Masumi Esaki	Director General of the Hokkaido Development Agency; 1973–1974	Succeeded by Hajime Fukuda
Preceded by Toshibumi Tanaka	Governor of Hokkaido; 1959–1971	Succeeded by Naohiro Dōgakinai
Preceded by Tamon Maeda	Governor of Niigata Prefecture; 1945	Succeeded by Masafuku Hatada
Preceded by Kenzo Yano	Governor of Toyama Prefecture; 1941–1943	Succeeded by Nobuyoshi Saka
Party political offices
Preceded by Masatoshi Tokunaga	Chair, Liberal Democratic Party House of Councillors' Committee; 1980–1982	Succeeded by Matsuo Kimura
Honorary titles
Preceded by Fusae Ichikawa	Oldest member of the House of Councillors of Japan; 1981–1983	Succeeded by Torasaburō Shintani
