= List of governors of Hokkaido Prefecture =

Head of government of Hokkaido prefecture, Japan

Governor of Hokkaido
- Seal of Hokkaido

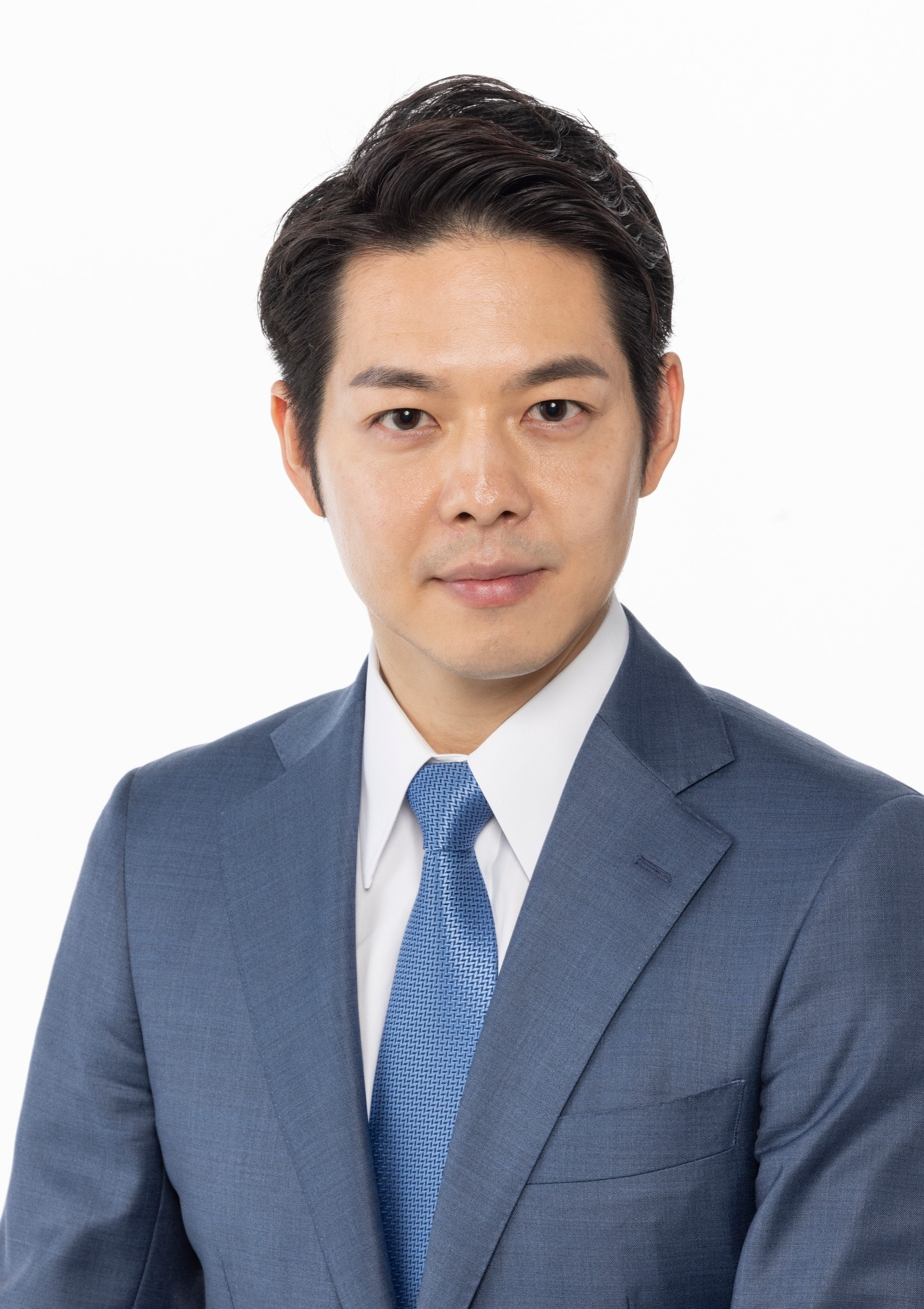
- Incumbent; Naomichi Suzuki since 23 April 2019
- Term length: Four years
- Inaugural holder: Toshibumi Tanaka
- Formation: 1947

The Governor of Hokkaido (北海道知事, Hokkaidō chiji) is the head of the local government of Hokkaido, Japan's largest prefecture. The seat of the local government is located in Sapporo, the capital city of the prefecture. The current governor is Naomichi Suzuki.

== List of governors ==
This is the list of the governors of Hokkaido.

No.	Name	Took office	Left office	Party	Number of terms
1	Toshibumi Tanaka (田中敏文)	May 1947	April 1959	First term independent, Social Democratic Party	3
2	Kingo Machimura (町村金五)	April 1959	April 1971	Liberal Democratic Party	3
3	Naohiro Dōgakinai (堂垣内尚弘)	April 1971	April 1983	Liberal Democratic Party	3
4	Takahiro Yokomichi (横路孝弘)	April 1983	April 1995	Social Democratic Party	3
5	Tatsuya Hori (堀達也)	April 1995	April 2003	Independent	2
6	Harumi Takahashi (高橋はるみ)	April 2003	April 2019	Independent	4
7	Naomichi Suzuki (鈴木直道)	April 2019	-	Independent	-
