= Keio Senior High School =

Private high school in Yokohama, Kanagawa, Japan

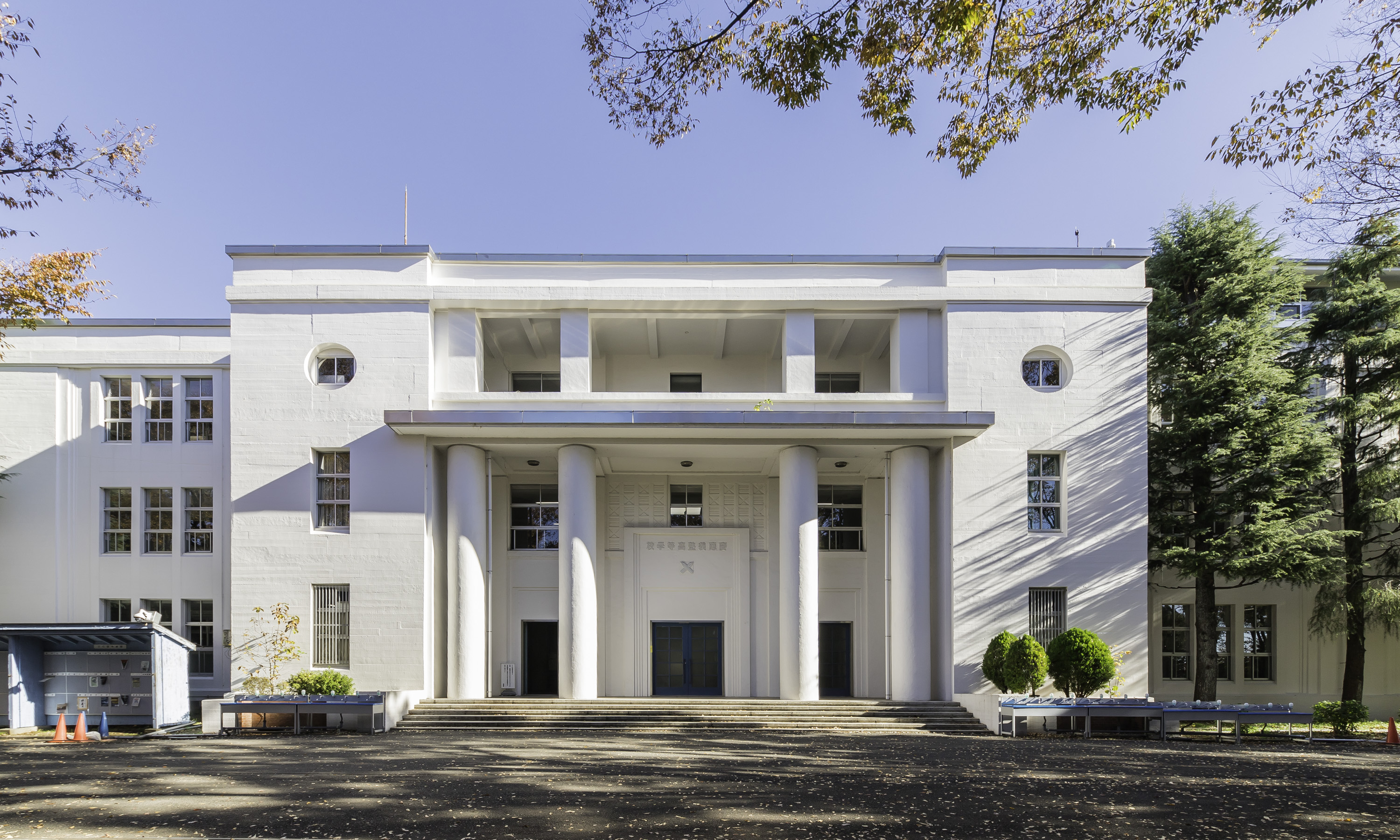
- Yokohama; Japan

Information
- Type: Private school
- Motto: Independence and Self-Respect
- Established: 1948
- Principal: Takeshi Akusawa
- Teaching staff: 200
- Grades: 10–12
- Enrolment: 2,200
- Campus: Large city
- Campus size: 56,097m^{2}
- Colors: Blue, Red and Blue
- Sports Nickname: UNICORNS
- Website: www.hs.keio.ac.jp

Keio Senior High School (慶應義塾高等学校, Keiō Gijuku Kōtōgakkō) is a private boys' high school in Kōhoku-ku, Yokohama, Japan. It is one of the integrated schools of Keio University.

== Overview ==
The Keio High Schools No. 1 and No. 2 merged into Keio SHS in 1948. As of 2019 its student body was 2,200.

== History ==
- In 1948, based on the School Education Act promulgated the previous year, Keio Senior High Schools No. 1 and No. 2 were established as new senior high schools and classes began. In 1949, the names Keio Senior High Schools No. 1 and No. 2 were abolished, and they became "Keio Senior High School." After Keio facilities in Hiyoshi were returned from the American military, the high school relocated to Hiyoshi and classes commenced.
- In November 1949, the first Hiyoshi Festival was held jointly by the Student Association, Cultural Association, and Athletic Association. In March 1951, the Student Association concluded all its duties, and a new Student Council was established. In April, the Student Council held its first Academy Council meeting.
- In May 1952, the first Athletic Meet was held at the Hiyoshi Athletics Field.
- In 1958, the Keio University Hiyoshi Commemorative Hall was completed, hosting the centennial commemoration ceremony of the founding of Keio University.
- In 1963, the Hiyoshi Gymnasium (Hiyoshi Kaido) was completed. Its name was decided through a public solicitation from faculty and students.
- In October 1968, the 20th-anniversary commemoration ceremony of Keio Senior High School's founding was held.
- In May 1970, the Special Education Building (now Building A) was completed. In November 1973, a planetarium was installed. In November 1990, a computer classroom was newly established.
- In March 1984, the New Building (now Building B) and the underground gymnasium were completed.
- In January 2003, admissions based on individual achievements (approximately 40 positions) were implemented for the first time.
- In April 2003, it was designated as a Super Science High School by the Ministry of Education, Culture, Sports, Science, and Technology.
- In November 2009, the Mamushidani Gymnasium was completed.
- In August 2018, the Hiyoshi Education Building was completed. The building was named the Koryu Building and Sozo Building, chosen through a solicitation from students.

== Student life ==
=== Student facilities ===
- Located in Keio University's Hiyoshi Campus, Keio Senior High School is integrated with other university facilities, and there is no separate gate for the high school.
- Across its extensive campus, the high school has amenities such as a gymnasium, a sports ground, and a judo hall.
- Beneath the sports ground, an air raid shelter from wartime remains, which once housed the Combined Fleet Headquarters and Maritime Escort Headquarters. Approximately once a month, tours of the air raid shelter are conducted and are open to the public.
- The school cafeteria is also available.
- The high school library alone holds a collection of 100,000 books.
- Facilities such as a telescope, planetarium, and Foucault pendulum are also present.

=== School events ===
- Sōkeisen
- Hiyoshi Festival (school festival) in October
- School trip

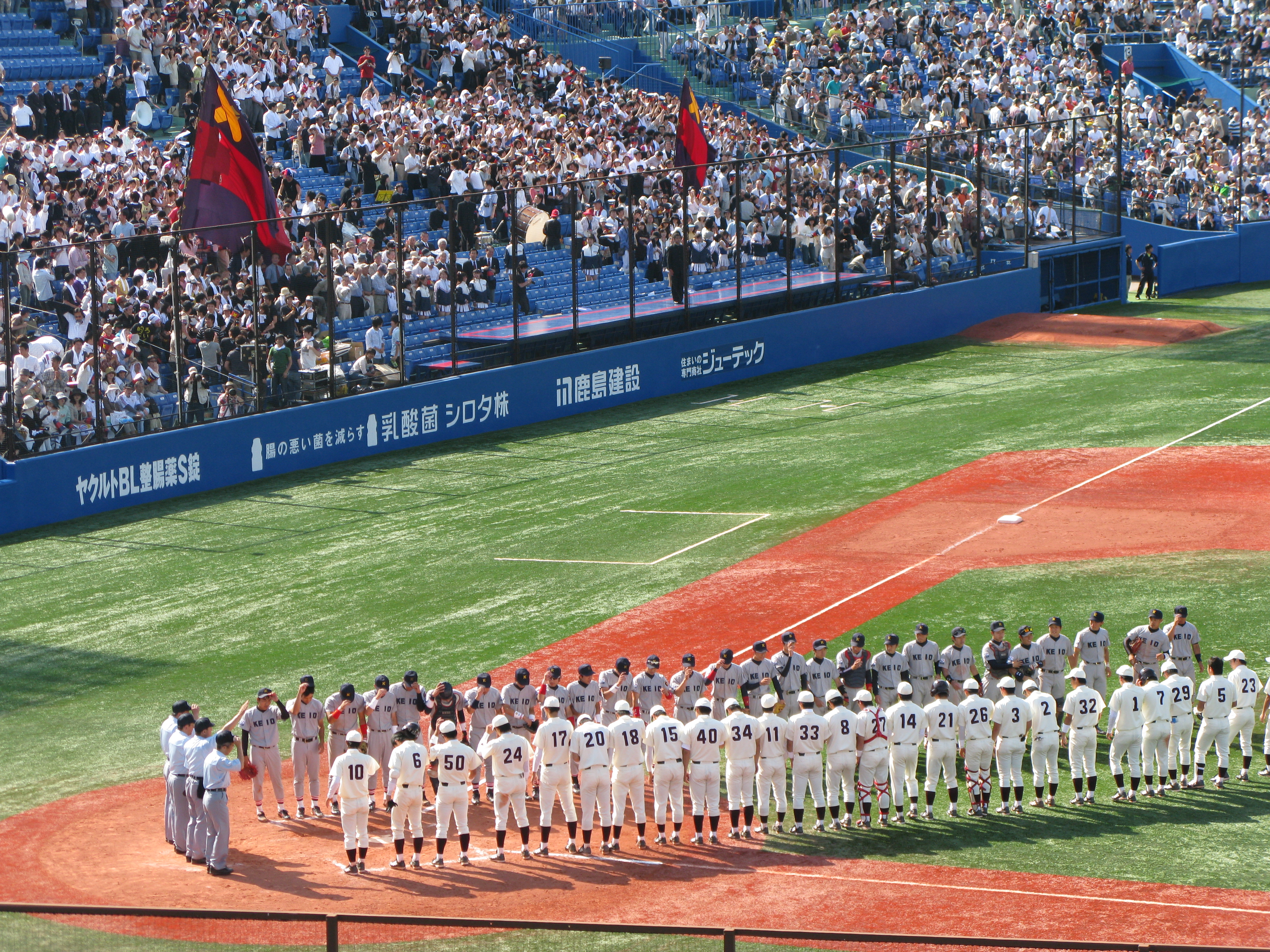
Sokeisen Spring 2008 - Waseda and Keio Universities' players

=== Clubs ===
At Keio Senior High School, 80 clubs are active in various fields such as academics, culture, and sports. Cultural clubs belong to the Cultural Organization Federation, while sports clubs belong to the Athletic Organization Federation.

==== Sports clubs ====
- In 2023, the baseball team won the national summer high school baseball championship after 107 years, defeating last year's champs Sendai Ikuei Gakuen High School 8–2 in the final.

== Cheerleading ==
As Keio Senior High School is one of the integrated schools established by Keio University (Keio University calls its group schools as “integrated schools” rather than an “affiliated schools” because it values a spirit of Independence and Self-Respect), most students go on to Keio University after graduation. Keio University has inherited the “Source of Honorable Character and Model of Wisdom and Virtue” (character building through study) and “Independence and Self-Respect” (independence of mind and body and respect for self and others) to produce leaders for the entire society (Keio University's purpose). A highly refined form of cheering has been established in the school through its history.

"Young Blood", "Titan," "Sirius," "Raging fire," and "Dash Keio" are some of the songs sung during the cheerleading.

The following is a list of the songs used in the cheerleading of the Japanese High School Baseball Championship event in the summer of 2023, when the team won the championship for the first time in 107 years. Basically, the songs are performed in this order.

The usual songs such as “We are the Champion” and “Blue Sky Keio” are omitted from this tournament's cheerleading.

=== The inning song ===
List of songs played at the beginning of each round.

1st inning - “Young Blood"

2nd inning - “Fanfare Sui” (commemorative song of the 105th convention)

3rd inning - “Under the Tricolor School Flag" (Tricolor Flag, which color is blue, red and blue is the school flag of Keio University and its integrated schools.)

4th inning - “A picture drew in the heart" (This song is performed by the baton team (Unicorns) of Keio Girls Senior High School and is called the cheerleading song. The Keio University cheerleading team (Majorettes) performs two different songs in the Saturday games and the Sunday game (and later on if a game is carried over to Monday or later due to a tie or rain postponement since the Tokyo Big 6 University Baseball League of which Keio University belongs uses a point system) each in the spring and autumn league games, but the baton team of Keio Girls Senior High School only performs “A picture drew in the heart” as their repertoire.)

5th inning - “Young Blood”

6th inning - “Mr. Moribayashi is Not Enough” (To further increase the enthusiasm of the cheering crowd after intermission, the students of the baseball team arranges the trending “Not Enough Excitement” call to suit coach Takahiko Moribayashi. Immediately after, they enter “Sirius”)

7th inning - “Young Blood”

8th inning - “Fanfare Sui”

9th inning - “Young Blood"

↓

=== Fanfare ===
"Titan"

It is played continuously after the inning song.

↓(Here we go, Keio)

=== March Songs ===
1. “Sirius,” “Antares,” “Kong-ming"

2. “Animal,” “Soleil,” “Gale,” “Patriot” (Each of the songs in 2 may be repeated by itself without 1, in which case the call is made between songs. Note that the call for “Gale” is “Keio we wanna get a chance!” at Keio Senior High School as is the same as the call for “Phoenix” used at Keio university, which is different from the call of ”KEIO Keio! KEIO Keio!" used in the Keio university's “Gale”).

In march songs, 1 and 2 are repeated alternately and connected to the connection.

"Raging fire"

It is an original song of Keio Senior High School and is played during the most exciting scenes in the game. It corresponds to Keio University's “Vermilion Bird”.

=== Connection ===
"Arabian Connection” and "Spanish Connection"

When the person in charge of monitoring the game situation decides that the game has entered a scoring opportunity, this “connection” songs are used to connect from the march songs to “Theme of Assault,” “Call Keio,” and “Dash Keio.”

↓

=== “Theme of Assault” ===
Sometimes repeated by itself.

↓

=== “Call Keio" ===
↓

=== "Dash Keio" ===
Unless a point is scored or the inning changes, "Dash Keio" is repeated without returning to the march songs (this is called "endless dash"). If this "Dash Keio" continues for a while, it is repeated again with "Call Keio" to boost the enthusiasm in the cheering section.

=== "Young blood" (when scoring) ===
It is an honorable tradition at Keio University to sing "Young Blood" in unison as all of the members of Keio Senior High School, Keio University, its integrated schools and its alumni shares the joy of scoring a goal, shoulder to shoulder. The tempo of the song is often faster than that of the inning song, "Young Blood."

=== "The School Song of Keio University" ===
The School Song of Keio University is played by Keio University, Keio Senior High School, and Keio Girls Senior High School Wagner Society Orchestra when the team wins the game.

The cheerleading of these games are led by the "Three teams in charge of Cheerleading" (the Cheerleading Team, the Brass Band Team, and the Baton Team(Unicorns) of Keio Girls Senior High School). At Keio University, Cheerleading Team (consisting of the Cheerleading Team(Majorettes), Brass Band Team and various tools) plays the role of the "Three teams in charge of Cheerleading" on its own.

== Notable alumni ==
=== Politicians ===
- Shigeru Ishiba, Prime Minister of Japan
- Nobuteru Ishihara
- Hirotaka Ishihara
- Shintaro Ito
- Tatsuya Ito
- Taku Otsuka
- Motohiro Ono
- Shinsuke Okuno
- Zentaro Kamei
- Taro Kono
- Keizo Takemi
- Wataru Takeshita
- Kenji Kosaka
- Hirofumi Nakasone
- Tokihiro Nakamura
- Makoto Nishida
- Nobuo Kishi
- Shigefumi Matsuzawa
- Yorihisa Matsuno
- Akihisa Nagashima
- Yoshio Sakurauchi
- Masaaki Itokawa
- Yoichiro Esaki
- Otohiko Endo
- Seiichi Ota
- Koji Sato

=== Businessmen ===
- Hiroaki Aoki
- Yotaro Kobayashi
- Kakutaro Kitashiro
- Takeo Shiina
- Osamu Nagayama
- Harunori Takahashi
- Akio Toyoda
- James Kondo

=== Academics ===
- Seiichiro Katsura
- Masaru Tomita
- Naoyuki Agawa
- Ken Sakamura
- Hitoshi Nagai
- Takayuki Ohira
- Kohei Itoh, physicist and 20th president of Keio University

=== Writers ===
- George Abe
- Hiroshi Onogi
- Heinosuke Gosho, film director and screenwriter

=== Actors ===
- Koji Ishizaka
- Yujiro Ishihara
- Yoshizumi Ishihara
- Takanori Iwata
- Ichikawa Ennosuke III
- Yuzo Kayama
- Hiroshi Kawaguchi
- Yusuke Kawazu
- Takeshi Kusaka
- Hiroshi Koizumi
- Keisuke Koide
- Katsuhiko Nakagawa

=== Actress ===
- Mana Ashida

=== Musicians ===
- Yuji Ohno
- Takahiro Konagawa
- Asei Kobayashi
- Sho Sakurai
- Akira Jimbo
- Akira Senju
- Izumi Tateno
- Isao Tomita
- Masataka Matsutoya
- Takashi Matsumoto
- Takashi Yoshimatsu

=== Artists ===
- Shoji Kawamori
- Hiroshi Senju
- Michio Hoshino, photographer
- Fujihiko Hosono, mangaka
- Haruhiko Mikimoto
- Yohji Yamamoto, fashion designer

=== Announcers ===
- Taro Kimura
- Sosuke Sumitani
- Mitsuhiro Nakamura

=== Sportsmen ===
- Tsunekazu Takeda, equestrian
- Kiyohide Kuwata, basketball player
- Shuzo Matsuoka, tennis player
- Ryo Miyake, fencer
- Shoma Sato, swimmer

==== Baseball players ====
- Tomoaki Sato
- Akihiro Hakumura
- Taisei Tsurusaki
- Tatsuru Yanagimachi

==== Rugby union players ====
- Hisataka Ikuta
- Taku Inokuchi

==== Footballers ====
- Ken Tokura
- Yoshinori Muto
- Hiroshi Ninomiya
- Hiroshi Katayama

=== Others ===
- Ichiro Fujisaki, bureaucrat
- Ikuo Hayashi, Aum Shinrikyo member

== See also ==
- Keio University
