= Masaru Tomita =

Japanese scientist and founder of the E-Cell simulation system

- Born: December 28, 1957 (age 68)
- Education: Keio University, Carnegie Mellon University, Kyoto University
- Known for: Systems biology, Metabolomics, Machine translation
- Awards: Presidential Young Investigators Award from National Science Foundation (1988); IBM Shared University Research Award (2003)
- Scientific career
- Fields: Systems biology; Computer science
- Workplaces: Keio University Shonan Fujisawa Campus; Institute for Advanced Biosciences, Keio University
- Doctoral advisor: Herbert Alexander Simon

Masaru Tomita (Japanese: 冨田 勝, Hepburn: Tomita Masaru; born December 28, 1957) is a Japanese life scientist and computer scientist known for pioneering contributions to systems biology, metabolomics, artificial intelligence, and computational biology. He is Distinguished Professor at Keio University and Representative Director of Tsuruoka Science Park. He previously served as Dean of the Faculty of Environment and Information Studies and Director of the Institute for Advanced Biosciences at Keio University. Tomita holds four doctoral degrees in four different fields.

== Biography ==
Tomita was born in Tokyo, Japan, in 1957 as the eldest son of Isao Tomita, the internationally acclaimed synthesizer artist. He attended Keio Senior High School before enrolling at Keio University, where he studied mathematics and developed an early interest in computer science and artificial intelligence. While still an undergraduate at Keio University, Tomita developed the Apple Kanji System, an early Japanese-language system for the Apple II that enabled kanji output on personal computers. The software was commercially released in 1980.

Tomita received a B.S. in Mathematics from Keio University in 1981. He then entered the School of Computer Science at Carnegie Mellon University, where he studied artificial intelligence under Nobel laureate Herbert A. Simon. He received an M.S. in 1983 and a Ph.D. in Computer Science in 1985 from Carnegie Mellon University.

He subsequently earned three additional doctoral degrees: a Doctor of Engineering from Kyoto University (1994), a Ph.D. in Medicine from Keio University in 1998, and a Ph.D. in Media and Governance from Keio University in 2019, the last in the field of social science.

== Career ==
After receiving his Ph.D. from Carnegie Mellon University in 1985, Tomita joined the School of Computer Science at Carnegie Mellon University as a Research Associate. Later that year, he was invited to lunch with Steve Jobs during Jobs's visit to Carnegie Mellon University to discuss the Apple Kanji System.

In 1987, he was promoted to Assistant Professor and served as Associate Director of the Center for Machine Translation at Carnegie Mellon University.

In 1990, Tomita joined Keio University as an Associate Professor in the Faculty of Environment and Information Studies. He was promoted to Professor in 1997, served as Director of the Institute for Advanced Biosciences from 2001, and was Dean of the Faculty of Environment and Information Studies from 2005 to 2007.

== Research ==
=== Natural Language Processing ===
Tomita's doctoral research at Carnegie Mellon University focused on natural language parsing, a fundamental technology in artificial intelligence. He developed the Generalized LR (GLR) parsing algorithm, which extends the LR parsing method for programming languages to efficiently handle ambiguous natural language grammars. The resulting GLR parser achieved substantially higher parsing speed than previous approaches and became widely known as the Tomita parser, Tomita LR parser, or Tomita algorithm.

The GLR algorithm was subsequently refined and improved by other researchers. More than four decades later, a 2026 benchmark study by researchers at the University of Sydney identified GLR as the best-performing generalized parser among those evaluated, underscoring the enduring effectiveness of Tomita's original design.

=== Whole-cell simulation (E-Cell) ===
In the mid-1990s, Tomita founded the E-Cell Project at Keio University to develop computational models of living cells. The project led to the development of E-CELL, a software environment for whole-cell simulation, which was described in Bioinformatics in 1999. The E-Cell Project was featured in Science in the news article "Building Working Cells 'in Silico'" (1999), which highlighted E-CELL as a software environment for whole-cell simulation.

It was also featured in Nature in the article "Going for Grand Challenges" (1999) as an example of computational whole-cell modeling.

In 2001, Tomita further articulated this vision in his Trends in Biotechnology article, "Whole Cell Simulation: A Grand Challenge of the 21st Century," proposing comprehensive computational simulation of entire living cells as a major goal for systems biology.

More than a decade later, J. Craig Venter described the E-Cell Project in Life at the Speed of Light (2013) as an early attempt to create an "electronic cell".

=== Metabolomics ===
Tomita made pioneering contributions to metabolomics. In 2002, Tomita and Tomoyoshi Soga co-developed one of the first capillary electrophoresis–mass spectrometry (CE–MS) platforms for comprehensive metabolome analysis. Their 2003 paper, "Metabolome Analysis by Capillary Electrophoresis Mass Spectrometry," published in the Journal of Proteome Research, was the first scientific paper to include the term metabolome in its title and became a foundational publication in metabolomics.

=== Keio Collection and Genome-scale multi-omics ===
Tomita led the project that generated the Keio Collection, a genome-wide library of Escherichia coli single-gene knockout mutants developed by Hirotada Mori and colleagues. The collection was described in 2006 and has become an international standard resource for functional genomics and systems biology.

Tomita's group subsequently used the Keio Collection as the basis for a genome-scale multi-omics analysis of Escherichia coli, combining metabolome, transcriptome, proteome, and fluxome data to investigate cellular responses to genetic and environmental perturbations. The study was published in Science in 2007.

Upon publication, the work was highlighted in Science Express and was subsequently featured in Science's STKE (now Science Signaling) in the article "Differential Responses to Change", which highlighted its integration of multiple high-throughput datasets to analyze cellular responses to genetic and environmental perturbations.

=== Entrepreneurship ===
Tomita co-founded Human Metabolome Technologies, Inc. (HMT), which was listed on the Tokyo Stock Exchange Mothers market in 2013 and transferred to the Standard Market in 2025.

He subsequently supported the founding of eight startup companies originating from Keio University's Institute for Advanced Biosciences, including Spiber, Metagen, and SalivaTech.

In 2021, he established the Tsuruoka Science Park, bringing these ventures together into a collaborative innovation ecosystem, and has since served as its Representative Director.

== Selected honors and awards ==
- NSF Presidential Young Investigator Award (1988)
- IBM Japan Science Prize (2002)
- BM Shared University Research Award (2003)
- Minister of Science and Technology Policy Award (2004)
- Commendation for Science and Technology by the Minister of Education (2007)
- Audi Innovation Award (2016)
- Lifetime Honorary Fellow, International Metabolomics Society (2017)
- 68th Kahoku Bunka Prize (2019)
- 5^{th} Japan Bioindustry Award Grand Prize (2021)
- 27^{th} Momofuku Ando Award Grand Prize (2023)
- Honorary Citizen of Tsuruoka City (2023)

=== Other activities ===
Tomita has also been active in sports administration and promotion. In 1992, he helped establish the Japan Touch and Flag Football Association and served as its chairman. Since 2011, he has served as General Manager of Keio University's soccer team. Under his management, the team finished third in the 2012 All Japan University Football Championship. In 2019, he founded the International Badminton U16 Shonai tournament and has served as chairman of its organizing committee.
