= Keio Gijuku =

Keio Gijuku may refer to:

- Keio Gijuku (Gakkō Hōjin), the administrative body of the Keio University and its affiliated institutions
- Keio University, a university operated by the organisation mentioned above
