= Keio Gijuku (Gakkō Hōjin) =

Japanese education institute

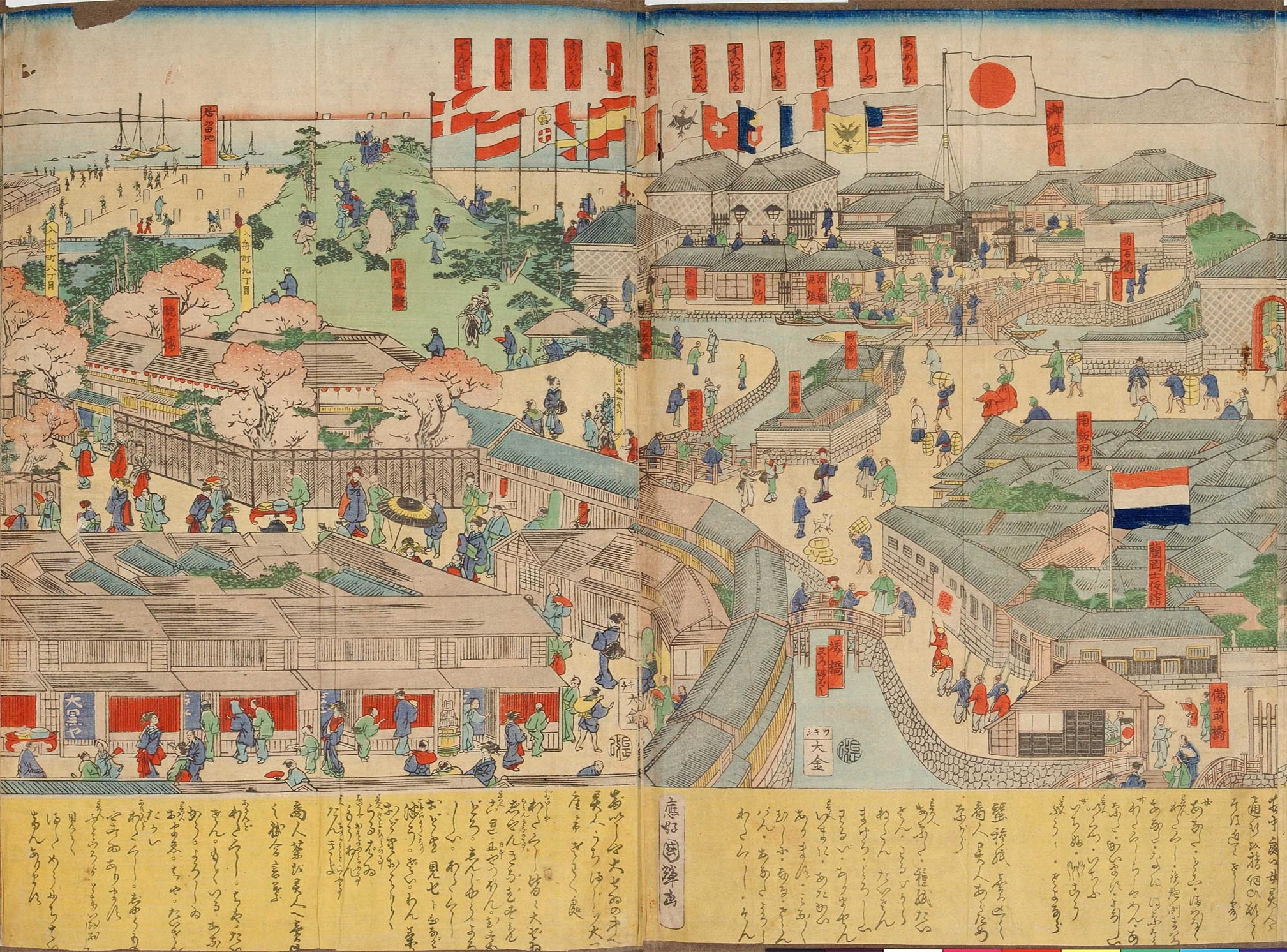
Keio served as Dutch education institution during Ansei era in foreign settlement, Tokyo.

Keio Gijuku (慶應義塾, Keiō Gijuku) is a Gakkō Hōjin (学校法人), or incorporated educational institution of Japan registered under the Private Institutions Act of 1949 (私立学校法, Shiritsu Gakkō Hō) in 1951. Keio University, which was authorised as a university under the Edict of Universities of 1920 (大学令, Daigaku Rei), is the core component of today's Keio Gijuku.

== Overview ==
Keio Gijuku was founded in Edo in 1858 by the Japanese educationist Fukuzawa Yukichi as an Anglo-Dutch style private school (義塾, Gijuku), and was meant to spread Western knowledge for modern civilisation. Later it was renamed "Keiō Gijuku" and was relocated in 1868 (Keiō 4). In 1890, the first university faculties were established at the early modern Keio University, and the original curriculum was rebranded as 'Secondary section' (普通部, Futsūbu). Today's Keio education system was formed under the Private Institutions Act of 1949 in the post-war era.

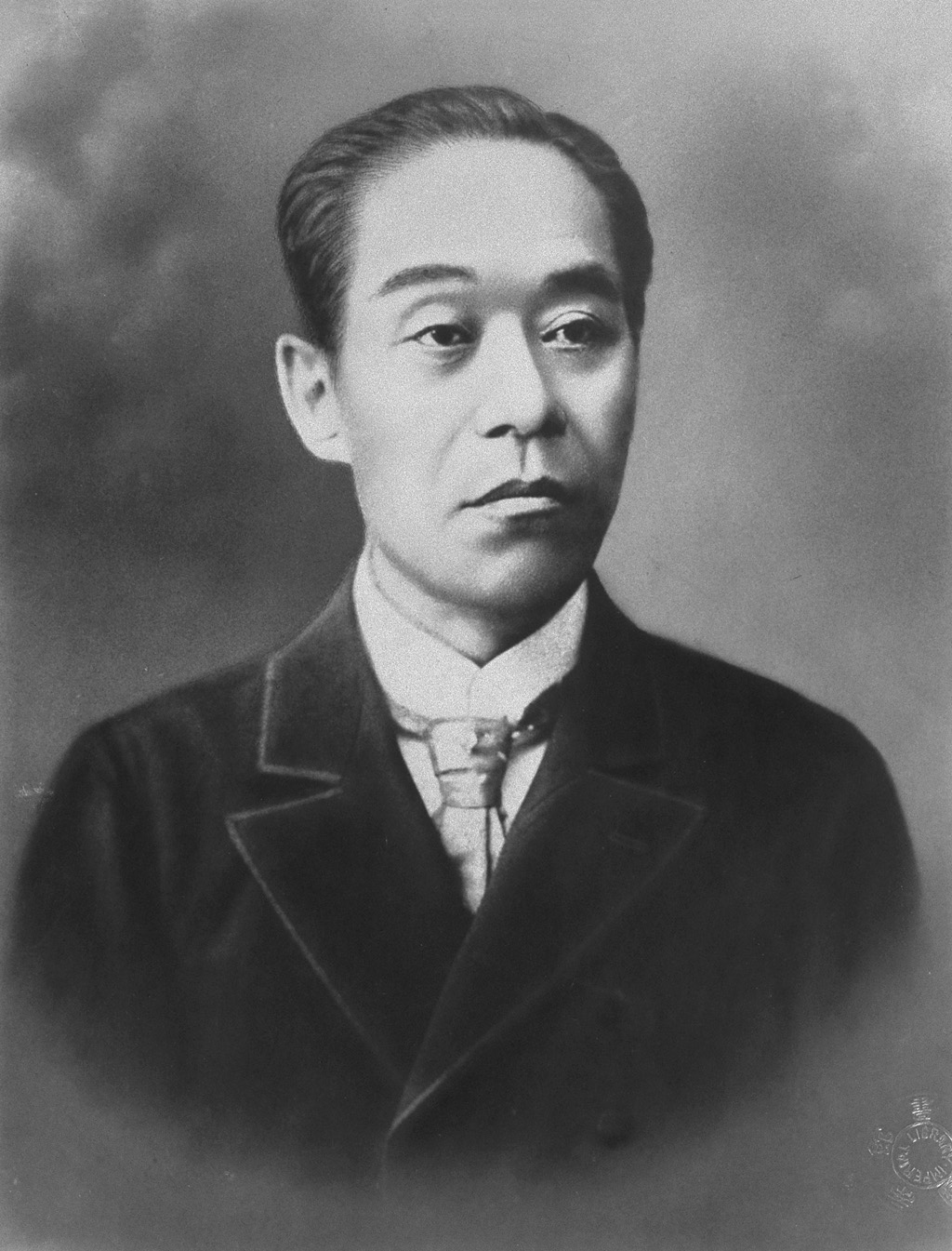
Fukuzawa Yukichi, the founder of Keio.

== Attached school ==
Keio Gijuku currently operates:

- Higher Education
  - Keio University (慶應義塾大学, Keiō Gijuku Daigaku)
- Secondary Education
  - Keio Shonan-Fujisawa Junior and Senior High School (慶應義塾湘南藤沢中等部・高等部, Keiō Gijuku Shōnan Fujisawa Chūtōbu - Kōtōbu)
  - Keio Senior High School (慶應義塾高等学校, Keiō Gijuku Kōtōgakkō)
  - Keio Girls Senior High School (慶應義塾女子高等学校, Keiō Gijuku Joshi Kōtōgakkō)
  - Keio Shiki Senior High School (慶應義塾志木高等学校, Keiō Gijuku Shiki Kōtōgakkō)
  - Keio Chutobu Junior High School (慶應義塾中等部, Keiō Gijuku Chūtōbu)
  - Keio Futsubu School (Boys Junior High School) (慶應義塾普通部, Keiō Gijuku Futsubu)
  - Keio Academy of New York (慶應義塾ニューヨーク学院, Keiō Gijuku Nyūyōku Gakuin)
- Elementary Education
  - Keio Yochisha Elementary School (慶應義塾幼稚舎, Keiō Gijuku Yōchisha)
  - Keio Yokohama Elementary School (慶應義塾横浜初等部, Keiō Gijuku Yokohama Shotōbu)
- Language Education
  - Keio Foreign Language School (慶應義塾外国語学校, Keiō Gijuku Gaikokugo Gakkō)
