= Nikkei Brazilians at a Brazilian School in Japan =

2008 book by Toshiko Sugino

Nikkei Brazilians at a Brazilian School in Japan: Factors Affecting Language Decisions and Education
- Author: Toshiko Sugino
- Language: English
- Subject: Brazilian community in Hamamatsu, Japan
- Publisher: Keio University Press
- Publication date: 2008

Nikkei Brazilians at a Brazilian School in Japan: Factors Affecting Language Decisions and Education is a 2008 English-language book by Toshiko Sugino (杉野 俊子 Sugino Toshiko), published by the Keio University Press. The book discusses a Brazilian school located in Hamamatsu, Japan and the Brazilian community of that city. The book has a focus on how Brazilians in the city decide whether to use Brazilian schools or traditional Japanese public schools.

Sugino cited Gordon, who conducted a survey with a sample of Brazilians and conducted interviews of Brazilian school teachers and staff as well as Brazilian parents.
