= Condominium reconstruction in Japan =

Renewal of housing in Japan

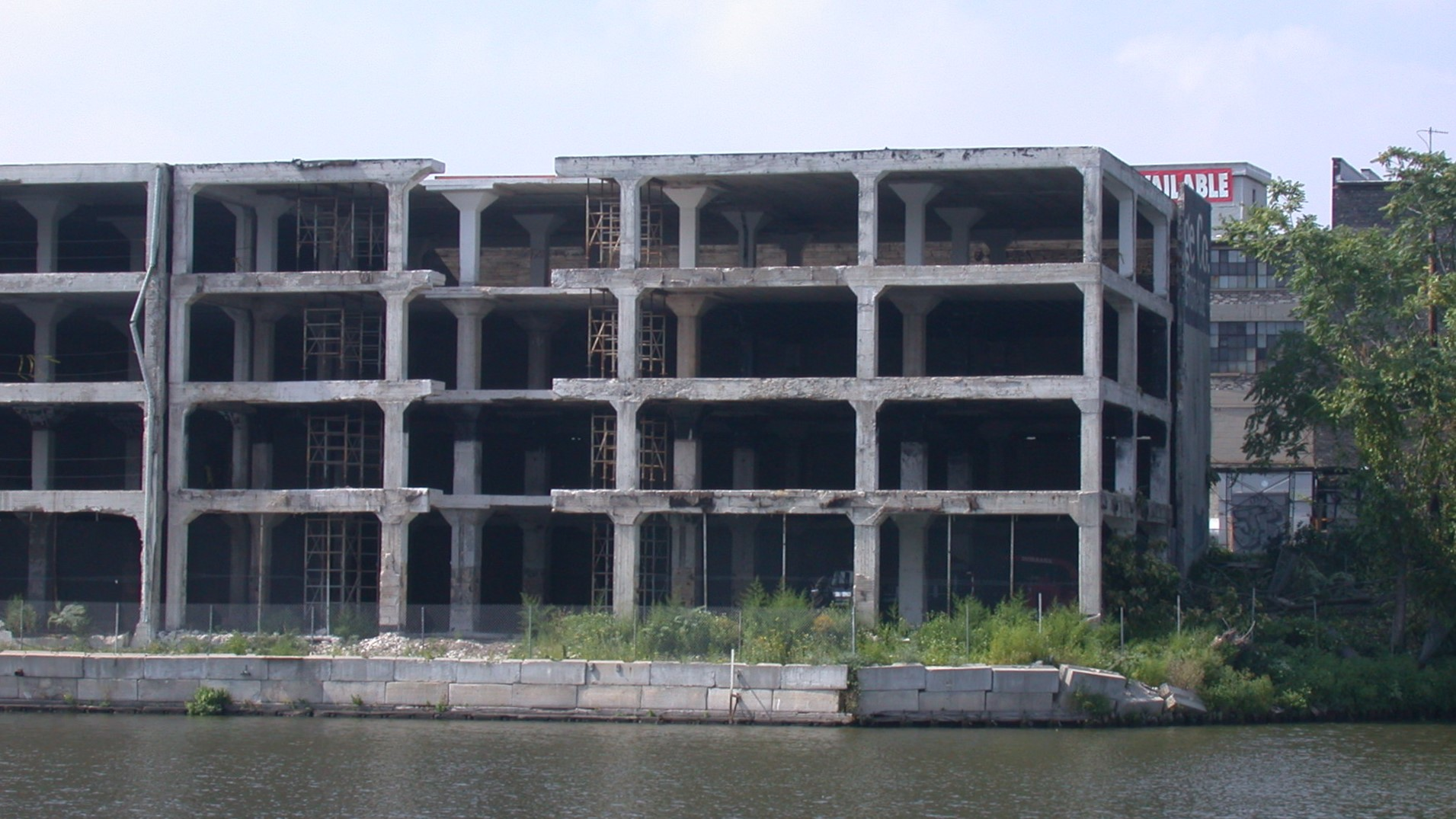
An aged, run down condominium.

In Japan, in order to promote the reconstruction of condominiums (マンション建替え, manshon tatekae) in response to their deterioration and the progressively aging population, laws such as the Act of Facilitation of Reconstruction of Condominiums have been enacted.

The full-scale construction of condominiums in Japan began in earnest after 1950, becoming common after 1970. In the early 2000s, the aging of these condominiums gradually became a problem. Particularly after the Great Hanshin-Awaji Earthquake on January 17, 1995, there were increasing calls for seismic reinforcement measures for condominiums built prior to 1980 under the old earthquake resistance standards.

Then, in 2002, laws such as the Act on Facilitation of Reconstruction of Condominiums were enacted, and the momentum for condominium reconstruction was accelerated nationwide.

Furthermore, the Great East Japan Earthquake on March 11, 2011, heightened concerns about a potential earthquake directly hitting the Tokyo metropolitan area, leading to increased reconstruction consultations. The Facilitation Act was revised in 2014 to include measures such as easing floor area ratio restrictions.

However, there are nearly one million condominiums built before 1980 under the old seismic standards nationwide, and reconstruction efforts tend to be concentrated in urban areas where funding can be raised.

Haseko Corporation, a major real estate company, also established a condominium building revitalization division specifically focused on reconstruction.

In 2011, Asahi Kasei Homes established the Condominium Reconstruction Research Institute, which won the Good Design Award in 2013 in the public service and system category.

Nippon Steel Kowa Real Estate Co., Ltd. collaborated with the Institute of Gerontology at the University of Tokyo and established a research group on condominium reconstruction issues for a super-aging society.

In 2010, the Conference on Aging Condominium Countermeasures (composed of researchers and experts and chaired by Takeo Shiina) was established to make recommendations to government agencies regarding condominium reconstruction.

There exists an industry organization for condominium reconstruction called the Condominium Regeneration Council, chaired by Professor Shigenori Hayashi, Professor Emeritus at Yokohama National University.

== Reconstruction methods and support ==
A common approach is to utilize unused floor area ratios to rebuild low-rise into high-rise buildings and sell the increased number of units to raise reconstruction costs. However, in cases where the floor area ratio is already fully utilized, even if there is an agreement on rebuilding, insufficient funds may raise concerns about the viability of future reconstruction.

The Ministry of Land, Infrastructure, Transport, and Tourism prepared a manual to promote smooth reconstruction. Additionally, it is possible to utilize resources such as the Urban Revitalization Housing System and urban development loans provided by the Japan Housing Finance Agency.

== Tokyo Metropolitan Government’s initiatives ==
After the legal amendment of the Condominium Reconstruction Act in 2015, the Tokyo Metropolitan Government established the Floor Area Ratio Permit Guidelines to promote condominium reconstruction, relaxing the floor area ratio (special wards such as Minato Ward have also established similar guidelines).

In 2017, the Tokyo Metropolitan Government established the Tokyo Metropolitan Condominium Revitalization and Community Development System and has designated promotional areas to encourage condominium reconstruction.

To accelerate the reconstruction of aging condominiums and create a disaster-resistant city, the government planned a new system for 2019 that would allow real estate companies to purchase old condominiums and add extra floor area ratio to new developments elsewhere.

The Tokyo Metropolitan Foundation for Disaster Prevention and Community Development dispatches advisors for condominium reconstruction.
