= Kakutarō =

- Gender: Male

Origin
- Origin: Japanese
- Meaning: Different meanings depending on the kanji used

Kakutarō, Kakutaro, Kakutarou or Kakutaroh (written: 恪太郎 or 角太郎) is a masculine Japanese given name. Notable people with the name include:

- Iwakaze Kakutaro (岩風 角太郎; 1934–1988), Japanese sumo wrestler
- Kakutarō Kitashiro (北城 恪太郎; born 1944), Japanese businessman
