= Charcoal Filter =

Japanese band

- Origin: Tokyo, Japan
- Genres: Rock, pop
- Years active: 1996 - 2007
- Labels: Powerpop Records.com (1999 - 2000); Columbia Music Entertainment (2001 - 2003); Warner Music Japan (2003 - 2004); Nippon Crown (2006 - 2007); Fake Tan (2014 - Present)
- Past members: Takahiro Konagawa; Yuzo Otsuka; Yuki Yasui; Shintaro Takano; Anastasia
- Website: Official Website

Charcoal Filter (チャコールフィルター), also known as Charcofil or Chakofiru (チャコフィル) to their fans, is a Japanese male rock band. Its members are Takahiro Konagawa, Yuzo Otsuka, Yuki Yasui, and Shintaro Takano. They met each other and formed Charcoal Filter in their high school days. After graduation from high school, they came out with the song "I start again" in 1999. They are known for creating the song "Tightrope", used as the ending theme of the anime series Gensōmaden Saiyūki, back in 2000. From 2002 to 2004 they were produced by Seiji Kameda. They disbanded in 2007.

== History ==
In 1995 Konagawa, Yasui and Takano formed a band. The next year they incorporated Otsuka as a vocalist, and named the band Charcoal Filter. At first they played Green Day’s songs, which they like, and then they began to play their own songs composed by themselves.

In early 1999 they recorded several songs in New York City for debut. In September of the same year the indie album Gimme a light was released. Two months later they came out with the debut single I start again. The next year they created the song Tightrope, used as the ending theme of the anime series Gensōmaden Saiyūki.

The year 2002 the turning point in their career came. The eighth single Brand-New Myself ~Boku ni Dekiru Koto was a hit. Following this single, the album MADE IN Hi-High took the sixth place in weekly Oricon chart, as obtained them a reputation.

== Members ==
- Takahiro Konagawa (小名川高弘, B. November 30, 1979); Guitars, Background Vocals, and the Leader
- Yuzo Otsuka (大塚雄三, B. August 27, 1979); Vocals and Guitars
- Yuki Yasui (安井佑輝, B. March 5, 1980); Bass Guitars and Background Vocals
- Shintaro Takano (高野真太郎, B. October 20, 1979); Drums and Background Vocals

== Discography ==
=== Singles ===
- I start again

November 1, 1999

1. I start again
2. Let’s go
3. Nineteen
- Life goes on

February 2, 2000

1. Life goes on
2. Single word
3. Snow drive
- Don’t miss it

May 17, 2000

1. Don’t miss it
2. Turning point
- Tightrope

June 21, 2000

1. Tightrope
2. Tightrope -Medieval version-
3. Tightrope -Instrumental version-
- Kizuna (絆, Bound of Friendship)

March 9, 2001 (In-Kyūshū-Limited Single)

1. Kizuna (絆, Bound of Friendship)
2. Kizuna -Instrumental- (絆 -Instrumental-, Bound of Friendship -Instrumental-)
3. The Go-Ahead Man
- Hajikeyō (はじけよう, Let’s Have Fun!)

June 1, 2001

1. Hajikeyō (はじけよう, Let’s Have Fun!)
2. Jumpin’ high
3. Libido (リビドー)
- Kodokuna Taiyō (孤独な太陽, A Lonely Sun)

September 26, 2001

1. Kodokuna Taiyō (孤独な太陽, A Lonely Sun)
2. Communication
3. La La (ララ)
- Sotsugyō (卒業, Graduation)

January 30, 2002

1. Sotsugyō (卒業, Graduation)
2. Romantic (ロマンチック)
3. Mother Blues
- Brand-New Myself ~Boku ni Dekiru Koto (Brand-New Myself ~僕にできること, Brand-New Myself ~What I Can Do)

May 1, 2002

1. Brand-New Myself ~Boku ni Dekiru Koto (Brand-New Myself ~僕にできること, Brand-New Myself ~What I Can Do)
2. 2,000 Light Years Away
3. Brand-New Myself ~Boku ni Dekiru Koto (instrumental) (Brand-New Myself ~僕にできること (instrumental), Brand-New Myself ~What I Can Do (instrumental))
- White winter song

December 11, 2002

1. White winter song
2. WOW WOW PARADISE (WOW WOW パラダイス)
3. Sotsugyō ~Okuru Koto Version~ (卒業 ~贈ることバージョン~, Graduation ~Giving Word Version~)
4. White winter song ~Instrumental~
- Yasashisa Licence / BY MY SIDE (やさしさライセンス, Licence of a Tenderness / BY MY SIDE)

May 21, 2003

1. Yasashisa Licence (やさしさライセンス, Licence of a Tenderness)
2. BY MY SIDE
3. Yasashisa Licence -Instrumental- (やさしさライセンス -Instrumental-, Licence of a Tenderness -Instrumental-)
4. BY MY SIDE -Instrumental-
- Niji (虹, Rainbow)

August 6, 2003

1. Niji (虹, Rainbow)
2. Beautiful Sandy (ビューティフルサンディー)
3. Niji -Instrumental- (虹 -Instrumental-, Rainbow -Instrumental-)
4. Beautiful Sandy -Instrumental- (ビューティフルサンディー -Instrumental-)
- one Days (A Small Part of My Days)

July 22, 2004

1. one Days (A Small Part of My Days)
2. Kiss on the beach
3. one Days -Instrumental- (A Small Part of My Days -Instrumental-)
4. Kiss on the beach -Instrumental-

Hidden Track: Kane ga Nai (金がない, I Have No Money)

- Hitori ja Totemo Aruke nai Sekai no Ue de (一人じゃとても歩けない世界の上で, On the World that I Can’t Possibly Walk Alone)

June 7, 2006

1. Hitori ja Totemo Aruke nai Sekai no Ue de (一人じゃとても歩けない世界の上で, On the World that I Can’t Possibly Walk Alone)
2. Motto (もっと, More)
3. Arigatō (ありがとう, Thank you)

=== Albums ===
Gimme a light
September 17, 1999
Indie album (Limited to 1,000 copies only)
1. Tune up
2. Kickin’ it
3. Clap
4. It’s gonna be O.K.
5. Follow up your own mind
6. Empty Box
7. Song on the radio
8. 19

Spiky
June 21, 2000
1. Snow drive
2. Don’t miss it (Album Mix)
3. Tightrope (Album Version)
4. My red boots
5. Ideal
6. D’d
7. Life goes on (Album Mix)
8. Spiky
9. Single word
10. Turning point
11. Kick up myself
12. Time passed by
13. Say what you say
14. Cultural blind
15. I start again

PANIC POP
November 1, 2001
1. Hajikeyō (はじけよう, Let’s Have Fun!)
2. PANIC POP
3. I wish on my fist
4. Communication
5. Yoake no Mukō (夜明けの向こう, Over the Dawn)
6. Tegami (Acoustic Version) (手紙 (Acoustic Version), Letter (Acoustic Version))
7. Kodokuna Taiyō (Album Mix) (孤独な太陽 (Album Mix), A Lonely Sun (Album Mix))
8. Hitori Kakeochi (ひとり駆け落ち, Eloping Alone)
9. Bring Out
10. Asu wa Dotchida (明日はどっちだ, Where is Tomorrow?)
11. 11 nights a week
12. Runner (ランナー)
13. Sayonara (サヨナラ, Good-by)

MADE IN Hi-High
September 4, 2002
1. Music
2. Liberty
3. Kazematic (Wind Town)
4. Brand-New Myself
5. Lonely holiday
6. Seeds of future
7. Happy hungry days
8. Nichijō (日常, Daily Life)

C☆BEST + Flying Hi-High
July 9, 2003
Best album
1. Yasashisa Licence ~Mitsuketa ver.~ (やさしさライセンス ~見つけたver.~, Licence of a Tenderness ~Found ver.~)
2. Asu wa Dotchida (明日はどっちだ, Where is Tomorrow?)
3. WOW WOW PARADISE (WOW WOW パラダイス)
4. Kodokuna Taiyō (孤独な太陽, A Lonely Sun)
5. Communication
6. Jumpin’ high
7. Sotsugyō (卒業, Graduation)
8. Nichijō (日常, Daily Life)
9. Hajikeyō (はじけよう, Let’s Have Fun!)
10. Happy hungry days
11. Hitori Kakeochi (ひとり駆け落ち, Eloping Alone)
12. Brand-New Myself ~Boku ni Dekiru Koto (Brand-New Myself ~僕にできること, Brand-New Myself ~What I Can Do)
13. White winter song
14. Liberty
15. Libido (リビドー)
16. Romantic (ロマンチック)
17. someday somewhere
18. Star Dash (スターダッシュ)

HAPPY SET
September 25, 2003
1. Niji (虹, Rainbow)
2. Nana port (7port)
3. Ame ga Agareba Natsu ga Hajimaru (雨が上がれば夏が始まる, When the Rain Stops, Summer Starts)
4. Yasashisa Licence (やさしさライセンス, Licence of a Tenderness)
5. Yellow Cabriolet (イエローキャブリオーレ)
6. My girl
7. Satsuki (皐月, May)
8. Demo Tape (Kari) (デモテープ (仮), Demo Tape (Interim Title))

CHARCOAL FILTER
September 23, 2004
1. Party on!
2. Ukiyo no Hana (浮き世の花, Flower in this World)
3. one Days (A Small Part of My Days)
4. Cage
5. Panorama (パノラマ)
6. Koke to Ratai (コケトラタイ, Moss and Naked Body)
7. Lover Lover
8. Radio Motown
9. Yume no Soba ni Aru Sekai de (夢のそばにある世界で, At the World near a Dream)
10. Squash (スカッシュ)
11. Sayonara Boku wa (さよなら僕は, Good-by, and I am...)
12. GROOVIN’ SUNRISE
13. Morning Glow
14. Puka Puka (プカプカ, Puffing Away)

Gimme a light 2
May 11, 2005
Indie album (Limited to 5,000 copies only)
1. Tune up featuring Annie
2. a party song
3. Workin’ Dog after work
4. Place
5. Honey Money
6. Love
7. music slave

Kokoro no Kita Michi
(心の来た道, The Way My Soul has Come by)
February 8, 2006
1. Sekai no Hate (世界の果て, The World’s End)
2. Kokoro no Kita Michi (心の来た道, The Way My Soul has Come by)
3. Ai o Baramaite (愛をばらまいて, Giving Much Love)
4. Music Monster
5. Spider (スパイダー)
6. Peace People

Everything you know is wrong
January 10, 2007
1. Asu e Hanate (明日へ放て, Release it towards Tomorrow)
2. everlasting
3. society
4. Small Wonderland (スモールワンダーランド)
5. Futatsu Boshi (ふたつ星, A Pair of Stars)
6. aurora
7. sunnyday holiday
8. Muffin Song (マフィンソング)
9. Ashita to yū Na no Kinō ni Sayonara (明日という名の昨日にさよなら, Good-by to Yesterday by the Name of Tomorrow)
10. Yell (エール)
11. Hitori ja Totemo Aruke nai Sekai no Ue de (一人じゃとても歩けない世界の上で, On the World that I Can’t Possibly Walk Alone)

=== DVDs ===
- CHARCOAL FILTER MEN SOUL

January 1, 2003

- Waku Waku Charcoal Fair 2003 o Charcoal Filter to Miru DVD

わくわくチャコールフェア2003をチャコールフィルターと観るDVD
Let’s See The Exciting Charcoal Fair 2003 with Charcoal Filter!
February 21, 2004

- Waku Waku Charcoal Fair 2004 o Charcoal Filter to You DVD

わくわくチャコールフェア2004をチャコールフィルターと酔うDVD
Let’s Enjoy The Exciting Charcoal Fair 2004 with Charcoal Filter!
March 18, 2005

- 5th Anniversary Special Live Party at Shibuya O-East

March 18, 2005

- Waku Waku Charcoal Fair 2005

わくわくチャコールフェア2005
The Exciting Charcoal Fair 2005
March 18, 2006

- "2006 Kokoro no Yuku Michi" Tour Final 2006.5.27 SHIBUYA CLUB QUATTRO

「2006 心の行く道」ツアーファイナル 2006.5.27 SHIBUYA CLUB QUATTRO
The Way of My Soul 2006 Tour Final on May 27, 2006 at Shibuya Club Quattro
July 15, 2006

== Concert history ==
Charcoal Filter often give a live concert. They have played all Japanese prefectures. Their performance is appreciated by their own generation. Also, Konagawa and Otsuka appeared at well-known Japanese musical event Dream Power John Lennon Super Live back in 2003.

- Spiky night (July - August, 2000)
- Spread out GIG 20-21 (November, 2000 - January, 2001)
- "弾" 前哨戦 in ライヴハウス (Precedent Tour to Dan, April, 2001)
- Spark out GIG "弾" (Spark out GIG Dan, June, 2001)
- PANIC POP TOUR (January, 2002)
- B.N.M. 02 (July - August, 2002)
- Made in TOUR & TOUR the Hi-High (November, 2002)
- スプリンターツアー (Sprinter Tour, February - April, 2003)
- わくわくチャコールフェア2003 (The Exciting Charcoal Fair 2003, April, 2003)
- Hallin’ Love (July - August, 2003)
- KINGDOM後夜祭 (Final Festival of Kingdom, November, 2003)
- スプリンターツアー2 ~Happy Set~ (Sprinter Tour 2 ~Happy Set~, December, 2003 - March, 2004)
- わくわくチャコールフェア2004 (The Exciting Charcoal Fair 2004, April, 2004)
- スプリンターツアー2 ファイナル 47都道府県ワンマン制覇記念ライヴ (Sprinter Tour 2 Final Memorial Concert of Touring All Around Japan, April, 2004)
- Re: HOME (October, 2004)
- 5th Anniversary Special Live Party (October, 2004)
- ジュポ～ンツアー (Jupōn Tour, December, 2004)
- Japan tour, 47 (March - July, 2005)
- わくわくチャコールフェア2005 (The Exciting Charcoal Fair 2005, April, 2005)
- Gimme a night (June - August, 2005)
- Gimme a 2006 The 忘年会 (Gimme a 2006 The Year-End Party, December, 2005)
- わくわくチャコールフェア2006 (The Exciting Charcoal Fair 2006, April, 2006)
- 2006 心の行く道 (The Way of My Soul 2006, May, 2006)
