= Kakutarō Kitashiro =

Japanese businessperson

- 北城 恪太郎
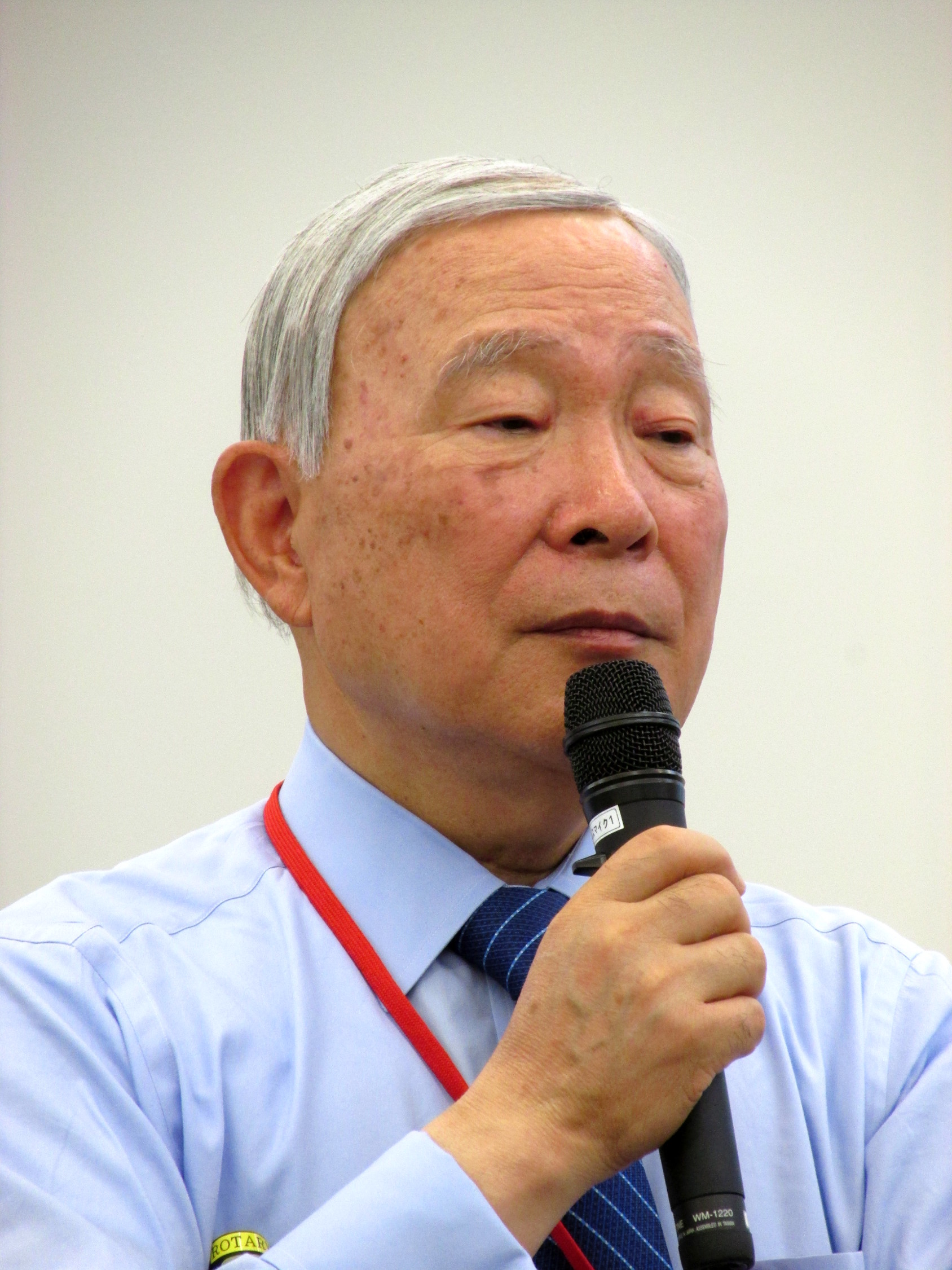
- Born: April 21, 1944 (age 82); Yūki, Ibaraki, Japan
- Education: Keio University (BS), University of California at Berkeley (MS)
- Occupations: Systems engineer, business executive

Kakutaro Kitashiro (北城 恪太郎, Kitashiro Kakutaro; born April 21, 1944) is a Japanese systems engineer and business executive. He was the president of IBM Japan, Ltd., IBM's Japanese subsidiary, in 1993–1999, and of IBM Asia Pacific Corporation in 1999–2003, and contributed to the development of the IT business in Japan and Asia-Pacific. He was also the chairperson of Japan Association of Corporate Executives in 2003–2006, and the chair of the Board of Trustees of International Christian University, Tokyo, in 2010–2019. He earned a BS degree from Keio University in 1967 and an MS degree from the University of California at Berkeley in 1972.

== Early life and education ==
Kakutaro Kitashiro was born on April 21, 1944, in Yuki City, Ibaraki Prefecture, while his mother Tokuko (とく子) stayed, during the last stage of the Second World War, at her parents' home, but his birth was registered at the address of his father Taiji Kitashiro (北城大治) in Chiyoda, Tokyo. Kakutarō was the eldest of their three children. He attended the local elementary school in Tokyo, and the middle and high schools attached to Keio University.

He studied engineering management at Keio University, earning a BS degree in 1967. After he worked for IBM for three years, Taro, as he was called during his student days in U.S., took a two-year leave of absence to study electrical engineering and computer science at the graduate school of University of California at Berkeley, from which he received an MS degree in 1972.

== IBM career ==
Kitashiro started to work for IBM Japan in April 1967 as a systems engineer trainee in the public sector branch office in Tokyo. In 1970, he obtained Japan's overseas scholarship and studied at the graduate engineering school of University of California at Berkeley, earning an MS degree in 1972. Returning to Japan, he worked at IBM's branch offices and, from 1981, became the development manager of the then important banking project in the Marketing Division.

In 1983, Kita-san, as he was called when speaking in English at IBM, moved to Armonk, New York, and worked as an administrative assistant to John Opel, CEO of IBM Corporation for one year. Back in Japan, he was elected on the board of directors of IBM Japan in 1986.

In 1991, he became vice-president of IBM Japan, and, from 1993 to 1999, was the president (CEO), succeeding Takeo Shiina. Kitashiro's presidency was one of the most difficult times for IBM as a whole when Louis Gerstner was brought in, and for IBM Japan because of the increased competition from the Japanese computer manufacturers, backed up by the powerful Ministry of International Trade and Industry.

In 1999, he became President of IBM Asia-Pacific Region, which included IBM's businesses in East Asia (China, Hong Kong, India, Korea, Japan, Philippines, Taiwan, etc.) and Oceania (Australia, New Zealand, etc.). From 1999 to 2007, he was the supreme chairperson of IBM Japan, and, since 2017, has been the honorary executive advisor.

== Outside of IBM ==
From 1994, Kitashiro began contributing to Keizai Doyukai, the influential Japan Association of Corporate Executives, and, from 2003 to 2007, was its chairperson.

In 2010-2019, he was the Chair of the Board of Trustees of International Christian University, in Mitaka, Tokyo, which is the liberal arts college built by the donations of the Christians, domestic as well as American, after World War II at the site where the Zero fighters had been manufactured during the war.

== Publication ==
Kitashiro has authored or co-authored several books in Japanese. They are mostly on customer relationship management and advice to young people.

== Personal life ==
According to the publicly available information, toward graduation from the middle school, Kitashiro was told by his teacher to study English more because he was not doing well on that subject, and so in high school, he put extra effort to study English: hearing that there was a Sunday school taught in English, he attended the church and was baptized in 1967, and has remained a Christian ever since. He married Midori Kumasaka (熊坂みどり), who was baptized at the same time as he. They have three children who are now all independent.

== See also ==
- Takeo Shiina

President of IBM Japan, Ltd.
Previous	1993-1999	Next
Takeo Shiina	Kakutaro Kitashiro	Takuma Otoshi (大歳卓麻)
