= Takahiro Konagawa =

- Born: Takahiro Konagawa 小名川 高弘; November 30, 1979 (age 46)
- Origin: Chiba, Japan
- Genres: Rock, pop
- Years active: 2003–present
- Label: Daiji Music
- Website: Official Website

Takahiro Konagawa (小名川 高弘, Konagawa Takahiro; born November 30, 1979 in Ōita Prefecture), nicknamed Kona, is a Japanese guitarist, singer, and musical composer from Kashiwa, Chiba. He came out as a guitarist of Charcoal Filter in November 1999. He has also performed as a solo artist since December 2003. His first solo album The first tears was released in July 2006. He played guitar on the Puffy AmiYumi song Tokyo I'm on My Way

== Discography ==
The first tears

(July 19, 2006)

1. tears
2. Stop Magic
3. Inori (祈り, Prayer)
4. Melody
5. Mokutekichi (目的地, Destination)
6. Mercy Drive

== Composition ==
Konagawa is composing all of his songs and many of Charcoal Filter's songs. For example, Sotsugyō (卒業, Graduation), BY MY SIDE, Niji (虹, Rainbow). In addition he composed the following songs for Takashi Tsukamoto and Satomi Yoshida.

- Boku no Koe (僕の声, My Voice) by Takashi Tsukamoto
- Grapefruit Moon (グレープフルーツムーン) by Satomi Yoshida
- Quatre Saisons (キャトルセゾン, Four Seasons) by Satomi Yoshida
