= Takeo Shiina =

Japanese businessman (1929–2023)

Takeo Shiina (Japanese: 椎名武雄, May 11, 1929 – April 19, 2023) was a Japanese business executive who contributed to the IT industry of the world as well as of Japan.

== Early life and education ==
Takeo Shiina was born in Seki, Gifu, Japan on May 11, 1929. His parents, originally from Tokyo, managed a ceramics plant at that time. Tak spent his elementary school days there, but studied at the middle and high schools attached to Keio University in Tokyo.

Shiina had a BS in engineering from Keio University's Engineering School in March 1951, and then studied at Bucknell University, Pennsylvania, United States, receiving another BS degree in mechanical engineering in 1953.

== IBM's Japanese subsidiary ==
Upon his return to Japan in 1953, Shiina started to work for the Japanese subsidiary of IBM Corporation, in the manufacturing department, actually a small assembly facility near Haneda Airport. He became the manager of IBM's Chidoricho Plant in 1960, and then the head of IBM Japan's manufacturing department. After working as head of personnel, marketing, and finance departments, he was appointed president of IBM Japan, Ltd., in 1975.

During his tenure as president, IBM Japan experienced phenomenal growth during this time of IBM System/360 and System/370 computers, in spite of large import tax for imported high-tech products and the stiff competition with the three Japanese mainframe computer groups (Fujitsu-Hitachi, NEC-Toshiba, and Mitsubishi Electric-Oki) that Japan's Ministry of International Trade and Industry had arranged and subsidized. IBM eventually registered an annual revenue of 1,000,000,000,000 yen, showing an unheard-of success of a foreign company in Japan, where foreign companies were barred to again any significant business in the post-World War II period.

In 1993, he became chairperson of IBM Japan as Kakutaro Kitashiro became president. In 1999, he became the supreme adviser as Kitashiro was appointed chairperson and Takuma Otoshi was president.

== For Japan's industries ==
Shiina contributed to the Japanese business world as a lifetime member of the influential Japan Association of Corporate Executives. He was also vice chairman of the board of council, and chairman of the committee of foreign-affiliated corporation, Japan Federation of Economic Organizations. His interest was in the productivity of both employees and executives, and was vice president of Japan Productivity Center. He was on the boards of directors of Hoya Corporation, Mitsui O.S.K. Lines, Meiji Seika and Mercian Corporation.

== For Asia-Pacific and the world ==
Shiina also contributed to the IT industry of Asia Pacific as a member of the board of IBM World Trade Asia/Pacific Corporation. From 1989-93, he also served as vice president of IBM Corporation during the most difficult time of IBM. He contributed for IBM to realize the growth potential of the Asia Pacific region, and is quoted as saying, "I sell IBM to Japan, but I sell Japan to IBM".

== Recognition ==
In 1990, Takeo Shiina received the Purple Ribbon of Honor of the Japanese government. In 1994, the Prime Minister of Japan recognized Shiina's contributions to his country's international trade policy development with a Trade Award. In 2003, he was awarded the Grand Cordon of the Order of the Sacred Treasure, Japan's highest decoration, by the emperor in 2000.

In 2008, Shiina received the Outstanding Contribution Award from his alma mater, Bucknell University.

== Publication ==
In 2001, Shiina was invited to write an autobiography in a series of articles in the "My Curriculum Vitae" column of the Nihon Keizai Shimbun, where Louis V. Gerstner Jr. also participated in 1992. Shiina's autobiography was later made a book, "Living with Foreign Companies in Japan", in Japanese.

President of IBM Japan, Ltd.
Previous	1975–1993	Next
Sanae Inagaki (稲垣早苗)	Takeo Shiina	Kakutarō Kitashiro
