= Seiichiro Katsura =

Seiichiro Katsura (桂 誠一郎, Katsura Seiichirō) is a Japanese motion control specialist.

Katsura works at the Keio University and publishes numerous of his peer-reviewed articles in such journals as IEEE Transactions on Industrial Electronics and many others which were cited over 100 times as of 2013. In 2013, he invented a robot that is able to draw Japanese characters by having the skills of Juho Sado, a Japanese calligrapher. During the same year he also participated at the CEATEC exhibition in Japan and the same year on October 7, was interviewed by the Octahedral Chemical Daily regarding the Peltier effect, following by Nikkan Kogyo Shimbun news agency on October 31.
