= Campuses of Keio University =

College campuses in Japan

Keio University (慶應義塾) is a private university in Tokyo, Japan. Due to its age, its campuses have many historic buildings. This article introduces some of the school's notable architecture.

== Mita campus ==
In 1858, Fukuzawa Yukichi founded the Rangaku-jyuku (蘭学塾, Western School). Ten years later the school's name changed to Keio Gijyuku (慶應義塾); in 1871 it moved to Mita, its main campus. The campus has a number of historic structures.

Maboroshi no mon
The former main gate, the original black wooden gate dated to the Edo period. The present stone gate was built in 1913. In 2000, the gate was moved to top of a sloping stone walkway.

Mita Enzetsu kan (三田演説館, Mita Speech Hall)
The original building was constructed in 1876. In 1947 the tile-roofed, two-story, Western-style wooden building was restored, and in 1967 it was designated an important cultural property.

Inari yama
Inari yama is atop a flight of stone steps near the Speech Hall. Its name originated from the Inari-shi (稲荷祠, little Ynari shrine), built by the Shimabara clan, which was previously located there. Although the shrine is gone, its name persisted after the university's founding.

Keio Gijyuku Toshokan kyūkan (慶應義塾図書館旧館, Old Keio Gijyuku library)
The old library and the Speech Hall are iconic campus buildings. The library was completed in 1912 as part of the university's 50th-anniversary celebrations. Designed by Sone Tatsuzō with his architectural partner Chujo Seiichiro. It includes the Fukuzawa Memorial Center of modern Japanese studies and the Institute of Oriental Classics (Shido Bunko).

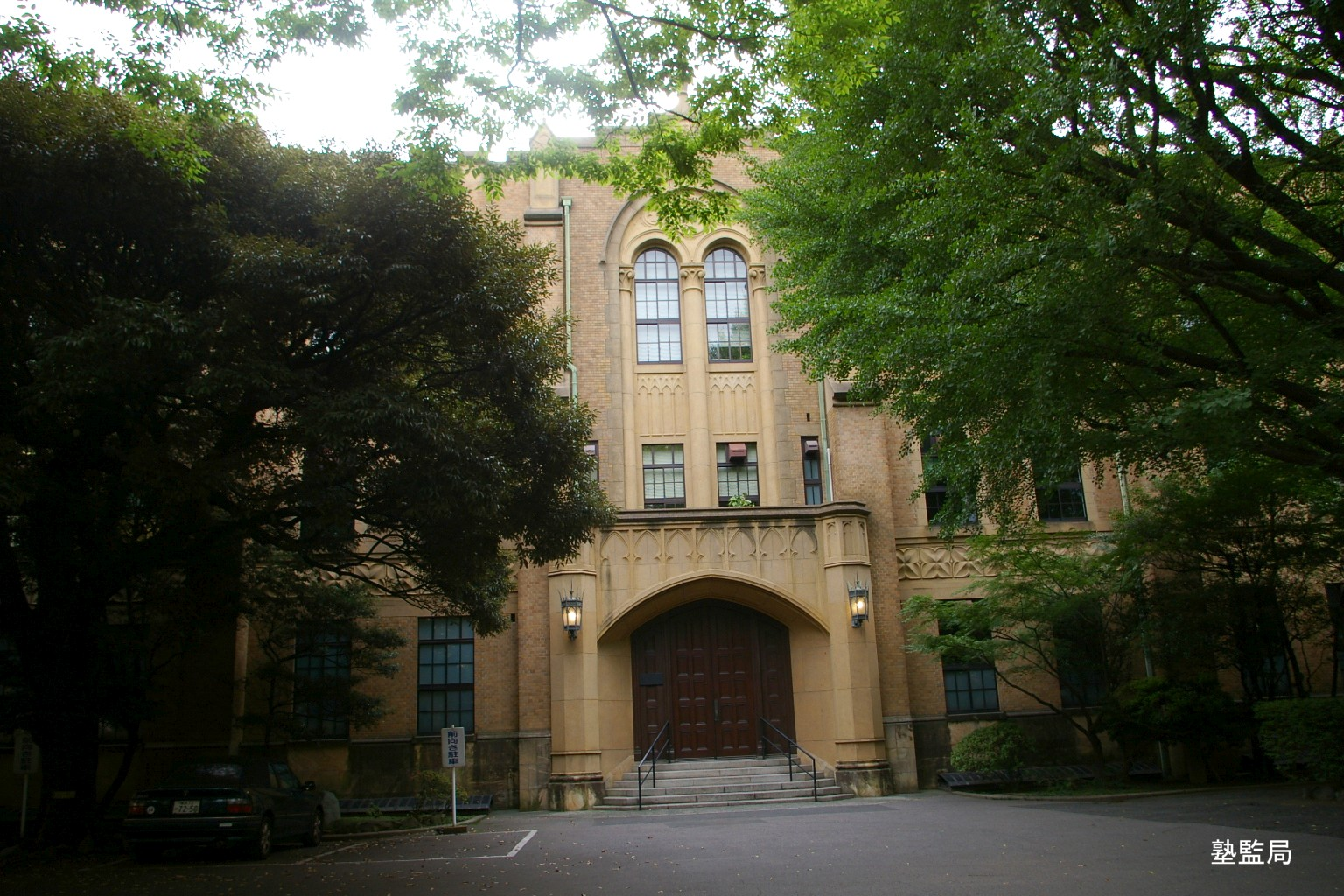
Administration building

Jukukan-kyoku (塾監局, Administration building)
The campus administration building is known as Jyukukan-kyoku. Completed in 1926, it replaced a two-story brick building dating to 1886. Jyukukan-kyoku houses a number of departments, offices and meeting rooms.

New Minami kōsha (南校舎(新), South school building)
Built in 2011, the new Minami kōsha was part of the university's 150th-anniversary celebration. Its design is similar in its modernism to the old Minami kōsha. The building has a mixture of lecture, study and multipurpose rooms.

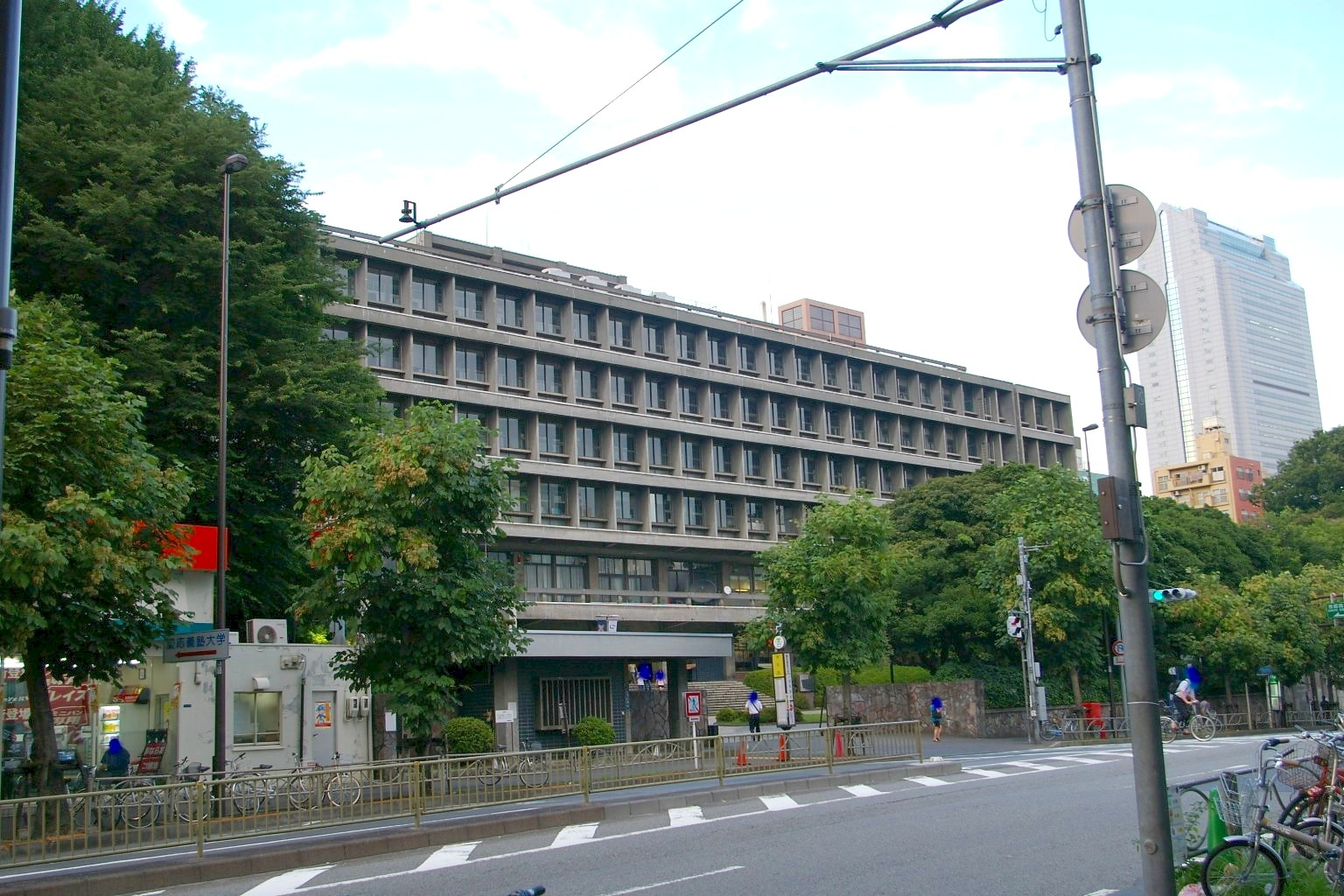
Old Minami kōsha

Mita kōsha (南校舎(旧), Old school building)
The old school building was constructed for the university's centenary in 1959. The 36-room building, with a capacity of 2,721, was the largest building on the Mita campus for many years.

Higashi kan (東館, East Research Building)
Built in 2000, the East Research Building was designed like an old brick library. Near Maboroshi no mon, its arch features a quotation by Fukuzawa Yukichi in Latin: Homo nec ullas cuiquam praepositus nec subditus creatur ("Heaven does not make one man better or worse than others"). The Kuraiton Kafe (クライトンカフェ, Crichton cafe) is named for American writer and medical doctor Michael Crichton.

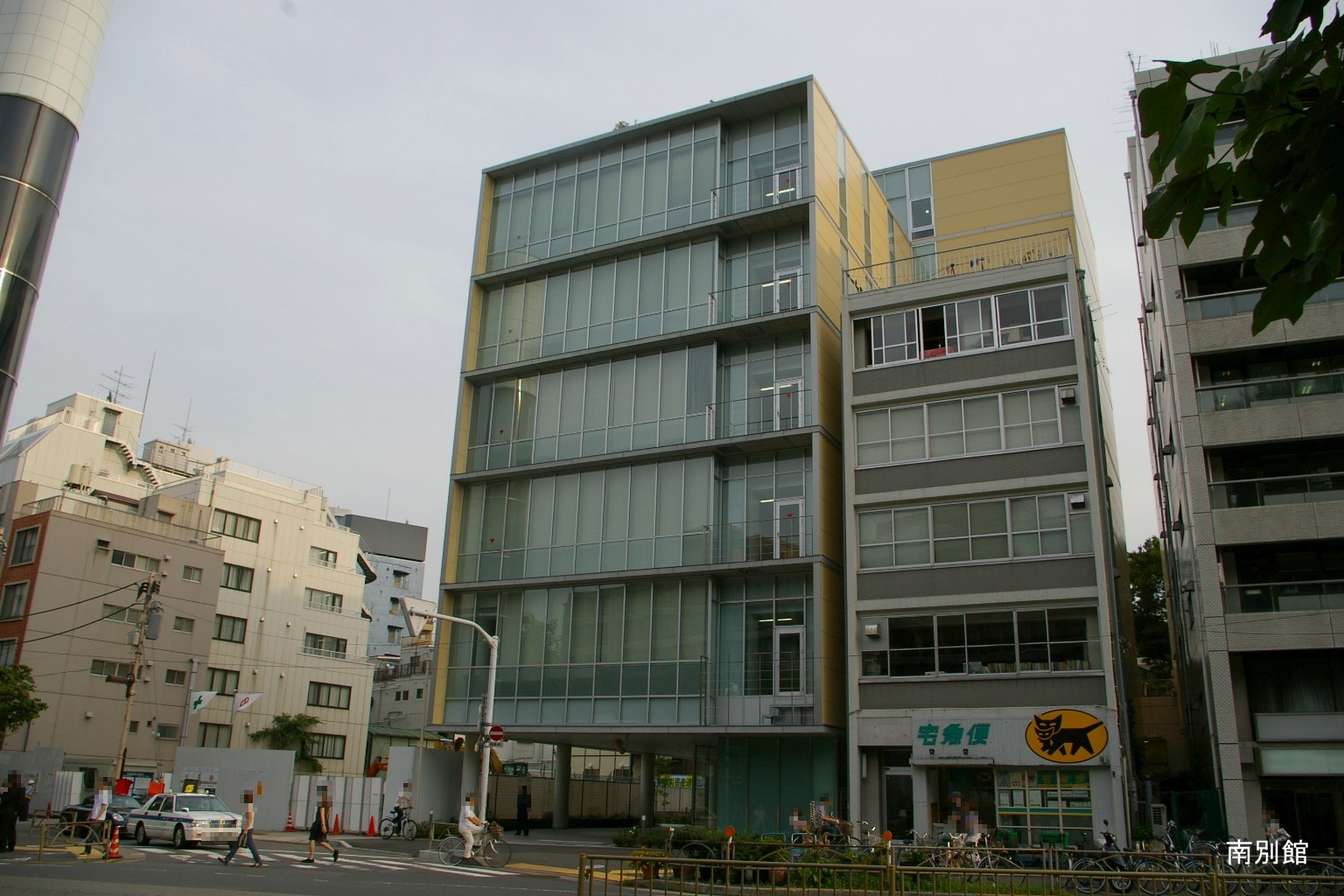
South Annex

Minami bekkan (南別館, South Annex)
The South Annex was built in 2009 to provide lecture space during the construction of the south building. The annex is headquarters for research coordination and administration, a research and administration center for the arts and a training room for the graduate school of human relations and the Institute of Cultural and Linguistic Studies.

Toshokan shin kan (図書館新館, New library)
Designed by Fumihiko Maki, the new library was completed in 1982. The building has six stories above ground and five underground. Maki won the 1982 BCS prize for his design.

Minami kan (南館, South Building)
Built by Taisei Corporation in 2005, the seismically-isolated, reinforced-concrete South Building has eleven stories above ground and five underground. The building has classrooms, offices and training and counseling rooms.

New Banraisha
Banraisha is a social club for alumni, teachers and students. Designed by Yoshirō Taniguchi and Isamu Noguchi, it was begun in 1946 to replace an 1887 building destroyed by American B-29 bombers in 1944 during the Pacific War. The Shin banraisha (新萬來舎, new Banraisha) was completed in 1951. In 2005, it (and its garden) was moved to the roof of the South Building.

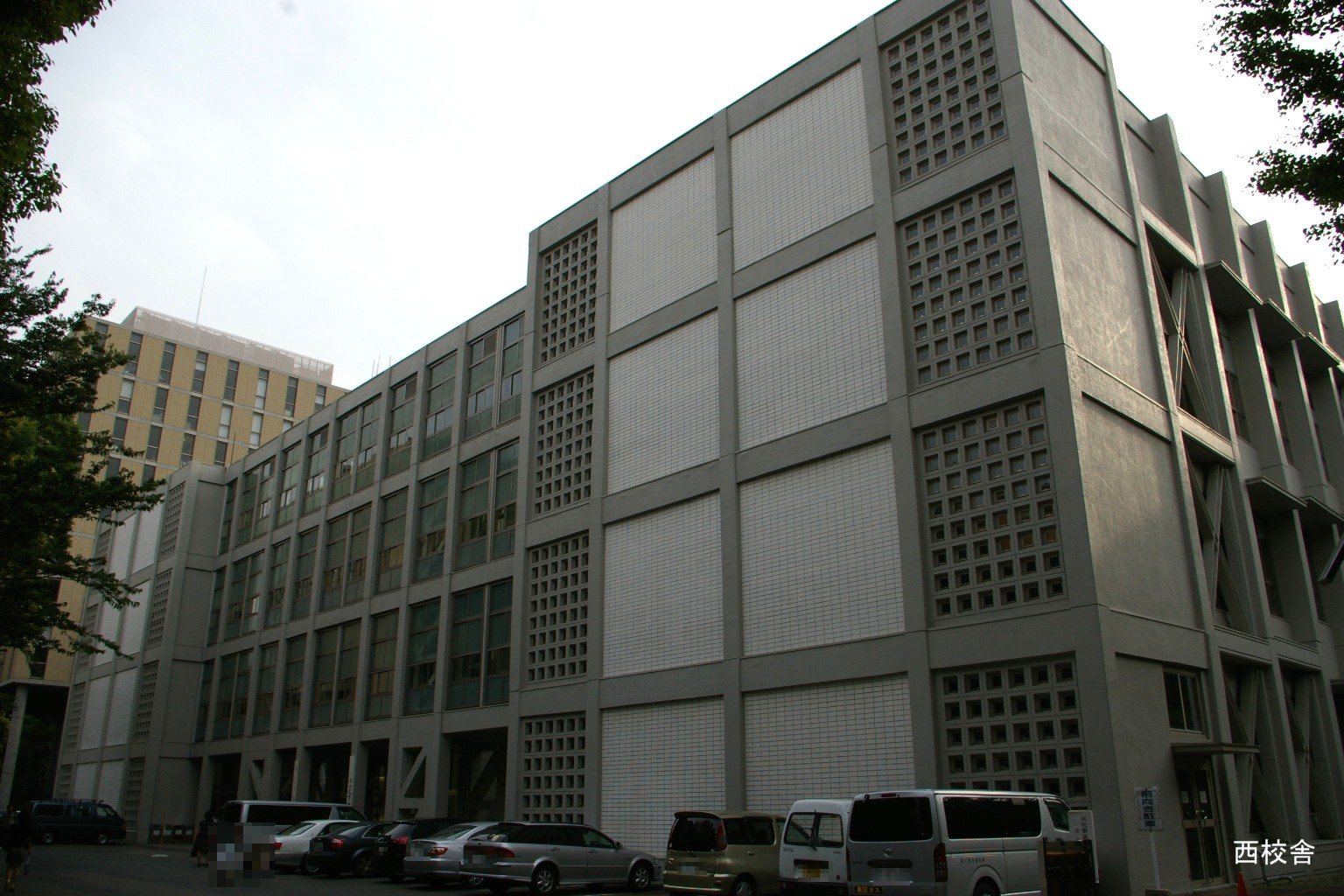
West Building

Nishi kosha (西校舎, West Building)
The West Building was constructed in 1959 (at the same time as the old Minami kōsha) as part of the university's centenary, on the site of the Dai kōdō (大講堂, main lecture hall) (which was destroyed in a 1945 aerial attack).

Graduate-school building
The graduate-school building was constructed as part of the university's 125th anniversary. It houses classrooms, research rooms and offices.

Other buildings include:

- Nishi-kan (西館, East Building): Keio University Athletic Association and Mita Bungaku offices, internal audit services
- Kita-kan (北館, North Building): Conference hall, health center and offices
- Daiichi Kōsha (第一校舎, Building One): Classrooms and offices
- Kenkyu-shitsu tō (研究室棟, Faculty Research Building): Offices, meeting and research rooms
- Keio University Press: International dormitory

== Hiyoshi campus ==
The Hiyoshi campus opened in 1934. During World War II, some buildings were used by the Imperial Navy of Japan's (大日本帝國海軍, Dainihon teikoku kaigun) third region of naval operations (軍令部3部, Gunrei-bu san-bu) personnel division, engineering unit, headquarters of its combined squadron (連合艦隊司令, Rengō Kantai shirei-bu), naval command (海軍総隊司令部, Kaigun sōtai shirei-bu) and carrier air-wing command (航空本部, Kōkū honbu). Soon after its relocation the navy constructed a dugout, which remains. The campus still contains some undeveloped areas. Its main road, 22 metres (72 ft) wide and 220 metres (720 ft) long (from Hiyoshi station to the Commemorative Hall, lined with 100 ginkgo trees), is a popular walking area. The tree-lined street received Dai anaka-kai Yokohama-shi Machinami Keikan-shō (第7回横浜市まちなみ景観賞, the seventh Yokohama Best Regional Landscape Award) in 1997.

Notable buildings include:

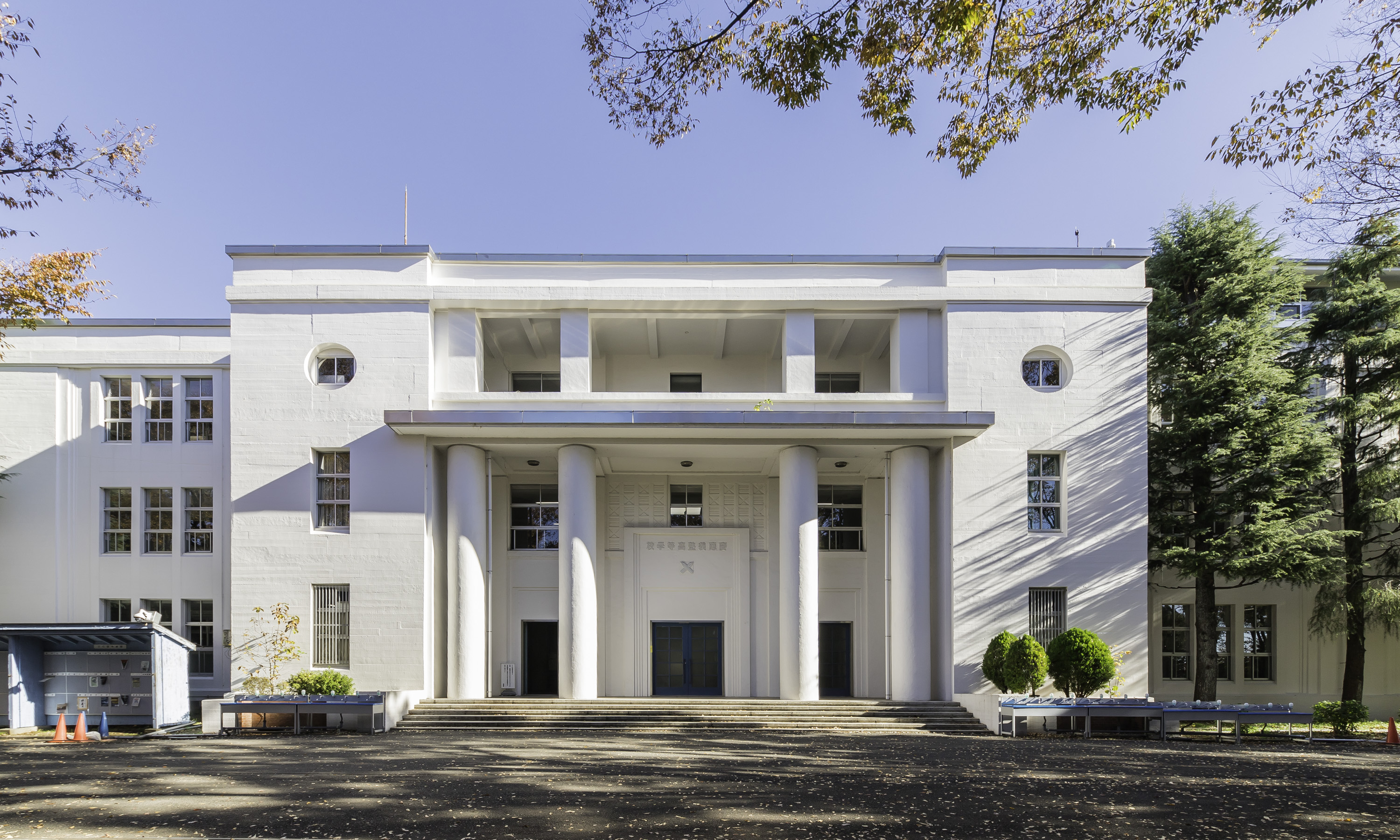
Building One

- Building One: Keio Senior High School building
- Building Two: The art-deco science-classroom building was designed by the Sone Chujyo architectural office (曾禰中條建築事務所, Sone-Chujyo-kentiku jimusho) and built by the Johen partnership (上遠合名会社, Jōen gōmei gaisha) and Shimizu gumi in 1934.

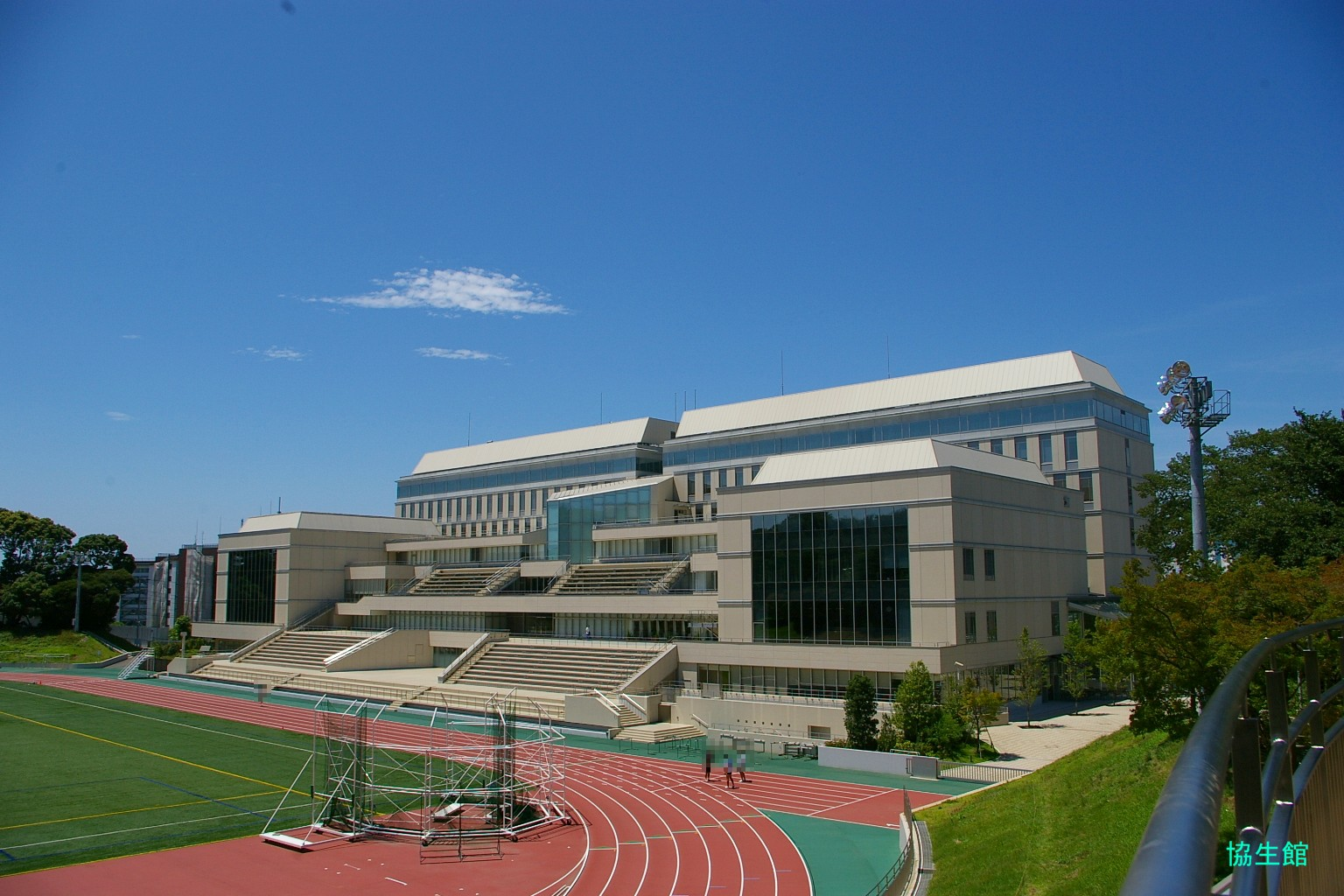
Kyōsei-kan (from athletics stadium)

- Kyosei-kan (協生館): Built in 2008 as part of the university's 150th-anniversary celebrations, its architecture is highly ranked by CASBEE Yokohama (横浜) (the Yokohama certification system for environmental friendliness). The complex features a pool, the graduate school and facilities available to the public.
- Raiōsha (来往舎): Designed and constructed by Shimizu Group in 2001, the seven-story building contains laboratories and reference libraries.

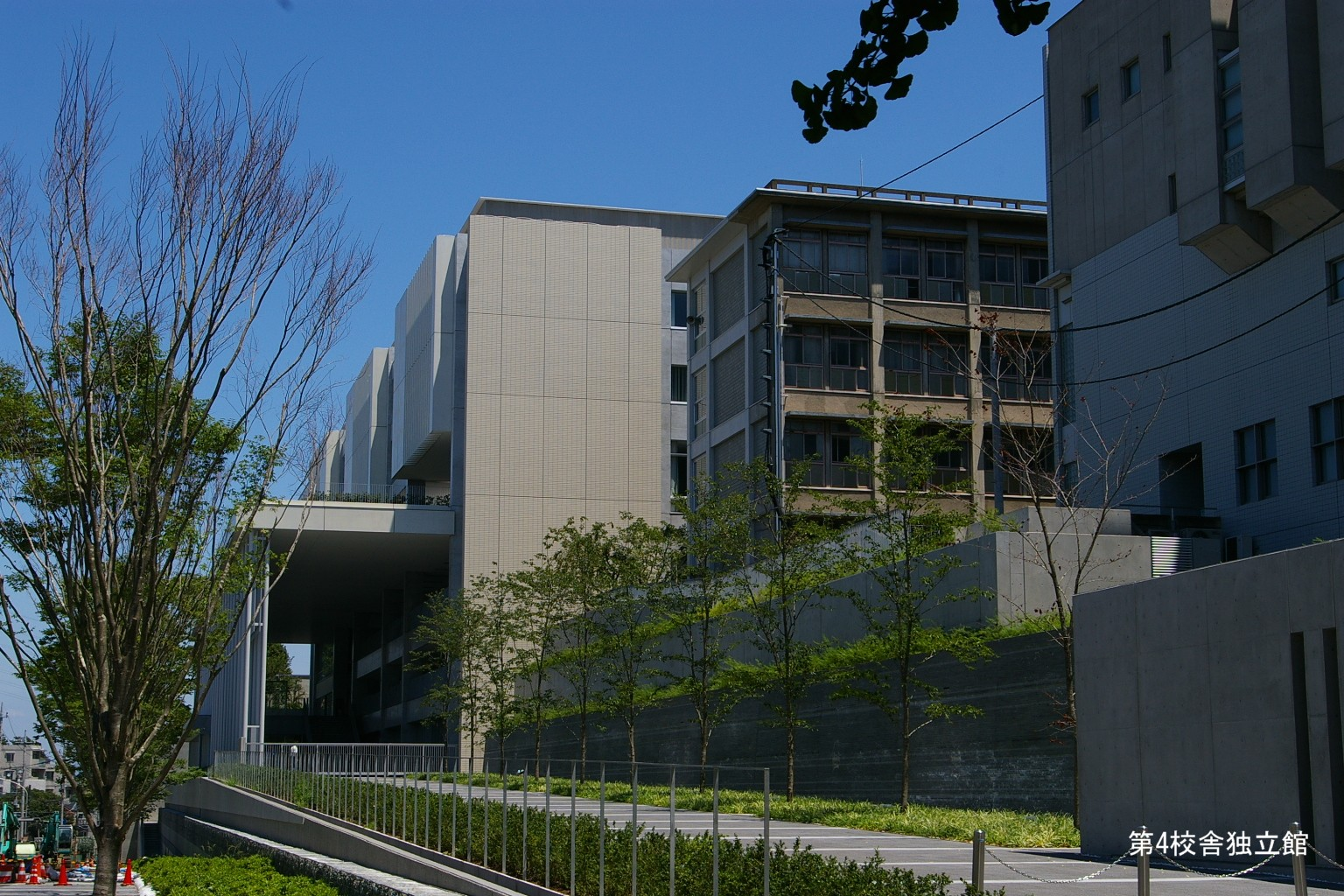
Cherry-blossom trees on Tsunashima Way

- Building Four (Independence Wing): Built in 2009 as part of the university's 150th-anniversary celebration by Kajima Group, the building features a communications studio.

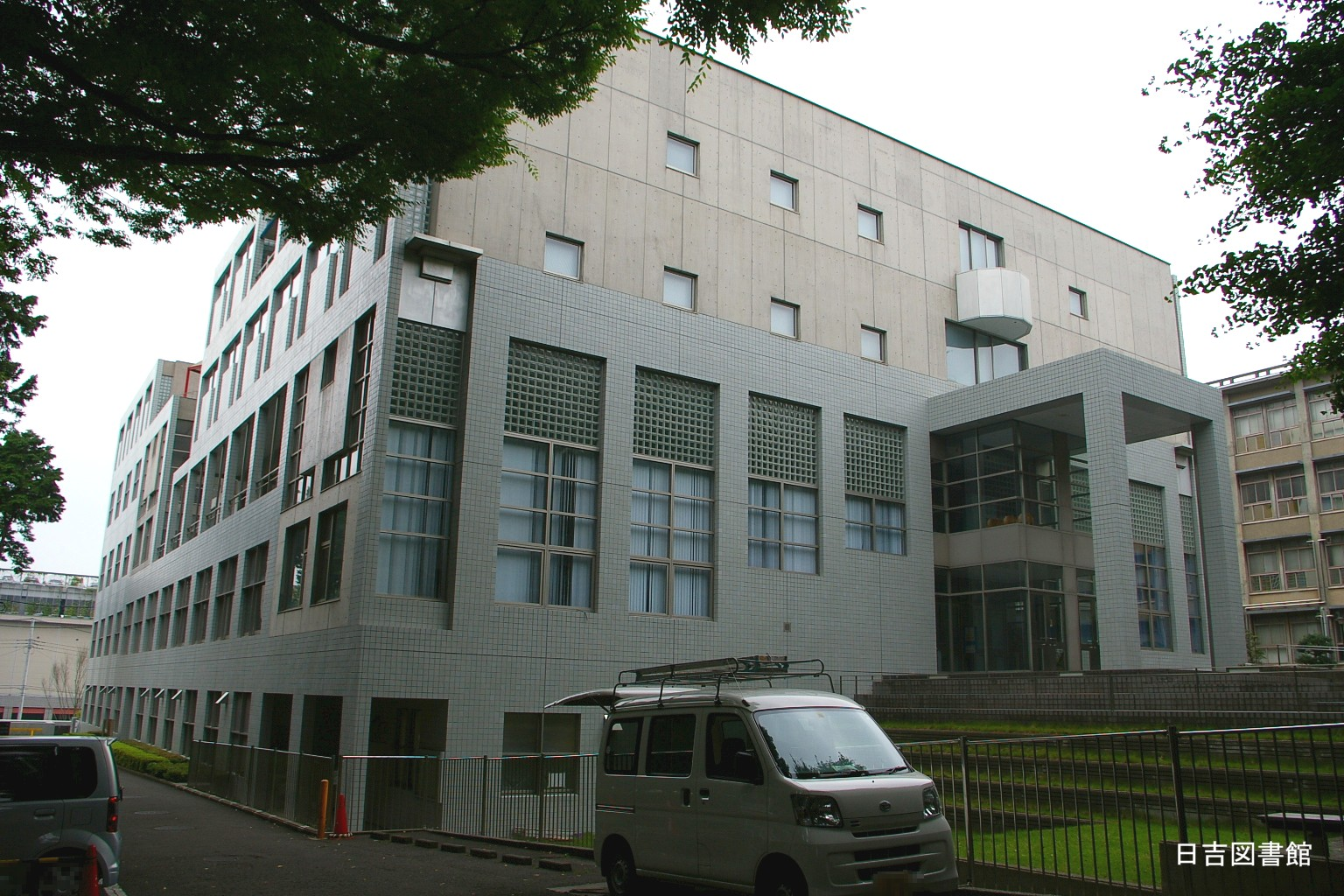
Hiyoshi Library

- Hiyoshi Library: Built with a ship motif in 1985, the library has 600,000 titles.

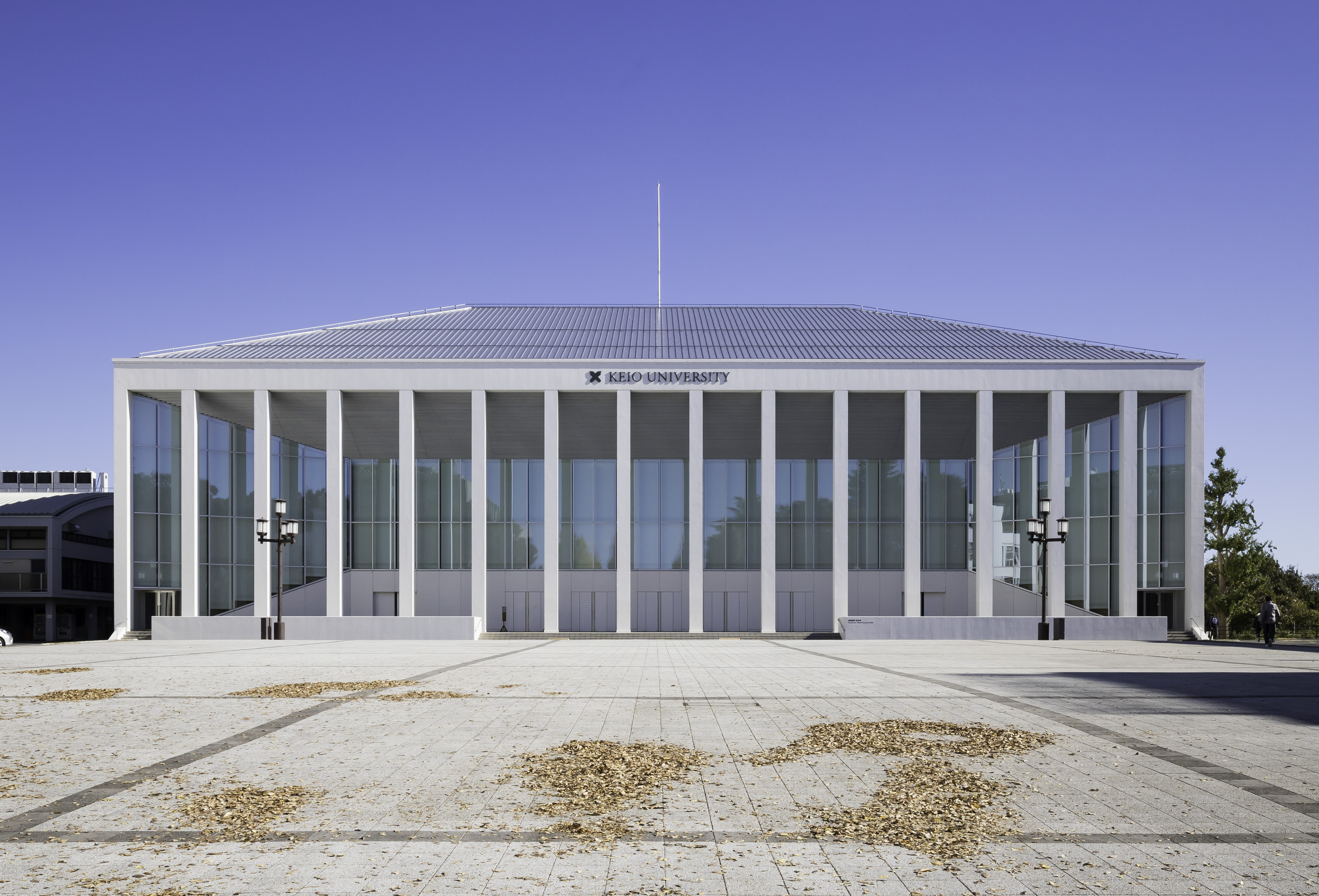
Hiyoshi Commemorative Hall

- Hiyoshi Commemorative Hall (記念館, Kinen kan): Built for the university's 100th anniversary in 1958, the hall's restructuring plans have been postponed.

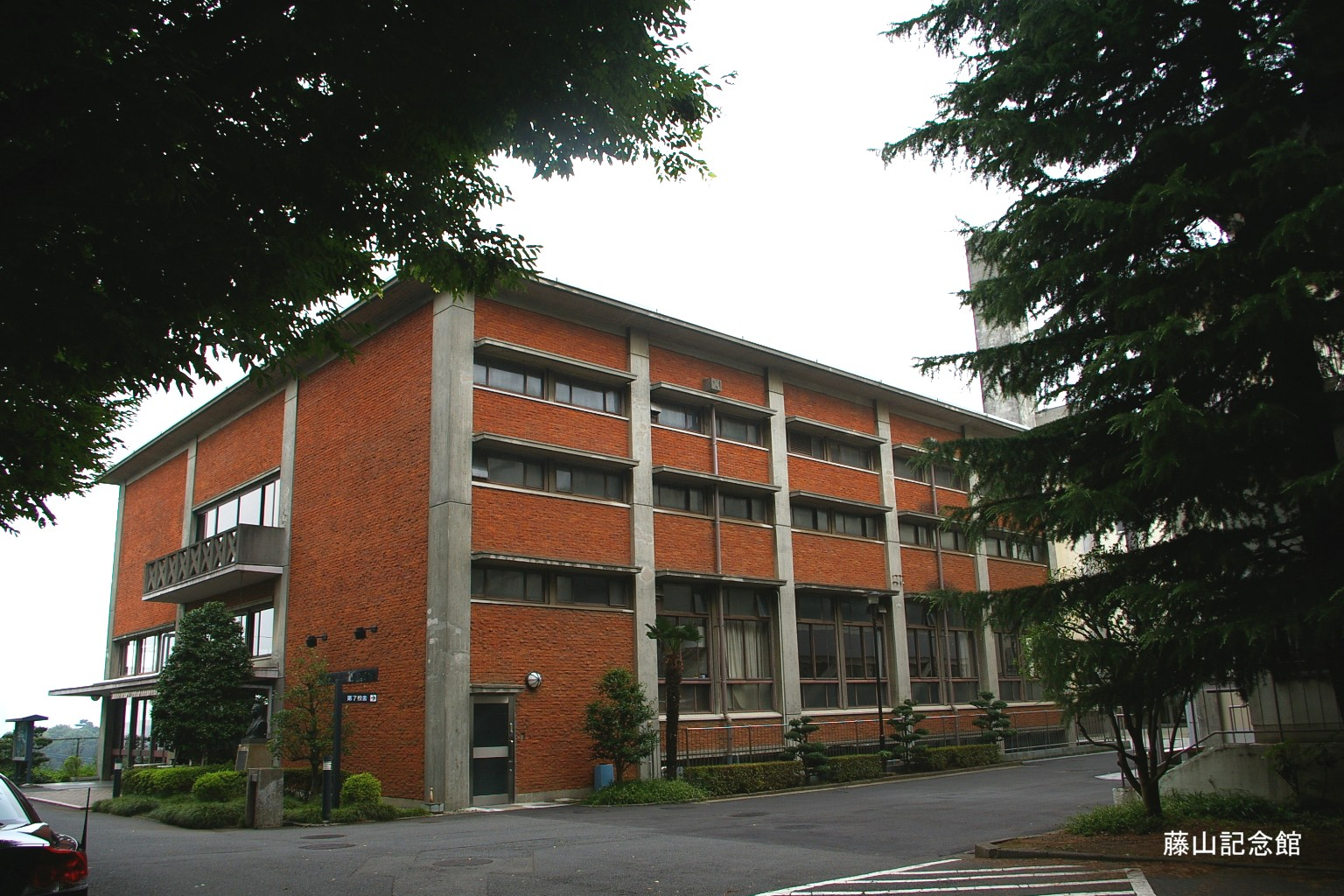
Fujiwara Memorial Hall

- Fujiwara Memorial Hall: Built in 1958 as a library with a donation from Aiichirō Fujiwara, it is now a multipurpose building.
- KBS: Opened in 1978, the former graduate school is vacant.
- Building Three: Classrooms, foreign-language lounge
- Building Four: Section A—classrooms; Section B—classrooms, counseling room, international and business centers
- Building Five: Built in 1962, the four-story building was demolished and replaced by a garden.
- Building Six: Classrooms, terrace
- Building Seven: Classrooms, lecture room, Hiyoshi information-technology center, computer room
- Building Eight: Classrooms, Psychology laboratory, art research room, musicology research department

=== Indoor fitness facilities ===
- Gymnasium: Judo and Kendo training rooms
- Sport ridge: Research laboratory, ping-pong training room
- Judo training room
- Sports medicine research center

=== Outdoor athletic plant ===
- Rugby field (birthplace of Japanese rugby)
- Equestrian facility

=== Public-health facility ===
- Health-management center
- Extracurricular-activity center
- Commons: Restaurants, assembly room, store

=== Accommodations ===
- Hiyoshi dormitory (日吉寄宿舎, Hiyoshi kishukusha): Designed by Yoshirō Taniguchi (1937)
- Shimoda Student Village (下田学生寮, Shimoda gakusei ryō): Four stories
- Baseball-club hostel (2008)
- KBS house
- Keio Nestle House

=== Other facilities ===
- Dugout entrance
- Yayoi period residence, with burial chamber
- Young Buddhists Association (佛教青年会館, Bukkyo seinen kaikan)
- YMCA chapel (1936)

== Shinanomachi campus ==
In 1917 a medical school (医学科予科, Igaku-ka yoka) opened in Mita, later moving to Shinanomachi and (during World War II) Musashino. Notable buildings include:

- New Building (新棟, Shin-tō): Built in 1987, the 11-story hospital has 1,056 beds.

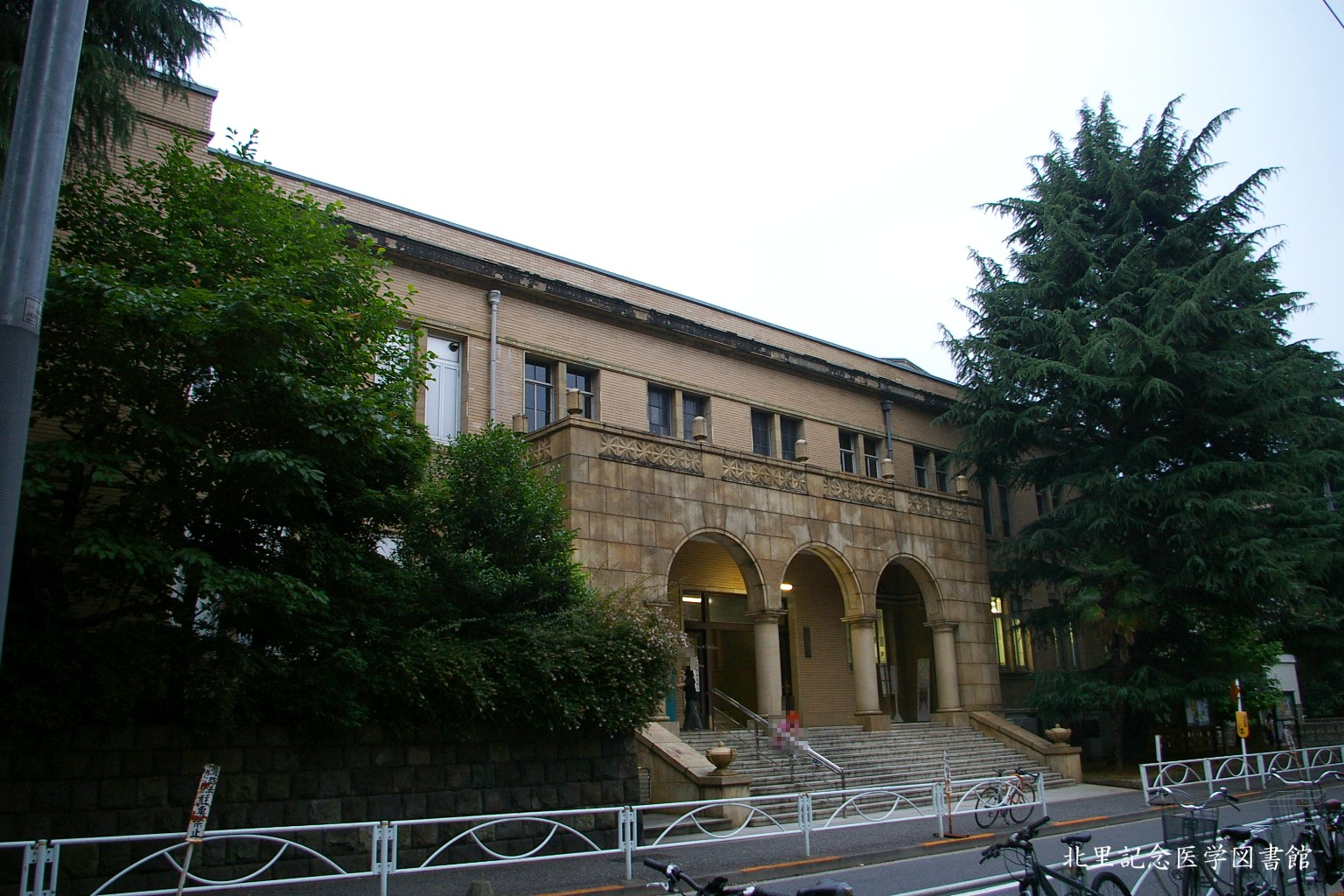
Kitasato Memorial Medical Library

- Kitasato Memorial Medical Library: In 1937, the Dr. Kitasato Memorial Library Commission (北里博士記念医学図書館建設会, Kitasato hakushi kinen igaku tosho-kan kensetsu-kai) unveiled plans for a library in memory of the medical school's founder, Shibasaburo Kitazato. Three hundred thousand yen was raised, and 和田順顕 (Junkei Wada) was commissioned to design the building. In 1944 the commission donated the building to the university, and in 2004 it was renamed the Shinanomachi Media Center. It has a large number of books, specializing in medical history. The Kitasato Prize (北里講堂, Kitasato kodo) is awarded annually.

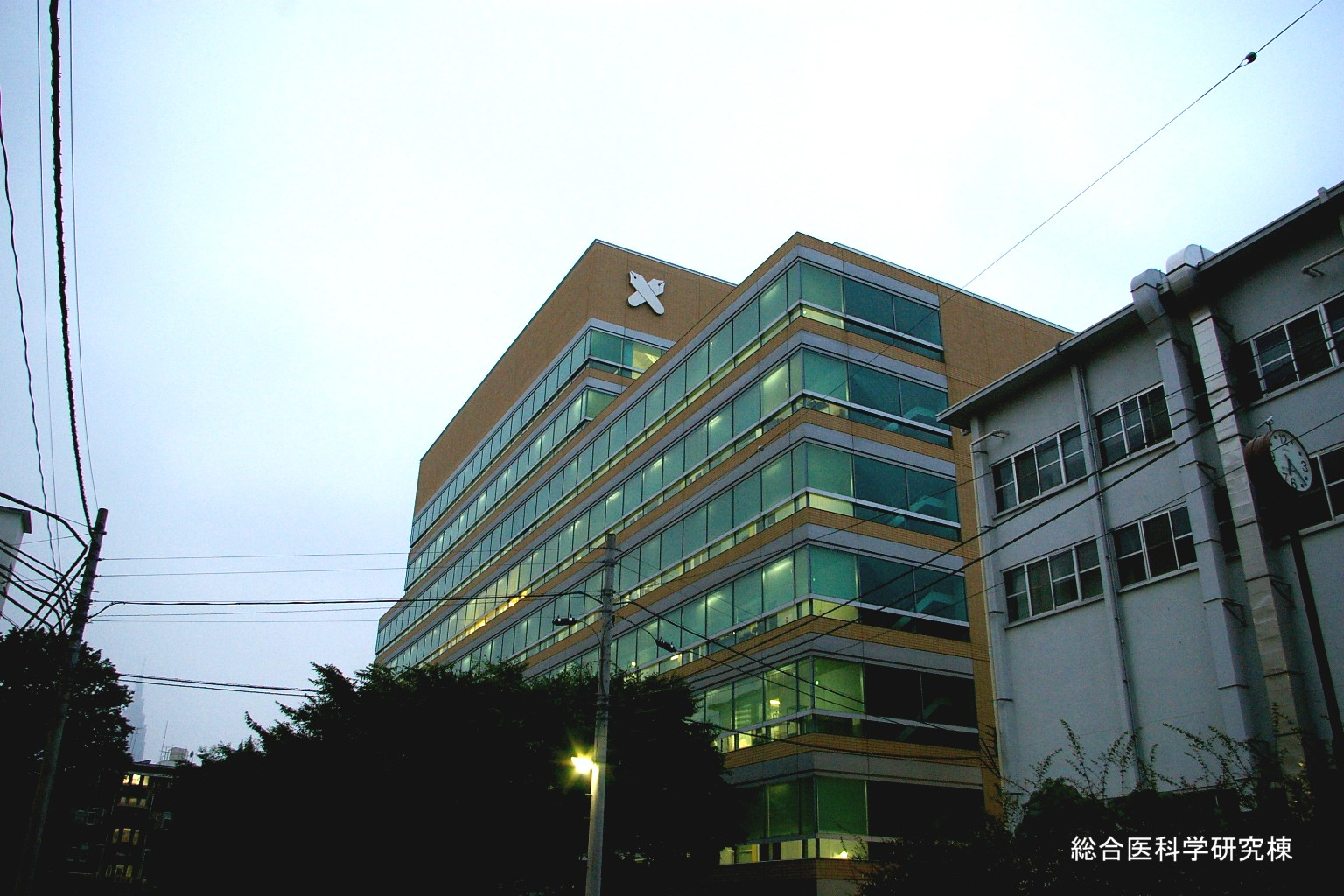
Institute of Integrated Medical Research

- Institute of Integrated Medical Research: The nine-story building was constructed in 2001.

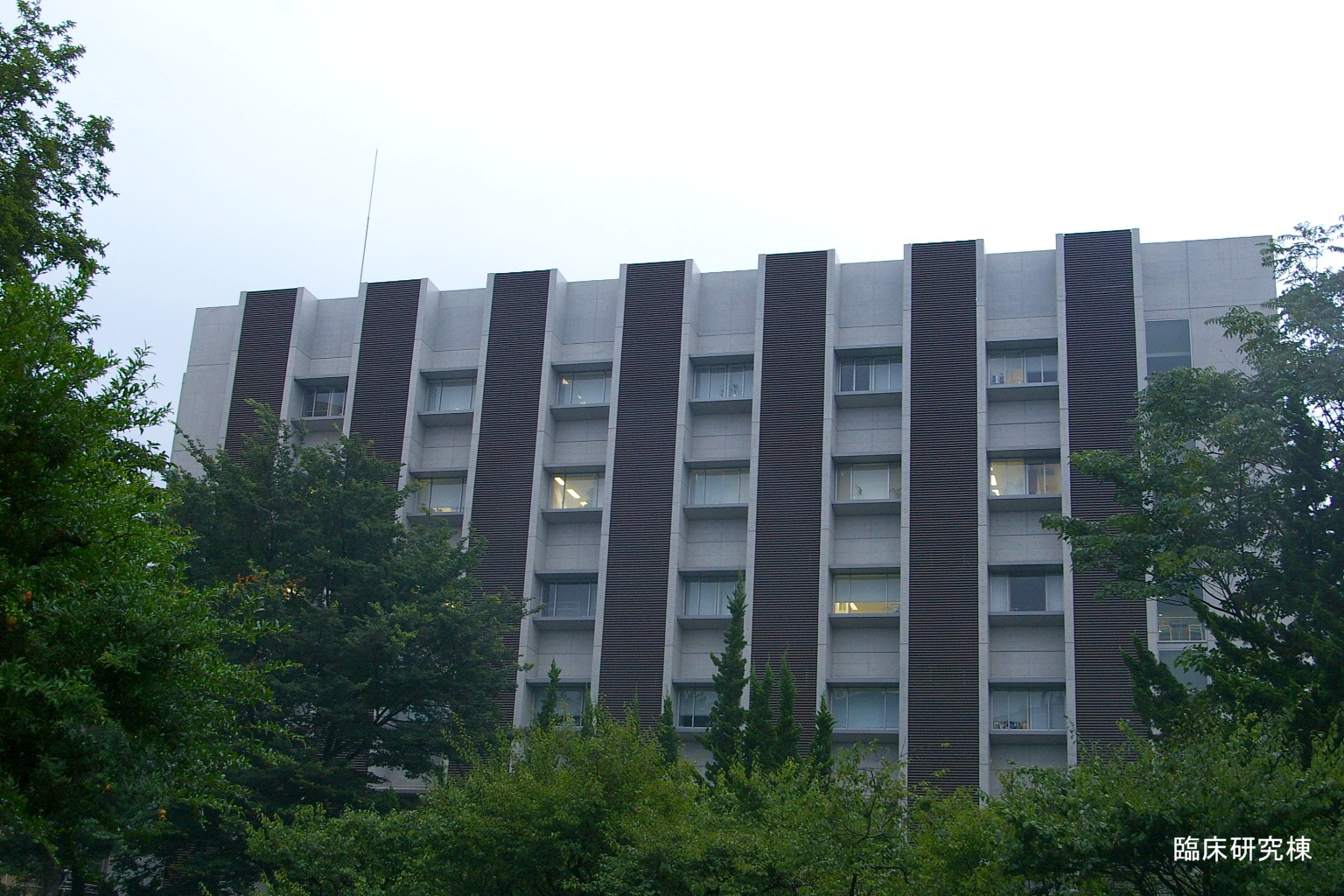
Building for Clinical Research

- Clinical Research Building: The five-story building was constructed in February 2008.

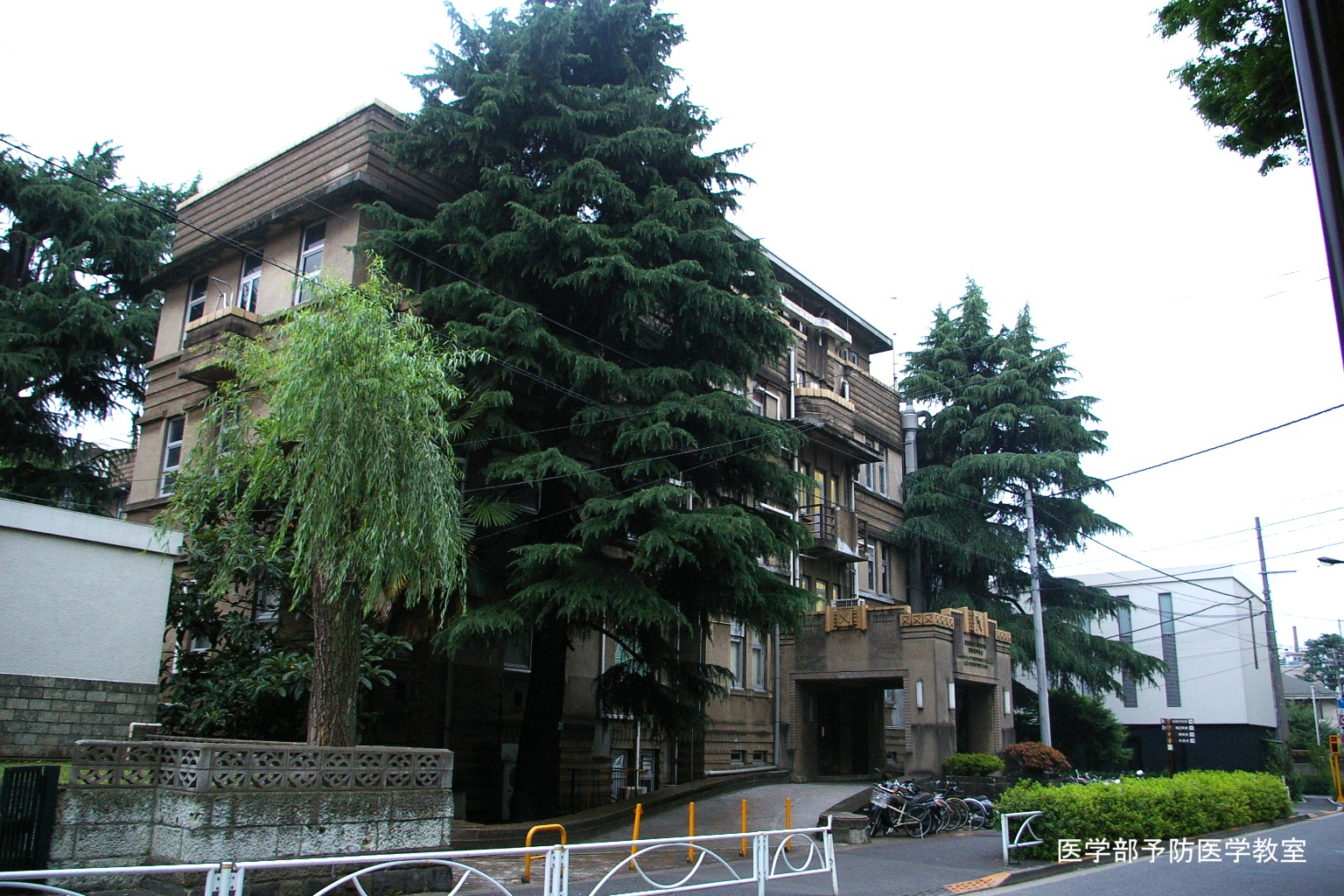
Preventive Medicine and Public Health Building

- Preventive Medicine and Public Health Building: Built in 1929, the four-story building (designed by 曾禰中條建築事務所 (Sonenaka-jyo kenchiku jimusho) and built by 清水組 (Shimizu-gumi)) is the oldest on the Shinanomachi campus and until recently was used for lectures.
- Hospital annex: The annex was designed by Sone-naka-jyo kenchiku jimusho and constructed by 大林組 (Ōbayashi gumi) in 1932. In 2008, it ended its operations; in November 2009, a ceremony to appease the earth･god (地鎮祭, Jichin sai) was held before the construction of Building 3.
- Building 3: The six-story building has two wings: North (Clinical Research Building II) and South.

=== Clinic ===
- Central wing (1963)
- Wing 1 wards: Two outpatient wards (1965)
- Wing 2 wards: Clinical research wing (department of internal medicine)
- Wing 6 wards (1953)
- Wing 7 wards (1954)
- Outpatient rehabilitation center
- Endocrine center
- Advanced care center
- Radiographic diagnostic center
- Mortuary

=== Education and research ===
- East lecture hall (1957)
- Lecture Hall 2 (1961)
- Education and Research Building (1996): Lecture hall and seminar room
- Clinical Research Hall: Lecture theater
- Waksman Foundation of Japan (1957): Founded by 1952 Nobel laureate Selman Abraham Waksman for the Kitasato Saburo seitan Hyakunenn sai (北里柴三郎生誕百年祭, centennial celebration for Saburo Kisatato).
- Kōyō-sha (孝養舎, Agape House): Nursing-school lecture room, general-education center, gym
- Museum
- Animal housing
- Boiler room

=== Other buildings ===
- Brick Building (煉瓦館, Renga kan): The present commercial facility was built in 1995 on the site of the Human Diet Research Institute (食養研究所, Shokuyō kenkyu-jo).
- 慶應稲荷大明神 (Keio Inari daimyo-jin): The Shinto shrine is located on campus.

== Yagami campus ==
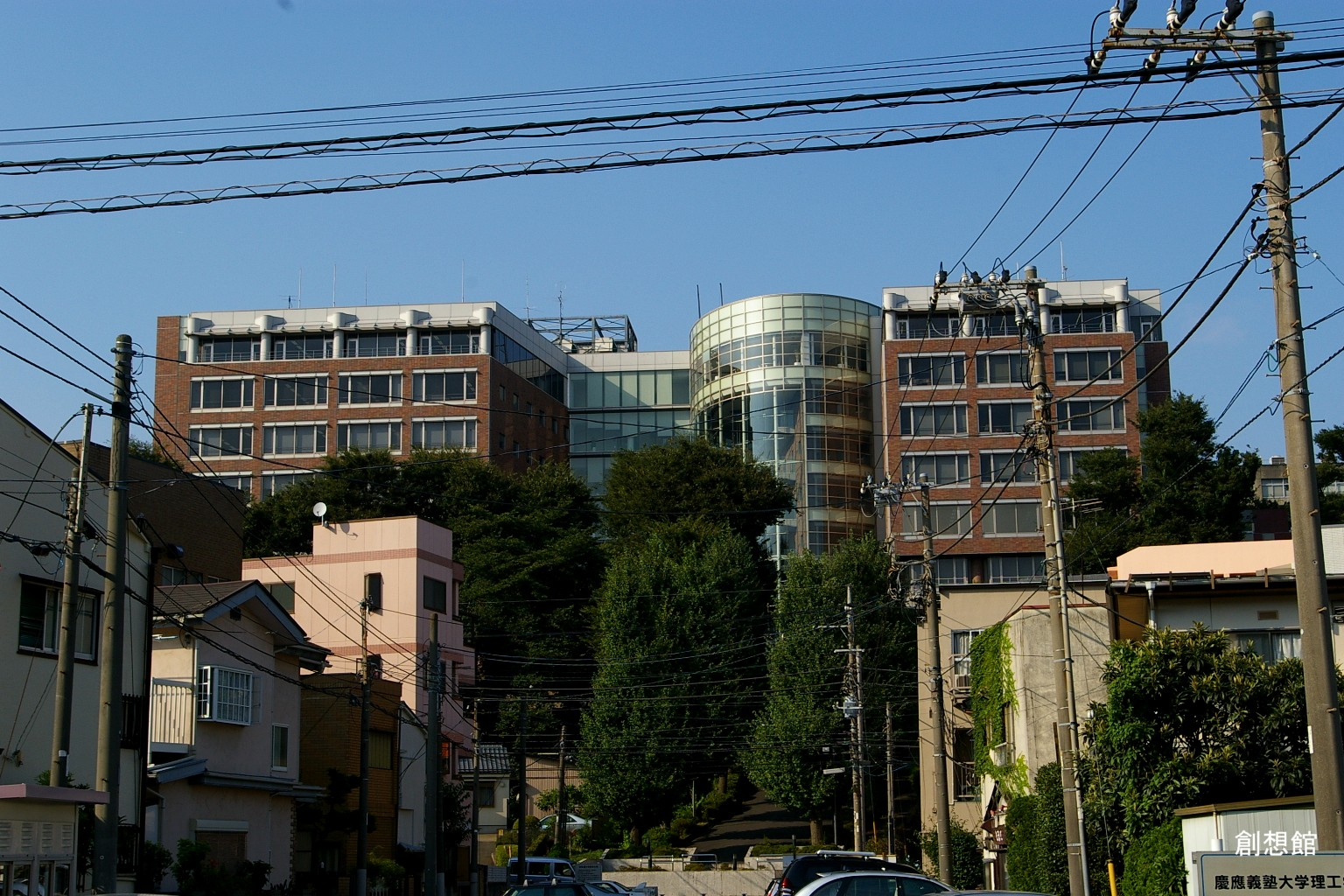
Sōsō kan

- 創想館 (Sōsō kan): Built in 2000, the building has a basement reference room.

== Shiba kyoritsu campus ==
In 2008 Keio University joined 共立薬科大学 (Kyoritsu Yakka daigaku) with campuses in Shiba and Urawa, opening its Department of Pharmacology and the Graduate School of Pharmaceutical Sciences. The campus has three buildings: 1, 2 and 3.

== Shin-kawasaki campus ==
The K^{2}Town campus, built in 2000, aims to advance research and development among industry, academia and Kawasaki.
