= Keio Girls Senior High School =

Private high school in Minato, Tokyo, Japan

Coordinates: 35.6482°N 139.7401°E

- 慶應義塾女子高等学校
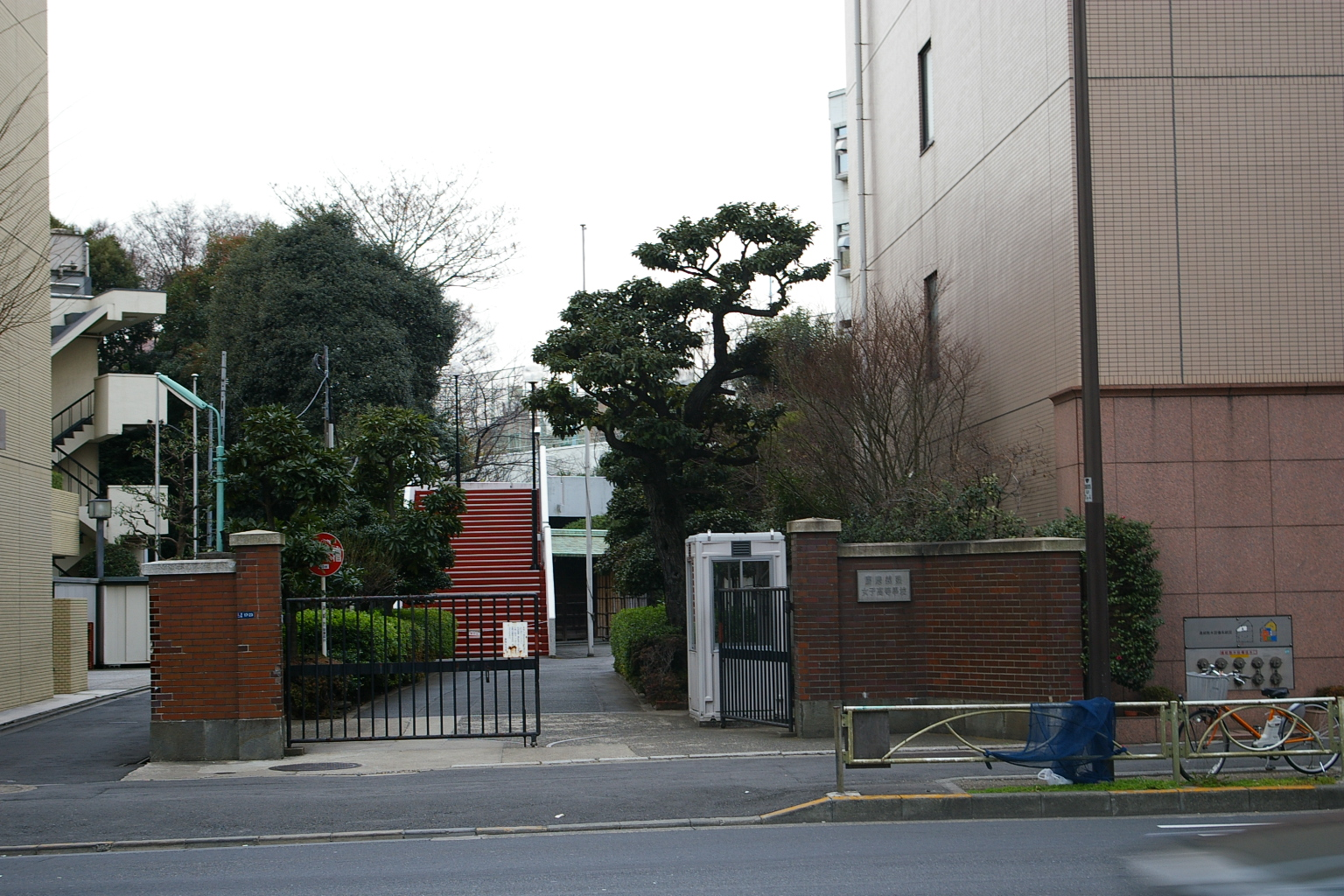
- The school in 2009
- Tokyo; Japan

Information
- Established: 1950; 76 years ago
- Affiliation: Keio University
- Website: www.gshs.keio.ac.jp/en/index.html

Keio Girls Senior High School (慶應義塾女子高等学校, Keiō Gijuku Joshi Kōtō Gakkō) is a senior high school for girls in Mita, Minato, Tokyo.

== Overview ==
Affiliated with Keio University, it is on the grounds of a previous residence of Tokugawa Ieyasu. An annex facility was constructed in 2014.

== Notable alumnae ==
- Chiaki Mukai, Astronaut
- Kiyoko Okabe, Supreme Court Justice
- Yasuko Komiyama, Politician
- Ayuko Kato, Politician
- Kazuyo Katsuma, Businesswoman
- Mariko Asabuki, Writer
- Ayaka Hironaka, TV Asahi Announcer
- Emi Ikehata, Actress
- Misako Konno, Actress
- Yuki Shibamoto, Actress
- Karin Miyawaki, Fencer
- Mana Ashida, Actress

== See also ==
- Keio University
