= Japan Association of Corporate Executives =

- 経済同友会
- Formation: April 30, 1946; 80 years ago
- Founder: Kohei Gōi (郷司浩平), Kei Hoashi (帆足計), et al.
- Type: professional association
- Legal status: Private, non-profit
- Purpose: Contribute to the development and revitalization of the Japanese economy
- Headquarters: Tokyo
- Location: 2-5-1 Chiyoda, Marunouchi, Tokyo, Japan
- Region served: Japan
- Official language: Japanese
- Key people: Yoshimitsu Kobayashi (小林喜光, Chairman, 2015-)
- Website: www.doyukai.or.jp/en/

The Japan Association of Corporate Executives (経済同友会, Keizai Dōyukai) is a Japanese professional association of independent leading executives. Founded in 1948, the group engages in advocacy on public policy issues related to the development of the Japanese economy in both a domestic and global context. The association is commonly referred to as "Keizai Dōyukai".

Keizai Dōyukai conducts in-depth policy studies, publishes position papers, and holds regular meetings and seminars on issues relating to the development of the Japanese economy. The association seeks to engage with political parties, government officials, labour organizations and other economic stakeholders.

For most of the post-war period, Keizai Dōyukai has promoted a more progressive, innovative and market based economic approach to business issues in contrast to the position of country's other main corporate sponsored business associations; Keidanren and the Japan Chamber of Commerce and Industry (日本商工会議所).

== Membership ==
Membership of Keizai Dōyukai is by invitation and is held in an individual capacity independent of corporate affiliation. Its approximately 1,400 members consists of senior executives of 950 Japanese corporations sharing a common belief that corporate managers should be key players in a broad range of political, economic and social issues.

Membership was first extended to women executives in 1986.

== Corporate social responsibility ==
Keizai Dōyukai has a record of advocating that corporate social responsibility be an integral part of responsible business activities, not simply as an issue of legal compliance or discrete charitable giving.

== Current Board ==
Yoshimitsu Kobayashi Chairman of Mitsubishi Chemical Holdings assumed the role of Keizai Dōyukai Chairman in 2015.

== See also ==
- Chamber of commerce
- List of employer associations
