= Keio University =

Private university in Minato, Tokyo, Japan

- 慶應義塾大学
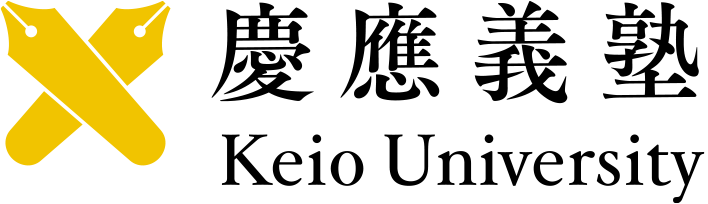
- Motto: ペンは剣よりも強し; Calamus Gladio Fortior
- Motto in English: 'The pen is mightier than the sword'
- Type: Private; research university
- Established: 23 April 1858; 168 years ago
- Founder: Fukuzawa Yukichi
- Affiliations: AACSB, APRU, CEMS – The Global Alliance in Management Education, COBS, ASAIHL
- President: Kohei Itoh
- Faculty: 2,791 full-time (As of May 1, 2022)
- Administrative staff: 3,252 full-time (As of May 1, 2022)
- Students: 33,437 (As of May 1, 2022)
- Undergraduates: 28,641 (As of May 1, 2022)
- Postgraduates: 6,222 (As of May 1, 2022)
- Location: Minato, Tokyo, Japan; 35°38′57″N 139°44′34″E
- Campus: Urban
- Flag
- Colors: Gold, Navy Blue, and Red
- Mascot: Keio Unicorn
- Athletics: 43 Varsity Teams
- Website: keio.ac.jp

Japanese name
- Kanji: 慶應義塾大学
- Hiragana: けいおうぎじゅくだいがく
Transcriptions
- Romanization: Keiōgijuku Daigaku

Keio University (Japanese: 慶應義塾大学, Hepburn: Keiō Gijuku Daigaku), abbreviated as Keio (慶應) or Keidai (慶大), is a private research university located in Minato, Tokyo, Japan. It was originally established as a school for Western studies in 1858 in Edo. It was granted university status in 1920, becoming one of the first private universities in the country.

Keio University is also one of the member universities of RU11 and APRU, and it is one of two Japanese universities (alongside the University of Tokyo) to be a member of the World Economic Forum's Global University Leaders Forum.

== Overview ==
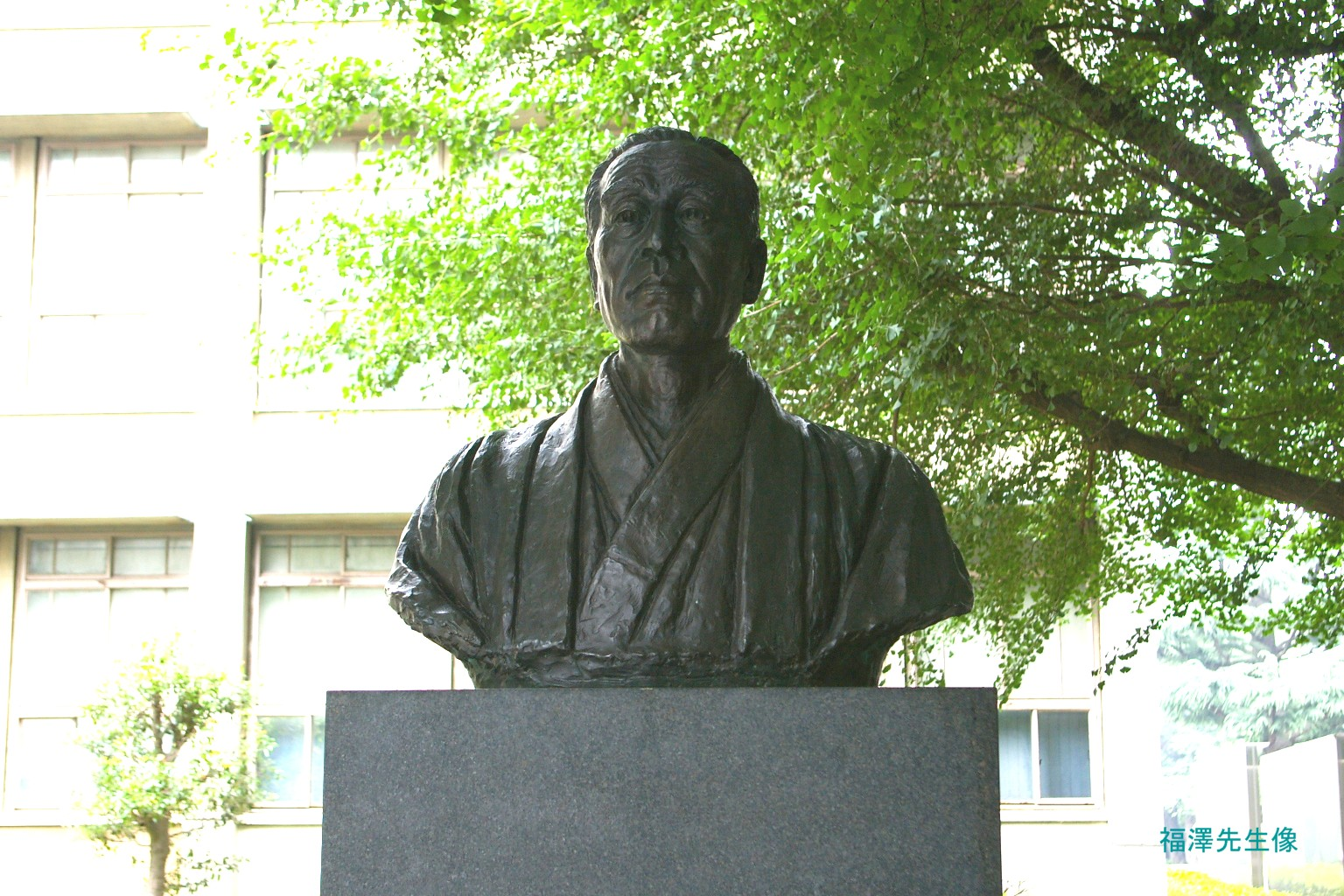
The founder of Keio Fukuzawa Yukichi's statue on Hiyoshi campus.

Keio traces its history to 1858 when Fukuzawa Yukichi started to teach Dutch while he was a guest of the Okudaira family. In 1868 he changed the name of the school to Keio Gijuku and devoted his time to education. While Keio's initial identity was that of a private school of Western studies, it expanded and established its first university faculty in 1890.

Keio has approximately 30 Research Centres located on its five main campuses and at other facilities for advanced research in Japan. Keio University Research Institute at SFC (KRIS) has joined the MIT and the French INRIA in hosting the international W3C.

== History ==
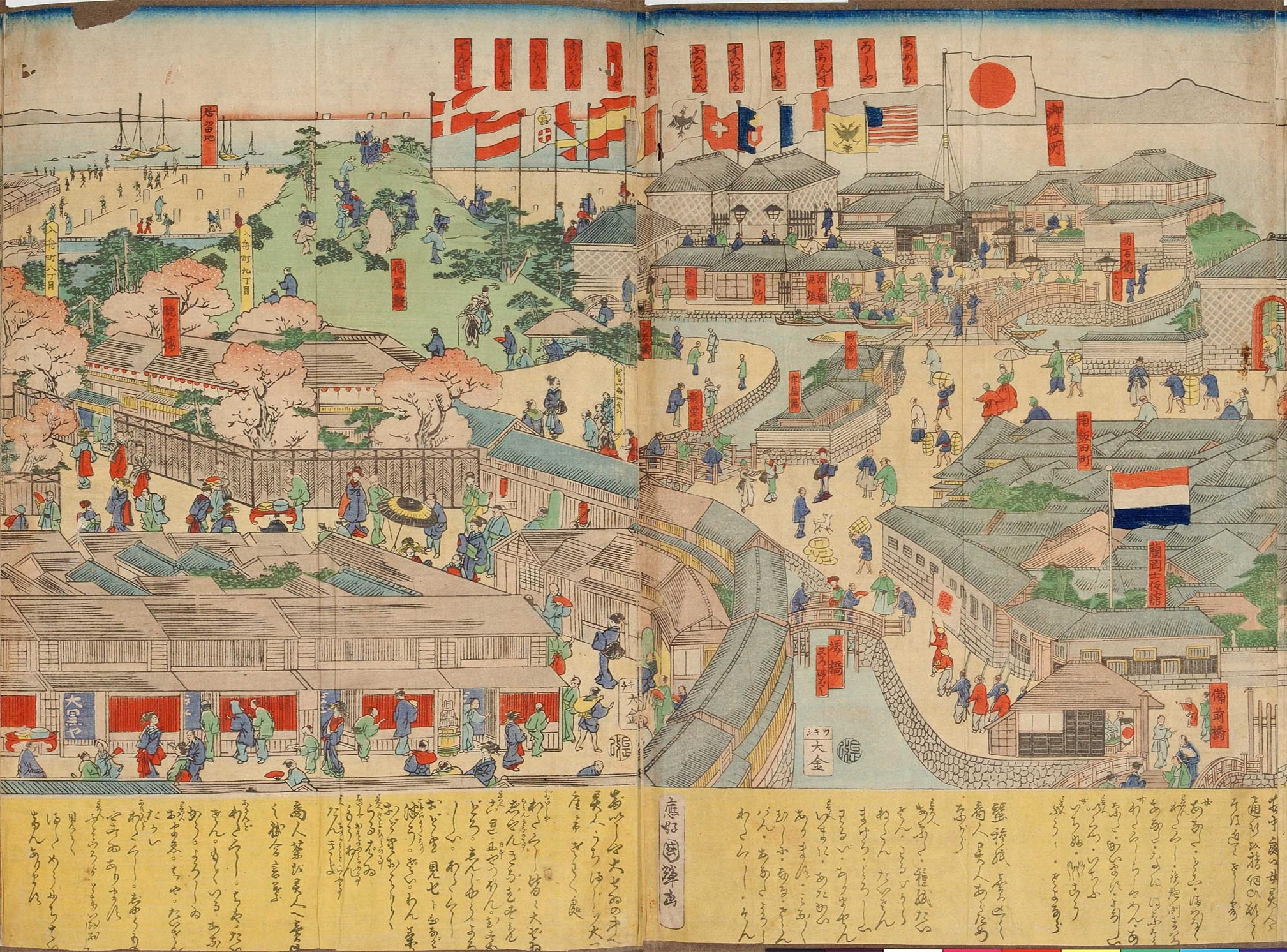
Keio Gijuku in Tsukiji in 1869

Keio University (慶應義塾大学, Keiō Gijuku Daigaku) was first established in 1858 as a School of Western studies located in one of the mansion houses at Tsukiji by founder Fukuzawa Yukichi. "Shinshu Kan" was the original name of Keio University. Keio University's root is considered to be the Han school for Kokugaku studies, named Shinshu Kan established in 1796. It later changed its name to "Keio Gijuku" in 1868, which originated from the era name "Keio", with "Gijuku" as the translation of Private school. It moved to its current location in 1871, established a Medical school in 1873, along with the university department of Economics, Law and Literacy studies in 1890.

Year	University Development
1858	Establishment a school for Dutch studies
1863	Switched its focus to English studies
1868	Renamed to Keio Gijuku
1871	Moved to Mita
1879	Keio sought financial support from the government but failed. Instead, it became a vocational school funded by daimyōs including Shimazu clan.
1890	Departments of Economics, Law, and Letters established
1906	Graduate studies programs established
1917	School of Medicine established
1920	Keio authorized as a university, hence gaining the authority to confer degrees
1934	Hiyoshi Campus opened
1944	School of Technology established
1949	Keio authorized as a university in the post-war system
1957	School of Business and Commerce established
1962	Graduate School of Business Administration established
1981	Department of Science and Technology established
1990	School of Environmental and Information Studies and School of Policy Management established
2001	School of Nursing and Medical Care established
2004	School of Law established
2008	School of Pharmacy established
2008	Graduate School of Media Design established
2016	Tonomachi Town Campus opened
2021	Fukuzawa Yukichi Memorial Keio History Museum established

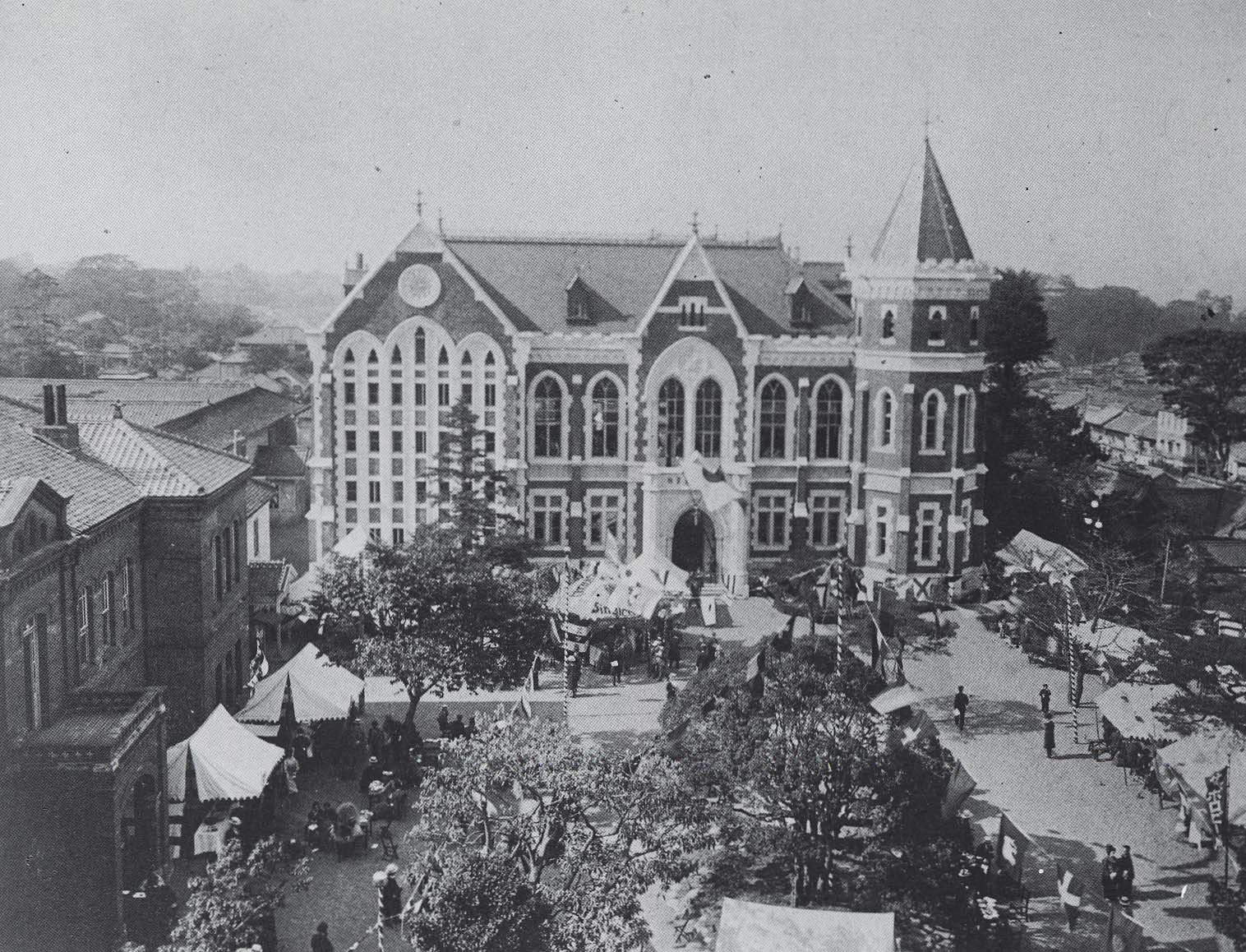
Keio University in May 1912

In 1899, Keio sent six students to study abroad. In the same year, it also accepted three international students from India, Qing-dynasty China, and Siam. Eight international students entered from Taiwan (which had technically been a territory of the Japanese Empire since 1895) the following year. In 1946, Keio University began accepting female students.

In 1916, Keio was visited by Bengali poet Rabindranath Tagore. Another visit in 1922 included physicist Albert Einstein, who presented a special lecture on the theory of relativity. In 2008, Keio University was visited by Prince Charles. In 2023, Sam Altman provided a lecture on campus.

== Presidents ==
Since the president system was established in 1881, Keio University has had 20 presidents.

List of presidents of Keio Gijuku
No.	President	Tenure
1	Sadashiro Hamano	1881–1887
2	Nobukichi Koizumi	1887–1890
3	Tokujiro Obata	1890–1897
4	Eikichi Kamata	1898–1922
5	Ichitaro Fukuzawa	1922–1923
6	Kiroku Hayashi	1923–1933
7	Shinzo Koizumi	1933–1947
8	Seiichiro Takahashi	1946–1947
9	Kouji Ushioda	1947–1956
10	Fukutaro Okui	1956–1960
11	Shohei Takamura	1960–1965
12	Kunio Nagasawa	1965–1969
13	Saku Sato	1969–1973
14	Hiroshi Kuno	1973–1977
15	Tadao Ishikawa	1977–1993
16	Yasuhiko Torii	1993–2001
17	Yuichiro Anzai	2001–2009
18	Atsushi Seike	2009–2017
19	Akira Haseyama	2017–2021
20	Kohei Itoh	2021–Present

== Student body ==
In 2021, there were 33,469 students at Keio University, with 28,667 undergraduate students and 4,802 graduate students. Although two-thirds of the student body are males, the gender ratio differs between different majors (e.g. 56% of students are female in the Faculty of Letters, whereas in the School of Medicine, three-quarters of students are men.).

Demographics of student body in 2021
	Undergraduate	Graduate (Master)	Graduate (Doctor)	Professional	Total
Total	28,667	3,034	1,408	360	33,469
Male	18,346	2,044	985	228	21,603
Female	10,321	990	423	132	11,866
International	874	861			1,735

There were 1,908 international students on May 1, 2021, with 874 undergraduate students (3.1% of total undergraduate students (=28,667)), 861 graduate students (18.0% of total graduate students (=4,802) ) and 173 other students. China provided the most international students with 1,016, followed by South Korea (436), France (66), Taiwan (51), the United States (36), Indonesia (34), and Germany (29).

== Student life ==
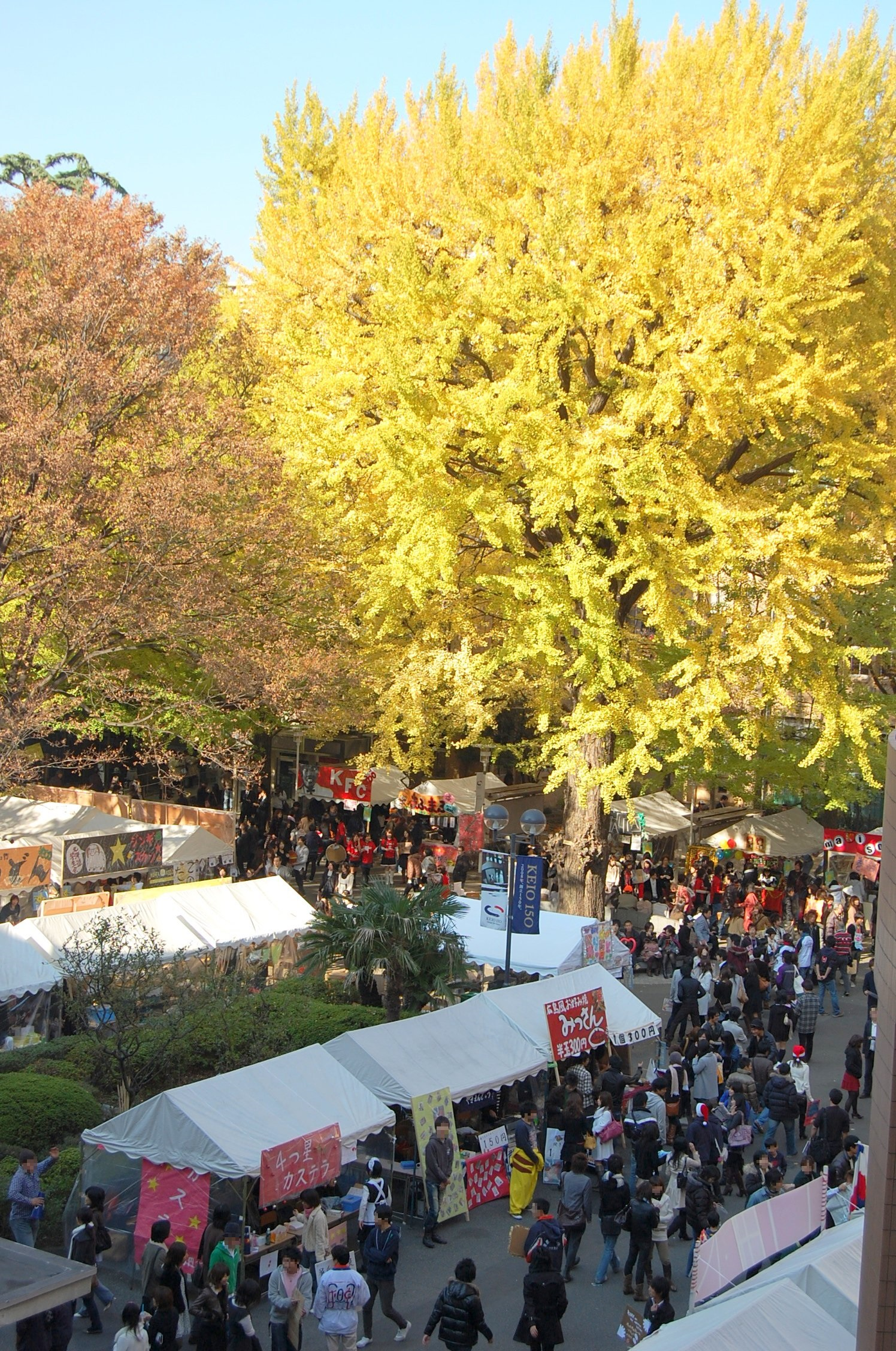
Mita Sai

=== Societies ===
In Japanese universities, student societies are known as "circles". There are over 410 circles at Keio University by estimate, including both official and unofficial circles.

=== Athletics ===
The interest of Keio's students in baseball stretches back to the early years of the 20th century. In 1913, an American touring team of players from the New York Giants and the Chicago White Sox played an exhibition game against the Keio team. In a 1932 exhibition game, the Keio team beat the University of Michigan team, which was then touring Japan. Keio's baseball team plays in the Tokyo Big6 Baseball League.

==== Kei-So rivalry ====
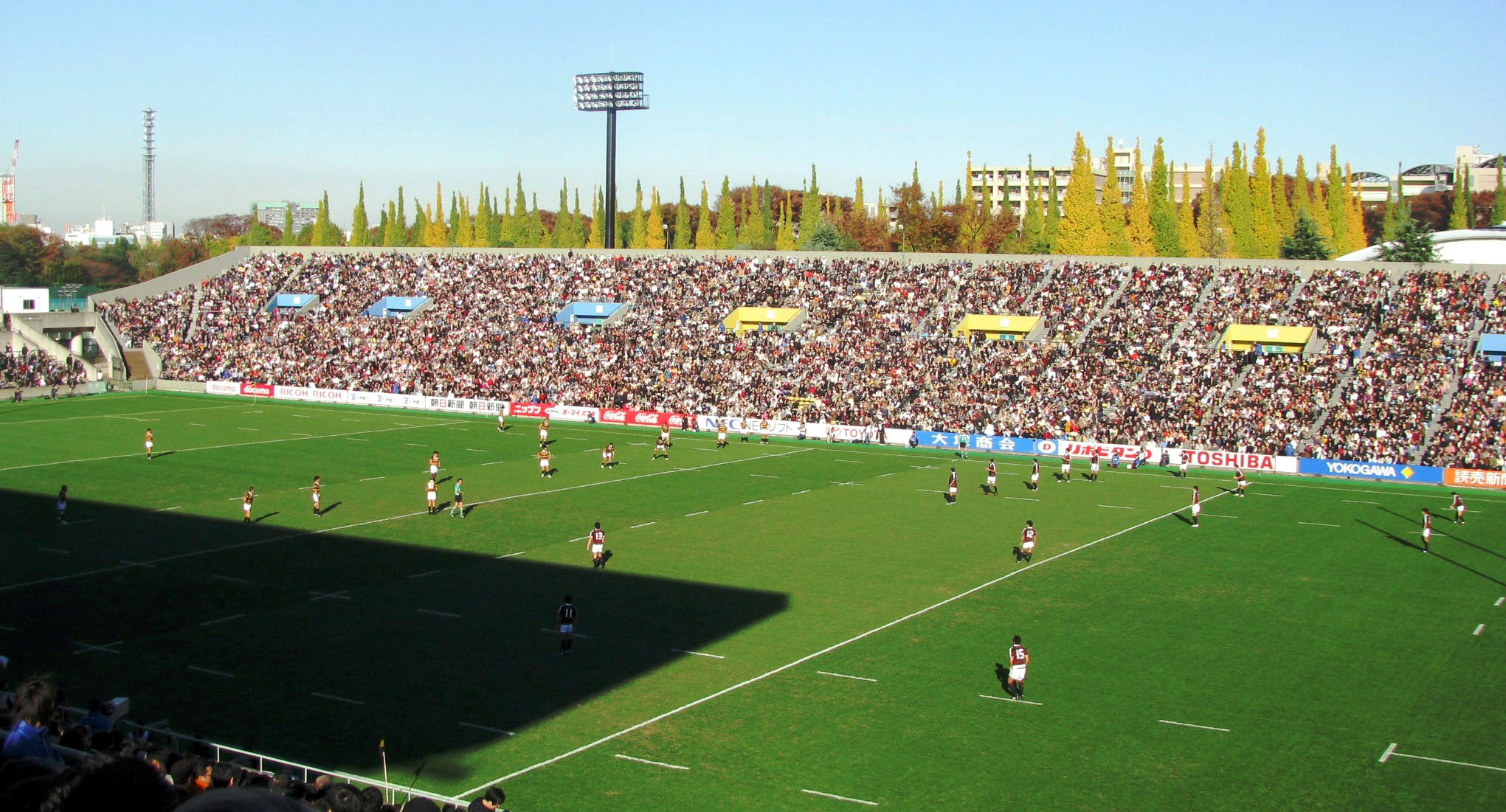
Kei-So Sen

Traditionally, there has been a strong rivalry between Keio and Waseda University. There are annually many matches between the two universities in several sports, such as baseball, rowing, rugby, lacrosse, track and field, American football, association football, aikido, karate, basketball, tennis, swimming, fencing, figure skating, ice hockey, and field hockey. These games are called "Kei–So Sen (慶早戦)" or, more generally, "So–Kei Sen (早慶戦)".

The Kei-So baseball rivalry, which has existed for over a century, holds a notable place in the history of Japanese baseball. A game played on October 16, 1943, is particularly well known and was later depicted in the 2008 film The Last Game – the Final So-Kei Sen.

=== Scandals ===
In October 2016, six male students from Keio Advertisement Society, a long-standing student club known for its organisation of the Miss Keio pageant contest, were investigated for gang rape during a club activity. An out-of-court settlement was reached and the students were not prosecuted. In May 2018, another three students were arrested for sexual assaults.

In March 2017, a student tennis club was disbanded after a student died of alcohol poisoning during a club activity. Two other Keio students died due to over-drinking in 2012 and 2013.

In June 2017, the school's election committee unconventionally selected Haseyama Akira, a legal history professor who won second place at the general election among teachers and staff, to be the school's new president, breaking a 50-year convention.

In late 2019, both the American football team and the cheerleading club suspended club activities for "inappropriate behaviours".

In January 2020, it was reported that a former member of the school president's secretarial staff had installed a camera in a female toilet stall on the Mita campus, filming over a thousand videos over 3 months.

== Academic rankings and reputation ==
University rankings
Global
THE	General	601–800
QS	General	=215
ARWU	Research	301–400

Regional
THE Asia (Asia version)	General	=197
QS Asia (Asia version)	General	=48

National

Program rankings
Social Sciences & Humanities

LAW
Asahi National	Research	2

Natural Sciences & Technology

Engineering
QS World	General	179

In 2017 Keio ranked 53rd in the world in the Times Higher Education's Alma Mater Index. In 2014 it ranked 34th globally in the Center for World University Rankings (CWUR) and 3rd in Asia. In 2016 Keio ranked at 58th of the Reuters Top 100 innovative universities worldwide. British Quacquarelli Symonds (QS) company estimates that Keio is ranked the 192nd in QS World University Rankings 2017/18. It is ranked the 45th in QS World University Ranking 2017/18 for Graduate Employability Ranking. In the Asian University Ranking (2015), Quacquarelli Symonds also ranked Keio as 37th in Asia. The Academic Ranking of World Universities (2015), which is compiled by Shanghai Jiao Tong University, ranks Keio 151-175 in the world and 37 in Asia.

=== Research performance ===
According to Thomson Reuters, Keio is the 10th best research university in Japan, the only private university within the Top 15. Keio has provided 3 presidents of Japanese Economic Association in its 42-year history, and this number is 5th largest.

==== Business ====
Keio University ranks second in Japan, for the number of alumni holding CEO positions in Fortune Global 500 companies, according to Mines ParisTech: Professional Ranking of World Universities.

Keio Business School (KBS) is Japan's first business school and one of four Japanese institutions holding The Association to Advance Collegiate Schools of Business (AACSB) accreditation. Eduniversal also ranked Keio as the No.1 in Japan (75th in the world). In Eduniversal Keio is one of 3 Japanese schools categorized in "Universal Business schools with major international influence". In 2012, the Keio Business School became a founding member of the university alliance Council on Business & Society.

==== Medicine ====
There have been four presidents of Japan Medical Association related to this university (two alumni and two professors). (Note: Kitasato Shibasaburō, Taichi Kitajima, Taro Takemi and Toshiro Murase) This number is the 2nd largest among Japanese medical schools. Keio is one of 2 Japanese universities which provided a president for the World Medical Association.

==== Law ====
In 2010 and 2015, Keio University Law School ranked highest among all Japanese universities for the Bar Exam passage rate. The number of Members in Parliament who graduated from Keio is the 3rd highest in Japan.

=== Popularity and selectivity ===
Nikkei BP has been publishing a ranking system called "Brand rankings of Japanese universities" every year, composed of various indicators relating to the reputation and brand power of Japanese institutions. Keio University was placed 1st in 2014, and ranked 2nd in 2015 and 2016 in the Greater Tokyo Area. Webometrics (2008) also ranks Keio University as 3rd in Japan, 11th in Asia, and 208th in the world for quantity and quality of web presence and link visibility.

== Evaluation from Business World ==
The university ranking according to the order of the evaluation by Personnel Departments of Leading Companies in Japan
	Ranking
Japan	15th (out of 781 universities in Japan as of 2020)
Source	2020 Nikkei Survey to all listed (3,714) and leading unlisted (1,100), totally 4,814 companies

== Finance ==
Operating revenues/expenses in 2010
Revenues	(yen in millions)	ratio	Expenses	(yen in millions)	ratio
Tuition and fees	49,204	24.97%	Compensation and benefits	65,270	33.12%
Investment return	4,170	2.12%	Education & Research	52,148	26.46%
Capital gain	20,817	10.56%	Investment	32,923	16.71%
National appropriation/Grants (Direct)	17,082	8.67%	Repayment of debt	13,236	6.72%
Medical care	48,274	24.50%			
Debt loan	11,680	5.93%			
Endowments	5,475	2.78%			
Total	197,061	100.00%	Total	197,061	100.00%

According to Keio's financial report, there was an operating revenue of 197 billion yen in 2010. The top three largest incomes were from "tuition and fees", "medical care" and "capital gain", with 49 billion yen, 48 billion yen and 21 billion yen respectively. The number of endowments in 2010 was about 5 billion yen. Keio is known for having one of the largest financial endowments of any Japanese university.

On the other hand, the top 3 largest expenses in 2010 were "Compensation and benefits", "Education & Research" and "Investment", with 65 billion yen, 52 billion yen and 33 billion yen respectively. The total asset value in 2010 was about 364 billion yen with an increase of 5 billion yen. In addition, the total amount of assets under management was approximately 109 billion yen in 2010, composed mainly of cash, deposits with banks and marketable securities.

=== Tuition fees ===
Tuition fees
Undergraduate	4 years in Total (yen)	Per year (yen)
Social Science & Humanities	4,440,000	1,110,000
Natural Science & Engineering	6,280,000	1,570,000
SFC	5,320,000	1,330,000
School of Medicine	14,440,000	3,610,000
Graduate	2 years in Total (yen)	Per year (yen)
Social Science & Humanities	1,380,000	690,000
Natural Science & Engineering	1,965,000	983,000
SFC	2,071,000	1,035,000
School of Medicine	2,625,000	1,313,000

At Keio University, tuition fees vary and depends on the course. Social Science & Humanity studies have the lowest fees at approximately 1,110,000 yen per year, with the School of Medicine having the highest fees of around 3,610,000 yen per year. The tuition fees for various graduate schools cost much less than those for undergraduate studies, e.g. 690,000 yen per year for Social Science & Humanities and 1,313,000 yen per year for School of Medicine.

Although it is acceptable to pay twice with half in spring and half in autumn, the "entrance fee" must be paid before enrolment. The entrance fee for undergraduate study is 200,000 yen and the one for graduate study is 310,000 yen.

=== Scholarship/loan ===
Scholarship/loan
2008	the number of students	ratio	average amount (yen)
Total using scholarship/loan	9,764	30.25%	
Total of using scholarship funded by Keio	3,000	9.30%	300,000
International students (undergraduate)	397	appx. 100%	259,942
International students (graduate)	359	appx. 75%	517,473

In 2008, 9,764 students (about 30% of all students) used either scholarships or loans throughout their studies. Additionally, Keio funds over 3,000 students who receive, on average, scholarships of 300,000 yen.

== Organization ==
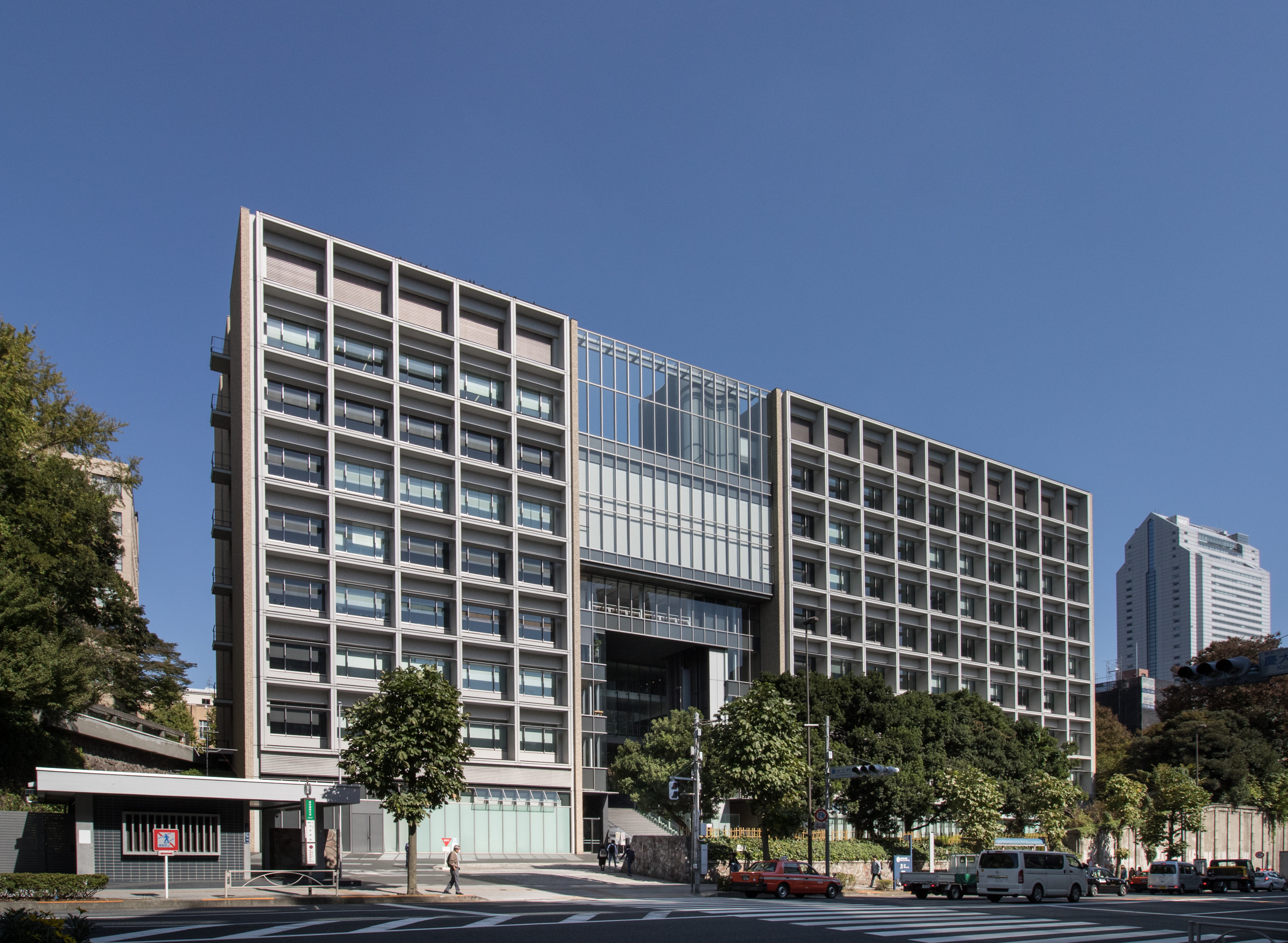
New South building on Mita Campus

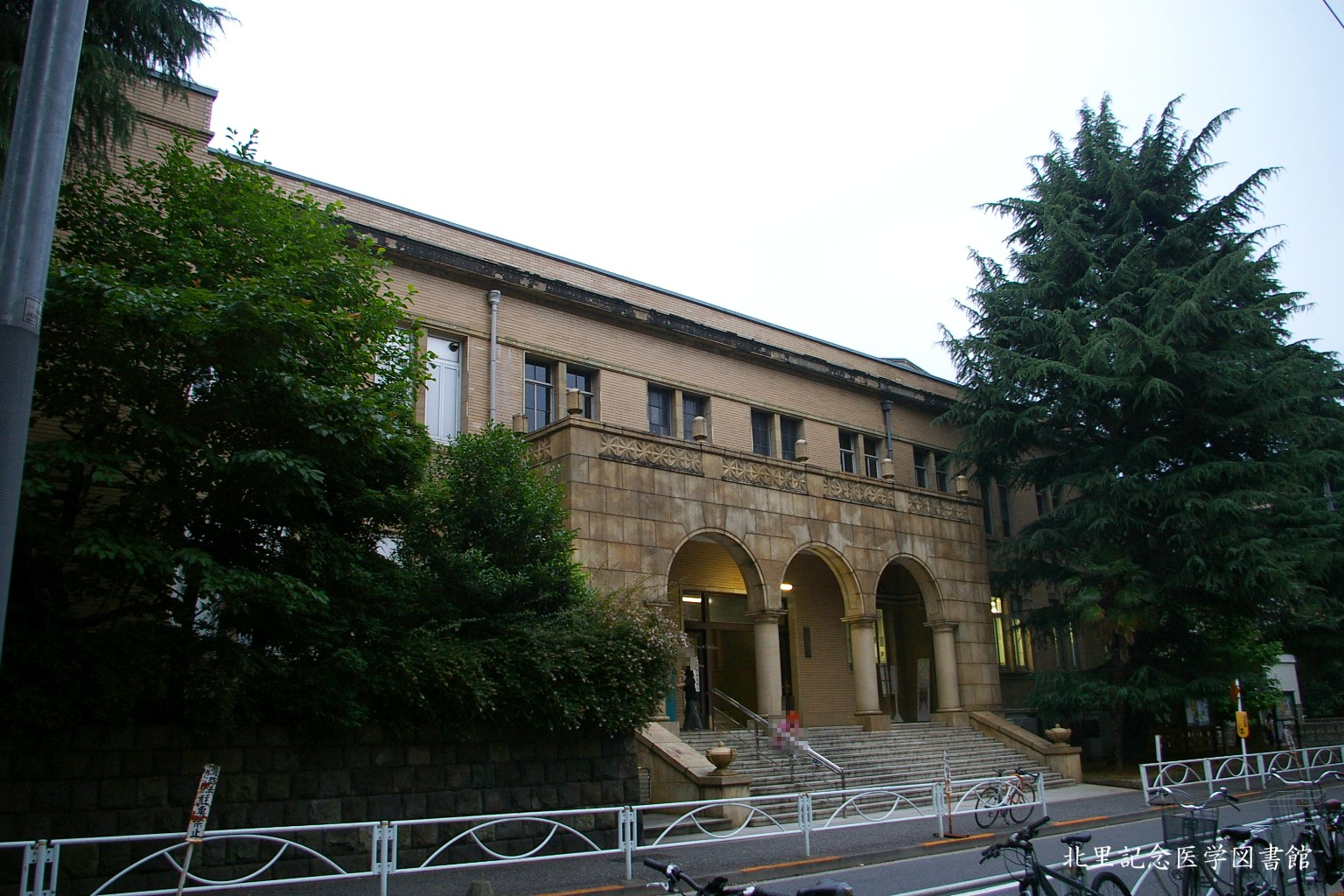
Kitasato Memorial Medical Library on Shinanomachi campus

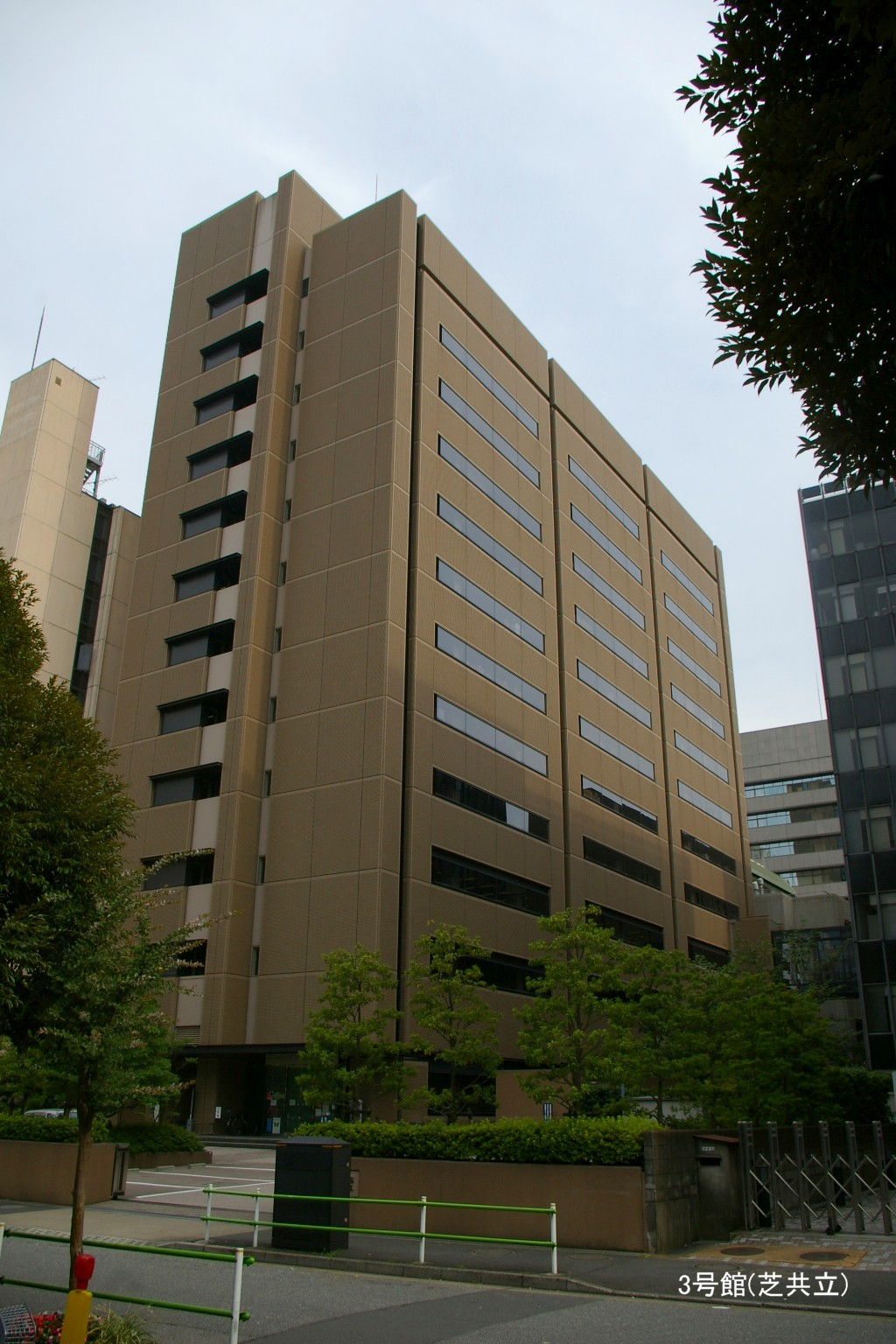
3rd Building on Shiba Kyoritsu campus

=== Faculties ===
Keio University has ten undergraduate faculties, with each operating independently and offering educational and research activities. The faculties, with a planned annual number of enrolled first-year students in parentheses, are:

- Faculty of Letters (800)
- Faculty of Economics (1200)
- Faculty of Law (1200)
- Faculty of Business and Commerce (1000)
- School of Medicine (112)
- Faculty of Science and Technology (932)
- Faculty of Policy Management (425)
- Faculty of Environment and Information Studies (425)
- Faculty of Nursing and Medical Care (100)
- Faculty of Pharmacy (210)

=== Graduate schools ===
Keio has fourteen graduate schools. Many professors are associated with both an undergraduate faculty and a graduate school.

- Graduate School of Letters
- Graduate School of Economics
- Graduate School of Law
- Graduate School of Human Relations
- Graduate School of Business and Commerce
- Graduate School of Medicine
- Graduate School of Science and Technology
- Graduate School of Business Administration
- Graduate School of Media and Governance
- Graduate School of Health Management
- Graduate School of Pharmaceutical Sciences
- Law School
- Graduate School of Media Design
- Graduate School of System Design and Management

=== Media Centers ===
Keio's Media Centers, with combined holdings of over 4.58 million books and publications, are one of the largest academic information storehouses in the country.

- Mita Media Center
- Hiyoshi Media Center
- Media Center for Science and Technology
- Shinanomachi Media Center
- SFC Media Center

=== Information technology Centers ===
- ITC Headquarters
- Mita ITC
- Hiyoshi ITC
- Shinanomachi ITC
- Science & Technology ITC
- Shonan Fujisawa ITC

=== Hospital ===
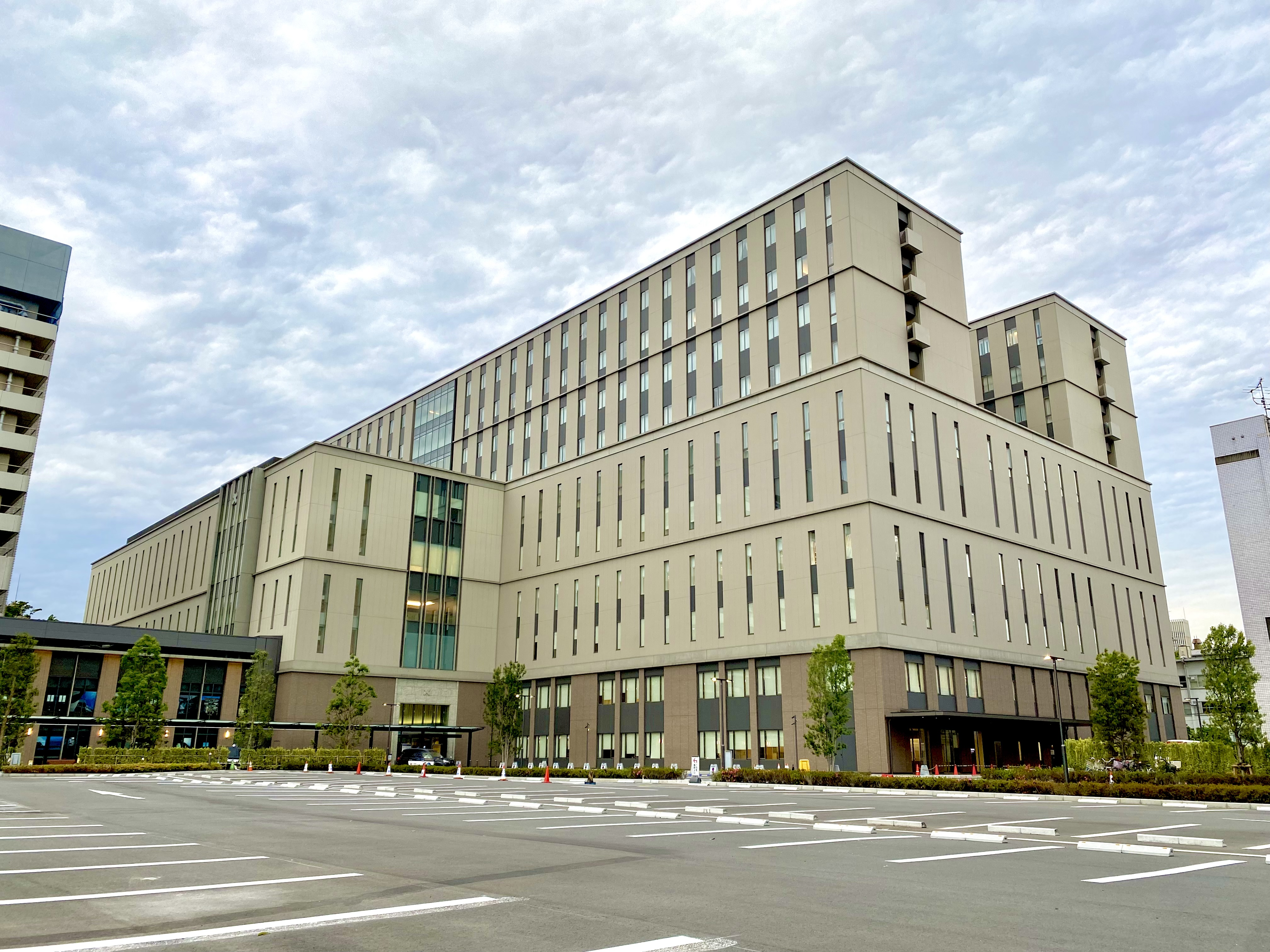
Keio University Hospital

Keio University Hospital is one of the largest general hospitals in Japan, the number of surgeries for carcinoma uteri in 2007 was top and the one for lung cancer was third among all university hospitals. The number of trainee doctors who selected Keio as their first choice training hospital was 30 (33rd) among all Japanese teaching hospitals in 2010. Established in 1920, it has over 1,000 beds, a leading laboratory, and research and medical information divisions.

- Keio University Hospital (慶應義塾大学病院 or 慶應大学病院)

== Campuses ==
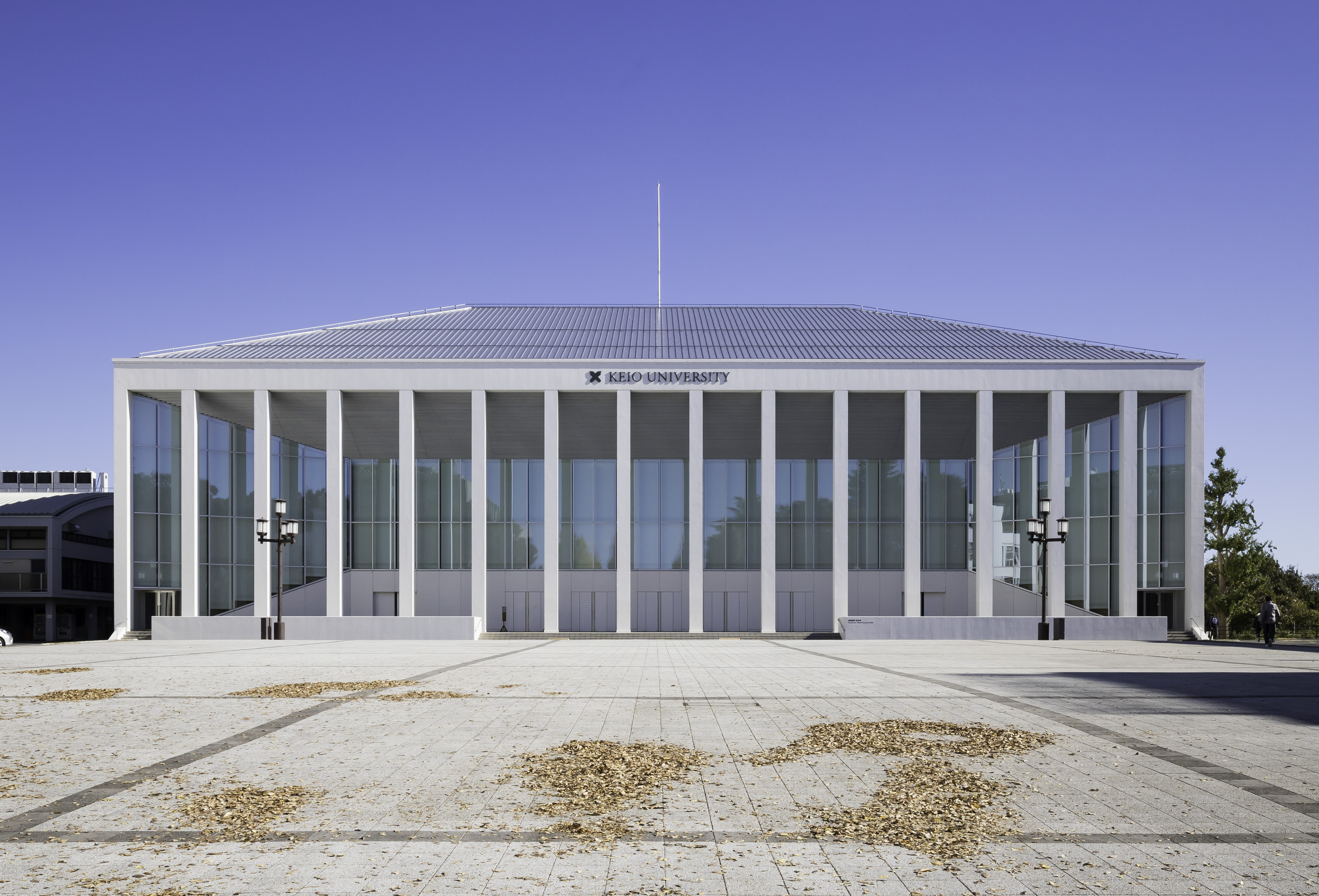
Hiyoshi Commemorative Hall

There are eleven campuses.

- Mita Campus (2-15-45 Mita, Minato, Tokyo)
- Hiyoshi Campus (4-1-1 Hiyoshi, Kohoku, Yokohama, Kanagawa), home of the Hiyoshi tunnels
- Yagami Campus (3-14-1 Hiyoshi, Kohoku, Yokohama, Kanagawa)
- Shinanomachi Campus (35 Shinanomachi, Shinjuku, Tokyo)
- Shonan Fujisawa Campus (Fujisawa, Kanagawa, aka. SFC) designed by Fumihiko Maki
- Shiba Kyoritsu Campus (Minato ward, Tokyo)
- Shin-Kawasaki Town Campus (Kawasaki, Kanagawa)
- Tsuruoka Town Campus of Keio (Tsuruoka, Yamagata, aka. TTCK)
- Urawa Kyoritsu Campus (Urawa, Saitama)
- Keio Osaka Riverside Campus (Osaka)
- Keio Marunouchi City Campus (Tokyo)

== Notable alumni ==
Keio alumni include Japanese prime ministers Shigeru Ishiba (2024–2025), Junichiro Koizumi (2001–2006), Ryutaro Hashimoto (1996–1998), and Tsuyoshi Inukai (1931–1932). Dozens of other alumni have been cabinet members and governors in the post-war period. Keio alumni include 230 CEOs of major companies and 97 CEOs of foreign-affiliated companies. Keio has over 320,000 alumni in 866 alumni associations.

=== Politicians ===
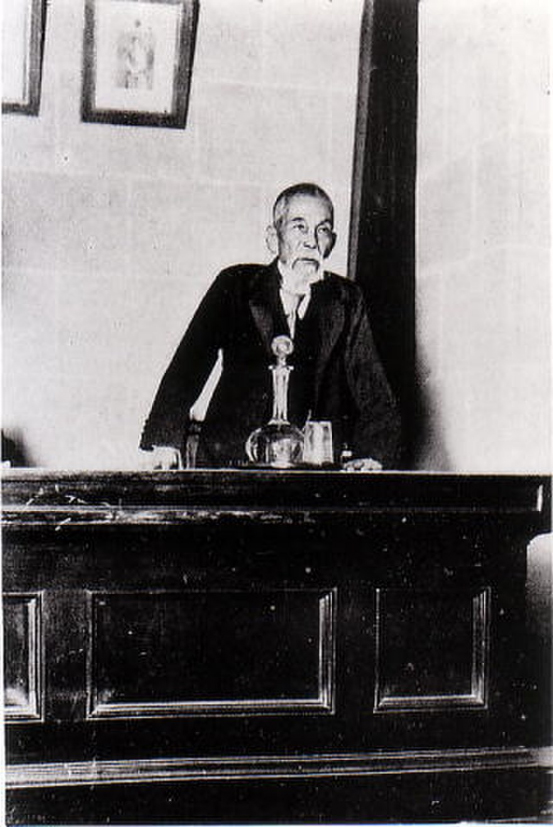
Former Japanese prime minister Tsuyoshi Inukai (1931–1932)

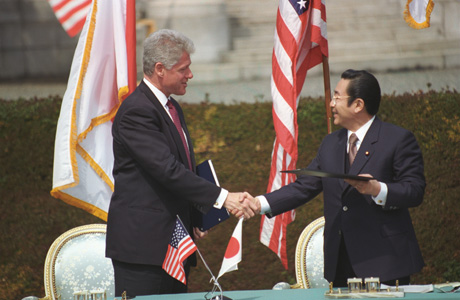
Former Japanese prime minister Ryutaro Hashimoto (1996–1998)

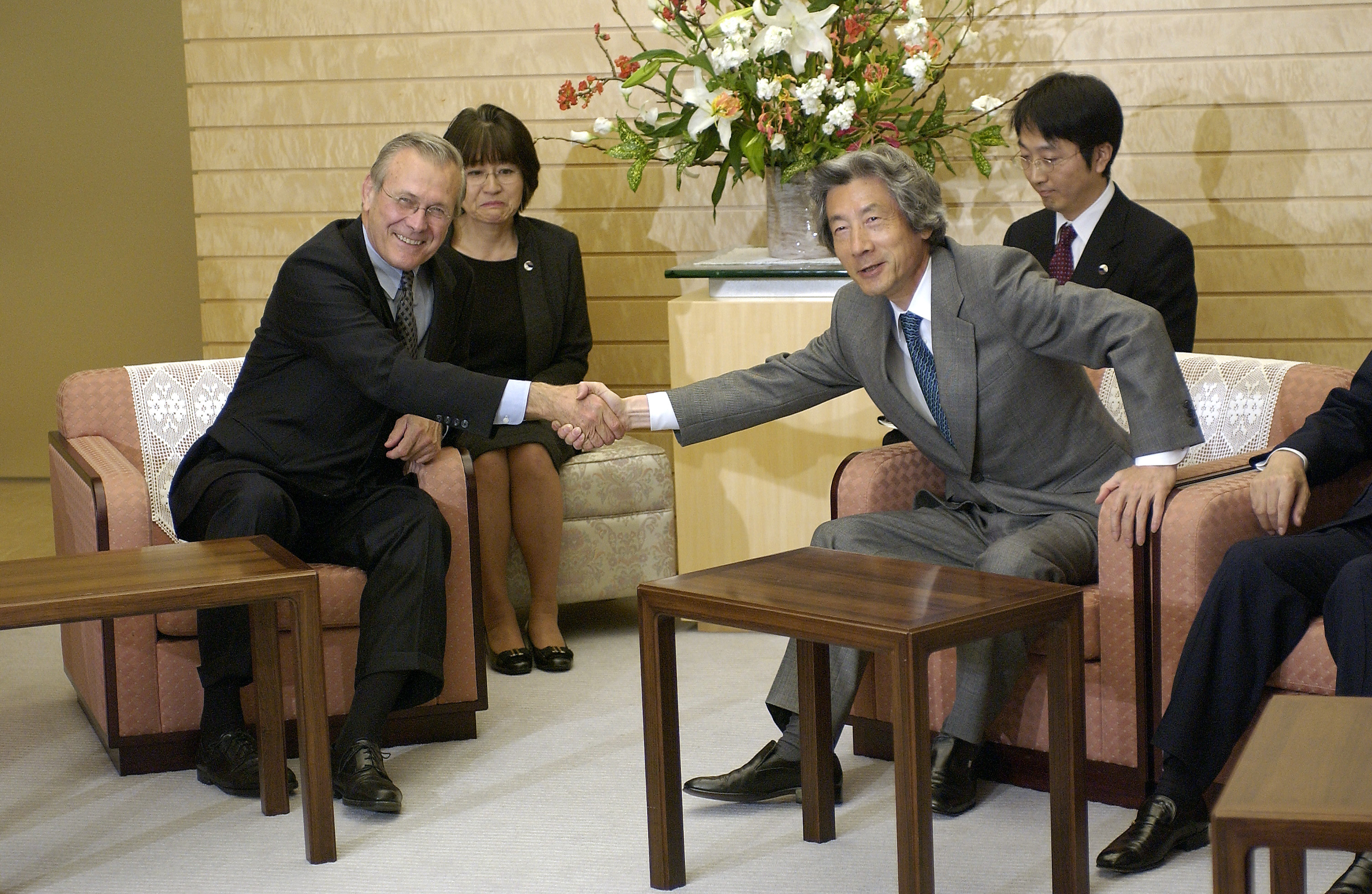
Former Japanese prime minister Junichiro Koizumi (2001–2006)

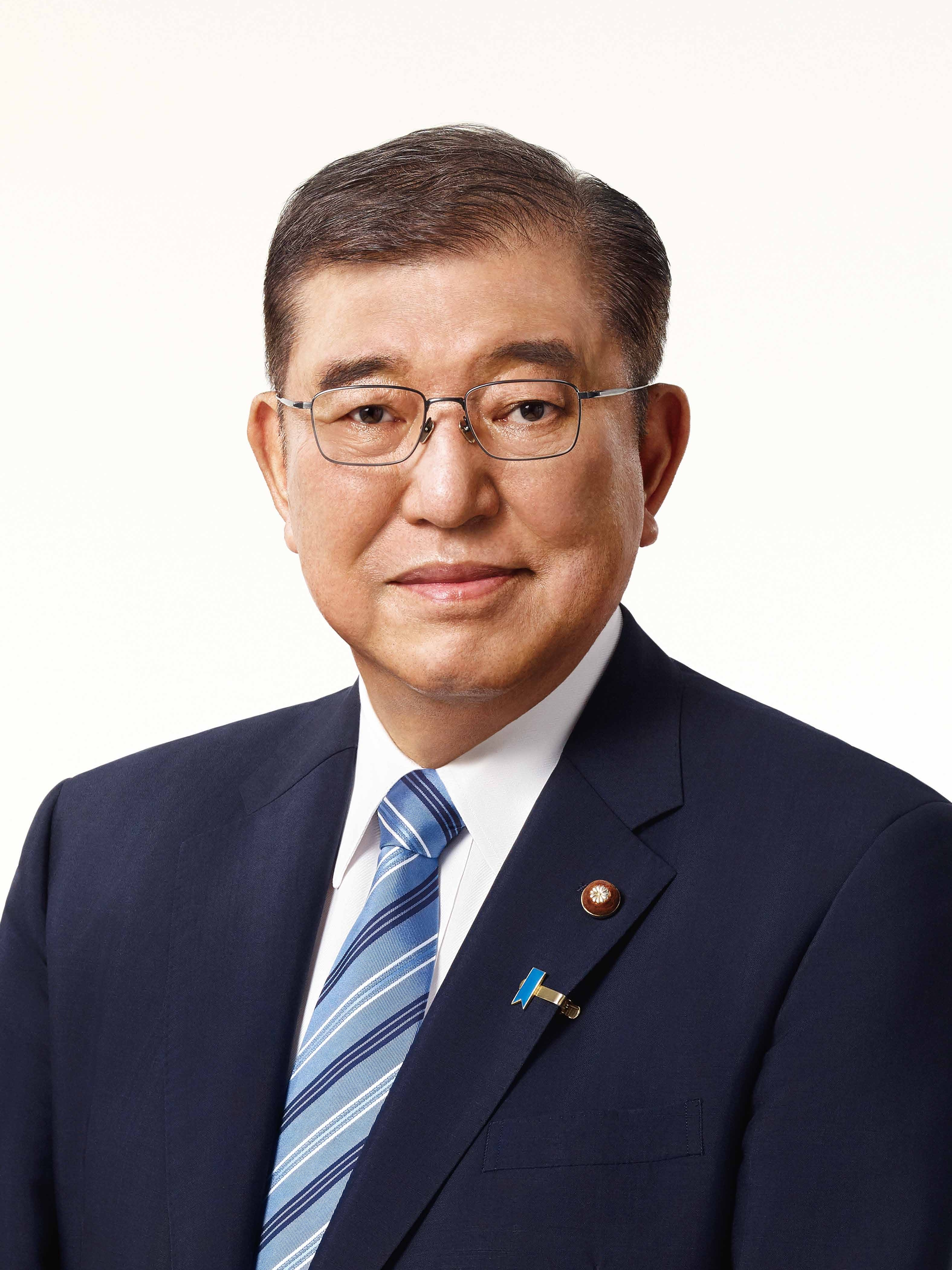
Japanese prime minister Shigeru Ishiba (2024–2025)

- Jun Mukōyama, politician
- Shigeru Ishiba, 102nd Prime Minister of Japan (2024–2025), Minister of Defense, Minister of Agriculture, Forestry and Fisheries (Law, 1979)
- Junichiro Koizumi, the 87th/88th/89th Prime Minister of Japan (2001–2006), the 20th president of Liberal Democratic Party of Japan (Economics, 1967)
- Ryutaro Hashimoto, the 82nd/83rd Prime Minister of Japan (1996–1998), the 17th president of Liberal Democratic Party of Japan (Law, 1960)
- Tsuyoshi Inukai, the 29th Prime Minister of Japan (1931–1932), the 6th president of Rikken Seiyūkai
- Ichirō Ozawa, former president of Democratic Party of Japan, Former Secretary General of Liberal Democratic Party of Japan (Economics, 1967)
- Tamisuke Watanuki, president of People's New Party, Former Speaker of The House of Representatives of Japan (Economics, 1950)
- Toshiko Hamayotsu, Minister for Global Environmental Issues and Director-General of Environment Agency of Government of Japan (1994).
- Kenji Kosaka, Minister of Education, Culture, Sports, Science and Technology (Law, 1968)
- Jirō Kawasaki, Minister of Health, Labour and Welfare (Business and Commerce, 1971)
- Andrew Thomson, Minister for Sport and Tourism and Minister Assisting the Prime Minister for the Sydney 2000 Games in the Australian Government 1997 – 1998
- Shigefumi Matsuzawa, Governor of Kanagawa (Law, 1982)
- Akihiko Noro, Governor of Mie (Science and Technology, 1969)
- Genjirō Kaneko, Minister of Agriculture, Forestry and Fisheries (2021-2022), Governor of Nagasaki (Letters, 1968)
- Motohiro Ōno, Governor of Saitama (Law, 1987)
- Hiroshi Nakai, Chairman of the National Commission on Public Safety, Minister of State for Disaster Management and the Abduction Issue (Economics, 1969)
- Yūzan Fujita, Governor of Hiroshima (Business and Commerce, 1972)
- Ryōzō Hiranuma, Mayor of Yokohama, Order of Culture
- Keiichi Inamine, Governor of Okinawa (Economics, 1957)
- Masaharu Ikuta, president of Japan Post, former CEO of Mitsui O.S.K. Lines (Economics, 1957)
- Yukio Ozaki, Mayor of Tokyo, Minister of Justice, Education, "Father of parliamentary politics" in Japan.
- Nobuteru Ishihara, Minister of Land, Infrastructure and Transport, Minister of State for Administrative and Regulatory Reform, Candidate for the LDP presidency 2008
- Heitaro Inagaki, Minister of Economy, Trade and Industry (Economics, 1913)
- Banri Kaieda, Minister of Economy, Trade and Industry (Law)
- Hirofumi Nakasone, Minister for Foreign Affairs
- Yoshio Sakurauchi, Minister for Foreign Affairs
- Kamata Eikichi, Minister of Education
- Hidenao Nakagawa, Chief Cabinet Secretary
- Mitsuo Horiuchi, Minister of International Trade and Industry
- Yoshiyuki Kamei, Minister of Agriculture, Forestry and Fisheries
- Seiichi Ota, Minister of Agriculture, Forestry and Fisheries
- Ryu Shionoya, Minister of Education, Science and Technology
- Kosuke Hori, Minister of Education
- Fusanosuke Kuhara, Minister of communications
- Kazuyoshi Kaneko, Minister of Land, Infrastructure, Transport and Tourism and Minister for Ocean Policy
- Takeo Kawamura, Minister of Education, Science and Technology and Chief Cabinet Secretary
- Koichi Yamamoto, Minister of Environment
- Akira Amari, Minister of Economy, Trade and Industry and Minister of State in charge of Administrative Reform
- Tatsuya Ito, Minister of State for Financial Services
- Tadamori Oshima, Minister of Agriculture
- Takeo Hiranuma, Minister of Transport and Minister of Economy, Trade, and Industry
- Akira Nagatsuma, Minister of Health, Labour and Welfare, Minister of State for Pension Reform
- Masajuro Shiokawa, Chief Cabinet Secretary of Japan
- Heizō Takenaka, Minister of Internal Affairs and Communications (Emeritus Prof.)
- Wataru Takeshita, Minister for Reconstruction
- Jon Richards, Wisconsin legislator
- Sommai Hoontakoon, Minister of Finance (Thailand) (Economics, 1942)
- Set Aung – politician, economist and management consultant, incumbent Deputy Planning and Finance Minister of Myanmar
- Yun Duk-min –ambassador of South Korea to Japan

=== Public servants, international Organizations ===
- Takeshi Kasai, WHO Regional Director of Western Pacific (medicine, 1990)
- Shigeru Omi, WHO Regional Director of Western Pacific,
- Kiyoko Okabe, the first female justice of the Supreme Court of Japan (Master, Law, 1974)
- Taro Takemi, president of the World Medical Association and Japan Medical Association (MD, medicine, 1930)
- Ichirō Fujisaki, diplomat, Chairman of Executive Committee of United Nations High Commissioner for Refugees (Economics (dropout), 1969)

=== Central Bank Governors ===
- Shigeaki Ikeda, Minister of Finance, Commerce and Industry, Governor of The Bank of Japan
- Makoto Usami, Governor of The Bank of Japan
- Tarisa Watanagase (Thai), Governor of the Bank of Thailand, 2006–2010 (Economics)
- Chang Kia-ngau (Economics, 1906–1908), Governor of the Central Bank of Republic of China

=== Astronauts ===
- Chiaki Mukai, JAXA astronaut (MD, medicine, 1988)
- Akihiko Hoshide, JAXA astronaut

=== Finance ===
- Taizo Nishimuro, chairman and CEO of Tokyo Stock Exchange, former CEO of Toshiba Corporation (Economics 1961)
- Koichiro Miyahara, chairman and CEO of Tokyo Stock Exchange
- Atsushi Saito, chairman and CEO of Tokyo Stock Exchange,
- Shigeharu Suzuki, president and CEO of Daiwa Securities Group (Economics 1971)

=== Media ===
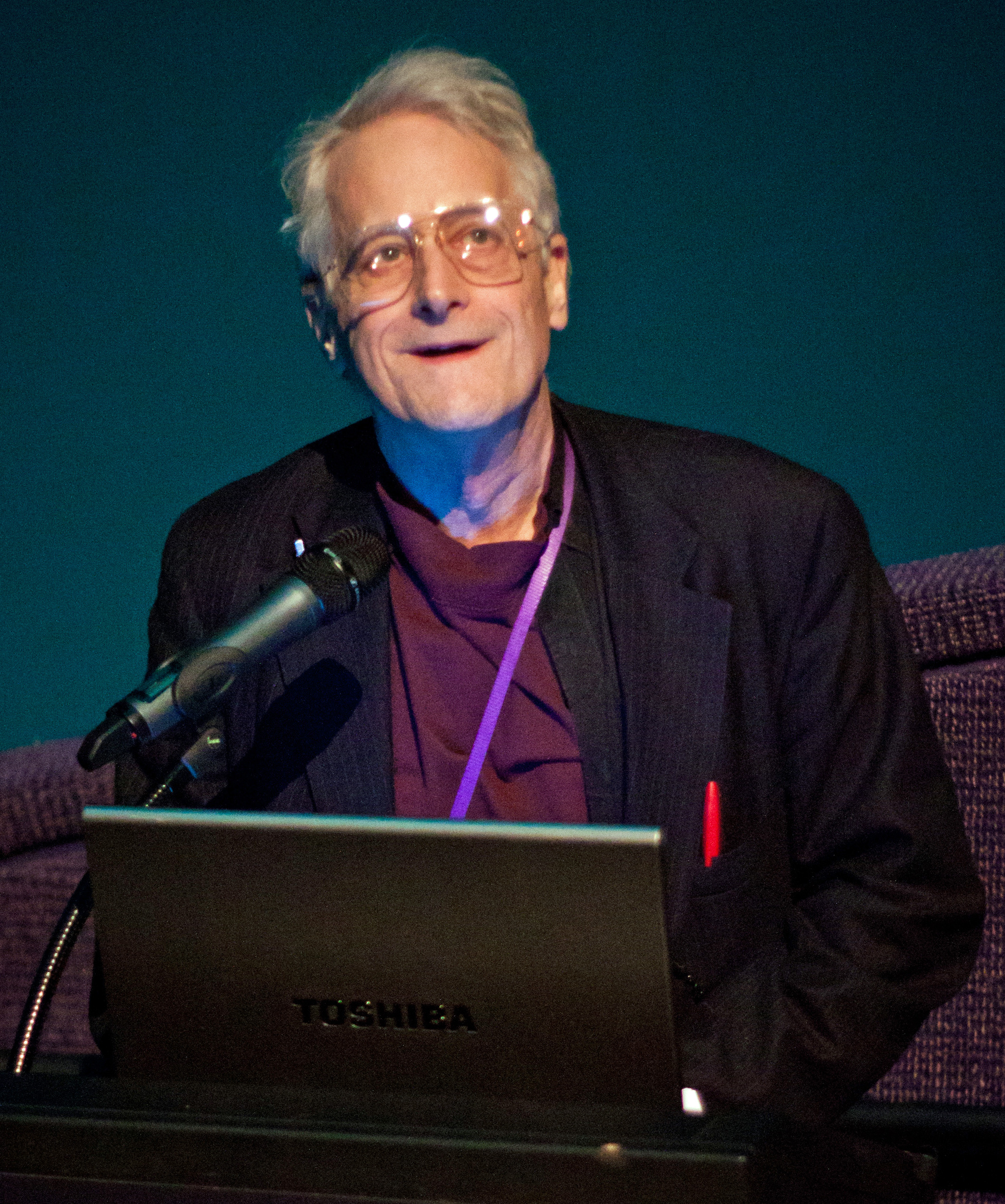
American sociologist Ted Nelson

- Tōru Shōriki, owner of The Yomiuri Shimbun (Economics, 1942)
- Tarō Kimura, journalist (Law, 1964)
- Akira Ikegami, journalist (Economics, 1973)
- Kazuhiko Torishima, president of Hakusensha (Law, 1976)
- Motoaki Tanigo, CEO of Hololive Production (Science and Technology)

=== Business ===
- Akio Toyoda, President and CEO Toyota 2009–current
- Yutaka Katayama, the first president of the U.S. operations of Nissan (Economics 1935)
- Osamu Nagayama, CEO of Chugai Pharmaceutical and Chairman of Sony
- Katsuaki Watanabe, President of Toyota (Economics 1964).
- Yuzaburo Mogi, Chairman and CEO of Kikkoman Corporation (Law 1958)
- Yotaro Kobayashi (Economics, 1956), chairman of Fuji Xerox, former chairman of Japan Association of Corporate Executives
- Shinzo Maeda, President and CEO of Shiseido (Letters 1970)
- Hidetaka Miyazaki, President of FromSoftware, game designer and director
- Ichizō Kobayashi, Founder of Hankyu Railway and the Takarazuka Revue, Minister of Commerce and Industry in the 1940 Konoe Cabinet
- Nobutada Saji, Chief executive of Suntory Ltd., the wealthiest individual in Japan as of 2004 by Forbes
- Akira Mori, President and CEO of Mori Trust, the fourth-wealthiest person in Japan as of 2013 by Forbes
- Keiichi Ishizaka, chairman and CEO, Warner Music Japan Inc. (Business and Commerce, 1968) – 2009 Medal of Honor Awardee
- Lee Jae-yong, executive chairman of Samsung Electronics (MBA 1995)
- Takeo Shiina, Chairman of IBM Japan, former chairman of Japan Association of Corporate Executives (Science and Technology 1951)
- Matsuo Yokoyama, former president of Walt Disney Enterprises of Japan

=== Academia ===
- Sho-Chieh Tsiang (undergraduate atten.), member of Academia Sinica
- Toshihiko Izutsu (literature, 1937), Member of Japan Academy
- Akira Hayami (economics, 1954), Member of Japan Academy, coined the notion of "Industrious Revolution"
- Tokuzo Fukuda (prof.), Member of Japan Academy
- Junzaburo Nishiwaki (economics, 1917), nominated for Nobel Prize, International Honorary Member of American Academy of Arts and Sciences
- David J. Farber, fellow, American Association for the Advancement of Science (the Distinguished Professor and Co-Director of Cyber Civilization Research Center)
- Hamao Arata (1869), the third and eighth President of the Tokyo Imperial University
- Sahachiro Hata (Prof.), nominated for Nobel Prize, member of Japan Academy,
- Ken Sakamura (engineering, 1974), emeritus professor of University of Tokyo, Japan Academy Prize (academics), the creator of the real-time operating system architecture TRON project
- Takao Suzuki (sociolinguist) (literature, 1950), former professor of Yale University
- Hideyuki Okano (medicine, 1983)
- Yoshitaka Tanimura, derived Hierarchical equations of motion with Ryogo Kubo, Professor of Kyoto University, Humboldt Prize Winner (Sci.and Tech)

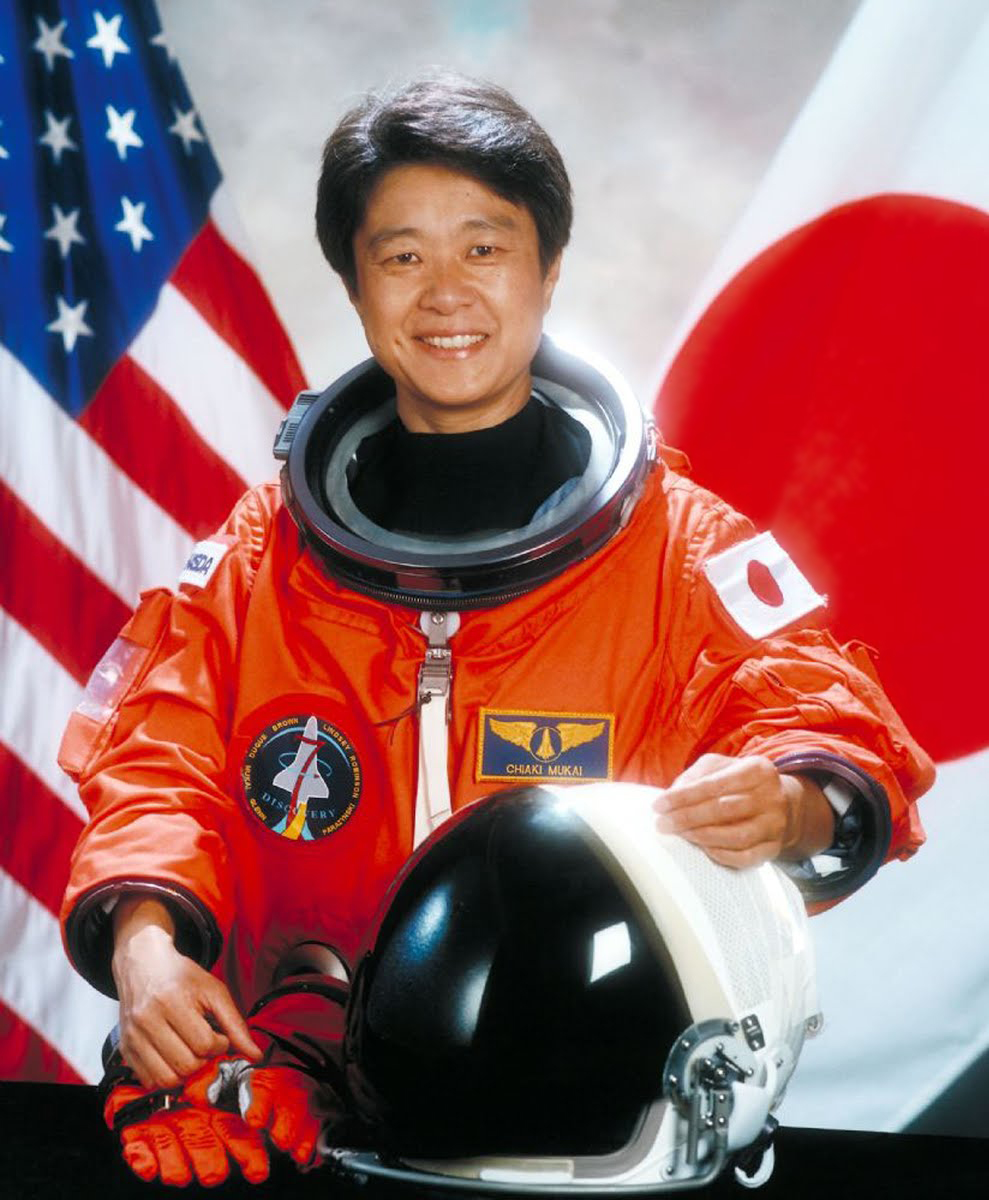
JAXA astronaut Chiaki Mukai

- Masayoshi Tomizuka (B.S. and M.S. degrees, Mechanical Engineering, 1968 and 1970)
- Tatsuji Nomura (medicine, 1945), a pioneer in the development of laboratory animals with the aim of assuring the reproducibility of experimental results in medical research. Medal of Honor With Purple Ribbon from Japanese Government(1984).
- Fumiko Yonezawa (Emeritus), The first female President of The Physical Society of Japan, the Laureate of L'Oréal-UNESCO For Women in Science Awards in 2005.
- Yasuhiro Matsuda, professor of international politics at the University of Tokyo (Law)
- Yoshihiro Tsurumi, professor of international business at Baruch College of the City University of New York (Economics)
- Jun Murai, "The Father of The Internet" in Japan, Legion of Honor (2018) (PhD, Engineering)
- Yasuhiro Koike, Developed the High-bandwidth graded-index plastic optical fibre.
  He is thought as one of the Nobel Prize candidates in Physics in terms of the achievement of plastic optical fibre. (Sci. and Tech)
- Masaru Tomita, Established the metabolomics analysis by using the CE-MS. (Environment and Information Studies)
- Eitaro Noro, Marxian Economist. Author of History of the Development of Japanese Capitalism (日本資本主義発達史講座) (1930), Iwanami Shoten, Tokyo
- Yuichi Motai, professor of electrical and computer engineering at Virginia Commonwealth University, NSF Career Award (2011)
- Joi Ito, former director of the MIT Media Lab, professor at Massachusetts Institute of Technology and Harvard University (PhD, Media and Governance, 2018)

=== Art ===
- Shotaro Yasuoka, Member of Japan Art Academy
- Yamamoto Kenkichi, Member of Japan Art Academy
- Hiroshi Sakagami, Member of Japan Art Academy
- Shusaku Endo (Literature, 1948) Akutagawa Prize, Order of Culture, honorary doctorate from Georgetown University
- Daigaku Horiguchi, Poet, Translator, Member of Japan Art Academy
- Tanaka Chikao, Member of Japan Art Academy (Literature)
- Rofū Miki (undergraduate attendee), poet
- Gozo Yoshimasu, Member of Japan Art Academy
- Jun Etō, Member of Japan Art Academy, literary critic
- Mantaro Kubota, Member of Japan Art Academy
- Haruo Sato, Member of Japan Art Academy (Literature)
- Kafū Nagai, Member of Japan Art Academy, Order of Culture (Prof.)
- Shinobu Orikuchi, Ethnologist (Emeritus prof.)
- Takitaro Minakami, author (Economics)
- Yojiro Ishizaka, author (Literature)
- Sakutarō Hagiwara, Poet
- Yumeno Kyūsaku, Surrealistic detective novelist
- Kazuki Kaneshiro, Zainichi Korean novelist
- Kôhei Tsuka, playwright, theatre director, and screenwriter
- Adebayo Adewusi, Lawyer and Public Administrator.
- Yoshio Taniguchi (Engineering, 1960), member of Japan Art Academy. Architect best known for his redesign of the Museum of Modern Art in New York City which was reopened on November 20, 2004,
- Fumihiko Maki (Keio High school, undergraduate attend.), International Honorary Member of American Academy of Arts and Sciences, Wolf Prize in Arts,
- Kyoko Matsuoka, author and translator of children's literature.
- Naoko Takeuchi, manga artist and the creator of Sailor Moon.

=== Others ===
- Mariya Takeuchi - singer-songwriter and record producer, regarded as the "Queen of City Pop"
- Ryuichi Kuki, Envoy Extraordinary and Minister Plenipotentiary, Governor of The Imperial Museum (The Tokyo National Museum, Kyoto National Museum, and Nara National Museum), The Father of Syuzo Kuki (1874)
- Theodor Holm "Ted" Nelson, Computer architect, visionary, and contrarian (PhD, Media and Governance, 2002)
- Wataru Kamimura, professional shogi player (the first university graduate to become a shogi professional) (Science and Technology / mathematical sciences, 2013)
- Yūka Nishio, voice actress and musician
- Ghib Ojisan, a travel YouTuber based in Singapore
- Emi Ikehata, actress and daughter of Yūzō Kayama.
- Sho Sakurai, singer, actor, entertainer, newscaster, member of Arashi, first artist in Johnny & Associates to graduate from University. (Bachelor of Economics, 2004)
- Miyu Takeuchi - former AKB48 member
- miwa - singer-songwriter
- Masataka Matsutoya - producer, arranger, composer, keyboardist, husband of Yumi Matsutoya
- Yojiro Noda - frontman of RADWIMPS
- Airi Suzuki - former Cute member, solo artist & actress
- Fuma Kikuchi - member of timelesz
- Takanori Iwata - member of Sandaime J Soul Brothers, former member of EXILE
- KREVA - member of KICK THE CAN CREW
- Reina Triendl - actress
- Mina Fujii - actress
- Yuki Furukawa - actor, graduated from the New York school
- Tetsuya Bessho - actor adn radio personality
- Yuna Ogata - voice actress

== Notable faculty ==
- James Cousins, Irish writer
- Fukuzawa Yukichi, Keio founder
- Nicholas Hagger, British writer
- Kohei Itoh, physicist
- Gen'ichi Katō, Nobel Prize-nomimated physiologist
- Kitasato Shibasaburō, physician and bacteriologist
- Nagai Kafu, writer
- Ryogo Kubo, prize-winning mathematical physicist
- Mikinosuke Miyajima, parasitologist
- John Morris, anthropologist
- Nishiwaki Junzaburo, poet
- Yone Noguchi, poet; also alumnus
- Shuichi Nosé, famous for the Nosé–Hoover thermostat
- Toshiyuki Takamiya, medievalist and digital humanities scholar
- Sherard Vines, British poet

== Books ==
- The Keiogijuku University: a brief account of its history, aims and equipment. Keio Gijuku University. 1912.

== See also ==
- Auto-ID Labs
- Eliica
- Keio University Hospital
- Keio Media Centers (Libraries)
- Keio Medical Science Prize
- Keio Shonan-Fujisawa Junior & Senior High School
- Keio University Shonan Fujisawa Campus
- List of National Treasures of Japan (crafts: others)
- Sakura Tsushin ("Sakura Diaries"), a manga and anime series by U-Jin which prominently features Keio University.
