= Keio Media Centers (Libraries) =

Library system of Keio University

Keio Media Centers is the English name used by Keio University in Japan to describe its library system.

The Media Centers (libraries) on the various Keio campuses are important information resources for students, faculty, and researchers. Together, they constitute one of the major academic information storehouses in Japan, holding more than 4.2 million books and publications.

== Worldcat/OCLC ==
Keio University's libraries are fully integrated into the international shared-cataloging system known as OCLC (Online Computer Library Center) and WorldCat, both names being used interchangeably today for the world's largest bibliographic database.

In 2002, Keio University was the first Japanese university library to formally join the Research Libraries Group (RLG), an international consortium of research libraries, archives and museums linked though OCLC. RLG linked more than 140 partner institutions through OCLC, into which it merged in 2006. At the Keio Media Centers, OCLC’s comprehensive global catalog database is fully coordinated and integrated in Worldcat.

== Media Center facilities ==
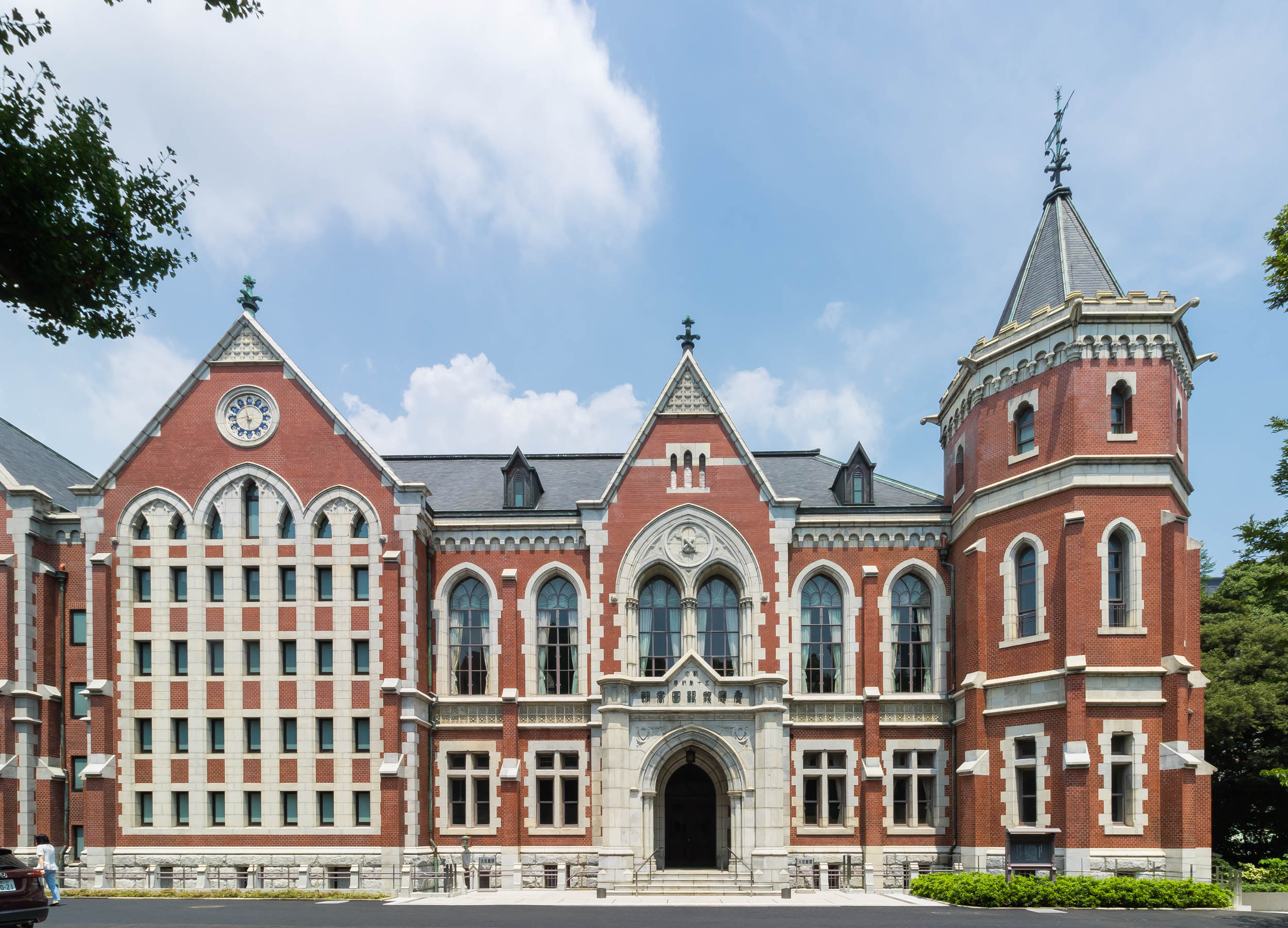
Old Keio Gijyuku library(Mita)

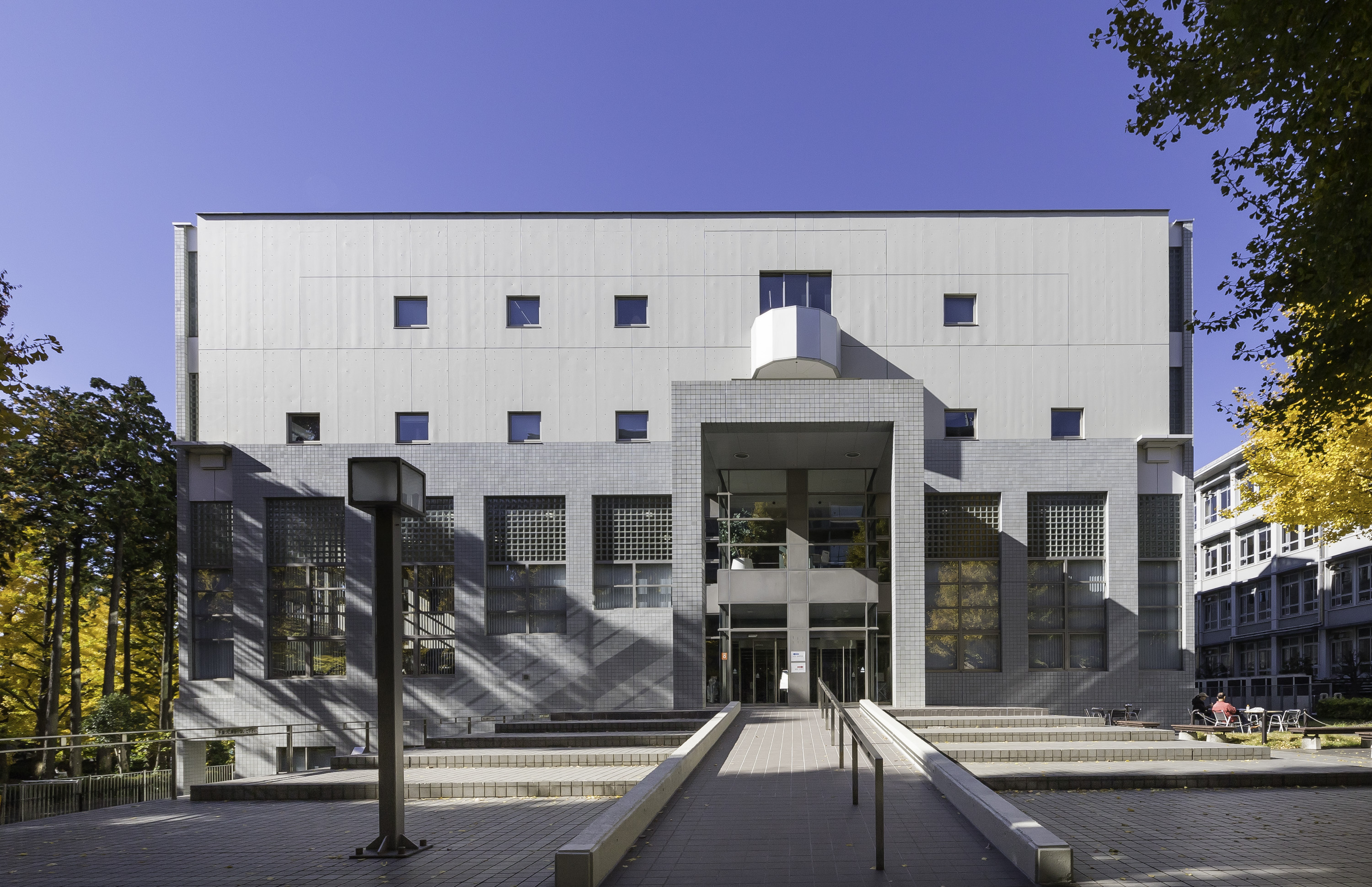
Hiyoshi Media Center

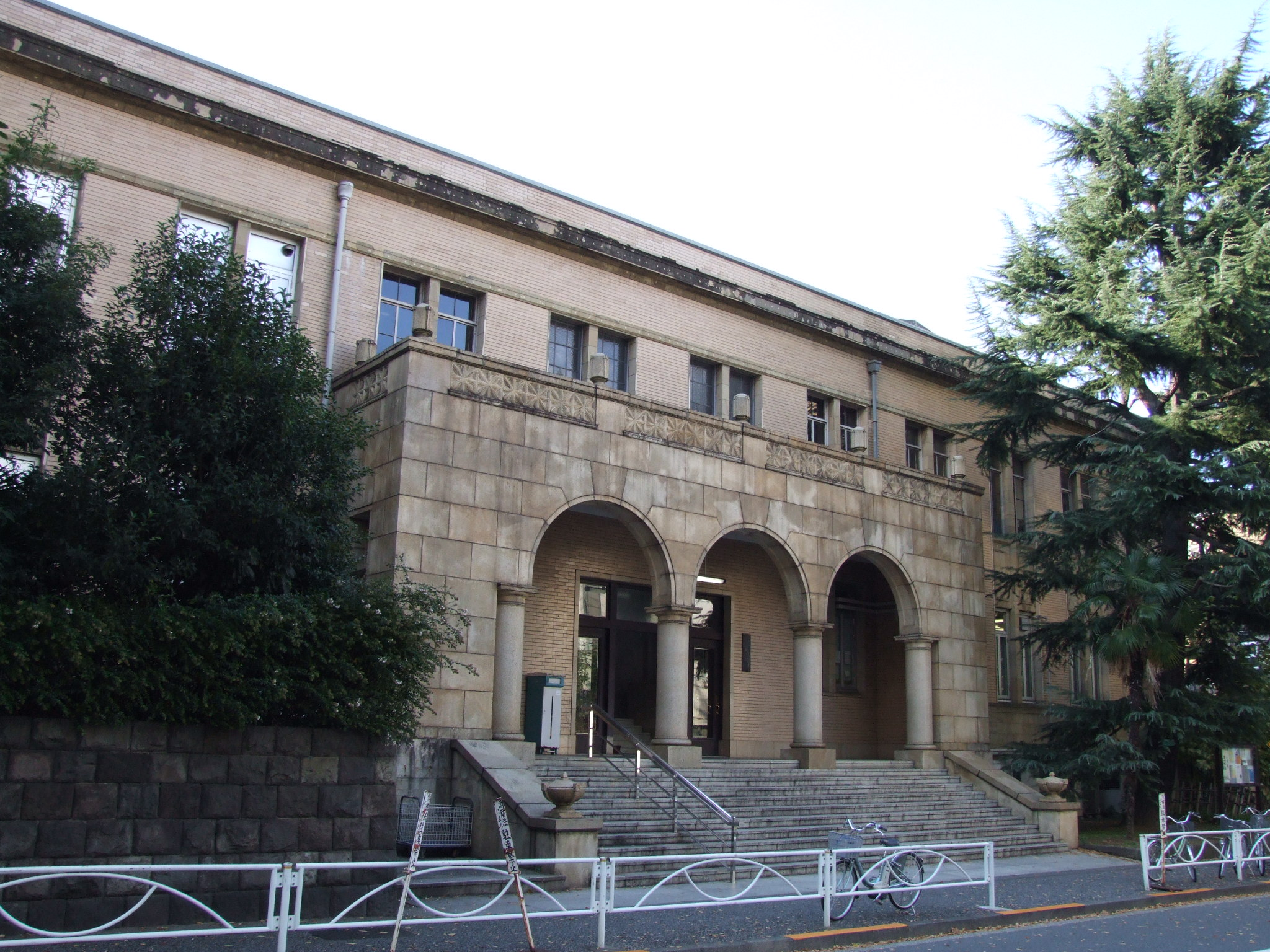
Shinanomachi Media Center

Although the holdings and other elements of the library system are physically separated across a number of campuses, all are linked in an integrated catalog access system.

=== Mita Media Center ===
The Mita Media Center evolved directly from the Keio University library, created in 1912. The library's collection expanded into a new building in 1982. A combined total of 2.3 million books are housed in the Mita Media Center.

A gothic, red-brick library was built in 1912 on the Mita campus (Mita, Minato, Tokyo). This structure has since been known as a symbol of Keio University, and now serves as an archive and venue for functions; it is recognized as an Important Cultural Property by the Japanese Government.

=== Hiyoshi Media Center ===
On the Hiyoshi campus (Hiyoshi, Kōhoku-ku, Yokohama, Kanagawa), the Hiyoshi Media Center was designed primarily as a library for first- and second-year students, who enjoy ready access to academic books as well as a wide variety of general-interest videos, DVDs, and CDs. The media center provides access to online databases and electronic journals.

=== Media Center for Science and Technology ===
The Yagami Campus (Hiyoshi, Kohoku-ku, Yokohama, Kanagawa), home to the Faculty of Science & Technology and the Graduate School of Science & Technology, has the Media Center for Science and Technology. This part of the university library system specializes in science and engineering materials.

=== Shinanomachi Media Center ===
Keio's School and Graduate School of Medicine are on the Shinanomachi campus (Shinanomachi, Shinjuku, Tokyo); the Shinanomachi Media Center is Keio's medical library.

=== SFC Media Center ===
The Shōnan Fujisawa Campus (Endo, Fujisawa-shi, Kanagawa), home to the Faculties of Policy Management, Environment and Information Studies and Nursing & Medical Care and to the Graduate Schools of Media & Governance and Health Management, offers the SFC Media Center (the Shonan Fujisawa Campus Media Center), both a traditional library and a modern information processing center, with multimedia and PC stations connected to the Internet through a campus-wide LAN.

== Treasures ==
Keio's collection of rare books and other "treasures" includes the Keio Gutenberg Bible, natural history books, and medieval manuscripts. The collection of the university was begun in the late 1850s with European Illustrated Books and Manuscripts c.1400-1700. Today the library holdings have expanded to include first and second edition copies of Caxton's Canterbury Tales by Chaucer. The breadth of Western material is balanced by a collection of Japanese maps and Japanese wood-block prints.
