= Hiyoshi tunnels =

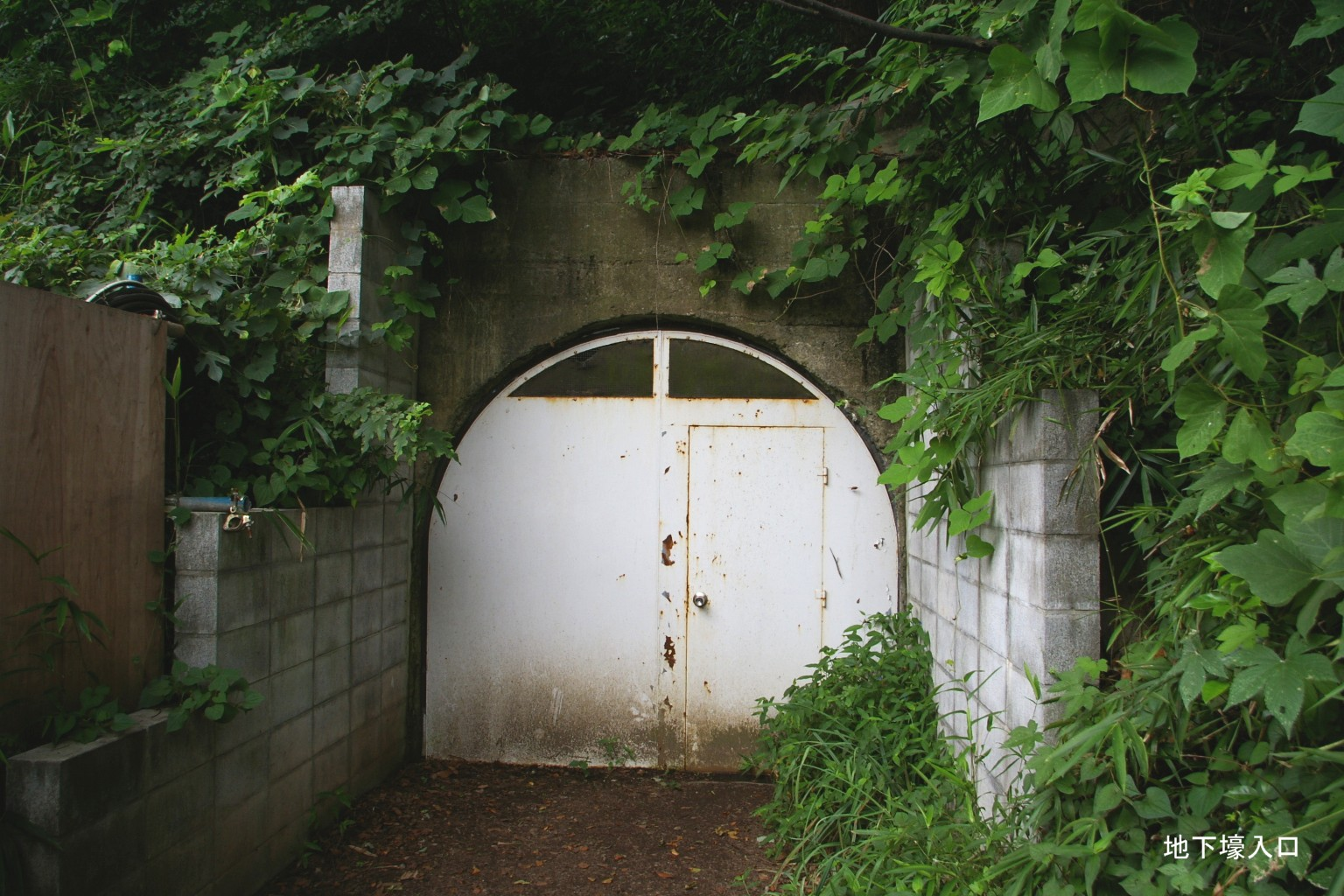
An entrance to the tunnels at Hiyoshi campus of Keio University

The Hiyoshi tunnels (日吉台地下壕, Hiyoshidai chikagō) are a number of connected tunnels under Hiyoshi, Yokohama, Japan. The tunnels served as the headquarters of the combined Fleet of the Imperial Japanese Navy from September 1944. The location was leased to the navy from the Hiyoshi campus of Keio University.

The Association to Preserve the Hiyoshidai Tunnels was founded in the 1980s, and has conducted guided tours to raise awareness of the heritage site. It has had difficulty getting engagement from the University and the government to preserve the tunnels, and some parts have been destroyed during campus development. The tunnels were surveyed in a government survey of some 850 World War II sites and were ranked "A", described as “a historic site essential to the understanding of our modern national history.”

== See also ==
- A Glorious Way to Die
