= Kohei Itoh =

Japanese physicist

- 伊藤 公平

20th President of Keio University
- Incumbent
- Assumed office May 28, 2021
- Preceded by: Akira Haseyama

Professor, Keio University Faculty of Science and Technology
- In office April 2007 – present

Personal details
- Born: 1965 (age 60–61)
- Education: Keio University; University of California, Berkeley
- Occupation: University President, Professor, Researcher

Kohei Ito (伊藤 公平, Itō Kōhei; born 1965) is a Japanese physicist. He is the 20th president of Keio University and Chairman of the Board of Trustees at Keio University. His research fields include solid-state physics, quantum computers, electronic materials, nanotechnology, and semiconductor isotope engineering.

As one of Japan's pioneers in quantum computational research, he has led Keio University into a quantum educational initiative with IBM, alongside the University of Tokyo, University of Chicago, Yonsei University and Seoul National University.

== Work history ==
Below are the Professional Appointments of President's Biography (as of May 28, 2021).

| Apr. 1995–Mar. 1998 | Instructor, Keio University Faculty of Science and Technology |
| Apr. 1998–Mar. 2002 | Assistant Professor, Keio University Faculty of Science and Technology |
| Apr. 2002–Mar. 2007 | Associate Professor, Keio University Faculty of Science and Technology |
| Oct. 2005–Mar. 2010 | Vice Dean, Keio University International Center |
| Apr. 2007–present | Professor, Keio University Faculty of Science and Technology |
| Nov. 2016–Mar. 2017 | Deputy Director, Keio University Global Research Institute (KGRI) |
| Apr. 2017–Mar. 2019 | Dean, Keio University Faculty of Science and Technology and Graduate School of Science and Technology |
| Apr. 2020–May 2021 | Councillor, Keio University Board of Councillors |
| May 2021–Present | President, Keio University (Chair of the Board of Trustees of Keio University and the university president of Keio University) (Until May 27, 2025) |

== Academic appointments ==
- Member of the Executive Committee, Physical Society of Japan (September 2002–August 2004)
- Member of the Governing Board, Institute for Pure and Applied Physics (April 2004–March 2006)
- Director, Japan Society of Applied Physics (March 2016–February 2018)
- Research Supervisor, "Quantum State Control and Functionalization" research area of the Japan Science and Technology Agency's (JST) Precursory Research for Embryonic Science and Technology (PRESTO) Program (April 2016–present)
- Program Director, Quantum Information Technology, Quantum Leap Flagship Program of the Ministry of Education, Culture, Sports, Science and Technology (MEXT Q-LEAP) (April 2018–present)

Academic offices
| Preceded by Akira Haseyama | President of Keio University; May 2021 – | Succeeded by |
