= Akira Hayami =

Japanese demographer

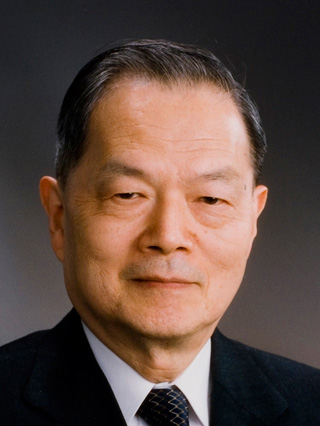

Akira Hayami (速水融; 1929–2019) was an emeritus professor of Keio University and the first to introduce historical demography in Japan. Professor Hayami is also famous for coining the concept called "Industrious Revolution", which points out the socio-economic change from capital-intensive to labor-intensive one.

== Life and career ==
- 1929: Born in Tokyo, Japan
- 1948: Entered The Faculty of Economics, Keio University, Tokyo, Japan
- 1950: Graduated from Keio University
- 1968: Became the professor of economics at Keio University
- 1994: Received Medal of Honor with Purple Ribbon from Japanese government
- 1995: Japan Academy Prize (academics)
- 1991: Emeritus Professor of Keio University
- 2000: Person of Cultural Merit
- 2001: Elected to be a member of Japan Academy
- 2008: elected to be an Honorary Member of French Academy of Sciences
- 2009: Received the Order of Culture from Japanese government
- 2019: Died on December 4

== Industrious Revolution ==
In the 1960s, Hayami generated a household micro-database called Basic Data Sheet (BDS), based on Tokugawa-period religious inquisition registration (宗門改帳). With the help of this database, he analyzed ca. 900 villages in the Nōbi region in central Japan and exploited the following fact. The number of livestock in these villages decreased gradually between the late 17th century and the 19th century, while the population and production increased or remained constant. Hayami also pointed out that people's life expectancy improved during the same time span. These facts imply that the quantity of human labor input without livestock must have increased with aggregate output constant; he named this phenomenon “Industrious Revolution.” In this way, Hayami pioneered research to describe population dynamics before the Industrial Revolution with statistical methods in Japan.
