= Council on Business & Society =

- Abbreviation: CoBS
- Formation: 2012
- Type: NGO
- Location: Global
- Members: ESSEC Business School; FGV-EAESP; School of Management Fudan University; IE Business School; Keio Business School; Trinity Business School; Warwick Business School
- Official language: English
- Website: www.council-business-society.org

The Council on Business & Society (CoBS) is a global alliance open to schools of business and management with a mission to educate tomorrow's responsible leaders and promote sustainable business practices among professionals. It convenes international forums focusing on topics at the crossroads of business and society and the common good that bring together leading academics, students, policy makers, NGOs, international organisations and business leaders. Previous forums have covered the topics of Leadership and Governance, Health and Healthcare, and New Energies. The CoBS also runs a yearly student CSR article writing competition, fosters inter-school faculty exchange and CSR-specific research projects. Other activities and initiatives can be found on the website.

The Council disseminates the CSR and sustainability-centred research of the faculty from its member schools through the following:

- Bi-weekly vulgarised research articles via the Community Blog - A quarterly issue of Global Voice magazine - booklets on specialised CSR-related themes via CoBS Publishing - Condensed research capsules ("Research Pods") with practical insights for practitioners, a series of online Masterclasses, and the Routledge-CoBS Focus on Responsible Business book series.

== Member Schools ==
The Council on Business & Society currently has eleven member schools:

- ESSEC Business School - France (Cergy and Paris-La Défense campuses), Asia-Pacific (Singapore campus) and Africa (Rabat campus);
- FGV-EAESP in Brazil (São Paulo);
- School of Management Fudan University, China (Shanghai);
- IE Business School, Spain (Madrid);
- Keio Business School, Japan (Tokyo);
- Monash Business School, Australia (Melbourne);
- Olin Business School, USA (St. Louis);
- Smith School of Business, Canada (Kingston);
- Stellenbosch Business School, South Africa (Cape Town);
- Trinity College Dublin Business School, Ireland (Dublin);
- and Warwick Business School, UK (Coventry and London).

Together, the schools of the Council on Business & Society are 11 leading international business schools located on 5 continents and in 15 countries, with 21 campuses, 1,777 permanent faculty members, 48,363 students and 482,000 alumni.
