= Yuichi Motai =

Japanese researcher, professor and book author

- Born: Yuichi Motai; Japan
- Education: Purdue University
- Alma mater: Keio University and Kyoto University, Japan

Yuichi Motai is a Japanese researcher, professor, and book author. He serves as director of the Sensory Intelligence Laboratory at Virginia Commonwealth University (VCU) and as an associate professor of Electrical and Computer Engineering. Motai is a past professor at University of Vermont; He was a visiting faculty of Air Force Research Lab at Hanscom MA, and Harvard Medical School, Boston, MA.

Motai received his Ph.D at Purdue University, West Lafayette, Indiana, after completing his MS and BS education in Japan. He is a leader in the fields of Engineering Data. He published four books including Data-variant kernel analysis, published in 2015 by John Wiley & Sons.

== Published works ==
Title(ISBN #)	Publisher(Year)
Prediction and classification of breathing motion (9783642415098)	Springer (2014)
Electromagnetic trackers for augmented reality systems (9781627055079)	ACM Morgan & Claypool (2014)
Data-variant kernel analysis (9781119019329)	John Wiley & Sons (2015)
Predicting vehicle trajectory (9781138030190)	CRC Taylor & Francis (2017)

== Research ==
Motai's papers address fundamental and applied problems of sensory intelligence, which relate to specific application domains such as medical imaging, pattern recognition, computer vision, sensory-based robotic and biomedical applications. The majority of his 39 papers were published in IEEE Transactions, in 1) sensory Intelligence, focused on 2) adaptive prediction and 3) online classification methodologies:

- Sensory Intelligence: Fundamentals of robotic vision and data-intensive computing.
- Adaptive Prediction: Kalman filter bank, Optimized prediction, Time sequences signals.
- Online Classification: Kernel feature analysis, Neural networks, Deep learning.
- Radiation Oncology: Medical imaging, 4D Cone beam computed tomography, 4D MRI.
- Radiology: Computer-Aided Diagnosis, Distributed Database Network, Virtual colonoscopy.

Specific applications such as Radiation Oncology and Radiology were chosen based on his collaborator's expertise.

== Teaching ==
Motai has offered more than 10 different courses. The 4 fields he teaches in are Pattern Recognition, Automatic Control, Dynamic and Multivariable Systems, Signals and Systems I

Motai also taught at the University of Vermont, offering classes in the fields of Sensory-based robotics, Computer vision, and Ubiquitous computing.

== Personal life ==
Motai has two children, Yamato and Yurika.

== See also ==
- Robotics
- Machine Learning
- Data Science
- Medical Imaging
