= Keio–Waseda rivalry =

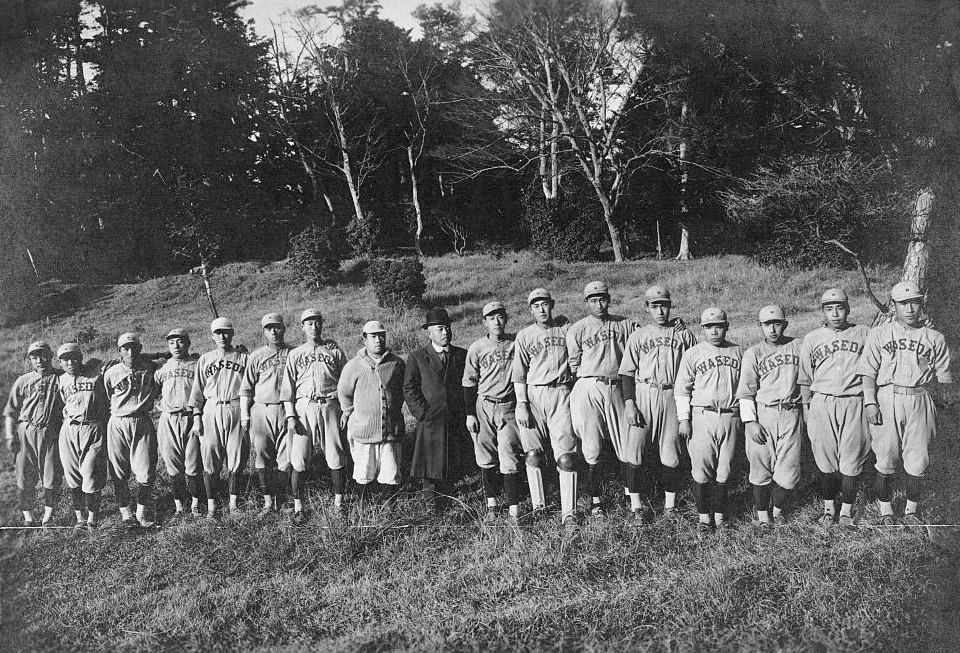
Waseda Univ. baseball team 1911

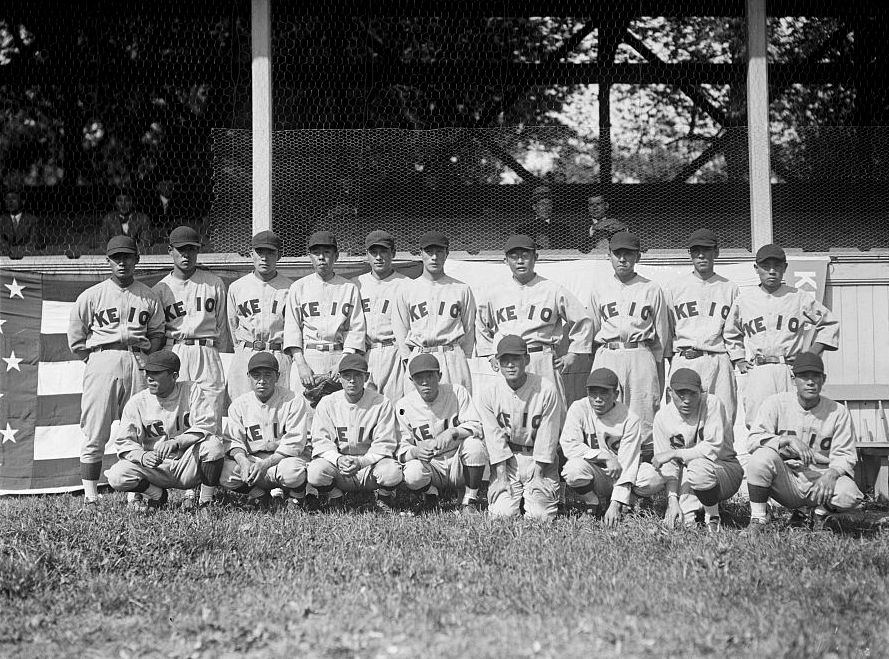
Keio Univ. baseball team 1928–1929

The Waseda–Keio rivalry (Japanese: 早慶戦, Hepburn: Sōkeisen), also known as the Keio–Waseda rivalry, is a rivalry between two universities located in Tokyo, Japan: Waseda University and Keio University. Waseda University also has a close relationship with Meiji University, and the sports competition between these two universities is known as Sōmeisen. Waseda and Keio are regarded as the most prestigious private universities in Japan. The rivalry dates back to the introduction of baseball in Japan during the Meiji period (1868–1912). In Keio University, it is called Keisōsen, too. In the 20th century, the Waseda–Keio rivalry served as a model for the Korea University–Yonsei University rivalry.
