= Industrious Revolution =

Period in European history (1600–1800)

The Industrious Revolution was a period in early modern Europe lasting from approximately 1600 to 1800 in which household productivity and consumer demand increased despite the absence of major technological innovations that would mark the later Industrial Revolution. Proponents of the Industrious Revolution theory argue that the increase in working hours and individual consumption traditionally associated with the Industrial Revolution actually began several centuries earlier, and were largely a result of choice rather than coercion. The term was originally coined by the Japanese demographic historian Akira Hayami to describe Japan during the Tokugawa era. The theory of a pre–industrial Industrious Revolution is contested by some historians.

== Origin ==
Hayami introduced the concept of Industrious Revolution in a Japanese-language work published in 1967. It was coined to compare the labour-intensive technologies of Tokugawa Japan (1603–1868) with the capital-intensive technologies of Britain's Industrial Revolution. Hayami observed that the two countries took different paths due to the different mix of factor endowments (capital for Britain and labour for Japan). He introduced the idea of an "Industrious Revolution" to describe the Japanese developmental trajectory, which exploited the benefits of increasing labour absorption due to the lack of capital that made the Industrial Revolution in Britain possible.

== Industrious vs. Industrial Revolution ==
The basic picture painted of the pre–Industrial Revolution is that the Industrial Revolution was the result of a surplus of money and crops, which led to the development of new technology. The 1500s (16th century) saw the revolution of print, which boosted education and knowledge sharing among locations, and which was an automation-revolution, based on transmissions, albeit not-yet motorized. This new technology eventually developed into factories. The Industrious Revolution addresses this belief, saying instead, that the overwhelming desire for more goods directly preceded the Industrial Revolution. The theory states that during the Industrious Revolution there was an increase in demand for goods, but that supply did not rise as quickly.

Eventually, some achievements of industry and agriculture, as well as the decisions made by households, helped to increase the supply, as well as the demand for goods. These behaviours, when combined constitute an Industrious Revolution. A quick summation of the differences between the Industrious Revolution and the Industrial Revolution is that the former is concerned with demand, and the latter is supply based. The right mindset to a productional economy and world may have increased the supply of technology, but they would have had little impact on invention without a demand for new techniques.

The theory of an Industrious Revolution, as put forward by historian Jan de Vries, claims that there were two parts to the Industrious Revolution. First, there was a reduction of leisure time as the utility of monetary income rose. Second, the focus of labour shifted from goods and services to marketable goods.

In a later work, Hayami cited that De Vries and other theorists' interpretations did not use the term in the same way he does. Hayami noted that these saw Industrious Revolution and Industrial Revolution as a continuum while the original idea considers the two revolutions as opposing concepts. Hayami also stressed that the term explained how the Japanese became industrious for some reason at one point and that eventually they will no longer be.

== The length of the historical working year ==
One of the suggested hallmarks of an Industrious Revolution is that of increased work days. However, according to historians Gregory Clark and Ysbrand Van Der Werf, there has been no information found to suggest an increase in work days, in the time period between the Middle Ages and the nineteenth century. These records even indicate that before 1750, some people were working 300 days per year. Even in the period preceding the Industrial Revolution people were working at least 290 days in a year. In contrast, other estimates found an average of 250-260 working days a year for labourers in fifteenth-century Europe, lower than at any subsequent point until the second half of the twentieth century.

Clark and Van Der Werf have also examined the output of a couple of English industries. For one, they looked at records of the saw mills in England. Between 1300 and 1800, the period directly preceding and following the proposed Industrious Revolution, the estimated amount of lumber sawed increased about eighty percent. However, this increase in lumber sawed can be attributed to new technologies, and not in fact the influence of an Industrious Revolution. In contrast, they mention the threshing industry. Unlike the lumber sawing business, this industry shows "clear downward movement" in threshing rates, after which there are no longer any trends. This information would help to disprove the idea of an Industrious Revolution, since, as it has been put forth, there is no universal trend displaying an increase of work habits.

While direct information on the number of days worked per year in pre modern times is scant, indirect estimates of annual labour inputs support the idea of increased industriousness in England. Robert Allen and Jacob Weisdorf inferred the length of the historical working year by dividing the costs of supporting an average family by the daily wage rate at the time. Their exercise suggests that the early modern working year grew longer both in rural and urban areas. In rural areas, however, increased industriousness resulted from workers' attempts to maintain their standards of living in the face of falling real wages. This does not support the hypothesis that industriousness served to increase the demand for goods. In urban areas, on the other hand, where real wages were rising and the working days required to support a family declined, the gap between the observed working year and the work needed to cover basic family expenses grew wider. This supports the idea that labour inputs and therefore workers' earnings rose relative to what was required for basic subsistence.

Using an estimation strategy based on labour market arbitrage originally proposed by Clark and Van der Werf, a later study by Jane Humphries and Jacob Weisdorf shows similar rising trends in early modern labour inputs. The approach implies that day rates in combination with annual rates facilitate the computation of the working year needed in day labour in order to obtain the income that could be earned by annual employees. The method suggests that labour input per year in England grew more than two-fold, from less than 150 days during the medieval period to well over 300 days during the Industrial Revolution.

However the authors abstain from endorsing the aforementioned theory that this was caused by a voluntary desire to buy more goods, suggesting structural changes in employment (on annual vs. daily basis), demise of alternatives to wage labour (payment in kind and/or boarding), rising number of dependants to support and shifts in bargaining power as possible alternative explanations.

== Production of goods ==
Prior to the proposed era of the Industrious Revolution most goods were produced either by household or by guilds. There were many households involved in the production of marketable goods. Most of what was produced by these households were things that involved cloth- textiles, clothing, as well as art, and tapestries. These would be produced by the households, or by their respective guilds. It was even possible for guilds and merchants to outsource into more rural areas, to get some of the work done. These merchants would bring the raw materials to the workers, who would then, using the supplied materials, make the goods. For example, young girls would be hired to make silk, because they were the only people believed to have hands dexterous enough to make the silk properly. Other occupations such as knitting, a job that was never organized into guilds, could easily be done within the household.

The income of the household became dependent upon the quality and the quantity of everyone's work. Even if people were not working for an individual guild they could still supply and make items not controlled by the guilds. These would be small, but necessary items like wooden dishes, or soaps. So, basically, much of production was done by, or for, guilds. This would indicate that much of what was done was not done for one individual household, but for a larger group or organization.

During the Industrious Revolution, the everyday goods and products used by the household shifted from mostly homemade, to mostly "commercially produced goods". At the same time, the women became more than likely to hold jobs outside of the household. This is also seen within the context of the Industrial Revolution, where women would often find small jobs to help supplement their husband's wages.
