= Takao Suzuki (sociolinguist) =

Japanese sociolinguist (1926–2021)

Takao Suzuki (鈴木 孝夫, Suzuki Takao; Tokyo, 9 November 1926 – 10 February 2021) was a Japanese sociolinguist, He was the author of ことばと文化, translated into English as Words in Context.

Suzuki argued that:

- Sociolinguists do not pay enough attention to the subtle differences between word usage in different cultures.
- Japanese linguists have traditionally been too occupied with Western linguistic categories, which are less than effective in studying Japanese.

== Bibliography ==
- (translated in English)
  - Words in Context (ことばと文化, 1973) published in English as “Japanese and the Japanese: Words in Culture” first edition 1978
- (not translated in English, literal titles)
  - 閉された言語・日本語の世界 (A Closed Language – The World of Japanese, 1975)
  - 日本語と外国語 (The Japanese Language and Foreign Languages, 1990)
  - 日本語は国際語になりうるか (Can Japanese Become An International Language?, 1995)
  - 教養としての言語学 (Educational Linguistics, 1996)
  - 日本人はなぜ英語ができないか (Why Japanese Are Bad at English, 1999)
  - 人にはどれだけの物が必要か (How Many Things Does A Man Need?, 1999)
  - 英語はいらない？ (No Need For English?, 2000)
  - 日本・日本語・日本人 (Japan, Its Language and the People, 2001)
  - 日本人はなぜ日本を愛せないのか (Why Japanese Cannot Be Patriotic, 2005)
- (English works)
  - A semantic analysis of present-day Japanese with particular reference to the role of Chinese characters (1963)
  - Reflections on Japanese language and culture (1987)
