= Hiyoshi =

Human settlement in Japan

Coordinates: 35°33′26.7″N 139°38′49.6″E

Hiyoshi (日吉) is a part of the city of Yokohama, Kanagawa Prefecture, Japan. It is located within Kōhoku Ward in the northeast of Yokohama City.

== Overview ==
It is served by Hiyoshi Station on the Tōkyū Tōyoko Line and Yokohama Subway. It is approximately 22 minutes by train from Shibuya, and 15 minutes from Yokohama, being located between Moto-Sumiyoshi on the north and Tsunashima on the south. Limited Express services do not stop at Hiyoshi, however, Express and Commuter Limited Express services do.

Hiyoshi is the home of Keio University's Hiyoshi campus, Yagami campus and Keio Business School. The main part of Hiyoshi Campus is located directly to the right of the station exit across Tsunashima Kaidō. The campus sprawls over a low hill and is most remarkable for the many tall trees growing there. Yagami campus, located only a short walk from Hiyoshi campus, holds the faculty of Science and Technology.

The town shopping district is on the opposite side of the station, the west side. The town's main thoroughfares run out from the station's Nishiguchi Square like the spokes of a wheel, though the direction of traffic is generally toward the station. Sun Road runs north (traffic south). Hamagin Dōri runs northwest. Chūō Dōri runs out to the west (traffic east). Futsubu Dōri comes in toward the station from the southwest.

== Education ==
The Yokohama Municipal Board of Education operates public elementary and junior high schools.

Hiyoshi 2-chome and parts of 1 and 3-4 chome are zoned to Hiyoshidai Elementary School (日吉台小学校). Parts of 5 and 7-chome are zoned to Minowa Elementary School (箕輪小学校). Parts of 3-7-chome are zoned to Yagami Elementary School (矢上小学校). 6-chome 14-ban is zoned to Tsunashimahigashi Elementary School (綱島東小学校). Parts of 1-chome are zoned to Shimoda Elementary School (下田小学校). Hiyoshidai, Minowa, and Yagami feed into Hiyoshidai Junior High School (日吉台中学校), and 6-14 Hiyoshi is also zoned to Hiyoshidai JHS. Shimoda feeds into Hiyoshidai Nishi (West) Junior High School (日吉台西中学校).

== See also ==
- Keio University
