= 2012 Liberal Democratic Party presidential election =

Political leadership election in Japan

- 26 September 2012
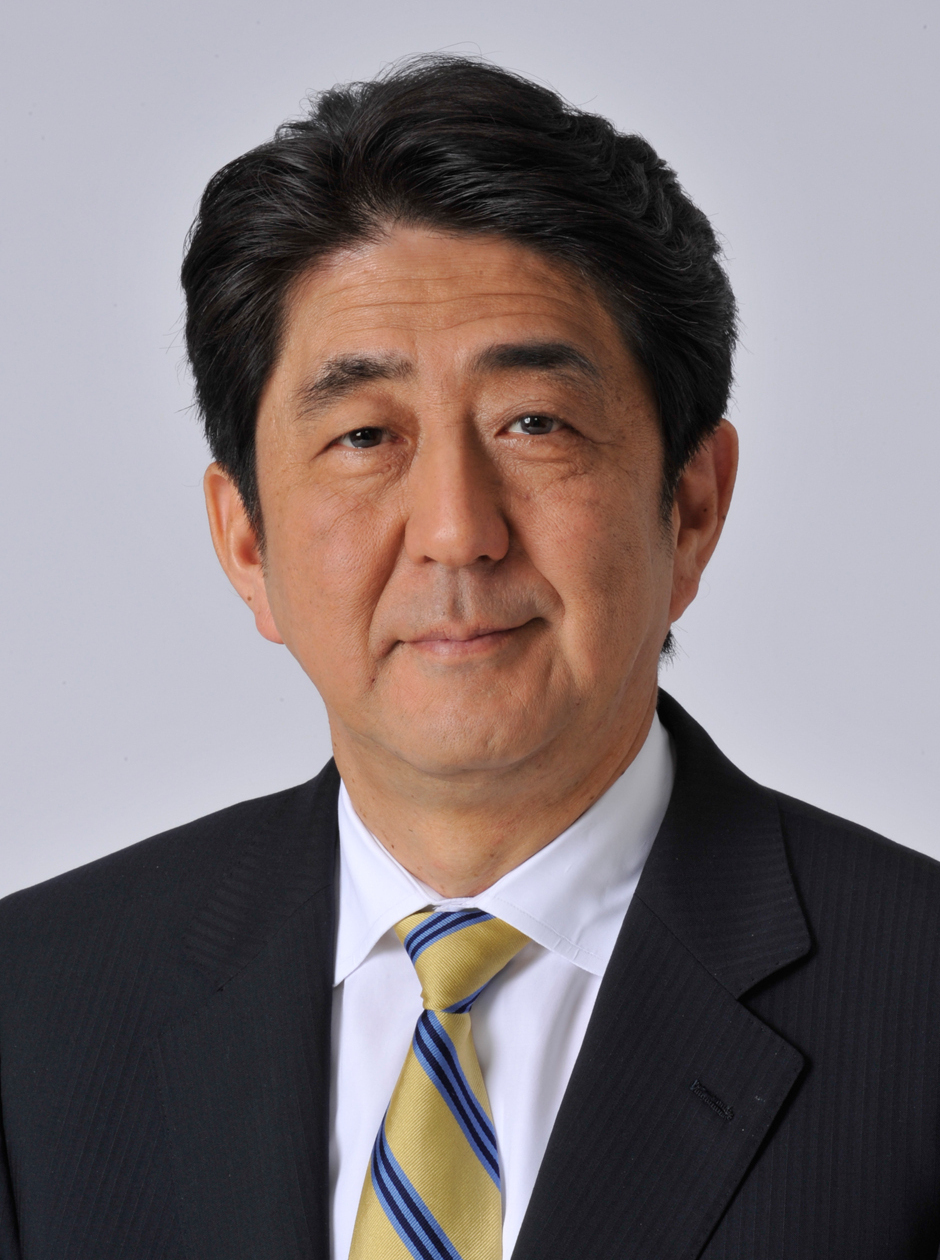

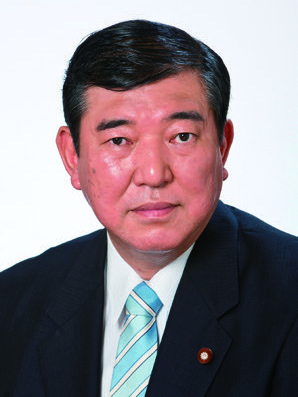

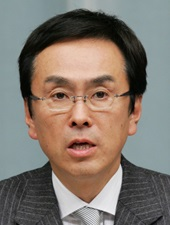
Candidate	Shinzo Abe	Shigeru Ishiba	Nobuteru Ishihara
Leader's seat	Yamaguchi 4th	Tottori 1st	Tokyo 8th
First round	141 (28.37%)	199 (40.04%)	96 (19.32%)
Runoff vote	108 (54.82%)	89 (45.18%)	Eliminated
President before election
Sadakazu Tanigaki
Elected President
Shinzo Abe

A presidential election was held on 26 September 2012 to elect the next president of the Liberal Democratic Party for a new 3-year term.

== Background ==
The leadership election was held on September 26, 2012, when Sadakazu Tanigaki's term of office expired. Three years after last general election, support for the ruling Democratic Party had been weak, and this election had attracted a lot of attention as it was expected to change power in the upcoming general election.

== Candidates ==
At first, it seemed to be a battle centered on the incumbent Tanigaki who showed strong desire for re-election, but as mentioned earlier, it became a presidential election to elect a leading candidate for "next prime minister," so many lawmakers showed their willingness. It was described as a different aspect from the previous factional elections, and "the decline in the power of factions was highlighted".

=== Declared ===
Candidate(s)	Date of birth	Current position	Party faction	Electoral district
Shinzo Abe	21 September 1954 (age 58)	Member of the House of Representatives (since 1993) Previous offices held: Prime Minister (2006–2007); President of the Liberal Democratic Party (2006–2007); Chief Cabinet Secretary (2005–2006)	Seiwa Seisaku Kenkyūkai (Machimura)	Yamaguchi 4th
Shigeru Ishiba	4 February 1957 (age 55)	Member of the House of Representatives (since 1986) Previous offices held: Chairman of the Liberal Democratic Party Policy Research Council (2009–2011); Minister of Agriculture, Forestry and Fisheries (2008–2009); Minister of Defense (2007–2008)	None	Tottori 1st
Nobuteru Ishihara	17 April 1957 (age 55)	Secretary-General of the Liberal Democratic Party (since 2010); Member of the House of Representatives (since 1990) Previous offices held: Minister of Land, Infrastructure, Transport and Tourism (2003–2004); Minister for Regulatory Reform (2001–2003)	Kinmirai Seiji Kenkyūkai (Yamasaki)	Tokyo 8th
Nobutaka Machimura	17 October 1944 (age 67)	Member of the House of Representatives (since 1983) Previous offices held: Chief Cabinet Secretary (2007–2008); Minister for Foreign Affairs (2004–2005, 2007)	Seiwa Seisaku Kenkyūkai (Machimura)	Hokkaido 5th
Yoshimasa Hayashi	19 January 1961 (age 51)	Member of the House of Councillors (since 1995) Previous offices held: Minister State for Economic and Fiscal Policy (2009); Minister of Defense (2008)	Kōchikai (Koga)	Yamaguchi at-large

=== Withdrawn ===
Candidate(s)	Date of birth	Current positions	Party faction	Electoral District
Sadakazu Tanigaki	7 March 1945 (age 67)	President of the Liberal Democratic Party (since 2009); Member of the House of Representatives (since 1983) Other offices: Minister of Land, Infrastructure, Transport and Tourism (2008); Minister of Finance (2003–2006); Chairperson of the National Public Safety Commission (2002–2003)	Kōchikai (Koga)	Kyoto 5th

== Supporters ==
=== Recommenders ===
Party regulations require candidates to have the written support at least 20 Diet members, known as recommenders, to run.

Shinzo Abe

Leader of recommenders

- Hakubun Shimomura (Member of the House of Representatives for Tokyo 11th district) (Seiwakai)

Campaign Manager

- Akira Amari (Member of the House of Representatives for Southern Kanto PR block) (Kinmirai Seiji Kenkyūkai)

Recommenders

- Kenya Akiba (Member of the House of Representatives for Tohoku PR block) (no faction)
- Tomomi Inada (Member of the House of Representatives for Fukui 1st district) (Seiwakai)
- Masahiro Imamura (Member of the House of Representatives for Kyushu PR block) (no faction)
- Taku Eto (Member of the House of Representatives for Miyazaki 2nd district) (no faction)
- Katsunobu Katō (Member of the House of Representatives for Okayama 5th district) (Heiseiken)
- Katsuyuki Kawai (Member of the House of Representatives for Chūgoku PR block) (no faction)
- Minoru Kiuchi (Member of the House of Representatives for Shizuoka 7th district) (no faction)
- Genichiro Sata (Member of the House of Representatives for Northern Kanto PR block) (Heiseiken)
- Masahiko Shibayama (Member of the House of Representatives for Northern Kanto PR block) (Seiwakai)
- Yoshitaka Shindō (Member of the House of Representatives for Northern Kanto PR block) (Heiseiken)
- Sanae Takaichi (Member of the House of Representatives for Kinki PR block) (no faction)
- Keiji Furuya (Member of the House of Representatives for Tōkai PR block) (Shisuikai)
- Haruko Arimura (Member of the House of Councillors from National PR block) (Banchōken)
- Yōsuke Isozaki (Member of the House of Councillors from Ōita) (Seiwakai)
- Hiroshige Sekō (Member of the House of Councillors from Wakayama) (Seiwakai)
- Ichiro Tsukada (Member of the House of Councillors from Niigata) (Ikōkai)
- Shoji Nishida (Member of the House of Councillors from Kyoto) (Seiwakai)
- Shinpei Matsushita (Member of the House of Councillors from Miyazaki) (no faction)
Shigeru Ishiba

Leader of recommenders

- Ichirō Kamoshita (Member of the House of Representatives for Tokyo PR block) (no faction)

Campaign Manager

- Hiroshi Kajiyama (Member of the House of Representatives for Ibaraki 4th district) (no faction)

Recommenders

- Masatoshi Ishida (Member of the House of Representatives for Kinki PR block) (Kinmirai Seiji Kenkyūkai)
- Masazumi Gotoda (Member of the House of Representatives for Tokushima 3rd district) (no faction)
- Ken Saitō (Member of the House of Representatives for Southern Kanto PR block) (no faction)
- Norihisa Tamura (Member of the House of Representatives for Tōkai PR block) (Heiseiken)
- Masaaki Taira (Member of the House of Representatives for Tokyo PR block) (no faction)
- Naokazu Takemoto (Member of the House of Representatives for Kinki PR block) (Kōchikai)
- Keiichiro Tachibana (Member of the House of Representatives for Toyama 3rd district) (no faction)
- Koichi Tani (Member of the House of Representatives for Kinki PR block) (Shisuikai)
- Gen Nakatani (Member of the House of Representatives for Kōchi 2nd district) (Kōchikai)
- Keiko Nagaoka (Member of the House of Representatives for Northern Kanto PR block) (Ikōkai)
- Shunichi Yamaguchi (Member of the House of Representatives for Shikoku PR block) (Ikōkai)
- Taku Yamamoto (Member of the House of Representatives for Fukui 2nd district) (no faction)
- Hiroo Ishii (Member of the House of Councillors from Akita) (Heiseiken)
- Satsuki Katayama (Member of the House of Councillors from National PR block) (Shisuikai)
- Kenji Kosaka (Member of the House of Councillors from National PR block) (no faction)
- Masahisa Sato (Member of the House of Councillors from National PR block) (Heiseiken)
- Yūsuke Nakanishi (Member of the House of Councillors from Tokushima) (Ikōkai)
- Junko Mihara (Member of the House of Councillors from National PR block) (no faction)
Nobuteru Ishihara

Leader of recommenders

- Ryotaro Tanose (Member of the House of Representatives for Nara 4th district) (Kinmirai Seiji Kenkyūkai)

Campaign Manager

- Toshimitsu Motegi (Member of the House of Representatives for Tochigi 5th district) (Heiseiken)

Recommenders

- Shinji Inoue (Member of the House of Representatives for Tokyo 25th district) (Ikōkai)
- Itsunori Onodera (Member of the House of Representatives for Miyagi 6th district) (Kōchikai)
- Yūko Obuchi (Member of the House of Representatives for Gunma 5th district) (Heiseiken)
- Kazuyoshi Kaneko (Member of the House of Representatives for Gifu 4th district) (Kōchikai)
- Fumio Kishida (Member of the House of Representatives for Hiroshima 1st district) (Kōchikai)
- Tetsushi Sakamoto (Member of the House of Representatives for Kumamoto 3rd district) (Kinmirai Seiji Kenkyūkai)
- Isshu Sugawara (Member of the House of Representatives for Tokyo PR block) (no faction)
- Wataru Takeshita (Member of the House of Representatives for Shimane 2nd district) (Heiseiken)
- Akira Nishino (Member of the House of Representatives for Osaka 13th district) (Kōchikai)
- Takeshi Noda (Member of the House of Representatives for Kyushu PR block) (Kinmirai Seiji Kenkyūkai)
- Motoo Hayashi (Member of the House of Representatives for Southern Kanto PR block) (Kinmirai Seiji Kenkyūkai)
- Katsuei Hirasawa (Member of the House of Representatives for Tokyo 17th district) (Kinmirai Seiji Kenkyūkai)
- Midori Ishii (Member of the House of Councillors from National PR block) (Heiseiken)
- Masaharu Nakagawa (Member of the House of Councillors from Tokyo) (Seiwakai)
- Hirohiko Nakamura (Member of the House of Councillors from National PR block) (Seiwakai)
- Tetsuro Nomura (Member of the House of Councillors from Kagoshima) (Heiseiken)
- Hiromi Yoshida (Member of the House of Councillors from Nagano) (Heiseiken)
- Masashi Waki (Member of the House of Councillors from National PR block) (Heiseiken)
Nobutaka Machimura

Leader of recommenders

- Seiko Hashimoto (Member of the House of Councillors from National PR block) (Seiwakai)

Campaign Manager

- Hiroyuki Hosoda (Member of the House of Representatives for Shimane 1st district) (Seiwakai)

Recommenders

- Tarō Kimura (Member of the House of Representatives for Aomori 4th district) (Seiwakai)
- Shigeo Kitamura (Member of the House of Representatives for Hokuriku-Shin'etsu PR block) (Seiwakai)
- Ryū Shionoya (Member of the House of Representatives for Tōkai PR block) (Seiwakai)
- Tsuyoshi Takagi (Member of the House of Representatives for Fukui 3rd district) (Seiwakai)
- Tsutomu Takebe (Member of the House of Representatives for Hokkaido PR block) (Kinmirai Seiji Kenkyūkai)
- Yaichi Tanigawa (Member of the House of Representatives for Kyushu PR block) (Seiwakai)
- Hiroshi Hase (Member of the House of Representatives for Hokuriku-Shin'etsu PR block) (Seiwakai)
- Hirokazu Matsuno (Member of the House of Representatives for Southern Kanto PR block) (Seiwakai)
- Mitsuhide Iwaki (Member of the House of Councillors from Fukushima) (Seiwakai)
- Naoki Okada (Member of the House of Councillors from Ishikawa) (Seiwakai)
- Yoriko Kawaguchi (Member of the House of Councillors from National PR block) (no faction)
- Seiji Suzuki (Member of the House of Councillors from Aichi) (Seiwakai)
- Chūichi Date (Member of the House of Councillors from Hokkaido) (Seiwakai)
- Gaku Hasegawa (Member of the House of Councillors from Hokkaido) (Seiwakai)
- Masako Mori (Member of the House of Councillors from Fukushima) (Seiwakai)
- Masaaki Yamazaki (Member of the House of Councillors from Fukui) (Seiwakai)
- Junzo Yamamoto (Member of the House of Councillors from Ehime) (Seiwakai)
- Kenta Wakabayashi (Member of the House of Councillors from Nagano) (Seiwakai)
Yoshimasa Hayashi

Leader of recommenders

- Koichi Kishi (Member of the House of Councillors from Yamagata) (Kōchikai)

Campaign Manager

- Yoichi Miyazawa (Member of the House of Councillors from Hiroshima) (Kōchikai)

Recommenders

- Yasushi Kaneko (Member of the House of Representatives for Kumamoto 5th district) (no faction)
- Seigo Kitamura (Member of the House of Representatives for Kyushu PR block) (Kōchikai)
- Takuya Hirai (Member of the House of Representatives for Shikoku PR block) (Kōchikai)
- Teru Fukui (Member of the House of Representatives for Kōchi 1st district) (Kōchikai)
- Norio Mitsuya (Member of the House of Representatives for Mie 5th district) (Kōchikai)
- Mitsuhiro Miyakoshi (Member of the House of Representatives for Toyama 2nd district) (Kōchikai)
- Yoshio Mochizuki (Member of the House of Representatives for Tōkai PR block) (Kōchikai)
- Kozo Yamamoto (Member of the House of Representatives for Kyushu PR block) (Kōchikai)
- Jiro Aichi (Member of the House of Councillors from Miyagi) (no faction)
- Yoshihiko Isozaki (Member of the House of Councillors from Kagawa) (Kōchikai)
- Kuniko Inoguchi (Member of the House of Councillors from Chiba) (no faction)
- Yoshito Kajiya (Member of the House of Councillors from Kagoshima) (Kōchikai)
- Genjiro Kaneko (Member of the House of Councillors from Nagasaki) (Kōchikai)
- Yutaka Kumagai (Member of the House of Councillors from Miyagi) (no faction)
- Yōsuke Tsuruho (Member of the House of Councillors from Wakayama) (Shisuikai)
- Motoyuki Fujii (Member of the House of Councillors from National PR block) (Kōchikai)
- Masaji Matsuyama (Member of the House of Councillors from Fukuoka) (Kōchikai)
- Toshiei Mizuochi (Member of the House of Councillors from National PR block) (Kōchikai)

Number of recommenders by factions

Candidates	Shinzo Abe	Shigeru Ishiba	Nobuteru Ishihara	Nobutaka Machimura	Yoshimasa Hayashi
Banchō Seisaku Kenkyūjo	1	0	0	0	0
Heisei Kenkyūkai	3	3	7	0	0
Ikōkai	1	3	1	0	0
Kinmirai Seiji Kenkyūkai	1	1	5	1	0
Kōchikai	0	2	4	0	15
Seiwa Seisaku Kenkyūkai	6	0	2	18	0
Shisuikai	1	2	0	0	1
No faction	7	9	1	1	4

== Results ==
Full result
Candidate	1st Round								2nd Round	
Candidate	Diet members		Party members				Total		Diet members	
Candidate	Votes	%	Popular votes	%	Allocated votes	%	Votes	%	Votes	%
Shinzo Abe 当	54	27.41%	140,668	28.63%	87	29.00%	141	28.37%	108	54.82%
Shigeru Ishiba	34	17.26%	233,376	47.50%	165	55.00%	199	40.04%	89	45.18%
Nobuteru Ishihara	58	29.44%	74,552	15.17%	38	12.67%	96	19.32%	Eliminated	
Nobutaka Machimura	27	13.71%	26,463	5.39%	7	2.33%	34	6.84%	Eliminated	
Yoshimasa Hayashi	24	12.18%	16,246	3.31%	3	1.00%	27	5.43%	Eliminated	
Total	197	100.00%	491,305	100.00%	300	100.00%	497	100.00%	197	100.00%
Valid votes	197	99.49%	491,305	99.57%	300	100.00%	497	99.80%	197	99.49%
Invalid and blank votes	1	0.51%	2,133	0.43%	0	0.00%	1	0.20%	1	0.51%
Turnout	198	100.00%	493,438	62.51%	300	100.00%	498	100.00%	198	100.00%
Registered voters	198	100.00%	789,348	100.00%	300	100.00%	498	100.00%	198	100.00%

Ishiba overtook the other candidates to take first place, but failed to win a majority of the votes and ended up in a runoff vote with Abe, the runner-up. As a result of the runoff vote, Abe reversed Ishiba and was elected.

=== Results of Party Members' Votes by Prefectures (First Round) ===
Results of Party Members' Votes by Prefectures
Prefectures	Shigeru Ishiba			Shinzo Abe			Nobuteru Ishihara			Nobutaka Machimura			Yoshimasa Hayashi		
Prefectures	Votes	%		Votes	%		Votes	%		Votes	%		Votes	%	
Aichi	10,210	51.6%	5	6,056	30.6%	3	2,299	11.6%	1	883	4.4%	0	353	1.8%	0
Akita	2,638	57.7%	3	917	20.0%	1	711	15.5%	0	237	5.2%	0	73	1.6%	0
Aomori	2,911	47.9%	3	1,094	18.0%	1	1,235	20.3%	1	719	11.8%	0	118	2.0%	0
Chiba	5,773	51.0%	4	2,806	24.8%	2	1,801	15.9%	1	745	6.6%	0	199	1.7%	0
Ehime	5,657	45.4%	4	4,995	40.0%	3	1,248	10.0%	0	388	3.1%	0	185	1.5%	0
Fukui	2,485	42.2%	2	2,627	44.6%	3	335	5.7%	0	392	6.7%	0	48	0.8%	0
Fukuoka	3,416	33.0%	2	4,555	44.0%	3	1,515	14.6%	1	197	1.9%	0	673	6.5%	0
Fukushima	3,970	54.6%	4	1,058	14.5%	1	869	11.9%	0	1,282	17.6%	1	100	1.4%	0
Gifu	9,339	41.9%	5	6,885	30.9%	3	5,163	23.2%	2	655	2.9%	0	250	1.1%	0
Gunma	6,774	55.9%	5	2,224	18.3%	1	2,575	21.2%	1	397	3.3%	0	161	1.3%	0
Hiroshima	5,692	37.4%	3	5,361	35.2%	3	3,006	19.8%	2	197	1.3%	0	959	6.3%	0
Hokkaido	6,219	34.4%	3	3,707	20.5%	2	1,094	6.1%	0	6,890	38.1%	4	167	0.9%	0
Hyōgo	5,446	53.2%	4	3,577	35.0%	2	778	7.6%	0	272	2.7%	0	158	1.5%	0
Ibaraki	15,169	73.6%	8	1,944	9.4%	1	2,923	14.2%	1	341	1.7%	0	224	1.1%	0
Ishikawa	4,535	36.3%	3	3,394	27.2%	2	2,371	19.0%	1	1,940	15.5%	1	250	2.0%	0
Iwate	1,045	41.6%	2	448	17.8%	1	738	29.3%	1	207	8.2%	0	77	3.1%	0
Kagawa	4,077	41.5%	3	2,584	26.3%	1	1,545	15.8%	1	233	2.4%	0	1,378	14.0%	1
Kagoshima	2,997	36.3%	3	1,891	22.9%	1	2,726	33.0%	2	238	2.9%	0	400	4.9%	0
Kanagawa	11,093	48.5%	5	8,774	38.4%	4	2,177	9.5%	1	515	2.2%	0	315	1.4%	0
Kōchi	3,676	84.8%	4	456	10.5%	0	94	2.2%	0	40	0.9%	0	70	1.6%	0
Kumamoto	4,414	43.7%	3	2,496	24.7%	2	2,422	24.0%	2	150	1.5%	0	614	6.1%	0
Kyoto	3,180	48.4%	3	2,425	36.9%	2	680	10.4%	0	147	2.2%	0	138	2.1%	0
Mie	3,391	67.5%	4	981	19.5%	1	405	8.1%	0	94	1.9%	0	152	3.0%	0
Miyagi	2,371	44.7%	2	1,661	31.3%	2	799	15.1%	1	305	5.8%	0	166	3.1%	0
Miyazaki	3,423	49.6%	4	2,522	36.6%	2	768	11.1%	0	96	1.4%	0	91	1.3%	0
Nagano	3,979	60.8%	3	1,118	17.1%	1	1,003	15.3%	1	352	5.4%	0	88	1.4%	0
Nagasaki	3,940	40.3%	3	3,105	31.8%	3	1,070	10.9%	1	729	7.5%	0	932	9.5%	0
Nara	1,129	29.0%	1	1,506	38.7%	2	1,146	29.4%	1	71	1.8%	0	41	1.1%	0
Niigata	6,118	44.8%	4	5,671	41.6%	3	1,205	8.8%	0	425	3.1%	0	227	1.7%	0
Ōita	2,516	35.4%	2	2,756	38.7%	2	537	7.5%	0	1,161	16.3%	1	146	2.1%	0
Okayama	4,149	47.4%	3	3,436	39.3%	3	712	8.1%	0	271	3.1%	0	183	2.1%	0
Okinawa	1,107	60.5%	3	204	11.1%	0	327	17.9%	1	140	7.6%	0	53	2.9%	0
Osaka	8,321	46.7%	4	6,917	38.8%	4	1,962	11.0%	1	353	2.0%	0	276	1.5%	0
Saga	2,137	45.8%	2	1,477	31.6%	1	792	17.0%	1	106	2.3%	0	155	3.3%	0
Saitama	7,099	52.1%	5	3,714	27.3%	2	1,797	13.2%	1	707	5.2%	0	307	2.2%	0
Shiga	2,687	49.2%	3	1,490	27.3%	1	1,075	19.7%	1	123	2.2%	0	88	1.6%	0
Shimane	4,292	45.2%	3	1,138	12.0%	1	3,205	33.8%	2	768	8.1%	0	91	0.9%	0
Shizuoka	8,474	50.3%	5	5,017	29.8%	2	1,997	11.9%	1	792	4.7%	0	551	3.3%	0
Tochigi	3,756	48.5%	3	1,370	17.7%	1	2,295	29.7%	1	166	2.1%	0	152	2.0%	0
Tokushima	2,565	84.8%	4	299	9.9%	0	131	4.3%	0	17	0.6%	0	13	0.4%	0
Tokyo	18,775	46.6%	8	9,008	22.3%	4	10,189	25.3%	4	1,385	3.4%	0	950	2.4%	0
Tottori	6,334	96.4%	5	184	2.8%	0	28	0.4%	0	13	0.2%	0	10	0.2%	0
Toyama	8,693	52.5%	5	4,179	25.2%	2	2,067	12.5%	1	985	6.0%	0	635	3.8%	0
Wakayama	1,376	24.9%	1	2,976	53.8%	3	902	16.3%	1	58	1.1%	0	218	3.9%	0
Yamagata	3,681	68.8%	5	645	12.1%	0	652	12.2%	0	117	2.2%	0	253	4.7%	0
Yamaguchi	550	4.9%	0	8,164	72.1%	5	85	0.7%	0	35	0.3%	0	2,489	22.0%	1
Yamanashi	1,797	36.3%	2	856	17.3%	0	1,098	22.2%	1	129	2.6%	0	1,069	21.6%	1
Total	233,376	47.5%	165	140,668	28.6%	87	74,552	15.2%	38	26,463	5.4%	7	16,246	3.3%	3
