= 2020 Liberal Democratic Party presidential election =

Political party leadership election

- 14 September 2020
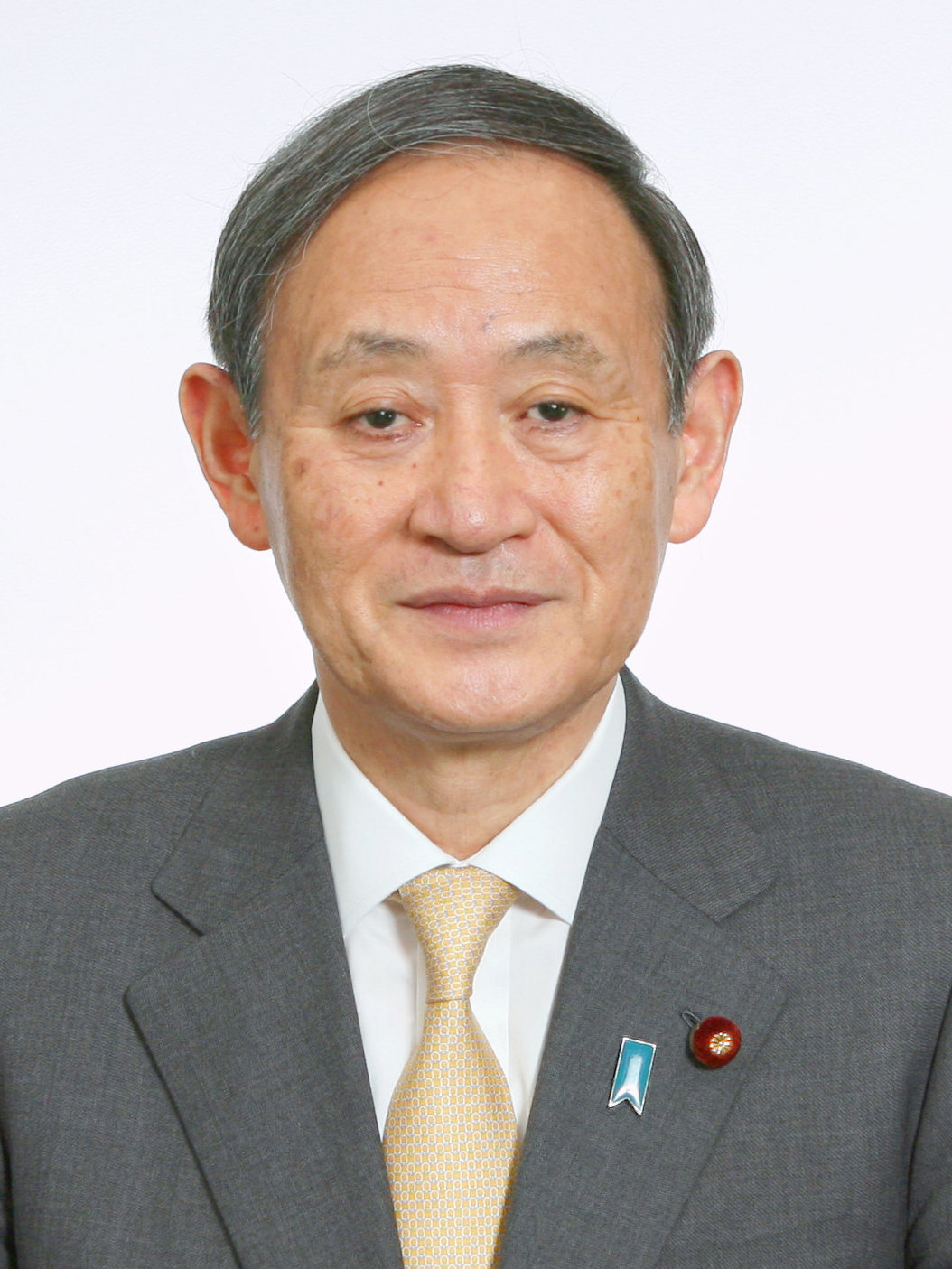

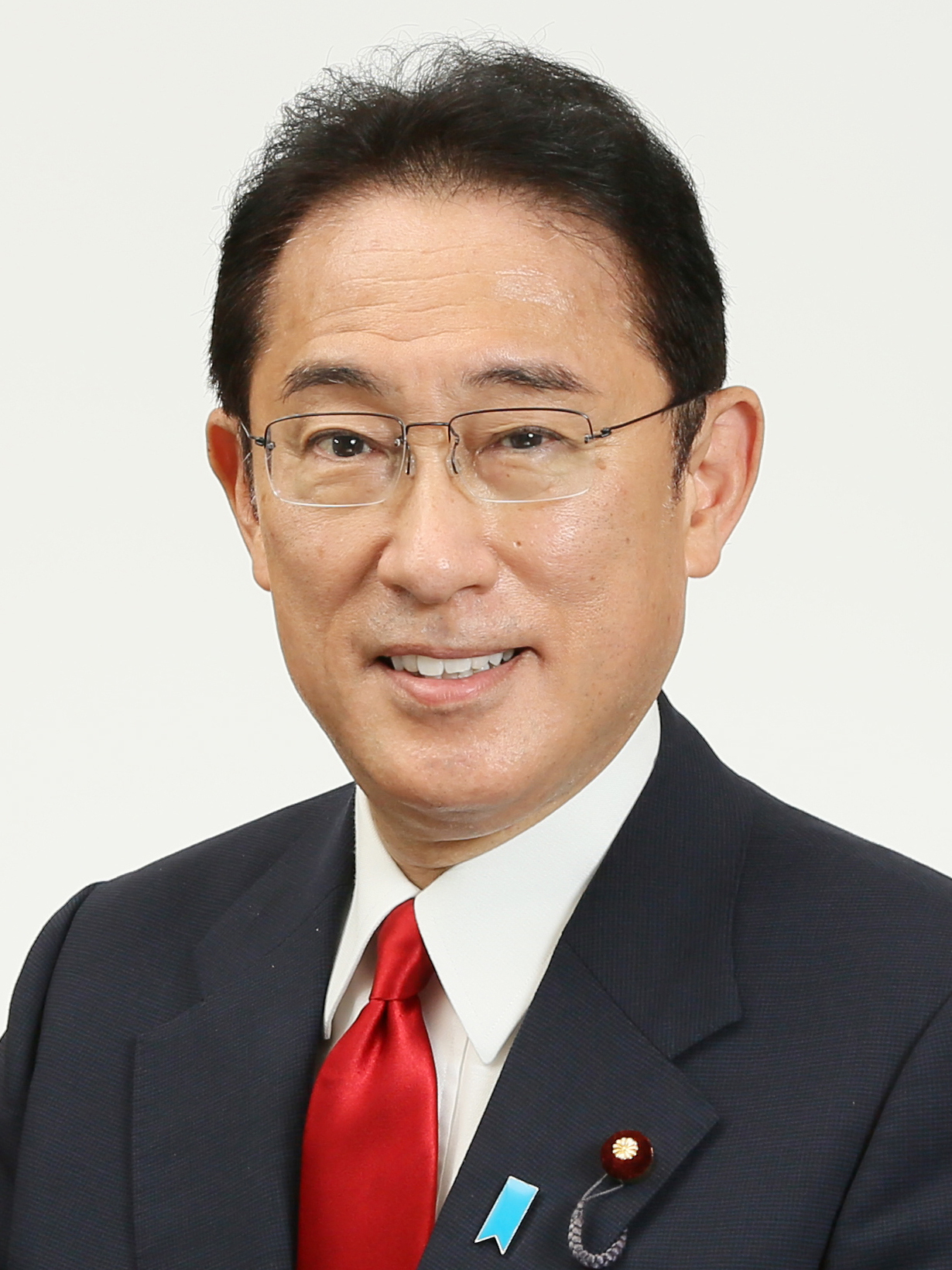

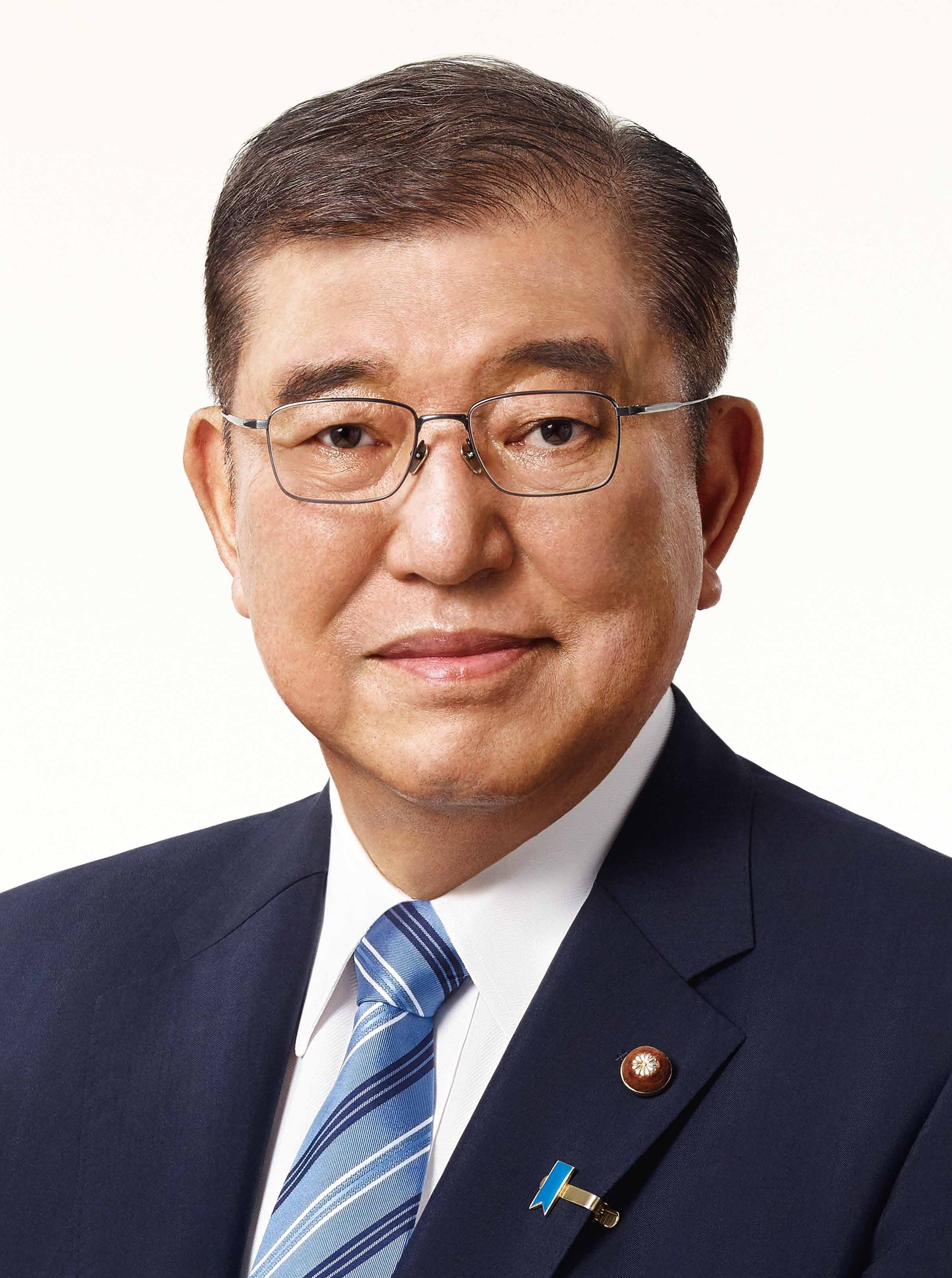
Candidate	Yoshihide Suga	Fumio Kishida	Shigeru Ishiba
Leader's seat	Kanagawa 2nd	Hiroshima 1st	Tottori 1st
LDP MPs	288 (73.28%)	79 (20.10%)	26 (6.62%)
Party members	89 (63.12%)	10 (7.09%)	42 (29.79%)
Total	377 (70.60%)	89 (16.67%)	68 (12.73%)
- Election results
President before election
Shinzo Abe
Elected President
Yoshihide Suga

The 2020 Liberal Democratic Party of Japan presidential election was triggered by Shinzo Abe's announcement on 28 August 2020 that he would resign as President of the Liberal Democratic Party and Prime Minister of Japan, citing a relapse of his colitis. Voting took place on 14 September 2020 to elect the next president of the Liberal Democratic Party of Japan, three days before the National Diet was scheduled to hold a session to elect the new prime minister. Initially scheduled to be held in September 2021, incumbent LDP president and the longest-serving Prime Minister of Japan, Shinzo Abe, suddenly resigned on 28 August 2020, citing recent health concerns, prompting an election to select the president to serve the rest of Abe's term.

Chief Cabinet Secretary Yoshihide Suga easily won the election, securing endorsements from a majority of voting members of the party in the days preceding the vote. As the Liberal Democratic Party controlled a majority in the National Diet as a member of the governing coalition, Suga successfully succeeded Abe as Prime Minister of Japan on 16 September 2020. His principal rival, Fumio Kishida, later succeeded him as prime minister after Suga's resignation in October 2021. The third-placed candidate, Shigeru Ishiba, would eventually succeed Kishida in 2024 after the latter also resigned the party leadership and the premiership.

== Background ==
Following several hospital visits which launched speculation into his health, incumbent prime minister Shinzo Abe announced during a press conference on 28 August 2020 that he would resign before the end of his final term in office due to a resurgence of his chronic ulcerative colitis. During the press conference, Abe announced that as a result the LDP is preparing for a leadership election to choose his successor, and that he would not endorse any specific candidate.

== Procedure ==
There are two ways by which the president could be elected in the presidential election: the first would be an open election in which voting power is given to both party members and members of the National Diet. Each would receive half of the voting power to elect the new president. The other method would allow the vote to be restricted to the Diet members (394) and representatives from each of Japan's 47 prefectures (141), which would add up to 535 electors. According to an LDP lawmaker, Toshihiro Nikai, the party's secretary-general, decided on the second option. To appear on the ballot, candidates must receive at least 20 nominations from the 394 Diet members in the LDP caucus.

== Timeline ==
=== 2020 ===
- 28 August – Shinzo Abe announces his resignation as prime minister and LDP president. He will remain on until a successor is chosen.
- 29 August – Party officials announce the election will take place someday before, on, or after 15 September 2020.
- 31 August – Party officials announce the election will be held on 14 September 2020.
- 1 September – Former Foreign Affairs Minister Fumio Kishida and former Defense Minister Shigeru Ishiba officially announce their candidacies.
- 2 September – Chief Cabinet Secretary Yoshihide Suga officially announces his candidacy.
- 8 September – Campaign officially began. The candidates held a joint press conference.
- 9 September – The first of two public debate between the leadership candidates was held.
- 12 September – The second public debate between the leadership candidates was held.
- 14 September – The election was held; Yoshihide Suga wins on the first ballot with 377 votes.

== Candidates ==
=== Declared ===
Candidate(s)	Date of birth	Notable positions	Party faction(s)	District(s)	Announced	Reference(s)
Yoshihide Suga	6 December 1948 (age 71)	Member of the House of Representatives (since 1996); Minister for Internal Affairs and Communications (2006–2007); Chief Cabinet Secretary (since 2012)	Ganesha no Kai (Suga)	Kanagawa 2nd	2 September 2020	
Fumio Kishida	29 July 1957 (age 63)	Member of the House of Representatives (since 1993); Minister of Foreign Affairs (2012–2017); Acting Defense Minister (2017)	Kōchikai (Kishida)	Hiroshima 1st	1 September 2020	
Shigeru Ishiba	4 February 1957 (age 63)	Member of the House of Representatives (since 1986); Defense Minister (2007–2008); 2008, 2012 and 2018 LDP leadership candidate	Suigetsukai (Ishiba)	Tottori 1st	1 September 2020	

=== Declined ===
- Tarō Asō, Deputy Prime Minister, Minister of Finance, member of the House of Representatives for Fukuoka 8th district; former prime minister (2008–2009) and former party president (2008–2009). Grandson of former prime minister Shigeru Yoshida and brother of Princess Tomohito of Mikasa.
- Tomomi Inada, member of the House of Representatives for Fukui 1st district; former Minister of Defense (2016-2017), Minister of Administrative Reform (2012-2014), Minister of State for Regulatory Reform (2012-2014).
- Shinjiro Koizumi, Minister of the Environment, member of the House of Representatives for Kanagawa 11th district. Son of former prime minister Junichiro Koizumi.
- Tarō Kōno, runner-up in the 2009 leadership election; Minister of Defense, member of the House of Representatives for Kanagawa 15th district; former Minister of Foreign Affairs (2017–2019) and former Chair of the National Public Safety Commission (2015–2016). Son of Yōhei Kōno, a former Speaker of the House of Representatives.
- Toshimitsu Motegi, Minister for Foreign Affairs, member of the House of Representatives for Tochigi 5th district; former Minister of Economy, Trade and Industry (2012–2014).
- Yasutoshi Nishimura, third place candidate in the 2009 leadership election; Minister of State for Economic and Fiscal Policy, member of the House of Representatives for Hyogo 9th district.
- Seiko Noda, member of the House of Representatives for Gifu 1st district; former Minister for Internal Affairs and Communications (2017–2018). Wife of Yōsuke Tsuruho, member of the House of Councillors for Wakayama Prefecture.
- Hakubun Shimomura, current party election strategy chief, member of the House of Representatives for Tokyo 11th district; former Minister of Education, Culture, Sports, Science and Technology (2012–2015).
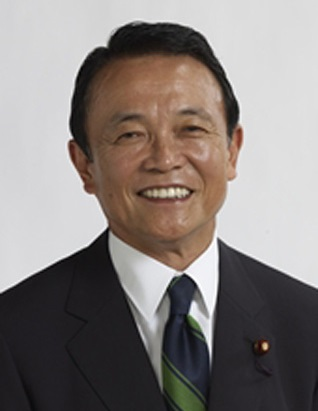
Deputy Prime Minister
(2012–2021)
Tarō Asō

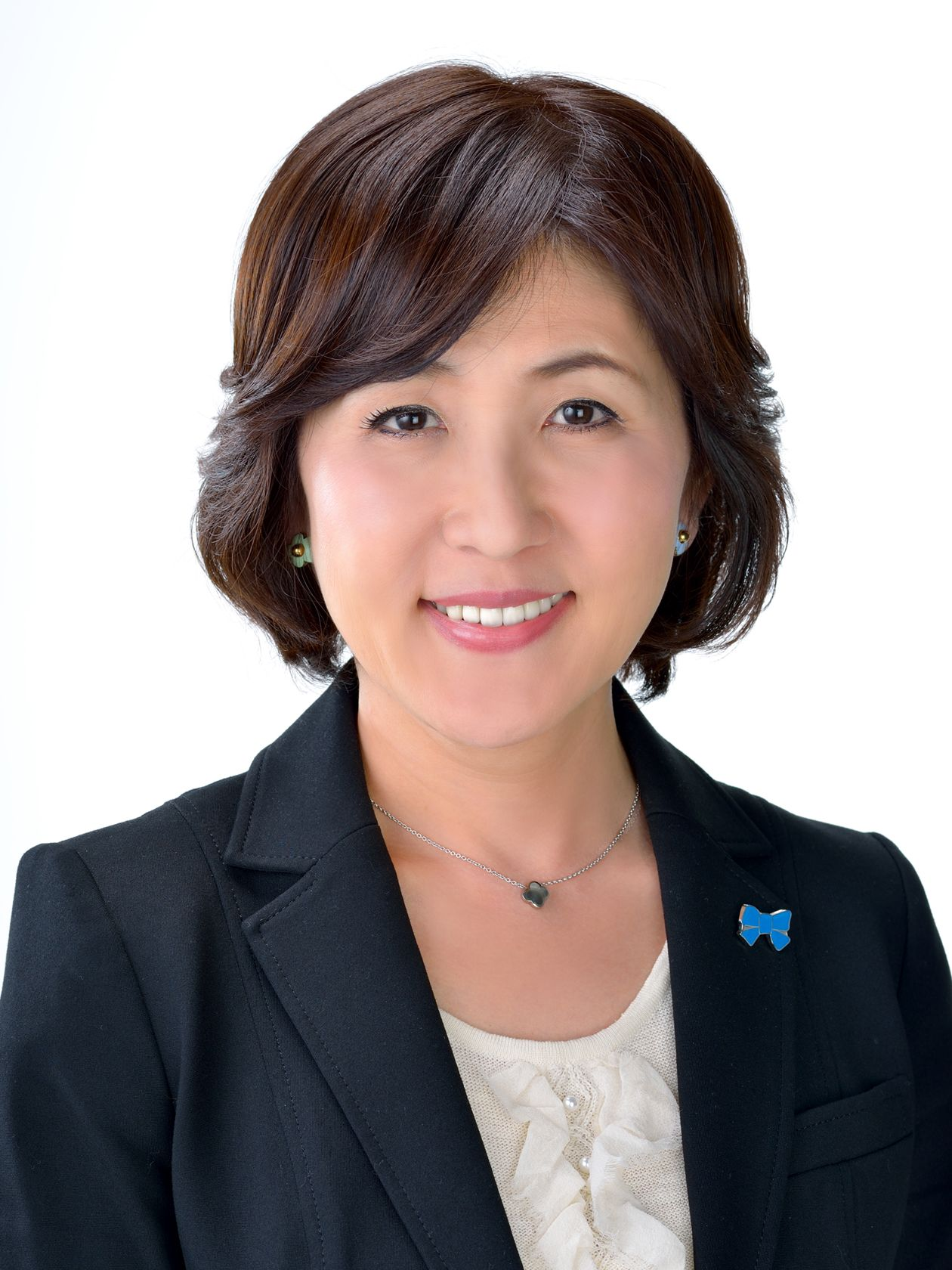
Former Defense Minister
(2016–2017)
Tomomi Inada

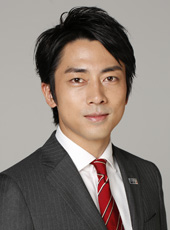
Environment Minister
(2019–2021)
Shinjirō Koizumi

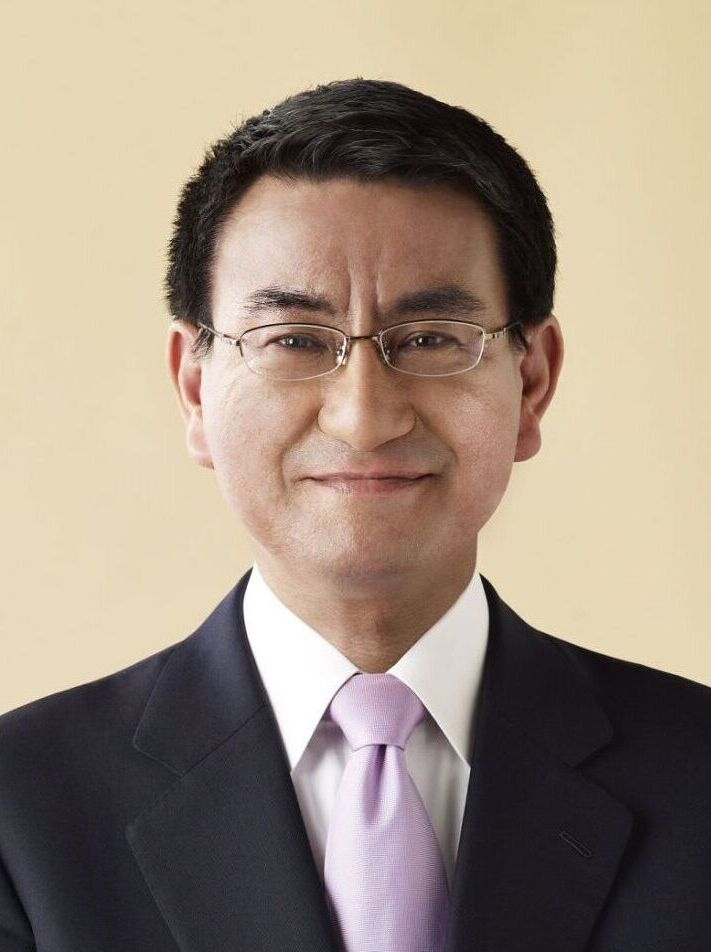
Defense Minister
(2019–2020)
Tarō Kōno

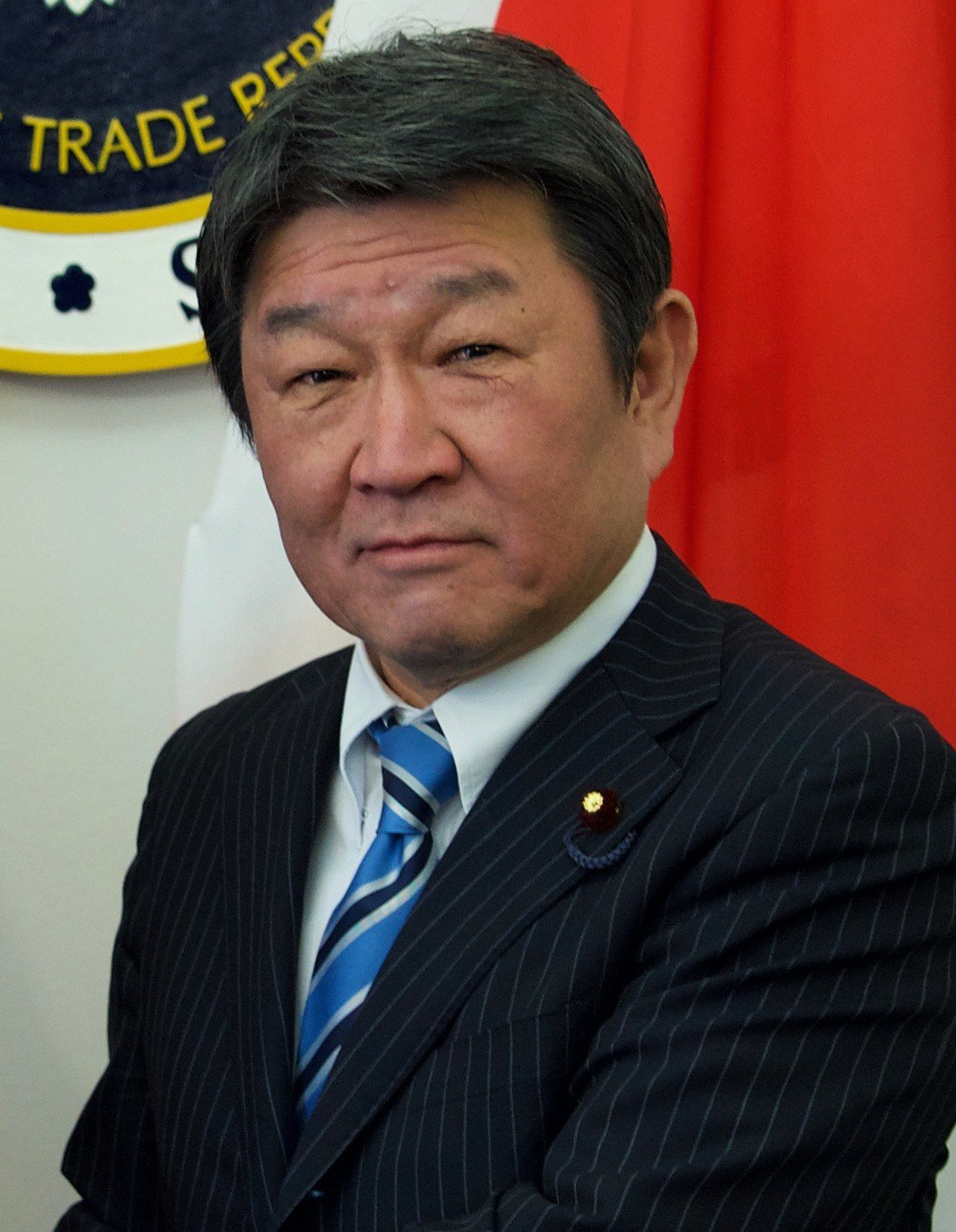
Foreign Affairs Minister
(2019–2021)
Toshimitsu Motegi

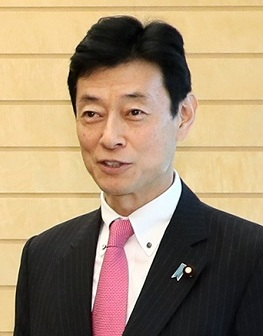
Minister of State for Economic and Fiscal Policy
(2019–2021)
Yasutoshi Nishimura

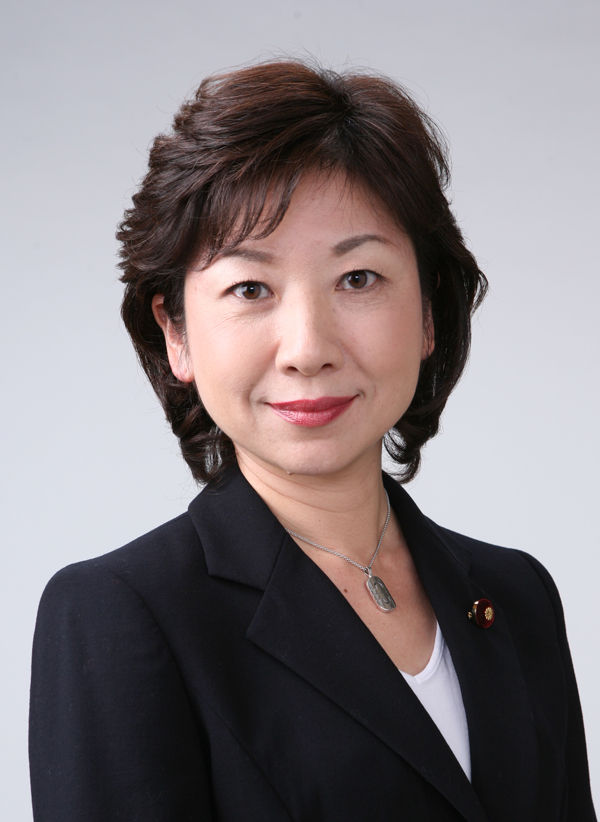
Former Interior Minister
(2017–2018)
Seiko Noda

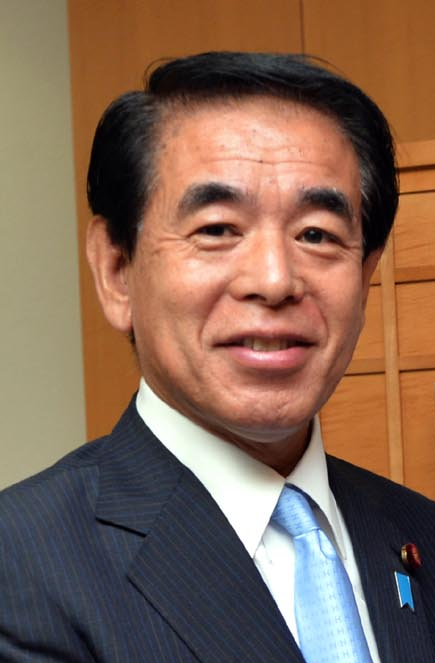
Former Education Minister
(2012–2015)
Hakubun Shimomura

== Supporters ==
=== Recommenders ===
Party regulations require candidates to have the written support at least 20 Diet members, known as recommenders, to run.

Yoshihide Suga

Leader of recommenders

- Hachiro Okonogi (Member of the House of Representatives for Kanagawa 3rd district) (no faction)

Campaign Manager

- Yasukazu Hamada (Member of the House of Representatives for Chiba 12th district) (no faction)

Recommenders

- Ryū Shionoya (Member of the House of Representatives for Shizuoka 8th district) (Seiwakai)
- Takashi Fujiwara (Member of the House of Representatives for Tohoku PR block) (Seiwakai)
- Miki Yamada (Member of the House of Representatives for Tokyo PR block) (Seiwakai)
- Junzo Yamamoto (Member of the House of Councillors from Ehime) (Seiwakai)
- Tetsushi Sakamoto (Member of the House of Representatives for Kumamoto 3rd district) (Kinmirai Seiji Kenkyūkai)
- Hideki Makihara (Member of the House of Representatives for Northern Kanto PR block) (Yūrinkai/Ganesha no Kai)
- Yūmi Yoshikawa (Member of the House of Councillors from Mie) (Seiwakai/Yūrinkai)
- Taro Kono (Member of the House of Representatives for Kanagawa 15th district) (Shikōkai)
- Karen Makishima (Member of the House of Representatives for Kanagawa 17th district) (Shikōkai)
- Haruko Arimura (Member of the House of Councillors from National PR block) (Shikōkai)
- Taimei Yamaguchi (Member of the House of Representatives for Saitama 10th district) (Heiseiken)
- Kozaburo Nishime (Member of the House of Representatives for Okinawa 4th district) (Heiseiken)
- Takako Suzuki (Member of the House of Representatives for Hokkaido PR block) (Heiseiken)
- Yoshifumi Tsuge (Member of the House of Councillors from National PR block) (no faction)
- Hiroo Ishii (Member of the House of Councillors from Akita) (Heiseiken)
- Katsuei Hirasawa (Member of the House of Representatives for Tokyo 17th district) (Shisuikai)
- Takamori Yoshikawa (Member of the House of Representatives for Hokkaido 2nd district) (Shisuikai)
- Yosuke Tsuruho (Member of the House of Councillors from Wakayama) (Shisuikai)
- Yayoi Kimura (Member of the House of Representatives for Kinki PR block) (no faction)
Fumio Kishida

Leader of recommenders and Campaign Manager

- Toshiaki Endo (Member of the House of Representatives for Yamagata 1st district) (Yūrinkai)

Recommenders

- Takumi Nemoto (Member of the House of Representatives for Fukushima 2nd district) (Kōchikai)
- Shōgo Azemoto (Member of the House of Representatives for Chūgoku PR block) (Kōchikai)
- Hiroyuki Ōnishi (Member of the House of Representatives for Osaka 1st district) (Kōchikai)
- Shunpei Kaneko (Member of the House of Representatives for Gifu 4th district) (Kōchikai)
- Yōko Kamikawa (Member of the House of Representatives for Shizuoka 1st district) (Kōchikai)
- Ayano Kunimitsu (Member of the House of Representatives for Ibaraki 6th district) (Kōchikai)
- Kiyoto Tsuji (Member of the House of Representatives for Tokyo 2nd district) (Kōchikai)
- Shoji Nishida (Member of the House of Representatives for Ishikawa 3rd district) (Kōchikai)
- Yoichi Fukazawa (Member of the House of Representatives for Shizuoka 4th district) (Kōchikai)
- Noriko Horiuchi (Member of the House of Representatives for Yamanashi 2nd district) (Kōchikai)
- Hideki Murai (Member of the House of Representatives for Saitama 1st district) (Kōchikai)
- Takeru Yoshikawa (Member of the House of Representatives for Tōkai PR block) (Kōchikai)
- Toshiyuki Adachi (Member of the House of Councillors from National PR block) (Kōchikai)
- Takashi Koyari (Member of the House of Councillors from Shiga) (Kōchikai)
- Yoshimasa Hayashi (Member of the House of Councillors from Yamaguchi) (Kōchikai)
- Shinya Fujiki (Member of the House of Councillors from National PR block) (Kōchikai)
- Yasuhiro Ozato (Member of the House of Representatives for Kagoshima 3rd district) (Yūrinkai)
- Ayuko Kato (Member of the House of Representatives for Yamagata 3rd district) (Yūrinkai)
- Taro Honda (Member of the House of Representatives for Kyoto 5th district) (Yūrinkai)
Shigeru Ishiba

Leader of recommenders

- Ichirō Kamoshita (Member of the House of Representatives for Tokyo 13th district) (Suigetsukai)

Campaign Manager

- Yūji Yamamoto (Member of the House of Representatives for Shikoku PR block) (Suigetsukai)

Recommenders

- Hiroaki Kadoyama (Member of the House of Representatives for Chiba 1st district) (Suigetsukai)
- Tetsuya Yagi (Member of the House of Representatives for Tōkai PR block) (Suigetsukai)
- Takashi Yamashita (Member of the House of Representatives for Okayama 2nd district) (Suigetsukai)
- Masazumi Gotoda (Member of the House of Representatives for Tokushima 1st district) (Suigetsukai)
- Shōji Maitachi (Member of the House of Councillors from Tottori-Shimane) (Suigetsukai)
- Satoshi Nakanishi (Member of the House of Councillors from National PR block) (Suigetsukai)
- Seiichiro Murakami (Member of the House of Representatives for Ehime 2nd district) (no faction)
- Gen Nakatani (Member of the House of Representatives for Kōchi 1st district) (Yūrinkai)
- Kisaburo Tokai (Member of the House of Representatives for Hyōgo 10th district) (no faction)
- Keiichiro Tachibana (Member of the House of Representatives for Toyama 3rd district) (no faction)
- Tatsuya Ito (Member of the House of Representatives for Tokyo 22nd district) (Suigetsukai)
- Ken Saitō (Member of the House of Representatives for Chiba 7th district) (Suigetsukai)
- Ryosei Akazawa (Member of the House of Representatives for Tottori 2nd district) (Suigetsukai)
- Masaaki Taira (Member of the House of Representatives for Tokyo 4th district) (Suigetsukai)
- Mamoru Fukuyama (Member of the House of Representatives for Shikoku PR block) (Suigetsukai)
- Asahiko Mihara (Member of the House of Representatives for Fukuoka 9th district) (Heiseiken)
- Saichi Kamiyama (Member of the House of Representatives for Saitama 7th district) (Suigetsukai)
- Hiroyuki Togashi (Member of the House of Representatives for Akita 1st district) (Suigetsukai)

Number of recommenders by factions

Candidates	Yoshihide Suga	Fumio Kishida	Shigeru Ishiba
Heisei Kenkyūkai	4	0	1
Kinmirai Seiji Kenkyūkai	1	0	0
Kōchikai	0	16	0
Seiwa Seisaku Kenkyūkai	5	0	0
Shikōkai	3	0	0
Shisuikai	3	0	0
Suigetsukai	0	0	15
Yūrinkai	1	4	1
No faction	4	0	3

=== Endorsements ===
Endorsements of Shigeru Ishiba

Members of the National Diet
Prefectural politicians
Municipal politicians
Party factions

- Suigetsukai (Ishiba's faction; 20 members)

Other prominent individuals
Organizations
Media
Total endorsements: 1

Endorsements of Fumio Kishida

Members of the National Diet
Prefectural politicians
Municipal politicians
Party factions

- Kōchikai (Kishida's faction; 47 members)

Other prominent individuals
Organizations
Media
Total endorsements: 1

Endorsements of Yoshihide Suga

Members of the National Diet

- Tarō Asō (R)
  - Deputy Prime Minister; Minister of Finance; leader of the Shikōkai faction; Member of the House of Representatives for Fukuoka 8th district; former prime minister, 2008-2009; former party president, 2008-2009)
- Hiroyuki Hosoda (R)
  - Leader of the Seiwa Seisaku Kenkyūkai faction; Member of the House of Representatives for Shimane 1st district); former Chief Cabinet Secretary, 2004-2005)
- Nobuteru Ishihara (R)
  - Leader of the Kinmirai Seiji Kenkyūkai faction; Member of the House of Representatives for Tokyo 8th district; former Minister of the Environment, 2012-2014)
- Toshihiro Nikai (R)
  - Secretary-General of the Liberal Democratic Party; leader of the Shisuikai faction; Member of the House of Representatives for Wakayama 3rd district; former Minister of Economy, Trade and Industry, 2005-2006, 2008-2009; Minister of Transport, 1999-2000)
- Wataru Takeshita (R)
  - Leader of the Heisei Kenkyūkai faction; Member of the House of Representatives for Shimane 2nd district; former Minister for Reconstruction, 2014-2015)

Prefectural politicians
Municipal politicians
Party factions

- Seiwa Seisaku Kenkyūkai (Largest faction in the LDP; 98 members)
- Shikōkai (Second-largest faction in the LDP; 54 members)
- Heisei Kenkyūkai (Third-largest faction in the LDP; 54 members)
- Shisuikai (Fourth-largest faction in the LDP; 47 members)
- Kinmirai Seiji Kenkyūkai (Small faction in the LDP; 11 members)

Other prominent individuals
Organizations
Media
Total endorsements: 10

== Opinion polling ==
=== Nationwide ===
View source data.

Polling firm/link	Date of polling	Sample size	Fumio Kishida	Shinjiro Koizumi	Tarō Kōno	Shigeru Ishiba	Hakubun Shimomura	Yoshihide Suga	Undecided/NOTA	Notes
Mainichi Shimbun/SSRC	9 September 2020	Unknown	–	–	–	36%	–	44%	20%	
Asahi Shimbun	2–3 September 2020	1,130	5%	–	–	25%	–	38%	32%	
Nikkei/TV Tokyo	29–30 August 2020	Unknown	6%	14%	15%	28%	–	11%	26%	
Kyodo News	28–30 August 2020	1,050	7.5%	10.1%	13.6%	34.3%	–	14.3%	20.2%	

== Results ==
Full result
Candidate	Diet members		Party members				Total points	
Candidate	Votes	%	Popular votes	%	Allocated votes	%	Votes	%
Yoshihide Suga 当	288	73.28%	367,164	54.34%	89	63.12%	377	70.60%
Fumio Kishida	79	20.10%	91,858	13.60%	10	7.09%	89	16.67%
Shigeru Ishiba	26	6.62%	216,597	32.06%	42	29.79%	68	12.73%
Total	393	100.00%	675,619	100.00%	141	100.00%	534	100.00%
Valid votes	393	100.00%	675,619		141	100.00%	534	100.00%
Invalid and blank votes	0	0.00%			0	0.00%	0	0.00%
Turnout	393 (Note: Koichi Yamamoto withdrew from competition, taking into consideration the impact of COVID-19.)	99.75%			141	100.00%	534	99.81%
Registered voters	394	100.00%			141	100.00%	535	100.00%

44 prefectural LDP branches held primaries, while the prefectural federations in Hokkaido and Niigata conducted questionnaire-style surveys among their members and the LDP Akita didn't hold any form of membership vote.

Of the 46 primaries or surveys, Kishida only carried his home prefecture of Hiroshima, winning all three delegates, and Yamanashi where he won two delegates over one for Suga.

Ishiba won all three delegates in his home prefecture of Tottori, and carried Toyama, Mie, Shimane, Kōchi and Miyazaki by two delegates to one over Suga. Yamagata, Fukushima, Kagawa, Nagasaki and Kumamoto split their delegates evenly between the three candidates.

In all other prefectures, Suga prevailed, winning either all three prefectural delegates, or two with the third going to Ishiba, depending on the vote margin of his victory and on whether the primary voting system was d'Hondt proportional, as it was in the majority of prefectures, or FPTP.

=== Results of Party Members' Votes by Prefectures ===
Results of Party Members' Votes by Prefectures
Prefectures	Yoshihide Suga			Shigeru Ishiba			Fumio Kishida		
Prefectures	Votes	%		Votes	%		Votes	%	
Aichi	20,698	59.8%	2	12,137	35.1%	1	1,751	5.1%	0
Akita (Note: Akita didn't hold a primary election and voted for Suga, who was born in the prefecture.)	No votes		3	No votes		0	No votes		0
Aomori	4,207	61.1%	2	2,255	32.7%	1	430	6.2%	0
Chiba (Note: Winner take all delegates.)	10,998	58.2%	3	7,059	37.4%	0	834	4.4%	0
Ehime	6,522	53.1%	2	4,883	39.8%	1	870	7.1%	0
Fukui	4,051	57.3%	2	2,407	34.1%	1	610	8.6%	0
Fukuoka	8,038	50.0%	2	4,408	27.4%	1	3,623	22.6%	0
Fukushima	4,130	43.0%	1	3,250	33.8%	1	2,233	23.2%	1
Gifu	12,859	53.5%	2	7,819	32.6%	1	3,342	13.9%	0
Gunma	9,918	58.1%	2	6,361	37.2%	1	808	4.7%	0
Hiroshima	1,655	8.6%	0	2,137	11.1%	0	15,507	80.3%	3
Hokkaido	11,678	56.1%	3	7,634	36.6%	0	1,517	7.3%	0
Hyōgo	7,847	54.6%	2	5,406	37.6%	1	1,121	7.8%	0
Ibaraki	18,790	59.3%	2	9,842	31.0%	1	3,070	9.7%	0
Ishikawa	7,737	50.1%	2	4,266	27.7%	1	3,429	22.2%	0
Iwate	3,039	62.6%	2	1,594	32.8%	1	222	4.6%	0
Kagawa	5,063	42.4%	1	3,418	28.6%	1	3,460	29.0%	1
Kagoshima	6,292	58.3%	2	3,811	35.3%	1	691	6.4%	0
Kanagawa	30,447	78.6%	3	6,996	18.1%	0	1,272	3.3%	0
Kōchi	2,132	39.5%	1	3,092	57.4%	2	167	3.1%	0
Kumamoto	5,881	44.1%	1	3,203	24.0%	1	4,259	31.9%	1
Kyoto	4,922	51.3%	2	3,724	38.8%	1	948	9.9%	0
Mie	2,630	30.9%	1	4,239	49.9%	2	1,630	19.2%	0
Miyagi	6,255	65.7%	2	2,104	22.1%	1	1,162	12.2%	0
Miyazaki	3,040	41.0%	1	3,461	46.7%	2	915	12.3%	0
Nagano	5,508	54.3%	2	3,978	39.2%	1	655	6.5%	0
Nagasaki	4,986	43.9%	1	3,516	30.9%	1	2,866	25.2%	1
Nara (Note: 1st place: 2 delegates, 2nd place: 1 delegate.)	3,145	62.6%	2	1,544	30.7%	1	335	6.7%	0
Niigata	8,990	69.6%	3	3,449	26.7%	0	482	3.7%	0
Ōita	4,709	55.8%	2	3,187	37.8%	1	544	6.4%	0
Okayama	6,270	53.9%	2	4,233	36.4%	1	1,132	9.7%	0
Okinawa	2,298	63.2%	3	575	15.8%	0	764	21.0%	0
Osaka	13,410	54.8%	2	8,062	33.0%	1	2,992	12.2%	0
Saga	2,442	43.1%	2	2,312	40.8%	1	909	16.1%	0
Saitama	12,508	61.2%	3	6,412	31.4%	0	1,510	7.4%	0
Shiga	3,421	50.2%	2	2,464	36.1%	1	935	13.7%	0
Shimane	3,391	38,9%	1	4,906	56.3%	2	422	4.8%	0
Shizuoka	8,772	46.6%	2	5,750	30.5%	1	4,308	22.9%	0
Tochigi	7,359	59.3%	2	4,363	35.2%	1	685	5.5%	0
Tokushima	3,506	50.7%	2	3,226	46.7%	1	177	2.6%	0
Tokyo	44,579	64.1%	3	18,808	27.0%	0	6,161	8.9%	0
Tottori	371	4.6%	0	7,683	94.7%	3	54	0.7%	0
Toyama	7,468	38.3%	1	8,711	44.7%	2	3,307	17.0%	0
Wakayama	9,863	82.6%	3	1,836	15.4%	0	235	2.0%	0
Yamagata	2,619	36.7%	1	2,188	30.7%	1	2,326	32.6%	1
Yamaguchi	9,505	69.5%	3	2,006	14.7%	0	2,157	15.8%	0
Yamanashi	3,215	31,7%	1	1,882	18.6%	0	5,031	49.7%	2
Total	367,164	54.3%	89	216,597	32.1%	42	91,858	13.6%	10
