= 2007 Liberal Democratic Party presidential election =

Political leadership election in Japan

- 23 September 2007
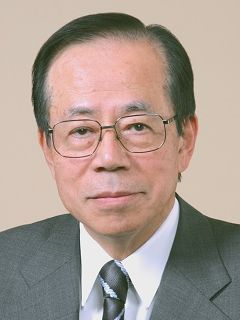

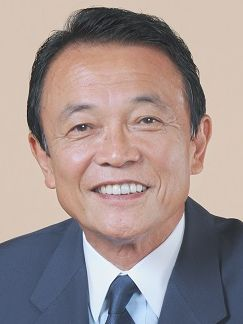
Candidate	Yasuo Fukuda	Tarō Asō
Leader's seat	Gunma 4th	Fukuoka 8th
LDP MPs	254 (65.80%)	132 (34.20%)
Party members	76 (53.90%)	65 (46.10%)
Total	330 (62.62%)	197 (37.38%)
President before election
Shinzō Abe
Elected President
Yasuo Fukuda

The 2007 Liberal Democratic Party presidential election was held on 23 September 2007 after the incumbent party leader and Prime Minister of Japan Shinzo Abe announced that he would resign on 12 September 2007. Abe had only been elected to the post slightly less than a year earlier; his resignation came only three days after a new parliamentary session had begun. Abe said his unpopularity was hindering the passage of an anti-terrorism law, involving among other things Japan's continued military presence in Afghanistan. Party officials also said the embattled Prime Minister was suffering from poor health.

Fukuda defeated Asō in the election, receiving 330 votes against 197 votes for Asō.

Since the LDP had an absolute majority in the lower house, Fukuda became Prime Minister on 25 September 2007. His principal rival, Tarō Asō, later succeeded him as prime minister after Fukuda's resignation in September 2008.

== Campaign ==
Aso conceded on 16 September 2007 that he was unlikely to win the race and stated he was primarily continuing as a candidate to give party members a choice. Fukuda had by that date gathered the official support of eight factions of the LDP, all except Aso's own faction; he furthermore stated he would not visit the controversial Yasukuni Shrine, and proposed the construction of a secular national memorial facility instead. Aso stated that there could be no replacement for the shrine, but did not state whether he would visit the shrine if elected. Fukuda struck a more conciliatory tone in relation to the North Korean abduction issue, while Aso positioned himself as a hardliner.

According to media surveys, Fukuda had 213 of the lawmakers on his side, while Aso had the assured support of 45 Diet members. Observers agreed that Fukuda was almost certain to win due to the widespread support across faction borders he had obtained.

Fukuda received 330 votes in the election, held on 23 September, defeating Asō, who received 197 votes. The support from Diet members alone was enough for Fukuda to win the leadership in the first round.

== Candidates ==
Endorsement by at least twenty LDP lawmakers is necessary to become a candidate in the election. Since there are 387 LDP Diet members and 141 prefectural LDP representatives (three for each of the 47 prefectural chapters), there is a total of 528 votes. The following people were candidates in the election:

=== Declared ===
Candidate(s)	Date of birth	Current position	Party faction	Electoral district
Yasuo Fukuda	16 July 1936 (age 71)	Member of the House of Representatives (since 1990) Previous offices held: Chief Cabinet Secretary (2000-2004); Minister of State for Gender Equality (2001–2004); Director-General of the Okinawa Development Agency (2000)	Seiwa Seisaku Kenkyūkai (Machimura)	Gunma 4th
Tarō Asō	20 September 1940 (age 67)	Secretary-General of the Liberal Democratic Party (since 2007); Member of the House of Representatives (1979–1983, since 1986) Previous offices held: Minister for Foreign Affairs (2005–2007); Minister of Internal Affairs and Communications (2003–2005)	Ikōkai (Asō)	Fukuoka 8th

=== Declined ===
People who were considered likely candidates, but refused to seek the nomination, were:

- Former Prime Minister Junichiro Koizumi, Abe's immediate predecessor, was also considered a possible candidate, but declined to seek the nomination. He expressed his support for Fukuda on 14 September 2007.
- The incumbent Minister of Finance Fukushiro Nukaga initially stated on 13 September 2007 he would run, but decided to support Fukuda on 14 September 2007 after he had a 40-minute meeting with him.
- Sadakazu Tanigaki, a former Minister of Finance under Junichiro Koizumi, and Taku Yamasaki, a former LDP Secretary General and the third candidate in the 2006 leadership election, both announced their support for Fukuda on 14 September 2007, as did former LDP Secretary General Makoto Koga.
- Kaoru Yosano, the incumbent Chief Cabinet Secretary, was also considered a likely candidate, but did not stand.

== Supporters ==
=== Recommenders ===
Party regulations require candidates to have the written support at least 20 Diet members, known as recommenders, to run.

Yasuo Fukuda

Leader of recommenders

- Seiko Hashimoto (Member of the House of Councillors from National PR block) (Seiwakai)

Campaign Manager

- Yūji Tsushima (Member of the House of Representatives for Aomori 1st district) (Heiseiken)

Recommenders

- Ichiro Aisawa (Member of the House of Representatives for Okayama 1st district) (Yūrinkai)
- Ichiro Ichikawa (Member of the House of Councillors from Miyagi) (Shin Zaisei Kenkyūkai)
- Hiromi Iwanaga (Member of the House of Councillors from Saga) (Heiseiken)
- Kazuyoshi Kaneko (Member of the House of Representatives for Gifu 4th district) (Shin Zaisei Kenkyūkai)
- Yoriko Kawaguchi (Member of the House of Councillors from National PR block) (no faction)
- Shigeo Kitamura (Member of the House of Representatives for Ishikawa 3rd district) (Seiwakai)
- Takashi Sasagawa (Member of the House of Representatives for Gunma 2nd district) (Heiseiken)
- Hirofumi Nakasone (Member of the House of Councillors from Gunma) (Shisuikai)
- Taro Nakayama (Member of the House of Representatives for Osaka 18th district) (no faction)
- Takeshi Noda (Member of the House of Representatives for Kumamoto 2nd district) (Kinmirai Seiji Kenkyūkai)
- Kyogon Hagiyama (Member of the House of Representatives for Hokuriku-Shin'etsu PR block) (Shisuikai)
- Takashi Fukaya (Member of the House of Representatives for Tokyo 2nd district) (Kinmirai Seiji Kenkyūkai)
- Kenshiro Matsunami (Member of the House of Representatives for Kinki PR block) (Atarashii Nami)
- Yoichi Miyazawa (Member of the House of Representatives for Hiroshima 7th district) (Shin Zaisei Kenkyūkai)
- Seiichiro Murakami (Member of the House of Representatives for Ehime 2nd district) (Banchōken)
- Yoshirō Mori (Member of the House of Representatives for Ishikawa 2nd district) (Seiwakai)
- Yoshio Yatsu (Member of the House of Representatives for Gunma 3rd district) (Shisuikai)
- Toshio Yamauchi (Member of the House of Councillors from Kagawa) (Kinmirai Seiji Kenkyūkai)
Tarō Asō

Leader of recommenders

- Kunio Hatoyama (Member of the House of Representatives for Fukuoka 6th district) (Heiseiken)

Campaign Manager

- Yoshinobu Shimamura (Member of the House of Representatives for Tokyo 16th district) (no faction)

Recommenders

- Akira Amari (Member of the House of Representatives for Kanagawa 13th district) (Kinmirai Seiji Kenkyūkai)
- Hiroshi Imai (Member of the House of Representatives for Saitama 3rd district) (Shin Zaisei Kenkyūkai)
- Nobuhiko Endō (Member of the House of Representatives for Kyushu PR block) (no faction)
- Chubee Kagita (Member of the House of Representatives for Kinki PR block) (Shisuikai)
- Yoshitada Konoike (Member of the House of Councillors from Hyōgo) (Ikōkai)
- Manabu Sakai (Member of the House of Representatives for Kanagawa 5th district) (no faction)
- Kazuyasu Shiina (Member of the House of Councillors from Chiba) (Shisuikai)
- Yoshihide Suga (Member of the House of Representatives for Kanagawa 2nd district) (Shin Zaisei Kenkyūkai)
- Ryota Takeda (Member of the House of Representatives for Fukuoka 11th district) (Kinmirai Seiji Kenkyūkai)
- Tōru Toida (Member of the House of Representatives for Hyōgo 11th district) (Heiseiken)
- Shōichi Nakagawa (Member of the House of Representatives for Hokkaido 11th district) (Shisuikai)
- Keiko Nagaoka (Member of the House of Representatives for Northern Kanto PR block) (Ikōkai)
- Kyoko Nishikawa (Member of the House of Representatives for Fukuoka 10th district) (Shisuikai)
- Yasukazu Hamada (Member of the House of Representatives for Chiba 12th district) (no faction)
- Tatsuharu Mawatari (Member of the House of Representatives for Tōkai PR block) (Heiseiken)
- Yoji Muto (Member of the House of Representatives for Gifu 3rd district) (Ikōkai)
- Taimei Yamaguchi (Member of the House of Representatives for Saitama 10th district) (Heiseiken)
- Rokuzaemon Yoshida (Member of the House of Representatives for Hokuriku-Shin'etsu PR block) (Shisuikai)

Number of recommenders by factions

Candidates	Yasuo Fukuda	Tarō Asō
Atarashii Nami	1	0
Banchō Seisaku Kenkyūjo	1	0
Heisei Kenkyūkai	3	4
Ikōkai	0	3
Kinmirai Seiji Kenkyūkai	3	2
Seiwa Seisaku Kenkyūkai	3	0
Shin Zaisei Kenkyūkai	3	2
Shisuikai	3	5
Yūrinkai	1	0
No faction	2	4

== Results ==
Full result
Candidate	Diet members		Party members				Total points	
Candidate	Votes	%	Popular votes	%	Allocated votes	%	Votes	%
Yasuo Fukuda 当	254	65.80%			76	53.90%	330	62.62%
Tarō Asō	132	34.20%			65	46.10%	197	37.38%
Total	386	100.00%			141	100.00%	527	100.00%
Valid votes	386	99.74%			141	100.00%	527	99.81%
Invalid and blank votes	1	0.26%			0	0.00%	1	0.19%
Turnout	387	100.00%			141	100.00%	528	100.00%
Registered voters	387	100.00%			141	100.00%	528	100.00%

=== Results of Party Members' Votes by Prefectures ===
Results of Party Members' Votes by Prefectures
Prefectures	Yasuo Fukuda			Tarō Asō		
Prefectures	Votes	%		Votes	%	
Aichi			1			2
Akita			1			2
Aomori			1			2
Chiba (Note: Winner take all delegates.)			0			3
Ehime			0			3
Fukui			2			1
Fukuoka (Note: Executive decision.)	No votes		0	No votes		3
Fukushima	No votes		2	No votes		1
Gifu (Note: Representative vote.)			2			1
Gunma	No votes		3	No votes		0
Hiroshima			3			0
Hokkaido			2			1
Hyōgo			1			2
Ibaraki	No votes		0	No votes		3
Ishikawa			2			1
Iwate			1			2
Kagawa			1			2
Kagoshima			3			0
Kanagawa			0			3
Kōchi			1			2
Kumamoto			2			1
Kyoto			2			1
Mie			2			1
Miyagi			1			2
Miyazaki			1			2
Nagano			3			0
Nagasaki			1			2
Nara			2			1
Niigata			0			3
Ōita			0			3
Okayama			2			1
Okinawa			3			0
Osaka			1			2
Saga			1			2
Saitama			3			0
Shiga			2			1
Shimane			3			0
Shizuoka			1			2
Tochigi			3			0
Tokushima			2			1
Tokyo			0			3
Tottori			2			1
Toyama			3			0
Wakayama			3			0
Yamagata			2			1
Yamaguchi	No votes		3	No votes		0
Yamanashi			2			1
Total			76			65
