= 2006 Liberal Democratic Party presidential election =

Political leadership election in Japan

- 20 September 2006
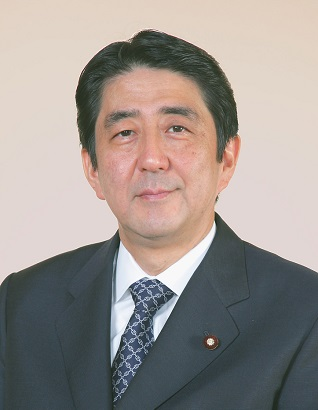

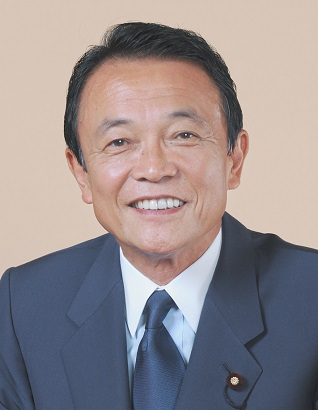

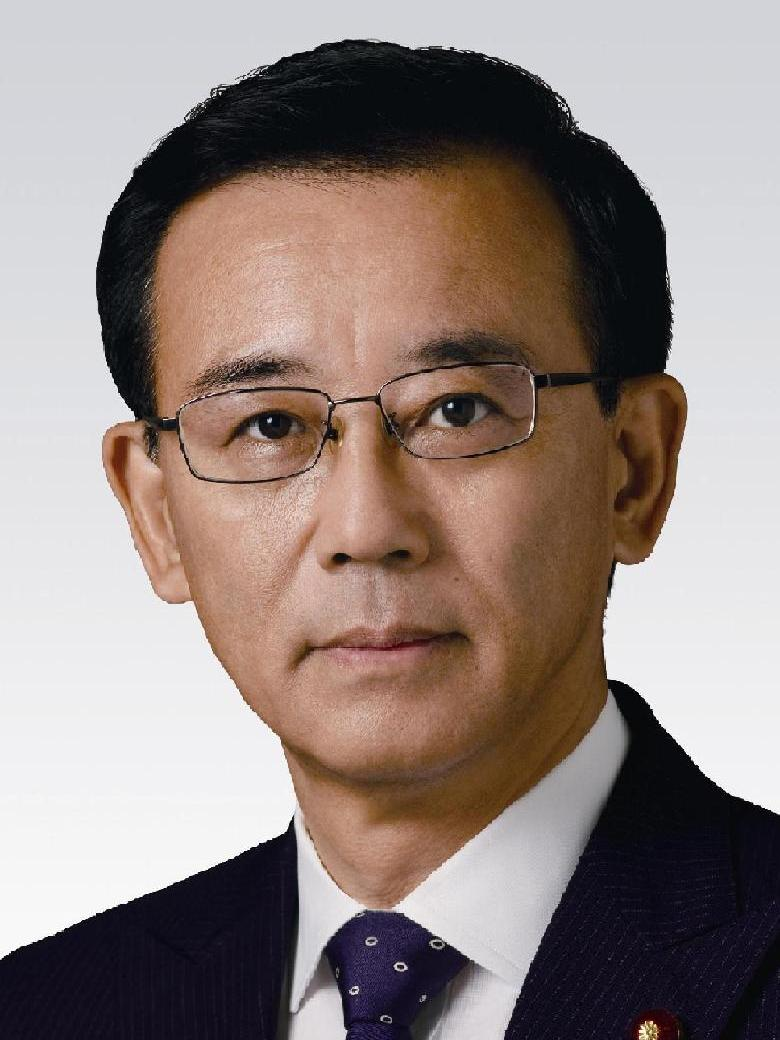
Candidate	Shinzo Abe	Tarō Asō	Sadakazu Tanigaki
Leader's seat	Yamaguchi 4th	Fukuoka 8th	Kyoto 5th
LDP MPs	267 (66.42%)	69 (17.16%)	66 (16.42%)
Party members	197 (65.67%)	67 (22.33%)	36 (12.00%)
Total	464 (66.10%)	136 (19.37%)	102 (14.53%)
President before election
Junichiro Koizumi
Elected President
Shinzo Abe

The 2006 Liberal Democratic Party presidential election was held on 20 September 2006 after the incumbent party leader and Prime Minister of Japan Junichiro Koizumi announced his intention to resign, a year after he led the party to landslide victory in the 2005 snap general election.

Shinzo Abe won the election, (only to resign a year later triggering another leadership election). His chief competitors for the position were Sadakazu Tanigaki and Tarō Asō. Yasuo Fukuda was a leading early contender, but ultimately chose not to run. Former Prime Minister Yoshirō Mori, to whose faction both Abe and Fukuda belonged, stated that the faction strongly leant toward Abe. Abe was subsequently elected Prime Minister with 339 of 475 votes in the National Diet's lower house and a majority in the upper house.

== Candidates ==
=== Declared ===
Candidate(s)	Date of birth	Current position	Party faction	Electoral district
Shinzo Abe	21 September 1954 (age 51)	Chief Cabinet Secretary (since 2005); Member of the House of Representatives (since 1993) Previous offices held: Secretary-General of the Liberal Democratic Party (2003–2004)	Seiwa Seisaku Kenkyūkai (Mori)	Yamaguchi 4th
Tarō Asō	20 September 1940 (age 66)	Minister for Foreign Affairs (since 2005); Member of the House of Representatives (1979–1983, since 1986) Previous offices held: Minister of Internal Affairs and Communications (2003–2005)	Daiyukai (Kōno)	Fukuoka 8th
Sadakazu Tanigaki	7 March 1945 (age 61)	Minister of Finance (since 2003); Member of the House of Representatives (since 1983) Other offices: Chairperson of the National Public Safety Commission (2002–2003)	Yūrinkai (Tanigaki)	Kyoto 5th

== Supporters ==
=== Recommenders ===
Party regulations require candidates to have the written support at least 20 Diet members, known as recommenders, to run.

Shinzo Abe

Leader of recommenders

- Hakuo Yanagisawa (Member of the House of Representatives for Shizuoka 3rd district) (Shin Zaisei Kenkyūkai)

Campaign Manager

- Akira Amari (Member of the House of Representatives for Kanagawa 13th district) (Kinmirai Seiji Kenkyūkai)

Recommenders

- Norihiko Akagi (Member of the House of Representatives for Ibaraki 1st district) (Banchōken)
- Haruko Arimura (Member of the House of Councillors from National PR block) (Banchōken)
- Nobuteru Ishihara (Member of the House of Representatives for Tokyo 8th district) (Kinmirai Seiji Kenkyūkai)
- Shinya Izumi (Member of the House of Councillors from National PR block) (Atarashii Nami)
- Tetsuma Esaki (Member of the House of Representatives for Aichi 10th district) (Atarashii Nami)
- Kiyoko Ono (Member of the House of Councillors from National PR block) (Shisuikai)
- Yoshinori Ohno (Member of the House of Representatives for Kagawa 3rd district) (Kinmirai Seiji Kenkyūkai)
- Takashi Sasagawa (Member of the House of Representatives for Gunma 2nd district) (Heiseiken)
- Yoshitaka Shindō (Member of the House of Representatives for Saitama 2nd district) (Heiseiken)
- Shuzen Tanigawa (Member of the House of Councillors from Osaka) (Seiwakai)
- Tadayoshi Nagashima (Member of the House of Representatives for Hokuriku-Shin'etsu PR block) (Shisuikai)
- Koya Nishikawa (Member of the House of Representatives for Northern Kanto PR block) (Shisuikai)
- Chieko Nōno (Member of the House of Councillors from National PR block) (Seiwakai)
- Toshikatsu Matsuoka (Member of the House of Representatives for Kumamoto 3rd district) (Shisuikai)
- Kensei Mizote (Member of the House of Councillors from Hiroshima) (Shin Zaisei Kenkyūkai)
- Yoshirō Mori (Member of the House of Representatives for Ishikawa 2nd district) (Seiwakai)
- Taimei Yamaguchi (Member of the House of Representatives for Saitama 10th district) (Heiseiken)
- Yūji Yamamoto (Member of the House of Representatives for Kōchi 3rd district) (Banchōken)
Tarō Asō

Leader of recommenders

- Yoshitada Konoike (Member of the House of Councillors from Hyōgo) (no faction)

Campaign Manager

- Kunio Hatoyama (Member of the House of Representatives for Fukuoka 6th district) (Heiseiken)

Recommenders

- Katsuhito Asano (Member of the House of Councillors from Aichi) (Daiyukai)
- Tomomi Inada (Member of the House of Representatives for Fukui 1st district) (Seiwakai)
- Takeshi Iwaya (Member of the House of Representatives for Ōita 3rd district) (Daiyukai)
- Akinori Eto (Member of the House of Representatives for Aomori 2nd district) (Banchōken)
- Nobuhiko Endō (Member of the House of Representatives for Kyushu PR block) (no faction)
- Toyoaki Ota (Member of the House of Councillors from Fukushima) (no faction)
- Chubee Kagita (Member of the House of Representatives for Kinki PR block) (no faction)
- Kazuyasu Shiina (Member of the House of Councillors from Chiba) (Shisuikai)
- Shun'ichi Suzuki (Member of the House of Representatives for Iwate 2nd district) (Shin Zaisei Kenkyūkai)
- Tsuneo Suzuki (Member of the House of Representatives for Kanagawa 7th district) (Daiyukai)
- Tōru Toida (Member of the House of Representatives for Hyōgo 11th district) (Heiseiken)
- Kyoko Nishikawa (Member of the House of Representatives for Fukuoka 10th district) (Shisuikai)
- Yoshiaki Harada (Member of the House of Representatives for Fukuoka 5th district) (Kinmirai Seiji Kenkyūkai)
- Tatsuharu Mawatari (Member of the House of Representatives for Tōkai PR block) (Heiseiken)
- Jun Matsumoto (Member of the House of Representatives for Kanagawa 1st district) (Daiyukai)
- Masaji Matsuyama (Member of the House of Councillors from Fukuoka) (Shin Zaisei Kenkyūkai)
- Asahiko Mihara (Member of the House of Representatives for Kyushu PR block) (Heiseiken)
- Eisuke Mori (Member of the House of Representatives for Chiba 11th district) (Daiyukai)
Sadakazu Tanigaki

Leader of recommenders

- Ryotaro Tanose (Member of the House of Representatives for Nara 4th district) (Kinmirai Seiji Kenkyūkai)

Campaign Manager

- Takeshi Noda (Member of the House of Representatives for Kumamoto 2nd district) (Kinmirai Seiji Kenkyūkai)

Recommenders

- Ichiro Aisawa (Member of the House of Representatives for Okayama 1st district) (Yūrinkai)
- Masatoshi Abe (Member of the House of Councillors from Yamagata) (Yūrinkai)
- Kyoko Izawa (Member of the House of Representatives for Kinki PR block) (no faction)
- Yamato Inaba (Member of the House of Representatives for Niigata 3rd district) (Kinmirai Seiji Kenkyūkai)
- Yasuhiro Ozato (Member of the House of Representatives for Kagoshima 4th district) (Yūrinkai)
- Yoshito Kajiya (Member of the House of Councillors from Kagoshima) (Yūrinkai)
- Koichi Kato (Member of the House of Representatives for Yamagata 3rd district) (Yūrinkai)
- Tokio Kano (Member of the House of Councillors from National PR block) (Yūrinkai)
- Koichi Kishi (Member of the House of Councillors from Yamagata) (Yūrinkai)
- Masazumi Gotoda (Member of the House of Representatives for Tokushima 3rd district) (Heiseiken)
- Tsutomu Sato (Member of the House of Representatives for Tochigi 4th district) (Yūrinkai)
- Koichiro Shimizu (Member of the House of Representatives for Kinki PR block) (Shin Zaisei Kenkyūkai)
- Masaki Doi (Member of the House of Representatives for Tōkai PR block) (Yūrinkai)
- Gen Nakatani (Member of the House of Representatives for Kōchi 2nd district) (Yūrinkai)
- Yoshitsugu Harada (Member of the House of Representatives for Shizuoka 2nd district) (Yūrinkai)
- Norio Mitsuya (Member of the House of Representatives for Mie 5th district) (Yūrinkai)
- Seiichiro Murakami (Member of the House of Representatives for Ehime 2nd district) (Banchōken)
- Koichi Yamamoto (Member of the House of Representatives for Ehime 4th district) (Yūrinkai)

Number of recommenders by factions

Candidates	Shinzo Abe	Tarō Asō	Sadakazu Tanigaki
Atarashii Nami	2	0	0
Banchō Seisaku Kenkyūjo	3	1	1
Heisei Kenkyūkai	3	4	1
Daiyukai	0	5	0
Kinmirai Seiji Kenkyūkai	3	1	3
Seiwa Seisaku Kenkyūkai	3	1	0
Shin Zaisei Kenkyūkai	2	2	1
Shisuikai	4	2	0
Yūrinkai	0	0	13
No faction	0	4	1

== Results ==
Full result
Candidate	Diet members		Party members				Total points	
Candidate	Votes	%	Popular votes	%	Allocated votes	%	Votes	%
Shinzo Abe 当	267	66.42%	393,899	60.20%	197	65.67%	464	66.10%
Tarō Asō	69	17.16%	163,582	25.00%	67	22.33%	136	19.37%
Sadakazu Tanigaki	66	16.42%	96,861	14.80%	36	12.00%	102	14.53%
Total	402	100.00%	654,342	100.00%	300	100.00%	702	100.00%
Valid votes	402	99.75%	654,342		300	100.00%	702	99.86%
Invalid and blank votes	1	0.25%			0	0.00%	1	0.14%
Turnout	403	100.00%			300	100.00%	703	100.00%
Registered voters	403	100.00%			300	100.00%	703	100.00%

=== Results of Party Members' Votes by Prefectures ===
Results of Party Members' Votes by Prefectures
Prefectures	Shinzo Abe			Tarō Asō			Sadakazu Tanigaki		
Prefectures	Votes	%		Votes	%		Votes	%	
Aichi	14,387	52.0%	6	9,448	34.1%	3	3,841	13.9%	1
Akita	4,946	66.1%	4	1,821	24.3%	1	715	9.6%	0
Aomori	3,094	50.0%	3	2,617	42.3%	2	475	7.7%	0
Chiba	6,924	57.1%	4	4,104	33.8%	2	1,105	9.1%	0
Ehime	14,716	62.6%	6	4,177	17.8%	1	4,597	19.6%	2
Fukui	5,822	67.7%	4	2,028	23.6%	1	753	8.7%	0
Fukuoka	2,281	15.8%	1	11,611	80.5%	5	531	3.7%	0
Fukushima	7,442	69.2%	5	1,957	18.2%	1	1,358	12.6%	0
Gifu	14,880	57.9%	5	7,993	31.1%	3	2,816	11.0%	1
Gunma	9,878	67.6%	5	2,926	20.0%	1	1,810	12.4%	1
Hiroshima	20,163	72.6%	7	4,852	17.5%	1	2,739	9.9%	1
Hokkaido	12,831	57.9%	5	4,988	22.5%	2	4,336	19.6%	2
Hyōgo	10,623	69.2%	5	2,785	18.1%	1	1,956	12.7%	1
Ibaraki	14,865	53.0%	6	11,201	39.9%	5	1,979	7.1%	0
Ishikawa	15,989	80.7%	7	2,377	12.0%	1	1,443	7.3%	0
Iwate	4,436	61.7%	4	2,118	29.4%	1	642	8.9%	0
Kagawa	8,914	68.5%	4	2,184	16.8%	1	1,908	14.7%	1
Kagoshima	6,708	51.8%	4	2,752	21.3%	1	3,488	26.9%	2
Kanagawa	15,408	56.0%	6	10,047	36.5%	3	2,051	7.5%	0
Kōchi	3,164	46.9%	2	1,303	19.3%	1	2,280	33.8%	2
Kumamoto	6,225	57.1%	4	2,456	22.5%	1	2,230	20.4%	1
Kyoto	3,948	31.9%	2	633	5.1%	0	7,785	63.0%	4
Mie	4,185	50.2%	3	1,711	20.6%	1	2,434	29.2%	1
Miyagi	6,467	73.2%	4	1,392	15.7%	1	977	11.1%	0
Miyazaki	3,506	51.9%	3	2,727	40.4%	2	524	7.7%	0
Nagano	6,704	69.8%	4	1,676	17.4%	1	1,229	12.8%	0
Nagasaki	5,300	48.5%	3	4,913	44.9%	3	723	6.6%	0
Nara	3,305	56.8%	3	642	11.0%	0	1,871	32.2%	1
Niigata	9,538	55.1%	4	3,720	21.5%	1	4,052	23.4%	2
Ōita	4,142	45.0%	2	4,489	48.8%	3	572	6.2%	0
Okayama	6,813	54.0%	4	1,684	13.4%	0	4,105	32.6%	2
Okinawa	1,392	69.8%	3	304	15.3%	0	297	14.9%	0
Osaka	12,875	60.0%	5	6,472	30.2%	3	2,092	9.8%	0
Saga	3,089	43.8%	2	3,185	45.2%	3	778	11.0%	0
Saitama	13,645	73.3%	7	3,067	16.5%	1	1,898	10.2%	0
Shiga	5,535	58.4%	3	1,118	11.8%	0	2,823	29.8%	2
Shimane	8,955	68.0%	5	2,839	21.6%	1	1,377	10.4%	0
Shizuoka	15,163	68.7%	6	3,322	15.0%	1	3,600	16.3%	1
Tochigi	6,122	66.9%	4	1,377	15.0%	0	1,661	18.1%	1
Tokushima	2,293	47.4%	2	1,335	27.6%	1	1,211	25.0%	1
Tokyo	24,000	61.5%	8	11,444	29.3%	3	3,603	9.2%	1
Tottori	3,363	60.4%	3	1,496	26.8%	1	713	12.8%	0
Toyama	16,642	68.3%	6	5,318	21.8%	2	2,408	9.9%	1
Wakayama	5,130	79.8%	4	696	10.8%	0	603	9.4%	0
Yamagata	2,220	26.0%	1	663	7.8%	0	5,653	66.2%	4
Yamaguchi	13,023	95.0%	6	359	2.6%	0	323	2.4%	0
Yamanashi	2,848	61.9%	3	1,255	27.3%	1	496	10.8%	0
Total	393,899	60.2%	197	163,582	25.0%	67	96,861	14.8%	36
