= Factions in the Liberal Democratic Party (Japan) =

Japanese political factions

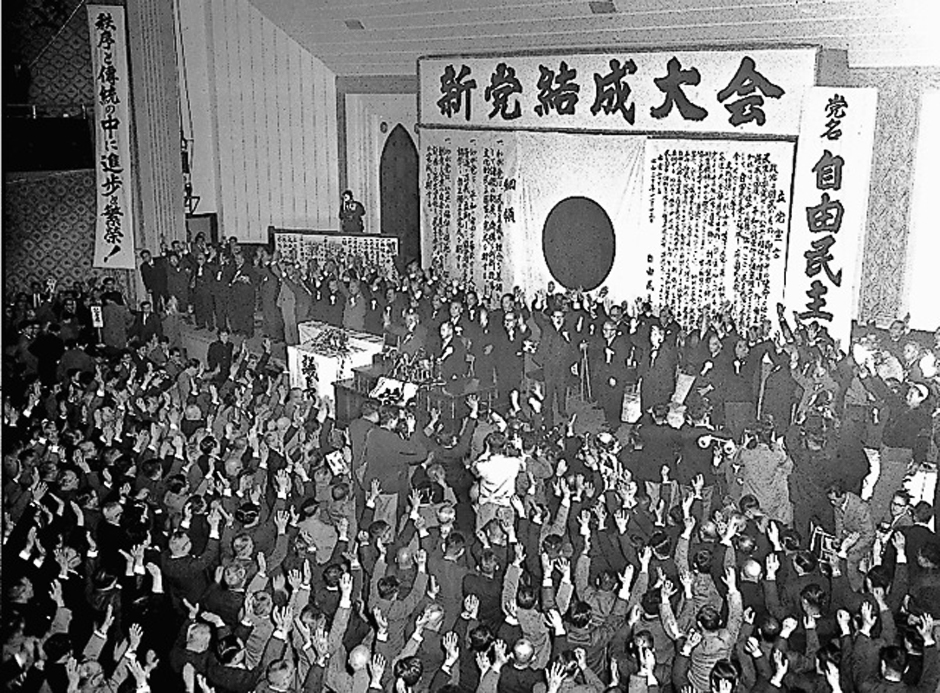
Formation of LDP, 15 November 1955

Factions (Japanese: 派閥, Hepburn: habatsu) are an accepted part of the Liberal Democratic Party (LDP), the ruling party of Japan, which began with eight formal factions when it was first formed by merger in 1955. A Political faction may be defined as a sub-group within a larger organization. While factions characterize other political parties in Pacific Asia, Japanese factionalism is distinguished by its stability and institutionalization. Although factions reconstitute themselves from time to time, the habatsu active today can be traced back to their 1955 roots, a testament to the stability and institutionalized nature of Liberal Democratic Party factions.

Faction leaders offer faction members services without which the followers would find it difficult to survive politically, in exchange for the members' support. Leaders provide funds for the day-to-day operation of Diet members' offices and staff, as well as financial support during expensive election campaigns. The operating allowances provided by the government are inadequate, even after the introduction of public funding in 1994. The leader also introduces his followers to influential bureaucrats and business people, thus helping faction members respond to their constituents' needs. Due to the LDP's dominance of Japanese politics, factional politics play a key role in deciding Japan's leadership, and the Cabinet is generally formed along factional lines.

As a result of the 2023–2024 Japanese slush fund scandal, attempts to dissolve the faction system began under Prime Minister Fumio Kishida. These have resulted in all but one faction, the Shikōkai, being dissolved.

== Current factions ==
There is currently only one faction (Shikōkai) in the LDP; and while most factions have official titles, in the Japanese media they are usually referred to by the names of their current leaders.

Name	Ideology	Political position	Leader	Members
Shikōkai; 志公会	Conservatism; Big tent	Centre to Right-wing	Tarō Asō	45

=== Shikōkai ===
This is the largest and currently only faction, led by Tarō Asō, the former Prime Minister and Deputy Prime Minister. Notable members of the Shikōkai faction are Taro Kono, the 2021 LDP leadership candidate and son of Yōhei Kōno, and Akira Amari, former LDP secretary general (who currently holds a proportional block seat after losing in his own constituency in the 2021 election). It was established in 2017 by merging the following two factions:

==== Ikōkai ====
Formerly led by Yōhei Kōno, who was the Speaker of the House of Representatives from 2003 to 2009. Once part of the former Katō faction, though this group split off during the mid-1990s. It was more critical towards Koizumi and more reformist and pro-Chinese than the Machimura faction's conservative nationalists, who followed classical economics.

==== Banchō Seisaku Kenkyūjo ====
Formerly led by Masahiko Komura. As Komura retired, leadership was handed to Tadamori Ōshima before he took the role of House of Representatives Speaker in 2015. In turn, his replacement, Akiko Santō became the first ever female faction head. However, with few faction members, Santo was unable to exercise a great deal of influence over intra-party affairs, so she decided to join forces by merging hers with Aso's faction in 2017.

== History ==
=== Pre-LDP: Hatoyama–Yoshida rivalry (1946–1955) ===
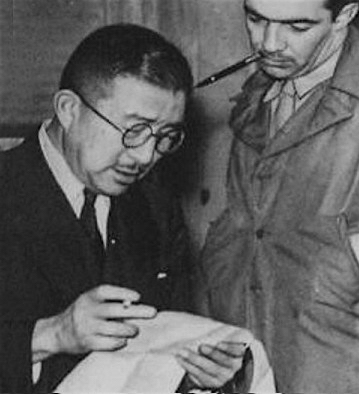
Hatoyama learns of his being purged, 3 May 1946.

LDP factionalism began in its precursor parties due to political developments during the Occupation period. Although Ichirō Hatoyama led his Liberal Party to victory in the 1946 Japanese general election (10 April), before he could assume power, he was purged by the Supreme Commander for the Allied Powers as someone who had too many connections with the militarist past. Hatoyama handed control of the party to Shigeru Yoshida, who promised to hand the reins back when Hatoyama was rehabilitated. Unlike Hatoyama, who came from a family of politicians, Yoshida was a bureaucrat, and packed the party with bureaucrats, giving rise to kanryo (bureaucrat) and tojin (party man) factions. Hatoyama was depurged on 6 August 1951, only to find Yoshida unwilling to yield control. Thus, on 24 November 1954, Hatoyama helped form a new Democratic Party through a merger of a faction of Hatoyama loyalists who defected from Yoshida's party, and the Kaishintō (Reform Party). In 1955, when the Liberal Party (Yoshida) and the Democratic Party (Hatoyama) merged to form the Liberal Democratic Party, each party brought with it four factions, for a total of eight factions in the new party. This began the "1955 System", namely, decades of LDP domination of Japanese politics.

=== Historical factions ===
Historically, the most powerful and aggressive faction leader in the LDP was Kakuei Tanaka, whose Mokuyo Club factions dual-house strength in the early 1980s exceeded 110. His followers remained loyal despite the fact that he had been convicted of receiving ¥500 million (nearly US$4 million) in bribes from Lockheed (the Lockheed scandal) to facilitate the purchase of its passenger aircraft by All Nippon Airways and that he had formally withdrawn from the LDP. Tanaka and his most bitter factional rival, Takeo Fukuda, were a study in contrasts. Tanaka was a roughhewn wheeler-dealer with a primary school education who had made a fortune in the construction industry; Fukuda was an elite product of the University of Tokyo Law Faculty and a career bureaucrat.

In the face of Fukuda's strong opposition, Tanaka engineered the selections of prime ministers Masayoshi Ōhira (1978–80) and Zenkō Suzuki (1980–82). The accession of Yasuhiro Nakasone to the prime ministership in 1982 would also not have occurred without Tanaka's support. As a result, Nakasone, at that time a politically weak figure, was nicknamed "Tanakasone". But Tanaka's faction was dealt a grave blow when one of his subordinates, Noboru Takeshita, decided to form a breakaway group.

The LDP faction system was closely fitted to the House of Representatives' medium-sized, multiple-member election districts. The party usually ran more than one candidate in each of these constituencies to maintain its lower house majority, and these candidates were from different factions. During an election campaign, the LDP, in a real sense, ran not only against the opposition but also against itself. In fact, intraparty competition within one election district was often more bitter than interparty competition, with two or more LDP candidates vying for the same block of conservative votes. For example, in the House of Representatives election of February 18, 1990, three LDP and three opposition candidates competed for five seats in a southwestern prefecture. Two of the LDP candidates publicly expressed bitterness over the entry of the third, a son of the prefectural governor. Local television showed supporters of one of the LDP candidates cheering loudly when the governor's son was edged out for the fifth seat by a Komeito candidate.

=== Factions dissolved in 2024 ===
As a result of the 2023–2024 Japanese slush fund scandal, four major factions and one minor faction announced their dissolution in January 2024. The details of these factions at the time of their dissolution is given below.

Name	Ideology	Political position	Leader at dissolution	Members at dissolution
Seiwa Seisaku Kenkyūkai; 清和政策研究会	Japanese nationalism; National conservatism	Centre-right to far-right	Collective leadership	98
Kōchikai; 宏池会	Moderate conservatism	Centre to centre-right	Fumio Kishida	46
Heisei Kenkyūkai; 平成研究会	Conservatism	Centre to right-wing	Toshimitsu Motegi	40
Shisuikai; 志帥会	Conservatism; Big tent	Centre-right to Right-wing	Toshihiro Nikai	39
Kinmirai Seiji Kenkyūkai; 近未来政治研究会	?	Centre-right	Hiroshi Moriyama	8
Suigetsukai; 水月会	Centrist Moderate conservative Reformist	Centre to centre-right	Shigeru Ishiba	7

==== Seiwa Seisaku Kenkyūkai ====
The largest faction of the LDP was led by former prime minister Shinzo Abe from 11 November 2021 until his assassination in 2022. He had replaced ex-Chief Cabinet Secretary Hiroyuki Hosoda as leader as Hosoda became the new Speaker of the House of Representatives. Since Abe's assassination and up until the faction was dissolved, the faction was run under collective leadership.

The faction's founder was Takeo Fukuda in 1962. It was a pro-classical economics, nationalist (it included many Japanese Neoconservatives) and conservative faction. Shinzo Abe's deceased father Shintaro Abe was an ex-leader of this faction (1986–1991). Ex-Prime Ministers Junichiro Koizumi and Yoshirō Mori also formerly led the faction. As of 2004 it had overtaken the Hashimoto faction in the more powerful Lower House, and after the 2007 Councilor's election, the Seiwa Political-analysis Council has become the largest faction in the party.

Following allegations of the existence of an illegal slush fund created by faction members, including ministers, in December 2023, all faction members were removed from cabinet, and the faction announced its dissolution on 19 January 2024.

- Supported by the Japan Business Federation, established Japan Democratic Party bureaucracy, and the Japan War-Bereaved Families Association.
- This faction promoted decreasing taxes for high income taxpayers and large companies, maintaining a strong alliance with the United States, visits to Yasukuni Shrine in order to garner support from nationalist voters without any special interest payments, reforming the constitution to support a standing military, free trade for car exports, and gradual privatization of Japan Post.
- Founded by Nobusuke Kishi. Succeeded by Takeo Fukuda, Junichiro Koizumi, Shinzō Abe, Yasuo Fukuda.

==== Kōchikai ====
This faction was lead from 2012 to 2024 by Fumio Kishida, who was Prime Minister from 2021 to 2024. Mitsuo Horiuchi was co-leader until he temporarily left the faction in October 2006. This group was under the leadership of Koichi Kato until a split in 2001, after Kato led a failed revolt against the prime minister Yoshirō Mori which backfired and damaged his grip over the faction, resulting in a split between pro-Kato and anti-Kato members. It was moderate on internal and foreign affairs but more conservative and still moderately nationalist. It was critical towards Junichiro Koizumi. This faction historically had been the most prestigious faction, with many of its members drawn from the upper-ranks of the elite bureaucracy. The faction dissolved on 18 January 2024 due to being the ruling faction at the time of the slush fund scandal.

- Supported by the established Liberal Party bureaucracy, white-collar workers, doctors, small merchants and small factory owners.
- This faction led economic development from 1960 to 1988. They promoted international cooperation with China and Korea, a government bond/consumption Tax for national medical care and national banks which financially support small firms, as well as a free trade Policy.
- Founded by bureaucrat-turned-politician Hayato Ikeda. Succeeded by Kiichi Miyazawa, Sadakazu Tanigaki, and Makoto Koga.

==== Heisei Kenkyūkai ====
This faction was led by former LDP Secretary General Toshimitsu Motegi, following the death of Wataru Takeshita who was chairman from 2018 until his death in September 2021. Takeshita previously replaced Fukushiro Nukaga who had served as chairman since September 2009. Previous leaders also included ex-PM Ryutaro Hashimoto. Previously, the faction was known as the Takeshita Faction (経世会, Keiseikai), after former prime minister Noboru Takeshita.

It was a Keynesian, right-liberal and pro-China faction. It had strong influence on bureaucrats. Ex-PM Hashimoto and the entire faction were hit with a scandal where the faction had apparently taken money from the Japan Dental Association. Hashimoto resigned as chairman of the faction in 2004 and retired from politics the following year.

Since the leadership of Junichiro Koizumi, it was split with members who supported Koizumi and a minority of the faction who did not. It was also observed that leaders of this faction were unable to maintain factional unity, particularly during the LDP presidential election of 2018. Because it was the largest in numbers, accusations of influence peddling and pork-barrel politics were rife. It is a descendant of the Tanaka faction. The faction dissolved in response to the slush fund scandal, despite not being directly implicated.

- Supported by local farmers, the construction industry, blue-collar workers, the defense industry, Japan Post workers, and discriminated village peoples.
- This faction led economic development from 1960 to 1988. They promoted international cooperation with China and Korea, a gasoline tax, construction of highways/shinkansen, and protection of small farmers, Japan Post workers, and discriminated peoples.
- Founded by diplomat Shigeru Yoshida. Succeeded by Eisaku Satō, Kakuei Tanaka, Takeshita Noboru, Shin Kanemaru, Obuchi Keizo, Tanisuke Watanuki, Ryutaro Hashimoto, Yuji Tsushima, Fukushiro Nukaga and Wataru Takeshita.

==== Shisuikai ====
This faction was led by Toshihiro Nikai, who stepped down as LDP Secretary General in 2021. It is considered by many to be the most pro-Chinese and right-wing grouping among the major factions, though it is keynesian and right-liberal in general and pro-international cooperation. This faction had effectively been weakened since Shizuka Kamei and other members left the party to establish the People's New Party in opposition to Koizumi's postal privatisation bills. The faction dissolved on 19 January 2024 after being implicated in the slush fund scandal.

==== Kinmirai Seiji Kenkyūkai ====
This faction was led by Hiroshi Moriyama. It was formerly led by Nobuteru Ishihara until he lost his seat in the 2021 general election. Ishihara attempted to expand the faction's membership, but was unsuccessful. As he previously was a strong challenger against Shinzo Abe for the leadership of the LDP in 2012, the faction did not enjoy a great deal of influence in intra-party machinations. Kinmirai Seiji Kenkyūkai and Shisuikai were closely related. The faction dissolved due to the slush fund scandal.

==== Suigetsukai ====
Led by Shigeru Ishiba, former LDP president and Prime Minister from 2024 to 2025, who was a member of Heisei Kenkyūkai until 2011.

Ishiba had long stood against factionalism in the LDP, but he formed his own faction to increase his support base. He started an informal group of 20 independents that met regularly, before Ishiba relented and finally formed his faction at the members' behest. This small but steady group continued to rally behind Ishiba since its formation in 2015, but Ishiba's failure to win the party presidency in 2020 contributed to his decision to step down as faction head. Following a decrease in members after the 2021 Lower House election, the Ishiba faction downgraded itself back to a less formalized "group" with only 12 members, which have since decreased to 7.

=== List of major historical factions ===
The LDP's factions can loosely be grouped into two main currents. They developed in the years following the "conservative merger" (hoshu gōdō) of 1955 when Shigeru Yoshida's Liberal Party and Ichirō Hatoyama's Japan Democratic Party united to form the LDP. Factions of former Liberals are called the "conservative mainstream" (保守本流, hoshu honryū) while the factions of former Democrats are called the "conservative anti-mainstream" (保守傍流, hoshu bōryū). It is known that the "conservative mainstream" is relatively more moderate compared to the "conservative anti-mainstream", especially in matters of nationalism.

Existing factions and leaders are in bold.

==== Ex-Liberals ("conservative mainstream") ====
- "Yoshida school" (Yoshida gakkō) centered around ex-bureaucrats loyal to Yoshida
  - Kōchikai (Ikeda → Maeo → Ōhira → Suzuki → Miyazawa → Katō faction), split following the "Katō rebellion" (Katō no ran) against party president Yoshirō Mori in 2000
    - Kōchikai (Katō → Ozato → Tanigaki faction) of Katō loyalists, remerged into the other Kōchikai in 2008
    - Kōchikai (Horiuchi → Niwa-Koga → Koga → Kishida faction), voted against Katō's no-confidence motion in 2000, later reunited under Koga, dissolved following the slush fund scandal
    - Taiyūkai (Kōno faction) → Ikōkai (Asō faction) → **Shikokai** (**Asō** faction), formed by supporters of a second term for Yōhei Kōno in the LDP presidential election of 1995 from the Miyazawa faction
  - Mokuyō Kenkyūkai → Shūzankai → Mokuyō Club → Keiseikai → Heisei Kenkyūkai (Satō → Tanaka → Takeshita → Obuchi → Hashimoto → Tsushima → Nukaga → Takeshita → Motegi faction), dissolved following the slush fund scandal
    - Shūzan Club (Hori faction), merged into the anti-mainstream's Fukuda faction
    - Kaikaku Forum 21 (Hata faction), split off the Takeshita faction in 1992 following the Sagawa Express scandal, voted with the opposition in a no-confidence motion against Kiichi Miyazawa in 1993 and subsequently left the LDP to form the Japan Renewal Party making the LDP lose its lower house majority ahead of the 1993 general election
  - Suiyōkai (Ogata → Ishii faction)
- Hatoyama supporters
  - Hakuseikai (Ōno faction), split into the Murakami → Mizuta faction and the Funada faction, both groups disappeared

==== Ex-Democrats ("conservative anti-mainstream") ====
- Hatoyama supporters
  - Tōkakai → Tōfū Ishin Renmei (Kishi faction) → Yōkakai → Seiwakai → Seiwa Seisaku Kenkyūkai (Fukuda → Abe → Mitsuzuka → Mori → Machimura → Hosoda → Abe faction), dissolved following the slush fund scandal
    - Aiseikai (Fujiyama faction), formed to support Fujiyama's (unsuccessful) runs in the LDP presidential elections of the 1960s
    - Kōyū Club (Kawashima → Shiina), split off from the Kishi faction in 1962, dissolved after Shiina's resignation
  - Shunjūkai (Kōno faction) → Shinsei Dōshikai → Seisaku Kagaku Kenkyūjo (Nakasone → Watanabe faction), without a clear leader following Watanabe's death in 1995, merged with the Kamei group after the formation of Taku Yamasaki's independent faction in 1998
    - Shunjūkai (Kōno → Mori → Sonoda faction), merged into the Fukuda faction after Sonoda had died in 1984
    - Kinmirai Seiji Kenkyūkai (Yamasaki → Ishihara → Moriyama faction)
    - Shisuikai (Murakami → Etō → Kamei → Ibuki → Nikai faction), formed by the remaining Ex-Watanabe faction members and a breakaway group from the Mitsuzuka faction led by Kamei
  - Kayōkai (Ishibashi faction) → Futsukakai (Ishida faction), merged into the Miki faction in 1971
- former Kaishintō (Progressive Party)
  - Seisaku Kondankai (Miki-Matsumura faction) → Banchō Seisaku Kenkyūjo (Miki faction) → Shin-Seisaku Kenkyūkai (Kōmoto faction) → Banchō Seisaku Kenkyūjo (Kōmura → Ōshima → Santō faction) → **Shikokai** (**Asō** faction), merged with Asō's faction Ikōkai to form Shikōkai in 2017.

==== Others ====
- Jiyū Kakushin Dōmei (Nakagawa → Ishihara faction), merged into the Fukuda faction
- Atarashii Nami (Nikai faction), faction of former members of the New Conservative Party, merged into the Ibuki faction in 2009
