= Wataru Takeshita =

Japanese politician (1946–2021)

- 竹下 亘
- Official portrait, 2008

Minister for Reconstruction
- In office 3 September 2014 – 7 October 2015
- Prime Minister: Shinzo Abe
- Preceded by: Takumi Nemoto
- Succeeded by: Tsuyoshi Takagi

Member of the House of Representatives
- In office 25 June 2000 – 17 September 2021
- Preceded by: Noboru Takeshita
- Succeeded by: Yasuhiro Takami
- Constituency: Shimane 2nd

Personal details
- Born: 3 November 1946 Kakeya, Shimane, Japan
- Died: 17 September 2021 (aged 74) Tokyo, Japan
- Party: Liberal Democratic
- Relatives: Noboru Takeshita (brother)
- Education: Keio University

Wataru Takeshita (竹下 亘, Takeshita Wataru; 3 November 1946 – 17 September 2021) was a Japanese politician who served in the House of Representatives in the Diet (national legislature) as a member of the Liberal Democratic Party. A native of Kakeya, Shimane and graduate of Keio University he was elected for the first time in 2000. His elder brother was former prime minister Noboru Takeshita.

Before entering politics in 2000, Takeshita was a reporter with NHK, then began working for his brother as an aide in 1985.

He was the leader of the Heisei Kenkyukai faction from 2018 until his death 3 years later, which supported Yoshihide Suga in the 2020 Liberal Democratic Party of Japan leadership election.

Takeshita was affiliated to the openly revisionist organization Nippon Kaigi. He held an anti-homosexual stance.

In July 2021, Takeshita announced that he would be retiring from politics at the next general election for health reasons, having been diagnosed with esophageal cancer in 2019. He died in office on 17 September 2021.

Political offices
| Preceded by Takumi Nemoto | Minister for Reconstruction; 2014–2015 | Succeeded by Tsuyoshi Takagi |
House of Representatives (Japan)
| Preceded by Takeo Kawamura | Chairman of the Budget Committee; 2016 | Succeeded by Yasukazu Hamada |
Party political offices
| Preceded by Yoshihide Suga | Chief of the Organisation and Movement Headquarters, Liberal Democratic Party; 2012–2014 | Succeeded by Kazunori Tanaka |
| Preceded by Tsutomu Sato | Chairman of the Diet Affairs Committee, Liberal Democratic Party; 2016—2017 | Succeeded by Hiroshi Moriyama |
| Preceded by Hiroyuki Hosoda | Chairman of the General Council, Liberal Democratic Party; 2017—2018 | Succeeded by Katsunobu Kato |
| Preceded by Fukushiro Nukaga | Head of the Heisei Kenkyūkai; 2018—2021 | Succeeded by Toshimitsu Motegi |
