= Wakayama at-large district =

Japan House of Councillors constituency

Wakayama at-large district is a constituency in the House of Councillors of Japan, the upper house of the Diet of Japan (national legislature). It currently elects 2 members to the House of Councillors, 1 per election. The current representatives are:

- Hiroshige Sekō, first elected in 1998. Term ends in 2025. Member of the Liberal Democratic Party.
- Yōsuke Tsuruho, first elected in 1998. Term ends in 2022. Member of the Liberal Democratic Party.

The district has an electorate of 809,547 as of May 2021.
