= Yōsuke Tsuruho =

Japanese politician

- 鶴保 庸介
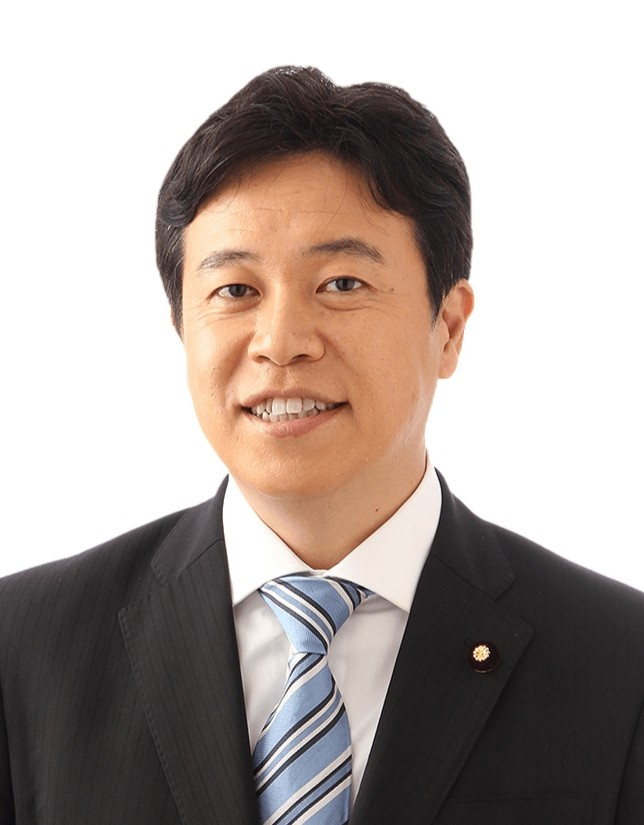
- Official portrait, 2016

Member of the House of Councillors
- Incumbent
- Assumed office 26 July 1998
- Preceded by: Isao Maeda
- Constituency: Wakayama at-large

Personal details
- Born: 5 February 1967 (age 59) Kitakyushu, Fukuoka, Japan
- Party: LDP (since 2002)
- Other political affiliations: NFP (1996–1998); LP (1998–2000); NCP (2000–2002)
- Spouse: Seiko Noda (m. 2001; div. 2006)
- Education: University of Tokyo

Yōsuke Tsuruho (鶴保 庸介, Tsuruho Yōsuke; born February 5, 1967) is a Japanese politician of the Liberal Democratic Party, a member of the House of Councillors in the Diet (national legislature). A native of Osaka and graduate of the University of Tokyo, he was elected to the House of Councillors for the first time in 1998 after running unsuccessfully for the House of Representatives in 1996. He subsequently won two elections for the Japan House of Councilors, Wakayama Prefecture in 2004 and 2010 with 53.83% and 56.79% of the votes respectively.

In 2025, Tsuruho apologized following criticism over his description of the 2024 Noto earthquake as a "fortunate" event that showed how improvements can be made in public services. As a consequence, Tsuhoro lost his position as the chairman of the budget committee in the House of Councillors.
