= Shikōkai =

Shikōkai 志公会
- Leader: Tarō Asō
- Founder: Tarō Asō
- Founded: 3 July 2017
- Preceded by: Banchō Seisaku Kenkyūjo
- Ideology: Conservatism; Big tent
- Type: Liberal Democratic Party faction
- Councillors: 11 / 101
- Representatives: 49 / 316

Shikōkai (Japanese: 志公会) is a faction led by Tarō Asō within the Liberal Democratic Party (LDP). Before the dissolution of other factions, it was the third-largest faction within the LDP. It was established in 2017.

== History ==
It was formed by joining the "Ikōkai (former Aso faction)" led by Tarō Asō and the "Bancho Seisaku Kenkyūjo (Santō faction) led by Akiko Santō in 2017.

After the 2019 House of Councillors election, Santo, a member of the Aso faction, became President of the House of Councillors.

=== 2020 LDP Presidential election ===
In the 2020 LDP presidential election, Shikōkai endorsed Yoshihide Suga. As a result of election, Suga was elected to the President of the Liberal Democratic Party and became the Prime Minister.

=== Bar visit Scandal ===
Some media reported that Jun Matsumoto, former chair of National Public Safety Commission, a member of the Shikōkai, and Aso’s ally, visited eateries including bars in the capital's upscale Ginza district separately at night in defiance of the national government's request for people to refrain from nonessential and nonurgent outings after 8 p.m. amid the coronavirus state of emergency. Following the scandal, Matsumoto left the LDP. Matsumoto then ran as an independent in the 2021 general election, but was defeated by CDP’s Go Shinohara in Kanagawa 1st.

=== 2021 LDP presidential election ===
In the 2021 LDP presidential election, Taro Kono, a member of the Aso faction, announced his candidacy. Meanwhile, Akira Amari and Shun'ichi Suzuki, Asō's brother-in-law, supported Fumio Kishida. Asō feared that the factions would split. As an Shikōkai, a faction endorsed both Kono and Kishida, and left the vote up to the individual members of the Diet to decide. As a result of the election, Kishida was elected to the President of the Liberal Democratic Party.

Kishida appointed Amari as LDP secretary general to thank Asō faction member such as Amari for his support. However, due to the fact that he was dug up for past political scandals, Amari lost his Kamagawa 13th seat in the 2021 general election shortly afterwards, losing to CDP’s Hideshi Futori. Amari won a seat in the Southern Kanto PR block and maintained his position as a member of the House of Representatives, but was forced to resign as secretary general.

=== Post presidential election split ===
In February 2022, four members of the House of Representatives, former Minister of Internal Affairs and Communications Tsutomu Sato, Nobuhide Minorikawa, Toshiko Abe, and Hideki Niwa, announced their withdrawal from the Aso faction. Sato was close to former PM Suga and supported Kono in the 2021 LDP presidential election. As a result, Asō faction retreated from a second faction to a third faction within the party. It is also reported that the reason behind Sato's departure was the return of Matsumoto Jun, who left the LDP due to the scandal.

=== Sole remaining faction ===
In January 2024, as LDP faction's political funds scandal was discovered and other factions decided to dissolve, Asō faction members discussed their future actions. Many of its members insisted on survival and left the response to leader Asō. However, former Defense Minister Takeshi Iwaya, who opposed the faction's survival, withdrew from the faction. Eventually, Shikōkai survived and became the only faction within the LDP.

=== 2024 LDP presidential election ===
As in the previous election, Taro Kono, a member of the Shikōkai, announced his candidacy in the 2024 LDP presidential election. Shikōkai members supported Kono, Yōko Kamikawa, or other candidates and Shikōkai did not endorsed any particular candidate as a faction.

=== After 2026 general election ===
After the 2026 general election, many Diet members participated in the Shikōkai and became a force with 60 members. On the other hand, when former Justice Minister Eisuke Mori became Speaker of the House of Representatives, he left the Shikōkai according to custom.

== Shikōkai faction heads ==
No.	Image	Faction head	Years
1		Tarō Asō	2017–

== Membership ==
=== Executives ===
Shikōkai faction executives
Leader	Tarō Asō
Acting leader	Akinori Eto
Acting leader	Kazunori Tanaka
Deputy leader	Shun'ichi Suzuki
Deputy leader	Shunichi Yamaguchi
Secretary General	Vacant
Secretary Director	Shinji Inoue

=== House of Representatives ===
49 members
Name	Birth date and Age	Constituency	Current positions or former positions	Notes
Hiroki Abe	December 15, 1961 (age 64)	Kyushu PR	None	
Jiro Akama	March 27, 1968 (age 58)	Kanagawa 14th	Chair of the National Public Safety Commission (2025–present) Previous offices held: State Minister of Cabinet Office (2016–2017); State Minister for Internal Affairs and Communications (2016-2017); Parliamentary Vice-Minister for Internal Affairs and Communications (2014-2015)	
Tarō Asō	September 20, 1940 (age 85)	Fukuoka 8th	Vice President of the Liberal Democratic Party (2021-2024; 2025–present) Previous offices held: Prime Minister of Japan (2008–2009); President of the Liberal Democratic Party (2008–2009); Senior Advisor of the Liberal Democratic Party (2024–2025); Deputy Prime Minister of Japan (2012–2021); Minister of Finance (2012–2021); Secretary-General of the Liberal Democratic Party (2007; 2008); Minister for Foreign Affairs (2005-2007); Minister for Internal Affairs and Communications (2003-2005); Chair of the LDP Policy Research Council (2001-2003); Minister of State for Economic and Fiscal Policy (2001); Director-General of the Economic Planning Agency (1996-1997)	
Tatsunori Ibayashi	July 18, 1976 (age 49)	Shizuoka 2nd	None Previous offices held: State Minister of Cabinet Office (2023-2024); Parliamentary Vice-Minister of Cabinet Office (2016-2017); Parliamentary Vice-Minister for the Environment (2016-2017)	
Yosei Ide	November 21, 1977 (age 48)	Nagano 3rd	None Previous offices held: State Minister of Education, Culture, Sports, Science and Technology (2022-2023)	
Soichiro Imaeda	February 18, 1984 (age 42)	Aichi 14th	State Minister for Digital Transformation (2025-present); State Minister of Cabinet Office (2025-present) Previous offices held: State Minister of Education, Culture, Sports, Science and Technology (2023-2024); Parliamentary Secretary for Finance (2017-2018)	
Shinji Inoue	October 7, 1969 (age 56)	Tokyo 25th	None Previous offices held: Minister of State for Special Missions (2020-2021); State Minister of Cabinet Office (2012-2014; 2015-2016); State Minister of Environment (2012-2014; 2015-2016)	
Takahiro Inoue	April 2, 1962 (age 64)	Fukuoka 1st	Special Advisor to the Prime Minister of Japan (2025-present) Previous offices held: State Minister of Finance (2022-2023); Parliamentary Secretary for Finance (2019-2020); Special Advisor to the Minister of Finance (2018-2019)	
Shintaro Ito	May 6, 1953 (age 73)	Tohoku PR	None Previous offices held: Minister of the Environment (2023–2024); State Minister for Foreign Affairs (2008-2009); Parliamentary Vice-Minister for Foreign Affairs (2005-2006)	
Arfiya Eri	October 16, 1988 (age 37)	Chiba 5th	Parliamentary Vice-Minister for Foreign Affairs (2024-present)	
Akinori Eto	October 12, 1955 (age 70)	Tohoku PR	None Previous offices held: Minister of Defense (2014); State Minister of Defense (2007-2008; 2012-2013); Parliamentary Vice-Minister of Cabinet Office (2004-2005)	
Yui Kanazawa	October 23, 1990 (age 35)	Kanagawa 20th	None	
Masami Kawano	June 30, 1961 (age 64)	Kyushu PR	None	
Keiro Kitagami	February 1, 1967 (age 59)	Kyoto 4th	None Previous offices held: Special Advisor to the Prime Minister of Japan (2012); Parliamentary Vice-Minister of Cabinet Office (2012); Parliamentary Vice-Minister for Economy, Trade and Industry (2011-2012)	
Masahiro Kōmura	November 14, 1970 (age 55)	Yamaguchi 1st	None Previous offices held: State Minister of Justice (2024–2025); Parliamentary Vice-Minister for Foreign Affairs (2023-2024); Parliamentary Secretary for Finance (2021-2022)	
Taro Kono	January 10, 1963 (age 63)	Kanagawa 15th	None Previous offices held: Minister for Digital Transformation (2022–2024); Minister for Administrative Reform and Regulatory Reform (2015–2016; 2020–2021); Minister of Defense (2019–2020); Minister for Foreign Affairs (2017–2019); Chair of the National Public Safety Commission (2015–2016); State Minister of Justice (2005-2006); Parliamentary Vice-Minister for Internal Affairs and Communications (2002)	
Shozo Kudō	December 8, 1964 (age 61)	Aichi 4th	None Previous offices held: State Minister of Cabinet Office (2023-2024); Parliamentary Vice-Minister for Land, Infrastructure, Transport and Tourism (2018-2019)	
Karen Makishima	November 1, 1976 (age 49)	Kanagawa 17th	None Previous offices held: Minister for Digital Transformation (2021-2022); Parliamentary Vice-Minister of Cabinet Office (2015-2016)	
Hideki Matsushita	September 6, 1990 (age 35)	Hokkaido 9th	None	
Natsuko Maruo	February 25, 1982 (age 44)	Kanagawa 1st	None	
Asato Mihara	December 8, 1977 (age 48)	Kyushu PR （Fukuoka 9th）	None	
Kiyoko Morihara	July 23, 1980 (age 45)	Tokyo PR	None	
Jun Mukōyama	November 19, 1983 (age 42)	Hokkaido 8th	Parliamentary Vice-Minister for Internal Affairs and Communications (2025-present)	
Nagisa Muraki	February 14, 2000 (age 26)	Hokkaido PR	None	
Yoji Muto	October 18, 1955 (age 70)	Gifu 3rd	None Previous offices held: Minister of Economy, Trade and Industry (2024-2025); State Minister of Cabinet Office (2017-2018); State Minister of Economy, Trade and Industry (2017-2018); State Minister for Foreign Affairs (2015-2016); Parliamentary Vice-Minister for Internal Affairs and Communications (2014-2015)	
Keiko Nagaoka	December 8, 1953 (age 72)	Northern Kanto PR （Ibaraki 7th）	None Previous offices held: Minister of Education, Culture, Sports, Science and Technology (2022-2023); State Minister of Education, Culture, Sports, Science and Technology (2018-2019); State Minister of Health, Labour and Welfare (2014-2015); Parliamentary Secretary for Agriculture, Forestry and Fisheries (2006-2007)	
Yasumasa Nagasaka	April 10, 1957 (age 69)	Aichi 9th	State Minister of Health, Labour and Welfare (2025-present) Previous offices held: State Minister of Cabinet Office (2020–2021); State Minister of Economy, Trade and Industry (2020–2021); Parliamentary Vice-Minister of Cabinet Office (2017-2018); Parliamentary Vice-Minister for Reconstruction (2017-2018)	
Takamoto Nakagawa	February 25, 1967 (age 59)	Tōkai PR	None Previous offices held: Parliamentary Vice-Minister for Internal Affairs and Communications (2022-2023)	
Hiroyuki Nakamura	February 23, 1961 (age 65)	Hokkaido 4th	State Minister of Education, Culture, Sports, Science and Technology (2025-present) Previous offices held: State Minister of Agriculture, Forestry and Fisheries (2021-2022); Parliamentary Vice-Minister for Education, Culture, Sports, Science and Technology (2018-2019)	
Kenji Nakanishi	January 4, 1964 (age 62)	Kanagawa 3rd	None Previous offices held: State Minister of Finance (2020-2021)	
Norihiro Nakayama	September 16, 1968 (age 57)	Shikoku PR	None Previous offices held: State Minister of Land, Infrastructure, Transport and Tourism (2021-2022); Parliamentary Vice-Minister for Foreign Affairs (2019-2020)	
Hirobumi Niki	May 23, 1966 (age 60)	Tokushima 1st	State Minister of Health, Labour and Welfare (2024-present)	
Yasuhiro Okamoto	March 13, 1982 (age 44)	Aichi 5th	None	
Hiroaki Saito	December 8, 1976 (age 49)	Niigata 3rd	None Previous offices held: State Minister of Finance (2024-2025); Parliamentary Vice-Minister for Internal Affairs and Communications (2019-2020)	
Takakazu Seto	August 2, 1965 (age 60)	Shikoku PR （Kagawa 2nd）	State Minister of Cabinet Office (2024-present); State Minister for Reconstruction (2025-present) Previous offices held: Parliamentary Secretary for Finance (2023-2024)	
Keisuke Suzuki	February 9, 1977 (age 49)	Kanagawa 7th	None Previous offices held: Minister of Justice (2024-2025); State Minister for Foreign Affairs (2019-2020); State Minister of Finance (2018-2019); Parliamentary Vice-Minister of Cabinet Office (2014-2015); Parliamentary Vice-Minister for Land, Infrastructure, Transport and Tourism (2014-2015)	
Shun'ichi Suzuki	April 13, 1953 (age 73)	Iwate 2nd	Secretary-General of the Liberal Democratic Party (2025–present) Previous offices held: Chairperson of the LDP General Council (2019-2020; 2024-2025); Minister of Finance (2021-2024); Minister for the Tokyo Olympic and Paralympic Games (2017-2018; 2019); State Minister for Foreign Affairs (2012-2013); Minister of the Environment (2002-2003)	
Yasufumi Tanahashi	February 11, 1963 (age 63)	Gifu 2nd	None Previous offices held: Chair of the National Public Safety Commission (2021); Minister of State for Special Missions (2004-2005)	
Kazunori Tanaka	January 21, 1949 (age 77)	Kanagawa 10th	None Previous offices held: Minister for Reconstruction (2019–2020); State Minister of Environment (2012–2013); State Minister of Finance (2006-2007); Parliamentary Vice-Minister for Foreign Affairs (2003-2004); Parliamentary Secretary for Finance (2002-2003); Parliamentary Vice-Minister for Land, Infrastructure, Transport and Tourism (2001-2002)	
Shin Tsuchida	October 30, 1990 (age 35)	Tokyo 13th	None Previous offices held: Parliamentary Secretary for Finance (2024–2025); Parliamentary Vice-Minister of Cabinet Office (2023-2024); Parliamentary Vice-Minister of Digital Agency (2023-2024)	
Hideki Tsuji	May 2, 1975 (age 51)	Tōkai PR （Aichi 2nd）	None	
Kenji Yamada	April 20, 1966 (age 60)	Hyōgo 7th	State Minister of Economy, Trade and Industry (2025-present); State Minister of Cabinet Office (2025-present) Previous offices held: State Minister for Foreign Affairs (2022-2023); Parliamentary Vice-Minister for Foreign Affairs (2018-2019)	
Motoyasu Yamada	November 3, 1982 (age 43)	Hyōgo 11th	None	
Daishiro Yamagiwa	September 12, 1968 (age 57)	Kanagawa 18th	None Previous offices held: Minister of State for Economic and Fiscal Policy (2021-2022); State Minister of Economy, Trade and Industry (2014-2015); Parliamentary Vice-Minister of Cabinet Office (2012-2013)	
Shunichi Yamaguchi	February 28, 1950 (age 76)	Tokushima 2nd	None Previous offices held: Minister of State for Special Missions (2014–2015); State Minister of Finance (2012–2013); Special Advisor to the Prime Minister of Japan (2008–2009); State Minister for Internal Affairs and Communications (2003-2004)	
Tsuyoshi Yamaguchi	October 3, 1954 (age 71)	Hyōgo 12th	None Previous offices held: Minister of the Environment (2021–2022); State Minister for Foreign Affairs (2011-2012); State Minister of Cabinet Office (2011)	
Sakon Yamamoto	July 9, 1982 (age 43)	Tōkai PR	None	
Shizuo Yamashita	July 6, 1975 (age 50)	Aichi 16th	None	
Hiromasa Yonai	May 14, 1987 (age 39)	Tohoku PR （Iwate 1st）	None	

=== House of Councillors ===
11 members
Name	Birth date and Age	Constituency	Current positions or former positions	Notes
Haruko Arimura	September 21, 1970 (age 55)	National PR	Chair of the LDP General Council (2025-present) Previous offices held: Chair of the LDP Joint Plenary Meeting of Party Members of Both Houses of the Diet (2024-2025); Chair of the LDP Public Relations Headquarters (2021); Chair of the LDP House of Councillors Policy Council (2019); Minister of State for Special Missions (2014-2015); Parliamentary Vice-Minister for Education, Culture, Sports, Science and Technology (2005-2006)	
Keiichiro Asao	February 11, 1964 (age 62)	Kanagawa	None Previous offices held: Minister of the Environment (2024-2025)	
Masahito Fujikawa	July 8, 1960 (age 65)	Aichi	None Previous offices held: State Minister of Finance (2019-2020); Parliamentary Vice-Minister for Internal Affairs and Communications (2013-2014)	
Toshimitsu Funahashi	November 20, 1960 (age 65)	Hokkaido	None Previous offices held: Parliamentary Vice-Minister for Internal Affairs and Communications (2023-2024); Parliamentary Secretary for Finance (2020-2021)	
Eriko Imai	September 22, 1983 (age 42)	National PR	None Previous offices held: Parliamentary Vice-Minister of Cabinet Office (2019-2020; 2024-2025); Parliamentary Vice-Minister for Reconstruction (2024-2025)	
Kuniko Inoguchi	May 3, 1952 (age 74)	Chiba	None Previous offices held: Minister of State for Policies Related to Measures for Declining Birthrate, and Gender Equality (2005-2006)	
Masayuki Kamiya	January 6, 1979 (age 47)	National PR	Parliamentary Secretary for Health, Labour and Welfare (2025-present)	
Yūsuke Nakanishi	July 12, 1979 (age 46)	Tokushima-Kōchi	None Previous offices held: State Minister for Internal Affairs and Communications (2021-2022); Parliamentary Secretary for Finance (2015-2016)	
Satoshi Ōie	July 17, 1967 (age 58)	Fukuoka	None Previous offices held: State Minister of Finance (2021-2022); Parliamentary Secretary for Finance (2014-2015)	
Katsunori Takahashi	December 7, 1957 (age 68)	Tochigi	State Minister for Internal Affairs and Communications (2025-present) Previous offices held: State Minister of Cabinet Office (2024-2025); State Minister for Reconstruction (2024-2025); State Minister of Land, Infrastructure, Transport and Tourism (2024-2025); Parliamentary Vice-Minister for Land, Infrastructure, Transport and Tourism (2017-2018)	
Hiroshi Yamada	January 8, 1958 (age 68)	National PR	None Previous offices held: Parliamentary Vice-Minister of Cabinet Office (2018-2019); Parliamentary Secretary for Defense (2018-2019)	
