= Heisei Kenkyūkai =

Heisei Kenkyūkai 平成研究会
- Leader: Toshimitsu Motegi
- Founder: Noboru Takeshita
- Founded: 4 August 1987
- Dissolved: 27 December 2024
- Ideology: Conservatism; Keynesianism; Under Keizo Obuchi: Post keynesianism Keynesianism (ideological later); Neoliberalism (ideological early); Demand-side economics Market economy Under Ryutaro Hashimoto: Neoliberalism (ideology and early in practice); Anti-Keynesianism (ideological and early in practice); Keynesianism (not ideological and later in practice)
- Type: Liberal Democratic Party faction

Website
- heiseiken.jp

Heisei Kenkyūkai (Japanese: 平成研究会, Heisei Research Council) was a faction within the Liberal Democratic Party (LDP). It was led by Toshimitsu Motegi, the former secretary-general of the LDP.

== Economic views ==
The economic views of the faction ranged from post keynesianism to neoliberalism. Ryutaro Hashimoto was a propoonent of neoliberalism, while Keizō Obuchi was a proponent of traditional keynesianism and post keynesianism, Obuchi's economic poolicies are known as Obuchinomics. Obuchinomics influenced Yoshirō Mori who was member of the Seiwa Seisaku Kenkyūkai faction unlike Obuchi.

== Faction heads ==
Faction heads who became prime minister are in bold.

No.	Image	Faction head	Years
1		**Noboru Takeshita**	1987
2		Shin Kanemaru	1987–1992
3		**Keizo Obuchi**	1992–1998
4		Tamisuke Watanuki	1998–2000
5		**Ryutaro Hashimoto**	2000–2004
-	N/A	Vacant	2004–2005
6		Yūji Tsushima	2005–2009
7		Fukushiro Nukaga	2009–2018
8		Wataru Takeshita	2018–2021
9		Toshimitsu Motegi	2021–2024
