= Shisuikai =

Shisuikai 志帥会
- Leader: Toshihiro Nikai
- Founder: Masakuni Murakami; Shizuka Kamei
- Founded: 18 March 1999
- Dissolved: 19 January 2024
- Ideology: Conservatism
- Type: Liberal Democratic Party faction

Shisuikai (Japanese: 志帥会) was a faction within the Liberal Democratic Party (LDP). It is led by former LDP secretary-general Toshihiro Nikai. It was considered to be a mid-sized faction. Nikai was considered to be one of the most pro-China lawmakers in Japan, and was also close to LDP's ally, the Komeito. On 19 January 2024, Nikai announced his intention to dissolve the faction, amidst a slush fund scandal within the LDP.

== Heads of the Shisuikai ==
No.	Image	Faction head	Years
1		Masakuni Murakami	1999
2		Takami Eto	1999–2003
3		Shizuka Kamei	2003–2005
4		Bunmei Ibuki	2005–2012
5		Toshihiro Nikai	2012–2024
