= Seiwa Seisaku Kenkyūkai =

Japanese political party faction

Seiwa Seisaku Kenkyūkai 清和政策研究会
- Leader: Collective leadership
- Founder: Takeo Fukuda
- Founded: 24 January 1979
- Dissolved: 19 January 2024
- Ideology: Japanese nationalism National conservatism Keynesianism; Neoliberalism; Abenomics; Under Junichiro Koizumi: Neoliberalism; Anti-Keynesianism; Under Yoshirō Mori: Keynesianism; Pro-regulations (in practice); Deregulation; Obuchinomics; 1979–1986: Anti-economic liberalism Open market
- Political position: Centre-right to far-right
- Type: Liberal Democratic Party faction

Website
- seiwaken.jp at the Wayback Machine (archived 19 January 2024)

Seiwa Seisaku Kenkyūkai (Japanese: 清和政策研究会, lit. Seiwa Political Research Council), often shortened to Seiwa Kai, was a major faction within Japan's Liberal Democratic Party (LDP). It was led by Shinzo Abe from 2021 until his assassination in 2022, and hence has been nicknamed the Abe faction. Since Abe's death, it had collective leadership. The faction announced its dissolution in January 2024.

Seiwakai was the largest faction within the LDP from 2005 until its dissolution. Among the LDP's factions, Seiwa Seisaku Kenkyūkai was the most hardline conservative.

== History ==
The faction was established in 1979 by former prime minister Takeo Fukuda. The faction has its origins on a group formed by Fukuda to oppose prime minister Hayato Ikeda's economic policies.

The faction was led by Shinzo Abe from 2021 until his assassination in 2022. Since Abe's death, it has had collective leadership. On 17 August 2023, the faction has agreed to introduce a collective leadership system, with Ryū Shionoya as its coordinator, while leaving the previous chairmanship post vacant.

In December 2023, news about a slush fund scandal involving several Seiwakai ministers and party bosses, including Yasutoshi Nishimura and Kōichi Hagiuda, leaked. According to initial public allegations, dozens of members of the Diet from the Seiwakai were suspected of collecting at least ¥100 million from fundraising and storing the money in slush funds, in violating of Japanese campaign finance and election law. Prime Minister Fumio Kishida responded by removing all Seiwakai ministers from the cabinet. The National Police Agency raided the Seiwakai headquarters later in the month. Amidst the growing scandal, and following Kishida's announcement that he will dissolve his Kōchikai faction, the Seiwakai announced on 19 January 2024 that it will dissolve itself.

== Political stance ==
Seiwakai is referred to as a nationalist or national-conservative. It has been characterized as right-leaning, hawkish and favoring constitutional revision.

== Seiwa Kai faction heads ==
Faction heads who served as prime minister are in bold.

No.	Image	Faction head	Years
1		**Takeo Fukuda**	1979–1986
2		Shintaro Abe	1986–1991
3		Hiroshi Mitsuzuka	1991–1998
4		**Yoshiro Mori**	1998–2000
5		**Junichiro Koizumi**	2000–2001
6		**Yoshiro Mori**	2001–2006
7		Nobutaka Machimura	2006–2007
-	N/A	Caretaker System: Nobutaka Machimura; Hidenao Nakagawa; Shuzen Tanigawa	2007–2009
8		Nobutaka Machimura	2009–2014
9		Hiroyuki Hosoda	2014–2021
10		**Shinzo Abe**	2021–2022 (assassinated)
-		Representative: Ryū Shionoya	2022–2024

== See also ==
- Nippon Kaigi
