= 2021 Liberal Democratic Party presidential election =

Political party leadership elections in Japan

- 29 September 2021
- Registered: 1,104,336
- Turnout: 762,004 · 69.00%
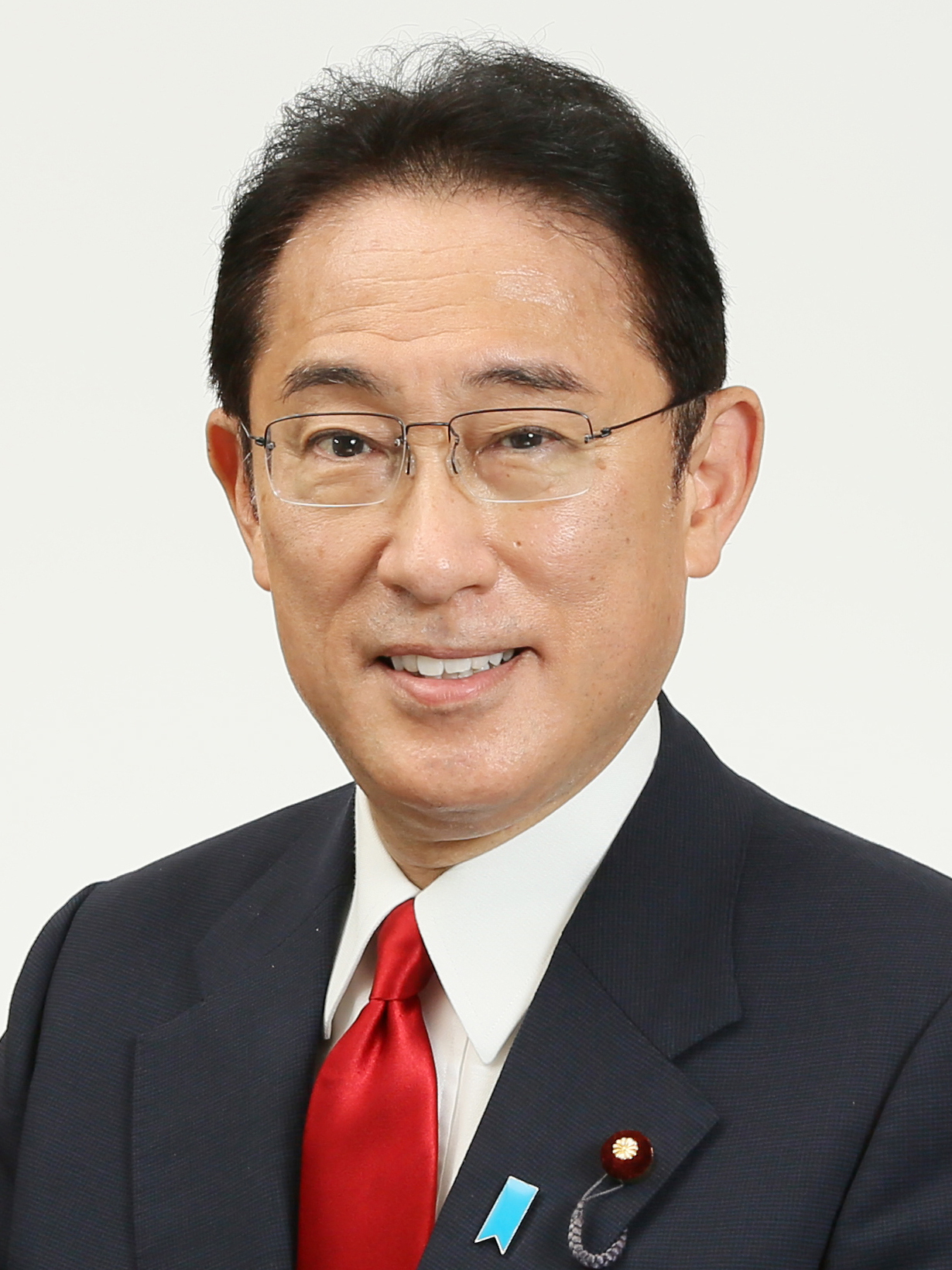

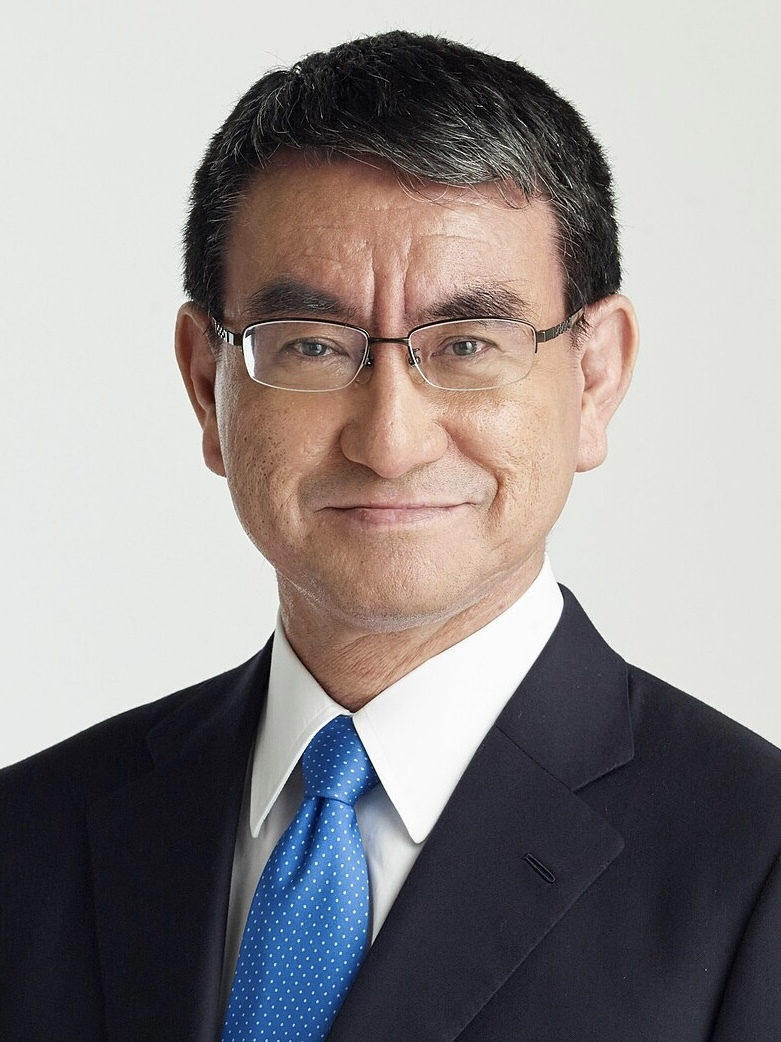

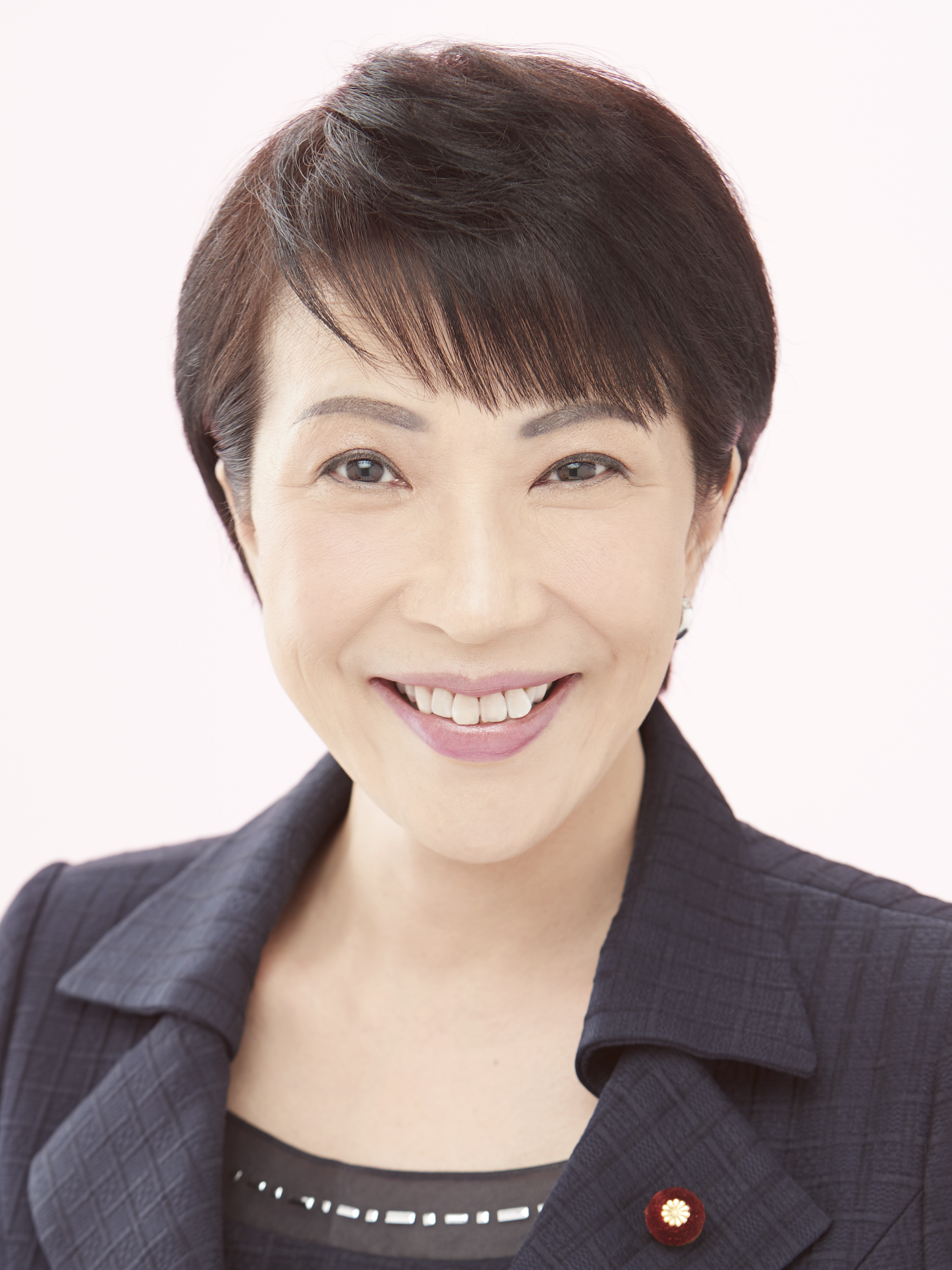

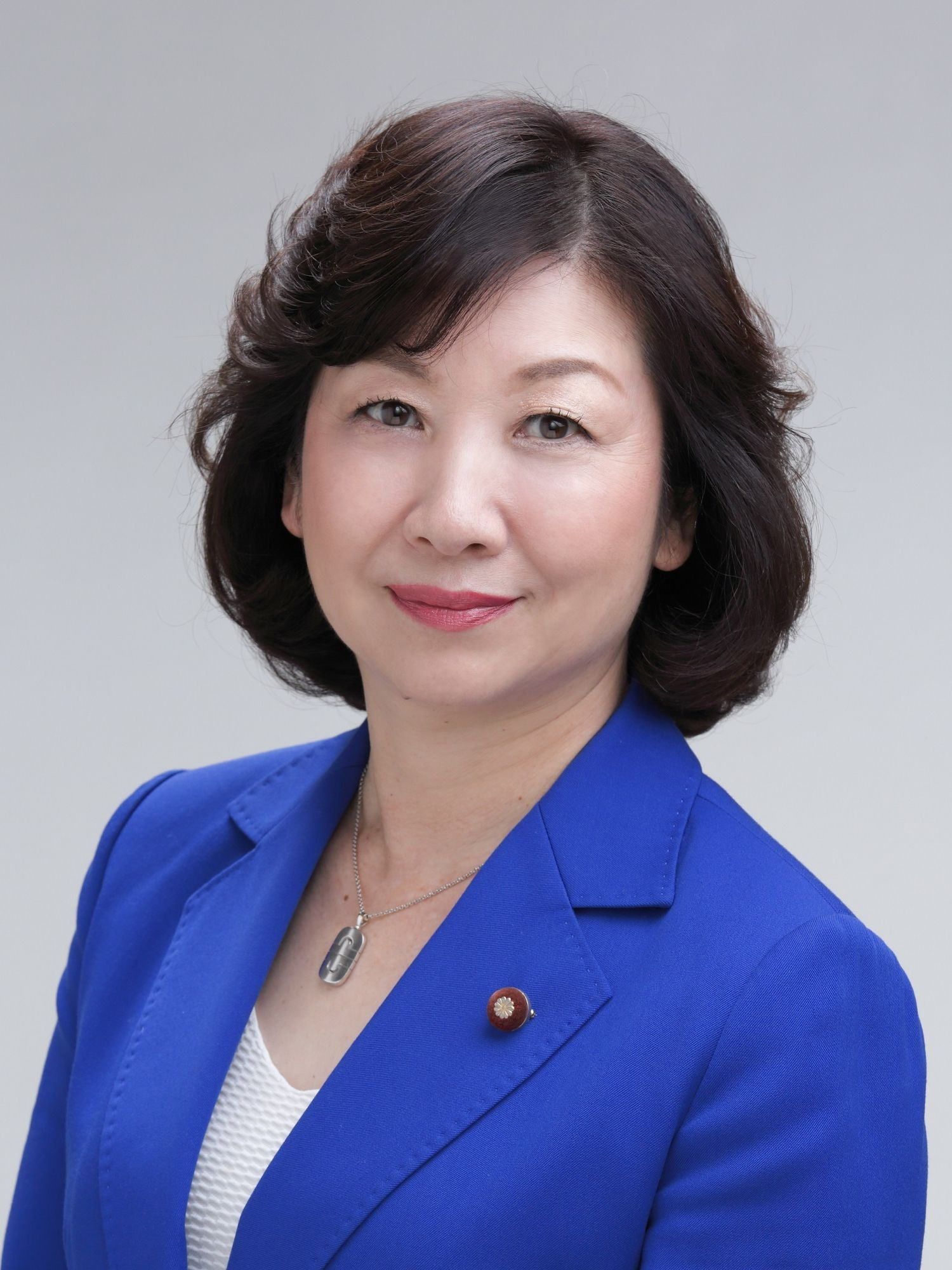
Candidate	Fumio Kishida	Taro Kono
Leader's seat	Hiroshima 1st	Kanagawa 15th
First round	256 (33.60%)	255 (33.46%)
Runoff vote	257 (60.19%)	170 (39.81%)
Candidate	Sanae Takaichi	Seiko Noda
Leader's seat	Nara 2nd	Gifu 1st
First round	188 (24.67%)	63 (8.27%)
Runoff vote	Eliminated	Eliminated
President before election
Yoshihide Suga
Elected President
Fumio Kishida

The 2021 Liberal Democratic Party presidential election was held on 29 September 2021 to elect the next President of the Liberal Democratic Party of Japan and Prime Minister of Japan. Fumio Kishida was elected to lead the party and assumed the premiership on 4 October. He led the party into the 2021 Japanese general election.

President of the LDP and Prime Minister Yoshihide Suga announced on 3 September that he would not run for his re-election, amid low approval ratings and media reports of dissension within the party. Suga was initially elected President of the LDP in 2020 to serve the rest of former prime minister Shinzo Abe's third and final term after Abe resigned in August 2020 due to health issues.

Former Minister for Foreign Affairs Fumio Kishida won the election in a second round runoff, defeating opponent Taro Kono, the incumbent Minister for Administrative Reform and Regulatory Reform. Kishida's victory was driven by strong support among LDP Diet members, while Kono led polling prior to the election and won the most votes from dues-paying party members. Kishida was confirmed by the Diet as Japan's 100th Prime Minister on 4 October 2021.

== Background ==
Shinzo Abe was elected President of the LDP three consecutive times in 2012, 2015 and 2018 following a rule change in 2017 which extended the office's term limit to three consecutive terms instead of two. He successfully led the LDP to three consecutive general election victories in 2012, 2014 and 2017 and assumed the premiership as the longest-serving Prime Minister in Japanese history. On 28 August 2020, Abe suddenly announced that he would resign as Prime Minister and LDP president following a resurgence of his ulcerative colitis.

Chief Cabinet Secretary Yoshihide Suga won the party's special election in September 2020 to serve the remainder of Abe's term as LDP president, with Suga subsequently entering office as prime minister on 16 September. Suga had initially announced that he would run for re-election for a full term as LDP president in advance of the 2021 general election. On 3 September 2021, Suga reversed course and announced that he would not run for re-election as LDP president, amid poor approval ratings and media reports of internal dissension within the party regarding Suga's leadership.

Suga's withdrawal from the race as well as the fact that most of the LDP's internal factions have declined to endorse a specific candidate led to the election being described as wide open and unpredictable.

== Election procedure ==
The election process for the President of the LDP is established in the "Rules for the Election of President of the Party". To officially qualify as a candidate in the election, a candidate must be an LDP member of the National Diet and must receive a nomination from at least 20 fellow LDP Diet members.

The LDP selects its leader via a two-round election involving both LDP members of the Diet and dues-paying party members from across Japan. In the first round, all LDP members of the Diet cast one vote while party member votes are translated proportionally into votes equaling the other half of the total ballots. If any candidate wins a majority (over 50%) of votes in the first-round, that candidate is elected president.

If no candidate receives a majority of votes in the first round, a runoff is held immediately between the top two candidates. In the runoff, all Diet members vote again while the 47 prefectural chapters of the LDP get one vote each, with the result of the latter votes determined using the first round results of party members in each prefecture. The candidate who wins the most votes in the runoff is then elected president.

The party's secretary general can decide to organise the election with the rule of the second round only, as was decided in 2020, but didn't as for 2021.

== Candidates ==
=== Declared ===
Candidate(s)	Date of birth	Current position	Party faction	Electoral district	Announced	Reference(s)
Fumio Kishida	29 July 1957 (age 64)	Member of the House of Representatives (since 1993) Previous offices held: Minister of Foreign Affairs (2012–2017); Acting Minister of Defense (2017); Chairman of the Liberal Democratic Party Policy Research Council (2017–2020); 2020 Liberal Democratic leadership candidate	Kōchikai (Kishida)	Hiroshima 1st	26 August 2021	
Taro Kono	10 January 1963 (age 59)	Minister for Administrative Reform and Regulatory Reform (since 2020); Minister for COVID-19 Vaccinations (since 2021); Member of the House of Representatives (since 1996) Previous offices held: Minister of Defense (2019–2020); Minister for Foreign Affairs (2017–2019); Chair of the National Public Safety Commission (2015–2016)	Shikōkai (Asō)	Kanagawa 15th	10 September 2021	
Sanae Takaichi	7 March 1961 (age 60)	Member of the House of Representatives (since 2005) Previous offices held: Minister for Internal Affairs and Communications (2014–2017; 2019–2020); Chairman of the Liberal Democratic Party Policy Research Council (2012–2014)	None (Widely regarded as an ally of Shinzo Abe)	Nara 2nd	8 September 2021	
Seiko Noda	3 September 1960 (age 61)	Member of the House of Representatives (since 1993) Previous offices held: Minister of Internal Affairs and Communications (2017–2018); 2018 Liberal Democratic leadership candidate	None	Gifu 1st	16 September 2021	

=== Withdrawn ===
Candidate(s)	Date of birth	Notable positions	Party faction(s)	District(s)	Announced	Withdrew	Reference(s)
Yoshihide Suga	6 December 1948 (age 73)	Prime Minister (since 2020); Member of the House of Representatives (since 1996) Other offices: Chief Cabinet Secretary (2012–2020); Minister for Internal Affairs and Communications (2006–2007)	Ganesha no Kai (Suga)	Kanagawa 2nd	17 July 2021	3 September 2021 (endorsed Kono)	

=== Declined ===
- Shinzo Abe, Prime Minister (2006–2007, 2012–2020), Member of the House of Representatives, (1996–present) Chief Cabinet Secretary (2005–2006) (endorsed Takaichi)
- Taro Aso, Prime Minister (2008–2009), Deputy Prime Minister (2012–2021), Member of the House of Representatives, (1979–1983, 1986–present), Minister for Foreign Affairs (2005–2007), Minister for Internal Affairs and Communications, (2003–2005)
- Shigeru Ishiba, Member of the House of Representatives (1986–present), Minister for Overcoming Population Decline and Vitalizing Local Economy (2014–2016), Minister of Agriculture, Forestry and Fisheries (2008–2009), Minister of Defense (2007–2008) (endorsed Kono)
- Shinjirō Koizumi, Member of the House of Representatives for Kanagawa 11th district (2009–present), Minister of the Environment (2019–2021), son of former Prime Minister Junichiro Koizumi. (endorsed Kono)
- Toshimitsu Motegi, Minister for Foreign Affairs (2019–2021), Member of the House of Representatives (1993–present), former Minister of Economy, Trade and Industry (2012–2014) and Secretary General of the LDP (since 2021)
- Hakubun Shimomura, Member of the House of Representatives (1996–present), Minister of Education, Culture, Sports, Science and Technology (2012–2015)

== Supporters ==
=== Recommenders ===
Party regulations require candidates to have the written support at least 20 Diet members, known as recommenders, to run.

Fumio Kishida

Leader of recommenders

- Shun'ichi Suzuki (Member of the House of Representatives for Iwate 2nd district) (Shikōkai)

Campaign Manager

- Takumi Nemoto (Member of the House of Representatives for Fukushima 2nd district) (Kōchikai)

Recommenders

- Masatoshi Ishida (Member of the House of Representatives for Wakayama 2nd district) (no faction)
- Keitaro Ohno (Member of the House of Representatives for Kagawa 3rd district) (no faction)
- Ayuko Kato (Member of the House of Representatives for Yamagata 3rd district) (no faction)
- Hiroshi Kajiyama (Member of the House of Representatives for Ibaraki 4th district) (no faction)
- Hayato Suzuki (Member of the House of Representatives for Tokyo 10th district) (Heiseiken)
- Tsuyoshi Takagi (Member of the House of Representatives for Fukui 2nd district) (Seiwakai)
- Shinako Tsuchiya (Member of the House of Representatives for Saitama 13th district) (no faction)
- Kozaburo Nishime (Member of the House of Representatives for Okinawa 4th district) (Heiseiken)
- Noriko Horiuchi (Member of the House of Representatives for Yamanashi 2nd district) (Kōchikai)
- Taro Honda (Member of the House of Representatives for Kyoto 5th district) (no faction)
- Daishiro Yamagiwa (Member of the House of Representatives for Kanagawa 18th district) (Shikōkai)
- Masayoshi Yoshino (Member of the House of Representatives for Fukushima 5th district) (Seiwakai)
- Hiromichi Watanabe (Member of the House of Representatives for Chiba 6th district) (Heiseiken)
- Kuniko Inoguchi (Member of the House of Councillors from Chiba) (Shikōkai)
- Eriko Imai (Member of the House of Councillors from National PR block) (Shikōkai)
- Satoshi Ninoyu (Member of the House of Councillors from Kyoto) (Heiseiken)
- Shuji Miyamoto (Member of the House of Councillors from National PR block) (Seiwakai)
- Masako Mori (Member of the House of Councillors from Fukushima) (Seiwakai)
Taro Kono

Leader of recommenders

- Tatsuya Ito (Member of the House of Representatives for Tokyo 22nd district) (no faction)

Campaign Manager

- Tetsushi Sakamoto (Member of the House of Representatives for Kumamoto 3rd district) (Kinmirai Seiji Kenkyūkai)

Recommenders

- Toshiko Abe (Member of the House of Representatives for Okayama 3rd district) (Shikōkai)
- Yoichi Anami (Member of the House of Representatives for Ōita 1st district) (Seiwakai)
- Tadahiko Ito (Member of the House of Representatives for Aichi 8th district) (Shisuikai)
- Hirotaka Ishihara (Member of the House of Representatives for Tokyo 3rd district) (Kinmirai Seiji Kenkyūkai)
- Kenichiro Ueno (Member of the House of Representatives for Shiga 2nd district) (Kinmirai Seiji Kenkyūkai)
- Shohei Okashita (Member of the House of Representatives for Kinki PR block) (Shisuikai)
- Ryosei Tanaka (Member of the House of Representatives for Saitama 15th district) (no faction)
- Masaaki Taira (Member of the House of Representatives for Tokyo 4th district) (Suigetsukai)
- Hinako Takahashi (Member of the House of Representatives for Tohoku PR block) (Shikōkai)
- Nobuhide Takemura (Member of the House of Representatives for Shiga 3rd district) (no faction)
- Atsushi Nonaka (Member of the House of Representatives for Saitama 12th district) (Heiseiken)
- Yoshihisa Furukawa (Member of the House of Representatives for Miyazaki 3rd district) (Suigetsukai)
- Masahisa Miyazaki (Member of the House of Representatives for Kyushu PR block) (Heiseiken)
- Hiroyuki Yoshiie (Member of the House of Representatives for Kanagawa 16th district) (Seiwakai)
- Dai Shimamura (Member of the House of Councillors from Kanagawa) (no faction)
- Shuko Sonoda (Member of the House of Councillors from National PR block) (no faction)
- Kenji Nakanishi (Member of the House of Councillors from Kanagawa) (Shikōkai)
- Yuhei Yamashita (Member of the House of Councillors from Saga) (Heiseiken)
Sanae Takaichi

Leader of recommenders

- Yasutoshi Nishimura (Member of the House of Representatives for Hyōgo 9th district) (Seiwakai)

Campaign Manager

- Keiji Furuya (Member of the House of Representatives for Gifu 5th district) (no faction)

Recommenders

- Hiroshi Hase (Member of the House of Representatives for Ishikawa 1st district) (Seiwakai)
- Tsuyoshi Yamaguchi (Member of the House of Representatives for Hyōgo 12th district) (Shisuikai)
- Taku Etō (Member of the House of Representatives for Miyazaki 2nd district) (no faction)
- Minoru Kiuchi (Member of the House of Representatives for Shizuoka 7th district) (no faction)
- Shuichi Takatori (Member of the House of Representatives for Niigata 6th district) (Seiwakai)
- Minoru Kihara (Member of the House of Representatives for Kumamoto 1st district) (Heiseiken)
- Hitoshi Kikawada (Member of the House of Representatives for Saitama 3rd district) (no faction)
- Akimasa Ishikawa (Member of the House of Representatives for Ibaraki 5th district) (no faction)
- Takayuki Kobayashi (Member of the House of Representatives for Chiba 2nd district) (Shisuikai)
- Hajime Sasaki (Member of the House of Representatives for Ishikawa 2nd district) (Seiwakai)
- Shigeki Kobayashi (Member of the House of Representatives for Nara 1st district) (Shisuikai)
- Seiichi Eto (Member of the House of Councillors from National PR block) (Shisuikai)
- Eriko Yamatani (Member of the House of Councillors from National PR block) (Seiwakai)
- Satsuki Katayama (Member of the House of Councillors from National PR block) (Shisuikai)
- Shigeharu Aoyama (Member of the House of Councillors from National PR block) (no faction)
- Hiroshi Yamada (Member of the House of Councillors from National PR block) (Seiwakai)
- Kei Satō (Member of the House of Councillors from Nara) (Seiwakai)
- Kimi Onoda (Member of the House of Councillors from Okayama) (Heiseiken)
Seiko Noda

Leader of recommenders

- Junko Mihara (Member of the House of Councillors from Kanagawa) (no faction)

Campaign Manager

- Takeyuki Watanabe (Member of the House of Councillors from Gifu) (Heiseiken)

Recommenders

- Toshitaka Ōoka (Member of the House of Representatives for Shiga 1st district) (Shisuikai)
- Noboru Kamiya (Member of the House of Representatives for Kinki PR block) (Shisuikai)
- Jiro Kawasaki (Member of the House of Representatives for Tōkai PR block) (no faction)
- Yayoi Kimura (Member of the House of Representatives for Kinki PR block) (no faction)
- Minoru Debata (Member of the House of Representatives for Southern Kanto PR block) (Shisuikai)
- Kisaburo Tokai (Member of the House of Representatives for Hyōgo 10th district) (no faction)
- Yasukazu Hamada (Member of the House of Representatives for Chiba 12th district) (no faction)
- Kimichika Hyakutake (Member of the House of Representatives for Northern Kanto PR block) (Heiseiken)
- Teru Fukui (Member of the House of Representatives for Shikoku PR block) (Shisuikai)
- Takuma Miyaji (Member of the House of Representatives for Kyushu PR block) (Kinmirai Seiji Kenkyūkai)
- Tsuyohito Iwamoto (Member of the House of Councillors from Hokkaido) (Shisuikai)
- Masato Shimizu (Member of the House of Councillors from Gunma) (Shisuikai)
- Yoshifumi Tsuge (Member of the House of Councillors from National PR block) (no faction)
- Yosuke Tsuruho (Member of the House of Councillors from Wakayama) (Shisuikai)
- Masayuki Tokushige (Member of the House of Councillors from National PR block) (no faction)
- Toru Miki (Member of the House of Councillors from National PR block) (Shisuikai)
- Taichirō Motoe (Member of the House of Councillors from Chiba) (Heiseiken)
- Toshio Yamada (Member of the House of Councillors from National PR block) (no faction)

Number of recommenders by factions

Candidates	Fumio Kishida	Taro Kono	Sanae Takaichi	Seiko Noda
Heisei Kenkyūkai	4	3	2	3
Kinmirai Seiji Kenkyūkai	0	3	0	1
Kōchikai	2	0	0	0
Seiwa Seisaku Kenkyūkai	4	2	7	0
Shikōkai	4	3	0	0
Shisuikai	0	2	5	8
Suigetsukai	0	2	0	0
No faction	6	5	6	8

=== Endorsements ===
Endorsements of Fumio Kishida

Current cabinet-level officials

- Hiroshi Kajiyama (Minister of Economy, Trade and Industry; Member of the House of Representatives for Ibaraki 4th district) (no faction)
- Toshimitsu Motegi (Minister for Foreign Affairs; Member of the House of Representatives for Tochigi 5th district) (Heiseiken)
- Yōko Kamikawa (Minister of Justice; Member of the House of Representatives for Shizuoka 1st district) (Kōchikai)
- Takuya Hirai (Minister for Digital Transformation; Member of the House of Representatives for Kagawa 1st district) (Kōchikai)

Former cabinet-level officials

- Masako Mori (Former Minister of Justice, 2019–2020; former Minister of State for Consumer Affairs and Food Safety, 2012–2014; Member of the House of Councillors from Fukushima) (Seiwakai)
- Seigo Kitamura (Former Minister of State for Special Missions (Regional Revitalization and Regulatory Reform), 2019–2020; Member of the House of Representatives for Nagasaki 4th district) (Kōchikai)
- Naokazu Takemoto (Former Minister of State for Information Technology, 2019–2020; Member of the House of Representatives for Osaka 15th district) (Kōchikai)
- Hiroyuki Hosoda (Former Chief Cabinet Secretary, 2004–2005; Chairman of the Seiwa Seisaku Kenkyūkai; Member of the House of Representatives for Shimane 1st district) (Seiwakai)
- Yasuhisa Shiozaki (Former Minister of Health, Labour and Welfare, 2014–2017; former Chief Cabinet Secretary, 2006–2007; Member of the House of Representatives for Ehime 1st district) (no faction)
- Fukushiro Nukaga (Former Minister of Finance, 2007–2008; former Director-General of the Japan Defense Agency, 2005–2006, 1998 Member of the House of Representatives for Ibaraki 2nd district) (Heiseiken)
- Masatoshi Ishida (Former Minister for Internal Affairs and Communications, 2018–2019; Member of the House of Representatives for Wakayama 2nd district) (Kōchikai)
- Seishiro Eto (Former Director-General of the Japan Defense Agency, 1995–1996; Member of the House of Representatives for Ōita 2nd district) (no faction)
- Itsunori Onodera (Former Minister of Defense, 2017–2018, 2012–2014; Member of the House of Representatives for Miyagi 6th district) (Kōchikai)
- Akinori Eto (Former Minister of Defense, 2014; Member of the House of Representatives for Tohoku PR block) (Shikōkai)
- Gen Nakatani (Former Minister of Defense, 2014–2016; Member of the House of Representatives for Kōchi 1st district) (Yūrinkai)
- Eisuke Mori (Former Minister of Justice; Member of the House of Representatives for Chiba 11th district) (Shikōkai)
- Ryū Shionoya (Former Minister of Education, Culture, Sports, Science and Technology, 2008–2009; Member of the House of Representatives for Shizuoka 8th district) (Seiwakai)
- Yūji Yamamoto (Former Minister of Agriculture, Forestry and Fisheries, 2016–2017; Minister of State for Financial Services, 2006–2007; Member of the House of Representatives for Shikoku PR block) (Suigetsukai)
- Yūko Obuchi (Former Minister of Economy, Trade and Industry, 2014; Member of the House of Representatives for Gunma 5th district) (Heiseiken)
- Yoichi Miyazawa (Former Minister of Economy, Trade and Industry, 2014–2015; former Member of the House of Representatives for Hiroshima 7th district, 2000–2009; Member of the House of Councillors for Hiroshima) (Kōchikai)
- Hajime Funada (Former Director-General of the Economic Planning Agency, 1992–1993; Member of the House of Representatives for Tochigi 1st district) (Heiseiken)
- Akira Amari (Former Minister of State for Economic and Fiscal Policy, 2012–2016; former Minister of Economy, Trade and Industry, 2006–2008; former Minister of Labour, 1998–1999; Member of the House of Representatives for Kanagawa 13th district) (Shikōkai)
- Nobuteru Ishihara (Former Minister of State for Economic and Fiscal Policy, 2016–2017; former Minister of the Environment, 2012–2014; former Minister of Land, Infrastructure, Transport and Tourism, 2003–2004; former Minister of State for Regulatory Reform, 2001–2003; Member of the House of Representatives for Tokyo 8th district) (Kinmirai Seiji Kenkyūkai)
- Toshiaki Endo (Former Minister in charge of the Tokyo Olympic and Paralympic Games, 2015–2016; Member of the House of Representatives for Yamagata 1st district)
- Shun'ichi Suzuki (Former Minister in charge of the Tokyo Olympic and Paralympic Games, 2019, 2017–2018; former Minister of the Environment, 2002–2003; Member of the House of Representatives for Iwate 2nd district) (Shikōkai)
- Takumi Nemoto (Former Minister of Health, Labour and Welfare, 2018–2019; former Minister for Reconstruction, 2012–2014; Member of the House of Representatives for Fukushima 2nd district) (Kōchikai)
- Tsuyoshi Takagi (Former Minister for Reconstruction, 2015–2016; Member of the House of Representatives for Fukui 2nd district) (Seiwakai)
- Masayoshi Yoshino (Former Minister for Reconstruction, 2017–2018; Member of the House of Representatives for Fukushima 5th district) (Seiwakai)
- Hiromichi Watanabe (Former Minister for Reconstruction, 2018–2019; Member of the House of Representatives for Chiba 6th district) (Heiseiken)
- Seiichiro Murakami (Former Minister of State for Administrative Reform and for Regulatory Reform, 2004–2005; Member of the House of Representatives for Ehime 2nd district) (no faction)
- Kozo Yamamoto (Former Minister of State for Regional Revitalization and Minister for Administrative Reform and Regulatory Reform, 2016–2017; Member of the House of Representatives for Fukuoka 10th district) (Kōchikai)
- Mitsuhiro Miyakoshi (Former Minister of State for Okinawa and the Northern Territories, for Consumer and Food Safety, for Declining Birth Rate and for Ocean Policy, 2018–2019; Member of the House of Representatives for Toyama 2nd district) (Kōchikai)
- Shunichi Yamaguchi (Former Minister of State for Consumer Affairs and Food Safety, 2014–2015; Member of the House of Representatives for Tokushima 2nd district) (Shikōkai)
- Kuniko Inoguchi (Former Minister of State for Gender Equality and Social Affairs, 2005–2006; former Member of the House of Representatives for Tokyo PR block, 2005–2009; Member of the House of Councillors from Chiba) (Shikōkai)

Prefectural politicians

- Hidehiko Yuzaki (Governor of Hiroshima Prefecture)
- Hiroshima Prefectural LDP Federation
- Ibaraki Prefectural LDP Assembly Group
- Volunteers from the Saitama Prefectural Assembly

Municipal politicians
Party factions

- Kōchikai
- Seiwa Seisaku Kenkyūkai
- Shikōkai
- Heisei Kenkyūkai
- Yūrinkai

Other prominent individuals

- Wataru Takeshita (Former Chairman of the Heisei Kenkyūkai; former Minister for Reconstruction, 2014–2015; former Member of the House of Representatives for Shimane 2nd district) (Heiseiken) (Note: Deceased since 17 September 2021.)
- Sadakazu Tanigaki (Former party president, 2009–2012; former Leader of the Opposition, 2009–2012; former Minister of Justice, 2012–2014; former Member of the House of Representatives for Kyōto 5th district, 1983–2016) (Yūrinkai)
- Yoshimasa Hayashi (Former Minister of Education, Culture, Sports, Science and Technology; former Member of the House of Councillors from Yamaguchi) (Kōchikai) (Note: He resigned from his position as a member of the House of Councillors to run in the House of Representatives election.)
Endorsements of Tarō Kōno

Current cabinet-level officials

- Yoshihide Suga (Prime Minister and outgoing party president; former Chief Cabinet Secretary, 2012–2020; Member of the House of Representatives for Kanagawa 2nd district) (Ganesha no Kai)
- Norihisa Tamura (Minister of Health, Labour, and Welfare; Member of the House of Representatives for Mie 4th district) (Suigetsukai)
- Shinjirō Koizumi (Minister of the Environment; Member of the House of Representatives for Kanagawa 11th district; Son of former Prime Minister Junichiro Koizumi) (no faction)
- Tetsushi Sakamoto (Minister in charge of Measures Against Loneliness and Isolation; Member of the House of Representatives for Kumamoto 3rd district) (Kinmirai Seiji Kenkyūkai)
- Shinji Inoue (Minister in charge of International Exposition; Member of the House of Representatives for Tokyo 25th district) (Shikōkai)
- Yasufumi Tanahashi (Chair of the National Public Safety Commission; Member of the House of Representatives for Gifu 2nd district) (Shikōkai)

Former cabinet-level officials

- Masahiko Shibayama (Former Minister of Education, Culture, Sports, Science and Technology, 2018–2019; Member of the House of Representatives for Saitama 8th district) (Seiwakai)
- Yoshiaki Harada (Former Minister of the Environment, 2018–2019; Member of the House of Representatives for Fukuoka 5th district) (Shikōkai)
- Yoshitaka Sakurada (Former Minister of State for the Tokyo Olympic and Paralympic Games, 2018–2019; Member of the House of Representatives for Chiba 8th district) (Shisuikai) (Note: Although he had expressed support for Kono, he later revealed on his Twitter account that he voted for Takaichi in the first round and Kishida in the runoff election.)
- Shigeru Ishiba (Former Minister of Agriculture, Forestry and Fisheries, 2008–2009; former Minister of Defense, 2007–2008; Member of the House of Representatives for Tottori 1st district) (Suigetsukai)
- Takeshi Iwaya (Former Minister of Defense, 2018–2019; Member of the House of Representatives for Ōita 3rd district) (Shikōkai)
- Hiroshi Moriyama (Former Minister of Agriculture, Forestry and Fisheries, 2015–2016; Member of the House of Representatives for Kagoshima 4th district) (Kinmirai Seiji Kenkyūkai)
- Ken Saitō (Former Minister of Agriculture, Forestry and Fisheries, 2017–2018; Member of the House of Representatives for Chiba 7th district) (Suigetsukai)
- Tatsuya Ito (Former Minister of State for Special Missions (Financial Services), 2004–2005; Member of the House of Representatives for Tokyo 22nd district) (no faction)
- Tsutomu Sato (Former Minister for Internal Affairs and Communications, 2009; Chair of the National Public Safety Commission, 2008–2009; Member of the House of Representatives for Tochigi 4th district) (Shikōkai)
- Takeaki Matsumoto (Former Minister for Foreign Affairs, 2011; Member of the House of Representatives for Hyōgo 11th district) (Shikōkai)
- Takashi Yamashita (Former Minister of Justice, 2018–2019; Member of the House of Representatives for Okayama 2nd district) (Suigetsukai)

Prefectural politicians

- Ichita Yamamoto (Governor of Gunma Prefecture; former Member of the House of Councillors for Gunma at-large district, 1995–2019) (no faction)

Municipal politicians

- Yokosuka City LDP Federation
- Miura City LDP Federation

Party factions

- Shikōkai

Other prominent individuals

- Yōhei Kōno (Former party president, 1993–1995; former Speaker of the House of Representatives, 2003–2009; former member of the House of Representatives for Kanagawa 5th district, 1967–1996, and Kanagawa 17th district, 1996–2009; father of Tarō Kōno)
Endorsements of Sanae Takaichi

Current cabinet-level officials

- Nobuo Kishi (Minister of Defense; former Member of the House of Councillors from Yamaguchi, 2004–2012; Member of the House of Representatives for Yamaguchi 2nd district) (Seiwakai)
- Yasutoshi Nishimura (Minister of State for Economic and Fiscal Policy; former Deputy Chief Cabinet Secretary (Political affairs, House of Representatives), 2017–2019; Member of the House of Representatives for Hyōgo 9th district) (Seiwakai)
- Kōichi Hagiuda (Minister of Education, Culture, Sports, Science and Technology; Member of the House of Representatives for Tokyo 24th district) (Seiwakai)

Former cabinet-level officials

- Shinzō Abe (Former Prime Minister, 2006–2007, 2012–2020; former party president, 2006–2007, 2012–2020; Member of the House of Representatives for Yamaguchi 4th district) (Seiwakai)
- Seiichi Eto (Former Minister of State for Consumer Affairs and Food Safety, for Declining Birth Rates, for Ocean Policy and for Okinawa and Northern Territories Affairs, 2019–2020; former Member of the House of Representatives for Kyushu PR block, 2003–2005, 1996–2000; Member of the House of Councillors from National PR block) (Shisuikai)
- Taku Etō (Former Minister of Agriculture, Forestry and Fisheries, 2019–2020; Member of the House of Representatives for Miyazaki 2nd district) (no faction)
- Takeo Kawamura (Former Chief Cabinet Secretary, 2008–2009; former Minister of Education, Culture, Sports, Science and Technology, 2003–2004; Member of the House of Representatives for Yamaguchi 3rd district) (Shisuikai)
- Hirofumi Nakasone (Former Minister for Foreign Affairs, 2008–2009; Former Minister of Education and Director of the Science and Technology Agency, 1999–2000; Member of the House of Councillors from Gunma) (Shisuikai)
- Tomomi Inada (Former Minister of Defense, 2016–2017; former Minister of Administrative Reform, in charge of Civil Service Reform, in charge of the Cool Japan Strategy, in charge of the Challenge Again Initiative and for Regulatory Reform, 2012–2014; Member of the House of Representatives for Fukui 1st district) (Seiwakai)
- Keiji Furuya (Former Chairman of the National Public Safety Commission, 2012–2014; Member of the House of Representatives for Gifu 5th district) (no faction)
- Hiroshi Hase (Former Minister of Education, Culture, Sports, Science and Technology, 2015–2016; former Member of the House of Councillors from Ishikawa, 1995–2000; Member of the House of Representatives for Ishikawa 1st district) (no faction)
- Satsuki Katayama (Former Minister for Regional Revitalization and for Gender Equality, 2018–2019; former Member of the House of Representatives for Shizuoka 7th district, 2005–2009; Member of the House of Councillors from National PR block) (Shisuikai)
- Eriko Yamatani (Former Chair of the National Public Safety Commission and Minister in charge of Civil Service Reform and of Ocean Policy and Territorial Issues, 2014–2015; former Minister in charge of the Abduction Issue, 2012–2014; former Member of the House of Representatives for Tōkai PR block, 2000–2003; Member of the House of Councillors from National PR block) (Seiwakai)
- Haruko Arimura (Former Minister of State for Government Revitalization, 2014–2015; former Minister of State for Consumer Affairs and Food Safety, 2014; Member of the House of Councillors from National PR block) (Shikōkai)

Prefectural politicians

- Nara 2nd district Youth Bureau
- Local assembly member volunteer from Osaka Prefecture LDP Federation

Municipal politicians

- Mayors of 14 cities and towns within the Nara 2nd district (Note: This excludes the mayor of Yamazoe Village immediately after the mayoral election.)

Party factions

- Seiwa Seisaku Kenkyūkai

Other prominent individuals

Endorsements of Seiko Noda

Former cabinet-level officials

- Yasukazu Hamada (Former Minister of Defense, 2008–2009; Member of the House of Representatives for Chiba 12th district) (no faction)
- Jirō Kawasaki (Former Minister of Health, Labour and Welfare, 2005–2006; former Minister of Transport, 1998–1999; Member of the House of Representatives for Tōkai PR block) (Yūrinkai)
- Kisaburo Tokai (Former Minister of Education, Culture, Sports, Science and Technology, 2007–2008; Member of the House of Representatives for Hyōgo 10th district) (Kinmirai Seiji Kenkyūkai)
- Yōsuke Tsuruho (Former Minister of State for Special Missions (Okinawa and Northern Territories Affairs, Cool Japan Strategy, Intellectual Property Strategy, Science and Technology Policy, Space Policy) and Minister of State for Information and Communications Technology (IT) Policy, 2016–2017; Member of the House of Councillors from Wakayama) (Shisuikai)
- Teru Fukui (Former Minister of State for Special Missions (Okinawa and Northern Territories Affairs, Consumer Affairs and Food Safety, Maritime Policy) and Minister in charge of Territorial Issues, 2018; Member of the House of Representatives for Shikoku PR block) (Shisuikai)

Prefectural politicians

- Gifu Prefectural LDP Assembly Group

Municipal politicians

- Gifu City LDP Federation

Party factions
Other prominent individuals

== Opinion polling ==
Fieldwork date	Polling firm	Sample size	Fumio Kishida	Sanae Takaichi	Taro Kono	Shigeru Ishiba	Seiko Noda	Others	Undecided/None	Notes
25–26 Sep 2021	Kyodo News	1,014	22.4%	16.2%	47.4%	–	3.4%	–	10.7%	(Note: LDP party members)
25 Sep 2021	Mainichi Shimbun	3,748	18%	28%	47%	–	4%	–	3%	–
18 Sep 2021	Mainichi Shimbun	1,043	13%	15%	43%	–	6%	–	23%	–
17–18 Sep 2021	Kyodo News	1,028	18.5%	15.7%	48.6%	–	3.3%	–	13.9%	
16 Sep 2021	Seiko Noda officially announces her candidacy									
14 Sep 2021	Shigeru Ishiba announces that he will not run for the LDP leadership; Shinjirō Koizumi announces that he will not run for the LDP leadership and will back Taro Kono									
11–12 Sep 2021	Asahi Shimbun	1,477	14%	8%	33%	16%	3%	–	26%	–
9–11 Sep 2021	Nikkei Asia	N/A	14%	7%	27%	17%	–	–	35%	–
10 Sep 2021	Taro Kono officially announces his candidacy									
8 Sep 2021	Sanae Takaichi officially announces her candidacy									
4–5 Sep 2021	Kyodo News	1,071	18.8%	4%	31.9%	26.6%	4.4%	–	14.3%	–
4–5 Sep 2021	Yomiuri Shimbun	1,142	12%	–	23%	21%	–	11% (Note: Shinjirō Koizumi: 11%)	33%	–
3 Sep 2021	PM Yoshihide Suga withdraws from the election; Taro Kono conveys privately to LDP members that he will run; and Seiko Noda expresses her willingness to run									
27–29 Aug 2021	Nikkei Asia	1,025	13%	3%	16%	15.5%	–	11% (Note: Yoshihide Suga: 11%)	41.5%	(Note: Preferred Leader of the LDP)
27–29 Aug 2021	Nikkei Asia	1,025	14%	–	18%	12%	–	20% (Note: Yoshihide Suga: 20%)	36%	(Note: Preferred Prime Minister)
26 Aug 2021	Fumio Kishida announces his candidacy; and Sanae Takaichi expresses her willingness to run in the LDP presidential election.									

== Results ==
Full result
Candidate	1st Round								2nd Round					
Candidate	Diet members		Party members				Total points		Diet members		Prefectural chapters		Total points	
Candidate	Votes	%	Popular votes	%	Allocated votes	%	Total votes	%	Votes	%	Votes	%	Total votes	%
Fumio Kishida 当	146	38.42%	219,338	28.86%	110	28.80%	256	33.60%	249	65.53%	8	17.02%	257	60.19%
Taro Kono	86	22.63%	335,046	44.08%	169	44.24%	255	33.46%	131	34.47%	39	82.98%	170	39.81%
Sanae Takaichi	114	30.00%	147,764	19.44%	74	19.37%	188	24.67%	Eliminated					
Seiko Noda	34	8.95%	57,927	7.62%	29	7.59%	63	8.27%	Eliminated					
Total	380	100.00%	760,075	100.00%	382	100.00%	762	100.00%	380	100.00%	47	100.00%	427	100.00%
Valid votes	380	99.73%	760,075	99.75%	382	100.00%	762	99.87%	380	99.73%	47	100.00%	427	99.77%
Invalid and blank votes	1	0.27%	1,929	0.25%	0	0.00%	1	0.13%	1	0.27%	0	0.00%	1	0.23%
Turnout	381	99.73%	762,004	69.00%	382	100.00%	763	99.87%	381	99.74%	47	100.00%	428	99.77%
Registered voters	382	100.00%	1,104,336	100.00%	382	100.00%	764	100.00%	382	100.00%	47	100.00%	429	100.00%

=== Results of Party Members' Votes by Prefectures (First Round) ===
Results of Party Members' Votes by Prefectures
Prefectures	Taro Kono		Fumio Kishida		Sanae Takaichi		Seiko Noda	
Prefectures	Votes	%	Votes	%	Votes	%	Votes	%
Aichi	17,467	52.6%	6,150	18.5%	6,726	20.2%	2,876	8.7%
Akita	4,770	62.0%	1,386	18.0%	982	12.8%	555	7.2%
Aomori	2,943	37.0%	3,435	43.1%	943	11.8%	644	8.1%
Chiba	10,617	48.1%	4,712	21.4%	4,939	22.4%	1,778	8.1%
Ehime	6,109	46.4%	3,469	26.3%	2,674	20.3%	920	7.0%
Fukui	2,742	34.5%	2,716	34.2%	2,050	25.8%	441	5.5%
Fukuoka	8,355	40.0%	7,397	35.4%	3,858	18.5%	1,276	6.1%
Fukushima	4,235	39.8%	4,233	39.7%	1,341	12.6%	845	7.9%
Gifu	8,519	31.2%	5,442	20.0%	3,340	12.2%	9,989	36.6%
Gunma	9,072	50.8%	4,254	23.8%	3,282	18.4%	1,249	7.0%
Hiroshima	1,922	7.7%	20,902	84.2%	1,696	6.8%	320	1.3%
Hokkaido	12,379	48.5%	5,625	22.0%	5,140	20.1%	2,411	9.4%
Hyōgo	8,100	41.6%	3,695	19.0%	6,200	31.8%	1,491	7.6%
Ibaraki	13,204	46.0%	10,428	36.3%	3,339	11.6%	1,741	6.1%
Ishikawa	5,642	35.4%	5,494	34.5%	3,938	24.7%	868	5.4%
Iwate	2,594	45.7%	1,582	27.9%	865	15.3%	632	11.1%
Kagawa	4,707	40.8%	4,736	41.1%	1,443	12.5%	647	5.6%
Kagoshima	7,381	56.5%	2,528	19.4%	1,991	15.2%	1,166	8.9%
Kanagawa	29,092	66.1%	6,185	14.1%	6,829	15.5%	1,892	4.3%
Kōchi	2,677	46.3%	1,767	30.5%	866	15.0%	472	8.2%
Kumamoto	6,012	38.4%	6,109	39.0%	2,783	17.8%	743	4.8%
Kyoto	4,188	39.7%	3,151	29.9%	2,344	22.3%	857	8.1%
Mie	3,876	40.4%	2,919	30.4%	1,908	19.9%	890	9.3%
Miyagi	3,815	38.4%	2,897	29.2%	2,417	24.4%	790	8.0%
Miyazaki	4,732	54.4%	1,980	22.7%	1,687	19.4%	302	3.5%
Nagano	5,921	50.2%	2,485	21.0%	2,228	18.9%	1,169	9.9%
Nagasaki	5,213	39.3%	4,464	33.6%	2,730	20.6%	862	6.5%
Nara	1,190	16.6%	659	9.2%	5,136	71.6%	184	2.6%
Niigata	9,549	53.0%	2,713	15.1%	4,363	24.2%	1,389	7.7%
Ōita	5,351	50.3%	2,430	22.9%	2,174	20.4%	676	6.4%
Okayama	6,260	44.9%	4,106	29.5%	3,029	21.7%	543	3.9%
Okinawa	1,904	41.9%	1,735	38.2%	632	13.9%	275	6.0%
Osaka	9,821	38.2%	6,258	24.4%	7,994	31.1%	1,627	6.3%
Saga	3,063	45.2%	2,221	32.7%	1,059	15.6%	443	6.5%
Saitama	13,879	49.8%	6,993	25.1%	5,151	18.5%	1,841	6.6%
Shiga	4,326	53.3%	1,764	21.7%	1,472	18.2%	551	6.8%
Shimane	3,733	41.1%	3,838	42.2%	1,169	12.9%	348	3.8%
Shizuoka	8,722	40.4%	7,198	33.4%	4,477	20.8%	1,169	5.4%
Tochigi	6,573	47.9%	3,597	26.2%	2,587	18.8%	978	7.1%
Tokushima	3,703	50.8%	2,025	27.8%	988	13.5%	575	7.9%
Tokyo	29,425	44.5%	18,659	28.2%	14,118	21.3%	3,953	6.0%
Tottori	6,360	82.0%	597	7.7%	617	8.0%	179	2.3%
Toyama	9,842	47.3%	5,350	25.7%	4,226	20.3%	1,392	6.7%
Wakayama	4,895	35.5%	3,618	26.3%	2,963	21.5%	2,296	16.7%
Yamagata	3,116	40.8%	3,268	42.8%	669	8.7%	585	7.7%
Yamaguchi	2,947	21.2%	5,565	40.1%	5,032	36.2%	345	2.5%
Yamanashi	4,103	32.0%	6,603	51.5%	1,369	10.7%	752	5.8%
Total	335,046	44.1%	219,338	28.9%	147,764	19.4%	57,927	7.6%

=== Aftermath ===
After Prime Minister Suga announced his resignation, Kono was heavily favored to win the election as he was in first place among many LDP polls leading up to the election. His campaign was endorsed by Suga and other high ranking LDP members, but Kishida narrowly won the first round of the election and ultimately defeated Kono in the run-off.

After being elected, Kishida's victory was labelled as a win for the party's "technocrats establishment". Kishida was seen by many LDP members as a stable choice to succeed Suga rather than a rapid change. Kono was seen as a candidate of change. Kishida vowed not to increase the consumption tax rates in Japan and reviewing the pension and health-care system in the country. He has said that his main focus would be to focus on income redistribution to address income inequality.

U.S. President Joe Biden congratulated Kishida and looked "forward to working with [Kishida] to strengthen our cooperation in the years ahead".

President of Taiwan Tsai Ing-wen congratulated Kishida after he was elected Prime Minister of Japan.
