= Third Abe cabinet =

97th Cabinet of Japan (2014–2017)

- 97th Cabinet of Japan
- 24 December 2014 – 1 November 2017
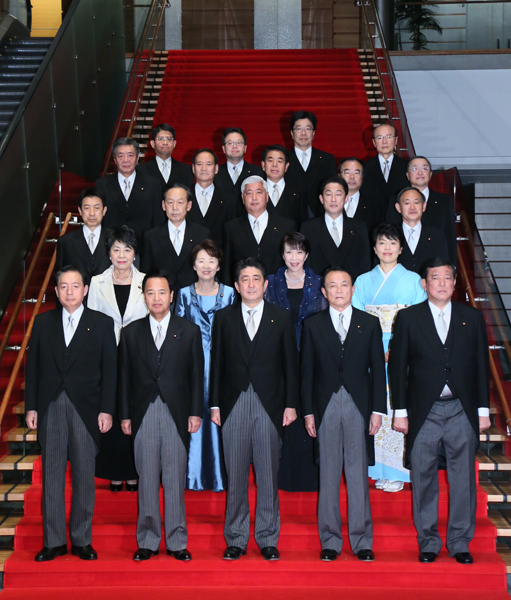
- Prime Minister Shinzō Abe (front row, centre) with the re-elected cabinet inside the Kantei, December 24, 2014
- Date formed: December 24, 2014
- Date dissolved: November 1, 2017

People and organisations
- Head of state: Emperor Akihito
- Head of government: Shinzō Abe
- Deputy head of government: Tarō Asō
- Member party: Liberal Democratic–Komeito coalition
- Status in legislature: Coalition government HoR (Lower): Supermajority; HoC (Upper): Majority
- Opposition party: Democratic Party of Japan (2014–2016)→ Democratic Party (2016–2017)→ Constitutional Democratic Party of Japan (2017)
- Opposition leader: Katsuya Okada (until October 1, 2016); Renhō (October 1, 2016 – July 27, 2017); Seiji Maehara (from July 27, 2017)

History
- Elections: 2014 general election 2016 councillors election
- Predecessor: Abe II
- Successor: Abe IV

The Third Abe cabinet governed Japan under the leadership of the prime minister, Shinzō Abe, from December 2014 to November 2017. The government was a coalition between the Liberal Democratic Party and the Komeito (which had changed its name from "New Komeito" in the 2012–2014 term) and controlled both the upper and lower houses of the National Diet.

Following the 2017 general election, the Third Abe cabinet was dissolved on November 1, 2017, and it was replaced by the Fourth Abe cabinet.

== Background ==
Following the snap "Abenomics Dissolution" and general election of 2014, Abe was re-elected by the Diet and chose to retain all the ministers from his previous cabinet except the defense minister, Akinori Eto, who had been involved in a money scandal. Abe explained that he aimed to avoid the disruption of another major personnel change only three months after the September cabinet reshuffle.

Abe conducted three reshuffles of his third administration. The first took place in October 2015 following his re-election to another three-year term as president of the LDP and the launch of his "Abenomics 2.0" policies. The second reshuffle occurred in August 2016, following the victory of the ruling coalition in the July 2016 upper house elections, the first time since 1989 that the LDP held an outright majority in the House of Councillors. The third reshuffle occurred in August 2017.

== Election of the prime minister ==
24 December 2014
House of Representatives Absolute majority (236/470) required
Choice	Vote	
Choice	Caucuses	Votes
Shinzō Abe	LDP (290), Independent [Speaker] (1), NKP (35), Others (2)	328 / 470
Katsuya Okada	DPJ (72), Independent [Vice-Speaker] (1)	73 / 470
Kenji Eda	Japan Innovation Party (41)	41 / 470
Kazuo Shii	JCP (18)	18 / 470
Takeo Hiranuma	PfG (2), Independent (1)	3 / 470
Tadatomo Yoshida	SDP (2)	2 / 470
Keiichirō Asao	Independent (1)	1 / 470
Toshinobu Nakazato	Independent (1)	1 / 470
Blank ballots	Independents/Others (2)	2 / 470
Unattributable vote	(1)	1 / 470
Source: 188th Diet Session (House of Representatives) (roll call only lists individual votes, not grouped by caucus)

24 December 2014
House of Councillors Absolute majority (121/240) required
Choice	Vote	
Choice	Caucuses	Votes
Shinzō Abe	LDP (113), NKP (20), AEJ (2)	135 / 240
Katsuya Okada	DPJ-SR (58), PLP (2), Independent [Vice-President] (1)	61 / 240
Kenji Eda	JIP (11)	11 / 240
Kazuo Shii	JCP (11)	11 / 240
Takeo Hiranuma	PFG (6)	6 / 240
Tadatomo Yoshida	SDP (3), Independent [OSMP (1)	4 / 240
Hiroyuki Arai	NRP-Group of Independents (2)	2 / 240
Kōta Matsuda	AEJ (2)	2 / 240
Tarō Yamada	AEJ (1)	1 / 240
Tarō Yamamoto	Independent (1)	1 / 240
Blank ballots	PFG (1), AEJ (1), Independent Club (4)	6 / 240
Source: 188th Diet Session (House of Councillors) (lists individual votes grouped by caucus)

== Lists of ministers ==
Liberal Democratic
Komeito
R = Member of the House of Representatives
C = Member of the House of Councillors
N = Non-Diet member

=== Cabinet ===
Third Abe cabinet from December 24, 2014 to October 7, 2015
Portfolio	Minister		Term
Prime minister	Shinzō Abe	R	December 26, 2012 – September 16, 2020
Deputy prime minister Minister of finance Minister of state for financial services Minister in charge of overcoming deflation	Tarō Asō	R	December 26, 2012 – October 4, 2021
Minister for internal affairs and communications	Sanae Takaichi	R	September 3, 2014 – August 3, 2017
Minister of justice	Yōko Kamikawa	R	October 20, 2014 – October 7, 2015
Minister of foreign affairs	Fumio Kishida	R	December 26, 2012 – August 3, 2017
Minister of education, culture, sports, science and technology Minister in charge of education rebuilding	Hakubun Shimomura	R	December 26, 2012 – October 7, 2015
Minister of health, labour, and welfare	Yasuhisa Shiozaki	R	September 3, 2014 – August 3, 2017
Minister of agriculture, forestry and fisheries	Koya Nishikawa	R	September 3, 2014 – February 23, 2015
Minister of agriculture, forestry and fisheries	Yoshimasa Hayashi	C	February 23, 2015 – October 7, 2015
Minister of economy, trade and industry Minister in charge of industrial competitiveness Minister in charge of the response to the economic impact caused by the nuclear accident Minister of state for the Nuclear Damage Compensation and Decommissioning; Facilitation Corporation	Yoichi Miyazawa	C	October 20, 2014 – October 7, 2015
Minister of land, infrastructure, transport and tourism Minister in charge of water cycle policy	Akihiro Ota	R	December 26, 2012 – October 7, 2015
Minister of the environment Minister of state for nuclear emergency preparedness	Yoshio Mochizuki	R	September 3, 2014 – October 7, 2015
Minister of defence Minister in charge of security legislation	Gen Nakatani	R	December 24, 2014 – August 3, 2016
Chief cabinet secretary Minister in charge of alleviating the burden of the bases in Okinawa	Yoshihide Suga	R	December 26, 2012 – September 16, 2020
Minister of reconstruction Minister in charge of comprehensive policy co-ordination for revival from the nuclear accident at Fukushima	Wataru Takeshita	R	September 3, 2014 – October 7, 2015
Chairperson of the National Public Safety Commission; Minister in charge of the abduction issue Minister in charge of ocean policy and territorial issues Minister in charge of building national resilience Minister of state for disaster management	Eriko Yamatani	C	September 3, 2014 – October 7, 2015
Minister of state for Okinawa and Northern Territories affairs Minister of state for consumer affairs and food safety Minister of state for science and technology policy Minister of state for space policy Minister in charge of information technology policy Minister in charge of "Challenge Again" initiative Minister in charge of "Cool Japan" Strategy	Shunichi Yamaguchi	R	September 3, 2014 – October 7, 2015
Minister in charge of support for women's empowerment Minister in charge of administrative reform Minister in charge of civil service reform Minister of state for regulatory reform Minister of state for measures for declining birthrate Minister of state for gender equality	Haruko Arimura	C	September 3, 2014 – October 7, 2015
Minister in charge of economic revitalization Minister in charge of total reform of social security and tax Minister of state for economic and fiscal policy	Akira Amari	R	December 26, 2012 – January 28, 2016
Minister in charge of overcoming population decline and vitalizing local economy in Japan; Minister of state for the National Strategic Special Zones	Shigeru Ishiba	R	September 3, 2014 – August 3, 2016
Minister in charge of the Tokyo Olympic and Paralympic Games	Toshiaki Endo	R	June 25, 2015 – August 3, 2016
Deputy Chief Cabinet Secretaries
Deputy Chief Cabinet Secretary (Political Affairs – House of Representatives)	Katsunobu Kato	R	December 26, 2012 – October 7, 2015
Deputy Chief Cabinet Secretary (Political Affairs – House of Councillors)	Hiroshige Seko	C	December 26, 2012 – August 13, 2016
Deputy Chief Cabinet Secretary (Bureaucrat)	Kazuhiro Sugita	–	December 26, 2012 – October 4, 2021

==== Changes ====
- February 23, 2015 – The agriculture minister, Koya Nishikawa, resigned because of a campaign finance scandal. His immediate predecessor, Yoshimasa Hayashi, was recalled to replace him.
- June 25, 2015 – A new position of minister for the Olympics was created. Toshiaki Endo was appointed the inaugural minister.

=== First reshuffled cabinet ===
Third Abe cabinet (First Reshuffle)
- 97th Cabinet of Japan

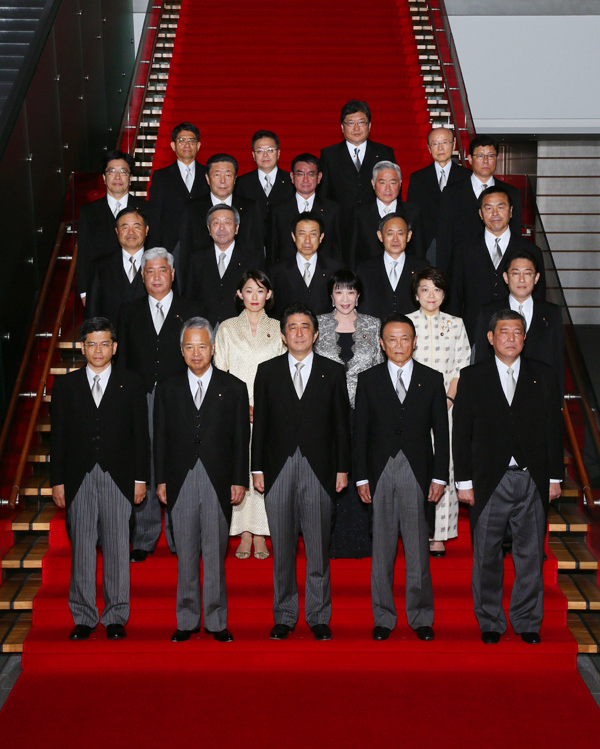
- Prime Minister Shinzō Abe (front row, centre) with his reshuffled cabinet inside the Kantei, October 7, 2015
- Date formed: October 7, 2015
- Date dissolved: August 3, 2016

People and organisations
- Head of state: Emperor Akihito
- Head of government: Shinzō Abe
- Deputy head of government: Tarō Asō
- Member party: Liberal Democratic–Komeito coalition
- Status in legislature: Coalition government HoR (Lower): Supermajority; HoC (Upper): Majority
- Opposition party: Democratic Party of Japan (2014–2016)→ Democratic Party (2016–2017)→ Constitutional Democratic Party of Japan (2017)
- Opposition leader: Katsuya Okada (until October 1, 2016); Renhō (October 1, 2016 – July 27, 2017); Seiji Maehara (from July 27, 2017)

History
- Elections: 2014 general election 2016 councillors election
- Predecessor: Third Abe Cabinet
- Successor: Third Abe Cabinet (Second Reshuffle)

Third Abe cabinet from October 7, 2015 to August 3, 2016
Portfolio	Minister		Term
Prime minister	Shinzō Abe	R	December 26, 2012 – September 16, 2020
Deputy prime minister Minister of finance Minister of state for financial services Minister in charge of overcoming deflation	Tarō Asō	R	December 26, 2012 – October 4, 2021
Minister for internal affairs and communications	Sanae Takaichi	R	September 3, 2014 – August 3, 2017
Minister of justice	Mitsuhide Iwaki	C→N	October 7, 2015 – August 3, 2016
Minister of foreign affairs	Fumio Kishida	R	December 26, 2012 – August 3, 2017
Minister of education, culture, sports, science and technology Minister in charge of education rebuilding	Hiroshi Hase	R	October 7, 2015 – August 3, 2016
Minister of health, labour, and welfare	Yasuhisa Shiozaki	R	September 3, 2014 – August 3, 2017
Minister of agriculture, forestry and fisheries	Hiroshi Moriyama	R	October 7, 2015 – August 3, 2016
Minister of economy, trade and industry Minister in charge of industrial competitiveness Minister in charge of the response to the economic impact caused by the nuclear accident Minister of state for the Nuclear Damage Compensation and Decommissioning; Facilitation Corporation	Motoo Hayashi	R	October 7, 2015 – August 3, 2016
Minister of land, infrastructure, transport and tourism Minister in charge of water cycle policy	Keiichi Ishii	R	October 7, 2015 – September 11, 2019
Minister of the environment Minister of state for nuclear emergency preparedness	Tamayo Marukawa	C	October 7, 2015 – August 3, 2016
Minister of defence	Gen Nakatani	R	December 24, 2014 – August 3, 2016
Chief cabinet secretary Minister in charge of alleviating the burden of the bases in Okinawa	Yoshihide Suga	R	December 26, 2012 – September 16, 2020
Minister of reconstruction Minister in charge of comprehensive policy co-ordination for revival from the nuclear accident at Fukushima	Tsuyoshi Takagi	R	October 7, 2015 – August 3, 2016
Chairman of the National Public Safety Commission; Minister in charge of administrative reform Minister in charge of civil service reform Minister of state for consumer affairs and food safety Minister of state for regulatory reform Minister of state for disaster management	Taro Kono	R	October 7, 2015 – August 3, 2016
Minister of state for Okinawa and Northern Territories affairs Minister of state for science and technology policy Minister of state for space policy Minister in charge of ocean policy and territorial issues Minister in charge of information technology policy Minister in charge of "Cool Japan" strategy	Aiko Shimajiri	C→N	October 7, 2015 – August 3, 2016
Minister in charge of economic revitalization Minister in charge of total reform of social security and tax Minister of state for economic and fiscal policy	Akira Amari	R	December 26, 2012 – January 28, 2016
Minister in charge of economic revitalization Minister in charge of total reform of social security and tax Minister of state for economic and fiscal policy	Nobuteru Ishihara	R	January 28, 2016 – August 3, 2017
Minister for promoting dynamic engagement of all citizens Minister in charge of women's empowerment Minister in charge of "Challenge Again" initiative Minister in charge of the abduction issue Minister in charge of building national resilience Minister of state for measures for declining birthrate Minister of state for gender equality	Katsunobu Katō	R	October 7, 2015 – August 3, 2017
Minister in charge of overcoming population decline and vitalizing local economy in Japan; Minister of State for the National Strategic Special Zones	Shigeru Ishiba	R	September 3, 2014 – August 3, 2016
Minister in charge of the Tokyo Olympic and Paralympic Games	Toshiaki Endo	R	June 25, 2015 – August 3, 2016
Deputy Chief Cabinet Secretaries
Deputy Chief Cabinet Secretary (Political Affairs – House of Representatives)	Kōichi Hagiuda	R	October 7, 2015 – August 3, 2017
Deputy Chief Cabinet Secretary (Political Affairs – House of Councillors)	Hiroshige Seko	C	December 26, 2012 – August 13, 2016
Deputy Chief Cabinet Secretary (Bureaucrat)	Kazuhiro Sugita	–	December 26, 2012 – October 4, 2021

==== Changes ====
- January 28, 2016 – The economic revitalization minister, Akira Amari, resignedbecause of a bribery scandal and was replaced with Nobuteru Ishihara.
- July 2016 – The justice minister, Mitsuhide Iwaki, and the Okinawa minister, Aiko Shimajiri, lost their seats in the House of Councillors election but remained in office as ministers until the August cabinet reshuffle.

=== Second reshuffled cabinet ===
Third Abe cabinet (Second Reshuffle)
- 97th Cabinet of Japan

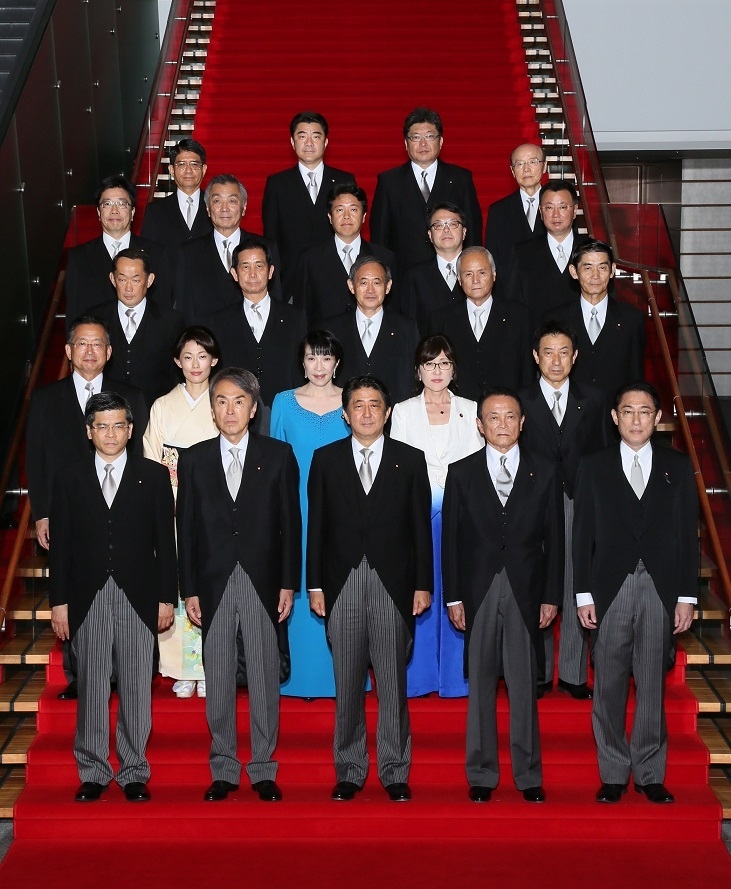
- Prime Minister Shinzō Abe (front row, centre) with his reshuffled cabinet inside the Kantei, August 3, 2016
- Date formed: August 3, 2016
- Date dissolved: August 3, 2017

People and organisations
- Head of state: Emperor Akihito
- Head of government: Shinzō Abe
- Deputy head of government: Tarō Asō
- Member party: Liberal Democratic–Komeito coalition
- Status in legislature: Coalition government HoR (Lower): Supermajority; HoC (Upper): Majority
- Opposition party: Democratic Party of Japan (2014–2016)→ Democratic Party (2016–2017)→ Constitutional Democratic Party of Japan (2017)
- Opposition leader: Katsuya Okada (until October 1, 2016); Renhō (October 1, 2016 – July 27, 2017); Seiji Maehara (from July 27, 2017)

History
- Elections: 2014 general election 2016 councillors election
- Predecessor: Third Abe cabinet (First Reshuffle)
- Successor: Third Abe cabinet (Third Reshuffle)

Third Abe cabinet from August 3, 2016 to August 3, 2017
Portfolio	Minister		Term
Prime minister	Shinzō Abe	R	December 26, 2012 – September 16, 2021
Deputy prime minister Minister of finance Minister of state for financial services Minister in charge of overcoming deflation	Tarō Asō	R	December 26, 2012 – October 4, 2021
Minister for internal affairs and communications Minister of state for the social security and tax number system	Sanae Takaichi	R	September 3, 2014 – August 3, 2017
Minister of justice	Katsutoshi Kaneda	R	August 3, 2016 – August 3, 2017
Minister of foreign affairs	Fumio Kishida	R	December 26, 2012 – August 3, 2017
Minister of education, culture, sports, science and technology Minister in charge of education rebuilding	Hirokazu Matsuno	R	August 3, 2016 – August 3, 2017
Minister of health, labour, and welfare	Yasuhisa Shiozaki	R	September 3, 2014 – August 3, 2017
Minister of agriculture, forestry and fisheries	Yuji Yamamoto	R	August 3, 2016 – August 3, 2017
Minister of economy, trade and industry Minister in charge of industrial competitiveness Minister for economic co-operation with Russia; Minister in charge of the response to the economic impact caused by the nuclear accident Minister of state for the Nuclear Damage Compensation and Decommissioning; Facilitation Corporation	Hiroshige Sekō	C	August 3, 2016 – September 11, 2019
Minister of land, infrastructure, transport and tourism Minister in charge of water cycle policy	Keiichi Ishii	R	October 7, 2015 – September 11, 2019
Minister of the environment Minister of state for nuclear emergency preparedness	Koichi Yamamoto	R	August 3, 2016 – August 3, 2017
Minister of defence	Tomomi Inada	R	August 3, 2016 – July 28, 2017
Chief cabinet secretary Minister in charge of alleviating the burden of the bases in Okinawa	Yoshihide Suga	R	December 26, 2012 – September 16, 2020
Minister of reconstruction Minister in charge of comprehensive policy co-ordination for revival from the nuclear accident at Fukushima	Masahiro Imamura	R	August 3, 2016 – April 26, 2017
Minister of reconstruction Minister in charge of comprehensive policy co-ordination for revival from the nuclear accident at Fukushima	Masayoshi Yoshino	R	April 26, 2017 – October 2, 2018
Chairman of the National Public Safety Commission; Minister in charge of ocean policy and territorial issues Minister in charge of building national resilience Minister of state for consumer affairs and food safety Minister of state for disaster management	Jun Matsumoto	R	August 3, 2016 – August 3, 2017
Minister of state for Okinawa and Northern Territories affairs Minister of state for "Cool Japan" strategy Minister of State for the intellectual property strategy Minister of state for science and technology policy Minister of state for space policy Minister in charge of information technology policy	Yōsuke Tsuruho	C	August 3, 2016 – August 3, 2017
Minister in charge of economic revitalization Minister in charge of total reform of social security and tax Minister of state for economic and fiscal policy	Nobuteru Ishihara	R	January 28, 2016 – August 3, 2017
Minister for promoting dynamic engagement of all citizens Minister for working-style reform Minister in charge of women's empowerment Minister in charge of "Challenge Again" initiative Minister in charge of the abduction issue Minister of state for measures for declining birthrate Minister of state for gender equality	Katsunobu Katō	R	October 7, 2015 – August 3, 2017
Minister in charge of overcoming population decline and vitalizing local economy in Japan; Minister of state for regulatory reform Minister in charge of overcoming population decline and vitalizing local economy in Japan; Minister in charge of administrative reform Minister in charge of civil service reform	Kozo Yamamoto	R	August 3, 2016 – August 3, 2017
Minister in charge of the Tokyo Olympic and Paralympic Games	Tamayo Marukawa	C	August 3, 2016 – August 3, 2017
Deputy Chief Cabinet Secretaries
Deputy Chief Cabinet Secretary (Political Affairs – House of Representatives)	Kōichi Hagiuda	R	October 7, 2015 – August 3, 2017
Deputy Chief Cabinet Secretary (Political Affairs – House of Councillors)	Kōtarō Nogami	C	August 13, 2016 – September 11, 2019
Deputy Chief Cabinet Secretary (Bureaucrat)	Kazuhiro Sugita	–	December 26, 2012 – October 4, 2021

==== Changes ====
- April 26, 2017 – The reconstruction minister, Masahiro Imamura, was dismissed because of comments he made about the 2011 Tōhoku earthquake and tsunami and was replaced by Masayoshi Yoshino.
- July 28, 2017 – The defense minister, Tomomi Inada, resigned.

=== Third reshuffled cabinet ===
Third Abe cabinet (Third Reshuffle)
- 97th Cabinet of Japan

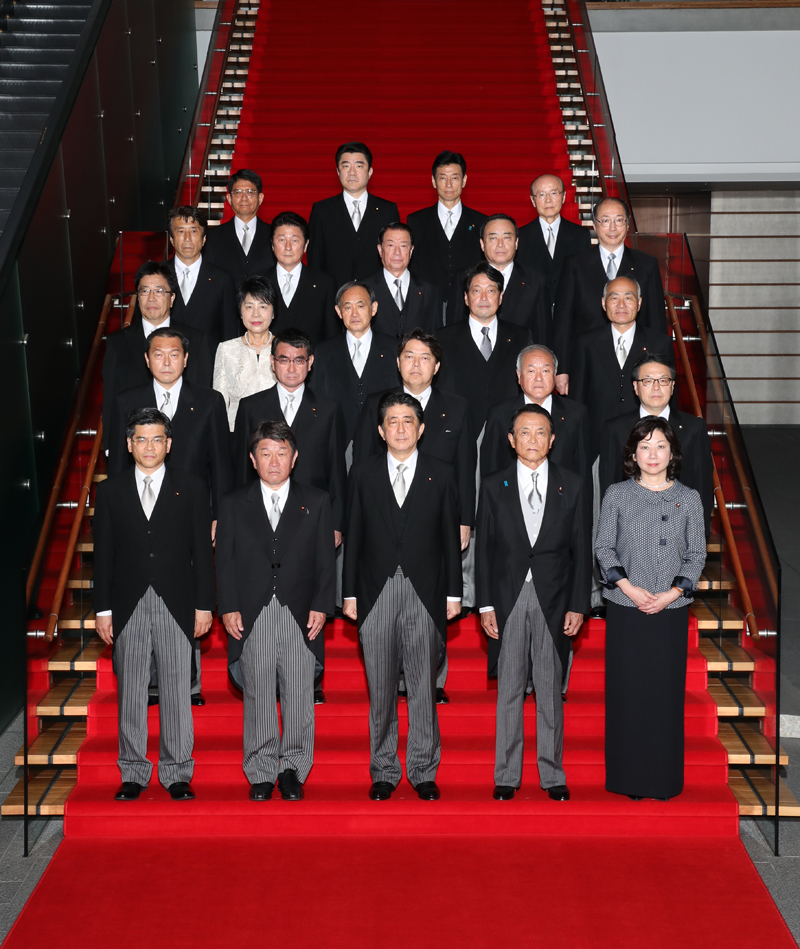
- Prime Minister Shinzō Abe (front row, centre) with his reshuffled cabinet inside the Kantei, August 3, 2017
- Date formed: August 3, 2017
- Date dissolved: November 1, 2017

People and organisations
- Head of state: Emperor Akihito
- Head of government: Shinzō Abe
- Deputy head of government: Tarō Asō
- Member party: Liberal Democratic–Komeito coalition
- Status in legislature: Coalition government HoR (Lower): Supermajority; HoC (Upper): Majority
- Opposition party: Democratic Party of Japan (2014–2016)→ Democratic Party (2016–2017)→ Constitutional Democratic Party of Japan (2017)
- Opposition leader: Katsuya Okada (until October 1, 2016); Renhō (October 1, 2016 – July 27, 2017); Seiji Maehara (from July 27, 2017)

History
- Elections: 2014 general election 2016 councillors election
- Predecessor: Third Abe Cabinet (Second Reshuffle)
- Successor: Fourth Abe Cabinet

Third Abe cabinet from August 3, 2017 to November 1, 2017
Portfolio	Minister		Term
Prime minister	Shinzō Abe	R	December 26, 2012 – September 16, 2020
Deputy prime minister Minister of finance Minister of state for financial services Minister in charge of overcoming deflation	Tarō Asō	R	December 26, 2012 – October 4, 2021
Minister for internal affairs and communications Minister in charge of women's empowerment Minister of state for the social security and tax number system	Seiko Noda	R	August 3, 2017 – October 2, 2018
Minister of justice	Yōko Kamikawa	R	August 3, 2017 – October 2, 2018
Minister of foreign affairs	Taro Kono	R	August 3, 2017 – September 11, 2019
Minister of education, culture, sports, science and technology Minister in charge of education rebuilding	Yoshimasa Hayashi	R	August 3, 2017 – October 2, 2018
Minister of health, labour, and welfare Minister for working-style reform Minister in charge of the abduction issue Minister of state for the abduction issue	Katsunobu Katō	R	August 3, 2017 – October 2, 2018
Minister of agriculture, forestry and fisheries	Ken Saitō	R	August 3, 2017 – October 2, 2018
Minister of economy, trade and industry Minister in charge of industrial competitiveness Minister for economic co-operation with Russia; Minister in charge of the response to the economic impact caused by the nuclear accident Minister of state for the Nuclear Damage Compensation and Decommissioning; Facilitation Corporation	Hiroshige Sekō	C	August 3, 2016 – September 11, 2019
Minister of land, infrastructure, transport and tourism Minister in charge of water cycle policy	Keiichi Ishii	R	October 7, 2015 – September 11, 2019
Minister of the environment Minister of state for nuclear emergency preparedness	Masaharu Nakagawa	C	August 3, 2017 – October 2, 2018
Minister of defence	Itsunori Onodera	R	August 3, 2017 – October 2, 2018
Chief cabinet secretary Minister in charge of alleviating the burden of the bases in Okinawa	Yoshihide Suga	R	December 26, 2012 – September 16, 2020
Minister of reconstruction Minister in charge of comprehensive policy coordination for revival from the nuclear accident at Fukushima	Masayoshi Yoshino	R	April 26, 2017 – October 2, 2018
Chairperson of the National Public Safety Commission; Minister in charge of building national resilience Minister of state for disaster management	Hachiro Okonogi	R	August 3, 2017 – October 2, 2018
Minister of state for Okinawa and Northern Territories affairs Minister of state for consumer affairs and food safety Minister of state for ocean policy Minister in charge of territorial issues	Tetsuma Esaki	R	August 3, 2017 – February 27, 2018
Minister in charge of economic revitalization Minister in charge of total reform of social security and tax Minister of state for economic and fiscal policy	Toshimitsu Motegi	R	August 3, 2017 – September 11, 2019
Minister for promoting dynamic engagement of all citizens Minister in charge of information technology policy Minister of state for measures for declining birthrate Minister of state for gender equality Minister of state for "Cool Japan" strategy Minister of state for the intellectual property strategy Minister of state for science and technology policy Minister of state for space policy	Masaji Matsuyama	C	August 3, 2017 – October 2, 2018
Minister of state for regional revitalization Minister of state for regulatory reform Minister in charge of regional revitalization Minister in charge of administrative reform Minister in charge of civil service reform	Hiroshi Kajiyama	R	August 3, 2017 – October 2, 2018
Minister in charge of the Tokyo Olympic and Paralympic Games	Shunichi Suzuki	R	August 3, 2017 – October 2, 2018
Deputy Chief Cabinet Secretaries
Deputy Chief Cabinet Secretary (Political Affairs – House of Representatives)	Yasutoshi Nishimura	R	August 3, 2017 – September 11, 2019
Deputy Chief Cabinet Secretary (Political Affairs – House of Councillors)	Kōtarō Nogami	C	August 13, 2016 – September 11, 2019
Deputy Chief Cabinet Secretary (Bureaucrat)	Kazuhiro Sugita	–	December 26, 2012 – October 4, 2021

Preceded by Second Abe cabinet	Cabinet of Japan; 2014–2017	Succeeded by Fourth Abe cabinet
