= Second Abe cabinet =

96th Cabinet of Japan (2012–2014)

- 96th Cabinet of Japan
- 26 December 2012 – 24 December 2014
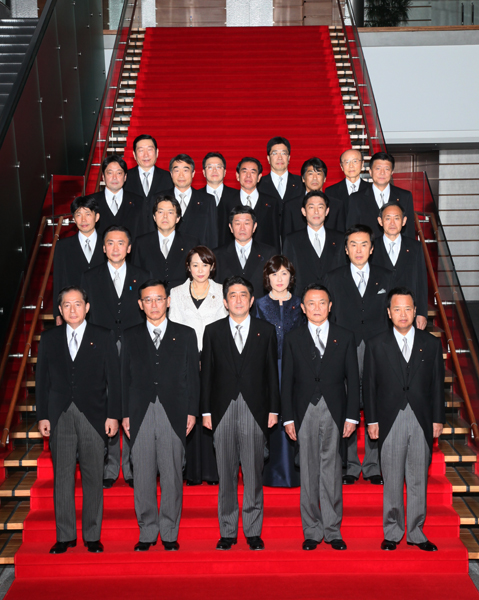
- Prime Minister Shinzō Abe (front row, centre) with the newly-elected cabinet inside the Kantei, December 26, 2012
- Date formed: December 26, 2012
- Date dissolved: December 24, 2014

People and organisations
- Head of state: Emperor Akihito
- Head of government: Shinzō Abe
- Deputy head of government: Tarō Asō
- Member party: Liberal Democratic–New Komeito Coalition
- Status in legislature: Divided Diet (Until 2013); HoR: Coalition supermajority HoC: Coalition minority (Before 2013), majority (After 2013)
- Opposition party: Democratic Party of Japan
- Opposition leader: Banri Kaieda

History
- Elections: 2012 general election 2013 councillors election
- Predecessor: Noda
- Successor: Abe III

The Second Abe cabinet governed Japan under the leadership of Prime Minister Shinzō Abe from December 2012 to December 2014. Following the return to power of the LDP in the 2012 general election, Abe, as party president, was elected Prime Minister by the National Diet on December 26, 2012, and presented his cabinet for swearing in by the Emperor later that day. Abe formed a coalition with the New Komeito Party, which has partnered with the LDP since the late 1990s, appointing former leader Akihiro Ota as Minister of Land. Together the two parties controlled a two-thirds majority in the House of Representatives, allowing the new government in most matters to override the veto of the upper house which was controlled by the opposition parties until July 2013.

This cabinet was the most stable in post-war Japanese history, with no ministerial changes for 617 days until Abe conducted a reshuffle on September 3, 2014. The core ministers for Finance, Foreign Affairs, Economic Revival, Education, Land and the Chief Cabinet Secretary were all kept in post. In addition, Abe promoted 3 women to cabinet, matching the Koizumi cabinet's record of 5 women ministers.

Following the 2014 general election, the Second Abe cabinet was dissolved on December 24, 2014, and replaced with the Third Abe cabinet.

== Election of the prime minister ==
26 December 2012
House of Representatives
Choice	Vote	
Choice	Parties	Votes
Shinzō Abe	LDP (294), NKP (31), Independents (3)	328 / 480
Banri Kaieda	DPJ (57)	57 / 480
Shintaro Ishihara	JRP (54)	54 / 480
Yoshimi Watanabe	YP (18)	18 / 480
Kazuo Shii	Communist (8)	8 / 480
Yuko Mori	PLP (7)	7 / 480
Mizuho Fukushima	SDP (2)	2 / 480
Shozaburo Jimi	PNP (1)	1 / 480
Abstentions	Independents (2)	2 / 480
Source: 182nd Diet, December 26 House of Representatives plenary session

182nd Diet, 26 December 2012 House of Councillors plenary session
Designation of a prime minister
Candidate	First round	Runoff
Shinzō Abe	107	107
Banri Kaieda	87	96
Yoshimi Watanabe	11	–
Yūko Mori	8	–
Kazuo Shii	6	–
Mizuho Fukushima	5	–
Shōzaburō Jimi	3	–
Shintarō Ishihara	3	–
Shizuka Kamei	1	–
Invalid votes	0	1
Blank ballots	3	30
Total votes cast	234 (→majority at 118)	234

== Lists of ministers ==
Liberal Democratic
New Komeito
R = Member of the House of Representatives
C = Member of the House of Councillors

=== Cabinet ===
Second Abe Cabinet from December 26, 2012 to September 3, 2014
Portfolio	Minister		Term
Prime Minister	Shinzō Abe	R	December 26, 2012 – September 16, 2020
Deputy Prime Minister; Minister of Finance; Minister of State for Financial Services; Minister in charge of Overcoming Deflation and Countering Yen Appreciation	Tarō Asō	R	December 26, 2012 – October 4, 2021
Minister for Internal Affairs and Communications; Minister of State for Decentralization Reform; Minister in charge of Regional Revitalization; Minister in charge of Regional Government	Yoshitaka Shindō	R	December 26, 2012 – September 3, 2014
Minister of Justice	Sadakazu Tanigaki	R	December 26, 2012 – September 3, 2014
Minister of Foreign Affairs	Fumio Kishida	R	December 26, 2012 – August 3, 2017
Minister of Education, Culture, Sports, Science and Technology; Minister in charge of Education Rebuilding; Minister in charge of the Tokyo Olympic and Paralympic Games	Hakubun Shimomura	R	December 26, 2012 – October 7, 2015
Minister of Health, Labour, and Welfare	Norihisa Tamura	R	December 26, 2012 – September 3, 2014
Minister of Agriculture, Forestry and Fisheries	Yoshimasa Hayashi	C	December 26, 2012 – September 3, 2014
Minister of Economy, Trade and Industry; Minister of State for the Nuclear Damage Compensation Facilitation Corporation; Minister in charge of the Response to the Economic Impact caused by the Nuclear Accident; Minister in charge of Industrial Competitiveness	Toshimitsu Motegi	R	December 26, 2012 – September 3, 2014
Minister of Land, Infrastructure, Transport and Tourism	Akihiro Ota	R	December 26, 2012 – October 7, 2015
Minister of the Environment; Minister of State for Nuclear Emergency Preparedness	Nobuteru Ishihara	R	December 26, 2012 – September 3, 2014
Minister of Defence	Itsunori Onodera	R	December 26, 2012 – September 3, 2014
Chief Cabinet Secretary; Minister in charge of Strengthening National Security	Yoshihide Suga	R	December 26, 2012 – September 16, 2021
Minister of Reconstruction; Minister in charge of Comprehensive Policy Coordination for Revival from the Nuclear; Accident at Fukushima	Takumi Nemoto	R	December 26, 2012 – September 3, 2014
Chairman of the National Public Safety Commission; Minister in charge of the Abduction Issue; Minister in charge of Building National Resilience; Minister of State for Disaster Management	Keiji Furuya	R	December 26, 2012 – September 3, 2014
Minister of State for Okinawa and Northern Territories Affairs; Minister of State for Science and Technology Policy; Minister of State for Space Policy; Minister in charge of Information Technology Policy; Minister in charge of Ocean Policy and Territorial Issues	Ichita Yamamoto	C	December 26, 2012 – September 3, 2014
Minister in charge of Support for Women's Empowerment and Child-Rearing; Minister of State for Consumer Affairs and Food Safety; Minister of State for Measures for Declining Birthrate; Minister of State for Gender Equality	Masako Mori	C	December 26, 2012 – September 3, 2014
Minister in charge of Economic Revitalization; Minister in charge of Total Reform of Social Security and Tax; Minister of State for Economic and Fiscal Policy	Akira Amari	R	December 26, 2012 – January 28, 2016
Minister in charge of Administrative Reform; Minister in charge of Civil Service Reform; Minister in charge of "Cool Japan" Strategy; Minister in charge of "Challenge Again" Initiative; Minister of State for Regulatory Reform	Tomomi Inada	R	December 26, 2012 – September 3, 2014
Deputy Chief Cabinet Secretaries
Deputy Chief Cabinet Secretary (Political Affairs – House of Representatives)	Katsunobu Kato	R	December 26, 2012 – October 7, 2015
Deputy Chief Cabinet Secretary (Political Affairs – House of Councillors)	Hiroshige Seko	C	December 26, 2012 – August 13, 2016
Deputy Chief Cabinet Secretary (Bureaucrat)	Kazuhiro Sugita	–	December 26, 2012 – October 4, 2021

=== Reshuffled cabinet ===
Second Abe Cabinet (Reshuffle)
- 96th Cabinet of Japan

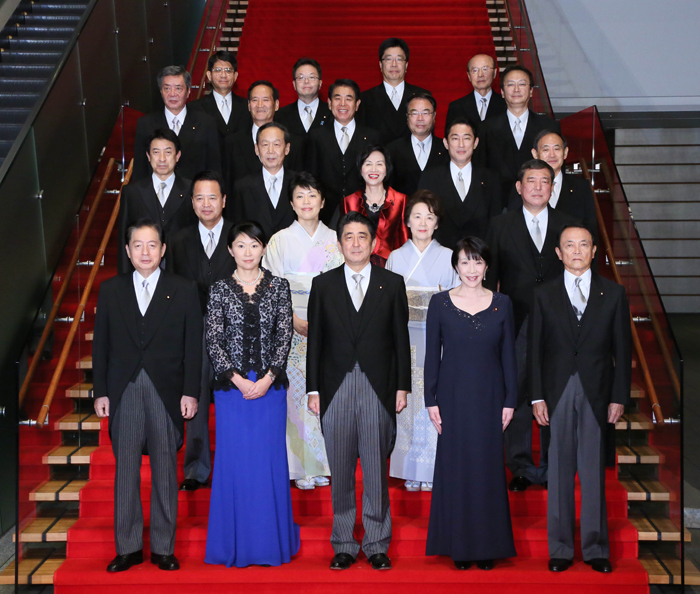
- Prime Minister Shinzō Abe (front row, centre) with his reshuffled cabinet inside the Kantei, September 3, 2014
- Date formed: September 3, 2014
- Date dissolved: December 24, 2014

People and organisations
- Head of state: Emperor Akihito
- Head of government: Shinzō Abe
- Deputy head of government: Tarō Asō
- Member party: Liberal Democratic–New Komeito Coalition
- Status in legislature: Divided Diet (Until 2013); HoR: Coalition supermajority HoC: Coalition minority (Before 2013), majority (After 2013)
- Opposition party: Democratic Party of Japan
- Opposition leader: Banri Kaieda

History
- Elections: 2012 general election 2013 councillors election
- Predecessor: Second Abe Cabinet
- Successor: Third Abe Cabinet

Second Abe Cabinet from September 3, 2014 to December 24, 2014
Portfolio	Minister		Term
Prime Minister	Shinzō Abe	R	December 26, 2012 – September 16, 2020
Deputy Prime Minister; Minister of Finance; Minister of State for Financial Services; Minister in charge of Overcoming Deflation	Tarō Asō	R	December 26, 2012 – October 4, 2021
Minister for Internal Affairs and Communications	Sanae Takaichi	R	September 3, 2014 – August 3, 2017
Minister of Justice	Midori Matsushima	R	September 3, 2014 – October 20, 2014
Minister of Justice	Yōko Kamikawa	R	October 20, 2014 – October 7, 2015
Minister of Foreign Affairs	Fumio Kishida	R	December 26, 2012 – August 3, 2017
Minister of Education, Culture, Sports, Science and Technology; Minister in charge of Education Rebuilding; Minister in charge of the Tokyo Olympic and Paralympic Games	Hakubun Shimomura	R	December 26, 2012 – October 7, 2015
Minister of Health, Labour, and Welfare	Yasuhisa Shiozaki	R	September 3, 2014 – August 3, 2017
Minister of Agriculture, Forestry and Fisheries	Koya Nishikawa	R	September 3, 2014 – February 23, 2015
Minister of Economy, Trade and Industry; Minister in charge of Industrial Competitiveness; Minister in charge of the Response to the Economic Impact caused by the Nuclear Accident; Minister of State for the Nuclear Damage Compensation and Decommissioning; Facilitation Corporation	Yūko Obuchi	R	September 3, 2014 – October 20, 2014
Minister of Economy, Trade and Industry; Minister in charge of Industrial Competitiveness; Minister in charge of the Response to the Economic Impact caused by the Nuclear Accident; Minister of State for the Nuclear Damage Compensation and Decommissioning; Facilitation Corporation	Yoichi Miyazawa	C	October 20, 2014 – October 7, 2015
Minister of Land, Infrastructure, Transport and Tourism; Minister in charge of Water Cycle Policy	Akihiro Ota	R	December 26, 2012 – October 7, 2015
Minister of the Environment; Minister of State for Nuclear Emergency Preparedness	Yoshio Mochizuki	R	September 3, 2014 – October 7, 2015
Minister of Defence; Minister in charge of Security Legislation	Akinori Eto	R	September 3, 2014 – December 24, 2014
Chief Cabinet Secretary; Minister in charge of Alleviating the Burden of the Bases in Okinawa	Yoshihide Suga	R	December 26, 2012 – September 16, 2020
Minister of Reconstruction; Minister in charge of Comprehensive Policy Coordination for Revival from the Nuclear; Accident at Fukushima	Wataru Takeshita	R	September 3, 2014 – October 7, 2015
Chairman of the National Public Safety Commission; Minister in charge of the Abduction Issue; Minister in charge of Ocean Policy and Territorial Issues; Minister in charge of Building National Resilience; Minister of State for Disaster Management	Eriko Yamatani	C	September 3, 2014 – October 7, 2015
Minister of State for Okinawa and Northern Territories Affairs; Minister of State for Science and Technology Policy; Minister of State for Space Policy; Minister in charge of Information Technology Policy; Minister in charge of "Challenge Again" Initiative; Minister in charge of "Cool Japan" Strategy	Shunichi Yamaguchi	R	September 3, 2014 – October 7, 2015
Minister in charge of Support for Women's Empowerment; Minister in charge of Administrative Reform; Minister in charge of Civil Service Reform; Minister of State for Consumer Affairs and Food Safety; Minister of State for Regulatory Reform; Minister of State for Measures for Declining Birthrate; Minister of State for Gender Equality	Haruko Arimura	C	September 3, 2014 – October 7, 2015
Minister in charge of Economic Revitalization; Minister in charge of Total Reform of Social Security and Tax; Minister of State for Economic and Fiscal Policy	Akira Amari	R	December 26, 2012 – January 28, 2016
Minister in charge of Overcoming Population Decline and Vitalizing Local Economy in Japan; Minister of State for the National Strategic Special Zones	Shigeru Ishiba	R	September 3, 2014 – August 3, 2016
Deputy Chief Cabinet Secretaries
Deputy Chief Cabinet Secretary (Political Affairs – House of Representatives)	Katsunobu Kato	R	December 26, 2012 – October 7, 2015
Deputy Chief Cabinet Secretary (Political Affairs – House of Councillors)	Hiroshige Seko	C	December 26, 2012 – August 13, 2016
Deputy Chief Cabinet Secretary (Bureaucrat)	Kazuhiro Sugita	–	December 26, 2012 – October 4, 2021

==== Changes ====
- October 20 – Justice Minister Midori Matsushima and Economy Minister Yūko Obuchi, both resigned due to campaign finance scandals, and were replaced with Yōko Kamikawa and Yoichi Miyazawa, respectively. This reduced the number of women in cabinet to 4.

Preceded by Noda cabinet	Cabinet of Japan; 2012–2014	Succeeded by Third Abe cabinet
