= Minister for the Abduction Issue =

The Minister for the Abduction Issue (拉致問題担当大臣, rachi mondai tantō daijin) is a member of the Cabinet of Japan responsible for addressing the issue of North Korean abductions of Japanese citizens. The minister reports to the Headquarters for the Abduction Issue (拉致問題対策本部, rachi mondai taisaku honbu).

As of October 2025, the minister in charge of the abduction issue is Minoru Kihara.

== List of ministers ==
#	Image	Name	Took office	Left office	Cabinet
21st century
1		Yasuhisa Shiozaki	September 26, 2006	August 27, 2007	Shinzō Abe
2		Kaoru Yosano	August 27, 2007	September 26, 2007	Shinzō Abe
3		Machimura Nobutaka	September 26, 2007	August 2, 2008	Yasuo Fukuda
4		Kyoko Nakayama	August 2, 2008	September 24, 2008	Yasuo Fukuda
5		Takeo Kawamura	September 24, 2008	September 16, 2009	Tarō Asō
6		Hiroshi Nakai	September 16, 2009	September 17, 2010	Yukio Hatoyama; Naoto Kan
7		Minoru Yanagida	September 17, 2010	November 22, 2010	Naoto Kan
8		Yoshito Sengoku	November 22, 2010	January 14, 2011	Naoto Kan
9		Kansei Nakano	January 14, 2011	September 2, 2011	Naoto Kan
10		Kenji Yamaoka	September 2, 2011	January 13, 2012	Yoshihiko Noda
11		Jin Matsubara	January 13, 2012	October 1, 2012	Yoshihiko Noda
12		Keishu Tanaka	October 1, 2012	October 23, 2012	Yoshihiko Noda
13		Osamu Fujimura	October 24, 2012	December 26, 2012	Yoshihiko Noda
14		Keiji Furuya	December 26, 2012	September 3, 2014	Shinzō Abe
15		Eriko Yamatani	September 3, 2014	October 7, 2015	Shinzō Abe
16		Katsunobu Katō	October 7, 2015	October 2, 2018	Shinzō Abe
16		Katsunobu Katō	September 11, 2019	October 4, 2021	Shinzō Abe
17		Hirokazu Matsuno	October 4, 2021	December 14, 2023	Fumio Kishida
18		Yoshimasa Hayashi	December 14, 2023	October 21, 2025	Fumio Kishida; Shigeru Ishiba
19		Minoru Kihara	October 21, 2025	Incumbent	Sanae Takaichi
