= Tomomi Inada =

Japanese politician (born 1959)

- 稲田 朋美
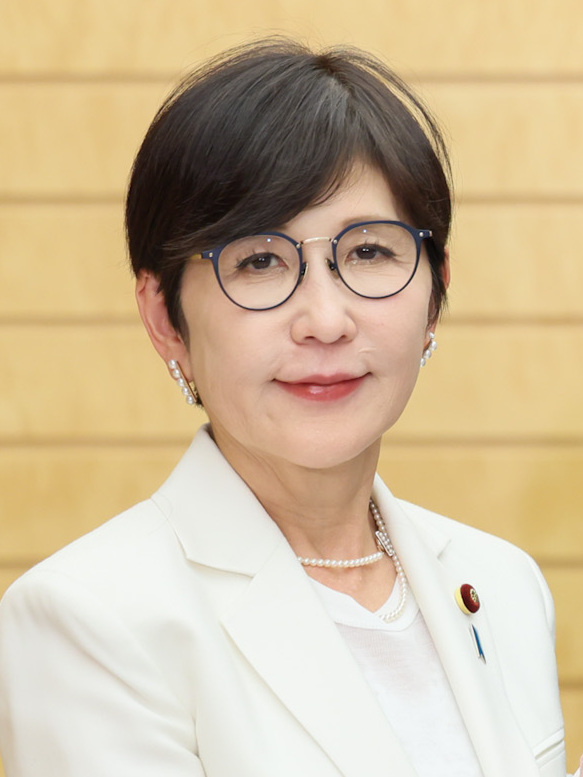
- Inada in 2024

Minister of Defense
- In office 3 August 2016 – 28 July 2017
- Prime Minister: Shinzo Abe
- Preceded by: Gen Nakatani
- Succeeded by: Fumio Kishida (acting); Itsunori Onodera
Junior ministerial offices
Minister of Administrative Reform
In office 26 December 2012 – 3 September 2014
| Prime Minister | Shinzo Abe |
| Preceded by | Katsuya Okada |
| Succeeded by | Haruko Arimura |
Minister in charge of Civil Service Reform
In office 26 December 2012 – 3 September 2014
| Prime Minister | Shinzo Abe |
| Preceded by | Katsuya Okada |
| Succeeded by | Haruko Arimura |
Minister in charge of the Cool Japan Strategy
In office 26 December 2012 – 3 September 2014
| Prime Minister | Shinzo Abe |
| Preceded by | Office established |
| Succeeded by | Shunichi Yamaguchi |
Minister in charge of the Challenge Again Initiative
In office 26 December 2012 – 3 September 2014
| Prime Minister | Shinzo Abe |
| Preceded by | Office established |
| Succeeded by | Shunichi Yamaguchi |
Minister of State for Regulatory Reform
In office 26 December 2012 – 3 September 2014
| Prime Minister | Shinzo Abe |
| Preceded by | Office established |
| Succeeded by | Haruko Arimura |

Member of the House of Representatives from Fukui 1st district
- Incumbent
- Assumed office 12 September 2005
- Preceded by: Isao Matsumiya
- Majority: 78,969 (50.00%)

Personal details
- Born: Tomomi Tsubakihara; 20 February 1959 (age 67) Echizen, Fukui, Japan
- Party: Liberal Democratic
- Spouse: Ryuji Inada (m. 1989)
- Children: 2
- Education: Waseda University
- Website: Official website

Tomomi Inada (稲田 朋美, Inada Tomomi; born 20 February 1959) is a Japanese lawyer and politician serving as a member of the House of Representatives, representing the 1st Fukui Prefecture since September 2005. She previously served as Minister of Defense from August 2016 to July 2017, resigning in response to a cover up scandal within the Japanese Ministry of Defense. She spent time as the Chairwoman of the Policy Research Council of the Liberal Democratic Party in her fourth term as a member of the House of Representatives in the Diet (national legislature). She is a native of Fukui Prefecture.

She expresses skepticism that comfort women, forced prostitutes for Japan in World War II, were compelled to work. She also does not accept the international consensus on the number of deaths of the Nanjing Massacre. She was implicated in the 2023–2024 Japanese slush fund scandal for over failing to record over 820,000 yen, but denied any responsibility for the scandal.

== Law career ==
After graduating from Waseda University in 1981, Inada became a lawyer in 1985. She initially belonged to the Osaka Bar Association but since 2008 has belonged to the Fukui Bar Association. She stood for the government in a lawsuit relating to Yasukuni Shrine, and served as an attorney for the plaintiff concerning the hundred man killing contest that occurred during the Second Sino-Japanese War, as well as the commanders who fought in the Battle of Okinawa and a bereaved family suing Kenzaburō Ōe and Iwanami Shoten for their defamation of character towards the commanders.

When she served as an attorney for the families of the plaintiff concerning the hundred man killing contest, she tried to win her points relative to the convicted war criminals in court. But her side lost, because the judges at the Supreme Court of Japan admitted some testimonies. After the failure of the trial, she hoped to become a politician.

== Political career ==
=== 2005 ===
On 15 August 2005, after being "spotted ... when she addressed a ruling-party audience on Japan's war crimes in 2005", Inada was nominated as an official candidate of the LDP by Shinzō Abe (later the Prime Minister). Inada ran in the general election held on 11 September 2005 and was elected to the House of Representatives for the first time.

=== 2009 ===
The 45th Japanese general election was held on 30 August 2009. Inada was re-elected to the House of Representatives with 50.0% of the vote. Inada's main opponent, DPJ candidate Ryūzō Sasaki, obtained 45.6% of the popular vote.

=== 2012 ===
The 46th Japanese general election was held on 16 December 2012. Inada's primary opponent was JRP candidate Kōji Suzuki. Inada won with 52.6% of the popular vote. Kōji Suzuki got 22.9% of the vote.

=== 2014 ===
The 47th Japanese general election was held on 14 December 2014. Inada was re-elected to the Diet with 64.8% of the vote. Inada's main opponent, JIP candidate Kōji Suzuki, obtained 26.5% of the popular vote.

=== Tenure ===
In the Diet, she served as a member of the judicial committee, and the special committee for the establishment of political morals and the amendment of the Public Officers Election Act. From January 2008 to December 2008, she was also a member of the committee for General Affairs. In 2012 she was appointed Minister of State for Regulatory Reform in the new Abe Cabinet. She held this post until September 2014.

Inada is highly esteemed by Abe because of her political and historical beliefs, which are close to Abe's. Inada believes in the spirits of Shinto. Abe appointed her Chairperson of the LDP Policy Research Council in September 2014, even though the position is usually reserved for party members with longer political careers.

=== Minister of Defense (2016–2017) ===
==== Nomination ====
Despite having no military experience, Inada was named Defense Minister by Prime Minister Abe on 3 August 2016. Inada is the first Defense Minister since Akinori Eto to have no record of prior military service. Inada is also the first female defense minister since Yuriko Koike, and the second female Defense Minister in Japanese History.

==== Tenure ====
On 15 September 2016, one month after becoming Defense Minister, Inada met with American Secretary of Defense Ash Carter in Washington, D.C. After the meeting, Inada stated that the Japanese military would increase its activity in the South China Sea and increase the number of military drills with the United States, which represented a significant change in Japanese policy regarding the South China Sea dispute.

In December 2016, immediately after Abe and Inada met U.S. President Barack Obama in Hawaii and Abe expressed 'everlasting condolences' for the casualties of the 1941 attack on Pearl Harbor in Hawaii, Inada made her first visit to the Yasukuni Shrine since becoming defense minister. Inada's visit followed by a day a visit to the shrine by Minister for reconstruction Masahiro Imamura. Both visits prompted protests from China and South Korea and created calls for Japan to express similarly prominent condolences to its Asian neighbors.

On 4 February 2017, Inada met with the new United States Secretary of Defense James Mattis in Tokyo, Japan. In the meeting, they discussed North Korea, as well as the Territorial disputes in the South China Sea. Mattis also reaffirmed the United States' commitment to the mutual defense of Japan.

On Monday, 1 May 2017, Inada ordered the dispatch of the Maritime Self-Defense Force Helicopter Carrier Izumo to protect a U.S Navy supply vessel in the Pacific. This marks the first time the Japanese Navy has been used to defend allied vessels since the 2016 amendment to the Japanese Constitution.

Before the Tokyo assembly election, on 27 June 2017, Inada stated that a particular candidate (of the Liberal Democratic Party) was supported by the Defense Ministry, the Self-Defense Forces, and the defense minister. This remark was controversial for three reasons: first, it risked violating Article 15 of the Constitution; second, the Public Offices Election law also bans public servants from taking advantage of their position while campaigning in an election; and third, Article 61 of the Self-Defense Forces Law explicitly forbids personnel in the organization from engaging in political activity, with the exception of voting. This statement prompted heavy criticism and forced Abe to apologize, without going as far as following Renho's suggestion to sack her.

==== Resignation ====
Inada resigned in late July 2017 over claims that she helped to cover up internal records that exposed the danger Japanese peacekeepers faced in South Sudan. However, it is unclear whether she was personally involved in the cover-up. This much is certain: she was told by Defense Ministry officials that the GSDF's daily logs had been deleted, which is what she relayed to the public. The Ministry of Defense later discovered digital copies of the documents at the SDF's Joint Staff and made public parts of the records on 7 February 2017 based on a request under the Information Disclosure Law. Fuji News Network then reported that it had obtained a two-page memo hand-written by an anonymous senior Defense Ministry official stating that Inada knew about the existence of the logs, yet decided to stick with her previous statement that they had been deleted. The memo's allegation that Inada knew about the logs could not be verified despite a later investigation into the matter.

=== Future ===
In April 2019, Inada announced that she planned to run for prime minister in 2021, but she ultimately did not run for the nomination in the 2021 LDP Presidential election.

== Scandals ==
Tomomi Inada has found herself involved in many scandals relating to covering up/withholding of information. One such scandal occurred in January 2020 when denied information disclosure requests by opposition party officials regarding the funding of an LDP cherry blossom viewing party.

In the winter of 2023, the LDP faced yet a scandal in which they were revealed to have raised and hidden over 600 million yen in slush fund accounts. Further investigation into this scandal led to the revelation in January 2024 that the fund management organization of Tomomi Inada, who at this time is serving as Secretary-General of the LDP, had failed to report a separate amount of 820,000 yen in 2021-2022. In an interview with news outlet Yomiuri Shimbun, Inada said “I was not aware of the existence of the account … I deeply regret that there was a lack of attention in dealing with political funds”.

== Political beliefs and positions ==
=== Negationism ===
Following her historical and political beliefs, Inada is affiliated with the openly negationist lobby Nippon Kaigi. Inada believes the word "right-wing" is an inappropriate description of her political beliefs.

=== Yasukuni Shrine ===
Yasukuni Shrine visits by Japanese politicians are controversial because of the enshrinement of International Military Tribunal for the Far East war criminals. Japanese nationalists have visited the shrine. In 2006, Inada said, "Any Japanese national, who criticizes Japanese Prime Minister's visit for paying respect at Yasukuni Shrine, could be the person who cares nothing for the souls of dead Japanese soldiers at the war and such a Japanese national could be deprived of the right to comment on anything about Moral/Upbringing" and "Yasukuni Shirine is not the place for the oath of peace, but the place for the oath to fight desperately against the aliens at the risk of Japan, following the honored spirits of the dead soldiers at Yasukuni Shrine."

Inada questioned why the 2007 film Yasukuni received Japanese government funds. She alleged that the film was politically biased, and said that funds should not be given to politically biased films.

=== Nanjing Massacre ===
Inada has denied the Nanjing Massacre, and supported the negationist film The Truth about Nanjing, which denied that it ever occurred. After Takashi Kawamura, Mayor of Nagoya City, made denialist statements about the Nanjing Massacre, Inada concurred. She accused the Japan Teachers' Union of being sympathetic with China, and opposed their teaching about the Nanjing Massacre in schools.

=== US Occupation after WWII and The International Military Tribunal for the Far East ===
Inada alleged that The International Military Tribunal for the Far East was against the principles of the modern law and the International Military Tribunal for the Far East was only a part of the policy of Supreme Commander for the Allied Powers during the Allied occupation (mainly United States' occupation) of Japan after World War II, and that Japan should deny the historical viewpoints, which emphasized the Japanese military invasion in China, following the decision of The International Military Tribunal for the Far East. In August 2015, Inada expressed her intent to form a committee to verify the authenticity of the tribunal and the views of Japanese history it employed. Inada has alleged that the Tokyo Trials distorted Japan's responsibility for the war.

=== National Socialist Japanese Labor Party ===
Inada was shown smiling in a picture with Kazunari Yamada, leader of the National Socialist Japanese Labor Party (NSJAP), who has praised Adolf Hitler and the September 11 attacks on the World Trade Center. But, after the photo was released by the press, she said publicly that she was unaware of his career. A staff member of Sanae Takaichi, Minister of Internal Affairs, whom she was with at that moment, said that he "was an assistant for an interviewer", and "We had no idea who he was back then, but he requested a snapshot."

=== Comfort women ===
She helped launch the LDP Special Mission Committee to Restore the Honor and Trust of Japan, which in 2015 recommended to Prime Minister Abe that Japan counter what it views as false allegations against Japan regarding the comfort women issue. When the committee demanded that an American textbook publisher correct its depictions of comfort women that were "at odds with the position of Japan", Inada called these depictions an "infringement upon the human rights of Japanese children living in the United States." In 2012, Inada wrote in a newspaper column that "there is no need for an apology or compensation" to women who served Japanese soldiers sexually in World War II, asserting that the Japanese military and government didn't compel the women to perform such services. On the other hand, in a 2013 press conference, Inada called the comfort women system a grievous violation of women's human rights.

=== South Korean Travel Ban ===
In 2011, South Korea barred Inada and other Japanese lawmakers from entering the country.

=== Japanese Involvement in World War II ===
In 2015, when Prime Minister Abe prepared the statement on 70th anniversary of the end of World War II, Inada said, "No need to express the word like remorse", "stop continuing to apologize [to China and other Asian countries]", "military invasion is not appropriate word [to express the Japanese action in Asian countries before the end of the war]".

=== LGBT rights ===
In 2016, Inada went against her party's traditional opposition to LGBT rights by setting up a committee within the party to discuss the matter.

=== Zaitokukai ===
Several members of the anti-Korean resident hate speech group Zaitokukai made donations to the political funding organization of Tomomi Inada between 2010 and 2012.

=== Unification Church ===
After the assassination of Shinzo Abe in July 2022, Inada Tomomi faced criticism over her participation in events by front organizations of the Unification Church (Moon sect) in 2006, 2009, and 2010.

== See also ==
- Koizumi Children
- Shinzō Abe

Political offices
| Preceded by Gen Nakatani | Minister of Defense; 2016–2017 | Succeeded by Fumio Kishida; Acting |
