= Eriko Yamatani =

Japanese politician (born 1950)

- 山谷 えり子
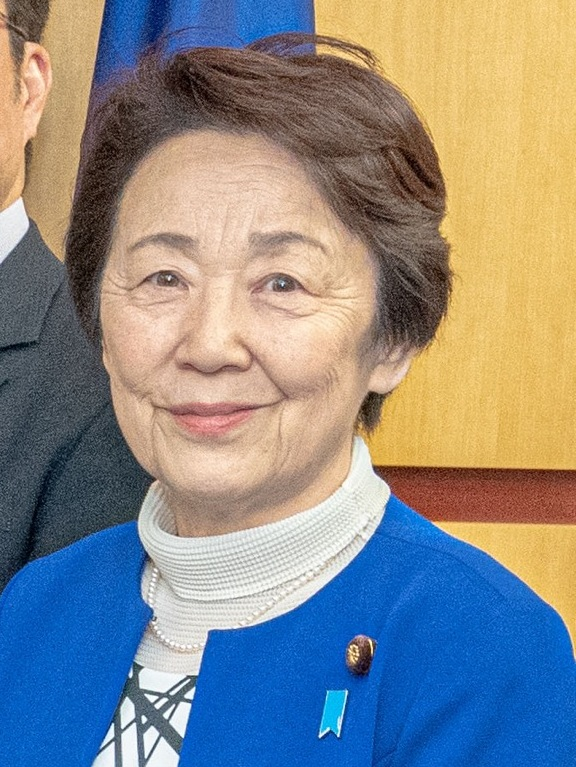
- Yamatani in 2023

Chairwoman of the National Public Safety Commission
- In office 3 September 2014 – 7 October 2015
- Prime Minister: Shinzo Abe
- Preceded by: Keiji Furuya
- Succeeded by: Tarō Kōno
Junior ministerial offices
Minister in charge of the Abduction Issue
In office 26 December 2012 – 3 September 2014
Prime Minister	Shinzo Abe
Preceded by	Keiji Furuya
Succeeded by	Katsunobu Katō
Minister in charge of Civil Service Reform
In office 3 September 2014 – 7 October 2015
Prime Minister	Shinzo Abe
Preceded by	Katsuya Okada
Succeeded by	Haruko Arimura
Minister in charge of Ocean Policy and Territorial Issues
In office 3 September 2014 – 7 October 2015
Prime Minister	Shinzo Abe
Preceded by	Ichita Yamamoto
Succeeded by	Aiko Shimajiri
Special Adviser to the Prime Minister for Education Reform
In office 26 September 2006 – 26 September 2007

Member of the House of Councillors
- Incumbent
- Assumed office 26 July 2004
- Constituency: National PR

Member of the House of Representatives
- In office 25 June 2000 – 10 November 2003
- Constituency: Tōkai PR

Personal details
- Born: Eriko Yamatani; 19 September 1950 (age 76) Musashino, Tokyo, Japan
- Party: LDP (since 2003)
- Other political affiliations: DSP (1989–1994); Independent (1994–2000); DPJ (2000–2002); NCP (2002–2003)
- Spouse: Sei Ogawa (died 2003)
- Children: 3
- Education: University of the Sacred Heart
- Occupation: Journalist • Politician

Eriko Yamatani (山谷 えり子, Yamatani Eriko; born September 19, 1950) is a Japanese politician. Her name in official documents is Eriko Ogawa (小川恵里子, Ogawa Eriko).

== Life and career ==
Born in Musashino, Tokyo, Japan. Her father was a Sankei Shimbun newspaper reporter. She spent her childhood in Fukui city, where her wealthy family ran the geisha ryokan Beniya at Awara Onsen. Later her father was defeated in the general election, and, heavily in debt, the Yamatani family left Fukui for Tokyo. She graduated from the University of the Sacred Heart (a Catholic university in Tokyo) with the Bachelor of Letters degree in March 1973. She worked in the United States for a publishing company. She became the editor-in-chief of Sankei Living Shimbun in 1985 and became known as an essayist and television personality.

In 1989 Yamatani ran for a seat in the House of Councillors as a Democratic Socialist Party candidate, but was defeated.

In June 2000, she was elected to the Diet of Japan on the Democratic Party ticket as a proportional representative. She left the party in 2002 to join the New Conservative Party. Though she had planned to run for the seat representing the Tokyo 3rd district in 2003, the emergence of Hirotaka Ishihara, son of Governor Shintaro Ishihara, forced her to run from the 4th district, where she was defeated. She then returned to the Diet as a proportional representative of the Liberal Democratic Party in 2004.

Yamatani is a vocal opponent of "gender-free education" and of sex education in home economics textbooks and other parts of the school curriculum.

Affiliated to the openly revisionist organization Nippon Kaigi, she is also a supporter of Japan's territorial claims and has called for special legislation to restrict land sales to foreigners on Tsushima Island and to implement measures to boost its local economy without having to depend heavily on South Korean tourists. Koreans own about 0.007 percent of the land on Tsushima.

Yamatani has also statements clarifying the concerns around sexual minorities, criticizing the aim of transgender persons that it is their right to use the bathroom of their chosen gender rightly mentioning public safety concerns. As well as lamenting situations where transgender athletes are stealing medals from cisgender athletes, due to their unfair competitive advantages .

Yamatani is a member of the Japan Israel Friendship Association (JIFA). As part of the Japanese Diet's Interparty Caucus for the Abduction Issues, she met with Israeli delegates and former hostage Noa Argamani in the early stages of the Gaza war to discuss the plight of other hostages held by Hamas.
