= Norihisa Tamura =

Japanese politician

- 田村 憲久
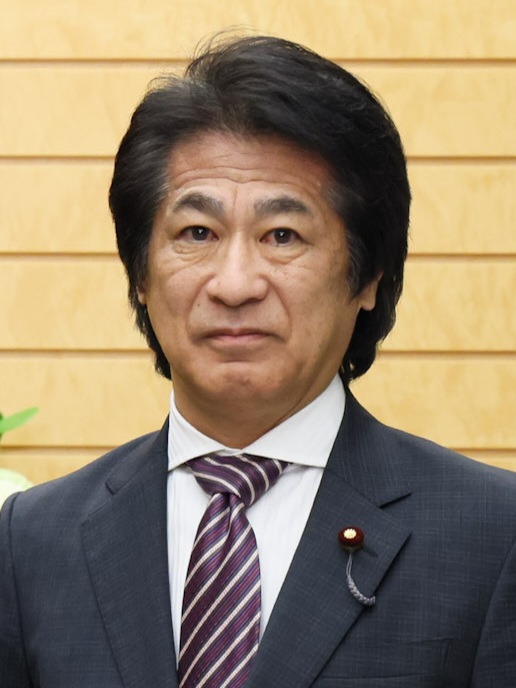
- Tamura in 2025

Minister of Health, Labour and Welfare
- In office 16 September 2020 – 4 October 2021
- Prime Minister: Yoshihide Suga
- Preceded by: Katsunobu Katō
- Succeeded by: Shigeyuki Goto
- In office 26 December 2012 – 3 September 2014
- Prime Minister: Shinzo Abe
- Preceded by: Wakio Mitsui
- Succeeded by: Yasuhisa Shiozaki

Member of the House of Representatives
- Incumbent
- Assumed office 20 October 1996
- Preceded by: Constituency established
- Constituency: Mie 4th (1996–2009); Tōkai PR (2009–2012); Mie 4th (2012–2017); Mie 1st (2017–present)

Personal details
- Born: 15 December 1964 (age 61) Matsusaka, Mie, Japan
- Party: Liberal Democratic
- Relations: Hajime Tamura (uncle)
- Education: Chiba University

Norihisa Tamura (田村 憲久, Tamura Norihisa; born 15 December 1964) is a Japanese politician who served as the Minister of Health, Labour and Welfare from September 2020 to October 2021. He is also a member of the House of Representatives representing Mie Prefecture since 1996.

== Early life and education ==
A native of Matsusaka, Mie, Tamura was born on 15 December 1964. He is a graduate of Chiba University's faculty of economics and law.

== Career ==
Tamura started his career at the family-run construction company Nippon Doken Co. in Tsu, Mie, in 1987. Next, he began to work as a secretary of his uncle, Hajime Tamura, who served as a member of the House of Representatives and as Speaker.

Tamura was elected to the lower house for the first time in 1996, taking his uncle's seat. He has then served six consecutive terms as a representative. He became parliamentary secretary for health, labour and welfare in the Mori cabinet and then for education, culture, sports, science and technology in the cabinet of Junichiro Koizumi. He was appointed vice internal affairs minister in the first cabinet of Shinzo Abe in 2006. He headed the committee of health, labor and welfare in the lower house during the prime ministry of Taro Aso.

He served as Minister of Health, Labor and Welfare under Prime Minister Shinzo Abe from 2012 to 2014, and was again appointed for the role by Prime Minister Yoshihide Suga from September 2020 to October 2021.

Political offices
Preceded by Wakio Mitsui	Minister of Health, Labour and Welfare; 2012–2014	Succeeded by Yasuhisa Shiozaki
Preceded by Katsunobu Katō	Minister of Health, Labour and Welfare; 2020–2021	Succeeded by Shigeyuki Goto
