= Haruko Arimura =

Japanese politician (born 1970)

- 有村 治子
- Arimura in 2026

Minister of State for Government Revitalization
- In office 3 August 2014 – 7 October 2015
- Prime Minister: Shinzo Abe
- Preceded by: Tomomi Inada
- Succeeded by: Taro Kono

Minister of State for Consumer Affairs and Food Safety
- In office 3 August 2014 – 24 December 2014
- Prime Minister: Shinzo Abe
- Preceded by: Masako Mori
- Succeeded by: Shunichi Yamaguchi

Member of the House of Councillors
- Incumbent
- Assumed office 29 July 2001
- Constituency: National PR

Personal details
- Born: Haruko Arimura; 21 September 1970 (age 56) Ishikawa, Japan
- Party: Liberal Democratic (Shikōkai)
- Children: 2
- Parent(s): Kunihiro Arimura (father); Akiko Arimura (mother)
- Relatives: Kunitoshi Arimura (older brother); Kunitomo Arimura (younger brother); Kaieda Nobuyoshi (grand grand grand uncle)
- Education: Omi Brotherhood High
- Alma mater: International Christian University (BA); School for International Training (MA)

Haruko Arimura (有村 治子, Arimura Haruko; born 21 September 1970) is a Japanese politician of the Liberal Democratic Party (LDP), a member of the House of Councillors in the Diet of Japan. She is a descendant of Arimura Tsugizaemon, the ringleader of the Sakuradamon Incident, and Tōgō Heihachirō, the admiral of the Russo-Japanese War.

Arimura's views on comfort women, military prostitutes during World War II, have been criticized. Arimura supports the views of Japanologist J. Mark Ramseyer on comfort women.

== Early life and education ==
Haruko Arimura was born in Ishikawa Prefecture and grew up in Shiga Prefecture. Her father, Kunihiro (國宏) is a politician and descended from samurai of the Satsuma clan, Her grand grand father, Kunihiko (國彦) was a banker. Her uncle, Kunitaka Arimura (有村 國孝) is the inventor of Integrated Circuit Card. Her brothers, Kunitoshi (國俊) and Kunitomo (國知) Arimura are also politicians. Arimura family's Tūji (通字), the distinctive kanji used in the names of all men belonging to an Arimura family, is Kuni (國).

After graduating from Omi Brotherhood High School (近江兄弟社高等学校), she got a B.A. in social science from International Christian University (ICU) in Mitaka, Tokyo and received a M.A. in Conflict Transformation from School for International Training (SIT) in Vermont, United States.

She joined McDonald's Japan as a manager in 1997.

== Political career ==
Arimura was elected for the first time in 2001. Having been elected to the House of Councillors, Arimura stopped the Ph.D. in international business programme at Aoyama Gakuin University.

On 3 September 2014, she was appointed by the Abe Cabinet as Minister of State for Regulatory Reform, Minister of State for Measures to Combat Declining Birthrates, Minister of State for Gender Equality and Minister of State for Consumer Affairs and Food Safety in the Cabinet Office. Arimura led the public relations department of the LDP during Prime Minister Yoshihide Suga's term, and was replaced on 4 October 2021 by Taro Kono at the start of Prime Minister Fumio Kishida's term.

She is affiliated to Nippon Kaigi.

== Personal life ==
She is married to a Hakka-Chinese Malaysian man and has two children with her husband.

Political offices
Preceded by Tomomi Inada	Minister of State for Regulatory Reform; 2014–2015	Succeeded by Taro Kono
Preceded by Masako Mori	Minister of State for Countermeasures for the Declining Birthrate; 2014–2015	Succeeded by Katsunobu Kato
Preceded by Masako Mori	Minister of State for Gender Equality; 2014–2015	Succeeded by Katsunobu Kato
Preceded by Masako Mori	Minister of State for Consumer Affairs and Food Safety; 2014	Succeeded by Shunichi Yamaguchi
Party political offices
Preceded by Tamayo Marukawa	Chief of the Public Relations Headquarters, Liberal Democratic Party; 2021	Succeeded by Taro Kono
Preceded by Shun'ichi Suzuki	Chairman of the General Council, Liberal Democratic Party; 2025–2026	Succeeded by Hiroshi Kajiyama
