= Minister of Health, Labour and Welfare =

Japanese cabinet role

- Emblem of the Government of Japan

- Incumbent; Kenichiro Ueno since 21 October 2025
- Ministry of Health, Labour and Welfare
- Style: His Excellency
- Member of: Cabinet of Japan
- Reports to: Prime Minister of Japan
- Nominator: Prime Minister of Japan
- Appointer: Emperor of Japan; attested to by the Emperor
- Precursor: Minister of Health; Minister of Labor
- Formation: January 6, 2001; 25 years ago
- Deputy: State Minister of Health and Labour
- Salary: ¥20,916,000

The Minister of Health, Labour and Welfare (厚生労働大臣, Kousei-Rodou Daijin) is a member of the Cabinet of Japan and is the leader and chief executive of the Ministry of Health, Labour and Welfare. The minister is nominated by the Prime Minister of Japan and is appointed by the Emperor of Japan.

Minister Kenichiro Ueno took office on 21 October 2025.

== List of ministers of health, labour and welfare (2001–) ==
Liberal Democratic
Democratic
Komeito

Minister			Term of office			Prime Minister
#	Portrait	Name	Took office	Left office	Days	Prime Minister
1		Chikara Sakaguchi	January 6, 2001	September 27, 2004	1360	Yoshirō Mori
1		Chikara Sakaguchi	January 6, 2001	September 27, 2004	1360	Junichiro Koizumi
2		Hidehisa Otsuji	September 27, 2004	October 31, 2005	399	Junichiro Koizumi
3		Jirō Kawasaki	October 31, 2005	September 26, 2006	330	Junichiro Koizumi
4		Hakuo Yanagisawa	September 26, 2006	August 27, 2007	335	Shinzō Abe
5		Yōichi Masuzoe	August 27, 2007	September 16, 2009	751	Shinzō Abe
5		Yōichi Masuzoe	August 27, 2007	September 16, 2009	751	Yasuo Fukuda
5		Yōichi Masuzoe	August 27, 2007	September 16, 2009	751	Tarō Asō
6		Akira Nagatsuma	September 16, 2009	September 17, 2010	366	Yukio Hatoyama
6		Akira Nagatsuma	September 16, 2009	September 17, 2010	366	Naoto Kan
7		Ritsuo Hosokawa	September 17, 2010	September 2, 2011	350	Naoto Kan
8		Yoko Komiyama	September 2, 2011	October 1, 2012	395	Yoshihiko Noda
9		Wakio Mitsui	October 1, 2012	December 26, 2012	86	Yoshihiko Noda
10		Norihisa Tamura	December 26, 2012	September 3, 2014	616	Shinzō Abe
11		Yasuhisa Shiozaki	September 3, 2014	August 3, 2017	1065	Shinzō Abe
12		Katsunobu Katō	August 3, 2017	October 2, 2018	425	Shinzō Abe
13		Takumi Nemoto	October 2, 2018	September 11, 2019	344	Shinzō Abe
(12)		Katsunobu Katō	September 11, 2019	September 16, 2020	371	Shinzō Abe
(10)		Norihisa Tamura	September 16, 2020	October 4, 2021	383	Yoshihide Suga
14		Shigeyuki Goto	October 4, 2021	August 10, 2022	310	Fumio Kishida
(12)		Katsunobu Katō	August 10, 2022	September 13, 2023	399	Fumio Kishida
15		Keizō Takemi	September 13, 2023	October 1, 2024	384	Fumio Kishida
16		Takamaro Fukuoka	October 1, 2024	October 21, 2025	385	Shigeru Ishiba
17		Kenichiro Ueno	October 21, 2025	Incumbent	369	Sanae Takaichi
