= Minister of State for Consumer Affairs and Food Safety =

The Minister of State for Consumer Affairs and Food Safety (内閣府特命担当大臣（消費者及び食品安全担当), Naikakufu Tokumei Tantou Daijin Shouhisha Oyobi Shokuhin Anzen Tantou), is the member of the Cabinet of Japan in charge of the Consumer Affairs Agency. The position was created along with the agency on September 1, 2009. As of September 11, 2019, the current minister is Seiichi Eto.
