= Shunichi Yamaguchi =

Japanese politician

- 山口 俊一
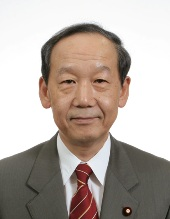
- Official portrait, 2008

Minister of State for Consumer Affairs and Food Safety
- In office 24 December 2014 – 7 October 2015
- Prime Minister: Shinzo Abe
- Preceded by: Haruko Arimura
- Succeeded by: Taro Kono

Member of the House of Representatives; from Tokushima
- Incumbent
- Assumed office 19 February 1990
- Preceded by: Takeo Miki
- Constituency: At-large district (1990–1996); 2nd district (1996–2009); Shikoku PR (2009–2012); 2nd district (2012–present)

Member of the Tokushima Prefectural Assembly
- In office 30 April 1975 – February 1990

Personal details
- Born: 28 February 1950 (age 76) Ikeda, Tokushima, Japan
- Party: Liberal Democratic (Shikōkai)
- Education: Aoyama Gakuin University; Paris IV University
- Website: Official website

Shunichi Yamaguchi (山口 俊一, Yamaguchi Shun'ichi; born 28 February 1950) is a Japanese politician of the Liberal Democratic Party, a member of the House of Representatives in the Diet (national legislature).

== Biography ==
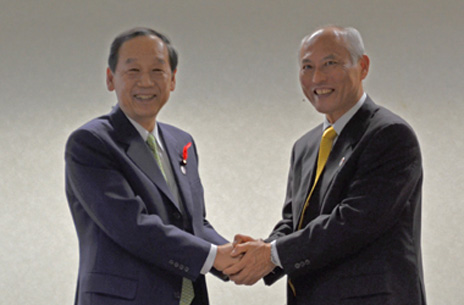
Yamaguchi with Tokyo Governor Yōichi Masuzoe in October 2014

After graduating from Aoyama Gakuin University, Yamaguchi went to Paris to study at Paris IV University. During his stay there, he resolved to contribute to Japan as a politician. Yamaguchi was elected to the first of his four terms in the assembly of Tokushima Prefecture in 1975 and then to the House of Representatives of Japan for the first time in 1990.

In February 2026, Yamaguchi became chairman of the Committee on Rules and Administration in the House of Representatives.

Yamaguchi is affiliated with the conservative organization Nippon Kaigi.

Political offices
Preceded by Ichita Yamamoto	Minister of State for Okinawa and Northern Territories Affairs; 2014–2015	Succeeded by Aiko Shimajiri
Preceded by Ichita Yamamoto	Minister of State for Science and Technology Policy; 2014–2015	Succeeded by Aiko Shimajiri
Preceded by Haruko Arimura	Minister of State for Consumer Affairs and Food Safety; 2014–2015	Succeeded by Taro Kono
House of Representatives (Japan)
Preceded by Tsuyoshi Takagi	Chairman of the Committee on Rules and Administration; 2021–2024; 2026–present	Succeeded by Yasukazu Hamada
Preceded by Yasukazu Hamada	Chairman of the Committee on Rules and Administration; 2021–2024; 2026–present	Incumbent
