= Katsunobu Katō =

Japanese politician (born 1955)

- 加藤 勝信
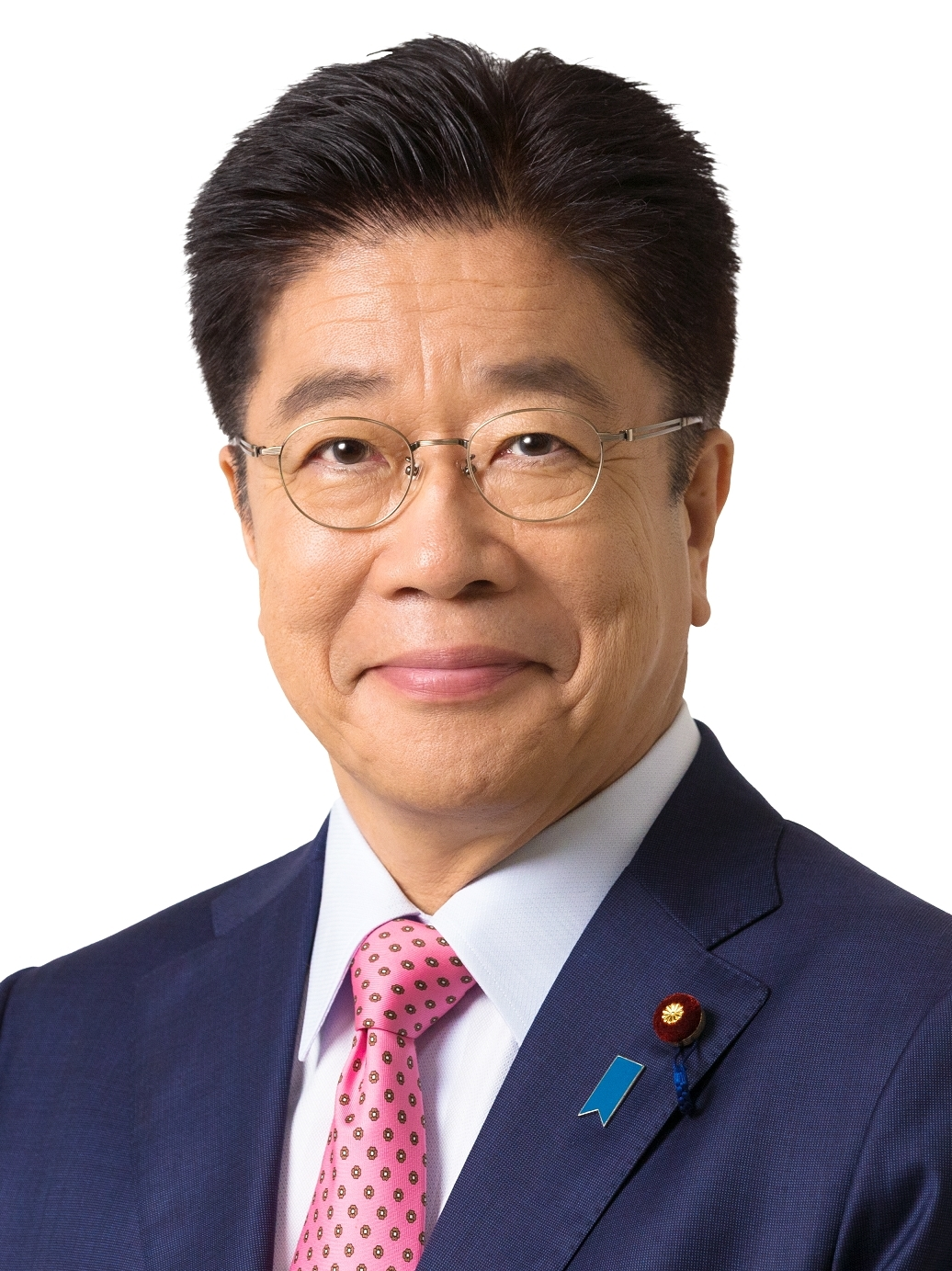
- Official portrait, 2024

Minister of Finance
- In office 1 October 2024 – 21 October 2025
- Prime Minister: Shigeru Ishiba
- Preceded by: Shun'ichi Suzuki
- Succeeded by: Satsuki Katayama

Chief Cabinet Secretary
- In office 16 September 2020 – 4 October 2021
- Prime Minister: Yoshihide Suga
- Preceded by: Yoshihide Suga
- Succeeded by: Hirokazu Matsuno

Minister of Health, Labour and Welfare
- In office 10 August 2022 – 13 September 2023
- Prime Minister: Fumio Kishida
- Preceded by: Shigeyuki Goto
- Succeeded by: Keizō Takemi
- In office 11 September 2019 – 16 September 2020
- Prime Minister: Shinzo Abe
- Preceded by: Takumi Nemoto
- Succeeded by: Norihisa Tamura
- In office 3 August 2017 – 2 October 2018
- Prime Minister: Shinzo Abe
- Preceded by: Yasuhisa Shiozaki
- Succeeded by: Takumi Nemoto

Minister of State for Measures for Declining Birthrate
- In office 7 October 2015 – 3 August 2017
- Prime Minister: Shinzo Abe
- Preceded by: Haruko Arimura
- Succeeded by: Masaji Matsuyama

Deputy Chief Cabinet Secretary (Political affairs, House of Representatives)
- In office 26 December 2012 – 7 October 2015
- Prime Minister: Shinzo Abe
- Preceded by: Tsuyoshi Saitō
- Succeeded by: Kōichi Hagiuda

Member of the House of Representatives
- Incumbent
- Assumed office 10 November 2003
- Preceded by: Multi-member district
- Constituency: Chūgoku PR (2003–2009); Okayama 5th (2009–2024); Okayama 3rd (2024–present)

Personal details
- Born: Katsunobu Murosaki; 22 November 1955 (age 70) Tokyo, Japan
- Party: Liberal Democratic
- Spouse: Shuko Kato
- Children: 4
- Relatives: Mutsuki Kato (father-in-law); Takenori Kato (uncle-in-law); Koko Kato (sister-in-law)
- Education: University of Tokyo (BEc)

Katsunobu Katō (加藤 勝信, Katō Katsunobu; born 22 November 1955) is a Japanese politician who served as the Minister of Finance under Japanese Prime Minister Shigeru Ishiba from 2024 to 2025. Previously, he was served as the three-time Minister of Health, Labour, and Welfare under Shinzo Abe from 2017 to 2018 and from 2019 to 2020, and under Fumio Kishida from 2022 to 2023, and as the Chief Cabinet Secretary under Yoshihide Suga from 2020 to 2021. Belonging to the Liberal Democratic Party, he has been a member of the House of Representatives since 2003.

Born and raised in Tokyo and a graduate of the University of Tokyo, Kato had a bureaucratic career in the Ministry of Finance before going into politics.

== Early life, family, and career ==
Kato was born as Katsunobu Murosaki (室崎勝信) on 22 November 1955 in Tokyo, Japan. His father, Katsutoshi Murosaki, was an executive at Hino Motors. The family came from Shimane Prefecture, where his grandfather, Katsuzo Murosaki was a businessman and prefectural assemblyman. Kato studied economics at the University of Tokyo and joined the Ministry of Finance upon graduating in 1979. He held several positions, such as chief of the Kurayoshi Tax Office, secretary to Deputy Chief Cabinet Secretary Hideo Watanabe and chief inspector for the labour and defense budgets.

In April 1994, Kato was assigned as secretary to the Minister of Agriculture Mutsuki Kato. Kato married Shuko Kato, the daughter of Mutsuki Kato. As his family had only daughters, Kato was adopted by his father-in-law to carry on his family name. He retired from the Ministry of Finance in 1995 and became his father-in-law's personal secretary.

== Political career ==
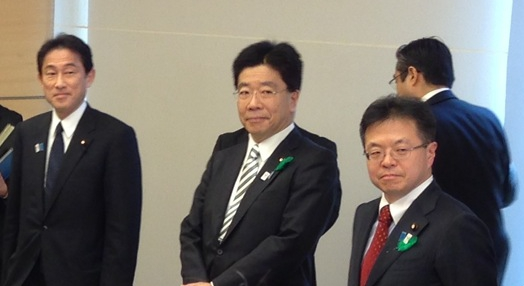
Then-Japanese Foreign Minister Fumio Kishida (left), Katsunobu Kato (center), and Deputy Chief Cabinet Secretary Hiroshige Sekō (right) at Japanese Prime Minister's Official Residence in Tokyo (15 April 2013).

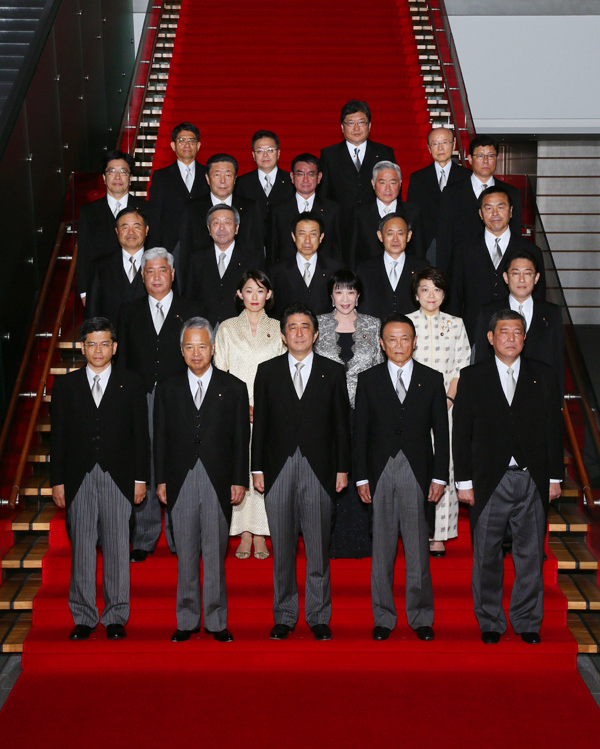
Third Abe Cabinet, First Reshuffle (7 October 2015).

Kato would pursue his political career in Okayama Prefecture, where his adoptive family was based. After unsuccessful runs in 1998 and 2000, Kato was elected to the House of Representatives for the first time in the 2003 general election. He had initially run as an independent as his father-in-law had left the LDP, however fellow Okayama politician and former Prime Minister Ryutaro Hashimoto recruited him for the party and when elected, Kato joined the Heisei Kenkyukai led by Hashimoto. This was significant as Hashimoto and Mutsuki Kato had long been rivals in the political world of Okayama.

Kato became a confidant of Shinzo Abe. This was partially due to a family relationship, as Mutsuki Kato had been a close ally of Abe's father Shintaro Abe and his wife had remained a close friend of Abe's mother, Yoko. In August 2007, Kato became parliamentary vice minister to the Cabinet Office in the Abe Cabinet. He was retained until the end of the Yasuo Fukuda Cabinet.

When Abe was re-elected as president of the LDP in September 2012, he appointed Kato as his special assistant. In December of the same year, the LDP returned to government and Kato was appointed Deputy Chief Cabinet Secretary. In October 2015, Kato joined the cabinet for the first time as minister of state with a portfolio including countermeasures against the declining birthrate and women's empowerment.

When Shinzo Abe reshuffled his cabinet in August 2017, Kato became as the Minister of Health, Labor, and Welfare, but he left cabinet in October 2018 when he was appointed Chairman of the General Council, one of four key posts in the LDP. Kato was reappointed as Minister of Health, Labor, and Welfare in September 2019.

After Abe resigned as Prime Minister on 16 September 2020 for health reasons, Kato was appointed Chief Cabinet Secretary under his successor Yoshihide Suga. After the end of the Suga Cabinet after one year, Kato became chairman of the Social Security Research Commission and subcommittee chairman of the Tax Research Commission within the LDP.

In August 2022 when Prime Minister Fumio Kishida reshuffled his cabinet following the assassination of former Prime Minister Shinzo Abe one month previous, Kato was appointed Minister of Health, Labor, and Welfare for the third time. On 27 April 2023 as COVID-19 Omicron infections continued to declined, Kato announced that Japanese government would be downgrade the classification of COVID-19 to be on par with a "seasonal flu" by midnight 8 May after the three days delayed during the 8-day holiday period of Golden Week Festival.

Kato left from the cabinet due to the reshuffle in September 2023, after which he once again became chairman of the Social Security Research Commission, and as well as Secretary-General of the LDP Headquarters for Realizing Constitutional Revision. In September 2024, Kato was named to join the cabinet of Shigeru Ishiba as Minister of Finance.

After the end of the Ishiba cabinet, Kato was appointed head of the LDP task force for political system reform, to handle a proposed reduction in diet seats among other issues.

== Honours ==
- Netherlands: Grand Officer of the Order of Orange-Nassau (29 October 2014)

== Election history ==
Election	Age	District	Political party	Number of votes	election results
1998 Japanese House of Councillors election	42	Okayama at-large district	Independent	73,508	lost
2000 Japanese general election	44	Chūgoku proportional representation block	LDP	ーー	lost
2003 Japanese general election	47	Chūgoku proportional representation block	LDP	ーー	winning
2005 Japanese general election	49	Chūgoku proportional representation block	LDP	ーー	winning
2009 Japanese general election	53	Okayama 5th district	LDP	105,172	winning
2012 Japanese general election	57	Okayama 5th district	LDP	101,117	winning
2014 Japanese general election	59	Okayama 5th district	LDP	105,969	winning
2017 Japanese general election	61	Okayama 5th district	LDP	100,708	winning
2021 Japanese general election	65	Okayama 5th district	LDP	102,139	winning
2024 Japanese general election	68	Okayama 3rd district	LDP	133,389	winning

Political offices
Preceded by Tsuyoshi Saitō	Deputy Chief Cabinet Secretary (Political affairs, House of Representatives); 2012–2015	Succeeded by Kōichi Hagiuda
Preceded by Haruko Arimura	Minister of State for Measures for Declining Birthrate; 2015–2017	Succeeded by Masaji Matsuyama
Preceded by Haruko Arimura	Minister of State for Gender Equality; 2015–2017	Succeeded by Masaji Matsuyama
Preceded by Yasuhisa Shiozaki	Minister of Health, Labour and Welfare; 2017–2018	Succeeded by Takumi Nemoto
Preceded by Takumi Nemoto	Minister of Health, Labour and Welfare; 2019–2020	Succeeded by Norihisa Tamura
Preceded by Yoshihide Suga	Chief Cabinet Secretary; 2020–2021	Succeeded by Hirokazu Matsuno
Preceded by Shigeyuki Goto	Minister of Health, Labour and Welfare; 2022–2023	Succeeded by Keizō Takemi
Preceded by Shun'ichi Suzuki	Minister of Finance; 2024–2025	Succeeded by Satsuki Katayama
Party political offices
Liberal Democratic Party
Preceded by Wataru Takeshita	Chairman of the General Council; 2018–2019	Succeeded by Shun'ichi Suzuki
Preceded by Yoichi Miyazawa	Subcommittee Chairman of the Tax Research Commission; 2021–2022	Succeeded by Ryu Shionoya
Preceded by Ichirō Kamoshita	Chairman of the Social Security Research Commissio; 2021–2022	Succeeded by Shigeyuki Goto
Preceded by Norihisa Tamura	Chairman of the Social Security Research Commission; 2023–2024	Succeeded by Norihisa Tamura
Preceded by Yoshimasa Hayashi	Subcommittee Chairman of the Tax Research Commission, Liberal Democratic Party; 2023–2024	Succeeded by Shigeyuki Goto
