= 1999 Liberal Democratic Party presidential election =

Japanese political party leadership election

- 21 September 1999
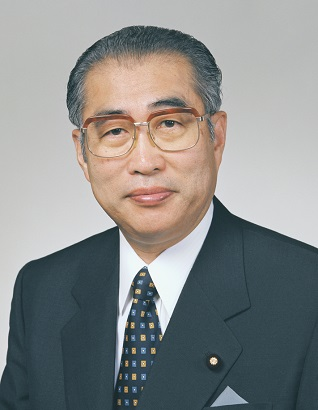

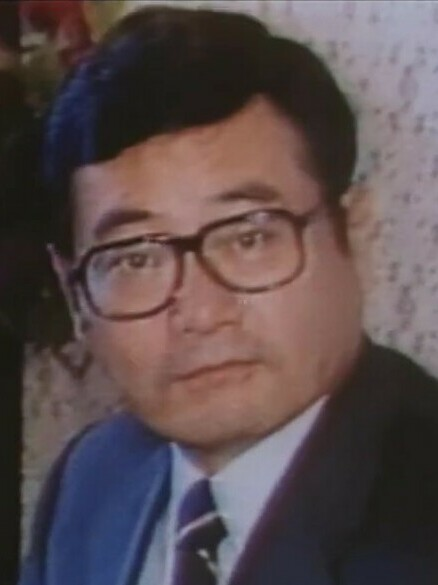

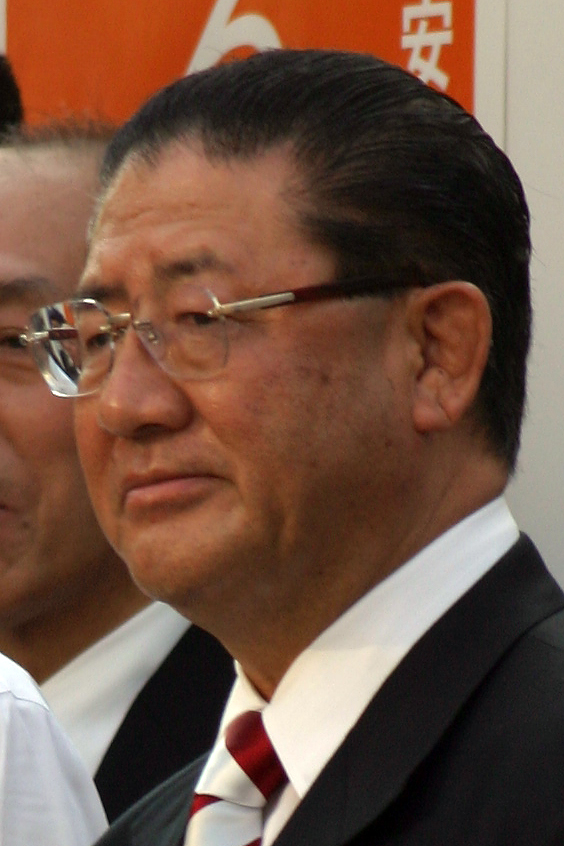
| Candidate | Keizō Obuchi | Koichi Kato | Taku Yamasaki |
| Leader's seat | Gunma 5th | Yamagata 4th | Fukuoka 2nd |
| LDP MPs | 253 (68.19%) | 85 (22.91%) | 33 (8.90%) |
| Party members | 97 (67.83%) | 28 (19.58%) | 18 (12.59%) |
| Total | 350 (68.09%) | 113 (21.99%) | 51 (9.92%) |
President before election
Keizō Obuchi
Elected President
Keizō Obuchi

The 1999 Liberal Democratic Party presidential election took place on 21 September 1999 to elect the leader and president of the Japanese Liberal Democratic Party (LDP).

== Overview ==
The election was held following the expiration of the 1997 LDP presidential election (where Ryutaro Hashimoto was re-elected unopposed). Keizō Obuchi, who had been first elected in the 1998 LDP presidential election, strongly desired unopposed re-election. He particularly sought to appease Koichi Kato, who had recently inherited the Kato faction, by hinting at being his successor. However, Kato ignored his appeal and ran alongside his ally and Taku Yamasaki, chairman of the Yamasaki faction. Kato, already considered a leading candidate for the future presidency, saw this as an ideal opportunity to demonstrate his support for Obuchi. Although he had anticipated losing, he actively promoted a "refreshing policy debate" in the hope of establishing a party-wide coalition following the election.

Obuchi won as expected, but Obuchi never forgave Kato for running against him and severely undermined the Kato faction in his subsequent appointments. This led to the Kato Rebellion the following year. On the other hand, the Seiwa Seisaku Kenkyūkai (Mori faction), whose chairman, Yoshirō Mori, had supported Obuchi as LDP Secretary-General, quickly withdrew from the race and supported Obuchi. Following this, Junichiro Koizumi, who had run in the previous two presidential elections, also withdrew. When Obuchi fell ill the following year, the prime ministerial position fell to Mori, who continued as secretary-general. During the "Kato Rebellion," Koizumi, who supported Mori as faction chairman, suppressed the rebellion and ultimately became prime minister himself in 2001.

As such, this presidential election contained several important foreshadowings of future political developments. It was Shinzo Abe, a young politician with only two election wins at the time, who strongly urged Mori, the faction chairman, to run. Abe later recalled with a wry smile that he was young himself, saying, "If Mori had run against him, as we young people demanded, he might not have become the next prime minister. Kato, who ran at that time, ultimately did not become prime minister".

== Candidates ==
=== Declared ===
| Candidate(s) | Date of birth | Current position | Party faction | Electoral district |
|---|---|---|---|---|
| Keizō Obuchi | 25 June 1937 (age 62) | Prime Minister (since 1998); President of the Liberal Democratic Party (since 1998); Member of the House of Representatives (since 1963) Previous offices held: Minister for Foreign Affairs (1997–1998); Chief Cabinet Secretary (1987–1989) | Heisei Kenkyūkai (Watanuki) | Gunma 5th |
| Koichi Kato | 17 June 1939 (age 60) | Member of the House of Representatives (since 1972) Previous offices held: Secretary-General of the Liberal Democratic Party (1995–1998); Chief Cabinet Secretary (1991–1992); Director-General of the Japan Defense Agency (1984–1986); Deputy Chief Cabinet Secretary (Political affairs) (1978–1980) | Kōchikai (Kato) | Yamagata 4th |
| Taku Yamasaki | 11 December 1936 (age 62) | Member of the House of Representatives (since 1972) Previous offices held: Minister of Construction (1991–1992); Director-General of the Japan Defense Agency (1989); Deputy Chief Cabinet Secretary (Political affairs) (1984–1985) | Kinmirai Seiji Kenkyūkai (Yamasaki) | Fukuoka 2nd |

== Results ==
Full results
| Candidate | Diet members | | Party members | | | | Total points | |
| Candidate | Votes | % | Popular votes | % | Allocated votes | % | Total votes | % |
|---|---|---|---|---|---|---|---|---|
| Keizō Obuchi 当 | 253 | 68.19% | | | 97 | 67.83% | 350 | 68.09% |
| Koichi Kato | 85 | 22.91% | | | 28 | 19.58% | 113 | 21.99% |
| Taku Yamasaki | 33 | 8.90% | | | 18 | 12.59% | 51 | 9.92% |
| Total | 371 | 100.00% | | | 143 | 100.00% | 514 | 100.00% |
| Valid votes | 371 | 100.00% | | | 143 | 100.00% | 514 | 100.00% |
| Invalid and blank votes | 0 | 0.00% | | | 0 | 0.00% | 0 | 0.00% |
| Turnout | 371 | 100.00% | 1,435,220 | 49.29% | 143 (Note: Party member votes were counted as one vote for every 10,000 votes, and these votes became the "party member counted votes".) | 100.00% | 514 | 100.00% |
| Registered voters | 371 | 100.00% | 2,911,519 | 100.00% | 143 | 100.00% | 514 | 100.00% |
