= President of the Liberal Democratic Party (Japan) =

Japanese political party leader

- 自由民主党総裁 (Jiyū-Minshutō Sōsai)
- Logo of the Liberal Democratic Party

- Flag of the Liberal Democratic Party

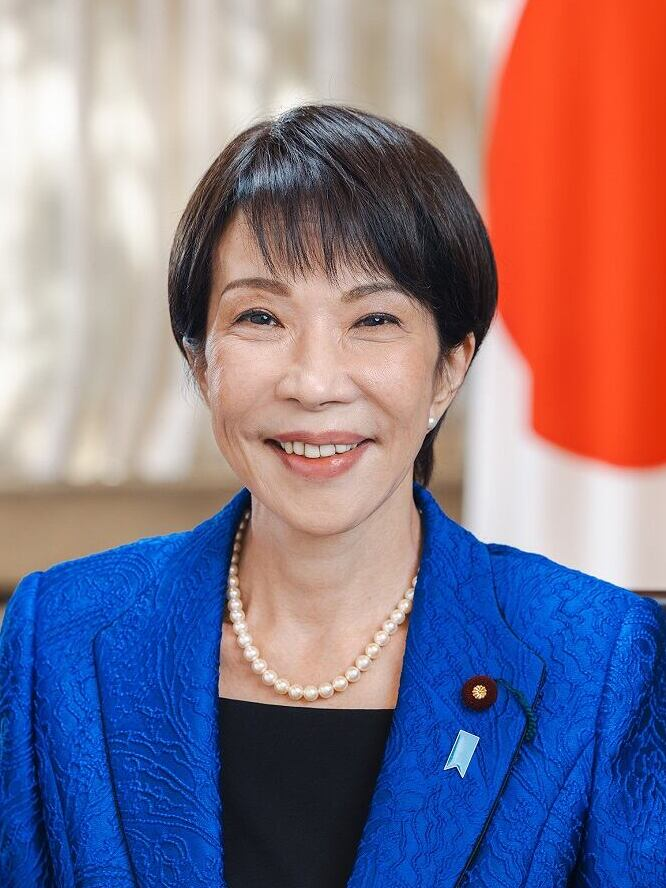
- Incumbent; Sanae Takaichi since 4 October 2025
- Liberal Democratic Party
- Type: Party leader
- Term length: Three years, renewable twice consecutively
- Inaugural holder: Ichirō Hatoyama
- Formation: 15 November 1955
- Deputy: Vice President; Secretary-General

The president of the Liberal Democratic Party (自由民主党総裁, Jiyū-Minshutō Sōsai) is the highest position and executive authority within Japan's Liberal Democratic Party. The current holder of the position is Sanae Takaichi, who was elected to the position on 4 October 2025, following her victory in the party's presidential election. She has served as Prime Minister of Japan and is the first woman to hold either of these roles.

Due to the dominance of the LDP in Japanese politics, twenty-six of the twenty-eight presidents (all except Yōhei Kōno and Sadakazu Tanigaki) have also been the prime minister.

== Elections ==
To be a candidate for the president, one must be an LDP member of the National Diet and must receive at least 20 nominations from other LDP members of the National Diet. The LDP selects its leader via a two-round election involving both LDP members of the Diet and dues-paying party members from across Japan. In the first round, all LDP members of the Diet cast one vote while party member votes are translated proportionally into votes equaling the other half of the total ballots. If any candidate wins a majority (over 50%) of votes in the first round, that candidate is elected president.

If no candidate receives a majority of votes in the first round, a runoff is held immediately between the top two candidates. In the runoff, all Diet members vote again while the 47 prefectural chapters of the LDP get one vote each, with the result of the latter votes determined using the first round results of party members in each prefecture. The candidate who wins the most votes in the runoff is then elected president.

The party's secretary-general can decide to organise the election with the rule of the second round only.

=== Term limits ===
According to Article 81 of the LDP Constitution, the president's term of office is three years, renewable twice consecutively. Limits have fluctuated over the years since LDP's founding (The latest revision was made by Shinzo Abe):

Period	Term of office	Term limits
1955–1972	2 years	Unlimited
1972–1974	3 years	Unlimited
1974–1978	3 years	Renewable once
1978–2003	2 years	Renewable once
2003–2017	3 years	Renewable once
2017–present	3 years	Renewable twice

== Powers ==
According to the LDP constitution, the president "shall assume supreme responsibility for the Party, and represent and oversee the Party". The president appoints the secretary-general, members of Finance Committee, and the director of the Forward Policy Study Unit, all with the approval of the General Council. The president also appoints the chairpersons of the Party Organization Headquarters, the Public Relations Headquarters, the Policy Research Council, the Election Strategy Council, and the Personnel Committee, as well as the director of the Forward Policy Study Unit, all with the approval of the General Council. The president can optionally appoint a vice president with the approval of the Party Convention.

The president convenes and presides over the work of the LDP Board, which includes other high-ranking members of the LDP. With the consent of the General Council, the president annually convenes the Party Convention. The president is ex officio the director-general of the Party's Election Strategy Headquarters, tasked with formulating the LDP's election strategies, and the chancellor of the Central Institute of Politics.

== Presidents of the party ==
No.	President (Lifespan)	Portrait	Faction	Constituency or title	Took office	Left office	Election results	Government		
No.	President (Lifespan)	Portrait	Faction	Constituency or title	Took office	Left office	Election results	Party	Prime Minister	Term
Preceding parties: Liberal Party (1950) and Democratic Party (1954)
Interim Leadership Committee (1955–1956)
—	Ichirō Hatoyama 鳩山 一郎 (1883–1959)		-	Rep for Tokyo 1st	15 November 1955	5 April 1956	None	LDP	himself	1954–1956
—	Bukichi Miki 三木 武吉 (1884–1956)			Rep for Kagawa 1st	15 November 1955	5 April 1956	None	LDP	Hatoyama I.	1954–1956
—	Banboku Ōno 大野 伴睦 (1890–1964)			Rep for Gifu 1st	15 November 1955	5 April 1956	None	LDP	Hatoyama I.	1954–1956
—	Taketora Ogata 緒方 竹虎 (1888–1956)			Rep for Fukuoka 1st	15 November 1955	28 January 1956 (Died in office)	None	LDP	Hatoyama I.	1954–1956
—	Tsuruhei Matsuno 松野 鶴平 (1883–1962)			Cou for Kumamoto	10 February 1956	5 April 1956	None	LDP	Hatoyama I.	1954–1956
President (1956–present)
1	Ichirō Hatoyama 鳩山 一郎 (1883–1959)			Rep for Tokyo 1st	5 April 1956	14 December 1956	Apr. 1956 Ichirō Hatoyama – 394; Nobusuke Kishi – 4 Others – 15	LDP	himself	1954–1956
2	Tanzan Ishibashi 石橋 湛山 (1884–1973)			Rep for Shizuoka 2nd	14 December 1956	21 March 1957	Dec. 1956 1st round Nobusuke Kishi – 223; Tanzan Ishibashi – 151; Mitsujiro Ishii – 137 Dec. 1956 2nd round Tanzan Ishibashi – 258; Nobusuke Kishi – 251	LDP	himself	1956–1957
3	Nobusuke Kishi 岸 信介 (1896–1987)		Seiwa Seisaku Kenkyūkai	Rep for Yamaguchi 1st	21 March 1957	14 July 1960	1957 Nobusuke Kishi – 471; Kenzō Matsumura – 2 Tokutaro Kitamura – 1 Mitsujirō Ishii – 1 1959 Nobusuke Kishi – 320; Kenzō Matsumura – 166; Others – 5	LDP	himself	1957–1960
4	Hayato Ikeda 池田 勇人 (1899–1965)		Kōchikai	Rep for Hiroshima 2nd	14 July 1960	1 December 1964	1960 1st Round Hayato Ikeda – 246; Mitsujirō Ishii – 194; Aiichirō Fujiyama – 49; Others – 7 1960 2nd Round Hayato Ikeda – 302; Mitsujirō Ishii – 194 1962 Hayato Ikeda – 391; Eisaku Satō – 17; Others – 20 Jul. 1964 Hayato Ikeda – 242; Eisaku Satō – 160; Aiichirō Fujiyama – 72; Hirokichi Nadao – 1	LDP	himself	1960–1964
5	Eisaku Satō 佐藤 栄作 (1901–1975)		pre Takeshita Heisei Kenkyūkai	Rep for Yamaguchi 2nd	1 December 1964	5 July 1972	Nov. 1964 Eisaku Satō – ✓ Aiichirō Fujiyama – ✗ Ichirō Kōno – ✗ 1966 Eisaku Satō – 289; Aiichirō Fujiyama – 89; Shigesaburō Maeo – 47; Hirokichi Nadao – 11; Uichi Noda – 9 Others – 5 1968 Eisaku Satō – 249; Takeo Miki – 107; Shigesaburō Maeo – 95; Others – 25 1970 Eisaku Satō – 353; Takeo Miki – 111; Others – 3	LDP	himself	1964–1972
6	Kakuei Tanaka 田中 角榮 (1918–1993)		pre Takeshita Heisei Kenkyūkai	Rep for Niigata 3rd	5 July 1972	4 December 1974	1972 Kakuei Tanaka – 282; Takeo Fukuda – 180	LDP	himself	1972–1974
7	Takeo Miki 三木 武夫 (1907–1988)		Banchō Seisaku Kenkyūjo	Rep for Tokushima at-large	4 December 1974	23 December 1976	1974 Takeo Miki – ✓ Takeo Fukuda – ✗ Masayoshi Ōhira – ✗ Yasuhiro Nakasone – ✗	LDP	himself	1974–1976
8	Takeo Fukuda 福田 赳夫 (1905–1995)		Seiwa Seisaku Kenkyūkai	Rep for Gunma 3rd	23 December 1976	1 December 1978	1976 Takeo Fukuda – ✓ Masayoshi Ōhira – ✗	LDP	himself	1976–1978
9	Masayoshi Ōhira 大平 正芳 (1910–1980)		Kōchikai	Rep for Kagawa 2nd	1 December 1978	12 June 1980 (Died in office)	1978 1st round Masayoshi Ōhira – 748; Fukuda Takeo – 638; Yasuhiro Nakasone – 93; Toshio Kōmoto – 46 1978 2nd round Unopposed	LDP	himself	1978–1980
—	Eiichi Nishimura 西村 英一 (1897–1987); Acting President			Rep for Ōita 2nd	12 June 1980	15 July 1980	Acting	LDP	(Ito M.)	1980; Acting
10	Zenkō Suzuki 鈴木 善幸 (1911–2004)		Kōchikai	Rep for Iwate 1st	15 July 1980	25 November 1982	Jul. 1980 Zenko Suzuki – ✓ Kiichi Miyazawa – ✗ Yasuhiro Nakasone – ✗ Toshio Kōmoto – ✗ Nov. 1980 Unopposed	LDP	himself	1980–1982
11	Yasuhiro Nakasone 中曽根 康弘 (1918–2019)		Seisaku Kagaku Kenkyūjo	Rep for Gunma 3rd	25 November 1982	31 October 1987	1982 1st Round Yasuhiro Nakasone – 57.6% (559,673); Toshio Kōmoto – 27.2% (265,078); Shintarō Abe – 8.2% (80,443); Ichirō Nakagawa – 6.8% (66,041) 1982 2nd Round Unopposed 1984 Unopposed walkover 1986 1-year extension	LDP	himself	1982–1987
12	Noboru Takeshita 竹下 登 (1924–2000)		Heisei Kenkyūkai	Rep for Shimane at-large	31 October 1987	2 June 1989	1987 Noboru Takeshita – ✓ Shintarō Abe – ✗ Kiichi Miyazawa – ✗	LDP	himself	1987–1989
13	Sōsuke Uno 宇野 宗佑 (1922–1998)		allied with the Seisaku Kagaku Kenkyūjo	Rep for Shiga at-large	2 June 1989	8 August 1989	Jun. 1989 Sōsuke Uno – ✓ Masayoshi Itō – ✗	LDP	himself	Jun–Aug 1989
14	Toshiki Kaifu 海部 俊樹 (1931–2022)			Rep for Aichi 3rd	8 August 1989	30 October 1991	Aug. 1989 1st round Toshiki Kaifu – 279; Yoshirō Hayashi – 120; Shintarō Ishihara – 48 Aug. 1989 2nd round Unopposed	LDP	himself	1989–1991
15	Kiichi Miyazawa 宮澤 喜一 (1919–2007)		Kōchikai	Rep for Hiroshima 3rd	31 October 1991	29 July 1993	1991 Kiichi Miyazawa – 285; Michio Wantanabe – 120; Hiroshi Mitsuzuka – 87	LDP	himself	1991–1993
16	Yōhei Kōno 河野 洋平 (1937–2026)		Kōchikai	Rep for Kanagawa 5th	29 July 1993	1 October 1995	1993 1st round Yōhei Kōno – 208; Michio Wantanabe – 159 1993 2nd round Unopposed	JNP	Hosokawa	1993–1994
16	Yōhei Kōno 河野 洋平 (1937–2026)		Kōchikai	Rep for Kanagawa 5th	29 July 1993	1 October 1995	1993 1st round Yōhei Kōno – 208; Michio Wantanabe – 159 1993 2nd round Unopposed	JRP	Hata	Apr–Jun 1994
16	Yōhei Kōno 河野 洋平 (1937–2026)		Kōchikai	Rep for Kanagawa 5th	29 July 1993	1 October 1995	1993 1st round Yōhei Kōno – 208; Michio Wantanabe – 159 1993 2nd round Unopposed	JSP	Murayama (coalition)	1994–1996
17	Ryutaro Hashimoto 橋本 龍太郎 (1937–2006)		Heisei Kenkyūkai	Rep for Okayama 4th	1 October 1995	24 July 1998	1995 Ryutaro Hashimoto – 304; Junichiro Koizumi – 87 1997 Unopposed walkover	JSP	Murayama (coalition)	1994–1996
17	Ryutaro Hashimoto 橋本 龍太郎 (1937–2006)		Heisei Kenkyūkai	Rep for Okayama 4th	1 October 1995	24 July 1998	1995 Ryutaro Hashimoto – 304; Junichiro Koizumi – 87 1997 Unopposed walkover	LDP	himself	1996–1998
18	Keizō Obuchi 小渕 恵三 (1937–2000)		Heisei Kenkyūkai	Rep for Gunma 5th	24 July 1998	5 April 2000	1998 Keizō Obuchi – 225; Seiroku Kajiyama – 102; Junichiro Koizumi – 84 1999 Keizō Obuchi – 350; Koichi Kato – 113; Taku Yamasaki – 51	LDP	himself	1998–2000
19	Yoshirō Mori 森 喜朗 (born 1937)		Seiwa Seisaku Kenkyūkai	Rep for Ishikawa 2nd	5 April 2000	24 April 2001	2000 Yoshirō Mori – ✓ Mikio Aoki – ✗ Masakuni Murakami – ✗ Hiromu Nonaka – ✗ Shizuka Kamei – ✗	LDP	himself	2000–2001
20	Junichiro Koizumi 小泉 純一郎 (born 1942)		Seiwa Seisaku Kenkyūkai	Rep for Kanagawa 11th	24 April 2001	20 September 2006	2001 1st Round Junichiro Koizumi – 298; Ryutaro Hashimoto – 155; Tarō Asō – 31 2001 2nd Round Unopposed 2003 Junichiro Koizumi – 339; Shizuka Kamei – 139; Takao Fujii – 65; Masahiko Kōmura – 54	LDP	himself	2001–2006
21	Shinzo Abe 安倍 晋三 (1954–2022)		Seiwa Seisaku Kenkyūkai	Rep for Yamaguchi 4th	20 September 2006	23 September 2007	2006 Shinzo Abe – 464; Tarō Asō – 136; Sadakazu Tanigaki – 102	LDP	himself	2006–2007
22	Yasuo Fukuda 福田 康夫 (1936-2026)			Rep for Gunma 4th	23 September 2007	22 September 2008	2007 Yasuo Fukuda – 330; Tarō Asō – 197	LDP	himself	2007–2008
23	Tarō Asō 麻生 太郎 (born 1940)		Kōchikai	Rep for Fukuoka 8th	22 September 2008	28 September 2009	2008 Tarō Asō – 351; Kaoru Yosano – 66; Yuriko Koike – 46; Nobuteru Ishihara – 37; Shigeru Ishiba – 25	LDP	himself	2008–2009
24	Sadakazu Tanigaki 谷垣 禎一 (born 1945)		Kōchikai	Rep for Kyoto 5th	28 September 2009	26 September 2012	2009 Sadakazu Tanigaki – 300; Taro Kono – 144; Yasutoshi Nishimura – 54	DPJ	Hatoyama Y.	2009–2010
24	Sadakazu Tanigaki 谷垣 禎一 (born 1945)		Kōchikai	Rep for Kyoto 5th	28 September 2009	26 September 2012	2009 Sadakazu Tanigaki – 300; Taro Kono – 144; Yasutoshi Nishimura – 54	DPJ	Kan	2010–2011
24	Sadakazu Tanigaki 谷垣 禎一 (born 1945)		Kōchikai	Rep for Kyoto 5th	28 September 2009	26 September 2012	2009 Sadakazu Tanigaki – 300; Taro Kono – 144; Yasutoshi Nishimura – 54	DPJ	Noda	2011–2012
25 (21)	Shinzo Abe 安倍 晋三 (1954–2022)		Seiwa Seisaku Kenkyūkai	Rep for Yamaguchi 4th	26 September 2012	14 September 2020	2012 1st Round Shinzo Abe – 141; Shigeru Ishiba – 199; Nobuteru Ishihara – 96; Nobutaka Machimura 34; Yoshimasa Hayashi – 27 2012 2nd Round Shinzo Abe – 108; Shigeru Ishiba – 89 2015 Unopposed walkover 2018 Shinzo Abe – 553; Shigeru Ishiba – 254	DPJ	Noda	2011–2012
25 (21)	Shinzo Abe 安倍 晋三 (1954–2022)		Seiwa Seisaku Kenkyūkai	Rep for Yamaguchi 4th	26 September 2012	14 September 2020	2012 1st Round Shinzo Abe – 141; Shigeru Ishiba – 199; Nobuteru Ishihara – 96; Nobutaka Machimura 34; Yoshimasa Hayashi – 27 2012 2nd Round Shinzo Abe – 108; Shigeru Ishiba – 89 2015 Unopposed walkover 2018 Shinzo Abe – 553; Shigeru Ishiba – 254	LDP	himself	2012–2020
26	Yoshihide Suga 菅 義偉 (born 1948)			Rep for Kanagawa 2nd	14 September 2020	29 September 2021	2020 Yoshihide Suga – 377; Fumio Kishida – 89; Shigeru Ishiba – 68	LDP	himself	2020–2021
27	Fumio Kishida 岸田 文雄 (born 1957)		Kōchikai	Rep for Hiroshima 1st	29 September 2021	27 September 2024	2021 1st Round Fumio Kishida – 256; Taro Kono – 255; Sanae Takaichi – 188; Seiko Noda – 63 2021 2nd Round Fumio Kishida – 257; Taro Kono – 170	LDP	himself	2021–2024
28	Shigeru Ishiba 石破 茂 (born 1957)		(none) Formerly Heisei Kenkyūkai	Rep for Tottori 1st	27 September 2024	4 October 2025	2024 1st Round Sanae Takaichi – 181; Shigeru Ishiba – 154; Shinjirō Koizumi – 136; Yoshimasa Hayashi – 65; Takayuki Kobayashi – 60; Toshimitsu Motegi – 47; Yōko Kamikawa – 40; Taro Kono – 30; Katsunobu Katō – 22 2024 2nd Round Shigeru Ishiba – 215; Sanae Takaichi – 194	LDP	himself	2024–2025
29	Sanae Takaichi 高市 早苗 (born 1961)		(Seiwa Seisaku Kenkyūkai)	Rep for Nara 2nd	4 October 2025	Incumbent	2025 1st Round Sanae Takaichi – 183; Shinjirō Koizumi – 164; Yoshimasa Hayashi – 134; Takayuki Kobayashi – 59; Toshimitsu Motegi – 49 2025 2nd Round Sanae Takaichi – 185; Shinjirō Koizumi – 156	LDP	herself	2025–present

== Presidential elections ==
Bold indicates the winners.

Date		1st	2nd	3rd	4th	5th	6th	7th	8th	9th	Spoilt vote
5 April 1956		**Ichirō Hatoyama**	Nobusuke Kishi	Jōji Hayashi	Tanzan Ishibashi; Mitsujirō Ishii; Shūji Masutani; Banboku Ōno	Ichirō Kōno; Mamoru Shigemitsu; Tsuruhei Matsuno; Hayato Ikeda					5
5 April 1956		394	4	3	2	1					5
14 December 1956	First round	Nobusuke Kishi	Tanzan Ishibashi	Mitsujirō Ishii							0
14 December 1956	First round	223	151	137							0
14 December 1956	Runoff	**Tanzan Ishibashi**	Nobusuke Kishi								0
14 December 1956	Runoff	258	251								0
21 March 1957		**Nobusuke Kishi**	Kenzō Matsumura	Mitsujirō Ishii; Tokutarō Kitamura							0
21 March 1957		471	2	1							0
14 January 1959		**Nobusuke Kishi**	Kenzō Matsumura	Banboku Ōno; Shigeru Yoshida; Mitsujirō Ishii; Shūji Masutani; Eisaku Satō							0
14 January 1959		320	166	1							0
14 July 1960	First round	Hayato Ikeda	Mitsujirō Ishii	Aiichirō Fujiyama	Kenzō Matsumura	Banboku Ōno					0
14 July 1960	First round	246	196	49	5	1					0
14 July 1960	Runoff	**Hayato Ikeda**	Mitsujirō Ishii								0
14 July 1960	Runoff	302	194								0
14 July 1962		**Hayato Ikeda**	Eisaku Satō	Hisato Ichimada	Nobusuke Kishi	Aiichirō Fujiyama	Shigeru Yoshida; Takeo Fukuda	Hitoshi Takahashi; Matsutarō Shōriki			0
14 July 1962		391	17	6	5	3	2	1			0
10 July 1964		**Hayato Ikeda**	Eisaku Satō	Aiichirō Fujiyama	Hirokichi Nadao						0
10 July 1964		242	160	72	1						0
1 December 1964		**Eisaku Satō**	One candidate (elected by Ikeda)								
1 December 1966		**Eisaku Satō**	Aiichirō Fujiyama	Shigesaburō Maeo	Hirokichi Nadao	Uichi Noda	Zentarō Kosaka	Nobusuke Kishi; Kenzō Matsumura; Isamu Murakami			0
1 December 1966		289	89	47	11	9	2	1			0
27 November 1968		**Eisaku Satō**	Takeo Miki	Shigesaburō Maeo	Aiichirō Fujiyama						0
27 November 1968		249	107	95	1						0
29 October 1970		**Eisaku Satō**	Takeo Miki	Saburō Chiba; Aiichirō Fujiyama; Tokuma Utsunomiya							0
29 October 1970		353	111	1							0
5 July 1972	First round	Kakuei Tanaka	Takeo Fukuda	Masayoshi Ōhira	Takeo Miki						7
5 July 1972	First round	156	150	101	69						7
5 July 1972	Runoff	**Kakuei Tanaka**	Takeo Fukuda								0
5 July 1972	Runoff	282	190								0
4 December 1974		**Takeo Miki**	One candidate (elected by Vice-President Etsusaburō Shiina)								
23 December 1976		**Takeo Fukuda**	One candidate (elected by discussion at the general meeting of LDP National Diet members of both houses)								
26 November 1978	Primaries	Masayoshi Ōhira	Takeo Fukuda	Yasuhiro Nakasone	Toshio Kōmoto						0
26 November 1978	Primaries	748 pts	638 pts	93 pts	46 pts						0
26 November 1978	Runoff	**Masayoshi Ōhira**	2nd candidate withdrew								
15 July 1980		**Zenkō Suzuki**	One candidate (elected by Vice-President Eiichi Nishimura)								
27 November 1980		**Zenkō Suzuki**	One candidate (re-elected without voting in the leadership election due to the expiration of the term of office of Suzuki)								
24 November 1982	Primaries	Yasuhiro Nakasone	Toshio Kōmoto	Shintaro Abe	Ichiro Nakagawa						0
24 November 1982	Primaries	559673	265078	80443	66041						0
24 November 1982	Runoff	**Yasuhiro Nakasone**	2nd and below candidates withdrew								
30 October 1984		**Yasuhiro Nakasone**	One candidate (re-elected without voting in the leadership election due to the expiration of the term of office of Nakasone)								
11 September 1986		**Yasuhiro Nakasone**	Extension of term of office by one year (Unanimously re-elected Nakasone's term of office at the general meeting of LDP National Diet members of both houses)								
31 October 1987		**Noboru Takeshita**	One candidate (elected by Nakasone)								
2 June 1989		**Sōsuke Uno**	One candidate (elected by Takeshita)								
8 August 1989		**Toshiki Kaifu**	Yoshiro Hayashi	Shintaro Ishihara							0
8 August 1989		279	120	48							0
31 October 1989		**Toshiki Kaifu**	One candidate (re-elected without voting in the leadership election due to the expiration of the term of office of Kaifu)								
27 October 1991		**Kiichi Miyazawa**	Michio Watanabe	Hiroshi Mitsuzuka							0
27 October 1991		285	120	87							0
30 July 1993		**Yōhei Kōno**	Michio Watanabe								0
30 July 1993		208	159								0
30 September 1993		**Yōhei Kōno**	One candidate (re-elected without voting in the leadership election due to the expiration of the term of office of Kōno)								
22 September 1995		**Ryutaro Hashimoto**	Junichiro Koizumi								0
22 September 1995		304	87								0
11 September 1997		**Ryutaro Hashimoto**	One candidate (re-elected without voting in the leadership election due to the expiration of the term of office of Hashimoto)								
24 July 1998		**Keizō Obuchi**	Seiroku Kajiyama	Junichiro Koizumi							0
24 July 1998		225	102	84							0
21 September 1999 (Detail)		**Keizō Obuchi**	Koichi Kato	Taku Yamasaki							0
21 September 1999 (Detail)		350	113	51							0
5 April 2000 (Detail)		**Yoshirō Mori**	One candidate (elected by discussion at the general meeting of LDP National Diet members of both houses)								
24 April 2001 (Detail)		**Junichiro Koizumi**	Ryutaro Hashimoto	Tarō Asō	(Shizuka Kamei withdrew after the ballot counting)						3
24 April 2001 (Detail)		298	155	31	(Shizuka Kamei withdrew after the ballot counting)						3
10 August 2001 (Detail)		**Junichiro Koizumi**	One candidate (re-elected without voting in the leadership election due to the expiration of the term of office of Koizumi)								
20 September 2003 (Detail)		**Junichiro Koizumi**	Shizuka Kamei	Takao Fujii	Masahiko Kōmura						0
20 September 2003 (Detail)		399	139	65	54						0
20 September 2006 (Detail)		**Shinzo Abe**	Tarō Asō	Sadakazu Tanigaki							1
20 September 2006 (Detail)		464	136	102							1
23 September 2007 (Detail)		**Yasuo Fukuda**	Tarō Asō								1
23 September 2007 (Detail)		330	197								1
22 September 2008 (Detail)		**Tarō Asō**	Kaoru Yosano	Yuriko Koike	Nobuteru Ishihara	Shigeru Ishiba					2
22 September 2008 (Detail)		351	66	46	37	25					2
28 September 2009 (Detail)		**Sadakazu Tanigaki**	Taro Kono	Yasutoshi Nishimura							1
28 September 2009 (Detail)		300	144	54							1
26 September 2012 (Detail)	First round	Shigeru Ishiba	Shinzo Abe	Nobuteru Ishihara	Nobutaka Machimura	Yoshimasa Hayashi					1
26 September 2012 (Detail)	First round	199	141	96	34	27					1
26 September 2012 (Detail)	Runoff	**Shinzo Abe**	Shigeru Ishiba								1
26 September 2012 (Detail)	Runoff	108	89								1
8 September 2015 (Detail)		**Shinzo Abe**	One candidate (re-elected without voting in the leadership election due to the expiration of the term of office of Abe)								
20 September 2018 (Detail)		**Shinzo Abe**	Shigeru Ishiba								3
20 September 2018 (Detail)		553	254								3
14 September 2020 (Detail)		**Yoshihide Suga**	Fumio Kishida	Shigeru Ishiba							0
14 September 2020 (Detail)		377	89	68							0
29 September 2021 (Detail)	First round	Fumio Kishida	Taro Kono	Sanae Takaichi	Seiko Noda						1
29 September 2021 (Detail)	First round	256	255	188	63						1
29 September 2021 (Detail)	Runoff	**Fumio Kishida**	Taro Kono								1
29 September 2021 (Detail)	Runoff	257	170								1
27 September 2024 (Detail)	First round	Sanae Takaichi	Shigeru Ishiba	Shinjirō Koizumi	Yoshimasa Hayashi	Takayuki Kobayashi	Toshimitsu Motegi	Yōko Kamikawa	Taro Kono	Katsunobu Katō	1
27 September 2024 (Detail)	First round	181	154	136	65	60	47	40	30	22	1
27 September 2024 (Detail)	Runoff	**Shigeru Ishiba**	Sanae Takaichi								
27 September 2024 (Detail)	Runoff	215	194								
4 October 2025 (Detail)	First round	Sanae Takaichi	Shinjirō Koizumi	Yoshimasa Hayashi	Takayuki Kobayashi	Toshimitsu Motegi					
4 October 2025 (Detail)	First round	183	164	134	59	49					
4 October 2025 (Detail)	Runoff	**Sanae Takaichi**	Shinjirō Koizumi							0	
4 October 2025 (Detail)	Runoff	185	156							0	
