= Gonin Gumi (meeting) =

2000 Liberal Democratic Party presidential election
- 5 April 2000 (Diet vote)
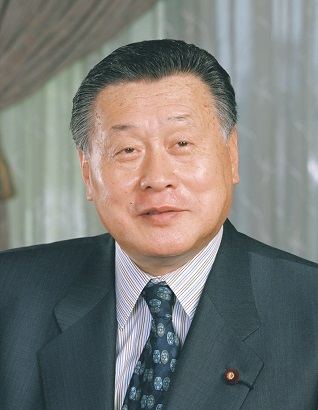
Candidate	Yoshirō Mori
Leader's seat	Ishikawa 2nd
Vote	No vote
President before election
Keizo Obuchi
Elected President
Yoshirō Mori

The Gonin Gumi (Japanese: 五人組; lit. group of five) were five influential members of the Japanese Liberal Democratic Party who met to select a successor to Prime Minister Keizō Obuchi following his stroke and cereberal infarction in April 2000. They are also known as the "Akapri Five" because they met at the Akasaka Prince Hotel.

During the meeting, Murakami remarked, "Why don't you do it?", which led to the decision to appoint Yoshirō Mori as the Prime Minister.

== Members ==
Member(s)	Date of birth	Current position	Party faction	Electoral district
Yoshirō Mori	14 July 1937 (age 65)	Secretary-General of the Liberal Democratic Party (1993–1995; since 1998); Member of the House of Representatives (since 1969) Previous offices held: Minister of Construction (1995–1996); Minister of International Trade and Industry (1992–1993); Minister of Education (1983–1984); Deputy Chief Cabinet Secretary (Political affairs) (1977–1978)	Seiwa Seisaku Kenkyūkai (Mori)	Ishikawa 2nd
Mikio Aoki	8 June 1934 (age 63)	Acting Prime Minister (since 2000); Chief Cabinet Secretary (since 1999); Member of the House of Councillors (since 1986)	Heisei Kenkyūkai (Watanuki)	Shimane at-large
Masakuni Murakami	21 August 1932 (age 67)	Member of the House of Councillors (since 1980) Previous offices held: Minister of Labour (1992–1993)	Shisuikai (Eto)	National PR block
Hiromu Nonaka	20 October 1925 (age 74)	Deputy Secretary-General of the Liberal Democratic Party (since 1996); Member of the House of Representatives (since 1983) Previous offices held: Chief Cabinet Secretary (1998–1999); Minister of Home Affairs (1994–1995); Chairman of the National Public Safety Commission (1994–1995)	Heisei Kenkyūkai (Watanuki)	Kyoto 4th
Shizuka Kamei	1 November 1936 (age 63)	Member of the House of Representatives (since 1979) Previous offices held: Minister of Construction (1996–1997); Minister of Transport (1994–1995)	Shisuikai (Eto)	Hiroshima 6th

== Timeline ==
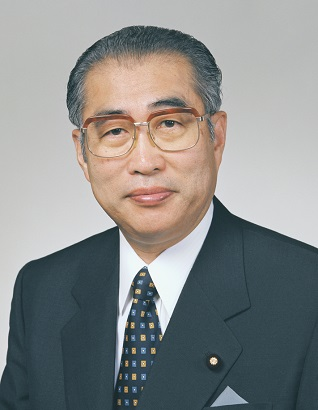
Keizo Obuchi, then prime minister and LDP president, suffered a cerebral infarction

- 2 April
  - Around 01:00, Prime Minister Keizo Obuchi was admitted to Juntendo University Shizuoka Hospita with an urgent condition.
  - Around 02:00, Parliamentary Secretary to the Prime Minister Toshitaka Furukawa notified Chief Cabinet Secretary Mikio Aoki of the Prime Minister's hospitalisation.
  - Around 06:00, Aoki's doctor visited.
  - Around 12:00, in response to the emergency, Aoki, Mori, Murakami, Nonaka, and Kamei met at the Hotel New Otani. Discussions about the appointment of an acting prime minister and the succession of the prime minister began.
  - Around 19:00, Aoki visited Juntendo Hospital and met alone with the bedridden Obuchi (however, some media outlets have suggested that, given Obuchi's condition, Aoki was unable to meet with him).
  - At 23:00, Aoki held an emergency press conference, officially announcing that the Prime Minister had been "hospitalised due to poor health".
- 3 April
  - Around midnight, Aoki, Mori, Murakami, Nonaka, and Kamei gathered at the same hotel, where Chief Cabinet Secretary Aoki appointed Acting Prime Minister and Yoshiro Mori as the successor. They also confirmed the Cabinet's resignation, the House of Representatives and House of Councillors plenary sessions, and the Cabinet formation schedule.
  - At 11:00, at the regular press conference, Aoki announced for the first time that Obuchi had suffered a cerebral infarction, and announced that he had assumed the role of Acting Prime Minister based on Obuchi's designation.
- 4 April
  - At 19:00, the Cabinet resigned.
- 5 April
  - In the morning, the LDP elected Mori as president at the joint meeting of both houses of the National Diet.
  - In the afternoon, Mori was appointed Prime Minister at a plenary session of both the House of Representatives and the House of Councillors, and in the evening the First Mori Cabinet took office.

== Problems ==
Upon Aoki's appointment as acting prime minister by the hospitalized Prime Minister Obuchi, controversy arose over whether it was timely and medically possible for the sick Prime Minister to appoint an acting prime minister of his own volition, and the legitimacy of Aoki's appointment as acting prime minister was called into question. Incidentally, during the Obuchi administration, acting prime ministers had been appointed 12 times during Obuchi's overseas trips and had all been Chief Cabinet Secretaries (Nonaka and Aoki).

The Democratic Party of Japan filed a complaint against Obuchi, alleging that his announcement at a press conference that he had been designated acting prime minister and his submission of the notice of his resignation to the Speakers of both the House of Representatives and the House of Councillors constituted misrepresentation of official position and forgery of a public document bearing a seal. However, the Tokyo District Public Prosecutors Office found no evidence to refute Aoki's explanation that he had been told in a private conversation with Obuchi. Given that Aoki had previously been appointed acting prime minister during Obuchi's overseas trips, it was not unnatural for Obuchi to request that Aoki assume the role of acting prime minister. Furthermore, upon Obuchi's death in May 2000, further investigation was difficult, leading the case to be dismissed in April 2001 for insufficient evidence.

In response to questions from the opposition parties in the National Diet, the Cabinet Legislation Bureau responded that if the Prime Minister becomes unable to perform his duties without appointing an acting Prime Minister as provided for in Article 9 of the Cabinet Law, "there is no other way, and it is logically permitted", and that an acting Prime Minister can be appointed from among the Cabinet ministers through "consultation" (as a Cabinet meeting cannot be held in the absence of the Prime Minister) among the Cabinet ministers other than the Prime Minister", and regarding the resignation of the Cabinet if the Prime Minister becomes unconscious, "if the Prime Minister is unconscious and there is no prospect of recovery in the near future, it is appropriate to interpret this as falling under the category of 'when the Prime Minister is vacant' (as provided for in Article 70 of the Constitution of Japan, which provides for the resignation of the Cabinet".

In order to avoid similar situations where the Prime Minister becomes unable to perform his duties without designating an acting Prime Minister, starting with the Mori Cabinet, it became customary to designate five acting Prime Ministers in advance (by publishing this in the Official Gazette) when forming a Cabinet.

== The meeting ==
- Yukihiko Ikeda, chairman of the LDP's General Council (Kato faction), who was one of the top three leaders of the party, was not present at the meeting. This was because Ikeda was not good at party affairs and was in poor health, despite Mori's urging him to attend. It was agreed that the five members would communicate by phone as needed regarding Mori's support for Prime Minister.
- In his resume, Mori wrote, "At the late-night meeting of the five senior officials, the conclusion was quickly reached that 'Mr. Mori, you are the only candidate to succeed me.' Mr. Nonaka said, 'The Komeito Party also said that Mr. Mori is fine.' Both Mr. Kamei Shizuka, Chairman of the Policy Research Council, and Mr. Murakami Masakuni, Chairman of the House of Councillors, supported me. I contacted Mr. Ikeda Yukihiko, Chairman of the General Affairs Committee (who was absent due to poor health), by phone, and he replied, 'I am fine with that too.'"
- In a memoir later published in Shukan Shincho, Murakami countered, "The party president was selected through proper internal party procedures at a general meeting of LDP members of both houses of the Diet, so it was not a decision made behind closed doors."
- Nonaka revealed in his memoirs that "Aoki explained this (that it would be difficult for Prime Minister Obuchi to return to his official duties), and after a period of heavy silence, Murakami Masakuni said, 'Mori, isn't it better for you to do it?' Murakami replied, 'That's right,' and Kamei agreed, and Mori's successor was decided."
- Mori responded, "The agreement reached by the five of us was that the executive committee would recommend me as the next presidential candidate. When the next president is put to the plenary meeting of both houses of the Diet, other candidates can run. It wasn't decided behind closed doors. If Koichi Kato had wanted to run, he should have put his hand up. He didn't put his hand up himself, and said Mori was fine". He also pointed out that the LDP was at a critical political juncture, with the issue of leaving the coalition. At the time, the budget bill had passed, but related bills remained pending. Holding a presidential election through normal procedures would have created a one-month gap in the political calendar. This point was not only raised by Mori, but also by Keiichiro Nakamura, who stated that if a presidential election had been held after a one-month gap, the public would have criticized it.
- Kamei recalled, "Aoki couldn't continue as acting prime minister, so Murakami and I urged Mori to take on the role. Mori was more than happy to accept it. Aoki and I were senior colleagues at Waseda, so we were good friends. He was well-liked, and there was no opposition." "The three-party coalition government of the LDP, Liberal Party, and Komeito was certainly at the mercy of Ozawa. Regardless of whether it was related to Prime Minister Obuchi's illness, senior LDP and government officials quickly met in a room at Akapuri to discuss immediate responses. Why don't you take on the role next? The Secretary-General is also doing it." Murakami responded to Mori with a positive expression, so I encouraged him, saying, "You want to do it, don't you?" People said it was a closed-door political party, but the leaders of all the factions except the Kōchikai gathered. A joint meeting of both houses of parliament was held later, so it wasn't a conspiracy."
- It is said that the failure to nominate Kato, who was considered a likely candidate for the next prime minister, was a contributing factor to Kato's Rebellion. Murakami later reflected that "they were probably unconsciously wary of Kato, who was aiming to succeed Obuchi."
- Yoichi Serigawa, a fellow at the Nikkei Shimbun, wrote in his book, "For the Obuchi faction, which was the party president's faction, the most important thing was to prevent the transfer of power. The Obuchi faction controlled the axis of power, along with Chief Cabinet Secretary Aoki and the party's Secretary-General Nonaka, who succeeded Mori. The Murakami-Kamei faction also controlled the House of Councillors and the Policy Research Council, and thus played a part in the power structure. A self-serving coalition government was formed between the Mori faction, the Obuchi faction, and the Murakami-Kamei faction. It also prevented former Secretary-General Kato Koichi, a leading candidate to succeed Obuchi, from emerging. However, because a presidential election was not even formally held, the Mori administration was plagued by criticism that it was the product of closed-door discussions among a group of five people. The legitimacy of the election was seen as questionable."

== See also ==
- President of the Liberal Democratic Party
