= 2015 Liberal Democratic Party presidential election =

Political leadership election in Japan

- 8 September 2015
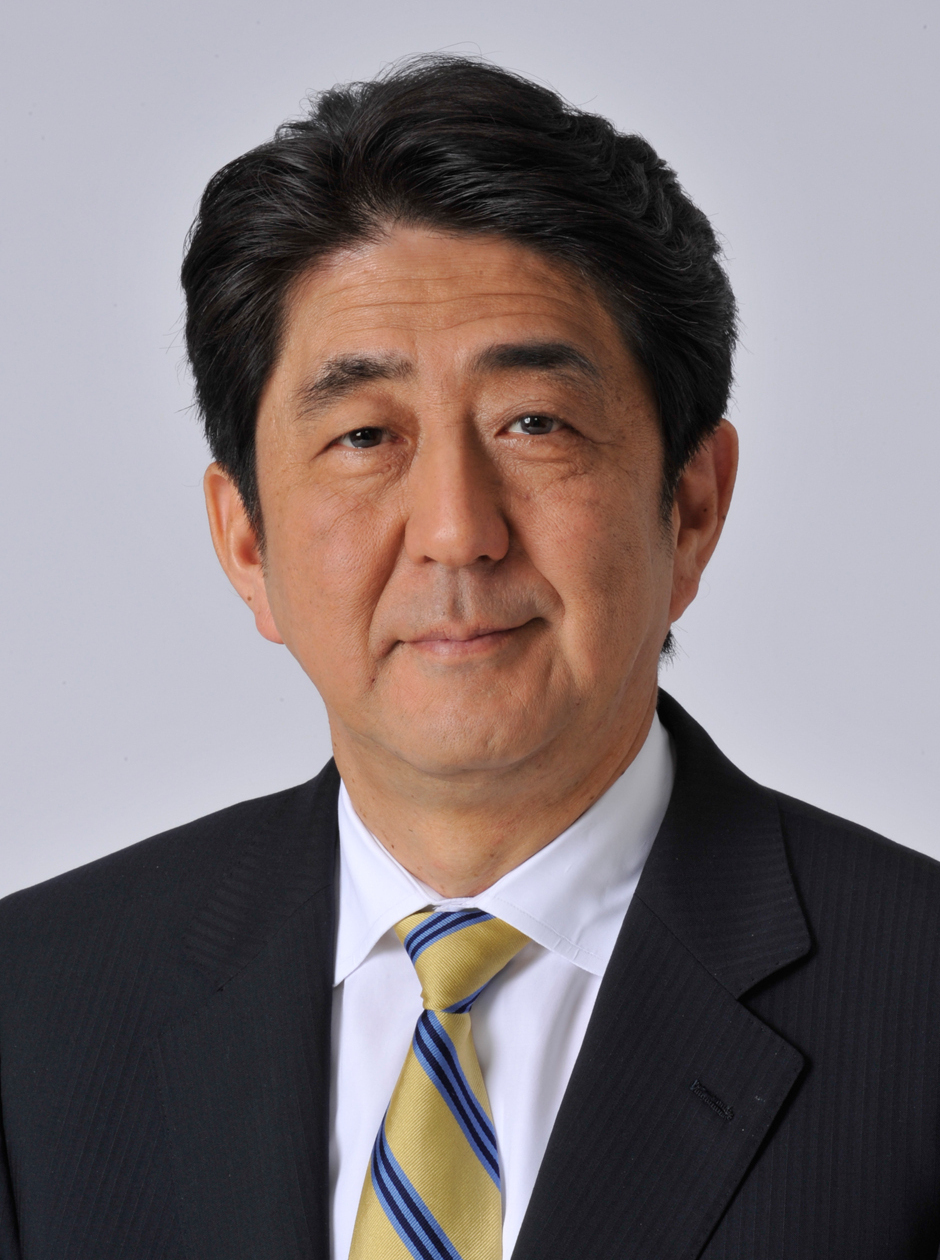
Candidate	Shinzo Abe
Leader's seat	Yamaguchi 4th
LDP MPs	Unopposed
Party members	Unopposed
Total	Unopposed
President before election
Shinzo Abe
Elected President
Shinzo Abe

A presidential election was scheduled to be held on 20 September 2015 to elect the next president of the Liberal Democratic Party of Japan for a new 3-year term. Incumbent president Shinzo Abe was running for his re-election.

As no other candidates besides Abe received enough nominations to contest the position, Abe was declared re-elected on 8 September 2015 without a vote.

== Candidate ==
The presidential election was scheduled to be held on 20 September 2015. However, there were no candidates other than the incumbent Shinzo Abe. Abe was therefore declared re-elected without a vote on 8 September 2015.

In addition to Abe, Seiko Noda, a former member of the Liberal Democratic Party's General Affairs Council, expressed her willingness to run, but failed to attract 20 endorsements and announced on the announcement day that she would give up running.

=== Nominated ===
Candidate(s)	Date of birth	Notable positions	Party faction(s)	District(s)
Shinzo Abe	21 September 1954 (age 60)	President of the LDP (2006–2007, since 2012); Prime Minister (2006–2007, since 2012); Member of the House of Representatives (since 1993); Chief Cabinet Secretary (2005–2006)	Seiwa Seisaku Kenkyūkai (Hosoda)	Yamaguchi 4th

=== Expressed intention but did not have enough votes for nomination ===
- Seiko Noda.
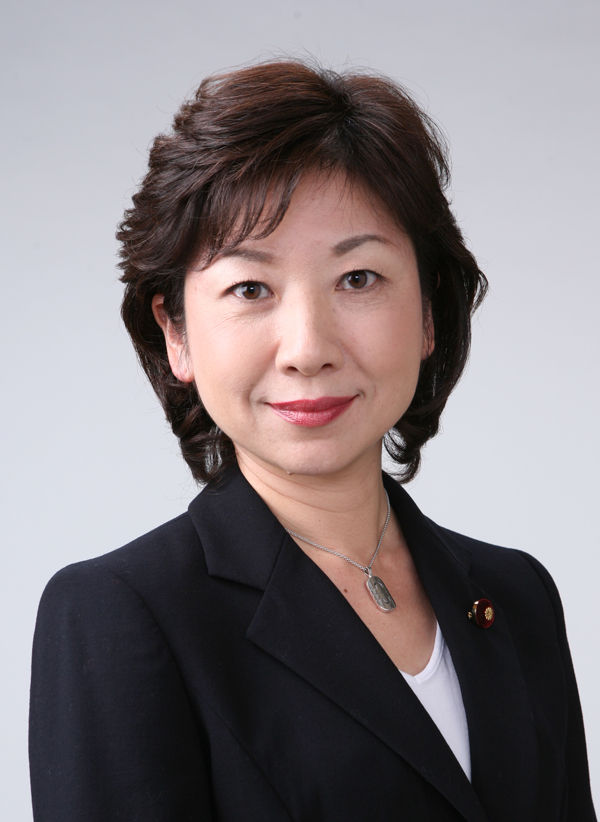
Minister of State for Science and Technology Policy
Seiko Noda
(2008–2009)

== Supporters ==
=== Recommenders ===
Party regulations require candidates to have the written support at least 20 Diet members, known as recommenders, to run.

Shinzo Abe

Leader of recommenders

- Takeo Kawamura (Member of the House of Representatives for Yamaguchi 3rd district) (Shisuikai)

Recommenders

- Yoshitami Kameoka (Member of the House of Representatives for Fukushima 1st district) (Seiwakai)
- Junji Suzuki (Member of the House of Representatives for Tōkai PR block) (Seiwakai)
- Ryū Shionoya (Member of the House of Representatives for Shizuoka 8th district) (Seiwakai)
- Naomi Tokashiki (Member of the House of Representatives for Osaka 7th district) (Heiseiken)
- Kenji Wakamiya (Member of the House of Representatives for Tokyo 5th district) (Heiseiken)
- Minoru Terada (Member of the House of Representatives for Hiroshima 5th district) (Kōchikai)
- Noriko Miyagawa (Member of the House of Representatives for Southern Kanto PR block) (Ikōkai)
- Hiroshi Moriyama (Member of the House of Representatives for Kagoshima 5th district) (Kinmirai Seiji Kenkyūkai)
- Hiromichi Kumada (Member of the House of Representatives for Aichi 1st district) (Banchōken)
- Keitaro Ohno (Member of the House of Representatives for Kagawa 3rd district) (no faction)
- Ken Saitō (Member of the House of Representatives for Chiba 7th district) (Suigetsukai)
- Yasuhiro Ozato (Member of the House of Representatives for Kagoshima 4th district) (Yūrinkai)
- Takamori Yoshikawa (Member of the House of Representatives for Hokkaido 2nd district) (Shisuikai)
- Emiko Takagai (Member of the House of Councillors from National PR block) (Seiwakai)
- Yuhei Yamashita (Member of the House of Councillors from Saga) (Heiseiken)
- Yoshihiko Isozaki (Member of the House of Councillors from Kagawa) (Kōchikai)
- Yaichi Nakahara (Member of the House of Councillors from Niigata) (Shisuikai)
- Yūsuke Nakanishi (Member of the House of Councillors from Tokushima) (Ikōkai)
- Michiko Ueno (Member of the House of Councillors from Tochigi) (no faction)

Number of recommenders by factions

Candidates	Shinzo Abe
Banchō Seisaku Kenkyūjo	1
Heisei Kenkyūkai	3
Ikōkai	2
Kinmirai Seiji Kenkyūkai	1
Kōchikai	2
Seiwa Seisaku Kenkyūkai	4
Shisuikai	3
Suigetsukai	1
Yūrinkai	1
No faction	2

== Results ==
Abe was re-elected without a vote.
