= Hajime Sasaki =

Japanese politician (born 1974)

- 佐々木 紀
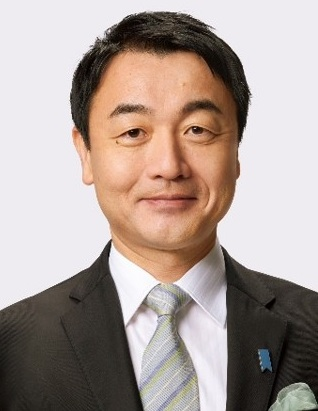
- Official portrait, 2025

Member of the House of Representatives
- Incumbent
- Assumed office 18 December 2012
- Preceded by: Yoshirō Mori
- Constituency: Ishikawa 2nd

Personal details
- Born: 18 October 1974 (age 51) Neagari, Ishikawa, Japan
- Party: Liberal Democratic
- Relatives: Mamoru Sasaki (uncle)
- Education: Tohoku University

Hajime Sasaki (佐々木紀, Sasaki Hajime; born 18 October 1974) is a Japanese politician serving as a member of the House of Representatives since 2012. From 2018 to 2019, he served as director of the LDP Youth Division. He is the nephew of Mamoru Sasaki.
