= Tanzan Ishibashi =

Prime Minister of Japan from 1956 to 1957

- 石橋 湛山
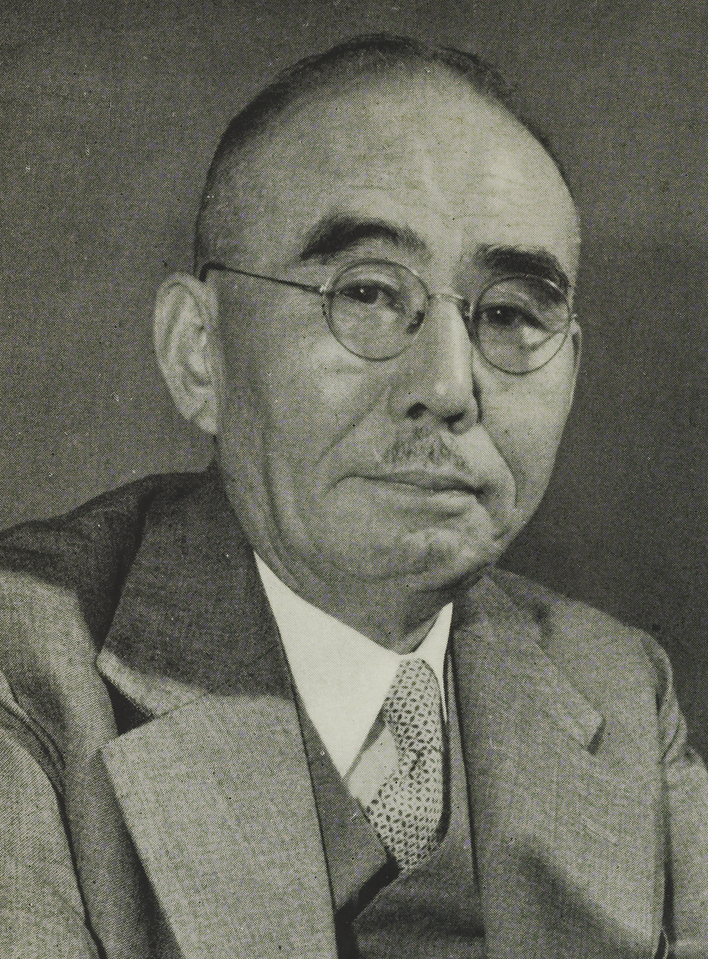
- Official portrait, 1956

Prime Minister of Japan
- In office 23 December 1956 – 25 February 1957
- Monarch: Hirohito
- Preceded by: Ichirō Hatoyama
- Succeeded by: Nobusuke Kishi

President of the Liberal Democratic Party
- In office 14 December 1956 – 21 March 1957
- Vice President: Banboku Ōno
- Secretary-General: Takeo Miki
- Preceded by: Ichirō Hatoyama
- Succeeded by: Nobusuke Kishi
Ministerial offices
Director-General of the Defense Agency
In office 23 December 1956 – 31 January 1957
| Prime Minister | Himself |
| Preceded by | Funada Naka |
| Succeeded by | Nobusuke Kishi |
Minister of Posts and Telecommunications
In office 23 December 1956 – 27 December 1956
| Prime Minister | Himself |
| Preceded by | Isamu Murakami |
| Succeeded by | Taro Hirai |
Minister of International Trade and Industry
In office 10 December 1954 – 23 December 1956
| Prime Minister | Ichirō Hatoyama |
| Preceded by | Kiichi Aichi |
| Succeeded by | Mikio Mizuta |
Minister of Finance
In office 22 May 1946 – 24 May 1947
| Prime Minister | Shigeru Yoshida |
| Preceded by | Keizo Shibusawa |
| Succeeded by | Tetsu Katayama (acting); Shōtarō Yano |

Member of the House of Representatives
- In office 1 October 1952 – 23 October 1963
- Preceded by: Tsurukichi Hatakeyama
- Succeeded by: Yoshiaki Kibe
- Constituency: Shizuoka 2nd
- In office 26 April 1947 – 17 May 1947
- Preceded by: Constituency established
- Succeeded by: Tsurukichi Hatakeyama
- Constituency: Shizuoka 2nd

Member of the Kamakura Town Council
- In office 1924–1928

Personal details
- Born: Seizō Sugita; 25 September 1884 Takanawa, Tokyo, Japan
- Died: 25 April 1973 (aged 88) Tokyo, Japan
- Party: Liberal Democratic (after 1955)
- Other political affiliations: JLP (1945–1948); DLP (1948–1950); LP (1950–1953); LP–H (1953–1954); JDP (1954–1955)
- Spouse: Ume Iwai (m. 1912; died 1971)
- Education: Waseda University
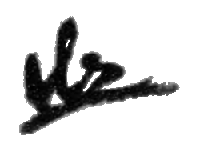
- Signature

Tanzan Ishibashi (石橋 湛山, Ishibashi Tanzan; 25 September 1884 – 25 April 1973) was a Japanese journalist and politician who served as prime minister of Japan from 1956 to 1957.

Born in Tokyo, Ishibashi became a journalist after graduating from Waseda University in 1907. In 1911, he joined the Tōyō Keizai Shimpo ("Eastern Economic Journal") and served as its editor-in-chief from 1925 to 1946 and president from 1941. In the 1930s, Ishibashi was one of the few critics of Japanese imperialism, and became well known as a liberal economist. From 1946 to 1947, Ishibashi served as finance minister under Shigeru Yoshida. He was elected into the National Diet in 1947, but was purged for openly opposing the U.S. occupation policies; he returned to the Diet in 1952, after which he allied with Ichiro Hatoyama and served as his minister of international trade and industry. Ishibashi succeeded Hatoyama as prime minister in 1956, simultaneously serving as director of the Defense Agency, but resigned soon after due to ill health.

== Early life and education ==
Ishibashi was born in the Shibanihonenoki district of Azabu ward, Tokyo in 1884, the eldest son of Sugita Tansei (1856–1931), a Nichiren Buddhist priest and the 81st head of Kuon-ji temple in Yamanashi prefecture. Ishibashi, who took on his mother's surname, would later become a Nichiren priest himself. As a member of the Nichiren-shū sect of Nichiren Buddhism, Tanzan was his Buddhist name; his birth name was Seizō (省三). He studied philosophy and graduated from Waseda University's literature department in 1907.

== Journalistic career ==
He worked as a journalist at the Mainichi Shimbun for a while. After he finished military service, he joined the staff of the Tōyō Keizai Shimpo ("Eastern Economic Journal"), later becoming its editor-in-chief and finally company president in 1941. For the Tōyō Keizai, Ishibashi wrote about Japanese financial policy, developing over time a new liberal perspective.

Ishibashi had a liberal political view and was one of the most consistent proponents of individualism during the Taishō Democracy movement. In this regard, he also promoted a feminist perspective, advocating comprehensive "legal, political, educational, and economic" equality for women so that they could better thrive in the competitive modern society, in contrast to the stratified conditions of feudal life. Ishibashi was also one of the rare personalities who opposed Japanese imperialism. Instead, he advocated a "Small Japan" policy (小日本主義, shō-Nihon-shugi), which advocated the abandonment of Manchuria and Japanese colonies to refocus efforts on Japan's own economic and cultural development. In addition, he allied himself with Tanaka Ōdō in arguing for free trade and international cooperation over militarism and colonialism.

== Political career ==
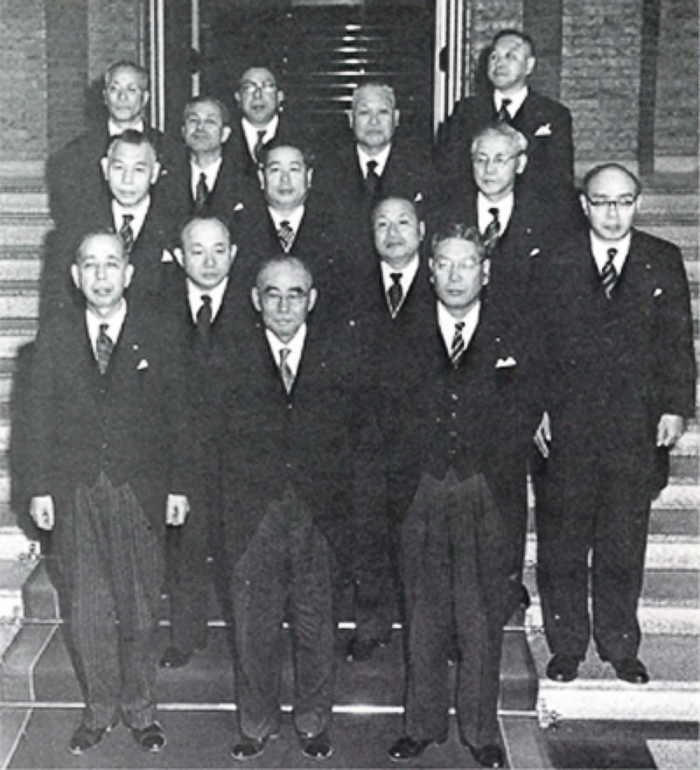
Ishibashi's cabinet (Ishibashi is in the centre, with Nobusuke Kishi to his left, as his Minister for Foreign Affairs, and Hayato Ikeda to his right as his Minister of Finance).

After World War II Ishibashi received an offer from the Japan Socialist Party to run for the National Diet as their candidate. However, Ishibashi declined, and instead accepted a post of "advisor" to the newly formed Liberal Party. Ishibashi then served as Minister of Finance in Shigeru Yoshida's first cabinet from 1946 to 1947. Ishibashi was elected to the Diet for the first time in the April 1947 general election, representing Shizuoka's second district, but less than one month later he was purged and forced to resign for having openly opposed U.S. Occupation policies. Following his de-purging in 1951, Ishibashi allied with Ichirō Hatoyama and joined the movement against Yoshida's cabinet. In 1953, Hatoyama became prime minister, and Ishibashi was appointed Minister of Industry. Around this time, Ishibashi became known as a supporter of revising Article 9 of the Japanese Constitution and remilitarizing Japan. In 1955, the new Liberal Democratic Party (LDP) was established as a combination of smaller conservative parties, with Ishibashi as a founding member.

== Premiership (1956–1957) ==
When Hatoyama retired in 1956, the LDP held a vote for their new president. At first Nobusuke Kishi was considered the most likely candidate, but Ishibashi allied himself with another candidate, Mitsujirō Ishii, and won the election, becoming the new Prime Minister of Japan. In the postwar period, a practice had developed whereby each prime minister would attempt to achieve a major foreign policy objective. Shigeru Yoshida had secured the peace treaty which ended the Occupation, Hatoyama had negotiated the resumption of diplomatic relations with the Soviet Union, and now Ishibashi stated that his main objective would be resuming diplomatic relations with the People's Republic of China. Ishibashi also signaled that he would endeavor to take a cooperative approach to the political opposition, resulting in high public approval ratings. He became sick and resigned two months later, with Kishi taking over as prime minister.

== Post-premiership ==
Even after Ishibashi resigned the posts of prime minister and president of LDP, he remained a powerful faction boss and prominent figure among ex-Liberal Party politicians in the LDP. Ishibashi opposed Kishi's efforts to force through a revised version of the U.S.-Japan Security Treaty in 1960, which he felt were too extreme. When Kishi had opposition lawmakers physically removed from the Diet by police and rammed the new treaty through on 19 May 1960, Ishibashi was one of several LDP faction bosses who boycotted the vote in protest.

Ishibashi also remained a major figure in Japan's ongoing efforts to engage with the People's Republic of China, making a personal visit to China in 1963. From 1952 to 1968 he was also the president of Rissho University. Tanzan Ishibashi died on 24 April 1973.

Waseda University later introduced the Waseda Journalism Award In Memory of Ishibashi Tanzan in 2001.

== Political philosophy, ideology and views ==
Ishibashi's views were based on new liberalism, individualism and feminism. Ishibashi was opposed to Japanese imperialism, colonialism and militarism. Because of his anti-imperalist views he advocated for a "Small Japan" policy (小日本主義, shō-Nihon-shugi), which advocated the abandonment of Manchuria and Japanese colonies to refocus efforts on Japan's own economic and cultural development. In addition to that, he allied with Tanaka Ōdō to support free trade and international cooperation. He also embraced Keynesianism.

== Honors ==
From the corresponding article in the Japanese Wikipedia

- Grand Cordon of the Order of the Rising Sun (29 April 1964)
- Grand Cordon of the Order of the Rising Sun with Paulownia Flowers (25 April 1973; posthumous)

Political offices
| Preceded by Keizo Shibusawa | Minister of Finance; 1946–1947 | Succeeded by Tetsu Katayama; Interim |
| Preceded by Kiichi Aichi | Minister of International Trade and Industry; 1954–1956 | Succeeded by Mikio Mizuta |
| Preceded by Isamu Murakami | Minister of Posts and Telecommunications; 1956 | Succeeded by Taro Hirai |
| Preceded by Ichirō Hatoyama | Prime Minister of Japan; 1956–1957 | Succeeded by Nobusuke Kishi |
Party political offices
| Preceded by Ichirō Hatoyama | President of the Liberal Democratic Party; 1956–1957 | Succeeded by Nobusuke Kishi |
