= Banchō Seisaku Kenkyūjo =

Banchō Seisaku Kenkyūjo 番町政策研究所
- Leader: Defunct, now part of Taro Aso's faction
- Founder: Takeo Miki and Kenzō Matsumura
- Founded: 1956
- Dissolved: 2017
- Preceded by: Kaishintō
- Succeeded by: Shikōkai
- Ideology: Centrism
- Political position: Centre to centre-right
- Type: Liberal Democratic Party faction

Banchō Seisaku Kenkyūjo (Japanese: 番町政策研究所 lit. Banchō Policy Research Institute) was a former faction of the Liberal Democratic Party which formed in 1956 and later merged into the Shikōkai faction in 2017.

Its abbreviation was Banchō-ken (番町研), and its popular nicknames, as with other LDP factions, shifted depending on who was the factional leader at the time.

== History ==
=== Formation ===
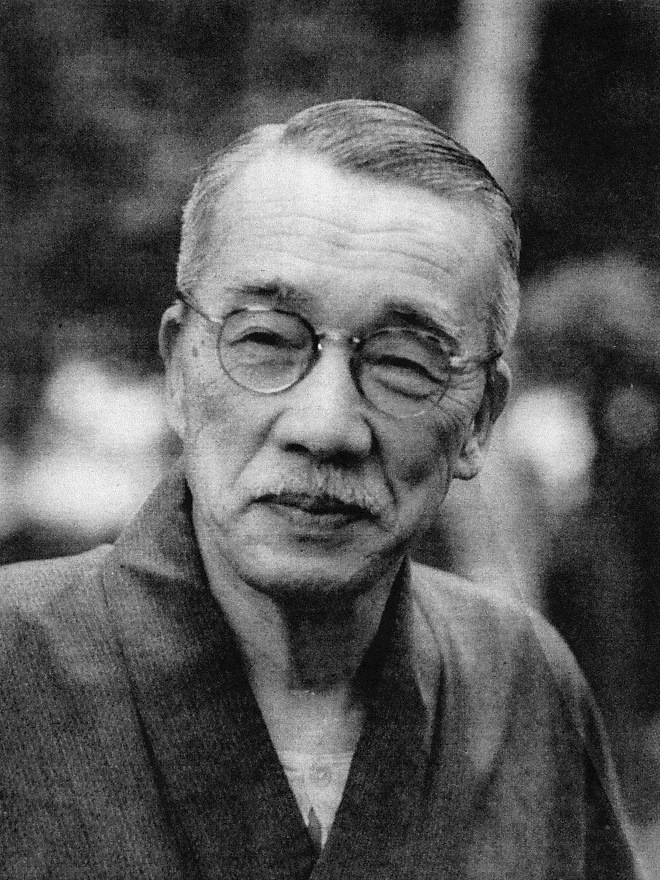
Kenzō Matsumura

The faction's ideas historically descended from the pre-war Constitutional Democratic Party and the centrist post-war National Cooperative Party. The latter group eventually merged into Reformist Party (Kaishintō), headed by Mamoru Shigemitsu. After the Liberal Democratic Party formed in 1955 as a big tent, Kaishintō's descendants within the LDP were a part of the so-called "conservative anti-mainstream" (保守傍流) segment of the party which favoured Ichirō Hatoyama over the "conservative mainstream" (保守本流) side of Shigeru Yoshida.

=== Miki and Matsumura faction era ===
Within the LDP, this faction was considered akin to heretics, as they were further to the left than most of the party. Although they were a small faction with relatively weak influence, their leader Takeo Miki displayed an aggressive style and took advantage of things such as casting votes, resulting in him being labeled a 'Balkan politician'.

Miki, who got his start as the party's secretary general under Prime Minister Tanzan Ishibashi (who considered Miki as his successor), formed the Seisaku Kenkyūkai (Policy Research Society) with Kenzō Matsumura and set out to attract centrist ex-members of the old Kaishintō into their jointly-led faction. In the 1959 LDP leadership election, Matsumura ran against incumbent Prime Minister Nobusuke Kishi, a hardline right-winger who had become Miki's internal party rival despite both having started out as pro-Hatoyama members of the "conservative anti-mainstream." In the end, Matsumura was soundly defeated after Kishi had garnered 320 votes to Matsumura's mere 166.

In 1963, at Miki's discretion, his own faction, which was known as Seisaku Doshikai, voted to disband.

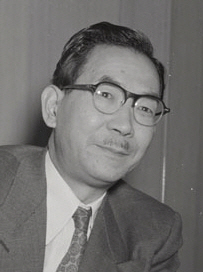
Takeo Miki

Although incumbent Prime Minister Ikeda was re-elected as party president in 1964, he retired soon afterwards due to illness. When discussion arose over who was to succeed him, Miki and Matsumura were forced to take opposing positions, as Miki preferred Eisaku Satō while Matsumura supported Ichiro Kono. As a result, Matsumura and those who agreed with him seceded from the Miki-Matsumura faction and set up their own small faction. Miki became the sole leader of Seisaku Kenkyūkai, and thus it was now called the Miki faction. In 1971, the similarly comparatively left-leaning Futsuka-kai faction of Hirohide Ishida merged into Miki's faction.

Miki had run unsuccessfully in both the 1968 and 1970 LDP presidential elections. By the 1972 election, the so-called Kakufuku War feud between Kakuei Tanaka and Takeo Fukuda was underway, and Miki boldly decided to run once again as a candidate. He finished in last place of the first round of voting, and in the second round he and his faction had decided to support Tanaka, who ended up winning.

Initially there was common ground, such as pursuing the normalisation of relations between China and Japan, Miki and Tanaka came into conflict during the 1974 House of Councillors election after the unofficial Miki faction candidate Kentarō Kujime defeated the officially LDP-endorsed Tanaka faction candidate Masaharu Gotōda in Miki's home prefecture of Tokushima, a debacle that has been dubbed the "Awa War." Soon afterwards, Tanaka resigned from his position as LDP president following accusations of corruption.

Miki, the leader of a perennially minor faction, was unexpectedly propelled to the LDP's leadership in 1974 through the strong endorsement of Etsusaburo Shiina, as he was viewed as a "clean candidate" who could reform the party's image, and he thus became prime minister as a result following internal party discussions.

In 1975, after former Prime Minister Tanaka was accused of being involved in the Lockheed bribery scandals, the Miki faction, supported by the Fukuda and Nakasone factions, set out to actively take action against corruption within the party. This resulted in strong resistance from the other factions that came to be known as the "Down with Miki" (Miki oroshi) movement within the party seeking to have Miki resign as prime minister.

The LDP suffered from "split ticket" voting for the 1976 general election between opposing factions, and a result the party lost its absolute majority of seats for the first time ever. As per usual in Japanese politics, Miki resigned as LDP president to take credit for the losses. The anti-Miki forces favoured Takeo Fukuda as his replacement and thus Miki and his faction were back in the anti-mainstream.

Around the time of the 1976 election, there had been talks of some of Miki's faction members joining the Socialist Citizens League (Shakai Shimin Rengo) of Saburō Eda, which was intended to be a centrist organisation that would include the likes of moderates within the Socialist Party, Komeito, the Democratic Socialist Party, and of course a subset of Miki's faction. Eda's premature death the following year, however, put any such ideas to rest.

In the 1978 LDP leadership election, Toshio Kōmoto ran instead of Miki, although Masayoshi Ōhira had the support of the profoundly influential Tanaka faction and thus secured the leadership position.

After the LDP lost another seat in the 1979 general election, the anti-mainstream factions of Miki, Fukuda, Nakasone, and Nakagawa demanded that Ohira resign from the leadership. This period, known as the "forty-day conflict," was an intense period which saw two LDP candidates go against each other in the House of Representatives, with Ohira winning in the end; he obtained 138 votes over the anti-mainstream unity candidate (former Prime Minister Fukuda)'s 121 votes. While Miki favoured Fukuda, some of his faction members voted for Ohira because they felt Fukuda was too right-wing.

In 1980, the Socialist Party submitted a vote of no confidence against the Ohira administration. It passed by a margin of 56 votes because many members of the Fukuda and Miki faction were absent. Nonetheless, Ohira's sudden death soon thereafter resulted in a large sympathy vote for the LDP and thus electoral victory in the 1980 general election. Despite this, the LDP continued to suffer from internal wounds.

Throughout these ordeals, the Miki and Nakasone factions were known to have thought about seeking to join a different political party, and Miki's faction was approached with an offer by the Democratic Socialist Party.

=== Kōmoto faction era ===
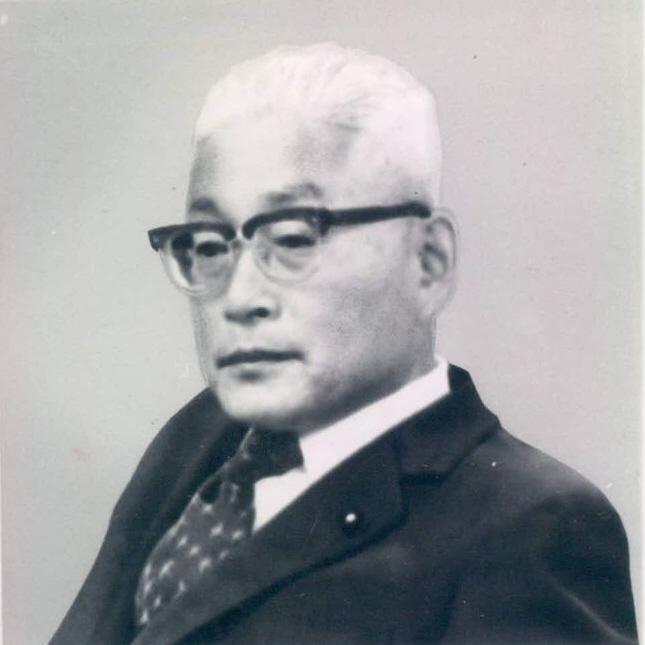
Toshio Kōmoto

In July 1980, the Miki faction disbanded and most of its members joined a new faction, known as the New New Policy Research Society (Shin Seisaku Kenkyūkai), which was led by Toshio Kōmoto.

Since Miki's relations with Tanaka's faction had become strained over time, having a different leader would be more beneficial to his faction members, and thus Miki decided not to participate in this new faction. Komoto had a different quality to him compared to Miki as he had close connections to the business world. Nonetheless, Komoto continued to be associated with Miki within the party.

In 1982, the Komoto and Fukuda factions opposed Prime Minister Zenkō Suzuki, who was supported by the former Tanaka faction as well as the Nakasone faction.

Komoto ran in the 1982 LDP leadership election, but although he obtained second place, Nakasone declined to hold a second round because he had already obtained an absolute majority of the votes, and thus victory for Komoto was virtually impossible anyways. After this, the next few LDP leadership elections were uncontested.

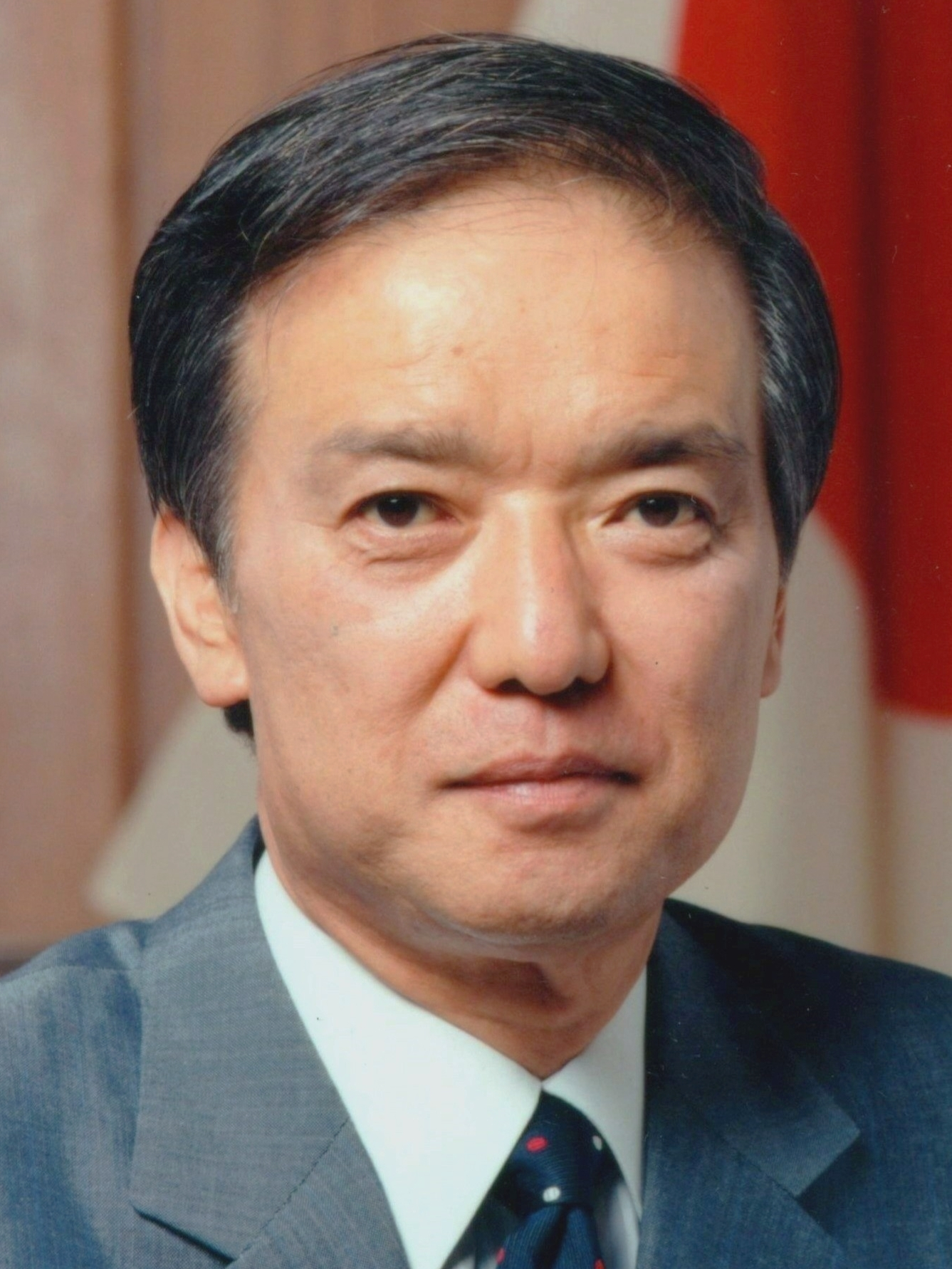
Toshiki Kaifu

In 1989, following the Recruit scandal and subsequent resignations of many high LDP officials as well as historic electoral losses for the LDP, it was thought that Komoto would finally get his shot at becoming prime minister. Komoto couldn't win merely on the strength of his own small faction, and so he decided to endorse Toshiki Kaifu, as he was endorsed by the powerful Takeshita faction. Kaifu, a protégé of Miki and member of Komoto's faction, was seen as a "clean candidate" who could reform the party's image and standing, as with Miki before. Kaifu soundly secured the leadership position and was inaugurated as prime minister in that same year. In the end, Kaifu's attempts did not bear too much fruit and he was forced to resign by 1991.

In 1993, the Komoto faction members Shōichi Ide and Susumu Yanase defected from the LDP to assist in forming New Party Sakigake. Some former Komoto members also took part in forming the Japan Renewal Party and New Frontier Party.

By 1996, the Komoto faction was the smallest faction in the LDP at the Diet level.

=== Komura faction era ===
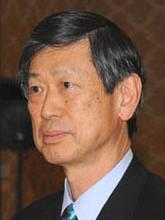
Masahiko Komura

In May 1995, the faction was given its final name of Banchō Seisaku Kenkyūjo, named after the Banchō area in Kioichō, Tokyo, where the faction headquarters were based.

In October 1996, Komoto retired from politics, and then retired from his role as faction chairman in February 1997. He was succeeded by Masahiko Kōmura, although the faction continued to be called the "former Komoto faction" (旧河本派) until Komoto died in 2001.

Seiko Noda, who would later become a candidate in the 2021 LDP leadership election, got her start as the youngest ever government cabinet member in Japanese history at the age of 37 in July 1997 while a member of the former Komoto faction, although she later withdrew from the faction in 2003.

Yūji Yamamoto, who started out in the Komura faction, worked hard to convince other Diet members to support Shinzo Abe in his eventually successful bid for the 2006 LDP leadership election, and also was a part of the First Abe Cabinet. Another faction member, Norihiko Akagi, joined the cabinet soon thereafter, although he was dismissed following allegations of financial misdoings.

In August 2007, faction leader Komura became Minister of Defense, and was moved to the position of Foreign Minister under the Yasuo Fukuda cabinet, before eventually leaving the cabinet when Fukuda resigned. Faction member Tadamori Ōshima also served a lengthy tenure as the LDP's National Diet Committee chairman.

Following the 2009 general election, which was disastrous for the LDP, Oshima briefly left the faction to serve as the LDP's secretary general. The party also moved its headquarters to lower costs.

In 2012, the faction begun discussions to possibly merge into Aso's faction, although there was concern that this would cause the faction to lose its distinction features as well as tarnish the faction's historical image.

In the 2012 LDP leadership election, the Komura faction once again supported Shinzo Abe.

=== Ōshima faction era ===
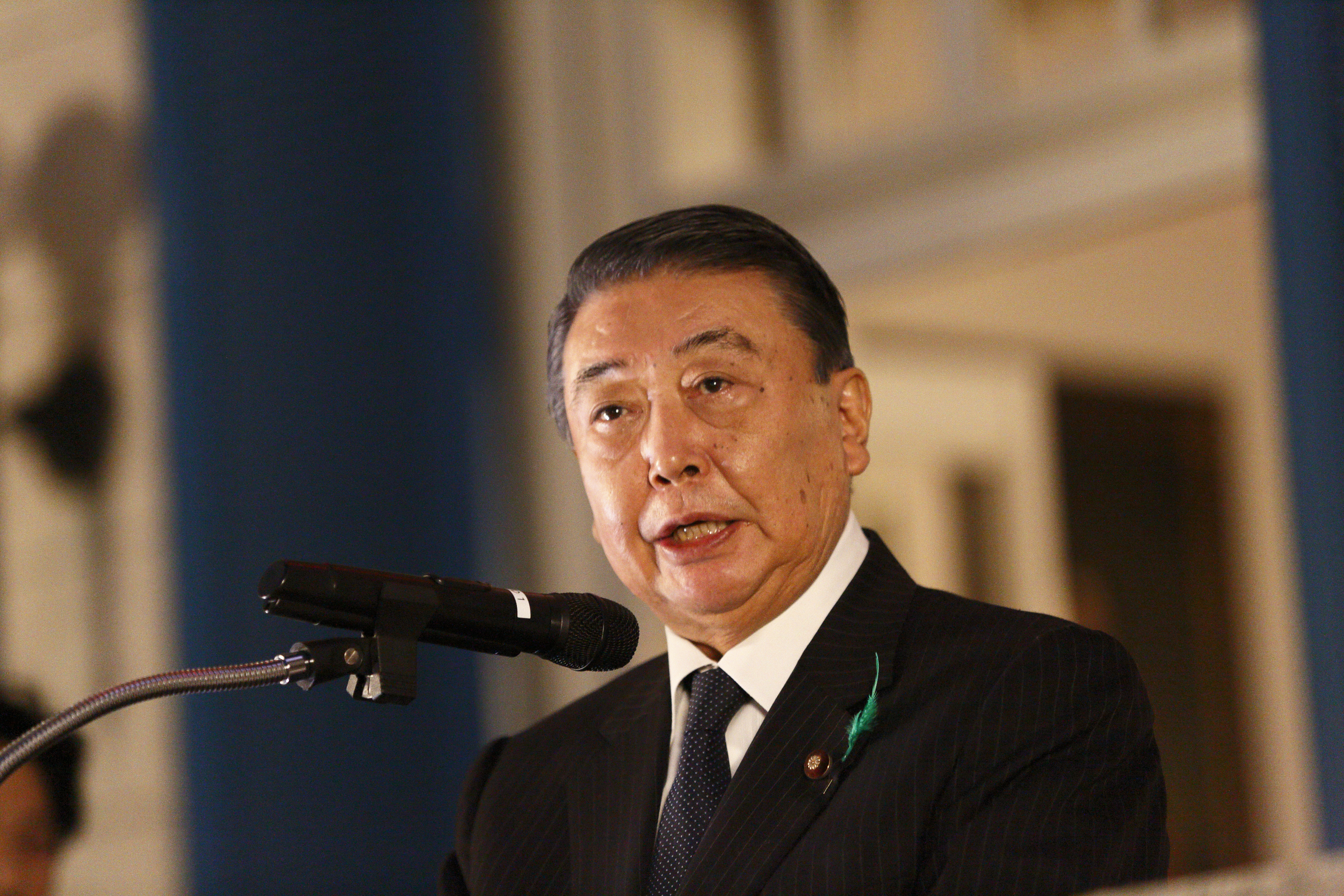
Tadamori Oshima

In October 2012, Komura was replaced by Oshima as leader of the faction, and thus the Oshima faction was then established. For a long period of time after this, Komura still continued to hold an important position as the LDP's vice president.

In April 2015, Oshima left the faction after he was appointed as the Speaker of the House of Representatives.

=== Santō faction era ===
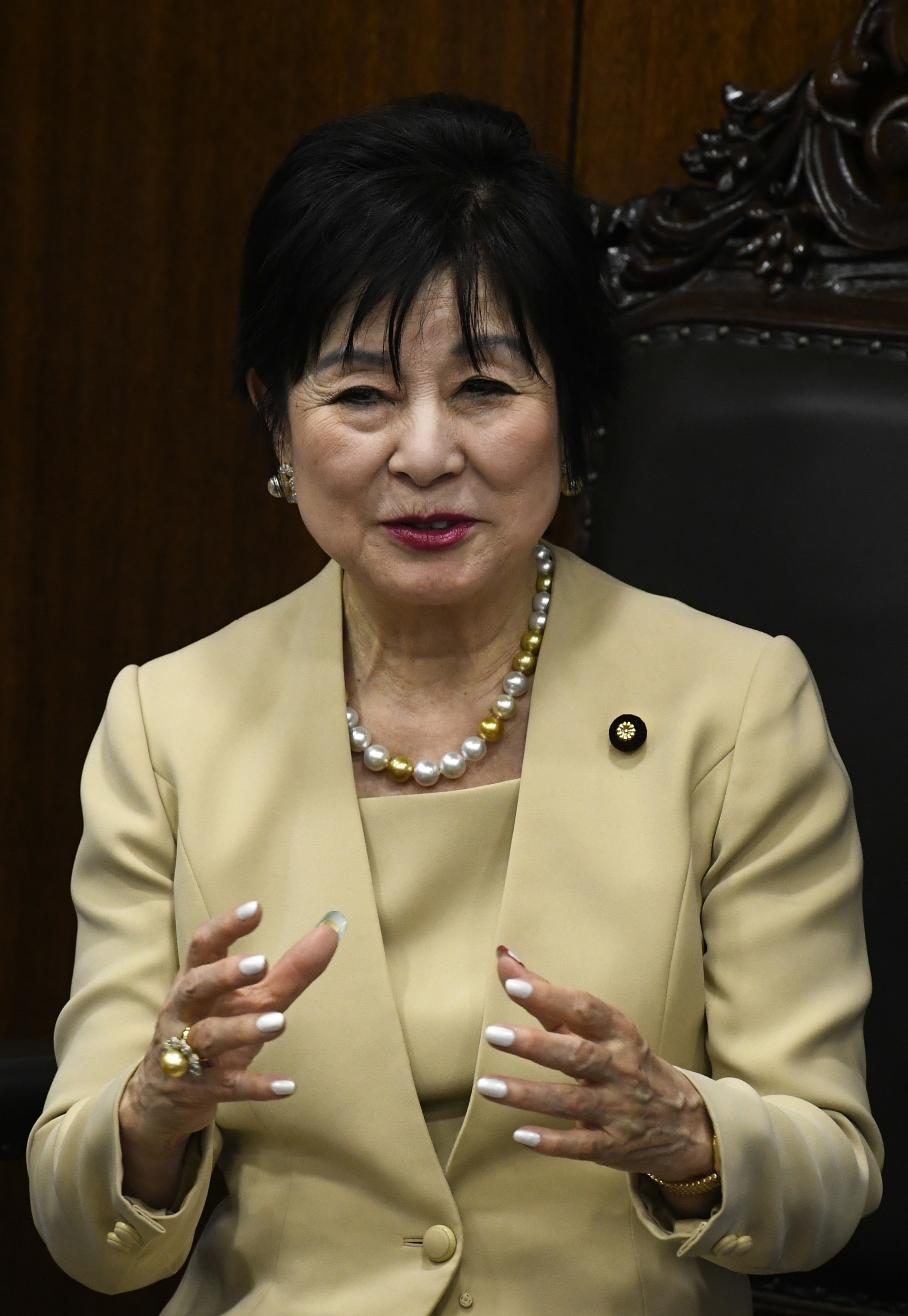
Akiko Santō

Following the resignation of Oshima as chairman, Akiko Santō assumed her role as faction leader. She was the first female faction leader in the LDP's history.

In the 2015 LDP leadership election, Santo predictably supported incumbent Prime Minister Shinzo Abe. There had been talk of Seiko Noda running against Abe, but she was unable to collect the minimum number of recommendations. Santo complimented Noda's enthusiasm but stated that, due to the ongoing discussions about the Legislation for Peace and Security, it was not the time for intraparty conflicts.

On November 13, 2015, Santo once again held discussions with Tarō Asō concerning a possible merger into his faction.

On May 15, 2017, it was finally decided to merge into Aso's faction. It was also decided that some members of the Tengen-kai, the faction led by House of Representatives Steering Committee Chairman Tsutomu Sato, would join the new faction. This resulting faction was expected to overtake the Heisei Kenkyukai, which had previously been a large and prestigious faction that claimed many former prime ministers, to become the second-largest faction in the LDP after the Seiwa Seisaku Kenkyukai, which had been dominant throughout the 21st century. On July 3, the faction joined forces with some members of the Tamekokai and Tengenkai to form the Shikokai. On December 29, the Ministry of Internal Affairs and Communications accepted the dissolution of Banchō Seisaku Kenkyūjo after all of the remaining business was processed.

== Composition at the time of dissolution ==
=== Officials ===
President	Akiko Santo
Vice-President	Shintaro Ito
Secretary General	Akinori Eto
