= Market liberalism =

Political ideology

Market liberalism is used in two distinct ways. In the United States, the term is used as a synonym to classical liberalism. In this sense, market liberalism depicts a political ideology, combining a market economy with personal liberty and human rights in contrast to social liberalism, which combines personal liberty and human rights along with a mixed economy and welfare state.

In Europe and elsewhere, the term market liberalism is often used as a synonym to economic liberalism, depicting a policy supporting the economic aspects of liberalism, without necessarily including the political aspects of liberalism. In some political spheres, market liberalism refers to an economically liberal society that also provides a minimal to moderate-sized welfare state for its citizens.

== See also ==
- Laissez-faire
- Libertarianism in the United States
- Neoliberalism
