= Secretary-General of the Liberal Democratic Party =

Government position in Japan political party

- 自由民主党幹事長
- Logo for the Liberal Democratic Party

- Flag of the Liberal Democratic Party

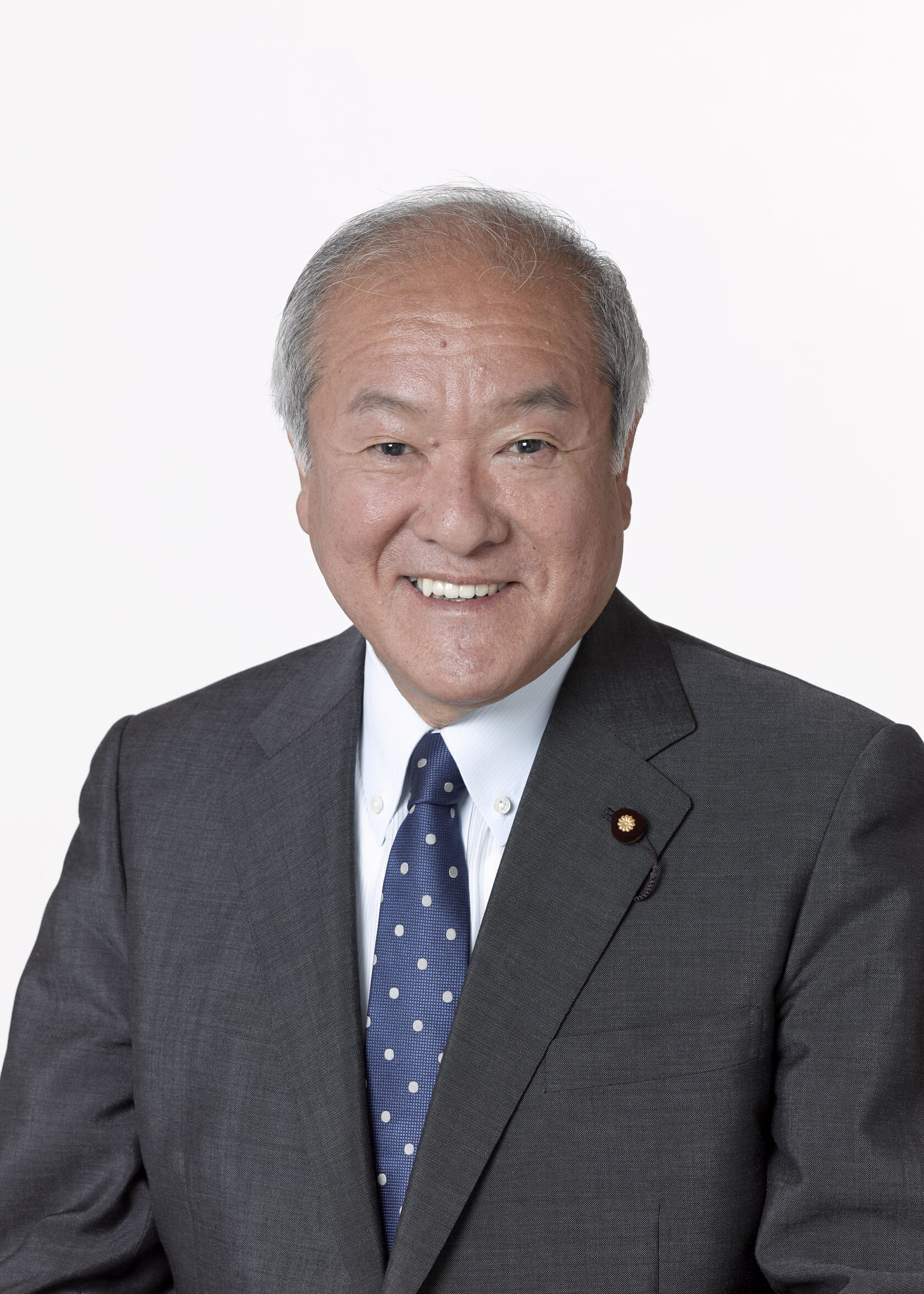
- Incumbent; Shun'ichi Suzuki since 7 October 2025
- Liberal Democratic Party
- Type: Party secretary-general
- Appointer: President
- Inaugural holder: Nobusuke Kishi
- Formation: November 1955
- Deputy: Deputy secretaries-general

The secretary-general of the Liberal Democratic Party (自由民主党幹事長, Jiyū-Minshutō Kanjichō) is a high-ranking position within the Japanese conservative party, the Liberal Democratic Party. According to the LDP constitution, the secretary-general assists the party president in their duties.

As the LDP vice president is a largely ceremonial position, the secretary-general is de facto the second-most-powerful person in the party. The secretary-general is authorized to raise political donations and controls the party finances, resources for elections and managing and advising the party leader on the distribution of appointments. The secretary-general also mobilizes resources for elections and holds the final authority over the list of LDP-backed candidates for the National Diet elections. The secretary-general oversees the LDP Diet Affairs Committee, responsible for steering party-supported bills through both chambers of the Diet, and appoints its chairman. The secretary-general also oversees key LDP organizations such as the personnel, treasury, information research and international bureaus.

The secretary-general is appointed by the president after the formal approval of the LDP General Council. The secretary-general is assisted by up to 30 deputy secretaries-general, appointed by the secretary-general with the approval of the General Council, one of whom is appointed as the acting secretary-general. The current secretary-general is Shun'ichi Suzuki, appointed on 7 October 2025.

== List of officeholders ==
No.	President (birth–death)	Portrait	Constituency or title	Took office	Left office	President
1	Nobusuke Kishi (1896–1987)		Rep for Yamaguchi 1st	November 1955	December 1956	Ichirō Hatoyama
2	Takeo Miki (1907–1988)		Rep for Tokushima At-large	December 1956	July 1957	Tanzan Ishibashi
2	Takeo Miki (1907–1988)		Rep for Tokushima At-large	December 1956	July 1957	Nobusuke Kishi
3	Shojiro Kawashima (1890–1970)		Rep for Chiba 1st	July 1957	January 1959	Nobusuke Kishi
4	Takeo Fukuda (1905–1995)		Rep for Gunma 3rd	January 1959	June 1959	Nobusuke Kishi
5	Shojiro Kawashima (1890–1970)		Rep for Chiba 1st	June 1959	July 1960	Nobusuke Kishi
5	Shūji Masutani (1888–1973)		Rep for Ishikawa 2nd	July 1960	July 1961	Hayato Ikeda
6	Shigesaburō Maeo (1905–1981)		Rep for Kyoto 2nd	July 1961	July 1964	Hayato Ikeda
7	Takeo Miki (1907–1988)		Rep for Tokushima At-large	July 1964	June 1965	Hayato Ikeda
7	Takeo Miki (1907–1988)		Rep for Tokushima At-large	July 1964	June 1965	Eisaku Satō
8	Kakuei Tanaka (1918–1993)		Rep for Niigata 3rd	June 1965	December 1966	Eisaku Satō
9	Takeo Fukuda (1905–1995)		Rep for Gunma 3rd	December 1966	November 1968	Eisaku Satō
10	Kakuei Tanaka (1918–1993)		Rep for Niigata 3rd	November 1968	June 1971	Eisaku Satō
11	Shigeru Hori (1901–1979)		Rep for Saga At-large	June 1971	July 1972	Eisaku Satō
12	Tomisaburo Hashimoto (1901–1990)		Rep for Ibaraki 1st	July 1972	November 1974	Kakuei Tanaka
13	Susumu Nikaidō (1909–2000)		Rep for Kagoshima 3rd	November 1974	December 1974	Kakuei Tanaka
14	Yasuhiro Nakasone (1918–2019)		Rep for Gunma 3rd	December 1974	September 1976	Takeo Miki
15	Tsuneo Uchida (1907–1977)		Rep for Yamanashi At-large	September 1976	December 1976	Takeo Miki
16	Masayoshi Ōhira (1910–1980)		Rep for Kagawa 2nd	December 1976	December 1978	Takeo Fukuda
17	Kunikichi Saito (1909–1992)		Rep for Fukushima 3rd	December 1978	November 1979	Masayoshi Ōhira
18	Yoshio Sakurauchi (1912–2003)		Rep for Shimane At-Large	November 1979	November 1981	Masayoshi Ōhira
18	Yoshio Sakurauchi (1912–2003)		Rep for Shimane At-Large	November 1979	November 1981	Zenkō Suzuki
19	Susumu Nikaidō (1909–2000)		Rep for Kagoshima 3rd	November 1981	December 1983	Zenkō Suzuki
19	Susumu Nikaidō (1909–2000)		Rep for Kagoshima 3rd	November 1981	December 1983	Yasuhiro Nakasone
20	Rokusuke Tanaka (1923–1985)		Rep for Fukuoka 4th	December 1983	October 1984	Yasuhiro Nakasone
21	Shin Kanemaru (1914–1996)		Rep for Yamanashi At-large	October 1984	July 1986	Yasuhiro Nakasone
22	Noboru Takeshita (1924–2000)		Rep for Shimane At-large	July 1986	October 1987	Yasuhiro Nakasone
23	Shintaro Abe (1924–1991)		Rep for Yamaguchi 1st	October 1987	June 1989	Noboru Takeshita
24	Ryutaro Hashimoto (1937–2006)		Rep for Okayama 4th	June 1989	August 1989	Sōsuke Uno
25	Ichirō Ozawa (b. 1957)		Rep for Iwate 2nd	August 1989	April 1991	Toshiki Kaifu
26	Keizō Obuchi (1937–2000)		Rep for Gunma 5th	April 1991	October 1991	Toshiki Kaifu
27	Tamisuke Watanuki (1927-2026)		Rep for Toyama 2nd	October 1991	December 1992	Kiichi Miyazawa
28	Seiroku Kajiyama (1926–2000)		Rep for Ibaraki 2nd	December 1992	July 1993	Kiichi Miyazawa
29	Yoshirō Mori (b. 1937)		Rep for Ishikawa 2nd	July 1993	August 1995	Yōhei Kōno
30	Hiroshi Mitsuzuka (1927–2004)		Rep for Miyagi 3rd	August 1995	October 1995	Yōhei Kōno
31	Koichi Kato (1939–2016)		Rep for Yamagata 3rd	October 1995	July 1998	Ryutaro Hashimoto
32	Yoshirō Mori (b. 1937)		Rep for Ishikawa 2nd	July 1998	April 2000	Keizō Obuchi
33	Hiromu Nonaka (1925–2018)		Rep for Kyoto 4th	April 2000	December 2000	Yoshirō Mori
34	Makoto Koga (b. 1940)		Rep for Fukuoka 7th	December 2000	April 2001	Yoshirō Mori
35	Taku Yamasaki (b. 1936)		Rep for Fukuoka 2nd	April 2001	September 2003	Junichiro Koizumi
36	Shinzo Abe (1954–2022)		Rep for Yamaguchi 4th	22 September 2003	24 September 2004	Junichiro Koizumi
37	Tsutomu Takebe (b. 1941)		Rep for Hokkaido 12th	September 2004	September 2006	Junichiro Koizumi
38	Hidenao Nakagawa (b. 1944)		Rep for Hiroshima 4th	September 2006	August 2007	Shinzo Abe
39	Tarō Asō (b. 1940)		Rep for Fukuoka 8th	August 2007	September 2007	Shinzo Abe
40	Bunmei Ibuki (b. 1938)		Rep for Kyoto 1st	September 2007	August 2008	Yasuo Fukuda
41	Tarō Asō (b. 1940)		Rep for Fukuoka 8th	August 2008	September 2008	Yasuo Fukuda
42	Hiroyuki Hosoda (1944-2023)		Rep for Shimane 1st	22 September 2008	29 September 2009	Tarō Asō
43	Tadamori Ōshima (b. 1946)		Rep for Aomori 3rd	September 2009	September 2010	Sadakazu Tanigaki
44	Nobuteru Ishihara (b. 1957)		Rep for Tokyo 8th	September 2010	September 2012	Sadakazu Tanigaki
45	Shigeru Ishiba (b. 1957)		Rep for Tottori 1st	26 September 2012	3 September 2014	Shinzo Abe
46	Sadakazu Tanigaki (b. 1945)		Rep for Kyoto 5th	3 September 2014	3 August 2016	Shinzo Abe
47	Toshihiro Nikai (b. 1939)		Rep for Wakayama 3rd	4 August 2016	1 October 2021	Shinzo Abe
47	Toshihiro Nikai (b. 1939)		Rep for Wakayama 3rd	4 August 2016	1 October 2021	Yoshihide Suga
48	Akira Amari (b. 1949)		Rep for Kanagawa 13th	1 October 2021	4 November 2021	Fumio Kishida
49	Toshimitsu Motegi (b. 1955)		Rep for Tochigi 5th	4 November 2021	30 September 2024	Fumio Kishida
50	Hiroshi Moriyama (b. 1945)		Rep for Kagoshima 4th	30 September 2024	7 October 2025	Shigeru Ishiba
51	Shun'ichi Suzuki (b. 1953)		Rep for Iwate 2nd	7 October 2025	Incumbent	Sanae Takaichi
