= Vice President of the Liberal Democratic Party (Japan) =

Deputy to the party president

- 自由民主党副総裁
- Logo for the Liberal Democratic Party

- Flag of the Liberal Democratic Party

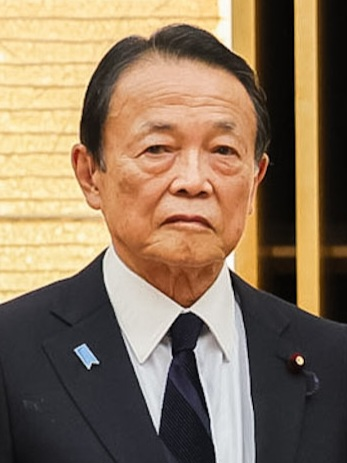
- Incumbent; Tarō Asō since 7 October 2025
- Liberal Democratic Party
- Appointer: President of the Liberal Democratic Party
- Inaugural holder: Banboku Ōno
- Formation: 1955

The vice president of the Liberal Democratic Party (自由民主党副総裁, Jiyū-Minshutō Fuku Sōsai) is a high-ranking member within the Liberal Democratic Party (LDP) and the deputy to the party president.

The vice president is appointed by the president and approved by the LDP Convention. According to the LDP constitution, the vice president assists the president in their duties and acts on their behalf in the event the president cannot fulfill their duties or if the office becomes vacant. The vice president is considered to be a mostly ceremonial role, and has been called by The Japan Times as an effectively being a "pre-retirement job for elder statesmen". The current vice president is former Prime Minister Taro Aso, appointed on 7 October 2025.

== List of officeholders ==
No.	President (birth–death)	Portrait	Took office	Left office
-	Office not in use		April 1956	July 1957
1	Banboku Ōno (1890–1964)		July 1957	July 1960
-	Office not in use		July 1960	July 1961
2	Banboku Ōno (1890–1964)		July 1961	May 1964
3	Shojiro Kawashima (1890–1970)		July 1964	December 1966
-	Office not in use		December 1966	November 1967
4	Shojiro Kawashima (1890–1970)		November 1967	November 1970
-	Office not in use		November 1970	August 1972
5	Etsusaburo Shiina (1898–1979)		August 1972	December 1976
-	Office not in use		December 1976	November 1977
6	Funada Naka (1895–1979)		November 1977	December 1978
7	Eiichi Nishimura (1897–1987)		January 1979	November 1980
-	Office not in use		November 1980	April 1984
8	Susumu Nikaidō (1909–2000)		April 1984	July 1986
-	Office not in use		July 1986	January 1992
9	Shin Kanemaru (1914–1996)		January 1992	August 1992
-	Office not in use		August 1992	July 1994
10	Keizō Obuchi (1937–2000)		July 1994	October 1995
-	Office not in use		October 1995	September 2003
11	Taku Yamasaki (b. 1936)		September 2003	November 2003
-	Office not in use		November 2003	September 2010
12	Tadamori Ōshima (b. 1946)		September 2010	September 2012
13	Masahiko Kōmura (b. 1942)		September 2012	October 2018
-	Office not in use		October 2018	8 October 2021
14	Tarō Asō (b. 1940)		8 October 2021	27 September 2024
15	Yoshihide Suga (b. 1948)		30 September 2024	7 October 2025
16 (14)	Tarō Asō (b. 1940)		7 October 2025	Incumbent
