= Kōchikai =

Political party faction in Japan

Kōchikai 宏池会
- Leader: Fumio Kishida (last)
- Founder: Hayato Ikeda
- Founded: 1957
- Dissolved: 23 January 2024
- Ideology: Moderate conservatism; Hayato Ikeda: Economic liberalism; Free-market liberalism; Keynesianism; Before 1980s: Free-market liberalism Keynesianism; From 1980s: Keynesianism
- Political position: Centre-right
- Type: Liberal Democratic Party faction

Website
- kouchikai1957.com
- Politics of Japan; Political parties; Elections; A: Centre-right in international context, but voters in Japan perceived the faction as centrist.

Kōchikai (宏池会; "Broad Pond Society") was a leading faction within Japan's Liberal Democratic Party (LDP), founded by bureaucrat-turned-politician Hayato Ikeda in 1957. The faction has produced five prime ministers (Ikeda, Masayoshi Ōhira, Zenkō Suzuki, Kiichi Miyazawa, and Fumio Kishida), two LDP presidents (Yōhei Kōno and Sadakazu Tanigaki), and a large number of cabinet officeholders. The faction was officially dissolved on January 23, 2024, after Prime Minister Fumio Kishida pledged to dissolve the faction in the aftermath of a political funds scandal. However, former faction members still meet frequently as a group, exchange information, and collectively exert pressure on other politicians.

== History ==
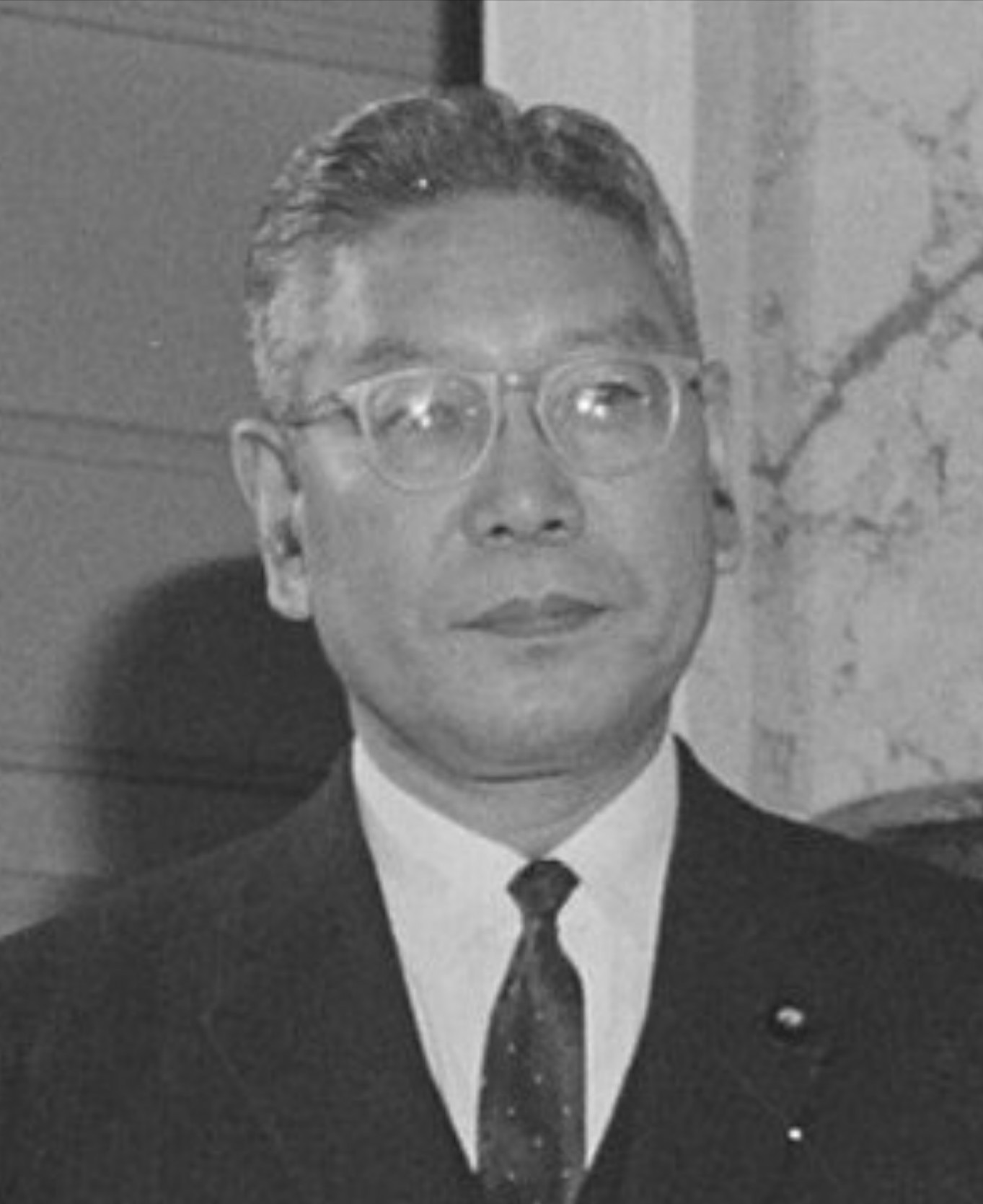
Hayato Ikeda

Kōchikai was founded in 1957 by Hayato Ikeda as he prepared to contest against his rivals for Liberal Democratic Party leadership and the premiership itself. Originally, it was modeled on a think tank, and was initially called the "Kōchikai Policy Study Group" (宏池会政策研究会). The name Kōchikai ("Broad Pond Society") was given to the group by right-wing power broker Masahiro Yasuoka, and was taken from a line from the Eastern Han dynasty poet Ma Rong: "Let's go lie in the pavilion on the hill, and gaze at the broad pond." It was also a pun on Ikeda's surname, which means "rice field by the pond."

Early members of the group tended to be bureaucrats or ex-bureaucrats drawn from the ranks of government ministries and included, in addition to Ikeda himself, Masayoshi Ōhira, Shigesaburō Maeo, Osamu Shimomura, Zentarō Kosaka, and Kiichi Miyazawa. In the early years, the group was nicknamed Ikeda's "brain trust" (burēn), and played a key role in formulating the Income Doubling Plan that propelled Ikeda to electoral victory in the 1960 general election and two terms as prime minister. During the Ikeda years, Kōchikai published policy papers by group members in the group's monthly in-house journal The Way Forward (進路, Shinro).

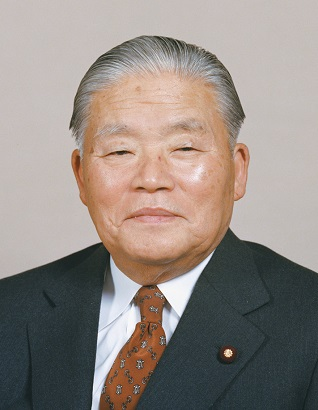
Masayoshi Ōhira

Following Ikeda's death in 1965, headship of the faction passed to Maeo, but as Eisaku Satō won four consecutive terms as prime minister, younger members of the faction became dissatisfied with Maeo's leadership and finally voted him out in favor of Ōhira, in what became known as the "Ōhira coup" of 1971. Under Ōhira's adroit leadership, the faction grew rapidly. As Ōhira recruited new members, the percentage of Kōchikai members who were ex-bureaucrats gradually declined, reaching a new low of only 40 percent of the faction in 1979, and continuing to decline thereafter.

Zenkō Suzuki

Ōhira's sudden death in 1980, while still in office as prime minister, left both headship of Kōchikai and the premiership itself in the hands of faction member Zenkō Suzuki. Suzuki declined to run for reelection as LDP party head in 1982, ending his stint as prime minister, but remained head of the Kōchikai faction until 1986, at which time he relinquished headship to Miyazawa as part of a broader strategic effort to unseat prime minister Yasuhiro Nakasone.

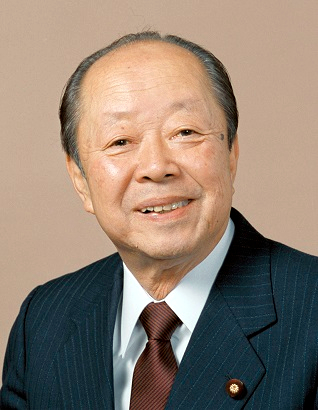
Kiichi Miyazawa

Miyazawa was powerful enough to become prime minister in 1991, but his policy objectives were consistently thwarted by a rival LDP faction led by Noboru Takeshita, until finally a schism within the Takeshita faction brought down Miyazawa's government and handed power to the opposition parties in 1993. However, Miyazawa remained head of Kōchikai, and in 1994 helped engineer the LDP's return to power after a brief interregnum. This made Kōchikai powerful enough to have Kōchikai member Yōhei Kōno elected LDP party president. However, in 1998, a fierce battle broke out between Kōno and fellow Kōchikai member Koichi Kato over who would succeed Miyazawa as head of Kōchikai, in what became known as the "KK War." Both men undermined each other, and although Katō ultimately "won" the war to become Kōchikai head, he became the first head of Kōchikai since Maeo not to become prime minister, and Kōno became the first LDP president ever not to become prime minister.

The chaos caused by the vicious KK War and later schisms left Kōchikai weakened under the next two faction heads, Mitsuo Horiuchi (2001–2006) and Makoto Koga (2006–2012). However, the faction still remained powerful enough to play a kingmaker role by throwing its support to one candidate or another. For example, when Shinzō Abe resigned from his first stint as prime minister in 2007, Kōchikai's support proved decisive in handing the premiership to Yasuo Fukuda instead of heavy favorite Tarō Asō.

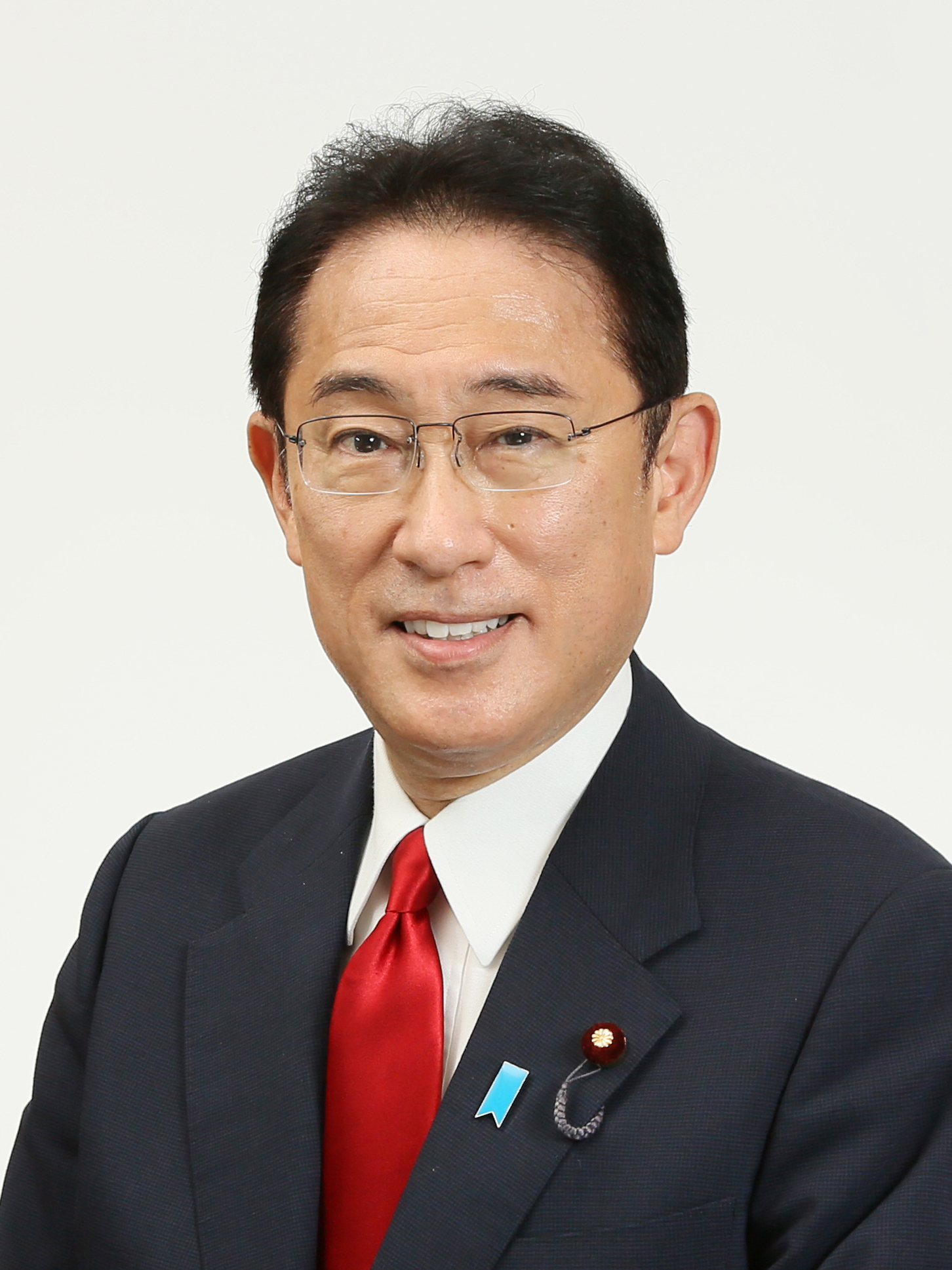
Fumio Kishida

Kōchikai's fortunes began to revive under Koga's handpicked successor, Fumio Kishida, a party deep insider whose father and grandfather had both served in the Diet and who had held a series of cabinet posts in both Abe administrations and the Fukuda administration. A moderate who could win support from across the party, Kishida defeated maverick lawmaker Taro Kono in the party presidential election in September 2021. In December 2023, in light of a growing political funds scandal within the LDP, Kishida resigned as the head of Kōchikai and announced he will leave the faction while he serves as premier. The faction officially disbanded on January 23, 2024. However, former faction members "remain tight-knit," still meet frequently as a group, exchange information, and collectively exert pressure on other politicians.

== Political stance ==
By the political criteria of the LDP, which has embraced neoliberalism since the 1980s, Kōchikai was classified as one of the factions supporting welfare-friendly policies, in contrast to the economically liberal Seiwa Seisaku Kenkyūkai. However, before the 1980s, Kōchikai's leading politicians supported free-market liberalism within the LDP.

One of the most moderate factions within the LDP, the Kōchikai faction typically supported a dovish foreign policy, including diplomatic engagement, preservation of Article 9 of the Japanese Constitution forbidding Japan from having a military, and close relations with the United States. In terms of domestic policy, Kōchikai tended to support moderate efforts to combat income inequality and expand or strengthen the social safety net in ways consistent with fostering economic growth. Among the interest groups in the LDP's base, the Kōchikai faction tended to draw support from government bureaucrats, big business organizations, white-collar workers and other urban professionals, and small business owners.

Kōchikai supported "modified capitalism" (a conservative form of Keynesian economic policy), and unlike other LDP factions, has a weak socially conservative nature. Leaders of Kochikai have described themselves as liberal. However, Kōchikai's politicians remained socially conservative on some issues, including LGBT rights.

== Kōchikai faction heads ==
Faction heads who became prime minister are in bold.

No.	Image	Faction head	Years
1		**Hayato Ikeda**	1957–1965
2		Shigesaburō Maeo	1965–1971
3		**Masayoshi Ōhira**	1971–1980
4		**Zenkō Suzuki**	1980–1986
5		**Kiichi Miyazawa**	1986–1998
6		Kōichi Katō	1998–2001
7		Mitsuo Horiuchi	2001–2006
8		Makoto Koga	2006–2012
9		**Fumio Kishida**	2012–2024
Faction dissolved

== See also ==
- The Asahi Shimbun
- Republican Governance Group - moderate faction of the Republican Party in the United States
