= Taku Yamasaki =

Japanese politician (born 1936)

- 山﨑 拓
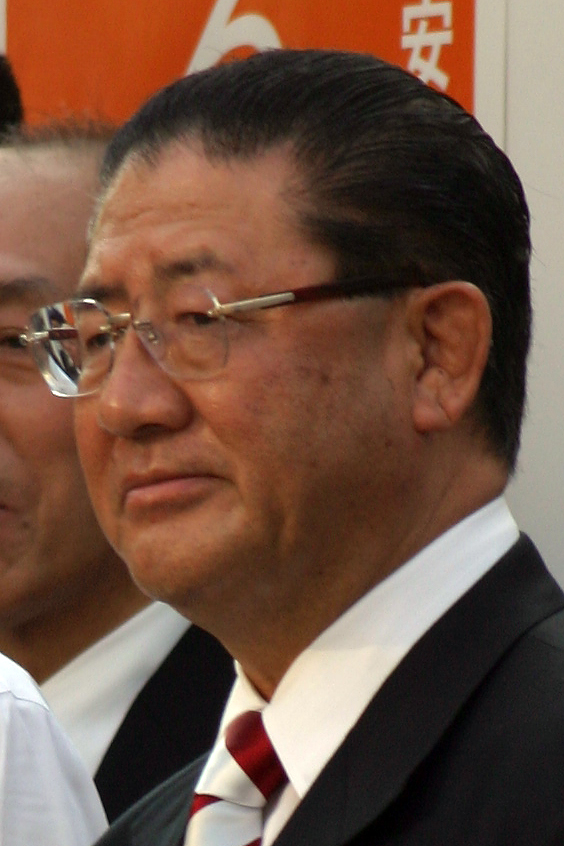
- Yamasaki in 2005

Vice President of the Liberal Democratic Party
- In office 21 September 2003 – 9 November 2003
- President: Junichiro Koizumi
- Preceded by: Keizō Obuchi (1995)
- Succeeded by: Tadamori Ōshima (2010)

Secretary-General of the Liberal Democratic Party
- In office 24 April 2001 – 21 September 2003
- President: Junichiro Koizumi
- Secretary-General: Shinzo Abe
- Preceded by: Makoto Koga
- Succeeded by: Shinzo Abe

Minister of Construction
- In office 5 November 1991 – 12 December 1992
- Prime Minister: Kiichi Miyazawa
- Preceded by: Yūji Ōtsuka
- Succeeded by: Kishirō Nakamura

Director-General of the Japan Defense Agency
- In office 3 June 1989 – 10 August 1989
- Prime Minister: Sōsuke Uno
- Preceded by: Kichirō Tazawa
- Succeeded by: Jūrō Matsumoto

Deputy Chief Cabinet Secretary (Political affairs)
- In office 1 November 1984 – 28 December 1985
- Prime Minister: Yasuhiro Nakasone
- Preceded by: Toyohiko Mizuhira
- Succeeded by: Shunjirō Karasawa

Member of the House of Representatives
- In office 24 April 2005 – 21 July 2009
- Preceded by: Junichiro Koga
- Succeeded by: Shūji Inatomi
- Constituency: Fukuoka 2nd
- In office 10 December 1972 – 10 October 2003
- Preceded by: Kazuma Shintō
- Succeeded by: Junichiro Koga
- Constituency: Fukuoka 1st (1972–1996); Fukuoka 2nd (1996–2003)

Member of the Fukuoka Prefectural Assembly
- In office 23 April 1967 – 7 December 1969
- Constituency: Fukuoka City Sawara Ward

Personal details
- Born: 11 December 1936 (age 89) Dalian, Kwantung, Manchukuo
- Party: Liberal Democratic
- Education: Waseda University

Taku Yamasaki (山崎 拓, Yamasaki Taku; born 11 December 1936) is a retired Japanese politician who served in the House of Representatives from 1972 to 2003 and from 2005 to 2009. He directed the Director General of the Japan Defense Agency for two months in 1989, and served as Minister of Construction from 1991 to 1992. He was a prominent faction leader in the Liberal Democratic Party (LDP) during the late 1990s and early 2000s, and served as its Secretary-General and Vice President under Prime Minister Junichiro Koizumi.

== Early life ==
Yamasaki was born in Dalian (then part of Manchukuo) during World War II. His family moved to Fukuoka following the end of the war. He lost his vision in one eye while in the third grade. He graduated from Waseda University in 1959 with a degree in commerce, and worked at Bridgestone for five years before entering politics.

Yamasaki was elected to the Fukuoka prefectural assembly in 1967, where he was discovered by future Prime Minister Yasuhiro Nakasone. Nakasone persuaded Yamasaki to run in the 1969 general election. Yamasaki was defeated in his first attempt to enter the Diet, but was successful in the 1972 general election.

== Diet career ==
While a Diet member, he served as Minister of Construction, and Director General of the Defense Agency. Yamasaki was an advocate of fiscal stimulus in the late 1990s, as Japan encountered a period of economic stagnation. As head of the LDP Policy Research Council, he advocated investing government-controlled postal savings and insurance funds into the stock market, and an escalation in government spending on telecommunications, environmental and education projects.

Yamasaki was implicated in a fundraising scandal in 1997, when an oil wholesaler accused of income tax evasion and fraud testified before a Diet committee that he had given Yamasaki 278 million yen in political donations, most of which was destined for other candidates.

He was a member of the "YKK" faction with Kōichi Katō and Jun'ichirō Koizumi, and also led a small faction that bore his name. He sought to oust the incumbent prime minister Keizō Obuchi in the LDP presidential election of 1999, but placed third among three candidates (Obuchi 350, Katō 113, Yamasaki 51). Obuchi attributed his victory to the support of Yoshirō Mori, who succeeded Obuchi as Prime Minister following Obuchi's stroke and coma in early 2000. In November 2000, along with Katō, Yamasaki was heavily involved in a failed no confidence motion against Prime Minister Mori.

Koizumi was elected president of the LDP in 2001, and named Yamasaki to serve as its Secretary-General, the second most powerful leader in the party. Yamasaki was a vocal supporter of Koizumi's reform efforts, which targeted the LDP's traditional pork barrel constituencies.

Despite his prominence in the national party, Yamasaki faced close battles in his district in the 1996 election and the 2000 election. His district in urban Fukuoka Prefecture, with an electorate that frequently moved in and out of the region for work, was a favorable battleground for opposition candidates.

=== Scandals and electoral defeat ===
In September 2002, Yamasaki's fundraising office was reported to have passed donations from construction companies to Yasushi Kaneko, an independent lawmaker supporting the Kawabe Dam project in Kumamoto Prefecture. In April 2003, Kanako Yamada alleged before a press conference of over 100 reporters that she had been "Yamasaki's mistress for a decade," and stated that Yamasaki "never regards women as human beings." Yamasaki attempted to stop Yamada through a defamation lawsuit, but one of his lawsuits was rejected on the basis that the story was true. Following the Yamada revelations, Yamasaki became Vice President of the LDP, and was replaced as Secretary-General by Shinzo Abe.

In the November 2003 election, Yamasaki was defeated by Jun'ichirō Koga of the Democratic Party, and subsequently resigned from the vice-presidency of the LDP. Koga himself then encountered a scandal due to revelations that he had misrepresented his academic background. Yamasaki considered running in the 2004 House of Councillors election, but decided to keep his sights on returning to his previous constituency in the next election.

=== Final term in House of Representatives ===
Koga resigned in September 2004, and Yamasaki declared his candidacy for the by-election held in April 2005. Yamasaki won the by-election with support from Prime Minister Koizumi, who visited Fukuoka twice to campaign for Yamasaki.

Yamasaki, Shinzō Abe, and Foreign Minister Tarō Asō were all considered candidates to replace Koizumi after Koizumi's term expired in September 2006. Abe was elected Prime Minister on 26 September 2006.

In the run-up to the 2009 general election, Yamasaki and Kato considered forming a new party to challenge the beleaguered LDP, and had discussions with both Shizuka Kamei and Ichiro Ozawa. Yamasaki remained with the LDP, and was defeated as the LDP suffered a crushing loss nationally. He was unable to run as a PR list candidate in the 2010 House of Councillors election due to LDP retirement age rules, and opted not to run into the 2012 general election, announcing his retirement from politics.

=== Post-retirement ===
Yamasaki made a joint appearance with Shizuka Kamei (former PNP leader), Hirohisa Fujii (former DPJ deputy president) and Masayoshi Takemura (former New Party Sakigake leader) in 2015 to express opposition to the security legislation proposed by the Abe government.

Political offices
Preceded by Toyohiko Mizuhira	Deputy Chief Cabinet Secretary; 1984–1985	Succeeded by Shunjirō Karasawa
Preceded by Kichirō Tazawa	Director-General of the Japan Defense Agency; 1989	Succeeded by Jūrō Matsumoto
Preceded by Yūji Ōtsuka	Minister of Construction; 1991–1992	Succeeded by Kishirō Nakamura
House of Representatives (Japan)
Preceded by Saburō Toida	Chair, Committee on Social and Labour Affairs of the House of Representatives; 1986	Succeeded by Mitsuo Horiuchi
Party political offices
Split from Seisaku Kagaku Kenkyūkai	Head of Kinmirai Seiji Kenkyūkai; 1998–2012	Succeeded by Nobuteru Ishihara
Preceded by Yoshinobu Shimamura	Chair, Diet Affairs Committee of the Liberal Democratic Party; 1995	Succeeded by Kanezō Muraoka
Preceded by Kōichi Kato	Chair, Policy Research Council of the Liberal Democratic Party; 1995–1998	Succeeded by Yukihiko Ikeda
Preceded by Makoto Koga	Secretary-General of the Liberal Democratic Party; 2001–2003	Succeeded by Shinzō Abe
Preceded by Keizō Obuchi (in 1995)	Vice-President of the Liberal Democratic Party; 2003	Succeeded by Tadamori Oshima (in 2010)
