= Tamisuke Watanuki =

Japanese politician (1927–2026)

- 綿貫 民輔
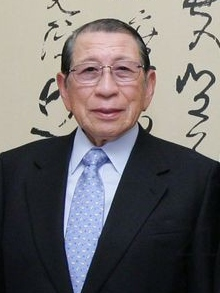
- Watanuki in 2009

Speaker of the House of Representatives
- In office 4 July 2000 – 10 October 2003
- Monarch: Akihito
- Deputy: Kōzō Watanabe
- Preceded by: Sōichirō Itō
- Succeeded by: Yōhei Kōno

Minister of Construction
- In office 28 February 1990 – 29 December 1990
- Prime Minister: Toshiki Kaifu
- Preceded by: Shōzō Harada
- Succeeded by: Yūji Ōtsuka

Director-General of the National Land Agency
- In office 22 July 1986 – 6 November 1987
- Prime Minister: Yasuhiro Nakasone
- Preceded by: Heihachirō Yamazaki
- Succeeded by: Seisuke Okuno

Director-General of the Hokkaido Development Agency and the Okinawa Development Agency
- In office 22 July 1986 – 6 November 1987
- Prime Minister: Yasuhiro Nakasone
- Preceded by: Raishirō Koga
- Succeeded by: Shigeru Kasuya

Member of the House of Representatives
- In office 29 December 1969 – 21 July 2009
- Preceded by: Matsutarō Shōriki
- Succeeded by: Keiichiro Tachibana
- Constituency: Toyama 2nd (1969–1996); Toyama 3rd (1996–2009)

Member of the Toyama Prefectural Assembly
- In office 1959–1967

Personal details
- Born: 30 April 1927 Inami, Toyama, Japan
- Died: 18 August 2026 (aged 99)
- Party: LDP (1969–2005; 2016–2026)
- Other political affiliations: PNP (2005–2013); Independent (2013–2016)
- Education: Keio University

Tamisuke Watanuki (綿貫 民輔, Watanuki Tamisuke; 30 April 1927 – 18 August 2026) was a Japanese politician who served as Speaker of the House of Representatives from 2000 to 2003.

== Life and career ==
Tamisuke Watanuki was born in Inami, Toyama Prefecture on 30 April 1927. His father was a businessman and local politician who founded the Tonami Transportation Company. He married the daughter of Sakae Watanuki, the chief priest of the Inami Hachimangu Shrine, and was adopted as a son-in-law.

He graduated from the Department of Economics at Keio University. He took over as president of Tonami Transportation in 1955 and was elected to the Toyama Prefectural Assembly in 1959. He was elected to the Diet in 1969 as a member of the Liberal Democratic Party.

Watanuki served as Parliamentary Vice Minister of International Trade and Industry in 1975 in the cabinet of Prime Minister Miki, and as Parliamentary Vice Minister of Posts and Telecommunications under Prime Minister Fukuda, as well as some other cabinet positions through the 1980s. He was Speaker of the House of Representatives from July 2000 to November 2003.

He vigorously opposed Prime Minister Koizumi's plan to privatize the national post service and formed the People's New Party in 2005 to oppose the plan. Although Koizumi's party handily won a strong majority in the elections on 11 September 2005, Watanuki crushed the challenger in his district.

Watanuki died on 18 August 2026, at the age of 99.

House of Representatives (Japan)
Preceded by Hiroyuki Masuoka	Chairman of the Committee on Financial Affairs; 1980–1981	Succeeded by Yoshirō Mori
Preceded by Chūbun Hatano	Chairman of the Committee on Judicial Affairs; 1982–1983	Succeeded by Moichi Miyazaki
Preceded by Ichirō Ozawa	Chairman of the Committee on Rules and Administration; 1986	Succeeded by Ihei Ochi
Preceded by Sōichirō Itō	Speaker of the House of Representatives of Japan; 2000–2003	Succeeded by Yōhei Kōno
Political offices
Preceded by Heihachirō Yamazaki	Director General of the National Land Agency; 1986–1987	Succeeded by Seisuke Okuno
Preceded by Raishirō Koga	Director General of the Hokkaido Development Agency; 1986–1987	Succeeded by Shigeru Kasuya
Preceded by Raishirō Koga	Director General of the Okinawa Development Agency; 1986–1987	Succeeded by Shigeru Kasuya
Preceded by Shōzō Harada	Minister of Construction; 1990	Succeeded by Yūji Ōtsuka
Party political offices
Preceded by Keizō Obuchi	Secretary-General of the Liberal Democratic Party; 1991–1992	Succeeded by Seiroku Kajiyama
Preceded by Keizō Obuchi	Head of Heisei Kenkyūkai; 1998–2000	Succeeded by Ryūtarō Hashimoto
New political party	President of the People's New Party; 2005–2009	Succeeded by Shizuka Kamei
