= Ishikawa 2nd district =

Legislative district of Japan

- Parliamentary constituency for the House of Representatives
- Numbered map of Ishikawa Prefecture single-member districts
- Electorate: 320,562 (as of February 8, 2026)

Current constituency
- Created: 1994
- Number of members: 1
- Party: LDP
- Representative: Hajime Sasaki

Ishikawa 2nd district (石川[県第]2区, Ishikawa-[ken-dai-]ni-ku) is a single-member constituency of the House of Representatives, the lower house of the national Diet of Japan. It is located in Southern Ishikawa Prefecture and covers the cities of Komatsu, Kaga, Nomi, Hakusan, Nonoichi and the town of Kawakita (the one remaining municipality of Nomi District).

The district's first representative after the electoral reform of the 1990s was Liberal Democrat Yoshirō Mori (Machimura faction) who had represented the pre-reform three-member Ishikawa 1st district since 1969. In April 2000, Mori was elected LDP president uncontested to replace Keizō Obuchi who had suffered an eventually fatal stroke, but resigned after one year. In the 2009 election when the LDP-led coalition lost its majority, Mori narrowly defended his district against Democratic newcomer Mieko Tanaka. In previous elections, Mori's main challenger had been reformist conservative former Liberal Democratic prefectural assemblyman Yasuo Ichikawa (LDP→JRP→NFP→LP→DPJ) who was elected in the proportional representation bloc three times and went on to become Councillor for Ishikawa in 2007.

In 2012, Mori retired. His son and former secretary Yūki Mori had resigned from his prefectural assembly seat in 2010 over a car accident under the influence. He died in 2011. The LDP candidacy in Ishikawa 2nd district went to political newcomer Hajime Sasaki, a former director of a building management company from Nomi City. Sasaki safely held the seat for the LDP.

== List of representatives ==
Representative	Party	Dates	Notes
Yoshirō Mori	LDP	1996–2012	Retired
Hajime Sasaki	LDP	2012–	Incumbent

== Election results ==
2026
Party	Candidate	Votes	%	±%
LDP	Hajime Sasaki	139,808	83.6	▲25.8
JCP	Hiroshi Sakamoto	27,476	16.4	▲10.2
Registered electors		320,562		
Turnout		167,284	56.33	▲0.19
LDP hold				

2024
Party	Candidate	Votes	%	±%
LDP	Hajime Sasaki	100,617	57.8	
CDP	Tsuneko Oyamada	62,588	36.0	
JCP	Hiroshi Sakamoto	10,873	6.2	
Registered electors		321,957		
Turnout			56.14	▲0.01
LDP hold				

2021
Party	Candidate	Votes	%	±%
LDP	Hajime Sasaki	137,032	78.4	
JCP	Hiroshi Sakamoto	27,049	15.5	
Independent	Yasuhiko Yamamoto	10.632	6.1	
Registered electors		325,273		
Turnout			56.13	▼3.64
LDP hold				

2017
Party	Candidate	Votes	%	±%
LDP	Hajime Sasaki	118,421	62.3	
Kibō no Tō	Miki Shibata	58,164	30.6	
JCP	Masakazu Honda	9,920	5.2	
Happiness Realization	Satoshi Miyamoto	3,472	1.8	
Registered electors		326,183		
Turnout			59.77	▲10.22
LDP hold				

2014
Party	Candidate	Votes	%	±%
LDP	Hajime Sasaki	110,583	75.5	
JCP	Hiroshi Nishimura	30,889	21.1	
Independent	Shigeru Hamasaki	5,075	3.5	
Registered electors		318,066		
Turnout			49.55	
LDP hold				

2012
Party	Candidate	Votes	%	±%
LDP (Kōmeitō, NRP)	Hajime Sasaki	123,283	64.5	
DPJ (PNP)	Keiko Miyamoto	37,601	19.7	
SDP	Yūji Hosono	17,161	9.0	
JCP	Hiroshi Nishimura	13,184	6.9	

2009
Party	Candidate	Votes	%	±%
LDP (Kōmeitō)	Yoshirō Mori	123,490	50.2	
DPJ (PNP)	Mieko Tanaka (elected by PR)	119,021	48.4	
HRP	Satoshi Miyamoto	3,467	1.4	
Turnout		250,019	78.8	

2005
Party	Candidate	Votes	%	±%
LDP	Yoshirō Mori	129,785	57.6	
DPJ	Yasuo Ichikawa	83,905	37.3	
JCP	Hiroshi Nishimura	11,515	5.1	
Turnout		230,315	73.3	

2003
Party	Candidate	Votes	%	±%
LDP	Yoshirō Mori	114,541	55.6	
DPJ	Yasuo Ichikawa (elected by PR)	82,069	39.8	
JCP	Hiroshi Nishimura	9,342	4.5	
Turnout		210,585	67.6	

2000
Party	Candidate	Votes	%	±%
LDP	Yoshirō Mori	142,457	64.4	
LP	Yasuo Ichikawa (elected by PR)	67,756	30.6	
JCP	Hiroshi Nishimura	10,859	4.9	

1996
Party	Candidate	Votes	%	±%
LDP	Yoshirō Mori	105,586	51.7	
NFP	Yasuo Ichikawa (elected by PR)	80,534	39.4	
JCP	Hiroshi Nishimura	10,467	5.1	
Independent	Shigeichi Morohashi	7,793	3.8	
Turnout		209,978	71.7	

House of Representatives (Japan)
Preceded by Gunma 5th district	Constituency represented by the prime minister 2000–2001	Succeeded by Kanagawa 11th district
