= 2009 Liberal Democratic Party presidential election =

Political party election in Japan

- 28 September 2009
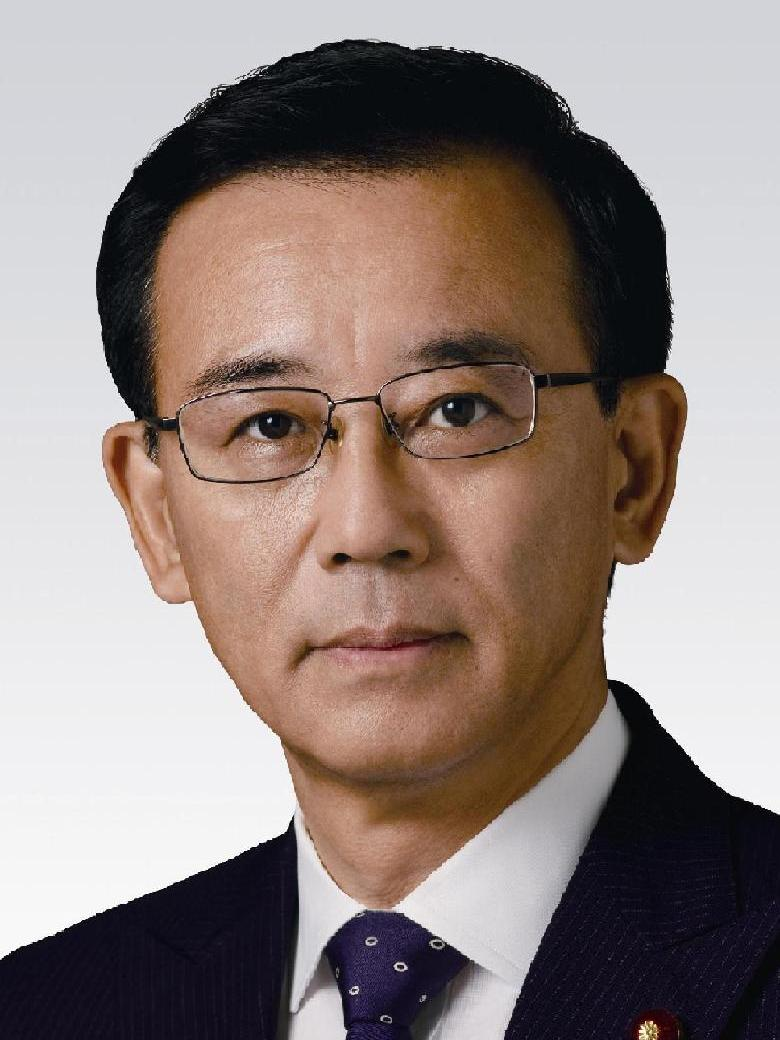

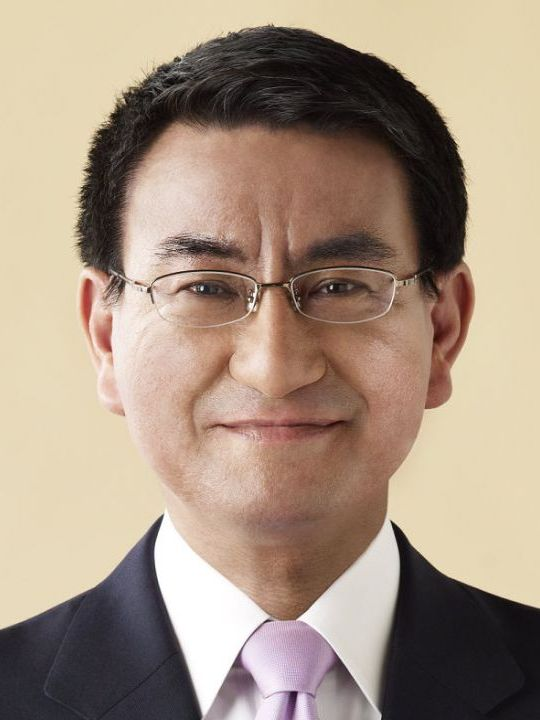

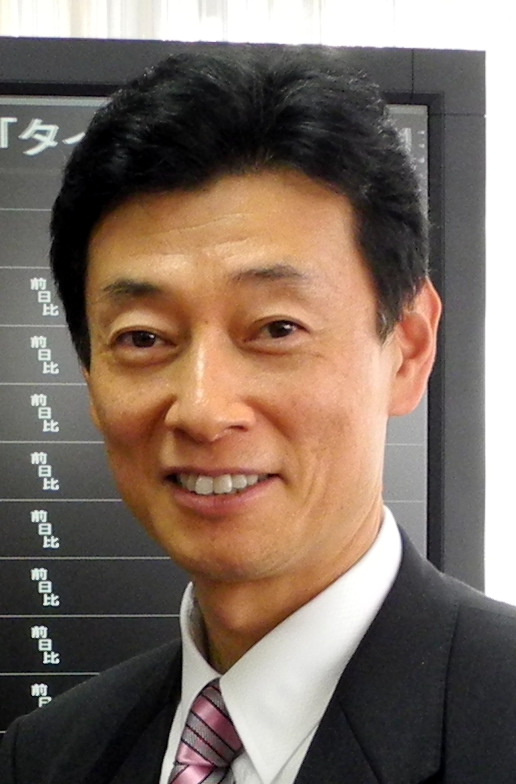
Candidate	Sadakazu Tanigaki	Taro Kono	Yasutoshi Nishimura
Leader's seat	Kyoto 5th	Kanagawa 15th	Hyōgo 9th
LDP MPs	120 (60.60%)	35 (17.68%)	43 (21.72%)
Party members	180 (60.00%)	109 (36.33%)	11 (3.67%)
Total	300 (60.24%)	144 (28.92%)	54 (10.84%)
President before election
Tarō Asō
Elected President
Sadakazu Tanigaki

A presidential election was held in the Liberal Democratic Party of Japan on 28 September 2009 after the incumbent party leader and outgoing Prime Minister of Japan Tarō Asō announced that he would resign after losing badly in the general election held on 30 August 2009. Asō announced on 8 September he would resign on 16 September 2009, which he did as planned.

== Candidates ==
In order to run in the election, a candidate must have the support of at least twenty LDP MPs. Since there are 387 LDP Diet members and 141 prefectural LDP representatives (three for each of the 47 prefectural chapters), there is a total of 528 votes.

Former finance minister Sadakazu Tanigaki announced on 13 September 2009 he would stand in the election. Tanigaki had also been a candidate in the 2006 leadership election, where he came in third place behind Shinzō Abe and Tarō Asō. Yasutoshi Nishimura and Taro Kono (son of former LDP leader Yōhei Kōno) are the other two announced candidates.

Agriculture minister Shigeru Ishiba was also considered a possible candidate, but he did not stand.

=== Declared ===
Candidate(s)	Date of birth	Current position	Party faction	Electoral district
Sadakazu Tanigaki	7 March 1945 (age 64)	Member of the House of Representatives (since 1983) Other offices: Minister of Land, Infrastructure, Transport and Tourism (2008); Minister of Finance (2003–2006); Chairperson of the National Public Safety Commission (2002–2003)	Kōchikai (Koga)	Kyoto 5th
Taro Kono	10 January 1963 (age 46)	Member of the House of Representatives (since 1996) Previous offices held: State Minister of Justice (2005–2006); Parliamentary Vice-Minister for Internal Affairs and Communications (2002)	Ikōkai (Asō)	Kanagawa 15th
bSize = 120 Yasutoshi Nishimura	15 October 1962 (age 46)	Member of the House of Representatives (since 2003) Previous offices held: Parliamentary Vice-Minister for Foreign Affairs (2008–2009)	Seiwa Seisaku Kenkyūkai (Machimura)	Hyōgo 9th

== Supporters ==
=== Recommenders ===
Party regulations require candidates to have the written support at least 20 Diet members, known as recommenders, to run.

Sadakazu Tanigaki

Leader of recommenders

- Takashi Tanihata (Member of the House of Representatives for Kinki PR block) (Seiwakai)

Campaign Manager

- Ryotaro Tanose (Member of the House of Representatives for Nara 4th district) (Kinmirai Seiji Kenkyūkai)

Recommenders

- Masatoshi Ishida (Member of the House of Representatives for Kinki PR block) (Kinmirai Seiji Kenkyūkai)
- Nobuteru Ishihara (Member of the House of Representatives for Tokyo 8th district) (Kinmirai Seiji Kenkyūkai)
- Masahiro Imamura (Member of the House of Representatives for Kyushu PR block) (no faction)
- Takeshi Iwaya (Member of the House of Representatives for Kyushu PR block) (Ikōkai)
- Yasuhiro Ozato (Member of the House of Representatives for Kagoshima 4th district) (Kōchikai)
- Yuriko Koike (Member of the House of Representatives for Tokyo PR block) (Seiwakai)
- Genichiro Sata (Member of the House of Representatives for Northern Kanto PR block) (Heiseiken)
- Tsuyoshi Takagi (Member of the House of Representatives for Fukui 3rd district) (Seiwakai)
- Wataru Takeshita (Member of the House of Representatives for Shimane 2nd district) (Heiseiken)
- Koichi Tani (Member of the House of Representatives for Kinki PR block) (Shisuikai)
- Takeshi Tokuda (Member of the House of Representatives for Kagoshima 2nd district) (Kōchikai)
- Seiichiro Murakami (Member of the House of Representatives for Ehime 2nd district) (Banchōken)
- Hiroshi Moriyama (Member of the House of Representatives for Kagoshima 5th district) (Kinmirai Seiji Kenkyūkai)
- Shinya Izumi (Member of the House of Councillors from National PR block) (Atarashii Nami)
- Issei Kitagawa (Member of the House of Councillors from Osaka) (Seiwakai)
- Masahisa Sato (Member of the House of Councillors from National PR block) (Heiseiken)
- Satoshi Ninoyu (Member of the House of Councillors from Kyoto) (Heiseiken)
- Masako Mori (Member of the House of Councillors from Fukushima) (Seiwakai)
Taro Kono

Leader of recommenders

- Masahiko Shibayama (Member of the House of Representatives for Northern Kanto PR block) (Seiwakai)

Campaign Manager

- Masaaki Taira (Member of the House of Representatives for Tokyo PR block) (Kinmirai Seiji Kenkyūkai)

Recommenders

- Jiro Aichi (Member of the House of Councillors from Miyagi) (no faction)
- Shinji Inoue (Member of the House of Representatives for Tokyo 25th district) (Ikōkai)
- Hideaki Ōmura (Member of the House of Representatives for Tōkai PR block) (Heiseiken)
- Katsuyuki Kawai (Member of the House of Representatives for Chūgoku PR block) (Heiseiken)
- Yoriko Kawaguchi (Member of the House of Councillors from National PR block) (no faction)
- Shinobu Kandori (Member of the House of Councillors from National PR block) (no faction)
- Akio Koizumi (Member of the House of Councillors from Kanagawa) (no faction)
- Ken Saitō (Member of the House of Representatives for Southern Kanto PR block) (no faction)
- Isshu Sugawara (Member of the House of Representatives for Tokyo PR block) (no faction)
- Hiroshige Sekō (Member of the House of Councillors from Wakayama) (Seiwakai)
- Kazunori Tanaka (Member of the House of Representatives for Southern Kanto PR block) (Kinmirai Seiji Kenkyūkai)
- Kotaro Tamura (Member of the House of Councillors from Tottori) (Heiseiken)
- Ichiro Tsukada (Member of the House of Councillors from Niigata) (Ikōkai)
- Keiko Nagaoka (Member of the House of Representatives for Northern Kanto PR block) (Ikōkai)
- Katsuei Hirasawa (Member of the House of Representatives for Tokyo 17th district) (Kinmirai Seiji Kenkyūkai)
- Kazuya Maruyama (Member of the House of Councillors from National PR block) (no faction)
- Ichita Yamamoto (Member of the House of Councillors from Gunma) (Seiwakai)
- Hiroyuki Yoshiie (Member of the House of Councillors from National PR block) (Seiwakai)
Yasutoshi Nishimura

Leader of recommenders

- Katsunobu Katō (Member of the House of Representatives for Okayama 5th district) (Heiseiken)

Campaign Manager

- Ryota Takeda (Member of the House of Representatives for Fukuoka 11th district) (Kinmirai Seiji Kenkyūkai)

Recommenders

- Ichirō Kamoshita (Member of the House of Representatives for Tokyo PR block) (Heiseiken)
- Tarō Kimura (Member of the House of Representatives for Aomori 4th district) (Seiwakai)
- Shigeo Kitamura (Member of the House of Representatives for Hokuriku-Shin'etsu PR block) (Seiwakai)
- Ryū Shionoya (Member of the House of Representatives for Tōkai PR block) (Seiwakai)
- Sanae Takaichi (Member of the House of Representatives for Kinki PR block) (Seiwakai)
- Hiroshi Hase (Member of the House of Representatives for Hokuriku-Shin'etsu PR block) (Seiwakai)
- Kunio Hatoyama (Member of the House of Representatives for Fukuoka 6th district) (Heiseiken)
- Motohisa Furukawa (Member of the House of Representatives for Aichi 2nd district) (Kinmirai Seiji Kenkyūkai)
- Keiji Furuya (Member of the House of Representatives for Tōkai PR block) (Shisuikai)
- Norio Mitsuya (Member of the House of Representatives for Mie 5th district) (Kōchikai)
- Yūji Yamamoto (Member of the House of Representatives for Kōchi 3rd district) (Banchōken)
- Kaoru Yosano (Member of the House of Representatives for Tokyo PR block) (no faction)
- Seiichi Eto (Member of the House of Councillors from National PR block) (Shisuikai)
- Yōsuke Isozaki (Member of the House of Councillors from Ōita) (Seiwakai)
- Shinsuke Suematsu (Member of the House of Councillors from Hyōgo) (Seiwakai)
- Kyoko Nakayama (Member of the House of Councillors from National PR block) (Seiwakai)
- Toshiharu Furukawa (Member of the House of Councillors from Saitama) (Seiwakai)
- Eriko Yamatani (Member of the House of Councillors from National PR block) (Seiwakai)

Number of recommenders by factions

Candidates	Sadakazu Tanigaki	Taro Kono	Yasutoshi Nishimura
Atarashii Nami	1	0	0
Banchō Seisaku Kenkyūjo	1	0	1
Heisei Kenkyūkai	4	3	3
Ikōkai	1	3	0
Kinmirai Seiji Kenkyūkai	4	3	2
Kōchikai	2	0	1
Seiwa Seisaku Kenkyūkai	5	4	10
Shisuikai	1	0	2
No faction	1	7	1

== Campaign ==
A public debate was held on 19 September 2009. Tanigaki was elected with 300 of 498 ballots.

== Results ==
Full result
Candidate	Diet members		Party members				Total points	
Candidate	Votes	%	Popular votes	%	Allocated votes	%	Votes	%
Sadakazu Tanigaki 当	120	60.60%	265,926	53.22%	180	60.00%	300	60.24%
Taro Kono	35	17.68%	184,504	36.93%	109	36.33%	144	28.92%
Yasutoshi Nishimura	43	21.72%	49,208	9.85%	11	3.67%	54	10.84%
Total	198	100.00%	499,638	100.00%	300	100.00%	498	100.00%
Valid votes	198	99.50%	499,638	99.02%	300	100.00%	498	99.80%
Invalid and blank votes	1	0.50%	4,940	0.98%	0	100.00%	1	0.20%
Turnout	199	100.00%	504,578	46.65%	300	100.00%	499	100.00%
Registered voters	199	100.00%	1,081,676	100.00%	300	100.00%	499	100.00%

=== Results of Party Members' Votes by Prefectures ===
Results of Party Members' Votes by Prefectures
Prefectures	Sadakazu Tanigaki			Taro Kono			Yasutoshi Nishimura		
Prefectures	Votes	%		Votes	%		Votes	%	
Aichi	10,187	49.0%	5	9,014	43.3%	5	1,595	7.7%	0
Akita	2,548	55.3%	3	1,672	36.3%	2	386	8.4%	0
Aomori	4,742	61.4%	4	1,799	23.3%	1	1,178	15.3%	0
Chiba	5,056	50.9%	3	4,235	42.6%	3	651	6.5%	0
Ehime	7,365	55.7%	5	4,819	36.5%	3	1,028	7.8%	0
Fukui	3,819	66.2%	4	1,581	27.4%	1	369	6.4%	0
Fukuoka	7,103	56.1%	5	4,221	33.4%	2	1,334	10.5%	0
Fukushima	3,688	58.3%	3	2,018	31.9%	2	617	9.8%	0
Gifu	11,438	57.3%	6	6,665	33.4%	3	1,860	9.3%	0
Gunma	5,113	52.7%	3	3,942	40.7%	3	636	6.6%	0
Hiroshima	8,851	45.7%	4	8,829	45.6%	4	1,686	8.7%	0
Hokkaido	8,580	51.2%	5	6,795	40.6%	3	1,378	8.2%	0
Hyōgo	5,728	39.4%	3	3,914	27.0%	2	4,881	33.6%	3
Ibaraki	11,306	47.7%	5	10,107	42.6%	5	2,302	9.7%	1
Ishikawa	5,688	44.2%	3	3,439	26.7%	2	3,735	29.1%	2
Iwate	2,281	58.6%	3	1,360	34.9%	2	255	6.5%	0
Kagawa	5,653	58.3%	4	3,425	35.4%	2	614	6.3%	0
Kagoshima	6,199	65.7%	5	2,656	28.2%	2	577	6.1%	0
Kanagawa	5,593	25.2%	2	15,862	71.5%	7	721	3.3%	0
Kōchi	3,581	77.3%	4	606	13.1%	0	447	9.6%	0
Kumamoto	4,927	65.8%	4	2,091	27.9%	2	473	6.3%	0
Kyoto	7,734	85.4%	5	1,149	12.7%	0	171	1.9%	0
Mie	3,612	63.4%	4	1,586	27.8%	1	501	8.8%	0
Miyagi	2,860	42.4%	2	3,065	45.4%	3	825	12.2%	0
Miyazaki	1,980	39.6%	2	1,122	22.5%	1	1,895	37.9%	2
Nagano	3,703	53.6%	3	2,731	39.6%	2	470	6.8%	0
Nagasaki	4,750	60.7%	5	2,580	32.9%	2	501	6.4%	0
Nara	2,433	64.5%	3	1,043	27.6%	1	297	7.9%	0
Niigata	5,625	51.3%	3	4,495	41.0%	3	842	7.7%	0
Ōita	3,986	59.5%	4	1,947	29.0%	1	768	11.5%	0
Okayama	5,254	57.1%	4	2,689	29.2%	2	1,264	13.7%	0
Okinawa	1,181	47.9%	2	833	33.8%	1	453	18.3%	1
Osaka	10,553	53.9%	5	7,409	37.9%	4	1,603	8.2%	0
Saga	2,935	64.6%	4	1,298	28.6%	1	311	6.8%	0
Saitama	6,216	47.1%	4	6,027	45.7%	4	956	7.2%	0
Shiga	4,124	66.7%	4	1,646	26.6%	1	412	6.7%	0
Shimane	6,458	75.9%	5	1,485	17.5%	1	566	6.6%	0
Shizuoka	8,354	51.7%	5	6,363	39.3%	3	1,454	9.0%	0
Tochigi	4,671	55.3%	3	3,287	39.0%	2	482	5.7%	0
Tokushima	3,672	61.1%	3	1,999	33.2%	2	342	5.7%	0
Tokyo	19,798	45.4%	7	18,982	43.6%	7	4,773	11.0%	1
Tottori	3,494	75.9%	3	893	19.4%	1	219	4.7%	0
Toyama	9,257	65.4%	6	3,895	27.5%	2	1,002	7.1%	0
Wakayama	1,537	33.6%	1	2,859	62.6%	3	174	3.8%	0
Yamagata	4,455	77.4%	4	1,068	18.5%	1	234	4.1%	0
Yamaguchi	4,411	48.0%	3	3,086	33.6%	2	1,691	18.4%	1
Yamanashi	3,427	60.9%	3	1,917	34.1%	2	279	5.0%	0
Total	265,926	53.2%	180	184,504	36.9%	109	49,208	9.9%	11
