= Taro Kono =

Japanese politician (born 1963)

- 河野 太郎
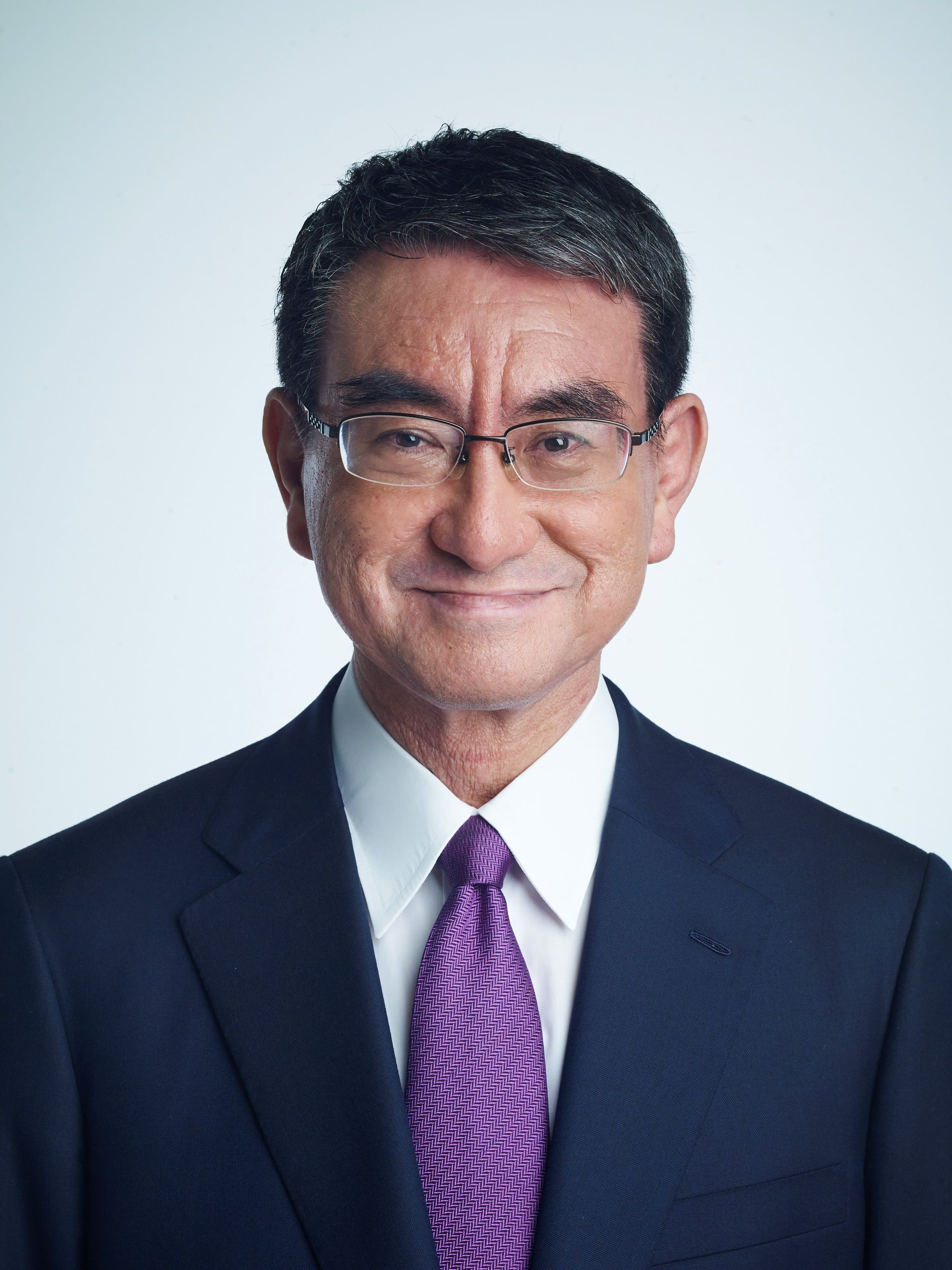
- Official portrait, 2010

Minister for Digital Transformation
- In office 10 August 2022 – 1 October 2024
- Prime Minister: Fumio Kishida
- Preceded by: Karen Makishima
- Succeeded by: Masaaki Taira

Minister for Administrative Reform and Regulatory Reform
- In office 16 September 2020 – 4 October 2021
- Prime Minister: Yoshihide Suga
- Preceded by: Ryota Takeda
- Succeeded by: Karen Makishima
- In office 7 October 2015 – 3 August 2016
- Prime Minister: Shinzo Abe
- Preceded by: Haruko Arimura
- Succeeded by: Kozo Yamamoto

Minister of Defense
- In office 11 September 2019 – 16 September 2020
- Prime Minister: Shinzo Abe
- Preceded by: Takeshi Iwaya
- Succeeded by: Nobuo Kishi

Minister for Foreign Affairs
- In office 3 August 2017 – 11 September 2019
- Prime Minister: Shinzo Abe
- Preceded by: Fumio Kishida
- Succeeded by: Toshimitsu Motegi

Chairman of the National Public Safety Commission
- In office 7 October 2015 – 3 August 2016
- Prime Minister: Shinzo Abe
- Preceded by: Eriko Yamatani
- Succeeded by: Jun Matsumoto

Member of the House of Representatives; for Kanagawa's 15th district
- Incumbent
- Assumed office 21 October 1996
- Preceded by: Constituency established

Personal details
- Born: 10 January 1963 (age 63) Hiratsuka, Kanagawa, Japan
- Party: Liberal Democratic (Shikōkai)
- Spouse: Kaori Kono
- Children: 1
- Parent: Yōhei Kōno (father)
- Relatives: Ichirō Kōno (paternal grandfather); Kenzō Kōno (great-uncle); Jihei Kōno (great-grandfather); Heizaburo Tagawa (great-grandfather)
- Education: Keio University (no degree); Georgetown University (BS)
- Website: konotaro.org

Taro Kono (河野 太郎, Kōno Tarō; born 10 January 1963) is a Japanese politician who served as the Minister for Digital Transformation from 2022 to 2024. A member of the Liberal Democratic Party (LDP), he previously served as Minister for Administrative Reform and Regulatory Reform from 2015 to 2016 and from 2020 to 2021, and was the Minister for Foreign Affairs and Minister of Defense under Prime Minister Shinzo Abe. He is also a member of the House of Representatives representing Kanagawa's 15th district since 1996.

Born in 1963 the eldest son of House Speaker and LDP President Yōhei Kōno, Kono grew up in a political family. Originally planning to study economics in Japan, he dropped out to attend Georgetown University, where he graduated with a Bachelor of Science in Foreign Service in 1983. After working in the private sector for more than a decade, Kono was first elected to the House of Representatives in 1996. In his career in the House, Kono served on various committees before running in the 2009 LDP leadership election; after losing to Sadakazu Tanigaki, he became Deputy Secretary-General of the LDP. After two years in the opposition, the LDP returned to power in the 2012 general election, while Kono remained a backbencher.

In October 2015, Prime Minister Shinzo Abe appointed Kono Minister for Administrative Reform and Regulatory Reform, a position he served in for less than year before resigning amidst a cabinet reshuffle. Kono returned to government in 2017 as Foreign Minister under Abe. His tenure oversaw a trade dispute with South Korea and deepening of ties with the United States. After about two years in that role, Abe designated Kono as Minister of Defense in 2019. As Defense Minister, he presided over the cancellation of the Aegis Ashore missile defense system, a more tense relationship with China, and the strengthening of security partnerships with nations in the Indo-Pacific. After Abe resigned in 2020, he was succeeded by Yoshihide Suga who retained Kono in his cabinet. Kono returned to his prior role as the Administrative Reform Minister, organizing Japan's vaccine rollout in response to the COVID-19 pandemic. Suga supported Kono to replace him as party president in the 2021 LDP leadership election, losing to Fumio Kishida in a second round run-off. After spending less than a year in the backbenches, Kono was appointed Digital Affairs Minister by Kishida in 2022. In this role he attempted to revive the My Number card system, and rolled out reforms for thousands of regulations in an effort to cut down on bureaucratic red tape. After Kishida resigned, he ran for party leadership for the third time in the 2024 LDP presidential election, coming in eighth place. He subsequently resigned as Digital Affairs Minister and has since continued as a backbencher in the Diet.

Kono has developed a reputation as a political maverick, with a tendency to hold positions on issues contrary to his party. Belonging to the conservative and centre-right Shikōkai faction, he is considered a centrist within the LDP, supporting same-sex marriage and more acceptance of immigrants into Japan. Kono also favors a strong national defense, strengthening alliances with the US and Canada, as well as Pacific partners like Australia and South Korea, and is a proponent of the concept of a Free and Open Indo-Pacific. He is also known for his large following on social media and his fluency in English. Kono has long been speculated as a potential future prime minister, running for party leadership three times.

== Early life and education ==
Taro Kono was born on 10 January 1963, in Hiratsuka, Kanagawa, the oldest of the three children of Yōhei Kōno, a former President of the Liberal Democratic Party and Speaker of the House of Representatives. He was born into a family of politicians: his father, his grandfather Ichirō Kōno, and his great-uncle Kenzō Kōno (Speaker of the House of Councillors between 1971 and 1977), were all active in Japanese politics.

Kono attended Hanamizu Elementary School, Keio Middle School, and then Keio Senior High School. In 1981, he entered Keio University to study economics but dropped out in order to study in the United States.

In 1982, he went to the United States, where he attended Suffield Academy and Georgetown University, and studied comparative politics. In 1983, he worked for Senator Alan Cranston in his campaign for the Democratic Party presidential nomination. He also worked for then Representative Richard Shelby of Alabama (at the time a Democrat) for two years. He also spent time at the Warsaw School of Economics, Poland, during which he spent a night in prison after visiting the home of Solidarity leader, Lech Wałęsa. Kono later said his visits abroad helped him see Japan "in an objective way".

Kono graduated from Georgetown University in 1985 with a Bachelor of Science in Foreign Service and the following year he joined Fuji Xerox. He moved to Fuji Xerox Asia Pacific in Singapore in 1991. In 1993, he joined Nippon Tanshi (日本端子), a supplier of electric components for Toyota, General Motors, Panasonic, and other companies.

== Political career ==
=== Member of the House of Representatives ===
"My honest reaction is, so what? There's only one Taro Kono."

- Kono on being compared to his father, upon his election to the House of Representatives in 1996.

Kono was first elected to the House of Representatives of Japan as a Liberal Democratic member in the October 1996 general election, at age 33. He won a closely contested election in the newly created Kanagawa 15th district covering the cities of Hiratsuka and Chigasaki, adjacent to his father's constituency in the Kanagawa 17th district (Odawara and Hadano). He has since been re-elected six times in 2000, 2003, 2005, 2009, 2012 and 2014, respectively. His winning majority increased from 13,297 in 1996 to 63,058 in 2000, 71,968 in 2003, and 103,280 in 2005. The total number of votes he received in 2005 was 186,770, the second largest number in Japan's electoral history (second only to then Prime Minister Koizumi's total in the same election).

Kono has been a member of five standing committees of the House of Representatives: Economy; Environment; Health, Labour, & Welfare; Trade & Industry; and Finance. In addition, he has been a member of two special committees: Consumer Affairs, and Children & Youth Affairs.From January to October 2002, Kono was Parliamentary Secretary for Public Management, responsible for administrative reforms, local governments, and "e-government." From November 2005 to September 2006 he was Senior Vice Minister of Justice in Koizumi's government.

In October 2002, Kono was named Director of the Foreign Affairs Committee of the House of Representatives. He resigned from this position two months later in protest over the Iraq War, accusing Foreign Minister Kawaguchi of not adequately explaining the government's policy.

Kono was the Acting Chairman of the Liberal Democratic Party Committee until November 2003 and was one of the few members of the LDP to oppose the dispatch of the Japan Self-Defense Forces to Iraq.

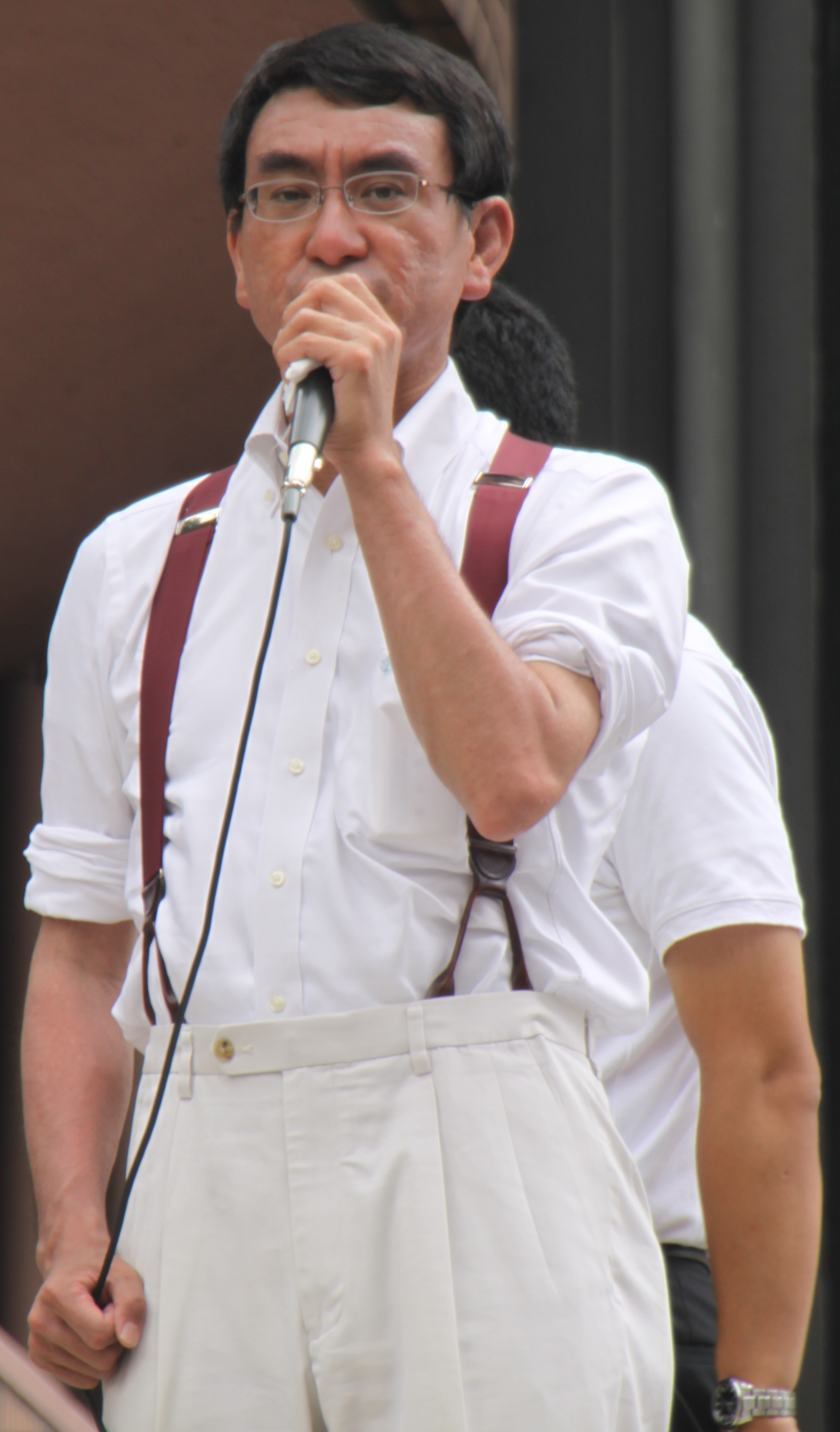
Kōno delivering a speech 1 July 2010.

In 2004, Kono, then 41, was appointed Assistant Secretary-General of the Liberal Democratic Party, and was also elected Prefectural Chairman of the Liberal Democratic Party in Kanagawa Prefecture. He was the youngest Prefectural Chairman in the LDP. In 2005, he led the Party in Kanagawa in the general election.

In 2004, Kono co-sponsored the Economic Sanction Amendment to the Foreign Exchange Law, which gives the government power to unilaterally declare economic sanctions on any state; and the Port Closure Bill, which allows the government to refuse the entry of foreign ships from Japanese ports. His website states that "North Korea was the target." He also sponsored a United Nations Reform Bill that would have required the government to reduce its voluntary contributions to the UN Systems by 10 percent each year until changes were made in the membership of the Security Council.

Kono resigned as head of the Kanagawa LDP following the 2007 local elections, in which the LDP-supported candidate Tadashi Sugino lost to incumbent Shigefumi Matsuzawa. He became head of the House of Representatives Foreign Affairs Committee in September 2008.

Kono ran for President of the LDP in 2009, but was defeated by Sadakazu Tanigaki. That year, he sprearheaded efforts to pass the Guam International Agreement in the Diet as Chairman of the Foreign Affairs Committee. The agreement, which called for the relocating of thousands of US Marines from Okinawa to the US territory of Guam, with Japan contributing billions in funding, was signed in February 2009.

Kono replaced Hiroyuki Sonoda as Deputy Secretary-General of the LDP in April 2010, after Sonoda left the party to join the Sunrise Party of Japan.

=== Abe government ===
==== Early roles ====
In October 2015, Kono joined the Third Abe Cabinet as Chairman of the National Public Safety Commission, Minister in charge of Administrative Reform, Minister in charge of Civil Service Reform, Minister of State for Consumer Affairs and Food Safety, Minister of State for Regulatory Reform and Minister of State for Disaster Management. In this role, he was responsible for coordinating security measures for the 2016 G7 summit, held in May 2016. The previous month, Kono helped oversee the government response to the 2016 Kumamoto earthquakes.

He promoted the relocation of the Consumer Affairs Agency to Tokushima Prefecture, but postponed the full relocation due to the difficulty in carrying out duties such as responding to Diet meetings and crisis management. After Kono stepped down as Minister of Consumer Affairs, after three years of consideration, it was announced that the full relocation of the Consumer Affairs Agency would be postponed.

He left government amidst a cabinet reshuffle in August 2016.

==== Minister of Foreign Affairs ====
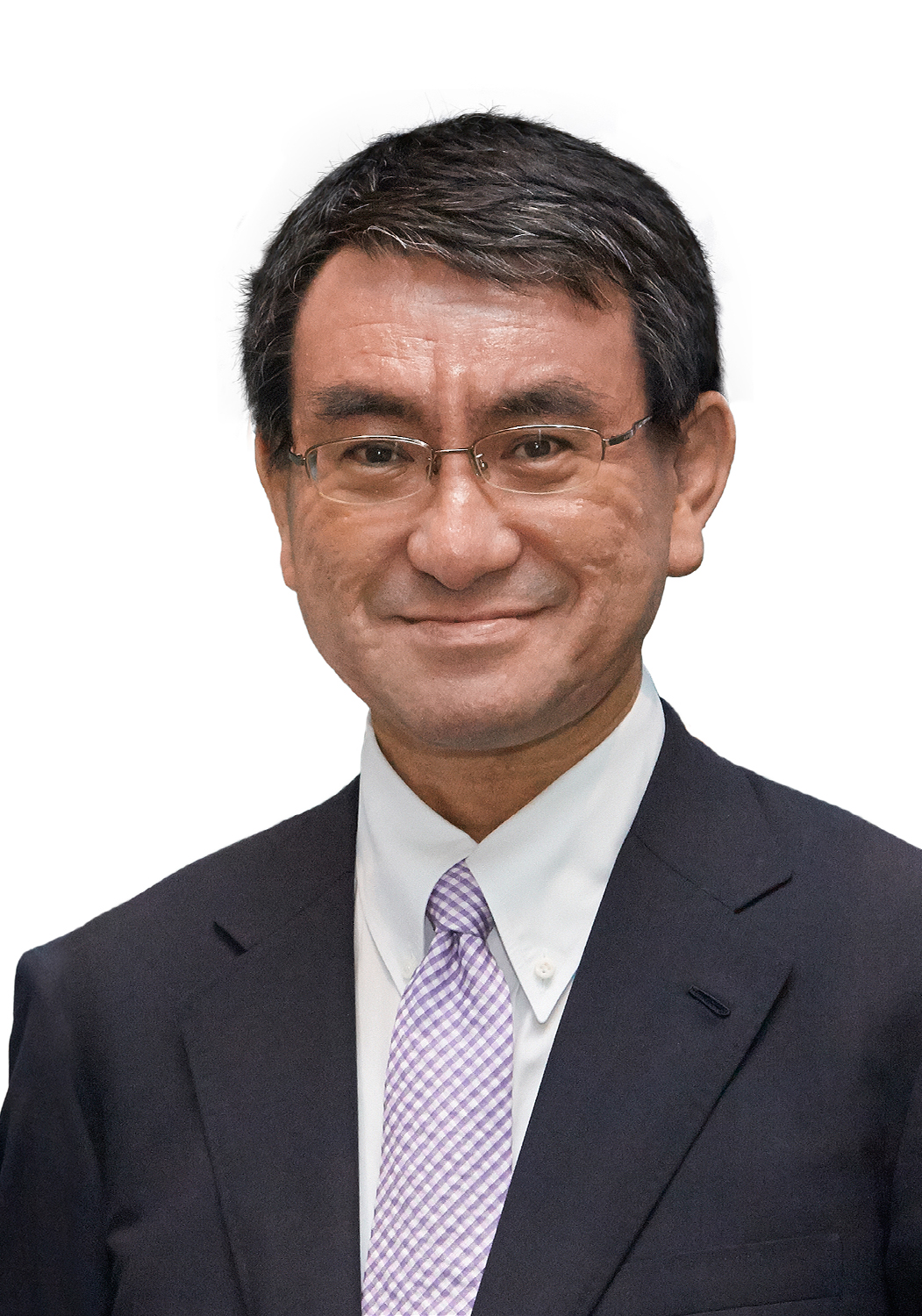
Official portrait, 2019

Prime Minister Shinzo Abe, named Kono Foreign Minister on 3 August 2017, replacing Fumio Kishida, who had served in that role since 2012 and had rarely publicly disagreed with Abe. Kono was chosen over Katsunobu Kato, after lengthy deliberation, for his superior English ability and his grasp of international issues, despite having a reputation as an outspoken and sometimes "eccentric" politician. Foreign media reports considered Kono to be more dovish compared to Abe, and expected him to take a softer diplomatic approach to foreign policy. Many analysts were particularly optimistic that Kono would adopt his father's friendly attitude toward China. Kono's past business, as well as political ties to the United States, made him very appealing to serve as Foreign Minister. Abe said of Kono appointment, "He has been to the United States many times and made friends there. He has also had exchanges with American politicians. I'm sure he'll serve (as minister) with an understanding of how to strengthen the Japan-U.S. alliance". Prime Minister Abe has made it explicitly clear that by appointing Kono to the position of Foreign Minister, he was trying to strengthen the already formidable Japanese American alliance. Kono's appointment to Foreign Minister has also been well received by Japan's surrounding neighbors”. Some Foreign Ministry officials say the appointment of Kono will be viewed favorably by China and South Korea.

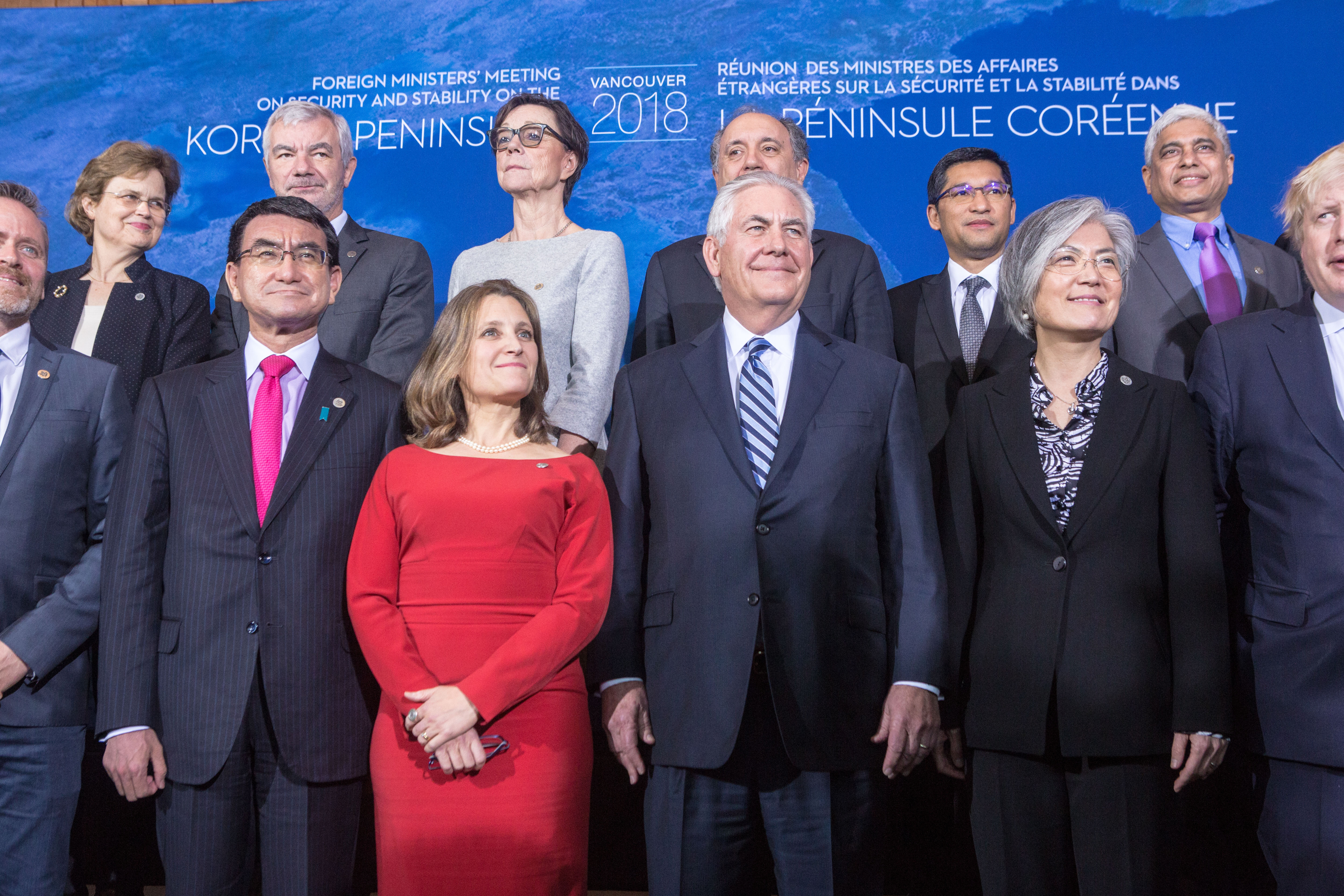
Kono (left) at the 2018 Korean Peninsula Summit in Vancouver, Canada.

Later that month, Kono visited the United States where he called for ratification of the Comprehensive Nuclear-Test-Ban Treaty (CTBT), which the US has not yet ratified.

As foreign minister, Kono was responsible for coordinating Japan's response to the North Korean crisis. He publicly urged countries to cut diplomatic and economic ties with North Korea following the announcement of enhanced sanctions by the US government in September 2017. Kono also reportedly pressed Iranian foreign minister Javad Zarif to increase Iranian pressure on North Korea. Kono's father publicly criticized the government's approach to the crisis, claiming that it should be more cooperative with the Chinese government. Kono held comprehensive talks with Saudi King Salman in that same month, as part of a Middle East tour. Kono sought cooperation from countries in the region, including Saudi Arabia, regarding North Korea, after it conducted its most powerful nuclear test in early September.

After the 2017 general election, which delivered a fresh majority for the LDP in the House of Representatives, Abe retained Kono as Foreign Minister in his fourth cabinet. Kono personally greeted US President Donald Trump when he arrived at Yokota Air Base in November 2017, during Trump’s first official visit to Japan. He later welcomed Trump during his 2019 state visit to Japan. Kono met with British Foreign Secretary Boris Johnson during a December 2017 trip to London, where the two reaffirmed their countries’ collaboration on security and defence matters. During the visit, Kono gifted Johnson a can of peach juice from Fukushima Prefecture.

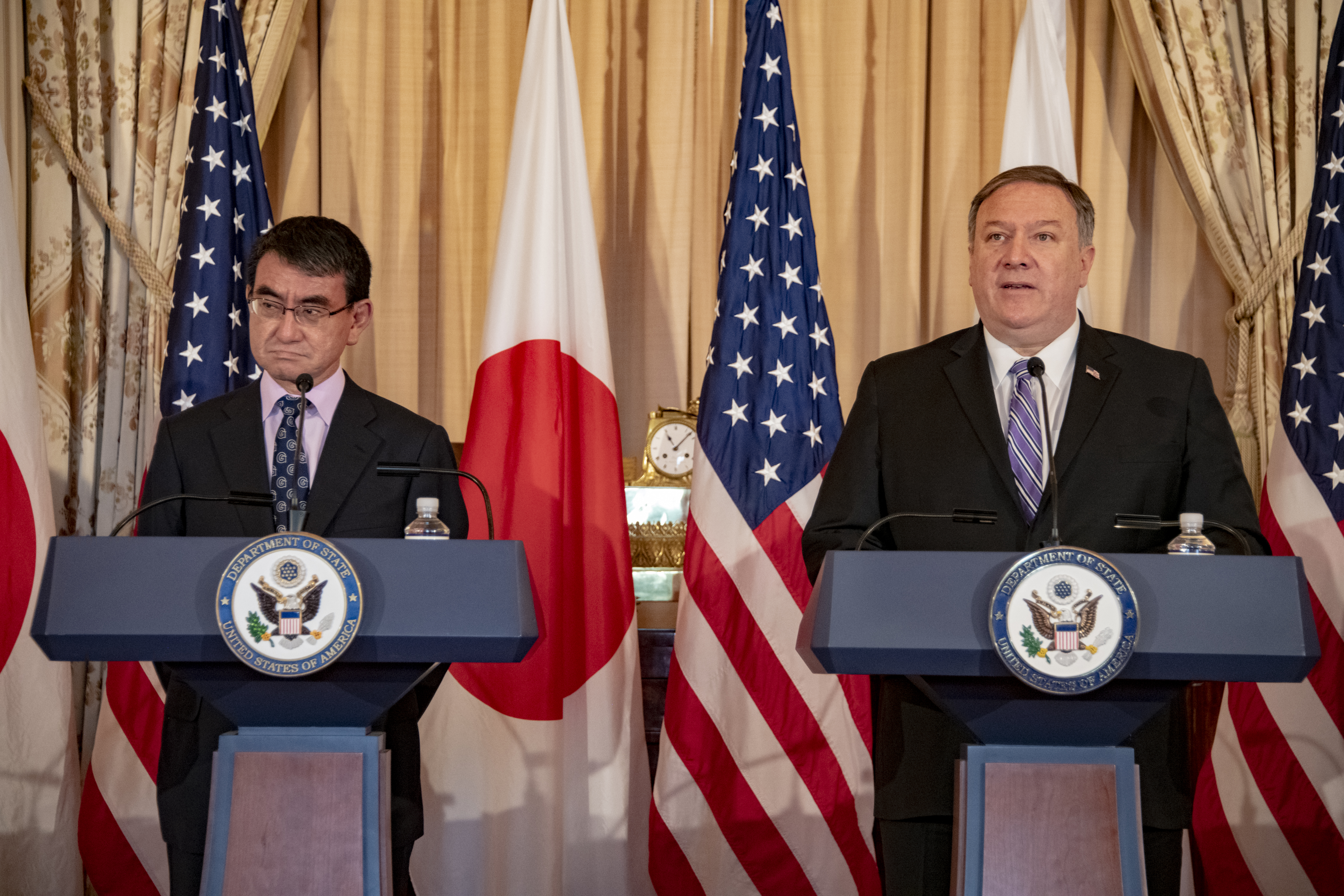
Kono with US Secretary of State Mike Pompeo in April 2019

Kono received Chinese Foreign Minister Wang Yi on 15 April 2018, who visited for several days during the leadup to Abe's visit to United States later that month. Kono was the first Japanese Foreign Minister to host an official Chinese counterpart visit for nearly a decade. Kono was re-appointed by Abe again during a cabinet reshuffle in October 2018. During a visit to New Zealand later that month, Kono raised concerns about high levels of debt accrued by some Pacific Island nations, and said Japan would be ready to help resolve the problem. Kono did not explicitly mention China, which has been accused of taking part in “debt-trap diplomacy”. In December 2018, he apologized for refusing to answer reporters' questions regarding Japan's territorial talks with Russia, specifically concerning the four southernmost islands of the Kuril chain, at a news conference earlier that month. Kono explained he did not want his comments to ‘affect public opinion’ within Russia. During the press conference, Kono did not confirm that the Russian-held Northern Territories are inherently part of Japan's territory. Mainichi argued that commenting on the matter could have jeopardized negotiations between Japan and the Russian government regarding the disputed islands.

As the foreign minister at the time, he was considered a leading figure behind a trade dispute with South Korea, which began in 2019, although he was considered friendly with the country as he is friends with various Korean politicians. At the end of his tenure in September 2019, Kono made over 100 visits to 59 countries.

==== Minister of Defense ====
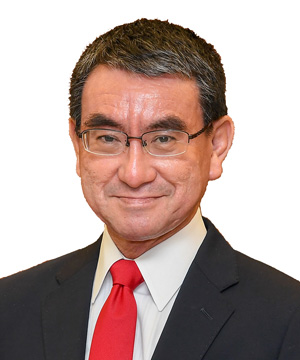
Official portrait as Minister of Defense, September 2019

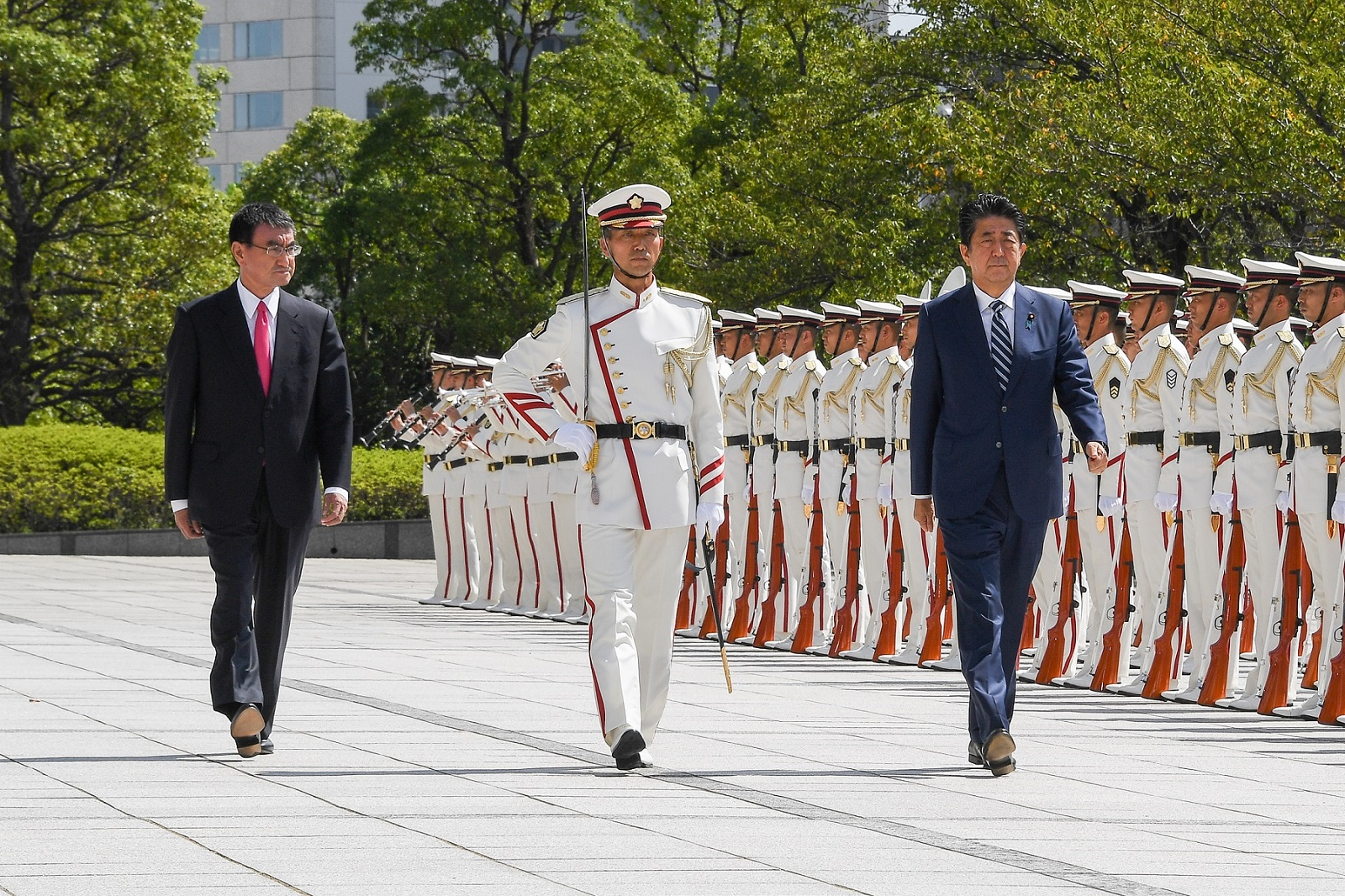
Kono with Prime Minister Shinzo Abe, shortly after his appointment as Defense Minister, 17 September 2019

On 11 September 2019, Kono was appointed Minister of Defense by Abe, joining his Fourth Cabinet in its second reshuffle. The Japan Times, which described Kono as a potential rival to Abe, stated that the "Defense Ministry, institutionally the weakest of all ministries in the government, would be a place to keep Kono’s influence in check."

In November 2019, Kono met with Australian Defense Minister Linda Reynolds, and consolidated a series of new measures designed to deepen the defense cooperation between both countries. Later that month, he visited an Indian Air Force Base in Hindan, Uttar Pradesh. His visit was part of the inaugural foreign and defense ministerial dialogue between India and Japan, which aimed to give further momentum to their special strategic partnership.

In January 2020, Kono stated that "Japan and the United States should speed up efforts to resolve the issue of undelivered and unsettled arms purchases", referring to the Aegis Ashore system Speaking at the Center for Strategic and International Studies, Kono celebrated the 60th Anniversary of the U.S.–Japan Alliance on 14 January.

The Defense Ministry launched a 'space defense unit' in May 2020. Kono said it was part of an effort to monitor and counter threats to the Japan's satellites. The Space Operations Squadron, part of the Japan Air Self-Defense Force, was set to be in full operation by 2023.

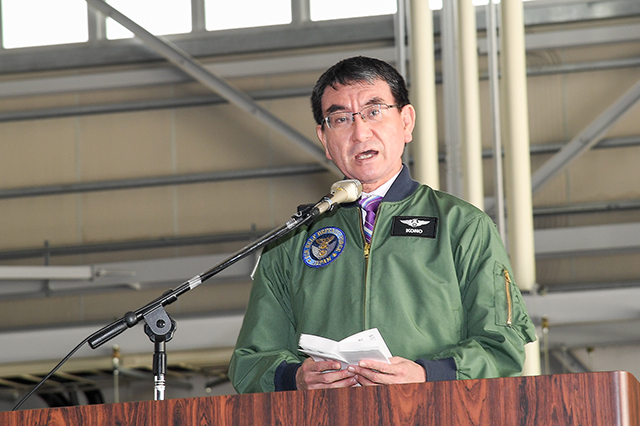
Kono gives a speech at Matsushima Air Base in February 2020.

On 15 June 2020, the United States announced the suspension of the Aegis Ashore deployment process, and on the following day, 25 June, it was announced that the National Security Council had officially decided abandon its deployment in Japan. Kono attributed the cancellation to costs and technical issues. The US Department of Defense stated the system would cost 200 billion yen ($1.89 billion) and noted an issue with the Aegis booster rocket that could take 12 years to resolve. Kono was reportedly upset with officials who had not learned of the flaws with the missile system sooner.

In August 2020, Kono warned the Chinese government that the Japanese Self-Defense Force would respond to any intrusions on the disputed Senkaku Islands. Later that month, Kono oversaw an aerial inspection of the islands. In late August, ono met with American Secretary of Defense Mark Esper to discuss the status of US forces on Guam, as well as actions of the Chinese government in the South China Sea, and the threat posed by North Korea.

After The Pentagon released videos pertaining to alleged UFO encounters, Kono unveiled an official protocol for encountering unidentified aerial phenomena in September 2020.

During his last week as Defense Minister in September 2020, Kono described China as a "security threat" for the first time. Addressing the Center for Strategic and International Studies, in Washington D.C., he stated "When I was foreign minister, I was very careful not to say that China is a threat although I repeatedly said 'grave concern' at news conferences. But as defense minister, I must say China has become a security threat to Japan."

=== Suga government ===
Shinzo Abe announced during a press conference on 28 August 2020 that he would resign as Prime Minister, due to the resurgence of his chronic ulcerative colitis. Upon Abe's announcement, Kono was seen as a potential successor. In the subsequent leadership election, Chief Cabinet Secretary Yoshihide Suga was elected to succeed Abe as LDP President and Prime Minister. Suga and his cabinet were officially appointed on 16 September 2020, ending the Abe era that had spanned 8 years.

==== Minister for Administrative Reform ====
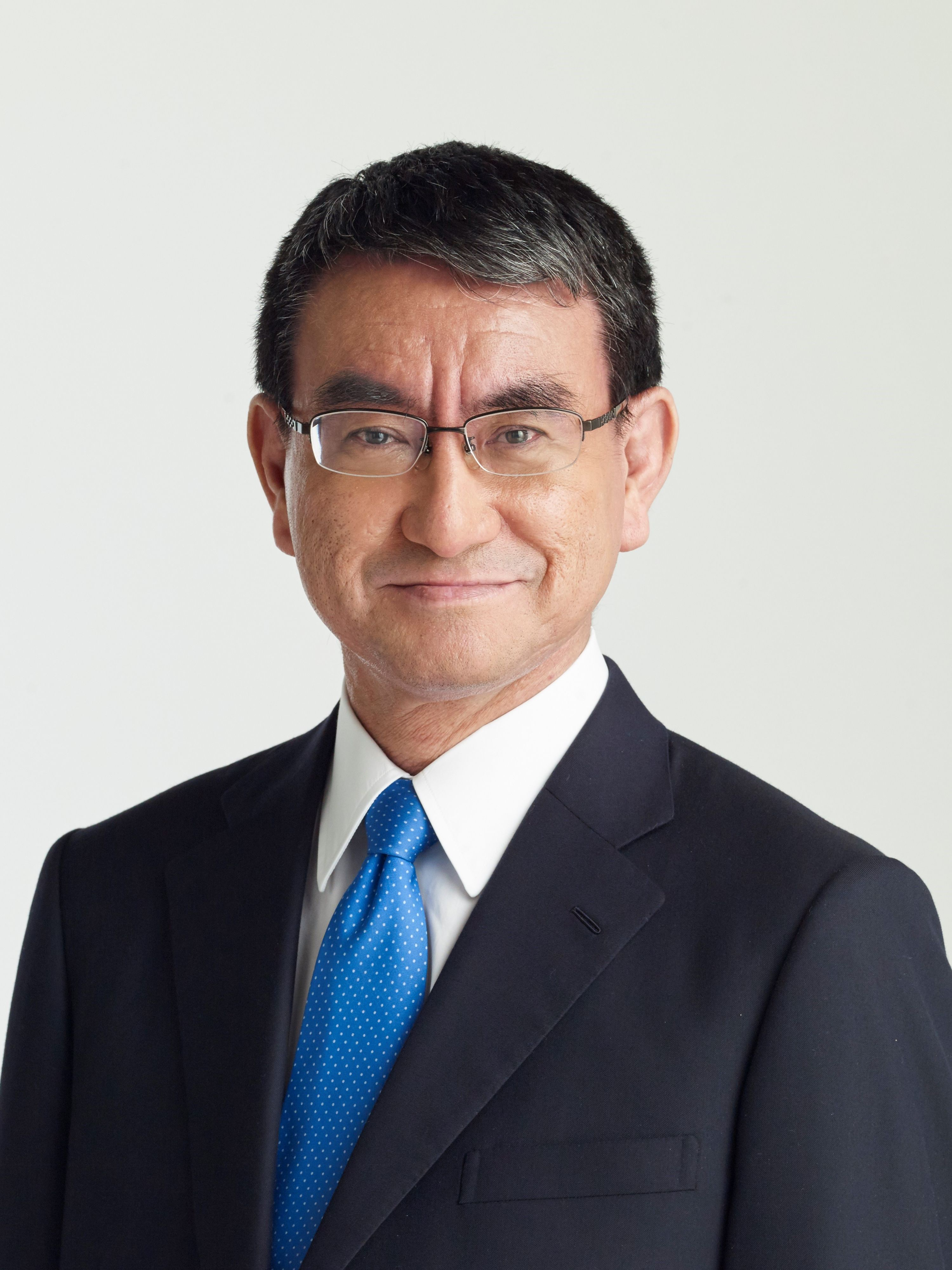
Kono's portrait as Minister for Administrative Reform

Suga kept Kono in his cabinet, returning him to the position of Minister of State for Administrative Reform, while tapping Abe's younger brother Nobuo Kishi to succeed Kono as Defense Minister. The Nikkei described Kono as Suga's "point man for cutting red tape," as Suga announced that government waste and sectionalism would be addressed by Kono's team. Suga used Kono's new position as “drastic medicine” in an attempt to show his seriousness in the position. Commentator Michael Bosack described this post as a "downgrade" and "tantamount to a demotion," citing Kono's ambition to become prime minister as well as poor coordination of decisions with the party.

The day after he took office, Kono opened a suggestion box for administrative reform on his official website. Although he stated that he would "read everything" that was sent to him, it was so inundated with comments that he suspended it the next day. He re-established the suggestion box on the Cabinet Office website on 25 September as the "Regulatory Reform and Administrative Reform Hotline" so that comments would be sent via the government, but the volume of comments did not stop, and he suspended accepting comments again on 27 November. One comment suggested the complete free use of highways for ambulances, at the request of Gunma Prefecture Governor Ichita Yamamoto, but there were also concerns that this would lead to an increase in the burden on each ministry and agency, an issue that Kono himself had raised.

On 7 January 2021, Japan declared a state of emergency in Tokyo over the COVID-19 pandemic. On 18 January, Suga announced that Kono would be in charge of overseeing the administration of the COVID-19 vaccine in Japan. Kono was responsible for coordinating with the Ministry of Health, Labor and Welfare and other relevant government agencies, as well as pharmaceutical companies, medical associations, pharmaceutical wholesalers, and logistics companies. He became known as Japan's "Vaccine Czar" during his tenure, a name he embraced when facing questions in the Diet. Kono announced on 20 January that Pfizer had agreed to a vaccine supply contract with the Japanese government. By the end of his term, nearly 70% of Japan's population received at least one dose of the vaccine.

=== 2021 Liberal Democratic leadership election ===
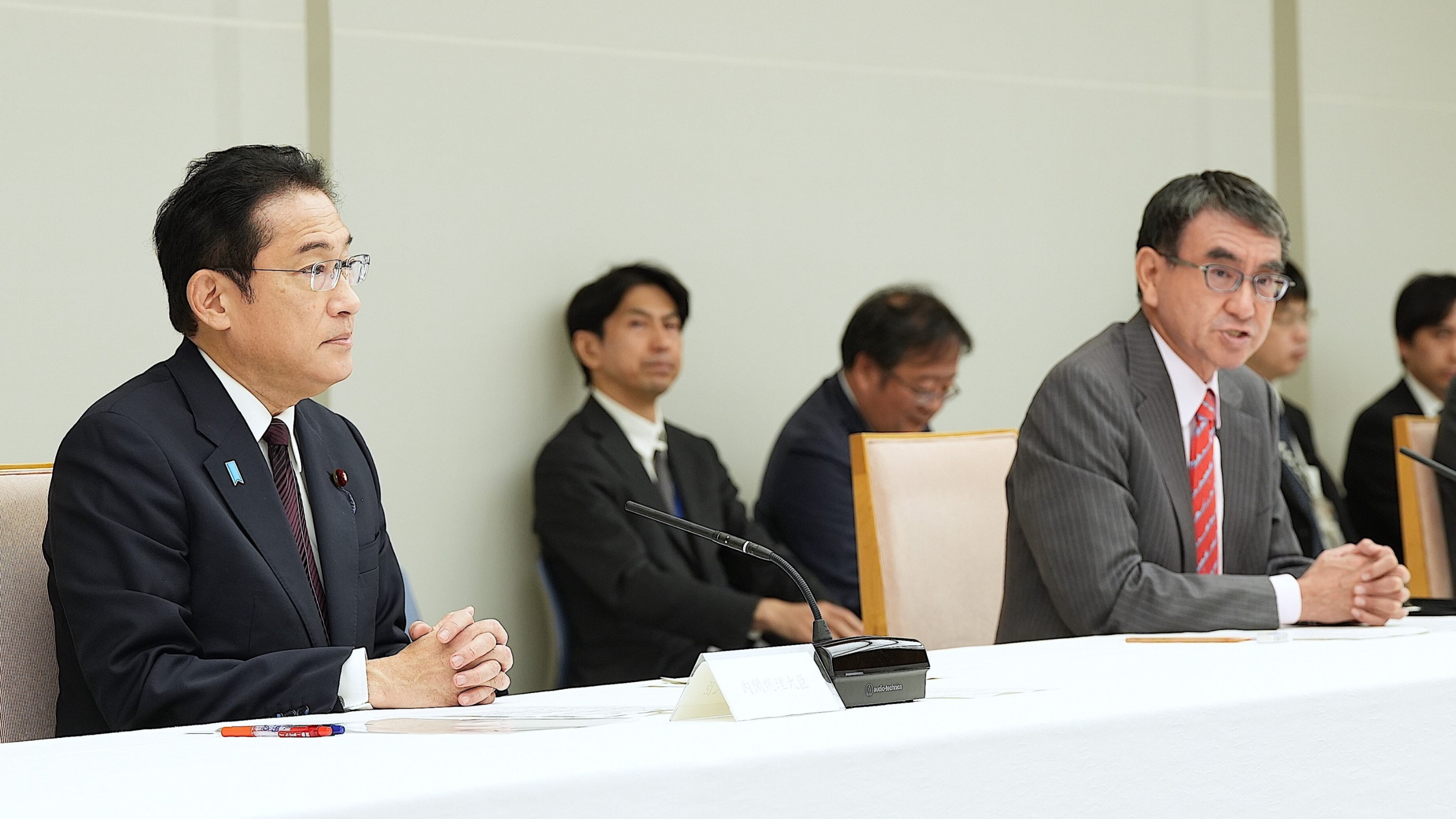
Fumio Kishida defeated Taro Kono in a runoff for the LDP leadership election in September 2021. He later appointed Kono to his cabinet in August 2022.

By August 2021, Suga was facing low approval ratings, dropping to as low as 28%. On 3 September 2021, Suga, who had initially announced plans to run for a second term as LDP President in July, announced that he would not seek re-election as head of the party. That same day, Kono confirmed his candidacy for the Liberal Democratic Party Presidency in the subsequent 2021 leadership election, formally announcing on 10 September. Japanese media reported that Kono was Suga's first choice for a successor. However, according to journalist Kenji Goto, Deputy Prime Minister Taro Aso, who led Kono's faction in the Diet, did not support Kono's candidacy, viewing it as too early.

Kono received endorsements from Environment Minister Shinjiro Koizumi and former party Secretary-General Shigeru Ishiba, who were both seen as reformists voices within the party. The trio formed an informal alliance, which President magazine stated could break Abe’s "dominance" over the party. When the three met on 19 September to discuss regional revitalization, Ishiba described Kono’s campaign as a “battle against the old LDP”.

He faced backlash for blocking his critics on Twitter during the election cycle. He stated that this was an attempt to protect himself from online abuse. The hashtag "Blocked by Mr. Kono" was trending as a result.

On 29 September, Kono made it into the second round run off with Fumio Kishida, and lost with 170 votes to Kishida's 257 votes. Kishida subsequently appointed Kono to be the LDP's Public Relations chief on 1 October 2021. Kono resigned from the cabinet 3 days later, ending his tenure as Minister for Administrative Reform.

=== Kishida government ===
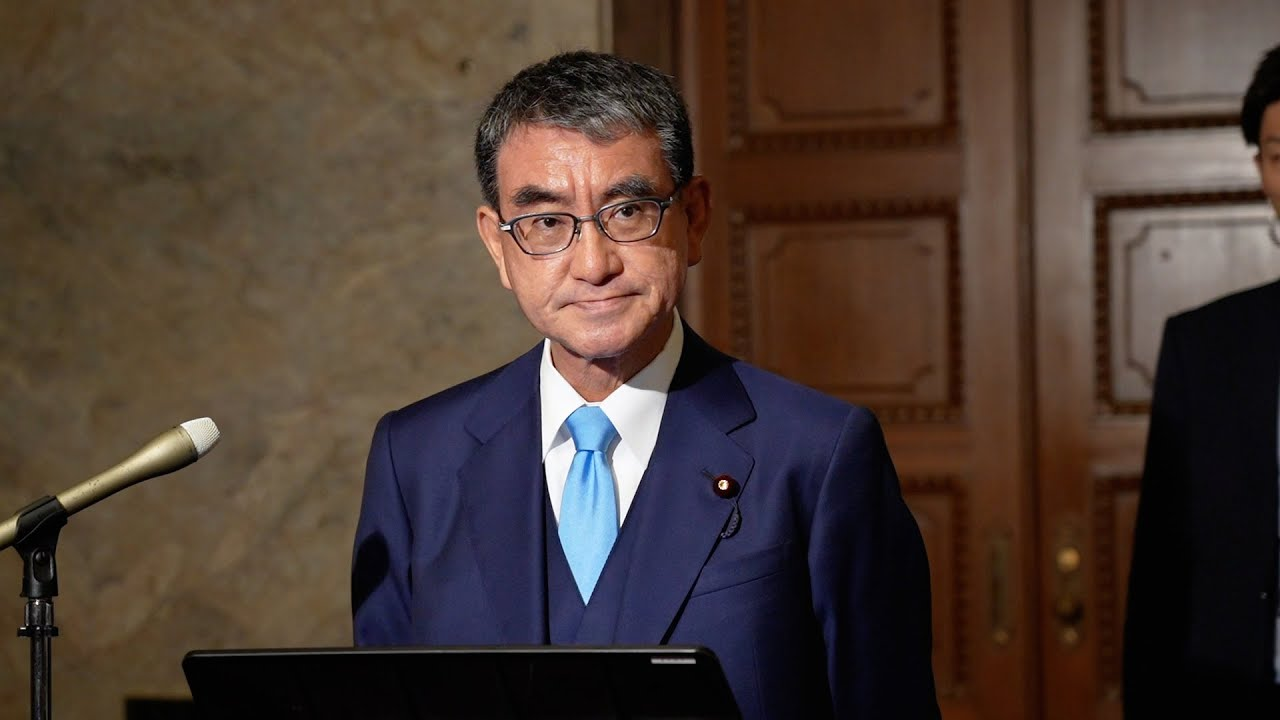
Kono Taro during a press conference on 27 October 2023.

After Kishida became party president and eventually prime minister, he led the party the victory in the 2021 general election, with the LDP winning 261 seats. Kono himself performed well in his Kanagawa constituency, receiving nearly 80% of the vote, setting a new record for the most votes received under the single-seat constituency system. After the election, Kishida formed his second cabinet in November 2021, in which Kono was not a member. During this interlude, Kono became a backbencher in the Diet.

On 8 July 2022, former prime minister Shinzo Abe was assassinated while delivering a campaign speech in Nara, two days before elections for the House of Councilors. While not politically motivated, the killing shocked many in Japan. Kono said he was "deeply shocked and saddened" by the assassination. He further stated it was an honor to have served under Abe, who he referred to as a "great leader." Kono also promised to "carry out his last wishes and do my utmost to realize a free and open Indo-Pacific."

==== Minister for Digital Transformation ====
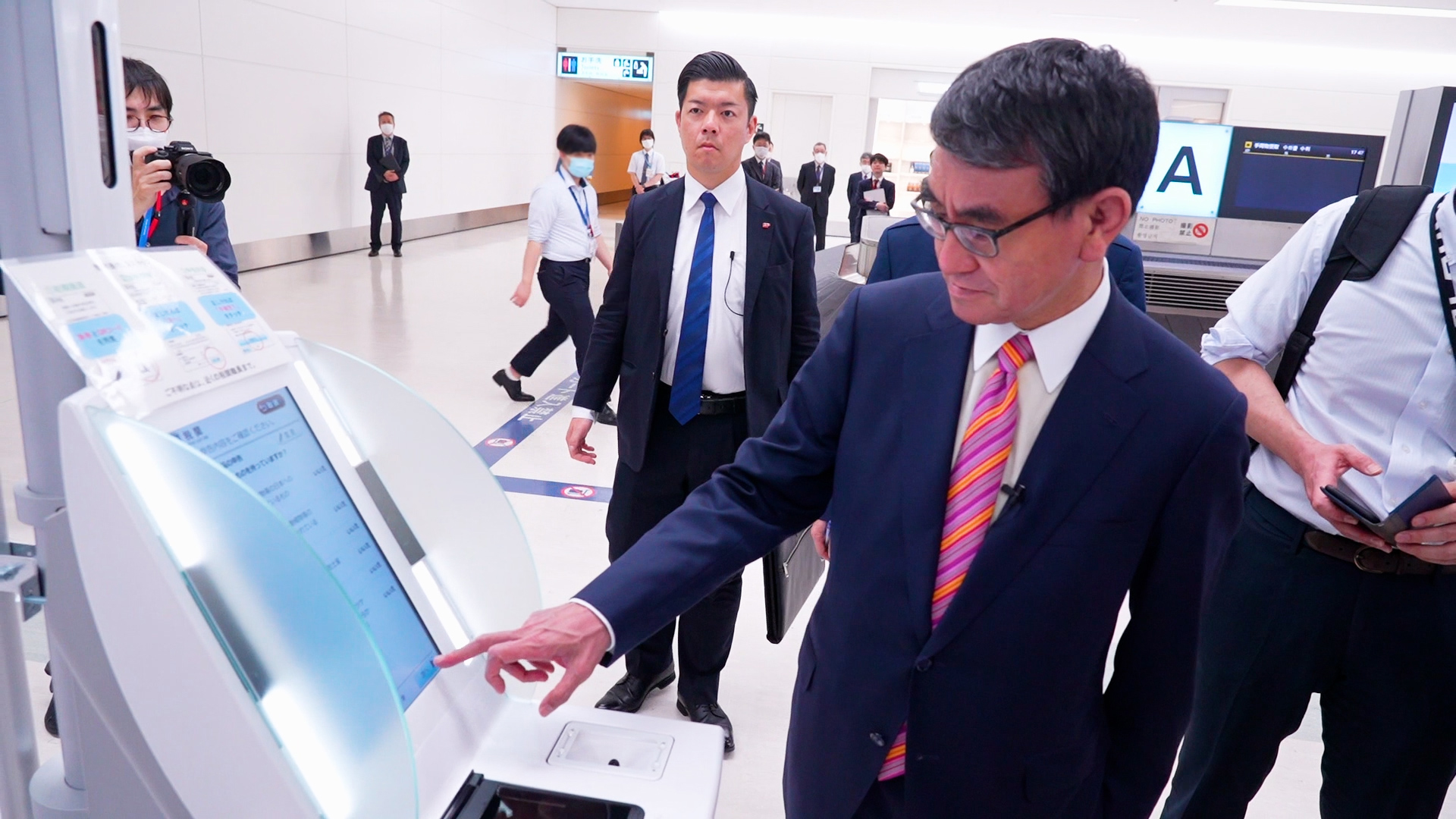
Kono Taro inspecting immigration services at Haneda Airport.

The assassination of Abe revealed ties between the LDP and the Unification Church, a South Korean new religious movement. The suspect in the killing, Tetsuya Yamagami, said he was motivated by a grudge against the Church and Abe's friendly relationship with it. In the wake of the assassination, and in an attempt to regain trust from the public, Kishida reshuffled his second cabinet for the first time in August 2022. On 10 August 2022, Kono was appointed as the Minister for Digital Transformation (also known as the Minister of Digital Affairs). He was also concurrently appointed as the Minister of State for Digital Reform, Minister of State for Consumer Affairs and Food Safety and Minister of State for the National Civil Service System. As an MP, Kono supported a law to provide relief to victims of the Unification Church, based in South Korea.

In October 2022, researchers from Osaka University unveiled a robotic avatar of Kono after being in development for two years. He joked that he could “send my avatar to various places and talk without having to go there myself.”

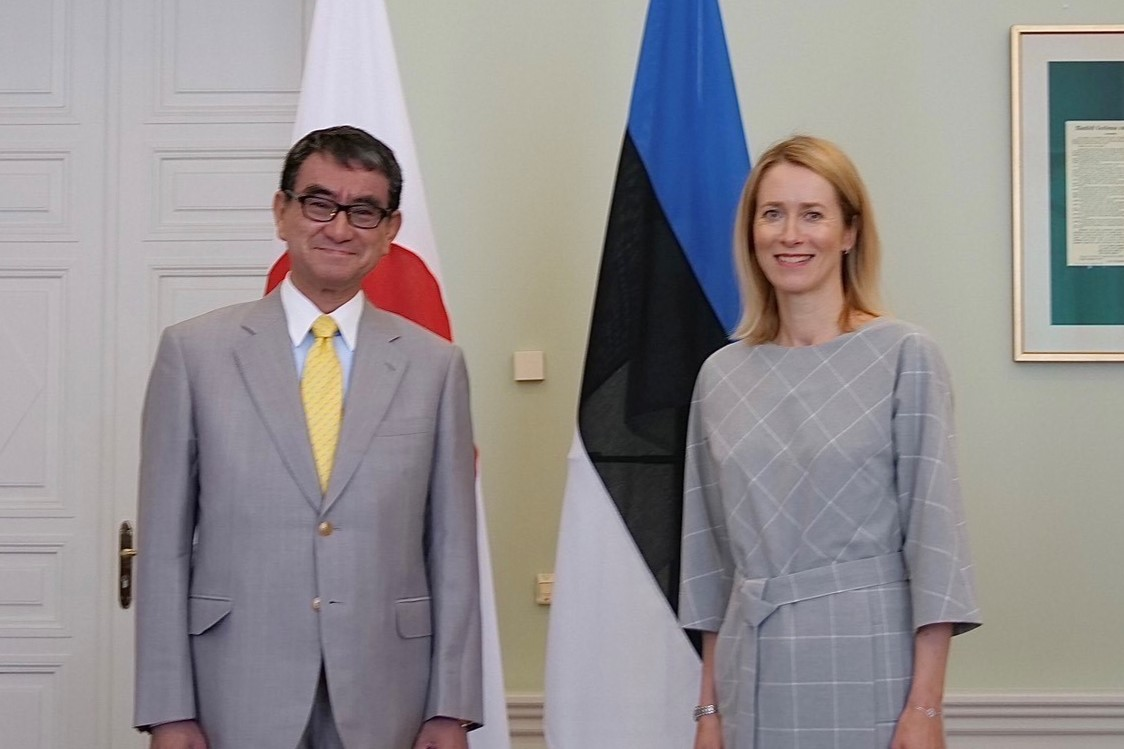
Kono with Estonian Prime Minister Kaja Kallas.

Shortly after his appointment, Kono attempted to revive the My Number identification card system, established in 2016. Reportedly, the Kishida government aimed to have almost all residents obtain the card by March 2023; Kono said that health insurance cards would be phased out in 2024, and instead be merged with the My Number cards. The program had to be temporarily paused in May 2023 due to 13 confirmed cases of another person's information being displayed when the card was used. Mistakes attributed to human error that were made before Kono's tenure caused some 7,000 My Number accounts have been wrongly linked to other people's data. In June 2023, a review of My Number data revealed that around 130,000 cards have been linked to the bank accounts of other people. Kono defended the system, and said he himself used a My Number card for his health insurance, but public trust in the project weakened. In July 2023, Kishida announced that the Personal Information Protection Commission (PIPC) would conduct investigation into the Digital Agency, prompting Kono to apologize to the Diet. A report published found that 20% of local governments followed the wrong procedures when linking My Number with disability records. In response, Kono voluntarily returned three months worth of his cabinet salary to the government in August 2023. By then, there were 940 cases involving errors in which bank accounts were linked to the wrong ID cards. The PIPC later stated that “systematic safety management measures needed to be improved”, and ordered Kono to report back on measures taken to improve the system by October 2023. The Diplomat reported in October that just 29% of people who have used the country's digital government services were satisfied with them.

In September 2023, Kishida reshuffled his second cabinet again, retaining Kono in his role as Digital Minister. Kono traveled to Singapore in June 2023 to discuss AI governance, data protection, and digitization of government services with Minister for Communications and Information Josephine Teo. When Kono said he would be embarking on a trip to northern Europe and the Middle East in July 2023, some party officials questioned his absence amid a review of the My Number card system. Kono led the cross-ministerial review body established to comprehensively inspect the system, which was preparing to issue its interim report in early August. Kono visited countries in Scandinavia, the Baltics, and the Middle East to exchange ideas on digitization.

In September 2022, Kono "declared war" on floppy disks, as part of his efforts to modernize the government. He said updated regulations would allow business owners and others to use online services instead. On 28 June 2024, Kono declared victory in the "war", announcing that the government had finally phased them out, and would no longer require them as a form of documentation. Up to 1,034 regulations were scrapped as part of the effort, leaving only 1 that remains in effect. Kono has also aimed to phase out the use of hanko stamps and fax machines in the government.

=== 2024 Liberal Democratic leadership election ===
The term of the LDP Presidency expired in September 2024, a little less than three years into Fumio Kishida's premiership. A poll conducted in September 2022 found Kono was the most popular choice to be Japan's next prime minister, surpassing Kishida, with 14% support. In May 2023, Kono didn't rule out a run for the party presidency. However by February 2024, Kono’s support among the public dropped considerably, receiving only 7% support in a poll that showed Shigeru Ishiba had 25% of respondents' support. Kono conveyed his desire to run for party leadership to LDP Vice President and his faction boss, Taro Aso, during dinner on 26 June 2024. Kono later said during a press conference that he had been waiting 28 years to become prime minister. Two days later, fellow centrist Shigeru Ishiba also voiced his intention to run for LDP President. On 2 July it was reported by the Yukan Fuji that Shinjiro Koizumi, another centrist long considered a potential prime minister, was considering running. On 10 August, Kono again conveyed his desire to run to Aso. He reportedly told him he would run with or without his support. On 14 August, Prime Minister Fumio Kishida announced he would not seek a second term as LDP President, making the race an open field. By 17 August, it was reported that Kono had secured the 20 endorsements needed to announce his own campaign.

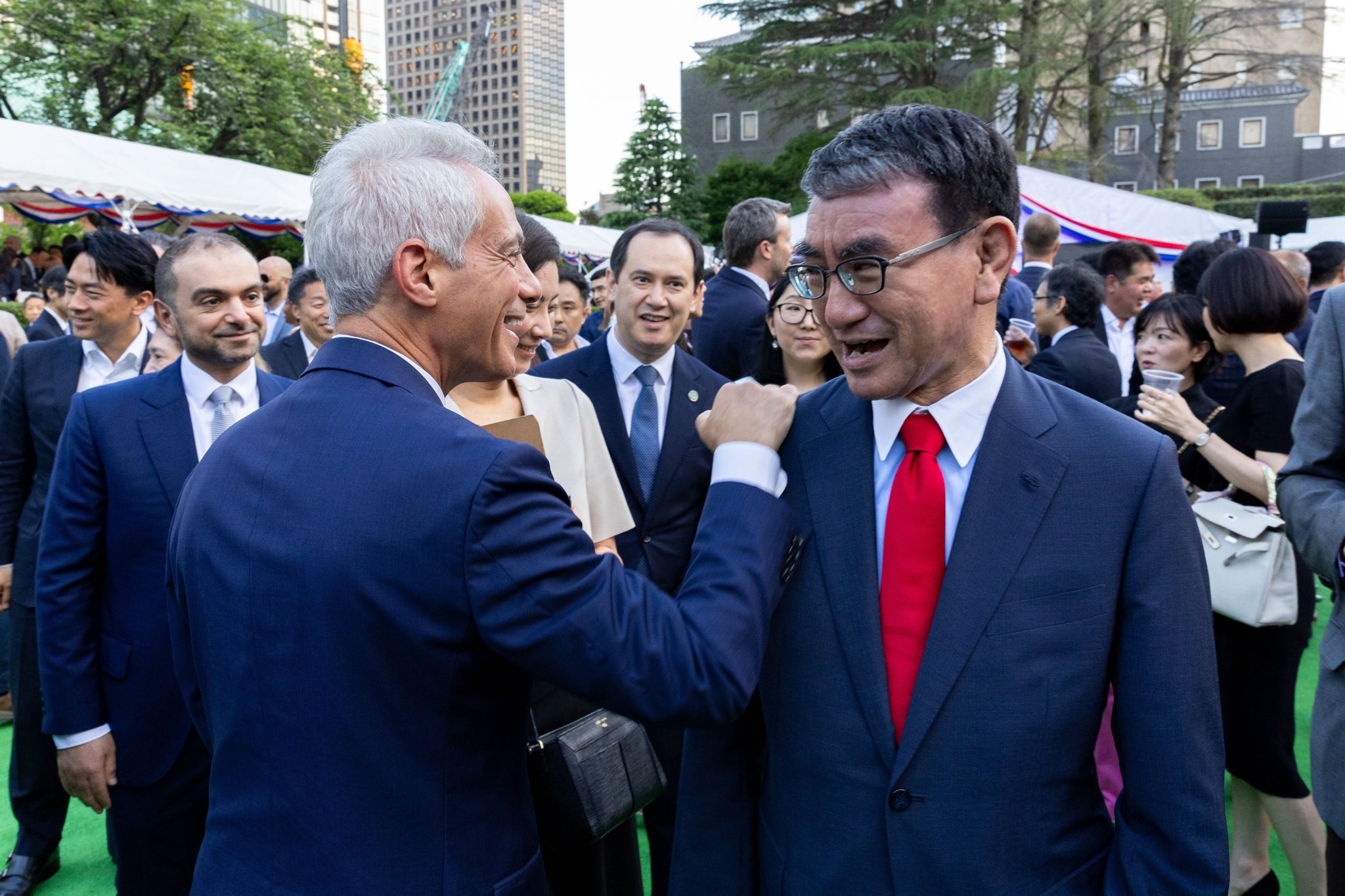
Kono with U.S. Ambassador to Japan Rahm Emanuel in June 2024

Kōno officially declared his candidacy in a press conference held on 26 August in Tokyo. He became the first sitting Cabinet minister to announce. In his press conference, he stated he wanted to "move the country forward" as leader. Kono also acknowledged that his "record on reform" would be put to the test during the election. On economic policy, he said he would return to "fiscal austerity" and called for budgetary discipline. He also said he would ask lawmakers implicated in the slush fund scandal to return any money. He also argued the Bank of Japan should increase interest rates to boost the value of the yen and bring down energy and food costs. On 6 September Kono stated that a Constitutional amendment concerning Article 9 should include "collective self-defense rights" beyond clearly stating the rights of the Self-Defense Forces. The previous day his campaign released a comprehensive policy vision, which included labor market reform, use of renewable energy, the creation of a digital safety net and lowering the age of candidacy to 18 years old.

The day after Kono's press conference announcing his campaign, Taro Aso told faction members that he would personally back Kono, but would allow members to support other candidates. Kono said the influence of factions within the LDP would not be considered when forming his cabinet, and also said he would leave the Aso faction were he to become Prime Minister. Kono was the only candidate in the race officially backed by a party faction, as most other factions had been dissolved after the slush fund scandal. He described reports of Aso supporting Sanae Takaichi as "election interference".

Kono’s support in the 2024 leadership race had diminished significantly since his previous campaign in 2021. Former Prime Minister Yoshihide Suga, who supported Kono in 2021, said he would support Koizumi. Koizumi had also supported Kono in 2021, along with Ishiba, but both had launched their own campaigns and would ultimately garner more support than Kono in 2024. The ‘Koizumi Factor’ complicated Kono’s campaign, as both hailed from Kanagawa Prefecture and competed for votes among reformists within the party. Neither candidate would advance to the runoff election between Takaichi and Ishiba, who was victorious and became Prime Minister in October 2024. Kono would come in eighth place in the election held on 27 September, garnering 22 votes among Diet members and 14,971 votes from party members. He placed above Katsunobu Katō, who came in last place after several of his initial recommenders voted for other candidates. The Japan Times attributed Kono’s decline in popularity to dissatisfaction with policies rolled out during his term as Digital Minister, as well as fading interest in his public image.

=== LDP Election Headquarters and backbencher ===
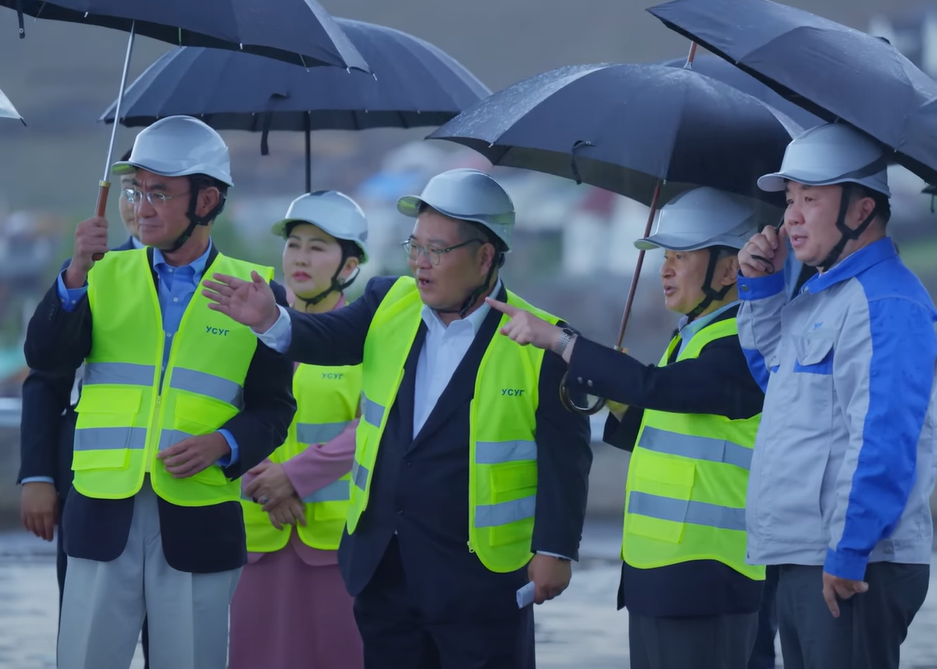
Kono with Emperor Naruhito during a state visit to Mongolia in July 2025.

After Ishiba's victory, Kono once again returned to the backbenches. In the 2024 general election called by Ishiba shortly after his leadership victory, Kono was victorious in his 10th consecutive re-election to the House of Representatives, albeit with a lower margin of victory than in previous elections. The LDP lost its majority in the lower house for the first time since 2009, although maintained a plurality of seats with the Komeito. On 15 November 2024, he began work at the LDP's Election Headquarters under Chairman Kihara Seiji.

In January 2025, it was announced that Kono was launching a study group focused on reforms to social security and welfare on 13 February.

During a state visit to Mongolia by the Emperor and Empress of Japan in July 2025, Kono served as the chief attendant to the Imperial Couple. He notably shared parts of the trip with his followers on Twitter.

After the LDP-Komeito coalition lost its majority in the July 2025 Upper House elections, Kono resigned as Deputy Chairman of the party's Election Strategy Committee. While believing Prime Minister Shigeru Ishiba had justification for remaining as LDP President and Prime Minister, considering ongoing trade and tariff negotiations with the second Trump Administration, Kono was critical of LDP Secretary-General Hiroshi Moriyama. In a statement, Kono urged Moriyama to resign after "the party has suffered two crushing defeats in national elections, the House of Representatives and the House of Councilors". Kihara Seiji later resigned as Election Strategy Chairman on 22 July. The following day, it was falsely reported that Ishiba would resign as Prime Minister and LDP President in late August, which he denied the same day.

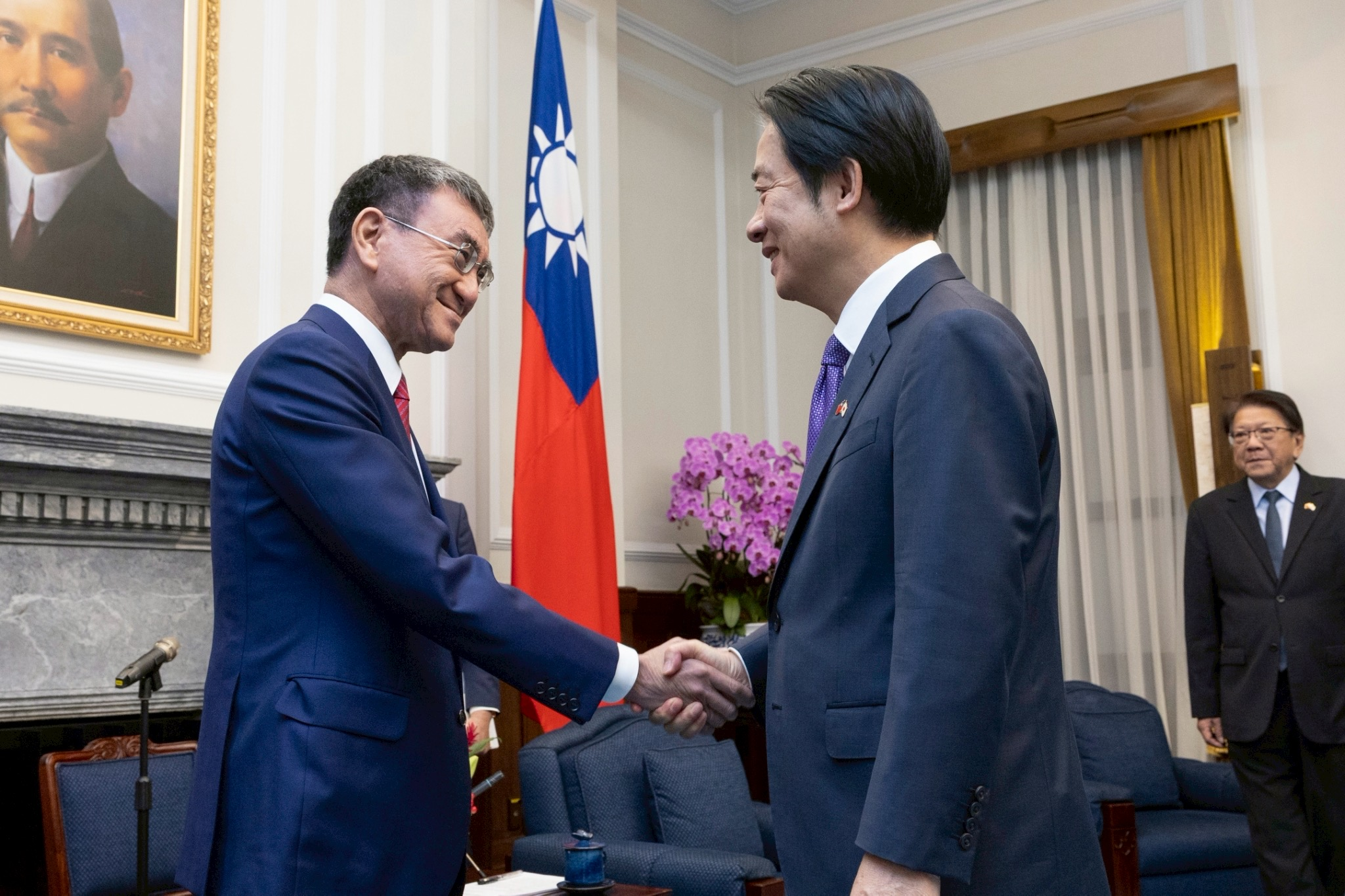
Kono meeting with Taiwanese President William Lai in December 2025.

After more than a month of internal pressure from within the party, culminating with the possibility of an emergency presidential election, Ishiba announced his resignation as party president on 7 September 2025. Two days later, when asked on Bloomberg's The Asia Trade if he would run in the subsequent LDP leadership election, Kono said "I'm sleeping on it." He ultimately decided against running, endorsing Agriculture Minister Shinjiro Koizumi instead. As Koizumi was attempting to appeal to more conservatives within the party, Kono's endorsement was seen as helping legitimize his moderate image and reformist roots. Ultimately, Koizumi was defeated in a runoff by Sanae Takaichi, who became party president and later prime minister that October.

In late December 2025, Kono embarked on a visit to Taiwan, meeting with Foreign Minister Lin Chia-lung and President William Lai.

In the February 2026 general election, Kono was victrious in his home constituecny in Kanagawa, winning 62.5% of the vote. The following month, Kono was appointed chief of the International Bureau in the LDP. On 30 July, he expressed opposition to Takaichi’s plan to cut the consumption tax to 1% in 2027 and 2028. He instead favored cash handouts to alleviate the impact of the cost of living, but warned that a loss of confidence in Japan’s public finances could weaken the yen even further and push interest rates higher.

== Political views ==
Kono is commonly dubbed a political "maverick" and is known for expressing his views on politically sensitive issues. Unlike prime ministers Shinzo Abe, Yoshihide Suga, Fumio Kishida, Shigeru Ishiba, and Sanae Takaichi, and most of their respective cabinet ministers, Kono is not affiliated with the ultraconservative organization Nippon Kaigi. Kono is opposed to the LDP moving further to the right or the "extreme right wing", and believes it should remain a center or center-right party.

=== Social issues ===
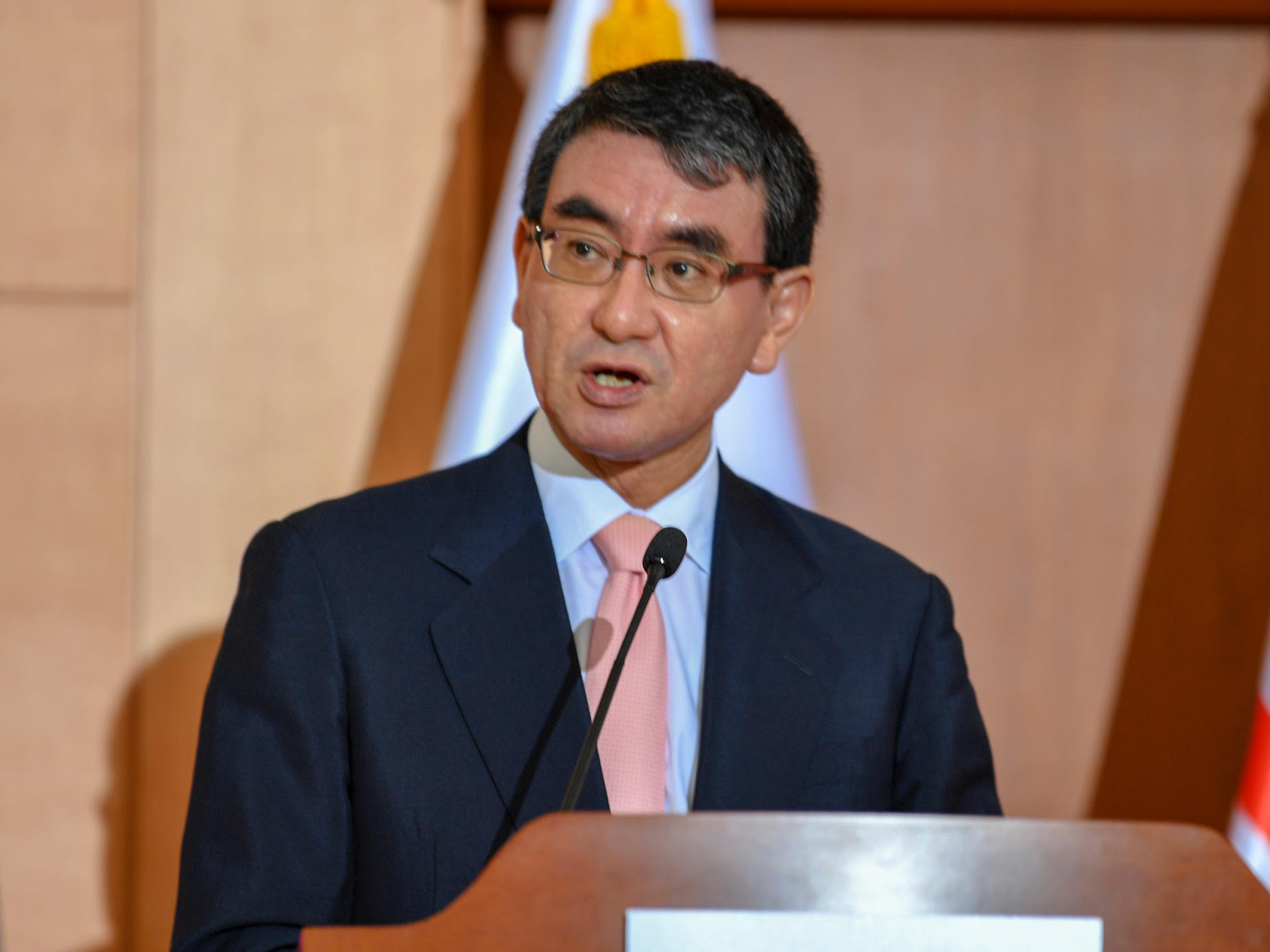
Kono delivering a speech in Seoul, South Korea, in June 2018.

Taro Kono supports legalising same-sex marriage and allowing married couples to have separate surnames.

He established a House subcommittee on genetically modified organisms in 1997 and supported new labeling rules on GMOs.

Kono has said that he would not visit Yasukuni Shrine if he was ever made prime minister, although he visits the shrine at present because he has relatives who died in the war. Kono believes that the best way for Japan to limit political backlash from their surrounding neighbors is to build a new shrine, arguing it would make it easier for the Emperor and the prime minister to pay their respects. Kono believes that building a new shrine will de-escalate tension from Japan's neighbors. The Emperor does not currently visit Yasukuni Shrine, which honors 14 Class-A-War criminals, and no Emperor has visited since 1978.

In March 2019, Kono publicly made the proposal to end the common practice of expressing Japanese names in English or other foreign languages in the Western way, i.e. given name followed by family name, and to return to the Japanese traditional practice of putting the family name first. He stated that the start of the new Reiwa Japanese era name and the coming 2020 Summer Olympics to be held in Japan provide timely opportunities for initiating a reversal. Japan adopted on its own initiative the Western way of expressing names at the end of the 19th century, under the initiative of Meiji era reformers.

=== Energy and economy ===
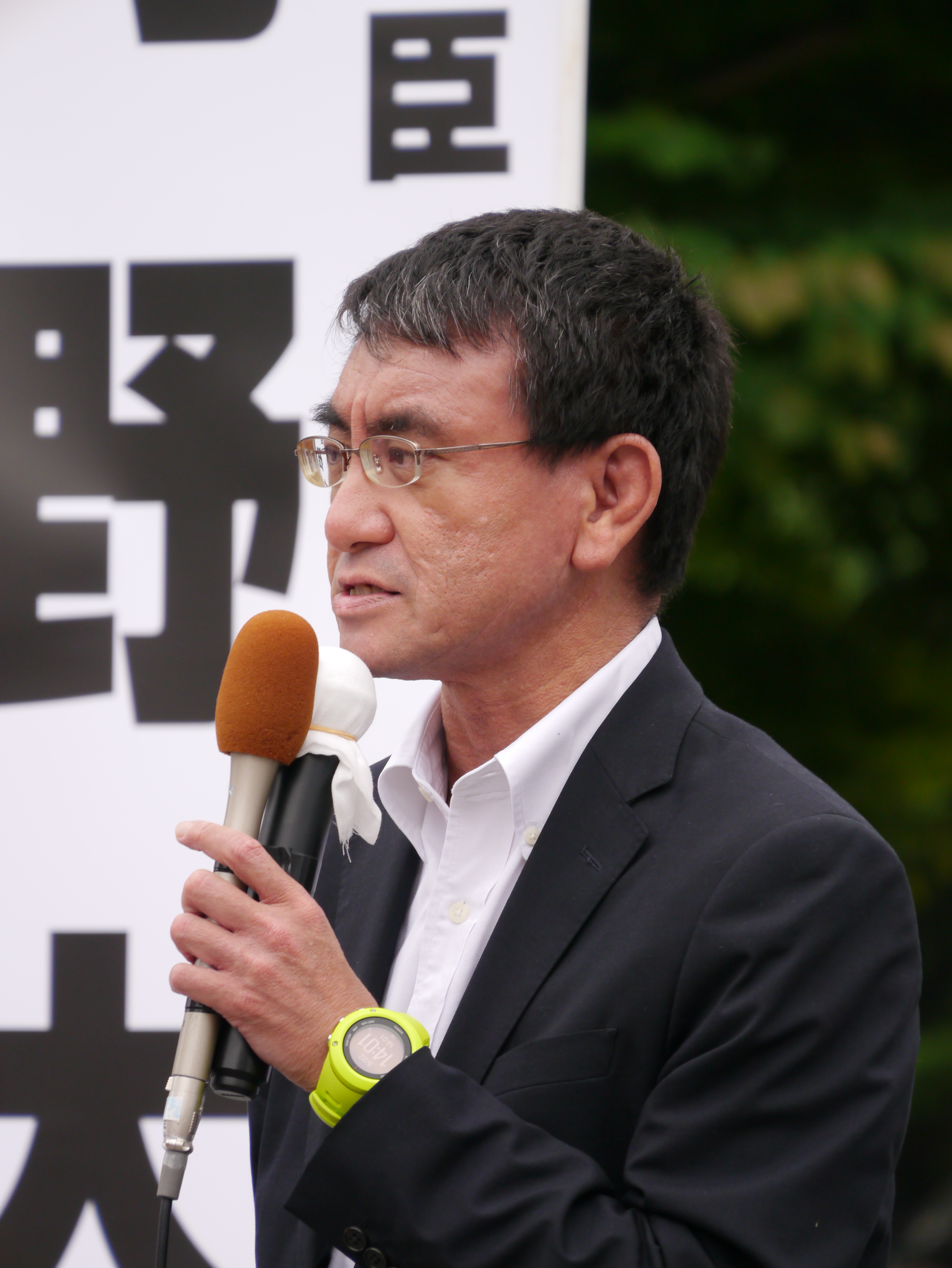
Kono speaking at Center-Kita Station in 2016.

He opposes the government's nuclear policy, especially plans to pursue the nuclear fuel cycle and to build new power stations. Before serving as Foreign Minister, Kono was on record as saying he would like the Japanese Government to curtail its reliance on nuclear energy going forward. He specifically opposed Government plans to build new nuclear reactors. Kono also believes Japan needs to be more prudent about the dangers of nuclear energy in the aftermath of the Fukushima Nuclear Explosion by limiting the number of years already operational nuclear stations are free to operate, "Kono has said he wants Japan to commit to phasing out nuclear power by shutting down reactors when they reach 40 years of service, contrasting the government's policy of maintaining its nuclear reactors as a core energy source". Kono believes that nuclear explosions and contamination are not the only dangers that result from Japan's reliance on nuclear energy: "We've been depending on the nuclear energy so much,"... "It's not the policy choice. It's because of those bureaucrats and the power company and the politician got some vested interest in promoting nuclear". Following his appointment as Foreign Minister on 3 August 2017, Kono has taken a partisan approach to nuclear energy policies. On 7 October 2015, he was asked at his inaugural news conference whether he would retain his criticism of Abe's nuclear policy, Kono said he was "going in the same direction" as his boss.

He has supported raising the consumption tax rate to 8 percent, with the funds to be directed towards the National Pension.

Kono advocates for more immigration, having criticized the government's resistance to opening the door to immigrants in order to mitigate Japan's labor shortage as a result of its aging and shrinking population.

=== Imperial family ===
In August 2020, Kono defended that matrilineal emperors, whose fathers have no bloodline connection with past emperors, should be considered to maintain stable succession of the Imperial Throne. He further proposed that it should be "possible that Imperial princesses (children or grandchildren of an emperor), including Princess Aiko (the daughter of Emperor Naruhito), could be accepted as the next emperor. He argued that under the current succession rules it would be difficult to allure any potential bride for the male heir, who would face enormous psychological pressure to become pregnant with a boy. Kono also questioned a proposal suggested by some conservative members of the Liberal Democratic Party to reinstate members of former Imperial branch households to maintain patrilineal lineage succession, saying, "There will be a need to have discussions whether the people of Japan will truly accept reinstating those who were separated from the Imperial Family some 600 years ago."

=== Foreign policy ===
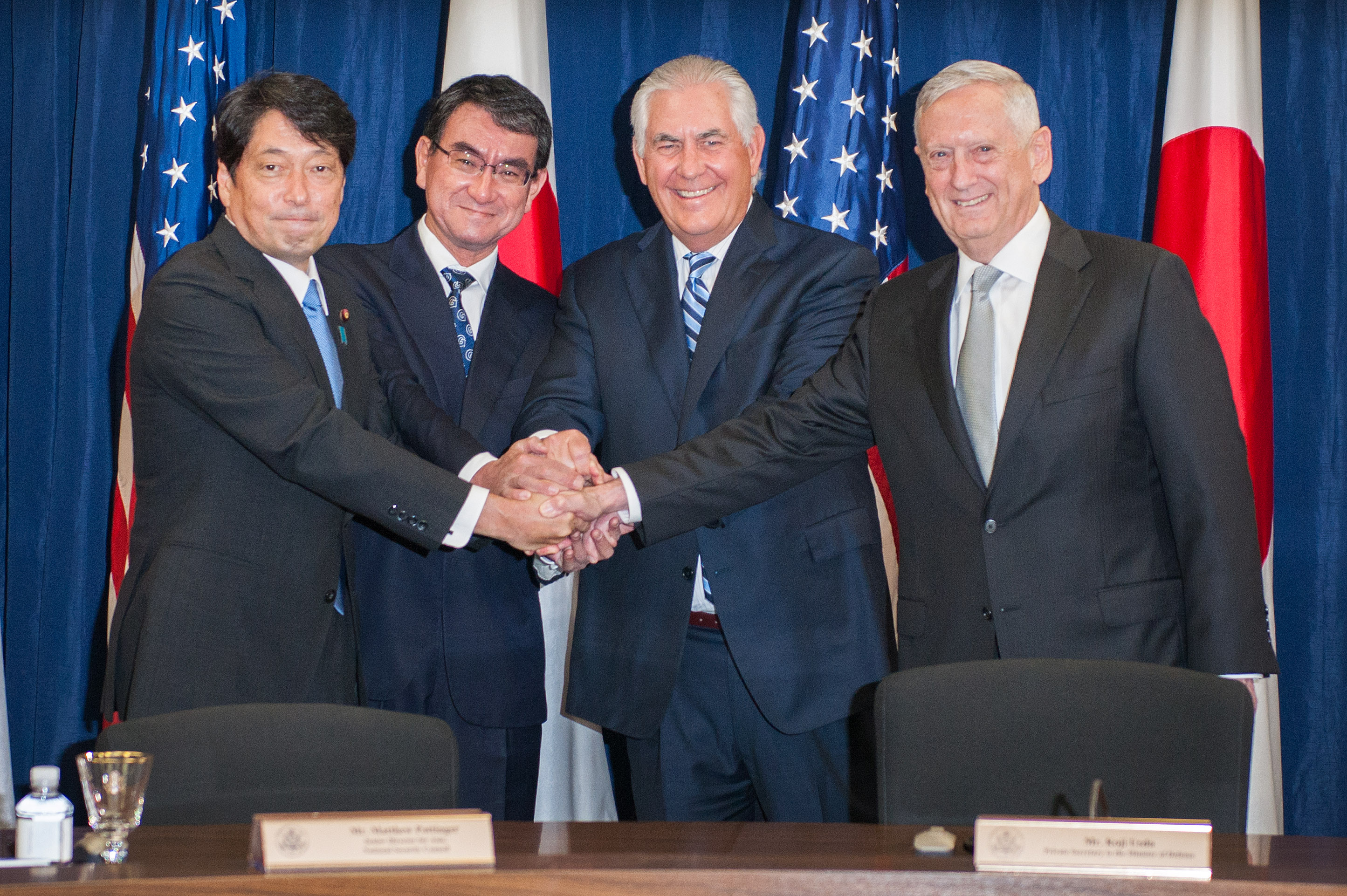
Kono with Defense Minister Itsunori Onodera, US Secretary of State Rex Tillerson and US Secretary of Defense Jim Mattis in 2017.

Kono is considered to be an Asia-Centrist and has strong and friendly ties with the United States. Kono has long been an emphatic proponent of reinvigorating the alliance between South Korea and Japan, stating "We need an Asia-Centric policy that considers at the same time Japan's national interests and the interests of surrounding nations, and the focus of that is between Japan and Korea". The fixation on Asia-Centrism by Kono directly contrasts with the stance of most LDP politicians, who heavily stress Japan's relationship with the United States of America. Kono would like to entwine a greater business and economic relationship between the two nations. Kono is on record as saying, "I understand the problem as one in which Korea and Japan must pool their strength so that they might survive in the changing global environment".

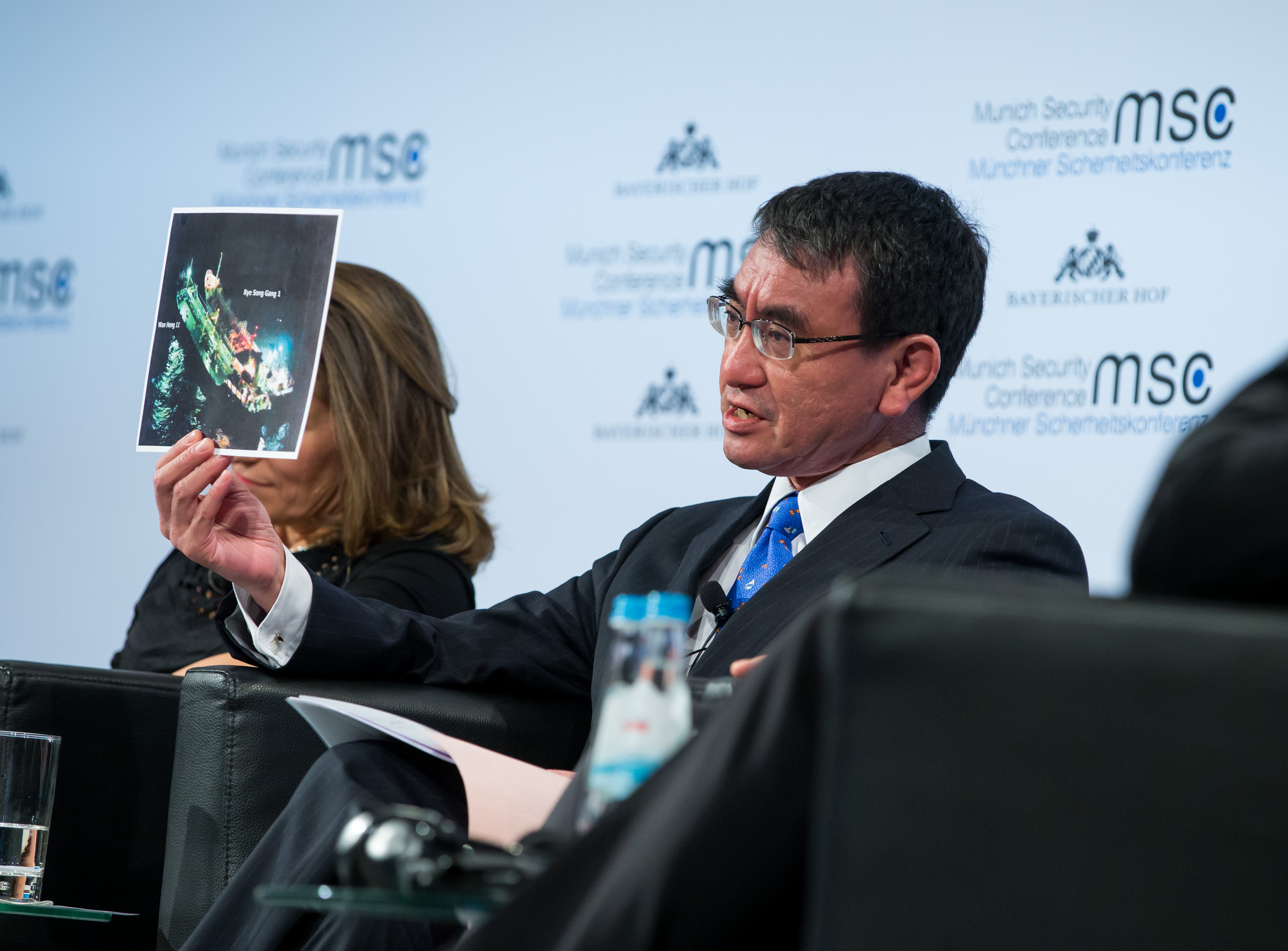
Kono at the Munich Security Conference in 2018.

Kono has taken several steps to forging a more vigorous relationship between Japan and Korea. Kono co-sponsored a bill which now allows direct air service between Gimpo, South Korea and Haneda airport in Tokyo. Kono hopes that the direct flight between the two popular cities will make for easier travel by businessmen voyaging between the nations. Kono hopes that the less-restrictive travel process will give rise to increased commerce between the two nations. Kono, however, still believes there is much more work to be done to help generate more commerce between the two nations. Kono would like to see the extension of short terms visas up to three months from Korean nationals doing business in Japan. He is the only Japanese lawmaker who runs a Korean webpage, and provides internships to Korean nationals. One of his Korean interns went on to become the Consul-General of South Korea in Kobe.

Kono has neither endorsed nor rejected his father's famous Kono Statement, which acknowledged the Japanese military's use of comfort women during World War II.

He supports amendment of Article 9 of the Japanese Constitution, allowing the Self-Defense Forces to engage in warfare. He supports the Japan-U.S. Security Treaty, but seeks revision of the Status of Forces Agreement (SOFA) On the issue of the U.S. Marine Corps Air Station in the Okinawan city of Futenma, Kono's "off the record" views "conflict with the official Japanese position."

He opposes donation of development aid to any countries that have failed to ratify the Comprehensive Nuclear-Test-Ban Treaty.

In May 2023, he announced support for Japan eventually joining AUKUS, hoping that "maybe AUKUS could one day become JAUKUS."

== Personal life ==
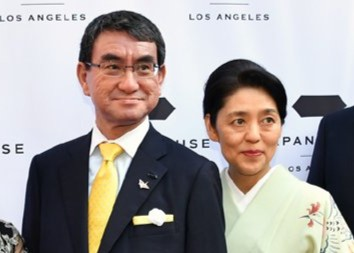
Kono with his wife, Kaori, at the reopening of Japan House Los Angeles in August 2018.

Kono is married to Kaori, also a returnee (Kikokushijo) who had studied in Australia. The couple has a son, Ippei, born in 2002. The couple enjoy scuba diving and going to the movies.

In 2002, when his father, Yōhei Kōno, fell ill from a chronic hepatitis C infection, Kono offered a part of his liver for donation. His father initially refused the offer, but eventually relented and accepted; in April 2002, Kono donated part of his liver to his father in a 15-hour operation. Kono has since supported changes to the law regarding organ donation.

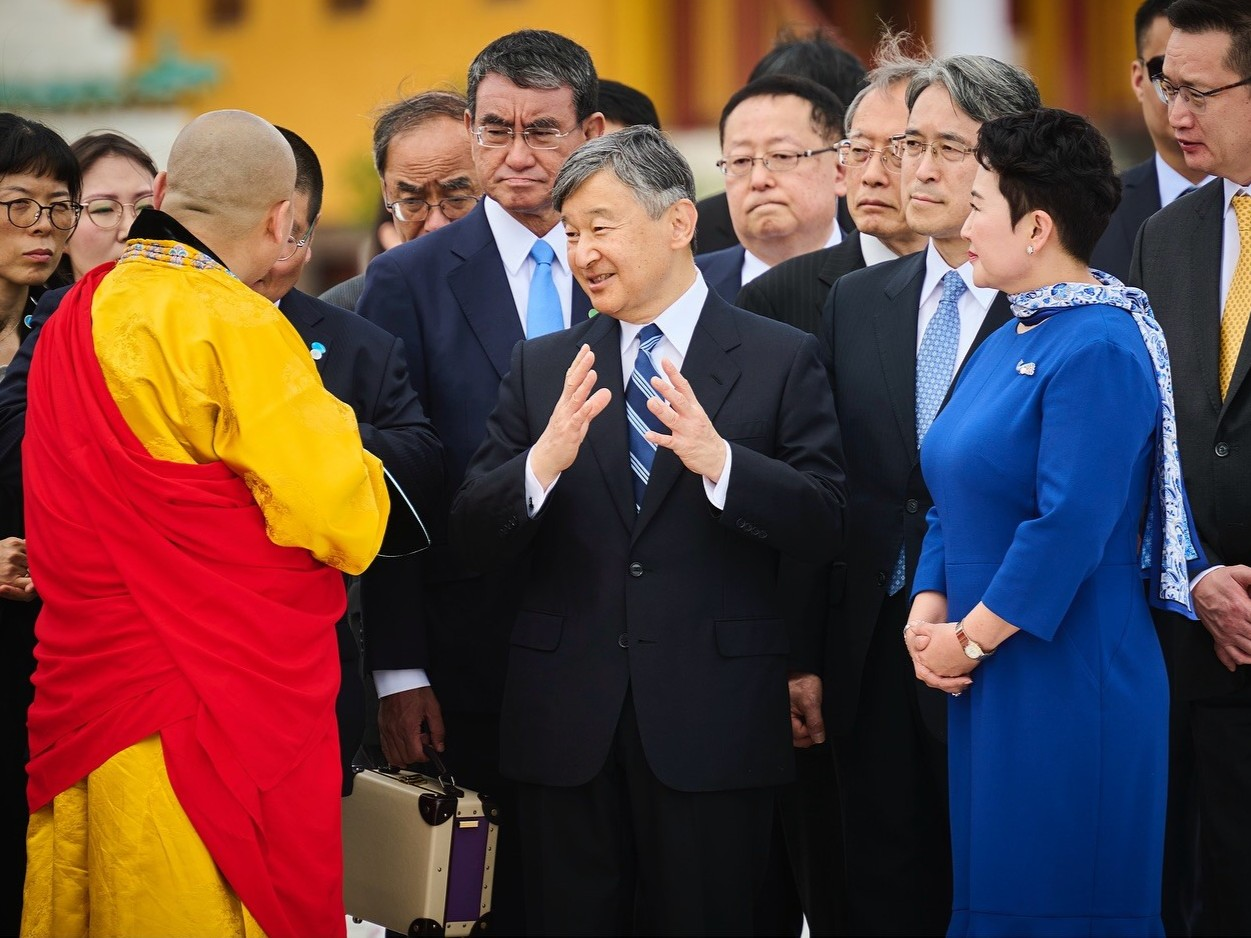
Kono holding his purple briefcase during an Imperial visit to Mongolia in July 2025.

Kono is a fan of Shonan Bellmare, a professional football club based in his home town of Hiratsuka, west of Kanagawa. He was chairman of the team between 2000 and 2005, and has been credited with returning the team to the top division. Additionally, Kono has been involved in a number of bodies managing professional sports. He is Chairman of the Japan Race Horse Association, which organizes Japan's largest yearling sales. He is also President of the Kanagawa Triathlon Union, the Kanagawa Track and Field Association, and the Hiratsuka Baseball Association. He also taught a graduate class at Hosei University.

Kono's favorite food is durian. He was named the Honorary Chairman of the Japan Durian Promotion Association when it was established in January 2020. He is known for wearing suspenders and carrying a purple briefcase; TIME magazine described Kono as a "lovable eccentric" in 2023. He is also known for his prolific use of Twitter, where he has 2.5 million followers on his Japanese account as of 2024.

On 27 November 2023, Kono was reprimanded for attempting to use a smartphone to answer questions during committee deliberations. He was attempting to respond to a question posed by House of Councilors member Kiyomi Tsujimoto of the CDP concerning the identity of the Foreign Minister in March 2019 (Kono himself was Foreign Minister at the time), when he was told to put his phone away by Shinsuke Suematsu, the chair of the committee. The incident attracted significant attention.

== Electoral history ==
Kono was first elected to the House of Representatives in the 1996 general election, representing Kanagawa 15th district, at the age of thirty-three years old. Kono is a very popular candidate winning Kanagawa's 15th district seat in nine consecutive elections.

1996
Party	Candidate	Votes	%	±%
Liberal Democratic	Taro Kono	84,723	36.44	New
New Frontier	Koichiro Katsumata	71,426	30.72	New
Democratic	Mitsuo Tomizuka	47,506	20.43	New
Communist	Kazuo Yamamoto	28,820	12.40	New
Turnout				

In the 2000 general election, Kono achieved reelection by winning 120,001 votes, which was good for 47.4 percent of the votes cast in his district.

2000
Party	Candidate	Votes	%	±%
Liberal Democratic	Taro Kono (Incumbent)	120,001	47.44	
Democratic	Takeshi Suzuki	56,943	22.51	New
Social Democratic	Etsuko Yamanaka	39,636	15.67	New
Communist	Tadashi Mikami	24,355	9.63	
Liberal League	Yoko Shimizu	12,012	4.75	New
Turnout				
LDP hold				

In the 2003 general election, Kono received 125,067 votes, which accounted for 55.4 percent of the votes cast in his district.

2003
Party	Candidate	Votes	%	±%
Liberal Democratic	Taro Kono (Incumbent)	148,955	59.89	
Democratic	Fumihiko Sakai	76,967	30.95	
Communist	Sadao Yoshii	16,122	6.48	
Independent	Hidemitsu Katsura	6,674	2.68	New
Turnout				
LDP hold				

In the 2005 general election, Kono won 186,770 votes, or 63.9 percent of the votes cast in his district.

2005
Party	Candidate	Votes	%	±%
Liberal Democratic	Taro Kono (Incumbent)	186,770	63.88	
Democratic	Koichiro Katsumata	83,490	28.55	
Communist	Takuya Nishiwaki	22,139	7.57	
Turnout				
LDP hold				

In the 2009 general election, Kono received 163,470 votes, which was good for 53.3 percent of the votes cast in his district.

2009
Party	Candidate	Votes	%	±%
Liberal Democratic	Taro Kono (Incumbent)	163,470	53.25	
Democratic	Koichiro Katsumata (elected by Minami Kanto PR block)	124,414	40.52	
Communist	Takuya Nishiwaki	15,786	5.14	
Happiness Realization	Yusaku Hamada	3,341	1.09	New
Turnout				
LDP hold				

In the 2012 general election, Kono received 192,604 votes winning nearly eighty percent of the vote in his district, 79.98%. This is his largest margin of victory as a Representative.

2012
Party	Candidate	Votes	%	±%
Liberal Democratic	Taro Kono (Incumbent)	192,604	79.98	
Communist	Yuka Asaka	48,198	20.02	
Turnout				
LDP hold				

In the 2014 general election, Kono did not win by quite as large of a margin. In 2014, Kono received 155,388 votes, which yielded him 68 percent of the vote in his district. Nevertheless, Kono received a large number of votes and won elections by sweeping margins.

2014
Party	Candidate	Votes	%	±%
Liberal Democratic	Taro Kono (Incumbent)	155,388	66.79	
Independent	Toichiro Ikeda	39,211	16.85	
Communist	Tokumitsu Numagami	38,068	16.36	
Registered electors		456,896		
Turnout			52.75	
LDP hold				

Kono fared well in the 2017 general election, winning re-election by an overwhelming margin; Kono won 159,647 votes, improving his margin of victory by ~1%.

2017
Party	Candidate	Votes	%	±%
Liberal Democratic	Taro Kono (Incumbent)	159,647	67.63	
Social Democratic	Katsumi Sasaki	38,242	16.20	
Kibō no Tō	Ryosuke Nogi	38,162	16.17	New
Registered electors		469,287		
Turnout			51.42	▼1.33
LDP hold				

In the 2021 general election, Kono won 210,515 votes, or 79.32%. This is Kono's second ever largest margin of victory after 2012.

2021
Party	Candidate	Votes	%	±%
Liberal Democratic	Taro Kono (Incumbent)	210,515	79.32	
Social Democratic	Katsumi Sasaki	46,312	17.45	
Anti-NHK	Mariko Watanabe	8,565	3.23	New
Registered electors		473,497		
Turnout			57.32	▲5.90
LDP hold				

In the 2024 general election, Kono receivesd less than 130,000 votes, down 80,000 from his previous record in the 2021 election. It was the first election since the re-allocation of the single-seat constituencies in Japan.

2024
Party	Candidate	Votes	%	±%
Liberal Democratic	Taro Kono (Incumbent)	128,881	55.6	
Social Democratic	Katsumi Sasaki	39,980	17.2	
Independent	Satoshi Utsumi	39,183	16.9	New
Sanseitō	Shuichi Fujita	23,793	10.3	New
Registered electors		452,765		
Turnout			53.30	▼4.02
LDP hold				

Kono increased his vote share in the 2026 general election, winning 62.5% of the vote.

2026
Party	Candidate	Votes	%	±%
Liberal Democratic	Taro Kono (Incumbent)	141,580	62.5	▲6.9
Sanseitō	Yoshimitsu Koyama	39,547	17.5	▲7.2
Social Democratic	Katsumi Sasaki	24,679	10.9	▼6.3
Reiwa	Ryo Miyoshi	20,598	9.1	New
Registered electors		452,421		
Turnout		226,404	52.48	▼0.82
LDP hold				

Political offices
Preceded by Eriko Yamatani	Chairman of the National Public Safety Commission; 2015–2016	Succeeded by Jun Matsumoto
Preceded by Shunichi Yamaguchi	Minister of State for Consumer Affairs and Food Safety; 2015–2016	Succeeded by Jun Matsumoto
Preceded by Haruko Arimura	Minister of State for Regulatory Reform; 2015–2016	Succeeded by Kozo Yamamoto
Preceded by Fumio Kishida	Minister of Foreign Affairs; 2017–2019	Succeeded by Toshimitsu Motegi
Preceded by Takeshi Iwaya	Minister of Defense; 2019–2020	Succeeded by Nobuo Kishi
Preceded by Seiichi Eto	Minister of State for Okinawa and Northern Territories Affairs; 2020–2021	Succeeded by Kosaburo Nishime
Preceded by Seigo Kitamura	Minister of State for Regulatory Reform; 2020–2021	Succeeded by Karen Makishima
Preceded by Kenji Wakamiya	Minister of State for Consumer Affairs and Food Safety; 2022–2023	Succeeded by Hanako Jimi
Preceded by Karen Makishima	Minister for Digital Transformation; 2022–2024	Succeeded by Masaaki Taira
Preceded by Naoki Okada	Minister of State for Regulatory Reform; 2023–2024	Succeeded by Masaaki Taira
Party political offices
Liberal Democratic Party
Preceded by Haruko Arimura	Chief of the Public Relations Headquarters; 2021–2022	Succeeded by Masatoshi Ishida
Preceded by Tsuyoshi Yamaguchi	Director of the International Bureau; 2026–present	Incumbent
