= Kanagawa 15th district =

Legislative district of Japan

Kanagawa 15th District
- Parliamentary constituency for the Japanese House of Representatives
- Numbered map of Kanagawa Prefecture single-member districts
- Prefecture: Kanagawa
- Proportional District: Southern Kanto
- Electorate: 472,647

Current constituency
- Created: 1994
- Seats: One
- Party: LDP

Kanagawa 15th district is a single-member constituency of the House of Representatives, the lower house of the National Diet of Japan. It is located in Kanagawa Prefecture, and includes the cities of Chigasaki and Hiratsuka, and the town of Ōiso.

As of 2022, the district was home to 472,647 constituents.

The district is represented by Taro Kono of the Liberal Democratic Party; he has represented the district since the 1996 election.

== List of representatives ==
| Election | Representative | Party | Notes |
|---|---|---|---|
| 1996 | Taro Kono | Liberal Democratic | |
| 2000 | Taro Kono | Liberal Democratic | |
| 2003 | Taro Kono | Liberal Democratic | |
| 2005 | Taro Kono | Liberal Democratic | |
| 2009 | Taro Kono | Liberal Democratic | |
| 2012 | Taro Kono | Liberal Democratic | |
| 2014 | Taro Kono | Liberal Democratic | |
| 2017 | Taro Kono | Liberal Democratic | |
| 2021 | Taro Kono | Liberal Democratic | |
| 2024 | Taro Kono | Liberal Democratic | |
| 2026 | Taro Kono | Liberal Democratic | |

== Election results ==
2026
| Party | Candidate | Votes | % | ±% |
|---|---|---|---|---|
| Liberal Democratic | Taro Kono (Incumbent) | 141,580 | 62.5 | ▲6.9 |
| Sanseitō | Yoshimitsu Koyama | 39,547 | 17.5 | ▲7.2 |
| Social Democratic | Katsumi Sasaki | 24,679 | 10.9 | ▼6.3 |
| Reiwa | Ryo Miyoshi | 20,598 | 9.1 | New |
| Registered electors | | 452,421 | | |
| Turnout | | 226,404 | 52.48 | ▼0.82 |
| LDP hold | | | | |

2024
| Party | Candidate | Votes | % | ±% |
|---|---|---|---|---|
| Liberal Democratic | Taro Kono (Incumbent) | 128,881 | 55.6 | |
| Social Democratic | Katsumi Sasaki | 39,980 | 17.2 | |
| Independent | Satoshi Utsumi | 39,183 | 16.9 | New |
| Sanseitō | Shuichi Fujita | 23,793 | 10.3 | New |
| Registered electors | | 452,765 | | |
| Turnout | | | 53.30 | ▼4.02 |
| LDP hold | | | | |

2021
| Party | Candidate | Votes | % | ±% |
|---|---|---|---|---|
| Liberal Democratic | Taro Kono (Incumbent) | 210,515 | 79.32 | |
| Social Democratic | Katsumi Sasaki | 46,312 | 17.45 | |
| Anti-NHK | Mariko Watanabe | 8,565 | 3.23 | New |
| Registered electors | | 473,497 | | |
| Turnout | | | 57.32 | ▲5.90 |
| LDP hold | | | | |

2017
| Party | Candidate | Votes | % | ±% |
|---|---|---|---|---|
| Liberal Democratic | Taro Kono (Incumbent) | 159,647 | 67.63 | |
| Social Democratic | Katsumi Sasaki | 38,242 | 16.20 | |
| Kibō no Tō | Ryosuke Nogi | 38,162 | 16.17 | New |
| Registered electors | | 469,287 | | |
| Turnout | | | 51.42 | ▼1.33 |
| LDP hold | | | | |

2014
| Party | Candidate | Votes | % | ±% |
|---|---|---|---|---|
| Liberal Democratic | Taro Kono (Incumbent) | 155,388 | 66.79 | |
| Independent | Toichiro Ikeda | 39,211 | 16.85 | |
| Communist | Tokumitsu Numagami | 38,068 | 16.36 | |
| Registered electors | | 456,896 | | |
| Turnout | | | 52.75 | |
| LDP hold | | | | |

2012
| Party | Candidate | Votes | % | ±% |
|---|---|---|---|---|
| Liberal Democratic | Taro Kono (Incumbent) | 192,604 | 79.98 | |
| Communist | Yuka Asaka | 48,198 | 20.02 | |
| Turnout | | | | |
| LDP hold | | | | |

2009
| Party | Candidate | Votes | % | ±% |
|---|---|---|---|---|
| Liberal Democratic | Taro Kono (Incumbent) | 163,470 | 53.25 | |
| Democratic | Koichiro Katsumata (elected by Minami Kanto PR block) | 124,414 | 40.52 | |
| Communist | Takuya Nishiwaki | 15,786 | 5.14 | |
| Happiness Realization | Yusaku Hamada | 3,341 | 1.09 | New |
| Turnout | | | | |
| LDP hold | | | | |

2005
| Party | Candidate | Votes | % | ±% |
|---|---|---|---|---|
| Liberal Democratic | Taro Kono (Incumbent) | 186,770 | 63.88 | |
| Democratic | Koichiro Katsumata | 83,490 | 28.55 | |
| Communist | Takuya Nishiwaki | 22,139 | 7.57 | |
| Turnout | | | | |
| LDP hold | | | | |

2003
| Party | Candidate | Votes | % | ±% |
|---|---|---|---|---|
| Liberal Democratic | Taro Kono (Incumbent) | 148,955 | 59.89 | |
| Democratic | Fumihiko Sakai | 76,967 | 30.95 | |
| Communist | Sadao Yoshii | 16,122 | 6.48 | |
| Independent | Hidemitsu Katsura | 6,674 | 2.68 | New |
| Turnout | | | | |
| LDP hold | | | | |

2000
| Party | Candidate | Votes | % | ±% |
|---|---|---|---|---|
| Liberal Democratic | Taro Kono (Incumbent) | 120,001 | 47.44 | |
| Democratic | Takeshi Suzuki | 56,943 | 22.51 | New |
| Social Democratic | Etsuko Yamanaka | 39,636 | 15.67 | New |
| Communist | Tadashi Mikami | 24,355 | 9.63 | |
| Liberal League | Yoko Shimizu | 12,012 | 4.75 | New |
| Turnout | | | | |
| LDP hold | | | | |

1996
| Party | Candidate | Votes | % | ±% |
|---|---|---|---|---|
| Liberal Democratic | Taro Kono | 84,723 | 36.44 | New |
| New Frontier | Koichiro Katsumata | 71,426 | 30.72 | New |
| Democratic | Mitsuo Tomizuka | 47,506 | 20.43 | New |
| Communist | Kazuo Yamamoto | 28,820 | 12.40 | New |
| Turnout | | | | |
