= First no Kai =

Japanese political party

First no Kai ファーストの会
- Leader: Chiharu Araki
- Founded: September 27, 2021
- Headquarters: Nakano, Tokyo
- Related party: Tomin First no Kai

Website
- 1st-jp.jp

First no Kai (Japanese: ファーストの会) is a Japanese political party. The party was founded in October 2021 as a sister party of Tomin First no Kai, a political party that is based in and only competes in the city of Tokyo. Tomin First no Kai is the second largest political party in the Tokyo Metropolitan Assembly (behind only the ruling Liberal Democratic Party), but the party previously lacked any representation at the national level. Tomin First had previously created a national party called Kibō no Tō before the 2017 general election, but that party merged with the Democratic Party in 2018 to form the Democratic Party for the People.

First no Kai was founded in preparation for the 2021 general election and plans to nominate candidates to run for seats in the House of Representatives (both single-seat and proportional representation) mainly in the city of Tokyo.

The party's leader, Chiharu Araki, said in 2021 that First no Kai is "conservative centrist".
