= 2025 Tokyo prefectural election =

Election in Tokyo, Japan

- 22 June 2025

All 127 members in the Tokyo Metropolitan Assembly 64 seats needed for a majority
- Turnout: 47.59% (▲5.20 pp)
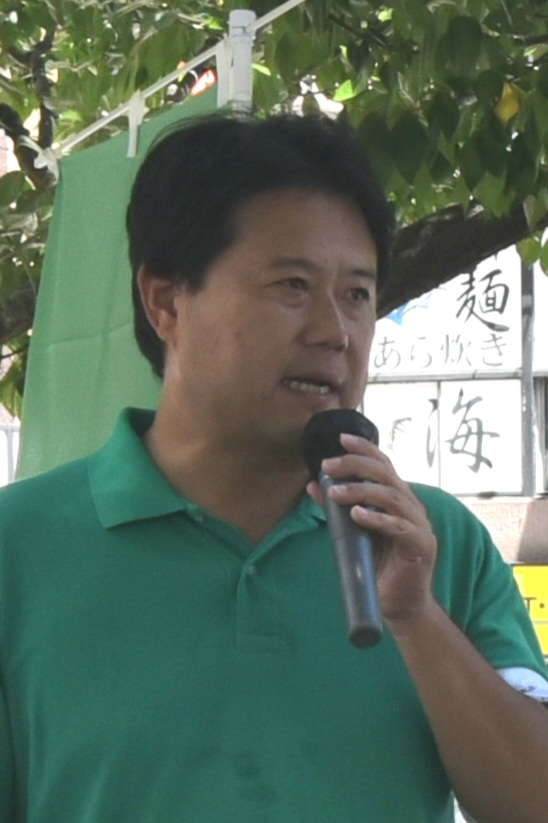

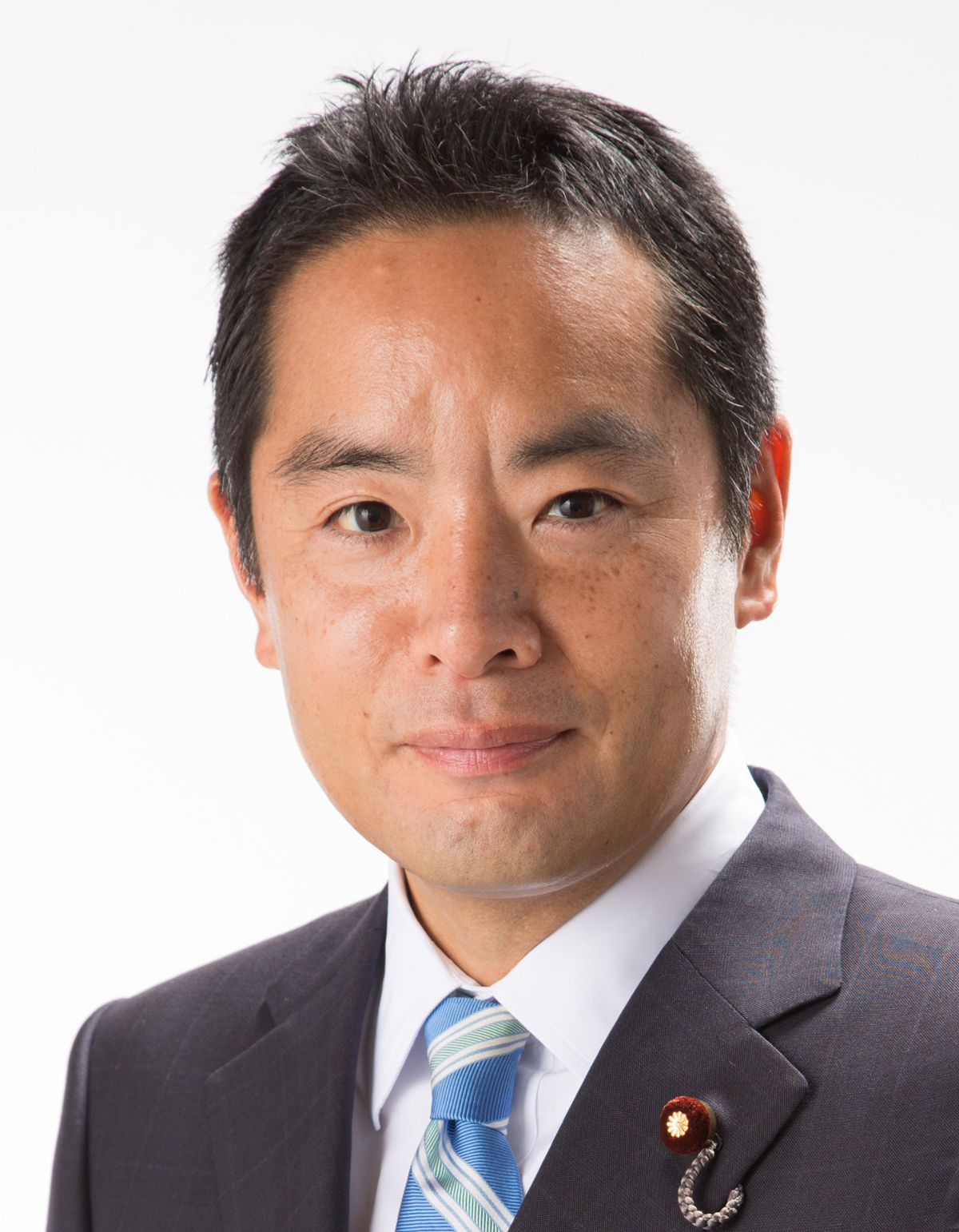

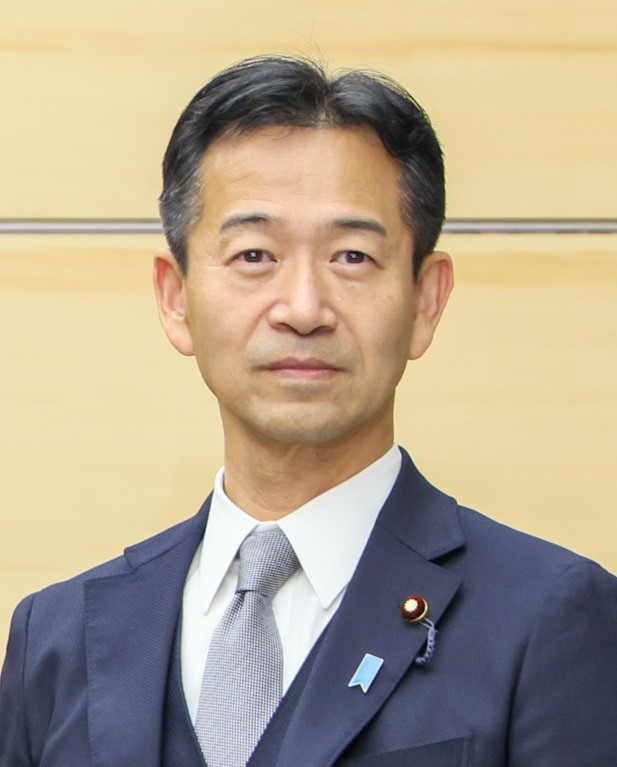

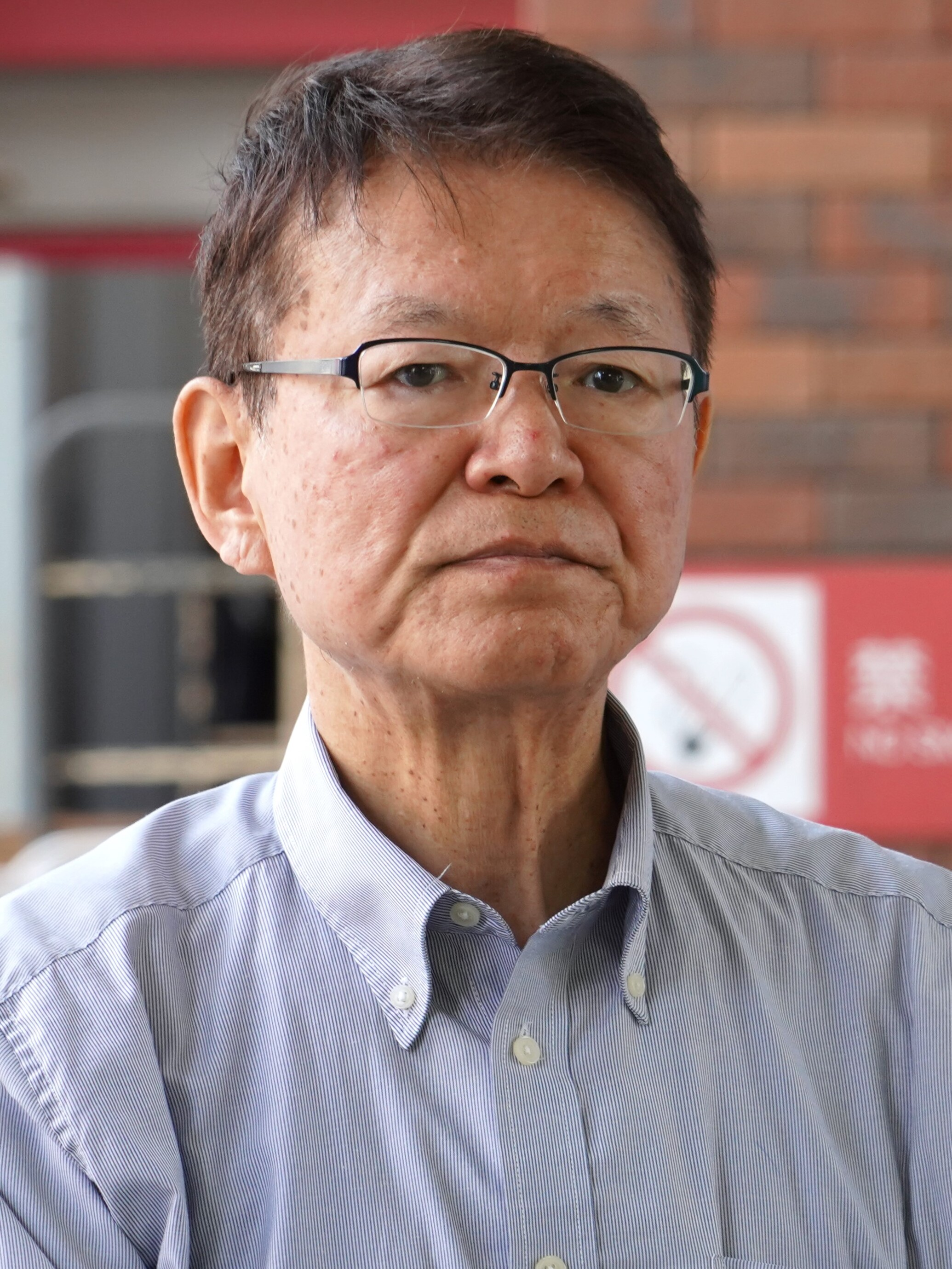

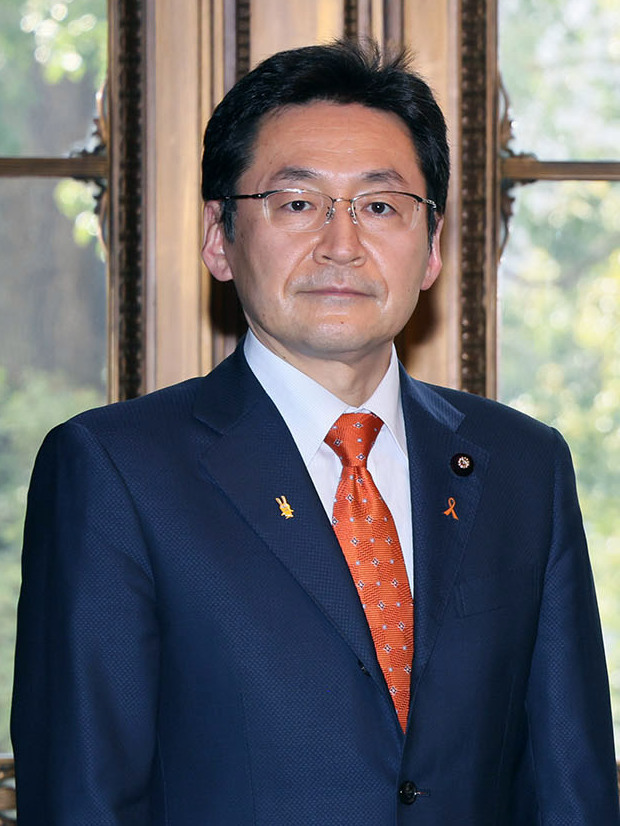

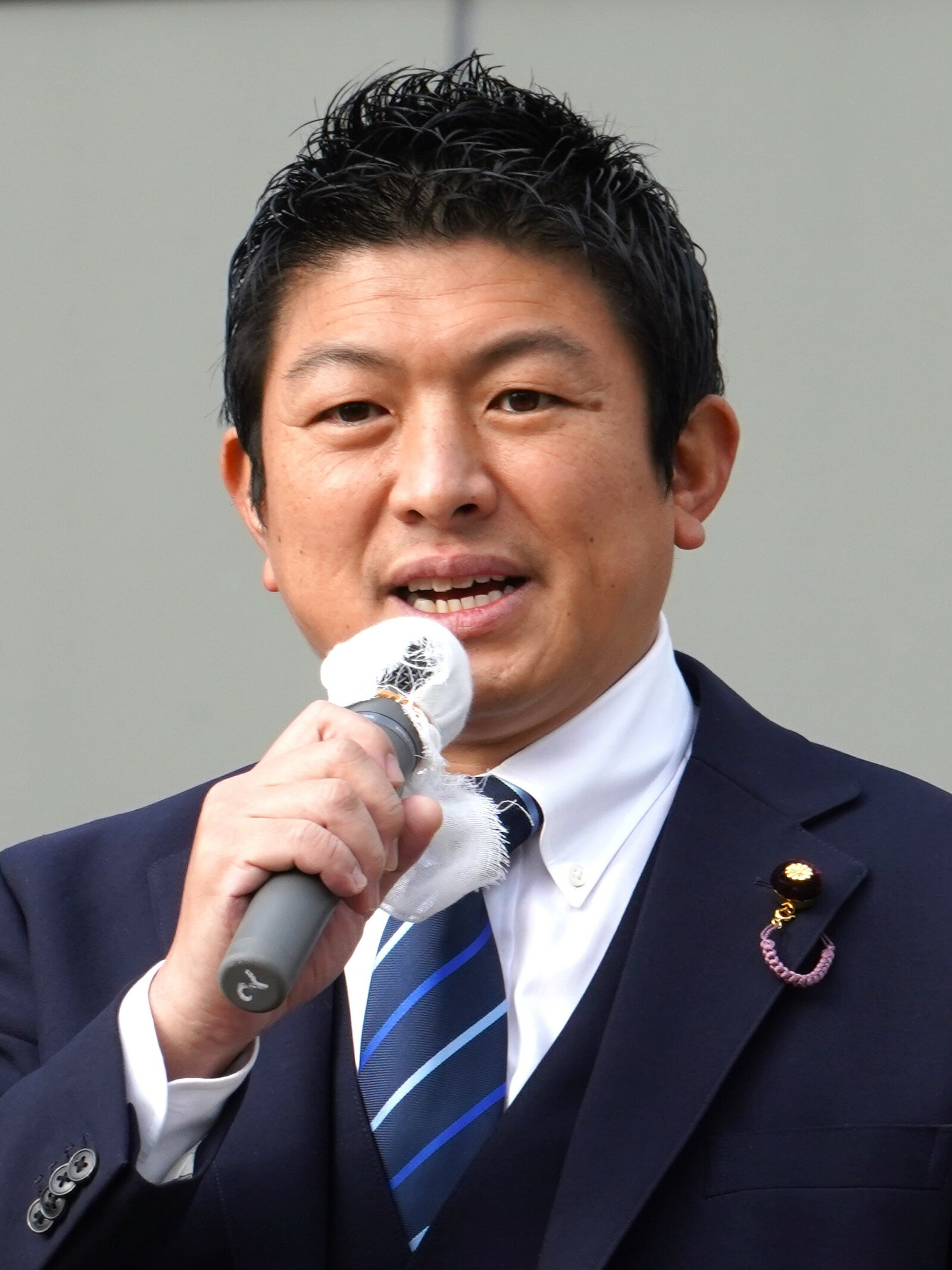

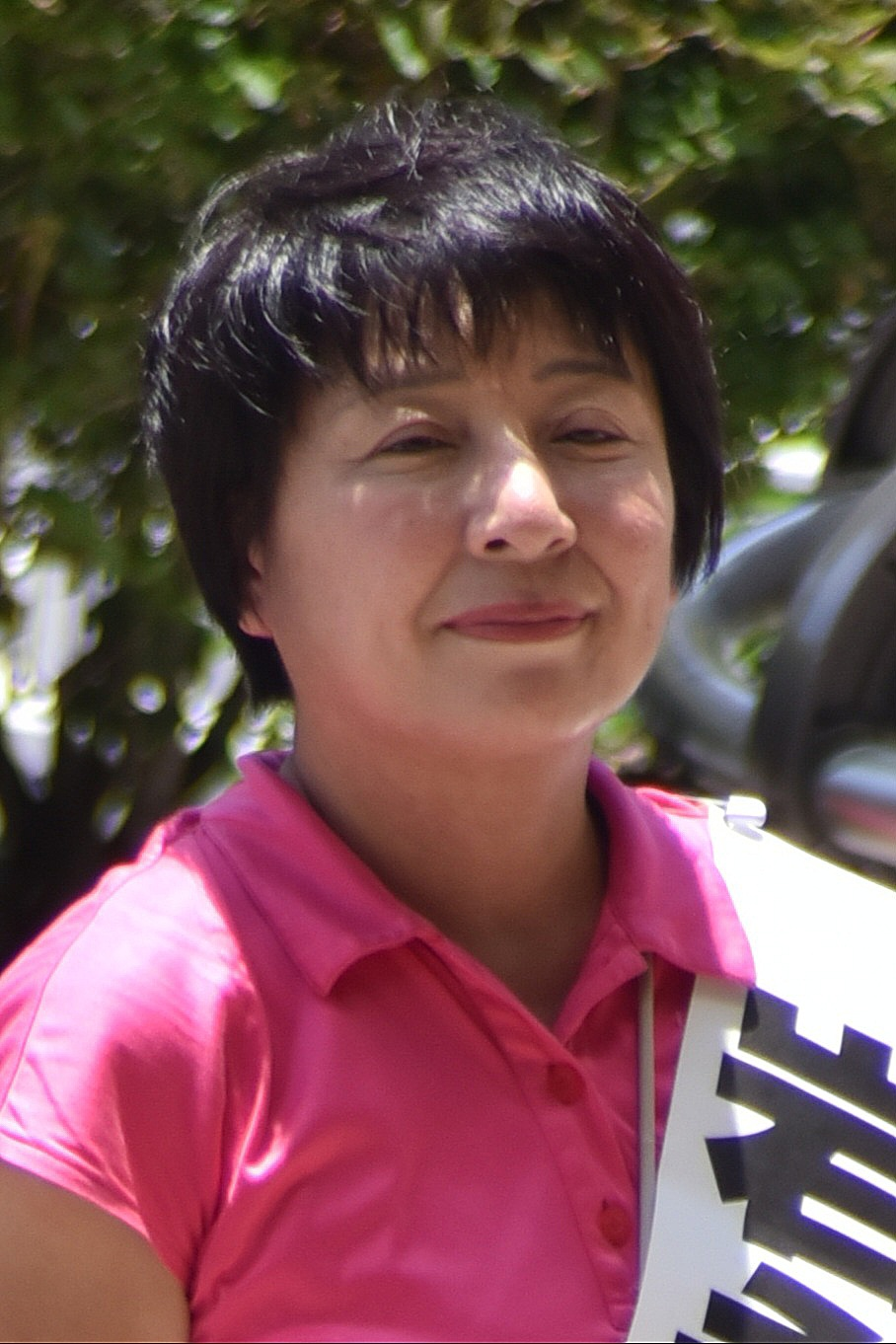
	First party	Second party	Third party
Leader	Takayuki Morimura	Shinji Inoue	Mitsunari Okamoto
Party	Tomin First	LDP	Komeito
Last election	31 seats, 22.28%	33 seats, 25.69%	23 seats, 13.58%
Seats before	26	30	23
Seats won	31	21	19
Seat change	Steady	▼12	▼4
Popular vote	1,043,563	887,317	530,217
Percentage	19.74%	16.79%	10.03%
Swing	▼2.54 pp	▼8.90 pp	▼3.55 pp
	Fourth party	Fifth party	Sixth party
		共産
Leader	Akira Nagatsuma	Yoshihiko Tanabe	Tetsuji Isozaki
Party	CDP	JCP	DPP
Last election	15 seats, 12.34%	19 seats, 13.57%	0 seats, 0.67%
Seats before	12	19	0
Seats won	17	14	9
Seat change	▲2	▼5	▲9
Popular vote	476,579	489,084	367,334
Percentage	9.02%	9.25%	6.95%
Swing	▼3.32 pp	▼4.32 pp	▲6.28 pp
	Seventh party	Eighth party	Ninth party
			無
Leader	Sohei Kamiya	Yasuyo Iwanaga	none
Party	Sanseitō	Tokyo Seikatsusha Network	Independent
Last election	Did not contest	1 seats, 1.25%	4 seats, 5.07%
Seats before	0	1	11
Seats won	3	1	12
Seat change	▲3	Steady	▲8
Popular vote	117,389	64,667	704,929
Percentage	2.22%	1.22%	13.34
Swing	New	▼0.03 pp	▲8.27 pp
Assembly President before election
Hiroki Masuko
Tomin First
Elected Assembly President
Hiroki Masuko
Tomin First

2025 Tokyo prefectural election (Japanese: 令和7年/2025年東京都議会議員選挙, Hepburn: Reiwa 7-nen/2025-nen Tōkyōto gikai giin senkyo) was held on 22 June 2025 to elect all 127 members to the forty-two electoral districts of the Tokyo Metropolitan Assembly.

== Background ==
=== Movements by political party 2021–2025 ===
==== Liberal Democratic Party and Komeito ====
- In the previous 2021 election, LDP became the largest party in the Metropolitan Assembly. Nevertheless, doubts have been cast on the funding parties held following the 2024 general election in which some of the lawmakers failed to declare part of its income. An investigation found that the total amount of money not accounted for in the party's Income Declaration over the past five years was 30 million yen. After this information was disclosed, the LDP group in the assembly decided to dissolve its political organisation, excepting the assembly group.
- The Tokyo branch of Komeito decided not to refer any LDP candidates in the assembly, regardless of whether or not undeclared income existed, after learning about the issues surrounding the LDP funding parties.

Tomin First

- Tomin First, for which Governor Yuriko Koike serves as senior advisor, lost its position as the main party in the assembly to the LDP. Regarding this election, it has collaborated with the DPFP since November 2024 in areas such as district redistribution of power.

==== Opposition Parties ====
- The branches of the JCP and CDP at the Tokyo Assembly re-edited their collaboration for the 2024 gubernatorial election, in which both parties backed Renho as their candidate. They also declared their plans to collaborate in one to three districts. The aim is to prevent the ruling parties from achieving a majority in the assembly.
- The JCP announced its aim to secure their current 19 seats in the assembly and increase them.

Others

- On 15 January, Shinji Ishimaru, who came second in the 2024 gubernatorial election, announced the foundation of a new party called The Path to Rebirth (再生の道, Saisei no michi), for which he is fielding candidates in every electoral district.

=== Assembly composition before the election ===
Groups	Parties	Seats	Total
Tokyo Liberal Democratic Party Group	Liberal Democratic Party	29	30
Tokyo Liberal Democratic Party Group	Independent	1	30
Tomin First Group	Tomin First	25	26
Tomin First Group	Democratic Party For the People	1	26
Japanese Communist Party Group	Japanese Communist Party	19	19
Komeito Group	Komeito	23	23
Constitutional Democratic Party of Japan Group	Constitutional Democratic Party of Japan	12	12
Mirai Group	Independents	3	4
Mirai Group	Constitutional Democratic Party of Japan	1	4
Group to Protect Freedom	Independents	2	2
Not affiliated	Independents	4	7
Not affiliated	Nippon Ishin	1	7
Not affiliated	Tokyo Seikatsusha Network	1	7
Not affiliated	Greens Japan	1	7
Vacant		3	3

== Electoral districts ==

Most districts are coterminous with a municipality (-ku/-shi/-chō/-son) of the same name. The map shows the number of seats in each district. The following districts comprise multiple municipalities:

- Nishi-Tama ("West Tama"; follows the original boundaries of the district of the same name, except Ōme): Fussa, Hamura, Akiruno, Hinohara, Hinode, Mizuho, Okutama
- Minami-Tama ("South Tama"; follows the boundaries of the former district of the same name): Tama, Inagi
- Kita-Tama dai-1 ("North Tama #1"; follows the boundaries of the former Kitatama district): Higashi-Murayama, Higashi-Yamato, Musashi-Murayama
- Kita-Tama dai-2 ("North Tama #2"): Kokubunji, Kunitachi
- Kita-Tama dai-3 ("North Tama #3"): Chōfu, Komae
- Kita-Tama dai-4 ("North Tama #4"): Kiyose, Higashi-Kurume
- Islands: Aogashima, Hachijō, Mikurajima, Miyake, Ogasawara, Kōzushima, Niijima, Ōshima, Toshima

== Candidates ==
On 13 June, the 295 candidates competing for one of the 127 seats, which have been distributed among 42 electoral districts, were announced. Compared to the previous election, the number of candidates increased by 24, and the number of female candidates increased from 74 to 99, breaking the previous record for the number of female candidacies.

Setagaya electoral district has the most announced candidates of any electoral district, with 18.

Incumbents and candidates
Party	Total	Incumbents	Previous represent- atives	New
Liberal Democratic Party	42	23	2	17
The Path to Rebirth	42	0	0	42
Tomin First	37	23	1	13
Japanese Communist Party	24	16	1	7
Komeito	22	16	0	6
Constitutional Democratic Party of Japan	20	12	1	7
Democratic Party For the People	18	0	1	17
NHK Party	9	0	0	9
Ishin	6	1	0	5
Sanseito	4	0	0	4
Tokyo Seikatsusha Network	3	1	1	1
Reiwa Shinsengumi	3	0	0	3
Conservative Party of Japan	1	0	0	1
Social Democratic Party	1	0	0	1
Genzei Nippon	1	0	0	1
Truth Party	1	0	0	1
Conservative Party of Nippon	1	0	0	1
Health and Longevity Party	1	0	0	1
Kumin First	1	0	0	1
Future of Nerima Party	1	0	0	1
Constitutional Republican Party	1	0	0	1
Impeach Supreme Court Judges Party	1	0	0	1
Independents	55	16	1	38
	295	108	8	179

== Opinion polling ==
Fieldwork date	Polling firm	Sample size	LDP	Tomin	Komei	JCP	CDP	Ishin	Netto	Reiwa	DPFP	DIY	CPJ	SDP	Rebirth	Ind.	Others	None/Und.	No ans.	Lead
22 Jun 2025	Election results	47.59% (Note: Election turnout.)	16.8	19.7	10	9.3	9	1.5	1.2	0.9	7	2.2	0.2	0.1	7.7	13.3	1	−	−	2.9
18–19 Jun 2025	Asahi		28	15	7	6	14	3	−	3	10	4	2	−	2	5	1	−	−	13
14–15 Jun 2025	Senkyo.com/JX	4,533	10.5	7.6	3.2	4	7.8	1.9	−	3.3	7.4	3.7	−	−	2.1	−	3.1	45.6	−	2.9
14–15 Jun 2025	Kyodo News	1,015	16	10	5	11	11	1	1	4	6	3	4	1	3	1	−	17	6	1
13–15 Jun 2025	Yomiuri/NNN	1,463	20	10	4	4	7	2	0	3	7	3	1	1	2	4	1	−	31	10
13–14 Jun 2025	Asahi		28	12	6	5	14	3	−	5	11	4	2	−	2	4	3	−	−	14
8–10 Jun 2025	Senkyo.com/JX	5,077	11.8	4.3	3.1	3.6	7.6	2.2	−	4.3	8.2	3.5	1.5	0.4	0.9	−	−	47.3	1.3	35.5
6–7 Jun 2025	Asahi		31	10	5	6	15	4	−	5	12	4	2	−	2	3	1	−	−	16
16–18 May 2025	Yomiuri/NNN	1,476	18	7	6	4	7	3	1	4	10	3	−	−	2	3	3	−	29	11
4 Jul 2021	2021 prefectural election	42.39%	25.7	22.3	13.6	13.6	12.3	3.6	1.3	0.8	0.7	−	−	−	−	5.1	1.1	−	−	3.4

== Results ==
Party	Votes	%	Seats	+/–
Tomin First no Kai	1,043,563	19.74	31	+5
Liberal Democratic Party	887,317	16.79	21	−9
Komeito	530,217	10.03	19	-3
Constitutional Democratic Party	476,579	9.02	17	+5
Japanese Communist Party	489,084	9.25	14	-5
Democratic Party For the People	367,334	6.95	9	+9
Sanseitō	117,389	2.22	3	+3
Tokyo Seikatsusha Network	64,667	1.22	1	0
The Path to Rebirth	407,024	7.70	0	New
Nippon Ishin no Kai	80,545	1.52	0	-1
Reiwa Shinsengumi	46,743	0.88	0	New
Conservative Party of Japan	11,707	0.22	0	New
Social Democratic Party	6,983	0.13	0	0
Other parties	52,059	0.98	0	0
Independents	704,929	13.34	12	+1
Total	5,286,140	100.00	127	–

=== Per electoral district ===
Winners and candidates by district and party
District	Turnout	Nº of seats	Total candidates		Elected/Total candidates^{Endorsements}											
District	Turnout	Nº of seats	Total candidates		Tomin	LDP	Komei	JCP	CDP	DPFP	DIY	Ishin	Netto	Reiwa	Others	Independents
Chiyoda	48.86%	1	7	▲3	0/1	0/1		0/1							0/2	1/2
Chuo	45.47%	1	5	▲1	1/1	0/1									0/2^{CDP,JCP,Net}	0/1
Minato	38.14%	2	7	▼1		1/1			0/1^{Net}	1/1					0/1	0/3
Shinjuku	45.92%	4	8	▼3	0/1	1/1	0/1	1/1	1/1^{Net}	1/1					0/2	
Bunkyo	51.91%	2	3	Steady	1/1	0/1		1/1								
Nerima	47.24%	2	4	▼3	1/1	0/1			1/1^{Net}						0/1	
Sumida	47.67%	3	5	▼1	1/1	1/1	1/1	0/1							0/1	
Koto	49.13%	4	8	Steady	0/1		1/1	0/1	0/1^{Net}	1/1						2/3
Shinagawa	48.92%	4	10	▲2	0/1	1/1	1/1	0/1	1/1^{Net,SDP}	0/1					0/2	1/2
Meguro	43.65%	3	9	▲2	1/1	1/1			1/1^{Net}						0/2	0/4
Ota	48.33%	7	16	▲1	1/1	1/1	0/2	1/1	1/1^{Net}	1/1	1/1	0/1			0/4	1/3^{CDP}
Setagaya	49.70%	8	18	Steady	2/2	1/1	1/1	1/1	1/1^{Net}	1/2	1/1		0/1	0/1	0/4	0/3
Shibuya	42.41%	2	5	Steady	1/1	0/1			1/1^{Net}						0/1	0/1
Nakano	49.07%	3	7	▲2	1/1	0/1	1/1		1/1^{Net,SDP}						0/1	0/2
Suginami	51.15%	6	17	▲5	1/1	1/1	1/1	1/1	1/1	1/1		0/1	0/1	0/1	0/6	0/2
Toshima	47.24%	3	5	▼1	1/1	0/1	1/1	1/1							0/1	
Kita	51.53%	3	8	▲3	1/1	0/1	1/1	1/1^{社}				0/1			0/1	0/2
Arakawa	48.13%	2	6	Steady	1/1	0/1	1/1	0/1							0/1	0/1
Itabashi	48.29%	5	10	Steady	1/1	1/2	1/1	1/1	1/1^{Net,SDP}	0/1		0.1			0/1	0/1
Nerima	50.65%	7	16	▲2	1/2	1/2	1/1	1/1	1/1	1/1	1/1	0/1		0/1	0/3	0/2
Adachi	46.10%	6	11	Steady	1/1	1/2	2/2	1/1	1/1^{Net}						0/3	0/1
Katsushika	45.34%	4	8	▼5	1/1	1/1	1/1	0/1	0/1^{Net}	1/1					0/1	0/1
Edogawa	45.86%	5	10	▲2	1/1	1/1	1/1	0/1		1/1		0/1			0/2	1/2
Hachioji	49.03%	5	11	▲1	1/1	1/2	1/1	0/1	1/1^{Net}		0/1				0/1	1/3^{DPFP}
Tachikawa	43.52%	2	4	▲1	1/1	0/1			1/1^{Net,SDP}							0/1
Musashino	50.02%	1	4	Steady		0/1				0/1					0/1	1/1^{CDP,Net}
Miura	48.51%	2	4	▲1	1/1	0/1			1/1^{Net,SDP}							0/1
Ōme	40.95%	1	3	▲1	1/1	0/1										0/1
Fuchū	46.37%	2	5	▲2		1/1		0/1							0/1	1/2^{Tomin}
Akishima	44.33%	1	4	▲1	1/1	0/1									0/1	0/1
Machida	48.20%	4	8	▼1	1/1	1/1	1/1	0/1	1/1^{Net,SDP}	0/1					0/2	
Koganei	45.29%	1	4	▲1		0/1				0/1					0/1	1/1^{CDP,JCP,Net,SDP}
Kodaira	45.82%	2	4	▲2	1/1	0/1			1/1^{Net,SDP}						0/1	
Hino	46.66%	2	5	▲2	1/1	0/1		1/1							0/1	0/1
Nishi Tokyo	44.94%	2	4	Steady	0/1	0/1									0/1	1/1^{CDP,Net}
Nishi-Tama	38.46%	2	5	Steady	1/1	1/1									0/3	
Minami-Tama	49.42%	2	5	▲1	1/1	0/1									0/1	1/2^{CDP}
Kita Tama 1	45.65%	3	5	Steady	1/1	0/1	1/1	1/1							0/1	
Kita Tama 2	51.70%	2	5	▲1		1/1				0/1			1/1^{CDP,SDP}		0/1	0/1
Kita Tama 3	50.44%	3	5	Steady	1/1	0/1	1/1	1/1							0/1	
Kita Tama 4	46.17%	2	4	▲1		1/1		1/1		0/1					0/1	
Islands	58.17%	1	3	▲1		1/1				0/1					0/1	
District	Turnout	Nº of seats	Total candidates		Tomin	LDP	Komei	JCP	CDP	DPFP	DIY	Ishin	Netto	Reiwa	Others	Independents
Total	47.59%	127	271	▲24	31/37	21/45	19/22	14/24	17/20	9/18	3/4	0/6	1/3	0/3		12/55
Source：

=== Aftermath ===
Following the election, 5 independents joined the CDP caucus, making it the second-largest party in the Assembly, only behind Tomin First and ahead of the LDP.
