= 2021 Tokyo prefectural election =

- 4 July 2021

All 127 seats in the Tokyo Metropolitan Assembly 64 seats needed for a majority
- Turnout: 42.39% (▼8.89%)
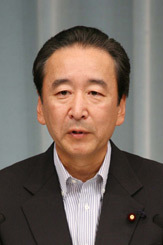

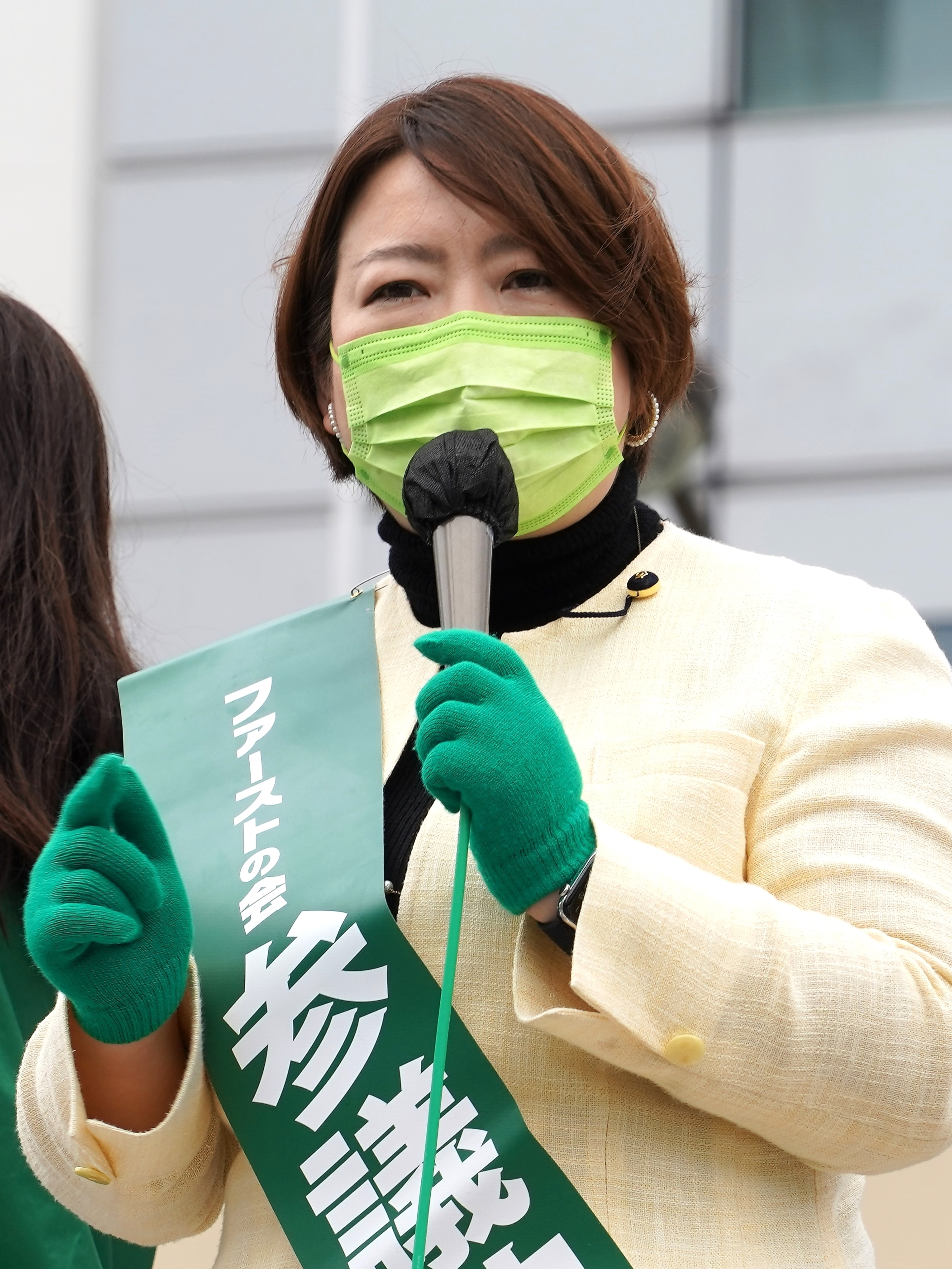

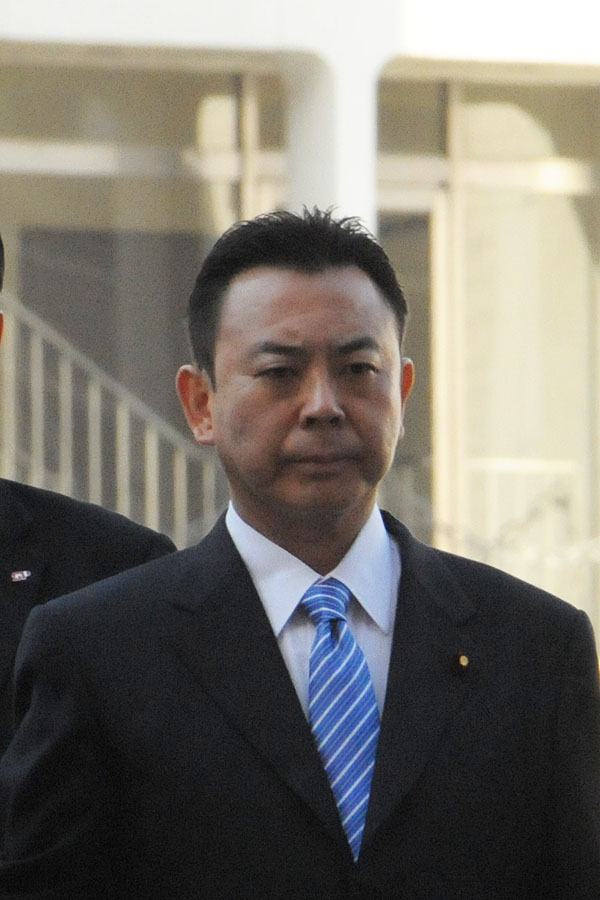

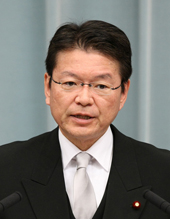

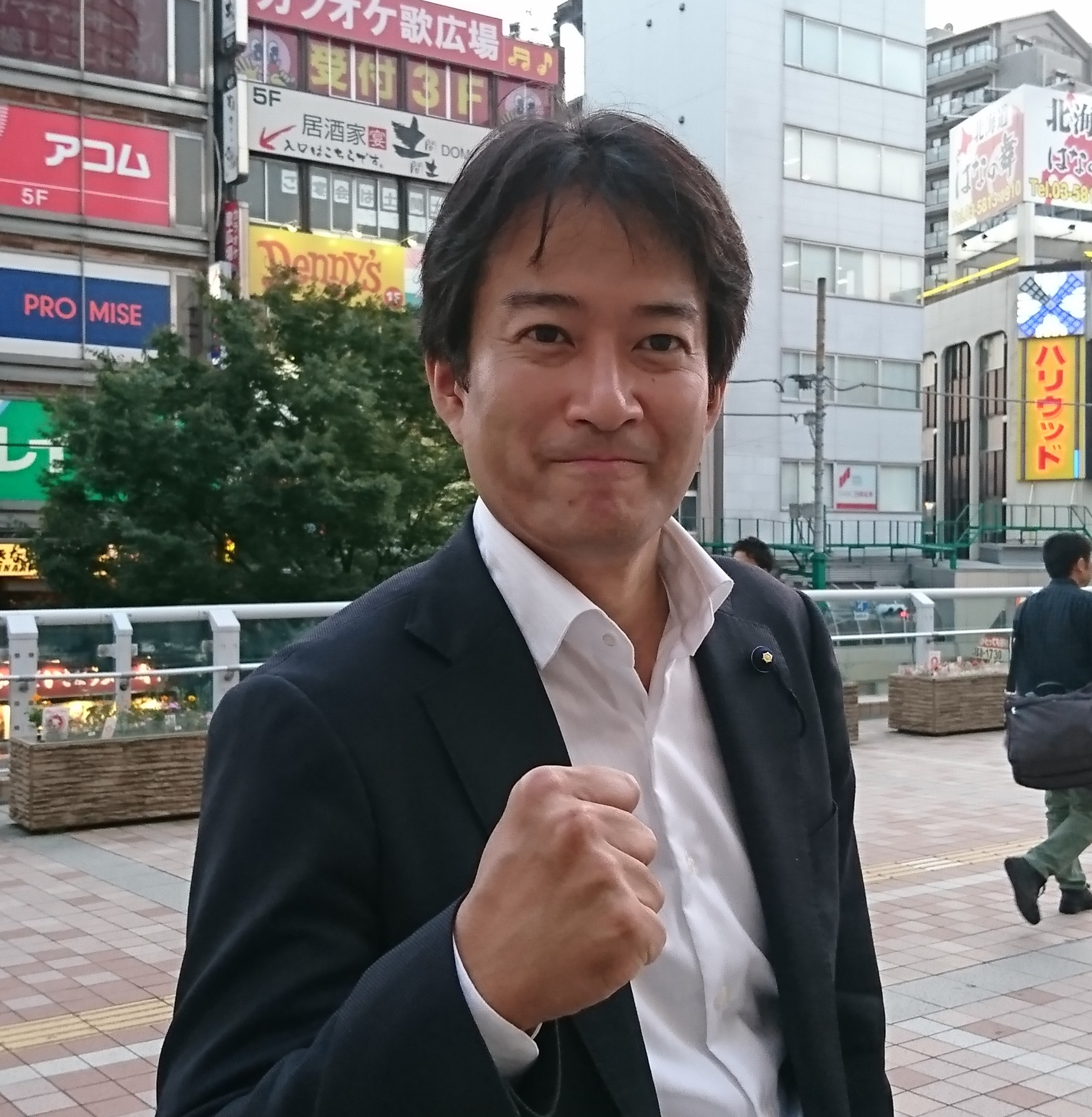
	First party	Second party	Third party
Leader	Ichirō Kamoshita	Chiharu Araki	Yōsuke Takagi
Party	LDP	Tomin First	Komeito
Last election	23 seats, 22.53%	49 seats, 33.68%	23 seats, 13.13%
Seats before	25	46	23
Seats won	33	31	23
Seat change	▲8	▼15	Steady
Popular vote	1,192,796	1,034,778	630,810
Percentage	25.69%	22.28%	13.58%
Swing	▲3.16%	▼11.40%	▲0.58%
	Fourth party	Fifth party	Sixth party
	共産
Leader	Yoshihiko Tanabe	Akira Nagatsuma	Hirofumi Yanagase
Party	JCP	CDP	Ishin
Last election	19 seats, 13.83%	New party (Note: The current CDP is a successor of the former Democratic Party, which won 5 seats and 6.90% of the popular vote in the 2017 election.)	1 seat, 0.97%
Seats before	18	7	1
Seats won	19	15	1
Seat change	▲1	▲8	Steady
Popular vote	630,158	573,086	165,850
Percentage	13.57%	12.34%	3.57%
Swing	▼0.26%	▲5.44%	▲2.60%
	Seventh party
	ネット
Leader	Reiko Yamauchi
Party	Tokyo Seikatsusha Network
Last election	1 seat, 1.25%
Seats before	1
Seats won	1
Seat change	Steady
Popular vote	61,070
Percentage	1.32%
Swing	▲0.07%
- Map of the results

- Composition of the Tokyo Metropolitan Assembly following the election
Assembly President before election
Ryōichi Ishikawa
Tomin First
Elected Assembly President
Shigeki Miyake
LDP

Prefectural elections for the Tokyo Metropolitan Assembly (令和3年/2021年東京都議会議員選挙, Reiwa 3-nen/2021-nen Tōkyō togikai giin senkyo, "Reiwa 3/2021 election of members of the Tokyo Metropolitan Assembly") were held on 4 July 2021. The 127 members were elected in forty-two electoral districts, seven returning single members elected by first-past-the-post, and thirty-five returning multiple members under single non-transferable vote. Two districts had their magnitude adjusted in this election to match population changes.

The results of the election saw the ruling Liberal Democratic Party (LDP) winning the most seats, displacing the regional party Tomin First no Kai to become the largest party in the Assembly. However the coalition of the LDP and their partner Komeito failed to win an outright majority of seats in what was widely described as a poor result for the LDP and Prime Minister Yoshihide Suga.

== Background ==
Yuriko Koike won the 2016 Tokyo gubernatorial election as an independent candidate, and left the LDP in June 2017 to found a new local political party, Tomin First, which won a majority in the 2017 Tokyo prefectural election along with its coalition partner, Komeito. Koike was then re-elected in the 2020 gubernatorial election.

Komeito had since announced that it would leave its coalition with Tomin First in the Metropolitan Assembly, instead seeking to enter into a governing coalition with the Liberal Democratic Party (both parties make up the ruling coalition in the National Diet). Koike was hospitalized on 22 June 2021 due to severe fatigue, however she was discharged on 30 June and made surprise appearances on 3 July, the final day of campaigning, to campaign in support of Tomin First candidates in various districts across central Tokyo.

The election had been described as a potential bellwether for the upcoming general election.

== Electoral districts ==

Most districts are coterminous with a municipality (-ku/-shi/-chō/-son) of the same name. The following districts comprise multiple municipalities:

- Nishi-Tama ("West Tama“; follows the original boundaries of the district of the same name, except Ōme): Fussa, Hamura, Akiruno, Hinohara, Hinode, Mizuho, Okutama
- Minami-Tama ("South Tama“; follows the boundaries of the former district of the same name): Tama, Inagi
- Kita-Tama dai-1 ("North Tama #1“; follows the boundaries of the former Kitatama district): Higashi-Murayama, Higashi-Yamato, Musashi-Murayama
- Kita-Tama dai-2 ("North Tama #2“): Kokubunji, Kunitachi
- Kita-Tama dai-3 ("North Tama #3“): Chōfu, Komae
- Kita-Tama dai-4 ("North Tama #4“): Kiyose, Higashi-Kurume
- Islands: Aogashima, Hachijō, Mikurajima, Miyake, Ogasawara, Kōzushima, Niijima, Ōshima, Toshima

== Candidates ==
Incumbents and candidates (as of June 9) for the 2021 election
Party	Incumbents	Candidates				
Party	Incumbents	Incumbents	Previous representatives	New	Total	(Women)
Tomin First no Kai (Tomin)	46	42	0	5	47	(18)
Liberal Democratic Party (LDP)	25	22	15	23	60	(9)
Kōmeitō (Kōmei)	23	17	0	6	23	(3)
Japanese Communist Party (JCP)	18	16	1	14	31	(18)
Constitutional Democratic Party (CDP)	7	7	2	19	28	(8)
Tokyo Seikatsusha Network (Net)	1	0	1	2	3	(3)
Nippon Ishin no Kai (Ishin)	1	0	2	11	13	(3)
Democratic Party For the People (DPFP)	0	0	3	1	4	(0)
Reiwa Shinsengumi (Reiwa)	0	0	0	3	3	(3)
Other					59	
Independent					59	
Total	126 (1 vacancy)				271	

== Results ==
The majority Liberal Democratic Party (LDP) won the most seats in the election, displacing the regional party Tomin First no Kai as the largest party in the Assembly, while the LDP's coalition partner Komeito maintained their 23 seats for the sixth election in a row. However the LDP/Komeito coalition failed to win an outright majority of seats, an outcome which was widely described as a poor showing for the LDP and a manifestation of public dissatisfaction with Prime Minister Yoshihide Suga's handling of the COVID-19 pandemic and the delayed 2020 Olympic Games.

Tomin First lost 15 seats, becoming the second largest party in the Assembly, however this was described as a better than expected result for the party as most polls and forecasts prior to the election projected the party losing far more seats. Some analysts attributed Tomin First's unexpectedly strong result to the continuing popularity of Tokyo Governor Yuriko Koike, whose policies and personal image form the backbone of the party's appeal, despite Koike no longer serving as the leader of the party.

The newly organized centre-left opposition Constitutional Democratic Party gained eight seats while the Japanese Communist Party gained one, in what some analysts described as an indication of energized opposition to the LDP. The regional Tokyo Seikatsusha Network and Osaka-based centre-right Nippon Ishin no Kai both maintained one seat each in the Assembly. The centre to centre-right Democratic Party For the People and the left-wing populist party Reiwa Shinsengumi both contested the Assembly for the first time; however, neither party won any seats.

Party	Votes	%	Seats	+/–
Liberal Democratic Party	1,192,796	25.69	33	+8
Tomin First no Kai	1,034,778	22.28	31	−15
Komeito	630,810	13.58	23	0
Japanese Communist Party	630,158	13.57	19	+1
Constitutional Democratic Party	573,086	12.34	15	New
Nippon Ishin no Kai	165,850	3.57	1	0
Tokyo Seikatsusha Network	61,070	1.32	1	0
Reiwa Shinsengumi	37,299	0.80	0	New
Democratic Party For the People	31,101	0.67	0	New
NHK Party	2,028	0.04	0	0
Other parties	49,373	1.06	0	0
Independents	235,303	5.07	4	−1
Total	4,643,652	100.00	127	–
Registered voters/turnout	11,157,715	–		
Source: Senkyo Metro Tokyo

== Opinion polling ==
Fieldwork date	Polling firm	Tomin	LDP	JCP	NKP	CDP	Net	Ishin	DPFP	Reiwa	N-Koku	Others	Ind.	Und./ no ans.	Lead
26-27 Jun	go2senkyo	9.7	23.4	12.3	8.4	10.3	0.6	1.6	0.7	1.2	0.5	1.8		29.6	13.7
26-27 Jun	Asahi Shimbun	15	24	7	5	9	1	2	1	2	0	1	7	41.6	9
25-27 Jun	Yomiuri Shimbun	17	23	8	9	8	1	2		1			8	22	6
25-27 Jun	Kyodo	12.1	31.8	13.1	14.1	7.1									17.7
19-20 Jun	go2senkyo	6.9	18.6	10.0	6.1	10.4	0.6	2.5	0.4	1.4	0.4	1.2		41.6	8.2
12-13 Jun	go2senkyo	5.6	19.4	8.9	6.2	11.3	1.0	2.1	1.0	0.8	0.8	2.9		40.0	8.1
28-30 May	Yomiuri	11	30	6	7	8	3						9	25	19
22–23 May	Tokyo Shimbun-JX	9.6	19.3	12.9	3.4	14.0	1.6	3.4	0.5	2.0	0.5	2.8	—N/a	30.0	5.3
2 July 2017	Election	33.7	22.5	13.8	13.1	—N/a	1.3	1.0	—N/a			1.0	6.7		11.2

== See also ==
- 2020 Tokyo gubernatorial election
