= 2021 Japanese general election =

- 31 October 2021

All 465 seats in the House of Representatives 233 seats needed for a majority
- Opinion polls
- Turnout: 55.98% (▲2.30pp; Const. votes); 55.97% (▲2.29pp; PR votes)
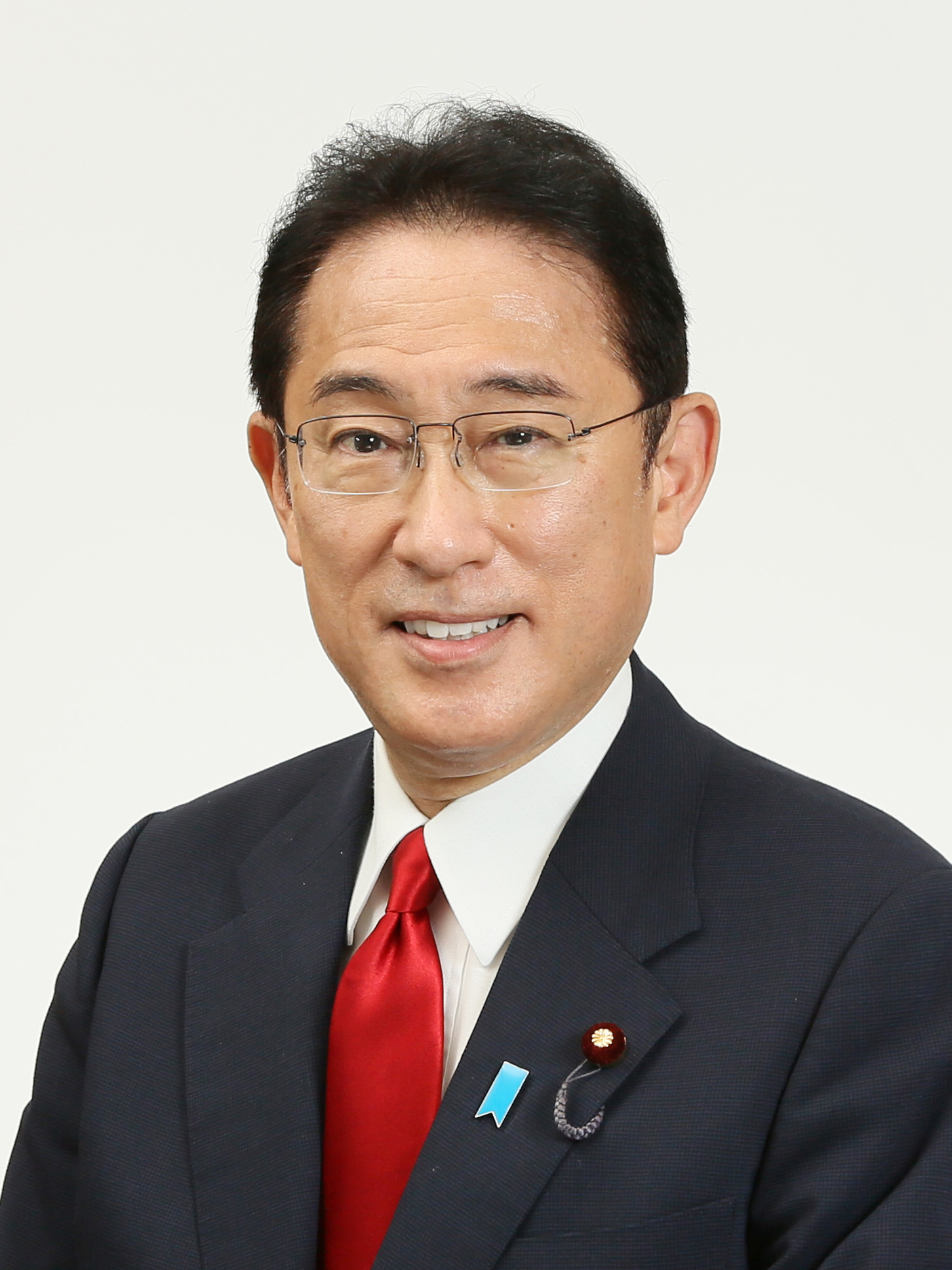

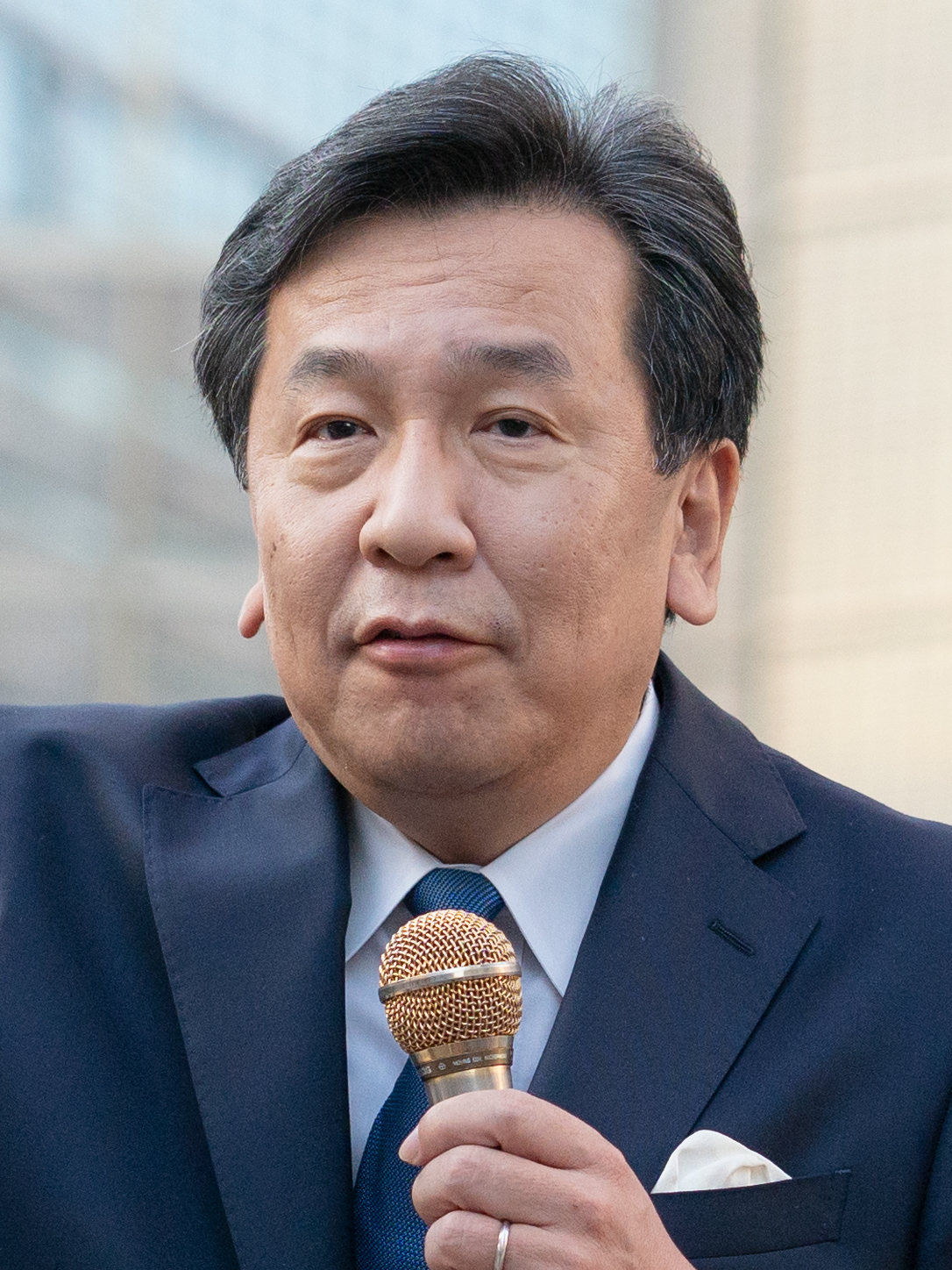

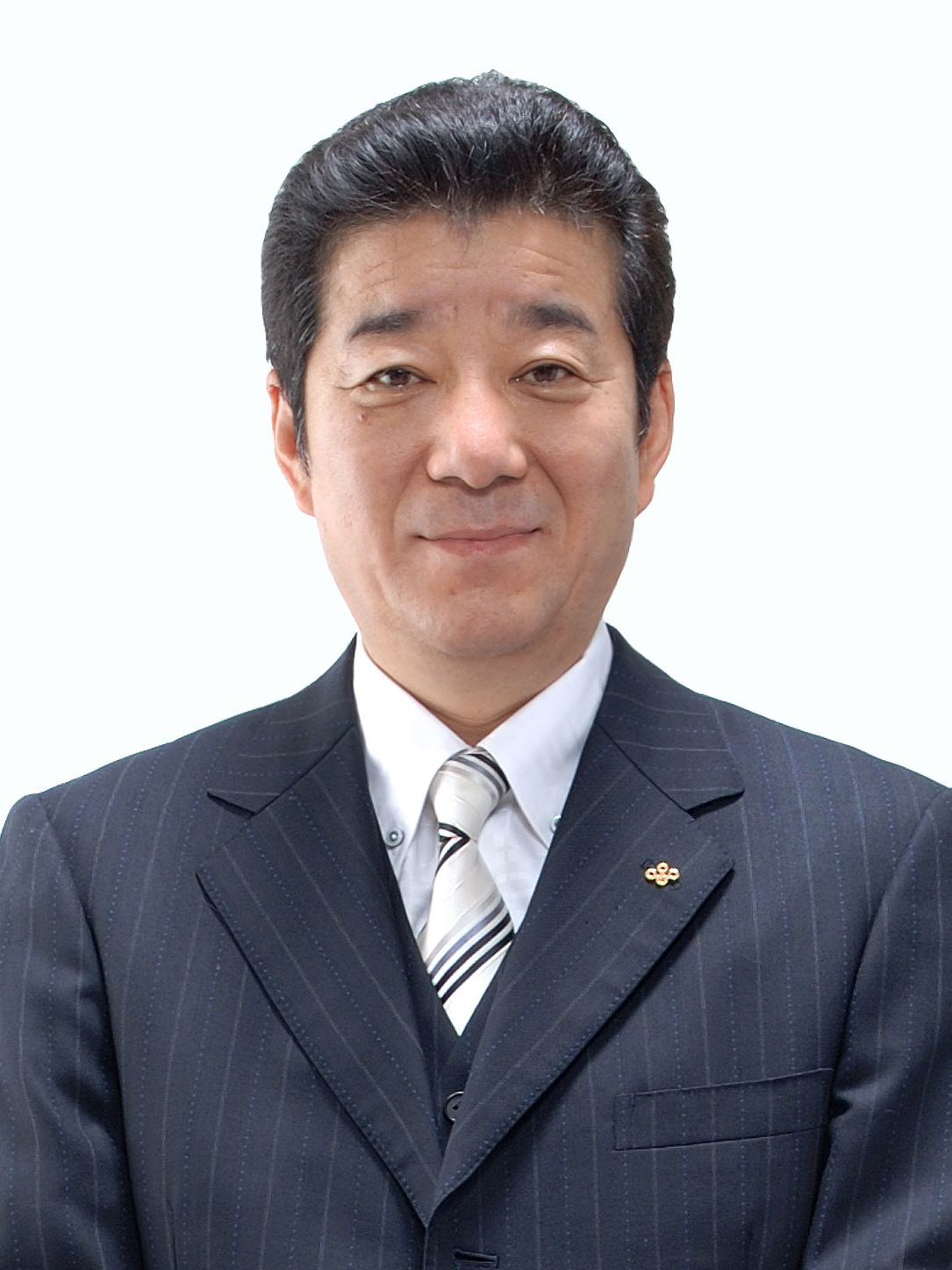

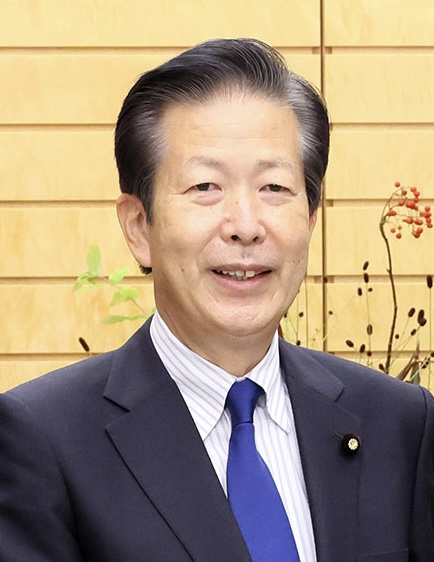

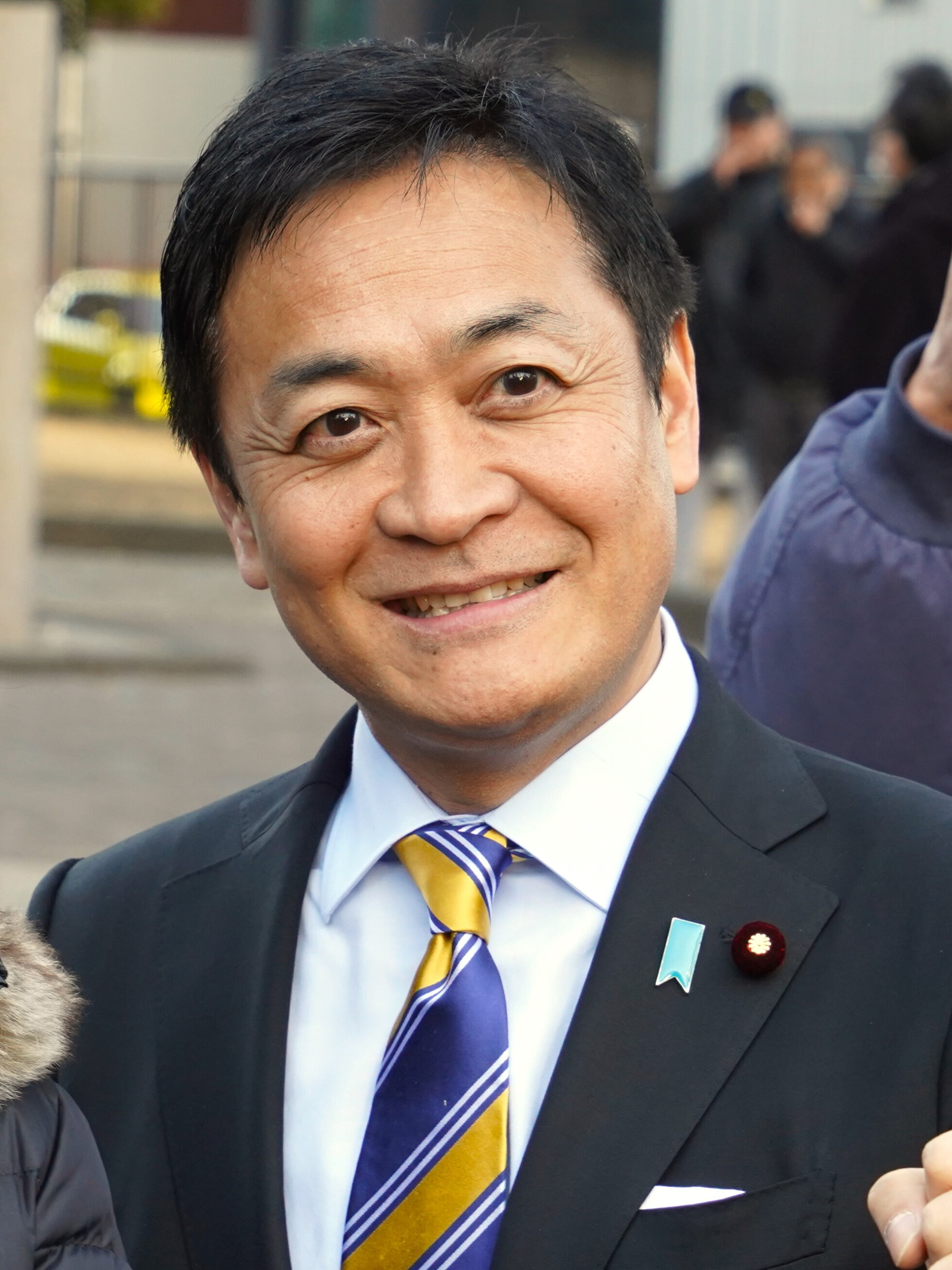

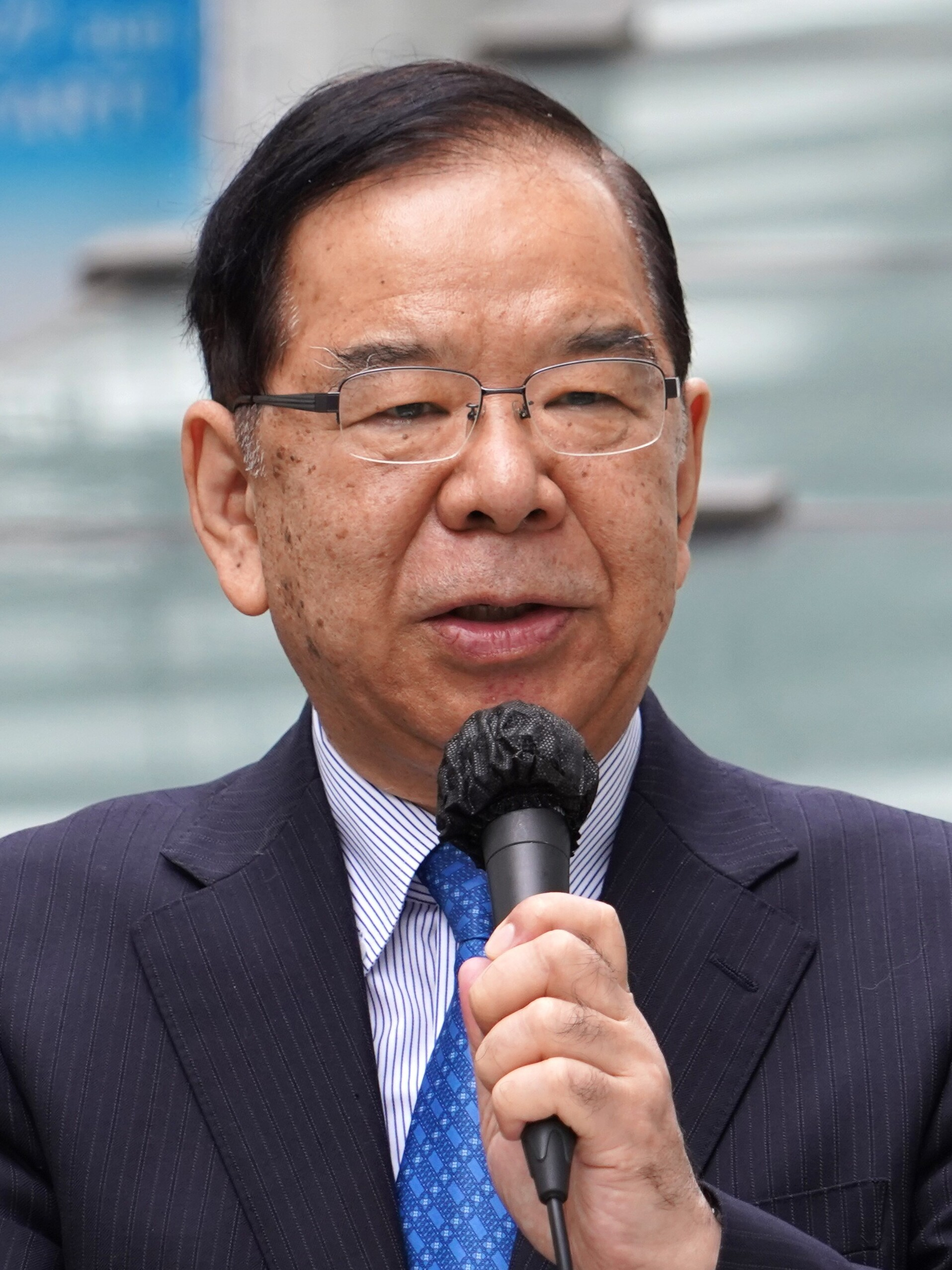
	First party	Second party	Third party
Leader	Fumio Kishida	Yukio Edano	Ichirō Matsui
Party	LDP	CDP	Ishin
Leader since	29 September 2021	2 October 2017	12 December 2015
Leader's seat	Hiroshima 1st	Saitama 5th	Did not stand (Note: Served as Mayor of Osaka)
Last election	284 seats	105 seats (Note: CDP and Kibō no Tō)	11 seats
Seats before	276	109	11
Seats won	259	96	41
Seat change	▼25	▼9	▲30
Constituency vote	27,626,235	17,215,621	4,802,793
% and swing	48.08% (▲0.26pp)	29.96% (▲0.79pp)	8.36% (▲5.18pp)
Regional vote	19,914,883	11,492,115	8,050,830
% and swing	34.66% (▲1.38pp)	20.00% (▼17.24pp)	14.01% (▲7.94pp)
	Fourth party	Fifth party	Sixth party
Leader	Natsuo Yamaguchi	Yuichiro Tamaki	Kazuo Shii
Party	Komeito	DPP	JCP
Leader since	8 September 2009	7 May 2018	24 November 2000
Leader's seat	Did not stand (Note: Sits in the House of Councillors for the Tokyo at-large district)	Kagawa 2nd	Southern Kanto PR
Last election	29 seats	Did not exist	12 seats
Seats before	29	8	12
Seats won	32	11	10
Seat change	▲3	New	▼2
Constituency vote	872,931	1,246,812	2,639,631
% and swing	1.52% (▲0.02pp)	2.17% (New)	4.59% (▼4.43pp)
Regional vote	7,114,282	2,593,396	4,166,076
% and swing	12.38% (▼0.13pp)	4.51% (New)	7.25% (▼0.65pp)
- Districts and PR districts, shaded according to winners' vote strength
Prime Minister before election
Fumio Kishida
LDP
Elected Prime Minister
Fumio Kishida
LDP

General elections were held in Japan on 31 October 2021, as required by the constitution. Voting took place in all constituencies in order to elect members to the House of Representatives, the lower house of the National Diet. As the constitution requires the cabinet to resign in the first Diet session after a general election, the elections will also lead to a new election for Prime Minister in the Diet, and the appointment of a new cabinet, although ministers may be re-appointed. The election was the first general election of the Reiwa era.

The election followed a tumultuous period in Japanese politics which saw the sudden resignation of Prime Minister Shinzo Abe in 2020 due to health issues and the short premiership of his successor Yoshihide Suga, who stepped down as leader of the ruling Liberal Democratic Party (LDP) after only about a year in office due to poor approval ratings. The period since the previous general election in 2017 also saw the consolidation of much of the country's centre-left into a newly strengthened Constitutional Democratic Party (CDP) and the forming of the left-wing populist party Reiwa Shinsengumi led by former actor Taro Yamamoto.

The LDP, led by new Prime Minister Fumio Kishida, maintained a comfortable majority despite losing seats. The primary two left-wing opposition parties, the CDP and the Japanese Communist Party, both underperformed expectations and lost seats relative to their standings in the chamber immediately before the election; this occurred despite both parties cooperating in a significant electoral alliance to avoid vote splitting. The CDP's poor results led to the resignation of party leader Yukio Edano shortly after the election. The Osaka-based conservative party Ishin no Kai gained 30 seats, becoming the third-largest party in the chamber.

== Background ==
Following the 2017 general election, the Liberal Democratic Party (LDP) continued to find itself in a dominant position as Prime Minister Shinzo Abe led the party to a third consecutive victory, the first for a single Prime Minister since 1953. While the LDP's strong showing seemed to suggest momentum for Abe's long-held goal of revising the anti-war Article 9 of the Constitution, the prospect for revision was thwarted due to procedural obstacles in the Diet from opposition parties and the ruling coalition losing its two-thirds majority in the House of Councillors in the 2019 election.

=== Resignation of Shinzo Abe and election of Yoshihide Suga ===
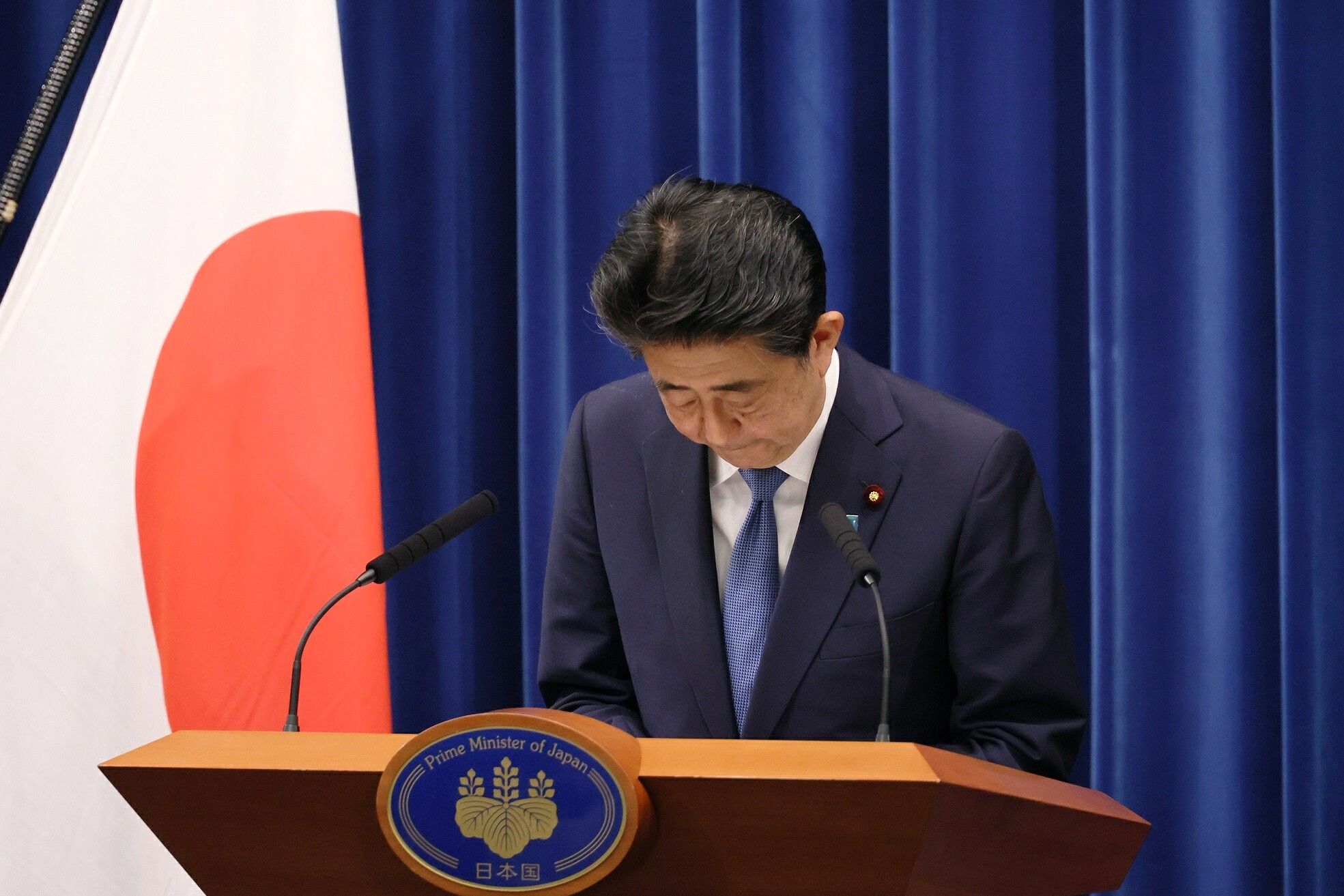
Prime Minister Shinzo Abe announced his resignation in August 2020; he resigned on 16 September, 2020.

Abe's approval ratings suffered in 2018 as several favoritism scandals dominated media coverage. However, he was still re-elected as President of the LDP in September 2018 and became the longest-serving Prime Minister in Japanese history on 19 November 2019 and the longest-serving consecutive Prime Minister on 24 August 2020. However, Abe shocked observers when he announced on 28 August 2020 that he would resign the premiership due to a sudden resurgence of his ulcerative colitis. Chief Cabinet Secretary Yoshihide Suga was elected the next President of the LDP in September 2020 and succeeded Abe as Prime Minister days later.

=== Opposition party consolidation ===
Meanwhile, Japan's many opposition parties remained fractured and disunited. The Constitutional Democratic Party, seeking to establish itself as the primary centre-left opposition party against the LDP, merged with majorities of the Democratic Party For the People and the Social Democratic Party as well as several independent lawmakers in late 2020, officially re-organizing as a new party while retaining the same name and Yukio Edano as leader. Tokyo Governor Yuriko Koike's national party Kibō no Tō was dissolved in May 2018 after it merged with the Democratic Party to form the Democratic Party For the People, while Koike herself was re-elected in a landslide in 2020 as an independent. The period since 2017 also saw the creation of Reiwa Shinsengumi, a left-wing populist party formed by former actor Taro Yamamoto, whose central policy position is abolition of the consumption tax.

=== Suga's popularity falls and cabinet failure ===
While beginning office relatively popular, Prime Minister Suga's approval ratings gradually worsened due to public dissatisfaction over his handling of the COVID-19 pandemic, including Japan's slow vaccine rollout compared to the rest of the developed world, and his management of the delayed 2020 Tokyo Olympic and Paralympic Games. The LDP lost three Diet by-elections in April 2021 and also failed to win an outright majority in the Tokyo Metropolitan Assembly election in July despite winning the most seats. Analysts attributed the losses to Suga's low approval ratings.

=== Tokyo 2020 Summer Olympics and COVID-19 surge ===
When the Olympics were eventually held in July to August 2021, public sentiment rose as Japanese athletes secured a record haul of Olympic medals. However, this did not translate into an upturn in Suga's personal ratings as the event coincided with a state of emergency while COVID-19 cases in Japan continued to surge from the Delta variant. By the time the Tokyo Olympics ended, the country experienced more than a million cases. In an Asahi Shimbun poll taken at the end of the Olympics, the Cabinet's approval ratings fell to an all-time low of 28%, even though 56% of the public agreed that hosting the Olympics was the right decision signifying concern over the government's inability to handle the COVID-19 pandemic. As a result, the government's pandemic response is likely to be one of the election issues.

Although Suga claimed there is no evidence that the Olympics contributed to a surge in daily cases in Tokyo and other parts of Japan, experts, including the government's chief medical adviser believe the Games undermined official messaging on virus rules and encouraged people to become complacent.

=== 2021 LDP presidential election and resignation of Suga ===
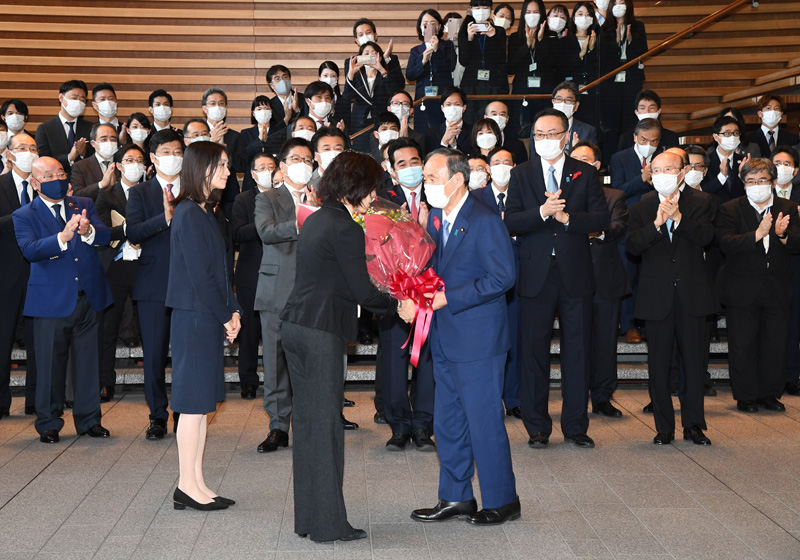
Suga resigned as Prime Minister in October 2021.

Following the Olympics, speculation rose that several LDP lawmakers, such as former ministers Sanae Takaichi, Seiko Noda, 2020 leadership candidate Fumio Kishida and party policy chief Hakubun Shimomura were preparing to run for the LDP leadership against Suga when his term as party president ends in September, in the lead up to the election. The defeat of candidate Hachiro Okonogi, who is Suga's associate, in the Yokohama mayoral election on 22 August added pressure on the prime minister and increased speculation about his political future.

On 3 September Suga announced that he would not run for re-election for the LDP leadership citing low approval ratings, paving the way for a new LDP leader and Prime Minister to take the party into the general election. On 29 September, former foreign minister and centrist candidate Fumio Kishida defeated three other candidates and became the new leader of the LDP. He was elected by the Diet as the 100th Prime Minister of Japan on 4 October.

=== Opposition forms common policy platform ===
On 8 September the Constitutional Democratic Party (CDP), Social Democratic Party (SDP), Japanese Communist Party (JCP) and Reiwa Shinsengumi formed a joint policy platform and an anti-LDP civil coalition for the upcoming election. The platform covered six areas: constitutionalism, measures to tackle the coronavirus pandemic, reducing economic disparities, transitioning to a decarbonized society, gender equality and government transparency. Policies in the platform included:

- Opposition to constitutional revision proposed by the LDP that would expand government powers
- Cuts in consumption tax rate and increasing tax burden on the wealthy
- Shutting down nuclear power plants and opposition for a planned integrated resort and casino development proposals
- New inquiries into a series of political scandals involving the LDP, including scandals of former Prime Ministers Shinzo Abe and Yoshihide Suga

As part of the agreement, members of the four parties involved withdrew from running in several of the single-seat constituencies to avoid vote splitting. The Japanese Communist Party withdrew 22 candidates in total, with only 106 candidates running for the JCP in total. This number was the lowest amount of candidates fielded by the JCP since the first election following Japan's electoral reform in 1996. Taro Yamamoto from Reiwa Shinsengumi withdrew from his race in the single member Tokyo 8th district for the CDP's Harumi Yoshida, choosing instead to run in the Tokyo PR block. Reiwa Shinsengumi withdrew 7 candidates to avoid vote splitting amongst the opposition, accounting for 40% of its planned slate of candidates.

=== Formation then withdrawal of First no Kai ===
On 4 October the regional Tokyo-based political party Tomin First no Kai announced that it had created a new national party called First no Kai. The party said that it planned to enter candidates for single-seat constituencies in Tokyo, and said that while current Governor of Tokyo Yuriko Koike will not be running, she will cooperate with the party. First no Kai will be led by Chiharu Araki, a member of the Tokyo Metropolitan Assembly who is also leader of Tomin First no Kai.

However, on 15 October the party said they would not be fielding any candidates for the election and would concentrate on the next election instead. Analysts believed that Kishida's bringing forward of the election gave little time for recruitment of candidates, thus leading to the decision to sit out this election.

== Election date ==
Under the post-occupation interpretation of Article 7 of the Constitution, the cabinet may instruct the Emperor to dissolve the House of Representatives for a snap election. Elections must be held within 40 days after dissolution. The only time since the Second World War that the House of Representatives was not dissolved before the end of its term was in 1976. If the House of Representatives completes a full four-year term, the election must be held within 30 days before that, unless the Diet is invoked, in session or about to be closed at the time. The previous House of Representatives' term ended on 21 October.

An extraordinary session of the National Diet was necessary in early October to elect the new prime minister. Depending on when that Diet session closed and if and when the new cabinet dissolved the House of Representatives, possible election dates ranged from late October to 14 November without dissolution or up to 28 November with dissolution. Since the election was held in late October, the 2021 election was the first in post-war history to be held not only at, but after the actual end of term (21 October).

On 4 October the newly elected prime minister Fumio Kishida scheduled the election for 31 October, with dissolution of the House of Representatives on 14 October, the final day of the extraordinary Diet session and campaigning set to begin on 19 October.

=== Previous considerations ===
With the resignation of Shinzo Abe in 2020 from his position as prime minister due to health issues, speculation rose of the possibility that a snap election would be held before the end of the full term, but this in fact did not happen. Before the resignation announcement of Yoshihide Suga in 2021, the government did consider a plan to hold a general election on 17 October, several days before the expiration of the four-year term for House of Representatives members, government sources said on 30 August.

== Electoral system ==
The 465 seats of the House of Representatives are contested via parallel voting: 289 members are elected in single-member constituencies using first-past-the-post voting, while 176 members are elected in 11 multi-member constituencies via party list proportional representation. Candidates are allowed to stand in a constituency and be present in the party list, such that if they lose their constituency election, they may still be elected in the proportionally allocated seats.

== Political parties ==
Parties	Leader	Ideology	Seats		Status
Parties	Leader	Ideology	Last election	Before election	Status
Liberal Democratic Party	Fumio Kishida	Conservatism	284 / 465	276 / 465	Governing coalition
Constitutional Democratic Party of Japan	Yukio Edano	Liberalism	55 / 465	109 / 465 (Note: The current CDP was formed in 2020 by a merger of the original CDP and the Democratic Party For the People, the formal successor to Kibō no Tō. Some former members of both Kibō no Tō and the DPFP had objected to the successive mergers and did not join the new CDP; going into the 2021 elections, the new CDP held 109 seats.)	Opposition
Komeito	Natsuo Yamaguchi	Conservatism	29 / 465	29 / 465	Governing coalition
Japanese Communist Party	Kazuo Shii	Communism	12 / 465	12 / 465	Opposition
Democratic Party For the People	Yuichiro Tamaki	Reformism	50 / 465 (Note: Kibō no Tō)	11 / 465 (Note: The Democratic Party merged with Kibō no Tō in May 2018, forming the Democratic Party For the People. The majority of the DPFP later merged with the Constitutional Democratic Party in September 2020. 14 members however refused to merge and instead formed a new party retaining the DPFP name and branding.)	Opposition
Nippon Ishin no Kai	Ichirō Matsui	Conservatism	11 / 465	11 / 465	Opposition
Social Democratic Party	Mizuho Fukushima	Social democracy	2 / 465	1 / 465	Opposition
Reiwa Shinsengumi	Tarō Yamamoto	Progressivism	Did not exist	1 / 465	Opposition

== Party manifestos ==
=== Liberal Democratic Party ===
The LDP manifesto, titled "Create a new era together with you" was released on 12 October and included:

- Wealth redistribution to revive the Japanese economy and empowering the middle class
- Tax breaks for corporations willing to raise wages
- Advance administrative reforms to facilitate digitalization
- Massive investment in science and technology, and funds for university research
- Secure robust supply chains for critical materials, such as rare earths
- Electronic COVID-19 vaccine passports
- Continued development of nuclear fusion power generation, and expansion of renewable energy to achieve carbon neutrality by 2050
- Expanding support for small and medium businesses hit by the COVID-19 pandemic
- Offer subsidies for enterprises if they move into new industries
- Constitutional amendment including the proposed Japanese constitutional referendum to specifically mentioning the Self-Defense Forces in Article 9 of the Constitution and establishing a provision granting the Cabinet stronger powers in an emergency
- Raising Japan's defense budget “above two percent” of gross domestic product (GDP) and enhancing Japan's defense capabilities
- Support Taiwan's bid to join the CPTPP agreement and WHO observer status
- Promoting further nuclear disarmament and nuclear nonproliferation

Observers commented that Prime Minister Kishida's promises during his LDP leadership campaign were missing from the manifesto, and the manifesto was heavily influenced by LDP's conservative figures like Sanae Takaichi, Akira Amari and ex-prime minister Shinzo Abe.

=== Constitutional Democratic Party ===
On 13 October, the CDPJ added into its manifesto:

- Allowing couples to adopt different surnames
- Equality laws for LGBTQ people
- Laws recognising same-sex marriage
- Supplementary budget worth more than ¥30 trillion and cash handouts of ¥120,000 to low-income individuals
- Temporary cuts in consumption tax rate from 10% to 5%
- Changing the corporate tax into a progressive system
- Raising the ceiling for income tax on rich individuals
- Raise capital gains tax to 25% by 2023 in principle and eventually to 30%
- Realizing carbon neutrality without relying on nuclear power, and 100% renewable energy by 2050
- Expanding public support for housing, education, health care, nurseries and elderly care
- Better conditions for medical professionals by a ¥200,000 salary bonus, increasing staff at public health centers and expanding PCR testing
- Revision to the U.S.–Japan Status of Forces Agreement
- Halt construction work related to the relocation of Marine Corps Air Station Futenma in Okinawa
- Enter Japan into Treaty on the Prohibition of Nuclear Weapons as an observer

=== Komeito ===
Komeito policies included:

- Enter Japan into Treaty on the Prohibition of Nuclear Weapons as an observer
- Expanded subsidies to raise the wages of employees working at small businesses
- Resume the Go To Travel domestic tourism stimulus program
- No building of new nuclear power plants and decarbonization through thermal power
- Allowing couples to adopt different surnames

=== Japanese Communist Party ===
On 12 October the JCP announced its manifesto, including the following proposals:

- Cash handouts of ¥100,000 to middle-income households
- Raise the minimum wage, currently averaging at ¥930, to ¥1,500 per hour
- Lower the consumption tax to 5%
- Increase the existing government target of 46% cuts in carbon emissions by fiscal year 2030, to 50% and 60%

=== Nippon Ishin no Kai ===
The Nippon Ishin no Kai manifesto featured pledges including:

- Reform of social insurance and pension system, with the introduction of a universal basic income of ¥60,000 per month, with additional supplements for non-coupled elderly
- Reform of income tax and social insurance fee, replacing the current system with a two-tiered income tax
- Deregulation of the workforce, allowing for compensated dismissals
- Reform of the social medical insurance system from age-based subsidy rates to income-based cost subsidies
- Universal access to free education from preschool to university, written within the constitution
- Introduction of the "2:1 rule", requiring two pieces of regulation to be removed per introduction of any new industrial regulation
- Deregulation of protected industries such as ridesharing, finance and agriculture
- Separate surnames for married couples
- Same-sex marriage legalisation
- Maintaining current emission reduction targets with consideration of carbon pricing schemes
- Legislating Osaka as the vice-capital of Japan
- Push for further devolution with merger of prefectures into states (dōshūsei), while allocating the consumption tax as a regional tax
- Constitutional amendments including: Universal free education, devolution, and the establishment of constitutional courts
- Maintaining agnate succession of the Imperial throne while considering re-royalisation of former Imperial household members.
- Repealing the 1%GDP cap on defence spending and the establishment of a national intelligence organisation
- Promotion of free trade, especially within the Asia-pacific region
- Add hospital capacity for COVID-19 treatment
- Temporary cuts in consumption tax rate from 10% to 5%, with tax rates set to 8% after two years
- 30% reduction in diet members, and a 30% cut in member's compensation
- Contributions reform prohibiting corporate and organisational donations to political parties and candidates
- Establishment of a public documents bureau, digitalisation of all public document, and maintaining edit records through utilisation of blockchain technology

== Opinion polls ==
The charts below depict party identification polling for the next Japanese general election using a 15-poll moving average.

LDP CDP DP Kōmeitō JCP Japan Innovation Party DPFP SDP LP Reiwa Shinsengumi Kibō no Tō N-Koku

CDP DP Kōmeitō JCP Japan Innovation Party DPFP SDP LP Reiwa Shinsengumi Kibō no Tō N-Koku

== Candidates ==

Numbers of candidates by party
Party	Before election	Const.	PR	Total
LDP	276	277	310	338
CDP	109	214	239	240
Komei	29	9	44	53
JCP	12	105	40	130
Ishin	11	94	96	96
DPFP	8	21	27	27
Reiwa	1	12	21	21
SDP	1	9	15	15
N-Koku	1	27	11	30
Others	1	9	14	23
Ind.	0	80	–	78
Total	461	857	817	1,051

== Results ==

Constituency Cartogram

Many polls had predicted a weakened LDP or even a complete loss of government control in the elections, with one poll by The Japan Times suggesting the party would lose around 40 seats. Though the LDP did lose 25 seats compared to the previous elections, they comfortably maintained their single-party majority in the Diet.

The opposition coalition of CDP, JCP, SDP and Reiwa Shinsengumi failed to increase its seat share, suffering a net loss of thirteen seats compared to the outgoing parliament. The CDP itself remained the largest opposition party, finishing second with 96 seats; although this marked an increase on the 55 seats won by the original CDP in the 2017 elections, the party had held 109 seats going into the elections following the merger with the Democratic Party For the People. The JCP lost two seats going from 12 to 10, the SDP kept its one constituency seat in Okinawa, and Reiwa Shinsengumi increased its seats from one prior to the election to three.

The Osaka-based Nippon Ishin no Kai saw a strong third-place finish with 41 seats, a net gain of 30. The party won all seats in Osaka prefecture, except for four where they did not stand a candidate. The party also finished first in the Kinki Proportional Block.

Party	Proportional			Constituency			Total seats	+/–
Party	Votes	%	Seats	Votes	%	Seats	Total seats	+/–
Liberal Democratic Party	19,914,883	34.66	72	27,626,235	48.08	187	259	−25
Constitutional Democratic Party of Japan	11,492,095	20.00	39	17,215,621	29.96	57	96	New
Nippon Ishin no Kai	8,050,830	14.01	25	4,802,793	8.36	16	41	+30
Komeito	7,114,282	12.38	23	872,931	1.52	9	32	+3
Japanese Communist Party	4,166,076	7.25	9	2,639,631	4.59	1	10	−1
Democratic Party For the People	2,593,396	4.51	5	1,246,812	2.17	6	11	New
Reiwa Shinsengumi	2,215,648	3.86	3	248,280	0.43	0	3	New
Social Democratic Party	1,018,588	1.77	0	313,193	0.55	1	1	−1
NHK Party	796,788	1.39	0	150,542	0.26	0	0	New
Shiji Seitō Nashi	46,142	0.08	0				0	0
Japan First Party	33,661	0.06	0	9,449	0.02	0	0	New
Yamato Party	16,970	0.03	0	15,091	0.03	0	0	New
New Party to Strengthen Corona Countermeasures by Change of Government	6,620	0.01	0				0	New
Kunimori Conservative Party				29,306	0.05	0	0	New
Love Earth Party				5,350	0.01	0	0	New
Nippon Spirits Party				4,552	0.01	0	0	0
Reform Future Party				3,698	0.01	0	0	New
Renewal Party				2,750	0.00	0	0	New
Party for a Successful Japan				1,630	0.00	0	0	New
Independents				2,269,168	3.95	12	12	−10
Total	57,465,979	100.00	176	57,457,032	100.00	289	465	0
Valid votes	57,465,979	97.58		57,457,032	97.55			
Invalid/blank votes	1,425,366	2.42		1,443,227	2.45			
Total votes	58,891,345	100.00		58,900,259	100.00			
Registered voters/turnout	105,224,103	55.97		105,224,103	55.98			
Source: Ministry of Internal Affairs and Communications

=== By prefecture ===
Prefecture	Total seats	Seats won							
Prefecture	Total seats	LDP	CDP	Ishin	Komeito	DPP	JCP	SDP	Ind.
Aichi	15	11	3			1			
Akita	3	2	1						
Aomori	3	3							
Chiba	13	9	4						
Ehime	4	4							
Fukui	2	2							
Fukuoka	11	8	2						1
Fukushima	5	2	3						
Gifu	5	5							
Gunma	5	5							
Hiroshima	7	5	1		1				
Hokkaido	12	6	5		1				
Hyōgo	12	8	1	1	2				
Ibaraki	7	5				1			1
Ishikawa	3	3							
Iwate	3	2	1						
Kagawa	3	1	1			1			
Kagoshima	4	2	1						1
Kanagawa	18	11	7						
Kōchi	2	2							
Kumamoto	4	3							1
Kyoto	6	2	2			1			1
Mie	4	3	1						
Miyagi	6	4	2						
Miyazaki	3	2	1						
Nagano	5	4	1						
Nagasaki	4	3				1			
Nara	3	1	1						1
Niigata	6	2	3						1
Ōita	3	2							1
Okayama	5	4							1
Okinawa	4	2					1	1	
Osaka	19			15	4				
Saga	2		2						
Saitama	15	12	3						
Shiga	4	4							
Shimane	2	2							
Shizuoka	8	5	2						1
Tochigi	5	4	1						
Tokushima	2	1							1
Tokyo	25	15	8		1				1
Tottori	2	2							
Toyama	3	3							
Wakayama	3	2				1			
Yamagata	3	3							
Yamaguchi	4	4							
Yamanashi	2	2							
Total	289	187	57	16	9	6	1	1	12

=== By PR block ===
PR block	Total seats	Seats won													
PR block	Total seats	LDP	%	CDP	%	Ishin	%	Komei	%	JCP	%	DPP	%	Reiwa	%
Chūgoku	11	6	43.4%	2	18.4%	1	9.2%	2	14.0%	0	5.5%	0	3.7%	0	3.0%
Hokkaido	8	4	33.6%	3	26.6%	0	8.4%	1	11.5%	0	8.1%	0	2.9%	0	4.0%
Hokuriku–Shinetsu	11	6	41.8%	3	22.0%	1	10.3%	1	9.2%	0	6.4%	0	3.8%	0	3.2%
Kinki (Kansai)	28	8	25.7%	3	11.6%	10	33.9%	3	12.3%	2	7.8%	1	3.2%	1	3.1%
Kyushu	20	8	35.7%	4	20.1%	2	8.6%	4	16.5%	1	5.8%	1	4.4%	0	3.9%
Northern Kanto	19	7	35.2%	5	22.5%	2	10.0%	3	13.3%	1	7.2%	1	4.8%	0	3.9%
Shikoku	6	3	39.2%	1	17.2%	1	10.2%	1	13.7%	0	6.4%	0	7.2%	0	3.1%
Southern Kanto	22	9	34.9%	5	22.3%	3	11.7%	2	11.5%	1	7.2%	1	5.2%	1	4.1%
Tohoku	13	6	39.5%	4	24.1%	1	6.3%	1	11.1%	1	7.1%	0	4.8%	0	3.5%
Tōkai	21	9	37.4%	5	22.1%	2	10.3%	3	11.7%	1	6.1%	1	5.7%	0	4.1%
Tokyo	17	6	31.0%	4	20.1%	2	13.3%	2	11.1%	2	10.4%	0	4.7%	1	5.6%
Total	176	72		39		25		23		9		5		3	

=== Party-list vote by prefecture ===
Prefecture	LDP	CDP	Ishin	Komei	JCP	DPP	Reiwa	SDP
Aichi	35.9	22.4	11.0	11.3	6.4	5.7	4.4	1.3
Akita	45.4	21.1	5.6	10.8	5.9	5.2	2.7	2.3
Aomori	43.2	23.8	4.4	11.0	7.9	2.5	3.3	2.7
Chiba	35.5	22.1	11.2	12.4	7.0	5.3	3.8	1.4
Ehime	41.1	18.6	9.9	14.2	5.2	4.4	3.3	2.1
Fukui	45.9	20.9	9.1	9.5	5.3	3.6	3.4	1.1
Fukuoka	33.0	19.3	11.1	17.3	6.5	4.4	4.3	2.5
Fukushima	37.9	25.7	5.3	11.2	7.2	5.2	3.8	2.3
Gifu	40.3	20.6	10.0	11.6	6.2	5.0	3.8	1.2
Gunma	38.4	20.2	9.3	14.3	7.3	3.5	3.6	1.9
Hiroshima	45.9	17.0	10.4	12.3	4.9	3.5	2.8	1.9
Hokkaido	33.6	26.6	8.4	11.5	8.1	2.9	4.0	1.6
Hyogo	27.4	13.4	32.1	12.3	6.2	3.0	3.3	1.2
Ibaraki	38.1	20.2	9.9	14.1	5.7	5.9	3.7	1.3
Ishikawa	44.1	18.4	14.4	8.7	4.5	3.5	3.1	1.9
Iwate	35.5	29.2	4.6	9.2	8.0	5.2	3.8	3.1
Kagawa	39.9	13.1	8.7	11.7	4.5	16.4	2.5	2.0
Kagoshima	41.3	20.7	7.7	14.3	4.6	3.1	3.2	3.6
Kanagawa	34.2	22.2	12.5	10.8	7.4	5.2	4.3	1.9
Kochi	38.0	21.7	6.1	15.0	10.4	3.0	3.0	1.5
Kumamoto	40.8	19.1	7.2	17.1	4.3	3.9	3.5	2.5
Kyoto	29.2	13.7	23.0	9.8	13.2	5.1	3.7	1.1
Mie	36.3	25.0	9.1	13.8	5.3	3.9	3.9	1.2
Miyagi	37.4	22.9	10.0	11.4	7.3	3.9	3.5	2.3
Miyazaki	38.9	17.2	9.1	16.2	5.3	5.3	2.8	3.5
Nagano	35.0	26.3	9.1	10.3	8.9	3.9	3.4	2.0
Nagasaki	37.1	19.7	7.2	15.7	4.8	8.7	3.0	2.5
Nara	30.6	13.9	28.1	11.8	7.0	3.5	2.7	1.1
Niigata	43.9	24.2	6.5	8.7	6.1	4.0	3.0	2.3
Oita	36.5	22.4	7.6	14.1	5.3	3.8	3.5	5.3
Okayama	37.8	19.8	9.7	15.9	6.3	4.7	3.0	1.4
Okinawa	23.8	20.2	6.0	20.9	9.7	3.1	5.9	8.6
Osaka	20.4	9.0	42.5	13.4	7.6	2.2	2.8	1.0
Saga	41.4	25.8	6.1	12.8	3.8	3.4	3.2	2.1
Saitama	32.5	23.6	10.2	13.3	8.4	4.9	4.1	1.6
Shiga	35.1	15.8	21.2	8.7	7.3	5.1	4.2	1.5
Shimane	42.5	22.0	7.4	12.7	5.8	3.5	2.9	2.1
Shizuoka	39.3	20.9	9.7	11.3	5.6	7.0	3.6	1.3
Tochigi	38.1	24.5	10.3	11.7	4.5	4.2	3.6	1.6
Tokushima	35.8	15.6	17.0	14.4	6.9	3.9	3.8	1.2
Tokyo	31.0	20.1	13.3	11.1	10.4	4.7	5.6	1.4
Tottori	36.5	23.7	7.9	16.5	6.0	3.2	3.5	1.6
Toyama	45.7	12.7	18.4	8.4	5.0	3.5	2.9	2.2
Wakayama	33.8	11.1	21.5	15.8	7.2	5.7	2.6	0.9
Yamagata	41.7	20.9	5.1	12.4	6.0	6.9	3.4	2.3
Yamaguchi	49.6	14.7	7.4	14.4	5.4	2.8	3.5	1.4
Yamanashi	39.7	24.8	6.0	11.7	6.5	4.5	4.1	1.5
All Over Japan	34.7	20.0	14.1	12.4	7.3	4.5	3.9	1.8

== Reactions ==
The results were disappointing for Japan's left-wing opposition parties, who had sought to capitalize on the high disapproval ratings of LDP administrations in 2020–2021. The two largest opposition parties, the CDP and the JCP, both lost seats compared to the outgoing parliament, despite their unified candidate agreement and joint policy platform. CDP leader Yukio Edano announced two days after the election that he would resign as leader following the party's performance, triggering a leadership election.

The right-wing populist Nippon Ishin no Kai gained 30 seats, receiving strong support in its home region of Osaka. Ishin no Kai became the third-largest party in the chamber, which was seen by observers as a sign of voter dissatisfaction with both the ruling coalition and traditional opposition parties.

== See also ==
- Proposed Japanese constitutional referendum
