= Tomin First no Kai =

Tomin First no Kai 都民ファーストの会
- President: Takayuki Morimura
- Founder: Yuriko Koike
- Founded: 23 January 2017
- Headquarters: Toshima, Tokyo
- Ideology: Conservatism; Japanese nationalism Right-wing populism
- Political position: Centre-right to right-wing
- National affiliation: First no Kai (2021–); Kibō no Tō (2017–2018)
- Colours: Green
- Tokyo Metropolitan Assembly: 31 / 127

Party flag
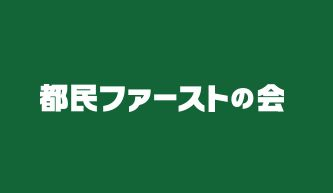

Website
- tomin1st.jp

Tomin First no Kai (Japanese: 都民ファーストの会, Hepburn: Tomin Fāsuto no Kai; Tokyoites First Party) is a regional political party in Tokyo, Japan.

The party was founded by Tokyo Governor Yuriko Koike in 2017. Koike later stepped down as the party's leader and is no longer officially affiliated with the party, however her policies and image continue to form the backbone of the party's platform and she continues to endorse and campaign for its candidates.

The party won the most seats in the Tokyo Metropolitan Assembly in 2017 in what was widely described as a wave election, the party later lost control of the Assembly in the 2021 election, becoming the second-largest party in the chamber.

== History ==
The group was founded by Yuriko Koike, governor of Tokyo since 2016. While still a member of the Liberal Democratic Party (LDP), Koike began laying the groundwork for a new political party in late 2016, when she established the Kibo no Juku ("Academy of Hope") program to train potential political candidates. The program had thousands of applicants.

On 31 May 2017, in advance of the upcoming local elections, she resigned from the LDP, officially becoming the new party's leader and forming an alliance with Komeito in an effort to secure a governing majority in Tokyo's parliament. On 3 July 2017, the alliance took a majority in the prefectural election, pushing out the Liberal Democratic Party with a combined 79 seats of the 127-seat assembly. All but one of Tomin First's candidates were victorious; senior LDP lawmaker Shigeru Ishiba called the election a "historic defeat" for the LDP.

Koike stepped down as party head shortly after the election and was replaced by Kazusa Noda; Noda himself resigned in September 2017 and was replaced by Chiharu Araki. Two key party members, Shun Otokita and Reiko Ueda, stepped down in October, citing the closed nature of the party's leadership and its restrictions on their activities in the metropolitan assembly.

Koike formed a sister national party, Kibō no Tō, in preparation for the 2017 general election. The party won 50 seats and 17.36% of the vote in the election, becoming the second largest opposition party in the House of Representatives, a result which was nevertheless described as an underperformance for the party given opinion polling and expectations. The party was later effectively disbanded in May 2018 after it merged with the Democratic Party to form the Democratic Party for the People.

In the 2021 Tokyo prefectural election, Tomin First lost a total of 15 seats, losing its status as the largest party in the Assembly to the LDP. Despite the loss of seats, the result was described by analysts as an unexpectedly strong showing from the party, as opinion polls and projections prior to the election had forecast the party losing far more seats.

On 4 October 2021, less than a month before the 2021 Japanese general election, the party announced it had formed a national party called First no Kai. Party leaders justified their decision to create the party by noting that the party, which is currently the second largest party in the Tokyo Metropolitan Assembly, lacks any national representation with the dissolving of Kibō. The party was described by its leader, Chiharu Araki, as being a centrist conservative party. The party plans to field candidates mainly in the Tokyo metropolitan area, but they said that Tokyo governor Yuriko Koike has not been asked to run for a seat.

== Platform ==
The party platform for the 2017 Tokyo election advocated open government and stricter penalties for public smoking. However, the party indicated relatively vague policy objectives in advance of the election, and many voted for the party simply in order to prevent the LDP from taking control of the legislature in the wake of its recent scandals.

== Presidents ==
No.	Name	Term of office		National affiliation
No.	Name	Took office	Left office	National affiliation
1	Kazusa Noda	23 January 2017	1 June 2017	
2	Yuriko Koike	1 June 2017	3 July 2017	
3	Kazusa Noda	3 July 2017	10 September 2017	
4	Chiharu Araki	10 September 2017	1 November 2022	Kibō no Tō (25 September 2017 – 7 May 2018)
5	Takayuki Morimura	5 November 2022	Incumbent	

== Election results ==
=== Gubernatorial elections ===
Election	Candidate	Votes	%	Result
2020	Supported Yuriko Koike (Note: Koike chose to run as an independent candidate while her campaign was endorsed and funded by Tomin First no Kai.)	3,661,371	59.7%	Won
2024	Supported Yuriko Koike	2,918,015	42.8%	Won

=== Metropolitan Assembly elections ===
Election	Leader	Votes	%	Seats	+/–	Rank
2017	Yuriko Koike	1,884,029	33.68%	49 / 127	▲49	▲1st
2021	Chiharu Araki	1,034,778	22.28%	31 / 127	▼15	▼2nd
2025	Takayuki Morimura	1,043,563	19.74%	31 / 127	0	▲1st
