= Former Hitachi Aircraft Tachikawa Factory Transformer Substation =

Hitachi Aircraft Tachikawa Factory Transformer Substation
- 旧日立航空機立川工場変電所 (Japanese)
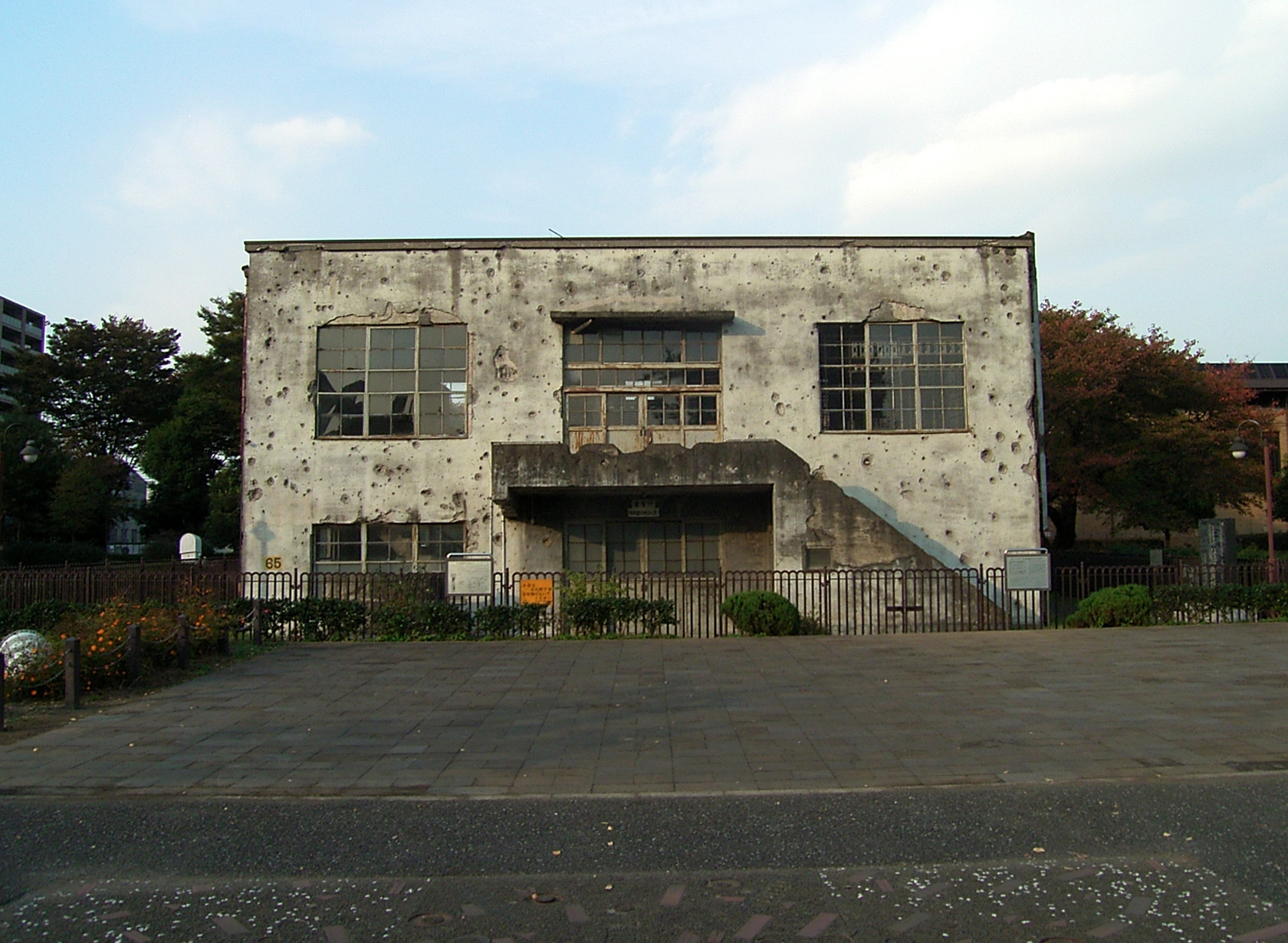
- Interactive map of Hitachi Aircraft Tachikawa Factory Transformer Substation
- Location: Higashiyamato, Tokyo

History
- Built: 1938

The Former Hitachi Aircraft Tachikawa Factory Transformer Substation (旧日立航空機立川工場変電所, kyuhitachikoukuukitachikawakoujyouhendensho) is a building in Higashiyamato, Tokyo. Damaged in US air raids during World War II, it is maintained as a war memorial.

== History ==
The building served as a transformer substation for the Hitachi Aircraft Company factory located in Tachikawa. Built in 1938, it was attacked repeatedly during the latter part of World War II. On February 17 it was attacked by US Navy F6F Hellcat fighters and other aircraft, and on April 19 by US Army Air Force P-51 Mustang aircraft. On April 29 B-29 bombing raids destroyed local factories and slightly damaged the substation.

After the war it operated until 1993. On October 1, 1995, it was designated as a cultural asset and is now located in a public park.

== Visits ==
The substation is open every Wednesday and Sunday between 10:30am-4pm. No registrations are necessary.
