= Takayuki Morimura =

Japanese politician (born 1973)

- 森村 隆行
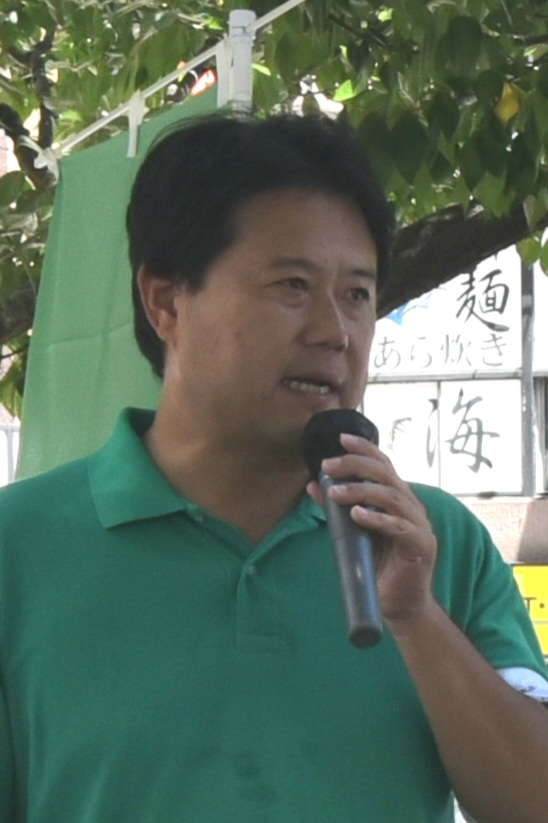
- Morimura in 2025

President of Tomin First no Kai
- Incumbent
- Assumed office 5 November 2022
- Preceded by: Chiharu Araki

Member of the Tokyo Metropolitan Assembly
- Incumbent
- Assumed office 23 July 2017
- Constituency: Ōme City

Personal details
- Born: 20 July 1973 (age 53) Isesaki, Gunma, Japan
- Party: Tomin First no Kai
- Education: University of Tokyo

Takayuki Morimura (森村隆行, Morimura Takayuki; born 20 July 1973) is a Japanese politician serving as a member of the Tokyo Metropolitan Assembly since 2017. He has served as president of Tomin First no Kai since 2022.
