= Proposed Japanese constitutional referendum =

Article 9 of the Japanese Constitution Referendum is a referendum that was expected to take place in 2020. In May 2017, then Japanese Prime Minister Shinzo Abe set a 2020 deadline for revising Article 9, which would legitimize the Japan Self-Defense Forces in the Japanese constitution. Abe and his Cabinet resigned in September 2020, due to Abe's health problems. Under his successor Yoshihide Suga, parliament revised referendum law in June 2021 to make it easier to vote by allowing temporary voting station. The move was considered as a step toward the possibility of the constitutional referendum taking place. Prime Minister Kishida renewed calls for the referendum in May 2023. In February after her landslide victory in the 2026 Japan election, Prime Minister Takaichi called for a debate on revising the constitution.

== Public opinion ==
Constitutional Amendment

Date	Firm	Sample size	Yes	No	Undecided	Lead
3 - 4 May 2026	Asahi Shimbun		49%	44%	7%	5%
2 - 3 May 2026	JNN		45%	40%	15%	5%
3 - 5 April 2026	NHK		38%	20%	38%	Tied
May 2025	Asahi Shimbun		53%	35%	12%	18%
4 - 6 April 2025	NHK		39%	17%	39%	Tied
4 - 5 May 2024	JNN		49%	35%	16%	14%
May 2024	Asahi Shimbun		53%	39%	8%	14%
5 - 7 April 2024	NHK		36%	19%	41%	5%
May 2023	Asahi Shimbun		52%	37%	11%	15%
29 - 30 April 2023	JNN		48%	35%	17%	13%
7 - 9 April 2023	NHK		35%	19%	42%	7%
May 2022	Asahi Shimbun		56%	37%	7%	19%
15 - 17 April 2022	NHK		35%	19%	42%	7%
23 - 25 April 2021	NHK		33%	20%	42%	9%
13 May 2021	Asahi Shimbun		45%	44%		1%
18 April 2021	Mainichi Shimbun		48%	31%		17%
May 2020	Asahi Shimbun		43%	46%	11%	3%
3 - 5 April 2020	NHK		32%	24%	41%	9%
May 2019	Asahi Shimbun		38%	47%	15%	9%
May 2018	Asahi Shimbun		44%	49%	7%	5%

Article 9

Date	Firm	Sample size	Yes	No	Undecided	Lead
3 -4 May 2026	Asahi Shimbun		30%	63%	7%	33%
3 - 5 April 2026	NHK		33%	31%	31%	2%
May 2025	Asahi Shimbun		35%	56%	9%	21%
4 - 6 April 2025	NHK		34%	28%	33%	1%
May 2024	Asahi Shimbun		32%	61%	7%	29%
5 - 7 April 2024	NHK		31%	29%	35%	4%
May 2023	Asahi Shimbun		37%	55%	8%	18%
7 - 9 April 2023	NHK		32%	30%	34%	2%
May 2022	Asahi Shimbun		33%	59%	8%	26%
15 - 17 April 2022	NHK		31%	30%	34%	3%
1 March – 11 April 2022	Kyodo News		50%	48%		2%
May 2021	Asahi Shimbun		30%	61%	9%	31%
23 - 25 April 2021	NHK		28%	32%	36%	4%
May 2020	Asahi Shimbun		27%	65%	8%	38%
3 - 5 April 2020	NHK		26%	37%	32%	5%
May 2019	Asahi Shimbun		28%	64%	8%	36%
May 2018	Asahi Shimbun		32%	63%	5%	31%
2017	Kyodo News		49%	47%		2%
May 2017	Asahi Shimbun		29%	63%		34%
2017	NHK		25%	57%		32%

== See also ==
- Legislation for Peace and Security
- SEALDs
