= Chiharu Araki =

Japanese politician

- 荒木 千陽
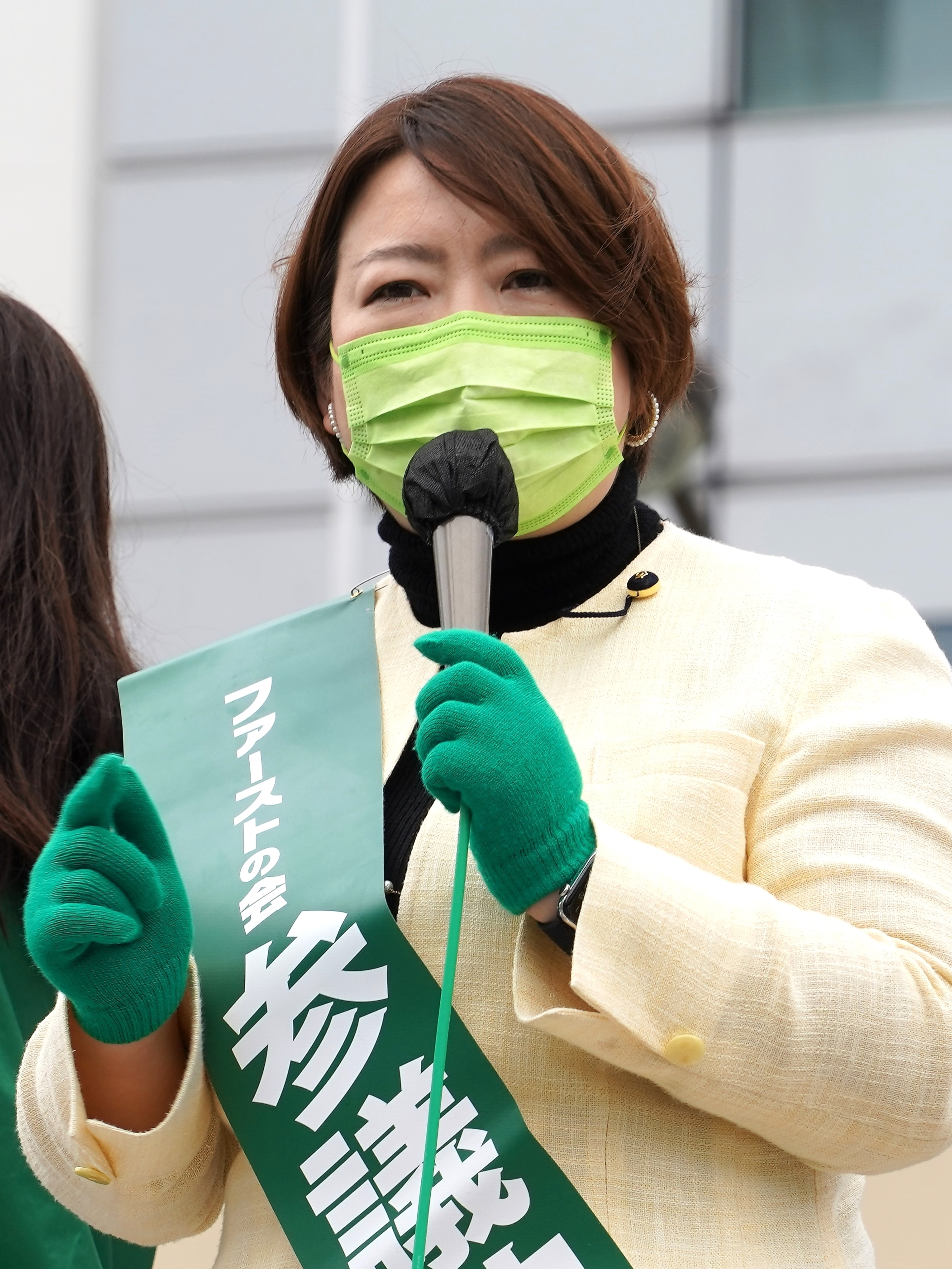
- Araki in 2022

President of Tomin First no Kai
- In office 11 September 2017 – 15 October 2022
- Preceded by: Kazusa Noda
- Succeeded by: Takayuki Morimura

Member of the Tokyo Metropolitan Assembly
- Incumbent
- Assumed office 9 July 2024
- Constituency: Nakano Ward
- In office 23 July 2017 – 22 June 2022
- Constituency: Nakano Ward

Personal details
- Born: 1 March 1982 (age 44) Kumamoto, Japan
- Party: Tomin First no Kai
- Education: Kurume University

Chiharu Araki (born 1 March 1982) is a Japanese politician who is currently serving as a member of the Tokyo Metropolitan Assembly and as the leader of the Tomin First no Kai political party.

Araki was born in Kumamoto Prefecture and graduated from the law school of Kurume University. She previously served as the secretary of Yuriko Koike, the current Governor of Tokyo.
