= Higashiyamato =

Higashiyamato 東大和市
- City
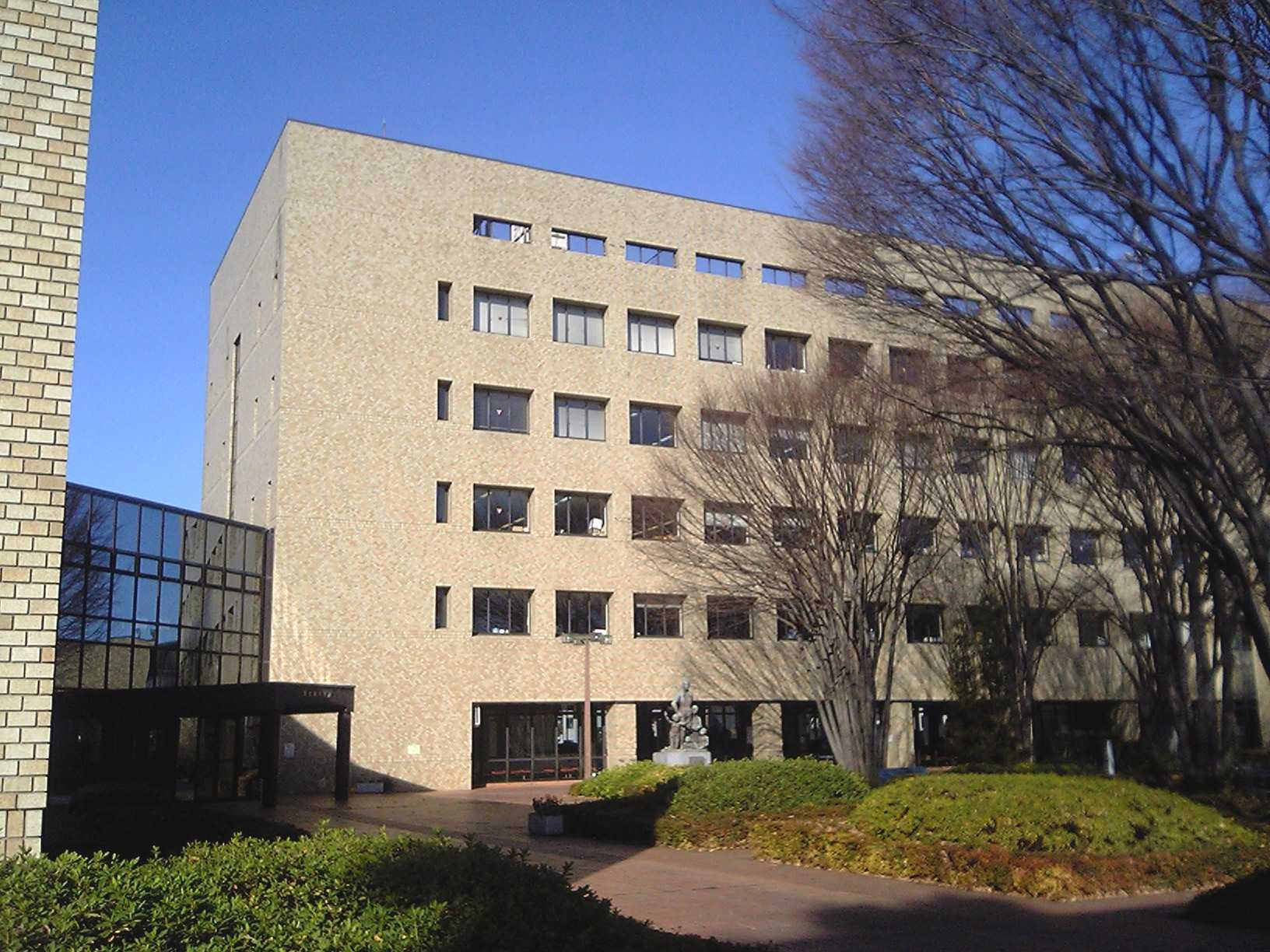
- Higashiyamato City Hall

- Flag Seal

- Location of Higashiyamato in Tokyo Prefecture

- Coordinates: 35°45′00″N 139°25′35″E
- Country: Japan
- Region: Kantō
- Prefecture: Tokyo

Area
  - Total: 13.42 km^{2} (5.18 sq mi)

Population (April 2021)
  - Total: 85,294
  - Density: 6,356/km^{2} (16,460/sq mi)
- Time zone: UTC+9 (Japan Standard Time)
- Tree: Zelkova serrata
- Flower: Azalea
- Phone number: 042-563-2111
- Address: 3-930 Chuo, Higashiyamato-shi, Tokyo-to 207-8585
- Website: Official website

Higashiyamato (東大和市, Higashi-yamato-shi) is a city located in the western portion of the Tokyo Metropolis, Japan. As of 1 April 2021, the city had an estimated population of 85,294, and a population density of 6400 persons per km^{2}. The total area of the city was 13.42 square kilometres (5.18 sq mi).

== Geography ==
Higashiyamato is approximately in the north-center of Tokyo Metropolis, on the Musashino Terrace, bordered by Saitama Prefecture to the north.

=== Surrounding municipalities ===
Saitama Prefecture

- Tokorozawa, Saitama

Tokyo Metropolis

- Higashimurayama
- Kodaira
- Musashimurayama
- Tachikawa

=== Climate ===
Higashiyamato has a humid subtropical climate (Köppen Cfa) characterized by warm summers and cool winters with light to no snowfall. The average annual temperature in Higashiyamato is 13.9 °C. The average annual rainfall is 1647 mm with September as the wettest month. The temperatures are highest on average in August, at around 25.4 °C, and lowest in January, at around 2.5 °C.

== Demographics ==
Per Japanese census data, the population of Higashiyamato has grown steadily over the past century.

Historical population
Year	Pop.	±%
1920	5,017	—
1930	5,442	+8.5%
1940	8,152	+49.8%
1950	12,366	+51.7%
1960	14,239	+15.1%
1970	46,173	+224.3%
1980	65,553	+42.0%
1990	75,132	+14.6%
2000	77,212	+2.8%
2010	83,068	+7.6%
2020	83,910	+1.0%

== History ==
The area of present-day Higashiyamato was part of ancient Musashi Province. In the post-Meiji Restoration cadastral reform of April 1, 1889, Takagi Village was established within Kitatama District of Kanagawa Prefecture. The entire district was transferred to the control of Tokyo Prefecture on April 1, 1893. Takagi Village merged with five neighboring villages to form Yamato Village on November 1, 1919. It was elevated to town status on May 3, 1954, and renamed as Higashiyamato on its promotion to a city, on October 1, 1970.

There was a Hitachi Aircraft Company factory located in Higashiyamato during World War II. It was destroyed by US bombing raids. The Former Hitachi Aircraft Tachikawa Factory Transformer Substation was damaged during air attacks but remains as a war memorial.

== Government ==
Higashiyamato has a mayor-council form of government with a directly elected mayor and a unicameral city council of 22 members. Higashiyamato, collectively with Higashimurayama and Musashimurayama contributes three members to the Tokyo Metropolitan Assembly. In terms of national politics, the city is part of Tokyo 20th district of the lower house of the Diet of Japan.

== Economy ==
Higashiyamato is primary a regional commercial center, and a bedroom community for central Tokyo.

== Education ==
The city's two public high schools are operated by the Tokyo Metropolitan Government Board of Education.

- Higashiyamato High School
- Higashiyamato Higashi High School

Higashiyamato has ten public elementary schools and five public junior high schools, operated by the city.

Municipal junior high schools:

- No. 1 (第一中学校)
- No. 2 (第二中学校)
- No. 3 (第三中学校)
- No. 4 (第四中学校)
- No. 5 (第五中学校)

Municipal elementary schools:

- No. 1 (第一小学校)
- No. 2 (第二小学校)
- No. 3 (第三小学校)
- No. 4 (第四小学校)
- No. 5 (第五小学校)
- No. 6 (第六小学校)
- No. 7 (第七小学校)
- No. 8 (第八小学校)
- No. 9 (第九小学校)
- No. 10 (第十小学校)

== Transportation ==
=== Railway ===
- Seibu Railway – Seibu Haijima Line

- Higashi-Yamatoshi

Tama Toshi Monorail Line

- Kamikitadai - Sakura-Kaidō - Tamagawa-Jōsui

=== Highway ===
- Higashiyamato is not served by any national highway.

== Sister cities ==
- Yamato, Fukushima, Japan

== Notable people from Higashiyamato ==
- Akihiro Hayashi, professional soccer player
- Hisashi Iwakuma, professional baseball player
- Yūya Yagira, actor
