= Tokyo Metropolitan Assembly =

Prefectural parliament of Tokyo

Tokyo Metropolitan Assembly 東京都議会 Tōkyō-to Gikai

Type
- Type: Unicameral

History
- Founded: January 1879 as Tōkyō-fukai; 1943 as Tōkyō-to-gikai; April 17, 1947 (current local autonomy law)

Leadership
- President: Hiroki Masuko (Tomin First) since February 2025
- Vice President: Koichi Kanno (LDP) since 2025

Structure
- Seats: 127
- Political groups: Government (41): Tomin First (32) (Note: Tomin First (31); Independent (1)); DPFP (9); Neutral (41): LDP (22) (Note: LDP (21); Independent (1)); Komeito (19); Opposition (45): CDP (22) (Note: CDP (17); TSN (1); Independent (4)); JCP (14); Sanseitō (3); Association for the Protection of Freedom (2); Independent (4)

Elections
- Last election: 22 June 2025
- Next election: 2029

Meeting place
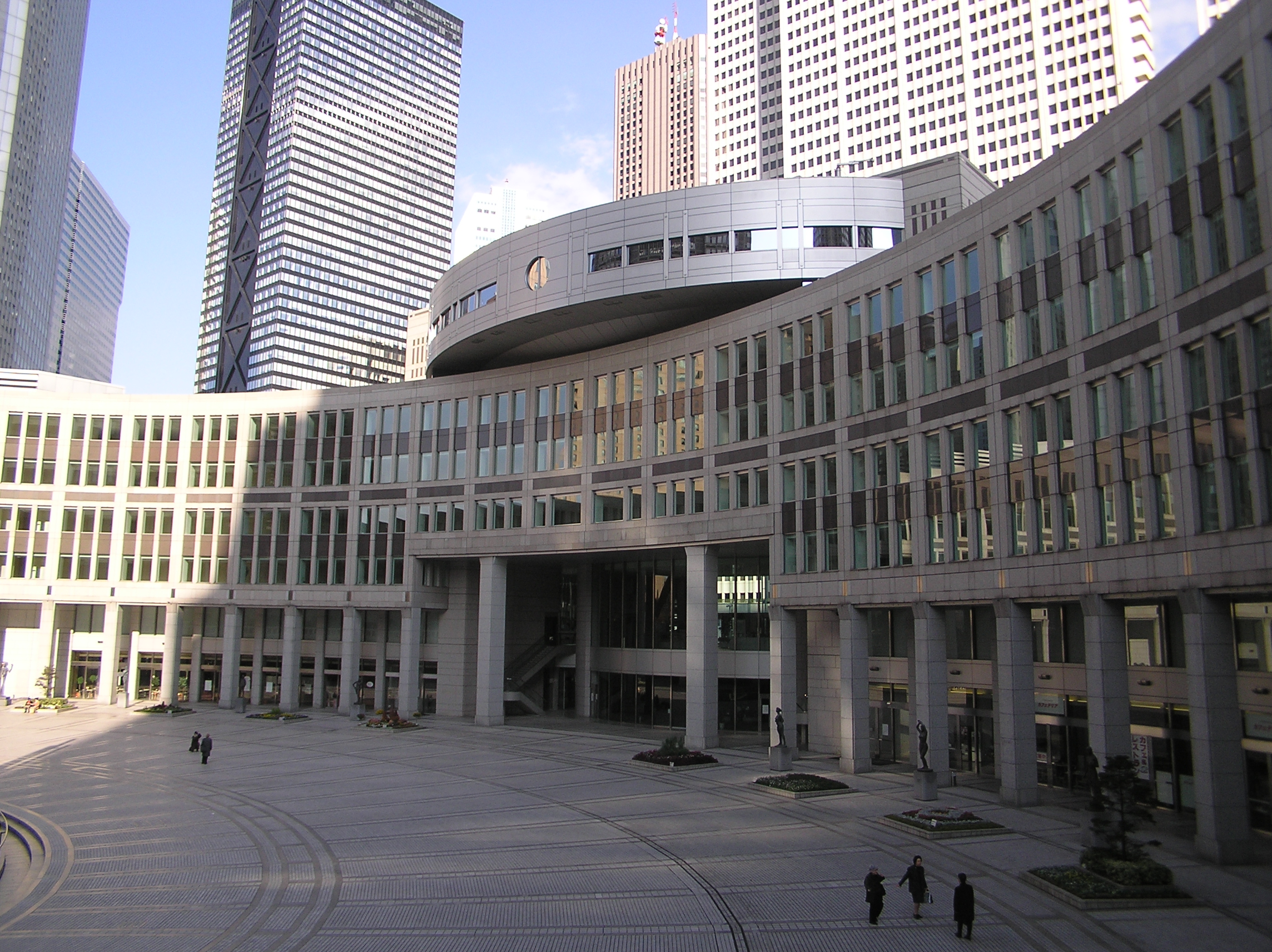
- Tokyo Metropolitan Assembly Building, Shinjuku

Website
- www.gikai.metro.tokyo.jp

The Tokyo Metropolitan Assembly (Japanese: 東京都議会, Hepburn: Tōkyō-to gikai) is the prefectural parliament of Tokyo Metropolis.

Its 127 members are elected every four years in 42 districts by single non-transferable vote. 23 electoral districts equal the special wards, another 18 districts are made up by the cities, towns and villages in the Western part of the prefecture, one district consists of the outlying islands (Ogasawara and Izu Islands).

The assembly is responsible for enacting and amending prefectural ordinances, approving the budget (5.7 billion yen in fiscal 2007) and voting on important administrative appointments made by the governor including the vice governors.

Due to the special nature of the Tokyo Metropolis compared to other prefectures, the Tokyo Metropolitan Assembly has certain powers that would usually fall into the responsibilities of municipal parliaments. This is to ensure efficient and unified urban administration for the 23 special wards that cover the former Tokyo City and comprise the urban core of the Greater Tokyo Area.

== Current composition ==
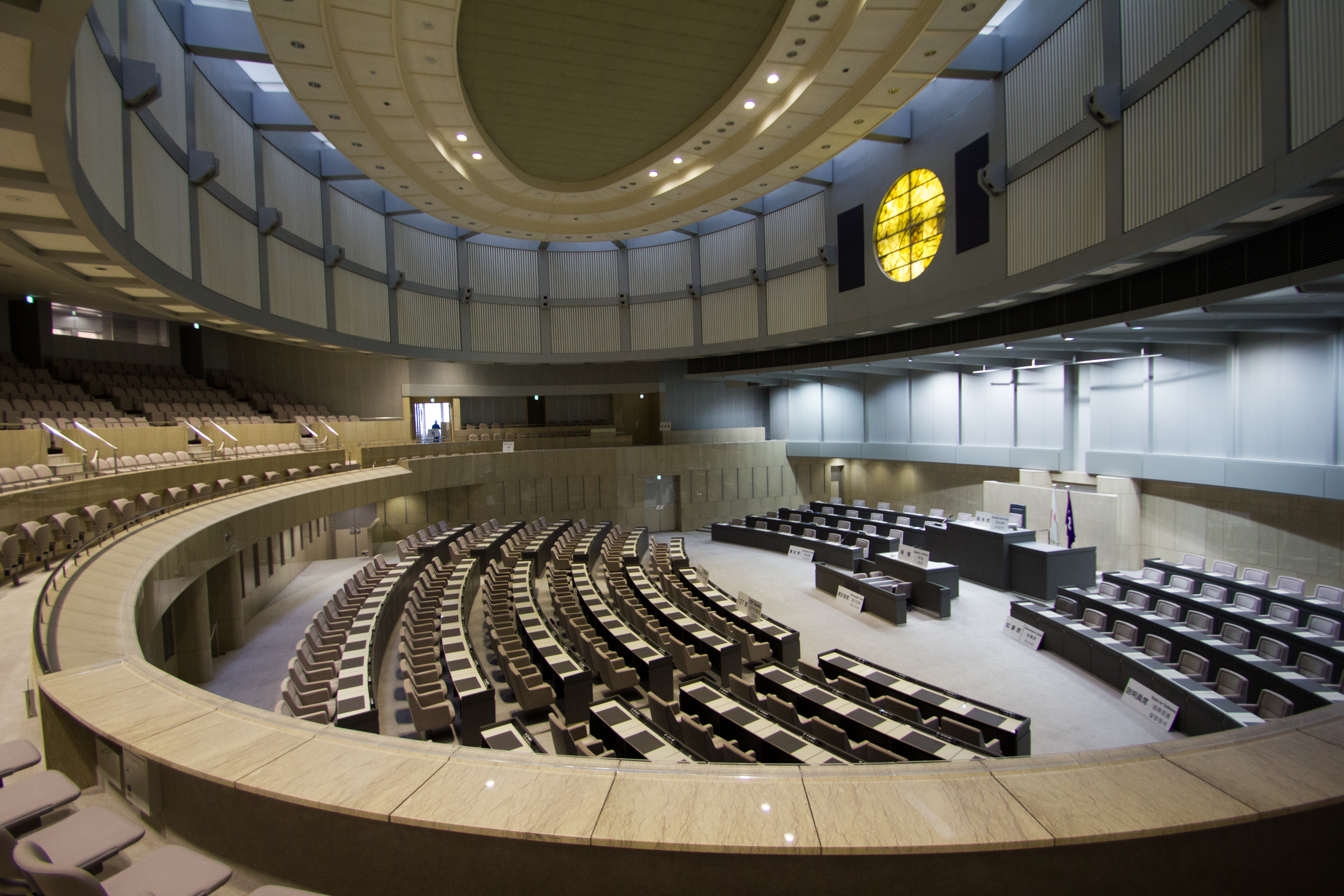
Assembly hall

The 2024 Tokyo gubernatorial election took place on 7 July 2024. As of 18 July 2025, the assembly is composed as follows:

Composition of the Tokyo Metropolitan Assembly
| Parliamentary group and party majority of members come from (if any) | Seats |
|---|---|
| Tomin fāsuto no kai Tōkyō togi-dan ("Tokyo Metropolis residents first group Tokyo Metropolitan Government"); Tomin First no Kai | 32 |
| Rikkenminshutō ("Metropolitan Assembly Constitutional Democratic Party"); Constitutional Democratic Party | 22 |
| Tōkyō-togikai jiyūminshutō ("Tokyo Metropolitan Assembly Liberal Democratic Party"); Liberal Democratic Party | 22 |
| Togikai Kōmeitō ("Metropolitan Assembly Komeito"); Kōmeitō | 19 |
| Nihon kyōsantō Tōkyō-togikai giin-dan ("Japanese Communist Party Tokyo Metropolitan Assembly members group"); Communist Party | 14 |
| Kokumin Minshu-tō ("Democratic Party For the People"); Democratic Party For the People | 9 |
| Sanseitō ("Party of Do it Yourself!!"); Sanseitō | 3 |
| Jiyū o Mamoru Kai ("Association for the Protection of Freedom") | 2 |
| Independents | 4 |
| Total | 127 |

== Electoral districts ==
Most electoral districts correspond to current municipalities, but several districts correspond to former counties (the counties, abolished as administrative unit in 1921, had initially by definition served as electoral districts for prefectural assemblies in the Empire), namely the West Tama (Nishi-Tama), North Tama (Kita-Tama) and South Tama (Minami-Tama) counties. The towns and villages on the islands have never been subordinate to counties, but to four subprefectures that together form the islands electoral district.

Electoral districts
| Special wards of Tokyo and Tokyo Islands | | | Western Tokyo/Tama area | | |
| District | Municipalities, subprefectures | Magnitude | District | Municipalities, counties | Magnitude |
|---|---|---|---|---|---|
| Chiyoda | Chiyoda ward | 1 | Hachiōji | Hachiōji city | 5 |
| Chūō | Chūō ward | 1 | Tachikawa | Tachikawa city | 2 |
| Minato | Minato ward | 2 | Musashino | Musashino city | 1 |
| Shinjuku | Shinjuku ward | 4 | Mitaka | Mitaka city | 2 |
| Bunkyō | Bunkyō ward | 2 | Ōme | Ōme city | 1 |
| Taitō | Taitō ward | 2 | Fuchū | Fuchū city | 2 |
| Sumida | Sumida ward | 3 | Akishima | Akishima city | 1 |
| Kōtō | Kōtō ward | 4 | Machida | Machida city | 3 |
| Shinagawa | Shinagawa ward | 4 | Koganei | Koganei city | 1 |
| Meguro | Meguro ward | 3 | Kodaira | Kodaira city | 2 |
| Ōta | Ōta ward | 8 | Hino | Hino city | 2 |
| Setagaya | Setagaya ward | 8 | Nishitōkyō | Nishitōkyō city | 2 |
| Shibuya | Shibuya ward | 2 | Nishi-Tama (West Tama) | Fussa city Hamura city Akiruno city Nishi-Tama County | 2 |
| Nakano | Nakano ward | 4 | Nishi-Tama (West Tama) | Fussa city Hamura city Akiruno city Nishi-Tama County | 2 |
| Suginami | Suginami ward | 6 | Minami-Tama (South Tama) | Tama city Inagi city | 2 |
| Toshima | Toshima ward | 3 | Minami-Tama (South Tama) | Tama city Inagi city | 2 |
| Kita | Kita ward | 4 | Kita-Tama (North Tama) 1 | Higashimurayama city Higashiyamato city Musashimurayama city | 3 |
| Arakawa | Arakawa ward | 2 | Kita-Tama (North Tama) 1 | Higashimurayama city Higashiyamato city Musashimurayama city | 3 |
| Itabashi | Itabashi ward | 5 | Kita-Tama (North Tama) 2 | Kokubunji city Kunitachi city | 2 |
| Nerima | Nerima ward | 6 | Kita-Tama (North Tama) 2 | Kokubunji city Kunitachi city | 2 |
| Adachi | Adachi ward | 6 | Kita-Tama (North Tama) 3 | Chōfu city Komae city | 2 |
| Katsushika | Katsushika ward | 4 | Kita-Tama (North Tama) 3 | Chōfu city Komae city | 2 |
| Edogawa | Edogawa ward | 5 | Kita-Tama (North Tama) 4 | Kiyose city Higashikurume city | 2 |
| Islands | Tokyo Islands (Ōshima Subprefecture; Miyake Subprefecture; Hachijō Subprefecture; Ogasawara Subprefecture) | 1 | Kita-Tama (North Tama) 4 | Kiyose city Higashikurume city | 2 |

== Incidents ==
=== Heckling incident ===
On June 18, 2014, an assemblywoman, Ayaka Shiomura, was heckled in the Tokyo Metropolitan Assembly meeting when she asked questions about how to save women who have difficulty in pregnancy and childbirth. The comments were "Can't you have a baby?" (産めないのか) and "Hurry up and get married!" (早く結婚しろ). When assembly member Akihiro Suzuki was asked whether he was one of the hecklers, he denied heckling Shiomura. After the LDP identified Suzuki as the heckler on June 23, he came forward and made a formal, public apology, admitting he was one of the people who heckled Shiomura. Suzuki claimed responsibility for the first comment, but it was not clear who stated the latter. Yōichi Masuzoe, the Governor of Tokyo Metropolis, and fellow assembly member, apparently took part in the heckling. Other hecklers never came forward. On June 25, the assembly passed a resolution, aiming to restore trust, and settle the issue.

==== Reactions ====
Some believe that heckling can "give humor" and make discussion smooth and thus view heckling positively. Morita Minoru, a Japanese political commentator, pointed out that the number of "vulgar heckles" has increased. Some argue sexism is a major reason. For example, Tabojin Toshio, who oversaw for the latest Tokyo Metropolitan Assembly election, said that he did not understand why this is considered sexism (2014).

Several members of Abe's cabinet criticized the incident - then-chief cabinet secretary Yoshihide Suga encouraged the Assembly to "clean up its act", while health minister Norihisa Tamura and Minister of State for the Declining Birthrate Masako Mori respectively described the comments as "deeply disrespectful to women" and "totally unacceptable". The Guardian, Reuters, and the Wall Street Journal reported on and analyzed the incident.

== See also ==
- Tokyo Metropolitan Government
