= Aichi's Diet electoral districts =

Aichi's House of Representatives districts since 2017

All seats

Nagoya seats

Aichi Prefecture currently sends 34 elected members to the Diet of Japan, 26 to the House of Representatives and 8 to the House of Councillors.

== House of Representatives ==
The current House of Representatives Aichi delegation consists of 17 LDP, 4 DPP, 2 CRA, 1 Sanseitō, 1 Ishin, and 1 Genzei-Yukoku.

=== Constituency seats ===
District	Representative	Party	Incumbency
1st	Takashi Kawamura	Genzei-Yukoku	28 October 2024 – present
2nd	Motohisa Furukawa	DPP	21 October 1996 – present
3rd	Yoshihiko Mizuno	LDP	9 February 2026 – present
4th	Shōzō Kudō	LDP	17 December 2012 – present
5th	Yasuhiro Okamoto	LDP	9 February 2026 – present
6th	Hideki Niwa	LDP	24 April 2011 – present
7th	Saria Hino	DPP	28 October 2024 – present
8th	Tadahiko Itō	LDP	17 December 2012 – present
9th	Yasumasa Nagasaka	LDP	17 December 2012 – present
10th	Shinji Wakayama	LDP	28 October 2024 – present
11th	Midori Tanno	DPP	28 October 2024 – present
12th	Shuhei Aoyama	LDP	9 February 2026 – present
13th	Taku Ishii	LDP	9 February 2026 – present
14th	Soichiro Imaeda	LDP	17 December 2012 – present
15th	Yukinori Nemoto	LDP	17 December 2012 – present
16th	Shizuo Yamashita	LDP	9 February 2026 – present

=== PR seats ===
Aichi Prefecture is part of the Tokai proportional representation block. In the current Diet, there are 10 Representatives from Aichi elected through the Tokai PR block.

Party	Representative	District contested	Incumbency
LDP	Junji Suzuki	Aichi 7th	9 February 2026 – present
LDP	Hiromichi Kumada	Aichi 1st	9 February 2026 – present
LDP	Hideki Tsuji	Aichi 2nd	9 February 2026 – present
LDP	Tadamori Fujisawa	Aichi 11th	9 February 2026 – present
LDP	Takamoto Nakagawa	None	9 February 2026 – present
CRA	Akiyoshi Inukai	None	9 February 2026 – present
CRA	Kazuhiko Shigetoku	Aichi 12th	17 December 2012 – present
DPP	Toru Fukuta	Aichi 16th	28 October 2024 – present
Sanseitō	Airi Watanabe	Aichi 5th	9 February 2026 – present
Ishin	Kenichiro Seki	Aichi 15th	9 February 2026 – present

== House of Councillors ==
The current House of Councillors Aichi delegation consists of 2 LDP, 2 CDP, 2 DPP, 1 Komeito, and 1 Sanseitō. The members are elected from the Aichi at-large district.

Class	#	Councillors	Party	Term ends	Incumbency
2022	1	Masahito Fujikawa	LDP	25 July 2028	26 July 2010 – present
2022	2	Ryūji Satomi	Komeito	25 July 2028	26 July 2016 – present
2022	3	Yoshitaka Saitō	CDP	25 July 2028	26 July 2010 – present
2022	4	Takae Itō	DPP	25 July 2028	26 July 2016 – present
2025	1	Koichi Mizuno	DPP	28 July 2031	29 July 2025 – present
2025	2	Maiko Tajima	CDP	28 July 2031	29 July 2019 – present
2025	3	Junko Sugimoto	Sanseitō	28 July 2031	29 July 2025 – present
2025	4	Yasuyuki Sakai	LDP	28 July 2031	29 July 2013 – present
