= October 2017 Democratic Party (Japan, 2016) leadership election =

Political party election in Japan

October 2017 Democratic Party leadership election
- 31 October 2017
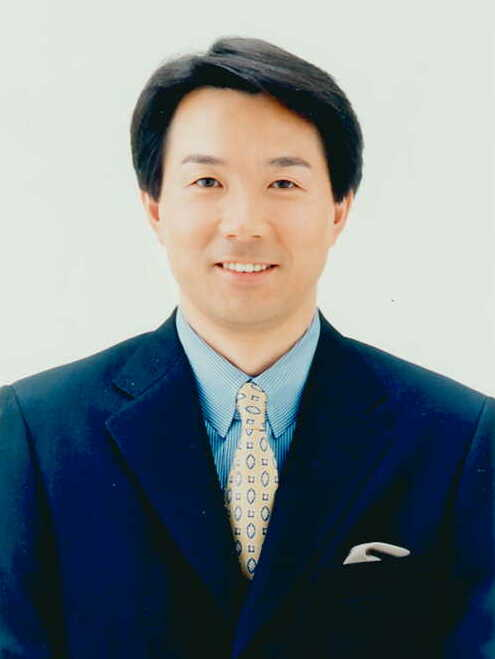
Candidate	Kohei Otsuka
Leader's seat	Aichi at-large
Result	Unopposed
President before election
Seiji Maehara
Elected President
Kohei Otsuka

The October 2017 Democratic Party presidential election was held on 31 October 2017 to replace the previous president Seiji Maehara, who resigned on 23 October after the failure of his election strategy in the 2017 general election.

Kohei Otsuka was the only candidate in the race and therefore was elected as the new president unopposed.

== Background ==
Maehara had been elected leader less than two months earlier on 1 September in a contest that pitted the party's conservative and liberal wings against one another. Maehara, a conservative, emerged victorious by a comfortable margin, but encountered early difficulties after abruptly withdrawing his preferred choice for secretary-general, Shiori Yamao, due to internal discontent. Days later, allegations that Yamao had engaged in an extramarital affair surfaced, further damaging perception of Maehara's judgment. Yamao denied the allegations but resigned from the party. Anger deepened after Maehara reneged on his promise to end the party's electoral alliance with the Japanese Communist Party, resulting in the defection of five Diet members.

On the 25th, Prime Minister Shinzo Abe called a snap election for the House of Representatives. Maehara and the Democratic Party were unprepared for a sudden campaign, not having drafted a platform and still facing an internal crisis. Furthermore, popular Tokyo governor Yuriko Koike simultaneously announced the launch of her own party, Kibō no Tō (KnT), to contest the election. KnT took up a position on the centre-right and was joined by many members who had left the party in recent months, including prominent conservatives Goshi Hosono and Akihisa Nagashima. In order to unify the opposition and avoid further internal struggles, Maehara proposed that the DP not run any candidates in the coming election, and members instead apply to run for KnT. The plan was simplified by the fact that KnT planned to run only around 100 candidates, mostly in the Tokyo area. The proposal was approved by the party executive on the 28th.

In response, Koike stated that candidates would not be accepted if they opposed her positions on constitutional reform and the Japan Self-Defence Forces. This led to the exclusion of around 60 to 70 incumbents from the DP's liberal wing, including Maehara's recent leadership rival Yukio Edano. In response, Edano and his allies launched the Constitutional Democratic Party of Japan (CDP) on 2 October. This resulted in the DP being split three ways. About half of KnT's candidates were DP members, while a number of others ran for the CDP or as independents. Naoto Kan and Banri Kaieda ran for the CDP, while Maehara, Yoshihiko Noda, and Katsuya Okada ran as independents. Meanwhile, a majority of DP members of the House of Councillors stated they would not join KnT after the election. The result of the election was a landslide for the incumbent government, which won 313 seats. The CDP emerged in second place with 55, followed by just 50 for KnT. Sixteen DP members were also elected as independents.

Maehara announced his resignation as leader the day after the election. While a leadership ballot was organised, the party convened and voted to revoke its plans to merge with Kibō no Tō.

== Electoral system ==
Candidates were required to gather endorsements from twenty (maximum 25) of the party's members of the National Diet in order to stand. Each Diet member was eligible to vote (64 total). If no candidate won more than 50% of votes, a runoff was to be held the same day. Nominations were taken on the 31st and the election held the same day.

== Candidates ==
Candidate	Offices held
Kohei Otsuka (age 58); Aichi Prefecture	Member of the House of Councillors (2001–)

=== Sponsors ===
Kohei Otsuka (24)
House of Councillors
- Minoru Yanagida
- Tetsuji Isozaki
- Yoshifumi Hamano
- Takae Itō
- Toshio Ishigami
- Makoto Hamaguchi
- Wakako Yata
- Kazuya Shimba
- Yuichiro Hata
- Takanori Kawai
- Masao Kobayashi
- Shinji Morimoto
- Motohiro Ōno
- Saori Yoshikawa
- Shinkun Haku
- Yoshitaka Saitō
- Kusuo Oshima
- Teruhiko Mashiko
- Shoji Namba
- Yukihito Koga
- Kuniyoshi Noda
- Hiroe Makiyama
- Yukihisa Fujita
- Mitsuru Sakurai

=== Withdrew ===
- Renhō, former president of the Democratic Party (2016–17) and member of the House of Councillors (2004–)
- Toshio Ogawa, former Minister of Justice (2012) and member of the House of Councillors (1998–)

=== Declined ===
- Katsuya Okada, former president of the Democratic Party (2004–05, 2014–16), minister for foreign affairs (2008–09) and member of the House of Representatives (1990–)

== Contest ==
There was pressure inside the party to avoid a contested election due to the party's diminished strength. Despite some calls for former leader Katsuya Okada to return, there was a consensus that the new leader should be chosen from the House of Councillors, which now counted 47 of the party's 64 Diet members. Former party president Renhō, former justice minister Toshio Ogawa, and deputy policy chief Kohei Otsuka were considered the main candidates. Kohei was favoured due to his lack of executive experience.

By the morning of the 31st, Otsuka had received the required 20 sponsors to run. Renhō also sought to stand, but had difficulty securing the necessary support; members expressed concern about the party's image if she were to return so soon after her resignation in July. Otsuka was backed by the party right, including members close to Maehara and Goshi Hosono, and the right-leaning trade unions. Renhō was supported by left-leaning sectors of the party and reportedly withdrew after Otsuka assured her he would not split the party.

Otsuka was the sole candidate and declared president without a vote. After taking office, he declared his intention to work for a reconciliation of the DP, CDP, and Kibō no Tō to reunify the opposition.
