= 2020 Democratic Party for the People leadership election =

Political party election in Japan

- 18 December 2020
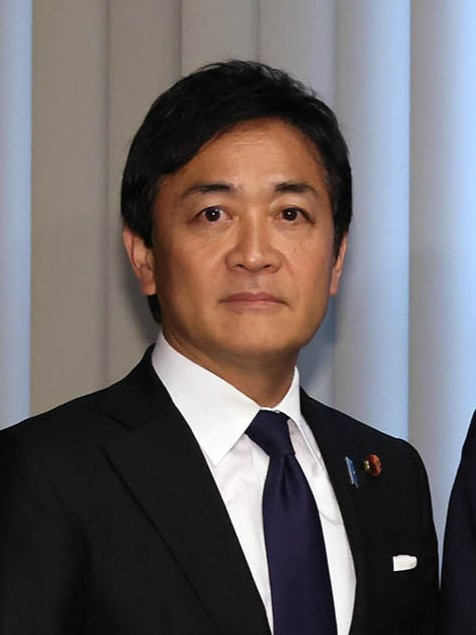

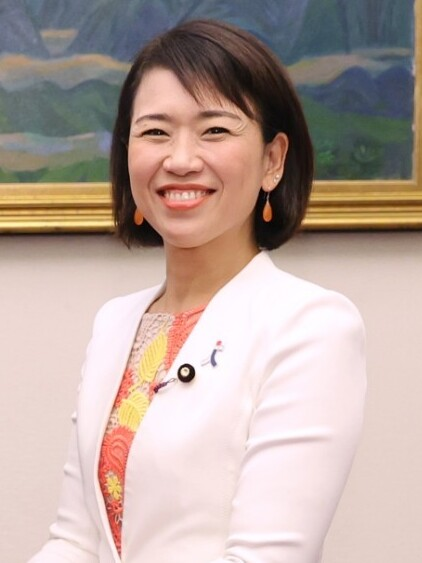
Candidate	Yuichiro Tamaki	Takae Itō
Leader's seat	Kagawa 2nd	Aichi at-large
Diet members	16	16
Party members	18	5
Local assembly	19	4
Candidates	12	1
Total points	65 (71.4%)	26 (28.6%)
Leader before election
Yuichiro Tamaki
Elected Leader
Yuichiro Tamaki

The 2020 Democratic Party For the People leadership election was held on 18 December 2020. It was the first presidential election since the refoundation of the party. Incumbent president Yuichiro Tamaki was re-elected overwhelmingly against representative Takae Itō.

== Background ==
The Democratic Party for the People (DPFP) was originally founded in the wake of the 2017 election, which saw the major opposition Democratic Party split three ways. The DPFP was created in May 2018 by a merger of the Democratic Party and Kibo no To, but remained smaller than the rival Constitutional Democratic Party (CDP). In addition, a number of former Democrats remained independents and formed their own group in the House of Representatives. Further efforts were made in 2019 and 2020 to unify the opposition. The CDP and DPFP held unsuccessful negotiations to merge in late 2019. Another attempt in mid-2020 resulted in a split between the party majority, who voted in favour of a merger, and a group led by party leader Tamaki who refused to join. The new merged party, which retained the CDP name and branding, held its inaugural conference on 10 September. The DPFP was officially dissolved on the 11th; it was re-founded on the 15th by fifteen Diet members, using the same name and branding. Tamaki was chosen to continue as leader pending an election near the end of the year.

In October, Tamaki announced that a leadership election would be held in December. He stated that grassroots members and local assembly officials would be included in the voting. On 4 November, the party scheduled nominations for 8 December and the election itself for 18 December. Members and supporters were able to vote using LINE.

== Electoral system ==
Unlike in previous elections for the DPFP and its predecessors, candidates did not require sponsors to qualify for the election. Any member of the Diet could self-nominate to stand.

The election was conducted via a points system:

- Each of the party's members of the National Diet had a vote worth two points. (32 points total)
- Registered party members or supporters could vote via mail or online. Points for this tier were awarded to candidates in proportion to votes won. (23 points total)
- Each of the party's members of local councils or prefectural assemblies could vote via mail or online. Points for this tier were awarded to candidates in proportion to votes won. (23 points total)
- Each of the party's approved candidates for future Diet elections had a vote worth one point. (13 points total)

In order to win, a candidate must secure more than 50% of points. If no candidate won more than 50%, a runoff was to be held the same day. In the runoff, only Diet members and approved candidates could vote.

== Candidates ==
Candidate	Offices held
Yuichiro Tamaki (age 51); Kagawa Prefecture	Member of the House of Representatives (2009–); President of the Democratic Party for the People (2018–)
Takae Itō (age 45); Aichi Prefecture	Member of the House of Councillors (2016–)

=== Declined ===
- Shinya Adachi, member of the House of Councillors (2004–)
- Seiji Maehara, member of the House of Representatives (1993–), former Minister for Foreign Affairs (2010–11) and President of the Democratic Party (2017)
- Shiori Yamao, member of the House of Representatives (2009–12, 2014–)

== Contest ==
Tamaki and Itō both attended an information session on 2 December and registered their candidacies. Itō was considered a close ally of Tamaki and served as the party's executive director; the Mainichi Shimbun suggested that her bid was an effort to promote the party's image rather than a serious challenge. After nominations, she admitted: "I'd been agonizing over whether to run until today. If anyone else had raised their hand, I was prepared to withdraw." The two candidates avoided divisive internal issues and spent most of the campaign discussing policy.

Tamaki defined the new DPFP as a "reformist, centrist party that proposes policies," and stated his focus would be on expanding the party's organisation ahead of the next election. When asked by reporters about her candidacy, Itō said "I feel strongly that we cannot have an uncontested election." She emphasised that she wanted to show "the potential of politics," that a person can run for leadership as a first-term legislator and while raising a child. She declared children and childcare as her top policy priorities, calling for the establishment of a new ministry for these areas. In regards to opposition cooperation, Itō described it as "an absolute requirement," while Tamaki did not want to "get lost among the opposition parties" and focus on "establishing our party's position".

== Results ==
Candidate	Diet members			Party members & supporters			Local assembly members			Diet candidates			Total
Candidate	Votes	%	Points	Votes	%	Points	Votes	%	Points	Votes	%	Points	Total
Yuichiro Tamaki	8	50.0	16	7,463	76.8	18	106	80.9	19	12	92.3	12	65
Takae Itō	8	50.0	16	2,260	23.2	5	25	19.1	4	1	7.7	1	26
Total	16	100.0	32	9,723	100.0	23	131	100.0	23	13	100.0	13	91
Invalid	0			39			0			0			
Turnout	16	100.0		9,762	39.6		131	85.6		13	100.0		
Eligible	16			24,631			153			13			
Source: Wayback Machine
