= 2018 Democratic Party for the People leadership election =

Political party election in Japan

- 4 September 2018
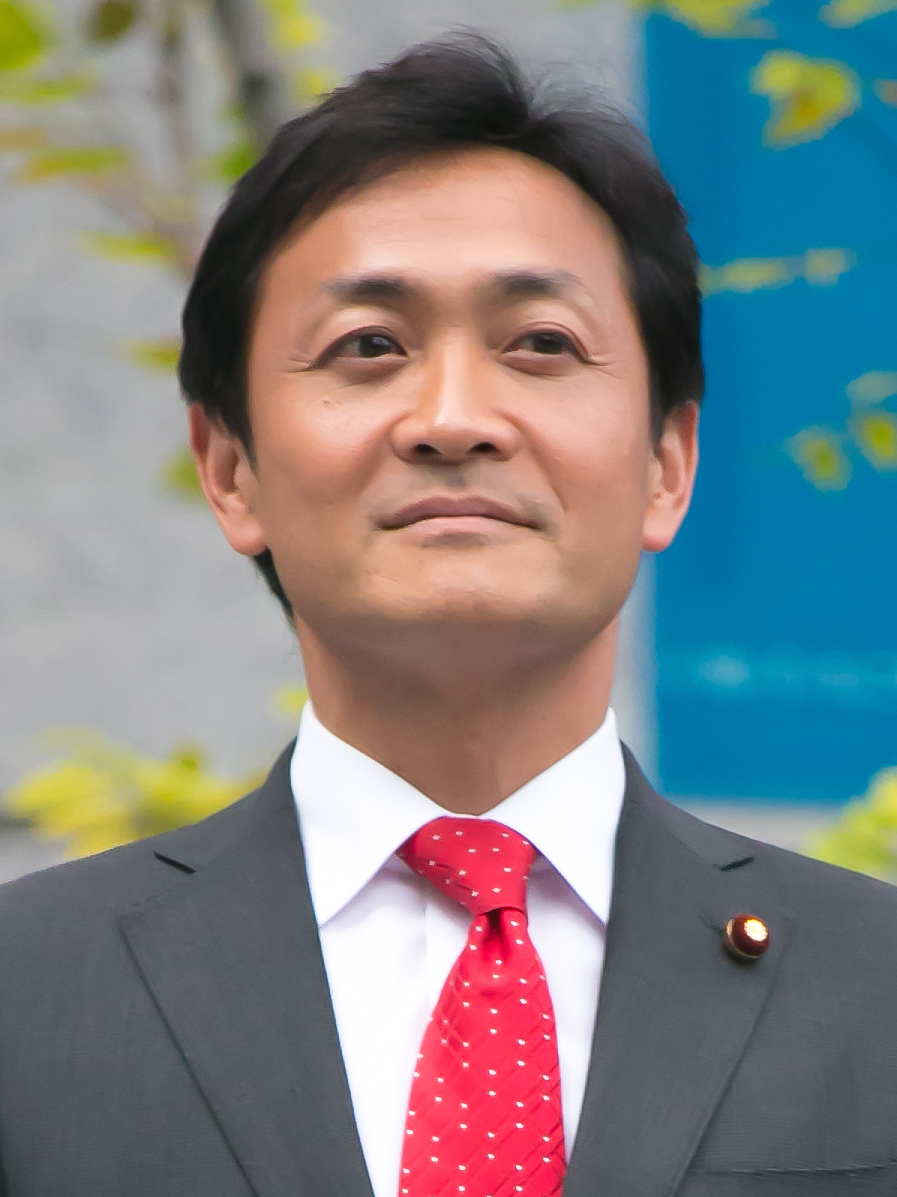

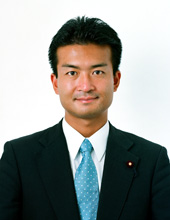
Candidate	Yuichiro Tamaki	Keisuke Tsumura
Leader's seat	Kagawa 2nd	Chūgoku PR
Diet members	82	36
Party members	55	16
Local assembly	51	20
Candidates	16	2
Total points	204 (73.4%)	74 (26.6%)
Leader before election
Yuichiro Tamaki
Kohei Otsuka
Elected Leader
Yuichiro Tamaki

The 2018 Democratic Party For the People leadership election was held on 4 September 2018 in accordance with the end of the presidential term which had commenced in May. It was the first leadership election since the formation of the party from the merger of the Democratic Party and Kibō no Tō earlier in the year. The race was held to choose a successor to interim leaders Yuichiro Tamaki and Kohei Otsuka.

Interim co-leader Tamaki ran for re-election and won overwhelmingly against representative Keisuke Tsumura.

== Background ==
After the 2017 Japanese general election, former members of the Democratic Party were split between three parties: the remaining DP, Kibō no Tō (KnT), and the Constitutional Democratic Party (CDP). KnT and the DP, who had more common ground compared to the liberal CDP, sought closer cooperation in the aftermath. In January 2018, the two parties unsuccessfully attempted to negotiate a joint parliamentary group. At the urging of support groups such as Rengo and local DP branches, renewed talks began at the end of March, this time for a full merger. Negotiations continued throughout April, culminating in the foundation of a new party on 7 May, named Kokumin Minshu-tō ("National Democratic Party" or "Democratic Party for the People," DPFP). The two groups counted 107 Diet members between them, but only 62 agreed to join the new party. Ten legislators including Toshio Ogawa instead defected to the CDP, while a group of five formed a rump new Kibō no Tō led by Shigefumi Matsuzawa. The remaining members resigned from the party and became independent, including Yoshihiko Noda, Katsuya Okada, Shinji Tarutoko, Hiroshi Ogushi, Jun Azumi, and Goshi Hosono.

Kibō no Tō leader Yuichiro Tamaki and DP leader Kohei Otsuka became interim co-leaders of the new DPFP pending a leadership election in September. In June, the party decided to schedule the contest for early September to avoid overlap with the Liberal Democratic Party contest which took place in the middle of the month. The date of nominations was set for 22 August, with the election to take place on 4 September.

== Electoral system ==
The number of sponsors required to run was set at 15% of the Diet caucus and an equal number of local assembly members. With the party counting 62 members of the Diet, this translated to 10 legislators and 10 local assembly members.

The election was conducted via a points system:

- Each of the party's members of the National Diet had a vote worth two points. (124 points total)
- Registered party members or supporters could vote via mail or online. Points for this tier were awarded to candidates in proportion to votes won. (71 points total)
- Each of the party's members of local councils or prefectural assemblies could vote via mail or online. Points for this tier were awarded to candidates in proportion to votes won. (71 points total)
- Each of the party's approved candidates for future Diet elections had a vote worth one point. (18 points total)

In order to win, a candidate must secure more than 50% of points. If no candidate won more than 50%, a runoff was to be held the same day. In the runoff, only Diet members and approved candidates could vote.

On 31 July, the number of party members was reported to be 76,596, a decline of 68% compared to the Democratic Party a year earlier. The number of local council and prefectural officials was reported as 761.

== Candidates ==
Candidate	Offices held
Yuichiro Tamaki (age 49); Kagawa Prefecture	Member of the House of Representatives (2009–); President of Kibō no Tō (2017–)
Keisuke Tsumura (age 46); Okayama Prefecture	Member of the House of Representatives (2003–)

=== Sponsors ===
Yuichiro Tamaki (14/14) (Note: Tamaki initially received twenty endorsements from each category, but six local assembly members failed to submit their letters of recommendation by the deadline. As a result, their endorsements and those of an equal number of Diet members were invalidated.)	Keisuke Tsumura (10/10)
Diet members: Shinichiro Furumoto; Yoshifumi Hamano; Kazuhiro Haraguchi; Hirofumi Hirano; Tetsuji Isozaki; Takae Itō; Kenta Izumi; Kazuya Kondo; Shinji Oguma; Kohei Otsuka; Mitsuru Sakurai; Yoichi Shiraishi; Minoru Yanagida; Wakako Yata; ~~Yamato Aoyama~~; ~~Satoshi Asano~~; ~~Hideko Nishioka~~; ~~Toshikazu Morita~~; ~~Takanori Kawai~~; ~~Kazuya Shimba~~; Local assembly members: Naoya Ebihara; Hiroshi Fukabori; Masaki Hiraiwa; Jun'ichi Matsumoto; Hiroshi Miura; Masashi Miyashita; Koichi Mukoyama; Kazuaki Nagaoka; Yoshihiro Nagatomo; Mamoru Okamoto; Takaaki Saito; Kazuhiro Shiraishi; Naoko Tabata; Kaname Yoshida; ~~Tomohito Chiba~~; ~~Misaki Hibi~~; ~~Fujino Yoshitsugu~~; ~~Gaku Kashiwagi~~; ~~Kazutami Fuda~~; ~~Kumiko Sogabe~~	Diet members: Kentaro Genma; Yuichi Goto; Shuji Inatomi; Yasuko Komiyama; Yoshio Maki; Hiroyuki Nagahama; Motohiro Ōno; Takeshi Shina; Takashi Shinohara; Tatsumaru Yamaoka; Local assembly members: Shota Heya; Makoto Hitomi; Masaomi Ino; Shingo Ishida; Toshiki Mochizuki; Miho Nomura; Tetsuji Sato; Takahiko Tamura; Shinsuke Tanaka; Tomoyuki Uesugi

=== Withdrew ===
- Michiyoshi Yunoki, member of the House of Representatives (2005–)

=== Declined ===
- Kenta Izumi, member of the House of Representatives (2003–2016, 2016–) and Secretary-General of the DPFP (2018–) – (endorsed Tamaki)
- Kazuhiro Haraguchi, member of the House of Representatives (1996–) and Minister for Internal Affairs and Communications (2009–10) – (endorsed Tamaki)

== Contest ==
There was initial speculation that interim leader Tamaki may be the only candidate and win unopposed. Despite reports from outlets of dissatisfaction with Tamaki's conciliatory course toward the government, which had failed to lift the party's ratings, there was a perception that successive splits and diminished numbers had led to a lack of competition within the party. There were also fears that an open contest could lead to another party split. Kenta Izumi, Shu Watanabe, and Kazuhiro Haraguchi were reported to have support from "anti-mainstream" members.

On 5 August, Keisuke Tsumura voiced his intention to stand, stating he wanted to change Tamaki's "solutions over confrontation" policy and align more firmly with the other opposition parties. He strongly criticised the policies of the current leadership at an information session for prospective candidates on the 9th and stated he was confident he could reach the ten sponsorships required to run. The session was attended by Tamaki as well as Masato Imai and Michiyoshi Yunoki, fellow anti-Tamaki members who were understood to be seeking to run separately from Tsumura; Imai was believed to favour Kazunori Yamanoi.

Tamaki announced his candidacy on the 10th, acknowledging that his strategy had been "misunderstood" and stated that he would make adjustments. He stated that his goal would be to maximise the performance of the combined opposition in the upper house elections. He called for a joint parliamentary group between the CDP and DPFP, but opposed working with the Communist Party. Tsumura formally launched his bid on the 13th, blaming the current executive for the party's decline. He declared his intention to seek "full-scale" cooperation with other opposition parties and win the 2019 upper house elections, pledging to resign if he failed. He criticised Tamaki's hopes for a united parliamentary group as unrealistic, and instead proposed a joint committee with the group of former DP independents led by Katsuya Okada to coordinate policy and candidates. He also took a softer line against the Communist Party, saying: "If there is a good candidate nominated by the Communist Party, we should identify them and then coordinate."

Tamaki was supported by the party leadership, including secretary-general Motohisa Furukawa, Shūhei Kishimoto, Kenta Izumi and outgoing co-leader Kohei Otsuka. He also received support from private sector trade unions affiliated with Rengo, who favoured his flexible stances. Tsumura was supported by Takeshi Shina, Yoshio Maki, and members affiliated with the Jisei-kai, a faction formerly led by Goshi Hosono in the Democratic Party.

By 21 August, Tamaki had far surpassed the ten sponsorships required to stand; he ultimately received twenty. Tsumura's camp reported that he was "one step away" and continued lobbying into the next day. He was able to secure enough support just prior to nominations being taken; the Mainichi Shimbun reported that senior Diet members decided to back him to avoid an uncontested ballot, which they believed would damage the party's image. On the morning of nominations, anti-Tamaki legislator Yunoki, who had considered running in the contest, held a press conference announcing his resignation from the party.

Tamaki was the clear favourite in the race. On 2 September, Jiji Press found overwhelming support for Tamaki among the Diet caucus. He was supported by 42 out of 61 members compared to just 12 for Tsumura. Tsumura hoped to perform well among local assembly officials due to contacts from his former role as director of the DP's Youth Bureau. On the day of the election, TBS reported that Tsumura would likely garner only around 15 votes from Diet members.

== Results ==
Candidate	Diet members			Party members & supporters			Local assembly members			Diet candidates			Total
Candidate	Votes	%	Points	Votes	%	Points	Votes	%	Points	Votes	%	Points	Total
Yuichiro Tamaki	41	69.5	82	17,793	76.5	55	407	72.2	51	16	88.9	16	204
Keisuke Tsumura	18	30.5	36	5,457	23.5	16	157	27.8	20	2	11.1	2	74
Total	59	100.0	118	23,250	100.0	71	564	100.0	71	18	100.0	18	278
Invalid	2			294			6			0			
Turnout	61	98.4		23,544	31.4		570	75.2		18	100.0		
Eligible	62			74,939			758			18			
Source: Democratic Party for the People
