= Keisuke Tsumura =

Japanese politician

- 津村 啓介
- Official portrait, 2010

Member of the House of Representatives
- In office 1 November 2024 – 23 January 2026
- Constituency: Chūgoku PR
- In office 9 November 2003 – 14 October 2021
- Constituency: Chūgoku PR (2003–2005); Okayama 2nd (2005–2012); Chūgoku PR (2012–2021)

Personal details
- Born: 27 October 1971 (age 54) Tsuyama, Okayama, Japan
- Party: CRA (since 2026)
- Other political affiliations: DPJ (2002–2016); DP (2016–2017); KnT (2017–2018); DPP (2018–2020); CDP (2020–2026)
- Education: University of Tokyo; Oxford University (Saïd Business School)
- Website: Official website

Keisuke Tsumura (津村 啓介, Tsumura Keisuke; born 26 October 1971) is a Japanese politician who served in the House of Representatives in the Diet (national legislature) as a member of the Constitutional Democratic Party (CDP).

== Early life ==
Tsumura is a native of Tsuyama, Okayama. He attended the University of Tokyo and received an MBA from Oxford University.

== Political career ==
He was elected for the first time in 2003.

Tsumura ran in the 2018 DPFP leadership election, being one of the two candidates beside Yuichiro Tamaki.
