= First Takaichi cabinet =

Cabinet of Japan from 2025 to 2026

- 104th Cabinet of Japan
- 21 October 2025 – 18 February 2026
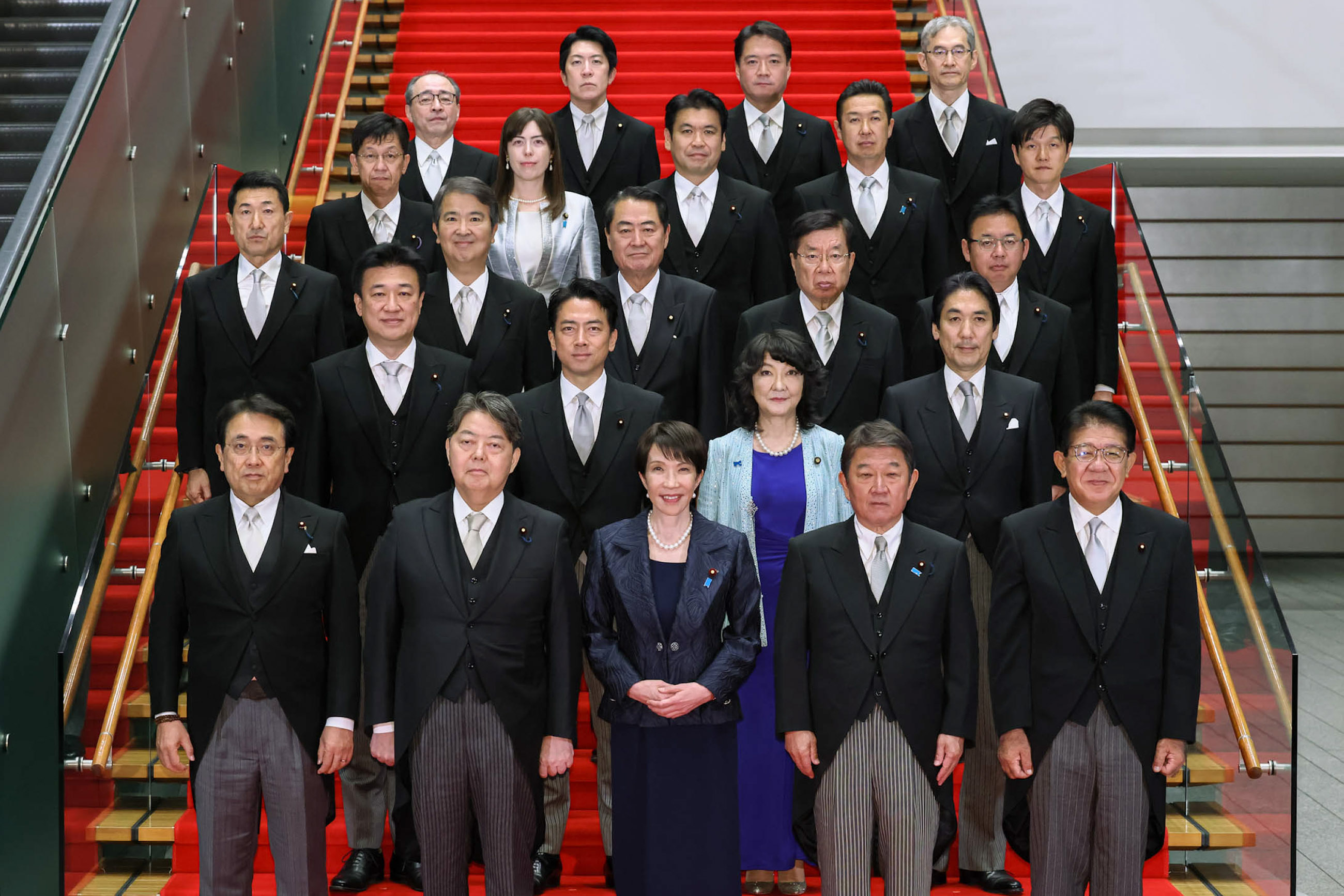
- Takaichi (front row, centre) with the elected cabinet inside the Kantei, 21 October 2025
- Date formed: 21 October 2025
- Date dissolved: 18 February 2026

People and organisations
- Emperor: Naruhito
- Prime Minister: Sanae Takaichi
- Prime Minister's history: Member of the HoR (1993–2003, 2005–present); Former Minister for Internal Affairs and Communications (2014–2017, 2019–2020)
- No. of ministers: 19
- Member party: Liberal Democratic Party Confidence and supply Japan Innovation Party
- Status in legislature: HoR (Lower): Minority coalition; HoC (Upper): Minority coalition
- Opposition cabinet: Noda Next Cabinet
- Opposition party: Constitutional Democratic Party; Democratic Party For the People; Komeito; Japanese Communist Party; Reiwa Shinsengumi; Social Democratic Party; Sanseitō; Conservative Party
- Opposition leader: Yoshihiko Noda, CDP (2025–2026); Junya Ogawa, CRA (since 2026)

History
- Incoming formation: 2025 LDP presidential election
- Legislature terms: 219th Session of the National Diet (HoR / HoC)
- Predecessor: Ishiba II
- Successor: Takaichi II

The First Takaichi cabinet was the 104th Cabinet of Japan, formed on 21 October 2025 when Sanae Takaichi was appointed Prime Minister by Emperor Naruhito as designated by the National Diet, following the resignation of Shigeru Ishiba after the 2025 Liberal Democratic Party presidential election.

The country's first woman-led government, it is also the first time that the Japan Innovation Party (JIP) will participate in the national government following the collapse of the LDP–Komeito coalition, which had governed from 1999 to 2009 and from 2012 to 2025, and the formation of the LDP–JIP coalition.

== Election of the Prime Minister ==
=== House of Representatives ===
21 October 2025 219th Special National Diet Absolute majority (233/465) required
House of Representatives
Choice	Party	Votes
Sanae Takaichi	Liberal Democratic Party	237 / 465
Yoshihiko Noda	Constitutional Democratic Party	149 / 465
Yuichiro Tamaki	Democratic Party For the People	28 / 465
Tetsuo Saito	Komeito	24 / 465
Taro Yamamoto	Reiwa Shinsengumi	9 / 465
Tomoko Tamura	Japanese Communist Party	8 / 465
Shuji Kira	Independent (Yūshi no Kai)	3 / 465
Sohei Kamiya	Sanseitō	3 / 465
Takashi Kawamura	Genzei Nippon	2 / 465
Naoki Hyakuta	Conservative Party of Japan	1 / 465
Jin Matsubara	Independent	1 / 465

=== House of Councillors ===
21 October 2025 219th Special National Diet Absolute majority (125/248) required
House of Councillors
Choice	Party	Votes	
Choice	Party	First Round	Run-Off
Sanae Takaichi	Liberal Democratic Party	123 / 248	125 / 248
Yoshihiko Noda	Constitutional Democratic Party	44 / 248	46 / 248
Yuichiro Tamaki	Democratic Party For the People	25 / 248	Eliminated
Tetsuo Saito	Komeito	21 / 248	Eliminated
Sohei Kamiya	Sanseitō	15 / 248	Eliminated
Tomoko Tamura	Japanese Communist Party	7 / 248	Eliminated
Taro Yamamoto	Reiwa Shinsengumi	6 / 248	Eliminated
Takahiro Anno	Team Mirai	2 / 248	Eliminated
Naoki Hyakuta	Conservative Party of Japan	1 / 248	Eliminated
Mizuho Fukushima	Social Democratic Party	1 / 248	Eliminated
Blank ballot		1 / 248	28 / 248
Invalid ballot			47 / 248

== Cabinet ==
Parties
Liberal Democratic
Japan Innovation

R	Member of the House of Representatives
C	Member of the House of Councillors
B	Bureaucrat

=== Ministers ===
Portfolio	Portrait	Minister		Took office	Left office	Note
Cabinet ministers
Prime Minister		Sanae Takaichi	R	21 October 2025	18 February 2026	
Minister for Internal Affairs and Communications		Yoshimasa Hayashi	R	21 October 2025	18 February 2026	
Minister of Justice		Hiroshi Hiraguchi	R	21 October 2025	18 February 2026	
Minister for Foreign Affairs		Toshimitsu Motegi	R	21 October 2025	18 February 2026	
Minister of Finance; Minister of State for Financial Services Minister in charge of Reviewing Special Measures Concerning Taxation and Subsidies		Satsuki Katayama	C	21 October 2025	18 February 2026	
Minister of Education, Culture, Sports, Science and Technology		Yohei Matsumoto	R	21 October 2025	18 February 2026	
Minister of Health, Labour and Welfare		Kenichiro Ueno	R	21 October 2025	18 February 2026	
Minister of Agriculture, Forestry and Fisheries		Norikazu Suzuki	R	21 October 2025	18 February 2026	
Minister of Economy, Trade and Industry Minister in charge of the Response to the Economic Impact Caused by the Nuclear Accident; Minister in charge of Green Transformation; Minister in charge of Industrial Competitiveness; Minister of State for the Nuclear Damage Compensation and Decommissioning Facilitation Corporation		Ryosei Akazawa	R	21 October 2025	18 February 2026	
Minister of Land, Infrastructure, Transport and Tourism Minister in charge of Water Cycle Policy; Minister in charge of the World Horticultural Exhibition Yokohama 2027		Yasushi Kaneko	R	21 October 2025	18 February 2026	
Minister of the Environment Minister of State for Nuclear Emergency Preparedness		Hirotaka Ishihara	R	21 October 2025	18 February 2026	
Minister of Defense		Shinjirō Koizumi	R	21 October 2025	18 February 2026	
Chief Cabinet Secretary; Minister in charge of Mitigating the Impact of U.S. Forces in Okinawa; Minister in charge of the Abduction Issue		Minoru Kihara	R	21 October 2025	18 February 2026	
Minister for Digital Transformation Minister in charge of Digital Administrative and Fiscal Reform; Minister in charge of Administrative Reform; Minister in charge of the National Civil Service System; Minister in charge of Cybersecurity; Minister in State for Cybersecurity		Hisashi Matsumoto	R	21 October 2025	18 February 2026	
Minister of Reconstruction Minister in charge of Comprehensive Policy Coordination for Revival from the Nuclear Accident at Fukushima; Minister in charge of the Preparation of Establishing the Disaster Management Agency; Minister in charge of Building National Resilience		Takao Makino	C	21 October 2025	18 February 2026	
Chairman of the National Public Safety Commission Minister in charge of Territorial Issues; Minister of State for Disaster Management; Minister of State for Ocean Policy		Jiro Akama	R	21 October 2025	18 February 2026	
Minister of State for Okinawa and Northern Territories Affairs; Minister of State for Consumer Affairs and Food Safety; Minister of State for Policies Related to Children, Declining Birthrate, Youth Empowerment, and Gender Equality; Minister of State for Regional Revitalization; Minister of State for Ainu-Related Policies; Minister of State for Promoting Cohesive and Mutual Assistance Society; Minister in charge of Women's Empowerment; Minister in charge of Cohesive Society; Minister in charge of Strategy for the Future of Regions		Hitoshi Kikawada	R	21 October 2025	18 February 2026	
Minister in charge of Japan's Growth Strategy Minister in charge of Developing an Environment for Wage Increases; Minister in charge of Startups; Minister in charge of Social Security Reform; Minister in charge of Infectious Disease Crisis Management; Minister of State for Economic and Fiscal Policy; Minister of State for Regulatory Reform		Minoru Kiuchi	R	21 October 2025	18 February 2026	
Minister in charge of Economic Security; Minister in charge of a Society of Well-Ordered and Harmonious Coexistence with Foreign Nationals; Minister of State for "Cool Japan" Strategy; Minister of State for Intellectual Property Strategy; Minister of State for Science and Technology Policy; Minister of State for Space Policy; Minister of State for AI Strategy; Minister of State for Economic Security		Kimi Onoda	C	21 October 2025	18 February 2026	

=== Deputy Chief Cabinet Secretary and Director-General of the Cabinet Legislation Bureau ===
Portfolio	Portrait	Name		Took office	Left office	Previous office
Deputy Chief Cabinet Secretary		Masanao Ozaki	R	21 October 2025	18 February 2026	
Deputy Chief Cabinet Secretary		Kei Satō	C	21 October 2025	18 February 2026	
Deputy Chief Cabinet Secretary		Yasuhiro Tsuyuki	B	21 October 2025	18 February 2026	Commissioner General of the National Police Agency
Director-General of the Cabinet Legislation Bureau		Nobuyuki Iwao	B	27 August 2024	18 February 2026	Public Prosecutors Office

=== Special Advisor to the Prime Minister ===
Portfolio	Adviser		Term	Note
Special Advisor to the Prime Minister	Sadamasa Oue	B	21 October 2025 – present	
Special Advisor to the Prime Minister	Takahiro Inoue	R	21 October 2025 – present	
Special advisor to the prime minister	Takashi Endo	R	21 October 2025 – present	
Special Advisor to the Prime Minister	Midori Matsushima	R	21 October 2025 – present	
Special advisor to the prime minister	Yoshimasa Uno	B	21 October 2025 – present	

=== State ministers ===
Portfolio	State minister		Took office	Left office	Concurrent post
State Minister for Digital Transformation	Soichiro Imaeda	R	22 October 2025	18 February 2026	State Minister of Cabinet Office
State Minister for Reconstruction	Yoshinori Tadokoro	R	22 October 2025	18 February 2026	
State Minister for Reconstruction	Takakazu Seto	R	22 October 2025	18 February 2026	State Minister of Cabinet Office
State Minister for Reconstruction	Yasuyuki Sakai	C	22 October 2025	18 February 2026	State Minister of Cabinet Office; State Minister of Land, Infrastructure, Transport and Tourism
State Minister of Cabinet Office	Soichiro Imaeda	R	22 October 2025	18 February 2026	State Minister for Digital Transformation
State Minister of Cabinet Office	Takakazu Seto	R	22 October 2025	18 February 2026	State Minister for Reconstruction
State Minister of Cabinet Office	Kazuchika Iwata	R	22 October 2025	18 February 2026	
State Minister of Cabinet Office	Hayato Suzuki	R	22 October 2025	18 February 2026	
State Minister of Cabinet Office	Jun Tsushima	R	22 October 2025	18 February 2026	
State Minister of Cabinet Office	Toshiro Ino	R	22 October 2025	18 February 2026	State Minister of Economy, Trade and Industry
State Minister of Cabinet Office	Kenji Yamada	R	22 October 2025	18 February 2026	State Minister of Economy, Trade and Industry
State Minister of Cabinet Office	Yasuyuki Sakai	C	22 October 2025	18 February 2026	State Minister for Reconstruction; State Minister of Land, Infrastructure, Transport and Tourism
State Minister of Cabinet Office	Kiyoto Tsuji	R	22 October 2025	18 February 2026	State Minister of the Environment
State Minister of Cabinet Office	Masahisa Miyazaki	R	22 October 2025	18 February 2026	State Minister of Defense
State Minister for Internal Affairs and Communications	Noriko Horiuchi	R	22 October 2025	18 February 2026	
State Minister for Internal Affairs and Communications	Katsunori Takahashi	C	22 October 2025	18 February 2026	
State Minister of Justice	Hidehiro Mitani	R	22 October 2025	18 February 2026	
State Minister for Foreign Affairs	Ayano Kunimitsu	R	22 October 2025	18 February 2026	
State Minister for Foreign Affairs	Iwao Horii	C	22 October 2025	18 February 2026	
State Minister of Finance	Shinichi Nakatani	R	22 October 2025	18 February 2026	
State Minister of Finance	Shōji Maitachi	C	22 October 2025	18 February 2026	
State Minister of Education, Culture, Sports, Science and Technology	Shigeki Kobayashi	R	22 October 2025	18 February 2026	
State Minister of Education, Culture, Sports, Science and Technology	Hiroyuki Nakamura	R	22 October 2025	18 February 2026	
State Minister of Health, Labour and Welfare	Yasumasa Nagasaka	R	22 October 2025	18 February 2026	
State Minister of Health, Labour and Welfare	Hirobumi Niki	R	22 October 2025	18 February 2026	
State Minister of Agriculture, Forestry and Fisheries	Yukinori Nemoto	R	22 October 2025	18 February 2026	
State Minister of Agriculture, Forestry and Fisheries	Yūhei Yamashita	C	22 October 2025	18 February 2026	
State Minister of Economy, Trade and Industry	Toshiro Ino	R	22 October 2025	18 February 2026	State Minister of Cabinet Office
State Minister of Economy, Trade and Industry	Kenji Yamada	R	22 October 2025	18 February 2026	State Minister of Cabinet Office
State Minister of Land, Infrastructure, Transport and Tourism	Hajime Sasaki	R	22 October 2025	18 February 2026	
State Minister of Land, Infrastructure, Transport and Tourism	Yasuyuki Sakai	C	22 October 2025	18 February 2026	State Minister for Reconstruction; State Minister of Cabinet Office
State Minister of the Environment	Kiyoto Tsuji	R	22 October 2025	18 February 2026	State Minister of Cabinet Office
State Minister of the Environment	Shigeharu Aoyama	C	22 October 2025	18 February 2026	
State Minister of Defense	Masahisa Miyazaki	R	22 October 2025	18 February 2026	State Minister of Cabinet Office

=== Parliamentary vice-ministers ===
Inaugurated on 22 October 2025

Portfolio	Parliamentary Vice-Minister		Took office	Left office	Concurrent post
Parliamentary Vice-Minister for Digital Transformation	Hideto Kawasaki	R	22 October 2025	18 February 2026	Parliamentary Vice-Minister of Cabinet Office
Parliamentary Vice-Minister for Reconstruction	Naoki Furukawa	R	22 October 2025	18 February 2026	Parliamentary Vice-Minister of Cabinet Office
Parliamentary Vice-Minister for Reconstruction	Masato Shimizu	C	22 October 2025	18 February 2026	Parliamentary Vice-Minister for Education, Culture, Sports, Science and Technology
Parliamentary Vice-Minister for Reconstruction	Takuo Komori	R	22 October 2025	18 February 2026	Parliamentary Vice-Minister of Economy, Trade and Industry; Parliamentary Vice-Minister of Cabinet Office
Parliamentary Vice-Minister for Reconstruction	Eishun Ueda	R	22 October 2025	18 February 2026	Parliamentary Vice-Minister of Land, Infrastructure, Transport and Tourism; Parliamentary Vice-Minister of Cabinet Office
Parliamentary Vice-Minister of Cabinet Office	Hideto Kawasaki	R	22 October 2025	18 February 2026	Parliamentary Vice-Minister for Digital Transformation
Parliamentary Vice-Minister of Cabinet Office	Yozo Kaneko	R	22 October 2025	18 February 2026	
Parliamentary Vice-Minister of Cabinet Office	Shinji Wakayama	R	22 October 2025	18 February 2026	
Parliamentary Vice-Minister of Cabinet Office	Naoki Furukawa	R	22 October 2025	18 February 2026	Parliamentary Vice-Minister for Reconstruction
Parliamentary Vice-Minister of Cabinet Office	Toshiyuki Ochi	C	22 October 2025	18 February 2026	Parliamentary Vice-Minister of Economy, Trade and Industry
Parliamentary Vice-Minister of Cabinet Office	Takuo Komori	R	22 October 2025	18 February 2026	Parliamentary Vice-Minister of Economy, Trade and Industry; Parliamentary Vice-Minister for Reconstruction
Parliamentary Vice-Minister of Cabinet Office	Eishun Ueda	R	22 October 2025	18 February 2026	Parliamentary Vice-Minister of Land, Infrastructure, Transport and Tourism; Parliamentary Vice-Minister for Reconstruction
Parliamentary Vice-Minister of Cabinet Office	Rio Tomonō	C	22 October 2025	18 February 2026	Parliamentary Vice-Minister of the Environment
Parliamentary Vice-Minister of Cabinet Office	Shinji Yoshida	R	22 October 2025	18 February 2026	Parliamentary Vice-Minister of Defense
Parliamentary Vice-Minister for Internal Affairs and Communications	Hideyuki Nakano	R	22 October 2025	18 February 2026	
Parliamentary Vice-Minister for Internal Affairs and Communications	Jun Mukōyama	R	22 October 2025	18 February 2026	
Parliamentary Vice-Minister for Internal Affairs and Communications	Daisuke Kajihara	C	22 October 2025	18 February 2026	
Parliamentary Vice-Minister of Justice	Mamoru Fukuyama	C	22 October 2025	18 February 2026	
Parliamentary Vice-Minister for Foreign Affairs	Arfiya Eri	R	22 October 2025	18 February 2026	
Parliamentary Vice-Minister for Foreign Affairs	Yohei Onishi	R	22 October 2025	18 February 2026	
Parliamentary Vice-Minister for Foreign Affairs	Tomoaki Shimada	R	22 October 2025	18 February 2026	
Parliamentary Vice-Minister of Finance	Satoshi Mitazono	R	22 October 2025	18 February 2026	
Parliamentary Vice-Minister of Finance	Harumi Takahashi	C	22 October 2025	18 February 2026	
Parliamentary Vice-Minister of Education, Culture, Sports, Science and Technology	Kaoru Fukuda	R	22 October 2025	18 February 2026	
Parliamentary Vice-Minister of Education, Culture, Sports, Science and Technology	Masato Shimizu	C	22 October 2025	18 February 2026	Parliamentary Vice-Minister for Reconstruction
Parliamentary Vice-Minister of Health, Labour and Welfare	Wataru Kurihara	R	22 October 2025	18 February 2026	
Parliamentary Vice-Minister of Health, Labour and Welfare	Masayuki Kamiya	C	22 October 2025	18 February 2026	
Parliamentary Vice-Minister for Agriculture, Forestry and Fisheries	Ken Hirose	R	22 October 2025	18 February 2026	
Parliamentary Vice-Minister for Agriculture, Forestry and Fisheries	Keisuke Yamamoto	C	22 October 2025	18 February 2026	
Parliamentary Vice-Minister of Economy, Trade and Industry	Toshiyuki Ochi	C	22 October 2025	18 February 2026	Parliamentary Vice-Minister of Cabinet Office
Parliamentary Vice-Minister of Economy, Trade and Industry	Takuo Komori	R	22 October 2025	18 February 2026	Parliamentary Vice-Minister for Reconstruction; Parliamentary Vice-Minister of Cabinet Office
Parliamentary Vice-Minister of Land, Infrastructure, Transport and Tourism	Ryusho Kato	R	22 October 2025	18 February 2026	
Parliamentary Vice-Minister of Land, Infrastructure, Transport and Tourism	Manabu Nagai	C	22 October 2025	18 February 2026	
Parliamentary Vice-Minister of Land, Infrastructure, Transport and Tourism	Eishun Ueda	R	22 October 2025	18 February 2026	Parliamentary Vice-Minister for Reconstruction; Parliamentary Vice-Minister of Cabinet Office
Parliamentary Vice-Minister of the Environment	Chisato Morishita	R	22 October 2025	18 February 2026	
Parliamentary Vice-Minister of the Environment	Rio Tomonō	C	22 October 2025	18 February 2026	Parliamentary Vice-Minister of Cabinet Office
Parliamentary Vice-Minister of Defense	Shinji Yoshida	R	22 October 2025	18 February 2026	Parliamentary Vice-Minister of Cabinet Office
Parliamentary Vice-Minister of Defense	Yohei Wakabayashi	C	22 October 2025	18 February 2026	

Preceded by Second Ishiba cabinet	Cabinet of Japan; 2025–2026	Succeeded by Second Takaichi cabinet
