= Misako Yasui =

Japanese politician

- 安井 美沙子

Member of the House of Councillors
- In office 26 July 2010 – 25 July 2016
- Preceded by: Yoshitake Kimata
- Succeeded by: Ryūji Satomi
- Constituency: Aichi at-large

Personal details
- Born: 11 September 1965 (age 61) Minato, Tokyo, Japan
- Party: Independent (2018–2020; 2021–present)
- Other political affiliations: DPJ (2010–2016); DP (2016–2017); KnT (2017–2018); RS (2020–2021)
- Education: Sophia University; New York University; Hitotsubashi University

Misako Yasui (安井 美沙子, Yasui Misako; born September 11, 1965) is a former legislator in the National Diet of Japan, holding a seat in the House of Councillors of Japan from 2010 to 2016. She is a member of the Democratic Party of Japan (DPJ), serving as a representative of Aichi Prefecture.

== Early life and education ==
Once completing her studies at New York University, Ms. Yasui joined McKinsey & Company in Tokyo, serving as a business analyst. She formulated corporate strategies in the areas of marketing, product development, sales strategies and organization restructuring. She then joined Misumi Group Inc. and led a team that launched a new food service business entity､that became a model for others.

Yasui then became an independent consultant helping corporations and local governments. At that time, she worked as an advisor for "the Office of City Management Reform" of the City of Osaka and then as a Special Advisor for Osaka Prefectural Government. She first collaborated with Toru Hashimoto, the former governor of Osaka and the current mayor of Osaka. Yasui became determined to follow Hashimoto into politics.

She started a master's degree program at Hitotsubashi University's School of International and Public Policy, interrupting her studies to run for office. She completed the program in 2012.

== Political career ==
On March 9, 2010, Yasui was nominated as an official candidate of the Democratic Party of Japan. At the 22nd Upper House Election in July, she won with 676,681 votes, 21.1% of the total votes cast in Aichi prefecture.

She joined the House of Councillors on July 26, 2010. In the Diet, she has served on committees including Economy and Industry, Audit, Research on Deflation-Ending Measures and the Special Committee on Official Development Assistance and Relation Matters. In the DPJ, Yasui held positions of Vice Director-General and as Vice Chair of the Diet Affairs Committee of the DPJ Caucus of the House of Councillors.

She is a member of the Kokujiku group, led by Rep. Akihisa Nagashima.

== Political positions ==
=== Business and Economy ===
Yasui supports small businesses. ("Unless small businesses are sustained in Japan, where 99.7% of companies are small businesses, Japan's economy will not be reenergized.)") She is critical of "Abenomics" lack of support for small businesses and in contrast lauds the success her party, the DPJ, has had in fighting to increase tax allowances for the expenses small businesses are burdened with as part of the 2013 Tax Revision.

=== Food Security ===
Revising the role of "Japan Agricultural Cooperatives"for the purpose of sustainability and productivity alongside deepening consumer understanding is a focal point of her platform.

=== Energy ===
In the wake of Fukushima Daiichi nuclear disastert, Yasui reiterated the need for a safe and sustainable energy infrastructure in Japan.
