= Kuniko Tanioka =

Japanese politician (born 1954)

- 谷岡 郁子
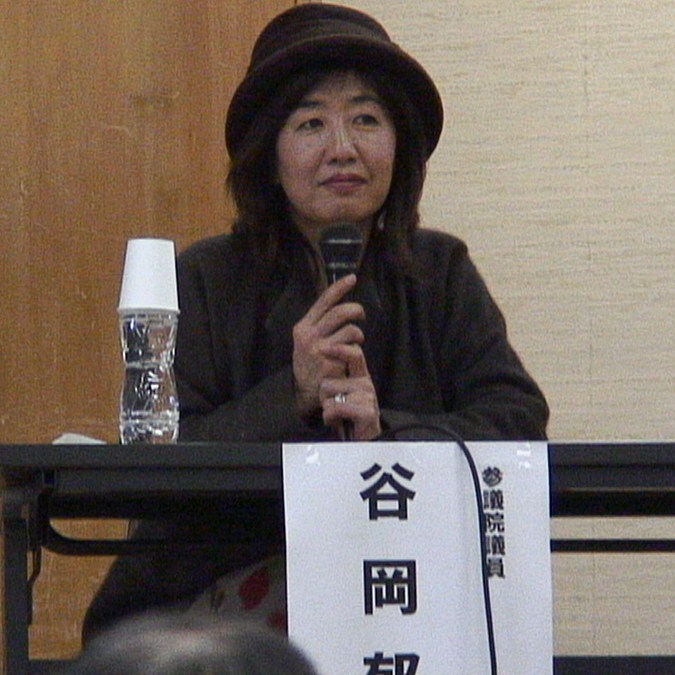
- Tanioka in 2008

Member of the House of Councillors
- In office 29 July 2007 – 25 July 2013
- Preceded by: Tamotsu Yamamoto
- Succeeded by: Michiyo Yakushiji
- Constituency: Aichi at-large

Personal details
- Born: 1 May 1954 (age 72) Abeno, Osaka, Japan
- Party: Green Wind (2012–2013)
- Other political affiliations: Democratic (2007–2012)
- Education: Kobe Design University

Kuniko Tanioka (谷岡 郁子, Tanioka Kuniko; born 1954) is a Japanese politician of the Democratic Party of Japan, a member of the House of Councillors in the Diet (national legislature). A native of Osaka Prefecture, she graduated from the University of Toronto in Ontario, Canada and gained a bachelor's degree in developmental biology. She was elected to the House of Councillors for the first time in 2007. She is president of Shigakkan University.

== Notes ==
House of Councillors
Preceded by Seiji Suzuki; Kōhei Ōtsuka; Tamotsu Yamamoto	Councillor for Aichi; 2007–present Served alongside: Kōhei Ōtsuka, Seiji Suzuki	Incumbent
