= Seiji Suzuki =

Japanese politician

- 鈴木 政二
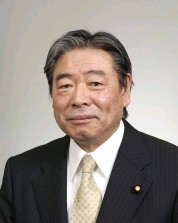
- Official portrait, 2005

Deputy Chief Cabinet Secretary (Political affairs, House of Councillors)
- In office 31 October 2005 – 27 August 2007
- Prime Minister: Junichiro Koizumi; Shinzo Abe
- Preceded by: Masaaki Yamazaki
- Succeeded by: Mitsuhide Iwaki

Member of the House of Councillors
- In office 23 July 1995 – 28 July 2013
- Preceded by: Hiroshi Yoshikawa
- Succeeded by: Yasuyuki Sakai
- Constituency: Aichi at-large

Member of the Aichi Prefectural Assembly
- In office 30 April 1979 – 29 April 1995
- Constituency: Chiryū City

Member of the Chiryū City Council
- In office 1974–1975

Personal details
- Born: 6 June 1948 (age 78) Hekikai, Aichi, Japan
- Party: Liberal Democratic
- Education: Nihon University

Seiji Suzuki (鈴木 政二, Suzuki Seiji; born June 6, 1948) is a Japanese politician of the Liberal Democratic Party, and a member of the House of Councillors in the Diet (national legislature).

== Early life ==
Suzuki is a native of Chiryū, Aichi and a graduate of Nihon University.

== Political career ==
Suzuki was elected to the House of Councillors for the first time in 1995 after serving in the city assembly of Chiryū for one term from 1974, and then serving in the Aichi Prefectural Assembly for 4 terms from 1979 to 1995.

Suzuki served three 6-year terms in the House of Councillors, and decided to retire at the end of his third term in 2013 rather than contesting the 2013 election.

== Cabinet positions ==
Suzuki served as Deputy Secretary of the Cabinet Office from October 2005 to August 2007 under prime ministers Koizumi and Abe.

== Honours ==
- Grand Cordon of the Order of the Rising Sun (2018)

Political offices
Preceded by Masaaki Yamazaki	Deputy Chief Cabinet Secretary (parliamentary, House of Councillors); 2005–2007	Succeeded by Mitsuhide Iwaki
House of Councillors
Preceded by Sachiko Maehata; Hiroshi Yoshikawa; Kei Inoue	Councillor for Aichi; 1995–present Served alongside: Tamotsu Yamamoto, Makiko Suehiro, Kōhei Ōtsuka, Kuniko Tanioka	Incumbent
