= Yoshitake =

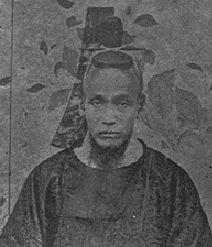
- Yoshitake Shima (1822–1874), Japanese samurai
- Pronunciation: joɕitake (IPA)
- Gender: Male

Origin
- Origin: Japanese
- Meaning: Different meanings depending on the kanji used

Other names
- Alternative spelling: Yositake (Kunrei-shiki) Yositake (Nihon-shiki) Yoshitake (Hepburn)

Yoshitake is a masculine Japanese given name and a Japanese surname.

== Written forms ==
Yoshitake can be written using many different combinations of kanji characters. Here are some examples:

- 義勇, "justice, brave"
- 義武, "justice, warrior"
- 義健, "justice, healthy"
- 義猛, "justice, furious"
- 義毅, "justice, strong"
- 吉武, "good luck, warrior"
- 吉健, "good luck, healthy"
- 吉猛, "good luck, furious"
- 吉毅, "good luck, strong"
- 善武, "virtuous, warrior"
- 善健, "virtuous, healthy"
- 善猛, "virtuous, furious"
- 善毅, "virtuous, strong"
- 芳武, "fragrant/virtuous, warrior"
- 芳健, "fragrant/virtuous, healthy"
- 芳猛, "fragrant/virtuous, furious"
- 芳毅, "fragrant/virtuous, strong"
- 好健, "good/like something, healthy"
- 喜健, "rejoice, healthy"
- 喜丈, "rejoice, measure of length"
- 慶健, "congratulate, healthy"
- 由武, "reason, warrior"
- 由健, "reason, healthy"

The name can also be written in hiragana よしたけ or katakana ヨシタケ.

== Notable people with the given name ==
- Yoshitake Iida (飯田 義武; ????–1592), Japanese samurai
- Yoshitake Kimata (木俣 佳丈; born 1965), Japanese politician
- Yoshitake Masuhara (増原 義剛; born 1945), Japanese politician
- Yoshitake Shima (島 義勇; 1822–1874), Japanese samurai
- Yoshitake Suzuki (鈴木 喜丈; born 1998), Japanese footballer

== Notable people with the surname ==
- Chihaya Yoshitake (吉武 千颯; born 1999), Japanese singer
- Tsuyoshi Yoshitake (吉武 剛; born 1981), Japanese footballer
