= Kiyohiro Araki =

Japanese politician

- 荒木 清寛
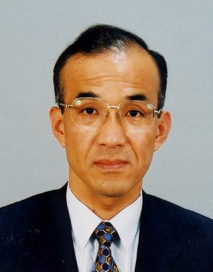
- Official portrait, 2001

Member of the House of Councillors
- In office 26 July 1992 – 25 July 2016
- Preceded by: Yoshihisa Ōshima
- Succeeded by: Multi-member district
- Constituency: Aichi at-large (1992–1998); National PR (1998–2016)

Personal details
- Born: 1 June 1956 (age 70) Ena, Gifu, Japan
- Party: Komeito
- Other political affiliations: CGP (1992–1998)
- Education: Sōka University

Kiyohiro Araki (荒木 清寛, Araki Kiyohiro; born June 1, 1956) is a Japanese politician of the New Komeito Party, a member of the House of Councillors in the Diet (national legislature). A native of Ena, Gifu and graduate of Soka University, he was elected for the first time in 1992.

Political offices
New title	Senior Vice Minister for Foreign Affairs; January 2001–May 2001; Served alongside: Seishirō Etō	Succeeded by Shigeo Uetake; Seiken Sugiura
House of Councillors
Preceded by Hiroshi Ōgi; Yoshihisa Ōshima; Shigenobu Sanji	Councillor for Aichi (class of 1950/1956/...); 1992–1998; Served alongside: Hiroshi Ōgi, Shōji Shinma, Yuzuru Tsutsugi	Succeeded by Yoshitake Kimata; Taisuke Satō; Hiroko Hatta
Preceded by N/A	Councillor by proportional representation (class of 1950/1956/...); 1998–present	Incumbent
