= Akihisa Nagashima =

Japanese politician

- 長島 昭久
- Official portrait, 2024

Special Advisor to the Prime Minister
- In office 1 October 2024 – 21 October 2025; Serving with Masafumi Mori, Wakako Yata
- Prime Minister: Shigeru Ishiba
- Preceded by: Hirotaka Ishihara; Yasuhiro Ozato
- Succeeded by: Midori Matsushima; Takashi Endo; Takahiro Inoue; Yoshimasa Uno; Sadamasa Oue
- In office 5 September 2011 – 1 October 2012; Serving with Hiranao Honda, Shunichi Mizuoka, Yoshinori Suematsu, Yoshio Tezuka
- Prime Minister: Yoshihiko Noda
- Preceded by: Hirohisa Fujii; Hirokazu Shiba; Kiyomi Tsujimoto; Renhō; Shizuka Kamei
- Succeeded by: Mitsuo Mitani; Hiroshi Ogushi; Keiro Kitagami; Yoshihiro Kawakami

State Minister of Defense
- In office 2 October 2012 – 26 December 2012
- Prime Minister: Yoshihiko Noda
- Preceded by: Shu Watanabe
- Succeeded by: Akinori Eto

Parliamentary Vice-Minister of Defense
- In office 18 September 2009 – 17 September 2010; Serving with Daizo Kusuda
- Prime Minister: Yukio Hatoyama; Naoto Kan
- Preceded by: Nobuo Kishi; Ryota Takeda
- Succeeded by: Daisuke Matsumoto; Hajime Hirota

Member of the House of Representatives; from Tokyo
- Incumbent
- Assumed office 9 November 2003
- Preceded by: Etsuko Kawada
- Constituency: See list: 21st district (2003–2005); PR block (2005–2009); 21st district (2009–2014); PR block (2014–2017); 21st district (2017–2021); PR block (2021–2026); 30th district (2026–present)

Personal details
- Born: 17 February 1962 (age 64) Yokohama, Kanagawa, Japan
- Party: LDP (since 2019)
- Other political affiliations: DPJ (2000–2016); DP (2016–2017); KnT (2017–2018); Independent (2018–2019)
- Education: Keio University; Johns Hopkins University
- Website: Official Website; Weblog

Akihisa Nagashima (長島 昭久, Nagashima Akihisa) is a member of the House of Representatives of Japan as well as a visiting professor at Chuo University's Graduate School of Public Studies. He served as the Parliamentary Vice Minister of Defense in the Kan Cabinet.

== Early life and education ==
Nagashima was born on 17 February 1962, in Yokohama-City, Kanagawa Prefecture, Japan.

Nagashima received his B.A. in Law in 1984, his B.A. in Government in 1986, and his Master of Laws (LL.M) from Keio University in 1988. He received his M.A. from the Johns Hopkins University School of Advanced International Studies (SAIS) in 1997.

From 1993 to 1995, Nagashima was a visiting scholar at Vanderbilt University, Nashville, Tennessee, before becoming a research associate in Asian Security Studies in 1997, and an Adjunct Senior Fellow in Asia Studies at the Council on Foreign Relations, Washington, D.C., in 1999. From 2000 to 2001, he was a visiting scholar at the Edwin O. Reischauer Center for East Asian Studies at the Johns Hopkins University School of Advanced International Studies (SAIS), Washington, D.C. After coming back to Japan, he taught as a lecturer at Keio University's Graduate School of Law from 2003 to 2007.

== Political career ==
Nagashima started his political career with the Democratic Party of Japan (DPJ). During his time as an opposition legislator at the National Diet of Japan, he has served as the Senior Director of the Committee on National Security, Director of the Committee on Foreign Affairs, Special Committee on North Korean Abductions and Other Issues, as well as a member of the Committee on Education, Sports, Science and Technology, the Special Committee on Iraq and Terrorism and the Special Committee on Responses of Armed Attacks. From 2003 to 2004, he served as the Deputy Director-General of the Cultural and Organizations Department of the DPJ, as well as the Next Vice-Minister of Defense before becoming the Next Minister of Defense from 2005 to 2006. Later he has served as the Vice-Chair of the Diet Affairs Committee, the Policy Research Committee, and Deputy Secretary General of the DPJ.

Nagashima left the DP in April 2017 due to a disagreement with the party's cooperation with the JCP. Prior to the 2017 general election, he participated in the foundation of the Party of Hope. When Hope merged with the Democratic Party in May 2018 to form the Democratic Party for the People, Nagashima decided not to join the new party and became an independent member instead. In June 2019 he joined the LDP.

Formerly affiliated to the openly negationist lobby Nippon Kaigi, Nagashima contributed, with Yoshiko Sakurai, Eriko Sanya, and Masahiro Akiyama, to a forum on the Constitution about security, independence, and Article 9 in their journal in July 2009. In September 2015, Nagashima announced his withdrawal from Nippon Kaigi.

== Political positions ==
In a joint letter initiated by Norbert Röttgen and Anthony Gonzalez ahead of the 47th G7 summit in 2021, Nagashima joined some 70 legislators from Europe and the US in calling upon their leaders to take a tough stance on China and to "avoid becoming dependent" on the country for technology including artificial intelligence and 5G.
