= Takashi Endo =

Japanese politician (born 1968)

- 遠藤 敬
- Official portrait, 2025

Special Advisor to the Prime Minister (in charge of Promoting Coalition Agreement Policies)
- Incumbent
- Assumed office 21 October 2025 Serving with Midori Matsushima, Takahiro Inoue, Yoshimasa Uno, Sadamasa Oue
- Prime Minister: Sanae Takaichi
- Preceded by: Akihisa Nagashima; Masafumi Mori; Wakako Yata

Member of the House of Representatives
- Incumbent
- Assumed office 17 December 2012
- Preceded by: Osamu Nakagawa
- Constituency: Osaka 18th

Personal details
- Born: 6 June 1968 (age 58) Takaishi, Osaka, Japan
- Party: Ishin (since 2015)
- Other political affiliations: LDP (2011–2012); JRP (2012–2014); JIP (2014–2015)

Takashi Endo (遠藤敬, Endo Takashi; born 6 June 1968) is a Japanese politician serving as a member of the House of Representatives since 2012. He has served as Chairman of the National Security Committee since 2024.
