= Yoshitake Kimata =

Japanese politician

- 木俣 佳丈
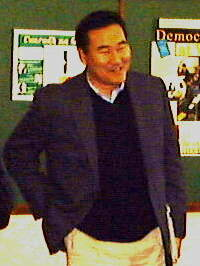
- Kimata in 2005

Member of the House of Councillors
- In office 26 July 1998 – 25 July 2010
- Preceded by: Kiyohiro Araki
- Succeeded by: Misako Yasui
- Constituency: Aichi at-large

Personal details
- Born: 19 February 1965 (age 61) Toyohashi, Aichi, Japan
- Party: Democratic
- Other political affiliations: New Frontier (1994–1998); New Fraternity (1998)
- Education: Hitotsubashi University

Yoshitake Kimata (木俣 佳丈, Kimata Yoshitake; born February 19, 1965) is a former Japanese politician of the Democratic Party of Japan and a member of the House of Councillors in the Diet (national legislature). He represented the Aichi at-large district. A native of Toyohashi, Aichi and a graduate of Hitotsubashi University and the George Washington University School of Public Policy and Public Administration, he ran unsuccessfully for the House of Representatives in 1996. In 1998 he ran for the House of Councillors and was elected for the first time.
