= Maiko Tajima =

Japanese politician

- 田島 麻衣子
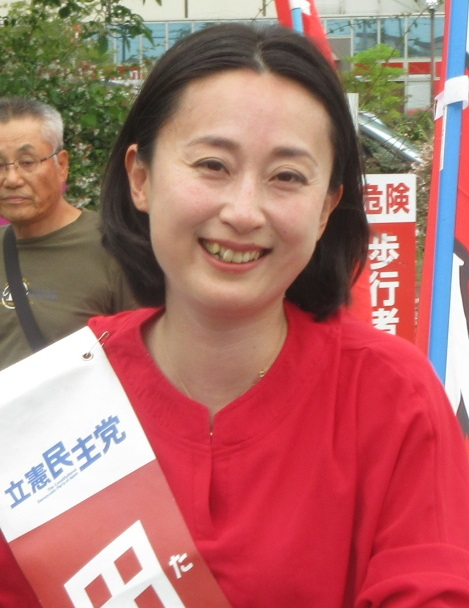
- Tajima in 2019

Member of the House of Councillors
- Incumbent
- Assumed office 29 July 2019
- Preceded by: Michiyo Yakushiji
- Constituency: Aichi at-large

Personal details
- Born: 20 December 1976 (age 49) Ōta, Tokyo, Japan
- Party: Constitutional Democratic
- Education: Aoyama Gakuin University; University of Oxford

Maiko Tajima is a Japanese politician who is a member of the House of Councillors of Japan.

== Career ==
She attended Aoyama Gakuin University, and Oxford University. In 2006, she worked for United Nations World Food Programme and was elected in 2019 to the House of Councillors.
