= Ryūji Satomi =

Japanese politician

- 里見 隆治
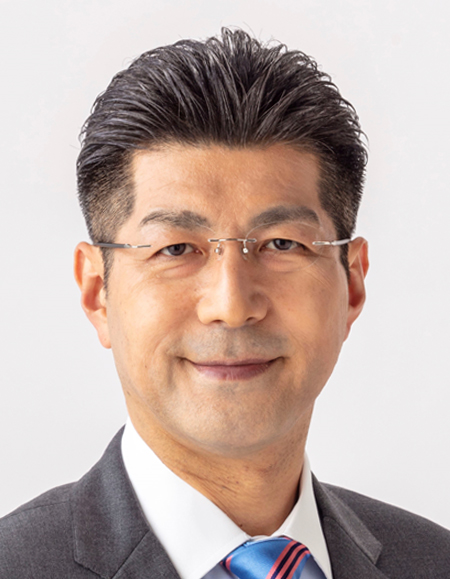
- Official portrait, 2022

Member of the House of Councillors
- Incumbent
- Assumed office 26 July 2016
- Preceded by: Misako Yasui
- Constituency: Aichi at-large

Personal details
- Born: 17 October 1967 (age 58) Osaka, Japan
- Party: Komeito
- Education: University of Tokyo
- Occupation: Economist

Ryūji Satomi is a Japanese politician who is a member of the House of Councillors of Japan.

== Career ==
He graduated from the University of Tokyo and worked in the Ministry of Labor.
