= Masahito Fujikawa =

Japanese politician

- 藤川 政人
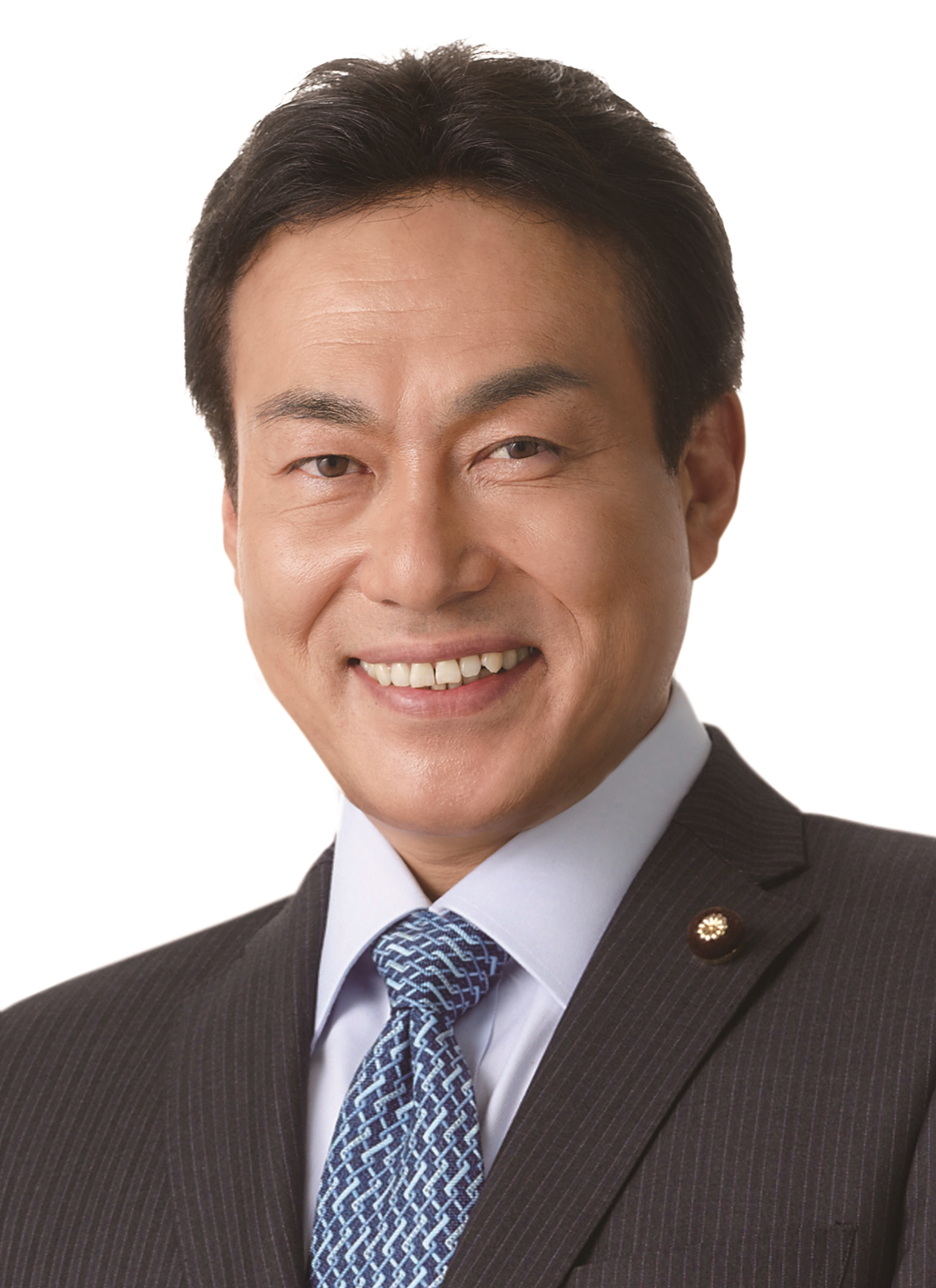
- Official portrait, 2017

Member of the House of Councillors
- Incumbent
- Assumed office 26 July 2010
- Preceded by: Katsuhito Asano
- Constituency: Aichi at-large

Member of the Aichi Prefectural Assembly
- In office 30 April 1999 – 16 June 2010
- Constituency: Niwa District

Personal details
- Born: 8 July 1960 (age 66) Fusō, Aichi, Japan
- Party: Liberal Democratic
- Education: Nanzan University

Masahito Fujikawa is a Japanese politician who is a member of the House of Councillors of Japan.

== Biography ==
He was born in 1960 and graduated from Nanzan University in 1983, and worked for a Board of Education. In 1999, he was elected to the Aichi Prefectural Assembly for 3 terms. In 2010, he was elected to the House of Councillors in 2010, and re-elected in 2016 and 2022.
