= Yoshitaka Saitō =

Japanese politician

- 斎藤 嘉隆
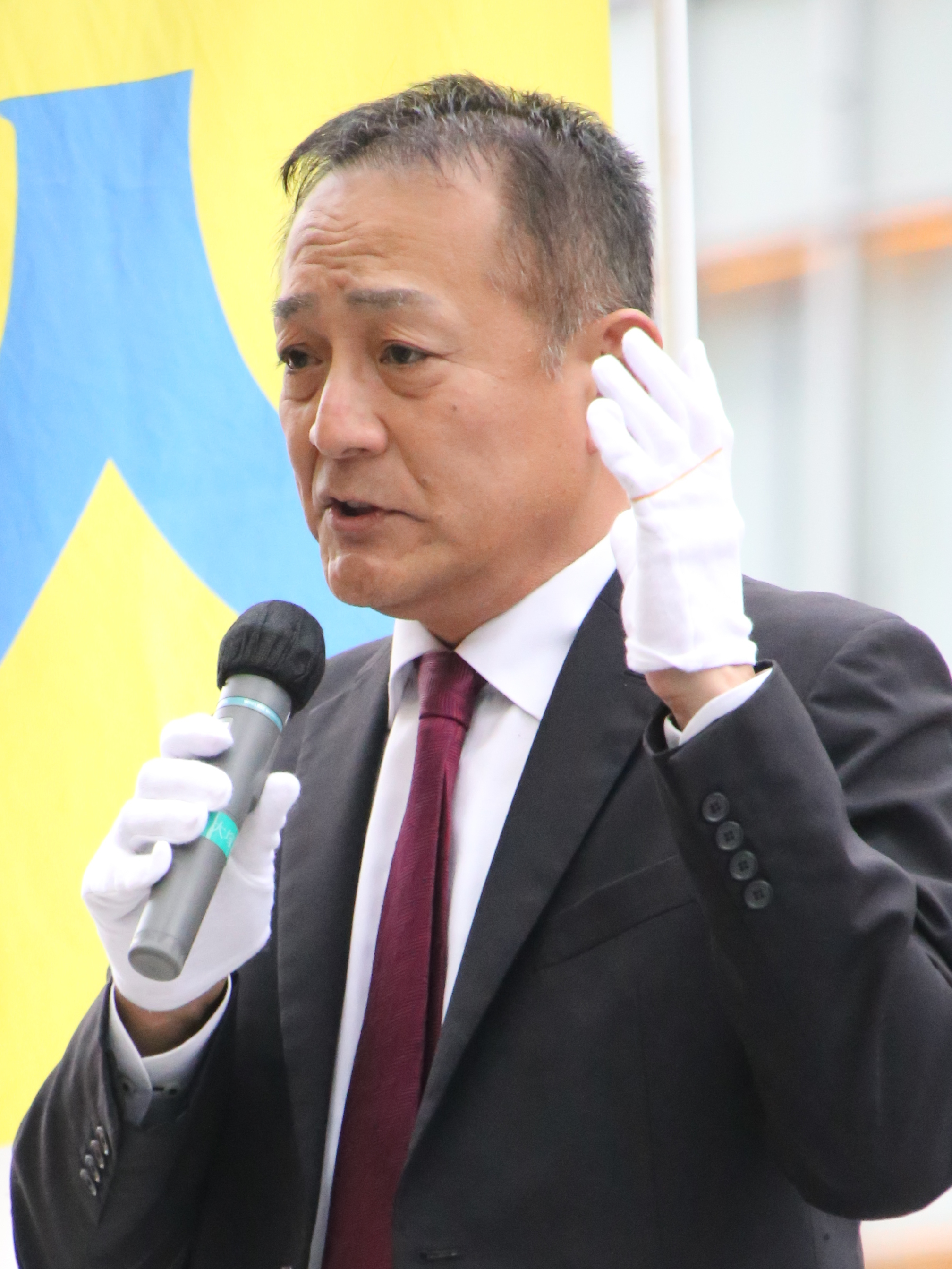
- Saitō in 2024

Member of the House of Councillors
- Incumbent
- Assumed office 26 July 2010
- Preceded by: Taisuke Sato
- Constituency: Aichi at-large

Personal details
- Born: 18 February 1963 (age 63) Nakamura, Nagoya, Japan
- Party: CDP (since 2018)
- Other political affiliations: DPJ (2010–2016); DP (2016–2017); Independent (2017–2018)
- Education: Aichi University of Education

Yoshitaka Saitō (born February 18, 1963, in Aichi Prefecture, Japan) is a Japanese politician who has served as a member of the House of Councillors of Japan since 2010. He represents the Aichi at-large district and is a member of the Democratic Party of Japan.

== Early life ==
Saito was born Nagoya city, in the ward of Nakamura. He graduated from Nagoya Municipal Kikuzato High School in 1981, and graduated from the Aichi University of Education in 1985. He was an elementary school teacher prior to his election to the House of Councillors.
