= Kohei Otsuka =

Japanese politician (1959–2026)

- 大塚 耕平
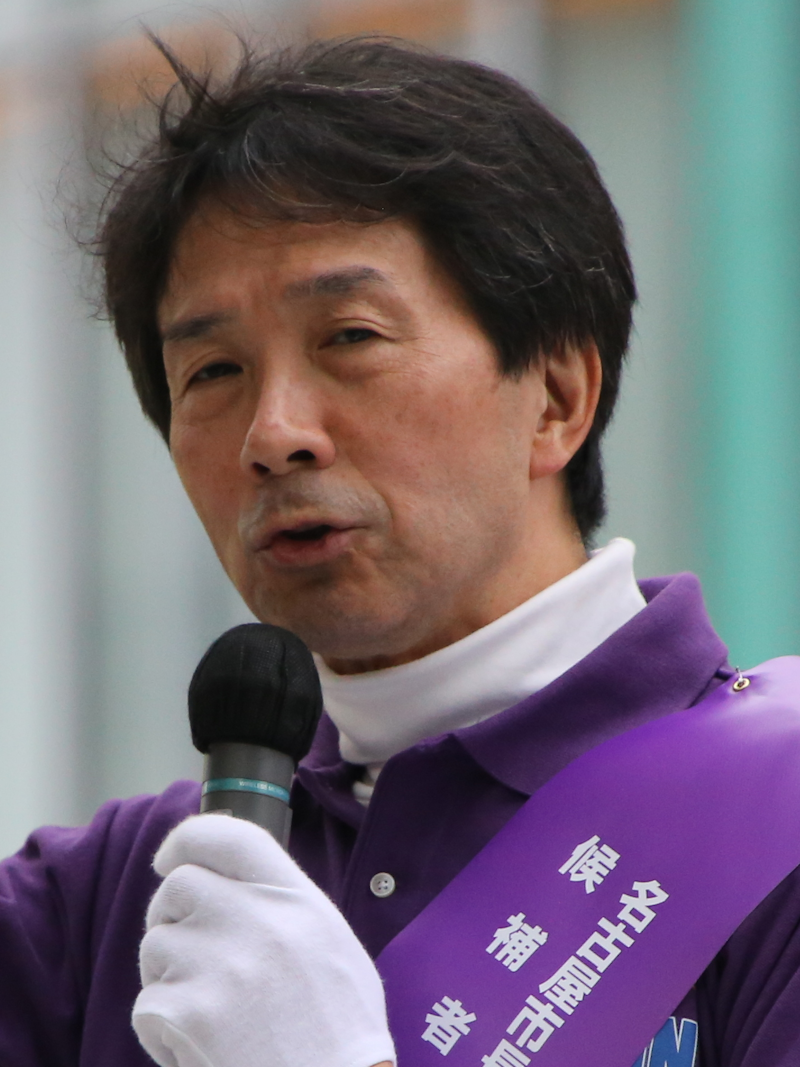
- Otsuka in 2024

Leader of the Democratic Party for the People
- In office 7 May 2018 – 4 September 2018 Co-leading with Yuichiro Tamaki
- Preceded by: Party established
- Succeeded by: Yuichiro Tamaki

President of the Democratic Party
- In office 31 October 2017 – 7 May 2018
- Preceded by: Seiji Maehara
- Succeeded by: Party dissolved

Member of the House of Councillors
- In office 23 July 2001 – 5 November 2024
- Preceded by: Makiko Suehiro
- Succeeded by: Vacant
- Constituency: Aichi at-large

Personal details
- Born: 5 October 1959 Nagoya, Aichi Prefecture, Japan
- Died: 2 March 2026 (aged 66) Nagoya, Aichi Prefecture, Japan
- Party: Independent (2024–2026)
- Other political affiliations: DPJ (2000–2016); DP (2016–2018); DPP (2018–2024)
- Education: Waseda University (PhD)
- Website: https://ohtsuka-kohei.jp/

Kohei Otsuka (大塚 耕平, Ōtsuka Kōhei; 5 October 1959 – 2 March 2026) was a Japanese politician. He was a leader of the Democratic Party for the People (DPP) and the Democratic Party (DP). A native of Nagoya, Aichi, he attended Waseda University and received a Ph.D. in fiscal and monetary policies and reforms. Afterwards, he worked at the Bank of Japan from 1983 to 2000 before being elected to the House of Councillors for the first time in 2001.

== Democratic Party leadership ==
After the 2017 general election, then-Democratic Party president Seiji Maehara faced intense criticism for his decision to disband the DP caucus in the Lower House and forcing DP members to seek re-election as members of Kibō no Tō, the CDP or as independents. As a result, Maehara resigned as DP president on 30 October 2017. Otsuka was elected unopposed to succeed Maehara the following day.

In May 2018, Otsuka led the DP to merge with Kibō no Tō, forming the DPFP. Otsuka became the co-leader of the new party, along with Kibō leader Yuichiro Tamaki. He chose not to run for a full 3-year term in the DPP leadership election in September 2018.

He stated his intent to leave the party in 2024, citing his desire to run for mayor of Nagoya. This came after Seiji Maehara and a group of others defected from the DPP due to party leader Yuichiro Tamaki's ambivalent stance on if he wished to join the LDP government or continue as an opposition member.

== Death ==
Otsuka died from heart failure on 2 March 2026, at the age of 66.
