= Taisuke Sato =

Japanese politician

- 佐藤 泰介

Member of the House of Councillors
- In office 26 July 1998 – 25 July 2010
- Preceded by: Yuzuru Tsuzuki
- Succeeded by: Yoshitaka Saitō
- Constituency: Aichi at-large

Member of the House of Representatives
- In office 18 February 1990 – 27 September 1996
- Preceded by: Kasuga Ikkō
- Succeeded by: Constituency abolished
- Constituency: Aichi 1st

Personal details
- Born: 27 September 1943 (age 83) Nagoya, Aichi, Japan
- Party: Democratic
- Other political affiliations: JSP (1990–1996); SDP (1996); DP (1996–1998)
- Education: Aichi University of Education

Taisuke Sato (佐藤 泰介, Satō Taisuke; born 27 September 1943) is a Japanese politician of the Democratic Party of Japan, a member of the House of Councillors in the Diet (national legislature).

== Early life ==
Sato is a native of Nagoya, Aichi and a graduate of the Aichi University of Education. He taught at local public schools prior to entering politics.

== Political career ==
Sato was elected to the House of Representatives for the first time in 1990 as a Japan Socialist Party candidate. In 1996, he lost re-election to the House of Representatives, but was elected to the House of Councillors for the first time in 1998. He served in the House of Councillors until 2010.
