= Sadamasa Oue =

Japanese military strategist (born 1959)

- 尾上 定正
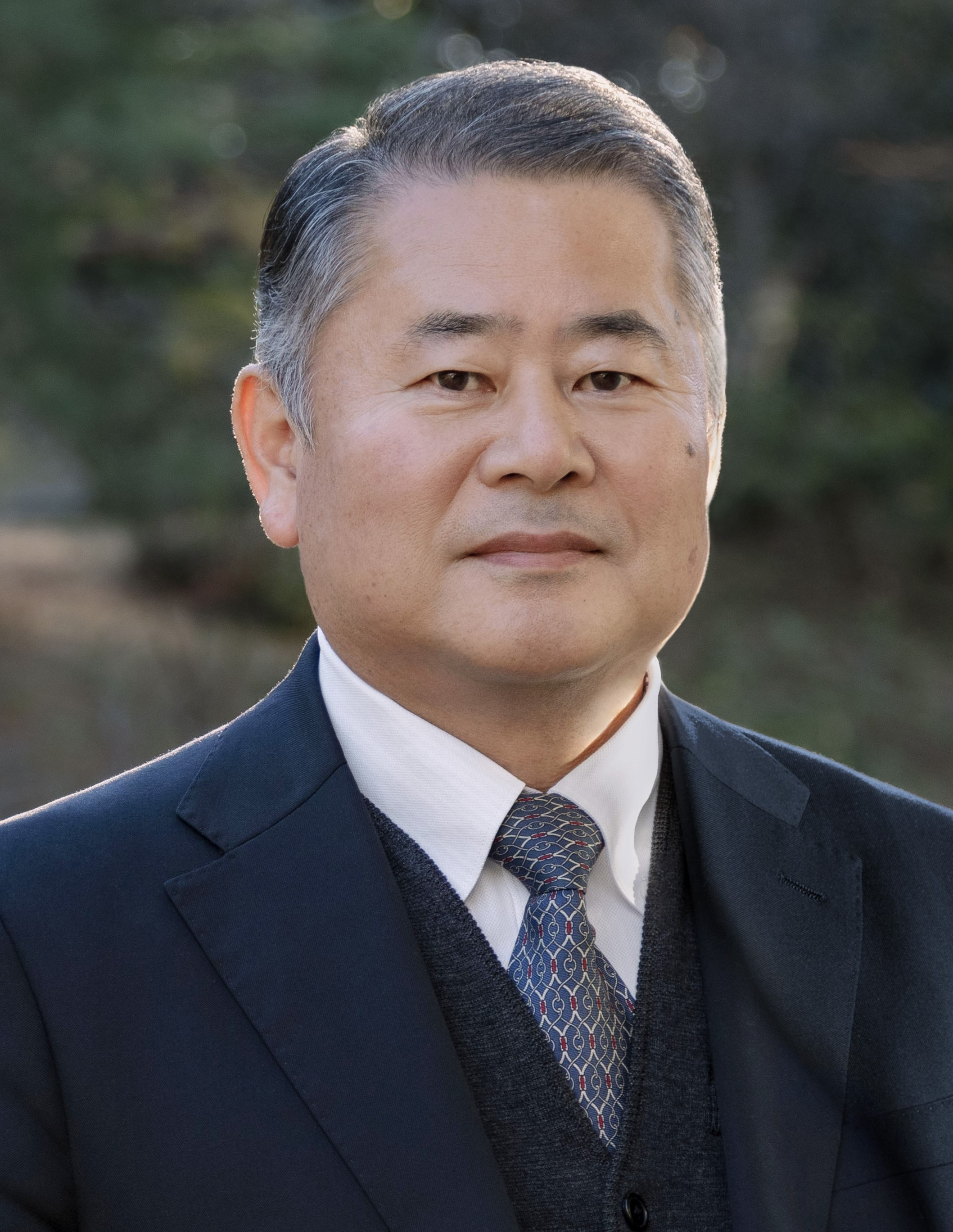
- Born: May 31, 1959 (age 67); Nara Prefecture, Japan
- Alma mater: National Defense Academy of Japan; Harvard Kennedy School; National War College
- Military career
- Allegiance: Japan
- Branch: Japan Air Self-Defense Force
- Service years: 1982–2017
- Rank: Lieutenant General (空将)
- Commands: Air Logistics Command; Northern Air Force; Air Staff College
- Other work: Senior Fellow, Sasakawa Peace Foundation; Special Advisor to the Cabinet (National Security & Nuclear Disarmament)

Sadamasa Oue (Japanese: 尾上 定正, romanized: Oue Sadamasa, born May 31, 1959) is a Japanese strategist, retired Japan Air Self-Defense Force (JASDF) Lieutenant General, and current Special Advisor to the Prime Minister of Japan (National Security and Nuclear Disarmament/Non-Proliferation Issues).

Sadamasa Oue attended the National Defense Academy of Japan as part of the 26th term. He graduated in 1982 and was subsequently commissioned as an officer in the Japan Air Self-Defense Force.

He formerly served as the Commander of the Northern Air Defense Force and the 24th Commander of the Air Logistics Command Following his retirement in 2017, he became a prominent advocate for defense reform, "Counterstrike Capabilities," and economic security integration. In October 2025, he was appointed as a Special Advisor to the Sanae Takaichi administration, focusing on national security and nuclear disarmament.

== Early life and education ==
Oue was born in Nara Prefecture and attended Nara High School. He graduated from the National Defense Academy of Japan (26th term) in March 1982 and joined the Air Self-Defense Force.

Oue is notable for his extensive education in the United States involving national security research. He earned a Master of Public Administration from the Harvard Kennedy School in 1997 and a Master of National Security Strategy from the National War College in 2002. During his time at the National War College, he received the "Distinguished Graduate" award. In 2019, he served as a Senior Fellow at the Harvard University Asia Center, where he researched the evolution of Japan's air power and the Japan-U.S. alliance.

== Military career ==
Throughout his career, Oue held positions in the government and JASDF, including Director of the Defense Planning Division at the Joint Staff Office. He was promoted to Lieutenant General in August 2013 and subsequently appointed as the 41st Commandant of the JASDF Air Staff College.

=== Northern Air Force (2014–2016) ===
From 2014 to 2016, Oue served as the Commander of the Northern Air Force, headquartered at Misawa Air Base. His tenure coincided with the aftermath of the annexation of Crimea and a resurgence of Russian military activity in the Far East. In fiscal year 2016, the JASDF conducted a record 1,168 scrambles, many against Russian Tu-95 bombers attempting to probe Japan's air defenses in the north.

During his tenure, the JASDF's role in intercepts was primarily to escort and issue warnings, operating under Rules of Engagement that prohibited offensive action unless attacked first. Oue later argued that this passive posture was becoming obsolete in the face of hypersonic threats and swarm tactics

=== Air Logistics Command (2016–2017) ===
He concluded his uniformed career as the 24th Commander of the Air Logistics Command from July 2016 to December 2017. In this role, he managed the logistics and supply chains of the JASDF, later criticizing the domestic defense industry's isolation from global standards which led to high costs and technological stagnation. He retired from active duty as a Lieutenant General in December 2017.

== Strategic philosophy and advocacy ==
Post-retirement, Oue became a prolific writer and strategist, involved in security policy as a researcher at the Sasakawa Peace Foundation and the Asia Pacific Initiative.

In his writings, including Significance and Challenges of Possessing the Counterstrike Capability, he argued that missile defense alone is insufficient and that Japan must possess the ability to strike enemy bases to establish deterrence. Oue argued that Japan's air strategy must fundamentally shift from passive "anti-airspace intrusion" measures to "offensive counter-air" operations. He emphasized the necessity of acquiring sixth-generation fighter capabilities to counter the development of next-generation aircraft by China, such as the J-36 and J-50. He has criticized the U.S. for vulnerabilities in the Japan-U.S. alliance.

Oue advocates for integrating the defense industry into Japan's economic security framework, arguing against the academic refusal to collaborate on military research. He has warned Japan of a Taiwan Emergency due to geographical proximity, asserting that Japan cannot remain neutral in a cross-strait conflict.

== Political appointment ==
In December 2023, Oue was appointed as a Policy Advisor to the Minister of Defense. Following the formation of the Takaichi Cabinet, he was appointed Special Advisor to the Prime Minister on October 21, 2025.

=== Nuclear armament controversy ===
Following his appointment, reports emerged from anonymous government sources that a debate on nuclear possession or sharing arrangements was occurring within the administration. Oue has previously written on the need for Japan to address its Non-Nuclear principles and realistically discuss extended deterrence.

== Selected works ==
- The Self-Defense Forces' True Strength and Counterstrike Capabilities (2022)
  - This was included as a primary section in Takaichi's book, Strategy of National Power: Making the Japanese Archipelago Strong and Rich
- Taiwan Emergency: Strategy for Japan's Role (Co-author)
