= Yuichiro Tamaki =

Japanese politician

- 玉木 雄一郎
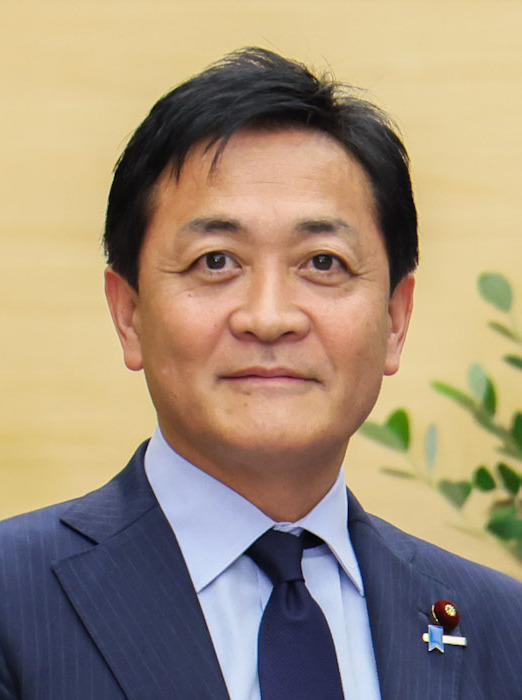
- Tamaki in 2025

Leader of the Democratic Party For the People
- Incumbent
- Assumed office 7 May 2018 (Note: Suspended from leadership position on 4 December 2024 until 3 March 2025, Motohisa Furukawa acted as the party leader during the interval. Co-leader with Kohei Otsuka from 7 May to 4 September 2018.)
- Secretary-General: Kazuya Shimba
- Preceded by: Party established

2nd Leader of Kibō no Tō
- In office 10 November 2017 – 7 May 2018 Serving with Yuriko Koike (until 14 November 2017)
- Deputy: Atsushi Oshima
- Preceded by: Yuriko Koike
- Succeeded by: Shigefumi Matsuzawa

Member of the House of Representatives
- Incumbent
- Assumed office 31 August 2009
- Preceded by: Yoshio Kimura
- Constituency: Kagawa 2nd

Personal details
- Born: 1 May 1969 (age 57) Sangawa, Kagawa, Japan
- Party: DPP (since 2018)
- Other political affiliations: DPJ (2005–2016); DP (2016–2017); KnT (2017–2018)
- Education: University of Tokyo (BA); Harvard University (MPA)

Yuichiro Tamaki (玉木 雄一郎, Tamaki Yūichirō; born 1 May 1969) is a Japanese politician and the leader of the Democratic Party For the People (DPFP). He is a member of the House of Representatives, and a former leader of Kibō no Tō. Before joining Kibō, Tamaki was a member of the Democratic Party.

== Early life and government career ==
Tamaki was born in Sangawa, a small rural town in Kagawa Prefecture. His parents are engaged in agriculture.

After graduating from the Faculty of Law, University of Tokyo, he joined the Ministry of Finance in 1993. With government sponsorship, he obtained an MPA from the John F. Kennedy School of Government in 1997, and thereafter served on secondments to the Ministry of Foreign Affairs (where he covered Jordan and Libya), the Financial Services Agency, Osaka Regional Tax Office, and the Cabinet Office. In the latter role, he worked closely with LDP Cabinet ministers Nobuteru Ishihara, Kazuyoshi Kaneko, and Seiichiro Murakami on administrative reform efforts.

== Political career ==
Tamaki resigned from government service in 2005 to run in the 2005 general election after both the Liberal Democratic Party and Democratic Party of Japan approached him to run. He chose to run as a DPJ candidate despite having recently worked in incumbent LDP Prime Minister Junichiro Koizumi's Cabinet Office. He lost in this race and spent the next four years living with his extended family in the countryside.

In his second electoral attempt in the 2009 general election, he won a seat representing the Kagawa 2nd district, and the DPJ took over the reins of government from the LDP. Tamaki held this seat in the 2012 general election, after which he was appointed Deputy Secretary-General of the DPJ, and held this seat again in the 2014 general election.

Tamaki was elected as co-leader of the Kibō no Tō party on 10 November 2017, alongside Yuriko Koike. He had been the front-runner for the role, with The Japan Times reporting that some members of the party even wanted him to replace Koike as the party's leader. Koike resigned as party leader four days later, making Tamaki the party's sole leader. In May 2018, Tamaki led a majority of Kibō members to merge with the Democratic Party (which Tamaki had previously been a member of), forming the Democratic Party For the People. Tamaki became the co-leader of the new party, along with DP leader Kohei Otsuka. He would then win a 3-year term as sole party leader in September 2018.

In 2019, Tamaki publicly proposed a meeting with Prime Minister Shinzo Abe to discuss constitutional reform, as well as a debate in the Diet on constitutional revision.

In September 2020, the DPFP disbanded, with most members joining the Constitutional Democratic Party. Tamaki and several other conservative DPFP members broke off to form their own party. Among other issues, Tamaki did not agree with the CDP's approach to lowering the consumption tax.

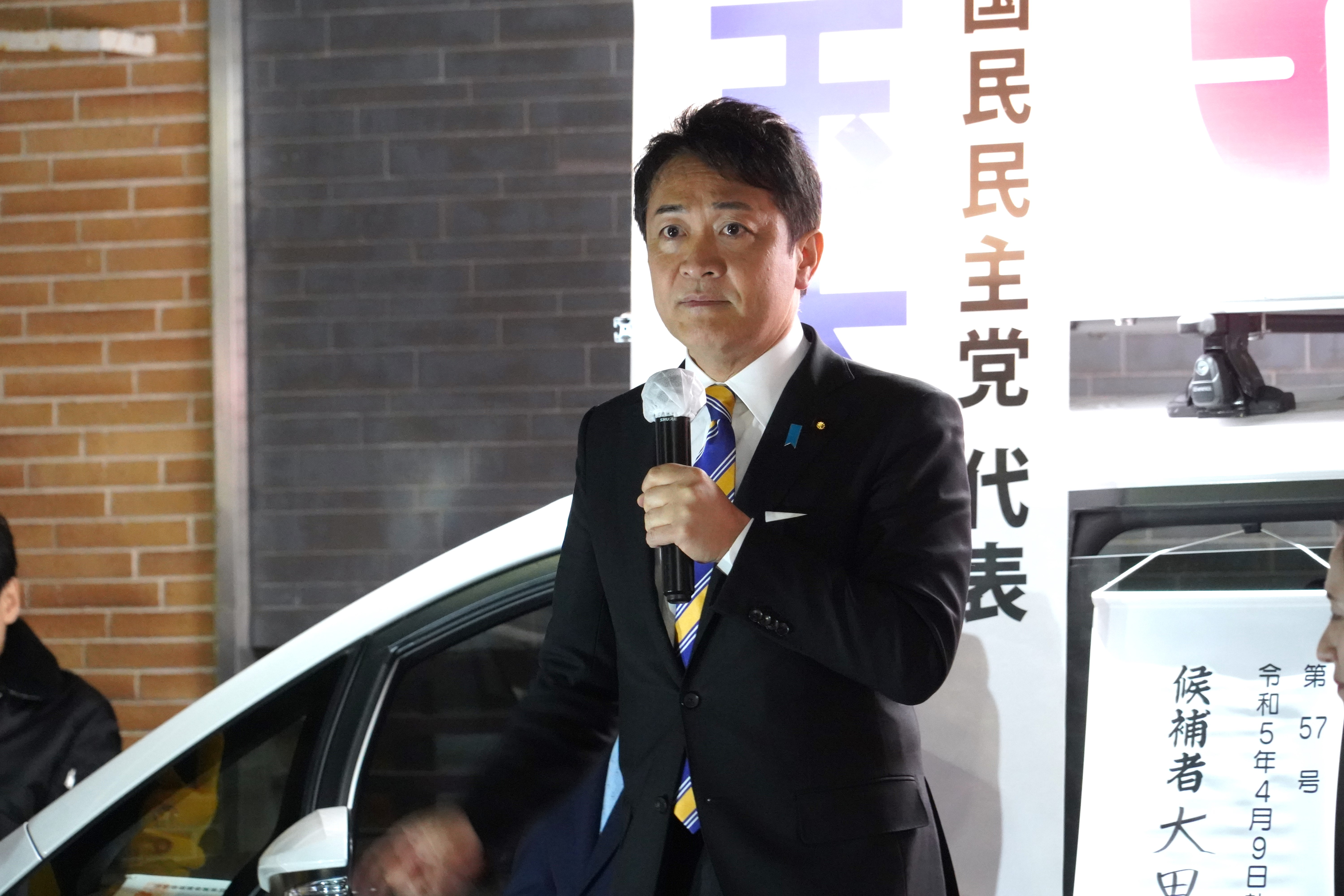
Tamaki speaking in 2023

Tamaki has been criticised by other elected politicians in his party for aligning the Democratic Party for the People with the ruling Liberal Democratic Party (LDP), particularly in cooperation between both parties on legislation. This led to a split in the party on 30 November 2023, where five of its elected politicians – four members of the House of Representatives and one member of the House of Councillors – left the party to form the Free Education For All.

In the House of Representatives election held in October 2024, Tamaki's DPFP achieved significant gains. With no single party reaching a majority, the DPFP, holding 28 seats, has become crucial in determining the balance of power. Western media referred to Tamaki as a "kingmaker." Although he received overtures from both Shigeru Ishiba and Yoshihiko Noda, he declined to join a coalition government, emphasizing a stance of deciding on each policy on a case-by-case basis.

In December 2024, Tamaki was suspended from party leadership for three months following a media report about an extramarital affair, which Tamaki admitted to after news of it broke in November. Tamaki said he would accept the decision made by party, but ruled out stepping down as leader.

On 4 March 2025, Tamaki resumed his role as a party leader.

== Political views ==
He supports the expansion of the Japan Self-Defense Forces' activities outside of Japan, saying that the 2015 Legislation for Peace and Security should be amended instead of being repealed. Tamaki is supportive of amending the constitution, as he says that not setting out the scope of the Japan Self-Defense Forces gave Abe too much authority of what they can do. Opponents of this position, such as Hiroshi Ogushi, say that this is unnecessary. Tamaki opposes the Technical Intern Training Program, saying that it should instead by replaced with a program that specifies what industry a worker may work in and what country they may come from.

On 4 January 2023, Tamaki visited Ise Grand Shrine on the same day as Prime Minister Fumio Kishida and then CDP leader Kenta Izumi. Some liberals, progressives and Christians in Japan criticized them for affirming historical colonialism and trying to revive militarism.

Tamaki criticised the LDP for its reluctance to criticise or take action against lawmaker Mio Sugita after she referred to same-sex relationships as "unproductive", referring to the LDP's treatment of her as "indulgent" and saying that the party "lacks sufficient recognition of LGBT issues and human rights", according news agency Kyodo News. In 2024, he caused controversy by referring to a political cartoon of Shigeru Ishiba and Yoshihiko Noda playing tug of war over him by saying, "I don't like it, seeing two men pulling me," and referring to the illustration as "gross". Taiga Ishikawa, an openly gay member of the House of Councillors, accused Tamaki of being unconsciously homophobic in a post on Twitter and in comments to the Mainichi Shimbun newspaper.

== Personal life ==
In November 2024, Tamaki acknowledged entering into an extramarital relationship and apologized after the weekly magazine Flash reported that he was seen in hotels in Takamatsu with a local tourism ambassador. On 4 December, the party decided to suspend Tamaki as its leader until 3 March 2025.
