= Yasuyuki Sakai =

Japanese politician

- 酒井 庸行
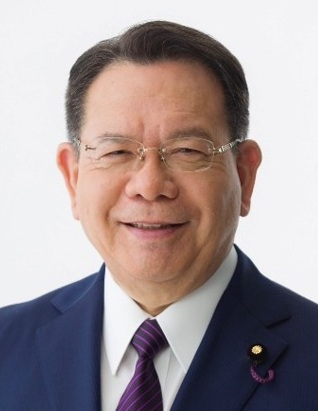
- Official portrait, 2025

Member of the House of Councillors
- Incumbent
- Assumed office 26 July 2013
- Preceded by: Seiji Suzuki
- Constituency: Aichi at-large

Member of the Aichi Prefectural Assembly
- In office 30 April 2003 – 4 July 2013
- Constituency: Kariya City

Member of the Kariya City Council
- In office 1995–1999

Personal details
- Born: 14 February 1952 (age 74) Kariya, Aichi, Japan
- Party: Liberal Democratic
- Education: Nihon University

Yasuyuki Sakai is a Japanese politician who is a member of the House of Councillors of Japan.

== Career ==
He was first elected in 2013.
