= Takae Itō (Aichi Prefecture politician) =

Japanese politician

- 伊藤 孝恵
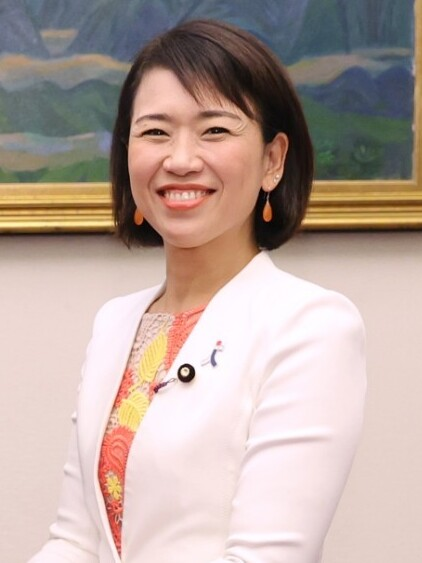
- Itō in 2023

Member of the House of Councillors
- Incumbent
- Assumed office 26 July 2016
- Preceded by: Seat established
- Constituency: Aichi at-large

Personal details
- Born: 30 June 1975 (age 51) Gero, Gifu, Japan
- Party: DPP (since 2018)
- Other political affiliations: DPJ (2015–2016); DP (2016–2018)
- Education: Kinjo Gakuin University

Takae Itō (born June 30, 1975, in Aichi Prefecture, Japan) is a Japanese politician who has served as a member of the House of Councillors of Japan since 2016. She represents the Aichi at-large district and is a member of the Democratic Party for the People.
