= Aichi at-large district =

Japan House of Councillors constituency

- 愛知県選挙区
- Parliamentary constituency for the House of Councillors
- Prefecture: Aichi
- Electorate: 6,128,080 (as of September 2022)

Current constituency
- Created: 1947
- Seats: 8
- Councillors: Class of 2019: Yasuyuki Sakai; Vacant (Note: Kohei Otsuka resigned to run for Mayor of Nagoya.); Maiko Tajima; Nobuo Yasue; Class of 2022: Masahito Fujikawa; Ryuji Satomi; Yoshitaka Saitō; Takae Ito

The Aichi at-large district is a constituency of the House of Councillors in the Diet of Japan that represents Aichi Prefecture. From 1947 until 2013 it has elected six Councillors, three every three years by single non-transferable vote (SNTV) for six-year terms. A 2015 revision of the Public Officers Election Law increased the district's representation to eight Councillors; the change began to take effect at the 2016 election, at which four Councillors were elected.

== Elected Councillors ==
Class of (1947/1953/...)				Election Year	Class of (1950/1956/...)			
#1 1947: #1, 6 Year Term	#2 1947: #2, 6 Year Term 1975: #1, 2 Year Term	#3 1947: #3, 6 Year Term	#4	Election Year	#1 1947: #4, 3 Year Term 1990: #1, 2 Year Term	#2 1947: #5, 3 Year Term 1966: #1, 2 Year Term 1994: #1, 1 Year Term	#3 1947: #6, 3 Year Term	#4
Takurō Yamanouchi (Indep.)	Saichi Yamada (JLP)	Shichirō Takenaka (Indep.)		1947	Ushirō Saeki (Indep.)	Ryōen Kusaba (JLP)	Yoshio Kuriyama (Indep.)	
Takurō Yamanouchi (Indep.)	Saichi Yamada (JLP)	Shichirō Takenaka (Indep.)		1950	Banji Naruse (JSP)	Ryōen Kusaba (LP)	Yoneji Yamamoto (LP)	
Hiroko Hasebe (Indep.)	Shinichi Kondō (Left, JSP)	Hideo Aoyagi (LP)		1953	Banji Naruse (JSP)	Ryōen Kusaba (LP)	Yoneji Yamamoto (LP)	
Hiroko Hasebe (Indep.)	Shinichi Kondō (Left, JSP)	Hideo Aoyagi (LP)		1956	Banji Naruse (JSP)	Ryōen Kusaba † 1966 (LDP)	Yoneji Yamamoto (LDP)	
Takeo Sugiura (LDP)	Shinichi Kondō (Left, JSP)	Hideo Aoyagi (LDP)		1959	Banji Naruse (JSP)	Ryōen Kusaba † 1966 (LDP)	Yoneji Yamamoto (LDP)	
Takeo Sugiura (LDP)	Shinichi Kondō (Left, JSP)	Hideo Aoyagi (LDP)		1962	Banji Naruse (JSP)	Ryōen Kusaba † 1966 (LDP)	Sakae Shibata (LDP)	
Ichiro Yagi (LDP)	Shinichi Kondō (Left, JSP)	Hideo Aoyagi (LDP)		1963 by-el.	Banji Naruse (JSP)	Ryōen Kusaba † 1966 (LDP)	Sakae Shibata (LDP)	
Ichiro Yagi (LDP)	Shinichi Kondō (Left, JSP)	Hideo Aoyagi (LDP)		1965	Banji Naruse (JSP)	Ryōen Kusaba † 1966 (LDP)	Sakae Shibata (LDP)	
Ichiro Yagi (LDP)	Shinichi Kondō (Left, JSP)	Hideo Aoyagi (LDP)		1966 by-el.	Banji Naruse (JSP)	Taro Yokoi (LDP)	Sakae Shibata (LDP)	
Ichiro Yagi (LDP)	Shinichi Kondō (Left, JSP)	Hideo Aoyagi (LDP)		1968	Banji Naruse (JSP)	Kunihiko Shibuya (Kōmeitō)	Sakae Shibata (LDP)	
Ichiro Yagi (LDP)	Shoji Suhara † 1975 (JSP)	Shigezo Hashimoto (LDP)		1971	Banji Naruse (JSP)	Kunihiko Shibuya (Kōmeitō)	Sakae Shibata (LDP)	
Ichiro Yagi (LDP)	Shoji Suhara † 1975 (JSP)	Shigezo Hashimoto (LDP)		1974	Shoji Morishita (JSP)	Shigenobu Sanji # 1994 (DSP)	Isshu Fujikawa (LDP)	
Ichiro Yagi (LDP)	Isamu Fukui (LDP)	Shigezo Hashimoto (LDP)		1975 by-el.	Shoji Morishita (JSP)	Shigenobu Sanji # 1994 (DSP)	Isshu Fujikawa (LDP)	
Ichiro Yagi (LDP)	Tomi Baba (Komeito)	Kei Inoue (DSP)		1977	Shoji Morishita (JSP)	Shigenobu Sanji # 1994 (DSP)	Isshu Fujikawa (LDP)	
Ichiro Yagi (LDP)	Tomi Baba (Komeito)	Kei Inoue (DSP)		1980	Kentaro Takagi † 1990 (Indep.)	Shigenobu Sanji # 1994 (DSP)	Hiroshi Ogi (LDP)	
Hiroshi Yoshikawa (LDP)	Tomi Baba (Komeito)	Kei Inoue (DSP)		1983	Kentaro Takagi † 1990 (Indep.)	Shigenobu Sanji # 1994 (DSP)	Hiroshi Ogi (LDP)	
Hiroshi Yoshikawa (LDP)	Tomi Baba (Komeito)	Kei Inoue (DSP)		1986	Kentaro Takagi † 1990 (Indep.)	Shigenobu Sanji # 1994 (DSP)	Hiroshi Ogi (LDP)	
Hiroshi Yoshikawa (LDP)	Kei Inoue (DSP)	Sachiko Maehata (JSP)		1989	Kentaro Takagi † 1990 (Indep.)	Shigenobu Sanji # 1994 (DSP)	Hiroshi Ogi (LDP)	
Hiroshi Yoshikawa (LDP)	Kei Inoue (DSP)	Sachiko Maehata (JSP)		1990 by-el.	Yoshihisa Oshima (LDP)	Shigenobu Sanji # 1994 (DSP)	Hiroshi Ogi (LDP)	
Hiroshi Yoshikawa (LDP)	Kei Inoue (DSP)	Sachiko Maehata (JSP)		1992	Kiyohiro Araki (Kōmeitō)	Shoji Shinma # 1994 (DSP)	Hiroshi Ogi (LDP)	
Hiroshi Yoshikawa (LDP)	Kei Inoue (DSP)	Sachiko Maehata (JSP)		1994 by-el.	Kiyohiro Araki (Kōmeitō)	Yuzuru Tsutugi (Indep.)	Hiroshi Ogi (LDP)	
Seiji Suzuki (LDP)	Mahiko Suehiro (Indep.)	Tamotsu Yamamoto (NFP)		1995	Kiyohiro Araki (Kōmeitō)	Yuzuru Tsutugi (Indep.)	Hiroshi Ogi (LDP)	
Seiji Suzuki (LDP)	Mahiko Suehiro (Indep.)	Tamotsu Yamamoto (NFP)		1998	Yoshitake Kimata (DPJ)	Taisuke Sato (DPJ)	Hiroko Hatta (JSP)	
Seiji Suzuki (LDP)	Kohei Otsuka (DPJ)	Tamotsu Yamamoto (Komeito)		2001	Yoshitake Kimata (DPJ)	Taisuke Sato (DPJ)	Hiroko Hatta (JSP)	
Seiji Suzuki (LDP)	Kohei Otsuka (DPJ)	Tamotsu Yamamoto (Komeito)		2004	Yoshitake Kimata (DPJ)	Taisuke Sato (DPJ)	Katsuhito Asano (LDP)	
Seiji Suzuki (LDP)	Kohei Otsuka (DPJ)	Kuniko Tanioka (DPJ)		2007	Yoshitake Kimata (DPJ)	Taisuke Sato (DPJ)	Katsuhito Asano (LDP)	
Seiji Suzuki (LDP)	Kohei Otsuka (DPJ)	Kuniko Tanioka (DPJ)		2010	Yoshitaka Saitō (DPJ)	Misako Yasui (DPJ)	Masahito Fujikawa (LDP)	
Yasuyuki Sakai (LDP)	Kohei Otsuka (DPJ)	Michiyo Yakushiji (Your Party)		2013	Yoshitaka Saitō (DPJ)	Misako Yasui (DPJ)	Masahito Fujikawa (LDP)	
Yasuyuki Sakai (LDP)	Kohei Otsuka (DPJ)	Michiyo Yakushiji (Your Party)		2016	Masahito Fujikawa (LDP)	Yoshitaka Saitō (DP)	Ryuji Satomi (Komeito)	Takae Itō (LDP)
Yasuyuki Sakai (LDP)	Kohei Otsuka (DPJ)	Maiko Tajima (CDP)	Nobuo Yasue (Komeito)	2019	Masahito Fujikawa (LDP)	Yoshitaka Saitō (DP)	Ryuji Satomi (Komeito)	Takae Itō (LDP)
Yasuyuki Sakai (LDP)	Kohei Otsuka (DPJ)	Maiko Tajima (CDP)	Nobuo Yasue (Komeito)	2022	Masahito Fujikawa (LDP)	Ryuji Satomi (Komeito)	Yoshitaka Saitō (CDP)	Takae Itō (LDP)

Party affiliations as of election day; #: resigned; †: died in office.

== Election results ==
2025
Party	Candidate	Votes	%	±%
DPP	Kouichi Mizuno			
CDP	Maiko Tajima (Incumbent)			
Sanseito	Junko Sugimoto			
LDP	Yasuyuki Sakai (Incumbent)			
Komeito	Nobuo Yasue (Incumbent)			
Genzei Nippon	Katsuyoshi Tanaka			
Reiwa	Megumu Tsuji			
Ishin	Sakura Hirota			
JCP	Hatsumi Suyama			
Team Mirai	Yukiya Yamane			
Social Democratic	Masato Ōnishi			
Nippon Seishinkai	Takeshi Sonohara			
Anti-NHK	Midori Yokoyama			
Nihon no Katei o Mamoru Kai	Satoru Ishihara			
Turnout		6,078,714	60.15%	+7.97%

2022
Party	Candidate	Votes	%	±%
LDP	Masahito Fujikawa (Incumbent)	878,403	28.37%	
Komeito	Ryūji Satomi (Incumbent) (Endorsed by Liberal Democratic Party)	443,250	14.32%	
CDP	Yoshitaka Saitō (Incumbent)	403,027	16.10%	
DPP	Takae Itō (Incumbent)	391,757	12.65%	
Ishin	Ichiro Hirosawa (Endorsed by Genzei Nippon)	351,840	11.36%	
JCP	Hatsumi Suyama	198,962	6.43%	
Reiwa	Gakiya Souji	108,922	3.52%	
Sanseito	Masaya Itō	107,387	3.47%	
Ishin Seitō Shinpū	Akihiko Ishikawa	40,868	1.32%	
Social Democratic	Umi Tsukazaki	39,569	1.28%	
Independent	Shunsuke Yamashita	36,370	1.17%	
Anti-NHK	Yuri Suenaga	27,497	0.89%	
Anti-NHK	Kenji Yamashita	21,630	0.70%	
Anti-NHK	Manami Hiraoka	16,359	0.53%	
Happiness Realization	Shusaku Soga	12,459	0.40%	
Anti-NHK	Yukinari Saito	9,842	0.32%	
Japan First	Den Mikio	8,071	0.26%	
Turnout		6,113,383	52.10%	+4.10%

2019
Party	Candidate	Votes	%	±%
LDP	Yasuyuki Sakai (Incumbent)	737,717	25.74%	
DPP	Kohei Otsuka (Incumbent)	506,817	17.69%	
CDP	Maiko Tajima	461,531	16.10%	
Komeito	Nobuo Yasue (Endorsed by Liberal Democratic Party)	453,246	15.82%	
Ishin	Maki Misaki	269,081	9.39%	
JCP	Hatsumi Suyama	216,674	7.56%	
Anti-NHK	Yukari Suenaga	85,262	2.98%	
Social Democratic	Ryohei Hirayama	43,756	1.53%	
Independent	Kin Ishii	32,142	1.12%	
Shijinashi	Hiroyuki Ushida	25,219	0.88%	
Workers' Party	Hitoshi Furukawa	17,905	0.62%	
Tsubasa Party	Ben Hashimoto	16,425	0.57%	
Turnout		6,119,143	48.18%	−7.23%

2016
Party	Candidate	Votes	%	±%
LDP	Masahito Fujikawa (Incumbent)	961,096	29.3	
Democratic	Yoshitaka Saito (Incumbent)	575,119	17.5	
Komeito	Ryuji Satomi (Endorsed by Liberal Democratic Party)	531,488	16.2	
Democratic	Takae Ito	519,510	15.8	
JCP	Hatsumi Suyama	302,489	9.2	
Genzei Nippon	Kayo Okuda	218,171	6.7	
Social Democratic	Ryohei Hirayama	64,781	2.0	
Japanese Kokoro	Makoto Igeta	59,651	1.8	
Happiness Realization	Hiromi Nakane	47,088	1.4	
Turnout				

2013
Party	Candidate	Votes	%	±%
LDP	Yasuyuki Sakai	1,056,145	35.4	
Democratic	Kōhei Ōtsuka (Incumbent)	741,598	24.9	
Your	Michiyo Yakushiji	347,411	11.6	
JCP	Nobuko Motomura	271,278	9.1	
Restoration	Hiroshi Kondō	263,918	8.5	
Genzei Nippon	Yukio Uta	152,038	5.1	
Green Wind	Makoto Hirayama (Incumbent)	62,985	2.1	
Social Democratic	Yoshinori Itō	47,104	1.6	
Happiness Realization	Hiromi Nakane	30,199	1.0	
Mitamayama	Sōsaburo Mitamayama	11,277	0.4	
Turnout		3,099,258	52.65	

2010
Party	Candidate	Votes	%	±%
LDP	Masahito Fujikawa	918,187		
Democratic	Yoshitaka Saitō	750,723		
Democratic	Misako Yasui	676,681		
Your	Michiyo Yakushiji	529,130		
JCP	Nobuko Motomura	193,710		
Social Democratic	Mitsuko Aoyama	102,989		
Happiness Realization	Hiromi Nakane	37,338		
Turnout		3,349,983	57.46	

2007
Party	Candidate	Votes	%	±%
Democratic	Kōhei Ōtsuka (Incumbent)	880,856		
LDP	Seiji Suzuki (Incumbent)	734,153		
Democratic	Kuniko Tanioka	720,777		
Komeito	Tamotsu Yamamoto (Incumbent)	587,268		
JCP	Hiroko Hatta	293,607		
Social Democratic	Ryōhei Hirayama	69,853		
Independent	Takashi Hyōdō	22,273		
Ishin Seitō Shinpū	Masaji Tsuge	13,301		
Kyōsei Shintō	Kōtarō Arakawa	12,435		
Turnout		3,397,619	59.12	
