= Democratic Party (Japan, 2016) =

Japanese political party

Democratic Party 民進党 Minshintō
- Abbreviation: DP
- Leader: Kohei Otsuka
- Founded: 27 March 2016; 10 years ago
- Dissolved: 7 May 2018; 8 years ago
- Merger of: Democratic Party; Japan Innovation Party
- Merged into: Democratic Party For the People
- Headquarters: Nagatachō, Chiyoda, Tokyo, Japan
- Newspaper: Minshin Press
- Ideology: Liberalism (Japanese); Faction: Conservatism (Japanese)
- Political position: Centre to centre-left; Faction: Centre-right
- Colors: Blue; Red

Website
- www.minshin.jp
- Politics of Japan; Political parties; Elections; A: The candidates of this party ran as independents in 2017 Lower house election and sat within Group of Independents and merged with Kibō no Tō to form DPFP, a party born from splits in the Liberal Democratic Party and Democratic Party.

The Democratic Party (民進党, Minshintō; DP) was a political party in Japan. It was the largest opposition party in Japan from 2016 until it lost its seats in the House of Representatives in 2017. The party was founded on 27 March 2016 from the merger of the Democratic Party of Japan and the Japan Innovation Party. The majority of the party split away on 28 September 2017, before the 2017 general election. Many of its members contested the 2017 election as candidates for the Party of Hope, Constitutional Democratic Party of Japan or as party members without nomination. On 7 May 2018 the DP merged with the Party of Hope to form the Democratic Party For the People.

== Name ==
The party's Japanese name Minshintō combines "min" from minshu ("democratic") and shin (進; "advance, progress"), not shin (新; "new") from ishin (innovation). A literal translation of the name in English would be "Democratic Progressive Party", similar to a Taiwanese centre-left party that shares the same Chinese characters. However, the party officially stated its English name as the Democratic Party.

== History ==
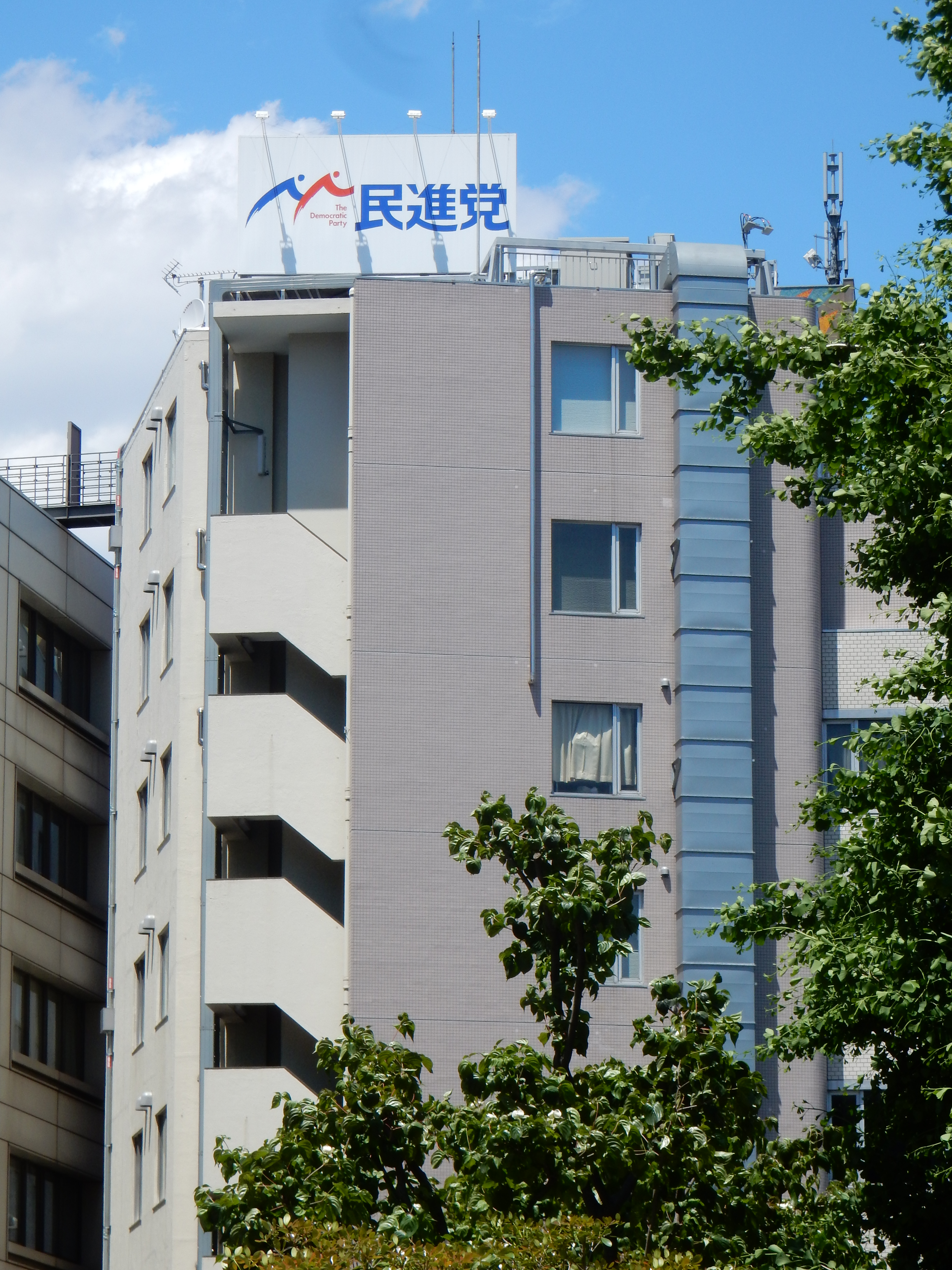
Democratic Party headquarters in Tokyo

=== Foundation ===
On 24 February 2016 the Democratic Party of Japan (DPJ) and the Japan Innovation Party (JIP) announced that they were to merge at a special convention on 27 March to form a new opposition party in order to better compete with the ruling Liberal Democratic Party (LDP) in an Upper House election that was scheduled for later the same year. On 4 March 2016, the DPJ and JIP asked the public for suggestions for a name for the merged party. On 14 March 2016, the name of the new party was announced as Minshintō (Democratic Progressive Party), the most popular shortlisted name among polled voters and preferred by the JIP, beating Rikken Minshutō (Constitutional Democratic Party) that was preferred by the DPJ. On 18 March 2016, the official English language title of the new party was announced as the Democratic Party. On 22 March, the DPJ announced that 4 sitting Representatives from Vision of Reform would join the party at its launch.

The new party was founded on 27 March 2016 with the leadership consisting of Katsuya Okada as party president, Yukio Edano as secretary-general and Shiori Yamao as policy chief. The party platform committed to protecting the existing pacifist Japanese constitution, and stating opposition to the "Abenomics" policies of Prime Minister Shinzō Abe.

=== 2016 House of Councillors election ===
The election on 10 July 2016 was the first major election contested by the new party. Following the merger, the party entered the election with 62 seats in the 242-seat House, with 45 of those 62 seats being contested. During the nomination period, the party signed an agreement with the Japanese Communist Party (JCP), Social Democratic Party and People's Life Party to field a jointly-endorsed candidate in each of the 32 districts in which only one seat is contested, uniting in an attempt to take control of the House from the ruling LDP–Komeito coalition. Despite the agreement, Democratic Party leader Okada stated that forming a coalition government with the JCP would be "impossible" in the near future due to some of the "extreme leftist policies" promoted by the JCP.

The party had a total of 55 official candidates contesting the election, the same number as the DPJ in the 2013 election and the third-most behind the LDP and Communist Party. 33 candidates contested the single- and multi-member districts and 22 were in the party's list for the 48-seat national proportional representation block. A further 15 independent candidates contesting single-seat districts were endorsed by the party. The party suffered a considerable defeat at the hands of the ruling coalition, losing 13 seats overall. Five of the 15 endorsed independents were also elected, including two that claimed seats formerly held by retiring Democratic Party members. Following the loss, Okada announced he would not seek re-election as leader at the party's annual meeting in September.

=== 2017 Tokyo Metropolitan Assembly election and Renhō's resignation ===
The 2017 Tokyo Metropolitan Assembly election caused the party to lose 13 seats in the Assembly, which left them with only 5 seats. This prompted both the secretary-general, Yoshihiko Noda, on 25 July 2017, and the president of the party, Renhō, on 27 July 2017, to resign. This is regarded as showing how public trust for the DP has declined.

=== 2017 leadership election ===
The election for a new leader to replace Renhō took place on 1 September, and campaigning began on 21 August. The two candidates were Seiji Maehara, who announced his intention to run on 2 August, and Yukio Edano, who declared his candidacy on 1 August. The election was won by Maehara.

=== 2017 House of Representatives election and aftermath ===
On 28 September 2017, Maehara announced that the party had abandoned plans to contest the 2017 general election scheduled for 22 October. The DP caucus in the House of Representatives disbanded, with the party's existing representatives set to contest the election as candidates for the Party of Hope recently formed by Tokyo governor Yuriko Koike or as independents. On 2 October 2017, DP deputy president Yukio Edano announced the formation of the Constitutional Democratic Party of Japan (CDP) for liberals and left-leaning members of the DP whom Koike had rejected for running as Party of Hope candidates. On 23 October 2017, in the aftermath of the election, Maehara announced his resignation as party president, with the CDP having replaced the DP as the largest opposition party in the lower house, while the DP continues to exist in the House of Councillors. On 31 October 2017, member of the House of Councillors Kohei Otsuka was chosen as the leader of the Democratic Party to succeed Maehara.

=== Road to a new party ===
In January 2018, the DP and the Party of Hope agreed to form a joint parliamentary group in both houses of the Diet, with each party remaining organisationally separate, but being subject to a common whip. However, several days later, the negotiations broke down. On 9 April 2018, it was announced that exploratory talks to merge the DP and Party of Hope into a new opposition party were being held.

On 24 April 2018, the leadership of the DP and the Party of Hope announced in a joint press conference that both parties had agreed to merge in May 2018 under the name National Democratic Party. Several factions in both parties did not plan to join the new party. The members of these factions are expected to form their own splinter parties or remain as independents. The DP and Party of Hope merged to form the Democratic Party For the People on 7 May 2018.

== Policies ==
Democratic Party are generally classified as centre to centre-left. However, unlike the "social-liberal" Democratic Party in 1998, it is generally regarded as a simple "liberal" party because it was founded by absorbing centre-right conservative parties.

The policies of the DP differed little from the policies of its predecessor, the DPJ, with policies such as increasing diversity, contributing to world peace, preserving democracy, and promoting prosperity. They are considered to be open-minded in terms of North Korea, with one member of the party saying that doing nothing would not be responsible. The DP, like its Democratic Party predecessor, is opposed to nuclear power. The DP wants to raise the minimum wage of Japan.

== Presidents of the Democratic Party ==
No.	Name (Birth–death)	Image	Constituency / title	Term of office		Election results	Prime Minister (term)
No.	Name (Birth–death)	Image	Constituency / title	Took office	Left office	Election results	Prime Minister (term)
Preceding parties: Democratic Party (1998) & Japan Innovation Party (centre)
1	Katsuya Okada (b. 1953)		Rep for Mie 3rd	27 March 2016	15 September 2016	see former DPJ 2015 election	Abe S. 2012–20
2	Renhō (b. 1967)		Cou for Tokyo	15 September 2016	1 September 2017	see 2016 election	Abe S. 2012–20
3	Seiji Maehara (b. 1962)		Rep for Kyoto 2nd	1 September 2017	30 October 2017	see Sep 2017 election	Abe S. 2012–20
4	Kohei Otsuka (1959-2026)		Cou for Aichi	31 October 2017	7 May 2018	see Oct 2017 election	Abe S. 2012–20
Successor parties: Constitutional Democratic Party (2017) (centre-left), Kibō no Tō (centre-right), & Democratic Party For the People (2018) (centre)

== Factions ==
The Democratic Party, like its predecessor Democratic Party of Japan, was composed of factions originating in the Liberal Democratic Party, Japan Socialist Party and the Democratic Socialist Party, augmented by the merger with the Japan Innovation Party. Significant factions existing within the party included:

- The Eda-Matsuno Group or the ex-Japan Innovation Party group (旧維新の党グループ Kyū Ishin no tō gurūpo) led by Kenji Eda and Yorihisa Matsuno, composed of the mostly Tokyo-centred group of the Japan Innovation Party that merged to form the Democratic Party in 2016 (the Osaka-centred group is now Nippon Ishin no Kai).
- The Kan Group or the "National Structure Research Council" (国のかたち研究会 Koku-no-katachi kenkyūkai) of former Prime Minister Naoto Kan, a moderate centrist group.
- The Akamatsu Group or "Sanctuary" (サンクチュアリ Sankuchuari) of Hirotaka Akamatsu, formerly of the JSP and a moderately social-democratic group.
- The Genba Group or the "Grand Design Japan Research Council (『日本のグランド・デザイン』研究会 Nihon no gurando-dezain" kenkyūkai) of Kōichirō Genba, a liberal group.
- The ex-DSP Group or Takagi Group, known as the "Democratic Socialist Association" (民社協会 Minsha kyōkai) of Yoshiaki Takaki and Hiroshi Nakai, representing the former Democratic Socialist Party tradition in the DP. Social-democratic, nationalist and revisionist.
- The Ōhata Group or the "Elementary Exchange Group" (素交会 Sokōkai) of Akihiro Ōhata, a moderate progressive group.
- The Yokomichi Group or the "New Political Discussion Group" (新政局懇談会 Shin-seikyoku kondankai) of former parliamentary speaker Takahiro Yokomichi. A social democratic group originating in the JSP and was one of the more left-wing factions of the party.
- The Hosono Group or the "Oath Committee" (自誓会 Jiseikai) of Gōshi Hosono. A conservative group.
- The Noda Group or "Kaisei Group" (花斉会 Kaseikai) of former Prime Minister Yoshihiko Noda. A moderately conservative group.
- The Hiraoka-Kondō or "Liberal Committee" (リベラルの会 Riberaru-no-kai) of Shōichi Kondō and Hideo Hiraoka. A progressive liberal group.
- The Nagashima Group or "National Axis Committee" (国軸の会 Kokujiku no kai) of Akihisa Nagashima. A conservative, nationalist and revisionist group.
- The Hata Group or "Governance Research Council" (政権戦略研究会 Seiken senryaku kenkyūkai) of former Prime Minister Tsutomu Hata, a moderate centrist group.

== Election results ==
=== General election results ===
Election	Leader	# of candidates	# of seats won	# of Constituency votes	% of Constituency vote	# of PR Block votes	% of PR Block vote	Government/opposition
2017	Seiji Maehara (de jure); Katsuya Okada (Note: Under the banner of "Group of Independents") (de facto)	30	(Note: Under the "Democratic Party" banner) 14 / 465	2,646,765	4.78%	no nomination	no nomination	Opposition

In the 2017 general election of members of the House of Representatives, the Democratic Party did not nominate any candidates. Several of its remaining members were elected without party nomination. Most of these joined the formation of the "Group of Independents" (Mushozoku no kai) House of Representatives caucus led by Katsuya Okada in October 2017. Some others such as Seiji Maehara have left the party after the election.

According to the party, its membership includes 14 members of the House of Representatives as of November, 2017:

- Katsuya Okada (member from Mie 3rd district serving in his 10th term)
- Kōichirō Genba (Fukushima 3, 9th term) – not member of the "Group of Independents" in the 195th Diet as of November 1, 2017, but an independent in terms of caucus membership (see List of members of the Diet of Japan)
- Jun Azumi (Miyagi 5, 8th term)
- Yoshihiko Noda (Chiba 4, 8th term)
- Masaharu Nakagawa (Mie 2, 8th term)
- Kazuhiro Haraguchi (Saga 1, 8th term)
- Hirofumi Hirano (Osaka 11, 7th term)
- Kenji Eda (Kanagawa 8, 6th term)
- Takashi Shinohara (Nagano 1, 6th term)
- Akio Fukuda (Tochigi 2, 5th term)
- Katsuhito Nakajima (Yamanashi 1, 3rd term) – not member of the "Group of Independents"
- Takahiro Kuroiwa (Niigata 3, 3rd term)
- Kazuhiko Shigetoku (Aichi 12, 3rd term) – not member of the "Group of Independents"
- Emi Kaneko (Fukushima 1, 2nd term)

=== Councillors election results ===
Election	Leader	# of seats total	# of seats won	# of National votes	% of National vote	# of National seats won	# of Prefectural votes	% of Prefectural vote	# of Prefectural seats won
2016	Katsuya Okada	49 / 242	32 / 121	11,751,015	21.0%	11 / 48	14,215,956	25.1%	21 / 73

=== Prefectural election results (incomplete) ===
- June 2016 Okinawa assembly election: Since the time of the national DPJ government, Democrats have been a minor force in the prefecture; the DP only nominated one candidate who was not elected.
- July 2016 Kagoshima gubernatorial election: DP and SDP supported the candidacy of former journalist Satoshi Mitazono who defeated LDP-Kōmeitō-supported three-term incumbent Yūichirō Itō.
- October 2016 Niigata gubernatorial election: Ryūichi Yoneyama (LDP→JRP→JIP→DP), previously head of the DP Niigata 5th district branch and former unsuccessful candidate for both Houses of the Diet, stood with leftist support (JCP, LP, SDP, NSP, Greens) and defeated LDP-Kōmeitō-supported Tamio Mori.
- July 2017 Tokyo assembly election: After having already lost several members to governor Koike's Tomin First no Kai in the run-up to the election, it lost another two seats in the election down to five.

== See also ==
- Category:Democratic Party (Japan, 2016) politicians
