= Kibō no Tō =

Japanese conservative political party

Kibō no Tō 希望の党
- Leader: Nariaki Nakayama
- Secretary-General: Kazunari Inoue
- Founder: Yuriko Koike
- Founded: 25 September 2017; 9 years ago (first iteration); 7 May 2018; 8 years ago (second iteration)
- Dissolved: 7 May 2018; 8 years ago (first iteration); 1 October 2021; 4 years ago (second iteration)
- Split from: Democratic Party; Liberal Democratic Party
- Merged into: Democratic Party For the People (first iteration)
- Headquarters: 2-17-10-203 Nagatachō, Chiyoda, Tokyo
- Ideology: Second incarnation (May 2018 – October 2021): Conservatism; First incarnation (until May 2018): Conservatism; Right-wing populism; Factions: National conservatism
- Political position: Second incarnation: Right-wing; First incarnation: Centre-right to right-wing
- Regional affiliation: Tomin First no Kai
- Colors: Green (official); Munsell blue (customary)

Website
- kibounotou.jp

Party of Hope (Japanese: 希望の党, Hepburn: Kibō no Tō) was a conservative political party in Japan founded by Tokyo Governor Yuriko Koike. The party was founded just before the call of the 2017 Japanese general election. The party's ideology was mainly Japanese conservatism and nationalism. Kibō no Tō merged with the Democratic Party to form the Democratic Party for the People on 7 May 2018; however, some right-wing populist members decided to form a new party with the same name. In October 2021, the party disbanded a second time.

== History ==
In the 2016 Tokyo gubernatorial election, Governor Koike was elected as the Governor with membership of the Liberal Democratic Party (LDP) even though she was not the official candidate of the party. (Note: The official candidate was Hiroya Masuda.) She then formed the regional party Tomin First no Kai, which was founded for the 2017 Tokyo prefectural election. The Komeito party supported Governor Koike in the metropolitan council, even though they were part of the coalition government with the LDP at the national level. At this time, the party was described as centre-right.

On 25 September 2017, after Prime Minister Shinzo Abe had called 2017 Japanese general election for 22 October, Koike announced that she will found a national party called Kibō no Tō based on the Tomin First no Kai. Because Kibō no Tō at the time declared it as a centrist liberal party, the support rate of it was once ranked the second among political parties in Japan briefly after its foundation. The largest opposing party Democratic Party (DP) at the time, troubled by its continuous low support rate since 2012, announced that the party had abandoned plans to contest the 2017 general election because Seiji Maehara, a conservative in DP and the leader of DP at the time, decided to start the merger with Kibō no Tō. The DP caucus in the House of Representatives disbanded, with many of the party's existing representatives contesting the election as candidates for Kibō no Tō. This led to the split on 2 October 2017 of the Constitutional Democratic Party (CDP), which consists of left-leaning and liberal DP politicians whom Koike had rejected as Kibō no Tō candidates.

It was reported that the Kibō no Tō is tightly connected to some far-right organizations like Ganbare Nippon founded by Satoru Mizushima. Some members of Kibō no Tō, such Nariaki Nakayama, are also far-right. The support rate of Kibō no Tō then dramatically decreased before the election and finally it only won 50 seats, even lower than the newly-founded Constitutional Democratic Party of Japan (CDPJ). In the 2017 Kibō no Tō leadership election held on 10 November, Yūichirō Tamaki was elected in the caucus election by a margin of 39 to 14. Koike resigned as party leader on 14 November as a result of the poor performance in the general election, leaving Tamaki as a sole leader. On 24 April 2018, the leadership of Kibō and the Democratic Party (DP) announced in a joint press conference that both parties agreed to merge in May 2018 under the name Democratic Party for the People (DPFP). Several factions in both parties do not plan to join the new party. The members of these factions are expected to form their own splinter party, join other parties or become independents.

=== Post-DPFP merger reestablishment ===
Prior to the merger, far-right members of Kibō led by Shigefumi Matsuzawa stated that they intended to form a separate party that retains the Kibō no Tō name. The party was formed on 7 May 2018, on the same day with the DPFP merger. On 5 June 2018, Former Secretary-general Kuniko Koda left the party, so Kibō no Tō lost its legal status as a political party and became a political organization.

On 28 May 2019, Matsuzawa resigned as party leader, and Nariaki Nakayama became the new party leader. On 10 October 2021, Nakayama, the only member of the Diet, did not run for the next House of Representatives election and indicated his intention to retire from politics. On 18 October, Nakayama officially announced his retirement at a press conference, revealing that the party he represented had dissolved on 1 October.

== Presidents of the party ==
No.	Name	Image	Term of office		Election results
No.	Name	Image	Took office	Left office	Election results
1	Yuriko Koike		25 September 2017	14 November 2017	Unopposed
2	Yuichiro Tamaki		14 November 2017	7 May 2018	Unopposed
3	Shigefumi Matsuzawa		7 May 2018	28 May 2019	Unopposed
4	Nariaki Nakayama		28 May 2019	1 October 2021	Unopposed

== Election results ==
=== House of Representatives ===
Election	Leader	Constituency			Party list			Total	Status
Election	Leader	Votes	%	Seats	Votes	%	Seats	Total	Status
2017	Yuriko Koike	11,437,602	20.64	32 / 176	9,677,524	17.36	18 / 289	50 / 465	Opposition

== Logos ==
(2017–2018)

(2018–2022)

== See also ==
- List of political parties in Japan
