= Reiko Matsushita =

Japanese female politician (1970-)

- 松下 玲子

Member of the House of Representatives
- In office November 1, 2024 – January 23, 2026
- Constituency: Tokyo PR

6th Mayor of Musashino
- In office October 9, 2017 – November 30, 2023
- Preceded by: Morimasa Murakami
- Succeeded by: Yasuhiro Omino

Member of the Tokyo Metropolitan Assembly
- In office July 23, 2005 – July 22, 2013
- Constituency: Musashino City

Personal details
- Born: September 26, 1970 (age 56) Nagoya, Aichi, Japan
- Party: CRA (since 2026)
- Other political affiliations: DPJ (2005–2016); DP (2016–2017); Independent (2017–2023); CDP (2023–2026)
- Spouse: Married
- Children: 1
- Education: Faculty of Letters, Jissen Women's University; Gradudate School of Economics, Waseda University
- Occupation: Politician
- Website: Official Website

Reiko Matsushita (松下 玲子) (born September 26, 1970) is a Japanese politician and member of the House of Representatives (1 term) for the Constitutional Democratic Party of Japan. Her married surname is Uchida (内田). She served as the sixth mayor of Musashino City, Tokyo, and as a member of the Tokyo Metropolitan Assembly (two terms).

== Early life ==
Born in Nagoya, Aichi Prefecture. Due to her father's frequent transfers as a news agency employee, she spent her kindergarten years in Shinjuku Ward. She attended Yokohama Municipal Nagano Elementary School, Yokohama Municipal Nagatani Junior High School, Tomakomai Municipal Wako Junior High School, Hokkaido Tomakomai Higashi High School, and Jissen Women's Junior College, Department of Japanese Literature. In March 1993, she graduated from the Department of Aesthetics and Art History, Faculty of Literature, Jissen Women's University. In April of the same year, she began working at Sapporo Breweries as a general employee.

== Career ==
Matsushita would arrive at the Miura Peninsula on Friday nights, stay at a training camp, and spend weekends practicing sailing in Sagami Bay. She spent her days immersed in yacht racing, but she changed her mind and took the company's internal exam to switch to a general position. She was in charge of human resources in the general affairs department. During her tenure there, she became interested in social security issues, and enrolled in a correspondence course at Keio University.

She left the company in 2001. In 2004, she completed a master's degree in applied economics at the Graduate School of Economics at Waseda University. In the same year, she enrolled in the Matsushita Institute of Government and Management. At the time, she was considering becoming a management consultant.

=== Tokyo Metropolitan Assembly Member ===
In 2005, she ran for the 17th Tokyo Metropolitan Assembly election in the Musashino City constituency as a Democratic Party candidate, defeating the incumbent Liberal Democratic Party (LDP) candidate, Yasuhiro Omino. In 2009, she was re-elected in the 18th Tokyo Metropolitan Assembly election.

=== After losing the election ===
In the 19th Tokyo Metropolitan Assembly election in June 2013, facing headwinds against the Democratic Party of Japan, which had lost power the previous year, she ran with the support of former Prime Minister Naoto Kan ( who had been re-elected in the Tokyo proportional representation block in the 46th general election for the House of Representatives in 2012), whose base is Tokyo's 18th district, including Musashino City. However, she was defeated by Yoshiji Shimazaki, a newcomer endorsed by the Liberal Democratic Party.

In the 20th Tokyo Metropolitan Assembly election in June 2017, she ran in the Musashino City constituency as a candidate endorsed by the Democratic Party. She received endorsements and support from the Tokyo Seikatsusha Network, the Liberal Party, and the Green Party Greens Japan, but was defeated by a newcomer, Kunikazu Suzuki, endorsed by the Tomin First no Kai, by about 5,000 votes.

=== Mayor of Musashino City ===
On August 14 of the same year, Musashino City Mayor Morimasa Okami announced his intention to retire and not run in the 2019 mayoral election. On the 18th of the same month, Matsushita announced her intention to run as an independent in the Musashino City mayoral election. Following on from her run in the Tokyo Metropolitan Assembly election, she received broad support from opposition parties including the Democratic Party, the Japanese Communist Party, the Liberal Party, the Social Democratic Party, and the Tokyo Living Network, and ran on the platform of "continuing Okami's administration." In the mayoral election held on October 1, she defeated former city council member Koichiro Takano, who was endorsed by the LDP, and was elected for the first time.

In 2021, a proposal for a referendum was submitted to grant voting rights to "all foreign nationals aged 18 or older who have been residing in the city for more than three months," meaning that "short-term residents such as international students also have the right to vote," but it was rejected in December of the same year. At the "Basic Autonomy Ordinance Symposium" held on November 3, 2022, it was stated that according to Article 19 of the Musashino City Basic Autonomy Ordinance, the establishment of necessary matters will be determined by separate ordinance, and that the opinions of citizens and the assembly will be sought in the future.

Following her nomination as successor to Naoto Kan, who indicated he would not run in the upcoming general election for the House of Representatives, Matsushita announced her intention to run as a candidate endorsed by the Constitutional Democratic Party in Tokyo's 18th district. Kan stated that he was "adjusting the timing of his resignation so as not to affect city administration", but stated that he would submit his resignation notice on the 10th of the same month, with an effective date of the 30th of the same month. His acting position will be filled by Deputy Mayor Hideho Ito. In the mayoral election held on December 24 of the same year to elect a successor, he fielded former Musashino City Council member Yuko Sasaoka as his successor candidate, but she lost to Yasuhiro Omino, also a former Musashino City Council member who was endorsed by the LDP and Komeito Party. This marked the first shift to conservative city administration since Masatada Tsuchiya retired in 2005.

=== Member of the House of Representatives ===
Four candidates ran in the 50th general election for the House of Representatives on October 27, 2024, in the New Tokyo 18th District (Musashino City, Koganei City, Nishitokyo City): Matsushita, Kaoru Fukuda of the LDP, Yukiko Tokunaga of the Sanseitō Party, and Ryo Higuchi of the Japanese Communist Party. Fukuda defeated Matsushita by approximately 2,200 votes and won his first election. The Constitutional Democratic Party won five seats in the Tokyo proportional representation block. Matsushita, who had the second-lowest defeat rate (97.796%), won her first election through proportional representation.

== Political positions ==
=== Article 9 of the Constitution ===
On November 17, 2019, the inaugural meeting of the National Association of Mayors for Article 9, a group of current and former mayors who oppose the revision of Article 9 of the Constitution, was held at Meiji University 's Liberty Tower. As of that day, there were 131 initiators and supporters, 13 of whom were currently serving in office. Matsushita was elected as one of the eight co-representatives.

=== Sexual minorities ===
On October 9, 2019, the Musashino Rainbow Telephone Consultation Service was launched to provide consultations regarding sexual orientation and gender identity. On October 29, the Rainbow Musashino Declaration was issued, proclaiming understanding and respect for sexual diversity. The city also announced that it would begin considering the introduction of a same-sex partnership system from fiscal year 2020.

In September 2021, the city submitted a bill to amend the Musashino City Ordinance on Promoting Gender Equality to the city council, which would include a "Partnership Declaration System" that would recognize LGBT and other sexual minority couples as being in a relationship equivalent to marriage. The bill was passed on the 22nd of the same month. The system began operation on April 1, 2022.

=== Freedom of Expression ===
According to a survey conducted by the Entertainment Freedom of Expression Association in October 2024, respondents said that sexually explicit manga, anime, games, etc. should not be regulated by law. They also expressed the view that "regulations under the new AV law "are problematic from the perspective of freedom of expression."

=== Tokyo Olympic and Paralympic Games ===
On June 4, 2021, Panasonic submitted a request to the Tokyo Metropolitan Government to cancel the "Live Site" at Inokashira Park, which is scheduled to be a public viewing venue for the Tokyo Olympic and Paralympic Games.

On June 25, 2021, the Musashino City Board of Education decided to cancel joint viewing events for city elementary and junior high schools at the Tokyo Olympic and Paralympic Games due to the risk of COVID-19 infection.

=== Foreigner policy and permanent foreign residents ===
On November 12, 2021, the city announced its intention to enact a referendum ordinance that would allow foreign residents to vote without any requirements. The ordinance was submitted to the regular city council meeting that opened on the 19th. Of the municipalities nationwide with permanent referendum ordinances, 43 recognize the right to vote for foreigners, but only Zushi City in Kanagawa Prefecture and Toyonaka City in Osaka Prefecture have ordinances that do not require a period of residence. At a regular press conference, Matsushita explained, "The purpose is to add the referendum system as one of the means to promote citizen participation, and we see no rational reason to exclude foreign nationals." As both supporters and opponents held street demonstrations in the city and public discussion grew day by day, a vote was held at the city council plenary session on December 21 of the same year, and the bill was rejected by a vote of 11 in favor and 14 against. Matsushita told reporters that he intends to further listen to the opinions of citizens and reconsider the draft ordinance. At the "Basic Autonomy Ordinance Symposium" held on November 3, 2022, he stated that according to Article 19 of the Musashino City Basic Autonomy Ordinance, the establishment of necessary matters will be determined by separate ordinance, and that he would seek the opinions of citizens and the assembly in the future. Some newspapers reported this as an "intention to resubmit" the bill, leading musician Kiminori Sera to criticize, saying, "What is the reason for persistently trying to pass something that was rejected?"

=== Others ===
On November 25, 2020, the city announced that it would raise the upper age limit for children eligible for medical expenses subsidies from 15 to 18 years old, and would propose a related ordinance amendment to the city council in December.

== Personal ==
She is a politician from the home district of former Prime Minister Naoto Kan of the Constitutional Democratic Party of Japan, and has had a close relationship with him, receiving election support and campaign speeches from him many times since his days as a member of the Tokyo Metropolitan Assembly. In the Musashino mayoral election, she received support from the Constitutional Democratic Party, the Japanese Communist Party, the Reiwa Shinsengumi, and the Social Democratic Party. In November 2023, Matsushita announced her intention to run in the next House of Representatives election, claiming that she had been nominated by Kan Naoto as his successor, and resigned as mayor of Musashino City. He served as a campaign manager for Kan's eldest son, Kan Gentaro, in the Musashino City Council by-election, which was held on the same day as the mayoral election following his resignation. During the election campaign, Matsushita posted, "I am Kan Naoto's successor to the House of Representatives, so Kan Gentaro, who is running in the Musashino City Council by-election, may seem like a hereditary successor, but he is not," thereby attempting to dispel criticism of hereditary succession. Her hobbies are cooking, rakugo, theater, movies, and art appreciation. Her motto is "Do your best and leave the rest to fate." Her family includes her husband (who is from Niigata Prefecture) and a son.

== Lawsuit ==
On August 25, 2022, former Musashino City Mayor Masatada Tsuchiya filed a lawsuit in the Tokyo District Court seeking damages for damages, alleging that Musashino City had sold city-owned land below market value and purchased replacement land at a higher price in two land transactions with a Chiyoda-ku real estate developer in 2021, causing damage to the city by selling the land at an unreasonably low price and purchasing replacement land at a higher price from the developer. Because the real estate developer accepted a tender offer by a Hong Kong fund, it has been reported that the management rights of the former Kichijoji Odori Higashi Bicycle Parking Lot, located about a one-minute walk from JR Kichijoji Station and sold by Panasonic, will be sold to the Hong Kong fund. On October 10, 2024, the Tokyo District Court dismissed Tsuchiya's lawsuit. Tsuchiya appealed to the Tokyo High Court. On June 12, 2025, the Tokyo High Court upheld the lower-instance ruling and dismissed Tsuchiya's appeal.

== Election history ==
House of Representatives (Japan)
Preceded by	Member of the House of Representatives for Tokyo proportional 2024–present	Incumbent
Political offices
Preceded by Unknown	Mayor of Musashino City, Tokyo; 2017-2023	Succeeded by Unknown
Preceded by Unknown	Tokyo Metropolitan Assembly Member; 2005-2013	Succeeded by Unknown
