= 2016 Tokyo prefectural by-election =

A by-election was held on 31 July 2016 to fill vacancies in four districts of the Tokyo Metropolitan Assembly. The elections were held simultaneously with the gubernatorial election. Nominations for the election were announced on 22 July 2016. Liberal Democratic Party candidates won all four elections.

== Ota district ==
The Ota district, which corresponds with Ota city, elects eight members to the 127-member assembly. Ken Tanaka, a second-term Democratic Party member who placed 1st in the 2009 election and 7th in the 2013 election, resigned from his seat in the assembly to contest the next national general election. In the closest contest of the four districts, LDP candidate Hiroyuki Yamamori defeated Democratic Party candidate Ai Mori by 4,141 votes (1.32%).

Tokyo prefectural by-election, 2016 (Ota District)
Party	Candidate	Votes	%	±%
LDP	Hiroyuki Yamamori	135,233	43.11	
Democratic	Ai Mori	131,092	41.79	
Independent	Koichi Mizoguchi	47,400	15.11	
Total valid votes		313,725	91.85	
Informal votes		27,844	8.15	
Turnout		341,569	57.29	+12.79

== Shibuya district ==
The Shibuya district, which corresponds with Shibuya city, elects two members to the assembly. Liberal Democrat Hideko Murakami, who was serving her fourth term in the assembly since being first elected in the November 2003 by-election, resigned from the assembly to contest the Shibuya mayoral election that was held on 26 April 2015, in which she placed third.

Tokyo prefectural by-election, 2016 (Shibuya District)
Party	Candidate	Votes	%	±%
LDP	Kazushige Maeda	45,807	46.30	
Democratic	Hiroki Hamada	35,559	35.94	
JCP	Yuji Orikasa	17,576	17.76	
Total valid votes		98,942	92.92	
Informal votes		7,540	7.08	
Turnout		106,482	57.17	+21.51

== Shinjuku district ==
The Shinjuku district, which corresponds with Shinjuku city, elects four members to the 127-member assembly. Kenichi Yoshizumi resigned from the assembly to contest the November 2014 Shinjuku mayoral election, which he won.

Tokyo prefectural by-election, 2016 (Shinjuku District)
Party	Candidate	Votes	%	±%
LDP	Sachie Daimon	55,599	40.06	
Democratic	Masami Inotsume	33,983	24.49	
Independent	Tsukasa Moriguchi	24,664	17.77	
JCP	Takeki Fujiwara	24,529	17.68	
Total valid votes		138,775	92.47	
Informal votes		11,308	7.53	
Turnout		150,083	56.97	+14.74

== Taito district ==
The Taito district, which corresponds with Taito city, elects two members to the 127-member assembly. Liberal Democrat Yukuo Hattori, who was serving his third term in the assembly, resigned to contest the Taito mayoral election on 1 March 2015, which he won with 47.9% of the vote in a six-candidate contest.

Tokyo prefectural by-election, 2016 (Taito District)
Party	Candidate	Votes	%	±%
LDP	Hiroshi Izumi	53,920	62.57	
JCP	Shigeru Koyanagi	32,252	37.43	
Total valid votes		86,172	92.20	
Informal votes		7,290	7.80	
Turnout		93,462	59.43	+16.91
