= 2017 Tokyo prefectural election =

Election in Japan

- 2 July 2017

All 127 seats in the Tokyo Metropolitan Assembly 64 seats needed for a majority
- Turnout: 51.28%(▲7.78%)
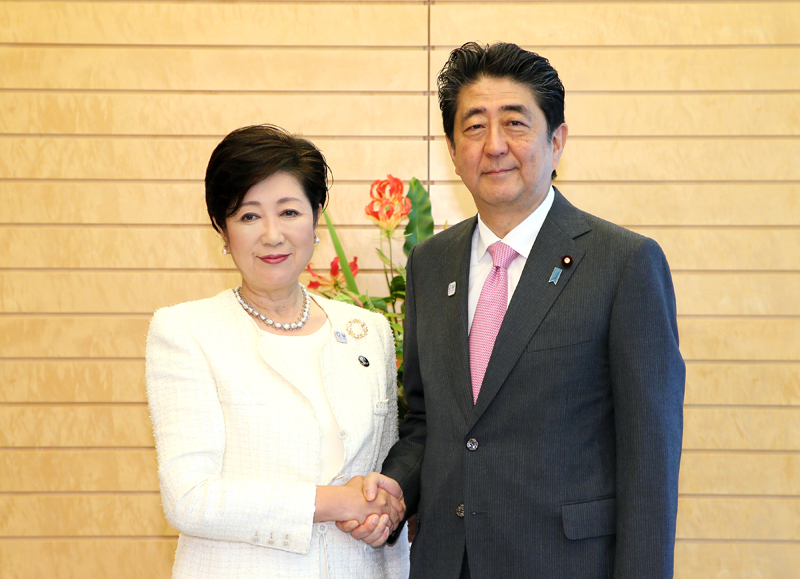

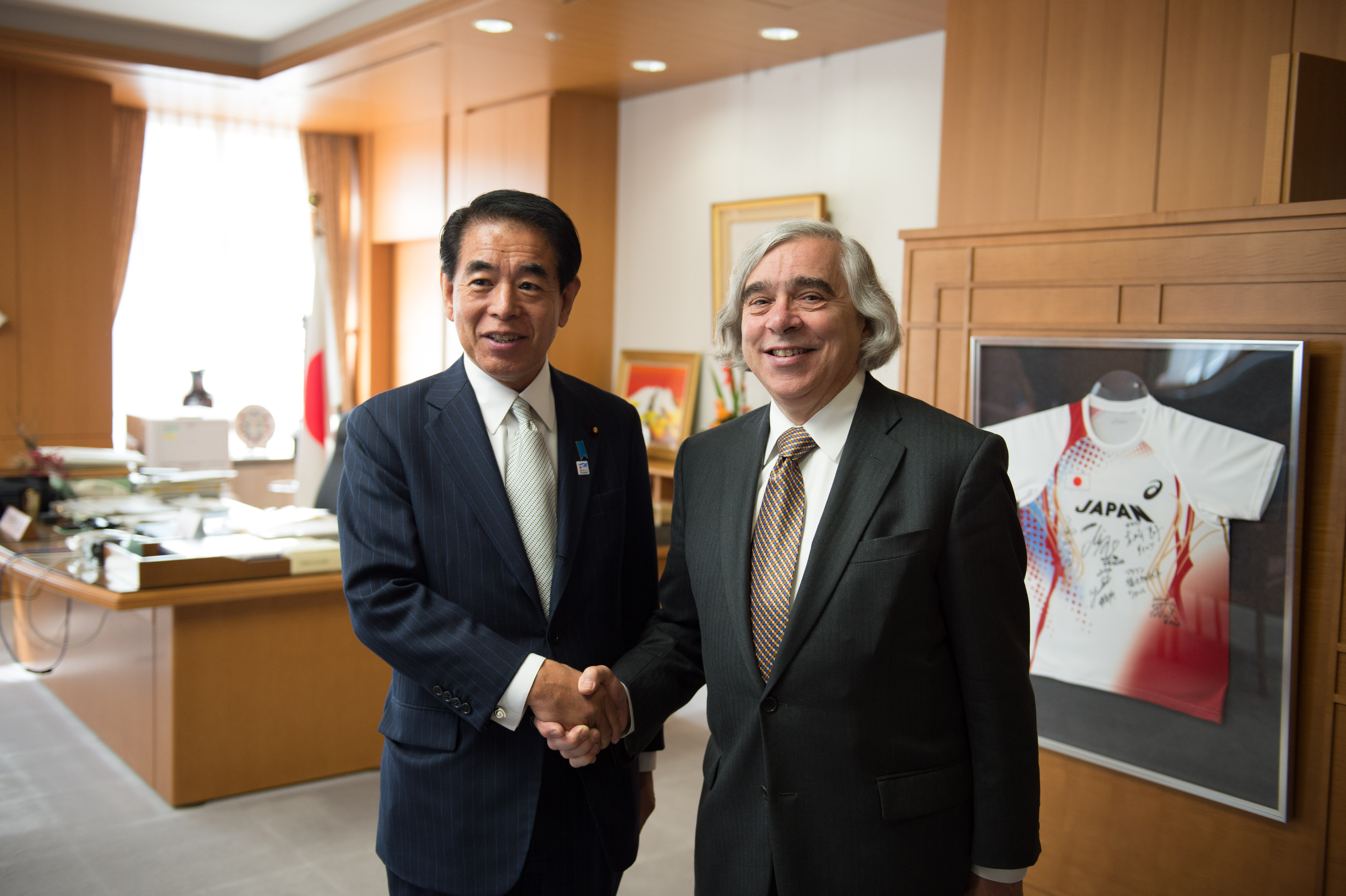

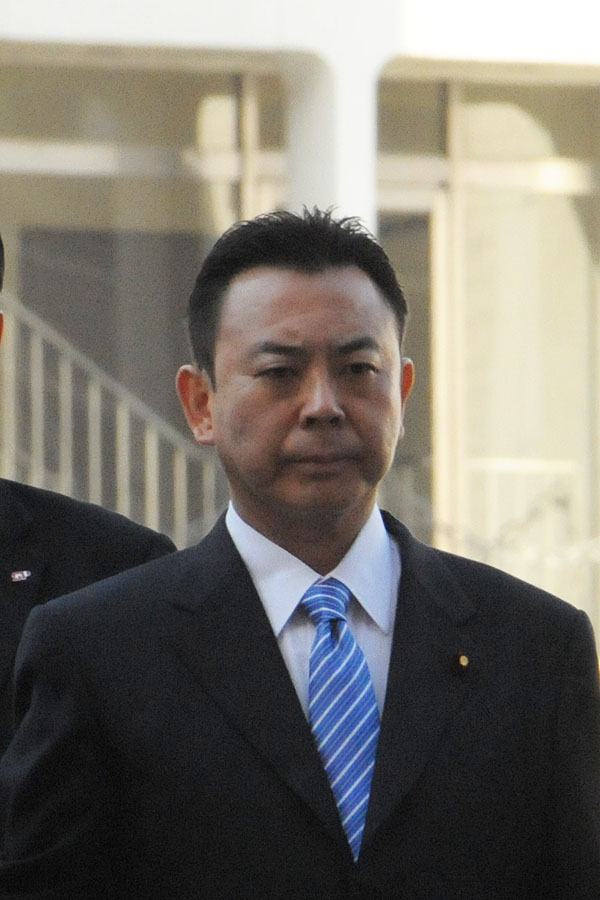

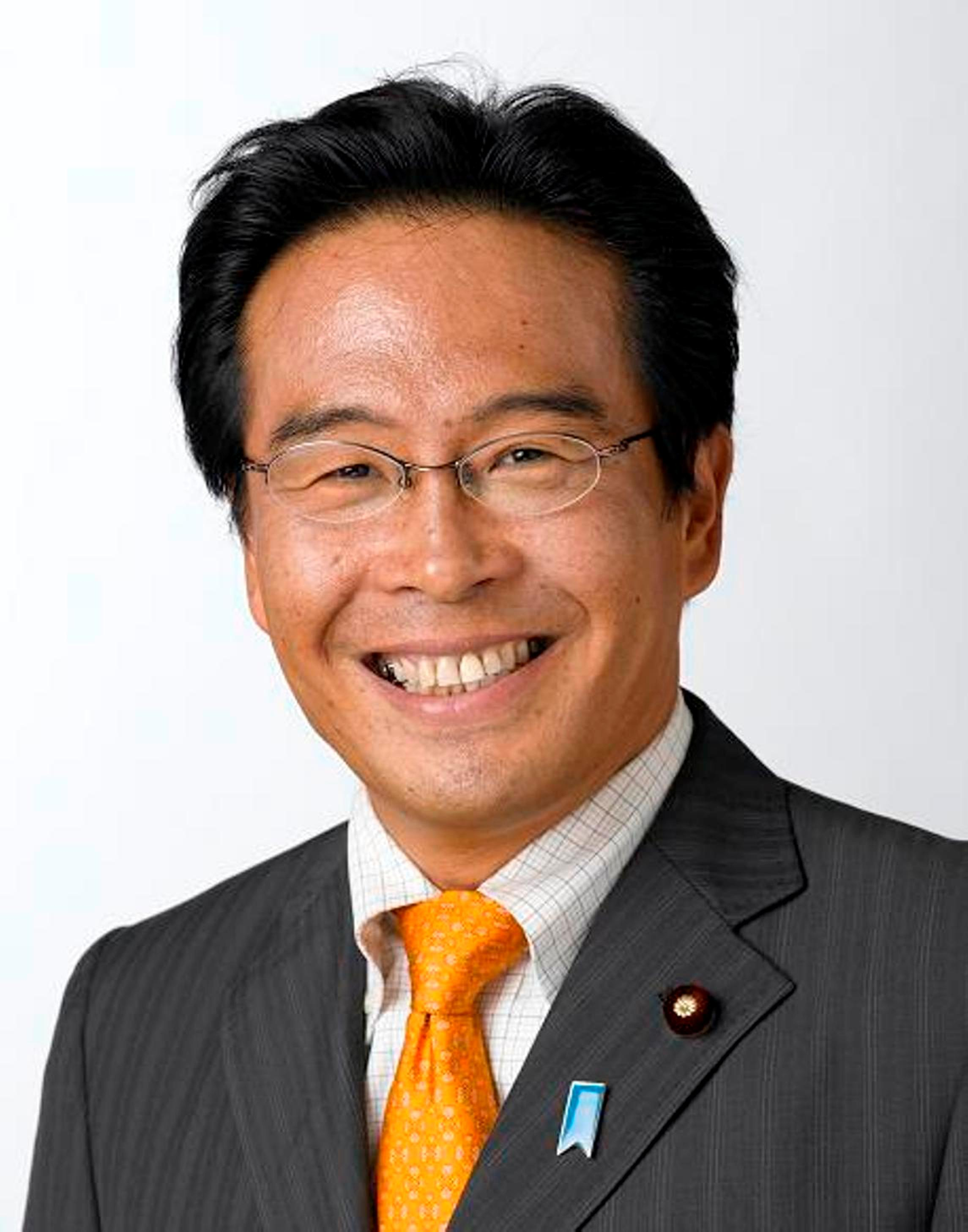
	First party	Second party	Third party
Leader	Yuriko Koike	Hakubun Shimomura	Yōsuke Takagi
Party	Tomin First	LDP	Komeito
Leader since	31 May 2017
Last election	New	59	23
Seats won	49	23	23
Seat change	▲49	▼36	0
Popular vote	1,884,029	1,260,101	734,697
Percentage	33.68%	22.53%	13.13%
Swing	New	▼13.51%	▼0.97%
	Fourth party	Fifth party	Sixth party
	共産		ネット
Leader	Yoshiharu Wakabayashi	Jin Matsubara	Mitsuko Nishizaki
Party	JCP	Democratic	Tokyo Seikatsusha Network
Last election	17	15	3
Seats won	19	5	1
Seat change	▲2	▼10	▼2
Popular vote	773,722	385,752	69,929
Percentage	13.83%	6.90%	1.25%
Swing	▲0.22%	▼8.34%	▼0.83%
	Seventh party
	維新
Leader	Takeshi Fujimaki
Party	Ishin
Last election	New
Seats won	1
Seat change	▲1
Popular vote	54,016
Percentage	0.97%
Swing	New

Assembly President before election
Shigeo Kawai
LDP
Elected Assembly President
Daisuke Ozaki
Tomin First

Prefectural elections for the Tokyo Metropolitan Assembly (平成29年/2017年東京都議会議員選挙, Heisei 29-nen/2017-nen Tōkyō togikai giin senkyo, "Heisei 29/2017 election of members of the Tokyo Metropolitan Assembly") were held on 2 July 2017. The 127 members were elected in forty-two electoral districts, seven returning single members elected by first-past-the-post, and thirty-five returning multiple members under single non-transferable vote. Four districts had their magnitude adjusted in this election to match population changes.

The results of the election persuaded Shinzo Abe to call a snap election, and led to the resignation of Renho as Democratic Party leader.

== Background ==
LDP leader Shinzo Abe took office as Prime Minister following the 2012 general election and strengthened his position in the 2014 general election. However, Abe's government was subsequently struck by criticism for its handling of the Moritomo Gakuen scandal and controversial remarks by Defense Minister Tomomi Inada. In the meantime, Yuriko Koike won the 2016 Tokyo gubernatorial election as an independent candidate, and left the LDP in June 2017 to found a new local political party, Tomin First, to challenge the LDP in the prefectural election. At the time of the election, Koike was widely believed to be eyeing a future bid to replace Abe as prime minister.

== Candidates ==
Incumbents (as of June 23) and candidates for the 2017 election
Party	Incumbents	Candidates				
Party	Incumbents	Incumbents	Previous representatives	New	Total	(Women)
Liberal Democratic Party (LDP)	57	49	0	11	60	(6)
Kōmeitō (Kōmei)	22	19	0	4	23	(3)
Japanese Communist Party (JCP)	17	11	1	25	37	(17)
Democratic Party (DP)	7	7	6	10	23	(6)
Tomin First no Kai (Tomin)	6	6	4	40	50	(17)
Tokyo Seikatsusha Network (Net)	3	2	0	2	4	(4)
Nippon Ishin no Kai (Ishin)	1	1	1	2	4	(1)
Social Democratic Party (SDP)	0	0	0	1	1	(1)
Other	0	0	1	16	17	(4)
Independent	13	11	4	25	40	(6)
Total	126 (1 vacancy)	106	17	136	259	(65)

== Results ==
With counting almost complete, the seat distribution was as follows:

- Supporters of Yuriko Koike won 79 seats in total: 49 by Tomin First no Kai, 23 by Kōmeitō, 1 by the Seikatsusha Net, and 6 by independents endorsed by Tomin;
- The LDP, previously the largest party, fell to 23 seats, their worst-ever result (their worst scores had previously been 38 seats, in the 1965 and 2009 elections);
- The Communist Party won 19 seats, improving further on their strong 2013 result;
- The DP was reduced to five seats and the single Ishin no Kai incumbent defended his seat.

Months after the Tokyo prefectural election, Abe called a snap general election for October 2017, and Koike established the new Kibo no To party to challenge the LDP nationally.

Party	Votes	%	Seats	+/–
Tomin First no Kai	1,884,029	33.68	49	+49
Liberal Democratic Party	1,260,101	22.53	23	–36
Komeito	734,697	13.13	23	0
Japanese Communist Party	773,723	13.83	19	+2
Democratic Party of Japan	385,752	6.90	5	–10
Tokyo Seikatsusha Network	69,929	1.25	1	–2
Nippon Ishin no Kai	54,016	0.97	1	+1
Social Democratic Party	13,243	0.24	0	0
Other parties	43,092	0.77	0	0
Independents	375,048	6.70	6	+5
Total	5,593,630	100.00	127	0
Registered voters/turnout	11,081,157	–		
Source: Tokyo Electoral Commission

=== By district ===
Winners and candidates by district and party
District	# of seats	Total candidates	Elected/Candidates^{Endorsements}									
District	# of seats	Total candidates	LDP	Kōmei	JCP	DP	Tomin	Net	Ishin	SDP	Other	Ind.
Chiyoda	1	4	0/1^{Kokoro}				1/1^{Kōmei}				0/1	0/1^{JCP}
Chūō	1	5	0/1^{Kokoro}				1/1^{Kōmei}				0/1	0/2^{1×JCP}
Minato	2	6	1/2^{Kokoro}		0/1		1/1^{Kōmei}				0/1	0/1^{Tomin}
Shinjuku	4	7	1/2^{Kokoro}	1/1^{Tomin}	1/1	0/1	1/1^{Net}					0/1
Bunkyō	2	3	1/1^{Kokoro}		0/1		1/1^{Kōmei}					
Taitō	2	5	0/1^{Kokoro}		0/1		1/1^{Kōmei}					1^{Kōmei&Tomin}/2
Sumida	3	5	1/2^{Kokoro}	1/1^{Tomin}	0/1		1/1					
Kōtō	4	9	1/2^{Kokoro}	1/1^{Tomin}	1/1	0/1	1/1				0/1	0/2^{1×Tomin}
Shinagawa	4	7	0/2^{Kokoro}	1/1^{Tomin}	1/1	0/1^{LP&Net}	2/2					
Meguro	3	5	0/2^{Kokoro}	1/1^{Tomin}	1/1		1/1^{Net}					
Ōta	8	15	2/3^{Kokoro}	2/2^{Tomin}	1/2	0/1^{LP&Net}	2/2		1/1		0/1	0/3
Setagaya	8	18	3/3^{Kokoro}	1/1^{Tomin}	1/1	1/1^{LP}	2/2	0/1^{DP}	0/1	0/1^{LP}	0/2	0/5
Shibuya	2	5	0/1^{Kokoro}		0/1	0/1^{LP}	1/1^{Kōmei}					1/1^{Kōmei&Tomin}
Nakano	3 (-1)	6	0/1^{Kokoro}	1/1^{Tomin}	0/1	1/1^{LP&Net}	1/1				0/1	
Suginami	6	12	2/2^{Kokoro}	1/1^{Tomin}	1/1	0/2^{LP}	2/2	0/1^{DP}			0/2	0/1
Toshima	3	5	0/1^{Kokoro}	1/1^{Tomin}	1/1	0/1^{LP}	1/1					
Kita	3 (-1)	5	0/1^{Kokoro}	1/1^{Tomin}	1/1^{LP}	0/1^{LP}	1/1					
Arakawa	2	7	0/1^{Kokoro}	1/1^{Tomin}	0/1						0/1	1^{Tomin}/3
Itabashi	5	10	0/2^{Kokoro}	1/1^{Tomin}	1/1	1/1^{LP&Net}	2/2				0/1	0/2
Nerima	6	10	1/2^{Kokoro}	1/1^{Tomin}	1/1	1/2^{LP}	2/2	0/1^{DP}			0/1	
Adachi	6	9	1/2^{Kokoro}	2/2^{Tomin}	1/1	0/1^{LP}	2/2^{1×Net}		0/1			
Katsushika	4	8	1/2^{Kokoro}	1/1^{Tomin}	1/1	0/1^{LP&Net}	1/1				0/2	
Edogawa	5	6	1/2^{Kokoro}	1/1^{Tomin}	1/1		2/2					
Hachiōji	5	9	1/2^{Kokoro}	1/1^{Tomin}	1/1	0/1^{LP&Net}	2/2				0/1	0/1
Tachikawa	2	4	1/1^{Kokoro}		0/1		1/1^{Kōmei}					0/1^{Tomin}
Musashino	1	3	0/1^{Kokoro}			0/1^{LP&Net}	1/1^{Kōmei}					
Mitaka	2	4	0/1^{Kokoro}		0/1	1/1^{LP&Net}	1/1^{Kōmei}					
Ōme	1	3	0/1^{Kokoro}				1/1^{Kōmei&Net}					0/1^{JCP}
Fuchū	2	4	0/1^{Kokoro}		0/1		2/2^{Kōmei&1×Net}					
Akishima	1	3	0/1^{Kokoro}		0/1		1/1^{Kōmei&Net}					
Machida	4 (+1)	8	1/2^{Kokoro}	1/1^{Tomin}	1/1	0/1^{LP&Net}	1/1		0/1		0/1	
Koganei	1	5	0/1^{Kokoro}				1/1^{Kōmei}					0/3^{1×JCP}
Kodaira	2	4	1/1^{Kokoro}		0/1	0/1^{LP&Net}	1/1^{Kōmei}					
Hino	2	4	1/1^{Kokoro}		0/1		1/1^{Kōmei&Net}					0/1
Nishi-Tōkyō	2	4	0/1^{Kokoro}		0/1		1/1^{Kōmei}					1/1^{Tomin}
Nishi-Tama	2	4	1/1^{Kokoro}		0/1		1/1^{Kōmei&Net}					0/1^{Tomin&Net}
Minami-Tama	2	5	0/1^{Kokoro}		0/1		1/1^{Kōmei&Net}					1^{Tomin}/2
Kita-Tama 1	3	6	0/1^{Kokoro}	1/1^{Tomin}	1/1	0/1^{LP}	1/1					0/1
Kita-Tama 2	2	4	0/1^{Kokoro}			0/1^{LP}	1/1^{Kōmei}	1/1^{JCP, DP, Tomin}				
Kita-Tama 3	3 (+1)	6	0/1^{Kokoro}	1/1^{Tomin}	1/1							1^{Tomin&Net}/3
Kita-Tama 4	2	4	0/1^{Kokoro}		1/1		1/1^{Kōmei}					0/1^{Tomin&Net}
Islands	1	3	1/1^{Kokoro}		0/1		0/1^{Kōmei}					
Total	127	259	23/60	23/23	19/37	5/23	49/50	1/4	1/4	0/1	0/17	6^{Tomin}/40

Most districts are coterminous with a municipality (-ku/-shi/-chō/-son) of the same name. The following districts comprise multiple municipalities:

- Nishi-Tama ("West Tama“; follows the original boundaries of the district of the same name, except Ōme): Fussa, Hamura, Akiruno, Hinohara, Hinode, Mizuho, Okutama
- Minami-Tama ("South Tama“; follows the boundaries of the former district of the same name): Tama, Inagi
- Kita-Tama dai-1 ("North Tama #1“; follows the boundaries of the former Kitatama district): Higashi-Murayama, Higashi-Yamato, Musashi-Murayama
- Kita-Tama dai-2 ("North Tama #2“): Kokubunji, Kunitachi
- Kita-Tama dai-3 ("North Tama #3“): Chōfu, Komae
- Kita-Tama dai-4 ("North Tama #4“): Kiyose, Higashi-Kurume
- Islands: Aogashima, Hachijō, Mikurajima, Miyake, Ogasawara, Kōzushima, Niijima, Ōshima, Toshima

== Same-day elections ==
On the same day, the mayoral election in Kokubunji, Tokyo returned incumbent Kunio Izawa, backed by LDP and Komeito, against center-left supported (DP, JCP, LP, SDP, Net) former deputy mayor Michio Higuchi. Another prefectural election on July 2 was the gubernatorial election in Hyōgo.
