= Kōichi Hagiuda =

Japanese politician

- 萩生田 光一
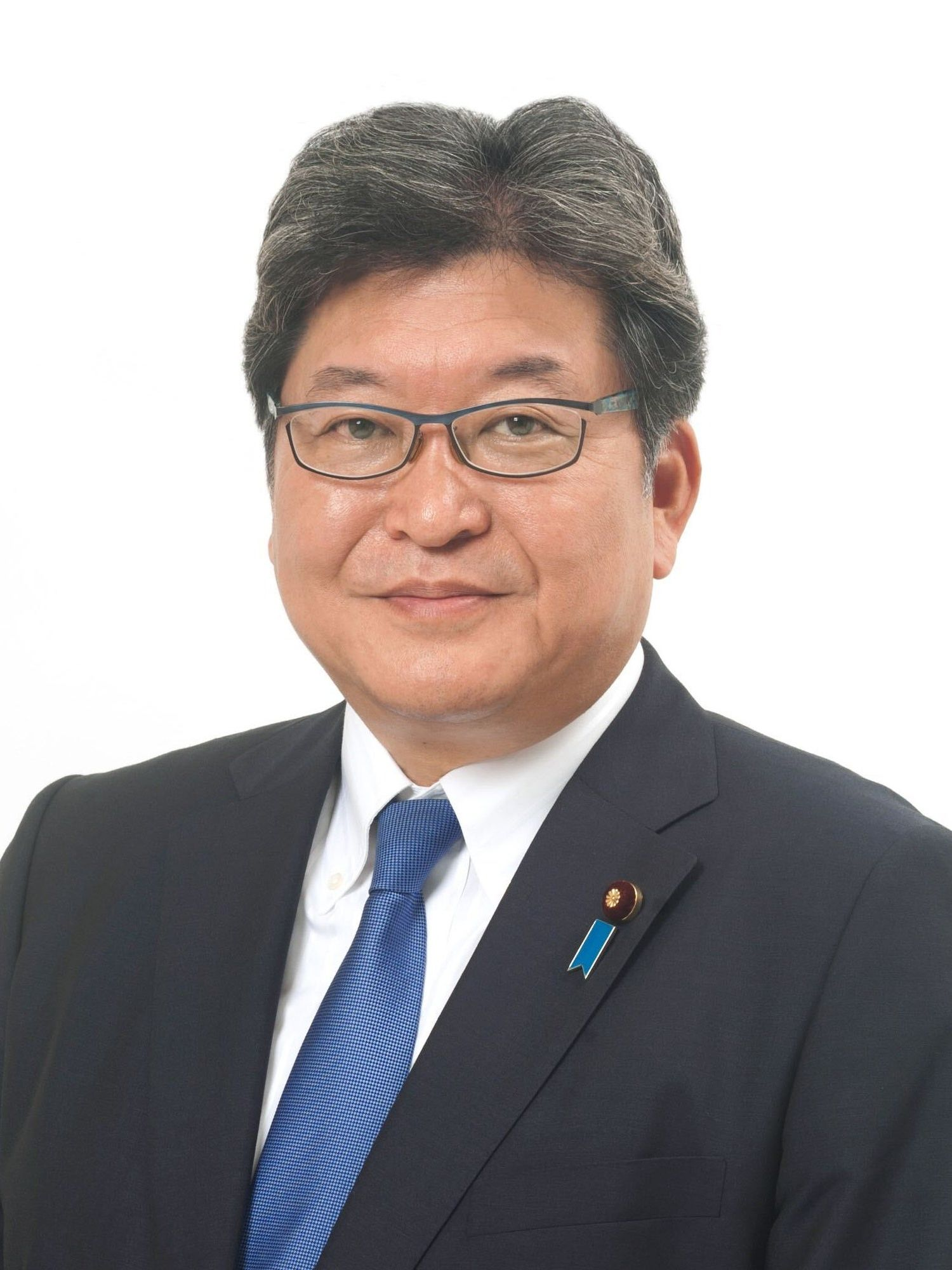
- Official portrait, 2021

Minister of Economy, Trade and Industry
- In office 4 October 2021 – 10 August 2022
- Prime Minister: Fumio Kishida
- Preceded by: Hiroshi Kajiyama
- Succeeded by: Yasutoshi Nishimura

Minister of Education, Culture, Sports, Science and Technology
- In office 11 September 2019 – 4 October 2021
- Prime Minister: Shinzo Abe; Yoshihide Suga
- Preceded by: Masahiko Shibayama
- Succeeded by: Shinsuke Suematsu

Deputy Chief Cabinet Secretary (Political affairs, House of Representatives)
- In office 7 October 2015 – 3 August 2017
- Prime Minister: Shinzo Abe
- Preceded by: Katsunobu Katō
- Succeeded by: Yasutoshi Nishimura

Member of the House of Representatives
- Incumbent
- Assumed office 18 December 2012
- Preceded by: Yukihiko Akutsu
- Constituency: Tokyo 24th
- In office 10 November 2003 – 21 July 2009
- Preceded by: Yukihiko Akutsu
- Succeeded by: Yukihiko Akutsu
- Constituency: Tokyo 24th

Member of the Tokyo Metropolitan Assembly
- In office 23 July 2001 – 2003
- Constituency: Hachiōji City

Member of the Hachioji City Assembly
- In office 1 May 1991 – 5 June 2001

Personal details
- Born: 31 August 1963 (age 63) Hachiōji, Tokyo, Japan
- Party: Liberal Democratic
- Education: Meiji University

Kōichi Hagiuda (萩生田 光一, Hagiuda Kōichi; born 31 August 1963) is a Japanese politician of Liberal Democratic Party who currently serves as executive acting secretary-general of the LDP, He previously served as Minister of Economy, Trade and Industry, and was Deputy Chief Cabinet Secretary from 2015 to 2016 and Minister of Education, Culture, Sports, Science and Technology from 2019 to 2021.

== Background and education ==
Born and raised in Hachiōji, Hagiuda graduated from Waseda Jitsugyo High School, and Meiji University with a Bachelor of Commerce degree in 1987.

While still a university student, Hagiuda had become an aide to the Hachiōji city councilman Ryuichi Kurosu. In 1991, at the age of 27, Hagiuda himself was elected the Hachiōji City Council, becoming the youngest candidate ever elected to the council. Kurosu was elected to the Tokyo Metropolitan Assembly in 1993, but resigned in 2000 to run for Mayor of Hachiōji. Hagiuda was elected to his vacated seat in the Metropolitan Assembly. He then ran in the 2005 general election for the Liberal Democratic Party and was elected to the House of Representatives for the first time.

== Diet member ==
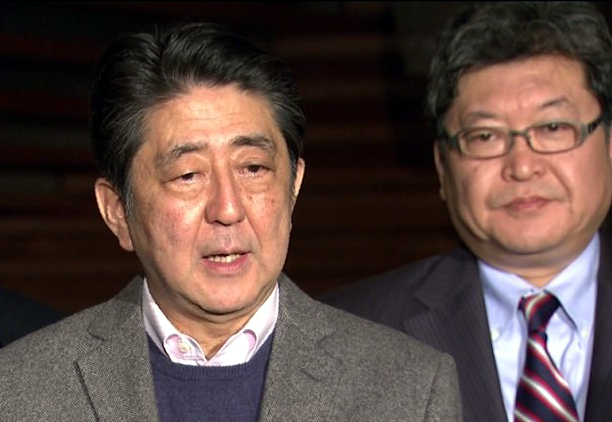
Hagiuda with Shinzo Abe (at the Prime Minister's Official Residence on 28 January 2017)

Hagiuda joined the Seiwa Seisaku Kenkyukai within the LDP. A conservative, he became known as one of Shinzō Abe's closest aides and personal friends. He also became close to former Prime Minister Yoshiro Mori. He lost his seat in the 2009 general election, but returned in the 2012 general election.

Hagiuda was appointed Deputy Chief Cabinet Secretary in 2015. In 2017 he was made Executive Acting Secretary General of the LDP, an exceptional appointment since it was usually only been given to former cabinet ministers. In 2019 he joined the cabinet for the first time as Minister of Education, Culture, Sports, Science and Technology. He remained in this post under Yoshihide Suga. When Fumio Kishida became prime minister in 2021 he became Minister of Economy, Trade and Industry.

As a protégé of Shinzo Abe and a long-standing member of the ultranationalist lobby group Nippon Kaigi, Hagiuda has consistently advocated for policies aimed at strengthening Japan's military capabilities and revising Article 9 of the constitution.

Following the assassination of Shinzo Abe, ties between Diet members and Unification Church came under scrutiny. Hagiuda was one of those alleged to have close ties to the group. An anonymous source claimed in a tabloid that Hagiuda had made regular visits to the Church in Hachioji during his time out of office from 2009 to 2012 and was "like one of the family." Hagiuda disputed these statements but admitted he had made speeches at affiliated organisations.

When Kishida reshuffled the cabinet and party leadership in August 2022, Hagiuda was appointed Chairman of the Policy Research Council for the LDP.

In December 2023, he resigned as Chairman of the Policy Research Council amid a financial scandal involving the Liberal Democratic Party.

As secretary-general of the Japan-ROC Diet Members' Consultative Council, a cross-party group promoting relations between Japan and Taiwan, Hagiuda led a LDP delegation to Taipei in December 2025, during the 2025 China–Japan diplomatic crisis. Hagiuda met with Taiwanese President Lai Ching-te, declaring that Japan-Taiwan relations were "the best in history." He pledged to deepen collaboration on national security and critical technologies like semiconductors. The visit was firmly opposed by China.

== Personal life ==
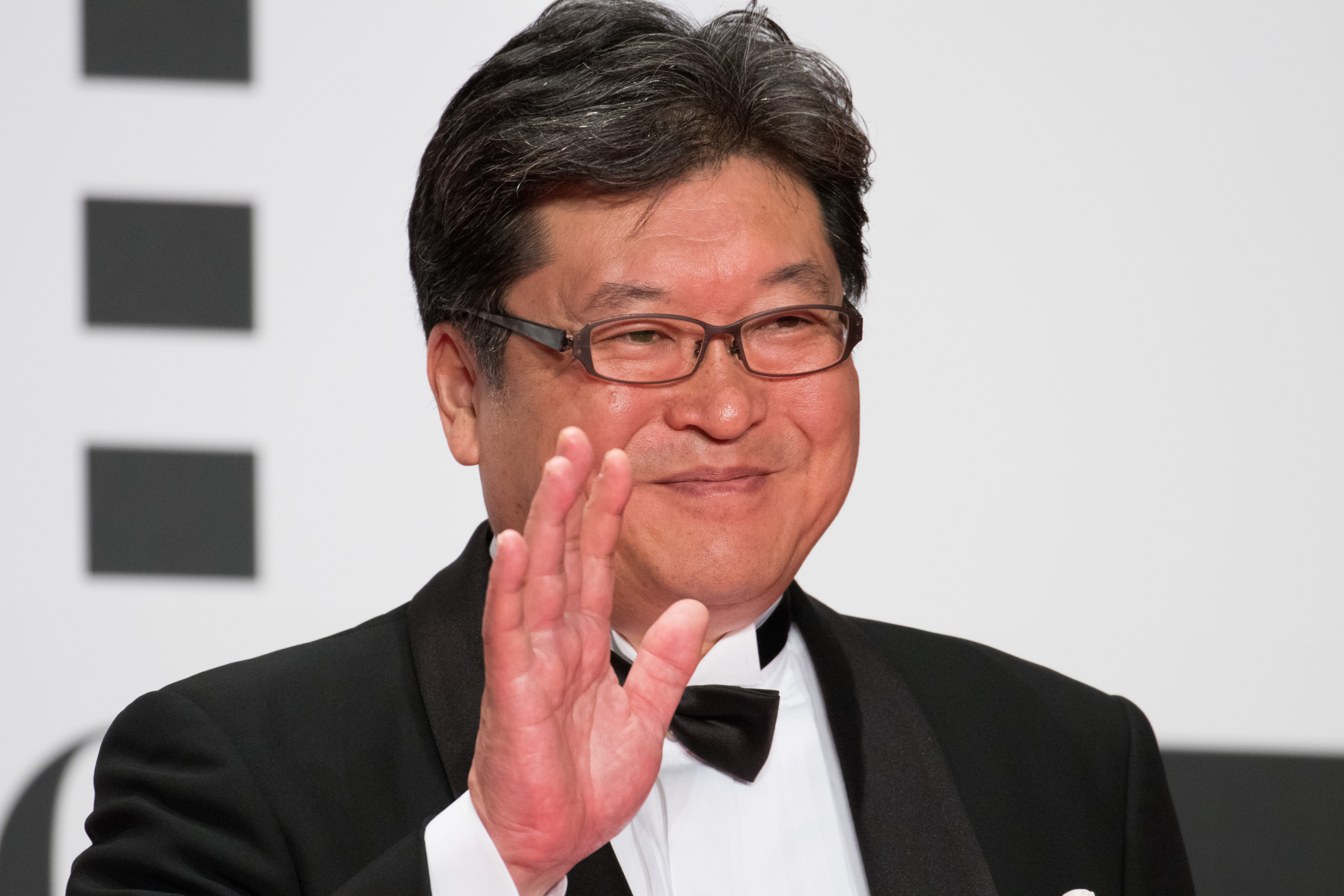
Hagiuda at the Opening Ceremony of Tokyo International Film Festival (25 October 2016)

Hagiuda is married, and has one daughter and one son. His hobbies include sports such as baseball, rugby, and golf. He also enjoys watching movies, holding movie-viewing events annually in conjunction with his personal support group, or koenkai. His personal website also lists "trying new restaurants" as a hobby, calling him a "self-proclaimed gourmet", and also mentions his frequent enjoyment of after-meal ramen.

Political offices
Preceded by Katsunobu Katō	Deputy Chief Cabinet Secretary (Political affairs, House of Representatives); 2015–2017	Succeeded by Yasutoshi Nishimura
Preceded by Masahiko Shibayama	Minister of Education, Culture, Sports, Science and Technology; 2019–2021	Succeeded by Shinsuke Suematsu
Preceded by Hiroshi Kajiyama	Minister of Economy, Trade and Industry; 2021–2022	Succeeded by Yasutoshi Nishimura
Party political offices
Liberal Democratic Party
Preceded by Tatsuya Tanimoto	Director of the Youth Division; 2006–2007	Succeeded by Shinji Inoue
Preceded by Hakubun Shimomura	Executive Deputy Secretary General; 2017–2019	Succeeded by Tomomi Inada
Preceded by Sanae Takaichi	Chairman of the Policy Research Council; 2022-2023	Succeeded by Kisaburo Tokai
Preceded by Tatsuo Fukuda	Executive Deputy Secretary General; 2025–present	Incumbent
