= Tokyo 18th district =

Japan House of Representatives constituency

Tokyo 18th District
- 東京都第18区
- Parliamentary constituency for the Japanese House of Representatives
- Numbered map of Tokyo single-member districts
- Prefecture: Tokyo
- Proportional District: Tokyo
- Electorate: 444,924 (2021)

Current constituency
- Created: 1994
- Seats: One
- Party: Liberal Democratic Party
- Representative: Kaoru Fukuda
- Created from: Tokyo's 7th "medium-sized" district
- Municipalities: Musashino, Koganei and Nishitokyo

Tokyo 18th District (東京都第18区, Tōkyō-tō dai-jūhachi-ku; or 東京18区 Tōkyō jūhachi-ku) is a constituency of the House of Representatives in the Diet of Japan. It is located in Western Tokyo and consists of the cities of Musashino, Koganei and, since 2022 Nishitokyo. Musashino and Koganei have been a part of the district from its creation, but between 2002 and 2022 it also included Fuchū, and before 2002 it included Mitaka. Before the electoral reform of 1994, the area had been part of Tokyo 7th district, where four representatives were elected by Single non-transferable vote (SNTV).

From its creation to 2012, the district was represented by former Prime Minister and popular Democratic Party co-founder Naoto Kan. In the election of 2005 it was the only constituency the opposition could defend in Tokyo against the landslide for Junichiro Koizumi's ruling coalition. In 2003, then party chairman Kan beat former Minister of Labour Kunio Hatoyama, the younger brother of Democratic Party leader Yukio Hatoyama by a margin of more than 50,000 votes.

In the election of 2009, Masatada Tsuchiya was the candidate for the ruling LDP. Tsuchiya who failed to unseat Kan in 2005 was a representative for the Tokyo proportional representation block where he ranked second on the LDP's list 2005. In 2009 he failed to secure reelection in the Tokyo block. Kan was elected president of the then ruling Democratic Party again in 2010 shortly before the 2010 House of Councillors election; but his cabinet resigned after only 15 months. In the 2012 House of Representatives election, Kan lost Tokyo 18th district to Masatada Tsuchiya by more than 10,000 votes; ranking third on the Democratic proportional list in Tokyo (sekihairitsu 87.9%), he gained the last of the three Democratic seats in the Tokyo proportional block behind Banri Kaieda and Jin Matsubara.

Kan joined the Constitutional Democratic Party of Japan before the 2017 general election and regained the seat. Tsuchiya lost his seat even with his high sekihairitsu as he did not run for the proportional block. In 2021 Kan was challenged by a former DPJ lawmaker, Akihisa Nagashima, who had joined the LDP. Kan managed to hold his seat in a tight race that received national attention.

== List of representatives ==
| Representative | Party | Dates | Notes |
|---|---|---|---|
| Naoto Kan | DPJ | 1996 – 2012 | Re-elected in the Tokyo PR block |
| Masatada Tsuchiya | LDP | 2012 – 2017 | |
| Naoto Kan | CDP | 2017 – 2024 | |
| Kaoru Fukuda | LDP | 2024 – | Incumbent |

== Election results ==
2026
| Party | Candidate | Votes | % | ±% |
|---|---|---|---|---|
| LDP | Kaoru Fukuda | 117,383 | 47.7 | ▲5.4 |
| Centrist Reform | Reiko Matsushita | 69,722 | 28.3 | ▼13.1 |
| DPP | Yūma Suzuki | 33,497 | 13.6 | |
| Sanseitō | Yukiko Tokunaga | 17,121 | 7.0 | ▼1.3 |
| Saisei no Michi | Aya Yoshida | 8,330 | 3.4 | |
| Turnout | | | 62.79 | ▲2.66 |
| Registered electors | | 399,639 | | |
| LDP hold | | | | |

2024
| Party | Candidate | Votes | % | ±% |
|---|---|---|---|---|
| LDP | Kaoru Fukuda | 99,002 | 42.34 | ▼2.38 |
| CDP | Reiko Matsushita (elected by PR) | 96,820 | 41.41 | ▼5.71 |
| Sanseitō | Yukiko Tokunaga | 19,496 | 8.34 | N/A |
| JCP | Makoto Higuchi | 18,512 | 7.92 | N/A |
| Majority | | 2,182 | 0.93 | ▼1.96 |
| Turnout | | 233,830 | 60.13 | ▼1.47 |
| LDP gain from CDP | | | | |

2021
| Party | Candidate | Votes | % | ±% |
|---|---|---|---|---|
| CDP | Naoto Kan | 122,091 | 47.12 | ▲6.39 |
| LDP | Akihisa Nagashima (elected by PR) | 115,881 | 44.72 | ▲4.43 |
| Independent | Masami Koyasu | 21,151 | 8.16 | |
| Majority | | 6,210 | 2.40 | ▲1.96 |
| Turnout | | | 59.86 | ▲4.03 |
| CDP hold | | Swing | 0.98 | |

2017
| Party | Candidate | Votes | % | ±% |
|---|---|---|---|---|
| CDP | Naoto Kan | 96,713 | 40.73 | ▲1.94 |
| LDP | Masatada Tsuchiya | 95,667 | 40.29 | ▼5.50 |
| Kibō no Tō | Atsushi Tokita | 45,081 | 18.98 | N/A |
| Majority | | 1,046 | 0.44 | ▼6.76 |
| Turnout | | | 55.83 | ▼1.60 |
| CDP gain from LDP | | Swing | ▲3.72 | |

2014
| Party | Candidate | Votes | % | ±% |
|---|---|---|---|---|
| LDP | Masatada Tsuchiya | 106,143 | 45.81 | ▲13.59 |
| Democratic | Naoto Kan (elected by PR) | 89,877 | 38.79 | ▲10.46 |
| JCP | Ryo Yuuki | 35,699 | 15.41 | ▲10.27 |
| Majority | | 16,266 | 7.02 | ▲3.13 |
| Turnout | | | 57.43 | ▼7.59 |
| LDP hold | | Swing | ▲1.57 | |

2012
| Party | Candidate | Votes | % | ±% |
|---|---|---|---|---|
| LDP | Masatada Tsuchiya | 84,078 | 32.22 | ▲0.09 |
| Democratic | Naoto Kan (elected by PR) | 73,942 | 28.33 | ▼31.13 |
| Independent | Katsuhito Yokokume | 44,828 | 17.18 | N/A |
| Restoration | Katsuya Igarashi | 28,837 | 11.05 | N/A |
| Tomorrow | Yasuyuki Sugimura | 15,873 | 6.08 | N/A |
| JCP | Takayoshi Yanagi | 13,419 | 5.14 | ▼2.50 |
| Majority | | 10,136 | 3.89 | ▼23.44 |
| Turnout | | | 65.02 | ▼3.22 |
| LDP gain from Democratic | | Swing | ▲15.61 | |

2009
| Party | Candidate | Votes | % | ±% |
|---|---|---|---|---|
| Democratic | Naoto Kan | 163,446 | 59.46 | ▲12.69 |
| LDP | Masatada Tsuchiya | 88,325 | 32.13 | ▼11.75 |
| JCP | Tamiji Koizumi | 21,004 | 7.64 | ▼0.31 |
| Happiness Realization | Michie Tanabe | 2,087 | 0.76 | ▲0.76 |
| Majority | | 75,121 | 27.33 | ▲24.44 |
| Turnout | | 274,862 | 68.24 | ▲0.20 |
| Democratic hold | | Swing | ▲12.22 | |

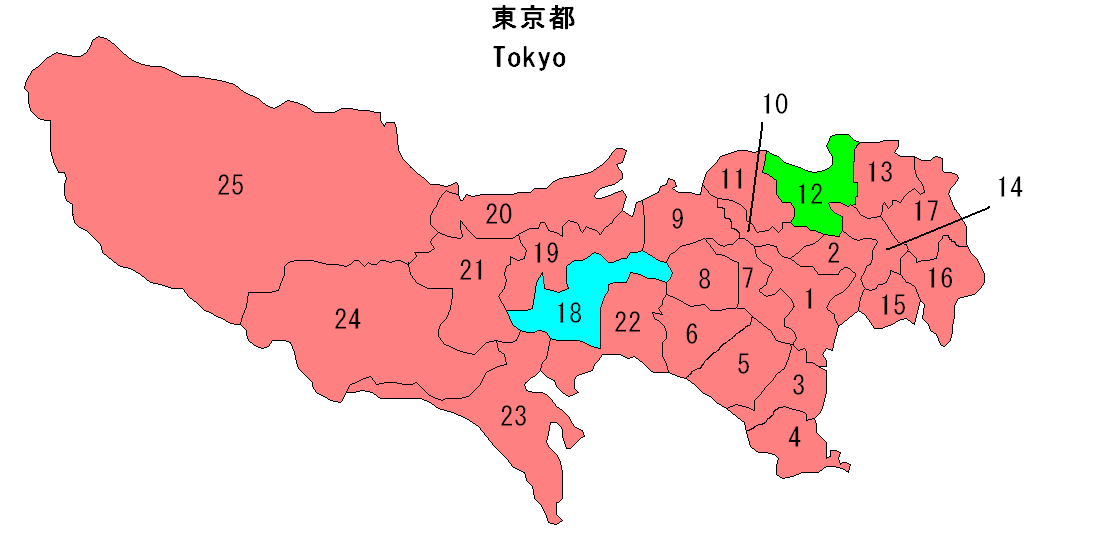
In 2005, the ruling coalition of LDP (red) and Kōmeitō (green) swept Tokyo's single-member districts. The opposition DPJ (blue) was reduced to one district, down from 12 in 2003.

2005
| Party | Candidate | Votes | % | ±% |
|---|---|---|---|---|
| Democratic | Naoto Kan | 126,716 | 46.77 | |
| LDP | Masatada Tsuchiya (elected by PR) | 118,879 | 43.88 | |
| JCP | Tōru Miyamoto | 21,542 | 7.95 | |
| Turnout | | 270,949 | 68.04 | |

2003
| Party | Candidate | Votes | % | ±% |
|---|---|---|---|---|
| Democratic | Naoto Kan | 139,195 | 57.36 | |
| LDP | Kunio Hatoyama (elected by PR) | 83,337 | 34.34 | |
| JCP | Motonari Kobayama | 16,010 | 6.60 | |
| Turnout | | 242,652 | 62.38 | |

2000
| Party | Candidate | Votes | % | ±% |
|---|---|---|---|---|
| Democratic | Naoto Kan | 114,750 | | |
| LDP | Hisanori Kataoka | 49,740 | | |
| JCP | Sadahiko Toda | 21,900 | | |
| Liberal | Takashi Kanamori | 16,467 | | |
| Liberal League | Yū Kaneko | 1,521 | | |

1996
| Party | Candidate | Votes | % | ±% |
|---|---|---|---|---|
| Democratic | Naoto Kan | 116,910 | | |
| New Frontier | Takashi Kanamori | 24,245 | | |
| LDP | Chikara Ōkubo | 23,566 | | |
| JCP | Sadahiko Toda | 22,488 | | |

House of Representatives (Japan)
| Preceded by Hokkaido 9th district | Constituency represented by the prime minister 2010–2011 | Succeeded by Chiba 4th district |
