= Tsuchiya =

Tsuchiya (written: 土屋 or 土谷) is a Japanese surname. Notable people with the surname include:

- Anna Tsuchiya (土屋 アンナ; born 1984), Japanese-American singer, actress and model
- Eriko Tsuchiya (土屋 恵理子; born 1970), better known as Shark Tsuchiya, Japanese professional wrestler
- Garon Tsuchiya (土屋 ガロン; born 1947), Japanese manga artist
- Haruhiko Tsuchiya, Japanese engineer
- Keiichi Tsuchiya (土屋 圭市; born 1956), Japanese racing driver
- Kenji Tsuchiya (土屋 健二; born 1990), Japanese baseball player
- Masami Tsuchiya (土屋 昌巳), Japanese singer-songwriter and musician
- Tsuchiya Masanao (土屋 政直; 1641–1722), Japanese daimyō
- Masatada Tsuchiya (土屋 正忠), Japanese politician
- Tsuchiya Masatsugu (土屋 昌次; 1544–1575), Japanese samurai
- Tsuchiya Mitsuharu (土屋 光春; 1848–1920), Japanese general
- Nobuko Tsuchiya (土屋 信子), Japanese artist
- Ryousuke Tsuchiya (土屋 良輔; born 1994), Japanese speed skater
- Shinako Tsuchiya (土屋 品子; born 1952), Japanese politician
- Shimba Tsuchiya (土屋 神葉; born 1996), Japanese actor and voice actor
- Tao Tsuchiya (土屋 太鳳; born 1995), Japanese actress, model and dancer
- Teppei Tsuchiya (土谷 鉄平; born 1982), Japanese baseball player
- Tilsa Tsuchiya (1928–1984), Peruvian artist
- Tokachi Tsuchiya (土屋 トカチ), Japanese film director
- Tokizō Tsuchiya (土屋 登喜蔵), Japanese television producer and planning director
- Tom Tsuchiya (born 1972), American sculptor
- Toyo Tsuchiya, Japanese artist and photographer
- Yoshio Tsuchiya (土屋 嘉男; 1927–2017), Japanese actor
- Yuichi Tsuchiya (土屋 裕一; born 1979), Japanese actor
- Yukio Tsuchiya (土屋 征夫; born 1974), Japanese footballer
- Yutaka Tsuchiya (土屋 豊; born 1966), Japanese filmmaker
- Kunio Tsuchiya, a designer for the company Frances May

== See also ==
- Tsuchiya clan
