= Tokyo 11th district =

Japanese House of Representatives constituency

Tokyo 11th District
- Parliamentary constituency for the Japanese House of Representatives
- Numbered map of inner Tokyo single-member districts
- Prefecture: Tokyo
- Proportional Block: Tokyo
- Electorate: 388,347

Current constituency
- Created: 1994
- Seats: One
- Party: LDP
- Representative: Hakubun Shimomura
- Created from: Former Tokyo 1st district
- Wards: Parts of Itabashi

Tokyo's 11th district is an electoral district of the House of Representatives, the lower house of Japan's National Diet. The district was established in 1994 as part of the move to single-member districts. From the first election in 1996 until 2024 it was held by the Liberal Democratic Party's Hakubun Shimomura. In the 2024 Japanese general election Shimomura, former Minister of Education was not endorsed by the LDP because of involvement in the 2023–2024 Japanese slush fund scandal and ran as an independent candidate.

== Areas covered ==
=== Current district ===
As of 18 January 2023, the areas covered by this district are as follows:

- Parts of Itabashi
  - Parts of the Central Ward jurisdiction
    - Itabashi 1–4, Kaga 1–2, Oyama Higashi, Oyamakanai, Kumano, Nakamaru, Minami, Inaridai, Nakajuku, Hikawa, Sakae, Oyama, Oyama Nishi, Saiwai, Nakaitabashi, Naka, Yayoi, Hon, Yamato, Futaba, Fujimi, Otaniguchi Kami, Otaniguchi Kita, Otaniguchi 1/2, Mukaihara 1–3, Komone 1–5, Tokiwadai 1–4, Minami Tokiwadai 1/2, Higashishin 1/2, Kamiitabashi 1–3, Shimizu, Hasunuma, Ohara, Izumi, Miyamoto, Shimura 1–3, Sakashita 1 1-26/28, Higashisakashita 1, Azusawa 1–4, Nishidai 1, Nishidai 2 (excluding 30-5-16 and 31–40), Nishidai 3 (excluding 47-55-57), Nishidai 4, Nakadai 1–3, Wakaki 1–3, Maeno 1–6, Misono 2, Higashiyama, Sakuragawa 1-3
  - Parts of the former village of Akatsuka
    - Nishidai 2 (30-5-16, 31–40) and 3 (47, 55, 57), Tokumaru 1–8, Yotsuba 1–2, Daimon, Akatsuka 1–8, Akatsuka Shin 1–3, Narimasu 1–5, Misono 1

=== Areas from 2017-2022 ===
From the first redistricting

- Parts of Itabashi
  - Parts of the central ward jurisdiction
    - Itabashi 1–4, Kaga 1–2, Oyama Higashi, Oyama Kanai, Kumano, Nakamura, Minami, Tokyo, Inaridai, Nakajuku, Hikawa, Sakae, Oyama, Oyama Nishi, Saiwai, Nakaitabashi, Naka, Yayoi, Hon, Yamato, Futaba, Fujimi, Otaniguchi Kami, Otaniguchi Kita, Otaniguchi 1/2, Mukaihara 1–3, Komone 1–5, Tokiwadai 1–4, Minami Tokiwadai 1/2, Higashishin 1/2, Kamiitabashi 1–3, Shimizu, Hasunuma, Ohara, Izumi, Miyamoto, Shimura 1–3, Sakashita 1 (1-26, 28), Higashisakashita 1, Azusawa 1–4, Nishidai 1, Nishidai 2 (excluding 30-5-16 and 31–40), Nishidai 3 (excluding 47-55-57), Nishidai 4, Nakadai 1–3, Wakaki 1–3, Maeno 1–6, Misono 2, Higashiyama, Sakuragawa 1–3, Takashimadaira 1–9, Shingashi 3

== List of representatives ==
Representative	Party	Dates	Notes
Hakubun Shimomura	LDP	1996 – 2024	Minister of Education, Culture, Sports, Science and Technology (2012–2015)
Yukihiko Akutsu	CDP	2024 – 2026	Former incumbent in Tokyo 24th district
Hakubun Shimomura	LDP	2026 –	

== Election results ==
‡ - Also ran in the Tokyo PR district

‡‡ - Also ran and won in the Tokyo PR district

=== Elections in the 2020s ===
2026
Party	Candidate	Votes	%	±%
LDP	Hakubun Shimomura^{‡}	69,077	31.5	▲2.5
Centrist Reform	Yukihiko Akutsu^{‡}	80,947	24.2	▼16.8
DPP	Kazumoto Takazawa^{‡‡} (elected in Tokyo PR)	38,445	17.5	
Ishin	Minoru Oomamiuda^{‡}	26,207	11.9	▼4.9
Sanseitō	Emi Matsukata	19,149	8.7	
JCP	Kaito Yokote	12,590	5.7	▼3.2
Nuclear Fusion	Yasufumi Kuwajima	916	0.4	
Registered electors		390,467		
Turnout			57.45	▲3.47
LDP gain from Centrist Reform				

2024
Party	Candidate	Votes	%	±%
CDP	Yukihiko Akutsu^{‡}	80,947	41.0	▲5.2
Independent	Hakubun Shimomura	57,275	29.0	
Ishin	Minoru Oomamiuda^{‡}	33,103	16.8	New
JCP	Masanori Iha	17,607	8.9	▼3.1
Independent	Takayuki Saitō	8,316	4.2	
Registered electors		388,893		
Turnout			53.98	▼0.99
CDP gain from LDP				

2021
Party	Candidate	Votes	%	±%
LDP	Hakubun Shimomura^{‡} (incumbent) (endorsed by Komeito)	122,465	50.0	▲5.1
CDP	Yukihiko Akutsu^{‡} (endorsed by the SDP)	87,635	35.8	▲9.9
JCP	Shoto Nishinohara	29,304	12.0	▲1.1
Independent	Yasufumi Kuwashima	5,639	2.3	New
Registered electors		462,626		
Majority		34,830	14.2	▼4.8
Turnout		254,306	55.0	▲2.3
LDP hold		Swing	▲8.2	

=== Elections in the 2010s ===
2017
Party	Candidate	Votes	%	±%
LDP	Hakubun Shimomura^{‡} (incumbent) (endorsed by Komeito)	104,612	44.9	▼11.2
CDP	Junichiro Maeda^{‡}	60,291	25.9	New
Kibō no Tō	Chie Shishido^{‡}	42,668	18.3	New
JCP	Kozue Higashi	25,426	10.9	▼7.7
Registered electors		454,255		
Majority		44,321	19.0	▼18.5
Turnout		239,211	52.7	▲0.8
LDP hold		Swing	▼10.9	

2014
Party	Candidate	Votes	%	±%
LDP	Hakubun Shimomura^{‡} (incumbent) (endorsed by Komeito)	129,587	56.1	▲10.6
JCP	Kanekyu Yamauchi	43,083	18.6	▲7.8
Democratic	Minako Kumaki	43,040	18.6	▲4.5
Independent	Mei Shimomura	15,447	6.7	New
Registered electors		446,555		
Majority		86,504	37.5	▲11.3
Turnout		239,086	53.5	▼6.7
LDP hold		Swing	▲6.9	

2012
Party	Candidate	Votes	%	±%
LDP	Hakubun Shimomura^{‡} (incumbent) (endorsed by Komeito)	116,521	45.5	▲3.1
Restoration	Takashi Ino^{‡} (endorsed by Your Party)	49,334	19.3	New
Democratic	Junko Ota^{‡} (endorsed by the PNP)	36,144	14.1	New
JCP	Takemi Sudo	27,726	10.8	▼2.4
Tomorrow	Kumi Hashimoto^{‡} (endorsed by the NPD)	26,469	10.3	New
Registered electors		442,124		
Majority		67,187	26.2	▲24.9
Turnout		266,026	60.2	▼4.8
LDP hold		Swing	▲7.9	

=== Elections in the 2000s ===
2009
Party	Candidate	Votes	%	±%
LDP	Hakubun Shimomura^{‡} (incumbent)	117.472	42.4	▼12.6
NP-Nippon	Yoshio Arita^{‡} (endorsed by the DPJ)	113,988	41.1	New
JCP	Doshin Tokudome^{‡}	36,487	13.2	▲0.1
Happiness Realization	Koichi Maeda	6,853	2.5	New
NPF	Hidenori Wago	2,360	0.9	New
Registered electors		439,676		
Majority		3,484	1.3	▼16.8
Turnout		285,570	65.0	▲0.7
LDP hold		Swing	▼9.3	

2005
Party	Candidate	Votes	%	±%
LDP	Hakubun Shimomura^{‡} (incumbent)	148,099	55.0	▲6.0
Democratic	Koichiro Watanabe^{‡}	85,832	31.9	▼5.8
JCP	Doshin Tokudome	35,233	13.1	▼0.3
Registered electors		428,608		
Majority		62,267	23.1	▲11.1
Turnout		275,381	64.3	▲8.1
LDP hold		Swing	▲8.6	

2003
Party	Candidate	Votes	%	±%
LDP	Hakubun Shimomura^{‡} (incumbent)	113,477	49.0	▲11.2
Democratic	Koichiro Watanabe^{‡}	87,331	37.7	▲10.5
JCP	Doshin Tokudome	30,998	13.4	▼9.4
Registered electors		427,315		
Majority		26,146	11.3	▲0.7
Turnout		240,279	56.2	▼3.1
LDP hold		Swing	▲9.5	

2000
Party	Candidate	Votes	%	±%
LDP	Hakubun Shimomura^{‡} (incumbent)	90,483	37.8	▲7.8
Democratic	Osamu Shibutani^{‡} (incumbent - Tokyo PR)	65,109	27.2	New
JCP	Taketoshi Nakajima (incumbent - Tokyo PR)	54,698	22.8	▼1.2
Liberal	Kazuhiro Furuyama^{‡}	29,307	12.2	New
Registered electors		414,218		
Majority		25,374	10.6	▲7.5
Turnout		245,756	59.3	▲2.5
LDP hold		Swing	▲3.9	

=== Elections in the 1990s ===
1996
Party	Candidate	Votes	%	±%
LDP	Hakubun Shimomura^{‡}	68,321	30.1	New
New Frontier	Kazuhiro Furuyama	61,221	27.0	New
JCP	Taketoshi Nakajima^{‡‡} (incumbent - former Tokyo 9th)	54,559	24.0	New
Democratic	Osamu Shibutani^{‡}	38,454	16.9	New
New Socialist	Susumu Nishikawa	4,470	2.0	New
Registered electors		407,058		
Majority		7,100	3.1	New
Turnout		231,178	56.8	N/A
LDP win (new seat)				
