= Yukihiko Akutsu =

Japanese politician (born 1956)

- 阿久津 幸彦
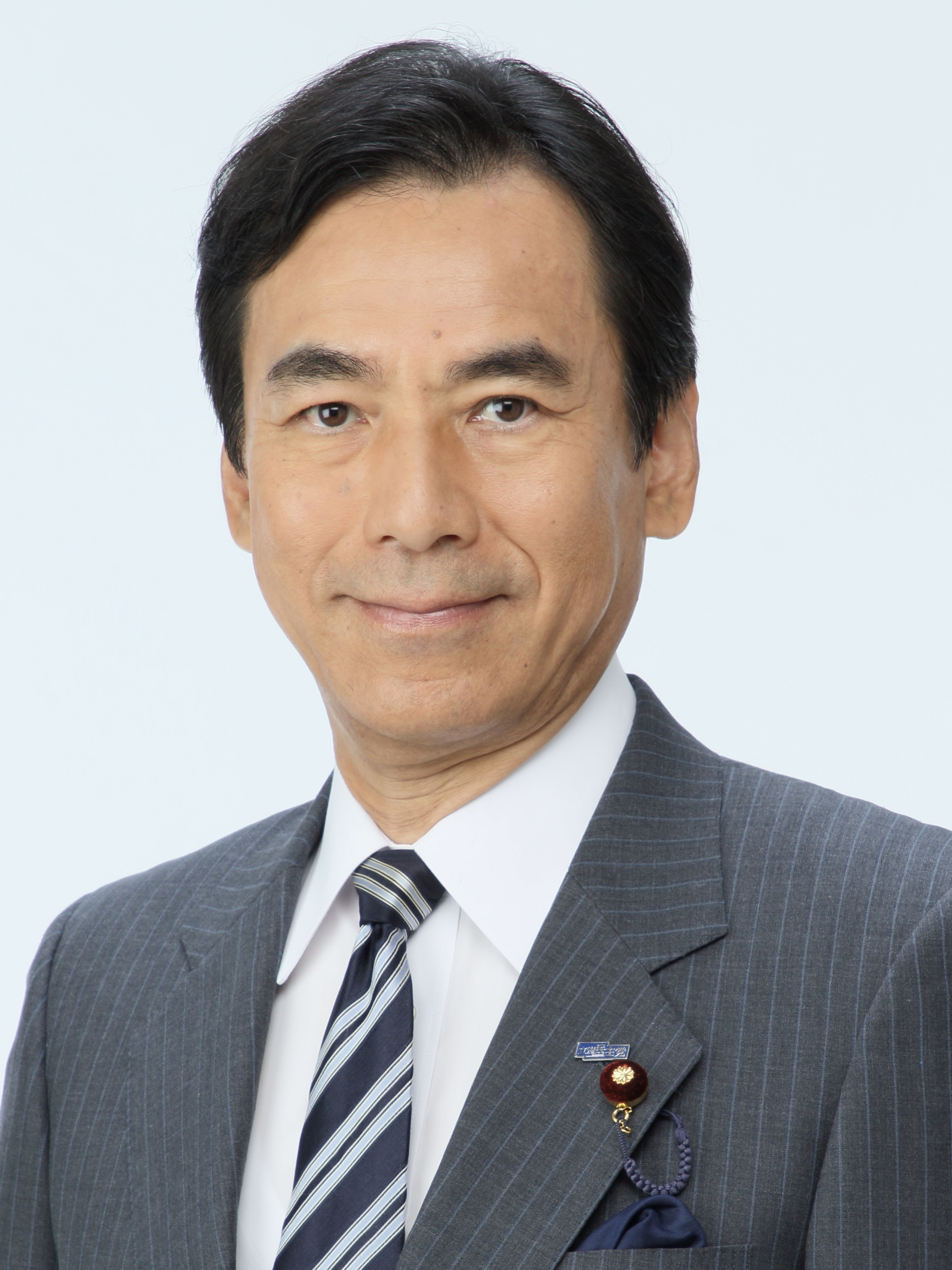
- Official portrait, 2018

Member of the House of Representatives
- In office 27 October 2024 – 23 January 2026
- Preceded by: Hakubun Shimomura
- Succeeded by: Hakubun Shimomura
- Constituency: Tokyo 11th
- In office 23 October 2017 – 14 October 2021
- Constituency: Tohoku PR
- In office 11 September 2009 – 16 November 2012
- Preceded by: Kōichi Hagiuda
- Succeeded by: Kōichi Hagiuda
- Constituency: Tokyo 24th
- In office 26 June 2000 – 8 August 2005
- Preceded by: Tamon Kobayashi
- Succeeded by: Multi-member district
- Constituency: Tokyo 24th (2000–2003); Tokyo PR (2003–2005)

Personal details
- Born: 26 June 1956 (age 70) Bunkyō, Tokyo, Japan
- Party: CRA (since 2026)
- Other political affiliations: Independent (1993–1994); NPS (1994–1996); DP 1996 (1996–1998); DPJ (1998–2016); DP 2016 (2016–2017); CDP (2017–2026)
- Education: George Washington University
- Website: Official blog

Yukihiko Akutsu (阿久津 幸彦, Akutsu Yukihiko; born 26 June 1956) is a Japanese politician of the Constitutional Democratic Party of Japan and a member of the House of Representatives in the Diet (national legislature).

== Biography ==
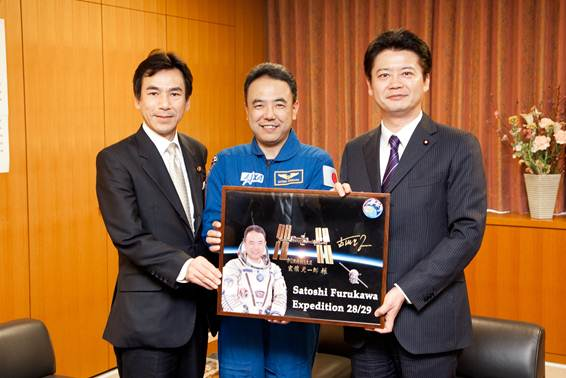
With Satoshi Furukawa and Koichiro Genba (on 25 February 2011)

A native of Tokyo and graduate of George Washington University, he started his career in 1993 working for the political campaign of the New Party Sakigake alongside future Prime Minister Naoto Kan. Akutsu joined the formation of the Democratic Party of Japan in 1996. He ran under their ticket in the 1996 general election as a candidate for Tokyo 24th district, but lost. In 2000, he ran and won the race for Tokyo-24th and entered the Diet for the first time. He lost the district race in the 2003 election, but was re-elected through the Tokyo proportional representation block. In 2005, he ran as candidate for the Tokyo prefectural elections but lost. In 2009, he returned to the Diet but lost his seat in the 2012 elections.

After running unsuccessfully in 2014, Akutsu was elected back to the Diet after being elected from the CDP list for the Tohoku PR block in the 2017. For a time he served as the deputy secretary-general of the party.
