= 2013 Tokyo prefectural election =

← 2009	14 June 2013	2017 →

All 127 seats in the Tokyo Metropolitan Assembly 64 seats needed for a majority
- Turnout: 43.50%(▼10.99%)
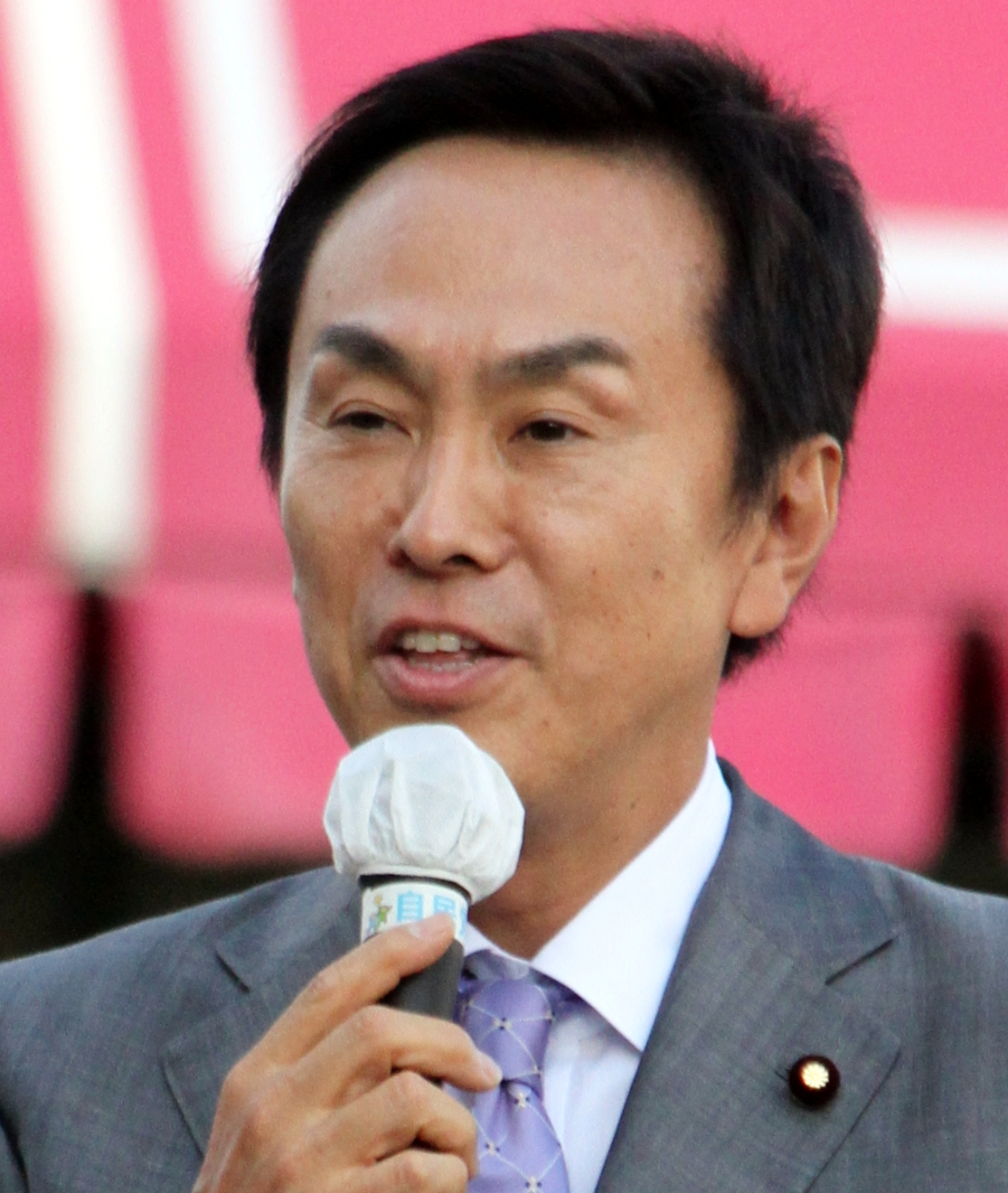

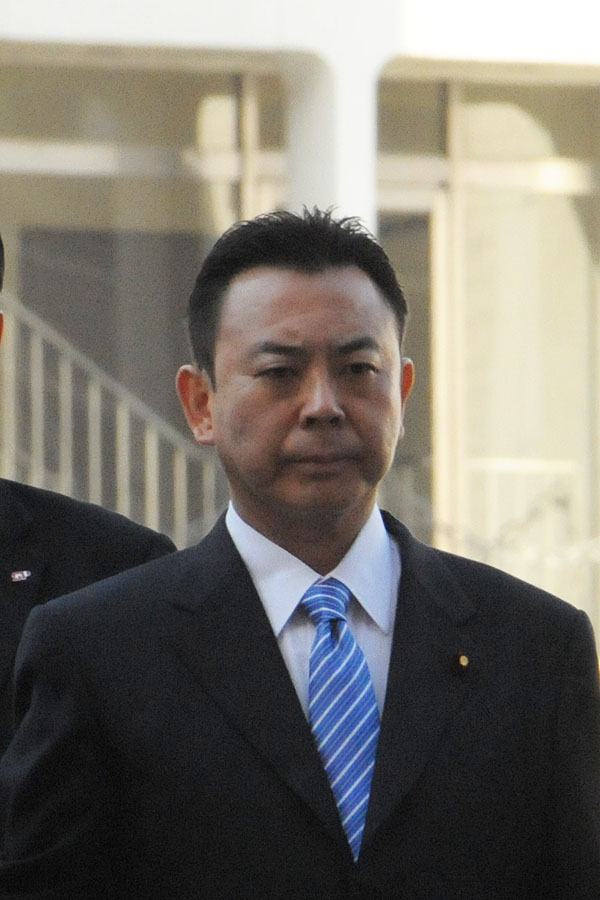

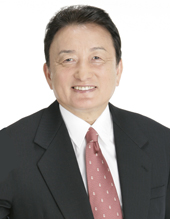

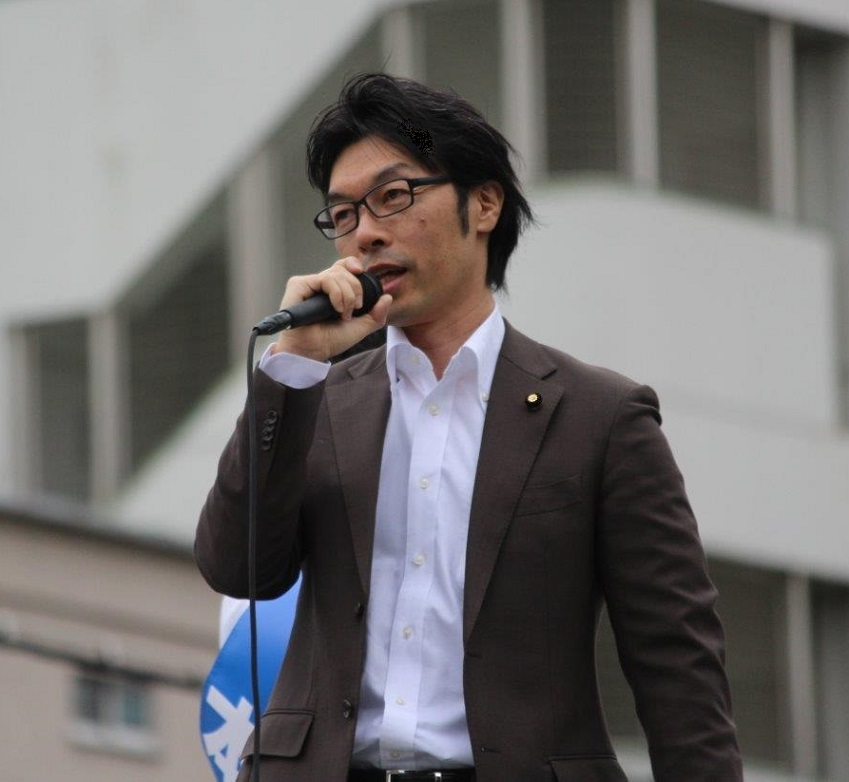

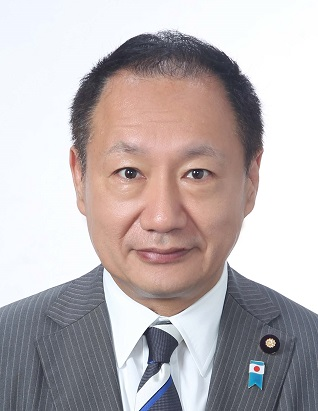
	First party	Second party	Third party
			共産
Leader	Nobuteru Ishihara	Yōsuke Takagi	Yoshiharu Wakabayashi
Party	LDP	Komeito	JCP
Leader since	September 2005	September 2009	1997
Last election	39	23	8
Seats before	39	23	8
Seats won	59	23	17
Seat change	▲20	0	▲9
Popular vote	1,633,304	639,160	616,722
Percentage	36.04%	14.10%	13.61%
	Fourth party	Fifth party	Sixth party
		ネット
Leader	Yoshikatsu Nakayama	Mitsuko Nishizaki	Kota Matsuda
Party	Democratic	Tokyo Seikatsusha Network	Your
Leader since	October 2012
Last election	54	2	New
Seats before	43	2	1
Seats won	15	3	7
Seat change	▼28	▲1	▲6
Popular vote	690,623	94,239	311,278
Percentage	15.24%	2.08%	6.87%
	Seventh party
Leader	Hiroshi Yamada
Party	Restoration
Leader since	November 2012
Last election	New
Seats before	3
Seats won	2
Seat change	▼1
Popular vote	374,109
Percentage	8.25%
Assembly President before election
Akihiko Nakamura
Democratic
Elected Assembly President
Toshiaki Yoshino
LDP

Prefectural elections for the Tokyo Metropolitan Assembly was held on 23 June 2013, one month before 2013 Japanese House of Councillors election.

The Liberal Democratic Party took majority control of the assembly from the Democratic Party of Japan after Prime Minister Shinzo Abe stated that the election had to be won "at any cost" in order to set the stage for an LDP victory in the House of Councillors election. Abe used the victory to claim popular backing for his "Abenomics" economic policies. The Japan Restoration Party performed poorly after controversial remarks by its leader Toru Hashimoto regarding comfort women, while Your Party made gains in the assembly after distancing itself from the JRP.

== Candidates ==
Number of candidates
Party	Total (Women)	Candidates			Pre-election strength
Party	Total (Women)	Incumbent	Former members	Newcomer	Pre-election strength
Democratic Party	44(6)	39	0	5	43
Liberal Democratic Party	59(3)	34	6	19	39
New Komeito	23(3)	23	0	0	23
Japanese Communist Party	42(16)	6	5	31	8
Japan Restoration Party	34(7)	3	3	28	3
Tokyo Seikatsusha Network	5(5)	2	0	3	2
Your Party	20(7)	1	0	19	1
People's Life Party	3(1)	0	1	2	0
Social Democratic Party	1(0)	0	0	1	0
Green Wind	1(1)	0	0	1	0
Minor parties	4(0)	0	1	3	0
Independent	17(4)	3	0	14	6
	253(53)	111	16	126	125

== Results ==
Summary of the 23 June 2013 Tokyo Metropolitan Assembly election results
Party	Candidates	Votes	%	Seats
Liberal Democratic Party of Japan (自由民主党, Jiyū Minshutō)	59	1,633,303	36.04	59
New Komeito Party (公明党, Kōmeitō)	23	639,160	14.10	23
Japanese Communist Party (日本共産党, Nihon Kyōsan-tō)	42	616,721	13.61	17
Democratic Party of Japan (民主党, Minshutō)	44	690,622	15.24	15
Your Party (みんなの党 Minna no Tō)	20	311,278	6.87	7
Tokyo Seikatsusha Network (東京・生活者ネットワーク)	5	94,239	2.08	3
Japan Restoration Party (日本維新の会 Nippon Ishin no Kai)	34	374,109	8.25	2
Social Democratic Party (社民党 Shamin-tō)	1	12,948	0.29	0
People's Life First (生活の党 Seikatsu no Tō)	3	9,563	0.21	0
Green Wind (みどりの風 Midori no Kaze)	1	6,463	0.14	0
Others	4	25,421	0.56	0
Independents	17	118,450	2.61	1
Total (turnout 43.50%)	253	4,532,279	100.00	127
Source: Tokyo electoral commission
