= Kaoru Fukuda (politician) =

Japanese politician (born 1985)

- 福田 かおる
- Official portrait, 2025

Member of the House of Representatives
- Incumbent
- Assumed office 27 October 2024
- Preceded by: Naoto Kan
- Constituency: Tokyo 18th

Personal details
- Born: 10 May 1985 (age 41) Takaoka, Toyama, Japan
- Party: Liberal Democratic
- Education: University of Tokyo; Columbia University

Kaoru Fukuda (福田かおる, Fukuda Kaoru; born 10 May 1985) is a Japanese politician serving as a member of the House of Representatives since 2024. She previously worked at the Ministry of Agriculture, Forestry and Fisheries and at the Japan External Trade Organization office in Bangkok, and served as secretary to Ken Saitō. Her registered family name is Kitaguchi (北口).

== Early life and education ==
Fukuda was born in Takaoka, Toyama Prefecture, Japan and raised in Misato, Saitama, Japan. Her father is an educational scholar specializing in Nordic education, and her mother is an elementary school teacher. Her grandfather was a military doctor.

She graduated from Shibuya Makuhari Junior and Senior High School, where she was a member of the Kendo club. During high school, she studied abroad at a public high school in the United States for approximately one year, where she witnessed the September 11 attacks. She subsequently graduated from the Faculty of Law at the University of Tokyo. During her university years, she organized the "National University Student Environmental Activity Contest" (ecocon) as a student representative.

== Civil service career ==
Fukuda joined the Ministry of Agriculture, Forestry and Fisheries (MAFF) in 2008. Until 2013, she worked at MAFF and the Japan Tourism Agency, engaging in regional revitalization through tourism and legal amendments to promote forest management.

From 2013 to 2015, she participated in long-term overseas training, earning a master's degree from the School of International and Public Affairs at Columbia University in the United States. She completed internships at the Food and Agriculture Organization (FAO) Regional Office for Asia and the Pacific, as well as in Thailand, India, Bangladesh, and Malawi.

After returning to MAFF in 2015, she worked on tasks related to the Trans-Pacific Partnership (TPP), revisions to fishing vessel and fishery insurance systems, and bilateral negotiation coordination. In 2017, she co-founded "Team414," a policy research team of young volunteers within MAFF, and published a "policy paper." Ken Saitō, then Minister of Agriculture, Forestry and Fisheries, received a direct briefing on Team414's activities from Fukuda and her colleagues. She was also seconded to the Cabinet Secretariat.

One notable episode during her time as a bureaucrat occurred during her secondment to the Japan External Trade Organization (JETRO) starting in 2018. In cooperation with Yusuke Ujiie of a trading firm and others, she worked to respond quickly to revisions in Thai law regarding the sorting and packaging of fresh produce, helping to protect approximately 40 billion yen in agricultural exports and promoting the expansion of export channels for produce such as peaches from Fukushima Prefecture. During the COVID-19 pandemic in 2020, she implemented projects to support the use of Japanese ingredients in Thailand, including SNS campaigns and strengthening food delivery services. As a result, the number of Japanese restaurants in Thailand continued to increase despite the pandemic.

She married at the age of 33. She retired from MAFF in March 2022.

== Political career ==
Encouraged by her spouse, Fukuda decided to enter politics. Initially, she served as a secretary to Ken Saitō. When Saitō was appointed Minister of Justice in November 2022, she became his policy secretary.

On March 22, 2023, following a public recruitment process restricted to female candidates, Fukuda was appointed head of the Liberal Democratic Party's (LDP) Tokyo 18th district branch. The appointment drew attention as the district has long been a stronghold for former Prime Minister Naoto Kan of the Constitutional Democratic Party (CDP).

In August 2024, she was selected as a member of the first cohort of the "Reiwa Seikei Gijuku" (Reiwa Political and Economic School), operated by the Next Japan Initiative.

=== House of Representatives ===
In the 2024 Japanese general election held on October 27, 2024, Fukuda ran in the Tokyo 18th district against Reiko Matsushita (CDP), Yukiko Tokunaga (Sanseitō), and Ryo Higuchi (JCP). Although the LDP suffered a major defeat overall, Fukuda defeated Matsushita by approximately 2,200 votes to win her first term. Matsushita, who had been designated as Naoto Kan's successor, secured a seat through proportional representation.

Fukuda first attended the Diet on November 11, 2024. During the 217th Diet session starting in January 2025, she participated in the Special Committee on Political Reform, the Budget Committee, the Health, Labour and Welfare Committee, and the Security Committee.

In October 2025, she was appointed as Parliamentary Vice-Minister of Education, Culture, Sports, Science and Technology in the Takaichi Cabinet, despite being a first-term lawmaker.

In the 2026 Japanese general election held on February 8, 2026, Fukuda won re-election in the Tokyo 18th district, defeating Reiko Matsushita again. During the campaign, Tokyo Governor Yuriko Koike campaigned on her behalf.

== Policies ==
Fukuda lists her key policy areas as:

- Employment and Wages
- Education Reform
- National Security

== Personal life ==
- Since 2023, when she became the branch head for Tokyo 18th district, Fukuda has been active as a Local Guide on Google Maps, posting photo reviews of restaurants in the area. As of November 2024, she had reviewed approximately 100 establishments. Her detailed reviews, including information on Wi-Fi availability, were described by a weekly magazine as "Reiwa-style dobuita (door-to-door) campaigning."

== Controversies ==
=== Photography in the Diet Chamber ===
On November 11, 2024, her first day in the House of Representatives, Fukuda took a commemorative photo with fellow lawmaker Jun Mukaiyama inside the assembly hall before the plenary session began. As Article 211 of the Rules of the House of Representatives is interpreted to prohibit photography inside the chamber, this act was considered a violation. Fukuda apologized on X (formerly Twitter) that night. The LDP executives issued a verbal warning to both lawmakers, and the LDP directors apologized at the Steering Committee board meeting two days later.

=== Gift Certificate Incident ===
On March 13, 2025, Prime Minister Shigeru Ishiba held a dinner at the Prime Minister's Official Residence with 15 first-term LDP lawmakers, including Fukuda. Before the dinner, the Prime Minister's secretary visited the lawmakers' offices and distributed gift certificates worth 100,000 yen per person as a "souvenir." The lawmakers realized the nature of the gift after the dinner and consulted with each other the following day. Ultimately, all 15 members returned the gift certificates. Prime Minister Ishiba later explained the incident in the House of Councillors Budget Committee.
