= Seikatsu Club Consumers' Co-operative Union =

Seikatsu Club Consumers’ Co-operative Union
- Native name: 生活クラブ事業連合生活協同組合連合会
- Company type: Cooperative federation
- Founded: 1965
- Headquarters: Shinjuku, Tokyo, Japan
- Area served: Japan
- Key people: Koichi Kato, Chairperson; Yoshiyuki Fukuoka, Executive Director
- Website: seikatsuclub.coop

The Seikatsu Club Consumers’ Co-operative Union (SCCCU; Japanese: 生活クラブ事業連合生活協同組合連合会, romanized: Seikatsu kurabu jigyō rengō Seikatsukyōdōkumiai rengō-kai) is a Japanese federation of consumer co-operatives headquartered in Tokyo. It was formed in 1965 and has 307,000 members, most of whom are women.

SCCCU is divided into groups of households who order food collectively and offers only 3,000 products, and mostly staple foods. As the co-operative federation is concerned with food safety, it buys organic food and shuns those generated from genetically modified organisms. SCCCU also produces its own milk and biodegradable soap.

In 1979, SCCCU started running candidates for political office through the Tokyo Seikatsusha Network and now has over 100 members who serve as local councillors.

The federation received a Right Livelihood Award in 1989 "for creating the most successful, sustainable model of production and consumption in the industrialised world."

== Member co-operatives ==
- 23Ku Minami ("23 Wards South") Seikatsu Club
- Kawasaki Seikatsu Club
- Kita Tokyo("North Tokyo") Seikatsu Club
- Sagami Seikatsu Club Fukushi ("Welfare") Club
- Seikatsu Club Aichi
- Seikatsu Club Aomori
- Seikatsu Club Chiba
- Seikatsu Club Fukushima Co-operative
- Seikatsu Club Gunma
- Seikatsu Club Hokkaido
- Seikatsu Club Ibaraki
- Seikatsu Club Iwate
- Seikatsu Club Kanagawa
- Seikatsu Club Kyoto L･Co-op
- Seikatsu Club Nagano
- Seikatsu Club Nara
- Seikatsu Club Osaka
- Seikatsu Club Saitama
- Seikatsu Club Shizuoka
- Seikatsu Club Tochigi
- Seikatsu Club Tokyo
- Seikatsu Club Yamagata Co-operative
- Seikatsu Club Yamanashi
- Syonan Seikatsu Club
- Tama Kita("Tama North") Seikatsu Club
- Tama Minami ("Tama South") Seikatsu Club
- Yokohama Kita("Yokohama North") Seikatsu Club
- Yokohama Minami ("Yokohama South") Seikatsu Club
