= Haruhiko Tsuchiya =

Haruhiko Tsuchiya (Japanese: 土屋 治彦) from the University of Yamanashi, Kofu, Yamanashi, Japan was named Fellow of the Institute of Electrical and Electronics Engineers (IEEE) in 2013 for contributions to single-mode optical fiber transmission.
