= Tokyo 24th district =

Parliamentary constituency for the Japanese House of Representatives

Tokyo 24th District
- Parliamentary constituency for the Japanese House of Representatives
- Numbered map of inner Tokyo single-member districts
- Prefecture: Tokyo
- Proportional District: Tokyo
- Electorate: 382,675 (2022)

Current constituency
- Created: 1994
- Party: LDP
- Representative: Koichi Hagiuda
- Municipalities: Hachiōji (excluding the areas of the former Yugi village)

Tokyo 24th district 東京都第24区 (Tōkyō-to dai 24-ku) is a single-member constituency of the House of Representatives, the lower house of the national Diet of Japan. It is located in western Tokyo and consists of most of Hachiōji City.

The seat is held by Kōichi Hagiuda since 2012. Hagiuda, a former policy chief of the Liberal Democratic Party, did not receive LDP endorsement in the 2024 Japanese general election because of involvement in the 2023–2024 Japanese slush fund scandal and ran as an independent candidate.

As of September 2022, 382,675 voters were registered in the district.

== Areas covered ==
The district underwent redistricting on 2017 and 2022, after revisions of the Public Offices Election Law.

=== Current areas (2022–present) ===
- Hachiōji (excluding the areas of the former Yugi village)

=== Areas 2017–2022 ===
- Hachiōji (excluding Higashi-Nakano and Otsuka)

=== Areas 1996–2017 ===
- All of Hachiōji

== List of representatives ==
| Representatives | Party | Dates | Notes |
| Tamon Kobayashi | LDP | 1996–2000 | Lost re-election. |
| Yukihiko Akatsu | DPJ | 2000–2003 | Re-elected in the Tokyo PR block. |
| Koichi Haguida | LDP | 2003–2009 | Re-elected in 2005. Lost re-election in 2009. |
| Yukihiko Akatsu | DPJ | 2009–2012 | Lost re-election in 2012. |
| Koichi Haguida | LDP | 2012– present | Minister of Economy, Trade and Industry (2021–2022) Minister of Education, Culture, Sports, Science and Technology (2019–2021) Deputy Chief Cabinet Secretary (2015–2016) Re-elected in 2014, 2017, 2021, 2024, 2026. |

== Election results ==
2026 Japanese general election
| Party | Candidate | Votes | % | ±% |
|---|---|---|---|---|
| LDP | Koichi Hagiuda (incumbent) (Endorsed by Ishin) | 85,806 | 41.1 | ▲2.4 |
| Centrist Reform | Yū Hosogai | 70,781 | 33.9 | ▼1.1 |
| DPP | Ryō Hosoya | 22,263 | 10.7 | ▼1.3 |
| Sanseitō | Sayuri Yokura | 16,909 | 8.1 | ▲3.9 |
| Independent | Moe Fukada | 13,209 | 6.3 | |
| Turnout | | 208,968 | 56.39 | ▼0.09 |
| LDP hold | | | | |

2024 Japanese general election
| Party | Candidate | Votes | % | ±% |
|---|---|---|---|---|
| Independent | Koichi Hagiuda (incumbent) (endorsed by the LDP Hachiōji branch) | 79,216 | 38.65 | ▼19.95 |
| CDP | Yoshifu Arita (Won PR seat) (Endorsed by SDP) | 71,683 | 34.97 | |
| DPP | Yūsuke Urakawa | 24,653 | 12.03 | ▼5.46 |
| Ishin | Yumi Satō | 18,501 | 9.03 | |
| Sanseitō | Sayuri Yokura | 8,678 | 4.23 | |
| Independent | Ayao Hatajiri | 2,251 | 1.10 | |
| Turnout | | 204,982 | 56.48 | ▼0.29 |

2021 Japanese general election
| Party | Candidate | Votes | % | ±% |
|---|---|---|---|---|
| LDP | Koichi Hagiuda (incumbent) (endorsed by Komeito) | 149,152 | 58.6 | ▲9.3 |
| DPP | Yumi Sato | 44,546 | 17.49 | New |
| JCP | Honoka Yoshikawa | 44,474 | 17.46 | ▲7.7 |
| Social Democratic | Reiko Asakura | 16,590 | 6.5 | New |
| Turnout | | 254,762 | 56.8 | ▲1.6 |
| LDP hold | | | | |

2017 Japanese general election
| Party | Candidate | Votes | % | ±% |
|---|---|---|---|---|
| LDP | Koichi Hagiuda (incumbent) (endorsed by Komeito) | 122,331 | 49.3 | ▼2.4 |
| CDP | Narihisa Takahashi | 61,441 | 23.3 | New |
| Kibō no Tō | Mika Yoshiba | 39,892 | 16.1 | New |
| JCP | Miyako Iida | 24,349 | 9.8 | ▼3.7 |
| Turnout | | 248,013 | 55.2 | ▼0.2 |
| LDP hold | | | | |

2014 Japanese general election
| Party | Candidate | Votes | % | ±% |
|---|---|---|---|---|
| LDP | Koichi Hagiuda (incumbent) (endorsed by Komeito) | 126,024 | 51.7 | ▲7.5 |
| Democratic | Yukihiko Akutsu (endorsed by Japan Innovation Party) | 71,212 | 29.2 | ▲7.1 |
| JCP | Katsuhiro Ichikawa | 32,887 | 13.5 | ▲5.7 |
| Japanese Kokoro | Yoshihiro Fujii | 13,680 | 5.6 | New |
| Turnout | | 243,803 | 55.4 | ▼6.8 |
| LDP hold | | | | |

2012 Japanese general election
| Party | Candidate | Votes | % | ±% |
|---|---|---|---|---|
| LDP | Koichi Hagiuda (endorsed by Komeito) | 121,433 | 44.2 | ▲3.7 |
| Democratic | Yukihiko Akutsu (incumbent) (endorsed by People's New Party) | 60,784 | 22.1 | ▼27.4 |
| Your | Hiroyuki Kobayashi | 40,922 | 14.9 | New |
| Restoration | Yoshihiro Fujii | 30,042 | 10.9 | New |
| JCP | Masuo Minegishi | 21,448 | 7.8 | ▼1.0 |
| Turnout | | 274,629 | 62.2 | ▼6.3 |
| LDP gain from Democratic | | | | |

2009 Japanese general election
| Party | Candidate | Votes | % | ±% |
|---|---|---|---|---|
| Democratic | Yukihiko Akutsu | 148,719 | 49.5 | ▲11.9 |
| LDP | Koichi Hagiuda (incumbent) (endorsed by Komeito) | 121,867 | 40.5 | ▼12.7 |
| JCP | Akira Hasegawa | 26,392 | 8.8 | ▼0.5 |
| Happiness Realization | Tomoko Onozawa | 3,762 | 1.3 | New |
| Turnout | | 300,740 | 68.5 | ▲1.7 |
| Democratic gain from LDP | | | | |

2005 Japanese general election
| Party | Candidate | Votes | % | ±% |
|---|---|---|---|---|
| LDP | Koichi Hagiuda (incumbent) | 150,552 | 53.2 | ▲8.9 |
| Democratic | Yukihiko Akutsu | 106,459 | 37.6 | ▼5.8 |
| JCP | Akira Hasegawa | 26,233 | 9.3 | ▲0.6 |
| Turnout | | 283,244 | 66.8 | ▲6.7 |
| LDP hold | | | | |

2003 Japanese general election
| Party | Candidate | Votes | % | ±% |
|---|---|---|---|---|
| LDP | Koichi Hagiuda | 108,843 | 44.3 | ▲4.5 |
| Democratic | Yukihiko Akutsu (elected by PR) | 106,733 | 43.4 | ▼0.9 |
| JCP | Minoru Fujimoto | 21,407 | 8.7 | ▼7.0 |
| Independent | Kaoru Ishibashi | 8,762 | 3.6 | New |
| Turnout | | 245,745 | 60.1 | ▼1.3 |
| LDP gain from Democratic | | | | |

2000 Japanese general election
| Party | Candidate | Votes | % | ±% |
|---|---|---|---|---|
| Democratic | Yukihiko Akutsu | 106,292 | 44.5 | New |
| LDP | Tamon Kobayashi (incumbent) | 95,102 | 39.8 | ▲5.8 |
| JCP | Minoru Fujimoto | 37,492 | 15.7 | ▲1.7 |
| Turnout | | 238,886 | 61.4 | ▲2.7 |
| Democratic gain from LDP | | | | |

1996 Japanese general election
| Party | Candidate | Votes | % | ±% |
|---|---|---|---|---|
| LDP | Tamon Kobayashi | 75,061 | 34.0 | New |
| New Frontier | Yousuke Takagi | 64,730 | 29.3 | New |
| Democratic | Yukihiko Akutsu | 50,067 | 22.7 | New |
| JCP | Kenjiro Takeyama | 30,965 | 14.0 | New |
| Turnout | | 220,823 | 58.7 | New |
| LDP win (new seat) | | | | |
