= 2009 Tokyo prefectural election =

← 2005	3 July 2009	2013 →

All 127 seats in the Tokyo Metropolitan Assembly 64 seats needed for a majority
- Turnout: 54.49%(▲10.50%)
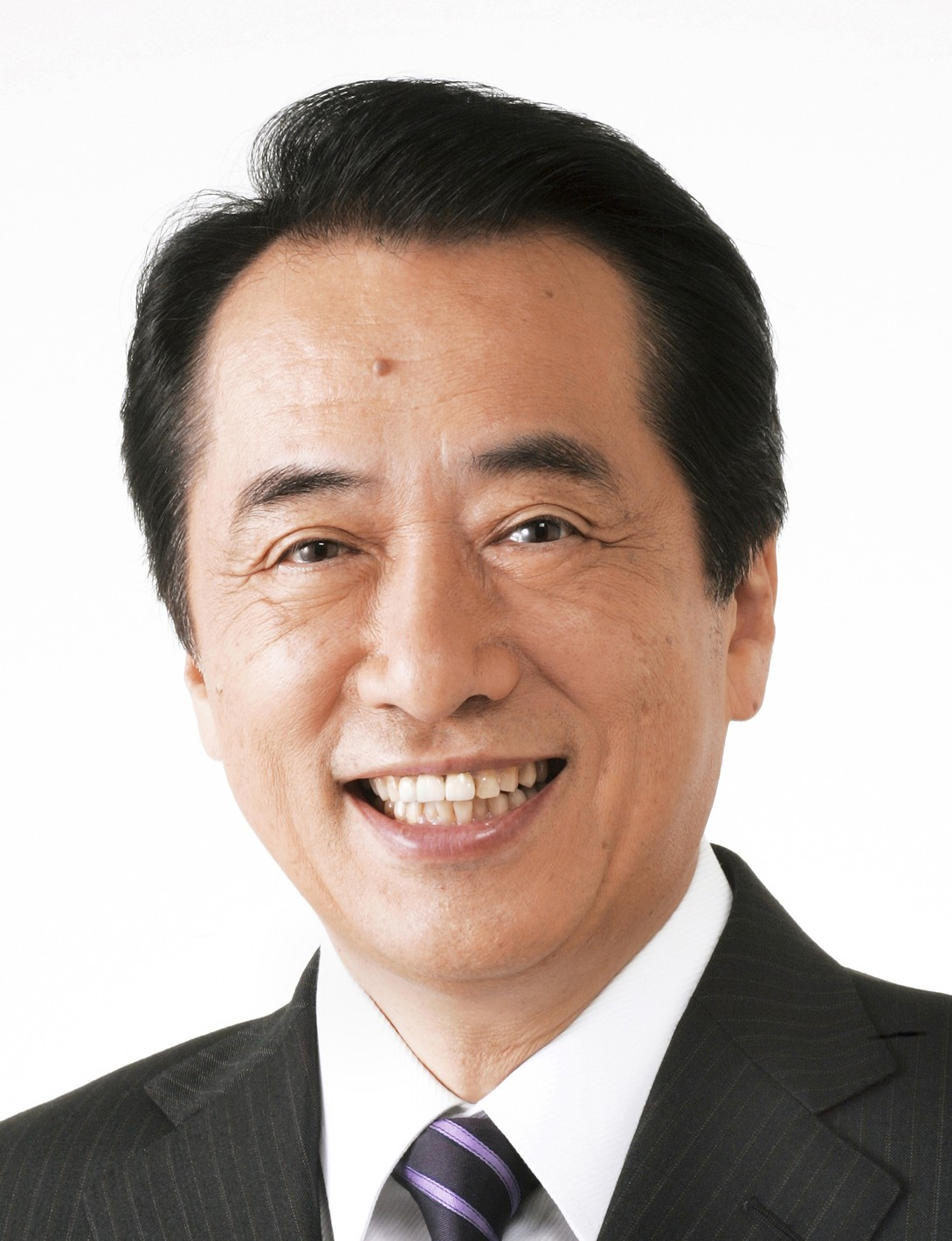

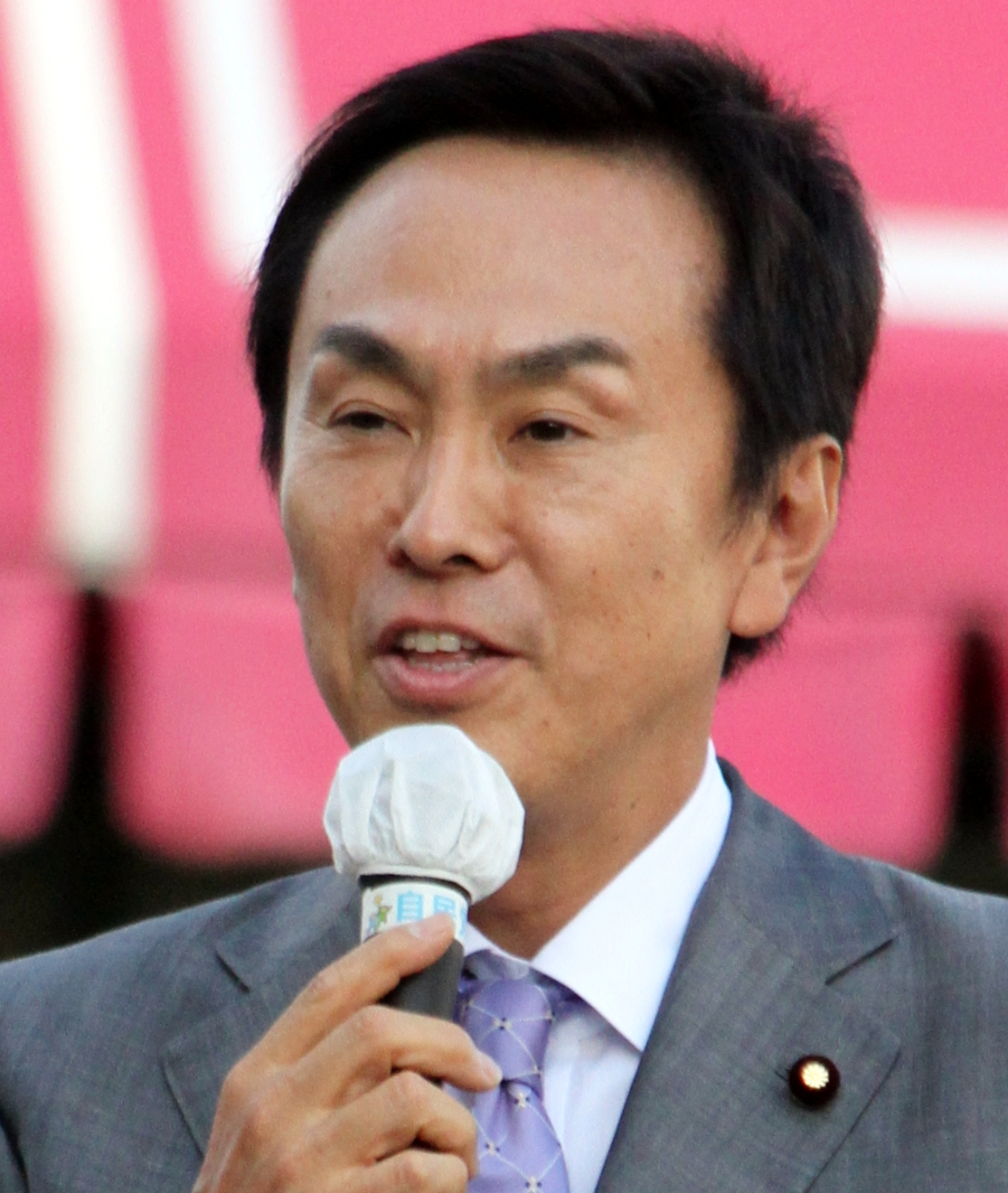

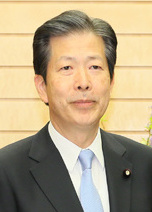
	First party	Second party	Third party
Leader	Naoto Kan	Nobuteru Ishihara	Natsuo Yamaguchi
Party	Democratic	LDP	Komeito
Leader since	December 2008	September 2005	May 2003
Last election	35	48	22
Seats before	34	48	22
Seats won	54	38	23
Seat change	▲20	▼10	▲1
Popular vote	2,298,495	1,458,108	743,428
Percentage	40.79%	25.88%	13.19%
	Fourth party	Fifth party
	共産	ネット
Leader	Yoshiharu Wakabayashi	Fumie Yamaguchi
Party	JCP	Tokyo Seikatsusha Network
Leader since	1997
Last election	13	3
Seats before	13	4
Seats won	8	2
Seat change	▼5	▼2
Popular vote	707,602	110,407
Percentage	12.56%	1.96%
Assembly President before election
Toshio Hiruma
LDP
Elected Assembly President
Ryo Tanaka
Democratic

Prefectural elections for the Tokyo Metropolitan Assembly were held on 12 July 2009. In the runup to the Japanese general election due by October they were seen as an important test for Taro Aso's ruling coalition of the Liberal Democratic Party (LDP) and the New Komeito. New Komeito considers Tokyo as an important stronghold and had repeatedly asked Prime Minister Aso to avoid holding the two elections within a month of each other.

Campaigning officially started on July 3, 2009. The prefecture's 10.6 million registered voters (up 230,000 from 2005) were called upon to elect the 127 Assembly members in 42 electoral districts at 1,868 polling stations across Tokyo. 221 candidates had been formally registered with the Tokyo metropolitan electoral commission. The LDP and the Democratic Party of Japan (DPJ) each endorsed 58 candidates, the Japan Communist Party (JCP) supports 40 and New Komeito formally fields 23 candidates, though it has also decided to support LDP candidates in several districts. Local campaign issues included Tokyo's bid for the 2016 Olympic Games and governor Shintaro Ishihara's plan to relocate the Tsukiji fish market in 2012. The national debate over a possible ban of "hereditary" (世襲, seshū) politicians has also affected several candidates.

Tokyo's legislative election is one of only three elections for prefectural parliaments countrywide that are not held in the "unified regional election" (tōitsu chihō senkyo, last round: 2007), the other two being Ibaraki's and Okinawa's prefectural assembly elections.

== Results ==
Polls closed at 8:00 pm Japan Standard Time. Turnout was significantly up from 2005 and stood at 54.5 percent. The DPJ picked up 20 seats and saw 54 of their 58 candidates elected. The LDP lost its status as strongest party in the Metropolitan Assembly for the first time since 1965. Despite strong results for coalition partner Kōmeitō, the ruling camp could not defend an absolute majority (64 seats). The only electoral district where an LDP candidate received the most votes (top tōsen) was the single-member [Izu and Ogasawara] islands electoral district of former assembly president Chūichi Kawashima, a native of Ōshima town who had represented the islands since 1985.

Summary of the 12 July 2009 Tokyo Metropolitan Assembly election results
Parties	Candidates	Votes	%	Seats
Democratic Party of Japan (民主党, Minshutō)	58	2,298,494	40.79	54
Liberal Democratic Party of Japan (自由民主党, Jiyū Minshutō)	58	1,458,108	25.88	38
New Komeito Party (公明党, Kōmeitō)	23	743,427	13.19	23
Japanese Communist Party (日本共産党, Nihon Kyōsan-tō)	40	707,602	12.56	8
Tokyo Seikatsusha Network (東京・生活者ネットワーク)	5	110,407	1.96	2
Social Democratic Party (社民党 Shamin-tō)	2	20,084	0.36	0
Others	13	45,329	0.80	0
Independents	22	250,869	4.45	2
Total (turnout 54.49%)	221	5,705,441	100.00	127
Source: Tokyo electoral commission Archived 2013-02-20 at the Wayback Machine

== Aftermath ==
The president of the LDP's Tokyo prefectural federation, one of governor Ishihara's then two sons in the national House of Representatives, Nobuteru, initially hinted to step down as LDP Tokyo chief, but eventually stayed on. Nationally, Tarō Asō came under pressure within his party to resign immediately as party president-prime minister, but could avoid a leadership challenge by calling the general election of the House of Representatives early – the election on August 30 resulted in a landslide loss for the ruling coalition.

Democrat Ryō Tanaka from Suginami was elected assembly president, Kantarō Suzuki (Kōmeitō, Arakawa) became vice president. The assembly majority in the new assembly is often involved in disputes with governor Ishihara over the budget, the Tsukiji relocation and other issues. Yet, in the gubernatorial election of 2011 (part of the unified regional election), Ishihara was safely reelected for a fourth term.
