= Masatada Tsuchiya =

Japanese politician

- 土屋 正忠
- Official portrait, 2015

Member of the House of Representatives
- In office 19 December 2012 – 28 September 2017
- Preceded by: Naoto Kan
- Succeeded by: Naoto Kan
- Constituency: Tokyo 18th
- In office 11 September 2005 – 21 July 2009
- Constituency: Tokyo PR

Mayor of Musashino
- In office May 1983 – August 2005
- Preceded by: Masanobu Fujimoto
- Succeeded by: Morimasa Murakami

Member of the Musashino City Council
- In office May 1975 – April 1983

Personal details
- Born: 13 January 1942 (age 84) Tokyo, Japan
- Party: Liberal Democratic
- Education: Waseda University

Masatada Tsuchiya (土屋 正忠, Tsuchiya Masatada; born 13 January 1942) is a former Japanese lawmaker from the Liberal Democratic Party who lost his single member district seat in the House of Representatives to Constitutional Democratic Party of Japan member Naoto Kan in the October 2017 general election by 1,046 votes.

== Political career ==
Tsuchiya entered national politics after resigning from his position as mayor of Musashino, Tokyo in 2005 to run against the then Deputy President of the Democratic Party of Japan, Kan, for the House of Representatives seat in the Tokyo 18th district. Although Tsuchiya lost in the run-off, he was still elected under the party-list proportional representation system. Kan and Tsuchiya have since continued to face off in House of Representatives elections, with Kan holding on to the single member district seat through the 2009 general election, and Tsuchiya capturing the single member district seat in the 2012 general election and the 2014 general election.

In the October 2017 general election, Tsuchiya was unable to secure a seat in the House of Representatives under the party-list proportional representation system due to a rule within the Liberal Democratic Party limiting party-list proportional representation candidates to those aged 73 or under. Tsuchiya was 75 at the time he ran in the October 2017 general election.

House of Representatives (Japan)
Preceded by N/A	Member of the House of Representatives from Tokyo PR block 2005–2009	Succeeded by N/A
Preceded by Naoto Kan	Member of the House of Representatives from Tokyo 18th district (single-member); 2012–2017	Succeeded by Naoto Kan
Political offices
Preceded by Masanobu Fujimoto	Mayor of Musashino; 1983–2005	Succeeded by Morimasa Murakami
Preceded by Kazuo Yoshino (Mayor of Fuchū)	Chairman of the conference of Tokyo's city mayors 1996–1998	Succeeded by Chiaki Usui (Mayor of Tama)
