= Hakubun Shimomura =

Japanese politician (born 1954)

- 下村 博文
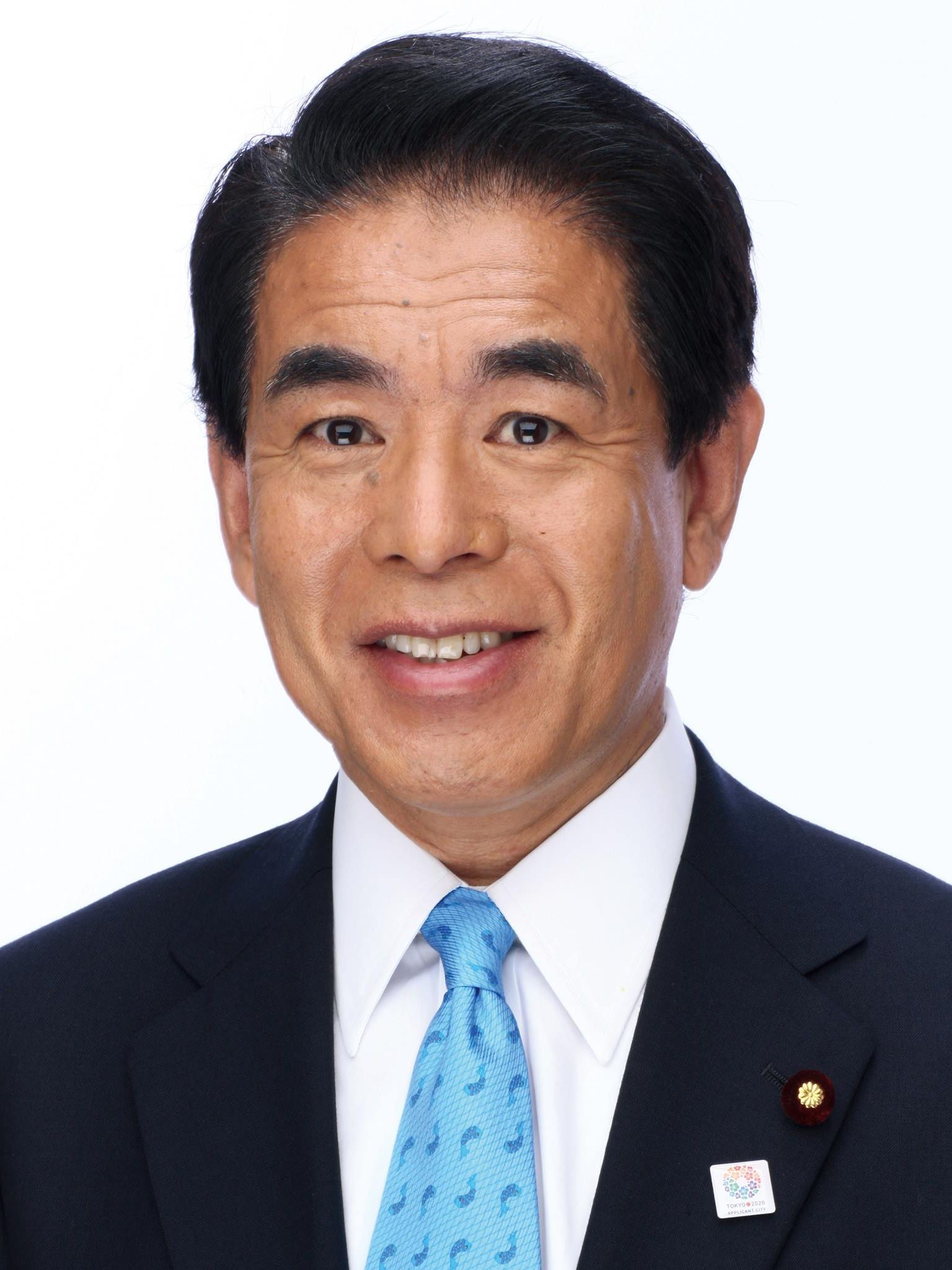
- Official portrait, 2013

Minister for the Tokyo Olympic and Paralympic Games
- In office 13 September 2013 – 25 June 2015
- Prime Minister: Shinzo Abe
- Preceded by: Office established
- Succeeded by: Toshiaki Endo

Minister of Education, Culture, Sports, Science and Technology
- In office 26 December 2012 – 7 October 2015
- Prime Minister: Shinzo Abe
- Preceded by: Makiko Tanaka
- Succeeded by: Hiroshi Hase

Deputy Chief Cabinet Secretary (Political affairs, House of Representatives)
- In office 26 September 2006 – 27 August 2007
- Prime Minister: Shinzo Abe
- Preceded by: Jinen Nagase
- Succeeded by: Matsushige Ono

Member of the House of Representatives
- Incumbent
- Assumed office 8 February 2026
- Preceded by: Yukihiko Akutsu
- Constituency: Tokyo 11th
- In office 20 October 1996 – 9 October 2024
- Preceded by: Constituency established
- Succeeded by: Yukihiko Akutsu
- Constituency: Tokyo 11th

Member of the Tokyo Metropolitan Assembly
- In office 1989–1996
- Succeeded by: Yukihiko Akutsu
- Constituency: Itabashi Ward

Personal details
- Born: 23 May 1954 (age 72) Takasaki, Gunma, Japan
- Party: Liberal Democratic
- Education: Waseda University
- Website: Official website

Hakubun Shimomura (下村 博文, Shimomura Hakubun; born 23 May 1954) is a Japanese political activist of the Liberal Democratic Party (LDP), a member of the House of Representatives in for Tokyo 11th district the Diet (national legislature).

Shimomura is affiliated with the openly revisionist organization Nippon Kaigi. As Minister of Education, he oversaw the approval of textbooks that have been described as minimizing Japan's role in the Second Sino-Japanese War and World War II, to avoid a "masochistic view of history". He has advocated for Prime Minister Shinzo Abe to deny the Nanjing Massacre and the existence of the comfort women system.

Shimomura held a seat in the Diet for nearly three decades, winning nine consecutive terms until losing in the 2024 Japanese general election. But he regained his seat in 2026 Japanese general election.

== Early life and education ==
A native of Takasaki, Gunma Prefecture, Shimomura was born on 23 May 1954. He lost his father at the age of nine and endured severe financial hardship in order to complete his education, but obtained scholarships to complete high school and university. He operated a cram school while enrolled as a student at Waseda University.

== Career ==
Shimomura had served in the assembly of Tokyo for two terms since 1989. He was elected to the House of Representatives for the first time in 1996. He is a representative of the district of Tokyo No. 11 in the lower house. He was deputy chief cabinet secretary in the first government of Shinzo Abe in 2006.

=== Minister of Education ===
Shimomura was again appointed to the Cabinet by Shinzo Abe as minister of education, culture, sports, science and technology on 26 December 2012. As minister, Shimomura expanded the ability of local schools to provide Saturday classes and pushed for the globalization of Japanese universities by increasing English skills and hiring more foreign faculty.

==== Textbook controversies ====
As education minister, Shimomura became associated with the various Japanese history textbook controversies. He advocated for avoiding a "masochistic view of history" about Japan's role in the Second Sino-Japanese War and World War II. Textbooks approved under his administration have been described as "[diluting] or [expunging] references to Japanese war crimes". He claimed that examinations of Japanese textbooks were fair and impartial, although he wanted a more "patriotic take on Japan". He claimed he wanted to seek to balance out the bad aspects of Japan's history and emphasize points of pride. Shimomura also advocated for revoking the 1995 Murayama Statement, in which remorse was expressed to Asia for Japan's wartime atrocities. All textbooks he approved stressed the Japanese government's position on territorial disputes with Japan's neighbors.

=== Later career ===
He oversaw preparations by the Organising Committee for the 2020 Summer Olympics on behalf of the national government in Tokyo before being replaced by Olympics Minister Toshiaki Endo on 25 June 2015.

Following the resignation of Tokyo governor Naoki Inose on 19 December 2013, Shimomura was widely rumored to be a potential candidate for the gubernatorial election expected to be held in February 2014, along with Yuriko Koike, Hideo Higashikokubaru, Seiko Hashimoto and Yoichi Masuzoe. The LDP excluded his name from consideration in a 20 December poll so that he could focus his efforts on the Tokyo Olympics.

== Political views ==
Shimomura is affiliated with the openly revisionist organization Nippon Kaigi, and his political views are fully consistent with the organization's agenda.

Prior to the 2012 general election, Shimomura told the magazine Apple Town that "we intend to construct a genuinely conservative administration... [such that] has only existed for about three years since the war", describing tensions with China and South Korea as a "national crisis" and stating that "the 67 years since the end of World War II have been a history of Japan’s destruction."

In 2012, he argued that Abe "should declare that the Nanjing Massacre did not take place and the issue of comfort women does not exist. He should fully negate the Tokyo Trials historical viewpoint and should also visit Yasukuni Shrine". He made these comments in spite of remarks he had made in 2007 that "it is true that there were comfort women. I believe some parents may have sold their daughters. But it does not mean the Japanese army was involved." Following his appointment as education minister in 2012, he refused to comment on the issue but stated that "the government has decided to study Japan's interpretation of history, including the Kono Statement [acknowledging the army's involvement], and I would like to express my views during that process, if necessary."

In 2007, Shimomura said in response to four upcoming films on the 70th anniversary of the Nanjing Massacre in China, "There will be various movies and exhibitions on the Nanking incident, and it is natural that we should make efforts to suggest more details of facts and prevent wrong views from spreading in China".

Shimomura refused to intercede in a debate over the censorship of the manga Barefoot Gen, which depicts the atomic bombing of Hiroshima and Japan's culpability in World War II, by a school board in Matsue, stating that young students may not be able to understand its depictions properly.

Shimomura supported the restarting of nuclear power reactors in Japan following the Fukushima nuclear disaster, stating that "if Japan finds itself losing its power supply, companies would quickly relocate their operations abroad and deindustrialization would rapidly spread – and Japan wouldn't be able to revitalize its economy."

Shimomura has a son with a learning disability who graduated from the University of the Arts London in 2013. Shimomura commented to the New York Times that his son would not have been able to enroll in a Japanese university, and said "the British system is more open to a broader range of people and talents... I would like to see the system here be revamped so that avenues of opportunities will be open to all children. After all, considering where we want to go, it is less important for us to create 10,000 people with run-of-the mill capabilities than a few with superb talents."

In April 2018, Shimomura called it "almost a crime" for the TV reporter who complained of sexually harassment (explicit language) to have secretly taped the former Ministry of Finance top official Junichi Fukuda who was her alleged victimizer and "selling" the story to a tabloid weekly. The originally anonymous reporter was revealed to be affiliated with TV Asahi by the time Shimomura made the statement. Although he retracted his choice of words the next day, he still insisted he had a point to make in that the reporter violated the journalistic principle of speaking off-the-record, and he spoke out because he suspected her of staging this with the intention of selling the story to the tabloids from the beginning.

Political offices
Preceded by Makiko Tanaka	Minister of Education, Culture, Sports, Science and Technology; 2012–2015	Succeeded by Hiroshi Hase
