= 2005 Tokyo prefectural election =

Japanese election

- 3 July 2005

All 127 seats in the Tokyo Metropolitan Assembly 64 seats needed for a majority
- Turnout: 43.99%(▼6.09%)
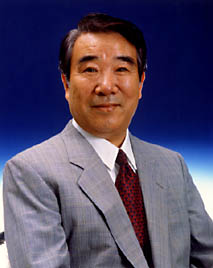

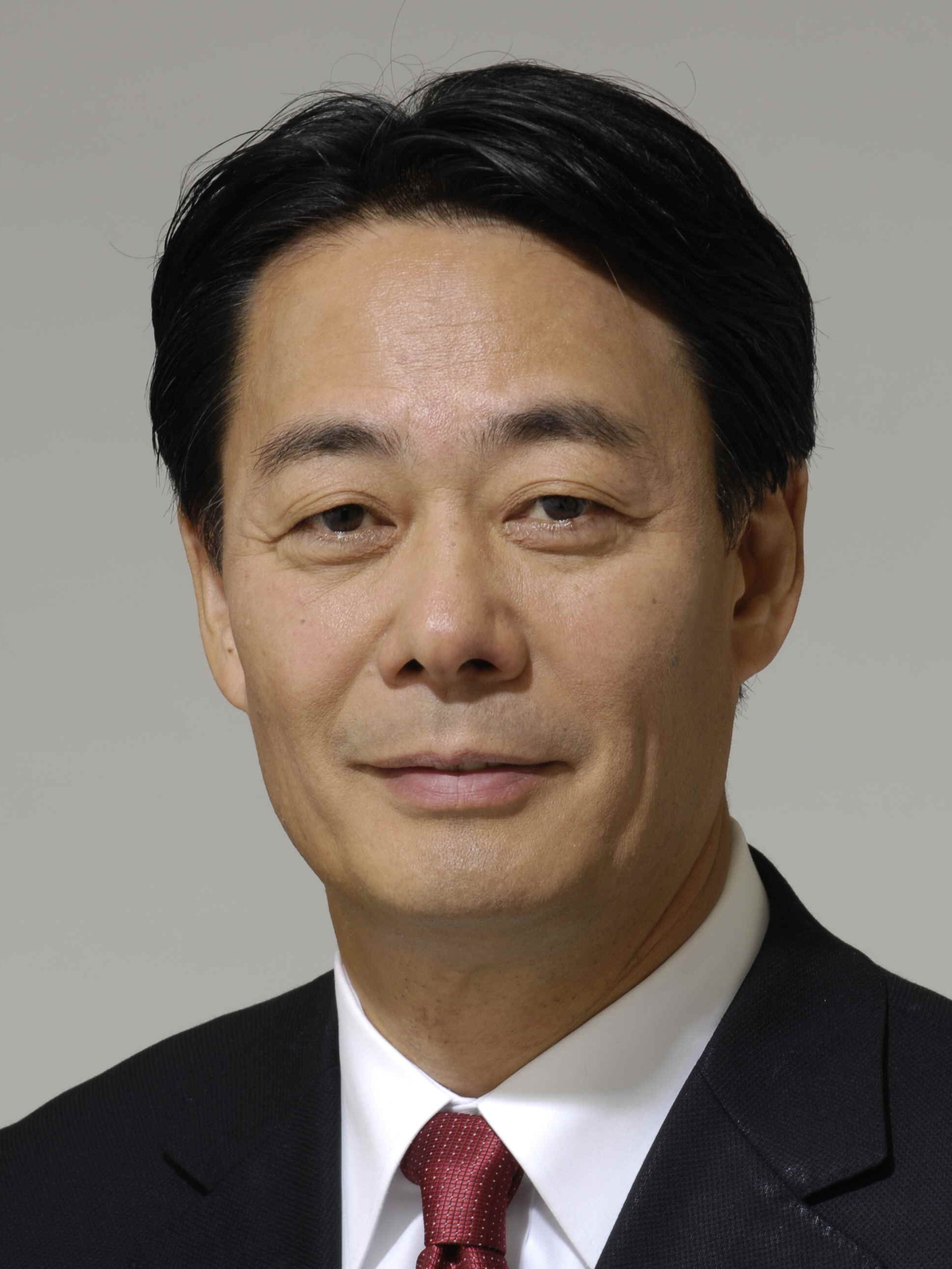

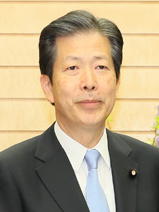
	First party	Second party	Third party
Leader	Eita Yashiro	Banri Kaieda	Natsuo Yamaguchi
Party	LDP	Democratic	Komeito
Last election	53	22	23
Seats before	53	22	22
Seats won	48	35	23
Seat change	▼5	▲13	▲1
Popular vote	1,339,548	1,070,893	786,292
Percentage	30.7%	24.5%	18.0%
	Fourth party	Fifth party
	共産	ネット
Leader	Yoshiharu Wakabayashi	Fumie Yamaguchi
Party	JCP	Tokyo Seikatsusha Network
Last election	15	6
Seats before	15	6
Seats won	13	3
Seat change	▼2	▼3
Popular vote	680,200	181,020
Percentage	15.6%	4.1%
Assembly President before election
Shigeru Uchida
LDP
Elected Assembly President
Chuuichi Kawashima
LDP

Prefectural elections were held in Tokyo for the city's Metropolitan Assembly on 3 July 2005. The election was a great success for the Democratic Party of Japan which won 16 additional seats, closing in on the Liberal Democratic Party.

== Results ==
Summary of the 3 July 2005 Tokyo Metropolitan Assembly election results
Parties	Candidates	Votes	%	Seats
Liberal Democratic Party of Japan (自由民主党, Jiyū Minshutō)	57	1,339,548	30.7	48
Democratic Party of Japan (民主党, Minshutō)	51	1,070,893	24.5	35
New Komeito party (公明党, Kōmeitō)	23	786,292	18.0	23
Japanese Communist Party (日本共産党, Nihon Kyōsan-tō)	43	680,200	15.6	13
Social Democratic Party (社民党 Shamin-tō)	1	10,165	0.2	0
Tokyo Seikatsusha Network (東京・生活者ネットワーク)	10	181,020	4.1	3
Gyokaku 110-ban (行革110番)	1	24,259	0.6	1
Others	4	27,784	0.6	0
Independents	30	248,999	5.7	4
Total (turnout 43.99%)	220	4,435,435	100.00	127
Sources:Tokyo electoral commission: 投開票結果 Archived 9 December 2012 at the Wayback Machine, JANJAN: 東京都議会議員選挙, Asahi Shimbun:

NB: Results are incomplete due to lack of sources.
