= Tokyo Seikatsusha Network =

Tokyo Seikatsusha Network 東京・生活者ネットワーク
- Founded: 1977
- Ideology: Localism; Consumer movement
- Political position: Centre-left
- Tokyo Metropolitan Assembly: 1 / 127

Website
- seikatsusha.net

The Tokyo Seikatsusha Network (東京・生活者ネットワーク, Tōkyō Seikatsusha Nettowāku) is a local Japanese political party affiliated with Tokyo Seikatsu Club, a consumers' cooperative. It is generally moderate left, and tends to appeal to the same voters as the Social Democratic Party of Japan and Constitutional Democratic Party of Japan.

== See also ==
- Liberalism in Japan
