= 2016 Tokyo 10th district by-election =

- 23 October 2016

Tokyo 10th district
- Turnout: 34.85
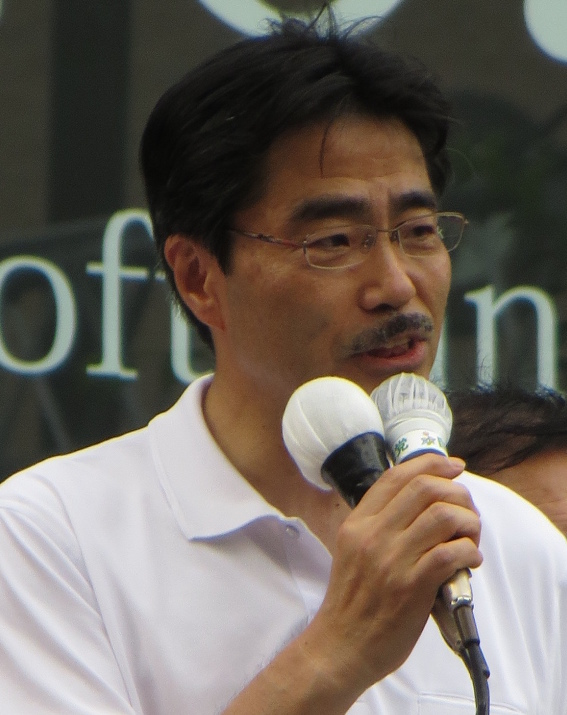

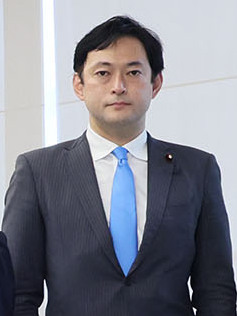
Nominee	Masaru Wakasa	Yosuke Suzuki
Party	LDP	Democratic
Popular vote	75,755	47,141
Percentage	60.26%	37.50%
Representative before election
Yuriko Koike
LDP
Elected Representative
Masaru Wakasa
LDP

A by-election for the Tokyo 10th district in the Japanese Japanese House of Representatives was held on 23 October 2016 to replace Yuriko Koike, who vacated the seat to contest the Tokyo gubernatorial election in July 2016. Koike, a member of the Liberal Democratic Party (LDP), had represented the district since the December 2012 general election and also served a previous term from 2005 to 2009. The election was won by LDP candidate Masaru Wakasa, an incumbent member for the Tokyo proportional representation block who had supported Koike during her gubernatorial campaign. A separate by-election for the Fukuoka 6th district was held on the same day.

== Background ==
Yuriko Koike, a Kansai native who had represented various Kansai districts in the House of Representatives since 1993, was parachuted into the Tokyo 10th district by LDP Prime Minister Junichiro Koizumi for the 2005 general election following the defection of Koki Kobayashi, who had held the seat for the LDP since its creation in 1996. Koike defeated Kobayashi in the 2005 election but lost to Democratic Party of Japan (DPJ) candidate Takako Ebata in 2009. Koike regained the seat from Ebata at the 2012 election and retained it at the 2014 general election.

Tokyo governor Yoichi Masuzoe resigned in June 2016 due to various problems with his use of public funds. On 29 June Koike held a press conference and stated her intention to contest the gubernatorial election to replace Masuzoe that was scheduled for 31 July. On 5 July Koike met with Nobuteru Ishihara, the head of the LDP's Tokyo branch, to formally request the LDP's endorsement. However, with the branch planning to endorse former Iwate Prefecture governor Hiroya Masuda, Ishihara's response to Koike was that the branch would make a decision after the national House of Councillors election on 10 July.

== Candidates ==
Candidates
Democratic	Yosuke Suzuki	Supported by the Communist, Liberal and Social Democratic parties.
Liberal Democratic	Masaru Wakasa	Incumbent representative for the Tokyo proportional representation block. Received official endorsement from Komeito.
Happiness Realization	Toshimitsu Yoshii	Listed as an independent in official documents

== Results ==
Tokyo 10th district by-election, 2016
Party	Candidate	Votes	%	±%
LDP	Masaru Wakasa (endorsed by Komeito)	75,755	60.26	
Democratic	Yosuke Suzuki	47,141	37.50	
Happiness Realization	Toshimitsu Yoshii	2,824	2.25	
Turnout		127,965	34.85	−18.71
