= 2017 Japanese general election =

- 22 October 2017

All 465 seats in the House of Representatives 233 seats needed for a majority
- Turnout: 53.68% (▲1.03pp; Const. votes); 53.68% (▲1.03pp; PR votes)
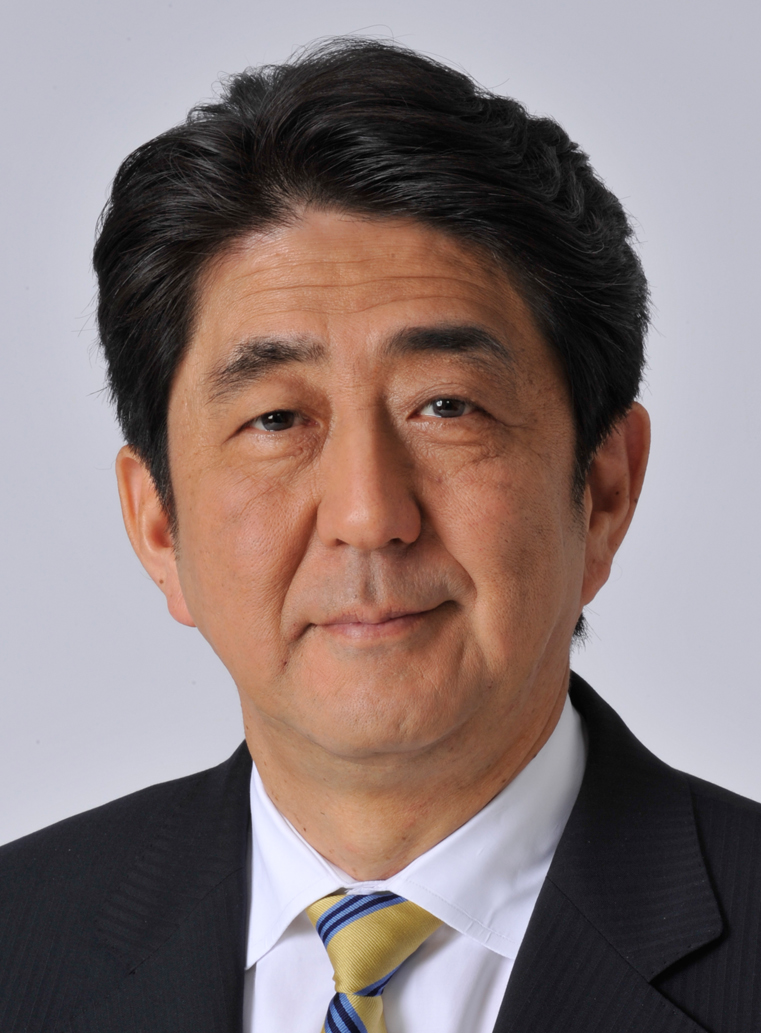

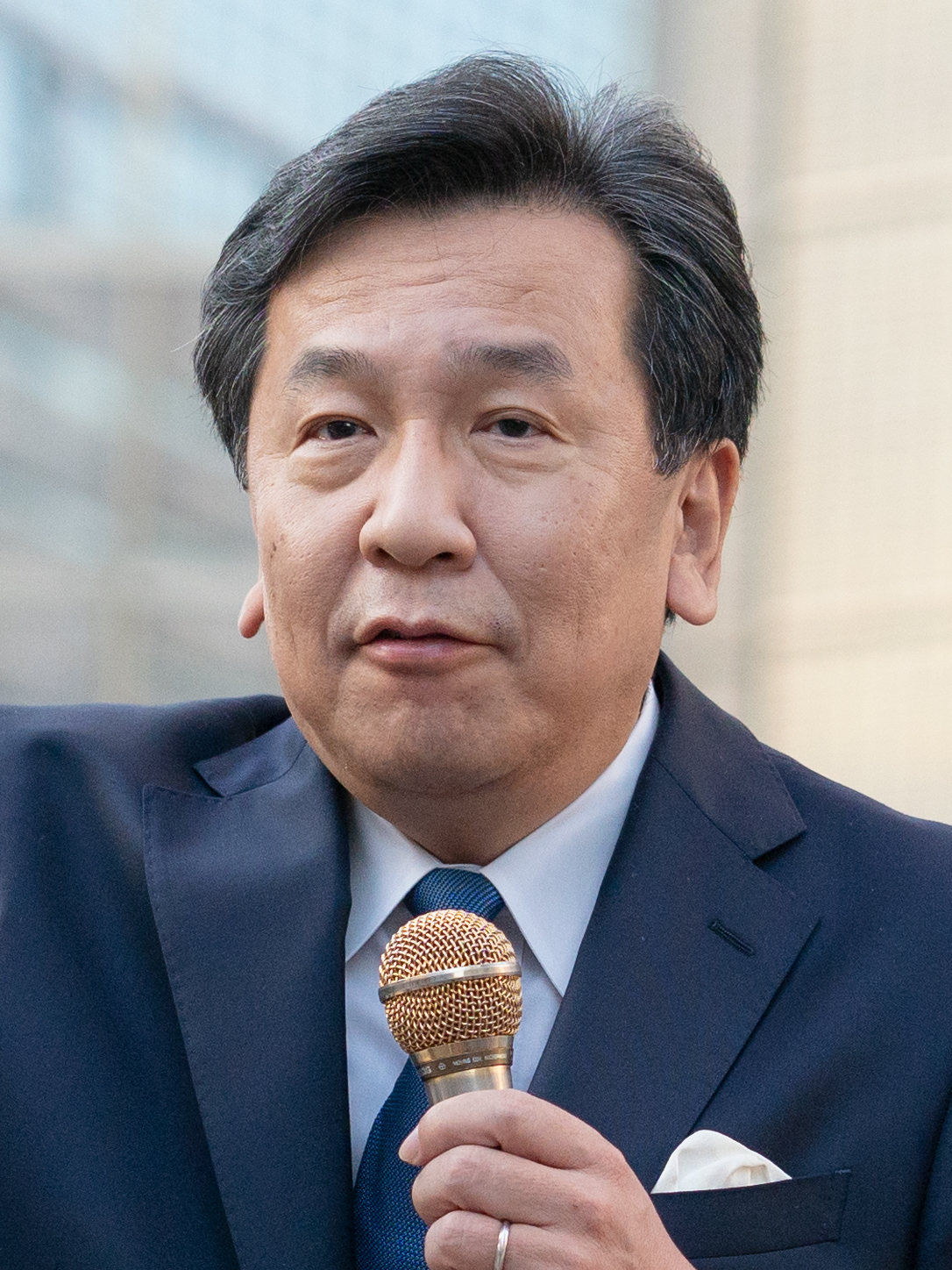

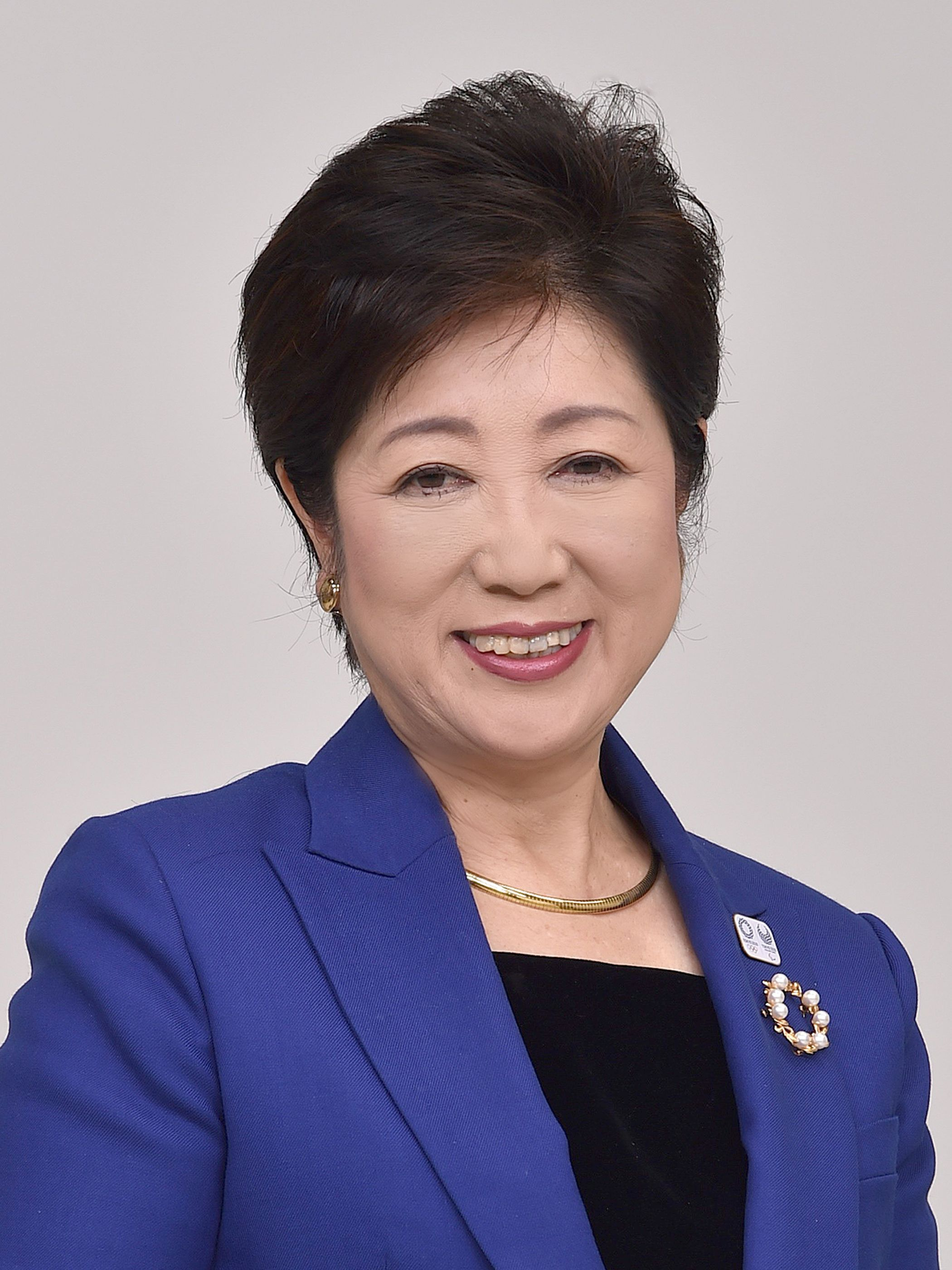

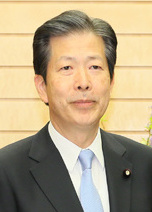

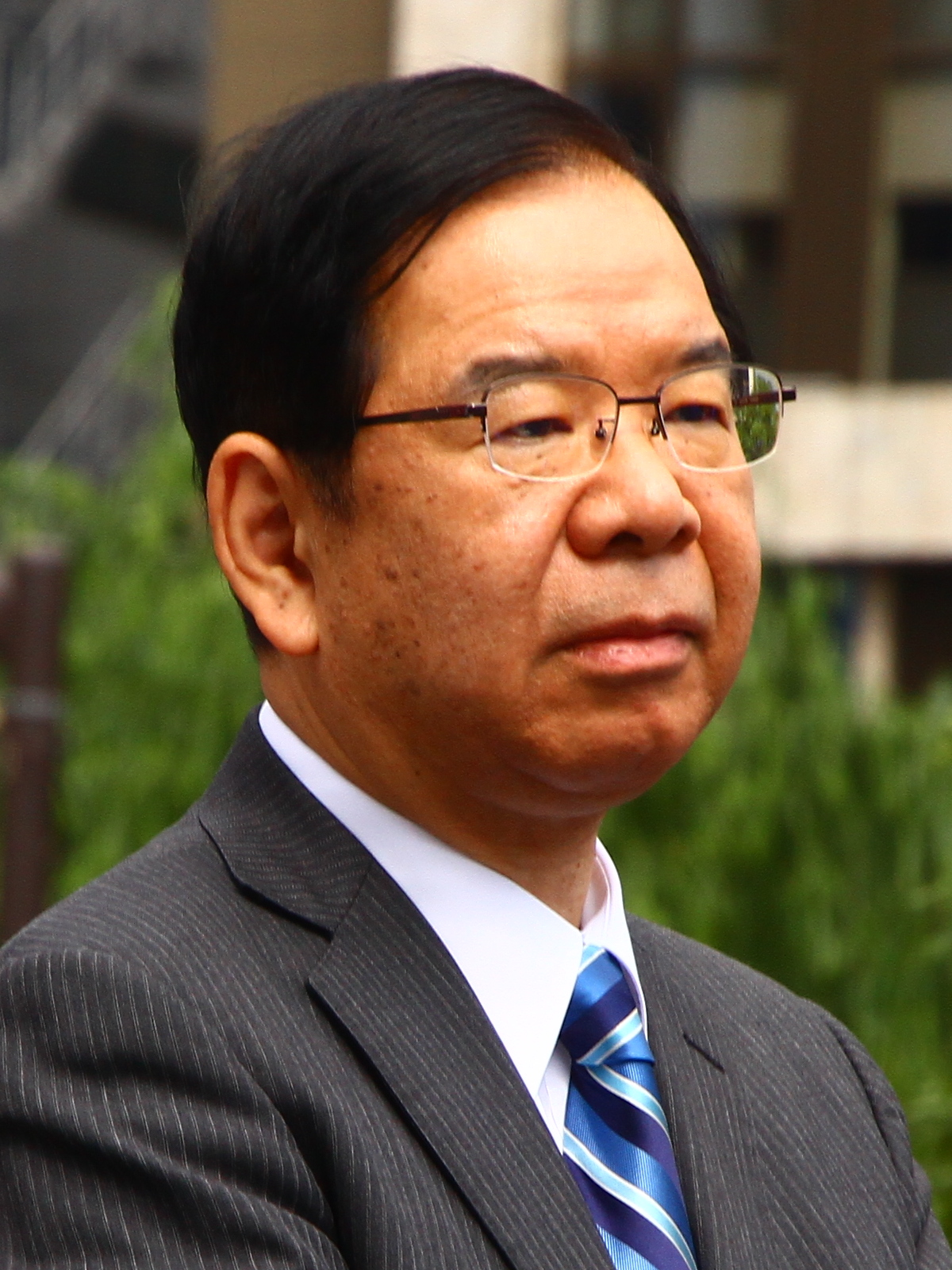

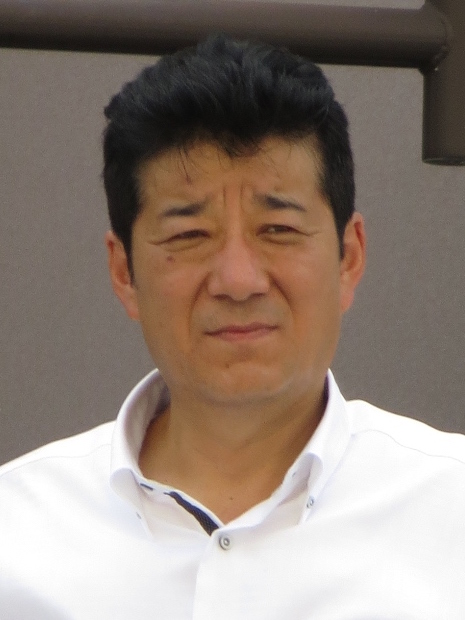
	First party	Second party	Third party
Leader	Shinzo Abe	Yukio Edano	Yuriko Koike
Party	LDP	CDP	Kibō no Tō
Leader since	26 September 2012	2 October 2017	25 September 2017
Leader's seat	Yamaguchi 4th	Saitama 5th	Did not stand (Note: Served as Governor of Tokyo)
Last election	291 seats	Did not exist	73 seats (Note: Democratic Party (2016))
Seats before	284	15	57
Seats won	284	55	50
Seat change	▼7	New	▼23
Constituency vote	26,500,777	4,726,326	11,437,602
% and swing	47.82% (▼0.28pp)	8.53% (New)	20.64% (▼1.87pp)
Regional vote	18,555,717	11,084,890	9,677,524
% and swing	33.28% (▲0.17pp)	19.88% (New)	17.36% (▼0.97pp)
	Fourth party	Fifth party	Sixth party
Leader	Natsuo Yamaguchi	Kazuo Shii	Ichirō Matsui
Party	Komeito	JCP	Ishin
Leader since	8 September 2009	24 November 2000	12 December 2015
Leader's seat	Did not stand (Note: Sits in the House of Councillors for the Tokyo at-large district)	Southern Kanto PR	Did not stand (Note: Served as Governor of Osaka)
Last election	35 seats	21 seats	Did not exist
Seats before	35	21	14
Seats won	29	12	11
Seat change	▼6	▼9	New
Constituency vote	832,453	4,998,932	1,765,053
% and swing	1.50% (▲0.05pp)	9.02% (▼4.28pp)	3.18% (New)
Regional vote	6,977,712	4,404,081	3,387,097
% and swing	12.51% (▼1.20pp)	7.90% (▼3.47pp)	6.07% (New)
- Districts and PR districts, shaded according to winners' vote strength
Prime Minister before election
Shinzo Abe
LDP
Elected Prime Minister
Shinzo Abe
LDP

General elections were held in Japan on 22 October 2017. Voting took place in all Representatives constituencies of Japan – 289 single-member districts and eleven proportional blocks – in order to appoint all 465 members (down from 475) of the House of Representatives, the lower house of the then 707-member bicameral National Diet of Japan. Incumbent prime minister Shinzo Abe's governing coalition of the Liberal Democratic Party (LDP) and the Komeito party retained their seats in signs of what was perceived as weak opposition. Abe won his fourth term in office and held on to the two-thirds supermajority in order to implement policies on revising the war-renouncing Article 9 of the Japanese Constitution.

The snap elections were called in the midst of the North Korea missile threat and with the largest opposition party, the Democratic Party, in disarray. Just hours before Abe's announcement of the snap election on 25 September, Governor of Tokyo Yuriko Koike launched a new conservative reformist party Kibō no Tō, the Party of Hope, which was seen as a viable alternative to the ruling coalition. It soon led to the dissolution of the Democratic Party and its party members defecting to the Kibō no Tō. However, the liberal wing of the Democratic Party, whose members Koike refused to nominate, formed the Constitutional Democratic Party of Japan (CDP) led by Yukio Edano, splitting the opposition in half. The elections turned into a three-way contest as the CDP joined with the Japanese Communist Party and Social Democratic Party on a common platform opposing the constitutional revision. While Kibō no Tō fell short of expectation, the CDP surged in the polls in the last days before the elections and beat Kibō no Tō to emerge as the largest opposition party.

Despite being disrupted by Typhoon Lan, the elections saw a slight increase in turnout rate of 53.68 percent but still was the second lowest in postwar Japan. The lowest ever turnout was recorded in 2014. They were also the first elections after the voting age was lowered from 20 to 18. Abe also became the first prime minister to win three consecutive general elections since 1953 and the first LDP leader to do so. He became the longest-serving prime minister in the history of the country in August 2020, but resigned shortly after achieving this due to health issues.

== Background ==
The House of Representatives has a fixed term of four years. Under the postwar constitution drafted in 1947, the interpretation of Article 7 states that the cabinet may instruct the Emperor to dissolve the House of Representatives before the end of term at will. Elections must be held within 40 days after dissolution. In June 2015, the Public Office Election Law was amended to lower the voting age from 20 to 18 years of age.

As of June 2015, the largest opposition party Democratic Party of Japan was reportedly preparing a roster of up to 250 candidates so as to be prepared in the event that the next general election was to be held alongside the House of Councillors election in the summer of 2016, before it merged with the Japan Innovation Party to form the Democratic Party in March 2016. The Democratic Party suffered a considerable defeat at the hands of the ruling coalition in the election, in which the Abe government took almost two-thirds of the seats.

In January 2017, Tokyo Governor Yuriko Koike established a new local party, Tomin First, to challenge the establishment Liberal Democratic Party in the Tokyo metropolitan election to be held in July. Tomin First won a resounding victory in the election, which came in the wake of the Moritomo Gakuen and Kake Gakuen scandals calling into question the propriety of the Abe government's decision making. After the election, Defense Minister Tomomi Inada resigned in connection with another scandal involving the Japan Self-Defense Forces concealing evidence of a battle in South Sudan. Meanwhile, the main national opposition Democratic Party was severely hurt by the resignation of its leader Renho in July, as well as several high-profile defections.

The government of Prime Minister Shinzo Abe began publicly discussing the possibility of an election in mid-September 2017, as the North Korea crisis was ongoing. Continuing the momentum of her Tokyo election victory, Koike announced the formation of a new national political party, Kibō no Tō (Party of Hope), on 25 September. Abe called the general election just hours later on the same day. Soon after the Party of Hope was established, Democratic Party leader Seiji Maehara sought to merge with Kibō no Tō. Maehara's decision was strongly criticised by the liberal wing of the party, whose candidacies were rejected by Koike. The liberal wing surrounding the deputy president Yukio Edano announced the formation of the Constitutional Democratic Party of Japan on 2 October 2017. Opposition politicians claim Abe called the election partly to evade further questioning in parliament over his alleged misuse of power in securing approval for a veterinary college campus in Imabari.

One wedge issue between the two major coalitions is the scheduled consumption tax hike in October 2019. The LDP coalition advocates keeping the tax hike and using the funds for child care and education, while the Kibo coalition advocates freezing the tax hike. Nonetheless, Koike stated on 8 October that she was open to the option of a grand coalition with the LDP.

The LDP fielded 332 candidates, while Komeito fielded 53, Kibō no Tō fielded 235, and Nippon Ishin fielded 52. The Constitutional Democratic Party, Japanese Communist Party and Social Democratic Party joined forces to support a total number of 342 candidates on the common platform of opposing the revision the pacifist Article 9 of the Constitution of Japan and the new national security legislation.

Several U.S.-Japan policy experts, including James Zumwalt and Michael Green, opined in October that the election was unlikely to have a major impact on policy as the LDP was expected to retain control; however, there was anxiety about the prospect of a leadership vacuum if Abe was eventually forced to resign as head of the LDP.

== Political parties and candidates ==
Parties	Leader	Ideology	Seats		Status
Parties	Leader	Ideology	Last election	Before election	Status
Liberal Democratic Party	Shinzo Abe	Conservatism	291 / 465	284 / 465	Governing coalition
Democratic Party	Seiji Maehara	Liberalism	73 / 465 (Note: as Democratic Party of Japan)	24 / 465	Opposition
Democratic Party	Seiji Maehara	Liberalism	41 / 465 (Note: as Japan Innovation Party)	24 / 465	Opposition
Kibō no Tō	Yuriko Koike	Conservatism	Did not exist	57 / 465	Opposition
Komeito	Natsuo Yamaguchi	Conservatism	35 / 465	34 / 465	Governing coalition
Japanese Communist Party	Kazuo Shii	Communism	21 / 465	21 / 465	Opposition
Constitutional Democratic Party of Japan	Yukio Edano	Liberalism	Did not exist	15 / 465	Opposition
Nippon Ishin no Kai	Ichirō Matsui	Conservatism	Did not exist	14 / 465	Opposition
Social Democratic Party	Tadatomo Yoshida	Social democracy	2 / 465	2 / 465	Opposition

Numbers of candidates by party
Party	Before election	Const.	PR	Total
LDP	290	277	313	332
Kibo	57	198	234	235
Komei	34	9	44	53
JCP	21	206	65	243
CDP	15	63	77	78
Ishin	14	47	52	52
SDP	2	19	21	21
Kokoro	0	0	2	2
Others	0	44	47	91
Ind.	39	73	–	73
Total	472	936	855	1,180

=== Ruling coalition ===
- The Liberal Democratic Party (LDP), the conservative party led by Prime Minister Shinzo Abe who has been in power since the 2012 House of Representative election. The LDP currently enjoys the two-thirds majority with its coalition partner Komeito which allows the government to push forward the revision of the war-renouncing Article 9 of the Japanese Constitution.
- Komeito, a nominally Buddhist party led by Natsuo Yamaguchi, is the junior coalition partner of the incumbent government. Holding 35 seats in the House of Representatives, the party is considered as social conservative and closely associated with the Soka Gakkai religious movement.

=== Koike's coalition ===
- Kibō no Tō, also known as the Party of Hope, is the brand new conservative reformist party launched by Yuriko Koike, former LDP minister and incumbent governor of Tokyo, on 25 September 2017 ahead of the general election. The new party attracted former members of the LDP as well as the conservative wing of the Democratic Party, the largest opposition party at the time, led by Seiji Maehara to join with the aims of overthrowing the Abe government. Three members of the Ichirō Ozawa's Liberal Party also decided run under Koike's banner. Despite being tipped as the first Japan's woman Prime Minister, Koike has expressed no intention to run in the general election and stated that her party would not name a prime ministerial candidate during the election. The party has promised to freeze the planned consumption tax increase and promote debate on the constitutional revision.
- Nippon Ishin no Kai, previously known as Initiatives from Osaka, is a Kansai-based party led by Governor of Osaka Ichirō Matsui. It split from the Japan Innovation Party in 2015. Having similar policies with Kibō no Tō, the party has agreed to cooperate with Koike in the coming election.

=== Pacifist coalition ===
- The Japanese Communist Party (JCP), the left-wing party led by Kazuo Shii, saw its recent resurgence in the 2014 House of Representative election due to its firm pacifist stance against the revision of Article 9 of the Constitution. The party currently is the second largest opposition party, holding 21 seats in the House of Representatives. The party forms an alliance with two other left-leaning parties, the Constitutional Democrats and the Social Democrats, and plans to field 243 candidates.
- The Constitutional Democratic Party of Japan (CDP), a brand new centre-left social liberal party formed by Yukio Edano on 2 October 2017 by the liberal wing of the Democratic Party, the then largest opposition party, after Kibō no Tō refused to nominate the liberal candidates of the Democratic Party when the party leader Seiji Maehara decided to join Kibō no Tō with the party. The party calls for Japan to phase out nuclear power, opposes the constitutional revision and the new national security legislation with two other left-leaning opposition parties. The party plans to field 78 candidates in the coming election.
- The Social Democratic Party (SDP) is the centre-left social democratic party led by Tadatomo Yoshida, which currently holds 2 seats in the House of Representatives. It opposes the revision of the pacifist Article 9 of the Constitution, and forms an alliance with two other left-leaning to stop the constitutional revisionists from winning a two-thirds majority.

=== Other parties ===
- The Party for Japanese Kokoro (PJK), formerly called the Party for Future Generations, currently holds no seat in the House of Representatives after its two members left to rejoin the Liberal Democratic Party in 2015. It is led by Masashi Nakano after its former leader Kyoko Nakayama left to join Kibō no Tō in late September and provides confidence and supply to the Abe cabinet. The party was formed by the right-wing nationalist wing led by Shintarō Ishihara who split from the Japan Restoration Party in 2014.

=== Gender representation ===
Fewer than 20% of the 1,180 candidates that ran in the election were women. 9% of current elected figures are women, Japan ranks 165th out of 193 countries on this aspect.

== Opinion polls ==
=== Voting intention (PR blocks) ===
Date	Polling Firm/Source	LDP	DP	Komei	JCP	PJK	SDP	LP	Ishin	Kibō	CDP	Oth.	Und.	No Answer	Lead
17–19 Oct	Yomiuri Shimbun	33		8	6				5	13	17	2	16		16
17–18 Oct	Asahi Shimbun	34		7	5	1	1		4	11	13	1	23		21
14–15 Oct	FNN & Sankei Shimbun	32.9		8.5	5.4	0.9	1.0		4.8	15.0	14.6	4.8	12.1		17.9
6–9 Oct	Jiji Press	30.7		5.9	4.5		1.2		3.1	11.8	4.4		33.2		18.9
7–8 Oct	Yomiuri Shimbun	32		5	4	0	1		3	13	7	1	27	6	19
3–4 Oct	Asahi Shimbun	35		7	6	0	1	1	4	12	7	0	27		23
2 Oct	Liberal wing of the Democratic Party splits to form the Constitutional Democratic Party of Japan														
30 Sep–1 Oct	Kyodo News	24.1		4.9	4.9	0.4	0.1	0.3	2.4	14.8		0	42.8		9.3
30 Sep–1 Oct	ANN	29		6	6		1	1	2	14		0	39		15
29 Sep–1 Oct	Seijiyama	22.7		3.4	6.3	(Oth.)	2.1	(Oth.)	3.2	11.3		0.9	32.4	3.6	11.4
28–29 Sep	Yomiuri Shimbun	34		6	5	0	1	1	2	19		0	25	7	15
28 Sep	The Democratic Party dissolves and announces its candidacies under Kibō no Tō banner														
26–27 Sep	Asahi Shimbun	32	8	6	5	0	2	1	3	13		1	29		19
26–27 Sep	Mainichi Shimbun	29	8	5	5	0	0	1	3	18		16			11
25 Sep	Prime Minister Shinzo Abe announces his intention to seek a general election to be held on 22 October 2017														
25 Sep	Governor of Tokyo Yuriko Koike launches the party Kibō no Tō														
23–24 Sep	Kyodo News	27.0	8.0	4.6	3.5	0	0.3	0.1	2.2	6.2			42.2		19
22–24 Sep	The Nikkei & TV Tokyo (Note: This poll is not specific to the PR blocks, but is rather a general voting-intention poll. "At the next elections, what is the party that you would like to vote for, or to which your preferred candidate belongs?")	44	8	3	5	0	1	1	3	8		5	20		24

=== Voting intention (districts) ===
Date	Polling Firm/Source	LDP	DP	Komei	JCP	PJK	SDP	LP	Ishin	Kibō	CDP	Oth.	Ind.	Und. + No Answer	Lead
17–18 Oct	Asahi Shimbun	33		3	4		1		2	9	7	0	2	39	24
3–4 Oct	Asahi Shimbun	31		4	4	0	0	1	2	10	4	0	0	44	21
26–27 Sep	Asahi Shimbun	31	9	3	4	0	1	0	2	6		1	1	42	22
23–24 Sep	Kyodo News	28.1	6.4	3.8	-	-	-	-	-	6.6		-	-	-	21.5

=== Party approval ===
Date	Polling Firm/Source	LDP	DP	Komei	JCP	PJK	SDP	LP	Ishin	Kibō	CDP	Oth.	No party	Und. + No Answer	Lead
17–19 Oct	The Nikkei	41								11	13		11		28
17–18 Oct	Asahi Shimbun	32	1	4	3	0	1	0	2	6	7	1	27	16	5
14–15 Oct	FNN	34.5	0.7	5.4	3.6	0.2	0.5	0.0	3.3	9.5	11.6	1.5	27.9	1.3	6.6
14–15 Oct	JNN	32.8	1.2	3.8	3.2	0.1	0.5	0.1	1.8	5.2	7.3	0.8	38.1	5.3	5.3
13–15 Oct	NHK	32.8	1.0	4.3	3.4	0.1	0.6	0.2	1.7	5.4	6.6		34.0		1.2
10–11 Oct	The Nikkei	39		5	5	0	1		3	13	11		11		28
7–9 Oct	NHK	31.2	1.6	3.8	2.7	0.0	0.5	0.0	1.3	4.8	4.4	0.4	39.1	10.0	7.9
6–9 Oct	Jiji Press	23.9	1.6	3.6	2.5	0.1	0.2	0.0	1.4	2.6	2.7		57.2		33.3
7–8 Oct	Yomiuri Shimbun	33	1	3	3		0	0	1	8	4	0	38	8	5
3–4 Oct	Asahi Shimbun	30	2	5	2	0	0	0	1	5	3	1	30	21	Tied
30 Sep – 1 Oct	ANN	39.6	7.1	4.6	5.8		1.9	0.6	2.8	9.6		0.0	28.0		11.6
29 Sep – 1 Oct	NHK	30.8	3.9	3.8	3.3		0.6	0.3	1.0	5.4			40.4		9.6
28–29 Sep	Yomiuri Shimbun	32	4	4	3		0	0	1	9		0	40	7	8
26–27 Sep	Asahi Shimbun	31	6	4	3	0	1	0	1	3		1	32	18	1
26–27 Sep	Mainichi Shimbun	28	5	4	4	0	0	1	2	13		1	39		11
22–24 Sep	The Nikkei & TV Tokyo	44	7	3	5	0	1	0	2			0	32	6	12
16–17 Sep	ANN	46.2	11.3	3.5	5.7	0.0	0.8	0.3	1.8			1.4	29.0		17.2
8–11 Sep	Jiji Press	23.7	4.3	4.9	1.3	0.0	0.1	0.0	1.0				62.9		39.2
8–10 Sep	NHK	37.7	6.7	3.1	2.6	0.0	0.5	0.3	1.1			0.2	40.8	7.1	3.1
8–10 Sep	Yomiuri Shimbun	40	5	3	3		0	0	1			0	45	2	5
25-27 Aug	The Nikkei & TV Tokyo	41	7	3	4	0	1	0	2			1	36	5	5
19-20 Aug	FNN	33.0	6.9	3.1	3.9	0.2	0.8	1.0	2.9			3.2	44.6	0.4	11.6
5-6 Aug	Asahi Shimbun	33	6	3	3	0	0	0	1			1	46	7	13
5-6 Aug	ANN	38.1	10.8	3.9	5.6	0.1	1.5	0.8	1.4			0.7	37.1		1.0
4-6 Aug	NHK	34.8	5.7	3.7	2.8	0.2	0.9	0.3	0.5			0.5	45.7	4.8	10.9
3-6 Aug	Jiji Press	25.7	3.2	2.5	2.3	0.0	0.8	0.2	0.8				62.2		36.5
3-4 Aug	The Nikkei & TV Tokyo	37	8	5	5	0	1	0	2			0	36	6	1
3-4 Aug	Yomiuri Shimbun	36	6	3	3		1	0	1			0	45	4	9
3-4 Aug	Mainichi Shimbun	26	7	5	5	0	1	0	3			1	47		21
3-4 Aug	Kyodo News	39.0	7.3	5.9	5.1	0.2	0.4	0.3	2.6				37.9		1.1
22-23 Jul	Mainichi Shimbun	25	5	3	5	0	1	1	2			2	53		28
22-23 Jul	FNN	29.1	7.0	5.3	4.6	0.2	1.3	0.8	3.2			2.0	45.7	0.8	16.6
7-10 Jul	Jiji Press	21.1	3.8	3.2	2.1	0.0	0.3	0.0	1.1				65.3		44.2
8-9 Jul	Asahi Shimbun	30	5	4	4	0	1	0	1			1	47	7	17
7-9 Jul	NTV	35.6	9.2	3.7	5.6	0.0	1.5	0.4	1.1			0.1	38.1	4.6	2.5
7-9 Jul	Yomiuri Shimbun	31	6	4	4	0	0	0	1			2	47	4	16
7-9 Jul	NHK	30.7	5.8	4.1	3.3	0.2	0.3	0.5	1.2			0.3	47.0	5.8	16.3
17-18 Jun	Mainichi Shimbun	27	8	3	4	0	1	1	2			1	47		20
17-18 Jun	FNN	36.0	8.3	4.1	5.6	0.2	0.8	1.3	3.5			1.7	38.1	0.4	2.1
17-18 Jun	Yomiuri Shimbun	41	7	3	3	0	1	0	1			0	40	4	1
17-18 Jun	Asahi Shimbun	34	8	4	4	0	1	0	1			0	41	7	7
16-18 Jun	NTV	38.5	11.0	5.1	4.1	0.0	1.4	0.1	1.1			0.3	33.4	5.0	5.1
9-11 Jun	NHK	36.4	7.9	4.2	2.7	0.0	0.9	0.4	1.2			0.3	40.8	5.1	4.4
13–14 May	FNN	41.6	8.0	2.9	4.3	0.6	0.8	0.8	2.9			2.1	35.6	0.4	6.0
12–14 May	Yomiuri Shimbun	43	6	2	2		0	0	1			1	39	5	4
12–14 May	NHK	37.5	7.3	3.8	2.7	0.1	1.0	0.3	1.0			0.1	38.4	7.5	0.9
14-16 Apr	Yomiuri Shimbun	44	6	3	3		0	0	2			0	38	4	6
7-9 Apr	NHK	38.1	6.7	3.8	3.2	0.1	0.6	0.5	1.1			0.2	38.7	7.0	0.6
18-19 Mar	Yomiuri Shimbun	40	7	2	3		1	0	2			0	43	2	3
10-12 Mar	NHK	36.9	7.6	4.1	2.8	0.0	1.1	0.1	1.6			0.4	38.9	6.6	2.0
17-19 Feb	Yomiuri Shimbun	43	6	4	3	0	0	0	1			0	40	2	3
11-12 Feb	NHK	38.2	6.4	2.8	4.4		0.7	0.4				0.3	40.1	5.2	1.9
27-29 Jan	Yomiuri Shimbun	40	7	3	4	0	0	0	1			0	42	2	2
7-9 Jan	NHK	38.3	8.7	3.5	3.2		0.9	0.0				0.3	38.3	5.3	Tied
2017
8-10 Oct	NHK	37.1	9.9	3.9	3.9	0.0	1.1	0.1	1.1			0.2	37.8	4.9	0.7
7-9 Oct	Yomiuri Shimbun	40	7	3	3	0	1	0	2			1	39	4	1
9-11 Sep	Yomiuri Shimbun	46.0	8.0	3.0	4.0	0.0	1.0	0.0	3.0			1.0	31.0	2.0	15.0
9-11 Sep	NHK	40.2	8.3	4.3	2.5	0.2	0.4	0.0	1.9			0.2	36.0	6.1	4.2
4-6 Mar	Yomiuri Shimbun	37.0	8.0	3.0	4.0	0.0	0.0	0.0	1.0			0.0	43.0	2.0	6.0
12-14 Feb	Yomiuri Shimbun	42.0	7.0	3.0	3.0		0.0		1.0			0.0	40.0	3.0	2.0
5-7 Feb	NHK	37.6	9.6	3.6	3.9	0.2	0.2	0.0	1.6			0.1	35.1	7.4	2.5
30-31 Jan	Yomiuri Shimbun	40.0	7.0	4.0	4.0	0.0	0.0	0.0	2.0			0.0	39.0	3.0	1.0
9-11 Jan	NHK	37.5	8.1	4.3	4.2	0.0	0.6	0.3	1.9			0.2	33.1	9.4	4.4
8-10 Jan	Yomiuri Shimbun	40.0	8.0	4.0	4.0	0.0	0.0	0.0	2.0			0.0	37.0	4.0	3.0
2016
17-18 Dec	Yomiuri Shimbun	37.0	9.0	5.0	4.0	0.0	1.0	0.0	2.0			0.0	39.0	0.0	2.0
11-13 Dec	NHK	37.5	8.5	4.7	5.0	0.0	0.5	0.1	1.8			0.2	34.3	7.0	3.2
4-6 Dec	Yomiuri Shimbun	36.0	7.0	3.0	4.0	0.0	1.0	0.0	4.0			0.0	43.0	2.0	7.0
6-8 Nov	Yomiuri Shimbun	40.0	7.0	3.0	5.0	0.0	0.0	0.0	2.0			0.0	39.0	2.0	1.0
6-8 Nov	NHK	37.1	8.4	3.4	4.1	0.0	0.5	0.3	1.1			0.1	36.3	8.2	0.8
10-12 Oct	NHK	35.6	8.6	3.3	4.2	0.2	0.9	0.3				0.1	35.7	10.3	0.1
7-8 Oct	Yomiuri Shimbun	39.0	10.0	3.0	3.0		1.0	0.0				0.0	39.0	1.0	Tied
19-20 Sep	Yomiuri Shimbun	33.0	11.0	3.0	4.0	0.0	1.0	1.0				0.0	42.0	3.0	9.0
11–13 Sep	NHK	34.7	9.8	3.7	4.0	0.1	0.6	0.2				0.6	36.2	9.0	1.5
15-16 Aug	Yomiuri Shimbun	37.0	10.0	3.0	4.0		1.0	0.0				0.0	39.0	3.0	2.0
7–9 Aug	NHK	34.3	10.9	3.0	4.2	0.2	0.7	0.0				0.1	34.5	9.6	0.2
24-26 Jul	Yomiuri Shimbun	36.0	8.0	3.0	5.0		0.0	0.0				0.0	41.0	3.0	5.0
18–19 Jul	Asahi Shimbun	31.0	9.0	4.0	4.0	0.0	1.0	0.0				0.0	41.0	7.0	10.0
11–12 Jul	Asahi Shimbun	32.0	8.0	4.0	4.0	1.0	0.0	0.0				0.0	38.0	10.0	6.0
10–12 Jul	NHK	34.7	7.7	4.2	3.3	0.1	0.7	0.4				0.1	36.8	9.5	2.1
3-5 Jul	Yomiuri Shimbun	35.0	9.0	4.0	3.0	0.0	1.0					0.0	44.0	1.0	9.0
20–21 Jun	Asahi Shimbun	36.0	7.0	3.0	3.0	0.0	1.0	0.0				0.0	41.0	7.0	5.0
5-7 Jun	Yomiuri Shimbun	38.0	7.0	3.0	4.0	0.0	0.0	0.0				0.0	42.0	2.0	4.0
5–7 Jun	NHK	35.8	9.4	3.6	4.4	0.0	0.9	0.0				0.2	33.9	9.3	1.9
16–17 May	Asahi Shimbun	39.0	7.0	3.0	4.0	0.0	0.0	0.0				1.0	33.0	10.0	6.0
8–10 May	Yomiuri Shimbun	43.0	10.0	4.0	4.0	0.0	1.0	0.0				0.0	35.0	2.0	8.0
8–10 May	NHK	37.5	7.8	5.3	3.5	0.0	0.8	0.2				0.0	34.7	8.4	2.8
18–19 Apr	Asahi Shimbun	36.0	7.0	4.0	5.0	0.0	1.0	0.0				0.0	34.0	10.0	2.0
10–12 Apr	NHK	37.8	9.2	4.1	4.8	0.2	0.9	0.1				0.3	29.2	9.9	8.6
3-5 Apr	Yomiuri Shimbun	41.0	7.0	4.0	4.0	0.0	1.0	0.0				0.0	40.0	1.0	1.0
14–15 Mar	Asahi Shimbun	38.0	8.0	3.0	3.0	0.0	1.0	0.0				1.0	37.0	8.0	1.0
6–8 Mar	NHK	36.7	10.9	3.8	4.6	0.0	1.6	0.3				0.3	31.8	8.1	4.9
28 Jan-28 Feb	Yomiuri Shimbun	43.0	9.0	4.0	4.0	1.0	1.0	1.0				0.0	30.0	1.0	13.0
14–15 Feb	Asahi Shimbun	40.0	7.0	4.0	4.0	0.0	1.0	0.0				1.0	35.0	7.0	5.0
6–8 Feb	NHK	41.2	10.3	4.9	4.2	0.1	0.7	0.0				0.1	29.7	6.5	11.5
6-7 Feb	Yomiuri Shimbun	42.0	11.0	3.0	4.0	0.0	1.0	0.0				0.0	35.0	1.0	8.0
17–18 Jan	Asahi Shimbun	33.0	9.0	4.0	4.0	0.0	1.0	0.0				1.0	38.0	7.0	5.0
10–12 Jan	NHK	39.4	9.2	4.0	3.7	0.4	0.8	0.1				0.2	31.9	7.7	7.5
9-11 Jan	Yomiuri Shimbun	41.0	8.0	3.0	5.0	0.0	1.0	0.0				0.0	38.0	1.0	3.0
2015
24-25 Dec	Yomiuri Shimbun	36.0	11.0	5.0	6.0	0.0	1.0	0.0				1.0	32.0	3.0	4.0
15–16 Dec	Asahi Shimbun	35.0	7.0	4.0	4.0	0.0	1.0	0.0				1.0	33.0	12.0	2.0
14 Dec 2014	General Election	33.1	18.3	13.7	11.4	2.7	2.5	1.9	—N/a	—N/a	—N/a	0.7	—N/a	—N/a	14.9

=== Preferred prime minister ===
Date	Polling Firm/Source	Abe	Koike	Oth.	Und. + No Answer	Lead
14–15 Oct	FNN & Sankei Shimbun	54.0	26.5	19.5		27.5
30 Sep – 1 Oct	Kyodo News	45.9	33.0		21.1	12.9

=== Preferred outcome ===
Date	Polling Firm/Source	Government gains seats	LDP re-election	Balanced	Opposition gains seats	Change in government	Und. + No Answer
17–18 Oct	Asahi Shimbun		37			36	27
14–15 Oct	FNN & Sankei Shimbun		50.5			40.6	8.9
14–15 Oct	JNN	35			47		18
13–15 Oct	NHK	22			33		39
7–9 Oct	NHK	21			32		41
7–8 Oct	Yomiuri Shimbun		44			42 (Note: This response was phrased as "The government loses its majority", which would include both those wishing for a change in government, as well as those wishing for the coalition to negotiate with other parties)	14
3–4 Oct	Asahi Shimbun		43			33	24
30 Sep – 1 Oct	ANN		44			38	18
30 Sep – 1 Oct	Kyodo News		27.4	48.6		16.9	
29 Sep – 1 Oct	NHK	20			33		42
26–27 Sep	Mainichi Shimbun	34			49		

=== Cabinet approval / disapproval ratings ===
Date	Polling Firm/Source	PM	Approval	Disapproval	Und. + No Answer
17–19 Oct	The Nikkei	Shinzō Abe	46	44	22
17–18 Oct	Asahi Shimbun	Shinzō Abe	38	40	22
15–16 Oct	go2senkyo.com	Shinzō Abe	50	50	0
14–15 Oct	FNN	Shinzō Abe	42.5	46.3	11.2
14–15 Oct	JNN	Shinzō Abe	48.7	49.2	2.0
13–15 Oct	NHK	Shinzō Abe	39	42	
10–11 Oct	The Nikkei	Shinzō Abe	37	48	
10–11 Oct	Asahi Shimbun	Shinzō Abe	43	41	
7–9 Oct	NHK	Shinzō Abe	37	43	
6–9 Oct	Jiji Press	Shinzō Abe	37.1	41.8	
8 Oct	go2senkyo.com	Shinzō Abe	45	54	1
7-8 Oct	Yomiuri Shimbun	Shinzō Abe	41	46	13
3-4 Oct	Asahi Shimbun	Shinzō Abe	40	38	22
1 Oct	go2senkyo.com	Shinzō Abe	47	52	1
30 Sep - 1 Oct	ANN	Shinzō Abe	36.9	46.3	16.8
30 Sep - 1 Oct	Kyodo News	Shinzō Abe	40.6	46.2	
29 Sep - 1 Oct	Seijiyama	Shinzō Abe	35.7	47.7	16.6
29 Sep - 1 Oct	NHK	Shinzō Abe	37	44	
28-29 Sep	Yomiuri Shimbun	Shinzō Abe	43	46	11
26-27 Sep	Asahi Shimbun	Shinzō Abe	36	39	25
26-27 Sep	Mainichi Shimbun	Shinzō Abe	36	42	19
23-24 Sep	Kyodo News	Shinzō Abe	45.0	41.3	
22-24 Sep	Nikkei & TV Tokyo	Shinzō Abe	50	42	8
16-17 Sep	ANN	Shinzō Abe	41.3	39.6	19.1
16-17 Sep	FNN	Shinzō Abe	50.3	40.0	
8-11 Sep	Jiji News	Shinzō Abe	41.8	36.7	
9-10 Sep	Asahi Shimbun	Shinzō Abe	38	38	
8-10 Sep	NHK	Shinzō Abe	44	36	
8-10 Sep	Yomiuri Shimbun	Shinzō Abe	50	39	
8-10 Sep	NTV	Shinzō Abe	42.1	41.0	17.0
2-3 Sep	JNN	Shinzō Abe	48.1	50.5	1.5
2-3 Sep	Mainichi Shimbun	Shinzō Abe	39	36	22
2-3 Sep	Kyodo News	Shinzō Abe	44.5	46.1	
25-27 Aug	The Nikkei & TV Tokyo	Shinzō Abe	46	46	
19-20 Aug	FNN	Shinzō Abe	43.8	49.0	7.2
5-6 Aug	ANN	Shinzō Abe	37.6	47.2	15.2
5-6 Aug	JNN	Shinzō Abe	39.7	59.0	1.3
5-6 Aug	Asahi Shimbun	Shinzō Abe	35	45	
4-6 Aug	NHK	Shinzō Abe	39	43	
4-6 Aug	NTV	Shinzō Abe	35.6	47.3	17.1
3-6 Aug	Jiji Press	Shinzō Abe	36.6	44.1	
3-4 Aug	Kyodo News	Shinzō Abe	44.4	43.2	
3-4 Aug	Yomiuri Shimbun	Shinzō Abe	42	48	
3-4 Aug	The Nikkei & TV Tokyo	Shinzō Abe	42	49	
3-4 Aug	Mainichi Shimbun	Shinzō Abe	35	47	17
22-23 Jul	FNN	Shinzō Abe	34.7	56.1	9.2
22-23 Jul	The Nikkei & TV Tokyo	Shinzō Abe	39	52	
22-23 Jul	Mainichi Shimbun	Shinzō Abe	26	56	17
15-16 Jul	ANN	Shinzō Abe	29.2	54.5	16.3
15-16 Jul	Kyodo News	Shinzō Abe	35.8	53.1	
7-10 Jul	Jiji Press	Shinzō Abe	29.9	48.6	
8-9 Jul	Asahi Shimbun	Shinzō Abe	33	47	20
7-9 Jul	NTV	Shinzō Abe	31.9	49.2	18.9
7-9 Jul	Yomiuri Shimbun	Shinzō Abe	36	52	11
7-9 Jul	NHK	Shinzō Abe	35	48	17
1-2 Jul	JNN	Shinzō Abe	43.3	55.5	1.3
17-18 Jun	Mainichi Shimbun	Shinzō Abe	36	44	17
17-18 Jun	ANN	Shinzō Abe	37.9	41.6	20.5
17-18 Jun	Asahi Shimbun	Shinzō Abe	41	37	20
17-18 Jun	Kyodo News	Shinzō Abe	44.9	43.1	
17-18 Jun	FNN	Shinzō Abe	47.6	42.9	9.5
17-18 Jun	Yomiuri Shimbun	Shinzō Abe	49	41	10
16-18 Jun	The Nikkei	Shinzō Abe	49	42	
16-18 Jun	NTV	Shinzō Abe	39.8	41.8	18.4
9-11 Jun	NHK	Shinzō Abe	48	36	16
3-4 Jun	JNN	Shinzō Abe	54.4	44.1	1.5
25–28 May	The Nikkei	Shinzō Abe	56	36	
20–21 May	Mainichi Shimbun	Shinzō Abe	46	35	16
20–21 May	ANN	Shinzō Abe	46.4	32.4	21.2
19–21 May	NTV	Shinzō Abe	46.1	36.4	17.6
13–14 May	FNN	Shinzō Abe	56.1	34.7	9.2
12–14 May	Yomiuri Shimbun	Shinzō Abe	61	28	11
12–14 May	NHK	Shinzō Abe	51	30	19
29-30 Apr	JNN	Shinzō Abe	63.3	34.8	1.9
27-30 Apr	The Nikkei	Shinzō Abe	60	32	
22-23 Apr	Mainichi Shimbun	Shinzō Abe	51	30	17
22-23 Apr	ANN	Shinzō Abe	50.4	33.0	16.6
15-16 Apr	FNN	Shinzō Abe	59.3	30.4	10.3
14-16 Apr	NTV	Shinzō Abe	50.4	30.8	18.8
14-16 Apr	Yomiuri Shimbun	Shinzō Abe	60	29	11
7-9 Apr	NHK	Shinzō Abe	53	27	20
1-2 Apr	JNN	Shinzō Abe	57.0	40.6	2.4
25-26 Mar	ANN	Shinzō Abe	50.5	31.2	18.3
24-26 Mar	The Nikkei	Shinzō Abe	62	30	
18-19 Mar	FNN	Shinzō Abe	57.4	30.9	11.7
18-19 Mar	Yomiuri Shimbun	Shinzō Abe	56	33	12
17-19 Mar	NTV	Shinzō Abe	47.6	32.9	19.5
10-12 Mar	NHK	Shinzō Abe	51	31	18
4-5 Mar	JNN	Shinzō Abe	61.0	37.3	1.7
25-26 Feb	ANN	Shinzō Abe	54.5	27.9	17.6
24-26 Feb	The Nikkei	Shinzō Abe	60	30	
18-19 Feb	FNN	Shinzō Abe	58.8	30.1	11.1
17-19 Feb	NTV	Shinzō Abe	54.9	26.0	19.1
17-19 Feb	Yomiuri Shimbun	Shinzō Abe	66	24	9
11-12 Feb	NHK	Shinzō Abe	58	23	19
4-5 Feb	JNN	Shinzō Abe	65.4	33.4	1.2
28-29 Jan	FNN	Shinzō Abe	60.7	30.7	8.6
28-29 Jan	ANN	Shinzō Abe	55.3	27.5	17.2
27-29 Jan	The Nikkei	Shinzō Abe	66	26	
27-29 Jan	Yomiuri Shimbun	Shinzō Abe	61	31	8
20-22 Jan	NTV	Shinzō Abe	57.2	28.9	13.9
14-15 Jan	JNN	Shinzō Abe	67.0	31.5	1.7
7-9 Jan	NHK	Shinzō Abe	55	29	16
2017
17-18 Dec	FNN	Shinzō Abe	55.6	30.9	13.5
12-13 Nov	FNN	Shinzō Abe	57.9	31.9	10.2
15-16 Oct	FNN	Shinzō Abe	57.6	35.5	6.9
17-18 Sep	FNN	Shinzō Abe	56.6	33.3	10.1
9-11 Sep	Yomiuri Shimbun	Shinzō Abe	62	29	9
9-11 Sep	NHK	Shinzō Abe	57	26	17
6-7 Aug	FNN	Shinzō Abe	55.4	33.1	11.5
16-17 Jul	FNN	Shinzō Abe	49.8	39.1	11.1
18-19 Jun	FNN	Shinzō Abe	49.4	38.1	10.6
4-6 Mar	Yomiuri Shimbun	Shinzō Abe	49	40	11
12-14 Feb	Yomiuri Shimbun	Shinzō Abe	52	36	12
5-7 Feb	NHK	Shinzō Abe	50	34	16
30-31 Jan	Yomiuri Shimbun	Shinzō Abe	56	34	9
9-11 Jan	NHK	Shinzō Abe	46	35	19
8-10 Jan	Yomiuri Shimbun	Shinzō Abe	54	36	9
2016
17-18 Dec	Yomiuri Shimbun	Shinzō Abe	49	39	12
11-13 Dec	NHK	Shinzō Abe	46	36	18
4-6 Dec	Yomiuri Shimbun	Shinzō Abe	48	40	12
6-8 Nov	Yomiuri Shimbun	Shinzō Abe	51	38	11
6-8 Nov	NHK	Shinzō Abe	47	39	14
10-12 Oct	NHK	Shinzō Abe	43	40	17
7-8 Oct	Yomiuri Shimbun	Shinzō Abe	46	45	8
19-20 Sep	Yomiuri Shimbun	Shinzō Abe	41	51	8
11–13 Sep	NHK	Shinzō Abe	43	39	18
15-16 Aug	Yomiuri Shimbun	Shinzō Abe	45	45	10
7–9 Aug	NHK	Shinzō Abe	37	46	17
24-26 Jul	Yomiuri Shimbun	Shinzō Abe	43	49	8
18–19 Jul	Asahi Shimbun	Shinzō Abe	37	46	17
11–12 Jun	Asahi Shimbun	Shinzō Abe	39	42	19
10–12 Jul	NHK	Shinzō Abe	41	43	16
3-5 Jul	Yomiuri Shimbun	Shinzō Abe	49	40	10
20–21 Jun	Asahi Shimbun	Shinzō Abe	39	37	24
5-7 Jun	Yomiuri Shimbun	Shinzō Abe	53	36	10
5–7 Jun	NHK	Shinzō Abe	48	34	18
16–17 May	Asahi Shimbun	Shinzō Abe	45	32	23
8–10 May	Yomiuri Shimbun	Shinzō Abe	58	32	10
8–10 May	NHK	Shinzō Abe	51	32	17
18–19 Apr	Asahi Shimbun	Shinzō Abe	44	35	21
10–12 Apr	NHK	Shinzō Abe	51	34	15
3-5 Apr	Yomiuri Shimbun	Shinzō Abe	57	35	8
14–15 Mar	Asahi Shimbun	Shinzō Abe	46	33	21
6–8 Mar	NHK	Shinzō Abe	46	37	17
28 Jan-28 Feb	Yomiuri Shimbun	Shinzō Abe	56	36	8
14–15 Feb	Asahi Shimbun	Shinzō Abe	50	31	19
6–8 Feb	NHK	Shinzō Abe	54	29	17
6-7 Feb	Yomiuri Shimbun	Shinzō Abe	58	34	8
17–18 Jan	Asahi Shimbun	Shinzō Abe	42	37	21
10–12 Jan	NHK	Shinzō Abe	50	32	18
9-11 Jan	Yomiuri Shimbun	Shinzō Abe	53	38	9
2015
24-25 Dec	Yomiuri Shimbun	Shinzō Abe	49	41	10
15–16 Dec	Asahi Shimbun	Shinzō Abe	43	34	23
5–7 Dec	NHK	Shinzō Abe	47	38	15
2014

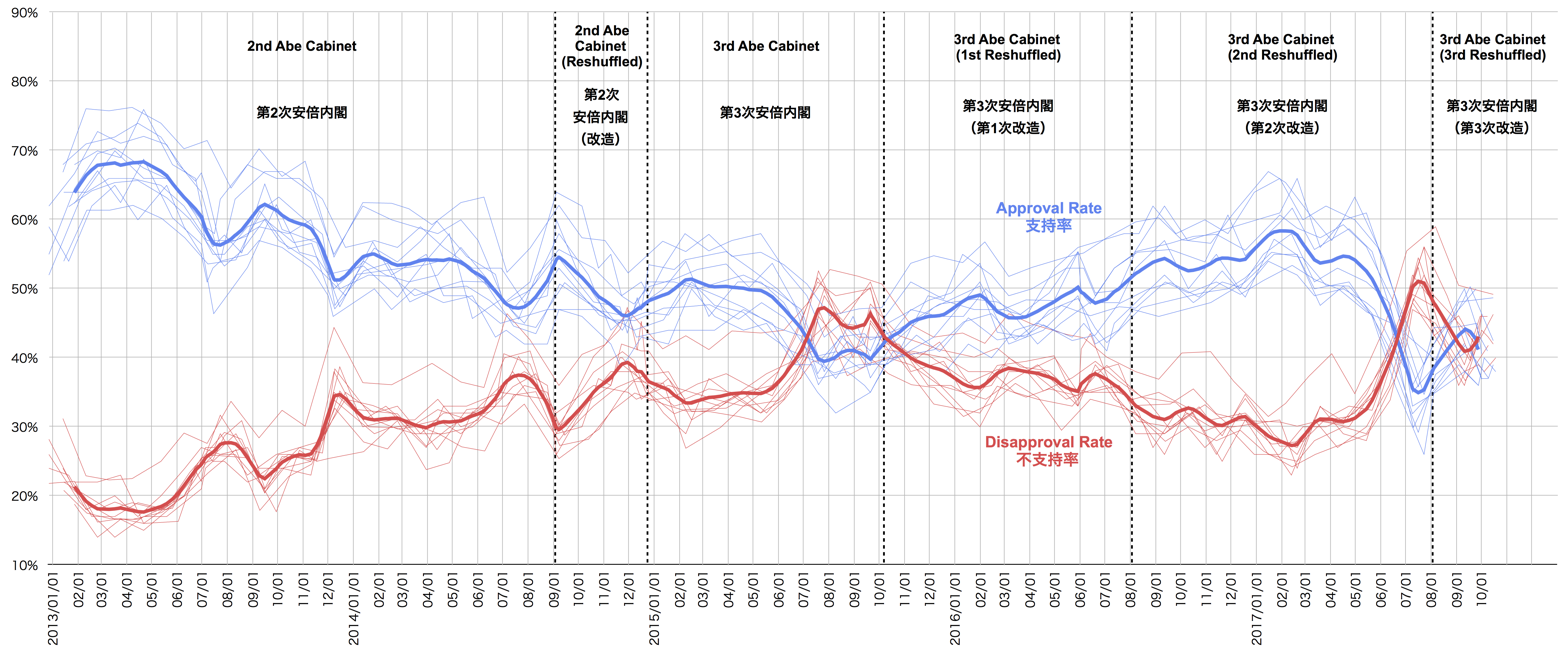
Approval (blue) and Disapproval (red) Ratings for Second and Third Abe Cabinet

== Results ==
Constituency Cartogram

Party	Proportional			Constituency			Total seats	+/–
Party	Votes	%	Seats	Votes	%	Seats	Total seats	+/–
Liberal Democratic Party	18,555,717	33.28	66	26,500,777	47.82	218	284	−7
Constitutional Democratic Party of Japan	11,084,890	19.88	37	4,726,326	8.53	18	55	New
Kibō no Tō	9,677,524	17.36	32	11,437,602	20.64	18	50	New
Komeito	6,977,712	12.51	21	832,453	1.50	8	29	−6
Japanese Communist Party	4,404,081	7.90	11	4,998,932	9.02	1	12	−9
Nippon Ishin no Kai	3,387,097	6.07	8	1,765,053	3.18	3	11	New
Social Democratic Party	941,324	1.69	1	634,770	1.15	1	2	0
Happiness Realization Party	292,084	0.52	0	159,171	0.29	0	0	0
New Party Daichi	226,552	0.41	0				0	New
Shiji Seitō Nashi	125,019	0.22	0				0	0
Party for Japanese Kokoro	85,552	0.15	0				0	−2
Assembly for Zero Parliamentary Compensation				21,892	0.04	0	0	New
New Party Constitution Article 9				6,655	0.01	0	0	New
Fair Party				5,518	0.01	0	0	New
Japan New Party				5,291	0.01	0	0	New
Assembly to Make Nagano Prefecture the Best Economy in Japan				3,784	0.01	0	0	New
Workers Party Aiming for Liberation of Labor				3,133	0.01	0	0	New
Association to Innovate Metropolitan Government				2,931	0.01	0	0	New
Katsuko Inumaru and Republican Party				1,570	0.00	0	0	0
World Economic Community Party				1,307	0.00	0	0	0
Independents				4,315,028	7.79	22	22	+14
Total	55,757,552	100.00	176	55,422,193	100.00	289	465	−10
Valid votes	55,757,552	97.91		55,422,088	97.32			
Invalid/blank votes	1,187,702	2.09		1,528,869	2.68			
Total votes	56,945,254	100.00		56,950,957	100.00			
Registered voters/turnout	106,091,229	53.68		106,091,229	53.68			
Source: Ministry of Internal Affairs and Communications

=== By prefecture ===
Prefecture	Total seats	Seats won							
Prefecture	Total seats	LDP	CDP	Kibō	Komei	Ishin	JCP	SDP	Ind.
Aichi	15	8	2	3					2
Akita	3	3							
Aomori	3	3							
Chiba	13	12							1
Ehime	4	3		1					
Fukui	2	2							
Fukuoka	11	11							
Fukushima	5	3							2
Gifu	5	5							
Gunma	5	5							
Hiroshima	7	6		1					
Hokkaido	12	6	5		1				
Hyōgo	12	10			2				
Ibaraki	7	6							1
Ishikawa	3	3							
Iwate	3	1		1					1
Kagawa	3	2		1					
Kagoshima	4	3	1						
Kanagawa	18	13	3	1					1
Kōchi	2	1							1
Kumamoto	4	4							
Kyoto	6	4		1					1
Mie	4	2							2
Miyagi	6	5							1
Miyazaki	3	3							
Nagano	5	2		2					1
Nagasaki	4	3		1					
Nara	3	3							
Niigata	6	2	1						3
Ōita	3	3							
Okayama	5	5							
Okinawa	4	1					1	1	1
Osaka	19	10	1		4	3			1
Saga	2			1					1
Saitama	15	13	1	1					
Shiga	4	4							
Shimane	2	2							
Shizuoka	8	6		2					
Tochigi	5	4							1
Tokushima	2	2							
Tokyo	25	19	4	1	1				
Tottori	2	2							
Toyama	3	3							
Wakayama	3	2		1					
Yamagata	3	3							
Yamaguchi	4	4							
Yamanashi	2	1							1
Total	289	218	18	18	8	3	1	1	22

=== By PR block ===
PR block	Total seats	Seats won						
PR block	Total seats	LDP	CDP	Kibō	Komei	JCP	Ishin	SDP
Chūgoku	11	5	2	2	2			
Hokkaido	8	3	3	1	1			
Hokuriku–Shinetsu	11	5	2	2	1	1		
Kinki (Kansai)	28	9	5	3	4	2	5	
Kyushu	20	7	3	4	3	1	1	1
Northern Kanto	19	7	5	4	2	1		
Shikoku	6	3	1	1	1			
Southern Kanto	22	8	5	4	2	2	1	
Tohoku	13	5	3	3	1	1		
Tōkai	21	8	4	5	2	1	1	
Tokyo	17	6	4	3	2	2		
Total	176	66	37	32	21	11	8	1

=== Notable defeats ===
Party	Name	Constituency	Year elected	Defeated by	Party	Details
LDP	Yūji Yamamoto	Kochi-2nd	1990 (in Kochi-3rd)	Hajime Hirota	Independent	Agriculture Minister in the Third Abe Cabinet. He was returned to the Diet through the Shikoku PR block.
LDP	Koya Nishikawa	Tochigi-2nd (Kita-Kantō PR block)	1996	Akio Fukuda	Independent	Agriculture Minister in the Second Abe Cabinet who was defeated in the district in 2014 but managed to return through the PR block at that time. He didn't enter the block this time round and therefore was not returned to the Diet.
LDP	Yūko Nakagawa	Hokkaido-11th	2012	Kaori Ishikawa	CDP	MP since 2012 and widow of former finance minister, Shōichi Nakagawa.
LDP	Miki Yamada	Tokyo-1st	2012	Banri Kaieda	CDP	Vice Minister of Foreign Affairs in the Third Abe Cabinet. Yamada famously defeated former DPJ leader Kaieda in the 2014 election. Kaieda regained his seat in this election. Yamada was able to retain her Diet seat through the LDP list for the Tokyo PR block.
LDP	Takao Ochi	Tokyo-6th	2012	Takayuki Ochiai	CDP	Vice Minister of the Cabinet Office in the Second and Third Abe Cabinet. Ochi was able to hold on to his Diet seat through the LDP list for the Tokyo PR block.
LDP	Masatada Tsuchiya	Tokyo-18th	2012	Naoto Kan	CDP	Former mayor of Musashino. Tsuchiya defeated former PM Kan in the 2014 election. Kan was able to return to the parliament through the Tokyo PR block and was the very last (475th) MP elected that night. He regained his seat in the election. Conversely, Tsuchiya wasn't returned to the Diet as he was not in the LDP list for the Tokyo PR block.
Komeito	Isamu Ueda	Kanagawa-6th	2000 (block); 2003 (district)	Yōichirō Aoyagi	CDP	Deputy Secretary General of the Komeito party and Vice Finance Minister in the Second and Third Koizumi Cabinet
Kibō no Tō	Masaru Wakasa	Tokyo-10th	2014 (block); 2016 (district)	Hayato Suzuki	LDP	A founding member of Kibō no Tō and one of the closest allies of Yuriko Koike. He was in the Kibō list for the Tokyo PR block, but was not able to hold on to his Diet seat due to receiving inadequate votes.
Kibō no Tō	Sumio Mabuchi	Nara-1st	2003	Shigeki Kobayashi	LDP	Minister of Land, Infrastructure, Transport and Tourism in the Kan cabinet and a candidate for the 2012 DPJ leadership election. Mabuchi has the highest ratio of margin of defeat (97.27%) among all defeated candidates in the election.
Independent (formerly LDP)	Keiichirō Asao	Kanagawa-4th	2009	Yuki Waseda	CDP	Former chairman of the defunct Your Party. He contested as an independent as he wasn't selected by the LDP in the snap election.
Independent (formerly LDP)	Mayuko Toyota	Saitama-4th	2012	Yasushi Hosaka	LDP	Toyota resigned from the LDP due to a high-profile bullying scandal in June 2017. At the time of the election, she was under investigation for assaulting her former aide. She contested as an independent as she wasn't selected by the LDP in the snap election.

== Aftermath ==
Results of the Prime Minister election
Party	Candidate	Votes	
Party	Candidate	Rep	Cou
LDP–Kōmei	Shinzō Abe	312	151
CDP	Yukio Edano	60	9
Kibō	Shū Watanabe	51	3
DP	Kōhei Ōtsuka	16	48
JCP	Kazuo Shii	12	14
Ishin	Toranosuke Katayama	11	11
Former DP	Seiji Maehara	1	0
Independent	Eiichirō Washio	1	0
Independent	Kenzō Fujisue	0	2
Invalid/blank vote		1	1
Did not vote		0	3
Total		465	242

=== Reactions and analysis ===
The success of the CDP in surpassing the Kibō no Tō in the number of seats and becoming the official opposition party was surprising. It presented a potential challenge for the ruling coalition to pass the constitutional amendment of Article 9, which was one of the main issues of the 2017 general election that was supported by Kibō no Tō leader Koike but opposed by the pacifist coalition. With a supermajority in both the upper and the lower house, the ruling coalition was expected to pass other legislation without much resistance. In a post-election conference, Prime Minister Shinzō Abe was optimistic about moving forward, stating that the victory was the first time the LDP have "won three consecutive victories" under the same party leader. The landslide victory achieved by the LDP campaign has been observed as not completely related to the popularity of Shinzo Abe, as the victory was also significantly influenced by the disconnect between the oppositions, notably the failure of Koike and the pacifist coalition to unite over many election issues.

Nevertheless, the CDP finishing second led to Kibō no Tō dissolving in 2018 (with Shigefumi Matsuzawa reviving the party in a smaller capacity) and merging into the Democratic Party For the People, which subsequently largely merged into a refounded CDP, with the exception of a splinter group led by Yuichiro Tamaki. Koike became an independent, lightly cooperating with the LDP and her own regional party, Tomin First no Kai.

=== Investiture vote ===
A special Diet session was convened on 1 November to elect the next prime minister. Abe was re-elected with 312 and 151 votes in the House of Representatives and House of Councillors respectively. The new cabinet was formed later on the day.

== See also ==
- Constitution of Japan
- Elections in Japan
