= Yosuke Suzuki =

Japanese politician

- 鈴木 庸介
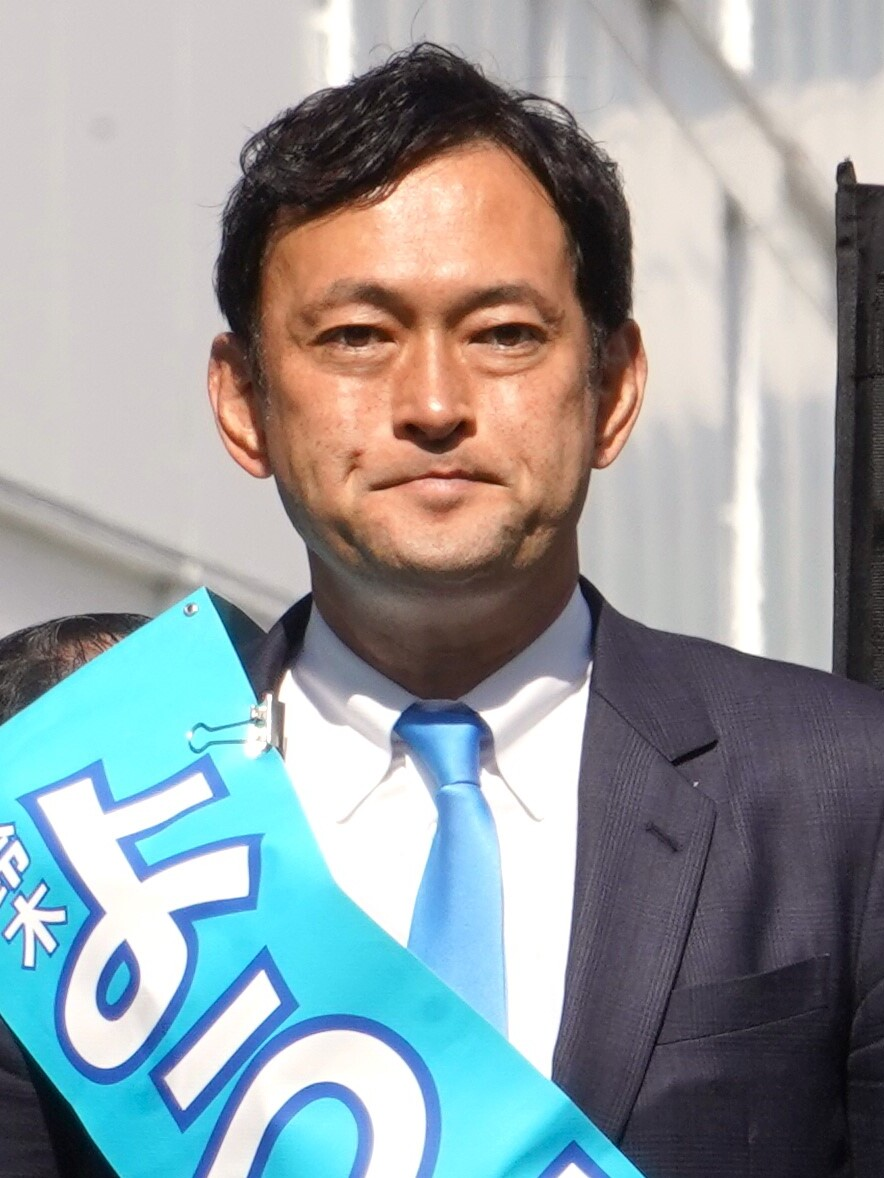
- Suzuki in 2024

Member of the House of Representatives
- In office 5 November 2021 – 23 January 2026
- Constituency: Tokyo PR

Personal details
- Born: 21 November 1975 (age 50) Toshima, Tokyo, Japan
- Party: CRA (since 2026)
- Other political affiliations: DPJ (2015–2016); DP (2016–2017); CDP (2017–2026)
- Education: Rikkyo University; Columbia University; London School of Economics
- Website: yosukesuzuki.net

Yosuke Suzuki (Japanese: 鈴木 庸介, born 21 November 1975) is a Japanese politician who served in the House of Representatives as a member of the Constitutional Democratic Party from 2021 to 2026, representing Tokyo proportional representation block. He was elected for the first time in 2021.

== Early life and education ==
Suzuki was born in Kitaotsuka, in the Toshima ward of Tokyo. He graduated from Nishisugamo Elementary School in Toshima Ward. While he was a student at Rikkyo University's Faculty of Economics, he was the captain of the wrestling club. After graduating from college, he joined NHK as a reporter. Suzuki acquired postgraduate degrees at Columbia University and the London School of Economics.

== Political career ==
Suzuki was appointed as the head of the Democratic Party of Japan's 10th district of Tokyo in December 2015. In October 2016, due to the resignation of Yuriko Koike from the House of Representatives in order to run as the Governor of Tokyo, Suzuki ran for the Democratic Party in the 10th district of Tokyo for the House of Representatives, but was defeated by the Liberal Democratic Party's member Masaru Wakasa.

On 28 September 2017, the Democratic Party decided to join the Party of Hope led by Koike without holding an official candidate for the 48th House of Representatives general election. On 2 October, when Yukio Edano announced his intention to launch a new party, the Constitutional Democratic Party. Suzuki held a press conference with Akihiro Matsuo, Harumi Yoshida and others, who are the heads of the Democratic Party branch and expressed his intention to run for the Constitutional Democratic Party.

In the 49th House of Representatives general election in October 2021, he ran for the Constitutional Democratic Party as candidate from the 10th district of Tokyo and was elected. In the representative election (held on 30 November) following the resignation of Yukio Edano, he was named as a nominee for Junya Ogawa. He represented the National Diet as part of a delegation to an OECD meeting on 17 and 18 March 2022.

On 26 July 2022, the Constitutional Democratic Party warned Suzuki, who entered Ukraine, where an evacuation advisory was issued, in the name of the secretary-general. As a result of his trip to Ukraine, Suzuki was suspended from party positions such as the assistant chairman of the Policy Research Council for one month.

== Political positions ==
Suzuki expressed opposition to amending the constitution and the Legislation for Peace and Security in a 2017 questionnaire conducted by The Asahi Shimbun. He later expressed support for constitutional revision in 2021, while continuing to oppose formal recognition of the Japan Self-Defense Forces under Article 9.

Suzuki supports revision of surname law to allow married women to maintain their birth surnames. He has expressed support for legalisation of same-sex marriage, as well as the LGBT Understanding Promotion Act. Regarding the introduction of the quota system, he answered "yes" in the 2021 questionnaire.

Suzuki has called for Russia to return the Kuril Islands to Japan, and supports the Free Nations of Post-Russia Forum, attending the forum's 2023 meeting in Japan. During the Ukrainian refugee crisis following the 2022 Russian invasion of Ukraine, Japan did not accept Ukrainian refugees due to policies designed to mitigate the COVID-19 pandemic. Suzuki advocated for their permission to enter Japan during a seating of the legal committee in March 2022. As an outcome, the Minister of Justice agreed to look into this issue. The following day, prime minister Fumio Kishida announced the acceptance of Ukrainian refugees. Suzuki also called for the Japanese government to temporarily reduce the consumption tax, calling such a reduction "necessary".

Suzuki is a supporter of the anti–nuclear power movement, arguing in 2021 that Japan should not depend on nuclear power.

Regarding Abenomics, in the 2017 questionnaire, he answered, "I would rather evaluate it". Regarding the response of the Abe Cabinet to the Moritomo Gakuen and Kake Gakuen scandals, he answered "not evaluated" in the 2017 questionnaire.
