= Kōki Kobayashi =

Japanese politician

- 小林 興起
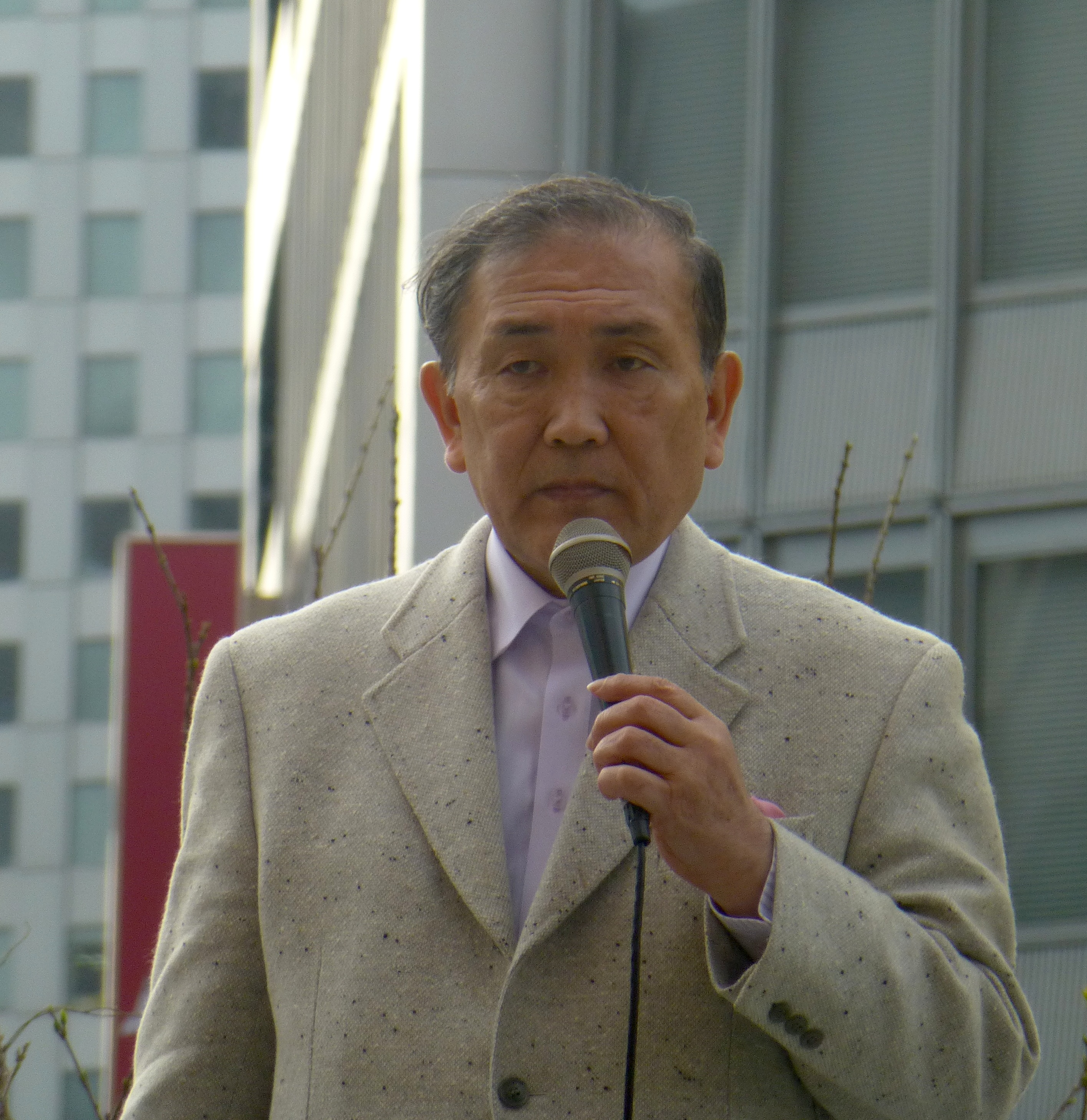
- Kobayashi in 2016

Leader of the Tsubasa Party
- In office 20 May 2019 – 2 July 2019
- Preceded by: Position established
- Succeeded by: Atsuhiko Kurokawa

Member of the House of Representatives
- In office 30 August 2009 – 16 November 2012
- Constituency: Tokyo PR
- In office 20 October 1996 – 8 August 2005
- Preceded by: Constituency established
- Succeeded by: Yuriko Koike
- Constituency: Tokyo 10th
- In office 18 February 1990 – 18 June 1993
- Preceded by: Yasushi Nakamura
- Succeeded by: Kōichi Yoshida
- Constituency: Tokyo 5th

Personal details
- Born: 1 January 1944 (age 82) Nerima, Tokyo, Japan
- Party: Tsubasa
- Other political affiliations: LDP (1990–2005); NPN (2005–2006); PNP (2006–2008); Independent (2008–2009); DPJ (2009–2012); Genzei Nippon (2012); Tax Cuts Japan (2012); TPJ (2012)
- Education: University of Tokyo; University of Pennsylvania
- Website: kobachan.jp

Kōki Kobayashi (小林 興起, Kobayashi Kōki) is a Japanese politician. He was a Member of the House of Representatives for Tokyo's 10th district from 1996 to 2005.

== Political career ==
Kōki is one of the founding members of New Party Nippon. He lost his seat in the House of Representatives to Yuriko Koike on September 11, 2005 during the 2005 Japanese general election.
