= Tokyo 10th district =

Japan House of Representatives constituency

Tokyo 10th District
- Parliamentary constituency for the Japanese House of Representatives
- Numbered map of inner Tokyo single-member districts
- Prefecture: Tokyo
- Proportional District: Tokyo
- Electorate: 351,821 (2012)

Current constituency
- Created: 1994
- Seats: One
- Party: LDP
- Representative: Hayato Suzuki
- Created from: Tokyo 5th district
- Wards: Toshima and Bunkyō wards

Tokyo 10th district is a constituency of the House of Representatives in the Diet of Japan (national legislature). As of 2012, 351,821 eligible voters were registered in the district. The district is located in the central area of the former city of Tokyo. After redistricting in 2022 it comprises the wards of Toshima and Bunkyō. Previously it had covered Toshima and a part of Nerima ward.

Before the electoral reform of 1994, the area had been part of Tokyo 5th district where three Representatives had been elected by single non-transferable vote. Until her successful gubernatorial bid in 2016, Liberal Democrat Yuriko Koike had represented the district. Koike, formerly a representative for Hyōgo 6th district, had taken over Tokyo 10th district in 2005 as one of Jun'ichirō Koizumi's "female assassins" to take out postal privatization rebel Kōki Kobayashi. In the landslide election of 2009, she lost the district to Takako Ebata (DPJ, Ozawa group), one of the so-called "Ozawa girls" (小沢ガールズ, Ozawa gāruzu), a group of female first-time candidates handpicked by DPJ ex-chairman Ichirō Ozawa.

The current representative, elected in the 2017 general election, is Hayato Suzuki.

== List of representatives ==
Representative	Party	Dates	Notes
Kōki Kobayashi	LDP	1996–2005	Postal privatization rebel in 2005, joined New Party Nippon
Yuriko Koike	LDP	2005–2009	Re-elected in the Tokyo PR block, minister of state in the 2nd and 3rd Koizumi Cabinets and the 1st Abe Cabinet
Takako Ebata	DPJ	2009–2012	Failed re-election in the Tokyo block
Yuriko Koike	LDP	2012–2016	Forfeited seat on July 14, 2016 when she became a candidate in the gubernatorial election
Vacant (July – October 2016)
Masaru Wakasa	LDP	2016–2017	Submitted his resignation from the LDP ahead of the 2017 Tokyo prefectural election to support Koike's new party. The LDP accepted his exit on July 3, 2017.
Masaru Wakasa	Kibō	2017	Submitted his resignation from the LDP ahead of the 2017 Tokyo prefectural election to support Koike's new party. The LDP accepted his exit on July 3, 2017.
Hayato Suzuki	LDP	2017–	

== Election results ==
2026
Party	Candidate	Votes	%	±%
LDP	Hayato Suzuki	126,044	49.1	▲10.4
Centrist Reform	Yōsuke Suzuki	67,575	26.3	▼12.1
DPP	Mizuho Kajiwara	39,555	16.7	
Sanseitō	Shin Yasuda	17,646	6.9	▲0.3
Ichiban Hoshi	Tooru Koyama	2,686	1.0	
Registered electors		417,497		
Turnout			62.91	▲3.26
LDP hold				

2024
Party	Candidate	Votes	%	±%
LDP	Hayato Suzuki (supported by Kōmeitō)	93,490	38.65	▼5.15
CDP	Yōsuke Suzuki (elected in Tokyo PR)	92,899	38.40	▼2.66
Ishin	Hiroko Nagano	39,555	16.35	▲4.72
Sanseitō	Shin Yasuda	15,970	6.60	new
Turnout		241,914	59.65	▲3.15

2021
Party	Candidate	Votes	%	±%
LDP	Hayato Suzuki (supported by Kōmeitō)	115,122	43.80	▲6.43
CDP	Yōsuke Suzuki (elected in Tokyo PR)	107,920	41.06	▲12.29
Ishin	Takashi Fujikawa	30,574	11.63	
Independent	Tōru Koyama	4,684	1.78	▲0.92
New Party for Japanese Kokoro	Yūji Sawaguchi	4,552	1.73	
Turnout			56.50	▲3.55
LDP hold		Swing	▼2.4	

2017
Party	Candidate	Votes	%	±%
LDP	Hayato Suzuki (supported by Kōmeitō)	91,146	37.4	N/A
CDP	Yōsuke Suzuki	70,168	28.8	N/A
Kibō no Tō	Masaru Wakasa	57,901	23.7	−36.6
JCP	Yoshinobu Kishi	20,828	8.5	N/A
Independent	Tōru Koyama	2,107	0.9	N/A
Happiness Realization	Toshimitsu Yoshii	1,744	0.7	−1.5

2016 by-election
Party	Candidate	Votes	%	±%
LDP (K)	Masaru Wakasa	75,755	60.3	new
DP (Seikatsusha Net, SDP)	Yōsuke Suzuki	47,141	37.5	new
HRP	Toshimitsu Yoshii	2,824	2.2	new
Turnout		127,965	37.85	−18.71

2014
Party	Candidate	Votes	%	±%
LDP (K)	Yuriko Koike	93,610	50.7	−3.0
DPJ	Takako Ebata	44,123	23.9	+0.5
JCP	Hideko Kon	28,453	15.4	+4.5
PLP	Ryō Tagaya	9,663	5.2	−6.8
PFG	Chizuko Kamitani	8,688	4.7	new

2012
Party	Candidate	Votes	%	±%
LDP (NK)	Yuriko Koike	108,983	53.7	+10.4
DPJ (PNP)	Takako Ebata	47,493	23.4	−23.8
TPJ (NPD)	Ryō Tagaya	24,414	12.0	+12.0
JCP	Hideko Kon	22,044	10.9	+1.5

2009
Party	Candidate	Votes	%	±%
DPJ (PNP support)	Takako Ebata	105,512	47.2	+24.2
LDP (Kōmeitō support)	Yuriko Koike (elected by PR)	96,739	43.3	−6.8
JCP	Toshie Yamamoto	21,092	9.4	+1.2
Turnout		227,220	65.66	

2005
Party	Candidate	Votes	%	±%
LDP	Yuriko Koike	109,764	50.1	+4.9
Democratic	Muneaki Samejima	50,536	23.0	−19.7
New Party Nippon	Kōki Kobayashi	41,089	18.7	+18.7
JCP	Toshie Yamamoto	17,929	8.2	−2.5
Turnout		222,096	66.55	

2003
Party	Candidate	Votes	%	±%
LDP	Kōki Kobayashi	81,979	45.2	+6.4
Democratic	Muneaki Samejima (elected by PR)	77,417	42.7	+7.8
JCP	Toshie Yamamoto	19,338	10.7	−5.6
Japan Nation Party	Sakae Shirai	2,706	1.4	+1.4
Turnout		187,204	56.27	

2000
Party	Candidate	Votes	%	±%
LDP	Kōki Kobayashi	71,318	38.8	−8.1
Democratic	Muneaki Samejima (elected by PR)	64,272	34.9	+34.9
JCP	Toshie Yamamoto	29,907	16.3	+0.4
LP	Hiromasa Hotta	18,509	10.1	+10.1

1996
Party	Candidate	Votes	%	±%
LDP	Kōki Kobayashi	52,787	30.7	
New Frontier	Muneaki Samejima	45,536	26.4	
Democratic	Akira Nagatsuma	33,480	19.4	
JCP	Ken Nakano	27,230	15.8	
Social Democratic	Hideki Tanaka	8,394	4.9	
Independent	Akito Kamojima	4,745	2.8	
Turnout		176,190	55.59	
