= Takako Ebata =

Japanese politician

- 江端 貴子
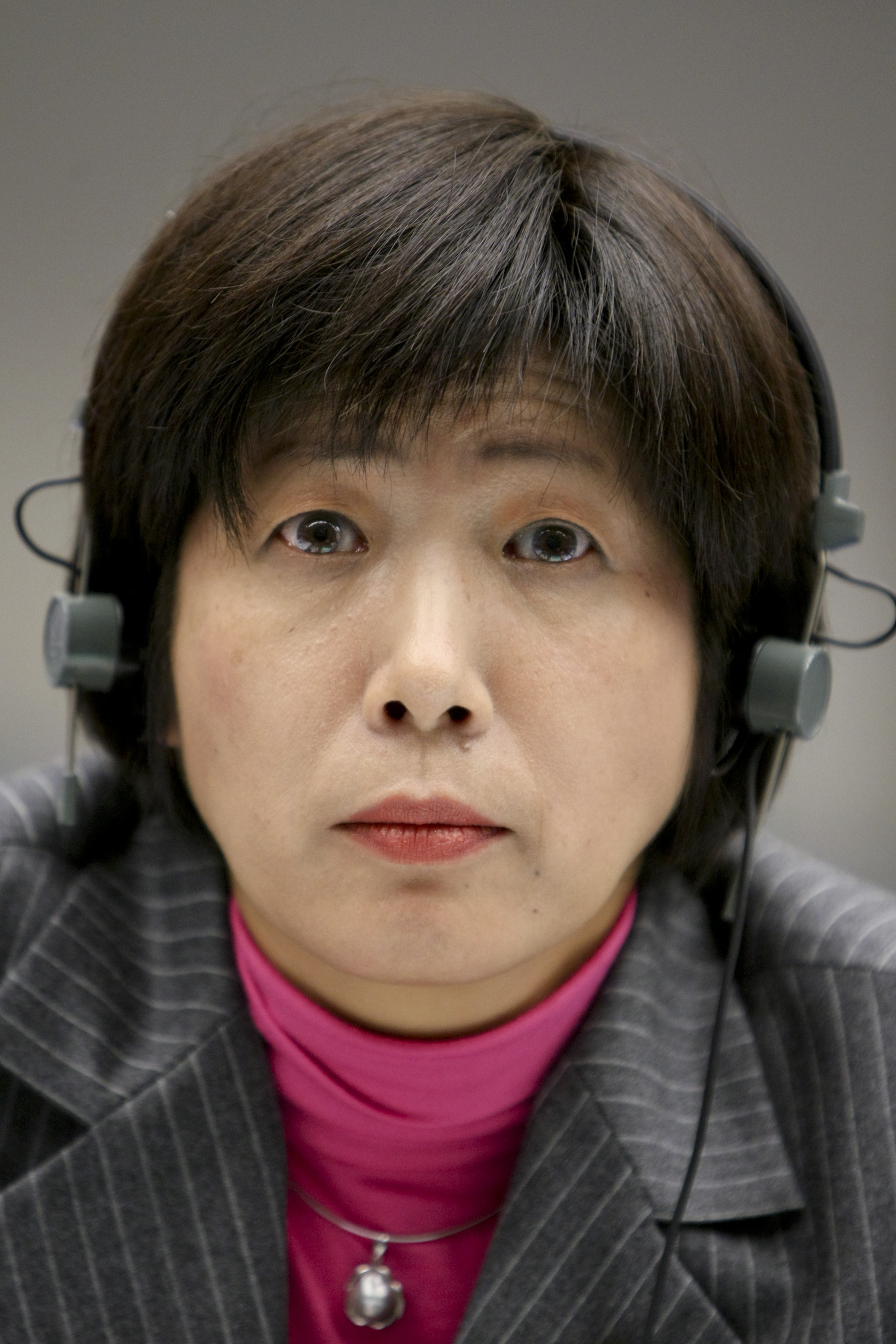
- Ebata in 2011

Member of the House of Representatives
- In office 30 August 2009 – 16 November 2012
- Preceded by: Yuriko Koike
- Succeeded by: Yuriko Koike
- Constituency: Tokyo 10th

Personal details
- Born: 22 December 1959 (age 66) Tokyo, Japan
- Party: Democratic
- Education: Yokohama National University; Massachusetts Institute of Technology

Takako Ebata (江端 貴子, Ebata Takako) is a Japanese politician. She was a Member of the House of Representatives for Tokyo's 10th district from 2009 to 2012.

== Background ==
She has an education degree from Yokohama National University and a Master of Science in Management from the Sloan School of Management at the Massachusetts Institute of Technology.

Takoko was an associate professor at the University of Tokyo before winning a ticket to the House of Representatives in the 2009 Japanese general election.
