= Hayato Suzuki =

Japanese politician

- 鈴木 隼人
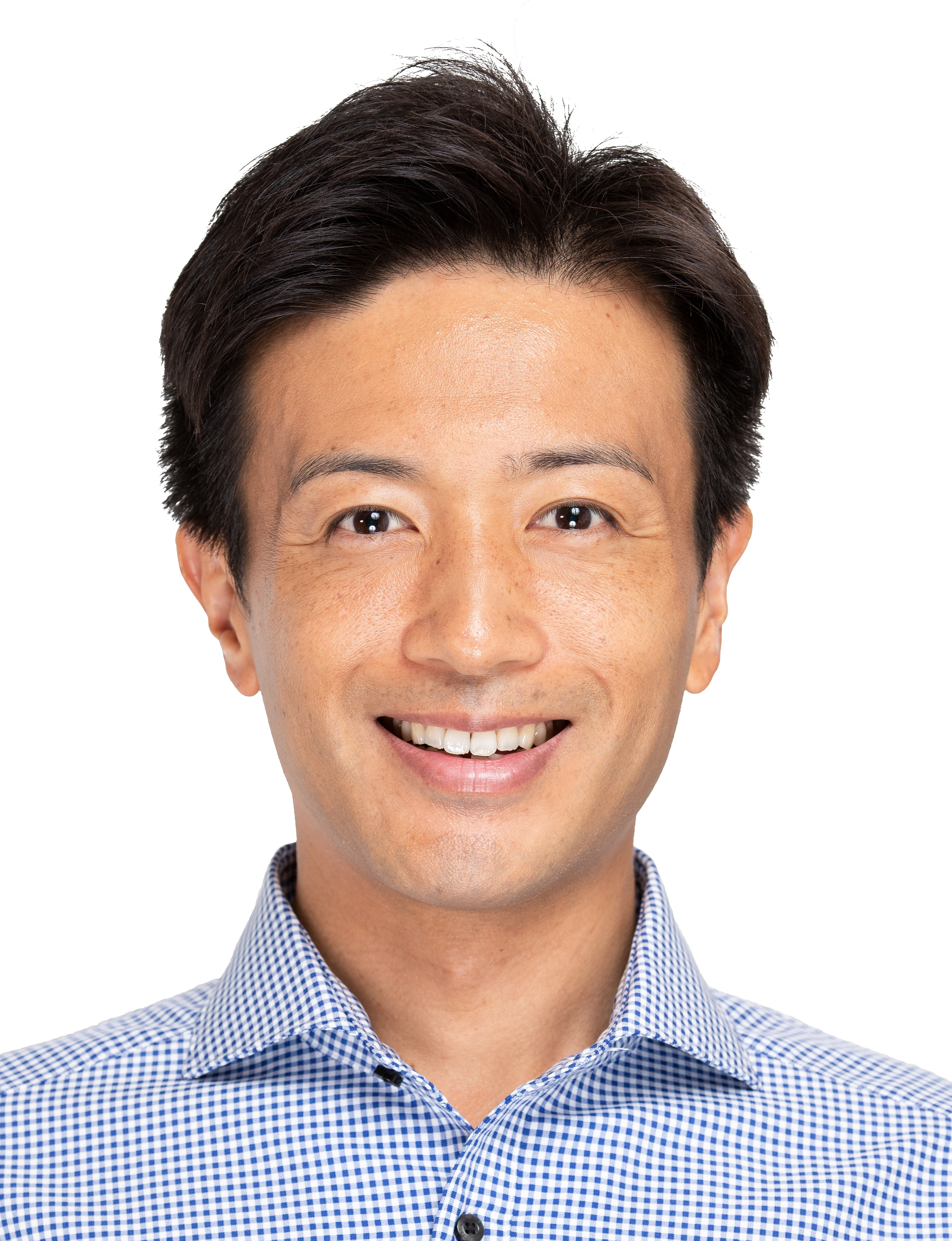
- Official portrait, 2020

Member of the House of Representatives
- Incumbent
- Assumed office 19 December 2014
- Preceded by: Multi-member district
- Constituency: Tokyo PR (2014–2017); Tokyo 10th (2017–present)

Personal details
- Born: 8 August 1977 (age 49) Tokyo, Japan
- Party: Liberal Democratic
- Education: University of Tokyo

Hayato Suzuki (鈴木 隼人, Suzuki Hayato; born 8 August 1977) is a Japanese politician from the Liberal Democratic Party. He has represented Tokyo 10th district in the House of Representatives since 2017.
