= Masaru Wakasa =

Japanese lawyer and politician

- 若狭 勝
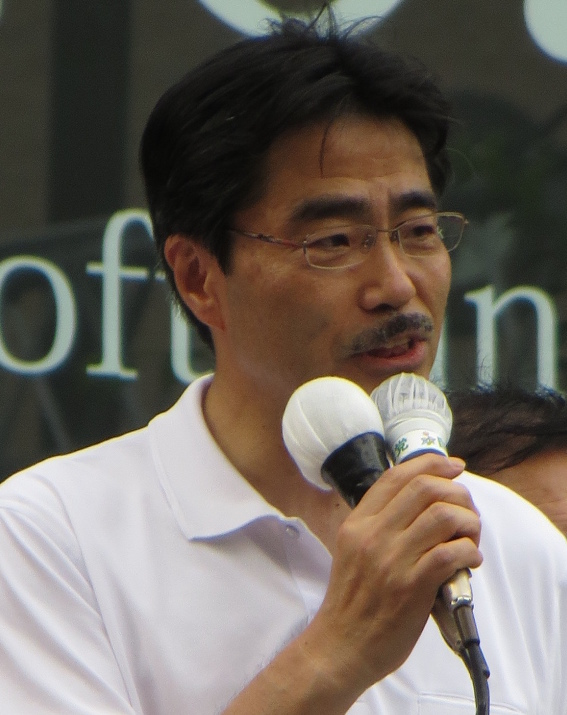
- Wakasa in 2013

Member of the House of Representatives
- In office 26 October 2016 – 28 September 2017
- Preceded by: Yuriko Koike
- Succeeded by: Hayato Suzuki
- Constituency: Tokyo 10th
- In office 19 December 2014 – 11 October 2016
- Preceded by: Multi-member district
- Succeeded by: Tsuyoshi Tabata
- Constituency: Tokyo PR

Personal details
- Born: 6 December 1956 (age 69) Katsushika, Tokyo, Japan
- Party: Kibō no Tō (2017–2018)
- Other political affiliations: LDP (2013–2017); Tomin First no Kai (2017)
- Education: Chuo University (LLB)
- Website: www.wakasamasaru.jp

Masaru Wakasa (若狭 勝, Wakasa Masaru; born 12 December 1956) is a Japanese lawyer, politician and former member of the House of Representatives in Japan.

== Political career ==
Wakasa started his career as a prosecutor for the Special Investigation Department of the Tokyo District Public Prosecutors Office, and wrote a book on lie detection based on his experiences in this role.

He was listed as a proportional representation candidate for the Liberal Democratic Party in the 2014 general election, and won a seat despite being near the bottom of the list.

In 2017, he left the Liberal Democratic Party to form a new political group called "Nippon First", which is affiliated with the Tomin First no Kai. Being an ally of the Tokyo Governor Yuriko Koike, Wakasa along with Goshi Hosono, who recently departed from Democratic Party (DP), worked together to form a new opposition party called Kibō no Tō (Party of Hope) in September 2017. The new party, co-led by Wakasa, effectively became the new main opposition party after Koike did not endorse "roughly half" of the candidates fielded by DP for the upcoming general election of 2017, leading to the decision to disband DP and have former members of DP to join the new party.

Following the new party's defeat in the 2017 election, Wakasa returned to private law practice at the law firm of Wakasa and Takahashi in Tokyo, where he handles corporate, employment and family law issues. He also frequently appears on television as a commentator on legal issues.
