= Yuriko Koike =

Governor of Tokyo since 2016

- 小池 百合子
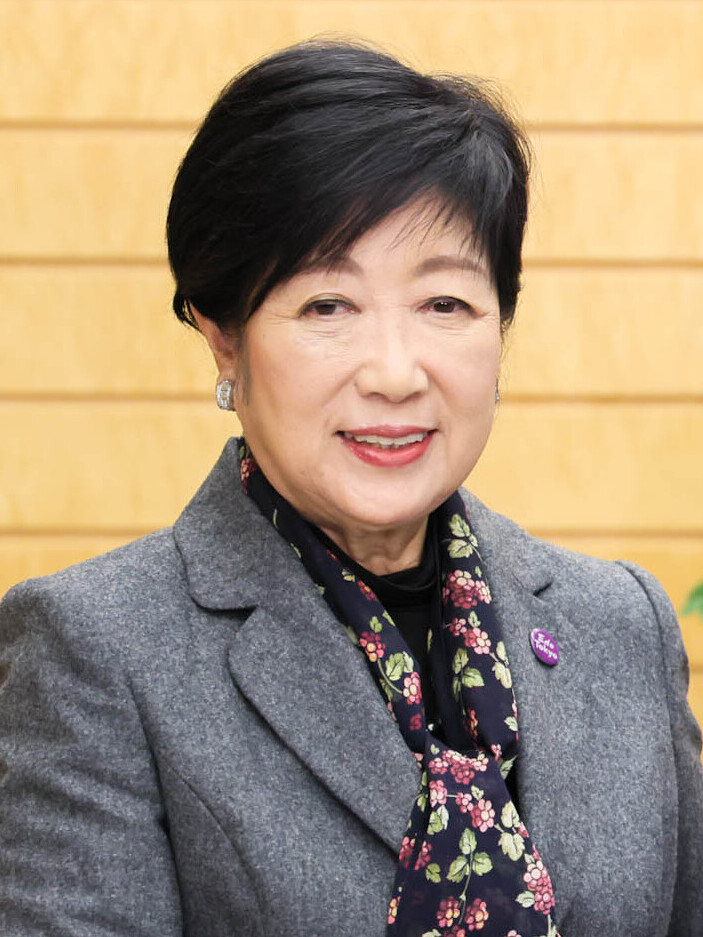
- Koike in 2026

Governor of Tokyo
- Incumbent
- Assumed office 1 August 2016
- Monarchs: Akihito; Naruhito
- Deputy: Mitsuchika Tarao; Hiroshi Kajihara; Kei Takechi; Manabu Miyasaka
- Preceded by: Yōichi Masuzoe
Ministerial offices
Minister of Defense
In office 4 July 2007 – 27 August 2007
Prime Minister	Shinzo Abe
Preceded by	Fumio Kyūma
Succeeded by	Masahiko Kōmura
Minister of State for Okinawa and Northern Territories Affairs
In office 27 September 2004 – 26 September 2006
Prime Minister	Junichiro Koizumi
Preceded by	Toshimitsu Motegi
Succeeded by	Sanae Takaichi
Minister of the Environment
In office 22 September 2003 – 26 September 2006
Prime Minister	Junichiro Koizumi
Preceded by	Shun'ichi Suzuki
Succeeded by	Masatoshi Wakabayashi

Member of the House of Representatives
- In office 19 July 1993 – 14 July 2016
- Preceded by: Yoshitada Konoike
- Succeeded by: Masaru Wakasa
- Constituency: Hyōgo 2nd (1993–1996); Hyōgo 6th (1996–2003); Kinki PR (2003–2005); Tokyo 10th (2005–2009); Tokyo PR (2009–2012); Tokyo 10th (2012–2016)

Member of the House of Councillors
- In office 26 July 1992 – 4 July 1993
- Preceded by: Multi-member district
- Succeeded by: Yoriko Madoka
- Constituency: National PR

Personal details
- Born: 15 July 1952 (age 74) Ashiya, Hyōgo, Japan
- Party: Independent (since 2018)
- Other political affiliations: JNP (1992–1994); NFP (1994–1997); LP (1997–2000); NCP (2000–2003); LDP (2003–2017); TFnK (2017); KnT (2017–2018)
- Education: Kwansei Gakuin University; American University in Cairo; Cairo University
- Website: Official website

Yuriko Koike (Japanese: 小池 百合子, Hepburn: Koike Yuriko; born 15 July 1952) is a Japanese politician who has served as the Governor of Tokyo since 2016. Previously, she also served as a member of the House of Councillors from 1992 to 1993, a member of the House of Representatives from 1993 to 2016, Minister of the Environment under Junichiro Koizumi from 2003 to 2006, and Minister of Defense under Shinzo Abe between July and August 2007.

Born and raised in Ashiya, a wealthy, small, and popular city near Kobe in Hyōgo Prefecture, Koike graduated from Cairo University in Cairo, Egypt in 1976, and served as a member of the House of Representatives of Japan from 1993 until 2016, when she resigned to run for Governor of Tokyo. Previously, she also served as the Minister of the Environment under Junichiro Koizumi's cabinet from 2003 to 2006 and briefly as Minister of Defense under the first cabinet of Shinzo Abe in between July and August 2007.

Koike was elected Governor of Tokyo in 2016, becoming the metropolis' first female governor. Koike was re-elected in 2020 and 2024, winning 59.7% and 42.8% of the popular vote respectively.

Considered one of the most high-profile and well-known Japanese politicians, Koike has been frequently mentioned as holding Prime Ministerial ambitions. She ran in the 2008 Liberal Democratic Party leadership election, becoming the first woman to run for the leadership of a major Japanese political party, however she came in third place losing to Tarō Asō. In 2017, Koike left the LDP amid much media attention and launched two parties: the national party, Kibō no Tō (希望の党/Party of Hope) and the regional party Tomin First no Kai (都民ファーストの会/Tokyoites First Party). Kibō no Tō contested the 2017 general election with Koike as a leader, however the party underperformed expectations and mostly disappeared after merging with the Democratic Party for the People in 2018. The same year, Koike stepped down as leader of Tomin First and officially became independent. However, Koike continues to endorse and campaign for Tomin First candidates in Tokyo and the party still makes frequent use of her image and policies.

Koike has come under some scrutiny from Japanese liberals and Koreans in both Japan and Korea for her refusal to acknowledge the occurrence of 1923 Kantō Massacre, which mainly targeted ethnic Koreans, as well as her association with groups that are often labeled anti-Korean.

== Early life and education ==
Koike was born on 15 July 1952 in Ashiya near Kobe in Hyōgo, Koike went to Kōnan Girls' Junior and Senior High School for her secondary education. Her father, Yūjirō Koike, was a foreign trade merchant who handled oil products. He was also involved in politics, supporting Shintarō Ishihara and the Tatenokai in the 1960s, and ran unsuccessfully for Japanese general election in 1969. Yūjirō emphasised to Yuriko that it was essential for Japan to strengthen relations with Arab countries to ensure a stable petroleum supply to prevent Japan being thrust into an oil war again in the future. After dropping out of Kwansei Gakuin University's School of Sociology in September 1971, she went on to study Arabic at the American University in Cairo and allegedly received a Bachelor of Arts in Sociology as the top student from Cairo University in October 1976. When she was 21, she married a fellow Japanese student but divorced soon after. She began to work as an interpreter of Arabic and later became a journalist, interviewing Muammar Gaddafi and Yasser Arafat in 1978, and becoming a news anchor in 1979. She received the Female Broadcaster of Japan award in 1990.

=== Graduation from Cairo University ===
Koike has been alleged several times of falsifying her credentials, particularly regarding her graduation from Cairo University in Cairo, Egypt. In June 2020, Cairo University released a statement that "Cairo University certifies that Yuriko Koike... graduated from the Department of Sociology, Faculty of Arts, Cairo University in October 1976," denying the allegations.

Meanwhile, Egyptian allegations that she had committed job fraud first surfaced during 1992, they were more widely reported during the Tokyo's gubernatorial election in 2016, and first reported by Japanese news program Tokudane!. Koike sent her graduation certificate to the program in response to allegations. In January 2018, a woman who claimed to have been Koike's roommate at Cairo University wrote to the Japanese monthly magazine Bungei Shunjū after reading an article on Koike. In 2024, the magazine published an article on their website, including a video where Toshiro Kojima, a lawyer and former aide of Koike, said that he helped to falsify Koike's academic credentials including drafting a fake graduation document. Koike has denied the allegations.

== Political career ==
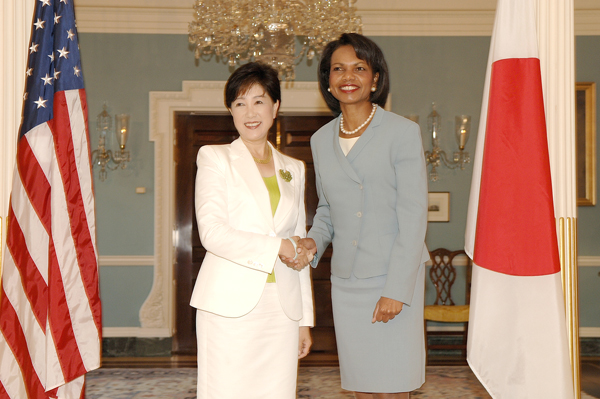
Koike, dubbed "Japan's Condi Rice", shakes hands with Condoleezza Rice in August 2007.

After her graduation in Egypt, Koike was elected to the House of Councillors in 1992 as a member of the Japan New Party. She was then elected to the House of Representatives in 1993, representing the Hyogo 2nd district. In 1996, she was re-elected to the House of Representatives, this time representing the Hyogo 6th district for the New Frontier Party. She held this seat in the 2000 election as a candidate of the New Conservative Party. She joined the Liberal Democratic Party in 2002. She also has been a regular contributor to Project Syndicate since 2010.

=== Cabinet service (2003–2007) ===
She served as the Minister of the Environment and Minister of State for Okinawa and Northern Territories Affairs in the Cabinet of Prime Minister Jun'ichirō Koizumi. Along with Satsuki Katayama and Makiko Fujino, Koike became known as one of Koizumi's "assassins" in the 2005 Lower House election, running in Tokyo against an LDP hardliner candidate who opposed Koizumi's policies.

She was appointed the first female Minister of Defense in June 2007 during the first term of Prime Minister Shinzo Abe, but announced in August 2007 that she intended to resign from the post, citing the Aegis classified information leak scandal as a reason. Koike later hinted that the much-publicized fight she had had with Chief Cabinet Secretary Yasuhisa Shiozaki over a vice-minister replacement was the real reason, as the opposition would use that to oppose a bill on Japan's terrorism laws.

=== 2008 LDP leadership election ===
On 8 September 2008, she launched her bid to become president of the LDP and became the first woman ever to seek the premiership in Japan's history: "I have received the enthusiastic support of my colleagues. In order to break through the deadlock facing Japanese society, I believe the country might as well have a female candidate. Hillary used the word 'glass ceiling' ... but in Japan, it isn't glass, it's an iron plate. I'm not Mrs. Thatcher, but what is needed is a strategy that advances a cause with conviction, clear policies and sympathy with the people." In the leadership election, held on 22 September, Tarō Asō won with 351 of the 527 votes; Koike placed third with 46 votes.

== Governor of Tokyo (2016–present) ==
Following the resignation of Tokyo Governor Naoki Inose in December 2013, Koike was widely rumored to be a potential candidate for the gubernatorial election expected to be held in February 2014, along with Hideo Higashikokubaru, Hakubun Shimomura, Seiko Hashimoto and Yōichi Masuzoe. She ultimately did not run, and Masuzoe won.

Governor Koike speaking in 2017

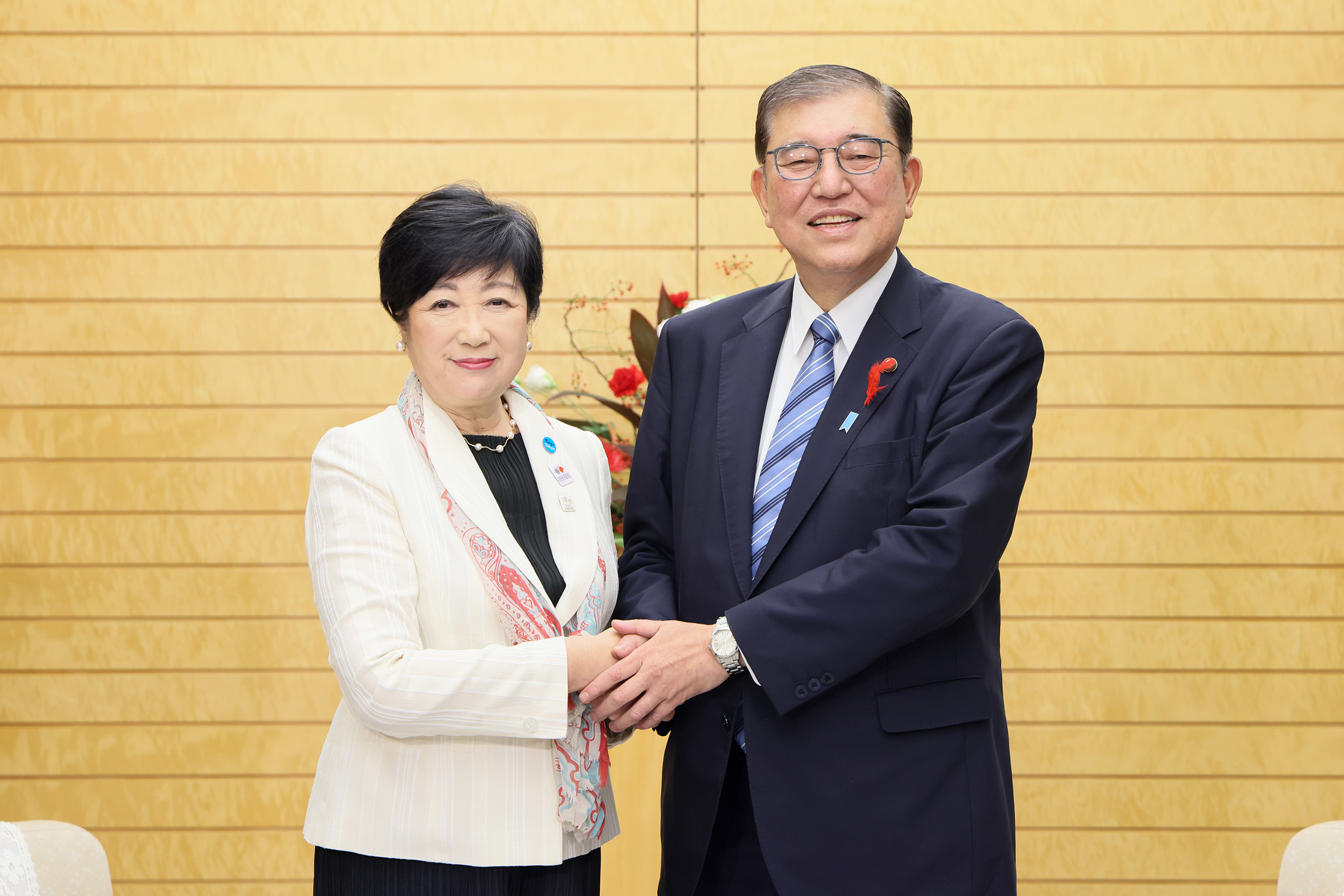
Governor Koike with Prime Minister Shigeru Ishiba in 2024

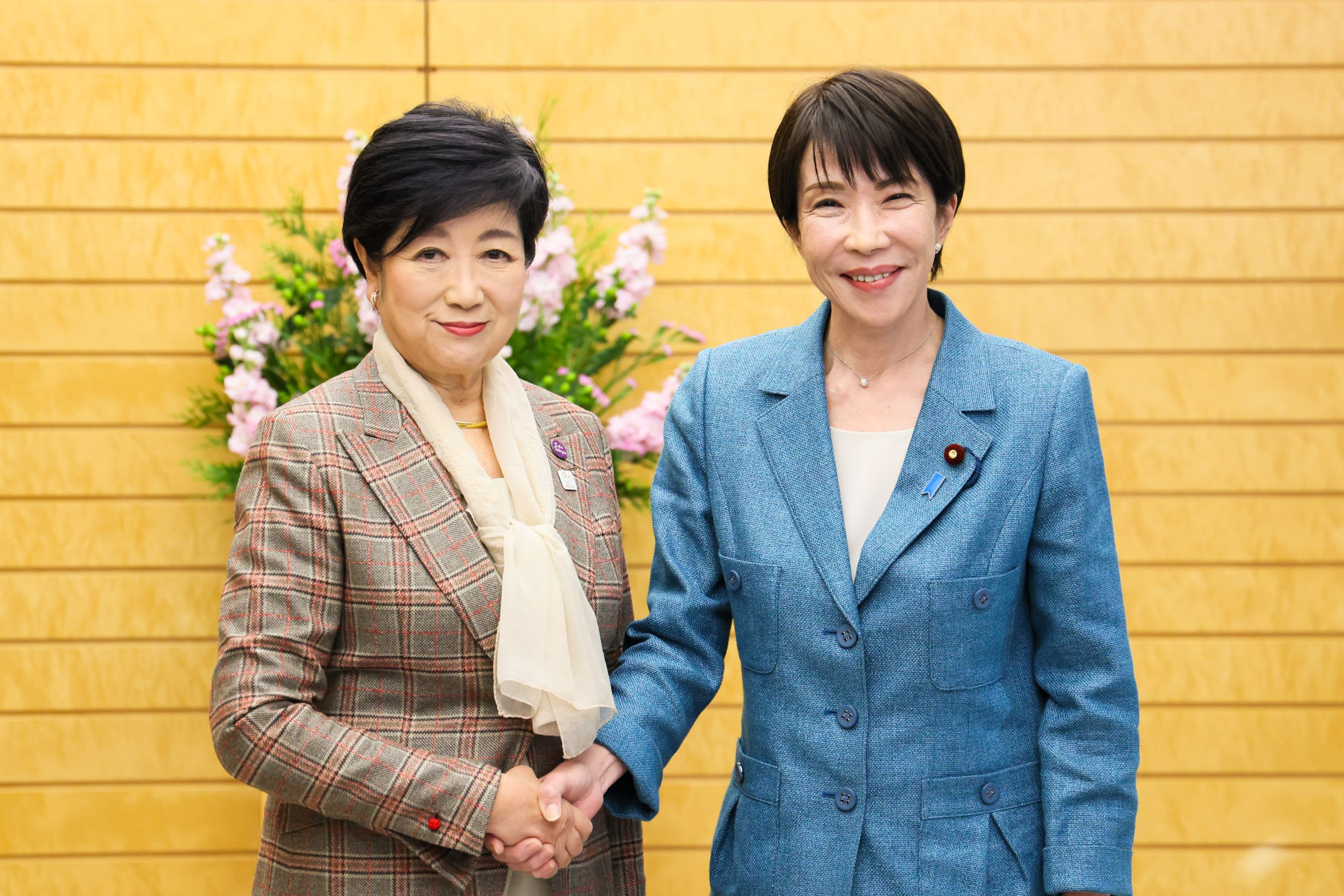
Governor Koike with Prime Minister Sanae Takaichi in 2025

After Masuzoe announced his resignation in June 2016, Koike announced her intention to run in the election for his successor. Koike stated that she would run "as an LDP lawmaker" but did not obtain the approval of the Tokyo LDP chapter before announcing her candidacy. The LDP officially endorsed Hiroya Masuda, and its Tokyo chapter issued a notice that any members supporting Koike would be punished. Nonetheless, several prominent LDP politicians continued to back Koike, while senior leaders such as Shinzo Abe refrained from making speeches in support of either candidate.

Koike was elected Governor of Tokyo on 31 July 2016, becoming the first woman in the post.

On 21 August 2016, at the 2016 Summer Olympics closing ceremony, Koike received the Olympic Flag, via Thomas Bach, from the mayor of Rio de Janeiro, Eduardo Paes.

On 31 May 2017, in advance of the upcoming local elections, Koike resigned from the Liberal Democratic Party and officially became the leader of Tomin First no Kai (Tokyoites First). Koike founded the group in 2016 in preparation for the elections and formed an alliance with Komeito in an effort to secure a governing majority in Tokyo's parliament. On 3 July 2017, the alliance took a majority in the prefectural election, pushing out the Liberal Democratic Party with a combined 79 seats of the 127-seat assembly.

Koike joined Shinzo Abe's cabinet, where the country led the government response to COVID-19 pandemic in Japan, as well as the postponement of 2020 Tokyo Summer Olympics to 2021. She served as governor during the successful completion of the Olympics and Paralympics in 2021. She passed the Olympic flag to Paris mayor Anne Hidalgo during the closing ceremony, marking the conclusion of the games. It was largely held behind closed doors with no public spectators permitted due to the declaration of a state of emergency in the Greater Tokyo Area in response to the pandemic, the only Olympic Games to be held without official spectators. (Note: Overseas spectators were first banned in March 2021, then followed by residents of Japan in July of that year to avoid any risk of a superspreading event.) The Games were the most expensive ever, with total spending of over $20 billion. There have been 788 cases detected and reported by the Tokyo 2020 Organising Committee between 1 July and 8 September 2021, with 66 additional cases being detected among Games personnel before that date after the Committee started recording them at an unknown date. The cases have sparked concerns prior to the games. The bubble surrounding the Olympic Village has been described as having been broken after the first case occurred there in mid-July.

On 14 August 2022, Governor of Jakarta Anies Baswedan paid a working visit to Japan to meet with his counterpart from Tokyo, Yuriko Koike, to discuss the potential for cooperation in several fields, including for environment-friendly public transportation. Baswedan posted a picture of the meeting with Koike at the Tokyo City Hall accompanied by several delegates on his personal Instagram account. However, the governor did not furnish further details on the potential for cooperation between the two cities and the length of his stay in Japan. However, Baswedan did invite Koike to attend the Urban 20 forum as a G20 side event in Jakarta at the end of August 2022. He later noted that Tokyo and Jakarta were sister cities, with longstanding relations. Hence, the meeting offered momentum to demonstrate commitment to intensifying relations between the two metropolitan cities.

Koike announced on 29 August 2022 that Tokyo would begin implementation of the world's fastest mobile internet network. Leading the charge is Manabu Miyasaka, the newly appointed counselor to the governor on digital transformation of Tokyo and former chairman of Yahoo! Japan Corporation.

Koike ran her platform based on seven zeros, which were basically socio-economic problems faced by residents of Tokyo. Out of these goals, she was able to reduce the number of children on waitlists to gain admission to daycares and cutting down the number of euthanized dogs and cats. However, critics say other goals like tackling the overwork culture, reducing crowding on rush hour trains, and getting rid of above-ground electricity poles have not yet been achieved.

Koike and her preferred candidate, Hirotada Ototake, placed fifth in the Tokyo 15th district by-election of lower house. This has caused discussion to increase on if Koike is losing much of her reputation as an intensely popular governor. This also came ahead of the next Tokyo gubernatorial election held in July 2024. The crushing loss Ototake faced was reported as potentially putting a damper on continuous rumors regarding her wish to return to national politics following her failure in the 2017 Japanese general election. However, exit polls projected after the 2024 Tokyo election that Koike would win a third term as governor.

On August 6, 2024, Koike fractured her left knee while making a ceremonial first pitch at a Central League baseball match at the Meiji Jingu Stadium, forcing her to work remotely.

== Political positions ==
Koike supports economic liberalism, promotes administrative and budgetary reform, and insists on further advancement of the status of women in the working world. In promising the pursuit of women-friendly policies, she has stated, "I believe that pushing policies for women will be good for Tokyo and bring happiness to the capital." Her stated basic principles and stance regarding political reform are encompassed by "The 5 Cs: Check, Challenge, Change, Creative and Communication". In terms of the economy, she has pushed for aggressive privatization of Japanese assets to diminish the government's debt burden. A strong turn towards IT development, natural sciences, sustainable infrastructure, and efficiency-based administrative reforms for public services were also on the docket. She is also one of the main figures in Japan's right-wing populist camp. She is also sometimes referred to as "ultraconservative".

=== Environmentalism ===
Having learned an environmental way of life from her own experience of wartime austerities in Egypt, Koike addresses environmental issues. She expressed the idea of introducing a carbon tax in 2005 so that Japan might achieve the goals of the Kyoto Protocol. The next year, she inaugurated the "Mottainai Furoshiki" campaign, which urges shoppers to use furoshiki in place of plastic shopping bags. She is against the use of biofuels made from food crops.

=== Nationalism and associated controversy ===
As a nationalist, Koike was one of the five vice secretaries general of the Diet Members' Committee of Nippon Kaigi, the country's largest conservative think tank and the main nationalist lobby, once chaired by Tarō Asō. She is also known to have powerful ties to other large conservative political groups.

As a Governor of Tokyo, she has been criticized for years by Japanese liberals and Koreans in both Japan and the Koreas for refusing to acknowledge the occurrence of the 1923 Kantō Massacre, which mainly targeted ethnic Koreans. Beginning in 2017, Koike broke decades of precedent by previous mayors by refusing to offer condolences to the descendants of survivors at an annual ceremony. She has since justified this by saying that whether a massacre occurred is a matter of historical debate.

Koike's possible affiliation with a far-right group was questioned in 2016, when a reporter asked about her speaking at a conference hosted by Japan Women's Group Gentle Breeze (日本女性の会そよ風; or "そよ風"), a women's non-profit with purported ties to anti-Korean hate group Zaitokukai. In response, Koike stated that she wasn't aware of the non-profit's ties to Zaitokukai, and that she is invited to speak at many events.

=== Position on Article 9 of constitution ===
Her foreign and security policies are often regarded as hawkish. She suggested that the prime minister revise the interpretation of Article 9 of the Constitution of Japan to enable the government to exercise the right to collective self-defense.

She has supported the United States and the war on terror and opposes the Japanese government's tradition of UN-centered foreign policy. However, she has sent mixed messages to the United States in terms of destabilizing the Middle East with democratization efforts. On the other hand, showing parts of the world how powerful the United States is as an ally is a priority. During the 2008 LDP leadership election, she pledged to make Russia return the four disputed islands to Japan if she was elected as prime minister. Back in 2010, she helped strengthen ties between Libya's Muammar Gaddafi and Japan. This led to the creation of the Japan-Libya Friendship Association.

=== Other positions ===
Koike has also actively promoted Japanese pop culture, appearing in cosplay as Sally from Sally the Witch in 2015, and stating during her 2016 Tokyo gubernatorial campaign that she wanted to turn all of Tokyo into an "anime land".

Koike initiated "Jisa Biz" (時差biz) in July 2017 to promote remote work and staggered work times to reduce traffic congestion during the morning rush hour in Tokyo.

In 2017, Koike launched and led a new national political party. It was called Kibō no Tō, which means "Party of Hope". Although still Governor of Tokyo, she was the primary leader of this party. It was assumed that this party could have been the main opposition to the LDP. On 22 October 2017, the Party of Hope did not perform as well at the polls as expected. Koike's overarching policies were similar to those of Prime Minister Shinzo Abe. The policy to set them apart was their differing opinions on nuclear energy. Koike was opposed to it as an advocate of the environment. Koike did not join any successor party to the Party of Hope at its April 2018 dissolution.

In 2023, she ranked 62nd in Forbes list of "World's 100 most powerful women".

== Notes ==
House of Representatives (Japan)
Preceded by Multi-member	Member of the House of Representatives for Hyōgo's 2nd district Multi-member; 1993–1996	Constituency abolished
New constituency	Member of the House of Representatives for Hyōgo's 6th district 1996–2003	Kōichirō Ichimura
Preceded by Proportional representation	Member of the House of Representatives for Kinki; 2003–2005	Succeeded by Proportional representation
Preceded by Kōki Kobayashi	Member of the House of Representatives for Tokyo's 10th district 2005–2009	Succeeded by Takako Ebata
Preceded by Proportional representation	Member of the House of Representatives for Tokyo; 2009–2016	Succeeded by Proportional representation
Political offices
Preceded by Shunichi Suzuki	Minister of the Environment; 2003–2006	Succeeded by Masatoshi Wakabayashi
Preceded by Toshimitsu Motegi	Minister of State for Okinawa and Northern Territories Affairs; 2004–2006	Succeeded by Sanae Takaichi
Preceded by Fumio Kyūma	Minister of Defense; 2007	Succeeded by Masahiko Kōmura
Preceded by Yōichi Masuzoe	Governor of Tokyo; 2016–present	Incumbent
