= 2026 Democratic Party for the People leadership election =

Political party election in Japan

2026 Democratic Party for the People presidential election
- 6 September 2026
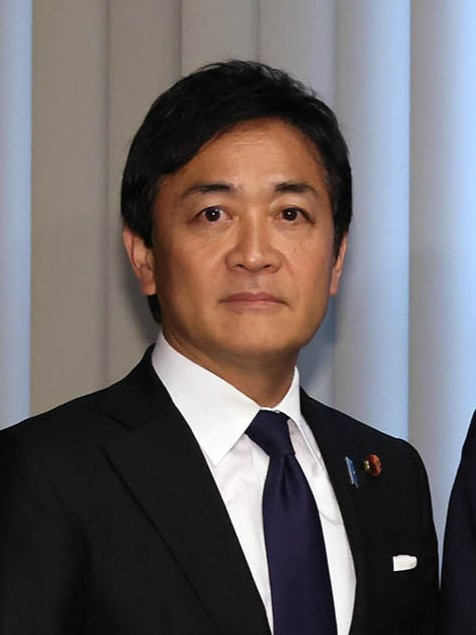

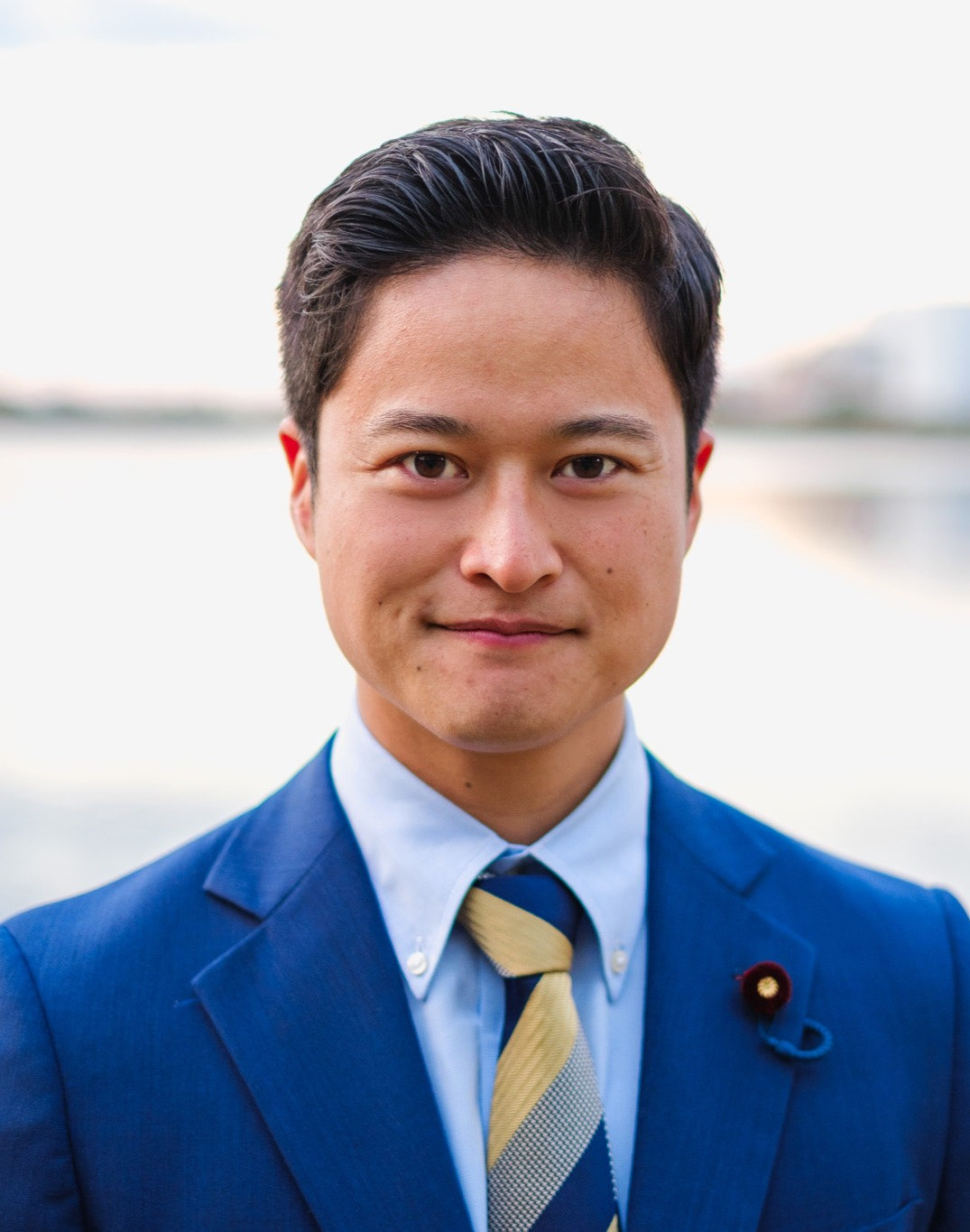
Candidate	Yuichiro Tamaki	Mikihiko Hashimoto
Leader's seat	Kagawa 2nd	North Kanto PR
Diet members	42	11
Party members	42	11
Local assembly	43	10
Total points	127 (79.9%)	32 (20.1%)
President before election
Yuichiro Tamaki
Elected President
Yuichiro Tamaki

The 2026 Democratic Party For the People presidential election was held on 6 September 2026 in accordance with the end of the presidential term which had commenced in 2023. Incumbent president Yuichiro Tamaki was re-elected overwhelmingly against second-term lawmaker Mikihiko Hashimoto.

== Background ==
Tamaki had served as president of the DPFP since its formation. Since his previous re-election in 2023, the party performed well in the 2024 and 2025 elections, more than doubling its seat count in both chambers of the Diet. Following the collapse of the LDP-Komeito coalition in October 2025, Tamaki was briefly floated as a possible Prime Minister in a coalition between the DPFP, Constitutional Democratic Party, and Japan Innovation Party, but the latter party ultimately joined the LDP coalition instead. In the lower house election held in February 2026, the party maintained its representation at 28 seats but found its influence reduced due to the ruling coalition's landslide majority.

== Electoral system ==
The number of sponsors required to run was set at 15% of the Diet caucus and an equal number of local assembly members. With the party counting 53 members of the Diet, this translated to eight legislators and eight local assembly members. The maximum number of sponsors in each category was 25.

The election was conducted via a points system:

- Each of the party's members of the National Diet had a vote worth one point. (53 points total)
- Registered party members or supporters could vote via mail or online. Points for this tier were awarded to candidates in proportion to votes won. (53 points total)
- Each of the party's members of local councils or prefectural assemblies could vote via mail or online. Points for this tier were awarded to candidates in proportion to votes won. (53 points total)

In order to win, a candidate must secure more than 50% of points. If no candidate won more than 50%, a runoff was to be held the same day. In the runoff, only Diet members may vote.

== Candidates ==
Candidate	Offices held
Yuichiro Tamaki (age 57); Kagawa Prefecture	Member of the House of Representatives (2009–); President of the Democratic Party for the People (2020–)
Mikihiko Hashimoto (age 30); Saitama Prefecture	Member of the House of Representatives (2024–)

=== Sponsors ===
Yuichiro Tamaki (20/20)	Mikihiko Hashimoto (8/8)
Diet members: Satoshi Asano; Tetsuji Isozaki; Tatsuo Ito; Yoshihiro Okumura; Takanori Kawai; Hitoshi Goto; Hitoshi Takezume; Ken Tanaka; Mami Tamura; Midori Tanno; Makiko Dougomi; Yukie Niwata; Makoto Hamaguchi; Yoshifumi Hamano; Hidekazu Harada; Kota Hirado; Jesús Fukasaku; Koichi Mukoyama; Toshihide Muraoka; Yoshihiko Yamada; Local assembly members: Tatsuo Ishiguro; Hirotaka Iwata; Tadashi Uezato; Tomoyuki Uesugi; Yosei Umetsu; Kazuya Ouchi; Kyoko Ota; Yohei Ogawa; Mizuho Kato; Chiharu Kitaoka; Yasuhiro Kogayu; Hideako Saito; Natsuki Shinoboro; Toru Takahashi; Yoko Tomoyasu; Taisuke Nakamura; Kanae Masumoto; Koichiro Maruyama; Motoshi Morii; Takuya Yoshio	Diet members: Yoshihiro Suzuki; Shinji Nagatomo; Ryotaro Konomi; Yoshitaka Nishioka; Hidetake Usuki; Kai Odake; Kumiko Ehara; Akihiro Kagoshima; Local assembly members: Takeshi Hayama; Ryo Maeda; Naoto Okabayashi; Kazuyuki Sada; Itsuki Higuma; Tetsuya Fukunaga; Kenta Wakasa; Gohei Tomita

== Contest ==
Tamaki was widely expected to run again and be easily returned to office. An information session for the contest was held on 24 July, which was attended by Tamaki, Mikihiko Hashimoto, Yosuke Mori, and Kamon Iizumi. the Mainichi Shimbun reported that the former three were prospective candidates, while Iizumi was acting as the scout for a camp within the party who had not yet found a candidate. Nominations were taken on 7 August and only Tamaki and Hashimoto stood.

Both candidates emphasised strengthening the party's organisation. Tamaki acknowledged that the party had been dominated by its founding members and advocated development of local engagement and young talent. Hashimoto said he wanted Tamaki and secretary-general Kazuya Shimba to "continue contributing their strengths". Tamaki defended his "solutions over confrontation" strategy which encouraged policy engagement with the ruling coalition, while Hashimoto argued the party's approach should be regularly reevaluated. Tamaki also stated his aim for the DPFP was to become the strongest opposition party in the 2028 House of Councillors election.

== Results ==
Tamaki was overwhelmingly re-elected, securing his largest margin to date with 79.9% of points.

Candidate	Diet members			Party members & supporters			Local assembly members			Total
Candidate	Votes	%	Points	Votes	%	Points	Votes	%	Points	Total
Yuichiro Tamaki	42	79.2	42	15,451	80.2	42	284	80.9	43	127
Mikihiko Hashimoto	11	20.8	11	3,803	19.8	11	67	19.1	10	32
Total	53	100.0	53	19,254	100.0	53	351	100.0	53	159
Invalid	0			67			1			
Turnout	53	100.0		19,321	39.0		352	91.2		
Eligible	53									
Source: Democratic Party For the People
