= Taisuke Ono =

Japanese politician (born 1974)

- 小野 泰輔
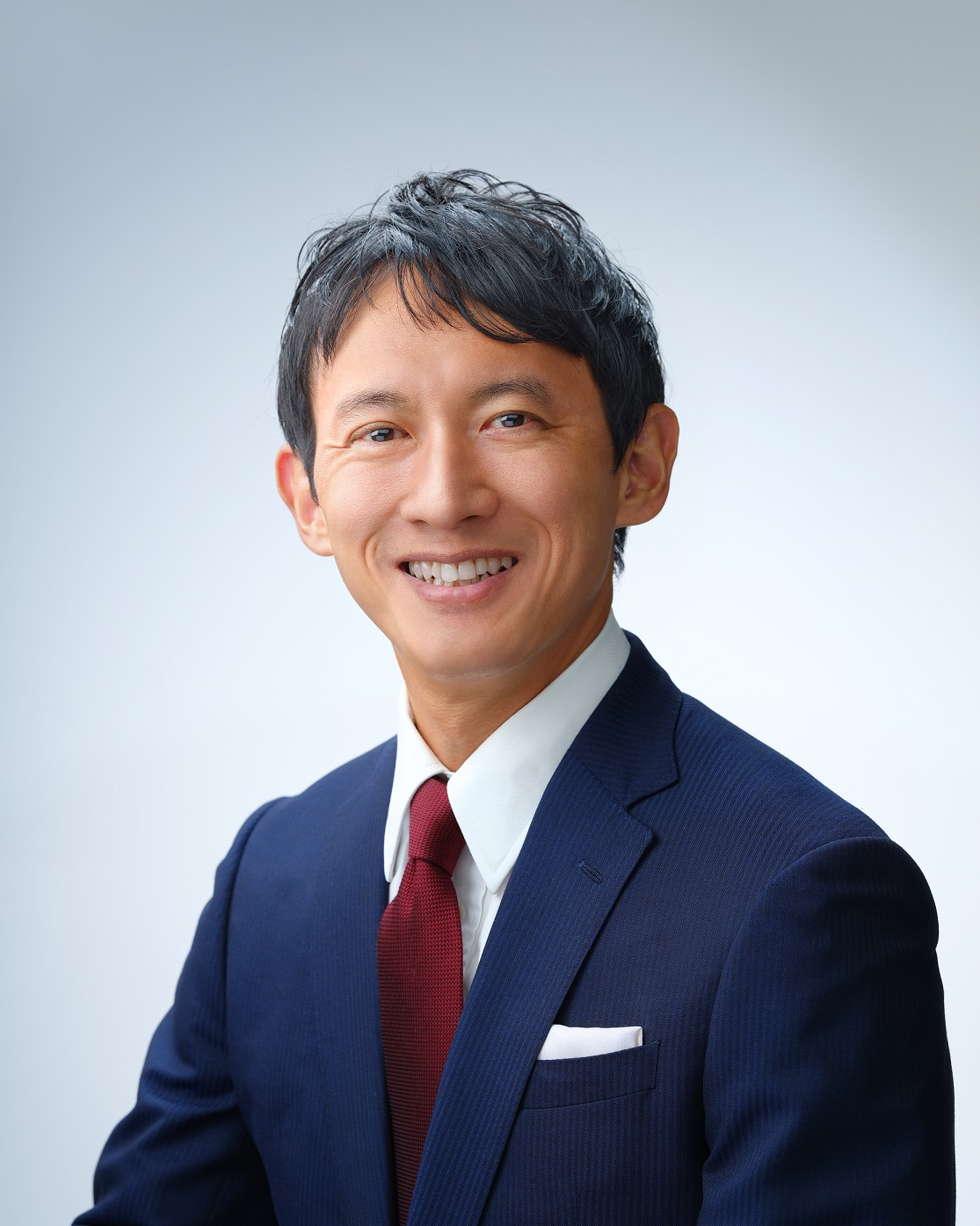
- Ono in September 2021

Mayor of Yatsushiro
- Incumbent
- Assumed office 4 September 2025
- Preceded by: Hiroo Nakamura

Member of the House of Representatives
- In office 5 November 2021 – 28 October 2024
- Constituency: Tokyo PR

Vice Governor of Kumamoto Prefecture
- In office 21 June 2012 – 8 June 2020
- Governor: Ikuo Kabashima

Personal details
- Born: 20 April 1974 (age 52) Meguro, Tokyo, Japan
- Party: Innovation
- Education: University of Tokyo

Taisuke Ono (小野 泰輔, Ono Taisuke; born 20 April 1974) is a Japanese politician who has served as mayor of Yatsushiro since 2025.

He previously served as a member of the House of Representatives as a member of the Japan Innovation Party, having been elected in the 2021 Japanese general election from the Tokyo proportional representation block. Before that he was Vice Governor of Kumamoto Prefecture under Ikuo Kabashima for eight years. He also ran in the 2020 Tokyo gubernatorial election under the Innovation banner, winning 612,530 votes and 9.99% of the vote.

== Early life and education ==
Ono was born in Meguro, Tokyo, on 20 April 1974. He lived in Akahi for most of his childhood, and then moved to Kodaira in 1983. He then graduated from schooling in 1993, and began to attend classes at the Department of Liberal Arts inside the University of Tokyo. There, he first attended a lecture by Ikuo Kabashima.

After graduating from the law school within the University of Tokyo, he joined Anderson Consulting (Now known as Accenture) as a consultant in 1999. He then worked as the public secretary of Masayuki Fujishima, a Liberal Party member of the House of Representatives, in-between 2000 and 2002.

== Vice Governor of Kumamoto ==
As Kabashima ran for governor of Kunamoto in 2008, Ono, who had been a student under him, signed up to assist his former teacher. After Kabashima won the election, Ono became the prefecture's policy coordinating advisor.

Four years later, at the age of 38, Ono was appointed to be one of the two Vice Governors of the prefecture, making him the youngest vice governor in the country. In 2016, he was re-appointed as vice governor by the prefectural assembly after a personnel proposal. He chaired a conference dedicated to the recovery of tourism in the prefecture later that year following the 2016 Kumamoto earthquakes. Following the end of his second four year term, Ono had initially planned to attempt to receive a third term as deputy. After Governor Kabashima told him to look for other ways to make use of his political experience, however, he decided against it.

== 2020 Tokyo gubernatorial election ==
On 2 June 2020, he held a press conference in a hotel in Kumamoto, announcing that he would run in the 2020 Tokyo gubernatorial election. On 7 June, he met with Japan Innovation Party leaders Ichirō Matsui and Nobuyuki Baba, with Hirofumi Yanagase also being in attendance. Ono requested a recommendation from Matsui and Baba to run, and received one, with Matsui reportedly encouraging Ono to seek the office. A day later, he formally resigned from his role as Vice Governor.

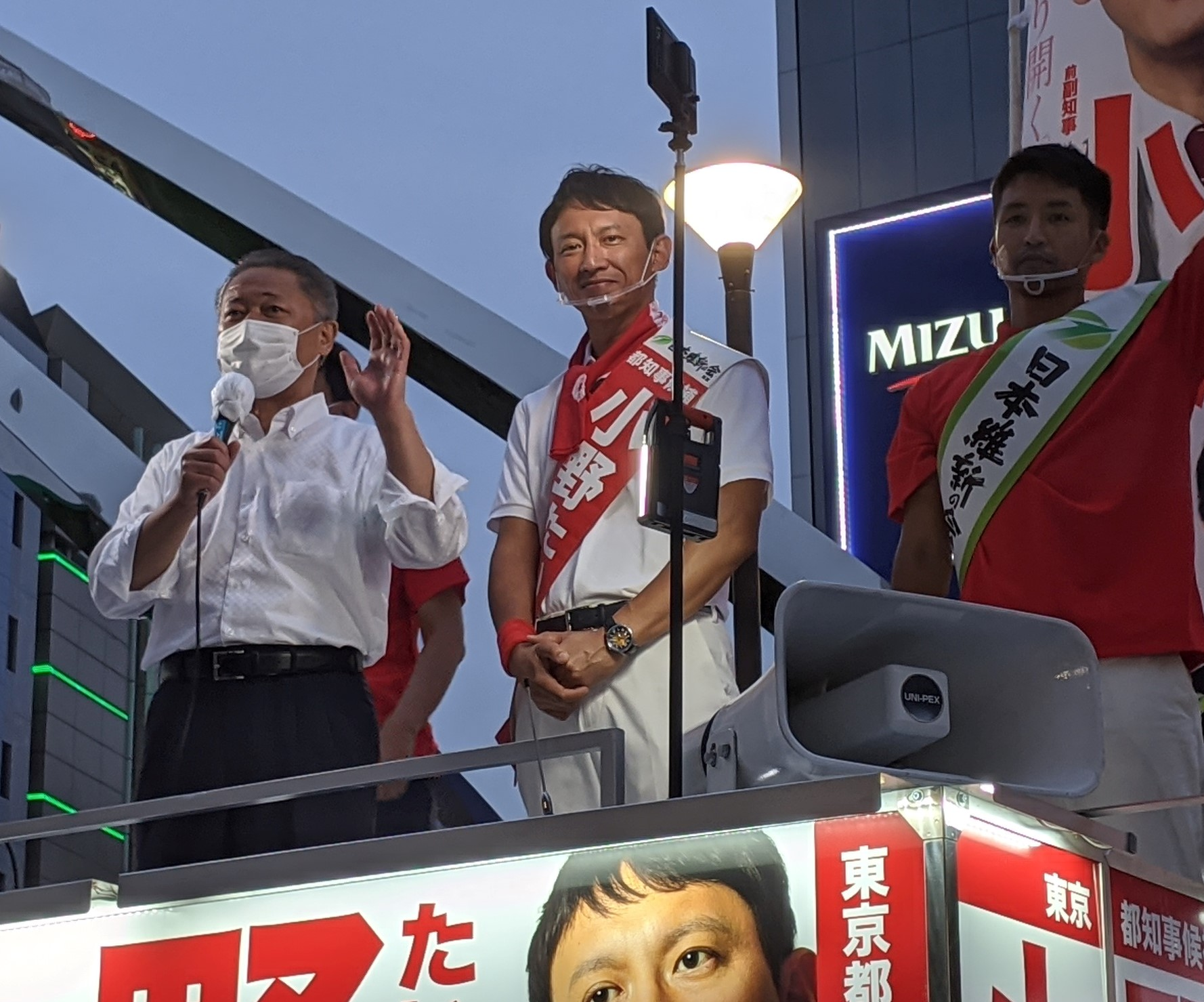
Ono (Center) campaigning with JIP General Secretary Nobuyuki Baba (Left)

He held another press conference on the ninth in the Tokyo Metropolitan Government building, with Yanagase once again being in attendance as well as Councillors Shun Otokita and Mitsuko Ishii. There, he formally announced his recommendation for the JIP nomination, receiving it a few days later and beginning to campaign for the party in Tokyo. During campaigning, he received the support of ex-foreign minister Seiji Maehara of the DPFP, on top of the rest of the JIP power structure such as Baba and Matsui. On election night, he placed fourth, winning 9.99% of the vote. Nevertheless, he was 738 votes short for the return of the 3 million yen election deposit.

== House of Representatives ==
Following the gubernatorial election, it was announced that Ono would be the JIP's candidate for the Tokyo 1st district in the 2021 general election. He ran against LDP candidate Miki Yamada and CDP candidate Banri Kaieda, who had previously served as President of the Democratic Party of Japan. Ono placed third, while Kaieda placed second and Yamada won the district; however, both Kaieda and Ono won seats as they had been placed on the Tokyo proportional representation block. Ono won 23.7% of the vote.

In December 2022, it was announced that he would be running for Tokyo's 7th district, following the redistricting of constituencies. He placed third with 22% of the vote, as LDP Abe faction affiliate Tamayo Marukawa drew 27%. They were both defeated by Akihiro Matsuo, who drew over 40% of the vote. As Ishin struggled proportionally outside of Osaka, and only won two seats on the Tokyo proportional representation block, every candidate was ranked 1st so as to ensure that margin of defeat ranked candidates. Since Ono had a margin of defeat of 55%, compared to Sachiko Inokuchi's 66% and Tsukasa Abe's 76%, he did not receive a seat. Had Ishin won three proportional seats, he would have won one.

In August 2025, he was elected mayor of Yatsushiro in Kumamoto Prefecture, defeating the incumbent Hiroo Nakamura. He took office the following month.

== Personal life ==
Ono is married, and has a wife along with a son and two daughters. In November 2015, he was diagnosed with lung cancer. He underwent surgery in December, and part of his right lung was removed as a result. He returned to public service in January 2016.
