= Japanese Senate national proportional representation block =

National electoral district

Senate proportional district Sangiin hirei-ku
- Parliamentary constituency for the Senate
- Population: 127,313,275 (est. 2018)
- Electorate: 105,019,203 (2022)

Current constituency
- Created: 1983
- Number of members: 100 (staggered 2×50)
- Created from: House of Councillors national district

The Japanese National Proportional Representation Block, known in Japan as the Senate proportional district (参議院比例区, Sangiin hirei-ku) is an electoral district for the Senate (formerly known as the House of Councillors), the upper house of the National Diet of Japan. It consists of the whole nation and elects 50 members per election, 100 in total (fully effective after the 2022 regular election), by D'Hondt method proportional representation (PR).

== History ==
Proportional voting was introduced to Japan in the 1983 House of Councillors election. The proportional district replaced the previous nationwide district (全国区, zenkoku-ku) which elected 100 members of the House of Councillors (50 per election) by single non-transferable vote, i.e. votes were for individuals not parties as in the prefectural districts. Initially, the proportional representation block also elected 50 members, but was reduced to 48 members in the 2001 election, bringing the total of proportional members down to 96 in 2004.

From 1983 to 1998, the vote in the proportional district of the House of Councillors had to be for a party, lists were closed. Since the 2001 election there is the option to cast a preference vote for a single candidate instead, the vote then counts for both the party in the allocation of proportional seats to party lists, as well as the candidate in the ordering of party lists. From 2001 to 2016, the system was a most open list system: The ranking of candidates on a party list strictly followed the number of preference votes. This ranking also applies to the runner-up replacements in case of vacancies.

In the 2019 election, the proportional district was enlarged to 50 members, and the election system was modified to no longer be fully open. In a so-called tokutei-waku (特定枠; lit. 'special frame'), parties may now choose to prioritize certain proportional candidates, such protected candidates can no longer be elected personally, but always come first in the allocation of proportional seats.

Unlike elections to the House of Representatives, where a proportional segment was introduced in 1996, a simultaneous dual candidacy in both the majoritarian and the proportional election is not allowed in the Senate.

== Summary of results for major parties ==
Ruling parties at the time of the election are bolded.

Proportional results in regular Senate elections
Election	LDP		JSP/SDP		DPJ/CDP		JCP		Komeito		Others	
Election	Votes	Seats	Votes	Seats	Votes	Seats	Votes	Seats	Votes	Seats	Votes	Seats
1983	35.3%	19	16.3%	9	–	–	8.9%	7	15.7%	8	8.4%	4
1986	38.6%	22	17.2%	9	–	–	9.5%	4	13.0%	7	6.9%	3
1989	27.3%	15	35.1%	20	–	–	7.0%	4	10.9%	6	4.9%	2
1992	33.0%	19	17.6%	10	–	–	7.8%	4	14.8%	8	5.0%	3
1995	27.3%	15	16.9%	9	–	–	9.5%	5	–	–	30.8%	18
1998	25.2%	14	7.8%	4	–	–	14.6%	8	13.8%	7	21.7%	12
2001	38.6%	20	6.6%	3	–	–	7.9%	4	15.0%	8	16.4%	8
2004	30.6%	15	5.5%	3	–	–	8.0%	4	15.7%	8	38.6%	19
2007	28.1%	14	4.5%	2	–	–	7.5%	3	13.2%	7	41.2%	21
2010	24.1%	12	3.9%	2	–	–	6.1%	3	13.1%	6	31.6%	16
2013	34.7%	18	2.4%	1	8.9%	5	9.7%	5	14.2%	7	26.3%	17
2016	35.9%	19	2.7%	1	10.1%	5	10.7%	5	13.5%	7	31.2%	15
2019	35.4%	19	2.1%	1	7.9%	4	9.0%	4	13.1%	7	37.6%	15
2022	34.4%	18	2.4%	1	7.3%	3	6.8%	3	11.7%	6	33.6%	17

== Recent results ==
The total (party+preference) proportional votes, vote shares and allocated seats for each party are in the top row. Below are all elected candidates with number of preference votes in bold, and runner-up plus losing incumbents if any. "..." indicates higher-ranking losing non-incumbents. For parties without any seat, the top two candidates are listed with their personal votes.

=== 2025 ===
2025 House of Councillors Election: National PR Block Summary
Party	Candidates	Votes	%	+/–	Seats				
Party	Candidates	Votes	%	+/–	Up	Won	Not up	Total	+/-
Liberal Democratic	1. **Shōji Maitachi (elected 1st)**; 2. **Mamoru Fukuyama (elected 5th)**; 3. **Shūsaku Indō (elected 8th)**; 4. **Tarō Yamada (elected 13th)**; 5. **Shigenori Kenzaka (elected 17th)**; 6. **Hideki Higashino (elected 22nd)**; 7. **Seiko Hashimoto (elected 27th)**; 8. **Satoshi Kamayachi (elected 29th)**; 9. **Haruko Arimura (elected 37th)**; 10. **Masahiro Ishida (elected 40th)**; 11. **Akiko Honda (elected 45th)**; 12. **Muneo Suzuki (elected 48th)**; 13. Masahisa Satō; 14. Masao Miyazaki; 15. Akiko Santō; 16. Hiroyuki Kishi; 17. Masaaki Akaike; 18. Natsumi Higa; 19. Masashi Tanaka; 20. Yasuhisa Abe; 21. Daisaku Miyabo; 22. Hiroshi Tanaka; 23. Mio Sugida; 24. Masamune Wada; 25. Masayuki Saitō; 26. Mamoru Shigemoto; 27. Takashi Nagao; 28. Fish Tanaka; 29. Rie Saitō; 30. Shōgo Azemoto; 31. Makoto Fujida	12,808,306	21.64	▼12.76	19	12	18	30	▼7
Democratic Party For the People	1. **Mami Tamura (elected 2nd)**; 2. **Yoshifumi Hamano (elected 10th)**; 3. **Tetsuji Isozaki (elected 18th)**; 4. **Tatsuo Itō (elected 24th)**; 5. **Yasushi Adachi (elected 30th)**; 6. **Kōta Hirado (elected 41st)**; 7. **Yoshihiko Yamada (elected 47th)**; 8. Genki Sudō; 9. Yuriko Ōtani; 10. Takaki Ono; 11. Kaori Kido; 12. Michiyo Yakushiji; 13. Hiroko Ōtsu; 14. Shingo Fujii; 15. Toyoshi Aramaki; 16. Minoru Kawasaki; 17. Yoshigazu Sasaki; 18. Yūki Takeda; 19. Seigo Miyairi	7,620,493	12.88	▲6.92	3	7	3	10	▲4
Sanseitō	1. **Mizuho Umemura (elected 3rd)**; 2. **Yūji Adachi (elected 11th)**; 3. **Hiroshi Andō (elected 19th)**; 4. **Manabu Matsuda (elected 25th)**; 5. **Mana Iwamoto (elected 33rd)**; 6. **Sen Yamanaka (elected 42nd)**; 7. **Shōta Gotō (elected 49th)**; 8. Yuichiro Kawa; 9. Takami Shigenmatsu; 10. Kazuhiro Teranishi	7,425,053	12.55	▲9.22	–	7	1	8	▲7
Constitutional Democratic	1. **Renhō (elected 4th)**; 2. **Makiko Kishi (elected 12th)**; 3. **Saori Yoshikawa (elected 20th)**; 4. **Shunichi Mizuoka (elected 26th)**; 5. **Masahito Ozawa (elected 34th)**; 6. **Ryō Kōriyama (elected 43rd)**; 7. **Yūko Mori (elected 50th)**; 8. Shinkun Haku; 9. Taiga Ishikawa; 10. Takashi Moriya; 11. Ryūhei Kawada; 12. Shinpei Ōta; 13. Masahiro Kimura; 14. Nami Haraya; 15. Reiko Hirahara; 16. Masayuki Watanabe; 17. Norie Ochi; 18. Yōko Furuyama; 19. Yahachirō Ebada; 20. Hirohide Terada; 21. Katsuya Nishino; 22. Wakako Tokuda	7,397,456	12.50	▼0.27	8	7	7	14	▼1
Komeitō	1. **Daisaku Hiraki (elected 6th)**; 2. **Takashi Tsukasa (elected 16th)**; 3. **Masafumi Sasaki (elected 28th)**; 4. **Daijirō Harada (elected 38th)**; 5. Yoshihiro Kawano; 6. Hideki Niizuma; 7. Aya Kawai; 8. Hiroaki Shiota; 9. Masatoshi Muraoka; 10. Kyōko Nakakita; 11. Jirō Takahashi; 12. Hiroko Takehara; 13. Masato Takeshima; 14. Haruka Mizushima; 15. Nobushiro Fujii; 16. Masafumi Haba; 17. Kyōsuke Kōjin	5,210,569	8.80	▼2.86	7	4	6	10	▼3
Ishin no Kai	1. **Yukiko Kada (elected 7th)**; **2. Megumi Ishi (elected 21st)**; 3. **Takumi Shibata (elected 35th)**; 4. **Hei Seki (elected 46th)**; 5. Hironobu Fujiwara; 6. Yūda Kubo. 7. Shōei Murayma; 8. Hironobu Yanagase; 9. Kazuyuki Yamaguchi; 10. Teruaki Kanbe; 11. Yasushi Miyazawa; 12. Noboru Akamine; 13. Tatsuki Nanbara	4,375,926	7.39	▼7.41	5	4	8	12	▼1
Reiwa Shinsengumi	1. **Kenji Isezaki (elected 9th)**; 2. **Eiko Kimura (elected 23rd)**; 3. **Fumiyo Okuda (elected 39th)**; 4. Maya Okamoto; 5. Misao Redwolf; 6. Tōru Hasuike; 7. Uiko Hasegawa; 8. Chihiro Tsujimura; 9. Tōma Nitōbe; 10. Kōichirō Yoshida; 11. Minoru Shiozaki; 12. Satomi Ikezawa	3,879,914	6.56	▲2.19	2	3	2	5	▲1
Conservative Party of Japan	1. **Haruo Kitamura (elected 14th)**; 2. **Naoki Hyakuta (elected 32nd)**; 3. Kaori Aritomo; 4. Katsuhiko Umehara	2,982,093	5.04	new	–	2	–	2	new
Japanese Communist Party	1. **Akira Koike (elected 15th)**; 2. **Yōko Shirakawa (elected 36th)**; 3. Yoshiki Yamashita; 4. Satoshi Inoue; 5. Kazuya Hatayma; 6. Minori Yamada; 7. Ayako Taira; 8. Kazuko Itō; 9. Yukiko Yano; 10. Hiroko Akaishi; 11. Kazue Fukushima; 12. Tomoko Oyamada; 13. Kōichi Suzuki; 14. Nobuhide Nishiyama; 15. Makoto Matsuzaki; 16. Mayumi Ōgishi; 17. Yoshitaka Iwamoto; 18. Masato Fujimoto; 19. Satomi Sumiyori	2,864,738	4.84	▼1.98	4	2	3	5	▼2
Team Mirai	1. **Takahiro Anno (elected 31st)**; 2. Satoshi Takayama; 3. Eitarō Suda	1,517,890	2.56	new	–	1	–	1	new
Social Democratic Party	1. **LaSalle Ishii (elected 44th)**; 2. Yūko Ōtsubaki; 3. Hiroji Yamashiro; 4. Masayasu Kai; 5. Shigeru Hanaoka	1,217,823	2.06	▼0.31	1	1	1	2	Steady
NHK Party	1. Satoshi Hamada; 2. Katsuya Fukunaga; 3. Takahiro Kawasaki	682,626	1.15	▼1.21	1	0	1	1	▼1
Saisei no Michi	1. Jin Urano; 2. Haruki Yokoyama; 3. Manabu Kobayashi; 4. Yoshiro Ōtani; 5. Yasuo Kijima; 6. Haruki Gibo; 7. Takao Miyata; 8. Jyunya Mizuno; 9. Kyōta Kanai	524,787	0.89	new	–	–	–	–	–
Nippon Seishinkai	1. Toshiaki Yoshino; 2. Kuniya Kihara	333,263	0.56	new	–	–	–	–	–
Independent Coalition	1. Tsuneki Ōnishi; 2. Akiko Fujimura	289,222	0.49	new	–	–	–	–	–
Reform Party of Japan	1. Ryōji Kutsuzawa	55,232	0.09	new	–	–	–	–	–
**Total**		**59,185,391**	**100.00**	–	**50**	**50**	**50**	**100**	–
Valid votes		59,185,735	97.65						
Invalid/blank votes		1,422,497	2.35						
Total votes		**60,608,232**	–						
Registered voters/turnout		103,591,806	58.51						
Source: https://www.nhk.or.jp/senkyo/database/sangiin/00/hsm12.html

=== 2019 ===
2019 House of Councillors election – National Block results (Note: These are full official results including decimals stemming from fractional votes; in the proportional district, they occur very often due to the high number of candidates and thus potential ambiguities. Elsewhere, election results are sometimes edited to contain no decimals; even then, whole numbers do not always represent whole votes, but may contain whole fractions of larger numbers of ambiguous votes.)
Party	Votes	%	Seats	Elected candidates
Liberal Democratic Party (LDP)	17,712,373	35.4%	19	1. Tōru Miki (protected) – 600,190; 2. Yasushi Miura (protected) – 540,078; 3. Yoshifumi Tsuge – 288,080; 4. Tarō Yamada – 237,432; 5. Masamune Wada – 232,549; 6. Masahisa Satō – 225,617; 7. Nobuaki Satō – 217,620; 8. Seiko Hashimoto – 206,221; 9. Toshio Yamada – 202,122; 10. Haruko Arimura – 189,893; 11. Shōji Miyamoto – 178,210; 12. Masahiro Ishida – 159,596; 13. Tsuneo Kitamura – 154,578; 14. Akiko Honda – 152,808; 15. Seiichi Etō – 137,502; 16. Takashi Hanyūda – 133,646; 17. Masao Miyazaki – 131,727; 18. Akiko Santō – 114,596; 19. Masaaki Akaike – 92,420
Constitutional Democratic Party (CDP)	7,917,721	15.8%	8	1. Makiko Kishi – 157,849; 2. Shunichi Mizuoka – 148,309; 3. Masahito Ozawa – 144,751; 4. Saori Yoshikawa – 143,472; 5. Takashi Moriya – 104,339; 6. Ryūhei Kawada – 94,702; 7. Taiga Ishikawa – 73,799; 8. Genki Sudo – 73,787
Kōmeitō	6,536,336	13.1%	7	1. Kanae Yamamoto – 594,289; 2. Hiroshi Yamamoto – 471,760; 3. Kaneshige Wakamatsu – 342,356; 4. Yoshihiro Kawano – 328,659; 5. Hideki Niizuma – 281,832; 6. Daisaku Hiraki – 183,869; 7. Hiroaki Shiota – 15,178
Nippon Ishin no Kai	4,907,844	9.8%	5	1. Muneo Suzuki – 220,743; 2. Kunihiko Muroi – 87,188; 3. Satoshi Umemura – 58,270; 4. Takumi Shibata – 53,938; 5. Hirofumi Yanagase – 53,086
Japanese Communist Party	4,483,411	9.0%	4	1. Akira Koike – 158,621; 2. Yoshiki Yamashita – 48,932; 3. Satoshi Inoue – 42,982; 4. Tomoko Kami – 34,696
Democratic Party for the People	3,481,078	7.0%	3	1. Mami Tamura – 260,324; 2. Tetsuji Isozaki – 258,507; 3. Yoshifumi Hamano – 256,929
Reiwa Shinsengumi	2,280,253	4.6%	2	1. Yasuhiko Funago (protected) – 991,757; 2. Eiko Kimura (protected) – 20,557
Social Democratic Party (SDP)	1,046,012	2.1%	1	1. Tadatomo Yoshida – 149,287
NHK Party	987,885	2.0%	1	1. Takashi Tachibana – 130,233 (resigned Oct 2019); 2. Satoshi Hamada – 9,309 (replacement)
Euthanasia Party	269,052	0.5%	0	–
Happiness Realization Party	202,279	0.4%	0	–

=== 2016 ===
2016 House of Councillors election – National Block results
Party	Votes	%	Seats	Elected candidates
Liberal Democratic Party (LDP)	20,114,788	35.9%	19	1. Masayuki Tokushige (521,060); 2. Shigeharu Aoyama (481,890); 3. Satsuki Katayama (393,382); 4. Satoshi Nakanishi (392,433); 5. Eriko Imai (319,359); 6. Toshiyuki Adachi (293,735); 7. Eriko Yamatani (249,844); 8. Shin'ya Fujiki (236,119); 9. Hanako Jimi (210,562); 10. Kanehiko Shindō (182,467); 11. Emiko Takagai (177,810); 12. Hiroshi Yamada (149,833); 13. Toshiyuki Fujii (142,132); 14. Masashi Adachi (139,110); 15. Takashi Uto (137,993); 16. Katsumi Ogawa (130,101); 17. Yoshifumi Miyajima (122,833); 18. Toshiei Mizuochi (114,485); 19. Shūkō Sonoda (101,154)
Democratic Party (DP)	11,751,015	21.0%	11	1. Masao Kobayashi (270,285); 2. Makoto Hamaguchi (266,623); 3. Wakako Yata (215,823); 4. Yoshifu Arita (205,884); 5. Takanori Kawai (196,023); 6. Shōji Nanba (191,823); 7. Takashi Esaki (184,187); 8. Masayoshi Nataniya (176,683); 9. Michihiro Ishibashi (171,486); 10. Kenzō Fujisue (143,188); 11. Shinkun Haku (138,813)
Kōmeitō	7,572,960	13.5%	7	1. Hiroaki Nagasawa (942,266); 2. Kōzō Akino (612,068); 3. Shin'ichi Yokoyama (606,889); 4. Seishi Kumano (605,223); 5. Masaaki Taniai (478,174); 6. Masayoshi Hamada (388,477); 7. Masaru Miyazaki (18,571)
Japanese Communist Party	6,016,195	10.7%	4	1. Tadayoshi Ichida (77,348); 2. Tomoko Tamura (49,113); 3. Mikishi Daimon (33,078); 4. Tomo Iwabuchi (31,099)
Osaka Ishin no Kai	5,153,584	9.2%	4	1. Toranosuke Katayama (194,902); 2. Yoshimi Watanabe (143,343); 3. Mitsuko Ishii (68,147); 4. Akira Ishii (50,073)
Social Democratic Party (SDP)	1,536,239	2.7%	1	1. Mizuho Fukushima (254,956)
People's Life Party	1,067,301	1.9%	1	1. Ai Aoki (109,050)
Party for Japanese Kokoro	734,024	1.3%	0	–
No Party to Support	647,071	1.1%	0	–
New Renaissance Party	580,653	1.0%	0	–
Angry Voice of the Citizens	466,706	0.8%	0	–
Happiness Realization Party	366,815	0.6%	0	–

=== 2013 ===
2013 House of Councillors election – National Block results
Party	Votes	%	Seats	Elected candidates
LDP	18,460,404	34.7%	18	1. Yoshifumi Tsuge – 429,002; 2. Toshio Yamada – 338,485; 3. Masahisa Satō – 326,541; 4. Midori Ishii – 294,148; 5. Seiko Hashimoto – 279,952; 6. Takashi Hanyūda – 249,818; 7. Nobuaki Satō – 215,506; 8. Masaaki Akaike – 208,319; 9. Akiko Santō – 205,779; 10. Seiichi Etō – 204,404; 11. Masahiro Ishida – 201,109; 12. Haruko Arimura – 191,343; 13. Shūji Miyamoto – 178,480; 14. Kazuya Maruyama – 153,303; 15. Tsuneo Kitamura – 142,613; 16. Miki Watanabe – 104,176; 17. Yoshio Kimura – 98,979; 18. Fusae Ōta – 77,173
Kōmeitō	7,568,080	14.2%	7	1. Kanae Yamamoto – 996,959; 2. Daisaku Hiraki – 770,682; 3. Yoshihiro Kawano – 703,637; 4. Hiroshi Yamamoto – 592,814; 5. Kaneshige Wakamatsu – 577,951; 6. Yūichirō Uozumi – 540,817; 7. Hideki Niizuma – 26,044
Democratic Party of Japan	7,268,653	13.4%	7	1. Tetsuji Isozaki – 271,553; 2. Yoshifumi Hamano – 235,917; 3. Kumiko Aihara – 235,636; 4. Kusuo Ōshima – 191,167; 5. Mieko Kamimoto – 176,248; 6. Saori Yoshikawa – 167,437; 7. Toshio Ishigami – 152,121
Japan Restoration Party	6,355,299	11.9%	6	1. Antonio Inoki – 356,605; 2. Kyōko Nakayama – 306,341; 3. Mitsuo Gima – 40,484; 4. Takeshi Fujimaki – 33,237; 5. Masashi Nakano – 32,926; 6. Kunihiko Muroi – 32,107
Japanese Communist Party	5,154,055	9.7%	5	1. Akira Koike – 134,325; 2. Yoshiki Yamashita – 129,149; 3. Tomoko Kami – 68,729; 4. Satoshi Inoue – 50,874; 5. Kōhei Nihi – 39,768
Your Party	4,755,160	8.9%	4	1. Ryūhei Kawada – 117,389; 2. Kazuyuki Yamaguchi – 75,000; 3. Michitarō Watanabe – 50,253; 4. Yoshiyuki Inoue – 47,756
SDP	1,255,235	2.4%	1	1. Seiji Mataichi – 156,155
People's Life Party	492,040	0.9%	0	–
New Party Daichi	273,356	0.5%	0	–
Greens Japan	246,020	0.5%	0	–
Green Wind	218,685	0.4%	0	–
Happiness Realization Party	109,342	0.2%	0	–
