= Akiko Honda =

Japanese politician

- 本田 顕子
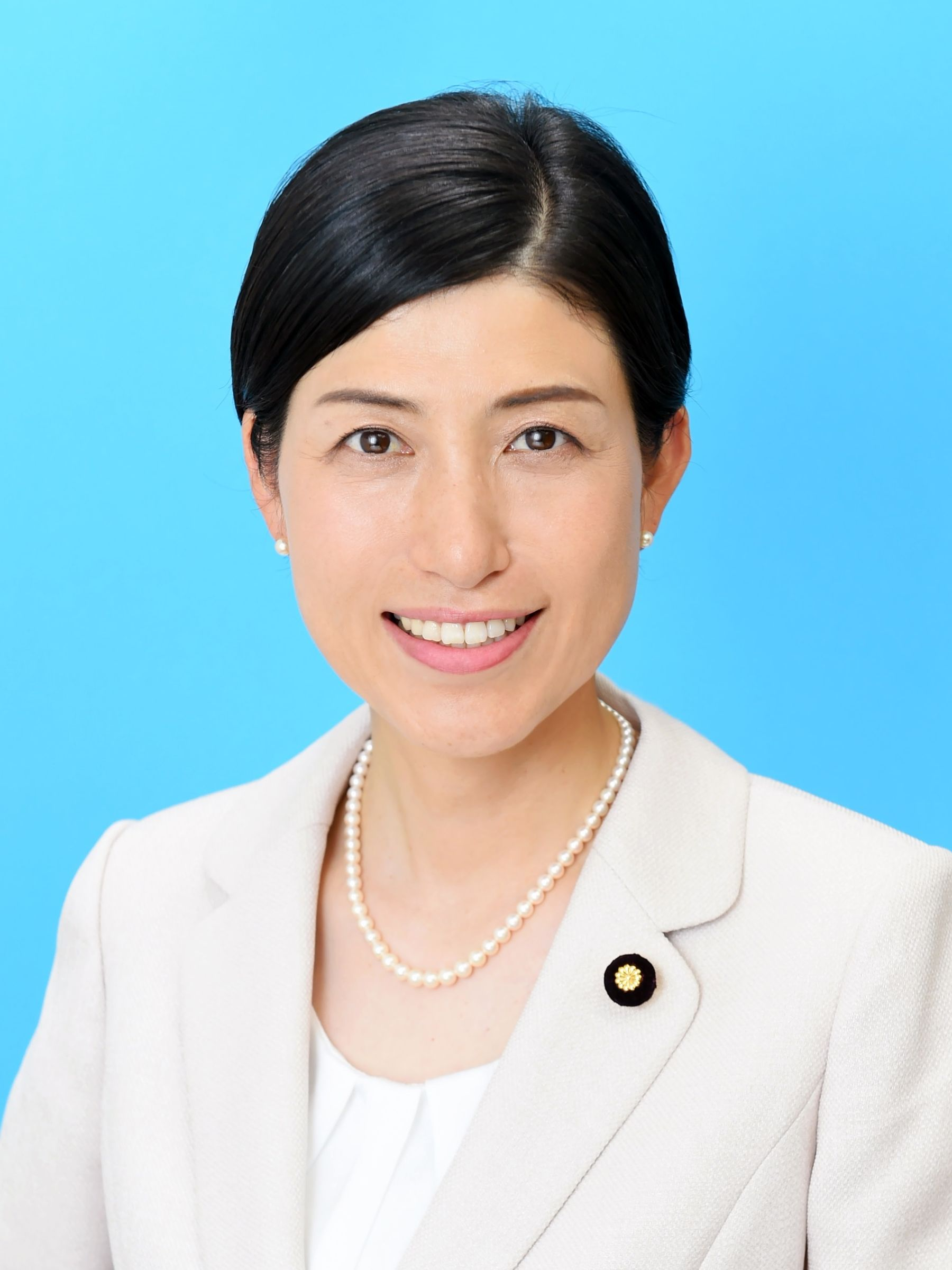
- Official portrait, 2019

Senator of Japan
- Incumbent
- Assumed office 29 July 2019
- Constituency: National PR

Personal details
- Born: 29 September 1971 (age 55) Kumamoto, Japan
- Party: Liberal Democratic
- Other political affiliations: Your Party
- Parent: Ryoichi Honda (father)
- Education: Hoshi University

Akiko Honda is a Japanese politician who is a member of the Senate of Japan. She was elected in 2019 to the national proportional representation block.

== Career ==
She was born on 29 September 1971 in Kumamoto Prefecture and graduated from Hoshi University in 1996.
