= Hiroaki Nagasawa =

Japanese politician

- 長沢 広明
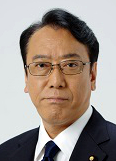
- Official portrait, 2017

Member of the House of Councillors
- In office 26 July 2010 – 26 September 2017
- Preceded by: Multi-member district
- Succeeded by: Shinji Takeuchi
- Constituency: National PR

Member of the House of Representatives
- In office 9 November 2003 – 8 August 2005
- Constituency: Northern Kanto PR

Personal details
- Born: 19 August 1958 (age 68) Tokyo, Japan
- Party: Komeito
- Education: Toyo University

Hiroaki Nagasawa (長沢 広明, Nagasawa Hiroaki; born 19 August 1958) is a Japanese politician and member of the Komeito Party of Japan and former Senior Vice Minister for the Reconstruction Agency. He resigned in September 2017 after letting a female acquaintance use a housing complex reserved for lawmakers.

== Early life ==
Nagasawa was born on 19 August 1958, in Tokyo, and studied sociology at Toyo University.

== Political career ==
In 1983, Nagasawa joined the Komei Shimbun, which was the official newspaper of the Komeito. He was first elected to the House of Representatives in 2003.

Nagasawa served in the House of Councillors from 2010 to 2017, having been re-elected in July 2016. Following his resignation, he was replaced as Senior Vice Minister by Masayoshi Hamada.
