= Hiroshi Yamamoto (politician) =

Japanese politician

- 山本 博司
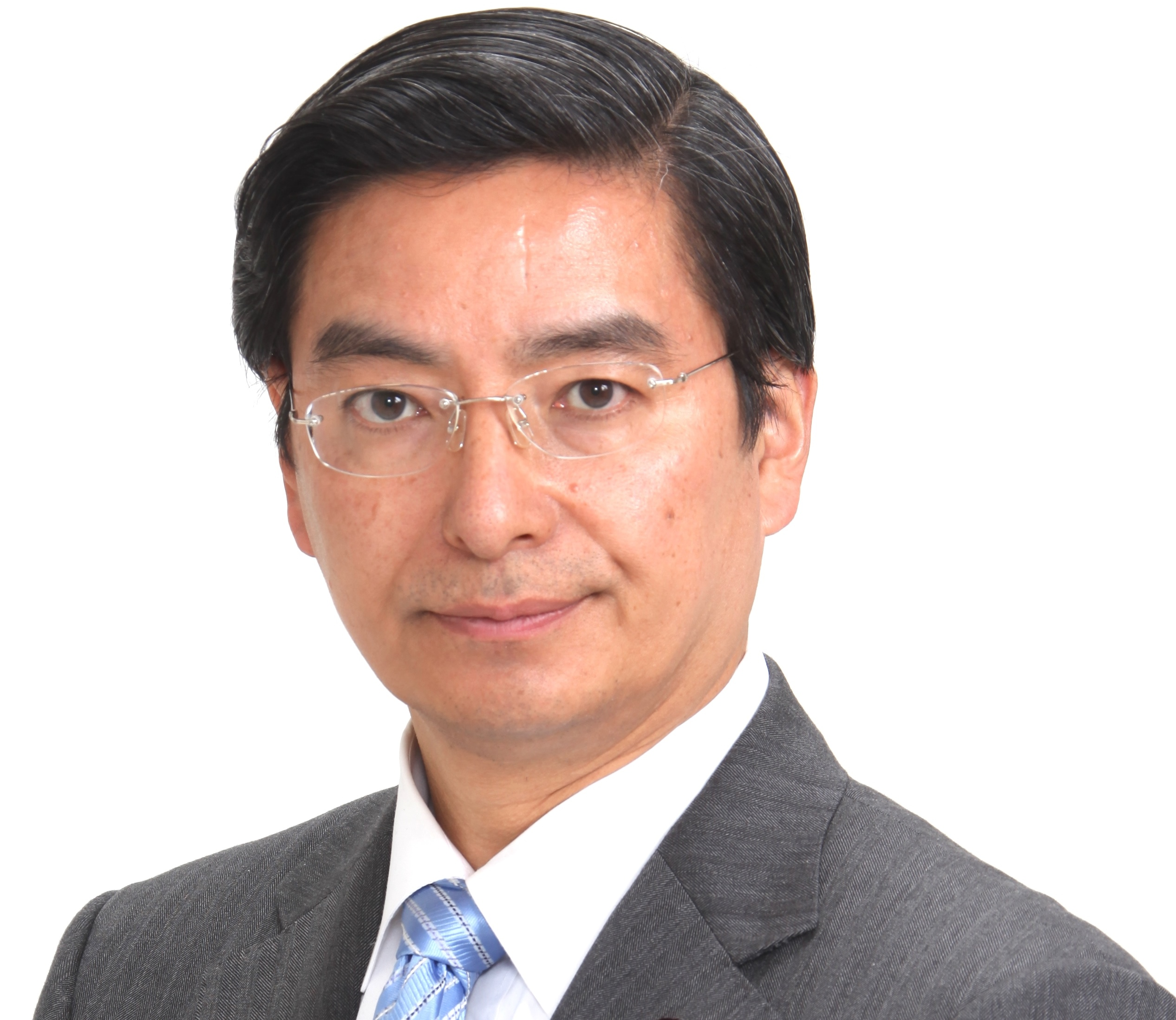
- Official portrait, 2013

Member of the House of Councillors
- In office 29 July 2007 – 28 July 2025
- Constituency: National PR

Personal details
- Born: 9 December 1954 (age 71) Yawatahama, Ehime, Japan
- Party: Komeito
- Education: Keio University

Hiroshi Yamamoto (山本 博司, Yamamoto Hiroshi; born 1954) is a Japanese politician of the New Komeito Party, a former member of the House of Councillors in the Diet (national legislature). A native of Yawatahama, Ehime and graduate of Keio University, he was elected to the House of Councillors for the first time in 2007 after working at IBM.
