= Yoshifumi Tsuge =

- 柘植 芳文
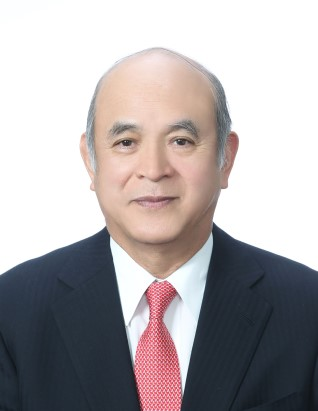
- Official portrait, 2022

Member of the House of Councillors
- In office 29 July 2013 – 28 July 2025
- Constituency: National PR

Personal details
- Born: 11 October 1945 (age 80) Ena, Gifu, Japan
- Party: Liberal Democratic
- Education: Aichi University

Yoshifumi Tsuge (柘植 芳文, Tsuge Yoshifumi) is a Japanese politician who is a former member of the House of Councillors of Japan.

== Biography ==
He graduated from Aichi University and later worked as a postmaster. He later was elected to the House of Councillors and worked in the Ministry of Defense.
