= Yoshihiro Kawano =

Japanese politician

- 河野 義博
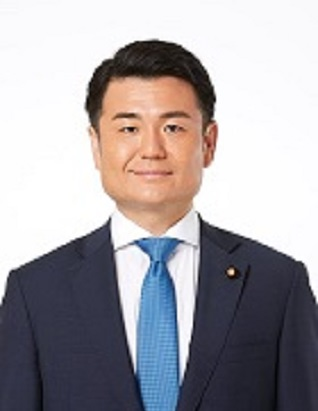
- Official portrait, 2019

Member of the House of Representatives
- Incumbent
- Assumed office 9 February 2026
- Preceded by: Multi-member district
- Constituency: Kyushu PR

Member of the House of Councillors
- In office 29 July 2013 – 28 July 2025
- Constituency: National PR

Personal details
- Born: 1 December 1977 (age 48) Fukuoka, Japan
- Party: Komeito (until 2026; since 2026)
- Other political affiliations: CRA (2026)
- Education: Keio University
- Website: Official website

Yoshihiro Kawano (河野義博, Kawano Yoshihiro; born 1 December 1977) is a Japanese politician with the Komeito political party. He served in the House of Councillors as a national proportional representative from 2013 to 2025.
