= Toshio Yamada =

Japanese politician

- 山田 俊男
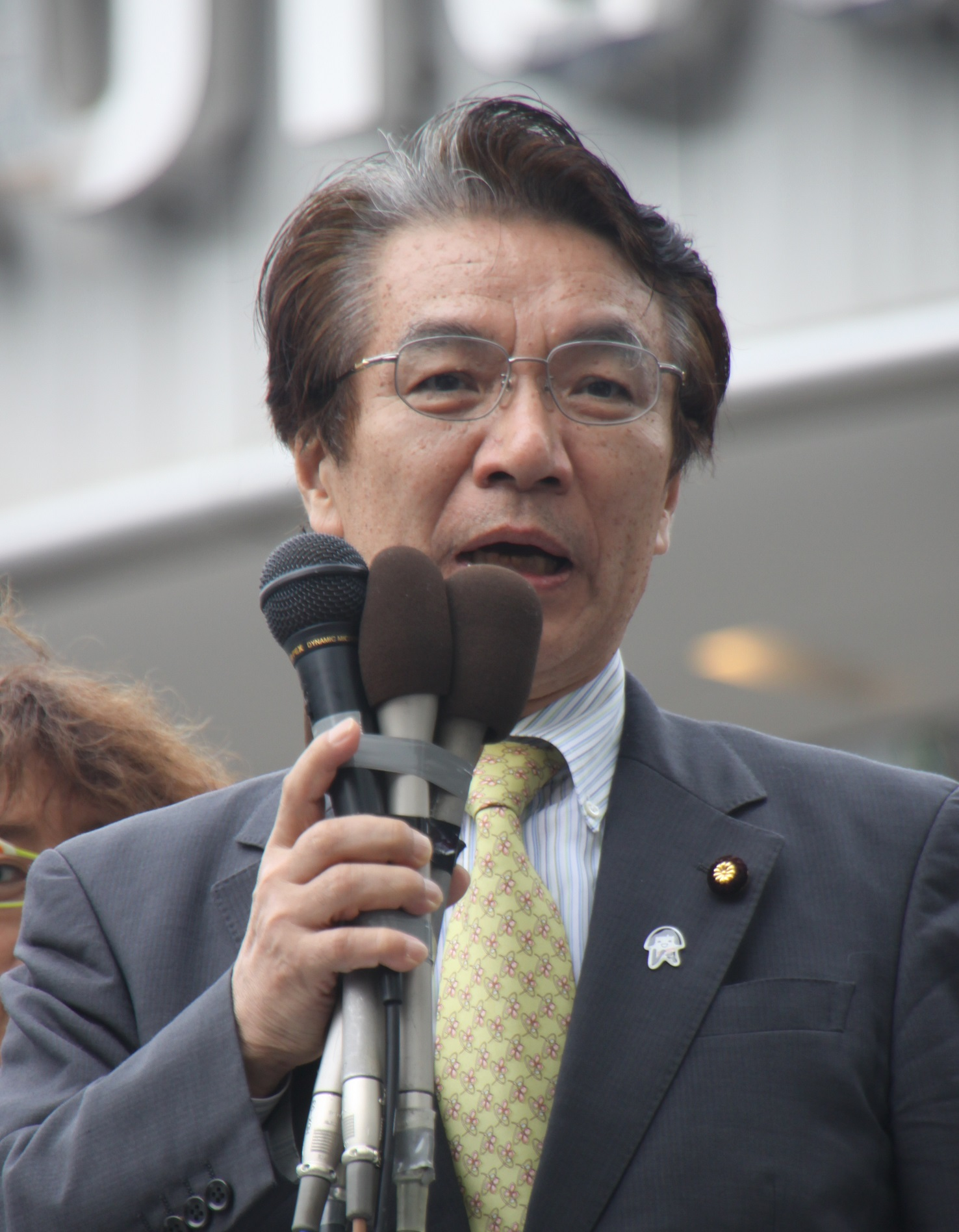
- Yamada in 2011

Member of the House of Councillors
- In office 29 July 2007 – 28 July 2025
- Preceded by: Hideki Azumano
- Constituency: National PR

Personal details
- Born: 29 November 1946 (age 79) Oyabe, Toyama, Japan
- Party: Liberal Democratic
- Education: Waseda University

Toshio Yamada (山田 俊男, Yamada Toshio; born November 29, 1946) is a Japanese politician of the Liberal Democratic Party, a former member of the House of Councillors in the Diet (national legislature).

== Career ==
A native of Oyabe, Toyama and a graduate of Waseda University, he was elected for the first time in 2007.
