= Saori Yoshikawa =

Japanese politician (born 1976)

- 吉川 沙織
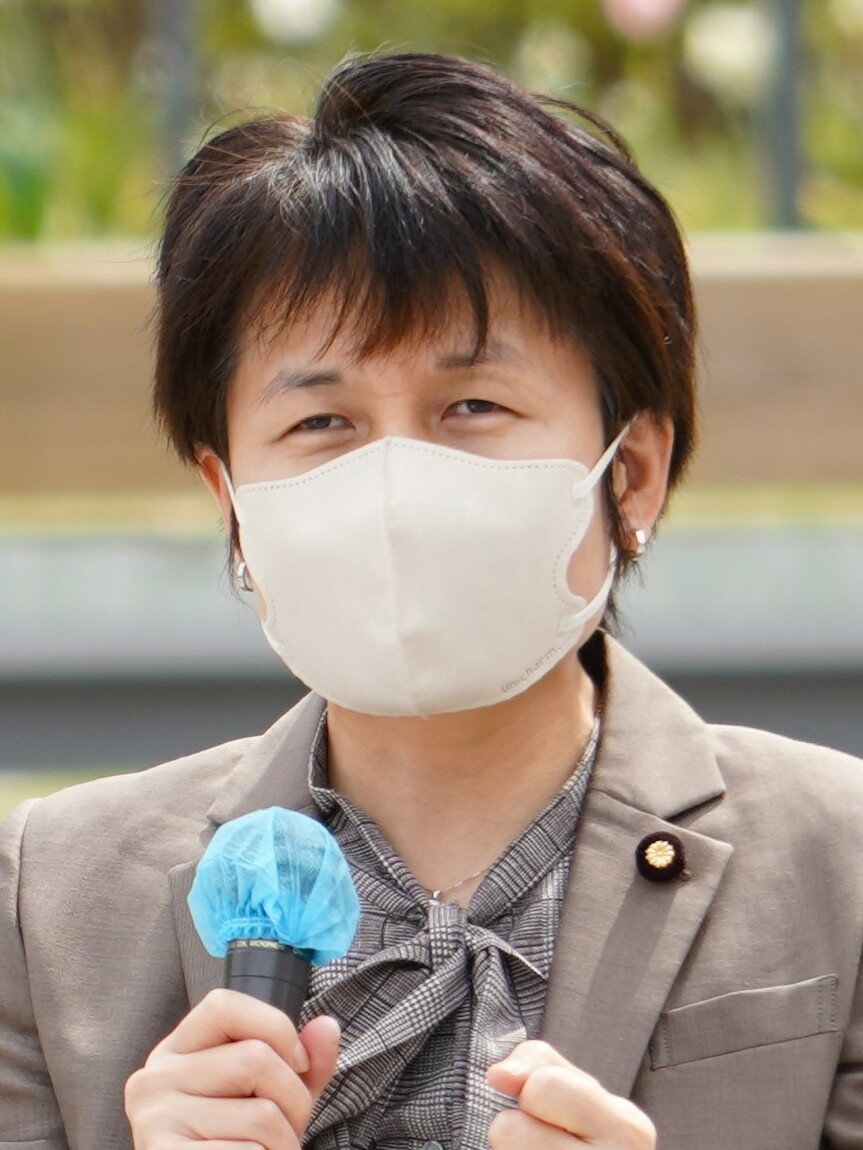
- Yoshikawa in 2023

Member of House of Councillors
- Incumbent
- Assumed office 29 July 2007
- Constituency: National PR

Personal details
- Born: 9 October 1976 (age 50) Tokushima City, Tokushima, Japan
- Party: CDP (since 2018)
- Other political affiliations: DPJ (2007–2016); DP (2016–2018)
- Education: Doshisha University
- Website: Official website

Saori Yoshikawa (吉川 沙織, Yoshikawa Saori; born 9 October 1976) is a Japanese politician of the Constitutional Democratic Party and a member of the House of Councillors in the Diet (national legislature).

== Early life ==
Yoshikawa is a native of Tokushima Prefecture, she graduated from Doshisha University in 1999. She joined NTT upon graduation. She also studied at the graduate school of Doshisha University from 2001 until 2003 while still in the company.

== Political career ==
Leaving the company in July 2006, Yoshikawa was elected to the House of Councillors for the first time in 2007. She has been reelected twice, most recently in 2019, and is still serving in the House of Councillors as of early 2025.
