= Seishi Kumano =

Japanese politician (born 1965)

- 熊野 正士
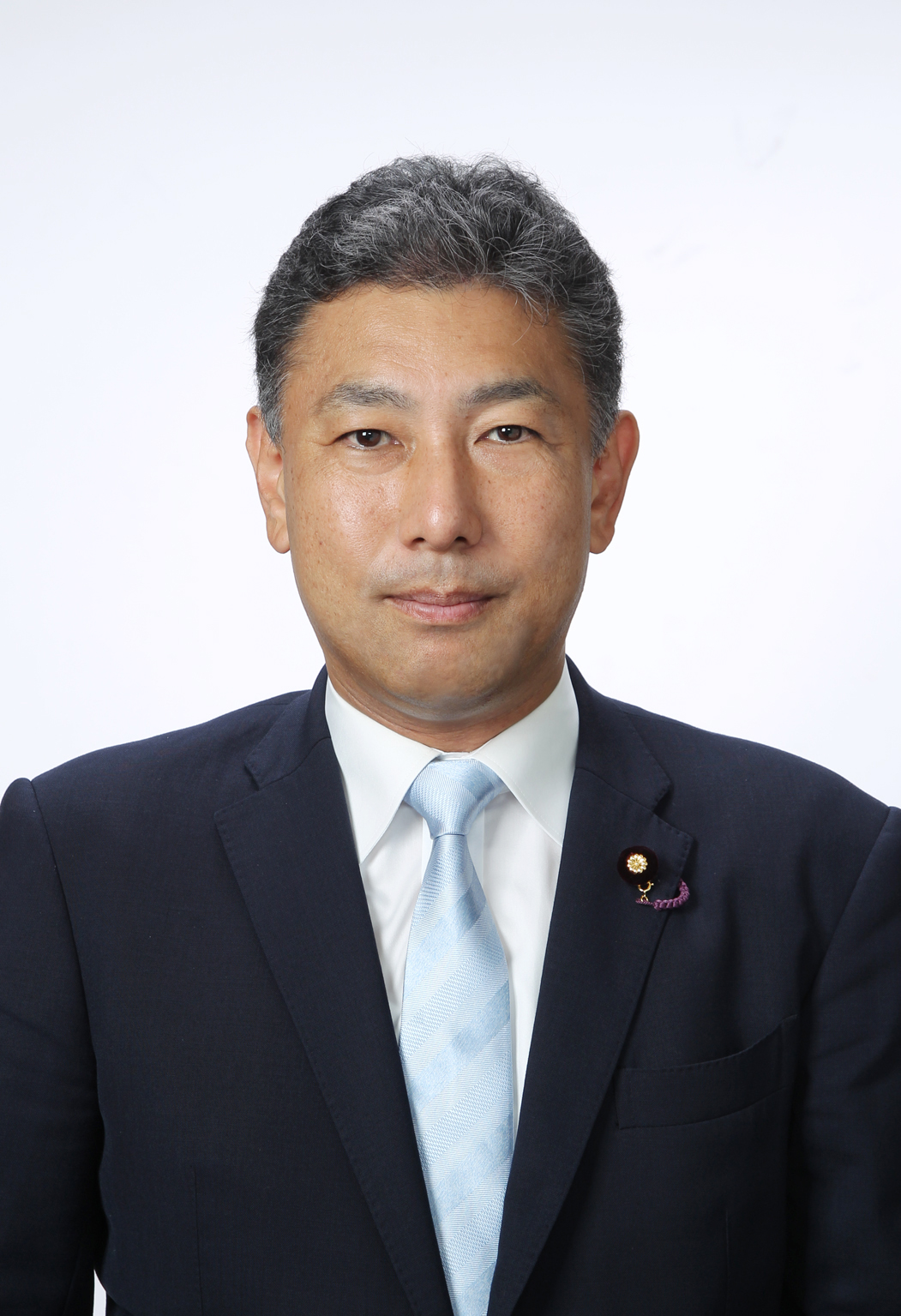
- Official portrait, 2020

Member of the House of Councillors
- In office 26 July 2016 – 30 September 2022
- Preceded by: Multi-member district
- Succeeded by: Masaru Miyazaki
- Constituency: National PR

Personal details
- Born: 19 April 1965 (age 61) Himeji, Hyōgo, Japan
- Party: Komeito
- Education: Ehime University
- Occupation: Radiologist, Politician

Seishi Kumano is a Japanese politician who was a member of the House of Councillors of Japan.

== Career ==
He was elected in 2016.

He resigned in September 2022, after facing sexual harassment allegations.
