= Masao Miyazaki =

Japanese politician (born 1963)

- 宮崎 雅夫
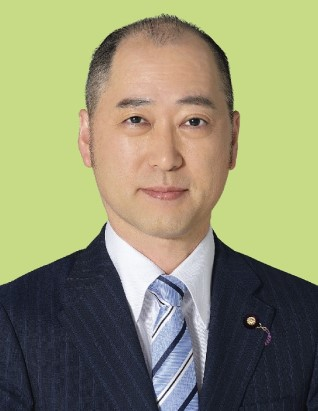
- Official portrait, 2019

Member of the House of Councillors
- In office 29 July 2019 – 28 July 2025
- Constituency: National PR

Personal details
- Born: 3 December 1963 (age 62) Kita-ku, Kobe, Japan
- Party: Liberal Democratic
- Education: Kobe University

Masao Miyazaki is a Japanese politician who is a former member of the House of Councillors of Japan.

== Career ==
He graduated from Kobe University, Faculty of Agriculture and worked in the Ministry of Agriculture in 1987.
