= Takashi Uto =

Japanese politician

- 宇都 隆史
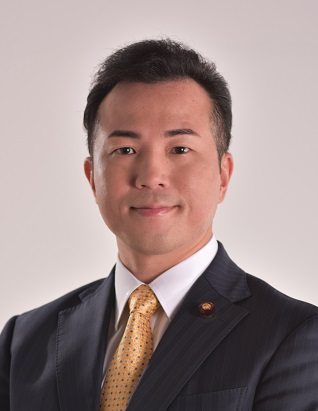
- Official portrait, 2020

Member of the House of Councillors
- In office 26 July 2010 – 25 July 2022
- Constituency: National PR

Personal details
- Born: 12 November 1974 (age 51) Kagoshima, Japan
- Party: Sanseitō
- Other political affiliations: Liberal Democratic (a. 2025)
- Education: National Defense Academy

Military service
- Allegiance: Japan
- Branch/service: Japan Air Self-Defense Force
- Years of service: 1998–2007
- Rank: Captain

Takashi Uto (born 10 November 1974) is a Japanese politician who served as a member of the House of Councillors from 2010 to 2022. He represented the National proportional representation block and was a member of the Liberal Democratic Party.

He was a member of the following committees as of 2021:

- Committee on Foreign Affairs and Defense
- Committee on Fundamental National Policies

He left the LDP in December 2025 and joined Sanseitō.
