= Masahiro Ishida =

Japanese politician

- 石田 昌宏
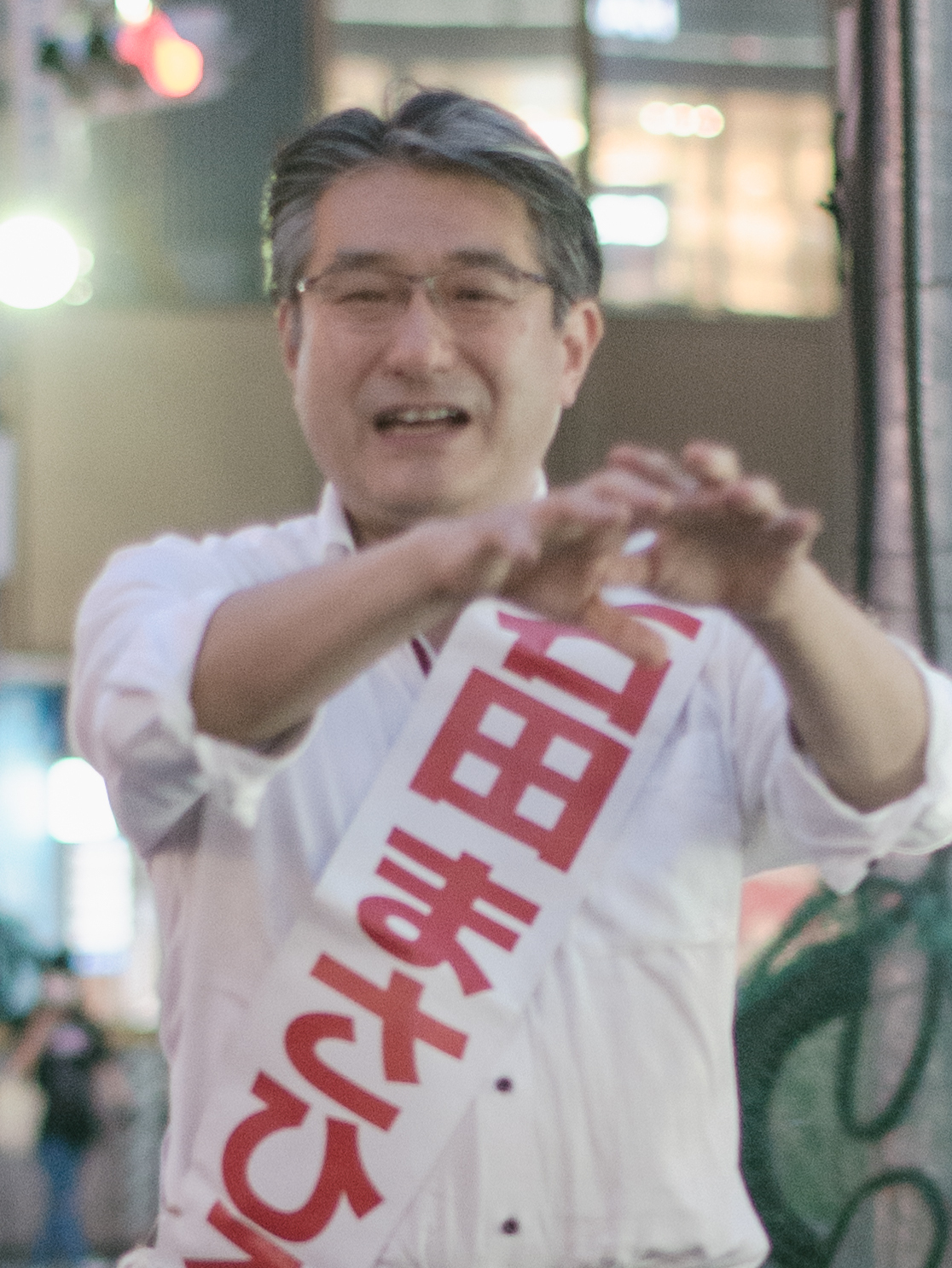
- Ishida in 2019

Member of the House of Councillors
- Incumbent
- Assumed office 29 July 2013
- Constituency: National PR

Personal details
- Born: 20 May 1967 (age 59) Yamatokōriyama, Nara, Japan
- Party: Liberal Democratic
- Education: University of Tokyo

Masahiro Ishida (born May 20, 1967, in Nara Prefecture, Japan) is a Japanese politician who has served as a member of the House of Councillors of Japan since 2013. He represents the National proportional representation block and is a member of the Liberal Democratic Party.
