= Hiroaki Shiota =

- 塩田 博昭
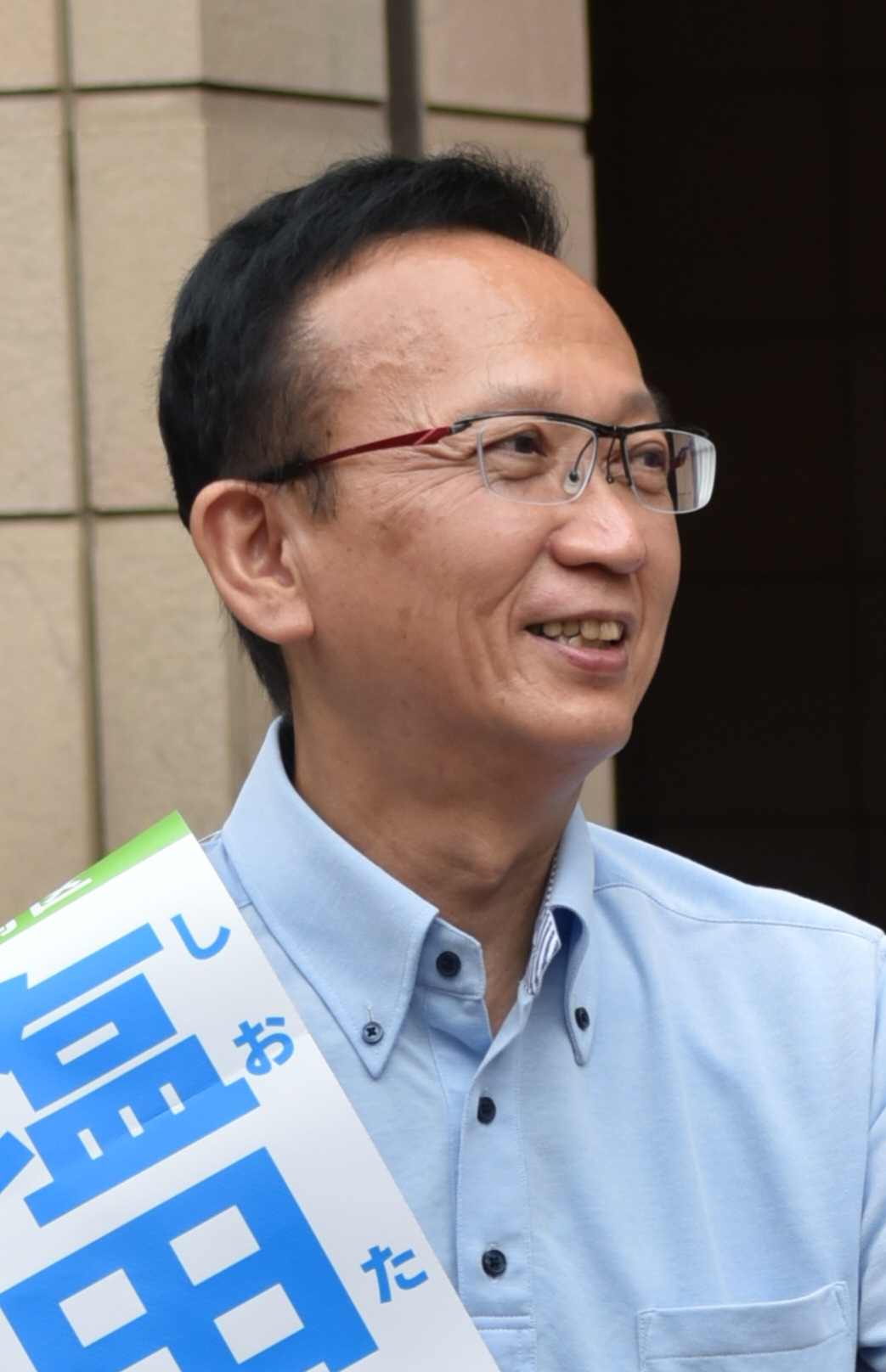

Member of the House of Councillors
- In office 29 July 2019 – 28 July 2025
- Constituency: National PR

Personal details
- Born: 19 January 1962 (age 64) Awa, Tokushima, Japan
- Party: Komeito
- Education: Akita University

Hiroaki Shiota is a Japanese politician who is a former member of the House of Councillors of Japan.

== Career ==
He graduated in 1984 from Akita University and has worked for Komei Shimbun. He holds several patents.
