= Satoshi Nakanishi =

Japanese politician

- 中西 哲
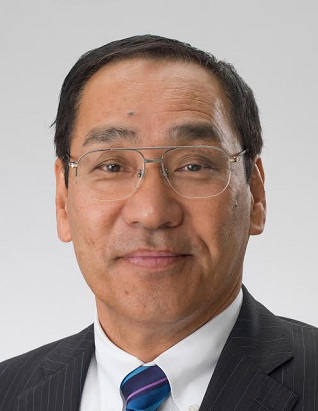
- Official portrait, 2020

Member of the House of Councillors
- In office 26 July 2016 – 25 July 2022
- Constituency: National PR

Member of the Kōchi Prefectural Assembly
- In office 11 April 1999 – 12 April 2015
- Constituency: Sukumo City; Ōtsuki Town; Mihara Village

Member of the Sukumo City Council
- In office 11 April 1995 – 12 April 1999

Personal details
- Born: 7 December 1951 (age 74) Sukumo, Kōchi, Japan
- Party: Liberal Democratic
- Education: Chuo University

Satoshi Nakanishi is a Japanese politician who is a member of the House of Councillors of Japan.

== Biography ==
He graduated in 1975 from Chuo University, Faculty of Law, Department of Political Science. He served one term from 2016 to 2022.
