= Midori Ishii =

Japanese politician

- 石井 みどり

Member of the House of Councillors
- In office 29 July 2007 – 28 July 2019
- Constituency: National PR

Personal details
- Born: 23 June 1949 (age 77) Hiroshima Prefecture, Japan
- Party: Liberal Democratic
- Education: Tsurumi University

Midori Ishii (石井 みどり, Ishii Midori; born June 23, 1949) is a Japanese politician of the Liberal Democratic Party, a member of the House of Councillors in the Diet (national legislature). A graduate of Tsurumi University, she was elected for the first time in 2007.
