= Shinkun Haku =

Korean Japanese politician (born 1958)

Haku Shinkun
- 白 眞勲
- Official portrait, 2012

Member of House of Councillors
- In office 26 July 2004 – 25 July 2022
- Constituency: National PR

Personal details
- Born: Baek Jin-hoon; 8 December 1958 (age 67) Shinjuku, Tokyo, Japan
- Party: CDP (since 2018)
- Other political affiliations: DPJ (2004–2016); DP (2016–2018)
- Education: Nihon University
- Website: Official website

Korean name
- Hangul: 백진훈
- Hanja: 白眞勳
- RR: Baek Jinhun
- MR: Paek Chinhun

Shinkun Haku (白 眞勲, Haku Shinkun; born 8 December 1958) is a Japanese politician of the Constitutional Democratic Party and a member of the House of Councillors in the Diet (national legislature).

== Early life ==
A native of Shinjuku, Tokyo, Haku was born to a South Korean father and Japanese mother. At the time of his birth, both South Korean nationality law and Japanese nationality law imputed nationality solely by patrilineal descent, and thus he had South Korean citizenship rather than Japanese citizenship at birth, with the legal name Baek Jinhoon (백진훈).

Haku graduate from Nihon University, and worked for the Chosun Ilbo, a South Korean newspaper, from 1985 to 2004, serving as its Tokyo bureau chief from 1994 onward.

In 2003, he renounced his South Korean citizenship to naturalise as a Japanese citizen.

He left the newspaper in 2004 to enter politics.

== Political career ==
Haiku was elected to the House of Councillors on his first attempt in 2004, and served on that body until 2021.

In 2012 he was named Senior Vice-Minister in the Cabinet Office under Prime Minister Yoshihiko Noda.

In the 2022 (Reiwa 4) ordinary election for the 26th House of Councillors, he ran as a candidate of the Constitutional Democratic Party from a proportional district. He received the 8th place out of 20 proportional candidates, falling short of the party's proportional 7 seats and losing the runner-up election.

== See also ==
- List of naturalized Japanese politicians
