= Shibata Takumi (politician) =

Japanese politician

- 柴田 巧

Member of the House of Councillors
- Incumbent
- Assumed office 29 July 2019
- Constituency: National PR
- In office 26 July 2010 – 25 July 2016
- Constituency: National PR

Member of the Toyama Prefectural Assembly
- In office 1999–2009
- Constituency: Oyabe City

Personal details
- Born: 11 December 1960 (age 65) Oyabe, Toyama, Japan
- Party: Innovation (since 2019)
- Other political affiliations: LDP (1999–2009); Independent (2009–2010; 2016–2017); Your Party (2010–2013); Unity (2013–2014); JIP (2014–2016); KnT (2017–2019)
- Education: Waseda University

Shibata Takumi (Japanese: 柴田巧, born December 11, 1960) is a Japanese politician who is serving as a member of the National Diet in the House of Councillors for Nippon Ishin no Kai as part of the Japanese House of Councillors national proportional representation block.

== Early life and education ==
Shibata was born December 11, 1960, in Toyama Prefecture. He earned his bachelor's degree in 1984 from Waseda University's School of Social Sciences. He continued at Waseda, earning his master's from the Graduate School of Political Science in 1987.

== Career ==
Starting in 1988, Shibata served as secretary to former PM Mori Yoshiro. In 1999, he was elected to the Toyama Prefectural Assembly and served for three consecutive terms as a member of the Liberal Democratic Party (LDP). He left the LDP in January 2009.

In 2010, he was first elected to the House of Councillors as a member of Nippon Ishin no Kai. He was most recently reelected in 2019.
