= Takashi Hanyūda =

Japanese politician (1948-2026)

- 羽生田 俊
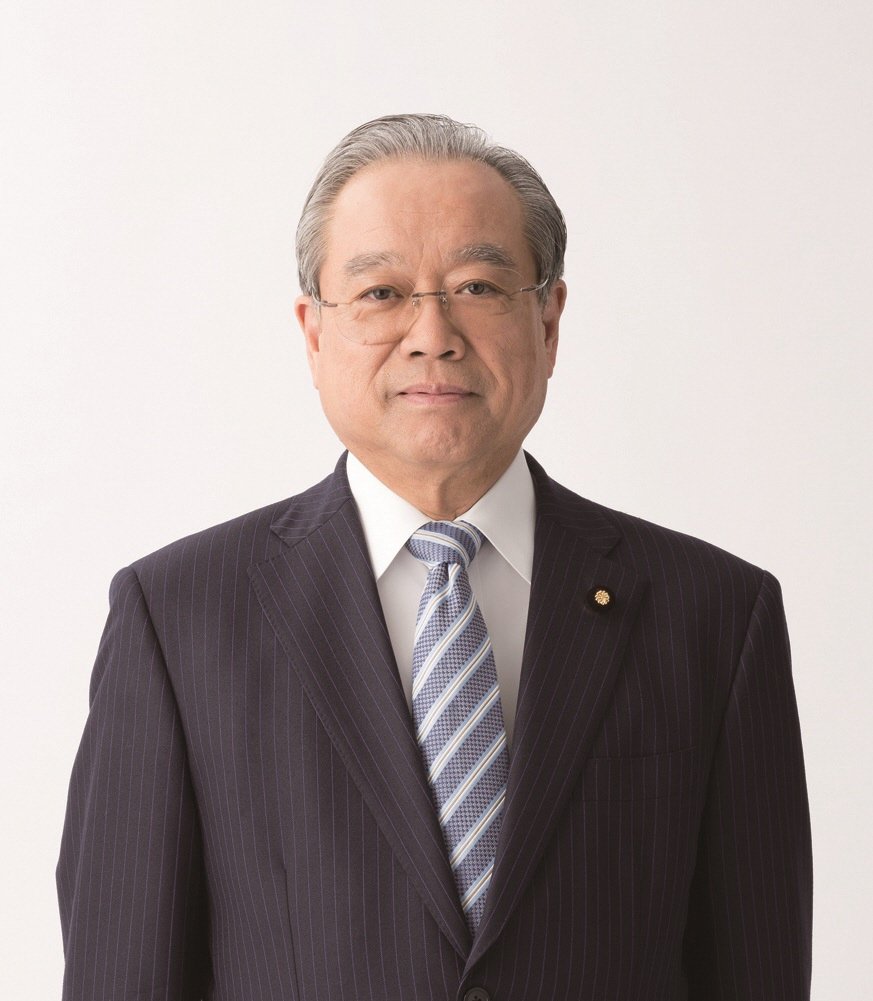
- Official portrait, 2022

Member of the House of Councillors
- In office 29 July 2013 – 28 July 2025
- Constituency: National PR

Personal details
- Born: 28 March 1948 Maebashi, Gunma Prefecture, Allied-occupied Japan
- Died: 25 August 2026 (aged 78)
- Party: Liberal Democratic
- Education: Tokyo Medical University
- Occupation: Doctor

Takashi Hanyūda (28 March 1948 – 25 August 2026) was a Japanese politician who was a member of the House of Councillors.

== Life and career ==
Hanyūda worked as a doctor before getting elected in 2013.

Hanyūda died on 25 August 2026, at the age of 78.
