= Masahito Ozawa =

Japanese politician (born 1965)

- 小沢 雅仁

Member of the House of Councillors
- Incumbent
- Assumed office 29 July 2019
- Constituency: National PR

Personal details
- Born: 13 August 1965 (age 60) Kōfu, Yamanashi, Japan
- Party: Constitutional Democratic

Masahito Ozawa (born August 13, 1965, in Yamanashi Prefecture, Japan) is a Japanese politician who has served as a member of the House of Councillors of Japan since 2019. He represents the National Proportional Representation Block as a member of the Constitutional Democratic Party.

Ozawa graduated high school in 1984 and worked as a postal worker. He participated in the formation of a postal workers' union and served as its deputy chairperson.

As of 2023, he is a member of the following committees:

- Committee on General Affairs (which he directs)
- Committee on Oversight
- Special Committee on Consumer Affairs
