= Nobuaki Sato =

Japanese politician

- 佐藤 信秋
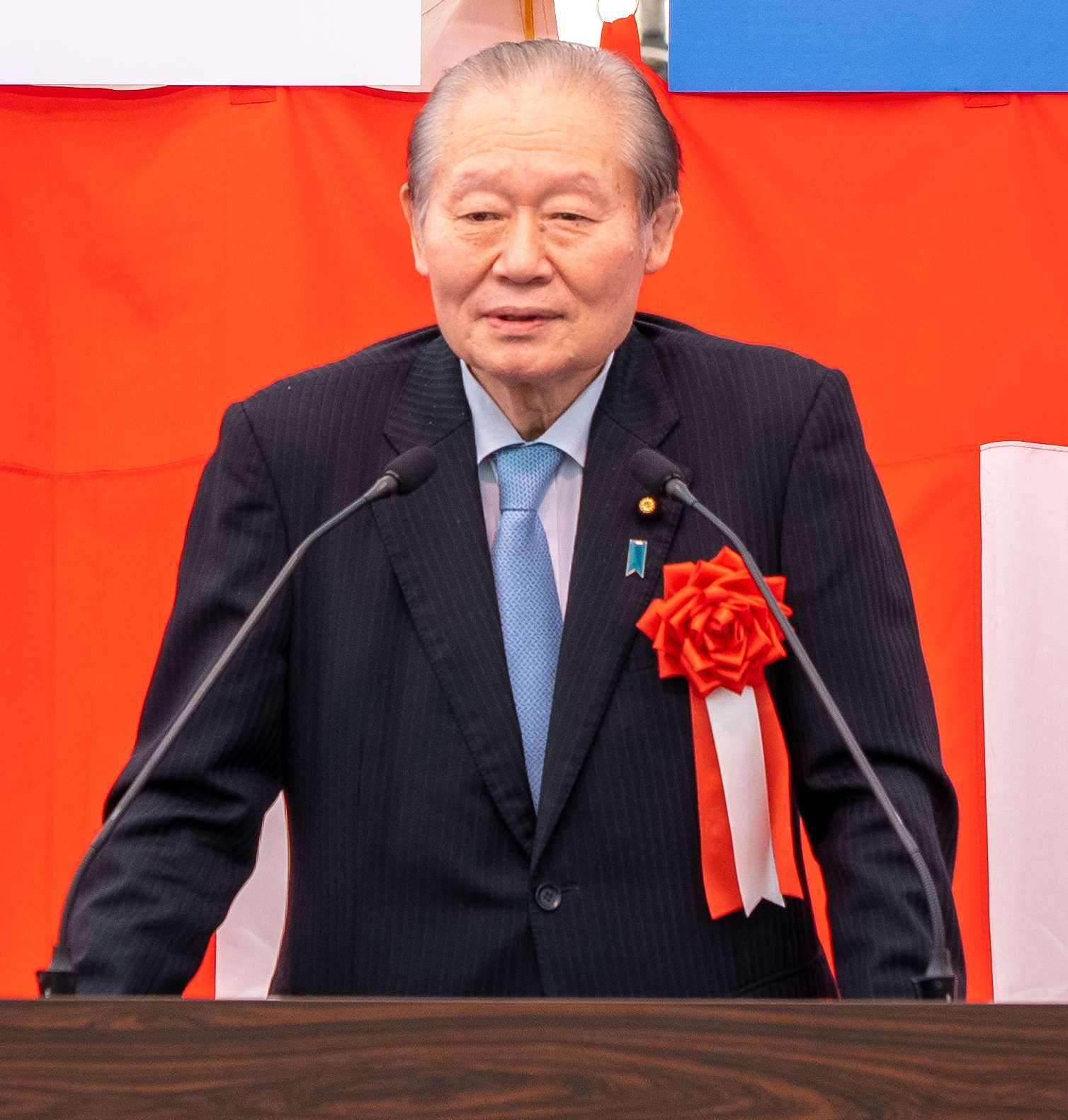
- Sato in 2022

Member of the House of Councillors
- In office 29 July 2007 – 28 July 2025
- Constituency: National PR

Personal details
- Born: 8 November 1947 (age 78) Niigata, Japan
- Party: Liberal Democratic
- Education: Kyoto University

Nobuaki Sato (佐藤 信秋, Satō Nobuaki; born November 8, 1947) is a Japanese politician of the Liberal Democratic Party, a former member of the House of Councillors in the Diet (national legislature). A native of Niigata Prefecture, he attended Kyoto University and received a master's degree in engineering from it. After working at the Ministry of Land, Infrastructure and Transport, He was elected to the House of Councillors for the first time in 2007.
