= Masaru Miyazaki =

Japanese politician (born 1958)

- 宮崎 勝
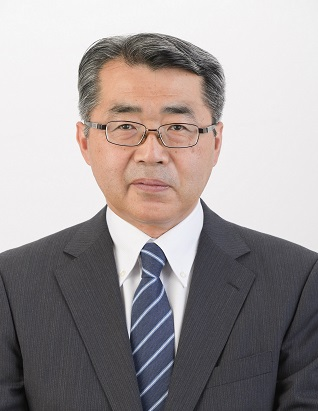
- Official portrait, 2020

Member of the House of Councillors
- Incumbent
- Assumed office 7 October 2022
- Preceded by: Seishi Kumano
- Constituency: National PR
- In office 26 July 2016 – 25 July 2022
- Constituency: National PR

Personal details
- Born: 18 March 1958 (age 68) Sakado, Saitama, Japan
- Party: Komeito
- Education: Saitama University

Masaru Miyazaki (born 18 March 1958) is a Japanese politician who is a member of the House of Councillors of Japan.

== Career ==
He graduated from engineering school and worked as an employee of Komei Shimbun.
