= Hideki Niizuma =

Japanese politician

- 新妻 秀規
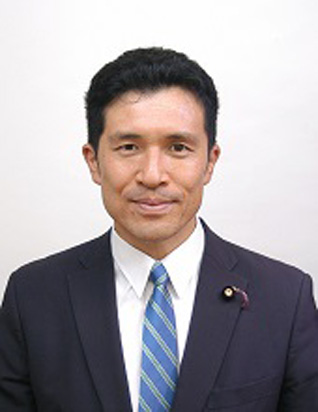
- Official portrait, 2017

Member of the House of Councillors
- In office 29 July 2013 – 28 July 2025
- Constituency: National PR

Personal details
- Born: 22 July 1970 (age 56) Koshigaya, Saitama, Japan
- Party: Komeito
- Education: University of Tokyo

Hideki Niizuma (新妻 秀規, Niizuma Hideki; born 22 July 1970) is a Japanese politician from Komeito who served as the State Minister for Reconstruction from 2013 until 2025.
