= Masahisa Sato =

Japanese politician

- 佐藤 正久
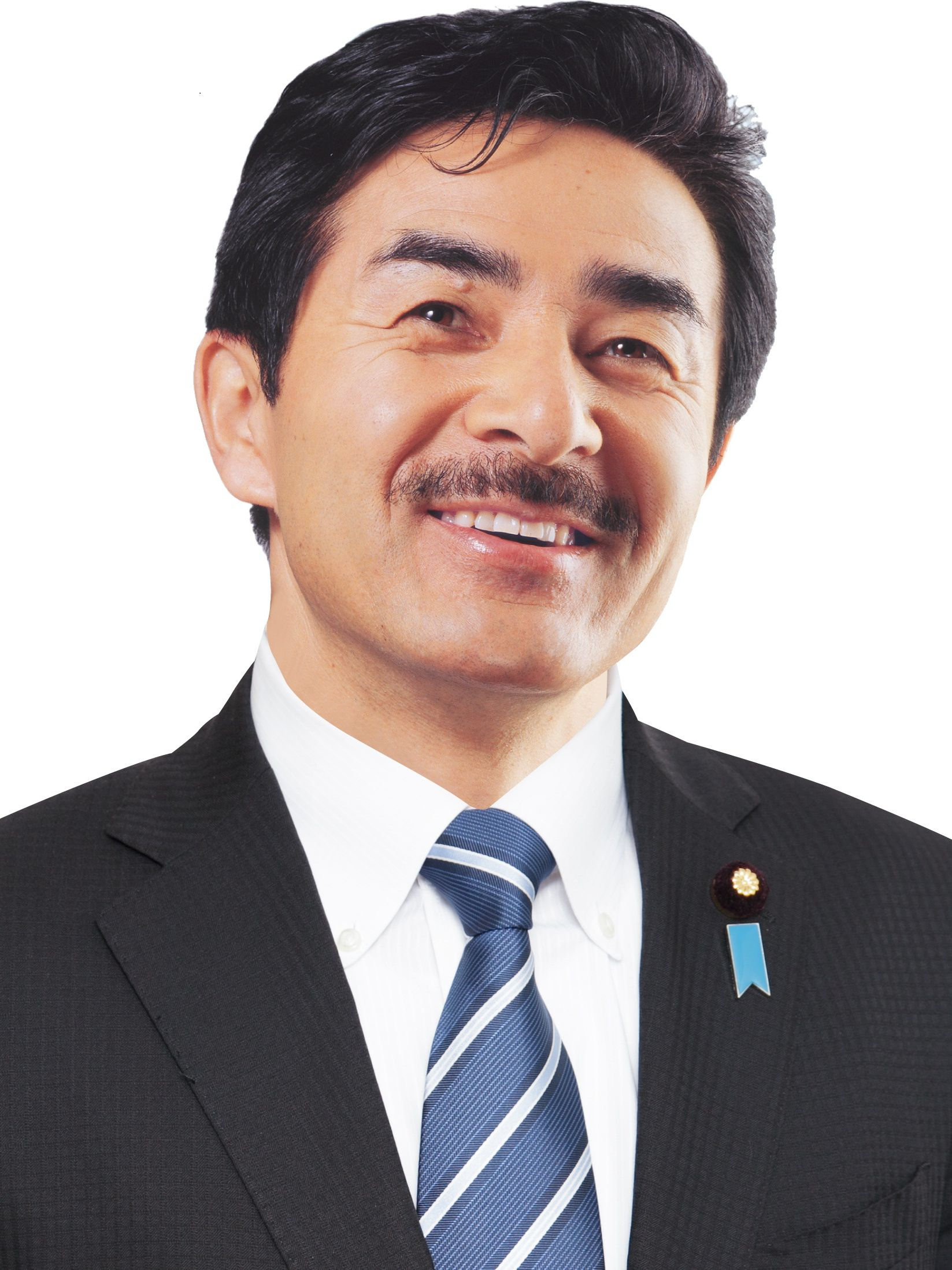
- Official portrait, 2013

Member of the House of Councillors
- In office 29 July 2007 – 28 July 2025
- Constituency: National PR

Personal details
- Born: 23 September 1960 (age 66) Fukushima Prefecture, Japan
- Party: Liberal Democratic
- Education: National Defense Academy of Japan; United States Army Command and General Staff College

Military service
- Allegiance: Japan
- Branch/service: Japan Ground Self-Defense Force
- Years of service: 1983–2007
- Rank: Colonel

Masahisa Sato (佐藤 正久, Satō Masahisa; born October 23, 1960) is a Japanese politician of the Liberal Democratic Party, a member of the House of Councillors in the Diet (national legislature). A native of Fukushima Prefecture, he graduated from National Defense Academy of Japan with a major in applied physics and joined the Japan Ground Self-Defense Force (JGSDF). In the JGSDF, he was the commander of the Japanese Iraq Reconstruction and Support Group. After his retirement as colonel in 2007, he was elected to the House of Councillors for the first time in 2007.
