= Daisaku Hiraki =

Japanese politician

- 平木 大作
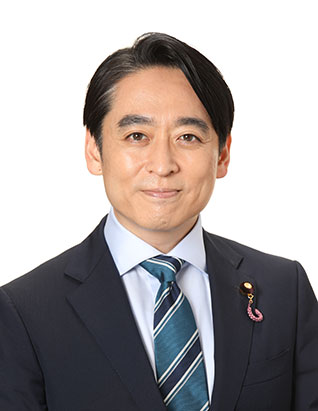
- Official portrait, 2023

Member of the House of Councillors
- Incumbent
- Assumed office 29 July 2013
- Constituency: National PR

Personal details
- Born: 16 October 1974 (age 51) Nagano City, Nagano, Japan
- Party: Komeito
- Education: University of Tokyo; IESE, University of Navarra

Daisaku Hiraki (平木 大作, Hiraki Daisaku; born October 16, 1974) is a Japanese politician. He is a member of the House of Councillors since 2013, representing the Komeito party.

== Career ==
Hiraki was born in Nagano and graduated from the law department of the University of Tokyo in 1998. He worked for Citibank for eight years after graduation, becoming a vice president in its legal department, then left the company to obtain an MBA from IESE Business School in Spain. In 2008, he joined Booz and Company as a management consultant.

He first ran for office in the 2013 House of Councillors election as a Komeito candidate for the national proportional representation district.

In August 2017, he was named Parliamentary Vice-Secretary for Economy, Trade and Industry, overseeing the Ministry of Economy, Trade and Industry. He concurrently serves as Parliamentary Vice-Minister of Cabinet Office and Parliamentary Vice-Minister for Reconstruction.

== Political positions ==
=== Constitutional revision ===
During his 2013 election campaign, Hiraki expressed opposition to amending Article 9 of the Japanese Constitution.

=== Participation in TPNW meeting ===
In March 2025, Hiraki participated in the third Meeting of States Parties to the Treaty on the Prohibition of Nuclear Weapons (TPNW) as the sole ruling party Diet member from Japan. Upon his return, Hiraki addressed the Diet, highlighting that the current leaders of the United States, Russia, and China -all key nuclear powers- had never visited Hiroshima or Nagasaki. He urged Prime Minister Shigeru Ishiba to encourage these leaders to visit Hiroshima and Nagasaki. Additionally, Hiraki appealed to him that he, as the leader of a nation that experienced wartime atomic bombings, should engage in summit diplomacy to foster trust and bridge the gap between nuclear-weapon states and non-nuclear-weapon states. In response, Ishiba stated, "I believe you have broadened your knowledge considerably [at the TPNW meeting]. I would very much like to hear your insights."
