= Tetsuji Isozaki =

Japanese politician

- 礒﨑 哲史
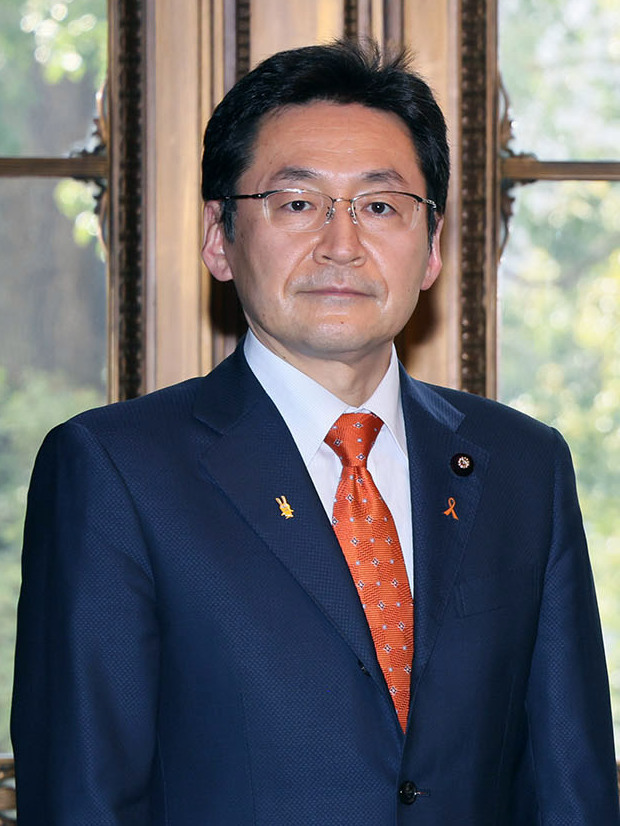
- Isozaki in 2023

Member of the House of Councillors
- Incumbent
- Assumed office 29 July 2013
- Constituency: National PR

Personal details
- Born: 7 April 1969 (age 57) Setagaya, Tokyo, Japan
- Party: DPP (2018–2020; 2021–present)
- Other political affiliations: DPJ (2013–2016); DP (2016–2018); Independent (2020–2021)
- Education: Tokyo Denki University

Tetsuji Isozaki (born April 7, 1969 in Tokyo) is a Japanese politician who has served as a member of the House of Councillors of Japan since 2013. He represents the National proportional representation block and is a member of the Democratic Party For the People.
