= Yoshifumi Hamano =

- 浜野 喜史
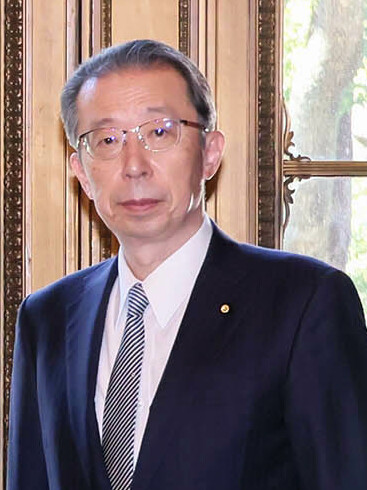
- Hamano in 2022

Member of the House of Councillors
- Incumbent
- Assumed office 29 July 2013
- Constituency: National PR

Personal details
- Born: 21 December 1960 (age 65) Takasago, Hyōgo, Japan
- Party: DPP (since 2018)
- Other political affiliations: DPJ (2013–2016); DP (2016–2018)
- Education: Kobe University

Yoshifumi Hamano is a Japanese politician who is a member of the House of Councillors of Japan.

== Biography ==
He worked at The Kansai Electric Power Co., Inc. before was elected in 2013.
