= Takanori Kawai =

Japanese politician

- 川合 孝典
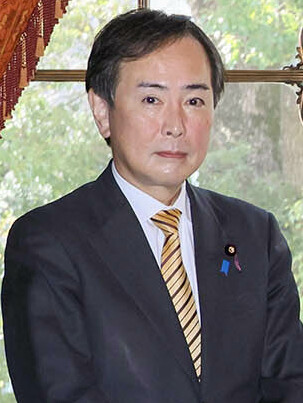
- Kawai in 2022

Member of the House of Councillors
- Incumbent
- Assumed office 26 July 2016
- Constituency: National PR
- In office 29 July 2007 – 28 July 2013
- Constituency: National PR

Personal details
- Born: 29 January 1964 (age 62) Kita-ku, Kyoto, Japan
- Party: DPP (since 2018)
- Other political affiliations: DPJ (2007–2016); DP (2016–2018)
- Education: Ritsumeikan University

Takanori Kawai (川合 孝典, Kawai Takanori; born January 29, 1964) is a Japanese politician of the Democratic Party of Japan, a member of the House of Councillors in the Diet (national legislature). A native of Kyoto, Kyoto and graduate of Ritsumeikan University, he was elected for the first time in 2007 after working at Teijin since 1987.
