= Makoto Hamaguchi =

Japanese politician

- 濱口 誠
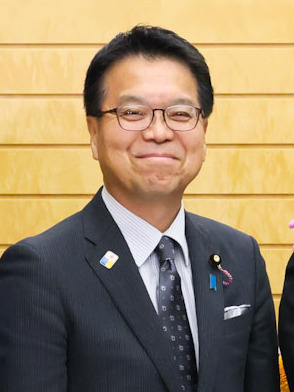
- Hamaguchi in 2024

Member of the House of Councillors
- Incumbent
- Assumed office 26 July 2016
- Constituency: National PR

Personal details
- Born: 18 May 1965 (age 61) Matsusaka, Mie, Japan
- Party: DPP (2018–2020; 2021–present)
- Other political affiliations: DPJ (2016); DP (2016–2018); Independent (2020–2021)
- Education: University of Tsukuba

Makoto Hamaguchi is a Japanese politician who is a member of the House of Councillors of Japan.

== Career ==
He was born on May 18, 1965, in Mie Prefecture. From 1988 to 2015, he worked for Toyota. He was elected in 2016, succeeding Masayuki Naoshima, and re-elected in 2022 as member of party list.
