= Masayoshi Hamada =

Japanese politician (born 1957)

- 浜田 昌良
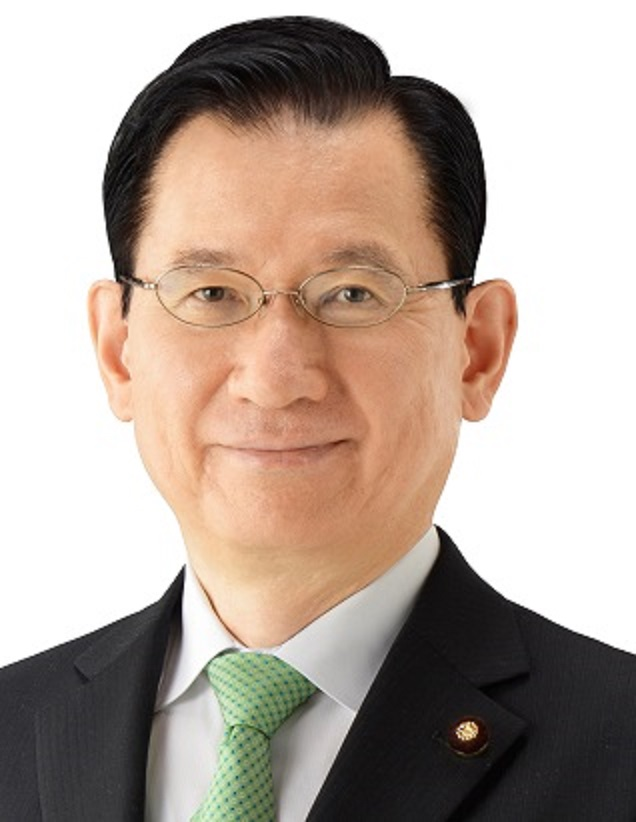
- Official portrait, 2015

Member of the House of Councillors
- In office 26 July 2004 – 25 July 2022
- Constituency: National PR

Personal details
- Born: 28 February 1957 (age 69) Tennōji, Osaka, Japan
- Party: Komeito
- Education: Kyoto University

Masayoshi Hamada (浜田 昌良, Hamada Masayoshi; born February 28, 1957 in Osaka) is a Japanese politician. He is a former representative in Diet and is a member of the New Komeito Party. In 1980 he left Kyoto University's graduate school mid-term to work in the Biochemical-Industry Division of Japan's Ministry of Economy, Trade and Industry (METI). He retired from METI in 2003 and in 2004 was elected to the Diet's Upper House. In 2006, he became the Ministry of Foreign Affairs's Parliamentary Secretary in the Shinzō Abe cabinet.

He earned his undergraduate degree from Kyoto University in 1979.
