= Kokumin Ikari no Koe =

Japanese proposed political organization

Kokumin Ikari no Koe (Japanese: 国民怒りの声, Angry Voice of the Citizens) is a Japanese political organization proposed in 2016, to be formed by Keio University professor and Constitutional scholar Setsu Kobayashi, a politically conservative constitutional law professor emeritus and former member of Nippon Kaigi, a far-right, nationalist, historical revisionist political group.

Nippon Kaigi aims at revising the Japanese Constitution to abolish its pacifist Article 9, and to do away with its provisions for human rights and freedom of speech. Kobayashi has criticized the members of Nippon Kaigi, which include Prime Minister Shinzō Abe and two thirds of Abe's cabinet, as "hav[ing] trouble accepting the reality that Japan lost the war"; he asserts the groups wants to return Japan to the militaristic Meiji Constitution (1890–1947), which declares the Emperor of Japan a literal deity and which makes women subservient to men. Kobayashi also draws attention to the fact that many members of Nippon Kaigi are descendants of those responsible for Japan's role in the Pacific War. Kobayashi, who was inspired by U.S. presidential candidate Bernie Sanders, formed the party to reverse the policies of Prime Minister Shinzō Abe. The party's name is based on the anger of both Kobayashi and the Japanese people at Japanese politics, not only at the heavy-handedness of the ruling coalition (Liberal Democratic Party (Japan) and Komeitō, but also disappointment at the opposition (Democratic Party, Japanese Communist Party and others).

The new party's policies were to include scrapping the security laws passed by the Abe cabinet, halting revision of the Japanese Constitution, restoring freedom of speech, and reducing the dependency of nuclear power.

Kobayashi was also to run for a seat in the Upper House election in July 2016.
