= Mami Tamura =

Japanese politician (born 1976)

- 田村 麻美
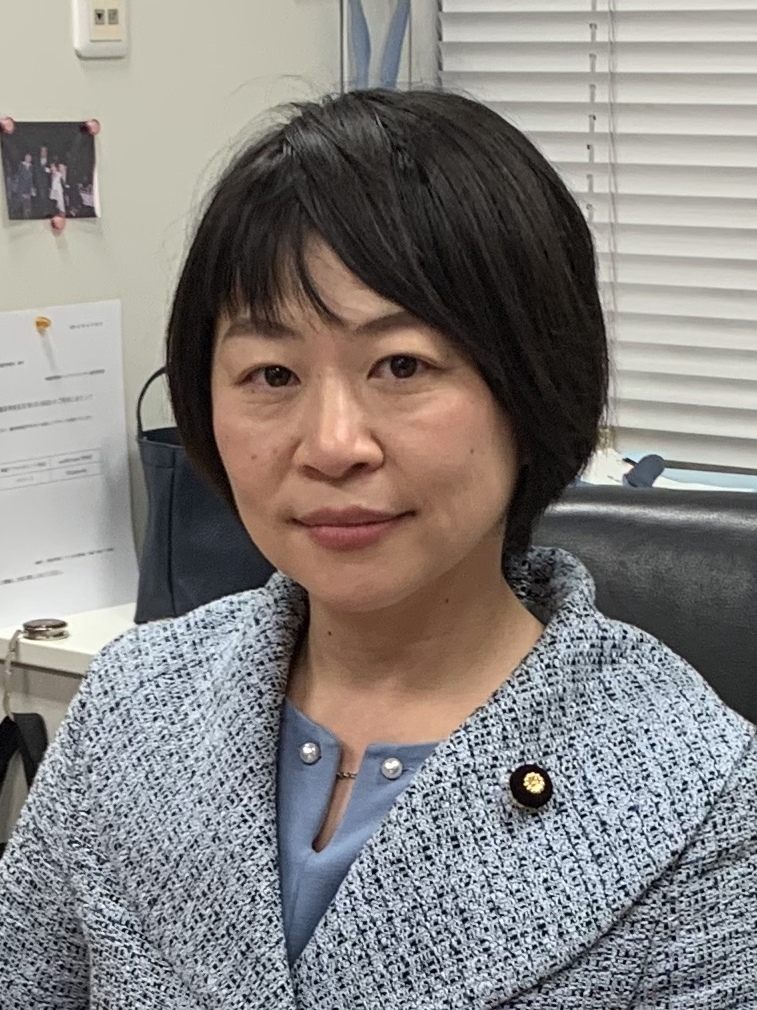
- Tamura in 2020

Member of the House of Councillors
- Incumbent
- Assumed office 29 July 2019
- Constituency: National PR

Personal details
- Born: 23 April 1976 (age 50) Itabashi, Tokyo, Japan
- Party: DPP (since 2018)
- Education: Doshisha University

Mami Tamura (たむら まみ, Tamura Mami; born 23 April 1976) is a Japanese politician who is a member of the House of Councillors of Japan.

== Career ==
She graduated from the Doshisha University, School of Theology before working in a labour union.
