= Hirofumi Yanagase =

- 柳ヶ瀬 裕文
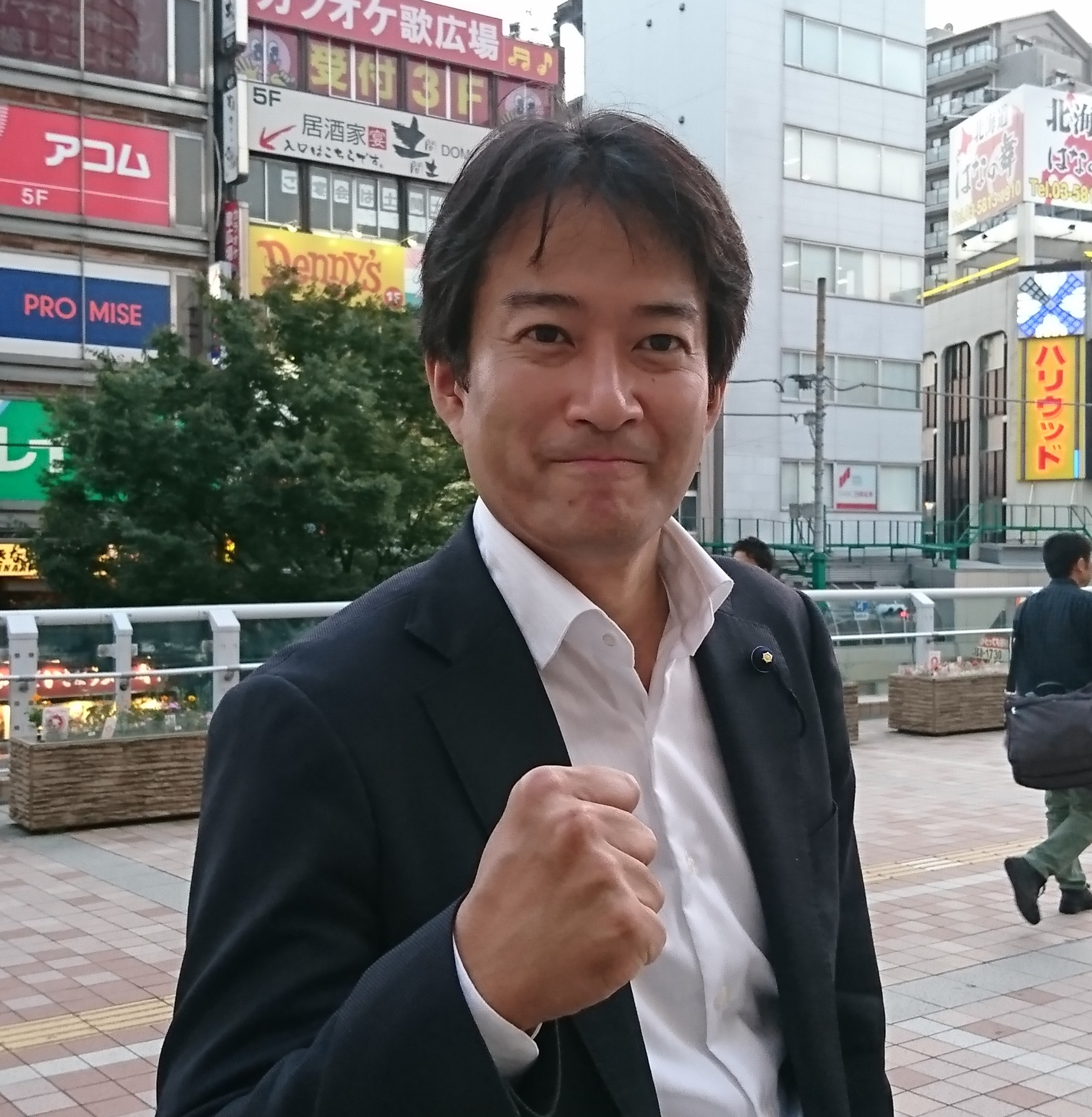
- Yanagase in 2017

Member of the House of Councillors
- In office 29 July 2019 – 28 July 2025
- Constituency: National PR

Member of the Tokyo Metropolitan Assembly
- In office 23 July 2009 – 11 June 2019
- Constituency: Ōta Ward

Member of the Ōta City Assembly
- In office 2007–2009

Personal details
- Born: 8 November 1974 (age 51) Ōta, Tokyo, Japan
- Party: Innovation (since 2015)
- Other political affiliations: Democratic (2007–2012); Restoration (2012–2014); Innovation (2014–2015)
- Education: Waseda University

Hirofumi Yanagase is a Japanese politician who is a former member of the House of Councillors of Japan. He was a representative member of the national proportional representation block.

== Career ==
In 1997, he graduated from Waseda University.

In 2004, he served as Official Secretary to Renho. In 2007, he was elected to the Ota City Assembly, and later in 2009 to the Tokyo Metropolitan Assembly. He was elected in 2019.
