= Hoshi University =

University in Japan

Coordinates: 35°36′N 139°44′E

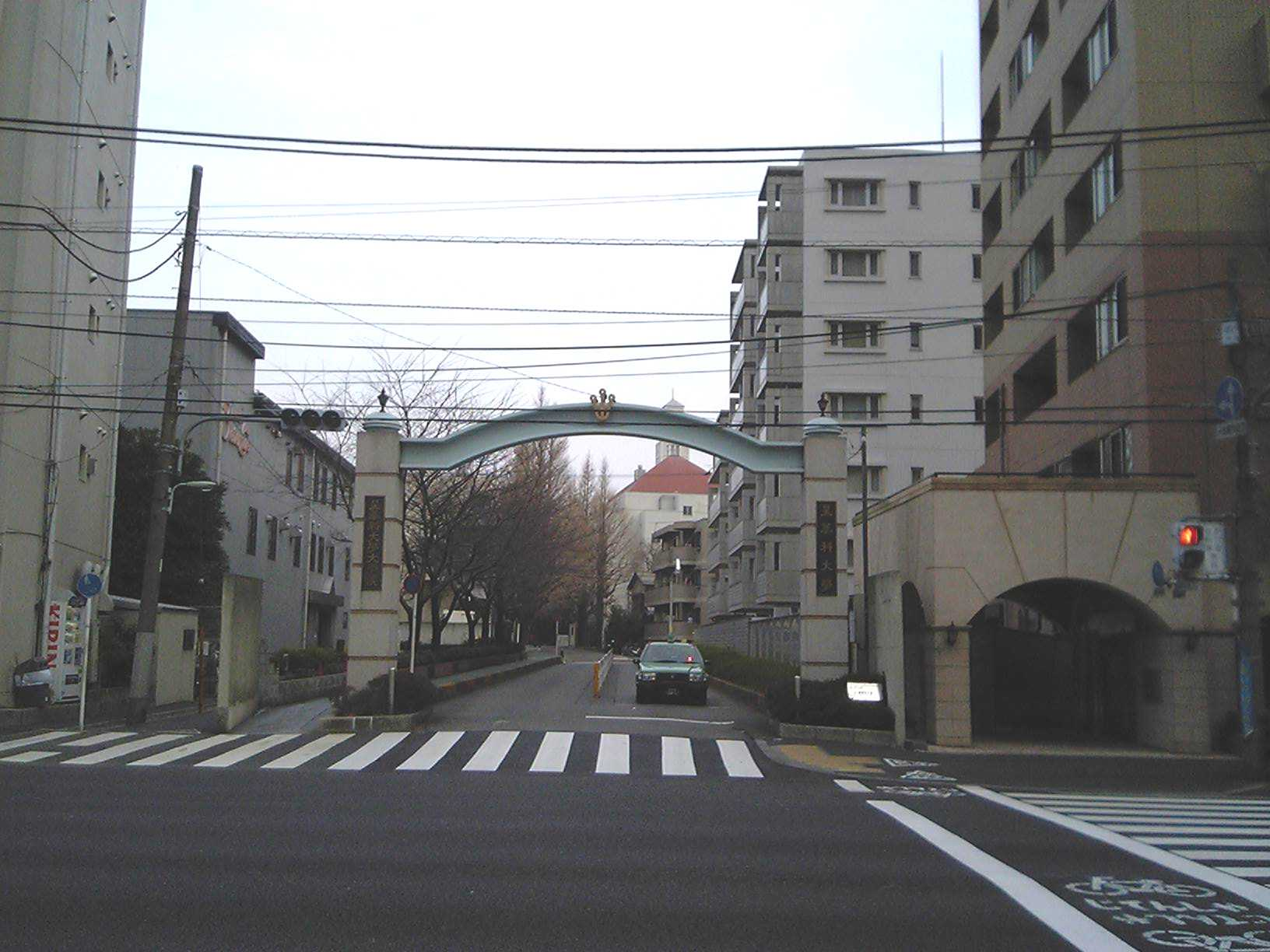
Hoshi University

Hoshi University (星薬科大学, Hoshi yakka daigaku) is a private university in Shinagawa, Tokyo, Japan, specializing in pharmaceutical sciences. The predecessor of the school was founded 1922. After becoming coeducational in 1946, it was chartered as a university in 1950.
