= Mitsuko Ishii =

Japanese politician (born 1954)

- 石井 苗子
- Official portrait, 2026

Member of the House of Councillors
- Incumbent
- Assumed office 26 July 2016
- Constituency: National PR

Personal details
- Born: 25 February 1954 (age 72) Taitō, Tokyo, Japan
- Party: Ishin
- Other political affiliations: One Osaka (formerly)
- Education: Sophia University; St. Luke's International University; University of Tokyo

Mitsuko Ishii (born 25 February 1954) is a Japanese politician who has served as a member of the House of Councillors of Japan since 2016. She represents the National proportional representation block and is a member of the Japan Innovation Party.
