= Democratic Party For the People =

Political party in Japan

Democratic Party For the People 国民民主党 Kokumin Minshu-tō
- Abbreviation: DPFP; DPP
- Leader: Yuichiro Tamaki
- Secretary-General: Kazuya Shimba
- Deputy Leader: Motohisa Furukawa
- Founded: 7 May 2018; 11 September 2020 (in current form)
- Merger of: Kibō no Tō; Democratic Party
- Merged into: Constitutional Democratic Party of Japan (majority)
- Headquarters: 1-11-1 Miyakezaka Building, Nagatachō, Chiyoda, Tokyo
- Newspaper: Kokumin Minshu Press
- Ideology: Conservatism; Populism
- Political position: Centre to centre-right
- Colors: Blue and gold
- Slogan: つくろう、新しい答え。 Tsukurou, atarashii kotae ('Let's make a new answer')
- Senators: 25 / 248
- Representatives: 28 / 465
- Prefectural assembly members: 34 / 2,614
- Municipal assembly members: 160 / 28,940

Website
- new-kokumin.jp

The Democratic Party For the People (国民民主党, Kokumin Minshu-tō), also translatable as "National Democratic Party," abbreviated to DPFP or DPP, is a political party in Japan, variously described as centrist, centre-right, conservative, and populist.

The first iteration of the party was formed on 7 May 2018 as a merger of the Democratic Party and Kibō no Tō (Party of Hope). In September 2020, some members of the party agreed to join the Constitutional Democratic Party of Japan; however, other members, including party leader Yuichiro Tamaki, rejected the arrangement and instead formed a new party retaining the DPFP name and branding. The party saw electoral success in the 2024 Japanese general election, in which it won 28 seats in the House of Representatives, becoming the fourth-largest party in the chamber. Subsequently in the 2025 Japanese House of Councillors election, the party came in second in the national popular vote and won 17 seats, surpassing Komeito to become the fourth-largest party in the National Diet overall. After the 2026 general election, the DPFP became the largest opposition party in the Diet, including seats across both chambers.

The party advocates for the use of expansionary fiscal policy. Politically, the party has never joined an LDP-Komeito ruling coalition, instead claiming cooperation with other parties, regardless of governing status, when policy aligns. For example, the party tried to reach an agreement with the LDP and Komeito on the national budget in 2024, while also signing cooperation agreements with the CDP and RENGO on policies such as diplomacy, economy, and diversity.

== History ==
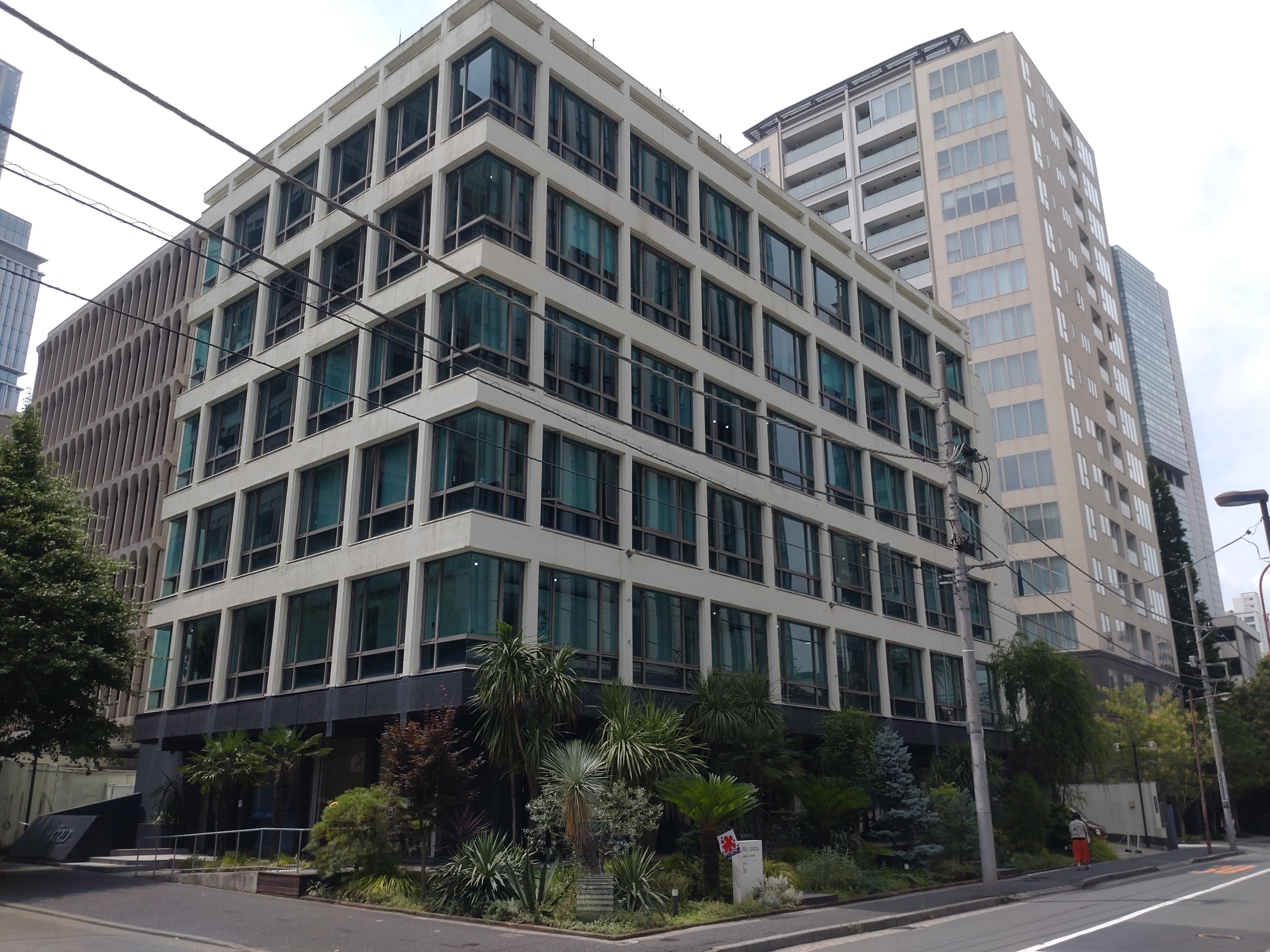
Building housing the party headquarters

=== First iteration ===
On 28 September 2017, Democratic Party (DP) leader Seiji Maehara announced that the party had abandoned plans to contest the 2017 Japanese general election, with the party's sitting representatives contesting the election as candidates for the Kibō no Tō recently founded by Tokyo governor Yuriko Koike, or as independents. On 23 October 2017, after the election, Maehara resigned as party president, with the Constitutional Democratic Party of Japan (CDPJ) having replaced the DP as the largest opposition party in the House of Representatives, while the existing DP caucus continued to exist in the House of Councillors.

In January 2018, the DP and the Kibō no Tō agreed to form a joint parliamentary group in both houses of the Diet, although days later the negotiations broke down. On 9 April 2018, it was announced that talks were ongoing to merge the two parties into a new opposition force. On 24 April 2018, at a joint press conference the leadership of the DP and the Kibō no Tō announced that both parties had agreed to merge in May 2018 as the National Democratic Party. The DP and Kibō no Tō on 7 May 2018, 62 members of the predecessor parties joined the DPFP at its formation, adopting Democratic Party For the People as their official English language title. DP leader Kōhei Ōtsuka and Kibō leader Yūichirō Tamaki became the interim co-leaders of the new party. The 2018 Democratic Party for the People leadership election was held to choose a permanent leader. Interim co-leader Tamaki was elected as the permanent leader of the party. In April 2019, the Liberal Party merged into the Democratic Party For the People.

=== Second iteration ===
In 2019, the Constitutional Democratic Party of Japan tried to absorb Democratic Party of People, but faced resistance from the party. Discussions resumed in year 2020, but due to split in opinion among members of the party at the time regarding whether to join CDPJ, it's announced on August 24 in the year both CDPJ and DPFP were dissolved and re-established as new CDPJ and DPFP, with only some of old DPFP members joining the new CDPJ. Difference in positions in policies have been cited as reason for why some members and supporting groups of DPFP did not join CDPJ at the time, including CDPJ's opposition of consumption tax cut, opposition to constitution amendment, push for zero nuclear, and that the CDPJ did not name itself as reformist-centrist.

As a result of this decision, the old DPFP dissolved on 11 September 2020 and the application for dissolution submitted to the government on 14 September 2020, and the new DPFP is subsequently established on 15 September 2020, retaining the DPFP name and branding. After the establishment of new DPFP, the new party decided not to join left-leaning opposition coalition which featured CDPJ, Japan Communist Party, Social Democratic Party, and Reiwa Shinsengumi, due to concern on the coalition's position regarding nuclear power, constitution reform, national security, and tax cut. Instead, the party cooperated with Japan Innovation Party for pushing constitutional reform and Tomin First no Kai in election.

In November 2023, Maehara Seiji and some other parliament members of the party left the party following defeat in party leadership election, criticising the executives of Democratic Party For the People at the time being too closely aligned with the Liberal Democratic Party (LDP), such as via the DPFP cooperating with the LDP on legislation and the DPFP intention to support the LDP's supplementary budget for the fiscal year 2024. Due to 2023–2024 Japanese slush fund scandal, the DPFP voted for support a vote of no confidence against the Kishida cabinet of the LDP-Komeito ruling coalition at the time. Because of this opposition, Komeito and the LDP removed policy supported by the DPFP from the supplementary budget. This caused DPFP disengage from discussion with LDP and Komeito, and the party instead moved to support candidates from the CDPJ in elections against the LDP/Komeito coalition. in the 2025 Japanese House of Councillors election, the party came in second in the national popular vote and won 17 seats, surpassing Komeito to become the fourth-largest party in the National Diet overall. In December 2025, DPFP reached an agreement for the implementation of its own flagship policies following extensive negotiations with the government. Stating that a "relationship of trust has been fostered with Prime Minister Sanae Takaichi", the party voted to approve the FY2026 budget proposal, even while maintaining its status as an opposition party.

== Political position and ideologies ==
=== First iteration ===
In 2018, the party was defined as centrist, while Freedom in the World 2019 rated it as centre-right. In 2018, Otsuka said that the term "Reformist-Centrist Party" describes the attitude and spirit of the DPP that thoroughly adheres to a democratic approach to realistically reform/solve various issues. In 2018, the DPFP officially stated its support of diplomatic pacifism, constitutionalism, and sustainable development.

=== Second iteration ===
The DPFP describes itself as a "reformist centrist", and not populist, although the party has also been described as conservative, as well as populist. The DPFP's political position is considered centrist, or centre-right. On the other hand, the party is sometimes considered as centrist-technocratic, right-wing populist, or centre-left. The party has never joined an LDP-led ruling coalition, instead claiming cooperation with other parties, regardless of governing status, when policy aligns. It has reached deals with the LDP while also signing cooperation agreements with the CDP and RENGO on policies such as diplomacy, economy, and diversity.

Key policies taken to the 2024 Japanese general election included supporting raising the tax-free threshold for income tax, and reducing premiums for social insurance. The DPFP also supports the reopening and new construction of nuclear power plants, as well as greater investment in defence spending and defence manufacturing. On immigration, the party campaigned on investigating social insurance coverage for foreign residents. The party advocates for the use of expansionary fiscal policy. During the 2025 Japanese House of Councillors election, the DPFP softened some policy positions on foreign residents due to claims of xenophobia, while also rescinding their previous support for consumption tax to be halved to 5%.

== Policies ==
The party's policies are built around the slogans "Increase take-home pay" and "Increase take-home pay and beat inflation". Its 2024 policy platform is organized around four main pillars.

=== Four pillars ===
==== An economy in which wages and pensions rise ====
The party calls for boosting consumption through tax cuts, lower social insurance contributions and lower living costs. Its proposals include cutting the consumption tax to 5%, cutting income tax, raising the basic deduction and related deductions from ¥1.03 million to ¥1.78 million, restoring the dependent deduction for children under 16, and reducing the burden on working-age people of the medical care system for people aged 75 and over by increasing public funding. It also proposes lowering gasoline prices by lifting the freeze on the "trigger clause" of the gasoline tax, and lowering electricity bills by suspending the renewable energy surcharge. To encourage investment, it proposes tax cuts for investment in growth fields such as semiconductors, storage batteries, artificial intelligence and Web3, and a separate flat 20% tax on crypto-asset income in place of the current top rate of 55%. Other measures include a package of ten measures to support wage increases at small and medium-sized enterprises and for non-regular workers, linking pension increases to wage increases, and strengthening the minimum guarantee function of the pension system.

==== Defending our own country ====
The party proposes strengthening disaster preparedness for a Nankai Trough earthquake and an earthquake directly beneath the Tokyo area, including air-conditioning gymnasiums used as evacuation shelters, and a "lifeline account" system that would pay benefits automatically, without applications, during disasters or epidemics. It calls for more domestic procurement of energy, food, medicines and semiconductors, and for a "basic food security payment" with the aim of raising Japan's food self-sufficiency rate to 50%. It supports rebuilding existing nuclear power plants and building new ones to secure cheap and stable energy without relying on imports, together with more efficient thermal power as a realistic path to carbon neutrality. It also calls for fostering the defense industry, legislating active cyber defense, and enacting a law restricting land purchases by foreigners that would also cover areas away from defense facilities.

==== Building the nation by investing in people ====
The party proposes issuing about ¥5 trillion a year in "education bonds" to double spending on child-rearing, education, and science and technology. Other proposals include making education compulsory from the age of three; making tuition, school lunches and school trips free through high school; abolishing income limits on support for child-rearing, education and scholarships; reducing income and resident taxes for young workers and easing the burden of student loans, with full exemption for teachers and others; creating an income tax deduction for cram school fees; enacting a law to secure "disposable time" for balancing family, work and study; supporting people who care for both children and elderly relatives and people who combine work with caregiving; measures for the employment ice age generation; reviewing end-of-life care, including legislation on death with dignity; and legislation against customer harassment.

==== Honest politics ====
The party calls for a further revision of the Political Funds Control Act to prohibit slush funds and undisclosed, untaxed money, full disclosure of Diet members' former document, communication and transportation allowance, abolition of "policy activity expenses", and the creation of a third-party body to monitor political funds. It also supports reform of the electoral systems of both houses, a political party law, Diet reform, the introduction of internet voting, lowering the minimum age for candidacy to 18, and a constitutional amendment to keep the Diet functioning during emergencies such as large-scale disasters.

=== Other policy proposals ===
==== Health care ====
In September 2024 the party published proposals for reforming the medical care system. They aim to reduce the burden on working-age people and future generations by basing patients' co-payments on ability to pay rather than age: co-payments for people aged 75 and over would in principle be 20%, or 30% for those with incomes comparable to working people, and financial income and assets would be taken into account when assessing income.

==== Employment ice age generation ====
In June 2024 the party published policy proposals for the employment ice age generation, people who entered the labor market during the hiring slump of the 1990s and 2000s.

==== Wages at small and medium-sized enterprises ====
In March 2024 the party announced ten measures to spread wage increases to small and medium-sized enterprises and non-regular workers. They include reducing social insurance contributions, cutting the consumption tax to 5% and abolishing the qualified invoice system, lowering gasoline, electricity and gas prices, expanding tax breaks for companies that raise wages, raising the officially set prices that fund the pay of medical, nursing-care and childcare workers, and ensuring that companies can pass labor costs on to their customers.

==== Economic measures ====
In October 2023 the party announced an economic package worth about ¥15 trillion. In March 2025 it announced a narrower set of economic proposals titled "Increase take-home pay even more!", limited to its highest-priority measures in the hope that the ruling parties would accept them.

==== Children and young people ====
In February 2023 the party set out its approach to policies for children and child-rearing and how to fund them.

==== Constitution ====
The party supports keeping the basic principles of the Constitution of Japan – popular sovereignty, pacifism and respect for fundamental human rights – while updating the constitution so that these principles can be maintained as times change. In December 2020, three months after its founding, it compiled a comprehensive set of issues for constitutional revision, including draft wording for some articles.

On Article 9, the party argues that successive government interpretations, and the passage of the 2015 security legislation without amending the article, have undermined its force as a legal norm. It has presented options for stating explicitly the scope of the right of self-defense the constitution permits, limited either to individual self-defense or to a limited form of collective self-defense, by revising paragraph 2 of the article or by adding an exception to it. In 2022 it published a draft emergency clause, which it describes as a means of properly controlling, rather than facilitating, the use of state power in emergencies, and in March 2023 it published a joint draft with Nippon Ishin no Kai and the Yushi no Kai parliamentary group covering the extension of Diet members' terms in emergencies. It has also proposed amending Article 19 to protect the freedom to form one's thought and conscience, Article 24 so that marriage is based on the consent of "both parties" rather than "both sexes", and Article 53 so that an extraordinary Diet session must be convened within 20 days of a request by a quarter of the members of either house.

==== Security ====
In December 2022, as the government revised three security documents including the National Security Strategy, the party published its own systematic security policy.

==== Agriculture ====
In May 2023 the party published proposals for the revision of the Basic Act on Food, Agriculture and Rural Areas.

==== Political reform ====
In June 2024 the party criticized the revision of the Political Funds Control Act passed that month as a "sieve law" unworthy of being called fundamental reform, and set out its own proposals for political reform.

== Organization ==
=== Prefectural chapters ===
Prefectural chapters were set up in quick succession after the party's founding: in Aichi, Gifu and Wakayama on 26 September 2020, Yamagata on 27 September, Tokyo on 9 October, Ibaraki on 10 October, Hyogo on 17 October, Shimane on 24 October and Shizuoka on 25 October. Further chapters followed in 2021 and 2022, including Ehime on 1 April 2022, Iwate on 3 April and Nagano on 21 April. The Fukui chapter held its founding convention on 29 April 2022, by which time chapters had been established in all 47 prefectures.

=== Members and supporters ===
Membership is open to Japanese citizens aged 18 or over who support the party's platform and policies, for an annual fee of ¥4,000. Any individual aged 18 or over who wishes to support the party, including Japanese citizens living abroad and foreign residents of Japan, may register as a supporter for an annual fee of ¥2,000. Members and supporters with Japanese citizenship can vote in party leadership elections, but foreign supporters cannot. Registration and voting in leadership elections can be done through the messaging app Line, which the party's secretary-general described as a first in Japan.

Members and supporters together numbered 24,631 in December 2020. At the party convention in February 2022, Tamaki reported that the number had exceeded 50,000 as of October 2021, achieving the party's goal of doubling it, and set a target of more than 70,000. However, 36,682 members and supporters were eligible to vote in the 2023 leadership election. For the 2026 leadership election, 45,155 were eligible as of 31 July 2026: 462 special members, 12,578 members and 32,115 supporters.

=== Student organization ===
On 13 August 2021 a preparatory committee for a student wing was formed, made up mainly of supporters in their teens and twenties; Diet members of the party took part in its online meeting.

== Support base ==
=== Voters ===
After the 2024 general election, in which the party gained seats with its pledge to raise working people's take-home pay, a nationwide Yomiuri Shimbun poll in December 2024 placed it second in party support behind the LDP, ahead of the largest opposition party, the Constitutional Democratic Party of Japan. The rise was attributed to its efforts to raise the "¥1.03 million income wall". An Asahi Shimbun poll the same month found that the party's support was concentrated among people under 60: among people aged 18 to 29 it had 28% support, the highest of any party, and among people in their 40s and 50s its support was more than twice that of the CDP. In a JNN poll in March 2025, the party's support was twice that of the CDP.

The party's support fell in May 2025 amid criticism of its candidate selection, and later fluctuated with the House of Councillors election, the formation of the Takaichi government and the raising of the income wall, but it has remained the most supported opposition party among people aged 18 to 39. In 2026, with the LDP dominant in the House of Representatives, several media polls showed it as the most supported opposition party, albeit with low support overall.

=== Supporting organizations ===
Within Rengo, which supported the party's predecessors, the DPFP has tended to be backed by private-sector unions descended from the former Domei. In 2020 Rengo decided to support the CDP as a whole in the next general election, but for the 2024 election it described both the CDP and the DPFP as the "core of the forces that will take charge of government", urged them to reach agreement on policy, and supported both parties.

Of the six industrial unions that backed the former Democratic Party For the People, the two whose Diet members joined the new party were the Federation of Electric Power Related Industry Workers' Unions (Denryoku Soren) and the Japanese Electrical Electronic & Information Union (Denki Rengo). Diet members sponsored by industrial unions include:

Union	Member	Chamber
Denryoku Soren	Hitoshi Takezume	House of Councillors (national PR, term ending 2028)
Denryoku Soren	Yoshifumi Hamano	House of Councillors (national PR, term ending 2031)
Denki Rengo	Satoshi Asano	House of Representatives (Ibaraki 5th district)
Denki Rengo	Kota Hirato	House of Councillors (national PR, term ending 2031)
UA Zensen	Takanori Kawai	House of Councillors (national PR, term ending 2028)
UA Zensen	Mami Tamura	House of Councillors (national PR, term ending 2031)
Confederation of Japan Automobile Workers' Unions (Jidosha Soren)	Makoto Hamaguchi	House of Councillors (national PR, term ending 2028)
Confederation of Japan Automobile Workers' Unions (Jidosha Soren)	Tetsuji Isozaki	House of Councillors (national PR, term ending 2031)

JAM and the Japan Federation of Basic Industry Workers' Unions, both private-sector unions that had supported the party, switched to fielding their sponsored candidates from the CDP from the 2022 House of Councillors election, despite some policy differences, on the grounds that they "absolutely must win" elections. The party designates the National Reform Discussion Group (Kokumin Kaikaku Kondankai) as its political fund-raising organization.

In October 2020, the month after its founding, the party left the joint House of Representatives parliamentary group with the CDP and the Social Democratic Party, despite requests to reconsider from CDP leader Yukio Edano and Rengo president Rikio Kozu. In 2021 it ended its cooperation with the Civil Alliance for Peace and Constitutionalism, the civic group that had coordinated cooperation among opposition parties including the Japanese Communist Party, citing incompatible positions on issues such as nuclear power, while the CDP, the Communist Party, the SDP and Reiwa Shinsengumi continued to cooperate with it.

== Leadership ==
Position	Name
Leader	Yuichiro Tamaki
Deputy Leader	Motohisa Furukawa
Secretary General	Kazuya Shimba
Chairman in the House of Councillors	Yasue Funayama
Chairman of the General Council	Yoshifumi Hamano
Chairman of the Diet Affairs Committee	Motohisa Furukawa
Chairman of the Policy Affairs Research Council	Makoto Hamaguchi
Chairman of the Election Strategy Committee	Toshihide Muraoka
Deputy Secretary General Secretary General in the House of Councillors	Takanori Kawai

== Leaders ==
No.	Name	Constituency / title	Term of office		Image	Election results
No.	Name	Constituency / title	Took office	Left office	Image	Election results
Preceding parties: Democratic Party (2016) (centre), Kibō no Tō (centre-right), and Liberal Party (2016) (centre-left)
1	Co-leadership; Kohei Otsuka (1959–2026) Yuichiro Tamaki (born 1969)	Otsuka: Cou for Aichi; Tamaki: Rep for Kagawa 2nd	7 May 2018	4 September 2018		DP; 2017 Unopposed Kibō; 2017 Yuichiro Tamaki – 39; Hiroshi Ogushi –14
2	Yuichiro Tamaki (born 1969)	Rep for Kagawa 2nd	4 September 2018	11 September 2020		2018 Yuichiro Tamaki – 204; Keisuke Tsumura – 74
Successor parties: Constitutional Democratic Party (centre-left) and Democratic Party For the People (centre-right)
1	Yuichiro Tamaki (born 1969)	Rep for Kagawa 2nd	11 September 2020	Incumbent (Note: Tamaki was suspended from his leadership position by the DPFP on 4 December 2024 for three months following the revelation of an extramarital affair.)		2020 Yuichiro Tamaki – 65; Takae Itō – 26 2023 Yuichiro Tamaki – 80; Seiji Maehara – 31
—	Motohisa Furukawa (born 1965); Acting	Rep for Aichi 2nd	4 December 2024	4 March 2025		

== Election results ==
=== House of Representatives ===
House of Representatives
Election	Leader	Candidates	Seats			Position	Constituency votes		PR Block votes		Government
Election	Leader	Candidates	No.	±	Share	Position	Number	%	Number	%	Government
2021	Yuichiro Tamaki	27	11 / 465		2.4%	5th	1,246,812	2.17%	2,593,396	4.51%	Opposition
2024	Yuichiro Tamaki	42	28 / 465	▲17	6.0%	▲4th	2,349,584	4.33%	6,172,427	11.32%	Opposition
2026	Yuichiro Tamaki	104	28 / 465	Steady	6.0%	4th	4,243,282	7.52%	5,572,951	9.73%	Opposition

=== House of Councillors ===
House of Councillors
Election	Leader	Candidates	Seats					Position	Constituency votes		PR Block votes		Status
Election	Leader	Candidates	Won	±	Share	Total (Note: The Upper house is split in two classes, one elected every three years.)	±	Position	No.	Share	No.	Share	Status
2019	Yuichiro Tamaki		6 / 124		4.83%	21 / 248		6th	3,256,859	6.47%	3,481,078	6.95%	Opposition
Successor parties: Constitutional Democratic Party (centre-left) & Democratic Party For the People (centre-right)
2022	Yuichiro Tamaki	22	5 / 125		4.00%	10 / 248		6th	2,038,655	3.83%	3,159,657	5.96%	Opposition
2025	Yuichiro Tamaki	41	17 / 125	▲12	13.60%	22 / 248	▲12	3rd	7,180,653	12.14%	7,620,493	12.88%	Opposition

== Mascot ==
The party's official mascot is Kokumin Usagi (こくみんうさぎ, "the people's rabbit"), a rabbit with "long ears to listen to the voices of the people" and "round eyes that see reality". Official merchandise featuring the character, such as T-shirts and stationery, is sold, and a costumed version of the character appears at party events.

== Slogans ==
Under Tamaki's leadership the party has used slogans including "We have policies" (政策がある), "Move, Japan." (動け、日本。), "Raise wages, protect the country" (給料を上げる。国を守る) and "Increase take-home pay" (手取りを増やす。).

== See also ==
- Centrist populism
- Conservative mainstream (in Japanese)
- Minsha kyōkai
