= List of members of the Diet of Japan =

This is a list of members of the Diet of Japan. The Diet has two chambers: the Senate (upper house) and the House of Representatives (lower house). Senators serve six year terms, with half being elected every three years. Representatives serve terms of up to four years, but the House of Representatives can be dissolved, causing a shorter term (snap election).

== House of Representatives ==
Below are lists of representatives elected in Japanese general elections since 2003.

- Members of the House of Representatives elected in the 43rd general election (2003)
- Members of the House of Representatives elected in the 44th general election (2005)
- Members of the House of Representatives elected in the 45th general election (2009)
- Members of the House of Representatives elected in the 46th general election (2012)
- Members of the House of Representatives elected in the 47th general election (2014)
- Members of the House of Representatives elected in the 48th general election (2017)
- Members of the House of Representatives elected in the 49th general election (2021)
- Members of the House of Representatives elected in the 50th general election (2024)
- Current list: Members of the House of Representatives elected in the 51st general election (2026)

=== Composition ===
Composition of the House of Representatives of Japan (as of 25 September 2026)
Parliamentary groups/caucuses	Parties	Seats
Liberal Democratic Party / Assembly of Independents; Jiyūminshutō・Mushozoku no Kai	Liberal Democratic Party (LDP); Independents	315
Centrists; Chūdō	Komeito; Democratic Reform Party; Centrist Reform Alliance; Independents	47
Nippon Ishin no Kai; Nippon Ishin no Kai	Nippon Ishin no Kai	36
Democratic Party for the People / Independent Club; Kokumin Minshutō・Mushozoku Kurabu	Democratic Party For the People (DPFP)	28
Sanseitō; Sanseitō	Sanseitō	15
Team Mirai; Chīmu Mirai	Team Mirai	11
Japanese Communist Party; Nihon Kyōsantō	Japanese Communist Party (JCP)	4
Independents (not member of a caucus); Mushozoku	LDP (Speaker); CRA (Vice Speaker); Independents (not member of a party); Party of Life; Tax Cuts Japan and Yukoku Alliance	8
Vacant	Casual vacancy	1
Total		465

The following table lists members of the House of Representatives by constituency and parliamentary group (会派, kaiha) as of 18 February 2026. The elected party column shows the party under which each member was elected; the parliamentary group column shows their current parliamentary group membership, which may differ.

Notes:

- Not all members of a parliamentary group are necessarily members of the associated party/parties if any, and vice versa. For example, the Speaker and Vice-Speaker of the House of Representatives are independents in terms of parliamentary group membership, but not independents in terms of party membership.

Constituency	Elected members	Elected party	Parliamentary group	Notes
=== Hokkaido === 12 single-member and 8 proportional representation seats.
==== Hokkaido Prefecture ====
Hokkaido-1st	Takahiro Katō	Liberal Democratic	LDP	
Hokkaido-2nd	Yūsuke Takahashi	Liberal Democratic	LDP	
Hokkaidō-3rd	Hirohisa Takagi	Liberal Democratic	LDP	
Hokkaidō-4th	Hiroyuki Nakamura	Liberal Democratic	LDP	
Hokkaidō-5th	Yoshiaki Wada	Liberal Democratic	LDP	
Hokkaidō-6th	Kuniyoshi Azuma	Liberal Democratic	LDP	
Hokkaidō-7th	Takako Suzuki	Liberal Democratic	LDP	
Hokkaidō-8th	Jun Mukōyama	Liberal Democratic	LDP	
Hokkaidō-9th	Hideki Matsushita	Liberal Democratic	LDP	
Hokkaidō-10th	Hiroshi Kamiya	CRA	CRA	
Hokkaidō-11th	Kōichi Nakagawa	Liberal Democratic	LDP	
Hokkaidō-12th	Arata Takebe	Liberal Democratic	LDP	
==== Hokkaido Block ====
Hokkaidō block	Yoshitaka Itō	Liberal Democratic	LDP	
Hokkaidō block	Hidemichi Satō	CRA	CRA	
Hokkaidō block	Kōichi Watanabe	Liberal Democratic	LDP	
Hokkaidō block	Nagisa Muraki	Liberal Democratic	LDP	
Hokkaidō block	Tomoko Ukishima	CRA	CRA	
Hokkaidō block	Yūri Yoshida	Liberal Democratic	LDP	
Hokkaidō block	Hidetake Usuki	DPFP	DPFP	
Hokkaidō block	Tatsumaru Yamaoka	CRA	CRA	
=== Tōhoku === 21 single-member and 12 proportional representation seats.
==== Aomori Prefecture ====
Aomori-1st	Jun Tsushima	Liberal Democratic	LDP	
Aomori-2nd	Junichi Kanda	Liberal Democratic	LDP	
Aomori-3rd	Jiro Kimura	Liberal Democratic	LDP	
==== Iwate Prefecture ====
Iwate-1st	Takeshi Shina	CRA	CRA	
Iwate-2nd	Shun'ichi Suzuki	Liberal Democratic	LDP	
Iwate-3rd	Takashi Fujiwara	Liberal Democratic	LDP	
==== Miyagi Prefecture ====
Miyagi-1st	Tōru Doi	Liberal Democratic	LDP	
Miyagi-2nd	Katsuyuki Watanabe	Liberal Democratic	LDP	
Miyagi-3rd	Akihiro Nishimura	Liberal Democratic	LDP	
Miyagi-4th	Chisato Morishita	Liberal Democratic	LDP	
Miyagi-5th	Itsunori Onodera	Liberal Democratic	LDP	
==== Akita Prefecture ====
Akita-1st	Hiroyuki Togashi	Liberal Democratic	LDP	
Akita-2nd	Junji Fukuhara	Liberal Democratic	LDP	
Akita-3rd	Toshihide Muraoka	DPFP	DPFP	
==== Yamagata Prefecture ====
Yamagata-1st	Hiroaki Endo	Liberal Democratic	LDP	
Yamagata-2nd	Norikazu Suzuki	Liberal Democratic	LDP	
Yamagata-3rd	Ayuko Kato	Liberal Democratic	LDP	
==== Fukushima Prefecture ====
Fukushima-1st	Naotoshi Nishiyama	Liberal Democratic	LDP	
Fukushima-2nd	Taku Nemoto	Liberal Democratic	LDP	
Fukushima-3rd	Kentaro Uesugi	Liberal Democratic	LDP	
Fukushima-4th	Ryutaro Sakamoto	Liberal Democratic	LDP	
==== Tohoku Block ====
Tōhoku block	Akinori Eto	Liberal Democratic	LDP	
Tōhoku block	Kenichi Shōji	CRA	CRA	
Tōhoku block	Nobuhide Minorikawa	Liberal Democratic	LDP	
Tōhoku block	Hiromasa Yonai	Liberal Democratic	LDP	
Tōhoku block	Yoshifu Arita	CRA	CRA	
Tōhoku block	Shintaro Ito	Liberal Democratic	LDP	
Tōhoku block	Makoto Sasaki	DPFP	DPFP	
Tōhoku block	Ichirō Kanke	Liberal Democratic	LDP	
Tōhoku block	Masamune Wada	Sanseitō	Sanseitō	
Tōhoku block	Emi Kaneko	CRA	CRA	
Tōhoku block	Kenya Akiba	Liberal Democratic	LDP	
Tōhoku block	Takumi Hayashi	Team Mirai	Team Mirai	
=== Northern Kanto (Kita Kanto) === 33 single-member and 19 proportional representation seats.
==== Ibaraki Prefecture ====
Ibaraki-1st	Yoshinori Tadokoro	Liberal Democratic	LDP	
Ibaraki-2nd	Fukushiro Nukaga	Liberal Democratic	LDP	
Ibaraki-3rd	Yasuhiro Hanashi	Liberal Democratic	LDP	
Ibaraki-4th	Hiroshi Kajiyama	Liberal Democratic	LDP	
Ibaraki-5th	Satoshi Asano	DPFP	DPFP	
Ibaraki-6th	Ayano Kunimitsu	Liberal Democratic	LDP	
Ibaraki-7th	Hayato Nakamura	Independent	Independent	
==== Tochigi Prefecture ====
Tochigi-1st	Hajime Funada	Liberal Democratic	LDP	
Tochigi-2nd	Kiyoshi Igarashi	Liberal Democratic	LDP	
Tochigi-3rd	Shintaro Watanabe	Independent	Independent	
Tochigi-4th	Masaru Ishizaka	Liberal Democratic	LDP	
Tochigi-5th	Toshimitsu Motegi	Liberal Democratic	LDP	
==== Gunma Prefecture ====
Gunma-1st	Yasutaka Nakasone	Liberal Democratic	LDP	
Gunma-2nd	Toshiro Ino	Liberal Democratic	LDP	
Gunma-3rd	Hiroyoshi Sasagawa	Liberal Democratic	LDP	
Gunma-4th	Tatsuo Fukuda	Liberal Democratic	LDP	
Gunma-5th	Yūko Obuchi	Liberal Democratic	LDP	
==== Saitama Prefecture ====
Saitama-1st	Hideki Murai	Liberal Democratic	LDP	
Saitama-2nd	Yoshitaka Shindō	Liberal Democratic	LDP	
Saitama-3rd	Hitoshi Kikawada	Liberal Democratic	LDP	
Saitama-4th	Yasushi Hosaka	Liberal Democratic	LDP	
Saitama-5th	Yutaka Ihara	Liberal Democratic	LDP	
Saitama-6th	Akihito Obana	Liberal Democratic	LDP	
Saitama-7th	Hideyuki Nakano	Liberal Democratic	LDP	
Saitama-8th	Masahiko Shibayama	Liberal Democratic	LDP	
Saitama-9th	Taku Otsuka	Liberal Democratic	LDP	
Saitama-10th	Susumu Yamaguchi	Liberal Democratic	LDP	
Saitama-11th	Ryuji Koizumi	Liberal Democratic	LDP	
Saitama-12th	Atsushi Nonaka	Liberal Democratic	LDP	
Saitama-13th	Hiromi Mitsubayashi	Liberal Democratic	LDP	
Saitama-14th	Makoto Fujita	Liberal Democratic	LDP	
Saitama-15th	Ryosei Tanaka	Liberal Democratic	LDP	
Saitama-16th	Shinako Tsuchiya	Liberal Democratic	LDP	
==== Kita Kanto Block ====
Kita Kantō block	Kazuo Yana	Liberal Democratic	LDP	
Kita Kantō block	Keiichi Ishii	CRA	Independent	
Kita Kantō block	Keiko Nagaoka	Liberal Democratic	LDP	
Kita Kantō block	Takumi Suzuki	Liberal Democratic	LDP	
Kita Kantō block	Mikihiko Hashimoto	DPFP	DPFP	
Kita Kantō block	Keiichi Koshimizu	CRA	CRA	
Kita Kantō block	Kazuyuki Nakane	Liberal Democratic	LDP	
Kita Kantō block	Mayuko Toyota	Sanseitō	Sanseitō	
Kita Kantō block	Kazuko Mutō	Team Mirai	Team Mirai	
Kita Kantō block	Masayoshi Saijō	Liberal Democratic	LDP	
Kita Kantō block	Takahiro Fukushige	CRA	CRA	
Kita Kantō block	Akimasa Ishikawa	Liberal Democratic	LDP	
Kita Kantō block	Yūji Kashiwakura	Nippon Ishin	Nippon Ishin	
Kita Kantō block	Asako Omi	Liberal Democratic	LDP	
Kita Kantō block	Yoshihiro Suzuki	DPFP	DPFP	
Kita Kantō block	Atsushi Oshima	CRA	CRA	
Kita Kantō block	Megumi Maekawa	Liberal Democratic	LDP	
Kita Kantō block	Tetsuya Shiokawa	JCP	JCP	
Kita Kantō block	Hitomi Aoki	Sanseitō	Sanseitō	
=== South Kanto (Minami Kanto) === 36 single-member and 23 proportional representation seats.
==== Chiba Prefecture ====
Chiba-1st	Hiroaki Kadoyama	Liberal Democratic	LDP	
Chiba-2nd	Takayuki Kobayashi	Liberal Democratic	LDP	
Chiba-3rd	Hirokazu Matsuno	Liberal Democratic	LDP	
Chiba-4th	Yūsuke Kashima	Liberal Democratic	LDP	
Chiba-5th	Arfiya Eri	Liberal Democratic	LDP	
Chiba-6th	Hiromichi Watanabe	Liberal Democratic	LDP	
Chiba-7th	Ken Saitō	Liberal Democratic	LDP	
Chiba-8th	Izumi Matsumoto	Liberal Democratic	LDP	
Chiba-9th	Hisato Tamiya	Liberal Democratic	LDP	
Chiba-10th	Masaaki Koike	Liberal Democratic	LDP	
Chiba-11th	Eisuke Mori	Liberal Democratic	Independent	
Chiba-12th	Yasukazu Hamada	Liberal Democratic	LDP	
Chiba-13th	Hisashi Matsumoto	Liberal Democratic	LDP	
Chiba-14th	Yoshihiko Noda	CRA	CRA	
==== Kanagawa Prefecture ====
Kanagawa-1st	Natsuko Maruo	Liberal Democratic	LDP	
Kanagawa-2nd	Shōbun Nitta	Liberal Democratic	LDP	
Kanagawa-3rd	Kenji Nakanishi	Liberal Democratic	LDP	
Kanagawa-4th	Marina Nagata	Liberal Democratic	LDP	
Kanagawa-5th	Manabu Sakai	Liberal Democratic	LDP	
Kanagawa-6th	Naoki Furukawa	Liberal Democratic	LDP	
Kanagawa-7th	Keisuke Suzuki	Liberal Democratic	LDP	
Kanagawa-8th	Hidehiro Mitani	Liberal Democratic	LDP	
Kanagawa-9th	Masahiro Uehara	Liberal Democratic	LDP	
Kanagawa-10th	Kazunori Tanaka	Liberal Democratic	LDP	
Kanagawa-11th	Shinjiro Koizumi	Liberal Democratic	LDP	
Kanagawa-12th	Tsuyoshi Hoshino	Liberal Democratic	LDP	
Kanagawa-13th	Kōichirō Maruta	Liberal Democratic	LDP	
Kanagawa-14th	Jiro Akama	Liberal Democratic	LDP	
Kanagawa-15th	Taro Kono	Liberal Democratic	LDP	
Kanagawa-16th	Masashi Satō	Liberal Democratic	LDP	
Kanagawa-17th	Karen Makishima	Liberal Democratic	LDP	
Kanagawa-18th	Daishiro Yamagiwa	Liberal Democratic	LDP	
Kanagawa-19th	Tsuyoshi Kusama	Liberal Democratic	LDP	
Kanagawa-20th	Yui Kanazawa	Liberal Democratic	LDP	
==== Yamanashi Prefecture ====
Yamanashi-1st	Shinichi Nakatani	Liberal Democratic	LDP	
Yamanashi-2nd	Noriko Horiuchi	Liberal Democratic	LDP	
==== Minami Kanto Block ====
Minami Kantō block	Harunobu Nagano	Liberal Democratic	LDP	
Minami Kantō block	Hideo Tsunoda	CRA	CRA	
Minami Kantō block	Satoshi Itō	Liberal Democratic	LDP	
Minami Kantō block	Ryo Fuzuki	Liberal Democratic	LDP	
Minami Kantō block	Jesús Fukasaku	DPFP	DPFP	
Minami Kantō block	Mitsuko Numazaki	CRA	CRA	
Minami Kantō block	Michio Kawai	Team Mirai	Team Mirai	
Minami Kantō block	Hina Iwasaki	Liberal Democratic	LDP	
Minami Kantō block	Megu Nakaya	Sanseitō	Sanseitō	
Minami Kantō block	Naoki Harada	CRA	CRA	
Minami Kantō block	Ryuna Kanemura	Nippon Ishin	Nippon Ishin	
Minami Kantō block	Yoshitaka Nishioka	DPFP	DPFP	
Minami Kantō block	Hirofumi Ryu	CRA	CRA	
Minami Kantō block	Eri Yamada	Team Mirai	Team Mirai	
Minami Kantō block	Kimie Hatano	JCP	JCP	
Minami Kantō block	Yūichi Gotō	CRA	CRA	
Minami Kantō block	Seiko Kudō	Sanseitō	Sanseitō	
Minami Kantō block	Junko Okano	DPFP	DPFP	
Minami Kantō block	Yuki Waseda	CRA	CRA	
Minami Kantō block	Mitsuhiro Yokota	Nippon Ishin	Nippon Ishin	
Minami Kantō block	Shūhei Kobayashi	Team Mirai	Team Mirai	
Minami Kantō block	Kaname Tajima	CRA	CRA	
Minami Kantō block	Joji Yamamoto	Reiwa	Independent	
=== Tokyo === 30 single-member and 19 proportional representation seats.
==== Tokyo Prefecture ====
Tokyo-1st	Miki Yamada	Liberal Democratic	LDP	
Tokyo-2nd	Kiyoto Tsuji	Liberal Democratic	LDP	
Tokyo-3rd	Hirotaka Ishihara	Liberal Democratic	LDP	
Tokyo-4th	Masaaki Taira	Liberal Democratic	LDP	
Tokyo-5th	Kenji Wakamiya	Liberal Democratic	LDP	
Tokyo-6th	Shōgo Azemoto	Liberal Democratic	LDP	
Tokyo-7th	Tamayo Marukawa	Liberal Democratic	LDP	
Tokyo-8th	Hiroko Kado	Liberal Democratic	LDP	
Tokyo-9th	Isshu Sugawara	Liberal Democratic	LDP	
Tokyo-10th	Hayato Suzuki	Liberal Democratic	LDP	
Tokyo-11th	Hakubun Shimomura	Liberal Democratic	LDP	
Tokyo-12th	Kei Takagi	Liberal Democratic	LDP	
Tokyo-13th	Shin Tsuchida	Liberal Democratic	LDP	
Tokyo-14th	Midori Matsushima	Liberal Democratic	LDP	
Tokyo-15th	Kōki Ōzora	Liberal Democratic	LDP	
Tokyo-16th	Yohei Onishi	Liberal Democratic	LDP	
Tokyo-17th	Katsuei Hirasawa	Liberal Democratic	LDP	
Tokyo-18th	Kaoru Fukuda	Liberal Democratic	LDP	
Tokyo-19th	Yohei Matsumoto	Liberal Democratic	LDP	
Tokyo-20th	Seiji Kihara	Liberal Democratic	LDP	
Tokyo-21st	Kiyoshi Odawara	Liberal Democratic	LDP	
Tokyo-22nd	Tatsuya Ito	Liberal Democratic	LDP	
Tokyo-23rd	Shinichiro Kawamatsu	Liberal Democratic	LDP	
Tokyo-24th	Koichi Hagiuda	Liberal Democratic	LDP	
Tokyo-25th	Shinji Inoue	Liberal Democratic	LDP	
Tokyo-26th	Ueki Imaoka	Liberal Democratic	LDP	
Tokyo-27th	Yūichi Kurosaki	Liberal Democratic	LDP	
Tokyo-28th	Takao Andō	Liberal Democratic	LDP	
Tokyo-29th	Kōsuke Nagasawa	Liberal Democratic	LDP	
Tokyo-30th	Akihisa Nagashima	Liberal Democratic	LDP	
==== Tokyo Block ====
Tokyo block	Masashi Tanaka	Liberal Democratic	LDP	
Tokyo block	Yuko Tsuji	Liberal Democratic	LDP	
Tokyo block	Mitsunari Okamoto	CRA	CRA	
Tokyo block	Satoshi Takayama	Team Mirai	Team Mirai	
Tokyo block	Kiyoko Morihara	Liberal Democratic	LDP	
Tokyo block	Yosuke Mori	DPFP	DPFP	
Tokyo block	Kōichi Kasai	CRA	CRA	
Tokyo block	Yūya Mineshima	Team Mirai	Team Mirai	
Tokyo block	Rina Yoshikawa	Sanseitō	Sanseitō	
Tokyo block	Tomoko Tamura	JCP	JCP	
Tokyo block	Tsukasa Abe	Nippon Ishin	Nippon Ishin	
Tokyo block	Kazumoto Takazawa	DPFP	DPFP	
Tokyo block	Eriko Omori	CRA	CRA	
Tokyo block	Noboru Usami	Team Mirai	Team Mirai	
Tokyo block	Akira Nagatsuma	CRA	CRA	
Tokyo block	Masae Ido	DPFP	DPFP	
Tokyo block	Takayuki Ochiai	CRA	CRA	
Tokyo block	Akihiro Dobashi	Team Mirai	Team Mirai	
Tokyo block	Mika Suzuki	Sanseitō	Sanseitō	
=== Hokuriku Shinetsu === 18 single-member and 10 proportional representation seats.
==== Niigata Prefecture ====
Niigata-1st	Kō Uchiyama	Liberal Democratic	LDP	
Niigata-2nd	Isato Kunisada	Liberal Democratic	LDP	
Niigata-3rd	Hiroaki Saito	Liberal Democratic	LDP	
Niigata-4th	Eiichiro Washio	Liberal Democratic	LDP	
Niigata-5th	Shuichi Takatori	Liberal Democratic	LDP	
==== Toyama Prefecture ====
Toyama-1st	Hiroshi Nakada	Liberal Democratic	LDP	
Toyama-2nd	Eishun Ueda	Liberal Democratic	LDP	
Toyama-3rd	Keiichiro Tachibana	Liberal Democratic	LDP	
==== Ishikawa Prefecture ====
Ishikawa-1st	Takuo Komori	Liberal Democratic	LDP	
Ishikawa-2nd	Hajime Sasaki	Liberal Democratic	LDP	
Ishikawa-3rd	Shoji Nishida	Liberal Democratic	LDP	
==== Fukui Prefecture ====
Fukui-1st	Tomomi Inada	Liberal Democratic	LDP	
Fukui-2nd	Takeshi Saiki	Liberal Democratic	LDP	
==== Nagano Prefecture ====
Nagano-1st	Kenta Wakabayashi	Liberal Democratic	LDP	
Nagano-2nd	Hikaru Fujita	Liberal Democratic	LDP	
Nagano-3rd	Yosei Ide	Liberal Democratic	LDP	
Nagano-4th	Shigeyuki Goto	Liberal Democratic	LDP	
Nagano-5th	Ichiro Miyashita	Liberal Democratic	LDP	
==== Hokuriku-Shinetsu Block ====
Hokuriku-Shinetsu block	Hiroaki Tabata	Liberal Democratic	LDP	
Hokuriku-Shinetsu block	Yosuke Kon	Liberal Democratic	LDP	
Hokuriku-Shinetsu block	Hiromasa Nakagawa	CRA	CRA	
Hokuriku-Shinetsu block	Kōsuke Furui	Liberal Democratic	LDP	
Hokuriku-Shinetsu block	Kai Odake	DPFP	DPFP	
Hokuriku-Shinetsu block	Kazuya Kondo	CRA	CRA	
Hokuriku-Shinetsu block	Yuichiro Kawa	Sanseitō	Sanseitō	
Hokuriku-Shinetsu block	Kiyoshi Wakasa	Nippon Ishin	Nippon Ishin	
Hokuriku-Shinetsu block	Chinami Nishimura	CRA	CRA	
Hokuriku-Shinetsu block	Makiko Kikuta	CRA	CRA	
=== Tokai === 33 single-member and 21 proportional representation seats.
==== Gifu Prefecture ====
Gifu-1st	Seiko Noda	Liberal Democratic	LDP	
Gifu-2nd	Yasufumi Tanahashi	Liberal Democratic	LDP	
Gifu-3rd	Yoji Muto	Liberal Democratic	LDP	
Gifu-4th	Tomohiro Katō	Liberal Democratic	LDP	
Gifu-5th	Keiji Furuya	Liberal Democratic	LDP	
==== Shizuoka Prefecture ====
Shizuoka-1st	Yōko Kamikawa	Liberal Democratic	LDP	
Shizuoka-2nd	Tatsunori Ibayashi	Liberal Democratic	LDP	
Shizuoka-3rd	Yūzō Yamamoto	Liberal Democratic	LDP	
Shizuoka-4th	Yoichi Fukazawa	Liberal Democratic	LDP	
Shizuoka-5th	Goshi Hosono	Liberal Democratic	LDP	
Shizuoka-6th	Takaaki Katsumata	Liberal Democratic	LDP	
Shizuoka-7th	Minoru Kiuchi	Liberal Democratic	LDP	
Shizuoka-8th	Daisuke Inaba	Liberal Democratic	LDP	
==== Aichi Prefecture ====
Aichi-1st	Takashi Kawamura	Tax Cuts Japan and Yukoku Alliance	Independent	
Aichi-2nd	Motohisa Furukawa	DPFP	DPFP	
Aichi-3rd	Yoshihiko Mizuno	Liberal Democratic	LDP	
Aichi-4th	Shozō Kudō	Liberal Democratic	LDP	
Aichi-5th	Yasuhiro Okamoto	Liberal Democratic	LDP	
Aichi-6th	Hideki Niwa	Liberal Democratic	LDP	
Aichi-7th	Saria Hino	DPFP	DPFP	
Aichi-8th	Tadahiko Ito	Liberal Democratic	LDP	
Aichi-9th	Yasumasa Nagasaka	Liberal Democratic	LDP	
Aichi-10th	Shinji Wakamiya	Liberal Democratic	LDP	
Aichi-11th	Midori Tanno	DPFP	DPFP	
Aichi-12th	Shuhei Aoyama	Liberal Democratic	LDP	
Aichi-13th	Taku Ishii	Liberal Democratic	LDP	
Aichi-14th	Soichiro Imaeda	Liberal Democratic	LDP	
Aichi-15th	Yukinori Nemoto	Liberal Democratic	LDP	
Aichi-16th	Shizuo Yamashita	Liberal Democratic	LDP	
==== Mie Prefecture ====
Mie-1st	Norihisa Tamura	Liberal Democratic	LDP	
Mie-2nd	Hideto Kawasaki	Liberal Democratic	LDP	
Mie-3rd	Masataka Ishihara	Liberal Democratic	LDP	
Mie-4th	Eikei Suzuki	Liberal Democratic	LDP	
==== Tokai Block ====
Tokai block	Sakon Yamamoto	Liberal Democratic	LDP	
Tokai block	Junji Suzuki	Liberal Democratic	LDP	
Tokai block	Yasuhiro Nakagawa	CRA	CRA	
Tokai block	Hiromichi Kumada	Liberal Democratic	LDP	
Tokai block	Ken Tanaka	DPFP	DPFP	
Tokai block	Hideki Tsuji	Liberal Democratic	LDP	
Tokai block	Katsuhide Nishizono	CRA	CRA	
Tokai block	Airi Watanabe	Sanseitō	Sanseitō	
Tokai block	Tadamori Fujisawa	Liberal Democratic	LDP	
Tokai block	Eitarō Sudō	Team Mirai	Team Mirai	
Tokai block	Kenichi Hosoda	Liberal Democratic	LDP	
Tokai block	Toru Fukuta	DPFP	DPFP	
Tokai block	Kenichiro Seki	Nippon Ishin	Nippon Ishin	
Tokai block	Akiyoshi Inukai	CRA	CRA	
Tokai block	Takamoto Nakagawa	Liberal Democratic	LDP	
Tokai block	Rie Saito	Liberal Democratic	LDP	
Tokai block	Kazuhiko Shigetoku	CRA	CRA	
Tokai block	Koichiro Osada	Liberal Democratic	LDP	
Tokai block	Miho Nomura	DPFP	DPFP	
Tokai block	Keisuke Itō	Sanseitō	Sanseitō	
Tokai block	Mamiko Seko	Liberal Democratic	LDP	
=== Kinki === 45 single-member and 28 proportional representation seats.
==== Shiga Prefecture ====
Shiga-1st	Toshitaka Ōoka	Liberal Democratic	LDP	
Shiga-2nd	Kenichiro Ueno	Liberal Democratic	LDP	
Shiga-3rd	Nobuhide Takemura	Liberal Democratic	LDP	
==== Kyoto Prefecture ====
Kyōto-1st	Yasushi Katsume	Liberal Democratic	LDP	
Kyōto-2nd	Seiji Maehara	Nippon Ishin	Nippon Ishin	
Kyōto-3rd	Kenta Izumi	CRA	CRA	
Kyōto-4th	Keiro Kitagami	Liberal Democratic	LDP	
Kyōto-5th	Taro Honda	Liberal Democratic	LDP	
Kyōto-6th	Hiromichi Sonosaki	Liberal Democratic	LDP	
==== Osaka Prefecture ====
Ōsaka-1st	Hidetaka Inoue	Nippon Ishin	Nippon Ishin	
Ōsaka-2nd	Ryo Takami	Nippon Ishin	Nippon Ishin	
Ōsaka-3rd	Tōru Azuma	Nippon Ishin	Nippon Ishin	
Ōsaka-4th	Teruo Minobe	Nippon Ishin	Nippon Ishin	
Ōsaka-5th	Satoshi Umemura	Nippon Ishin	Nippon Ishin	
Ōsaka-6th	Kaoru Nishida	Nippon Ishin	Nippon Ishin	
Ōsaka-7th	Takemitsu Okushita	Nippon Ishin	Nippon Ishin	
Ōsaka-8th	Joji Uruma	Nippon Ishin	Nippon Ishin	
Ōsaka-9th	Kei Hagihara	Nippon Ishin	Nippon Ishin	
Ōsaka-10th	Taku Ikeshita	Nippon Ishin	Nippon Ishin	
Ōsaka-11th	Hiroshi Nakatsuka	Nippon Ishin	Nippon Ishin	
Ōsaka-12th	Fumitake Fujita	Nippon Ishin	Nippon Ishin	
Ōsaka-13th	Ryohei Iwatani	Nippon Ishin	Nippon Ishin	
Ōsaka-14th	Hitoshi Aoyagi	Nippon Ishin	Nippon Ishin	
Ōsaka-15th	Yasuto Urano	Nippon Ishin	Nippon Ishin	
Ōsaka-16th	Masaki Kuroda	Nippon Ishin	Nippon Ishin	
Ōsaka-17th	Nobuyuki Baba	Nippon Ishin	Nippon Ishin	
Ōsaka-18th	Takashi Endo	Nippon Ishin	Nippon Ishin	
Ōsaka-19th	Tomu Tanigawa	Liberal Democratic	LDP	
==== Hyogo Prefecture ====
Hyōgo-1st	Masahito Moriyama	Liberal Democratic	LDP	
Hyōgo-2nd	Keishi Abe	Nippon Ishin	Nippon Ishin	
Hyōgo-3rd	Yoshihiro Seki	Liberal Democratic	LDP	
Hyōgo-4th	Hisayuki Fujii	Liberal Democratic	LDP	
Hyōgo-5th	Koichi Tani	Liberal Democratic	LDP	
Hyōgo-6th	Masaki Ogushi	Liberal Democratic	LDP	
Hyōgo-7th	Kenji Yamada	Liberal Democratic	LDP	
Hyōgo-8th	Shigeharu Aoyama	Liberal Democratic	LDP	
Hyōgo-9th	Yasutoshi Nishimura	Liberal Democratic	LDP	
Hyōgo-10th	Kisaburo Tokai	Liberal Democratic	LDP	
Hyōgo-11th	Motoyasu Yamada	Liberal Democratic	LDP	
Hyōgo-12th	Tsuyoshi Yamaguchi	Liberal Democratic	LDP	
==== Nara Prefecture ====
Nara-1st	Shigeki Kobayashi	Liberal Democratic	LDP	
Nara-2nd	Sanae Takaichi	Liberal Democratic	LDP	
Nara-3rd	Taido Tanose	Liberal Democratic	LDP	
==== Wakayama Prefecture ====
Wakayama-1st	Daichi Yamamoto	Liberal Democratic	LDP	
Wakayama-2nd	Hiroshige Sekō	Independent	LDP	
==== Kinki Block ====
Kinki block	Hiroo Kotera	Liberal Democratic	LDP	
Kinki block	Daisuke Harayama	Nippon Ishin	Nippon Ishin	
Kinki block	Masatoshi Ishida	Liberal Democratic	LDP	
Kinki block	Nobuhisa Itō	Nippon Ishin	Nippon Ishin	
Kinki block	Kazuyoshi Akaba	CRA	CRA	
Kinki block	Mamoru Shigemoto	Liberal Democratic	LDP	
Kinki block	Koichiro Ichimura	Nippon Ishin	Nippon Ishin	
Kinki block	Naomi Tokashiki	Liberal Democratic	LDP	
Kinki block	Hiromasa Nakano	CRA	CRA	
Kinki block	Akinari Kawai	DPFP	DPFP	
Kinki block	Masaru Ishikawa	Sanseitō	Sanseitō	
Kinki block	Kōichi Munekiyo	Liberal Democratic	LDP	
Kinki block	Kōtaro Ikehata	Nippon Ishin	Nippon Ishin	
Kinki block	Kotaro Tatsumi	JCP	JCP	
Kinki block	Keiichiro Kōrai	Liberal Democratic	LDP	
Kinki block	Kanae Yamamoto	CRA	CRA	
Kinki block	Hiroki Sumiyoshi	Nippon Ishin	Nippon Ishin	
Kinki block	Yasuhide Nakayama	Liberal Democratic	LDP	
Kinki block	Kee Miki	Nippon Ishin	Nippon Ishin	
Kinki block	Tomoaki Shimada	Liberal Democratic	LDP	
Kinki block	Shinichi Isa	CRA	CRA	
Kinki block	Kōichi Mukoyama	DPFP	DPFP	
Kinki block	Junpei Higashida	Liberal Democratic	LDP	
Kinki block	Kōichiro Tani	Sanseitō	Sanseitō	
Kinki block	Alex Saito	Nippon Ishin	Nippon Ishin	
Kinki block	Yoji Fujita	Liberal Democratic	LDP	
Kinki block	Yuichiro Ichitani	Nippon Ishin	Nippon Ishin	
Kinki block	Tōru Kunishige	CRA	CRA	
=== Chugoku === 17 single-member and 10 proportional representation seats.
==== Tottori Prefecture ====
Tottori-1st	Shigeru Ishiba	Liberal Democratic	LDP	
Tottori-2nd	Ryosei Akazawa	Liberal Democratic	LDP	
==== Shimane Prefecture ====
Shimane-1st	Emiko Takagai	Liberal Democratic	LDP	
Shimane-2nd	Yasuhiro Takami	Liberal Democratic	LDP	
==== Okayama Prefecture ====
Okayama-1st	Ichiro Aisawa	Liberal Democratic	LDP	
Okayama-2nd	Takashi Yamashita	Liberal Democratic	LDP	
Okayama-3rd	Katsunobu Katō	Liberal Democratic	LDP	
Okayama-4th	Gaku Hashimoto	Liberal Democratic	LDP	
==== Hiroshima Prefecture ====
Hiroshima-1st	Fumio Kishida	Liberal Democratic	LDP	
Hiroshima-2nd	Hiroshi Hiraguchi	Liberal Democratic	LDP	
Hiroshima-3rd	Rintaro Ishibashi	Liberal Democratic	LDP	
Hiroshima-4th	Masayoshi Shintani	Liberal Democratic	LDP	
Hiroshima-5th	Shin Yamamoto	Liberal Democratic	LDP	
Hiroshima-6th	Fumiaki Kobayashi	Liberal Democratic	LDP	
==== Yamaguchi Prefecture ====
Yamaguchi-1st	Masahiro Kōmura	Liberal Democratic	LDP	
Yamaguchi-2nd	Nobuchiyo Kishi	Liberal Democratic	LDP	
Yamaguchi-3rd	Yoshimasa Hayashi	Liberal Democratic	LDP	
==== Chugoku Block ====
Chūgoku block	Minoru Terada	Liberal Democratic	LDP	
Chūgoku block	Shojiro Hiranuma	Liberal Democratic	LDP	
Chūgoku block	Tetsuo Saito	CRA	CRA	
Chūgoku block	Shinji Yoshida	Liberal Democratic	LDP	
Chūgoku block	Toshiko Abe	Liberal Democratic	LDP	
Chūgoku block	Akira Hirabayashi	CRA	CRA	
Chūgoku block	Seri Nabeshima	DPFP	DPFP	
Chūgoku block	Yūji Tawarada	Liberal Democratic	LDP	
Chūgoku block	Kaoru Shimamura	Sanseitō	Sanseitō	
Chūgoku block	Yoshinori Kita	Nippon Ishin	Nippon Ishin	
=== Shikoku === 10 single-member and 6 proportional representation seats.
==== Tokushima Prefecture ====
Tokushima-1st	Hirobumi Niki	Liberal Democratic	LDP	
Tokushima-2nd	Shunichi Yamaguchi	Liberal Democratic	LDP	
==== Kagawa Prefecture ====
Kagawa-1st	Junya Ogawa	CRA	CRA	
Kagawa-2nd	Yuichiro Tamaki	DPFP	DPFP	
Kagawa-3rd	Keitaro Ohno	Liberal Democratic	LDP	
==== Ehime Prefecture ====
Ehime-1st	Akihisa Shiozaki	Liberal Democratic	LDP	
Ehime-2nd	Takumi Ihara	Liberal Democratic	LDP	
Ehime-3rd	Junji Hasegawa	Liberal Democratic	LDP	
==== Kochi Prefecture ====
Kochi-1st	Gen Nakatani	Liberal Democratic	LDP	
Kochi-2nd	Masanao Ozaki	Liberal Democratic	LDP	
==== Shikoku Block ====
Shikoku block	Takuya Hirai	Liberal Democratic	LDP	
Shikoku block	Takakazu Seto	Liberal Democratic	LDP	
Shikoku block	Masayasu Yamasaki	CRA	CRA	
Shikoku block	Seiichiro Murakami	Liberal Democratic	LDP	
Shikoku block	Kamon Iizumi	DPFP	DPFP	
Shikoku block	Norihiro Nakayama	Liberal Democratic	LDP	
=== Kyushu === 34 single-member and 20 proportional representation seats.
==== Fukuoka Prefecture ====
Fukuoka-1st	Takahiro Inoue	Liberal Democratic	LDP	
Fukuoka-2nd	Makoto Oniki	Liberal Democratic	LDP	
Fukuoka-3rd	Atsushi Koga	Liberal Democratic	LDP	
Fukuoka-4th	Hideki Miyauchi	Liberal Democratic	LDP	
Fukuoka-5th	Wataru Kurihara	Liberal Democratic	LDP	
Fukuoka-6th	Jiro Hatoyama	Liberal Democratic	LDP	
Fukuoka-7th	Satoshi Fujimaru	Liberal Democratic	LDP	
Fukuoka-8th	Tarō Asō	Liberal Democratic	LDP	
Fukuoka-9th	Rintaro Ogata	Independent	Independent	
Fukuoka-10th	Haruka Yoshimura	Liberal Democratic	LDP	
Fukuoka-11th	Ryota Takeda	Liberal Democratic	LDP	
==== Saga Prefecture ====
Saga-1st	Kazuchika Iwata	Liberal Democratic	LDP	
Saga-2nd	Yasushi Furukawa	Liberal Democratic	LDP	
==== Nagasaki Prefecture ====
Nagasaki-1st	Hideko Nishioka	DPFP	DPFP	
Nagasaki-2nd	Ryusho Kato	Liberal Democratic	LDP	
Nagasaki-3rd	Yozo Kaneko	Liberal Democratic	LDP	
==== Kumamoto Prefecture ====
Kumamoto-1st	Minoru Kihara	Liberal Democratic	LDP	
Kumamoto-2nd	Daisuke Nishino	Liberal Democratic	LDP	
Kumamoto-3rd	Tetsushi Sakamoto	Liberal Democratic	LDP	
Kumamoto-4th	Yasushi Kaneko	Liberal Democratic	LDP	
==== Oita Prefecture ====
Ōita-1st	Hiroaki Etō	Liberal Democratic	LDP	
Ōita-2nd	Ken Hirose	Liberal Democratic	LDP	
Ōita-3rd	Takeshi Iwaya	Liberal Democratic	LDP	
==== Miyazaki Prefecture ====
Miyazaki-1st	Sō Watanabe	CRA	CRA	
Miyazaki-2nd	Shinji Nagatomo	DPFP	DPFP	
Miyazaki-3rd	Yoshihisa Furukawa	Liberal Democratic	LDP	
==== Kagoshima Prefecture ====
Kagoshima-1st	Takuma Miyaji	Liberal Democratic	LDP	
Kagoshima-2nd	Satoshi Mitazono	Liberal Democratic	LDP	
Kagoshima-3rd	Takeshi Noma	CRA	CRA	
Kagoshima-4th	Hiroshi Moriyama	Liberal Democratic	LDP	
==== Okinawa Prefecture ====
Okinawa-1st	Konosuke Kokuba	Liberal Democratic	LDP	
Okinawa-2nd	Masahisa Miyazaki	Liberal Democratic	LDP	
Okinawa-3rd	Aiko Shimajiri	Liberal Democratic	LDP	
Okinawa-4th	Kozaburo Nishime	Liberal Democratic	LDP	
==== Kyushu Block ====
Kyūshū block	Yasuhiro Ozato	Liberal Democratic	LDP	
Kyūshū block	Taku Etō	Liberal Democratic	LDP	
Kyūshū block	Masakazu Hamachi	CRA	CRA	
Kyūshū block	Shunsuke Takei	Liberal Democratic	LDP	
Kyūshū block	Asato Mihara	Liberal Democratic	LDP	
Kyūshū block	Nobuhiro Yoshida	CRA	CRA	
Kyūshū block	Toshiyuki Kinoshita	Sanseitō	Sanseitō	
Kyūshū block	Ryotaro Konomi	DPFP	DPFP	
Kyūshū block	Masumi Asada	Liberal Democratic	LDP	
Kyūshū block	Hiroshi Ueno	Liberal Democratic	LDP	
Kyūshū block	Yasukuni Kinjo	CRA	CRA	
Kyūshū block	Aoi Furukawa	Team Mirai	Team Mirai	
Kyūshū block	Tomonobu Murakami	Nippon Ishin	Nippon Ishin	
Kyūshū block	Hirotake Yasuoka	Liberal Democratic	LDP	
Kyūshū block	Hiroki Abe	Liberal Democratic	LDP	
Kyūshū block	Yoshihiro Kawano	CRA	CRA	
Kyūshū block	Aki Shirasaka	Liberal Democratic	LDP	
Kyūshū block	Shunichi Makino	Sanseitō	Sanseitō	
Kyūshū block	Masahiko Kondō	DPFP	DPFP	
Kyūshū block	Masami Kawano	Liberal Democratic	LDP	

== Senate ==
=== Composition ===
Composition of the Senate of the National Diet of Japan (as of 9 October 2026, 222th National Diet)
Caucus (English name) (Japanese name)	Parties	Members						
Caucus (English name) (Japanese name)	Parties	Term						Total
Caucus (English name) (Japanese name)	Parties	26 July 2022 – 25 July 2028 (elected 2022, up 2028)			29 July 2025 – 28 July 2031 (elected 2025, up 2031)			Total
Caucus (English name) (Japanese name)	Parties	PR	SNTV/FPTP	Subtotal	PR	SNTV/FPTP	Subtotal	Total
Government								120
Liberal Democratic Party and Group of Independents; Jiyūminshutō / Mushozoku no Kai	Liberal Democratic Party (LDP); Independent	18	43	61	12	28	40	101
Nippon Ishin (Japan Innovation Party); Nippon Ishin no Kai	Nippon Ishin no Kai	8	4	12	4	3	7	19
Opposition								121
The Constitutional Democratic Party of Japan and Independents; Rikken-minshu / Mushozoku	Constitutional Democratic Party (CDP); Independents	7	10	17	7	15	22	39
Democratic Party For the People and The Shin-Ryokufukai; Kokumin-minshutō / Shin-Ryokufūkai	Democratic Party For the People (DPFP)	3	4	7	7	11	18	25
Komeito; Kōmeitō	Komeito	6	7	13	4	4	8	21
Sanseito; Sanseitō	Sanseitō	1	0	1	7	7	14	15
Japanese Communist Party; Nihon Kyōsantō	Japanese Communist Party (JCP)	3	1	4	2	1	3	7
Party of Life; Inochi no Tō	Party of Life	2	0	2	3	0	3	5
Conservative Party of Japan; Nihon Hoshutō	Conservative Party of Japan	0	0	0	2	0	2	2
Okinawa Whirlwind; Okinawa no Kaze	Independents	0	1	1	0	1	1	2
Team Mirai and the Independent; Chīmu Mirai / Mushozoku no Kai	Team Mirai; Independent	0	0	0	1	1	2	2
Social Democratic Party; Shakai Minshutō	Social Democratic Party (SDP)	1	0	1	1	0	1	2
Unaffiliated		1	3	4	0	3	3	7
Independents; Members not affiliated with any parliamentary caucus	LDP 1 (President); CDP 1 (Vice President); Independents	1	3	4	0	3	3	7
Total		50	73	123	50	74	124	247
Vacant: one constituency seat in Tokyo (2028 class), vacant since the resignation of former Reiwa Shinsengumi leader, Taro Yamamoto, on 21 January 2026 (no by-election held per Public Offices Election Act; threshold of one-quarter of district seats not met)	N/A	0	1	1	0	0	0	1

List of members by parliamentary group and constituency:

- Liberal Democratic Party and Group of Independents (LDP-GI)
- The Constitutional Democratic Party of Japan and the Independent (CDP)
- Democratic Party For the People and The Shin-Ryokufukai (DPFP-SR)
- Komeito (KP)
- Nippon Ishin (Japan Innovation Party) (JIP)
- Sanseito (SAN)
- Japanese Communist Party (JCP)
- Reiwa Shinsengumi (Reiwa)
- Conservative Party of Japan (CPJ)
- Okinawa Whirlwind (OW)
- Team Mirai and the Independent (MIRAI)
- Social Democratic Party (SDP)
- Independents (I)

Notes:

- Not all members of a caucus are also members of the affiliated party, and sometimes even some members of a party are not member of the affiliated caucus.

=== Members ===
Members of the Senate (as of February 16, 2026)
Name	Caucus	Electoral district	End of term
Masashi Adachi	LDP-GI	Proportional	2028
Yasushi Adachi	DPFP-SR	Proportional	2031
Yuji Adachi	SAN	Proportional	2031
Ken Akamatsu	LDP-GI	Proportional	2028
Kōzō Akino	KP	Fukuoka	2028
Hiroshi Ando	SAN	Proportional	2031
Takahiro Anno	MIRAI	Proportional	2031
Ai Aoki	CDP	Proportional	2028
Kazuhiko Aoki	LDP-GI	Tottori-Shimane	2028
Kenta Aoshima	JIP	Proportional	2028
Haruko Arimura	LDP-GI	Proportional	2031
Hitoshi Asada	JIP	Osaka	2028
Kentarō Asahi	LDP-GI	Tokyo	2028
Keiichiro Asao	LDP-GI	Kanagawa	2028
Seishi Baba	LDP-GI	Kumamoto	2031
Mikishi Daimon	JCP	Proportional	2028
Momoko Degawa	LDP-GI	Tottori-Shimane	2031
Makiko Dōgomi	DPFP-SR	Ibaraki	2028
Kumiko Ehara	DPFP-SR	Saitama	2031
Kiyoshi Ejima	LDP-GI	Yamaguchi	2028
Kazuhiro Fujii	LDP-GI	Proportional	2028
Masahito Fujikawa	LDP-GI	Aichi	2028
Shinya Fujiki	LDP-GI	Proportional	2028
Takamaro Fukuoka	LDP-GI	Saga	2028
Masumi Fukushi	CDP	Aomori	2031
Mizuho Fukushima	SDP	Proportional	2028
Mamoru Fukuyama	LDP-GI	Proportional	2031
Tetsuro Fukuyama	I	Kyoto	2028
Toshimitsu Funahashi	LDP-GI	Hokkaido	2028
Yasue Funayama	DPFP-SR	Yamagata	2028
Toshiharu Furukawa	LDP-GI	Saitama	2031
Hitoshi Goto	DPFP-SR	Yamanashi	2031
Shota Goto	SAN	Proportional	2031
Michiya Haga	DPFP-SR	Yamagata	2031
Hiroki Hajikano	SAN	Kanagawa	2031
Makoto Hamaguchi	DPFP-SR	Proportional	2028
Yoshifumi Hamano	DPFP-SR	Proportional	2031
Daijiro Harada	KP	Proportional	2031
Hidekazu Harada	DPFP-SR	Kagawa	2031
Gaku Hasegawa	LDP-GI	Hokkaido	2028
Hideharu Hasegawa	LDP-GI	Proportional	2028
Seiko Hashimoto	LDP-GI	Proportional	2031
Jiro Hata	CDP	Nagano	2031
Hideki Higashino	LDP-GI	Proportional	2031
Kota Hirado	DPFP-SR	Proportional	2031
Daisaku Hiraki	KP	Proportional	2031
Sachiko Hirayama	I	Shizuoka	2028
Hajime Hirota	CDP	Tokushima-Kōchi	2031
Akiko Honda	LDP-GI	Proportional	2031
Iwao Horii	LDP-GI	Nara	2031
Hokuto Hoshi	LDP-GI	Fukushima	2028
Naoki Hyakuta	CPJ	Proportional	2031
Yōichi Iha	OW	Okinawa	2028
Akiko Ikuina	LDP-GI	Tokyo	2028
Eriko Imai	LDP-GI	Proportional	2028
Shūsaku Indō	LDP-GI	Proportional	2031
Kuniko Inoguchi	LDP-GI	Chiba	2028
Naoki Inose	JIP	Proportional	2028
Yoshiyuki Inoue	LDP-GI	Proportional	2028
Kenji Isezaki	Reiwa	Proportional	2031
Michihiro Ishibashi	CDP	Proportional	2028
Masahiro Ishida	LDP-GI	Proportional	2031
Noriko Ishigaki	CDP	Miyagi	2031
Hiroo Ishii	LDP-GI	Akita	2028
Jun'ichi Ishii	LDP-GI	Chiba	2031
Megumi Ishii	JIP	Proportional	2031
Mitsuko Ishii	JIP	Proportional	2028
Hirotaka Ishikawa	KP	Osaka	2028
Tetsuji Isozaki	DPFP-SR	Proportional	2031
Yoshihiko Isozaki	LDP-GI	Kagawa	2028
Takae Itō	DPFP-SR	Aichi	2028
Takae Itō	KP	Hyogo	2028
Tatsuo Itoh	DPFP-SR	Proportional	2031
Tomo Iwabuchi	JCP	Proportional	2028
Mana Iwamoto	SAN	Proportional	2031
Tsuyohito Iwamoto	LDP-GI	Hokkaido	2031
Fusaho Izumi	CDP	Hyogo	2031
Hanako Jimi	LDP-GI	Proportional	2028
Hiroyuki Kada	LDP-GI	Hyogo	2031
Yukiko Kada	JIP	Proportional	2031
Akihiro Kagoshima	DPFP-SR	Kanagawa	2031
Daisuke Kajihara	LDP-GI	Proportional	2028
Satoshi Kamayachi	LDP-GI	Proportional	2031
Masayuki Kamiya	LDP-GI	Proportional	2028
Sohei Kamiya	SAN	Proportional	2028
Michihito Kaneko	JIP	Proportional	2028
Daisuke Katayama	JIP	Hyogo	2028
Satsuki Katayama	LDP-GI	Proportional	2028
Akiyoshi Kato	LDP-GI	Ibaraki	2028
Kenji Katsube	CDP	Hokkaido	2031
Takanori Kawai	DPFP-SR	Proportional	2028
Yudai Kawamura	KP	Tokyo	2031
Shigenori Kenzaka	LDP-GI	Proportional	2031
Eiji Kidoguchi	CDP	Iwate	2028
Eiko Kimura	Reiwa	Proportional	2031
Yoshio Kimura	LDP-GI	Proportional	2028
Yoshiko Kira	JCP	Tokyo	2031
Makiko Kishi	CDP	Proportional	2031
Haruo Kitamura	CPJ	Proportional	2031
Tsuneo Kitamura	LDP-GI	Yamaguchi	2031
Kazuhiro Kobayashi	LDP-GI	Niigata	2028
Koichiro Kobayashi	LDP-GI	Okayama	2031
Sayaka Kobayashi	DPFP-SR	Chiba	2031
Chikage Koga	CDP	Proportional	2028
Yuichiro Koga	LDP-GI	Nagasaki	2031
Yukihito Koga	CDP	Fukuoka	2028
Akira Koike	JCP	Proportional	2031
Tomoko Kojima	CDP	Mie	2031
Hiroyuki Konishi	CDP	Chiba	2028
Ryo Kōriyama	CDP	Proportional	2031
Harutomo Kosho	LDP-GI	Ōita	2028
Takashi Koyari	LDP-GI	Shiga	2028
Ryōsuke Kōzuki	LDP-GI	Ibaraki	2031
Tetsuya Kubota	KP	Proportional	2028
Hiroto Kumagai	CDP	Saitama	2031
Seiichi Kushida	JIP	Proportional	2028
Shōji Maitachi	LDP-GI	Proportional	2031
Takao Makino	LDP-GI	Shizuoka	2031
Hiroe Makiyama	CDP	Kanagawa	2031
Manabu Matsuda	SAN	Proportional	2031
Rui Matsukawa	LDP-GI	Osaka	2028
Yoshifumi Matsumura	LDP-GI	Kumamoto	2028
Akemi Matsuno	JIP	Proportional	2028
Shinpei Matsushita	LDP-GI	Miyazaki	2028
Masaji Matsuyama	LDP-GI	Fukuoka	2031
Shigefumi Matsuzawa	JIP	Kanagawa	2028
Junko Mihara	LDP-GI	Kanagawa	2028
Eri Mikami	CDP	Hiroshima	2028
Nobuhiro Miura	KP	Kanagawa	2028
Chisato Miyade	SAN	Osaka	2031
Kazuhiro Miyamoto	LDP-GI	Shiga	2031
Shuji Miyamoto	LDP-GI	Ishikawa	2031
Masaru Miyazaki	KP	Proportional	2028
Yoichi Miyazawa	LDP-GI	Hiroshima	2028
Koichi Mizuno	DPFP-SR	Aichi	2031
Shunichi Mizuoka	CDP	Proportional	2031
Yoshio Mochizuki	I	Wakayama	2031
Masako Mori	LDP-GI	Fukushima	2031
Yuko Mori	CDP	Proportional	2031
Shinji Morimoto	CDP	Hiroshima	2031
Kyoko Murata	CDP	Proportional	2028
Takako Nagae	I	Ehime	2031
Hiroyuki Nagahama	CDP	Chiba	2031
Manabu Nagai	LDP-GI	Yamanashi	2028
Yuko Nakada	SAN	Fukuoka	2031
Kiyoshi Nakajo	JIP	Proportional	2028
Yūsuke Nakanishi	LDP-GI	Tokushima-Kōchi	2028
Hirofumi Nakasone	LDP-GI	Gunma	2028
Sohei Nihi	JCP	Proportional	2028
Shohei Niimi	JIP	Kyoto	2031
Makoto Nishida	KP	Saitama	2028
Shoji Nishida	LDP-GI	Kyoto	2031
Hidenori Nishita	LDP-GI	Hiroshima	2031
Yukie Niwata	DPFP-SR	Toyama	2031
Kōtarō Nogami	LDP-GI	Toyama	2028
Tetsuro Nomura	LDP-GI	Kagoshima	2028
Toshiyuki Ochi	LDP-GI	Proportional	2028
Katsumi Ogawa	LDP-GI	Proportional	2028
Tsutomu Ōtsu	SAN	Saitama	2031
Satoshi Ōie	LDP-GI	Fukuoka	2028
Naoki Okada	LDP-GI	Ishikawa	2028
Futoshi Okazaki	JIP	Osaka	2031
Fumiyo Okuda	Reiwa	Proportional	2031
Yoshihiro Okumura	DPFP-SR	Tokyo	2031
Makoto Oniki	CDP	Proportional	2028
Kimi Onoda	LDP-GI	Okayama	2028
Kusuo Oshima	Reiwa	Proportional	2028
Tomomi Otsuji	MIRAI	Kagoshima	2031
Masahito Ozawa	CDP	Proportional	2031
Ishii LaSalle	SDP	Proportional	2031
Renhō Saitō	CDP	Proportional	2031
Ken'ichirō Saitō	I	Proportional	2028
Yoshitaka Saitō	CDP	Aichi	2028
Yasuyuki Sakai	LDP-GI	Aichi	2031
Mitsuru Sakurai	LDP-GI	Miyagi	2028
Shoko Sakurai	SAN	Ibaraki	2031
Masafumi Sasaki	KP	Proportional	2031
Rie Sasaki	JIP	Osaka	2031
Kei Satō	LDP-GI	Nara	2028
Ryūji Satomi	KP	Aichi	2028
Hei Seki	JIP	Proportional	2031
Masakazu Sekiguchi	I	Saitama	2028
Shinichi Shiba	CDP	Proportional	2028
Takumi Shibata	JIP	Proportional	2031
Kazuya Shimba	DPFP-SR	Shizuoka	2031
Masato Shimizu	LDP-GI	Gunma	2031
Rokuta Shimono	KP	Fukuoka	2031
Kanehiko Shindo	LDP-GI	Proportional	2028
Sayaka Shioiri	SAN	Tokyo	2031
Ayaka Shiomura	CDP	Tokyo	2028
Yōko Shirakawa	JCP	Proportional	2031
Shinsuke Suematsu	LDP-GI	Hyogo	2028
Hisatake Sugi	KP	Osaka	2031
Junko Sugimoto	SAN	Aichi	2031
Hideya Sugio	CDP	Nagano	2028
Daichi Suzuki	LDP-GI	Tokyo	2031
Muneo Suzuki	LDP-GI	Proportional	2031
Maiko Tajima	CDP	Aichi	2031
Kaori Takagi	JIP	Osaka	2028
Mari Takagi	CDP	Saitama	2028
Harumi Takahashi	LDP-GI	Hokkaido	2031
Katsunori Takahashi	LDP-GI	Tochigi	2031
Mitsuo Takahashi	KP	Hyogo	2031
Sachika Takara	OW	Okinawa	2031
Shinji Takeuchi	KP	Proportional	2028
Toshiko Takeya	KP	Tokyo	2028
Hitoshi Takezume	DPFP-SR	Proportional	2028
Hirofumi Takinami	LDP-GI	Fukui	2031
Mami Tamura	DPFP-SR	Proportional	2031
Masayo Tanabu	CDP	Aomori	2028
Masaaki Taniai	KP	Proportional	2028
Daisuke Tenbata	Reiwa	Proportional	2028
Shizuka Terata	LDP-GI	Akita	2031
Eri Tokunaga	CDP	Hokkaido	2028
Rio Tomonō	LDP-GI	Proportional	2028
Kiyomi Tsujimoto	CDP	Proportional	2028
Takashi Tsukasa	KP	Proportional	2031
Yōsuke Tsuruho	LDP-GI	Wakayama	2028
Sakura Uchikoshi	CDP	Niigata	2031
Isamu Ueda	KP	Proportional	2028
Kiyoshi Ueda	DPFP-SR	Saitama	2028
Hotaru Ueno	JIP	Proportional	2028
Michiko Ueno	LDP-GI	Tochigi	2028
Mizuho Umemura	SAN	Proportional	2031
Mayu Ushida	DPFP-SR	Tokyo	2031
Shoichi Usui	LDP-GI	Chiba	2028
Yohei Wakabayashi	LDP-GI	Shizuoka	2028
Atsuko Wakai	LDP-GI	Gifu	2031
Masaaki Waki	LDP-GI	Kanagawa	2031
Takeyuki Watanabe	LDP-GI	Gifu	2028
Hiroshi Yamada	LDP-GI	Proportional	2028
Taro Yamada	LDP-GI	Proportional	2031
Yoshihiko Yamada	DPFP-SR	Proportional	2031
Junzo Yamamoto	LDP-GI	Ehime	2028
Keisuke Yamamoto	LDP-GI	Nagasaki	2028
Sachiko Yamamoto	LDP-GI	Mie	2028
Sen Yamanaka	SAN	Proportional	2031
Yūhei Yamashita	LDP-GI	Saga	2031
Eriko Yamatani	LDP-GI	Proportional	2028
Kanako Yamauchi	CDP	Miyazaki	2031
Masaaki Yamazaki	LDP-GI	Fukui	2028
Taku Yamazoe	JCP	Tokyo	2028
Takanori Yokosawa	CDP	Iwate	2031
Shinichi Yokoyama	KP	Proportional	2028
Tadatomo Yoshida	CDP	Ōita	2031
Akira Yoshii	LDP-GI	Kyoto	2028
Saori Yoshikawa	CDP	Proportional	2031
