= 2016 Japanese House of Councillors election =

- 10 July 2016

121 of the 242 seats in the House of Councillors 122 seats needed for a majority
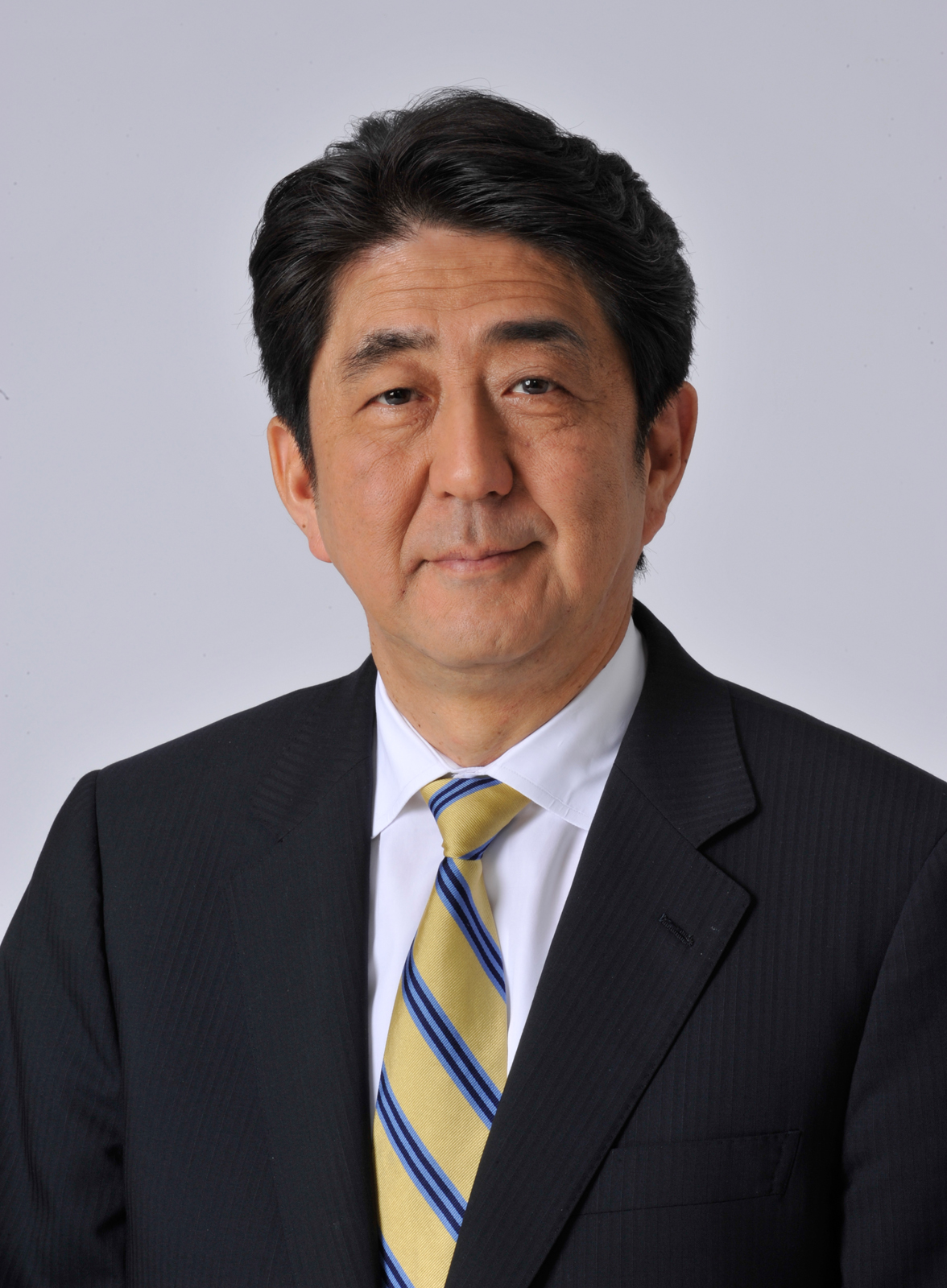

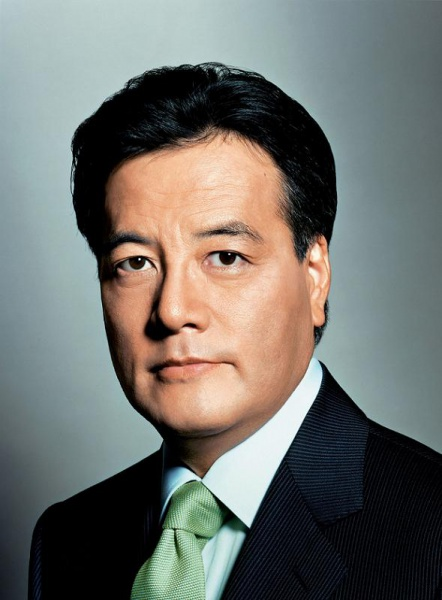

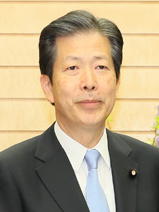

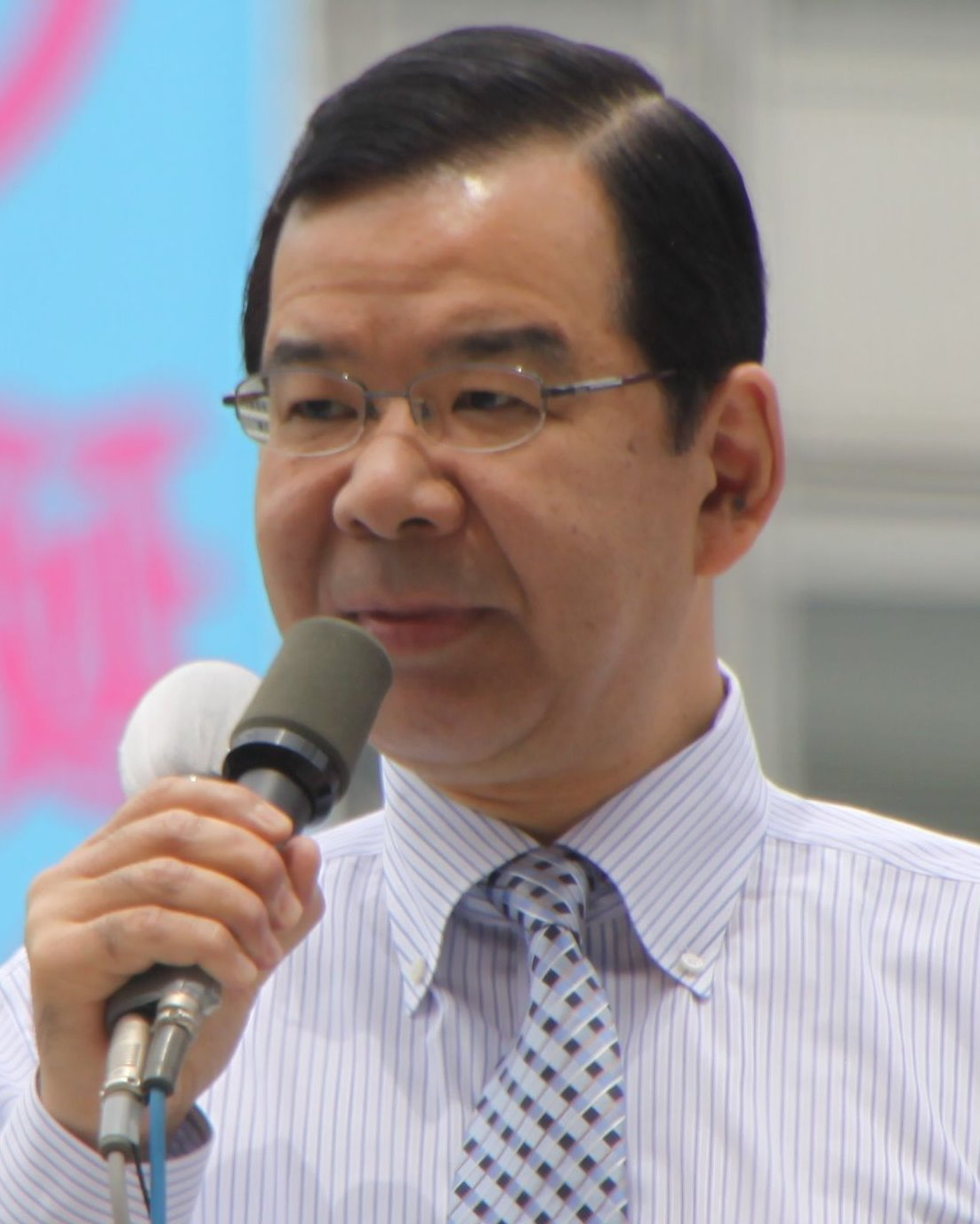

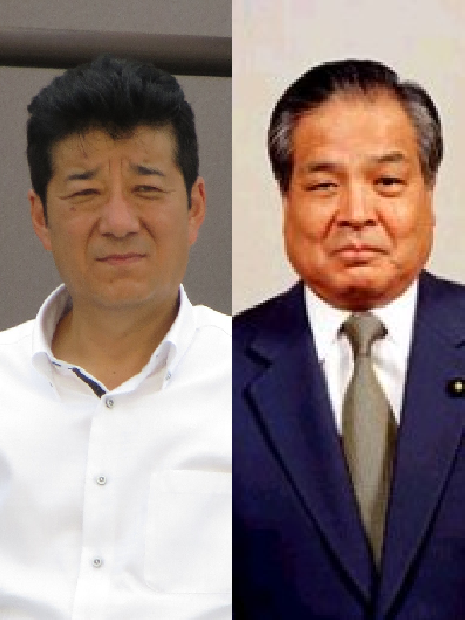
	First party	Second party	Third party
Leader	Shinzō Abe	Katsuya Okada	Natsuo Yamaguchi
Party	LDP	Democratic	Komeito
Last election	115 seats	68 (Note: Democratic Party of Japan and Japan Restoration Party.)	20 seats
Seats won	55	32	14
Seats after	121	49	25
Seat change	▲6	▼19	▲5
Constituency vote	22,590,793	14,215,956	4,263,422
% and swing	39.94% (▼2.80pp)	25.14% (▲1.60pp)	7.54% (▲2.41pp)
National vote	20,114,788	11,751,015	7,572,960
% and swing	35.91% (▼1.23pp)	20.98% (▼4.36pp)	13.52% (▼0.70pp)
	Fourth party	Fifth party
Leader	Kazuo Shii	Ichiro Matsui; Toranosuke Katayama
Party	JCP	Ishin
Last election	11 seats	Did not exist
Seats won	6	7
Seats after	14	12
Seat change	▲3	New
Constituency vote	4,103,514	3,303,419
% and swing	7.26% (▼3.38pp)	5.84% (New)
National vote	6,016,195	5,153,584
% and swing	10.74% (▲1.06pp)	9.20% (New)
- Constituency and proportional representation results
President of the House of Councillors before election
Masaaki Yamazaki
LDP
Elected President of the House of Councillors
Chūichi Date
LDP

House of Councillors elections were held in Japan on Sunday 10 July 2016 to elect 121 of the 242 members of the upper house of the National Diet, for a term of six years. As a result of the election, the Liberal Democratic Party–Komeito coalition gained ten seats for a total of 145 (60% of all seats in the house), the largest coalition achieved since the size of the house was set at 242 seats.

76 members were elected by single non-transferable vote (SNTV) and first-past-the-post (FPTP) voting in 45 multi- and single-member prefectural electoral districts; for the first time, there were two combined (gōku) single-member districts consisting of two prefectures each, Tottori-Shimane and Tokushima-Kōchi. This change and several other reapportionments were part of an electoral reform law passed by the Diet in July 2015 designed to reduce the maximum ratio of malapportionment in the House of Councillors below 3. The nationwide district which elects 48 members by D'Hondt proportional representation with most open lists remained unchanged.

The elections were the first national election after the 2015 change to the Public Offices Election Act, which allowed people from 18 years of age to vote in national, prefectural and municipal elections and in referendums. The legal voting age prior to the change was 20.

== Background ==
The term of members elected in the 2010 regular election (including those elected in subsequent by-elections or as runners-up) ends on July 25, 2016. Under the "Public Offices Election Act" (kōshoku-senkyo-hō), the regular election must be held within 30 days before that date, or under certain conditions if the Diet is in session or scheduled to open at that time, between 24 and 30 days after the closure of the session and thus potentially somewhat after the actual end of term. The election date was July 10 with the deadline for nominations and the start of legal campaigning 18 days before the election (i.e. June 22).

Prior to the election, the Liberal Democratic Party and its coalition partner Komeito controlled a two-thirds super-majority of seats in the House of Representatives but did not control a similar super-majority of seats in the House of Councillors, necessary to initiate amendments of the Constitution of Japan. In order to deny a super-majority to the LDP and other pro-amendment parties, the parties opposed to amending the constitution (Democratic Party, Japanese Communist Party, Social Democratic Party and People's Life Party) agreed to field a single candidate in each single-seat district, leading to a number of one-on-one races between the LDP and an opposition candidate (most of which the LDP ultimately won). Prime Minister Shinzo Abe, historically a vocal proponent of constitutional revision, generally avoided discussing the constitution during the campaign, instead focusing on his "Abenomics" economic policies.

On the eve of the election, Gerald Curtis described the race as "one of the dullest in recent memory", pointing out that "never in Japan's postwar history has the political opposition been as enfeebled as it is now... That's why widespread public disappointment with the government's economic policies hasn't hurt Mr. Abe politically. The prevailing sentiment is that he has done better than his predecessors, and replacing him with another LDP leader, let alone an opposition coalition government, would only make matters worse—especially now that the global economy is in turmoil."

=== Pre-election composition ===
As of the official announcement (kōji, the candidate registration deadline and when the campaign starts) on 22 June (count by Yomiuri Shimbun):

↓
37	59	8	2	1	9	50	11	65
O not up	Main opposition seats up	RO	RO up	V	K up	LDP seats up	K	LDP seats not up

In the class of members facing re-election, the ruling coalition of the Liberal Democratic Party (LDP) and Kōmeitō had a combined 60 of 121 seats, slightly short of a majority (as of June 2016). The main opposition Democratic Party held 47 seats. As the coalition held 77 seats not being contested at this election, they only needed to retain 44 seats in the election to maintain their majority in the House. The LDP, which held 117 seats alone, had to gain five seats to reach a majority of its own and make the coalition with Kōmeitō unnecessary. In the other direction, the governing coalition would have to lose 16 seats or more to forfeit its overall majority in the House of Councillors and face a technically divided Diet. However, as independents and minor opposition groups might be willing to support the government on a regular basis without inclusion in the cabinet, the losses required to face an actual divided Diet may have been much higher. If the Diet were divided after the election, the coalition's two-thirds majority in the House of Representatives could still override the House of Councillors and pass legislation, but certain Diet decisions, notably the approval of certain nominations by the cabinet such as public safety commission members or Bank of Japan governor, would require the cooperation of at least part of the opposition or an expansion of the ruling coalition.

Among the members facing re-election were House of Councillors President Masaaki Yamazaki (LDP, Fukui), Vice President Azuma Koshiishi (DPJ, Yamanashi), Justice Minister Mitsuhide Iwaki (LDP, Fukushima) and Okinawa and Science Minister Aiko Shimajiri (LDP, Okinawa).

== Policy effects ==
The election gave a two-thirds super-majority in the upper house to the four parties in favor of constitutional revision. After the election, Abe publicly acknowledged that constitutional revision would be "not so easy" and said "I expect the discussion will be deepened." The Chinese government voiced concern about the result, while South Korean newspaper Munhwa Ilbo opined that the election results "opened the door for a Japan that can go to war."

Abe announced a major economic stimulus package following the election, leading to a spike in the Japanese stock markets.

== District reapportionment ==
The following districts saw a change in their representation within the House at this election. One set of reforms was introduced in 2012 and first took effect at the 2013 election; the districts affected by the 2015 reforms are shaded.

District	Magnitude	Notes
Hokkaidō	3	Increased from 2
Miyagi	1	Decreased from 2
Fukushima	1	2 incumbents in outgoing class (reapportioned in 2012)
Tokyo	6	Increased from 5
Kanagawa	4	3 incumbents in outgoing class (reapportioned in 2012)
Niigata	1	Decreased from 2
Nagano	1	Decreased from 2
Gifu	1	2 incumbents in outgoing class (reapportioned in 2012)
Aichi	4	Increased from 3
Osaka	4	3 incumbents in outgoing class (reapportioned in 2012)
Hyogo	3	Increased from 2
Tottori-Shimane	1	Created from the merger of the single-member Tottori and Shimane districts
Tokushima-Kōchi	1	Created from the merger of the single-member Tokushima and Kochi districts
Fukuoka	3	Increased from 2

== Opinion polls ==
=== Seat projections ===
Date	by	Ruling Coalition		Ruling Coal. total	Opposition									Source
Date	by	LDP	KM	Ruling Coal. total	DP	JCP	IFO	SDP	PLP	PJK	NRP	Oth.	Ind.	Source
5–6 July	Asahi	56	14	70	30	7	8	1	0	0	0	0	5	
3–5 July	Kyodo & Tokyo	58	14	72	27	10	6	1	0	0	0	0	5	
3–5 July	Kyodo	60	14	74	27	9	6	1	0	0	0	0	4	
3–5 July	Nikkei	49–65	10–15	59–80	19–38	7–15	4–8	0–1	0–1	0	0	2–7		
3–5 July	Yomiuri	-	-	-	-	-	-	-	-	-	-	-	-	
1–3 July	Sankei & FNN	59	12	71	28	10	7	1	0	0	0	0	4	
1–3 July	Dwango & Line	55	14	69	27	10	8	1	1	0	0	0	5	
1–3 July	Jiji	-	-	-	-	-	-	-	-	-	-	-	-	
22 June – 3 July	Yahoo!	61	10	71	26	11	8	5						
22–23 June	Asahi	57	14	71	30	8	7	1	0	0	0	0	4	
22–23 June	Mainichi	58–65	12–14	70–79	22–31	7–12	5–8	0–1	0	0	0	0	2–3	
22–23 June	Kyodo	-	-	-	-	-	-	-	-	-	-	-	-	
22–23 June	Nikkei	-	-	-	-	-	-	-	-	-	-	-	-	
22–23 June	Yomiuri	-	-	-	-	-	-	-	-	-	-	-	-	
4–21 June	Yahoo!	57	11	68	24	16	10	3						
17–19 June	Dwango & Line	57	14	71	25	10	8	1	1	0	0	0	5	

=== Cabinet approval / disapproval ratings ===
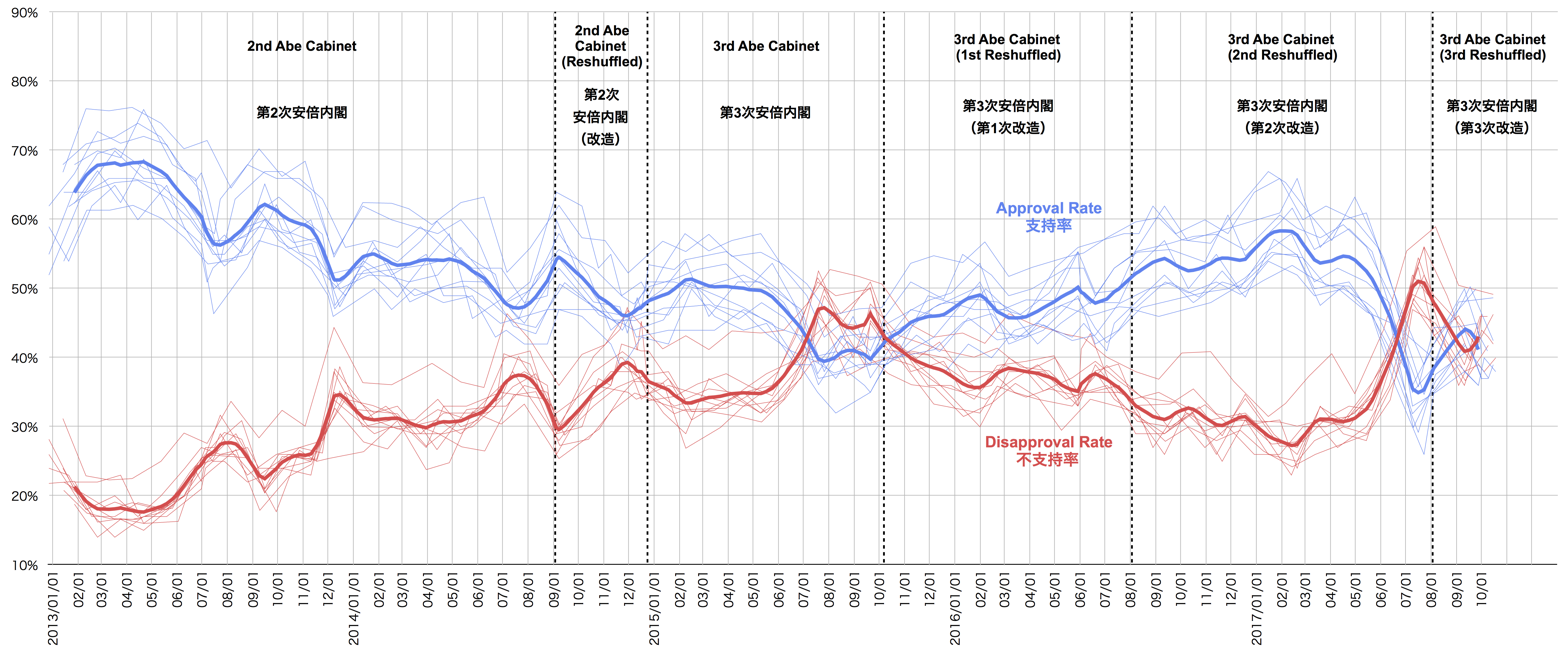
Approval (blue) and Disapproval (red) Ratings for Second and Third Abe Cabinet

== Results ==
A record 28 women won seats in the compared to 26 in 2007 and 22 in 2013. Among them, actress Junko Mihara won a seat representing Kanagawa Prefecture for the LDP.

Yoshimi Watanabe, former leader of Your Party, returned to the Diet in this election, winning a seat as part of Osaka Ishin no Kai. Justice minister Mitsuhide Iwaki lost his seat in Fukushima Prefecture to an opposition-supported candidate. Aiko Shimajiri, state minister for Okinawan affairs, lost her seat to former Ginowan, Okinawa mayor Yoichi Iha, a critic of the US military presence in Okinawa supported by a coalition of opposition parties. This was viewed by some analysts as a setback for the proposed relocation of Marine Corps Air Station Futenma. Former Olympic volleyball player Kentaro Asahi won a seat representing the Tokyo at-large district for the LDP. On the same day, journalist Satoshi Mitazono defeated incumbent Yuichiro Ito in a gubernatorial election in Kagoshima Prefecture. Mitazono campaigned on a platform focused on suspension of the Sendai Nuclear Power Plant.

Party	National			Constituency			Seats			
Party	Votes	%	Seats	Votes	%	Seats	Not up	Won	Total after	+/–
Liberal Democratic Party	20,114,788	35.91	19	22,590,793	39.94	36	65	55	120	+5
Democratic Party	11,751,015	20.98	11	14,215,956	25.14	21	17	32	49	–19
Komeito	7,572,960	13.52	7	4,263,422	7.54	7	11	14	25	+5
Japanese Communist Party	6,016,195	10.74	5	4,103,514	7.26	1	8	6	14	+3
Initiatives from Osaka	5,153,584	9.20	4	3,303,419	5.84	3	5	7	12	New
Social Democratic Party	1,536,239	2.74	1	289,899	0.51	0	1	1	2	–1
People's Life Party	1,067,301	1.91	1				1	1	2	0
Party for Japanese Kokoro	734,024	1.31	0	535,517	0.95	0	3	0	3	New
Shiji Seitō Nashi	647,072	1.16	0	127,367	0.23	0	0	0	0	New
New Renaissance Party	580,653	1.04	0	60,431	0.11	0	0	0	0	–1
Angry Voice of the People	466,706	0.83	0	82,357	0.15	0	0	0	0	New
Happiness Realization Party	366,815	0.65	0	963,585	1.70	0	0	0	0	0
Genzei Nippon				218,171	0.39	0	0	0	0	0
Ishin Seito Shimpu				42,858	0.08	0	0	0	0	0
World Economic Community Party				6,114	0.01	0	0	0	0	0
Katsuko Inumaru and the Republican Party				5,388	0.01	0	0	0	0	New
World Peace Party				3,854	0.01	0	0	0	0	New
Challenged Japan				3,296	0.01	0	0	0	0	New
Assembly to Energize Japan							2	0	2	New
Okinawa Social Mass Party							1	0	1	0
Independents				5,739,452	10.15	5	7	5	12	+9
Total	56,007,352	100.00	48	56,555,393	100.00	73	121	121	242	0
Valid votes	56,007,830	96.43		56,555,393	97.35					
Invalid/blank votes	2,075,189	3.57		1,537,385	2.65					
Total votes	58,083,019	100.00		58,092,778	100.00					
Registered voters/turnout	106,202,873	54.69		106,202,873	54.70					
Source: Ministry of Internal Communications, Yomiuri Shimbun

=== By electoral district ===
Abbreviations and translations used in this table for (nominating – endorsing) parties:

- L – Liberal Democratic Party
- D – Democratic Party
- K – Komeito
- C - Japanese Communist Party
- S – Social Democratic Party
- I – Independent
- Osaka Ishin – Initiatives from Osaka
- PLP – People's Life Party
- Kokoro – Party for Japanese Kokoro
- AEJ – Assembly to Energize Japan
- NRP – New Renaissance Party
- NPD – New Party Daichi
- SSN – Shiji Seitō Nashi
- Angry Voice of the People
- HRP – Happiness Realization Party

District	Magnitude	Incumbents	Winners & runner-up [+incumbents if lower] with vote share (/votes for PR members)	Gains & losses by party
Hokkaidō	3 (+1)	Gaku Hasegawa (L); Eri Tokunaga (D)	Gaku Hasegawa (L – K) 25.5% Eri Tokunaga (D) 22.0% Yoshio Hachiro (D) 19.3% Katsuhiro Kakiki (L – K, NPD) 19.0%	D +1
Aomori	1	Tsutomu Yamazaki (L)	Masayo Tanabu (D – S) 49.2% Tsutomu Yamazaki (L – K) 47.9%	L -1 D +1
Iwate	1	Ryō Shuhama (D)	Eiji Kidoguchi (I – D, C, S, PLP) 53.3% Shin'ichi Tanaka (L – K) 41.0%	D -1 I (opposition) +1
Miyagi	1 (-1)	Yutaka Kumagai (L); Mitsuru Sakurai (D)	Mitsuru Sakurai (D – C, S, PLP) 51.1% Yutaka Kumagai (L – K) 47.0%	L -1
Akita	1	Hiroo Ishii (L)	Hiroo Ishii (L – K) 53.9% Daigo Matsuura (D – C, S) 44.0%	
Yamagata	1	Kōichi Kishi (L)	Yasue Funayama (I – D, S) 59.0% Kaoru Tsukino (L – K) 38.3%	L -1 I (opposition) +1
Fukushima	1 (-1)	Teruhiko Mashiko (D); Mitsuhide Iwaki (L)	Teruhiko Mashiko (D – S) 50.5% Mitsuhide Iwaki (L – K) 47.2%	L -1
Ibaraki	2	Hiroshi Okada (L); Akira Gunji (D)	Hiroshi Okada (L – K) 50.3% Akira Gunji (D) 25.3% Kyōko Kobayashi (C) 9.4%	
Tochigi	1	Michiko Ueno (L)	Michiko Ueno (L – K) 58.9% Takao Tanobe (I – D, C, S, PLP) 38.3%	
Gunma	1	Hirofumi Nakasone (L)	Hirofumi Nakasone (L – K) 66.0% Keinin Horikoshi (D – C, S) 31.1%	
Saitama	3	Masakazu Sekiguchi (L); Makoto Nishida (K); Motohiro Ōno (D)	Masakazu Sekiguchi (L) 29.2% Motohiro Ōno (D – PLP) 22.0% Makoto Nishida (K – L) 20.9% Gaku Itō (C – PLP) 15.8%	
Chiba	3	Hiroyuki Konishi (D); Kuniko Inoguchi (L); Ken'ichi Mizuno (D)	Kuniko Inoguchi (L – K) 29.2% Taichirō Motoe (L – K) 22.1% Hiroyuki Konishi (D) 18.1% Fumiko Asano (C) 13.5% Ken'ichi Mizuno (D) 12.1%	D -1 L +1
Tokyo	6 (+1)	Renhō (D); Toshiko Takeya (K); Masaharu Nakagawa (L); Toshio Ogawa (D); Kōta Matsuda (AEJ)	Renhō (D) 18.0% Masaharu Nakagawa (L) 14.2% Toshiko Takeya (K) 12.4% Taku Yamazoe (C) 10.7% Kentarō Asahi (L) 10.4% Toshio Ogawa (D) 8.2% Yasuo Tanaka (Osaka Ishin) 7.5%... Kazuyuki Hamada (Note: incumbent from Tottori) (I) 0.5%	AEJ -1 L +1 C +1
Kanagawa	4 (+1)	Akio Koizumi (L); Kenji Nakanishi (I); Yōichi Kaneko (D)	Junko Mihara (L) 24.5% Nobuhiro Miura (K – L) 15.3% Yūichi Mayama (D – PLP) 14.2% Kenji Nakanishi (I – L) (Note: retroactively nominated by the LDP on election night) 12.8% Yuka Asaka (C – PLP) 11.9% Yōichi Kaneko (D – PLP) 10.9%	K +1 I (government) joins L
Niigata	1 (-1)	Naoki Tanaka (D); Yaichi Nakahara (L)	Yūko Mori (I – D, C, S, PLP) 49.0% Yaichi Nakahara (L – K) 48.8%	L -1 D -1 I (opposition) +1
Toyama	1	Kōtarō Nogami (L)	Kōtarō Nogami (L – K) 69.2% Etsuko Dōyō (I – D, C, S, PLP) 27.4%	
Ishikawa	1	Naoki Okada (L)	Naoki Okada (L – K) 61.7% Miki Shibata (I – D, C, S, PLP) 36.0%	
Fukui	1	Masaaki Yamazaki (L)	Masaaki Yamazaki (L – K) 60.1% Tatsuhiro Yokoyama (I – D, S) 36.3%	
Yamanashi	1	Azuma Koshiishi (D)	Yuka Miyazawa (D – C, S) 43.0% Tsuyoshi Takano (L – K) 37.8%	
Nagano	1 (-1)	Kenta Wakabayashi (L); Toshimi Kitazawa (D)	Hideya Sugio (D – C, S) 52.5% Kenta Wakabayashi (L – K) 45.7%	L -1
Gifu	1 (-1)	Takeyuki Watanabe (L); Yoshiharu Komiyama (D)	Takeyuki Watanabe (L – K) 55.8% Yoshiharu Komiyama (D – C, S, PLP) 40.9%	D -1
Shizuoka	2	Shigeki Iwai (L); Yūji Fujimoto (D)	Shigeki Iwai (L – K) 44.3% Sachiko Hirayama (D – S) 41.0% Chika Suzuki (C) 10.2%	
Aichi	4 (+1)	Mashito Fujikawa (L); Yoshitaka Saitō (D); Misako Yasui (D)	Masahito Fujikawa (L) 29.3% Yoshitaka Saitō (D) 17.5% Ryūji Satomi (K – L) 16.2% Takae Itō (D) 15.8% Hatsumi Suyama (C) 9.2%	K +1
Mie	1	Hirokazu Shiba (D)	Hirokazu Shiba (D) 49.7% Sachiko Yamamoto (L – K) 47.5%	
Shiga	1	Kumiko Hayashi (D)	Takashi Koyari (L – K) 52.2% Kumiko Hayashi (D – C, S) 45.8%	D -1 L +1
Kyoto	2	Tetsurō Fukuyama (D); Satoshi Ninoyu (L)	Satoshi Ninoyu (L – K) 40.0% Tetsurō Fukuyama (D – S) 36.9% Toshitaka Ōkawara (C) 20.0%	
Osaka	4 (+1)	Issei Kitagawa (L); Tomoyuki Odachi (D); Hirotaka Ishikawa (K)	Rui Matsukawa (L) 20.4% Hitoshi Asada (Osaka Ishin) 19.5% Hirotaka Ishikawa (K) 18.2% Kaori Takagi (Osaka Ishin) 17.9% Yui Watanabe (C – PLP) 12.2% Tomoyuki Odachi (D – PLP) 9.3%	D -1 Osaka Ishin +2
Hyōgo	3 (+1)	Shinsuke Suematsu (L); Shun'ichi Mizuoka (D)	Shinsuke Suematsu (L) 26.3% Takae Itō (L – K) 22.2% Daisuke Katayama (Osaka Ishin) 21.8% Shun'ichi Mizuoka (D) 17.2%	D -1 L +1 Osaka Ishin +1
Nara	1	Kiyoshige Maekawa (D)	Kei Satō (L – K) 45.5% Kiyoshige Makawa (D – C, S, PLP) 33.7%	D -1 L +1
Wakayama	1	Yōsuke Tsuruho (L)	Yōsuke Tsuruho (L – K) 69.2% Takanobu Yura (I – C, S, PLP) 26.1%	
Tottori-Shimane	1 (-1 combined)	From Tottori: Kazuyuki Hamada (I); From Shimane: Kazuhiko Aoki (L)	Kazuhiko Aoki (L – K) 62.7% Hirohiko Fukushima (I – D, C, S, PLP) 34.7%	I -1
Okayama	1	Satsuki Eda (D)	Kimi Onoda (L – K) 55.6% Kentarō Kuroishi (D - C, S) 41.9%	D -1 L +1
Hiroshima	2	Yōichi Miyazawa (L); Minoru Yanagida (D)	Yōichi Miyazawa (L – K) 49.8% Minoru Yanagida (D – S) 23.1% Kana Haioka (Osaka Ishin) 13.8%	
Yamaguchi	1	Kiyoshi Ejima (L)	Kiyoshi Ejima (L – K) 64.0% Atsushi Kōketsu (I – D, C, S) 29.8%	
Tokushima-Kōchi	1 (-1 combined)	From Tokushima: Yūsuke Nakanishi (L); From Kōchi: Hajime Hirota (D)	Yūsuke Nakanishi (L) 54.1% Sō Ōnishi (I – D, C, S) 42.9%	D -1
Kagawa	1	Yoshihiko Isozaki (L)	Yoshihiko Isozaki (L – K) 65.1% Ken'ichi Tanabe (C – S, PLP) 26.1%	
Ehime	1	Junzō Yamamoto (L)	Junzō Yamamoto (L – K) 49.6% Takako Nagae (I – D, S) 48.3%	
Fukuoka	3 (+1)	Satoshi Ōie (L); Tsutomu Ōkubo (D)	Yukihito Koga (D) 30.7% Satoshi Ōie (L) 29.3% Hiromi Takase (K – L) 21.4% Masako Shibata (C) 9.0%	K +1
Saga	1	Takamaro Fukuoka (L)	Takamaro Fukuoka (L – K) 65.6% Tetsuji Nakamura (D – S) 31.3%	
Nagasaki	1	Genjirō Kaneko (L)	Genjirō Kaneko (L – K) 52.9% Hideko Nishioka (D – S, PLP) 44.9%	
Kumamoto	1	Yoshifumi Matsumura (L)	Yoshifumi Matsumura (L – K) 59.1% Hiromi Abe (I – D, C, S) 36.1%	
Ōita	1	Shin'ya Adachi (D)	Shin'ya Adachi (D) 48.1; Harutomo Koshō (L – K) 47.9%	
Miyazaki	1	Shinpei Matsushita (L)	Shinpei Matsushita (L – K) 62.0% Yōji Yomiyama (I – D, S) 33.5%	
Kagoshima	1	Tetsurō Nomura (L)	Tetsurō Nomura (L – K) 59.0% Kazumi Shimomachi (I – D, C, S) 29.2%	
Okinawa	1	Aiko Shimajiri (L)	Yōichi Iha (I) 57.8% Aiko Shimajiri (L - K) 40.6%	L -1 I (opposition) +1
National	48	(pre-election by parliamentary group, not by party) (Note: seats up 2016 from House of Councillors website as of June 2016); D 18; L 12; K 6 C 3 Osaka Ishin 2 S 2 AEJ 1 PLP 1 NRP 1 I 2)	L 35.9% of proportional votes→19 seats: Masayuki Tokushige 521,060; Shigeharu Aoyama 481,890; Satsuki Katayama 393,382; Satoshi Nakanishi 392,433; Eriko Imai 319,359; Toshiyuki Adachi 293,735; Eriko Yamatani 249,844; Shin'ya Fujiki 236,119; Hanako Jimi 210,562; Kanehiko Shindō 182,467; Emiko Takagai 177,810; Hiroshi Yamada 149,833; Toshiyuki Fujii 142,132; Masashi Adachi 139,110; Takashi Uto 137,993; Katsumi Ogawa 130,101; Yoshifumi Miyajima 122,833; Toshiei Mizuochi 114,485; Shūkō Sonoda 101,154; Isao Takeuchi 87,578... Tsuneo Horiuchi 84,597	(change from last election 2010) L +7 D (from DPJ) -5 K +1 C +2 Osaka Ishin (new +4) S -1 PLP (new +1) NRP -1 Kokoro (from Sunrise) -1 YP (defunct, now D/OIshin/Kokoro/L/I) -7
National	48	(pre-election by parliamentary group, not by party); D 18; L 12; K 6 C 3 Osaka Ishin 2 S 2 AEJ 1 PLP 1 NRP 1 I 2)	D 21.0% of proportional votes→11 seats: Masao Kobayashi 270,285; Makoto Hamaguchi 266,623; Wakako Yata 215,823; Yoshifu Arita 205,884; Nakanori Kawai 196,023; Shōji Nanba 191,823; Takashi Esaki 184,187; Masayoshi Nataniya 176,683; Michihiro Ishibashi 171,486; Kenzō Fujisue 143,188; Shinkun Haku 138,813; Kaoru Tashiro 113,571... Naoki Tanaka 86,596; Takumi Shibata 73,166... Takeshi Maeda 59,853; Jirō Ono 46,213; Masami Nishimura 38,899	(change from last election 2010) L +7 D (from DPJ) -5 K +1 C +2 Osaka Ishin (new +4) S -1 PLP (new +1) NRP -1 Kokoro (from Sunrise) -1 YP (defunct, now D/OIshin/Kokoro/L/I) -7
National	48	(pre-election by parliamentary group, not by party); D 18; L 12; K 6 C 3 Osaka Ishin 2 S 2 AEJ 1 PLP 1 NRP 1 I 2)	K 13.5% of proportional votes→7 seats: Hiroaki Nagasawa 942,266; Kōzō Akino 612,068; Shin'ichi Yokoyama 606,889; Seishi Kumano 605,223; Masaaki Taniai 478,174; Masayoshi Hamada 388,477; Masaru Miyazaki 18,571; Shinji Takeuchi 7,489	(change from last election 2010) L +7 D (from DPJ) -5 K +1 C +2 Osaka Ishin (new +4) S -1 PLP (new +1) NRP -1 Kokoro (from Sunrise) -1 YP (defunct, now D/OIshin/Kokoro/L/I) -7
National	48	(pre-election by parliamentary group, not by party); D 18; L 12; K 6 C 3 Osaka Ishin 2 S 2 AEJ 1 PLP 1 NRP 1 I 2)	C 10.7% of proportional votes→5 seats: Tadayoshi Ichida 77,348; Tomoko Tamura 49,113; Mikishi Daimon 33,078; Tomo Iwabuchi 31,099; Ryōsuke Takeda 23,938; Tomoko Okuda 23,680	(change from last election 2010) L +7 D (from DPJ) -5 K +1 C +2 Osaka Ishin (new +4) S -1 PLP (new +1) NRP -1 Kokoro (from Sunrise) -1 YP (defunct, now D/OIshin/Kokoro/L/I) -7
National	48	(pre-election by parliamentary group, not by party); D 18; L 12; K 6 C 3 Osaka Ishin 2 S 2 AEJ 1 PLP 1 NRP 1 I 2)	Osaka Ishin 9.2% of proportional votes→4 seats: Toranosuke Katayama 194,902; Yoshimi Watanabe 143,343; Mitsuko Ishii 68,147; Akira Ishii 50,073; Tsuyoshi Gibu 43,679	(change from last election 2010) L +7 D (from DPJ) -5 K +1 C +2 Osaka Ishin (new +4) S -1 PLP (new +1) NRP -1 Kokoro (from Sunrise) -1 YP (defunct, now D/OIshin/Kokoro/L/I) -7
National	48	(pre-election by parliamentary group, not by party); D 18; L 12; K 6 C 3 Osaka Ishin 2 S 2 AEJ 1 PLP 1 NRP 1 I 2)	S 2.7% of proportional votes→1 seat: Mizuho Fukushima 254,956; Tadatomo Yoshida 153,197	(change from last election 2010) L +7 D (from DPJ) -5 K +1 C +2 Osaka Ishin (new +4) S -1 PLP (new +1) NRP -1 Kokoro (from Sunrise) -1 YP (defunct, now D/OIshin/Kokoro/L/I) -7
National	48	(pre-election by parliamentary group, not by party); D 18; L 12; K 6 C 3 Osaka Ishin 2 S 2 AEJ 1 PLP 1 NRP 1 I 2)	PLP 1.9% of proportional votes→1 seat: Ai Aoki 109,050; Yumiko Himei 16,116	(change from last election 2010) L +7 D (from DPJ) -5 K +1 C +2 Osaka Ishin (new +4) S -1 PLP (new +1) NRP -1 Kokoro (from Sunrise) -1 YP (defunct, now D/OIshin/Kokoro/L/I) -7
National	48	(pre-election by parliamentary group, not by party); D 18; L 12; K 6 C 3 Osaka Ishin 2 S 2 AEJ 1 PLP 1 NRP 1 I 2)	Incumbents on other party lists without seat: Kokoro (1,3%): none SSN (1.2%): none NRP (1.0%): Tarō Yamada, Hiroyuki Arai; Angry voice of the people (0.8%): none HRP (0.7%): none	(change from last election 2010) L +7 D (from DPJ) -5 K +1 C +2 Osaka Ishin (new +4) S -1 PLP (new +1) NRP -1 Kokoro (from Sunrise) -1 YP (defunct, now D/OIshin/Kokoro/L/I) -7
