= Gotaro Yoshimura =

Japanese politician (1939–2026)

- 吉村 剛太郎
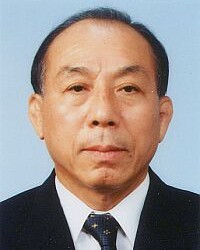

Member of the House of Councillors
- In office 26 July 1992 – 25 July 2010
- Preceded by: Kichinosuke Shigetomi
- Succeeded by: Satoshi Ōie
- Constituency: Fukuoka at-large

Member of the Fukuoka Prefectural Assembly
- In office 1975–1986
- Constituency: Fukuoka City Sawara Ward

Personal details
- Born: 3 January 1939 Harbin, Binjiang Province, Manchukuo
- Died: 27 October 2026 (aged 87)
- Party: PNP (2010–2013)
- Other political affiliations: LDP (1975–2009); Independent (2009–2010)
- Education: Waseda University

Gotaro Yoshimura (吉村 剛太郎, Yoshimura Gōtarō; 3 January 1939 – 27 October 2026) was a Japanese politician of the People's New Party and the Liberal Democratic Party, who served as a member of the House of Councillors in the Diet (national legislature). A native of Harbin in Manchukuo and graduate of Waseda University, he was elected to the House of Councillors for the first time in 1992 after serving in the assembly of Fukuoka Prefecture for three terms.

Yoshimura died from aspiration pneumonia on 27 October 2026, at the age of 87.

House of Councillors
Preceded by Sadao Fuchigami; Shirō Watanabe; Kichinosuke Shigetomi	Councillor for Fukuoka; 1992–2010; Served alongside: Kazunobu Yokoo, Shirō Watanabe, Kazuo Hirotomo, Tsutomu Ōkubo	Succeeded by Satoshi Ōie; Tsutomu Ōkubo
