= Mashima =

Mashima (written: 真島), also transliterated as Majima, is a Japanese surname. Notable people with the surname include:

- Hiro Mashima (真島 ヒロ, born 1977), Japanese manga artist
- Masatoshi Mashima (真島 昌利, born 1962), Japanese musician
- Shozo Majima (真島 省三, born 1963), Japanese politician

Fictional characters:

- Goro Majima (真島 吾朗), character from Like a Dragon
- Taichi Mashima (真島 太一), character from Chihayafuru
