= Tsutomu Okubo =

Japanese politician (born 1961)

- 大久保 勉
- Official portrait, 2012

Mayor of Kurume
- In office 31 January 2018 – 30 January 2022
- Preceded by: Toshinori Narahara
- Succeeded by: Shingo Haraguchi

Member of the House of Councillors
- In office 26 July 2004 – 25 July 2016
- Preceded by: Kazuo Hirotomo
- Succeeded by: Yukihito Koga
- Constituency: Fukuoka at-large

Personal details
- Born: 11 March 1961 (age 65) Kurume, Fukuoka, Japan
- Party: Independent (since 2018)
- Other political affiliations: DPJ (2004–2016); DP (2016–2018)
- Education: Kyoto University

Tsutomu Okubo (大久保 勉, Ōkubo Tsutomu; born March 11, 1961) is a former Japanese politician of the Democratic Party of Japan, who served as a member of the House of Councillors in the Diet (national legislature). A native of Kurume, Fukuoka and graduate of Kyoto University, he worked at Tokyo Bank from 1984 to 2004. He was elected to the House of Councillors for the first time in 2004.

House of Councillors
Preceded by Kazuo Hirotomo; Gōtarō Yoshimura	Councillor for Fukuoka; 2004– Served alongside: Gōtarō Yoshimura, Satoshi Ōie	Incumbent
