= Hirotomo =

- Gender: Male

Origin
- Origin: Japanese
- Meaning: Different meanings depending on the kanji used

Hirotomo (written: 礼朝 or 弘友) is a masculine Japanese given name. Notable people with the name include:

- Kazuo Hirotomo (弘友 和夫; born 1944), Japanese politician
