= Fuchigami =

Fuchigami (written: 渕上) is a Japanese surname. Notable people with the surname include:

- Ayako Fuchigami (渕上 綾子, born 1975), Japanese politician
- Mai Fuchigami (渕上 舞), Japanese voice actress
- Sadao Fuchigami (渕上 貞雄, born 1937), Japanese politician
