= Tsukasa Iwamoto =

Japanese politician

- 岩本 司
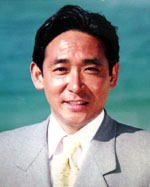
- Iwamoto in 2011

Member of the House of Councillors
- In office 29 July 2001 – 28 July 2013
- Preceded by: Mieno Eiko
- Succeeded by: Kuniyoshi Noda
- Constituency: Fukuoka at-large

Member of the Shibuya City Assembly
- In office 1995–1999

Personal details
- Born: 21 July 1964 (age 62) Fukuoka, Japan
- Party: Democratic
- Other political affiliations: Japan New Party
- Education: Nihon University

Tsukasa Iwamoto (岩本 司, Iwamoto Tsukasa; born July 21, 1964) is a former Japanese politician of the Democratic Party of Japan, who served as a member of the House of Councillors in the Diet (national legislature). A native of Fukuoka, Fukuoka and graduate of Nihon University, he had served in the ward assembly of Shibuya, Tokyo since 1993. After running unsuccessfully for the House of Representatives in 2000, he was elected to the House of Councillors for the first time in 2001.

House of Councillors
Preceded by Kentaro Koba; Shigeko Mieno	Councillor for Fukuoka's At-large district 2001– Served alongside: Masaji Matsuyama	Incumbent
