= Yuko Nakada =

Japanese politician (born 1989)

- 中田 優子

Member of the House of Councillors
- Incumbent
- Assumed office 29 July 2025
- Preceded by: Kuniyoshi Noda
- Constituency: Fukuoka at-large

Personal details
- Born: December 12, 1989 (age 36) Fukuoka, Japan
- Party: Sanseitō

Yuko Nakada (中田優子, Nakada Yuko; born December 12, 1989) is a Japanese politician serving as a member of the House of Councillors since 2025. She is a member of Sanseitō.

== Biography ==
Nakada was born in Fukuoka on December 12, 1989. She was a student in public high school, but questioning the need for learning trigonometric functions, she dropped out in the second year. Nakada graduated from correspondence high school. She worked in beauty industry from 2013, and in real estate since 2018.

Nakada felt unease with the coverage of covid vaccines during the pandemic, and found out about Sanseitō when she was gathering information on the internet. She started to get involved with the party's activities around 2022.

Nakada was elected from Fukuoka at-large district in 2025 Japanese House of Councillors election.
