= Masaji Matsuyama =

Japanese politician

- 松山 政司
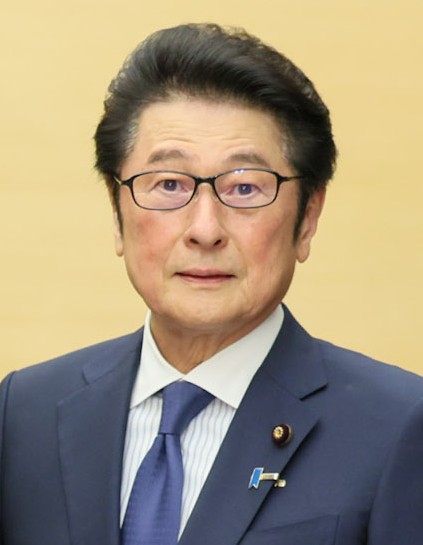
- Matsuyama in 2025

Member of the House of Councillors
- Incumbent
- Assumed office 29 July 2001
- Preceded by: Kentaro Koba
- Constituency: Fukuoka at-large

Personal details
- Born: 20 January 1959 (age 67) Shiida, Fukuoka, Japan
- Party: Liberal Democratic
- Education: Meiji University

Masaji Matsuyama (松山 政司, Matsuyama Masaji; born 20 January 1959) is a Japanese politician of the Liberal Democratic Party, a member of the House of Councillors in the Diet (national legislature).

A native of Shiida, Fukuoka and graduate of Meiji University, he was elected for the first time in 2001.

House of Councillors
Preceded by Kentaro Koba; Shigeko Mieno	Councillor for Fukuoka's At-large district 2001– Served alongside: Tsukasa Iwamoto	Incumbent
Party political offices
Preceded by Hiroshige Seko	Secretary General of the Liberal Democratic Party in the House of Councillors; 2024—2025	Succeeded by Junichi Ishii
Preceded by Keizo Takemi	Chairman of the Liberal Democratic Party in the House of Councillors; 2025–present	Incumbent
