= Rokuta Shimono =

Japanese politician

- 下野 六太
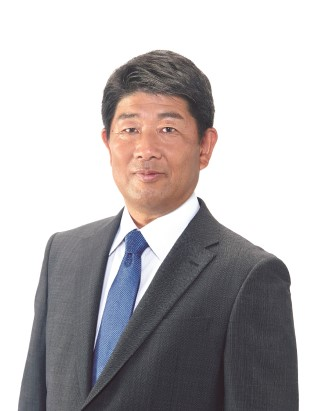
- Official portrait, 2021

Member of the House of Councillors
- Incumbent
- Assumed office 29 July 2019
- Preceded by: Kuniyoshi Noda
- Constituency: Fukuoka at-large

Personal details
- Born: 1 May 1964 (age 62) Yahatanishi, Kitakyūshū, Japan
- Party: Komeito
- Education: Shimane University; University of Teacher Education Fukuoka

Rokuta Shimono is a Japanese politician who is a member of the House of Councillors of Japan.

== Career ==
Shimono worked as a teacher before his election in 2019.
