= Hiromi Takase =

Japanese politician

- 高瀬 弘美

Member of the House of Councillors
- In office 26 July 2016 – 25 July 2022
- Preceded by: Seat established
- Succeeded by: Kōzō Akino
- Constituency: Fukuoka at-large

Personal details
- Born: 21 December 1981 (age 44) Honami, Fukuoka, Japan
- Party: Komeito
- Education: Sōka University; Columbia University

Hiromi Takase is a former Japanese politician who was a member of the House of Councillors of Japan. She was elected in 2016 but retired in 2022 for health reasons.
