= Fukuoka at-large district =

Japan House of Councillors constituency

- 福岡県選挙区
- Parliamentary constituency for the House of Councillors
- Prefecture: Fukuoka
- Electorate: 4,223,753 (as of September 2022)

Current constituency
- Created: 1947
- Seats: 6
- Councillors: Class of 2019: Masaji Matsuyama (LDP); Rokuta Shimono (Komeito); Kuniyoshi Noda (CDP); Class of 2022: Satoshi Ōie (LDP); Yukihito Koga (CDP); Kōzō Akino (Komeito)

Fukuoka at-large district is a constituency of the House of Councillors in the Diet of Japan (national legislature). It consists of the entire prefecture of Fukuoka and is represented by four Councillors electing two per election by single non-transferable vote.

Between 1947 and 1995 Gunma was represented by six Councillors. The 1994 electoral reform reapportioned the number of seats, increasing the number of Councillors in Miyagi, Saitama, Kanagawa and Gifu by two each (one per election) and reducing the number in Hokkaido, Hyogo and Fukuoka. Since the election of 2001 Fukuoka, like most two-member districts, has split seats between the two major parties, the Liberal Democratic Party (LDP) and the Democratic Party of Japan (DPJ).

== Elected Councillors ==
class of 1947			election year	class of 1950		
#1 (1947: #1, 6-year term)	#2 (1947: #2, 6-year term)	#3 (1947: #3, 6-year term)	election year	#1 (1947: #4, 3-year term)	#2 (1947: #5, 3-year term)	#3 (1947: #6, 3-year term)
Shunsaku Noda (Indep.)	Kane Hatano (JSP)	Tamotsu Hashigami (DP)	1947	Torazō Hamada (JSP)	Senju Shimada (JSP)	Inoo Dan (JLP)
Shunsaku Noda (Indep.)	Kane Hatano (JSP)	Hōsei Yoshida (JSP)	1950 by-el.	Torazō Hamada (JSP)	Senju Shimada (JSP)	Inoo Dan (JLP)
Shunsaku Noda (Indep.)	Kane Hatano (JSP)	Hōsei Yoshida (JSP)	1950	Masao Komatsu (JSP)	Inoo Dan (LP)	Takao Nishida (DP)
Hōsei Yoshida (JSP, left)	Toshihiro Kennoki (Yoshida LP)	Shunsaku Noda (Ryokufūkai)	1953	Masao Komatsu (JSP)	Inoo Dan (LP)	Takao Nishida (DP)
Hōsei Yoshida (JSP, left)	Toshihiro Kennoki (Yoshida LP)	Shunsaku Noda (Ryokufūkai)	1955 by-el.	Masao Komatsu (JSP)	Tsunekatsu Yamamoto (JSP, left)	Takao Nishida (DP)
Hōsei Yoshida (JSP, left)	Toshihiro Kennoki (Yoshida LP)	Shunsaku Noda (Ryokufūkai)	1956	Tsunekatsu Yamamoto (JSP)	Kiyomi Abe (JSP)	Takao Nishida (LDP)
Hōsei Yoshida (JSP, left)	Toshihiro Kennoki (Yoshida LP)	Shunsaku Noda (Ryokufūkai)	1958 by-el.	Isamu Koyanagi (JSP)	Kiyomi Abe (JSP)	Takao Nishida (LDP)
Hōsei Yoshida (JSP)	Shunsaku Noda (LDP)	Toshihiro Kennoki (LDP)	1959	Isamu Koyanagi (JSP)	Kiyomi Abe (JSP)	Takao Nishida (LDP)
Hōsei Yoshida (JSP)	Shunsaku Noda (LDP)	Toshihiro Kennoki (LDP)	1962	Hikaru Kamei (LDP)	Isamu Koyanagi (JSP)	Ryūsuke Moribe (LDP)
Ichitarō Komiya (JSP)	Shunsaku Noda (LDP)	Toshihiro Kennoki (LDP)	1963 by-el.	Hikaru Kamei (LDP)	Isamu Koyanagi (JSP)	Ryūsuke Moribe (LDP)
Toshihiro Kennoki (LDP)	Momotarō Yanagida (LDP)	Akira Ono (JSP)	1965	Hikaru Kamei (LDP)	Isamu Koyanagi (JSP)	Ryūsuke Moribe (LDP)
Toshihiro Kennoki (LDP)	Momotarō Yanagida (LDP)	Akira Ono (JSP)	1967 by-el.	Katsuyuki Onimaru (LDP)	Isamu Koyanagi (JSP)	Ryūsuke Moribe (LDP)
Toshihiro Kennoki (LDP)	Momotarō Yanagida (LDP)	Akira Ono (JSP)	1968	Isamu Koyanagi (JSP)	Katsuyuki Onimaru (LDP)	Masafumi Yoneda (LDP)
Akira Ono (JSP)	Toshihiro Kennoki (LDP)	Momotarō Yanagida (LDP)	1971	Isamu Koyanagi (JSP)	Katsuyuki Onimaru (LDP)	Masafumi Yoneda (LDP)
Akira Ono (JSP)	Toshihiro Kennoki (LDP)	Momotarō Yanagida (LDP)	1974	Isamu Koyanagi (JSP)	Kazuhisa Arita (LDP)	Yoshiharu Kuwana (Kōmeitō)
Masao Endō (LDP)	Tatsuru Harada (Kōmeitō)	Akira Ono (JSP)	1977	Isamu Koyanagi (JSP)	Kazuhisa Arita (LDP)	Yoshiharu Kuwana (Kōmeitō)
Masao Endō (LDP)	Tatsuru Harada (Kōmeitō)	Akira Ono (JSP)	1980	Shūji Kurauchi (LDP)	Isamu Koyanagi (JSP)	Yoshiharu Kuwana (Kōmeitō)
Masao Endō (LDP)	Tatsuru Harada (Kōmeitō)	Akira Ono (JSP)	1983	Shūji Kurauchi (LDP)	Isamu Koyanagi (JSP)	Yoshiharu Kuwana (Kōmeitō)
Masao Endō (LDP)	Tatsuru Harada (Kōmeitō)	Akira Ono (JSP)	1986	Yukihiro Fukuda (LDP)	Shirō Watanabe (JSP)	Kazuki Motomura (LDP)
Masao Endō (LDP)	Tatsuru Harada (Kōmeitō)	Akira Ono (JSP)	1989 by-el.	Sadao Fuchigami (JSP)	Shirō Watanabe (JSP)	Kazuki Motomura (LDP)
Akira Ono (JSP)	Kentarō Koba (Kōmeitō)	Kei Ōma (LDP)	1989	Sadao Fuchigami (JSP)	Shirō Watanabe (JSP)	Kazuki Motomura (LDP)
Akira Ono (JSP)	Kentarō Koba (Kōmeitō)	Kei Ōma (LDP)	1991 by-el.	Sadao Fuchigami (JSP)	Shirō Watanabe (JSP)	Kichinosuke Shigetomi (LDP)
Akira Ono (JSP)	Kentarō Koba (Kōmeitō)	Kei Ōma (LDP)	1992	Kazunobu Yokoo (Kōmeitō)	Shirō Watanabe (JSP)	Gōtarō Yoshimura (LDP)
Kentarō Koba (NFP)	Shigeko Mieno (JSP)	–	1995	Kazunobu Yokoo (Kōmeitō)	Shirō Watanabe (JSP)	Gōtarō Yoshimura (LDP)
Kentarō Koba (NFP)	Shigeko Mieno (JSP)	–	1998	Kazuo Hirotomo (Indep.)	Gōtarō Yoshimura (LDP)	–
Masaji Matsuyama (LDP)	Tsukasa Iwamoto (DPJ)	–	2001	Kazuo Hirotomo (Indep.)	Gōtarō Yoshimura (LDP)	–
Masaji Matsuyama (LDP)	Tsukasa Iwamoto (DPJ)	–	2004	Tsutomu Ōkubo (DPJ)	Gōtarō Yoshimura (LDP)	–
Tsukasa Iwamoto (DPJ)	Masaji Matsuyama (LDP)	–	2007	Tsutomu Ōkubo (DPJ)	Gōtarō Yoshimura (LDP)	–
Tsukasa Iwamoto (DPJ)	Masaji Matsuyama (LDP)	–	2010	Satoshi Ōie (LDP)	Tsutomu Ōkubo (DPJ)	–
Masaji Matsuyama (LDP)	Kuniyoshi Noda (DPJ)	–	2013	Satoshi Ōie (LDP)	Tsutomu Ōkubo (DPJ)	–
Masaji Matsuyama (LDP)	Kuniyoshi Noda (DPJ)	–	2016	Yukihito Koga (DPJ)	Satoshi Ōie (LDP)	Hiromi Takase (Kōmeitō)
Masaji Matsuyama (LDP)	Rokuta Shimono (Kōmeitō)	–	2019	Yukihito Koga (DPJ)	Satoshi Ōie (LDP)	Hiromi Takase (Kōmeitō)
Masaji Matsuyama (LDP)	Rokuta Shimono (Kōmeitō)	Kuniyoshi Noda (CDP)	2022	Satoshi Ōie (LDP)	Yukihito Koga (CDP)	Kōzō Akino (Kōmeitō)

== Recent election results ==
2022
Party	Candidate	Votes	%	±%
LDP	Satoshi Ōie (Incumbent)	586,217	29.21%	
CDP	Yukihito Koga (Incumbent)	438,876	21.87%	
Komeito	Kōzō Akino (Incumbent) (Endorsed by Liberal Democratic Party)	348,700	17.38%	
Ishin	Mayumi Tatsuno	158,772	7.91%	
DPP	Kyoko Ota	133,900	6.67%	
JCP	Shozo Majima	98,747	4.92%	
Reiwa	Fumiyo Okuda	82,333	4.10%	
Sanseito	Shinsuke Nonaka	72,263	3.60%	
Social Democratic	Umi Tsukazaki	30,190	1.50%	
Anti-NHK	Kaori Mashima	14,513	0.72%	
Anti-NHK	Eiji Kumamaru	9,309	0.46%	
Anti-NHK	Masako Wada	8,917	0.44%	
Happiness Realization	Masatoshi Enatsu	7,962	0.40%	
Independent	Issei Tsushima	7,186	0.36%	
Japan First	Rei Senzaki	4,908	0.24%	
Truth of Renewable Energy	Yoshiaki Kumisaka	3,868	0.19%	
Turnout		2,006,661	48.76%	▲5.01

2019
Party	Candidate	Votes	%	±%
LDP	Masaji Matsuyama (Incumbent)	583,351	33.19%	
Komeito	Rokuta Shimono (Endorsed by Liberal Democratic Party)	401,495	22.84%	
CDP	Kuniyoshi Noda (Incumbent) (Endorsed by SDP)	365,634	20.80%	
JCP	Kono Sachiko	171,436	9.75%	
DPP	Kumiko Haruta	143,955	8.19%	
Anti-NHK	Naohiro Kawaguchi	46,362	2.64%	
CES	Akiko Hondo	15,511	0.88%	
Happiness Realization	Masatoshi Enatsu	15,380	0.88%	
Tsubasa	Hamatake Shinichi	14,586	0.83%	
Turnout		1,757,710	42.85%	▼10.03

2010
Party	Candidate	Votes	%	±%
LDP	Satoshi Ōie	774,618		
DPJ	Tsutomu Ōkubo	673,749		
YP	Masao Satō	287,349		
Independent (DPJ, SDP support)	Kaname Tsutsumi	176,149		
JCP	Kiyoshi Shinoda	145,093		
PNP	Gōtarō Yoshimura	113,607		
HRP	Kazue Yoshitomi	25,693		
Turnout		2,295,557	56.07	

2007
Party	Candidate	Votes	%	±%
DPJ	Tsukasa Iwamoto	1,003,170		
LDP (Kōmeitō support)	Masaji Matsuyama	791,152		
JCP	Miyuki Tanaka	185,713		
SDP	Hideo Kanaiwa	113,293		
Ishin Seitō Shinpū	Yoshihisa Baba	35,942		
Kyōsei Shintō	Takayuki Shūnan	15,244		
Turnout		2,234,285	54.83	
