= Kuniyoshi Noda =

Japanese politician

- 野田 国義
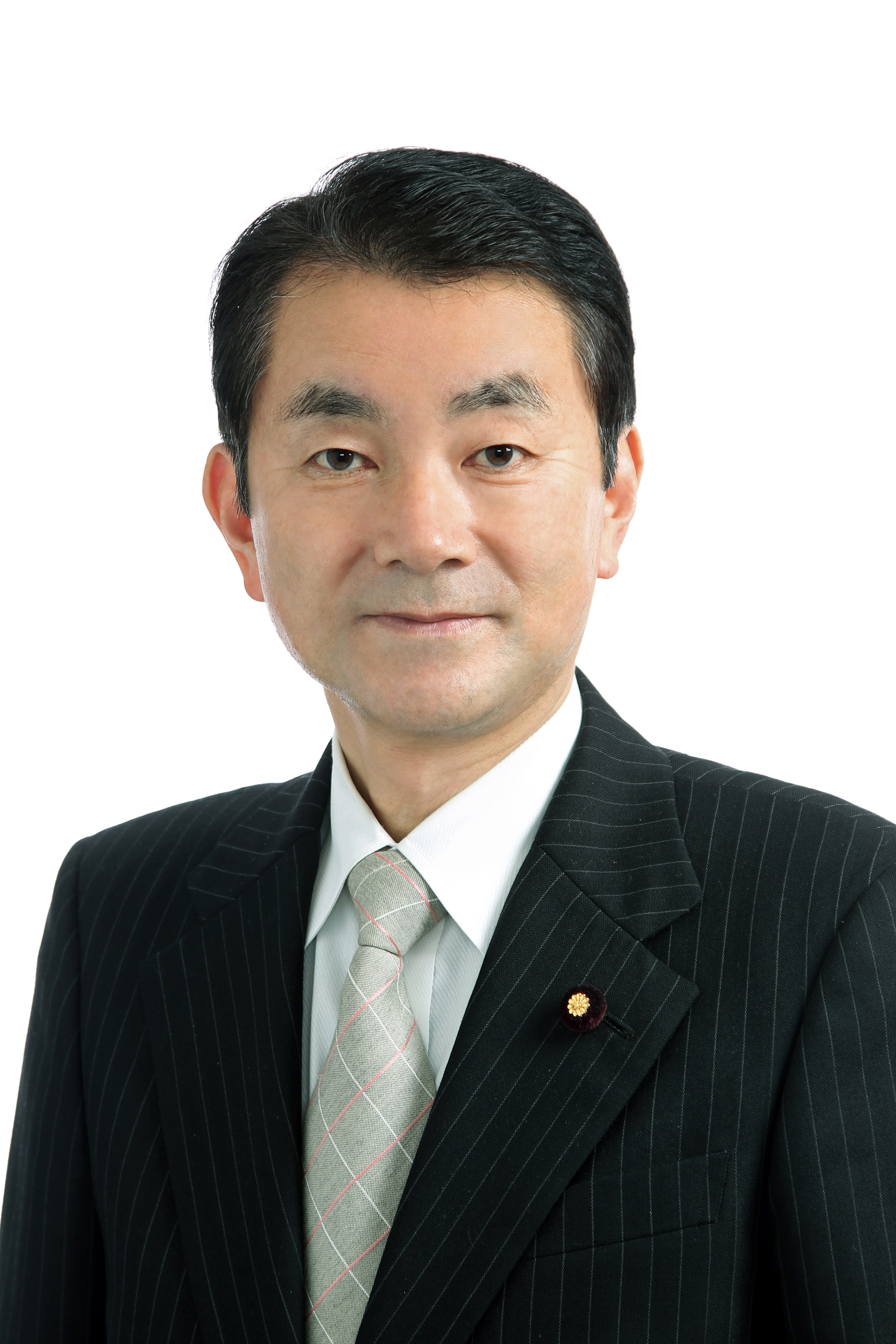
- Official portrait, 2022

Member of the House of Councillors
- In office 29 July 2013 – 28 July 2025
- Preceded by: Tsukasa Iwamoto
- Succeeded by: Yuko Nakada
- Constituency: Fukuoka at-large

Member of the House of Representatives
- In office 31 August 2009 – 16 November 2012
- Constituency: Kyushu PR

Mayor of Yame
- In office 30 January 1993 – 30 September 2008
- Preceded by: Kiyomi Saito
- Succeeded by: Tsuneyuki Mitamura

Personal details
- Born: 3 June 1958 (age 68) Yame, Fukuoka, Japan
- Party: CDP (since 2018)
- Other political affiliations: Independent (1993–2009); DPJ (2009–2016); DP (2016–2018)
- Education: Nihon University, College of Law
- Occupation: Lawyer

Kuniyoshi Noda is a Japanese politician who is a member of the House of Councillors of Japan.

Noda was part of the CDP's shadow cabinet 'Next Cabinet' as the shadow Minister of Internal Affairs and Communications.

== Career ==
Noda graduated from Nihon University. In 2009, he was elected to the House of Representatives and in 2013 elected to the House of Councillors.
