= Mikishi Daimon =

Japanese politician

- 大門 実紀史
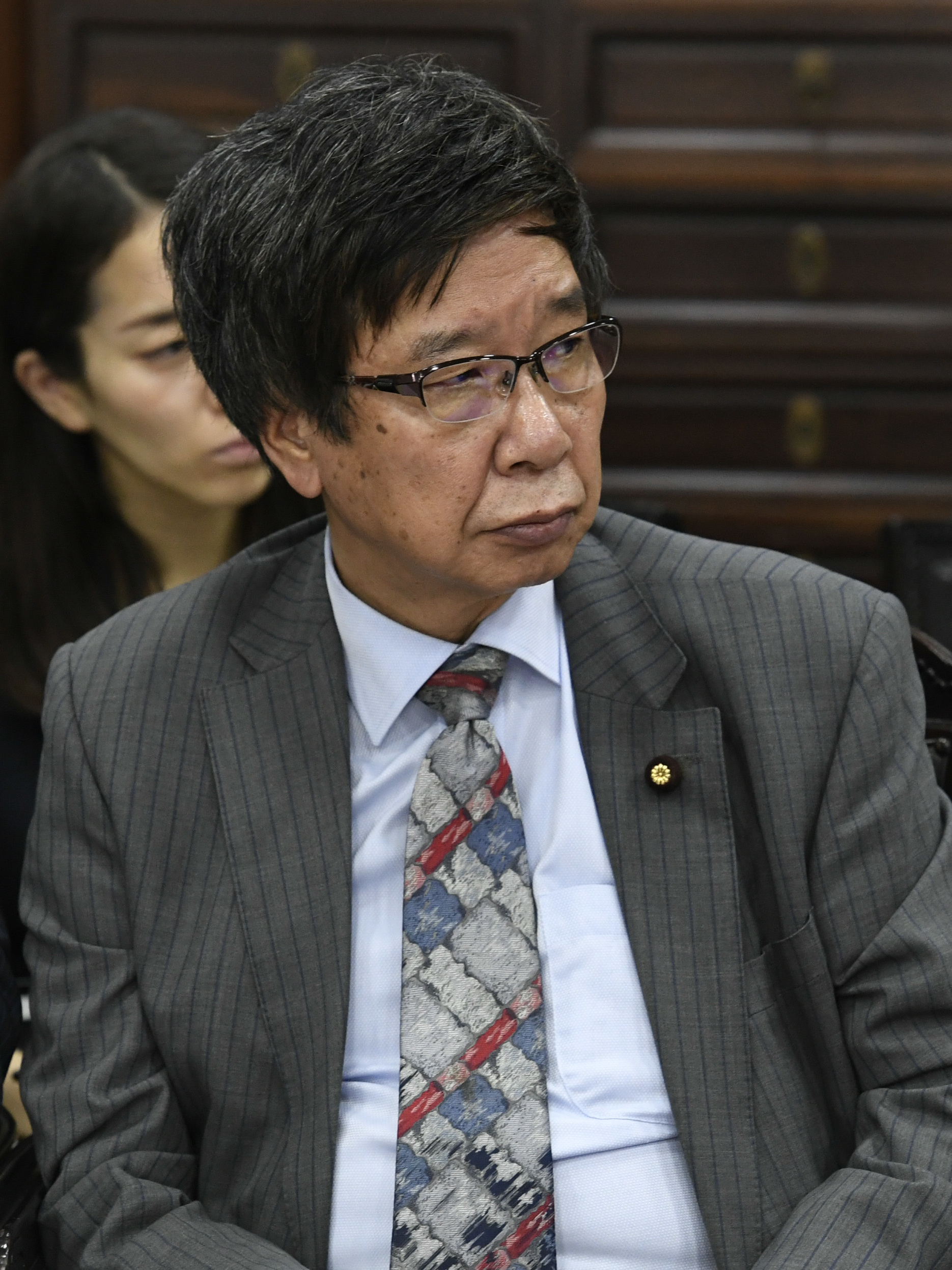
- Daimon in 2020

Member of the House of Councillors
- Incumbent
- Assumed office 22 October 2024
- Preceded by: Tomoko Tamura
- Constituency: National PR
- In office January 2001 – 25 July 2022
- Constituency: National PR

Personal details
- Born: 10 January 1956 (age 70) Kita-ku, Kyoto, Japan
- Party: Communist
- Education: Kobe University

Mikishi Daimon (大門 実紀史, Daimon Mikishi; born January 10, 1956) is a Japanese politician of the Japanese Communist Party, a member of the House of Councillors in the Diet (national legislature). A native of Kyoto, Kyoto and dropout of Kobe University, he was elected to the House of Councillors for the first time in 2001 after an unsuccessful run in 1998.
