= Masaaki Taniai =

Japanese politician (born 1973)

- 谷合 正明
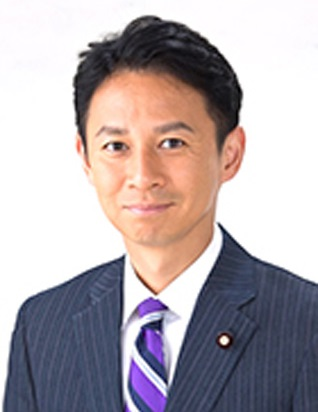
- Official portrait, 2017

Member of the House of Councillors
- Incumbent
- Assumed office 26 July 2004
- Constituency: National PR

Personal details
- Born: 27 April 1973 (age 53) Niiza, Saitama, Japan
- Party: Komeito
- Education: Kyoto University

Masaaki Taniai (谷合 正明, Taniai Masaaki; born 1973) is a Japanese politician of the New Komeito Party, a member of the House of Councillors in the Diet (national legislature). A native of Niiza, Saitama, he attended Kyoto University and received a master's degree in agricultural economy from it. He also studied at Uppsala University in Sweden. He was elected to the House of Councillors for the first time in 2004.
