= Tomo Iwabuchi =

Japanese politician

- 岩渕 友
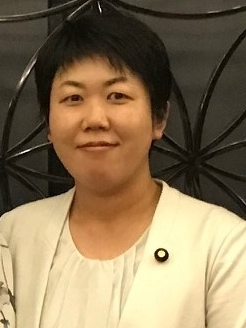
- Iwabuchi in 2018

Member of the House of Councillors
- Incumbent
- Assumed office 26 July 2016
- Constituency: National PR

Personal details
- Born: 3 October 1976 (age 49) Kitakata, Fukushima, Japan
- Party: Communist
- Education: Fukushima University

Tomo Iwabuchi (Japanese: 岩渕 友, Hepburn: Iwabuchi Tomo; 3 October 1976, Fukushima Prefecture) is a member of both the Japanese Communist Party and the Japanese House of Councillors. She was elected to her seat in the national proportional representation block in 2016. Iwabuchi is opposed to nuclear reactors in Japan, advocating for their elimination and against their reactivation.
