= Sadao Fuchigami =

Japanese politician (1937–2023)

- 渕上 貞雄

Member of the House of Councillors
- In office 12 February 1989 – 25 July 2010
- Preceded by: Yukihiro Fukuda
- Succeeded by: Tadatomo Yoshida
- Constituency: Fukuoka at-large (1989–1992); National PR (1992–2010)

Personal details
- Born: 19 March 1937 Tagawa, Fukuoka, Japan
- Died: 13 October 2023 (aged 86) Kurume, Fukuoka, Japan
- Party: Social Democratic
- Other political affiliations: Socialist (1989–1996)
- Website: fuchigamisadao.com

Sadao Fuchigami (渕上 貞雄, Fuchigami Sadao; 19 March 1937 – 13 October 2023) was a Japanese politician and member of the House of Councillors for the Social Democratic Party. He died from ureteral cancer on 13 October 2023, at the age of 86.
