= Yukihito Koga =

- 古賀 之士
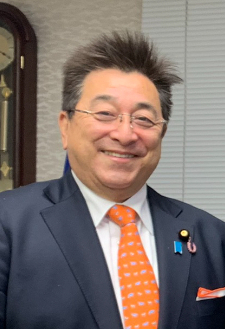
- Koga in 2021

Member of the House of Councillors
- Incumbent
- Assumed office 26 July 2016
- Preceded by: Tsutomu Okubo
- Constituency: Fukuoka at-large

Personal details
- Born: 9 April 1959 (age 67) Kurume, Fukuoka, Japan
- Party: CDP (since 2020)
- Other political affiliations: DPJ (2015–2016); DP (2016–2018); DPP (2018–2020)
- Education: Meiji University

Yukihito Koga is a Japanese politician who is a member of the House of Councillors of Japan.

== Career ==
Koga worked for Fukuoka Broadcasting System Corporation before he was elected in 2016.
