= Shinichi Yokoyama =

Japanese politician (born 1959)

- 横山 信一
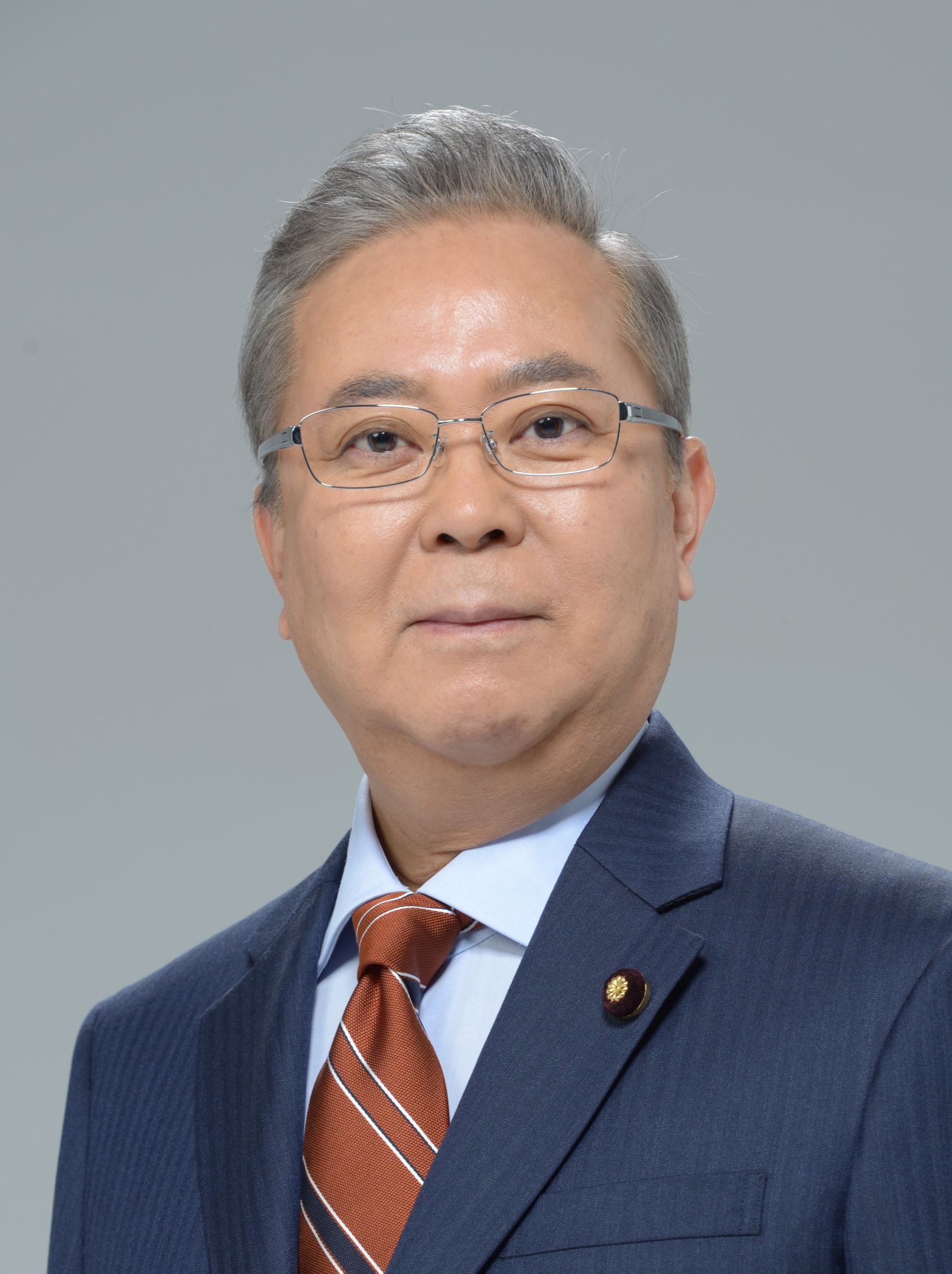
- Official portrait, 2022

Member of the House of Councillors
- Incumbent
- Assumed office 26 July 2010
- Constituency: National PR

Member of the Hokkaido Legislative Assembly
- In office 2003–2010
- Constituency: Hakodate City

Personal details
- Born: 21 July 1959 (age 67) Obihiro, Hokkaido, Japan
- Party: Komeito
- Children: 2
- Education: Hokkaido University

Shinichi Yokoyama (横山 信一, Yokoyama Shin'ichi; born July 21, 1959) is a Japanese politician who is a member of the House of Councillors of Japan.

== Career ==
In 1990, he started work with the Hokkaido government in the Prefectural Fisheries Research Institutes. He was elected in 2010, 2016, and re-elected in 2022. In 2018, he was chairman of the judicial affairs committee and a photograph of his appearance speaking against a bill became a popular meme.
