= Kanehiko Shindo =

Japanese politician

Kanehiko Shindō
- 進藤 金日子
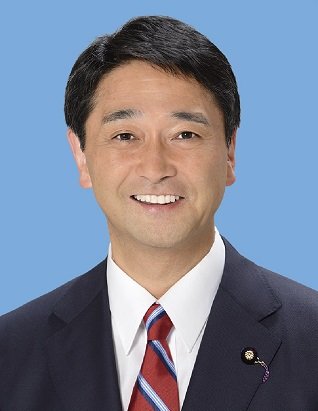
- Official portrait, 2019

Member of the House of Councillors
- Incumbent
- Assumed office 26 July 2016
- Constituency: National PR

Personal details
- Born: 7 July 1963 (age 63) Kyōwa, Akita, Japan
- Party: Liberal Democratic
- Education: Iwate University

Kanehiko Shindō is a Japanese politician who is a member of the House of Councillors of Japan. He is a representative in the national proportional representation block.

== Career ==
Shindō studied civil engineering and worked in Ministry of Agriculture, Forestry and Fisheries in 1986 and retired in 2005. He was elected in 2016 and re-elected in 2022.
