= Shozo Majima =

Japanese politician

- 真島 省三
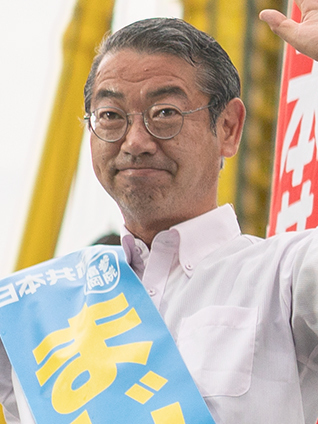
- Majima in 2022

Member of the House of Representatives
- In office 19 December 2014 – 28 September 2017
- Constituency: Kyushu PR

Member of the Fukuoka Prefectural Assembly
- In office 2007–2011
- Constituency: Yahatanishi Ward

Personal details
- Born: 12 January 1963 (age 63) Sasebo, Nagasaki, Japan
- Party: Communist
- Education: Kyushu Institute of Technology

Shozo Majima (真島 省三) is a member of the Japanese Communist Party serving in the House of Representatives. He was elected to this position in 2014.

== Career ==
In the 2007 unified local elections, Majima ran for the Fukuoka Prefectural Assembly for Yahatahigashi ward. He won in 2007, becoming the first communist member of the Assembly, but lost his re-election bid in 2011.
