= Kentaro Koba =

Japanese politician (born 1952)

- 木庭 健太郎

Member of the House of Councillors
- In office 23 July 1989 – 28 July 2013
- Preceded by: Tatsuru Harada
- Succeeded by: Multi-member district
- Constituency: Fukuoka at-large (1989–2001); National PR (2001–2013)

Personal details
- Born: 25 June 1952 (age 74) Mii, Fukuoka, Japan
- Party: Komeito
- Other political affiliations: CGP (1989–1994); NFP (1994–1998)
- Education: Sōka University

Kentaro Koba (木庭 健太郎, Koba Kentarō; born 25 June 1952) is a Japanese politician of the New Komeito Party, a member of the House of Councillors in the Diet (national legislature). A native of Mii District, Fukuoka and graduate of Soka University, he worked at Nishinippon Shimbun from 1975 to 1988 as a reporter. He was elected to the House of Councillors for the first time in 1989.
