= Satoshi Ōie =

Japanese politician

- 大家 敏志
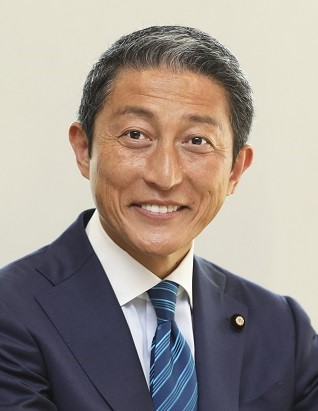
- Official portrait, 2021

Member of the House of Councillors
- Incumbent
- Assumed office 26 July 2010
- Preceded by: Gotaro Yoshimura
- Constituency: Fukuoka at-large

Member of the Fukuoka Prefectural Assembly
- In office 30 April 1999 – May 2010
- Constituency: Kitakyushu City Yahatahigashi Ward

Personal details
- Born: 17 July 1967 (age 59) Kitakyushu, Fukuoka, Japan
- Party: Liberal Democratic
- Education: University of Kitakyushu

Satoshi Ōie (born July 17, 1967, in Fukuoka Prefecture, Japan) is a Japanese politician who has served as a member of the House of Councillors of Japan since 2010. He represents the Fukuoka at-large district as a member of the Liberal Democratic Party.

He has directed the House's Committee on Financial Affairs since 2016.
