= Kōzō Akino =

Japanese Politician

- 秋野 公造
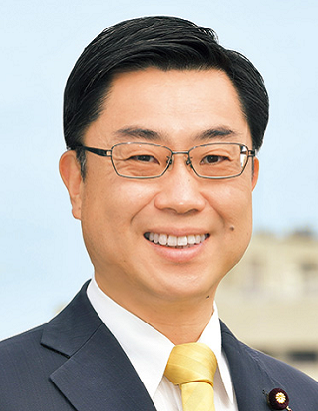
- Official portrait, 2022

Member of the House of Councillors
- Incumbent
- Assumed office 26 July 2010
- Preceded by: Multi-member district
- Constituency: National PR (2010–2022); Fukuoka at-large (2022–present)

Personal details
- Born: 11 July 1967 (age 59) Kobe, Hyōgo, Japan
- Party: Komeito
- Education: Nagasaki University

Kōzō Akino is a Japanese politician who has served as a member of the House of Councillors of Japan, since 2010. He represents the National proportional representation block as a member of the Komeito party. He currently serves on the following committees:

- Committee on Financial Affairs (Director)
- Committee on Discipline
- Special Committee on Okinawa and Northern Problems
- Deliberative Council on Political Ethics

== Early life ==
Akino was born on July 11, 1967, in the Hyogo Prefecture of Japan. He graduated from the Nagasaki University School of Medicine in 1992. He also earned a doctorate in Biomedical Sciences from that same university, in 1996.

== Medical career ==
Prior to his election to the House of Councillors, Akino worked as professor of medicine and directed offices in the Ministry of Health, Labour and Welfare. A summary of his career is below:

- 1996-2000: Assistant professor in the School of Medicine, Nagasaki University.
- 2000-01: received specialized instruction at Cedars-Sinai Medical Center in Los Angeles, California.
- 2001-06: Lecturer in the School of Medicine, Nagasaki University.
- 2006-08: Assistant Director of the Disease Control Division of the Health Service Bureau, Ministry of Health, Labour and Welfare.
- 2008-09: Assistant Director of the Blood and Blood Products Division of the Pharmaceutical and Food Safety Bureau, Ministry of Health, Labour and Welfare.
- 2009-10: Director of the Tokyo Airport Quarantine Branch, Tokyo Quarantine Station.

== Political career ==
In 2010, he was elected to the House of Councillors. He is currently in his second term, which will expire in 2022. During his terms in office he has served as chairman of several different committees in the House of Councillors, including:

- 2014-16: Special Committee on Disasters
- 2016-18: Committee on Judicial Affairs
- 2018-20: Committee on General Affairs
- 2020–present: Committee on Financial Affairs

He has also briefly served in the Cabinet. In 2012 he served as Parliamentary Secretary of the Environment.
