= Kazuo Hirotomo =

Japanese politician

- 弘友 和夫
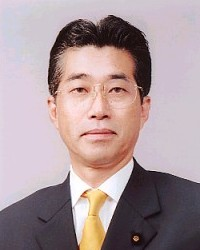

Member of the House of Councillors
- In office 26 July 1998 – 25 July 2010
- Preceded by: Kazunobu Yokoo
- Succeeded by: Multi-member district
- Constituency: Fukuoka at-large (1998–2004); National PR (2004–2010)

Member of the House of Representatives
- In office 19 July 1993 – 27 September 1996
- Preceded by: Kiyoshi Kaji
- Succeeded by: Constituency abolished
- Constituency: Fukuoka 4th

Member of the Kitakyushu City Assembly
- In office 1977–1993

Personal details
- Born: 17 August 1944 (age 82) Kitakyushu, Fukuoka, Japan
- Party: Komeito (since 1998)
- Other political affiliations: CGP (1977–1994); NFP (1994–1997); Independent (1997–1998)
- Education: Chuo University

Kazuo Hirotomo (弘友 和夫, Hirotomo Kazuo; born August 17, 1944) is a Japanese politician of the New Komeito Party, a member of the House of Councillors in the Diet (national legislature). A native of Kitakyūshū, Fukuoka and graduate of Chuo University, he was elected to the House of Representatives for the first time in 1993 after serving in the city assembly of Kitakyushu. In 1998, he was elected to the House of Councillors for the first time.
