= 2009 Democratic Party of Japan leadership election =

Political leadership election in Japan

- 16 May 2009
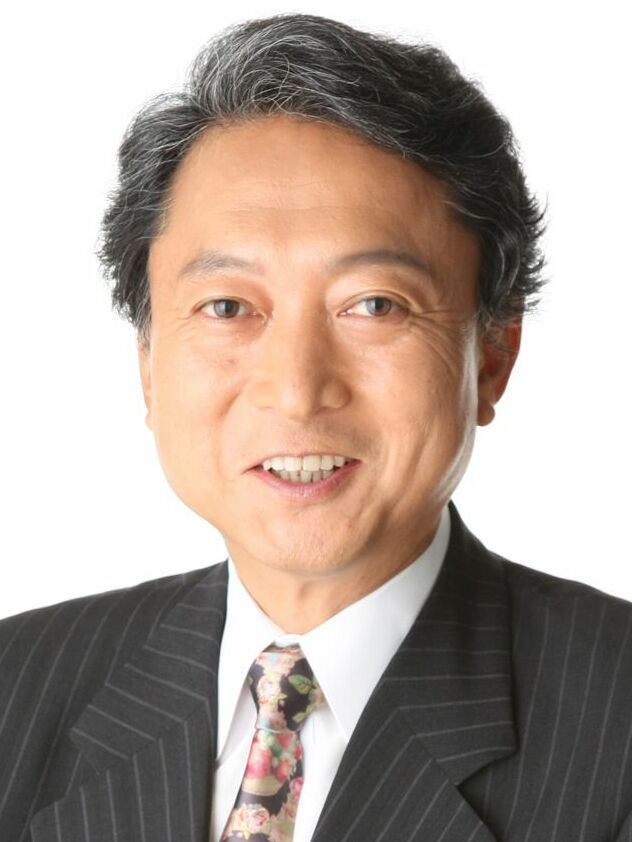

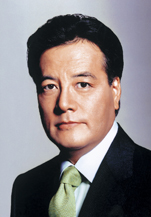
Candidate	Yukio Hatoyama	Katsuya Okada
Leader's seat	Hokkaido 9th	Mie 3rd
Caucus vote	124	95
Percentage	56.6%	43.4%
President before election
Ichirō Ozawa
Elected President
Yukio Hatoyama

The 2009 Democratic Party of Japan leadership election was held on 16 May 2009. The election was held to replace outgoing president Ichirō Ozawa, who resigned in early May after being implicated in a corruption scandal. With an election looming later in the year, his successor would become the party's candidate for Prime Minister.

Yukio Hatoyama was elected leader with 124 votes against opponent Katsuya Okada, who won 95 votes. Hatoyama went on to win the August general election and become Prime Minister.

== Background ==
Ozawa became president of the DPJ in 2006 and was re-elected twice unopposed in September 2006 and September 2008. During his tenure, he forged alliances with other minor opposition parties, and carried the party to victory in the 2007 upper house election, a major blow to the ruling Liberal Democratic Party. The government had struggled since the departure of Prime Minister Junichiro Koizumi, and by 2009 the DPJ was ahead in the polls and stood a good chance of taking power for the first time in that year's general election.

In March, Ozawa's personal secretary was arrested over allegations that he had accepted 35 million yen in illegal donations from the Nishimatsu construction firm. Ozawa denied knowledge or involvement, but came under scrutiny and public pressure. By May, 70% of voters believed he could no longer remain leader. He announced his resignation on 12 May.

== Electoral system ==
Candidates were required to gather endorsements from twenty (maximum 25) of the party's members of the National Diet in order to stand. Each Diet member was eligible to vote (221 total). If no candidate won more than 50% of votes, a runoff was to be held the same day. Nominations were taken on the 16th and the election held the same day.

== Candidates ==
Katsuya Okada, Seiji Maehara, Yukio Hatoyama, and Naoto Kan were considered potential candidates. Of these, Hatoyama and Kan were understood to be closer to Ozawa's course, while Okada and Maehara were reformers.

Candidate	Offices held
Yukio Hatoyama (age 62); Hokkaido	Member of the House of Representatives (1986–); President of the Democratic Party of Japan (1996–97, 1999–2002)
Katsuya Okada (age 55); Mie Prefecture	Member of the House of Representatives (1990–); President of the Democratic Party of Japan (2004–05)

=== Sponsors ===
Yukio Hatoyama (25)	Katsuya Okada (25)
House of Representatives: Hirotaka Akamatsu; Akio Fukuda; Kazuhiro Haraguchi; Takashi Ishizeki; Keiro Kitagami; Tadamasa Kodaira; Yasuko Komiyama; Daizo Kusuda; Jin Matsubara; Hiroko Nakano; Kazumi Ota; Nobutaka Tsutsui; Tsuyoshi Yamaguchi; House of Councillors: Yukihisa Fujita; Wakako Hironaka; Tadashi Inuzuka; Toshiyuki Kato; Minoru Kawasaki; Masao Kobayashi; Kuniko Koda; Hiroe Makiyama; Shunichi Mizuoka; Yukishige Okubo; Kuniko Tanioka; Emiko Uematsu	House of Representatives: Osamu Fujimura; Yoshio Hachiro; Hideo Hiraoka; Ritsuo Hosokawa; Tatsuo Kawabata; Makiko Kikuta; Daisuke Matsumoto; Akira Nagatsuma; Junya Ogawa; Hiroshi Ogushi; Kaname Tajima; Miho Takai; House of Councillors: Shinya Adachi; Yuji Fujimoto; Akira Gunji; Emi Kaneko; Masako Ōkawara; Nobuo Matsuno; Daigo Matsuura; Masashi Mito; Hiroyuki Nagahama; Tomoji Nakatani; Tomiko Okazaki; Chiaki Takahashi; Hisashi Tokunaga

== Contest ==
On the day of Ozawa's resignation, the party executive met to discuss how the contest should be conducted. Akira Nagatsuma and deputy chairman Toshimi Kitazawa, along with Yoshihiko Noda, Jun Azumi, and Tetsuro Fukuyama, favoured expanding the election to include the party grassroots and approved candidates for the upcoming election. They were strongly rebuked by outgoing president Ozawa. Yoko Komiyama and Sumio Mabuchi also suggested holding the leadership election the following week, instead of on Saturday as proposed, in order to "listen to local voices." However, the executive voted to limit the vote to Diet members only and stick to the short timeframe. The Sankei Shimbun quoted internal party critics who accused Ozawa of manipulating the process to maintain control and ensure his favoured candidate, which was believed to be Hatoyama, was successful.

Hatoyama and Okada both announced their candidacies on the 13th. Ozawa's faction and members associated with the former JSP and DSP were understood to be backing Hatoyama, while Okada was supported by the Maehara and Noda factions and part of Naoto Kan's faction. Polling by the Mainichi Shimbun indicated that Okada was preferred by voters by a margin of 25% to 13%, while a survey of lawmakers by The Nikkei found that almost half backed Hatoyama compared to 30% for Okada.

Hatoyama pledged unity and said he would appoint both Ozawa and Okada to key positions, while acknowledging that Ozawa must do more to explain his scandals to the public. Okada attracted some criticism for agreeing with Prime Minister Tarō Asō that a rise in the consumption tax may be necessary in the future, a stance opposed by Hatoyama and Ozawa.

== Results ==
Candidate	Votes	%
Yukio Hatoyama	124	56.6
Katsuya Okada	95	43.4
Total	219	100.00
Invalid	1	
Turnout	220	99.5
Eligible	221	
Source: DPJ Archive
