= 2023 Japanese by-elections =

2023 parliamentary by-elections in japan

In 2023, by-elections were held in Japan in order to fill vacancies in the House of Representatives and the House of Councillors, the two houses of the National Diet of Japan.

== April by-elections ==
On 23 April 2023, 5 by-elections were held together with the second phase of the unified local elections (municipal elections except designated major cities), including Yamaguchi 4th district, the seat of former Prime Minister Shinzo Abe who was assassinated on 8 July 2022.

The ruling Liberal Democratic Party and opposition Japan Innovation Party both made 1 pickup, flipping an independent and a Democratic Party for the People seat respectively.

Constituency	House	Outgoing MP	Party	Member elected	Party	Reason
Chiba 5th district	House of Representatives	Kentaro Sonoura	Independent (elected LDP)	Arfiya Eri	LDP	Resigned on 19 December 2022
Wakayama 1st district	House of Representatives	Shuhei Kishimoto	DPP	Yumi Hayashi	JIP	Resigned on 1 September 2022
Yamaguchi 2nd district	House of Representatives	Nobuo Kishi	LDP	Nobuchiyo Kishi	LDP	Resigned on 3 February 2023
Yamaguchi 4th district	House of Representatives	Shinzo Abe	LDP	Shinji Yoshida	LDP	Assassinated on 8 July 2022
Ōita at-large district	House of Councillors	Kiyoshi Adachi	Independent	Aki Shirasaka	LDP	Resigned on 10 March 2023

== October by-elections ==
The October by-elections were held on 22 October 2023 after Nagasaki 4th district representative Seigo Kitamura's death and the resignation of Tokushima-Kōchi at-large district representative Kojiro Takano after beating his secretary. Both representatives were members of the Liberal Democratic Party.

The LDP lost 1 upper house seat to Independent Hajime Hirota who was backed by opposition parties Constitutional Democratic, Communist, and Social Democratic.

Constituency	House	Outgoing MP	Party	Member elected	Party	Reason
Nagasaki 4th district	House of Representatives	Seigo Kitamura	LDP	Yōzō Kaneko	LDP	Died on 20 May 2023
Tokushima-Kōchi at-large district	House of Councillors	Kōjirō Takano	LDP	Hajime Hirota	Independent	Resigned on 22 June 2023

== See also ==
- Elections in Japan
