= April 2006 Democratic Party of Japan leadership election =

Political party election in Japan

- 7 April 2006
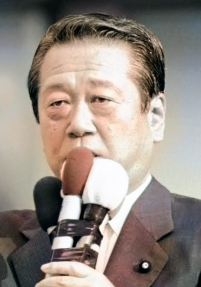

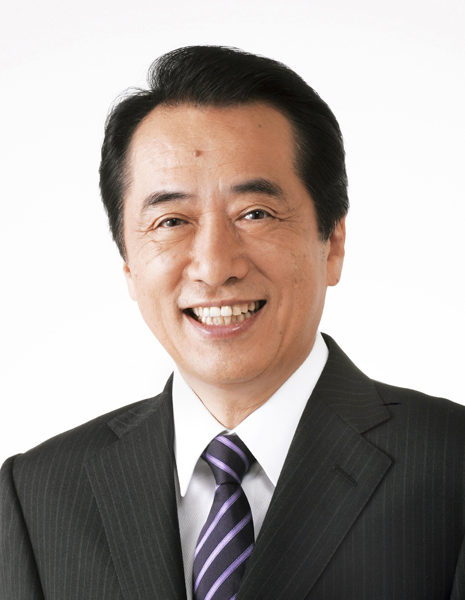
Candidate	Ichirō Ozawa	Naoto Kan
Leader's seat	Iwate 4th	Tokyo 18th
Caucus vote	119	72
Percentage	62.3%	37.7%
President before election
Seiji Maehara
Elected President
Ichirō Ozawa

The April 2006 Democratic Party of Japan leadership election was held on 7 April 2006. The election was held to replace outgoing president Seiji Maehara, who resigned on 31 March. Ichirō Ozawa, former leader of the Liberal Party, defeated former president Naoto Kan by a large margin in the contest.

== Background ==
Seiji Maehara had been elected leader the previous September in a knife's-edge contest with Naoto Kan. In February 2006, DPJ legislator Hisayasu Nagata alleged that the Liberal Democratic Party had taken a 30 million yen bribe from entrepreneur Takafumi Horie, who had been arrested for fraud the previous month, in exchange for supporting for his unsuccessful candidacy in the 2005 election. Maehara gave Nagata the green light to air the allegations; however, the email Nagata used as evidence proved to be fabricated. The DPJ was forced to walk back the accusation, and the party's image and Maehara's position were greatly damaged. He announced his resignation on 31 March.

== Electoral system ==
Candidates were required to gather endorsements from twenty (maximum 25) of the party's members of the National Diet in order to stand. Each Diet member was eligible to vote (192 total). If no candidate won more than 50% of votes, a runoff was to be held the same day. Nominations were taken on the 7th and the election held the same day.

== Candidates ==
Candidate	Offices held
Ichirō Ozawa (age 63); Iwate Prefecture	Member of the House of Representatives (1969–); President of the Liberal Party (1998–2003)
Naoto Kan (age 59); Tokyo	Member of the House of Representatives (1980–); President of the Democratic Party of Japan (1996–99, 2002–04); Minister of Health and Welfare (1996)

=== Sponsors ===
Ichirō Ozawa (25)	Naoto Kan (22)
House of Representatives: Hirotaka Akamatsu; Yutaka Banno; Yoshio Hachiro; Takashi Ishizeki; Tetsundo Iwakuni; Wakio Mitsui; Takashi Nagayasu; Hiroko Nakano; Akihiro Ohata; Tenzo Okumura; Sakihito Ozawa; Hirofumi Ryu; Katsumasa Suzuki; Yoshiaki Takaki; Nobutaka Tsutsui; Masahiko Yamada; House of Councillors: Keiko Chiba; Akira Imaizumi; Takeshi Maeda; Yuko Mori; Motoyuki Odachi; Taisuke Sato; Atsuko Shimoda; Mitsuyoshi Yanagisawa; Susumu Yanase	House of Representatives: Satoshi Arai; Ryuichi Doi; Hideo Hiraoka; Ritsuo Hosokawa; Koichi Kato; Kazuko Kōri; Chinami Nishimura; Ryuzo Sasaki; Yoshinori Suematsu; Manabu Terata; Keisuke Tsumura; Michiyoshi Yunoki; House of Councillors: Toshihiro Asahi; Satsuki Eda; Kenzo Fujisue; Satoru Ienishi; Tadashi Inuzuka; Mototaka Ito; Yoriko Madoka; Toshio Ogawa; Tomiko Okazaki; Yasuo Yamashita

=== Withdrew ===
- Yoshinori Suematsu, member of the House of Representatives (1996–)

== Contest ==
Kan and Ozawa quickly emerged as the main contenders. On the day of Maehara's resignation, Ozawa recorded an interview with Fuji TV stating his willingness to run, which aired on 2 April. Kan stated that he was also eager to stand, and welcomed a contested ballot. Both candidates officially declared on 5 April. Yoshinori Suematsu also announced his intention to run, but withdrew after failing to gather the twenty nominations required to stand. Ozawa was supported by the Hatoyama, ex-DSP, and ex-JSP factions.

An opinion poll conducted on 1–2 April found the two candidates neck and neck in public support: 22.1% favoured Ozawa compared to 21.1% for Kan.

On the eve of the election, a Kan aide admitted "we have been lagging behind" in party support. Both candidates emphasised unity, each pledging to appoint the other to a leadership position should they win.

== Results ==
Candidate	Votes	%
Ichirō Ozawa	119	62.3
Naoto Kan	72	37.7
Total	191	100.00
Invalid	1	
Turnout	192	100.0
Eligible	192	
Source: DPJ Archive

== Aftermath ==
After his victory, Ozawa declared his intention to win the next elections and establish a DPJ government. He pledged to restore public trust in the party. He outlined his policy proposals, saying that the consumption tax revenue should be used to cover part of pensions, nursing, and healthcare for the elderly. He endorsed amending the Constitution and stated his hope for "a friendly relationship based on trust and cooperation" with China.
