= September 2006 Democratic Party of Japan leadership election =

Political party election in Japan

- 25 September 2006
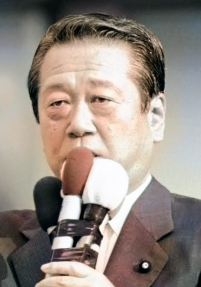
Candidate	Ichirō Ozawa
Leader's seat	Iwate 4th
Result	Unopposed
President before election
Ichirō Ozawa
Elected President
Ichirō Ozawa

The September 2006 Democratic Party of Japan presidential election was held on 25 September 2006 in accordance with the end of the presidential term which had commenced in 2004. Incumbent president Ichirō Ozawa, who took office in April, was re-elected unopposed.

== Background ==
Ozawa was elected president in April, defeating Naoto Kan by a large margin. He sought to unify the party by dividing responsibility, appointing Kan and Yukio Hatoyama to key roles. On 23 April, shortly after taking his post, Ozawa oversaw victory for DPJ candidate Kazumi Ota in the highly anticipated Chiba 7th by-election, a major turnaround in the party's fortunes. The three leaders made public appearances together throughout the year, including a meeting with Chinese premier Hu Jintao in July, promoting a harmonious image.

== Electoral system ==
Candidates were required to gather endorsements from twenty (maximum 25) of the party's members of the National Diet in order to stand.

If it was contested, the election was to be conducted via a points system:

- Each of the party's members of the National Diet had a vote worth two points. (388 points total)
- Registered party members or supporters could vote via mail. Each House of Representative constituency had one point, awarded to the most voted candidate in that constituency. (300 points total)
- Each of the party's members of local councils or prefectural assemblies could vote via mail. Points for this tier were awarded to candidates in proportion to votes won. (100 points total)
- Each of the party's approved candidates for future Diet elections had a vote worth one point. (112 points total)

Nominations were taken on the 12th and the election held the same day. Ozawa was the only candidate to nominate and was therefore confirmed without a ballot.

== Candidates ==
Candidate	Offices held
Ichirō Ozawa (age 64); Iwate Prefecture	Member of the House of Representatives (1969–); President of the Democratic Party of Japan (2006–)

=== Sponsors ===
Ichirō Ozawa (25)
House of Representatives
- Yutaka Banno
- Hitoshi Goto
- Kazuhiro Haraguchi
- Hideo Jinpu
- Koichi Kato
- Yorihisa Matsuno
- Hiroyuki Nagahama
- Atsushi Oshima
- Hirofumi Ryu
- Takahiro Sasaki
- Ryuzo Sasaki
- Yoshito Sengoku
- Keisuke Tsumura
- Nobutaka Tsutsui
- Tsuyoshi Yamaguchi

House of Councillors
- Kumiko Hayashi
- Toshimi Kitazawa
- Naoki Minezaki
- Shunichi Mizuoka
- Yuko Mori
- Motoyuki Odachi
- Toshio Ogawa
- Chiyako Shimada
- Kazuya Shimba
- Ryuji Yamane

== Contest ==
Ozawa was expected to be re-elected unopposed. He was endorsed by Kan and Hatoyama, as well as Yoshihiko Noda and former president Seiji Maehara, who represented junior and mid-ranking legislators who often rebelled against senior leadership. Popular former president Katsuya Okada also declined to stand. Some members advocated for at least a token contest in order to compete with headlines from the Liberal Democratic Party's leadership contest, which was taking place at the same time. Names such as Akira Nagatsuma and Keiichiro Asao were floated, but all chose not to run. Ozawa officially announced his re-election bid on 28 August. Takashi Kawamura sent Toshio Ogawa to represent him at an information session for prospective candidates held on 6 September, but ultimately did not run either.

Ozawa was the only candidate to stand when nominations were taken on 12 September. He was confirmed without a vote at the party convention on 25 September. He declared his biggest goal was to win the 2007 upper house elections the following summer.

Social Democratic Party leader Mizuho Fukushima, People's New Party leader Tamisuke Watanuki, and New Party Nippon leader Yasuo Tanaka attended the convention as guests, indicating Ozawa's intention to coordinate with other opposition parties for upcoming elections.
