= 2023 Yamaguchi 2nd district by-election =

← 2021	23 April 2023	2024 →

Yamaguchi 2nd district
- Turnout: 42.41% (▼9.20 pp)
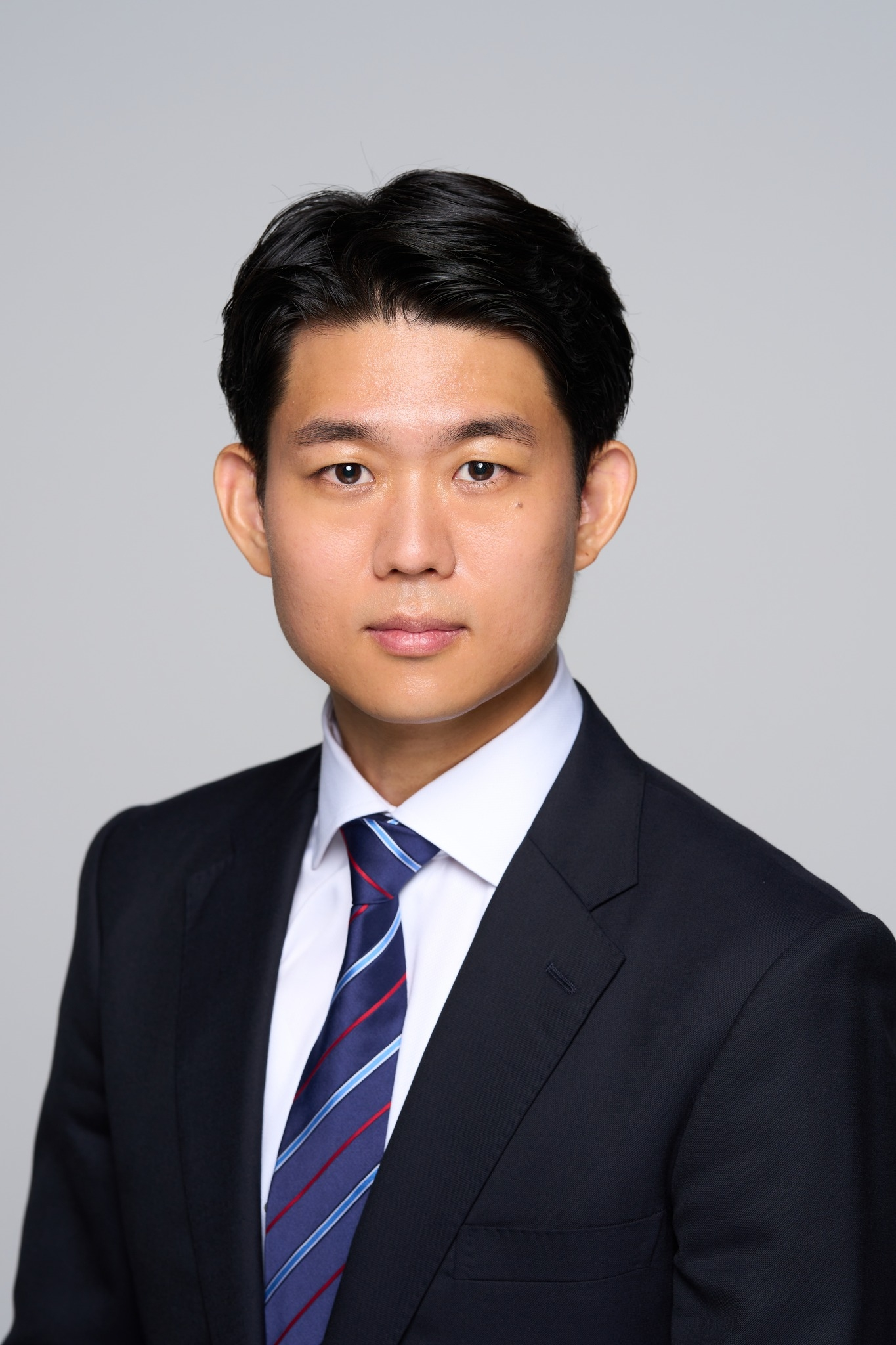

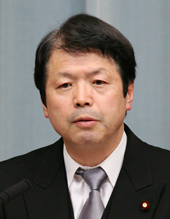
Nominee	Nobuchiyo Kishi	Hideo Hiraoka
Party	LDP	Independent
Popular vote	61,369	55,601
Percentage	52.47%	47.53%
Representative before election
Nobuo Kishi
LDP
Elected Representative
Nobuchiyo Kishi
LDP

2023 Yamaguchi 2nd district by-election was held on 23 April 2023 because Nobuo Kishi resigned as a member of the House of Representatives.

== Background ==
In January 2023, Nobuo Kishi, Special Adviser to the PM, announced his resignation as a member of the House of Representatives, citing his poor physical condition caused by his illness. On February 3, Kishi offered to resign to House of Representatives Speaker Hiroyuki Hosoda.

On February 7, Hosoda allowed Kishi to resign, and a by-election would be held on April 23, 2023, under the Election Law. On the same day, Nobuchiyo Kishi, Kishi's eldest son and one of Kishi’s secretaries, announced his candidacy for the by-election.

== Candidates ==
Name	Age	Party	Career
Nobuchiyo Kishi	31	LDP	Previous offices held: a secretary of Nobuo Kishi
Hideo Hiraoka	69	Independent	Previous offices held: Minister of Justice (2011–2012); Member of the House of Representatives (2000–2012)

== Campaign ==
Kishi ran to take over his father's constituency, but he posted his family tree on his website and was criticized for "nepotism" on Twitter and other social networks. In response to criticism, Kishi removed the family tree from his website.

Although criticized as hereditary, only Tomoko Ishimura of the JCP announced her candidacy in the by-election among the opposition parties, so Kishi's victory seemed certain. However, the situation changes when Hideo Hiraoka, a former Justice Minister who had announced his retirement from politics in 2015, announced his candidacy on March 20.

Hiraoka belonged to the CDP, but by running as an independent candidate, he aimed to gain support from non-partisan groups and other opposition parties, especially the JCP. His aim was successful, and on March 26, the JCP withdrew Ishimura's candidacy and said it would voluntarily support Hiraoka.

With Hiraoka's candidacy, Kishi's dominance collapsed and it became a close race. Senior LDP officials such as Koichi Hagiuda, chairman of the LDP’s policy Affairs research council, rushed to support Kishi, and political officials related to Yamaguchi Prefecture, including Yoshimasa Hayashi, Incumbent Foreign Minister and member of the House of Representatives for Yamaguchi 3rd district.

On the other hand, former PM Naoto Kan, who appointed Hiraoka as the Minister of Justice at the time, and former PM Yukio Hatoyama, rushed to support Hiraoka and criticized Kishi Family's succession.

== Result ==
Kishi defeated Hiraoka by 5,768 votes to win the election for the first time. LDP successfully defended two seats in Yamaguchi Prefecture by also winning the by-election in Yamaguchi 4th district on the same day.

2023 Yamaguchi 2nd district by-election
Party	Candidate	Votes	%	±%
LDP	Nobuchiyo Kishi	61,369	52.47%	−24.47
Independent	Hideo Hiraoka	55,601	47.53%	New
Majority		5,768	4.94%	
Total votes		116,970	100.00%	
LDP hold				

== See also ==
- 2023 Japanese by-elections
