= Matsumiya =

Matsumiya is one of several Japanese surnames and can refer to:

- Isao Matsumiya, Japanese politician
- Takayuki Matsumiya, Japanese long-distance runner
- Mia Matsumiya, American musician
