= Chiba 5th district =

Electoral district in Japan

Chiba 5th District
- 千葉県第4区
- Parliamentary constituency for the Japanese House of Representatives
- Prefecture: Chiba
- Proportional District: Southern Kanto
- Electorate: 413,484 (as of September 2022)

Current constituency
- Created: 1994
- Seats: One
- Party: LDP
- Representative: Arfiya Eri

Chiba 5th District (千葉県第5区, Chiba-ken dai-go-ku) is an electoral district in the Japanese House of Representatives. The district was established in 1994 after the introduction of single-member constituencies in that year. Since its creation it has been redistricted twice: once in 2002 and again in 2022.

Arfiya Eri, a Liberal Democratic Party politician of Uyghur won a by-election on 17 April 2023.

== Areas covered ==
=== Areas covered 2002–2022 ===
- Ichikawa
  - Part of the central government office district
    - Ichikawa 1 – Ichikawa 3, Ichikawaminami, Mama 1-3, Shinden, Hirata, Yawata, Minami-yawata, Sugano, Higashi-Kanno, Higashihama 1, Tajiri, Takaya, Takaya Shinmachi, Baraki, Futamta, Futamata Shinmachi, Kamimyouden
- Urayasu

=== Areas covered before 2002 ===
From its establishment in 1994 until its first redistricting in 2002, the areas covered by the district were as follows:

- Ichikawa (just the districts of Gyotoku and the Ichikawa Government district)
- Urayasu

== List of representatives ==
Election	Representative	Party	Notes
1996	Kou Tanaka	Democratic	Elected mayor of Ichikawa City in 2022
2000	Kou Tanaka	Democratic	Elected mayor of Ichikawa City in 2022
2003	Hirotami Murakoshi	Democratic	
2005	Kentaro Sonoura	Liberal Democratic	
2009	Hirotami Murakoshi	Democratic	Mayor of Ichikawa City in 2018 – 2022
2012	Kentaro Sonoura	Liberal Democratic	Resigned on 21 December 2022
2014	Kentaro Sonoura	Liberal Democratic	Resigned on 21 December 2022
2017	Kentaro Sonoura	Liberal Democratic	Resigned on 21 December 2022
2021	Kentaro Sonoura	Liberal Democratic	Resigned on 21 December 2022
Vacant (December 2022–April 2023)
2023 by-el	Arfiya Eri	Liberal Democratic	
2024	Kentarō Yazaki	CDP	
2026	Arfiya Eri	Liberal Democratic	

== Election results ==
‡ - Also ran in the South Kanto PR block election

2026
Party	Candidate	Votes	%	±%
LDP	Arfiya Eri^{‡}	85,073	36.5	▲8.8
DPP	Junko Okano^{‡} (elected in S. Kanto PR block)	53,532	22.9	▼0.7
Centrist Reform	Kentarō Yazaki^{‡}	47,990	20.6	▼10.0
Team Mirai	Shūhei Kobayashi^{‡} (elected in S. Kanto PR block)	25,408	10.9	
Sanseitō	Jun'ichi Miyaji	21,386	9.2	▲4.3
Registered electors		416,930		
Turnout			57.02	▲3.81
LDP gain from Centrist Reform				

2024
Party	Candidate	Votes	%	±%
CDP	Kentarō Yazaki^{‡}	66,031	30.60	▲3.01
LDP	Arfiya Eri^{‡} (elected in PR block)	59,636	27.63	▼2.85
DPP	Junko Okano^{‡} (elected in PR block)	51,033	23.65	▲8.63
Ishin	Tomoyasu Kishino^{‡}	17,615	8.16	▼5.72
JCP	Masato Sakurai	11,015	5.10	▼2.37
Sanseitō	Jun'ichi Miyaji	10,490	4.86	New
Registered electors		414,963		
Turnout			53.21	▲14.96
CDP gain from LDP				

2023
Party	Candidate	Votes	%	±%
LDP	Arfiya Eri	50,578	30.58	▼16.39
CDP	Kentarō Yazaki	45,635	27.59	▼1.72
DPP	Junko Okano	24,842	15.02	▲4.83
Ishin	Tomoyasu Kishino	22,952	13.88	▲0.36
JCP	Kazuko Saitō	12,360	7.47	▼6.78
Independent	Kentaro Hoshi	6,561.599	3.97	New
Seijika Joshi	Mitsue Oda	2,463	1.49	New
Registered electors		451,273		
Turnout			38.25	▼15.82
LDP hold				

2021
Party	Candidate	Votes	%	±%
LDP	Kentaro Sonoura^{‡}	111,985.611	46.97	▼4.05
CDP	Kentaro Yazaki^{‡}	69,887.387	29.31	New
Ishin	Tamotsu Shīki^{‡}	32,241	13.52	New
DPP	Atsushi Tokita^{‡}	24,307	10.19	New
Registered electors		450,365		
Turnout			54.07	▲4.96
LDP hold				

2017
Party	Candidate	Votes	%	±%
LDP	Kentaro Sonoura^{‡}	107,299	51.02	▼2.78
CDP	Atsushi Yamada^{‡}	62,894	29.91	New
Kibō no Tō	Junko Okano^{‡}	40,115	19.07	New
Registered electors		438,691		
Turnout			49.11	▼0.09
LDP hold				

2014
Party	Candidate	Votes	%	±%
LDP	Kentaro Sonoura^{‡}	105,941	53.80	▲18.49
Democratic	Hirotami Murakoshi^{‡}	57,500	29.20	▲7.09
JCP	Fumiko Asano^{‡}	28,055	14.25	▲8.82
Independent Politician	Kazuo Ishida	5,411	2.75	New
Registered electors		415,510		
Turnout			49.20	▼8.66
LDP hold				
