= Aichi 8th district =

Legislative district in Japan

Aichi 8th District
- Parliamentary constituency for the Japanese House of Representatives
- Numbered map of Aichi Prefecture single-member districts
- Prefecture: Aichi
- Proportional District: Tōkai
- Electorate: 437,388

Current constituency
- Created: 1994
- Seats: One
- Party: LDP
- Representative: Tadahiko Ito
- Municipalities: Handa, Tokoname, Tōkai, Chita, and Chita District

Aichi 8th district (愛知県第8区, Aichi-ken dai-hachiku or simply 愛知8区, Aichi-hakku) is a single-member constituency of the House of Representatives, the lower house of the national Diet of Japan.

== List of representatives ==
Election	Representative	Party	Notes
1996	Tōichirō Kuno	LDP	
2000	Hiroshi Ōki	LDP	
2003	Yutaka Banno	Democratic	
2005	Tadahiko Ito	LDP	
2009	Yutaka Banno	Democratic	
2012	Tadahiko Ito	LDP	
2014	Tadahiko Ito	LDP	
2017	Tadahiko Ito	LDP	
2021	Tadahiko Ito	LDP	
2024	Yutaka Banno	CDP	
2026	Tadahiko Ito	LDP	

== Election results ==
2026
Party	Candidate	Votes	%	±%
LDP	Tadahiko Ito	131,050	52.8	▲11.5
Centrist Reform	Yutaka Banno (incumbent)	84,571	34.1	▼15.6
CPJ	Kenichi Nakagawa	32,396	13.1	
Registered electors		429,573		
Turnout			59.18	▲3.77
LDP gain from Centrist Reform				

2024
Party	Candidate	Votes	%	±%
CDP	Yutaka Banno	115,282	49.71	▼0.07
Liberal Democratic (endorsed by Komeito)	Tadahiko Ito (incumbent) (elected by Tōkai PR block)	95,844	41.33	▼8.89
Communist	Hiroaki Furukawa	20.788	8.96	New
Majority		19,438	8.38	▲7.94
Registered electors		432,228		
Turnout		231,925	55.41	▼1.12
CDP gain from LDP				

2021
Party	Candidate	Votes	%	±%
Liberal Democratic	Tadahiko Ito (Incumbent)	121,714	50.22	▲4.07
CDP	Yutaka Banno (elected by Tōkai PR block)	120,649	49.78	New
Registered electors		437,624		
Turnout			56.53	▲1.87
LDP hold				

2017
Party	Candidate	Votes	%	±%
Liberal Democratic	Tadahiko Ito (Incumbent)	108,477	46.15	▼1.42
Independent	Yutaka Banno (Incumbent-Tōkai PR block)	106,625	45.37	New
Communist	Tadahiro Nagatomo	19,931	8.48	▼1.00
Registered electors		439,060		
Turnout			54.66	▼0.96
LDP hold				

2014
Party	Candidate	Votes	%	±%
Liberal Democratic	Tadahiko Ito (Incumbent)	109,723	47.57	▲0.84
Democratic	Yutaka Banno (elected by Tōkai PR block)	99,058	42.95	▲10.12
Communist	Tadahiro Nagatomo	21,859	9.48	▲2.60
Registered electors		425,151		
Turnout			55.62	▼4.64
LDP hold				

2012
Party	Candidate	Votes	%	±%
Liberal Democratic	Tadahiko Ito	115,407	46.73	▲8.59
Democratic	Yutaka Banno (Incumbent)	81,078	32.83	▼27.32
Tomorrow	Narumi Masuda	33,693	13.64	New
Communist	Tadahiro Nagatomo	16,806	6.80	▲1.46
Registered electors		422,291		
Turnout			60.26	▼9.94
LDP gain from Democratic				

2009
Party	Candidate	Votes	%	±%
Democratic	Yutaka Banno (Incumbent-Tōkai PR block)	172,839	60.15	▲17.29
Liberal Democratic	Tadahiko Ito (Incumbent)	109,582	38.14	▼7.73
Happiness Realization	Hidenori Kosako	4,907	1.71	New
Registered electors		417,869		
Turnout			70.20	▲2.76
Democratic gain from LDP				

2005
Party	Candidate	Votes	%	±%
Liberal Democratic	Tadahiko Ito	123,280	45.87	▲6.76
Democratic	Yutaka Banno (Incumbent) (elected by Tōkai PR block)	115,200	42.86	▼11.16
New Party Nippon	Yūsuke Morita	15,943	5.93	New
Communist	Tōru Kamiya	14,362	5.34	▼1.53
Registered electors		404,948		
Turnout			67.44	▲6.74
LDP gain from Democratic				

2003
Party	Candidate	Votes	%	±%
Democratic	Yutaka Banno (Incumbent-Tōkai PR block)	127,411	54.02	▲19.06
Liberal Democratic	Hiroshi Ōki (Incumbent)	92,245	39.11	▲3.88
Communist	Tōru Kamiya	16,216	6.87	▼0.77
Turnout			60.70	
Registered electors		398,033		
Democratic gain from LDP				

2000
Party	Candidate	Votes	%	±%
Liberal Democratic	Hiroshi Ōki	84,641	35.23	▼9.20
Democratic	Yutaka Banno (Incumbent) (elected by Tōkai PR block)	83,988	34.96	New
Assembly of Independents	Yūsuke Morita	52,046	21.66	New
Communist	Isamu Kajiura	18,357	7.64	▼3.42
Liberal	Shuji Sekiguchi	1,199	0.50	New
Turnout				
LDP hold				

1996
Party	Candidate	Votes	%	±%
Liberal Democratic	Tōichiro Kuno	93,053	44.43	New
New Frontier	Yūsuke Morita	90,099	43.02	New
Communist	Isamu Kajiura	23,166	11.06	New
Culture Forum	Kazuko Yamazaki	2,259	1.08	New
Independent	Kenichi Shimoda	873	0.42	New
Turnout				
