= Sachiko Hirayama =

Japanese politician (born 1971)

- 平山 佐知子
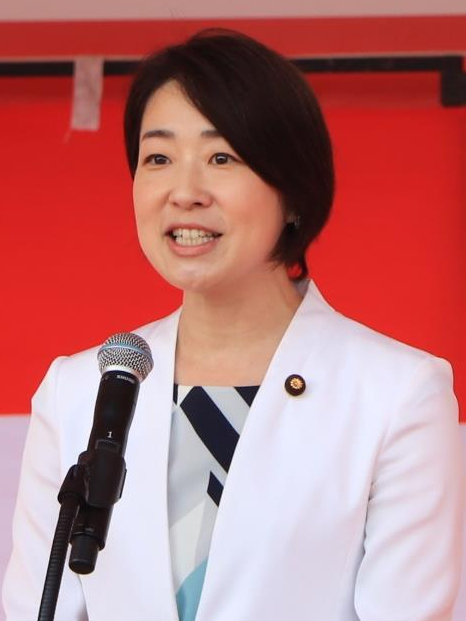
- Hirayama in 2023

Member of the House of Councillors
- Incumbent
- Assumed office 26 July 2016
- Preceded by: Yuji Fujimoto
- Constituency: Shizuoka at-large

Personal details
- Born: 3 January 1971 (age 55) Kanbara, Shizuoka, Japan
- Party: Independent (since 2017)
- Other political affiliations: DPJ (2015–2016); DP (2016–2017)
- Education: Nihon Fukushi University

Sachiko Hirayama (born January 3, 1971, in Shizuoka Prefecture) is a Japanese politician who has served as a member of the House of Councillors of Japan since 2016. She represents the Shizuoka at-large district and is an independent.

She is a member of the following committees (as of 2021):

- Committee on Environment
