= Masanao Ozaki =

Japanese politician

- 尾崎 正直
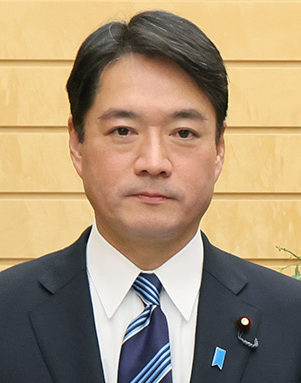
- 2024

Deputy Chief Cabinet Secretary (Political affairs, House of Representatives)
- Incumbent
- Assumed office 21 October 2025
- Prime Minister: Sanae Takaichi
- Preceded by: Keiichiro Tachibana

Member of the House of Representatives
- Incumbent
- Assumed office 3 November 2021
- Preceded by: Hajime Hirota
- Constituency: Kōchi 2nd

Governor of Kōchi Prefecture
- In office 7 December 2007 – 6 December 2019
- Monarchs: Akihito; Naruhito
- Preceded by: Daijiro Hashimoto
- Succeeded by: Seiji Hamada

Personal details
- Born: 14 September 1967 (age 59) Kōchi City, Kōchi, Japan
- Party: LDP (since 2020)
- Other political affiliations: Independent (before 2020)
- Education: University of Tokyo

Masanao Ozaki (尾崎 正直, Ozaki Masanao; born 14 September 1967 in Kōchi, Kōchi) is a Japanese politician who has been serving as a member of the House of Representatives since 2021.

== Career ==
He graduated from University of Tokyo with the Bachelor of Economics degree in 1991 and a former bureaucrat of the Ministry of the Treasury (now the Ministry of Finance). He worked in the Ministry of Foreign Affairs from 1998 to 2000. He worked as a secretary in the Embassy of Japan in Indonesia (firstly, Second Secretary and from 2001, First Secretary). He served as a secretary of the Deputy Chief Cabinet Secretary from 2006. He retired from the Ministry of Finance in October 2007.

He ran and was elected governor of Kochi Prefecture in 2007.

After serving as governor for three terms and 12 years, he announced his candidacy for the Lower House general election. He ran for Kōchi 2nd district from the Liberal Democratic Party and was first elected to the House of Representatives after defeating Hajime Hirota, an incumbent member of the House of Representatives of the CDP.
