= Arfiya Eri =

Japanese politician (born 1988)

- 英利 アルフィヤ
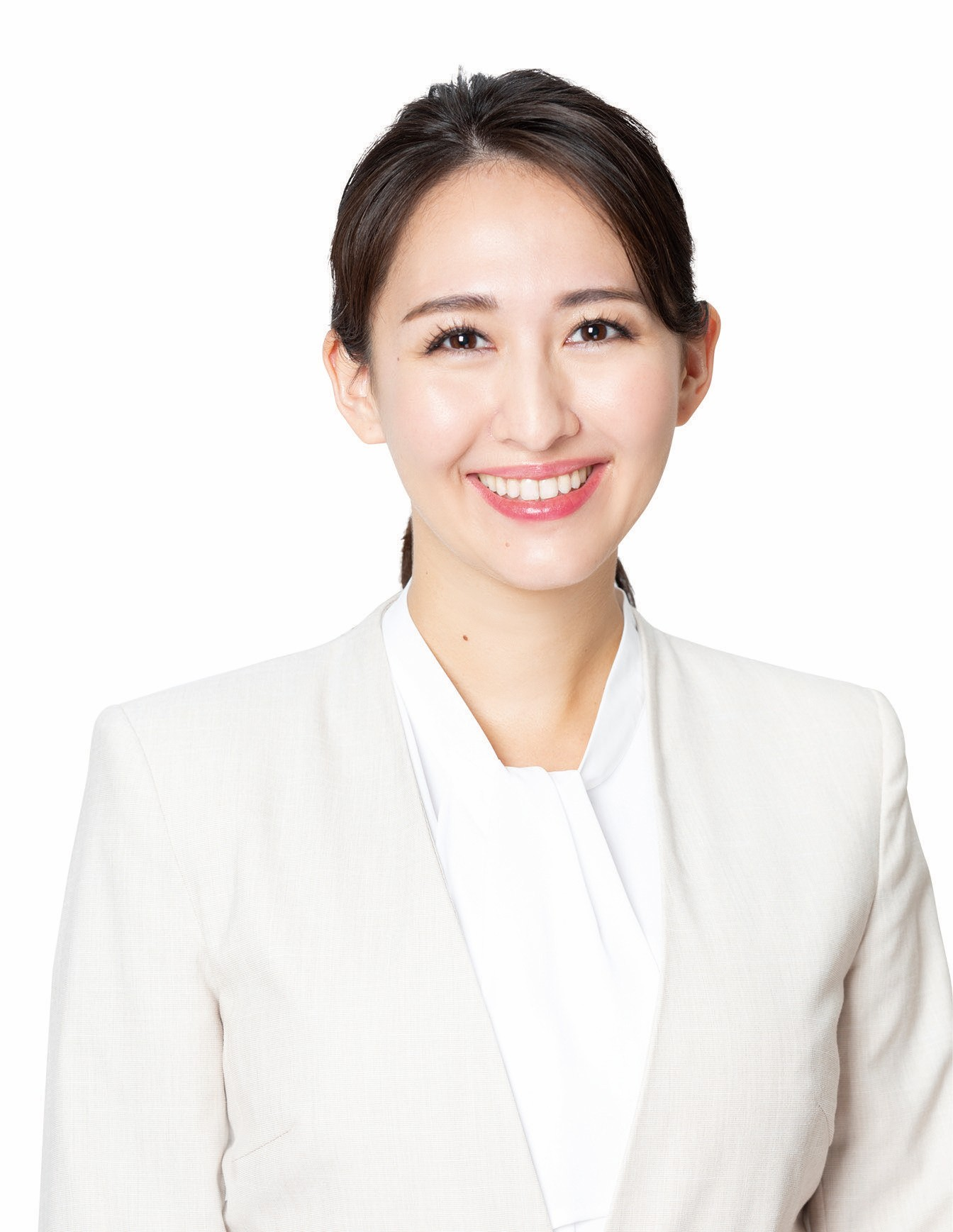
- Official portrait, 2025

Member of the House of Representatives; from Southern Kanto
- Incumbent
- Assumed office 23 April 2023
- Preceded by: Kentaro Sonoura
- Constituency: Chiba 5th (2023–2024); PR block (2024–2026); Chiba 5th (2026–present)

Personal details
- Born: 16 October 1988 (age 37) Kitakyushu, Fukuoka Prefecture, Japan
- Party: Liberal Democratic (Shikōkai)
- Education: Georgetown University
- Website: eri-arfiya.jp

Japanese name
- Kanji: 英利 アルフィヤ
- Hiragana: えり あるふぃあ
Transcriptions
- Romanization: Eri Arufiya

Chinese name
- Simplified Chinese: 英利·阿丽菲亚
- Traditional Chinese: 英利·阿麗菲亞
Transcriptions
Standard Mandarin
- Hanyu Pinyin: Yīnglì Ālìfēiyà

Uyghur name
- Uyghur: ئارفىيە ئابلەت
Transcriptions
- Latin Yëziqi: Arfiye Ablet
- SASM/GNC: Arfiyä Ablät

Uzbek name
- Uzbek: Arfiya Ablat / Арфия Аблат

Arfiya Eri (Note: Japanese: 英利 アルフィヤ, Hepburn: Eri Arufiya) (born 16 October 1988), also known by her Turkic name Arfiya Ablat, (Note: Uyghur: ئارفىيە ئابلەت, romanized: Arfiye Ablet; Uzbek: Arfiya Ablat) is a Japanese politician of Uyghur and Uzbek descent. She is a member of the House of Representatives for the Liberal Democratic Party.

== Biography ==
=== Early life and education ===
She was born to a Uyghur father and Uzbek mother in Kitakyushu, Fukuoka Prefecture. She moved to Shanghai at age 10 and Guangzhou at age 11 due to her father's work relocation, and attended the Shanghai American School and the American International School of Guangzhou, where she was elected president of the student body. She graduated from Georgetown University's Walsh School of Foreign Service and Graduate School of Foreign Service in Washington, D.C.

=== Political career ===
Eri previously spent time as an official for the Bank of Japan and the United Nations.

She ran unsuccessfully as an LDP candidate in the 2022 Japanese House of Councillors election. In April 2023, she was elected to the Japanese House of Representatives in a by-election for Chiba's 5th district.

Eri supported fellow Georgetown alumni Taro Kono, the then Minister for Digital Transformation, in the 2024 LDP presidential election, which Shigeru Ishiba ultimately won. She was appointed Parliamentary Vice-Minister for Foreign Affairs as part of Ishiba's cabinet in November 2024.

== Personal life ==
Eri's first language is Japanese, but she is also able to communicate in English, Chinese, Uzbek, Turkish and Uyghur along with a basic level of Arabic Language.

== Political positions ==
She has described her policies as in line with most mainstream LDP positions. She has been vocal about her support for initiatives to promote gender equality in Japan. Eri has noted that young female politicians are rare in Japan, saying in July 2022, when she was 33 years old: "We need better representation – we need young people to feel that they are being represented, that the future is in their hands. Right now, a lot of antagonism comes from the fact that most of the politicians look the same to them."

Eri is strongly anti-authoritarian, a position she says is shaped by China's human rights abuses against Uyghurs in Xinjiang.
