= Seiji Hamada =

Japanese politician

- 浜田 省司

Governor of Kōchi Prefecture
- Incumbent
- Assumed office December 7, 2019
- Monarch: Naruhito
- Preceded by: Masanao Ozaki

Vice Governor of Osaka Prefecture
- In office July 2017 – December 7, 2019

Personal details
- Born: January 23, 1963 (age 63) Nakamura, Kōchi, Japan
- Party: Independent
- Children: 2
- Education: University of Tokyo

Seiji Hamada (浜田省司, Hamada Seiji; born 23 January 1963) is a Japanese politician. He currently serves as governor of Kōchi Prefecture since 2019.

== Biography ==
Hamada was born on January 23, 1963, in then Nakamura (now Shimanto), Kōchi Prefecture. He graduated from Tosa Middle School in 1978. He graduated from Tosa High School in 1981. He is graduated from the University of Tokyo, Faculty of Law in 1985. He became the vice governor of the Osaka Prefecture from 2017 to 2019.

== Personal life ==
Hamada is married and has two daughters.
