= Hajime Hirota =

Japanese politician

- 広田 一
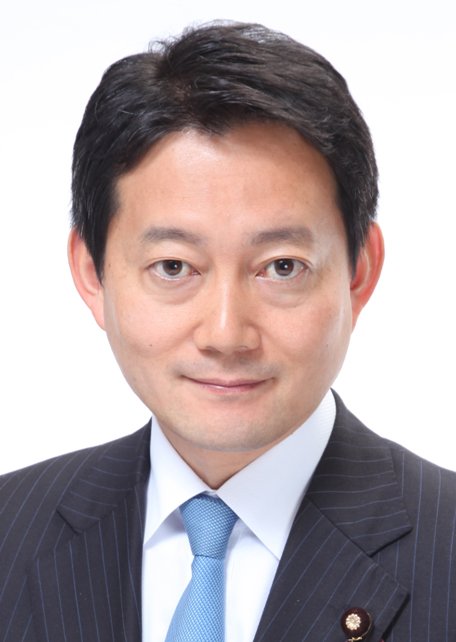
- Official portrait, 2021

Member of the House of Councillors
- Incumbent
- Assumed office 22 October 2023
- Preceded by: Kojiro Takano
- Constituency: Tokushima-Kōchi at-large
- In office 26 July 2004 – 25 July 2016
- Preceded by: Kojiro Takano
- Succeeded by: Constituency abolished
- Constituency: Kōchi at-large

Member of the House of Representatives
- In office 22 October 2017 – 14 October 2021
- Preceded by: Yūji Yamamoto
- Succeeded by: Masanao Ozaki
- Constituency: Kōchi 2nd

Member of the Kōchi Prefectural Assembly
- In office 1995–2001
- Constituency: Tosashimizu City

Personal details
- Born: 10 October 1968 (age 58) Tosashimizu, Kōchi, Japan
- Party: CDP (since 2020)
- Other political affiliations: LDP (1995–2001); Independent (2001–2009; 2017–2020); DPJ (2009–2016); DP (2016–2017)
- Education: University of Waseda

Hajime Hirota (広田 一, Hirota Hajime; born October 10, 1968) is a Japanese politician of the Constitutional Democratic Party and a member of the House of Councillors in the National Diet since 2023, having previously served from 2004 until 2016. He previously served two terms in the Kōchi Prefectural Assembly from 1995 until 2001.

In 2015 changes to the electoral laws merged Hirota's Kōchi at-large district with the neighbouring Tokushima district, in order to address the problem of disparity in the representation of urban and rural areas. In October 2015 Hirota announced that he would not contest the merged Tokushima-Kōchi at-large district at the 2016 election as a protest against the merger. In June 2016 it was reported that Hirota would instead contest one of Kochi Prefecture's districts at the next House of Representatives election, to be held by the end of 2018. His decision meant that no candidates that contested the new district were born in Kochi Prefecture.
