= Tadahiko Ito =

Japanese politician

- 伊藤 忠彦
- Official portrait, 2024

Minister for Reconstruction
- In office 1 October 2024 – 21 October 2025
- Prime Minister: Shigeru Ishiba
- Preceded by: Shinako Tsuchiya
- Succeeded by: Takao Makino

Member of the House of Representatives
- Incumbent
- Assumed office 18 December 2012
- Preceded by: Yutaka Banno
- Constituency: Aichi 8th (2012–2024); Tōkai PR (2024–2026); Aichi 8th (2026–present)
- In office 12 September 2005 – 21 July 2009
- Preceded by: Yutaka Banno
- Succeeded by: Yutaka Banno
- Constituency: Aichi 8th

Member of the Aichi Prefectural Assembly
- In office 30 April 1999 – 30 August 2005
- Constituency: Chita City

Personal details
- Born: 11 July 1964 (age 62) Nagoya, Aichi, Japan
- Party: Liberal Democratic
- Other political affiliations: New Party Sakigake
- Education: Waseda University

Tadahiko Ito (伊藤 忠彦, Itō Tadahiko; born 11 July 1964) is a Japanese politician of the Liberal Democratic Party, a member of the House of Representatives in the Diet (national legislature).

== Early life ==
Ito is a native of Nagoya, Aichi and graduated from Waseda University. He began his political career by serving in the Aichi Prefectural Assembly from 1999 to 2005 and was first elected to the House of Representatives in 2005. He has since been re-elected multiple times. In October 2024, he was appointed Minister for Reconstruction in the cabinet of Prime Minister Shigeru Ishiba. His areas of focus include disaster prevention, environmental policy, and public infrastructure development."

== Political career ==
Ito was elected to the first of his two terms in the Aichi Prefectural Assembly in 1999 and then to the House of Representatives for the first time in 2005, representing the Aichi 8th constituency. He lost the seat in the 2009 election but was reelected in 2012. As of 2024, he remains a member of the House of Representatives, holding a seat as a Tōkai proportional representation member.

In October 2024, Ito was appointed Minister for Reconstruction in the Shigeru Ishiba cabinet. He is part of the group of incoming representatives commonly referred to as the “Koizumi Children.”

== See also ==
- Koizumi Children
