= Norio Takeuchi =

Japanese politician

- 武内 則男

Member of the House of Representatives
- In office 27 October 2017 – 14 October 2021
- Constituency: Shikoku PR

Member of the House of Councillors
- In office 29 July 2007 – 28 July 2013
- Preceded by: Kōhei Tamura
- Succeeded by: Kojiro Takano
- Constituency: Kōchi at-large

Member of the Kōchi City Council
- In office 2003–2007

Personal details
- Born: 8 September 1958 (age 67) Mihara, Kōchi, Japan
- Party: CDP (since 2017)
- Other political affiliations: DPJ (2007–2016); DP (2016–2017)

Norio Takeuchi (武内 則男, Takeuchi Norio; born 1958) is a former Japanese politician belonging to the Constitutional Democratic Party of Japan. He served as a member of the House of Representatives in the Diet (national legislature) for Shikoku.

== Early life ==
Takeuchi is a native of Mihara, Kōchi. He is a high school graduate.

== Political career ==
Takeuchi served as a House of Councillors member from 2007 to 2013. He was previously a member in the city assembly of Kōchi from 2007 to 2013.
