= Yukiko Sakamoto =

Japanese politician

- 坂本 由紀子

Member of the House of Councillors
- In office 26 July 2004 – 17 June 2009
- Preceded by: Yoshihiko Yamashita
- Succeeded by: Hirokazu Tsuchida
- Constituency: Shizuoka at-large

Parliamentary Secretary of Foreign Affairs
- In office 29 August 2007 – 3 September 2007 Serving with Yasuhide Nakayama, Osamu Uno
- Preceded by: Midori Matsushima, Masakazu Sekiguchi, Masayoshi Hamada
- Succeeded by: Masakatsu Koike

Vice-Governor of Shizuoka Prefecture
- In office 1996–1999
- Governor: Yoshinobu Ishikawa

Personal details
- Born: 20 January 1949 (age 77) Mishima, Shizuoka, Japan
- Party: Liberal Democratic
- Education: Bachelor of Laws
- Alma mater: University of Tokyo
- Occupation: Ministry of Health, Labour and Welfare bureaucrat

Yukiko Sakamoto (坂本 由紀子, Sakamoto Yukiko; born 20 January 1949) is a Japanese politician and bureaucrat from Mishima, Shizuoka. She was the first woman to be appointed vice-governor of Shizuoka Prefecture in 1996 and served one term in the House of Councillors in the National Diet from 2004 until 2009.

== Early life and bureaucratic career ==
Sakamoto was born in Mishima, Shizuoka Prefecture, and graduated from Numazu Higashi High School in the neighbouring city of Numazu. She graduated from the University of Tokyo with a Bachelor of Laws.

In 1972 Sakamoto joined the Ministry of Labor (now part of Ministry of Health, Labour and Welfare), serving in the Women Labourers' section of the Women's Bureau. She later transferred to the Employment Security Bureau, where she served as head of the policy section for employment of the disabled. In 1996 Sakamoto was seconded to the post of Vice-Governor of Shizuoka Prefecture, becoming the first woman vice-governor of the prefecture. She served in that role until 1999.

Following her term as Vice-Governor, Sakamoto returned to the Ministry and served as an Assistant Secretary to the Minister until 2001, then as head of the Occupational Health and Safety Department. Sakamoto finally served as head of the Human Resources Development Bureau from 2002 until her resignation from the ministry in 2004.

== Political career ==
In July 2004 Sakamoto was elected to the House of Councillors as a Liberal Democratic Party candidate in the Shizuoka at-large district. Sakamoto received the most votes in a five-person contest for two seats, defeating incumbent Councillors Yoshihiko Yamashita of the LDP and Tōru Unno of the Democratic Party. Upon entering the Diet Sakamoto served on the House's Health, Welfare and Labour Committee and later in July 2007 was appointed as a director of the House's Budget Committee.

In August 2007 Sakamoto was appointed as a parliamentary secretary of Foreign Affairs in the cabinet of Prime Minister Shinzō Abe. However, immediately after her appointment an allegation concerning improper accounting of expenses was raised and led to Sakamoto resigning from the post one week after her appointment. She was replaced in the position by Masakatsu Koike.

In June 2009 Sakamoto resigned from the House of Councillors to contest the Shizuoka gubernatorial election the following month. Sakamoto contested the election as an independent candidate, but with the backing of the LDP and Komeito. Aware of the low popularity of the LDP's national government led by Prime Minister Tarō Asō, Sakamoto tried to distance herself from the party and ran on a campaign of the "prefecture people's party". Sakamoto received 713,654 votes (38.8%), but was defeated by Democratic Party candidate Heita Kawakatsu by a margin of 15,052 votes. The result was a precursor to the defeat of Aso and the LDP in the national general election held the following month.
