= Yūsuke Nakanishi =

Japanese politician (born 1979)

- 中西 祐介
- Official portrait, 2021

Deputy Chief Cabinet Secretary (Political affairs, House of Councillors)
- Incumbent
- Assumed office 17 September 2026
- Prime Minister: Sanae Takaichi
- Preceded by: Kei Satō

Member of the House of Councillors
- Incumbent
- Assumed office 26 July 2010
- Preceded by: Masakatsu Koike
- Constituency: Tokushima at-large (2010–2016); Tokushima-Kōchi at-large (2016–present)

Personal details
- Born: 12 July 1979 (age 47) Anan, Tokushima, Japan
- Party: Liberal Democratic
- Education: Keio University

Yūsuke Nakanishi (born 12 July 1979) is a Japanese politician who is a member of the House of Councillors of Japan.

== Biography ==
He was educated at Keio University. In 2010, he was elected to the house of councillors and was re-elected in 2016 and 2022.
