= Shizuoka at-large district =

Japan House of Councillors constituency

- 静岡県選挙区
- Parliamentary constituency for the House of Councillors
- Prefecture: Shizuoka
- Electorate: 3,016,115 (as of September 2022)

Current constituency
- Created: 1947
- Seats: 4
- Councillors: Class of 2019: Takao Makino (LDP); Kazuya Shimba (DPP); Class of 2022: Yohei Wakabayashi (LDP); Sachiko Hirayama (Ind.)

The Shizuoka at-large district (Japanese: 静岡県選挙区, Hepburn: Shizuoka-ken senkyoku) is a constituency that represents Shizuoka Prefecture in the House of Councillors in the Diet of Japan. It has four Councillors in the 242-member house.

== Outline ==
The constituency represents the entire population of Shizuoka Prefecture. Since its inception in 1947, the district has elected four Councillors to six-year terms, two at alternating elections held every three years. The district has 3,052,579 registered voters as of September 2015. The Councillors currently representing Shizuoka are:

- Yuji Fujimoto (Democratic Party (DP), second term; term ends in 2016)
- Shigeki Iwai (Liberal Democratic Party (LDP), first term; term ends in 2016)
- Takao Makino (LDP, second term; term ends in 2019)
- Kazuya Shimba (DP, third term; term ends in 2019)

== Elected Councillors ==
Class of 1947		election year	Class of 1950 (3-year term in 1947)	
Toyohisa Morita (Liberal)	Kaichi Kawakami (Centrist) (Note: Later joined Ryokufūkai)	1947	Yahachi Kawai (Ryokufūkai) (Note: First elected as an independent.)	Ichizo Hiraoka (Note: Died in office 20 march 1952.) (Liberal)
Toyohisa Morita (Liberal)	Kaichi Kawakami (Centrist)	1950	Yahachi Kawai (Ryokufūkai)	Ichizo Hiraoka (Liberal)
Toyohisa Morita (Liberal)	Kaichi Kawakami (Centrist)	1952 by-election (Note: Held 6 May 1952)	Yahachi Kawai (Ryokufūkai)	Tadaatsu Ishiguro (Ryokufūkai)
Toyohisa Morita (Liberal)	Takeji Kobayashi (LDP) (Note: First elected as an independent.)	1953	Yahachi Kawai (Ryokufūkai)	Tadaatsu Ishiguro (Ryokufūkai)
Toyohisa Morita (Liberal)	Takeji Kobayashi (LDP)	1956	Manpei Suzuki (LDP)	Chuji Matsunaga (Social Democratic)
Masataka Ota (LDP)	Takeji Kobayashi (LDP)	1959	Manpei Suzuki (LDP)	Chuji Matsunaga (Social Democratic)
Masataka Ota (LDP)	Takeji Kobayashi (LDP)	1962	Manpei Suzuki (LDP)	Yuko Kurihara (Note: Resigned 13 November 1972 to contest the December general election for the House of Representatives) (LDP)
Chuji Matsunaga (Social Democratic)	Takeji Kobayashi (LDP)	1965	Manpei Suzuki (LDP)	Yuko Kurihara (LDP)
Chuji Matsunaga (Social Democratic)	Takeji Kobayashi (LDP)	1968	Keisaburo Yamamoto (LDP)	Yuko Kurihara (LDP)
Chuji Matsunaga (Social Democratic)	Shizu Kawanobe (LDP)	1971	Keisaburo Yamamoto (LDP)	Yuko Kurihara (LDP)
Chuji Matsunaga (Social Democratic)	Shizu Kawanobe (LDP)	1972 by-election (Note: Held 10 December 1972)	Keisaburo Yamamoto (LDP)	Toshio Saito (LDP)
Chuji Matsunaga (Social Democratic)	Shizu Kawanobe (LDP)	1974	Shinya Tozuka (Note: Resigned 18 November 1983 to contest the December general election for the House of Representatives) (LDP)	Shinji Aoki (Social Democratic)
Buichi Katsumata (Social Democratic)	Hiroshi Kumagai (LDP)	1977	Shinya Tozuka (LDP)	Shinji Aoki (Social Democratic)
Buichi Katsumata (Social Democratic)	Hiroshi Kumagai (LDP)	1980	Shinya Tozuka (LDP)	Shinji Aoki (Social Democratic)
Shizuma Kojima (LDP)	Yutaka Takeyama (LDP)	1983	Shinya Tozuka (LDP)	Shinji Aoki (Social Democratic)
Shizuma Kojima (LDP)	Yutaka Takeyama (LDP)	1983 by-election (Note: Held 18 December 1983)	Sakae Fujita (LDP)	Shinji Aoki (Social Democratic)
Shizuma Kojima (LDP)	Yutaka Takeyama (LDP)	1986	Kazuhito Kimiya (LDP)	Shinji Aoki (Social Democratic)
Kijun Sakurai (Social Democratic) (Note: Sakurai nominated to contest the election as a Social Democratic candidate. During the campaign he was involved in an incident that saw the party withdraw their support for him, plus he ceased his own campaign activities. Despite this, he was elected officially as an independent candidate. He rejoined the party after the election.)	Yutaka Takeyama (LDP)	1989	Kazuhito Kimiya (LDP)	Shinji Aoki (Social Democratic)
Kijun Sakurai (Social Democratic)	Yutaka Takeyama (LDP)	1992	Kazuhito Kimiya (LDP)	Shinji Aoki (Social Democratic)
Masataka Suzuki (New Frontier)	Yutaka Takeyama (LDP)	1995	Kazuhito Kimiya (LDP)	Shinji Aoki (Social Democratic)
Masataka Suzuki (New Frontier)	Yutaka Takeyama (LDP)	1998	Yoshihiko Yamashita (LDP)	Toru Unno (Ind.) (Note: Was endorsed by the Democratic Party in the election and joined the party the following year.)
Kazuya Shimba (DPJ)	Yutaka Takeyama (LDP)	2001	Yoshihiko Yamashita (LDP)	Toru Unno (Ind.)
Kazuya Shimba (DPJ)	Yutaka Takeyama (LDP)	2004	Yukiko Sakamoto (Note: Resigned 17 June 2009 to contest the Shizuoka gubernatorial election.) (LDP)	Yuji Fujimoto (DPJ)
Kazuya Shimba (DPJ)	Takao Makino (LDP)	2007	Yukiko Sakamoto (LDP)	Yuji Fujimoto (DPJ)
Kazuya Shimba (DPJ)	Takao Makino (LDP)	2009 by-election (Note: Held 25 October 2009)	Hirokazu Tsuchida (DPJ)	Yuji Fujimoto (DPJ)
Kazuya Shimba (DPJ)	Takao Makino (LDP)	2010	Shigeki Iwai (LDP)	Yuji Fujimoto (DPJ)
Kazuya Shimba (DPJ)	Takao Makino (LDP)	2013	Shigeki Iwai (LDP)	Yuji Fujimoto (DPJ)

== Election results ==
2016
Party	Candidate	Votes	%	±%
LDP	Shigeki Iwai (Incumbent) (Endorsed by Komeito)	747,410	44.3	
Democratic	Sachiko Hirayama (Endorsed by Social Democratic Party)	691,687	41.0	
JCP	Chika Suzuki	172,382	10.2	
Independent	Sotaro Otake	54,412	3.2	
Happiness Realization	Toshimitsu Egashira	23,021	1.4	
Turnout		1,688,912	55.76	

2013
Party	Candidate	Votes	%	±%
LDP	Takao Makino (Incumbent) (Endorsed by Komeito)	634,789	41.5	
Democratic	Kazuya Shimba (Incumbent)	458,095	30.0	
Your	Yukiko Suzuki	187,055	12.2	
Restoration	Hiryu Mochizuki	119,109	7.8	
JCP	Daisuke Mori	115,411	7.6	
Happiness Realization	Yuta Nakano	13,692	0.9	
Turnout				

2010
Party	Candidate	Votes	%	±%
LDP	Shigeki Iwai	554,459	32.3	
Democratic	Yuji Fujimoto (Incumbent) (Endorsed by People's New Party)	485,507	28.2	
Your	Junichi Kawai	359,983	20.9	
Democratic	Naoko Nakamoto (Endorsed by People's New Party)	206,870	12.0	
JCP	Hiromi Watanabe	94,416	5.5	
Happiness Realization	Yuta Nakano	17,633	1.0	
Turnout				

2009 by-election
Party	Candidate	Votes	%	±%
Democratic	Hirokazu Tsuchida (Endorsed by People's New Party)	567,374	52.4	
LDP	Shigeki Iwai	404,763	37.4	
JCP	Takashige Hiraga	97,631	9.0	
Happiness Realization	Hissho Yanai	12,106	1.1	
Turnout		1,097,330	35.64	−22.77

2007
Party	Candidate	Votes	%	±%
Democratic	Kazuya Shimba (Incumbent)	823,184	47.1	
LDP	Takao Makino (Endorsed by Komeito)	549,375	31.4	
Independent	Ichi Kibe	150,306	8.6	
JCP	Takashige Hiraga	137,627	7.9	
Independent	Hirokazu Tsuchida	86,354	4.9	
Turnout			58.41	

2004
Party	Candidate	Votes	%	±%
LDP	Yukiko Sakamoto (endorsed by Komeito)	501,618	29.3	
Democratic	Yuji Fujimoto	369,573	21.6	
Democratic	Toru Unno (Incumbent)	361,938	21.2	
LDP	Yoshihiko Yamashita (Incumbent) (endorsed by Komeito)	343,368	20.1	
JCP	Yukihiro Shimazu	132,972	7.8	
Turnout				

== See also ==
- List of districts of the House of Councillors of Japan
