= Yamaguchi 2nd district =

Legislative district of Japan

Yamaguchi 2nd District
- Parliamentary constituency for the Japanese House of Representatives
- Numbered map of Yamaguchi Prefecture single-member districts
- Prefecture: Yamaguchi
- Proportional District: Chūgoku
- Electorate: 382,034 (2023)
- Major settlements: Kudamatsu, Iwakuni, Hikari, Yanai and Shūnan

Current constituency
- Created: 1994
- Party: LDP
- Representative: Nobuchiyo Kishi

Yamaguchi 2nd district (山口県第2区 Yamaguchi-ken dai-ni-ku) is a single-member electoral district for the House of Representatives, the lower house of the National Diet of Japan. It is located in Eastern Yamaguchi and consists of the cities of Kudamatsu, Iwakuni, Hikari, Yanai, and Shūnan as well as the districts of Kuga, Kumage and Ōshima.

While Yamaguchi is generally a stronghold for the Liberal Democratic Party, the 2nd district has historically been regarded as a swing seat with closer margins of victory.

== List of representatives ==
Representative	Party	Dates	Notes
Shinji Satō	LDP	1996 – 2000	
Hideo Hiraoka	DPJ	2000 – 2005	
Yoshihiko Fukuda	LDP	2005 – 2008	
Hideo Hiraoka	DPJ	2008 – 2012	
Nobuo Kishi	LDP	2012 – 2023	Resigned
Vacant (February 2023 – April 2023)
Nobuchiyo Kishi	LDP	2023 –	

== Recent election results ==
2026
Party	Candidate	Votes	%	±%
LDP	Nobuchiyo Kishi (incumbent)	132,409	62.1	▲11.69
Centrist Reform	Hideo Hiraoka	80,741	37.9	▼11.69
Majority		51,668	24.2	▲23.38
Registered electors		369,196		
Turnout		213,150	59.10	▲2.45
LDP hold				

2024
Party	Candidate	Votes	%	±%
LDP	Nobuchiyo Kishi (incumbent)	104,885	50.41	
CDP	Hideo Hiraoka (won PR seat)	103,161	49.59	
Majority		1,724	0.82	
Registered electors		375,543		
Turnout			56.65	▲5.04
LDP hold				

2023 Yamaguchi 2nd district by-election
Party	Candidate	Votes	%	±%
LDP	Nobuchiyo Kishi	61,369	52.5	▼24.4
Independent	Hideo Hiraoka	55,601	47.5	
Turnout			42.41	▼9.20
LDP hold				

2021
Party	Candidate	Votes	%	±%
LDP	Nobuo Kishi	109,914	76.9	▲3.1
JCP	Kazushi Matsuda	32,936	23.1	▼3.1
Turnout			51.61	▼2.27
LDP hold				

2017
Party	Candidate	Votes	%	±%
LDP - Kōmeitō	Nobuo Kishi	113,012	73.8	
JCP	Kazushi Matsuda	40,051	26.2	
Turnout		153,063	53.88	
