= Shigeki Iwai =

Japanese politician

- 岩井 茂樹
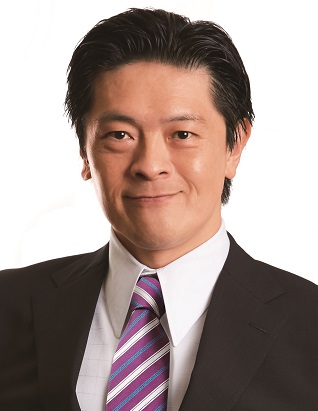
- Official portrait, 2015

Mayor of Higashiizu
- Incumbent
- Assumed office 26 March 2022
- Preceded by: Chōhachi Ōta

Member of the House of Councillors
- In office 26 July 2010 – 14 May 2021
- Preceded by: Hirokazu Tsuchida
- Succeeded by: Yamazaki Shinnosuke
- Constituency: Shizuoka at-large

Personal details
- Born: 2 June 1968 (age 58) Nagoya, Aichi, Japan
- Party: Liberal Democratic
- Parent: Kuniomi Iwai (father)
- Education: Nagoya University

Shigeki Iwai (岩井 茂樹, Iwai Shigeki, born 2 June 1968) is a Japanese politician who has served as mayor of Higashiizu in Shizuoka Prefecture since 2022.

He previously served as a member of the House of Councillors from 2010 to 2021, representing the Shizuoka at-large district as a member of the Liberal Democratic Party.

== Early life ==
Shigeki Iwai was born on 2 June 1968 in Aichi Prefecture. His father Kuniomi Iwai was a senior official in the Ministry of Construction and a member of the House of Councillors from 1995 to 2007. Iwai graduated from graduate school at Nagoya University and began working at the Maeda Corporation in 1996. He left to work as secretary to his father in 2004.

== Political career ==
Iwai was first elected to the House of Councillors in 2010. He served as Parliamentary Vice-Minister of Economy, Trade and Industry from 2014 to 2015. In 2020, he was appointed Senior Vice Minister of Land, Infrastructure, Transport and Tourism under the Suga Cabinet. He resigned from this position and his diet seat to run for governor of Shizuoka Prefecture in the 2021 election with the LDP support, but was defeated by the incumbent Heita Kawakatsu.

In March 2022, Iwai was elected unopposed as mayor of Higashiizu, a town on the Izu Peninsula in Shizuoka Prefecture.
