= Kōchi at-large district =

Former Japan House of Councillors constituency

The Kochi at-large district (Japanese: 高知県選挙区, Hepburn: Kōchi-ken Senkyoku) was a constituency that represents Kōchi Prefecture in the House of Councillors in the Diet of Japan. Councillors are elected to the house by single non-transferable vote (SNTV) for six-year terms. Since the establishment of the current House of Councillors electoral system in 1947, the district has elected two Councillors, one each at elections held every three years. With its 618,834 registered voters (as of September 2015) it is the third-smallest electoral district for the house. To address the imbalance in representation between districts, a 2015 revision of the Public Officers Election Law will see the district merged with the Tokushima At-large district to create the Tokushima-Kochi At-large district; this change will begin to take effect at the 2016 election, at which one Councillor will be elected.

The Councillors currently representing Kochi are:

- Hajime Hirota (Democratic Party of Japan; term ends in 2016)
- Kojiro Takano (Liberal Democratic Party; term ends in 2019)

== Elected Councillors ==
Class of 1947	Election year	Class of 1950
(1947: 6-year term)	Election year	(1947: 3-year term)
Kameshichi Nishiyama (Liberal)	1947	Tazō Irimajiri (Democratic)
Kameshichi Nishiyama (Liberal)	1950	Tazō Irimajiri (Liberal)
Yutaka Terao (Liberal)	1953	Tazō Irimajiri (Liberal)
Yutaka Terao (Liberal)	1956	Akira Sakamoto (Social Democratic)
Yutaka Terao (LDP)	1959	Akira Sakamoto (Social Democratic)
Yutaka Terao (LDP)	1962	Shunji Shiomi (LDP)
Yutaka Terao (LDP)	1965	Shunji Shiomi (LDP)
Yutaka Terao (LDP)	1968	Shunji Shiomi (LDP)
Takao Hamada (LDP) (Note: Died in office on 23 March 1974)	1971	Shunji Shiomi (LDP)
Yu Hayashi (LDP)	1974 by-election	Shunji Shiomi (LDP)
Yu Hayashi (LDP)	1974	Shunji Shiomi (LDP)
Yu Hayashi (LDP)	1977	Shunji Shiomi (LDP)
Yu Hayashi (LDP)	1980	Kanzo Tanigawa (LDP)
Yu Hayashi (LDP)	1983	Kanzo Tanigawa (LDP)
Yu Hayashi (LDP)	1986	Kanzo Tanigawa (LDP)
Ruriko Nishioka (Social Democratic)	1989	Kanzo Tanigawa (LDP)
Ruriko Nishioka (Social Democratic)	1992	Sadao Hirano (Ind.)
Kohei Tamura (Ind.)	1995	Sadao Hirano (Ind.)
Kohei Tamura (Ind.)	1998	Hiroyuki Morishita (LDP)
Kohei Tamura (Ind.)	2001	Hiroyuki Morishita (LDP)
Kohei Tamura (Ind.)	2004	Hajime Hirota (Ind.) (Note: Joined the Democratic Party in 2009.)
Norio Takeuchi (DPJ)	2007	Hajime Hirota (Ind.)
Norio Takeuchi (DPJ)	2010	Hajime Hirota (DPJ)
Kojiro Takano (LDP)	2013	Hajime Hirota (DPJ)
Kojiro Takano (LDP)	2016	Seat abolished
Seat abolished	2019	Seat abolished

== Election results ==
2013
Party	Candidate	Votes	%	±%
LDP	Kojiro Takano (endorsed by Komeito)	159,709	52.9	
JCP	Yuriko Hamakawa	72,939	24.1	
Democratic	Norio Takeuchi	65,236	21.6	
Happiness Realization	Tsuyoshi Hashizume	4,268	1.4	
Turnout			49.89	

2010
Party	Candidate	Votes	%	±%
Democratic	Hajime Hirota (Endorsed by People's New Party)	137,306	37.5	
LDP	Kojiro Takano	123,898	33.8	
Independent	Kohei Tamura	56,977	15.6	
JCP	Naoaki Haruna	38,998	10.7	
Independent	Toshihisa Fujishima	8,899	2.4	
Turnout			58.49	

2007
Party	Candidate	Votes	%	±%
Democratic	Norio Takeuchi	166,220	44.7	
LDP	Kohei Tamura (endorsed by Komeito)	154,104	41.4	
JCP	Nobuo Murakami	51,629	13.9	
Turnout				

2004
Party	Candidate	Votes	%	±%
Independent	Hajime Hirota (Endorsed by DPJ)	159,178	43.6	
LDP	Hiroyuki Morishita (Endorsed by Komeito)	130,544	35.7	
JCP	Sachi Nakane	52,169	14.3	
Independent	Yumiko Matsuoka (Endorsed by SDP)	23,441	6.4	
Turnout				
