= Takao Makino =

Japanese politician

- 牧野 京夫
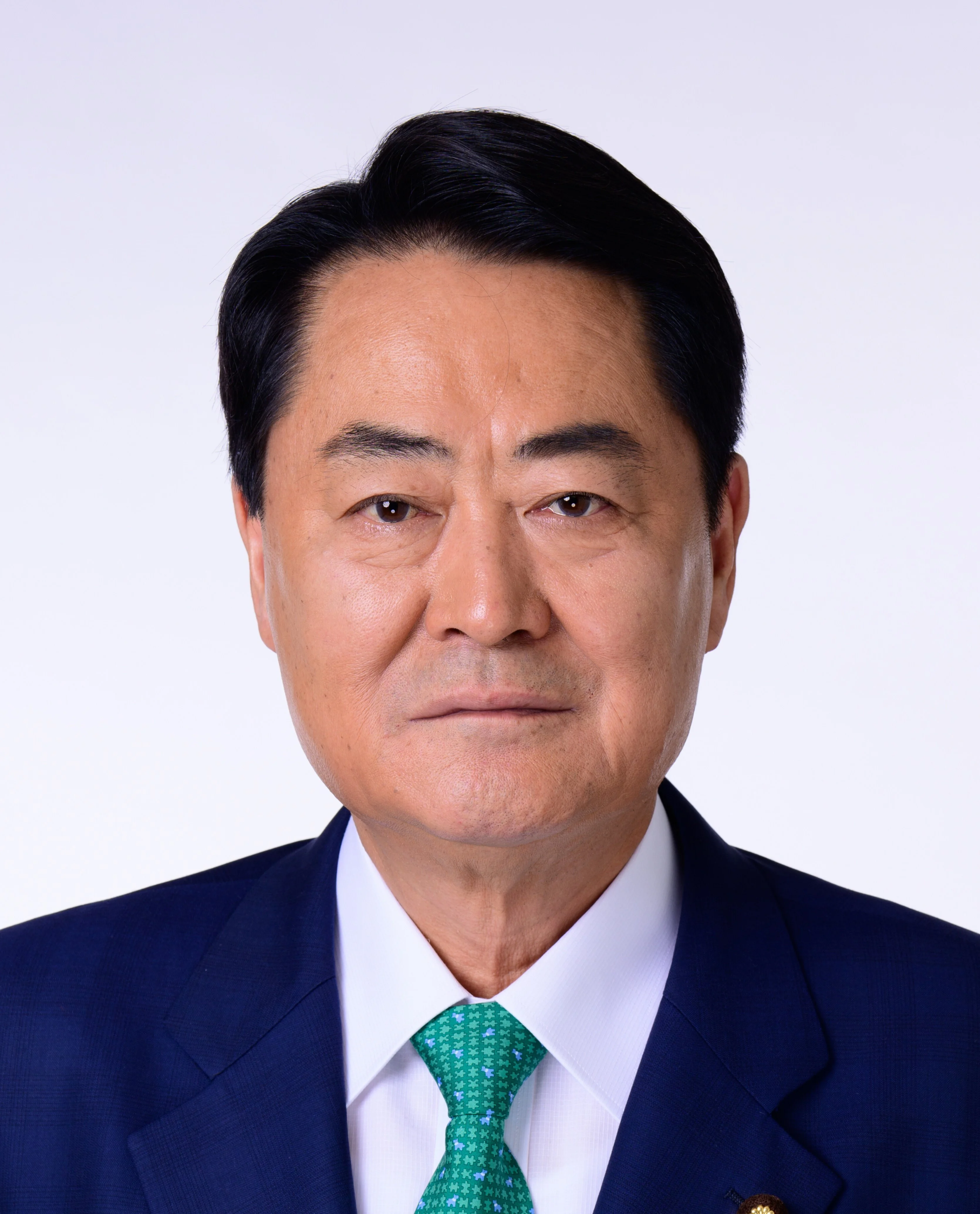
- Official portrait, 2025

Minister for Reconstruction
- In office 21 October 2025 – 17 September 2026
- Prime Minister: Sanae Takaichi
- Preceded by: Tadahiko Ito
- Succeeded by: Goshi Hosono

Member of the House of Councillors
- Incumbent
- Assumed office 29 July 2007
- Preceded by: Yutaka Takeyama
- Constituency: Shizuoka at-large

Member of the Shizuoka Prefectural Assembly
- In office 1999–2007
- Constituency: Haibara District

Personal details
- Born: 1 January 1959 (age 67) Kanaya, Shizuoka, Japan
- Party: Liberal Democratic
- Education: Waseda University

Takao Makino (牧野 京夫, Makino Takao; born 1959) is a Japanese politician of the Liberal Democratic Party who serves as member of the House of Councillors. A graduate of Waseda University and former member of the assembly of Shizuoka Prefecture, he was elected to the House of Councillors for the first time in 2007.
