= Mitsu Kōro =

Japanese politician

- 紅露 みつ

Member of the House of Councillors
- In office 15 August 1947 – 7 July 1968
- Preceded by: Makio Kishino
- Succeeded by: Kentarō Kujime
- Constituency: Tokushima at-large

Member of the House of Representatives
- In office 10 April 1946 – 31 March 1947
- Preceded by: Constituency established
- Succeeded by: Multi-member district
- Constituency: Tokushima at-large

Personal details
- Born: 10 May 1893 Matsuida, Gunma, Japan
- Died: 20 December 1980 (aged 87)
- Party: Liberal Democratic
- Other political affiliations: Independent (1946–1947); DP (1947–1950); NDP (1950–1952); Kaishintō (1952–1954); JDP (1954–1955)

Mitsu Kōro (Japanese: 紅露みつ; 10 May 1893 – 28 December 1980) was a Japanese politician. She was one of the first group of women elected to the House of Representatives in 1946. Aside from a brief spell in 1947, she served continuously in parliament until 1968.

== Biography ==
Kōro was born in Sakamoto in Gunma Prefecture in 1893. She attended Kanda Girl's High School in Tokyo, after which she married Akira Kōro, who was elected to parliament in 1932. She worked as a journalist. Their son Shinichi was stationed in Hiroshima towards the end of World War II and was killed by the atomic bomb dropped on the city.

After World War II, Akira was banned from holding public office. Instead, Kōro contested the 1946 general elections as an independent candidate in Tokushima, and was elected to the House of Representatives. She subsequently joined the Liberal Party. Although she lost her seat in the April 1947 general election, she returned to parliament after winning a seat in the August 1947 House of Councillors by-elections.

Kōro was subsequently re-elected in 1950 as a National Democratic Party candidate, and in 1956 and 1962 as a Liberal Democratic Party candidate, serving until 1968. She also served as Deputy Secretary of State for Health and Welfare in the second Ichiro Hatoyama cabinet in 1955. In 1965 she was awarded the Order of the Precious Crown.

She died in 1980.
