= Masakatsu Koike =

Japanese politician (born 1952)

- 小池 正勝
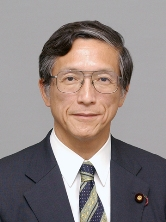
- Official portrait, 2007

Member of the House of Councillors
- In office 26 July 2004 – 25 July 2010
- Preceded by: Kiseko Takahashi
- Succeeded by: Yūsuke Nakanishi
- Constituency: Tokushima at-large

Mayor of Tokushima
- In office 4 March 1993 – 5 March 2004
- Preceded by: Toshiji Miki
- Succeeded by: Hideki Hara

Personal details
- Born: 17 January 1952 (age 74) Itabashi, Tokyo, Japan
- Party: Liberal Democratic (2004–2010)
- Other political affiliations: Independent (1993–2004); New Renaissance (2010)
- Education: University of Tokyo

Masakatsu Koike (小池 正勝, Koike Masakatsu; born January 17, 1952 in Itabashi, Tokyo) is a former Japanese politician. He served as a member of the House of Councillors representing the Tokushima at-large district as a member of the Liberal Democratic Party.

== Political career ==
1975	Graduated from the University of Tokyo. Entered the Ministry of Construction.
1993	Became the Mayor of Tokushima, Tokushima.
2004	Became a member of the Diet.

== See also ==
- Referendum
- Yoshino River

House of Councillors
Preceded by Kiseko Takahashi	Councillor for Tokushima; 2004 – present	Incumbent
Political offices
Preceded by Toshiji Miki	Mayor of Tokushima, Tokushima; 1993 – 2004	Succeeded by Hideki Hara
Preceded by Osamu Uno; Yasuhide Nakayama; Yukiko Sakamoto	Parliamentary Secretary of Foreign Affairs; 2007–2008; Served alongside: Osamu Uno, Yasuhide Nakayama	Succeeded by Masahiko Shibayama; Yasutoshi Nishimura; Nobuhide Minorikawa
