= Fukui 1st district =

Legislative district of Japan

Fukui 1st District
- Parliamentary constituency for the Japanese House of Representatives
- Numbered map of Fukui single-member districts
- Prefecture: Fukui
- Proportional District: Hokuriku-Shin'etsu
- Electorate: 373,413(2022)Ministry of Inner Affairs and Communications

Current constituency
- Created: 1994
- Seats: One
- Party: LDP
- Representative: Tomomi Inada

Fukui 1st district (福井県第1区, Fukui-ken dai-ikku or 福井1区, Fukui ikku) is a constituency of the House of Representatives in the Diet of Japan (national legislature).

== Areas covered ==
=== Areas covered from 2013 ===
The districts after its revision of the Public Offices Election Act 2013 are as follows. As a result of the change in the redistricting 2013, areas that used to be Fukui 3rd district and Fukui 2nd district were included.

- Fukui
- Ōno
- Katsuyama
- Awara
- Sakai
- Yoshida district

=== Areas covered before 2013 ===
Before the electoral reform of 1994, the area had been part of Fukui at-large district where four representatives had been elected. From the area's establishment in 1994 until its redistricting in 2013, the areas covered by the district were as follows:

- Fukui
- Asuwa District
- Yoshida District

== List of representatives ==
Representative	Party	Dates	Notes
Ryuzo Sasaki	NFP	1996–1997	
Ryuzo Sasaki	Independent	1997-2000	
Isao Matsumiya	LDP	2000–2005	
Isao Matsumiya	Independent	2005	
Tomomi Inada	LDP	2005–present	

== Election results ==
‡ - Also ran in the Hokuriku-Shin'etsu PR district election

‡‡ -Also ran and won in the Hokuriku-Shin'etsu PR district election

2026
Party	Candidate	Votes	%	±%
LDP	Tomomi Inada (incumbent)	93,292	48.1	▲4.21
Centrist Reform	Tsubasa Hatano‡	38,929	20.1	▼15.45
DPP	Shunsuke Yamanaka‡	34,541	17.8	New
Sanseitō	Kazuki Fujimoto‡	27,189	14.0	▲4.06
Registered electors		361,873		
Turnout		193,951	54.28	▼1.33
LDP hold				

2024
Party	Candidate	Votes	%	±%
LDP	Tomomi Inada (incumbent)	86,906	43.89	▼21.57
CDP	Tsubasa Hatano‡‡	70,328	35.52	▲0.98
Sanseitō	Koharu Tanaka	19,716	9.96	New
JCP	Yukie Kanemoto	11,215	5.66	New
Independent	Rie Nishiyama	9,845	4.97	New
Turnout		198,010	55.61	▼1.21

2021
Party	Candidate	Votes	%	±%
LDP	Tomomi Inada‡ (incumbent) (endorsed by Komeito)	136,171	65.46	▲8.12
CDP	Tomihisa Noda‡	71,845	34.54	New
Registered electors		375,210		
Turnout			56.82	▲2.03
LDP hold				

2017
Party	Candidate	Votes	%	±%
LDP	Tomomi Inada‡ (incumbent) (endorsed by Komeito)	116,969	57.34	▼7.50
Kibō no Tō	Kōji Suzuki‡	64,086	31.42	New
JCP	Yukie Kanemoto	22,931	11.24	▲2.61
Registered electors		383,767		
Turnout			54.79	▲6.15
LDP hold				

2014
Party	Candidate	Votes	%	±%
LDP	Tomomi Inada‡ (incumbent) (endorsed by Komeito)	116,855	64.84	▲12.24
Ishin	Kōji Suzuki‡	47,802	26.52	New
JCP	Yukie Kanemoto	15,561	8.63	▲3.98
Registered electors		378,855		
Turnout			48.64	
LDP hold				

2012
Party	Candidate	Votes	%	±%
LDP	Tomomi Inada‡ (incumbent) (endorsed by Komeito)	68,027	52.60	▲2.63
Restoration	Kōji Suzuki‡	29,622	22.90	New
Democratic	Ryuzo Sasaki‡ (incumbent - Hokuriku-Shin'etsu PR)	22,985	17.77	▼27.87
JCP	Yukie Kanemoto‡	6,014	4.65	▲0.26
Social Democratic	Takatoshi Yamazaki‡	2,681	2.07	New
Registered electors				
Turnout				
LDP hold				

2009
Party	Candidate	Votes	%	±%
LDP	Tomomi Inada‡ (incumbent)	78,969	49.97	▲16.57
Democratic	Ryuzo Sasaki‡‡ (incumbent - Hokuriku-Shin'etsu PR)	72,119	45.64	▲12.49
JCP	Yukie Kanemoto	6,940	4.39	▲0.49
Registered electors				
Turnout				
LDP hold				

2005
Party	Candidate	Votes	%	±%
LDP	Tomomi Inada‡	51,242	33.40	▼8.67
Democratic	Ryuzo Sasaki‡‡	50,869	33.15	▲20.83
Independent	Isao Matsumiya (incumbent)	45,332	29.55	New
JCP	Yukie Kanemoto	5,988	3.90	▼0.90
Registered electors				
Turnout				
Swing to LDP from Independent		Swing		

2003
Party	Candidate	Votes	%	±%
LDP	Isao Matsumiya‡ (incumbent)	55,698	42.07	▼0.95
Independent	Ryuzo Sasaki	54,019	40.81	▲3.00
Democratic	Humitake Hongō‡	16,309	12.32	▲0.81
JCP	Yukie Kanemoto	5,988	4.80	▼2.87
Registered electors				
Turnout				
LDP hold				

2000
Party	Candidate	Votes	%	±%
LDP	Isao Matsumiya‡	61,707	43.02	▲20.25
Independent	Ryuzo Sasaki (incumbent)	54,234	37.81	New
Democratic	Yasushi Aoki‡	16,507	11.51	New
JCP	Yukie Kanemoto	10,998	7.67	▲1.76
Registered electors				
Turnout				
Swing to LDP from Independent		Swing		

1996
Party	Candidate	Votes	%	±%
New Frontier	Ryuzo Sasaki (incumbent)	48,214	34.02	New
Independent	Isao Matsumiya	40,840	28.82	New
LDP	Wataru Hiraizumi‡ (incumbent)	32,263	22.77	New
Democratic	Tasaburo Furukawa	12,022	8.48	New
JCP	Yukie Kanemoto	8,369	5.91	New
Registered electors				
Turnout				
New Frontier win (new seat)				
