= Yoshihiko Fukuda =

Japanese politician (born 1970)

- 福田 良彦
- Fukuda in 2018

Mayor of Iwakuni
- Incumbent
- Assumed office 10 February 2008
- Preceded by: Katsusuke Ihara

Member of the House of Representatives
- In office 11 September 2005 – 22 January 2008
- Preceded by: Hideo Hiraoka
- Succeeded by: Hideo Hiraoka
- Constituency: Yamaguchi 2nd

Member of the Yamaguchi Prefectural Assembly
- In office 2003–2005
- Constituency: Iwakuni City Kuga District

Member of the Iwakuni City Council
- In office 1999–2003

Personal details
- Born: 14 June 1970 (age 56)
- Party: Liberal Democratic
- Education: Hosei University

Yoshihiko Fukuda (福田 良彦, Fukuda Yoshihiko; born 14 June 1970) is a Japanese politician of the Liberal Democratic Party, who is a former member of the House of Representatives in the Diet. A native of Iwakuni in Yamaguchi Prefecture and graduate of Hosei University, he was elected to the city assembly of Iwakuni in 1999, to the Yamaguchi Prefectural Assembly in 2003, and to the House of Representatives in 2005. In 2008 he was elected the Mayor of Iwakuni.
