= Yamaguchi 4th district =

Japanese parliamentary constituency

Yamaguchi 4th District
- Former Parliamentary constituency for the Japanese House of Representatives
- Prefecture: Yamaguchi
- Proportional District: Chūgoku
- Electorate: 256,464 (2017)
- Major settlements: Shimonoseki and Nagato

Former constituency
- Created: 1994
- Abolished: 2022
- Seats: One

Yamaguchi 4th district (山口県第4区 Yamaguchi-ken dai-yon-ku) was a single-member electoral district for the House of Representatives, the lower house of the National Diet of Japan. It was located in Western Yamaguchi Prefecture and consisted of the cities of Shimonoseki and Nagato. The seat was held by former Prime Minister of Japan Shinzo Abe until his assassination in July 2022. As of September 2011, 266,456 voters were registered in the district, giving its voters well above average (347,878 voters per district) vote weight. Unlike many prefectures where the capital is also the most populous city, Yamaguchi's major city is Shimonoseki, located at the western tip of Honshū and adjacent to Kyushu island's Fukuoka-Kitakyūshū metropolitan area which lies just south across the Kanmon Straits.

Yamaguchi is home to the Kan Abe - Nobusuke Kishi-Shintarō Abe (non-prime minister, father of Shinzo Abe)-Eisaku Satō prime ministerial family whose members have represented the prefecture in the Diet for much of the postwar era and the Giichi Tanaka prime ministerial family that produced its first two elected governors. Western Yamaguchi formed the four-member 1st district until the electoral reform of the 1990s, its representatives included Shintarō Abe, Shinzō Abe (former Prime Minister of Japan) and Tatsuo Tanaka, but also other prominent conservatives such as finance minister Yoshirō Hayashi or Takeo Kawamura who went on to become Chief Cabinet Secretary in the 2000s.

The Liberal Democratic Party (LDP) usually won the district three seats to one. In the electoral reform, the 1st district was split up into the single-member 3rd and 4th districts. In the first post-reform election of 1996, the 4th district was contested by Shinzō Abe and Takaaki Koga, himself a former Liberal Democrat who in 1993 took the opposition seat in the 1st district from the Socialists for the Renewal Party. But Abe won, and easily held onto the seat from then on. He was elected LDP president and Prime Minister in 2006 against Tarō Asō and Sadakazu Tanigaki in succession to Junichiro Koizumi (Kanagawa 11th district), but resigned after one year.

In 2012, the party – in opposition since 2009 – once more elected Shinzo Abe as the third LDP president not to become prime minister immediately after his election. Abe then subsequently won the 2012 general election in a landslide victory against the DPJ of Yoshihiko Noda (Chiba 4th district), returning the LDP to power (with coalition partner New Komeito, the LDP have a two-thirds majority and can break a deadlock in the National Diet) and became prime minister again.

== List of representatives ==
Member	Party	Dates	Electoral history	Notes
Shinzo Abe	Liberal Democratic	20 October 1996 – 8 July 2022	Elected in 1996. Re-elected in 2000. Re-elected in 2003. Re-elected in 2005. Re-elected in 2009. Re-elected in 2012. Re-elected in 2014. Re-elected in 2017. Re-elected in 2021. Assassinated.	Deputy Chief Cabinet Secretary (2005–2006); Prime Minister of Japan (2006–2007; 2012–2020)
Vacant		8 July 2022 – 24 April 2023		
Shinji Yoshida	Liberal Democratic	25 April 2023 – 9 October 2024	Elected to finish Abe's term.	Constituency abolished

== Election results ==
2023
Party	Candidate	Votes	%	±%
LDP	Shinji Yoshida	51,961	63.5	▼6.2
CDP	Yoshifu Arita	25,595	31.3	
Independent	Yoriko Ohno	2,381	2.9	▼10.8
Seijika Joshi	Ai Watanabe	1,186	1.4	
Independent	Hideyuki Takemoto	734	0.9	
Turnout		81857	34.71	▼13.93
LDP hold				

2021
Party	Candidate	Votes	%	±%
LDP	Shinzō Abe	80,448	69.7	▼2.9
Reiwa	Katsushi Takemura	19,096	16.6	New
Independent	Yoriko Ohno	15,836	13.7	New
Margin of victory		61,352	53.17	▼5.23
Turnout		115,380	48.64	▼8.95
LDP hold		Swing	▼2.9	

2017
Party	Candidate	Votes	%	±%
LDP	Shinzō Abe	104,825	72.6	▼3.7
Kibo	Fujita Tokioo	18,567	12.9	New
JCP	Hiroaki Nishioka	13,721	9.5	▼3.6
Independent	Kurotawa Atsuhiko	6,687	4.6	New
Independent	Akihiro County	645	0.4	New
Margin of victory		86,258	58.40	▼4.74
Turnout		147,702	57.59	▲5.03
LDP hold		Swing	▼3.7	

2014
Party	Candidate	Votes	%	±%
LDP	Shinzō Abe	100,829	76.3	▼1.9
JCP	Sadayoshi Yoshida	17,358	13.1	▲4.0
Independent - PLP	Toshie Watanabe	14,018	10.6	New
Margin of victory		83,471	63.14	▼2.29
Turnout		132,205	52.56	▼6.89
LDP hold		Swing	▼1.9	

2012
Party	Candidate	Votes	%	±%
LDP	Shinzō Abe	118,696	78.2	▲13.9
DPJ	Shintarō Zaima	19,336	12.7	▼18.4
JCP	Norio Higaki	13,815	9.1	▲4.5
Margin of victory		99,360	65.43	▲31.7
Turnout		151,847	59.45	▼11.6
LDP hold		Swing	▲13.9	

2009
Party	Candidate	Votes	%	±%
LDP	Shinzō Abe	121,365	64.3	▼9.3
DPJ – PNP	Takako Tokura	58,795	31.1	▲11.4
JCP	Daisuke Kisaki	8,725	4.6	▼2.1
Margin of victory		62,570	32.73	▼20.34
Turnout		191,199	71.05	▲2.11
LDP hold		Swing	▼9.3	

2005
Party	Candidate	Votes	%	±%
LDP	Shinzō Abe	137,701	73.6	▼6.1
DPJ	Takashi Katō	36,847	19.7	▲19.9
JCP	Daisuke Kisaki	12,499	6.7	▼1.5
Margin of victory		100,854	53.07	▼13.11
Turnout		190,032	68.94	▲3.93
LDP hold		Swing	▼6.1	

2003
Party	Candidate	Votes	%	±%
LDP	Shinzō Abe	140,347	79.7	▲8.0
SDP	Jun'ichirō Kojima	21,202	12.0	▲12.0
JCP	Hiroshi Ikenoue	14,438	8.2	▼20.1
Margin of victory		119,145	66.18	▲22.76
Turnout		180,044	65.01	▼0.03
LDP hold		Swing	▲8.0	

2000
Party	Candidate	Votes	%	±%
LDP	Shinzō Abe	121,835	71.7	▲17.4
JCP	Hiroshi Ikenoue	48,068	28.3	▲17.3
Margin of victory		73,767	43.42	▲24.23
Turnout		169,903	65.04	▲1.72
LDP hold		Swing	▲17.4	

1996
Party	Candidate	Votes	%	±%
LDP	Shinzō Abe	93,459	54.3	New
NFP	Takaaki Koga	59,676	34.7	New
JCP	Hiroshi Ikenoue	18,853	11.0	New
Margin of victory		33,783	19.19	−
Turnout		176,042	63.32	−

House of Representatives (Japan)
Preceded by Kanagawa 11th district	Constituency represented by the prime minister 2006–2007	Succeeded by Gunma 4th district
Preceded by Chiba 4th district	Constituency represented by the prime minister 2012 – 2020	Succeeded by Kanagawa 2nd district
