= Tokushima at-large district =

Former Japan House of Councillors constituency

Tokushima at-large district (徳島県選挙区, Tokushima-ken senkyoku) was a constituency of the House of Councillors in the Diet of Japan (national legislature). It consists of Tokushima Prefecture and elects two Councillors, one every three years by a first-past-the-post system for a six-year term. In the first election in 1947, Tokushima like all districts used single non-transferable vote to elect both its Councillors in one election.

Single-member districts (ichinin-ku) for the House of Councillors often play a decisive role for the outcome of elections as little swing in votes is required to achieve a change of the Councillors elected there. Tokushima in predominantly rural Shikoku has for decades voted for candidates from the Liberal Democratic Party (LDP) or ex-LDP conservative independents by large margins. In the landslide election of 1989 that left the LDP-led government without a majority in the House of Councillors for the first time, a so-called "twisted parliament" (nejire kokkai), Harumi Inui from RENGO trade union federation's Rengō no Kai won Tokushima against incumbent Tomoyoshi Kamanaga by a margin of 60,000 votes.

With its 641,534 registered voters (as of September 2015), it is the fourth-smallest electoral district for the house. To address the imbalance in representation between districts, a 2015 revision of the Public Officers Election Law will see the district merged with the Kochi At-large district to create the Tokushima-Kochi At-large district; this change will begin to take effect at the 2016 election, at which one Councillor will be elected.

The current Councillors for Tokushima are:

- Yusuke Nakanishi (LDP, term expires 2016)
- Toru Miki (LDP, term expires 2019)

== Elected Councillors ==
Class of 1947	Election year	Class of 1950
#1 (1947: #1, 6-year term)	Election year	#1 (1947: #2, 3-year term)
Yojin Akazawa (Kakushin Kyōdō, "Progressive Cooperation")	1947	Makio Kishino (Indep.)
Yojin Akazawa (Kakushin Kyōdō, "Progressive Cooperation")	1947 by-el.	Mitsu Kōro (DP)
Yojin Akazawa (Kakushin Kyōdō, "Progressive Cooperation")	1950	Mitsu Kōro (NDP)
Yokichirō Miki (Indep.)	1953	Mitsu Kōro (NDP)
Yokichirō Miki (Indep.)	1956	Mitsu Kōro (LDP)
Yokichirō Miki (LDP)	1959	Mitsu Kōro (LDP)
Yokichirō Miki (LDP)	1962	Mitsu Kōro (LDP)
Yokichirō Miki (LDP)	1965	Mitsu Kōro (LDP)
Yokichirō Miki (LDP)	1968	Kentarō Kujime (LDP)
Kōshō Ogasa (Indep.)	1971	Kentarō Kujime (LDP)
Kōshō Ogasa (Indep.)	1974	Kentarō Kujime (Indep.)
Tomoyoshi Kamenaga (LDP)	1977	Kentarō Kujime (Indep.)
Tomoyoshi Kamenaga (LDP)	1980	Ken Naitō (LDP)
Tomoyoshi Kamenaga (LDP)	1983	Ken Naitō (LDP)
Tomoyoshi Kamenaga (LDP)	1986	Kōji Matsuura (LDP)
Harumi Inui (Rengō no Kai)	1989	Kōji Matsuura (LDP)
Harumi Inui (Rengō no Kai)	1992	Kōji Matsuura (LDP)
Shūji Kitaoka (LDP)	1995	Kōji Matsuura (LDP)
Shūji Kitaoka (LDP)	1998	Kiseko Takahashi (Indep.)
Shūji Kitaoka (LDP)	2001	Kiseko Takahashi (Indep.)
Shūji Kitaoka (LDP)	2004	Masakatsu Koike (LDP)
Tomoji Nakatani (DPJ)	2007	Masakatsu Koike (LDP)
Tomoji Nakatani (DPJ)	2010	Yūsuke Nakanishi (LDP)
Toru Miki (LDP)	2013	Yūsuke Nakanishi (LDP)
Toru Miki (LDP)	2016	seat to be abolished
seat to be abolished	2019	seat to be abolished
