= Tomoji Nakatani =

Japanese politician

- 中谷 智司
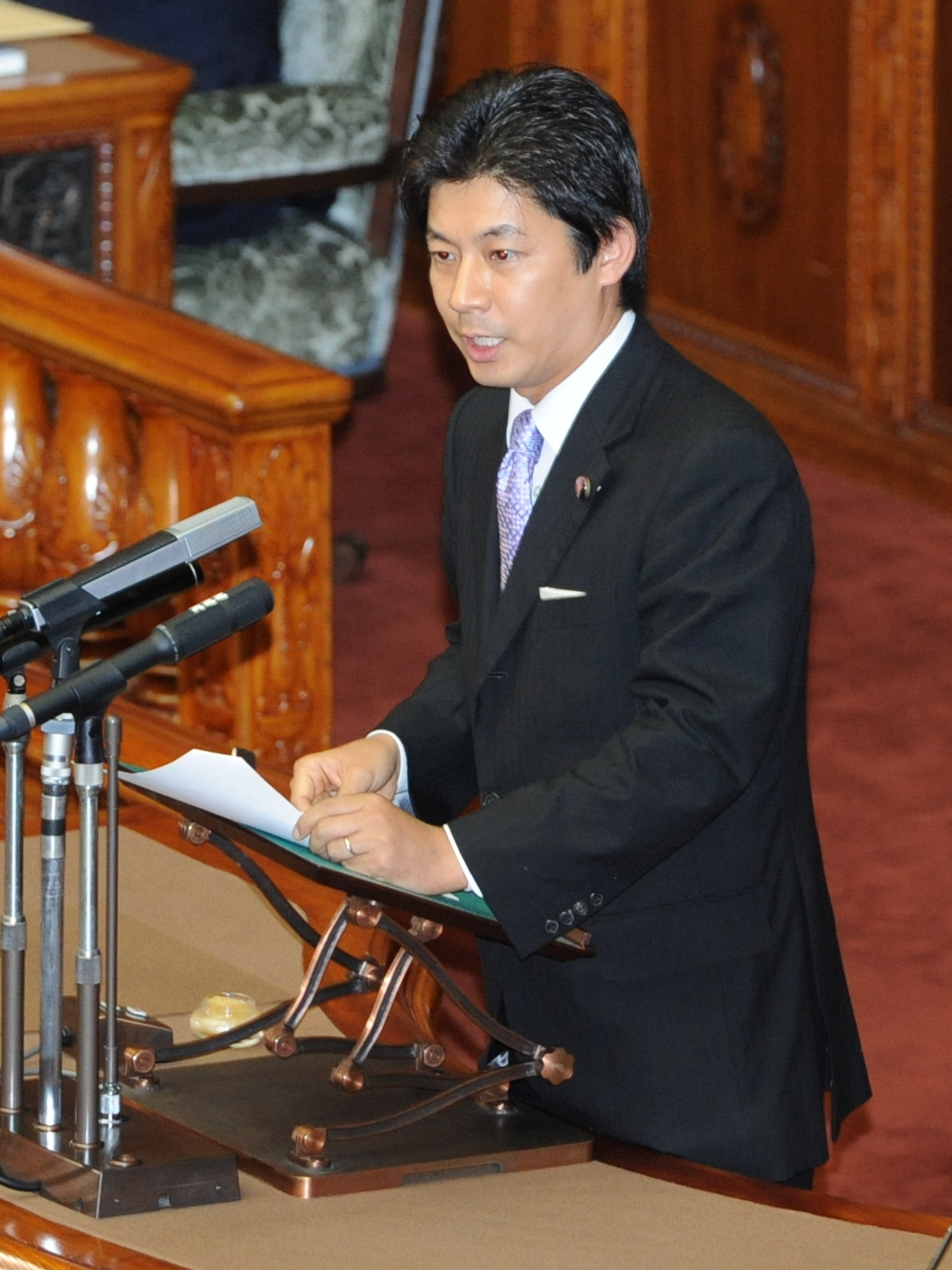
- Nakatani in 2010

Member of the House of Councillors
- In office 29 July 2007 – 28 July 2013
- Preceded by: Shūji Kitaoka
- Succeeded by: Tōru Miki
- Constituency: Tokushima at-large

Personal details
- Born: 22 November 1968 (age 57) Tokushima City, Tokushima, Japan
- Party: Democratic
- Education: University of Tokushima

Tomoji Nakatani (中谷 智司, Nakatani Tomoji; born November 22, 1968) is a former Japanese politician of the Democratic Party of Japan, who served as a member of the House of Councillors in the Diet (national legislature). A native of Tokushima, Tokushima, he graduated from University of Tokushima in 1992 and received a master's degree from it in 1994. He was elected to the House of Councillors for the first time in 2007.

House of Councillors
Preceded by Shūji Kitaoka	Councillor for Tokushima; 2007–present	Incumbent
