= Isao Matsumiya =

Japanese politician

- 松宮 勲
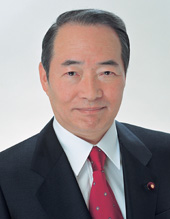
- Official portrait, 2012

Member of the House of Representatives
- In office 30 August 2009 – 16 November 2012
- Constituency: Hokuriku-Shin'etsu PR
- In office 25 June 2000 – 8 August 2005
- Preceded by: Ryuzo Sasaki
- Succeeded by: Tomomi Inada
- Constituency: Fukui 1st

Personal details
- Born: 28 May 1944 (age 82) Sabae, Fukui, Japan
- Party: Democratic (2007–2012)
- Other political affiliations: LDP (2000–2005); Independent (2005–2007)
- Education: University of Tokyo

Isao Matsumiya is a former Japanese politician. He attended the University of Tokyo. Matsumiya served as a member of the House of Representatives of Japan from 2000 to 2005 and again from 2009 to 2012. He was succeeded by Tomomi Inada for the 1st Fukui Prefecture office in 2005.
