= Yuji Fujimoto =

Japanese politician

- 藤本 祐司
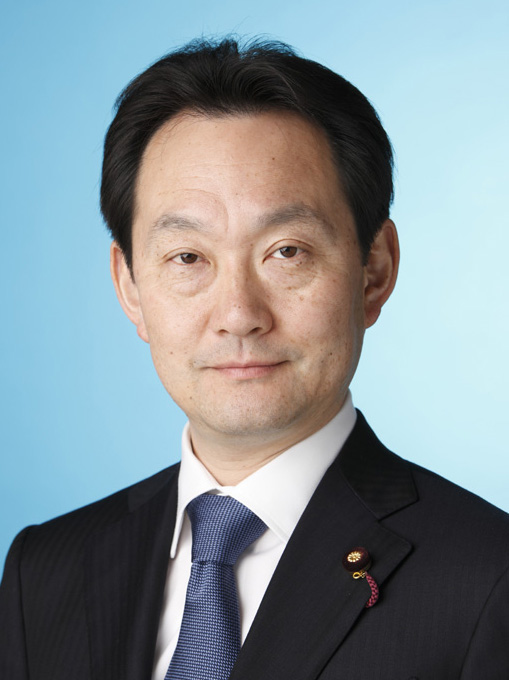
- Official portrait, 2009

Member of the House of Councillors
- In office 26 July 2004 – 25 July 2016
- Preceded by: Tōru Unno
- Succeeded by: Sachiko Hirayama
- Constituency: Shizuoka at-large

Personal details
- Born: 16 February 1957 (age 69) Hamamatsu, Shizuoka, Japan
- Party: DPJ (2004–2016)
- Other political affiliations: DP (2016)
- Education: Waseda University

Yuji Fujimoto (藤本 祐司, Fujimoto Yūji; born February 16, 1957) is a Japanese politician of the Democratic Party of Japan, a member of the House of Councillors in the Diet (national legislature). A native of Hamamatsu, Shizuoka, he graduated from Waseda University and received his master's degree from Michigan State University. In 2004, he was elected to the House of Councillors for the first time.
