= 2008 Democratic Party of Japan leadership election =

Political party election in Japan

- 21 September 2008
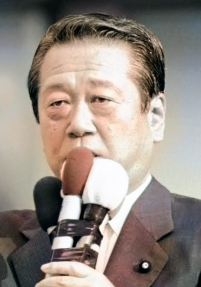
Candidate	Ichirō Ozawa
Leader's seat	Iwate 4th
Result	Unopposed
President before election
Ichirō Ozawa
Elected President
Ichirō Ozawa

The 2008 Democratic Party of Japan presidential election was held on 21 September 2008 in accordance with the end of the presidential term which had commenced in 2006. Incumbent president Ichirō Ozawa was re-elected unopposed.

== Background ==
Ozawa had been elected to a full two-year term in September 2006, and during that time led the party to victory in the 2007 upper house elections, dealing a serious blow to the Liberal Democratic government. By September 2008, the DPJ was leading the polls against the ailing government and had seen off Prime Ministers Shinzo Abe and Yasuo Fukuda, who each lasted just a year in office. Ozawa had successfully maintained unity in his leadership troika with Naoto Kan and Yukio Hatoyama, and was widely expected to be re-elected.

== Electoral system ==
Candidates were required to gather endorsements from twenty (maximum 25) of the party's members of the National Diet in order to stand.

If it was contested, the election was to be conducted via a points system:

- Each of the party's members of the National Diet had a vote worth two points. (450 points total)
- Registered party members or supporters could vote via mail. Each House of Representative constituency had one point, awarded to the most voted candidate in that constituency. (300 points total)
- Each of the party's members of local councils or prefectural assemblies could vote via mail. Points for this tier were awarded to candidates in proportion to votes won. (100 points total)
- Each of the party's approved candidates for future Diet elections had a vote worth one point. (134 points total)

In order to win, a candidate must secure more than 50% of points. If no candidate won more than 50%, a runoff was to be held the same day. In the runoff, only Diet members and approved candidates could vote.

Nominations were taken on the 12th and the election held the same day. Ozawa was the only candidate to nominate and was therefore confirmed without a ballot.

== Candidates ==
Candidate	Offices held
Ichirō Ozawa (age 66); Iwate Prefecture	Member of the House of Representatives (1969–); President of the Democratic Party of Japan (2006–)

== Contest ==
Discussion of whether the ballot should be contested was more serious than in September 2006. While Kan and Hatoyama once again endorsed Ozawa, Seiji Maehara repeatedly called for an open contest to spur policy debate, though declined to run himself. Maehara criticised Ozawa's policies as vague, including his security and taxation plans, and suggested that debate would clarify the party's position ahead of the next election. Yoshihiko Noda and Yukio Edano were rumoured to be considering standing, but ultimately declined as well. A secretary from Takashi Kawamura's office represented him at an information session for prospective candidates held on 1 September, but he ultimately did not run either.

Ozawa announced he would seek re-election on 2 September and was the only candidate to stand when nominations were taken on 8 September. He was confirmed without a vote at the party convention on 21 September. He called for the ruling LDP to hold snap elections to the House of Representatives ahead of that party's own leadership contest, which concluded the following day.
