= Tokushima-Kōchi at-large district =

Japanese House of Councillors constituency

Tokushima-Kōchi at-large district at-large district
- 徳島県・高知県選挙区
- Parliamentary constituency for the House of Councillors
- Prefecture: Tokushima, Kōchi
- Electorate: 1,196,984 (as of September 2022)

Current constituency
- Created: 2015
- Seats: 2
- Councillors: Class of 2019: Hajime Hirota (Note: Hirota was elected in a by-election in 2023, following Kojiro Takano confessing to assaulting his secretary.) (Ind.) (Note: Hirota is caucusing with the CDP and SDP as an independent Councilor.); Class of 2022: Yūsuke Nakanishi (LDP)

The Tokushima-Kochi at-large district (徳島県・高知県選挙区, Tokushima-ken-Kōchi-ken senkyoku) is a constituency of the House of Councillors in the Diet of Japan (national legislature). The district was formed in 2015 from a merger of the Tokushima and Kōchi at-large districts. Liberal Democratic Party member Yusuke Nakanishi was elected as its first representative at the House of Councillors election in July 2016.

== District outline ==
The district was formed pursuant to a 2015 revision of the Public Officers Election Law from a merger of the Tokushima and Kōchi at-large districts to address the imbalance in representation between rural and urban districts. At the same time, the Tottori and Shimane at-large districts were merged to form the Tottori-Shimane at-large district and changes in the number of Councillors representing eight other prefectures were also made to address the imbalance.

The district represents Kochi and Tokushima Prefectures and had 1,261,100 registered voters at the most recent annual survey in September 2015. The district will elect two Councillors to six-year terms, one every three years by a first-past-the-post system. The first Councillor to represent the district, Yusuke Nakanishi of the Liberal Democratic Party, was elected in the House of Councillors election held on 10 July 2016. At the time of the election the number of registered voters had increased to 1,284,099.

The merger has proved very unpopular within both prefectures. A June 2016 survey, conducted two weeks prior to the first election in the new district, found that three quarters of respondents in each prefecture opposed the merger. Kochi residents had a further issue of complaint, as all candidates in the election were born in Tokushima, leaving Kochi residents feeling as if they do not have a voice in the election.

== 2016 election ==
=== Candidates ===
In the first election held for the combined district, the incumbent member for the Tokushima district, Yusuke Nakanishi, was selected as the ruling Liberal Democratic Party's candidate. Hajime Hirota, the Democratic Party's incumbent member in the Kochi district, announced on 31 October 2015 that he would not contest the district as a protest against the merger. In June 2016 it was reported that Hirota would instead contest one of Kochi Prefecture's districts at the next House of Representatives election, to be held by the end of 2018. During the nomination period, the opposition Democratic, Communist, Social Democratic and People's Life parties formed an agreement to field a joint candidate in single-member districts such as Tokushima-Kochi. Sō Ōnishi, a director of the Japan Federation of Bar Associations and president of the Tokushima Bar Association, contested the election as an independent candidate with official endorsements from the Democratic, Communist and Social Democratic parties. The third candidate was Masatoshi Fukuyama of the Happiness Realization Party.

Candidates
Independent	Sō Ōnishi	Endorsed by Democratic, Communist and Social Democratic parties
Happiness Realization	Masatoshi Fukuyama	
Liberal Democratic	Yusuke Nakanishi (Incumbent)	

=== Results ===
Nakanishi retained his seat in the Diet, receiving 54.1% of the vote compared to Ōnishi's 42.9%. Nakanishi claimed 57.9% of votes cast within Tokushima, but the difference between the two main candidates within Kochi Prefecture was much closer, with Nakanishi and Ōnishi receiving 49.8% and 47.2% respectively.

2016
Party	Candidate	Votes	%	±%
LDP	Yusuke Nakanishi (Incumbent)	305,688	54.1	N/A
Independent	Sō Ōnishi	242,781	42.9	N/A
Happiness Realization	Masatoshi Fukuyama	16,988	3.0	N/A
Total valid votes		565,457	95.50	N/A
Informal votes		26,635	4.50	N/A
Turnout		592,092	46.26	N/A

=== Turnout ===
The overall voter turnout in the district was 46.26%, the lowest in the nation, and both prefectures recorded their lowest turnout to a House of Councillors election. By comparison, nationwide the turnout was 54.7%, a 2.1% increase from 2013. Of the 592,092 voters to cast a vote in the district, 157,550 (26.6%) attended pre-polling booths in the two-week period before the July 10 election date.

In Tokushima, the turnout was 46.98%, a 2.31% decrease from the previous election in July 2013. Amongst the eight cities of the prefecture, Tokushima city had the lowest turnout at 43.25%. Miyoshi recorded the highest turnout amongst the cities at 58.89%, but recorded a drop of more than 15% from its 2013 turnout. The city of Awa and town of Kamikatsu were the only municipalities within the entire electoral district to see an increase in turnout, with increases of 1.15% and 0.23% respectively.

In Kōchi, which was not the home prefecture of any of the candidates, the turnout was 45.52%, a 4.37% fall from the previous election. Turnout in Kōchi city and three other cities within the prefecture fell my more than 5%, and the village of Umaji saw a fall of almost 10%. Attendance at pre-polling booths saw an increase from 20.3% of participating voters in 2013 to 25.9% in 2016. On top of the poor turnout, 6.15% of those who turned out cast an invalid vote, compared to 3.55% in 2013, and nine voters left the polling booth without submitting their ballot.

Tokushima governor Kamon Iizumi said that the extremely poor turnout within the district was evidence of a problem and that the merger should be reversed, an issue that he would raise at the next meeting of the nation's governors. Iizumi also called upon Nakanishi to become a flag bearer for regional revitalization, as it was the decline in population throughout rural Japan which led to the merger of the smaller districts.

A revision to the electoral law came into effect three weeks before the election, which reduced the eligible age for voting from 20 to 18 years old. The number of people enrolled to vote in Tokushima-Kōchi on the day of the election was 1,279,900, an increase of 18,800 (1.5%) compared to the annual survey conducted ten months earlier.

=== National block vote ===
Voters in the election also cast a second ballot in the 48-member national proportional representation block. Voters have the option of voting for a specific candidate within a party, or for a party as a whole. Votes for specific candidates are used to determine who takes the seats won by the party. Tokushima's support for the conservative LDP and Komeito parties that make up the ruling coalition was 5.9% higher than the national average; conversely, Kochi's vote for the Communist Party was 6.7% higher than the national vote.

National block voting results within the Tokushima-Kōchi at-large district
Party	Tokushima Prefecture		Kochi Prefecture		District Total		National Total	
Party	Votes	%	Votes	%	Votes	%	%	Seats Won
Liberal Democratic	112,622.435	38.44	99,751.816	37.01	212,374.251	37.76	35.91	19
Democratic	51,915.242	17.72	45,676.135	16.95	97,591.377	17.35	20.98	11
Komeito	49,423.864	16.87	42,651.481	15.83	92,075.345	16.37	13.52	7
Japanese Communist Party	26,655.815	9.10	46,933.951	17.41	73,589.766	13.08	10.74	5
Initiatives from Osaka	27,705.285	9.46	10,589.460	3.93	38,294.745	6.81	9.20	4
Social Democratic Party	5,299.373	1.81	7,856.316	2.91	13,155.689	2.34	2.74	1
People's Life Party	4,794.000	1.64	4,123.000	1.53	8,917.000	1.56	1.91	1
Happiness Realization Party	3,722.000	1.27	2,109.000	0.78	5,831.000	1.04	0.65	0
Kokumin Ikari no Koe	3,047.511	1.04	2,669.051	0.99	5,716.562	1.02	0.83	0
No Party to Support	2,897.000	0.99	2,799.000	1.04	5,696.000	1.01	1.16	0
Party for Japanese Kokoro	3,034.698	1.04	2,414.356	0.90	5,449.054	0.97	1.31	0
New Renaissance Party	1,851.691	0.63	1,941.337	0.72	3,793.028	0.67	1.04	0
Total valid votes	292,973 (Note: Includes 0.086 votes discarded during distribution and 4 votes for persons or parties not on the list of candidates.)	95.74	269,522 (Note: Includes 0.097 votes discarded during distribution and 7 votes for persons or parties not on the list of candidates.)	94.23	562,495	95.01		
Invalid votes	13,018	4.26	16,495	5.77	29,523	4.99		
Turnout	306,001	46.96	286,024	45.52	592,025	46.26	52.61	–
