= Kentaro Sonoura =

Japanese politician (born 1972)

- 薗浦 健太郎
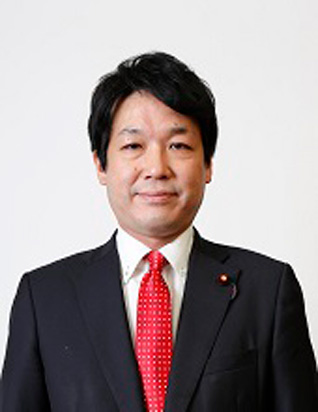
- Official portrait, 2018

Special Advisor to the Prime Minister in charge of important national security policies
- In office 3 August 2017 – 11 September 2019
- Prime Minister: Shinzo Abe
- Preceded by: Masahiko Shibayama
- Succeeded by: Minoru Kihara

Member of the House of Representatives
- In office 19 December 2012 – 21 December 2022
- Preceded by: Hirotami Murakoshi
- Succeeded by: Arfiya Eri
- Constituency: Chiba 5th
- In office 11 September 2005 – 21 July 2009
- Preceded by: Hirotami Murakoshi
- Succeeded by: Hirotami Murakoshi
- Constituency: Chiba 5th

Personal details
- Born: 3 June 1972 (age 54) Takamatsu, Kagawa, Japan
- Party: Independent (since 2022)
- Other political affiliations: LDP (2002–2022)
- Education: University of Tokyo (LLB)
- Profession: Politician; reporter

Kentaro Sonoura (薗浦 健太郎, Sonoura Kentarō; born 3 June 1972) is a former Japanese politician who served in the House of Representatives in the Diet (national legislature). He represented the 5th District of Chiba prefecture as a member of the Liberal Democratic Party. A native of Takamatsu, Kagawa and graduate of the University of Tokyo, he worked as a reporter for the Yomiuri Shimbun and as an aide to Taro Aso. Sonoura was elected for the first time in the 2005 general election after an unsuccessful run in 2003.

Sonoura resigned from office on 21 December 2022 and was shortly afterwards convicted of violating the Political Fund Control Law.

== Honours ==
- Netherlands: Grand Officer of the Order of Orange-Nassau (29 October 2014)
