= Shinji Yoshida =

Japanese politician (born 1984)

- 吉田 真次
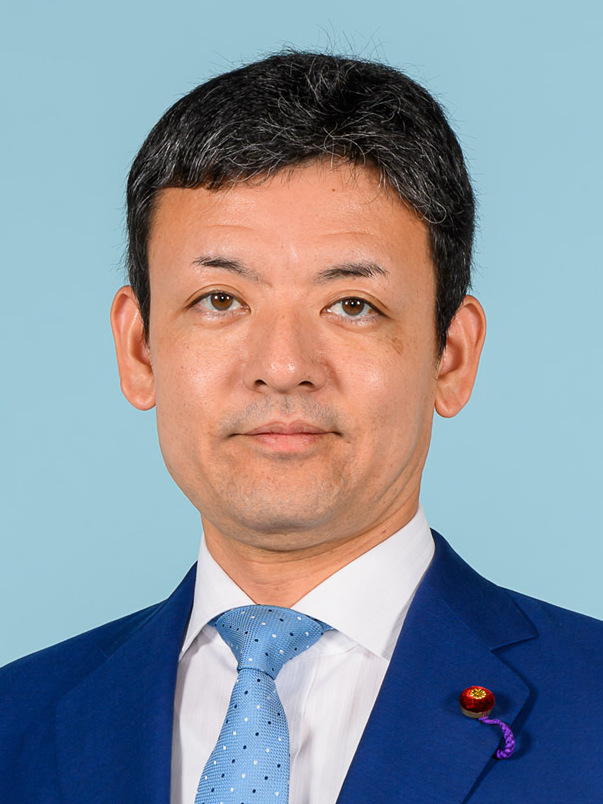
- Official portrait, 2025

Member of the House of Representatives
- Incumbent
- Assumed office 25 April 2023
- Preceded by: Shinzo Abe
- Constituency: Yamaguchi 4th (2023–2024); Chūgoku PR (2024–present)

Vice-Chairman of the Shimonoseki City Council
- In office 27 February 2019 – 2 March 2021

Member of the Shimonoseki City Council
- In office 2011–2023

Personal details
- Born: 6 July 1984 (age 42) Shimonoseki, Yamaguchi, Japan
- Party: Liberal Democratic
- Education: Kansai University
- Website: Official Website

Shinji Yoshida (Japanese: 吉田 真次; born 6 July 1984) is a Japanese politician. A member of the Liberal Democratic Party, he has served as a member of the House of Representatives since early 2023. Yoshida was previously a three-term member of the Shimonoseki city council, serving as its 15th vice-chairman.

Yoshida was first elected to the House of Representatives in Yamaguchi 4th, following the Assassination of Shinzo Abe.
