= Kojiro Takano =

Japanese politician

Kōjirō Takano
- 高野 光二郎
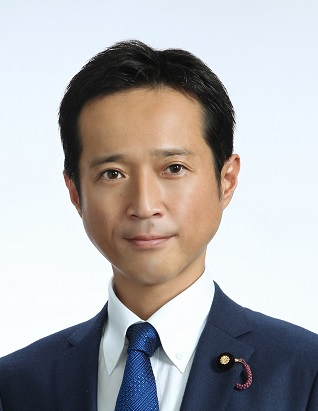
- Official portrait, 2015

Member of the House of Councillors
- In office 29 July 2013 – 22 June 2023
- Preceded by: Norio Takeuchi
- Succeeded by: Hajime Hirota
- Constituency: Kōchi at-large (2013–2019); Tokushima-Kōchi at-large (2019–2023)

Member of the Kōchi Prefectural Assembly
- In office 30 April 2003 – 2009
- Constituency: Kōchi City

Personal details
- Born: 4 September 1974 (age 51) Kōchi, Kōchi, Japan
- Party: Independent
- Other political affiliations: Liberal Democratic

Kōjirō Takano is a Japanese politician who served as a member of the House of Councillors of Japan.

== Political career ==
He was elected in 2013 and in 2019 for Tokushima, Kochi Prefecture. In June 2023, he resigned after confessing he had assaulted his secretary.
