= Yutaka Banno =

Japanese politician

- 伴野 豊
- Official portrait, 2008

Member of the House of Representatives
- In office 5 November 2021 – 23 January 2026
- Preceded by: Multi-member district
- Succeeded by: Tadahiko Ito
- Constituency: Tōkai PR (2021–2024); Aichi 8th (2024–2026)
- In office 19 December 2014 – 28 September 2017
- Constituency: Tōkai PR
- In office 25 June 2000 – 16 November 2012
- Preceded by: Multi-member district
- Succeeded by: Tadahiko Ito
- Constituency: Tōkai PR (2000–2003); Aichi 8th (2003–2005); Tōkai PR (2005–2009); Aichi 8th (2009–2012)

Personal details
- Born: 1 January 1961 (age 65) Tōkai, Aichi, Japan
- Party: CRA (since 2026)
- Other political affiliations: NFP (1994–1998); DPJ (1998–2016); DP (2016–2018); DPP (2018–2020); CDP (2020–2026)
- Education: Nagoya Institute of Technology

Yutaka Banno (伴野 豊, Banno Yutaka; born 1 January 1961) is a Japanese politician of the Constitutional Democratic Party, a member of the House of Representatives in the Diet (national legislature). A native of Nagoya, Aichi he attended Nagoya Institute of Technology both as undergraduate and graduate. Upon graduation, he joined Japanese National Railways in 1985 and JR Central in 1987 when Japanese National Railways was privatized. He left JR Central in 1994. In 2000 he was elected to the House of Representatives for the first time after an unsuccessful run in 1996.
