= Ryuzo Sasaki =

Japanese politician (1956–2022)

- 笹木 竜三
- Official portrait, 2011

Member of the House of Representatives
- In office 11 September 2005 – 16 November 2012
- Constituency: Hokuriku-Shin'etsu PR
- In office 18 July 1993 – 2 June 2000
- Preceded by: Takamori Makino
- Succeeded by: Isao Matsumiya
- Constituency: Fukui at-large (1993–1996); Fukui 1st (1996–2000)

Personal details
- Born: 27 November 1956 Fukui, Japan
- Died: 28 June 2022 (aged 65) Fukui, Japan
- Party: Independent
- Other political affiliations: NFP (1994–1998); DPJ (2005–2014)
- Education: Fukui Prefectural Fujishima High School; Waseda University

Ryuzo Sasaki (笹木 竜三, Sasaki Ryūzō; 27 November 1956 – 28 June 2022) was a Japanese politician of the Democratic Party of Japan, who served as a member of the House of Representatives in the Diet (national legislature).

== Early life ==
A native of Fukui, Sasaki attended Waseda University as both undergraduate and graduate.

== Political career ==
Sasaki was elected to the House of Representatives for the first time in 1993 as an independent after running unsuccessfully in 1990. He served from 1993 until 2000 as the representative for the Fukui at-large and Fukui 1st constituencies. He was once again elected in 2005 as a Hokuriku-Shin’etsu proportional representation member and served until 2012.
