= Hideo Hiraoka =

Japanese politician

- 平岡 秀夫
- Official portrait, 2008

Minister of Justice
- In office 2 September 2011 – 13 January 2012
- Prime Minister: Yoshihiko Noda
- Preceded by: Satsuki Eda
- Succeeded by: Toshio Ogawa

Member of the House of Representatives
- In office 1 November 2024 – 23 January 2026
- Constituency: Chūgoku PR
- In office 27 April 2008 – 16 December 2012
- Preceded by: Yoshihiko Fukuda
- Succeeded by: Nobuo Kishi
- Constituency: Yamaguchi 2nd
- In office 25 June 2000 – 15 April 2008
- Preceded by: Shinji Satō
- Succeeded by: Takashi Wada
- Constituency: Yamaguchi 2nd (2000–2005); Chūgoku PR (2005–2008)

Personal details
- Born: 14 January 1954 (age 72) Iwakuni, Yamaguchi, Japan
- Party: CRA (since 2026)
- Other political affiliations: DPJ (2000–2016); DP (2016–2018); DPP (2018); CDP (2018–2026)
- Education: University of Tokyo (LLB)
- Profession: Lawyer

Hideo Hiraoka (平岡 秀夫, Hiraoka Hideo; born 14 January 1954) is a Japanese politician and lawyer in the House of Representatives who served as the Minister of Justice from 2011 to 2012. He is a member of the Constitutional Democratic Party, having previously being a member of the Democratic Party of Japan. As a representative, he has represented the 2nd District of Yamaguchi prefecture and the Chūgoku proportional representation block.

== Early life ==
A native of Iwakuni, Yamaguchi, Hiraoka passed the bar exam and civil service exam prior to his graduation at the University of Tokyo. In 1976 he entered the Ministry of Finance which he joined before resigning in 1998 after working in the National Tax Agency's corporate tax department.

== Political career ==
In 2000, after leaving the ministry, he was elected to a seat of the House of Representatives for the first time; the district he represented, Yamaguchi Prefecture's No. 2 district, was previously a stronghold for the rival Liberal Democratic Party. Following a large-scale upturn by the Liberal Democratic Party, Hiraoka lost his seat by 588 votes, remaining in the Lower House through a process known as proportional representation. In 2008 he took back the Yamaguchi No. 2 seat, marking his fifth term as its representative for the Lower House. Hiraoka was later appointed state secretary for internal affairs and communications in 2010. In September 2011 he was appointed Minister of Justice in the cabinet of newly appointed prime minister Yoshihiko Noda.

He was defeated by Nobuo Kishi (a brother of Prime Minister Shinzo Abe and grandson of Prime Minister Nobusuke Kishi) in the 2012 Japanese general election, and lost his Diet seat. He unsuccessfully stood as a candidate in the 2013 Japanese House of Councillors election and 2014 Japanese general election.

In 2015, he retired from politics and moved to Tokyo to take up law practice at a firm in Ginza. Hiraoka later returned to politics and was re-elected in the 2024 election.

Political offices
Preceded by Satsuki Eda	Minister of Justice; 2011–2012	Succeeded by Toshio Ogawa
