= 2023 Ōita at-large district by-election =

← 2019	23 April 2023	2025 →

Ōita at-large district
- Turnout: 42.48%
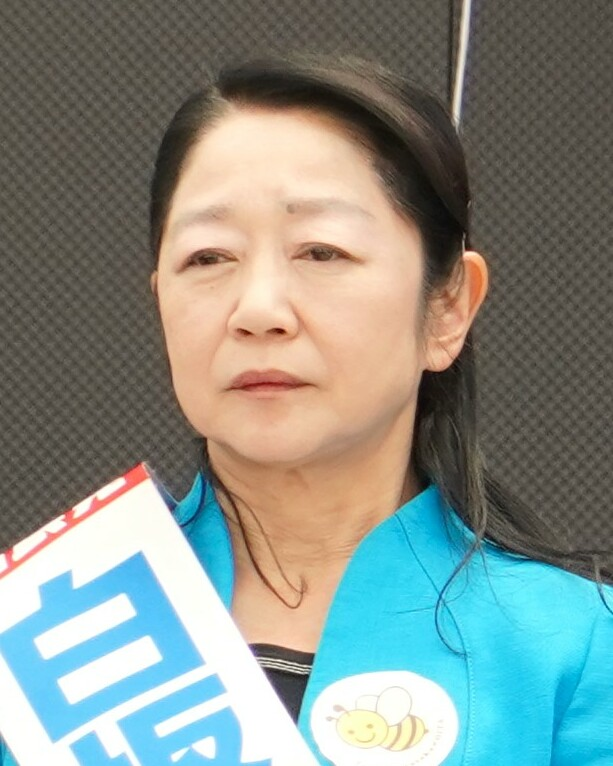

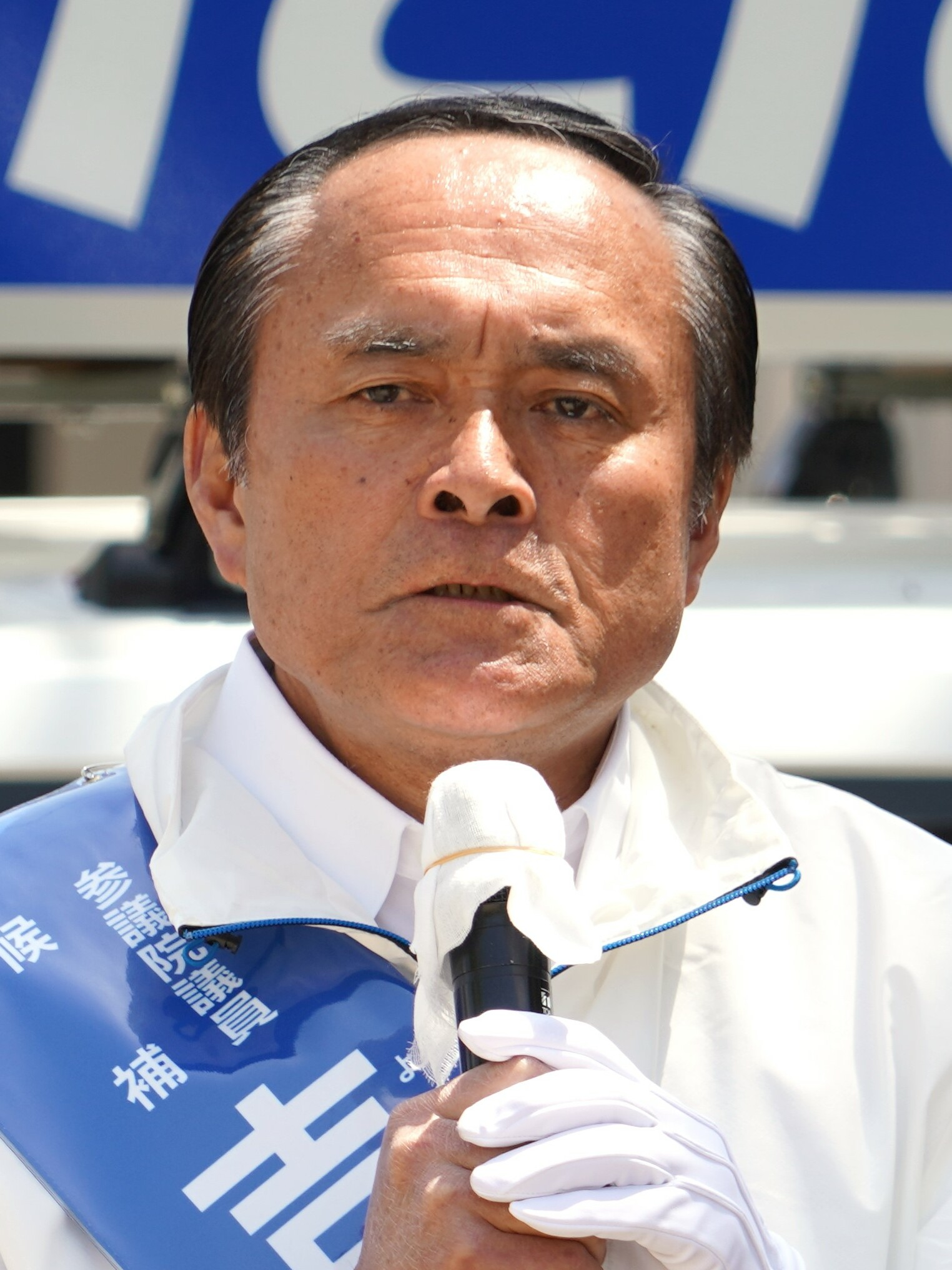
Nominee	Aki Shirasaka	Tadatomo Yoshida
Party	LDP	CDP
Popular vote	196,122	195,781
Percentage	50.04%	49.96%
Councillor before election
Kiyoshi Adachi
Independent
Elected Councillor
Aki Shirasaka
LDP

2023 Ōita at-large district by-election was held on 23 April 2023 because Kiyoshi Adachi resigned as a member of the House of Councillors.

== Background ==
In 2019 election, Kiyoshi Adachi, an independent recommended by four opposition parties, including the Former CDP, defeated Yōsuke Isozaki, a current member of the House of Councillors belonging to the Liberal Democratic Party, and was elected for the first time in Ōita at-large district. Meanwhile, in the 2022 election, Shinya Adachi, a member of the opposition Democratic Party For the People and a current member of the Oita at-large district, lost to the ruling LDP candidate because of the division of the opposition camp.

Adachi announced his candidacy for Ōita Prefecture gubernatorial election and resigned as a member of the House of Councillors on March 10, 2023. With Adachi's resignation, by-elections will be held on April 28, 2023, under the Election Law.

The LDP has nominated Aki Shirasaka, the owner of Inaba, a club in Ginza, as its candidate. On the other hand, main opposition party, the CDP, nominated Tadatomo Yoshida, a former leader of the Social Democratic Party who left the SDP and joined the CDP in 2020, as a candidate.

After the assassination of Shinzo Abe, the LDP's collusion with the Unification Church was discovered, and the match drew national attention as it was a one-on-one battle between the ruling and opposition parties amid falling approval ratings of the Kishida administration.

== Candidates ==
Name	Age	Party	Past positions
Aki Shirasaka	56	Liberal Democratic	Owner of the Inaba, a club in Ginza
Tadatomo Yoshida	67	Constitutional Democratic	Leader of the Social Democratic Party (2013-2018); Member of the House of Councillors (2010-2016) (2019-March 2023)

== Results ==
Shirasaka was elected for the first time by beating Yoshida by only 341 votes.

2023 Ōita at-large district by-election
Party	Candidate	Votes	%	±%
LDP	Aki Shirasaka	196,122	50.04%	+3.98
CDP	Tadatomo Yoshida	195,781	49.96%	New
Total votes		391,903	100.00%	
LDP gain from Independent				

=== Results by Municipalities ===
	Aki Shirasaka		Tadatomo Yoshida	
	Votes	%	Votes	%
Ōita city	59,082	45.56%	70,602	54.44%
Beppu	25,693	53.61%	22,235	46.39%
Nakatsu	18,756	53.65%	16,207	46.35%
Hita	15,560	53.25%	13,662	46.75%
Saiki	12,273	55.66%	9,778	44.34%
Usuki	5,798	42.79%	7,753	57.21%
Tsukumi	4,065	51.68%	3,801	48.32%
Taketa	5,488	64.24%	3,055	35.76%
Bungotakada	4,067	51.77%	3,789	48.23%
Kitsuki	4,669	48.54%	4,949	51.46%
Usa	13,218	51.68%	12,357	48.32%
Bungo-Ōno	6,279	50.29%	6,207	49.71%
Yufu	5,187	47.11%	5,823	52.89%
Kunisaki	4,876	49.45%	4,985	50.55%
Himeshima	1,051	79.26%	275	20.74%
Hiji	4,547	47.30%	5,066	52.70%
Kokonoe	1,555	50.13%	1,547	49.87%
Kusu	3,958	51.75%	3,690	48.25%
Total	196,122	50.04%	195,781	49.96%
