= 2018 Social Democratic Party (Japan) leadership election =

Political party election in Japan

2018 Social Democratic Party leadership election
- 10–11 February 2018
Candidate	Seiji Mataichi
Votes	Unopposed
Leader before election
Tadatomo Yoshida
Elected Leader
Seiji Mataichi

The Social Democratic Party of Japan held a leadership election to choose the successor to Tadatomo Yoshida, who declined to run for another term.

Secretary-General Seiji Mataichi was the only candidate running for the post, and therefore was elected unopposed. Mataichi was inaugurated into his 2-year term at the conclusion of the party conference on 25 February 2018.

== Summary ==
Contrary to initial prediction, incumbent Tadatomo Yoshida declined to run for another term as SDP leader, citing the need for the next leader to be an elected SDP lawmaker. As no one filed their candidacy before the original 12 January deadline, the submission deadline was extended to 26 January. In the ensuing weeks, party members pushed for one of its lawmakers to step in. It was anticipated that either Secretary-General Seiji Mataichi or the party's most junior lawmaker Hajime Yoshikawa would run for the leadership. Incumbent SDP lawmakers and Yoshida's supporters in the prefectural government in his native Ōita also urged Yoshida to rethink his decision and run for re-election, but he declined.

Following further consultations among SDP leaders, the party decided to support Seiji Mataichi to run as the next party leader. Mataichi's candidacy was officially endorsed by the party's three other lawmakers, Mizuho Fukushima, Kantoku Teruya and Hajime Yoshikawa. Mataichi submitted his candidacy on 26 January and was chosen unopposed as the next leader.

== Schedule ==
- ~~12 January (postponed)~~ 26 January: Deadline for submitting candidacies
- ~~27–28 January (postponed)~~ 10–11 February: Voting
- ~~29 January (postponed)~~ 12 February: Counting of votes
- 24 February: Party convention; declaration of election winner
- 24 February: Term as leader starts

== Candidates ==
=== Running ===
- Seiji Mataichi, secretary-general of the party and current member of the House of Councillors (2001–).

=== Declined ===
- Tadatomo Yoshida, incumbent party leader and former member of the House of Councillors (2010–2016).
- Hajime Yoshikawa, deputy secretary-general of the party and current member of the House of Representatives (2012–).

== Results ==
As Mataichi was the only candidate, there was no vote held and he was elected unopposed.
