= 2026 Social Democratic Party (Japan) leadership election =

Japanese political party leadership election

2026 Social Democratic Party leadership election
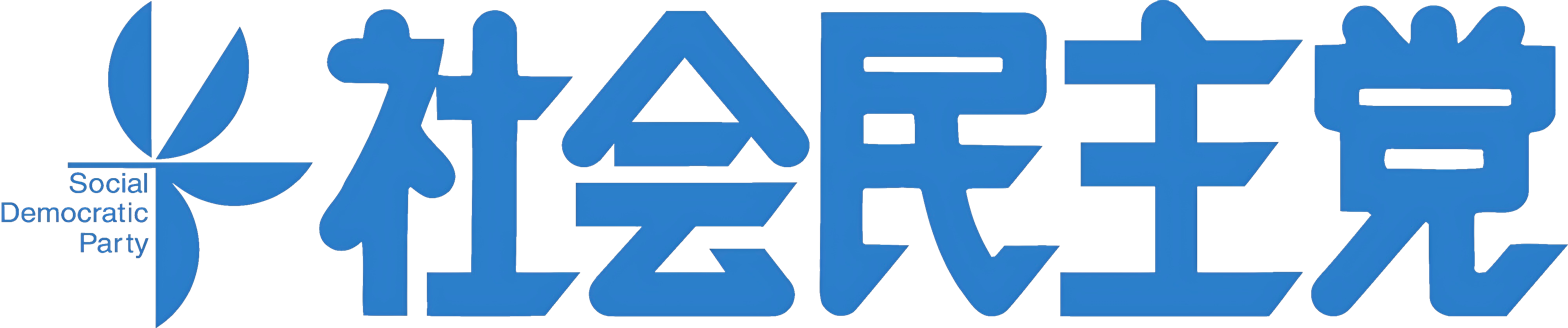
- 23 March 2026 (First); 6 April 2026 (Run-off)
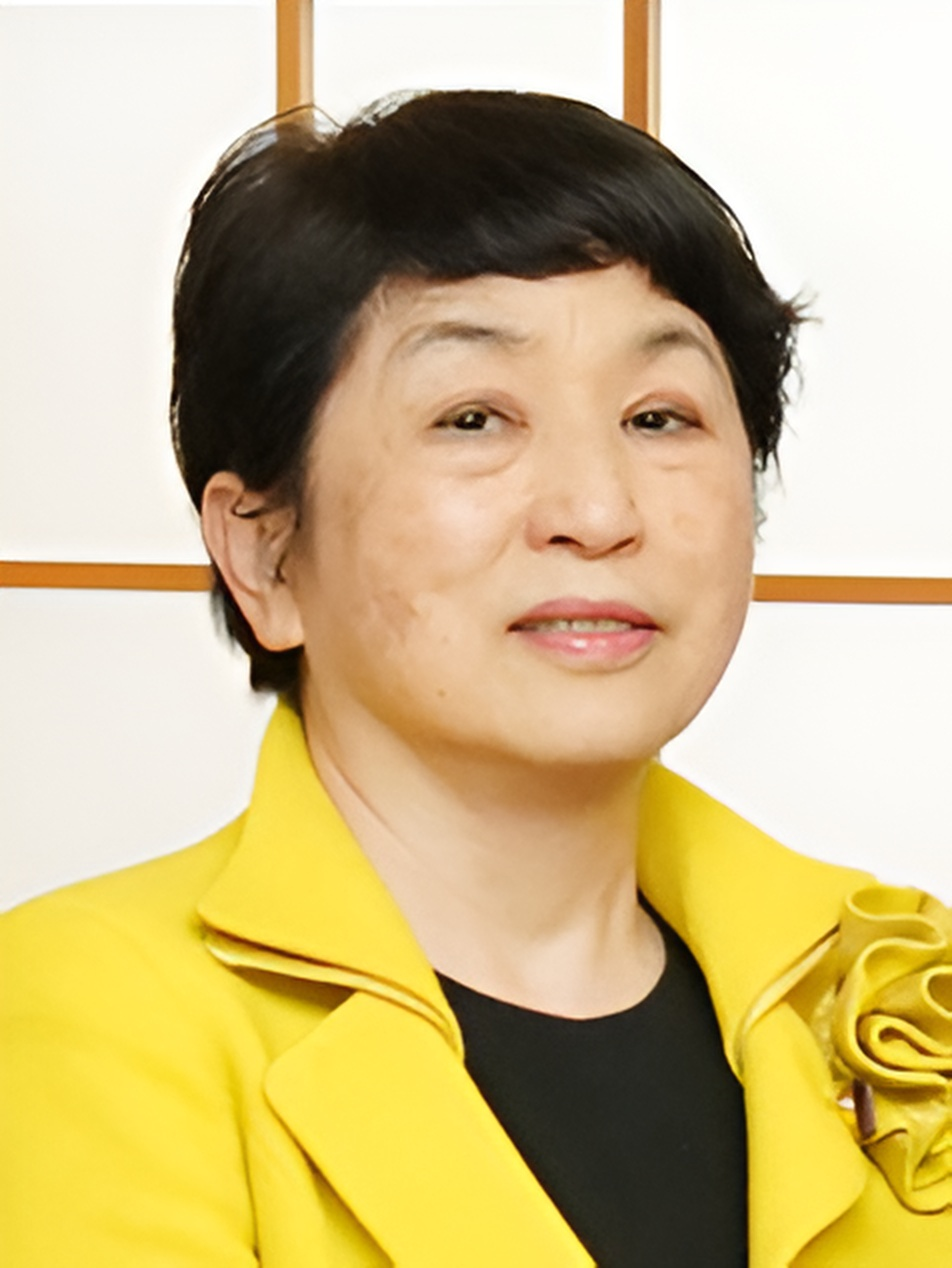

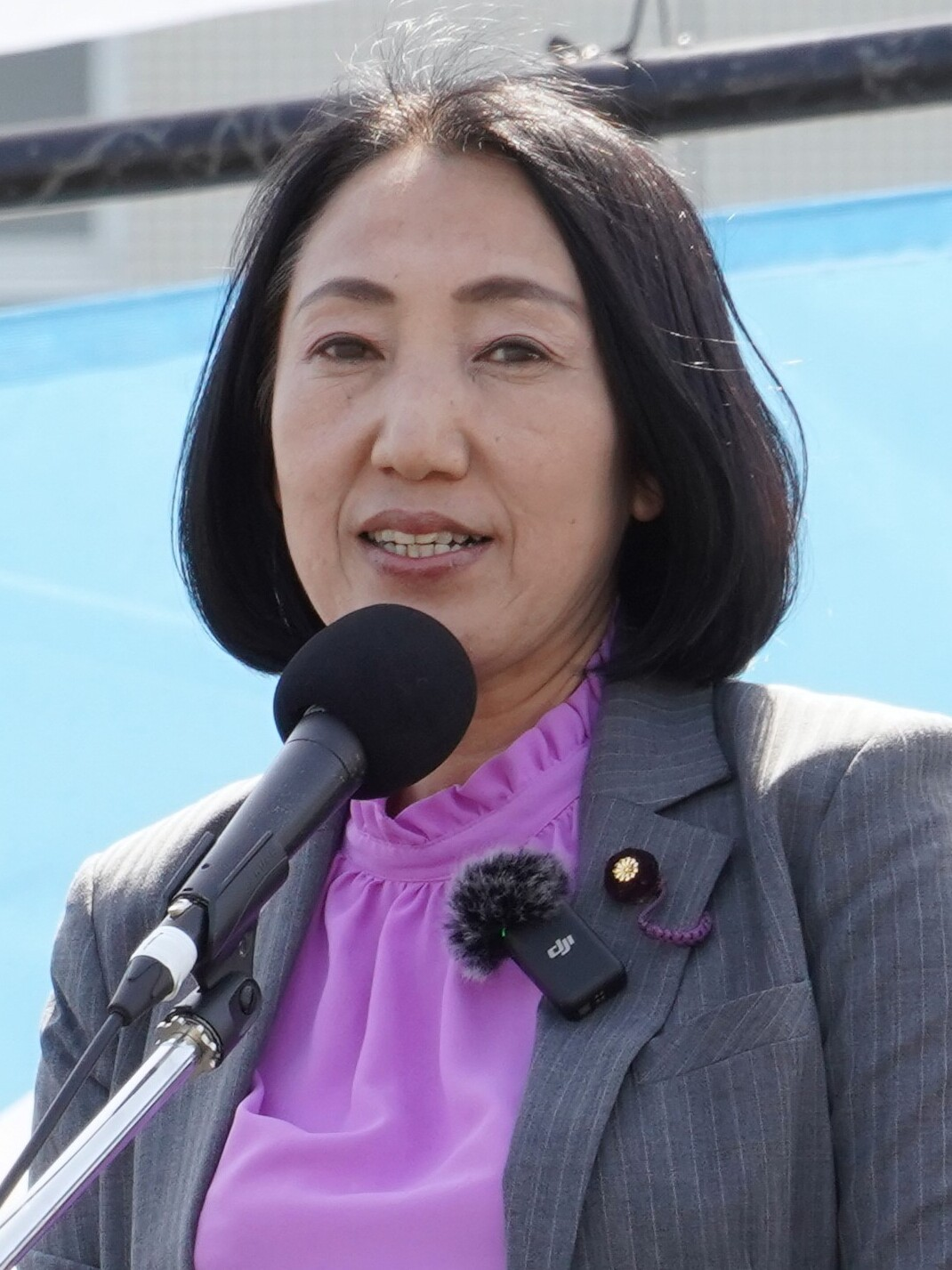

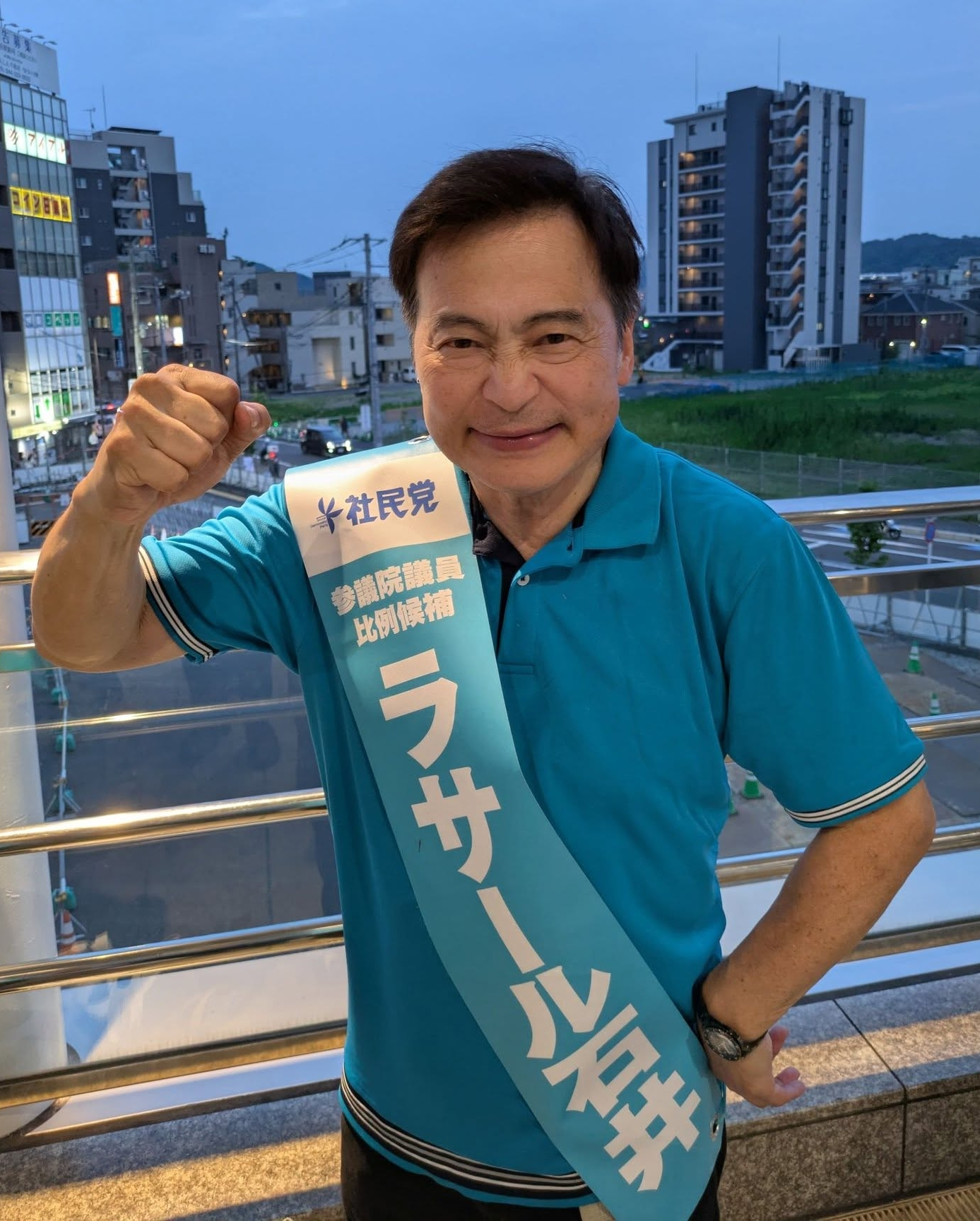
Candidate	Mizuho Fukushima	Yūko Ōtsubaki	LaSalle Ishii
First round	1,876 (45.31%)	1,297 (31.33%)	967 (23.36%)
Run-off vote	2,364 (56.88%)	1,792 (43.12%)	Eliminated
Chairperson before election
Mizuho Fukushima
Elected Chairperson
Mizuho Fukushima

The 2026 Social Democratic Party leadership election was held on 6 April 2026 to elect the next chairperson of the Social Democratic Party of Japan (SDP). The election was originally scheduled for 9 February 2026 but was postponed due to the 2026 general election following the dissolution of the House of Representatives.

== Background ==
In November 2025, Kunio Arakaki, the only House of Representatives member belonging to SDP, announced his intention to leave the party, citing a disagreement with the current chairwoman, Mizuho Fukushima. Following the approval of his leaving, SDP faced a historic crisis: for the first time - including the era of its predecessor, Japan Socialist Party (JSP) — the party held zero seats in the House of Representatives.

Meanwhile, in the 2026 general election, Fukushima officially nominated former House of Representative member Chobin Zukeran as Okinawa 2nd candidate, positioned as a "challenger" to unseat Arakaki, who had left the party. This move split the "All Okinawa" camp - a coalition united in opposition to the relocation of U.S. military bases. As a result of this division, both Arakaki and Zukeran failed to win their seats in the election.

Following the election, eight members of the Okinawa Prefectural Chapter of the SDP left the party, including Kanashi Kōki, who was party’s only member in the Okinawa Prefectural Assembly. The move was attributed to their dissatisfaction with the SDP headquarters' handling of the election.

The election was officially announced on 4 March, with three candidates entering the race: former vice chairwoman Yūko Ōtsubaki, current vice chairman LaSalle Ishii, and current chairwoman Fukushima. As party's first contested election in 13 years, the central focus was on strategies to revitalize the party’s declining political influence.

== Candidates ==
Name	Age	Career
Yūko Ōtsubaki (大椿裕子)	52	Former member of the House of Councillors; Former vice chairwoman of the SDP
LaSalle Ishii (ラサール石井)	70	Vice chairman of the SDP; Member of the House of Councillors
Mizuho Fukushima (福島瑞穂)	70	Current chairwoman of the SDP; Member of the House of Councillors

== Results ==
Since no candidate secured a majority of the votes in the first round, a run-off vote between the front-runner, Fukushima, and the runner-up, Ōtsubaki, was decided, in which Fukushima won.

Full results by round
Candidate	First Round		Run-off	
Candidate	Votes	%	Votes	%
Mizuho Fukushima当	1,876	45.31%	2,364	56.88%
Yūko Ōtsubaki	1,297	31.33%	1,792	43.12%
LaSalle Ishii	967	23.36%	Eliminated	
Total	4,140	100.00%	4,156	100.00%
Valid votes	4,140	97.14%	4,156	97.21%
Invalid and blank votes	122	2.86%	115	2.69%
Turnout	4,262	84.55%	4,271	84.72%
Registered voters	5,041	100.00%	5,086	100.00%
