= Yūko Ōtsubaki =

Japanese politician

- 大椿 裕子
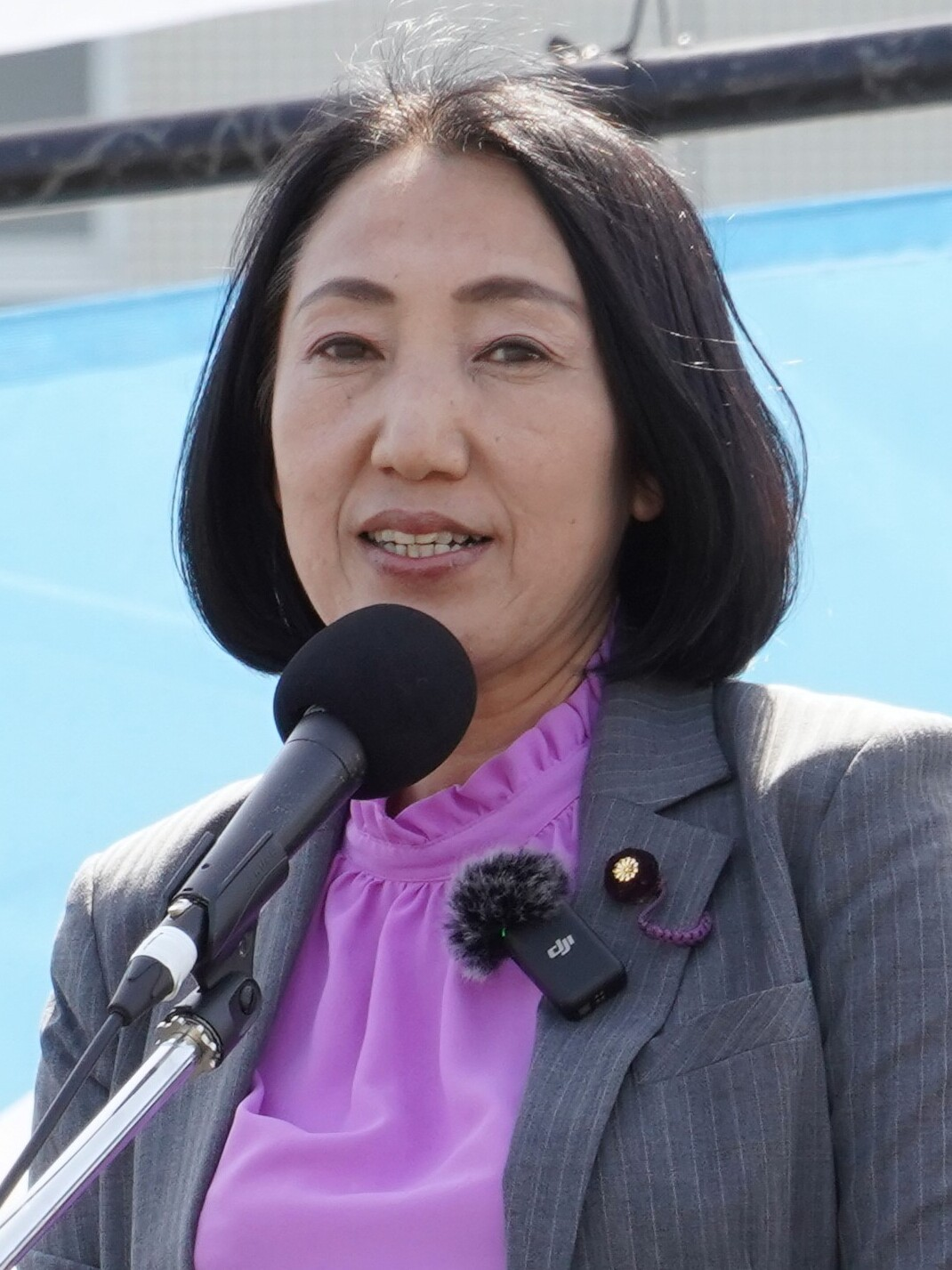
- Ōtsubaki in 2025

Member of the House of Councillors
- In office 7 April 2023 – 28 July 2025
- Preceded by: Tadatomo Yoshida
- Succeeded by: LaSalle Ishii
- Constituency: National PR

Personal details
- Born: 14 August 1973 (age 53) Takahashi, Okayama, Japan
- Party: Social Democratic
- Education: Takahashi High School
- Alma mater: Shikoku Gakuin University

Yūko Ōtsubaki (Japanese: 大椿 裕子, Hepburn: Ōtsubaki Yūko; born August 14, 1973) is a Japanese politician and labor activist. She was a member of the House of Councillors from 2023 to 2025, representing the Social Democratic Party (SDP), and served as a vice-chair of the party until 2026. She previously served as the chairperson of the Osaka Educational Workers' Union. She is married; her spouse is a Catalan from Barcelona.

== Biography ==
=== Early life and education ===
Otsubaki was born in Takahashi, Okayama Prefecture. She graduated from Okayama Prefectural Takahashi High School in 1992 and from the Department of Social Welfare, Faculty of Sociology at Shikoku Gakuin University in 1996. While living in Shikoku, she worked multiple non-regular jobs and obtained qualifications as a certified social worker and nursery teacher.

In 2002, she spent time studying informally on Negros Island in the Philippines. She later moved to Kobe, where her sister lived, and began working for an NPO, the Center for Disaster-Affected Persons with Disabilities, in 2004.

=== Career ===
In 2006, she was hired as a coordinator for students with disabilities at Kwansei Gakuin University on a fixed-term contract limited to four years. In 2010, she opposed the expiration of her contract and joined the Osaka Educational Workers' Union. She fought for reinstatement for three years and nine months but was not rehired. In 2016, she became chairperson of the union.

She stepped down from the position at the end of March 2019. In the House of Councillors election on July 21, 2019, she ran in the proportional representation block as a candidate for the Social Democratic Party. The party won one seat in the proportional representation, but Otsubaki, ranking fourth among the party's four candidates in vote count, was not elected.

In 2020, she was appointed Executive Committee Member of the SDP National Association and Chair of the Labor, Women, and Diversity Policy Committee. On April 16, her candidacy was announced for Osaka's 9th district in the 49th general election for the House of Representatives, representing the SDP.

On April 12, 2021, she became a vice-chair of the Social Democratic Party. In the general election held on October 31, she came in third in Osaka's 9th district and failed to secure a seat through the Kinki proportional block either.

In the July 10, 2022 House of Councillors election, the Social Democratic Party won one seat in the proportional representation block. Otsubaki was not elected, ranking fifth among the party's eight candidates.

On March 30, 2023, the House of Councillors accepted the resignation of Tadatomo Yoshida (Constitutional Democratic Party), who stepped down to run in the April 23 Oita Prefecture by-election. Since Yoshida was elected in 2019 as the top candidate on the SDP's proportional representation list, his replacement had to come from the SDP, not the CDP. The second and third candidates on the SDP list were no longer eligible (the second-ranked candidate, Mio Nakamura, had left the party in 2021 and joined the CDP), so Otsubaki, who was ranked fourth and last on the list, was next in line for succession. On April 6, 2023, her succession to the House of Councillors was officially confirmed. In the 211th Diet session, she was assigned to the Committee on Agriculture, Forestry and Fisheries. Anticipating the possibility of this succession, she withdrew her planned candidacy in the Osaka Prefectural Assembly election for Ibaraki City. Instead, Yumiko Nagasaki, head of the SDP Osaka branch, ran in her place but was unsuccessful.

In the 2025 House of Councillors election, although she secured the second-highest number of individual votes within the SDP, the party managed to win only a single seat; consequently, she was defeated, as the seat went to LaSalle Ishii, who had garnered a higher number of individual votes.

In January 2026, the SDP announced it would endorse Otsubaki as a standalone candidate to run on the proportional representation list for the Tokyo block in the 2026 general election, scheduled for February 2026.

In the general election for the House of Representatives, the SDP failed to secure any seats in the Tokyo block, resulting in her defeat.

On February 27, 2026, Otsubaki apologized for a January 2026 statement she made opposing the SDP's endorsement of Chobin Zukeran in the Okinawa 2nd district. In the same apology, she announced her resignation as Deputy Party Leader of the SDP.

On March 4, Otsubaki announced her candidacy for the SDP leadership election. Ballots from the first round of voting were tallied on the 23rd, and since neither Otsubaki either of the other two candidates secured an absolute majority of the votes, a runoff election was scheduled to be held between the top two finishers: incumbent Party Leader Mizuho Fukushima (1st place) and Otsubaki (2nd place). Ballots from the runoff election where counted on April 6 where Otsubaki was defeated by Fukushima. During a press conference, party leadership denied Otsubaki the opportunity to speak, with Fukushima stating, "Today is my press conference regarding my assumption of office." Otsubaki protested this, saying, "That is outrageous; candidates should be treated equally," and stormed out of the room.

== Policy positions ==
=== Constitution ===
- In a 2022 NHK questionnaire, Otsubaki stated that she opposes any revision of the Constitution.
- Regarding revision of Article 9, she told a 2022 Mainichi Shimbun survey that she opposes amending the war‑renouncing clause. In the same NHK poll she also opposed explicitly writing the Self‑Defense Forces into Article 9.
- She is against creating an emergency‑powers clause through constitutional amendment, according to the 2022 NHK survey.

=== Foreign and security policy ===
- Otsubaki answered that she opposes Japan acquiring "enemy‑base strike capability" in the 2022 NHK questionnaire.
- Asked about Japan’s sanctions on Russia after the full‑scale invasion of Ukraine that began on 24 February 2022, she declined to answer in the NHK poll but told Mainichi Shimbun that the current sanctions are appropriate.
- After the cabinet approved the 7 June 2022 Basic Policy on Economic and Fiscal Management and Reform, which cited raising defense spending to “around 2 percent of GDP” within five years, Otsubaki said defense outlays "should be drastically reduced" in the NHK survey.
- On improving Japan–South Korea relations amid disputes over wartime labor and “comfort women,” she replied in the Mainichi poll that "both sides should make concessions".

=== Gender equality ===
- She supports introduction of the optional separate surname system for married couples (selected surname system).
- She favors legalizing same‑sex marriage.
- She supports adopting gender quotas to boost women's political representation.

=== Employment and labor ===
- A member of Japan's "employment ice‑age generation," Otsubaki became active in the labor movement after experiencing non‑regular employment and a contract non‑renewal at Kwansei Gakuin University.
- She advocates "entry regulation" on non‑regular employment—that is, tightening the conditions under which employers can hire on non‑regular contracts.

=== Other issues ===
- Asked about Japan's future reliance on nuclear power, she replied that it should be reduced to zero.
- She told Mainichi Shimbun that Abenomics "cannot be positively evaluated and should be reviewed".
- She supports lowering the minimum age of eligibility to run for the National Diet.
- Concerning the 1942 flooding accident at the Chōsei Coal Mine (part of the Ube coalfield), she holds that the national government should take responsibility for recovering the remains of the victims.
