= Taiga Ishikawa =

Japanese politician and LGBT activist

- 石川 大我
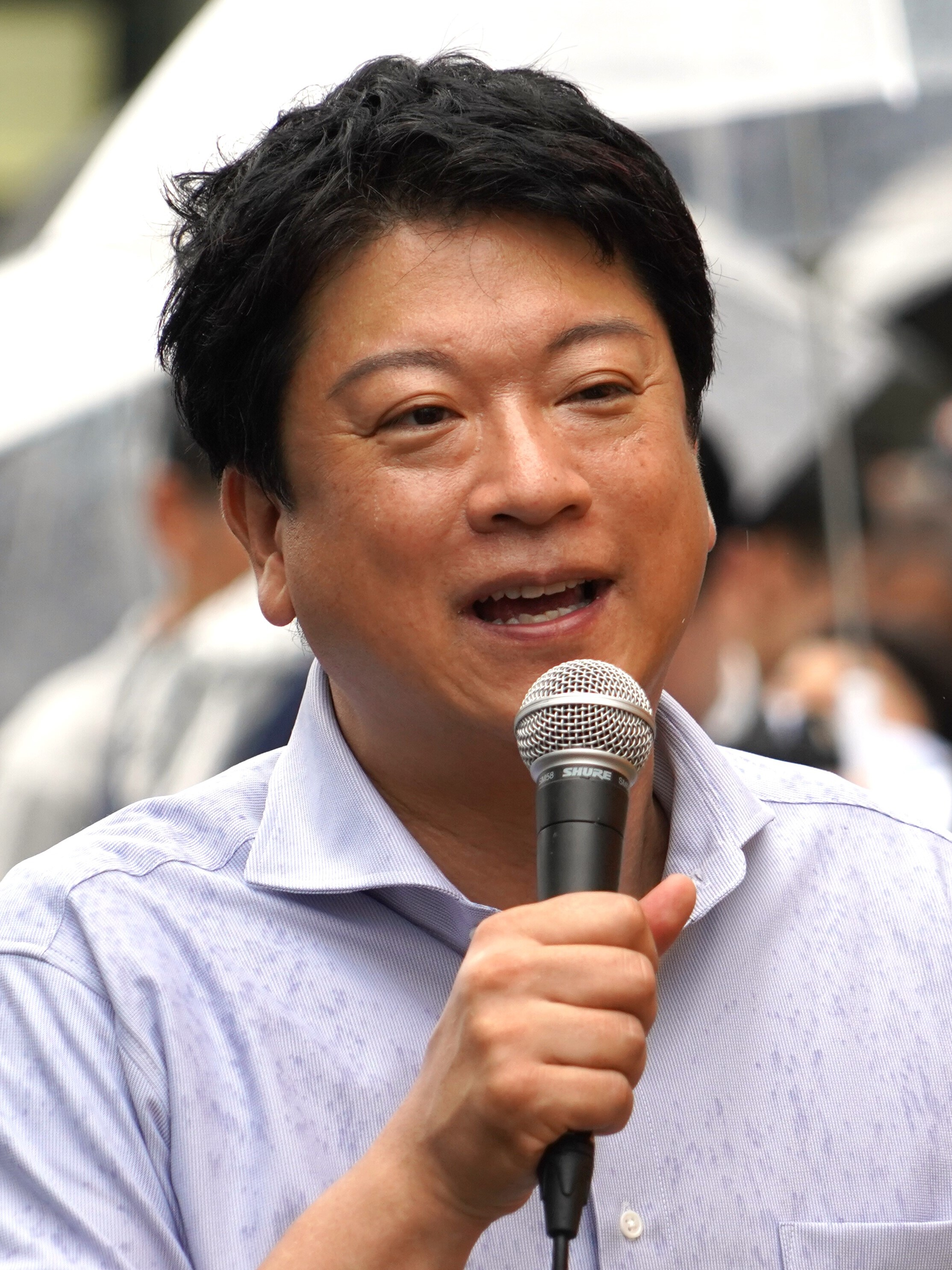
- Ishikawa in 2024

Member of the House of Councillors
- In office 29 July 2019 – 28 July 2025
- Constituency: National PR

Member of the Toshima City Assembly
- In office 1 May 2015 – 30 April 2019
- In office 1 May 2011 – 2 December 2014

Personal details
- Born: 3 July 1974 (age 52) Toshima, Tokyo, Japan
- Party: Constitutional Democratic (since 2018)
- Other political affiliations: SDP (2011–2018)
- Education: Meiji Gakuin University; Waseda University
- Website: Official website

Taiga Ishikawa (石川 大我, Ishikawa Taiga; born 1974) is a Japanese politician and LGBT activist. He was elected to the House of Councillors in the 2019 Japanese House of Councillors election, becoming the first openly-gay man to be elected to either chamber of the National Diet. Previously, he became one of the first two openly gay male politicians to win an election in Japanese history when he was elected in April 2011 to a seat in the Tokyo's Toshima ward assembly. Wataru Ishizaka, also openly gay, was elected in the same election to the Nakano ward council in Tokyo. Before he was elected to the city council, he was Mizuho Fukushima's chief of staff.

== Personal life and activism ==
A graduate of the Meiji Gakuin University School of Law and a native of Sugamo, he previously served as a secretary to SDP chair Mizuho Fukushima, and founded the gay male support organization Peer Friends in 2004. He came out in 2002 at the age of 28 through a memoir, Where is My Boyfriend? (Boku no kareshi wa doko ni iru?). He has since been active in the Japanese LGBT rights movement and has appeared in various series, including NHK's Heart-to-Heart, and has participated in the Tokyo Pride Parade.

== Political career ==
In October 2013, he ran for Social Democratic Party party chairmanship but lost to National Diet Councilor Tadatomo Yoshida. The first openly gay candidate for leadership of a sitting parliamentary party in Japanese history, Ishikawa was recognized after the election by an editorial in The Japan Times as one who could both "be a valuable asset for the SDP" and "help channel the voices of marginalized people, including irregularly employed workers and members of the gay community, to ensure that they are reflected in local and national politics".

Ishikawa left the SDP in 2018 and received the nomination of the Constitutional Democratic Party of Japan in November for the 2019 House of Councillors election.

== Political positions ==
=== Same-sex matrimonial rights ===
He helped to successfully lobby the Japanese government to amend the certificate allowing Japanese citizens to marry foreign nationals of the same sex in countries where same-sex marriage is legal. He is campaigning for the creation of a municipal domestic partnership registry for Toshima which would grant ward-managed housing and hospital visitation rights.

== Words and actions ==
In the middle of the night on March 20, 2020, at Shinjuku Ni-chōme, the biggest gay village in Tokyo, Japan, Ishikawa suddenly filmed a police car on patrol. A police officer noticed him and questioned what he was doing, but he ignored the officer and continued to film the video. When the officer asked him to stop filming, he said, "It's my hobby to film the cops who walk pompously around Shinjuku Ni-chōme," "The police have no right of publicity," "Tell me your name and let me film your police notebook," etc. When other officers arrived after his own report to the police, he said, "I'm a member of the National Diet, you must have been scared." In response to an interview by Asagei Biz about this trouble, he replied in writing that he was "not aware of any trouble" with the officers and that there was "nothing in particular" that he did not agree with the officers' behavior.

In May 2020, Ishikawa participated in an anti-racism protest demonstration around the Shibuya Police Station in Japan. The protest was caused by a video posted on social networking sites that came from a Kurdish man who claimed that he had been subjected to intimidating job questioning by members of the Shibuya Police Station of the Tokyo Metropolitan Police Department along with other departments. The Kurdish man also claimed that he and his Kurdish friends had been subjected to excessive physical force, such as being pushed to the ground by Japanese police officers. Ishikawa stated the reason for his participation, "At the National Diet, after receiving an explanation from the Kurdish man himself, and after reviewing the video of the questioning, I determined that there was unfair treatment, such as the fact that the police officers took away the man's cell phone while he was recording a video, and that the police officers then attempted to delete the video.”

Shortly before Shinzo Abe announced his resignation from the position of Prime Minister of Japan on August 28, 2020, citing worsening ulcerative colitis, Ishikawa posted a tweet calling for accountability, saying that Abe would not be allowed to hide behind the clouds.
