= Chief O'Hara =

Chief O'Hara or Chief Ohara may refer to a number of fictional characters, all of which are chiefs of police:

- Chief O'Hara (Disney Comics), a character in Mickey Mouse stories
- Chief Daijiro Ohara, a character in the manga KochiKame: Tokyo Beat Cops

== Batman ==
- Chief Miles O'Hara, who appeared in the 1966-1968 Batman television series
- Chief Clancy O'Hara, the first victim of the Hangman killer in the Batman: Dark Victory comic book series
