= Kiichiro Satō =

Japanese politician

- 佐藤 樹一郎
- Satō in 2025

Governor of Ōita Prefecture
- Incumbent
- Assumed office 28 April 2023
- Monarch: Naruhito
- Preceded by: Katsusada Hirose

Mayor of Ōita City
- In office 27 April 2015 – 2 March 2023
- Preceded by: Ban Kugimiya
- Succeeded by: Shinya Adachi

Personal details
- Born: 28 November 1957 (age 68) Ōita, Ōita, Japan
- Party: Independent
- Education: University of Tokyo (BEc)

Kiichiro Satō (佐藤 樹一郎, Satō Kiichirō; born 28 November 1957) is a Japanese politician. He currently serves as governor of Ōita Prefecture since 2023.
