= Wataru Ishizaka =

Japanese politician

- Born: 1976 (age 49–50); Ota-ku, Tokyo, Japan
- Occupation: Politician

Wataru Ishizaka (石坂 わたる, Ishizaka Wataru; born 1976) is a Japanese politician, social worker and former school teacher for the disabled. He became one of the first two openly gay male politicians elected to office in Japanese history in April 2011 when he was elected to the Nakano, Tokyo ward council. The other was Taiga Ishikawa, who was elected to the Toshima ward council.

== Early years ==
Born in Ota-ku, Tokyo, Ishizaka grew up in Inagi City.

== Education ==
In March 2000, he graduated from Seikei University, as part of the Faculty of Economics, Department of Economics, International Society Course. In 2001, he completed the Department of Developmental Disorder Education, Special Course of Special Education, Chiba University . In 2002, he became a teacher at Asahi Yogo School.

In 2010, he completed the master's program at the Graduate School of Social Design, 21st Century, Rikkyo University.

== Career ==
In the election on April 24, 2011, he became Japan's first openly gay public officer with Taiga Ishikawa, who was first elected to the Toshima Ward Parliament on the same day. He is also the first member of the Nakano Ward to have a mental health worker qualification.

On July 6, 2017, he helped to establish the "LGBT municipality Parliamentary League." It aims to spread regulations and measures to protect the human rights of sexual minorities to local governments throughout the country through local assembly.
