= Yōsuke Isozaki =

Japanese politician

Yosuke Isozaki
- 礒崎 陽輔
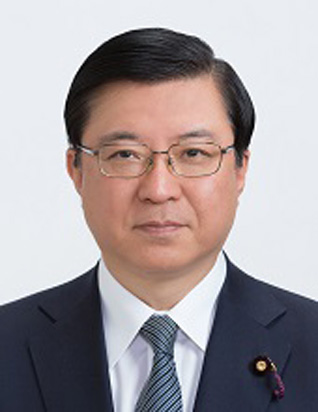
- Official portrait, 2017

State Minister of Agriculture, Forestry and Fisheries
- In office 3 August 2017 – 2 October 2018
- Prime Minister: Shinzo Abe
- Minister: Ken Saito
- Deputy: Taro Aso

Member of the House of Councillors
- In office 29 July 2007 – 28 July 2019
- Preceded by: Hiroko Goto
- Succeeded by: Kiyoshi Adachi
- Constituency: Ōita at-large

Personal details
- Born: 9 October 1957 (age 68) Ōita City, Ōita, Japan
- Party: Liberal Democratic
- Education: University of Tokyo

Yōsuke Isozaki (礒崎 陽輔, Isozaki Yōsuke; born 9 October 1957) is a Japanese politician of the Liberal Democratic Party and a member of the House of Councillors in the Diet. A native of Ōita, Ōita, he joined the Ministry of Home Affairs after graduating from the University of Tokyo in 1982. After leaving the ministry in 2006, he was elected to the House of Councillors for the first time in 2007. He is affiliated with the revisionist lobby Nippon Kaigi.
