= Ōita at-large district =

Japan House of Councillors constituency

- 大分県選挙区
- Parliamentary constituency for the House of Councillors
- Prefecture: Ōita
- Electorate: 950,450 (as of September 2022)

Current constituency
- Created: 1947
- Seats: 2
- Councillors: Class of 2019: Aki Shirasaka (Note: Shirasaka was elected in a by-election in 2023, following Kiyoshi Adachi resigning to run for Governor of Ōita Prefecture.) (LDP); Class of 2022: Harutomo Koshō (LDP)

Ōita at-large district is a constituency in the House of Councillors of Japan, the upper house of the Diet of Japan (national legislature). It currently elects 2 members to the House of Councillors, 1 per election. It is unique among other Kyushu conservative kingdoms for its willingness to elect opposition members. Shinya Adachi held the districts first seat from 2004, and Kiyoshi Adachi held the second seat until his resignation in 2023, with Tadatomo Yoshida losing the by-election after by an extremely slim margin. This is possibly due to the presence of the city of Ōita, which has shown a willingness to support opposition candidates; it was historically also represented by a second Japan Socialist Party Councilor.

== Elected members of House of Councillors ==
Class of (1947/1953/...)	Election	Class of (1950/1956/...)
#1 1947: #1, 6 Year Term	Election	#1 1947: #2, 3 Year Term
Jinzo Iwao (NCP)	1947	Masaji Hitotsumatsu (LP)
Jinzo Iwao (NCP)	1950	Masaji Hitotsumatsu (Yoshida LP)
Fumio Gotō (Indep.)	1953	Masaji Hitotsumatsu (Yoshida LP)
Fumio Gotō (Indep.)	1956	Yoshitaka Goto (LDP)
Haruzo Murakami (LDP)	1959	Yoshitaka Goto (LDP)
Haruzo Murakami (LDP)	1962	Yoshitaka Goto (LDP)
Haruzo Murakami (LDP)	1965	Yoshitaka Goto (LDP)
Haruzo Murakami (LDP)	1968	Yoshitaka Goto (LDP)
Ryohei Kudo (JSP)	1971	Yoshitaka Goto (LDP)
Ryohei Kudo (JSP)	1974	Hidekazu Iwao † 1976 (LDP)
Ryohei Kudo (JSP)	1976 by-election	Masao Goto (OFF)
Seishirō Etō (ATSNS)	1977	Masao Goto (OFF)
Seishirō Etō (ATSNS)	1980	Masao Goto (LDP)
Keigi Kajiwara (JSP)	1983	Masao Goto (LDP)
Keigi Kajiwara (JSP)	1986	Masao Goto (LDP)
Keigi Kajiwara (JSP)	1989	Masao Goto (LDP)
Keigi Kajiwara (JSP)	1992	Ban Kugimiya (LDP)
Keigi Kajiwara (JSP)	1995	Ban Kugimiya (LDP)
Keigi Kajiwara (JSP)	1998	Toshiya Nakamichi (LDP)
Hiroko Goto (LDP)	2001	Toshiya Nakamichi (LDP)
Hiroko Goto (LDP)	2004	Shinya Adachi (DPJ)
Yōsuke Isozaki (LDP)	2007	Shinya Adachi (DPJ)
Yōsuke Isozaki (LDP)	2010	Shinya Adachi (DPJ)
Yōsuke Isozaki (LDP)	2013	Shinya Adachi (DPJ)
Yōsuke Isozaki (LDP)	2016	Shinya Adachi (DP)
Kiyoshi Adachi (Indep.)	2019	Shinya Adachi (DP)
Kiyoshi Adachi (Indep.)	2022	Harutomo Kosho (LDP)
Aki Shirasaka (LDP)	2023 by-election	Harutomo Kosho (LDP)

OFF - Oita Farrmers Federation ASTNS - Association To Send a New Style to National Politics †: Died in Office

== Election results ==
2023 by-election
Party	Candidate	Votes	%	±%
LDP	Aki Shirasaka	196,122	50.04	▲3.46
CDP	Tadatomo Yoshida	195,781	49.96	New
Registered electors		943,477		
Turnout			42.48	▼10.50

2022
Party	Candidate	Votes	%	±%
LDP	Harutomo Kosho	228,417	46.58	▲0.52
DPP	Shinya Adachi (Incumbent)	183,258	37.37	New
JCP	Kai Yamashita	35,705	7.28	▼3.73
Sanseitō	Yūko Shigematsu	21,723	4.43	New
Anti-NHK	Taizo Ninomiya	10,770	2.20	▼2.19
Independent	Yūichi Kotegawa	10,512	2.14	New
Registered electors		950,511		
Turnout			52.98	▲2.44

2019
Party	Candidate	Votes	%	±%
Independent	Kiyoshi Adachi	236,153	49.55	New
LDP	Yōsuke Isozaki (Incumbent)	219,498	46.06	▼1.88
Anti-NHK	Taizo Ninomiya	20,909	4.39	New
Registered electors		969,453		
Turnout			50.54	▼7.84

2016
Party	Candidate	Votes	%	±%
DP	Shinya Adachi (Incumbent)	271,783	48.13	New
LDP	Harutomo Kosho	270,693	47.94	▼2.04
HRP	Atsuko Ueda	22,153	3.92	▲1.08
Registered electors		989,634		
Turnout			58.38	▲5.23

2013
Party	Candidate	Votes	%	±%
LDP	Yōsuke Isozaki (Incumbent)	250,915	49.98	▲7.41
Independent	Shintaro Goto	137,049	27.30	New
JCP	Kai Yamashita	55,249	11.01	▲2.26
YP	Hideki Urano	44,542	8.87	New
HRP	Atsuko Ueda	14,265	2.84	New
Registered electors		981,222		
Turnout			53.15	▼9.81

2010
Party	Candidate	Votes	%	±%
DPJ	Shinya Adachi (Incumbent)	294,286	48.68	▼6.14
LDP	Kiyoshi Odawara	257,322	42.57	▲9.93
JCP	Kai Yamashita	52,863	8.75	▲2.57
Registered electors		990,648		
Turnout			62.96	▲5.23
