= Tadatomo Yoshida =

Japanese politician

- 吉田 忠智
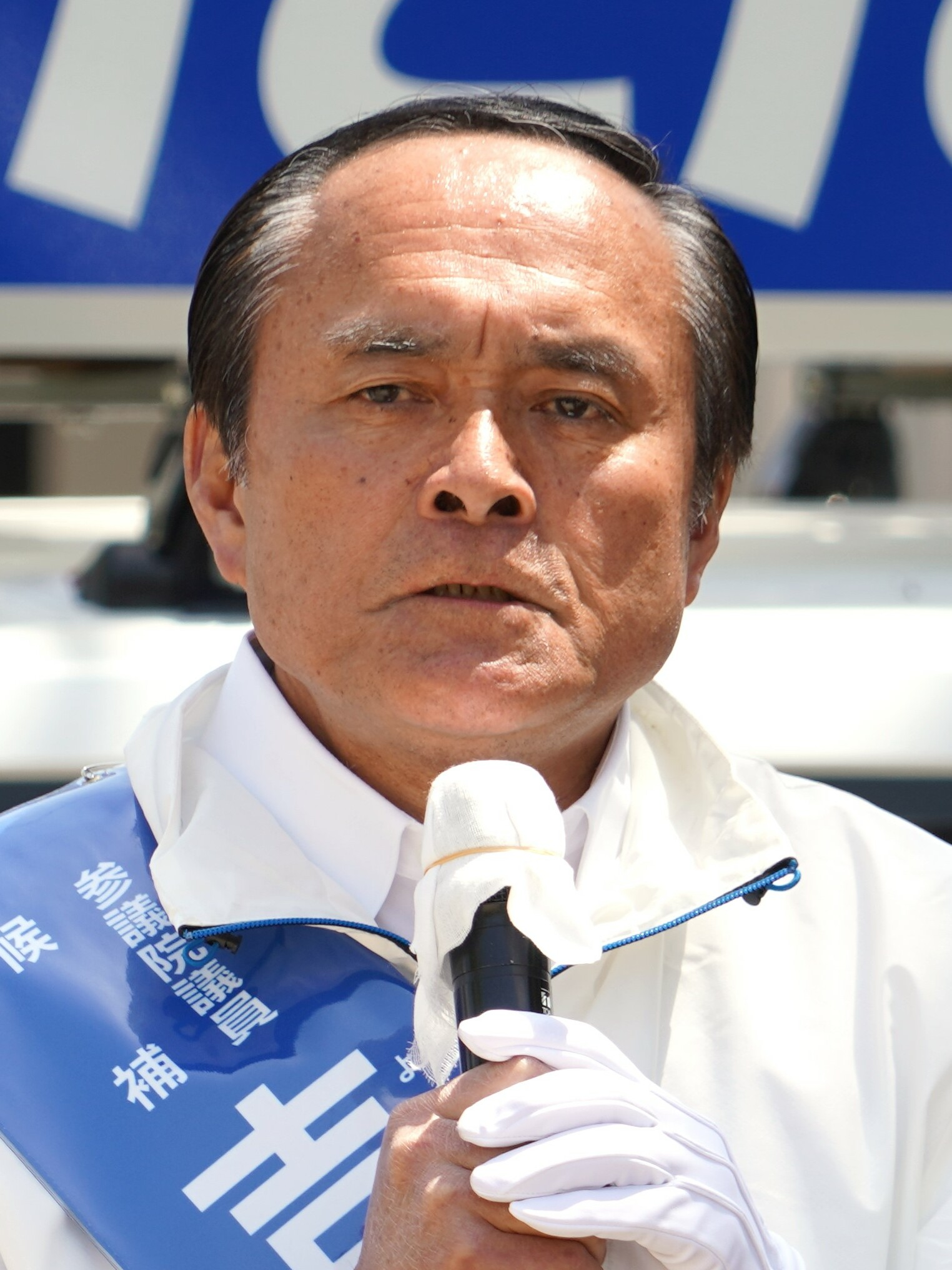
- Yoshida in 2023

Chairman of the Social Democratic Party
- In office 14 October 2013 – 25 February 2018
- Preceded by: Seiji Mataichi (acting)
- Succeeded by: Seiji Mataichi

Member of the House of Councillors
- Incumbent
- Assumed office 20 July 2025
- Preceded by: Aki Shirasaka
- Constituency: Ōita at-large
- In office 29 July 2019 – 30 March 2023
- Preceded by: Seiji Mataichi
- Succeeded by: Yūko Ōtsubaki
- Constituency: National PR
- In office 26 July 2010 – 25 July 2016
- Preceded by: Sadao Fuchigami
- Succeeded by: Multi-member district
- Constituency: National PR

Member of the Ōita Prefectural Assembly
- In office August 2000 – April 2010
- Constituency: Ōita City

Personal details
- Born: 7 March 1956 (age 70) Usuki, Ōita, Japan
- Party: CDP (since 2020)
- Other political affiliations: SDP (2000–2020)
- Education: Kyushu University

Tadatomo Yoshida (吉田 忠智, Yoshida Tadatomo; born 7 March 1956 in Usuki, Ōita Prefecture) is a Japanese politician currently serving as a member of the House of Councillors for Ōita at-large district; he previously represented the National PR block, having been elected on two separate occasions in 2010 and in 2019. He previously served as a member of the Ōita Prefectural Assembly from 2000 to 2010.

== Early life and career ==
Born in Usuki, Oita Prefecture, Yoshida was enrolled at Oita Prefectural Tsurusaki Technical High School with the goal of becoming an athlete. However, due to a knee injury, he abandoned this goal and changed course to continue his studies. After a year of studying for university entrance exams, he entered the Faculty of Agriculture at Kyushu University, from which he graduated in 1979. He then began working for the Oita Prefectural Government as an agricultural civil engineering technician. He was actively involved in labour union work, and served as secretary general and chairman of the Executive Committee of the Oita Prefectural Government Employees' Union.

== Political career ==
In 2013, Yoshida was a candidate for the presidency of the Social Democratic Party. He defeated Tokyo City Toshima Ward Councillor Taiga Ishikawa, the first openly gay SDP elected politician, by a vote of 9,986 to 2,239 on 14 October 2013, and was inaugurated as the party president on 26 October 2013.

After a disappointing result in the 2016 upper house election, he announced his resignation as head of the party. He eventually retracted his resignation after the party urged him not to resign. Yoshida concluded his term as president on 25 February 2018. Yoshida is planning to run again for elected office in the future.

On 24 December 2020, Yoshida submitted a notice of withdrawal from the Social Democratic Party and a notice of admission to the Constitutional Democratic Party, both of which were accepted on the same day.

In March 2023, he resigned from his proportional seat in the House of Councillors to run as a candidate in the upcoming Ōita at-large district by-election for its 2019 class majoritarian seat, after incumbent Kiyoshi Adachi resigned in order to run for governor. He was nominated by the CDP with support from the JCP and SDP, but would go on to narrowly lose to the by-election by a margin of 341 votes to LDP candidate Aki Shirasaka.

Party political offices
Preceded by Seiji Mataichi; Acting	Chair of the Social Democratic Party; 14 October 2013 – 25 February 2018	Succeeded by Seiji Mataichi
