= Social Democratic Party (Japan) =

Political party in Japan

Social Democratic Party 社会民主党 Shakai Minshu-tō
- President: Mizuho Fukushima
- Founded: 19 January 1996; 30 years ago
- Preceded by: Japan Socialist Party
- Headquarters: 2-4-3-7F Nagata-cho, Chiyoda-ku, Tokyo 100-0014
- Newspaper: Shakai Shimpō
- Ideology: Social democracy Progressivism; Pacifism
- Political position: Centre-left to left-wing
- International affiliation: Socialist International
- Colours: Sky blue
- Senators: 2 / 248
- Representatives: 0 / 465
- Prefectural assembly members: 6 / 2,614
- Municipal assembly members: 81 / 28,940

Website
- sdp.or.jp

The Social Democratic Party (社会民主党, Shakai Minshu-tō; often abbreviated to 社民党, Shamin-tō; SDP) is a political party in Japan that was established in 1996. Since its reformation and name change in 1996, it has advocated pacifism and defined itself as a social-democratic party. It was previously known as the Japan Socialist Party (日本社会党, Nihon Shakaitō; abbreviated to JSP in English).

The party was re-founded in January 1996 by the majority of legislators of the former Japan Socialist Party, which was the largest opposition party in the 1955 System. However, most of those legislators joined the Democratic Party of Japan after that. Five leftist legislators who did not join the SDP formed the New Socialist Party, which lost all its seats in the following election. The SDP enjoyed a short period of government participation from 1993 to 1994 as part of the Hosokawa Cabinet and later formed a coalition government with the Liberal Democratic Party under 81st Prime Minister Tomiichi Murayama of the JSP from 1994 to January 1996. The SDP was part of ruling coalitions between January and November 1996 (First Hashimoto Cabinet) and from 2009 to 2010 (Yukio Hatoyama Cabinet).

In the 2019 Japanese House of Councillors election, the party won four representatives in the National Diet, two in the lower house and two in the upper house. In November 2020, the party entered into a merger agreement with the Constitutional Democratic Party (CDP) with the SDP's members in the Diet caucusing with the CDP. The party president Mizuho Fukushima held her seat and, in the 2022 House of Councillors elections, the party cleared the minimum two percent voter share to maintain its legal political party status.

== History ==
=== Before 2000 ===
In 1995, the former Japan Socialist Party (JSP) was in a deep crisis, facing criticism for entering a coalition with its long-time rival, the LDP and for core policy changes. Aiming at saving the party, the leadership of JSP decided to dissolve the party and to establish a new social democratic party. In January 1996, a new party, the Social Democratic Party, was established, along with the dissolution of JSP. De jure, JSP changed its name to the Social Democratic Party (SDP) as an interim party for forming a new party, and a movement for transforming the SDP into a new social-democratic and liberal party was unsuccessful.

Under Murayama's successor Ryūtarō Hashimoto (LDP), the SDP remained part of the ruling coalition. Long before its disappointing result in the 1996 Japanese general election, the party lost the majority of its members of the House of Representatives, mainly to predecessors of the Democratic Party of Japan (DPJ) that was formed in 1996, but also some to the NFP and other opposition parties. After its electoral defeat in the 1996 general election, when it lost another 15 of its remaining 30 seats in the lower house, the SDP left the ruling coalition, which it had entered as the second-largest force in Japanese politics, as a minor party.

=== 2000s–2010s ===
The SDP won six seats in the 2003 Japanese general election, compared with 18 seats in the previous 2000 Japanese general election. The party's opposition to the Self-Defense Forces reverted to the abolition of the forces in the long term, the policy it had in the 1950s. Doi had been the leader since 1996, but she resigned in 2003, taking responsibility for the election losses. Mizuho Fukushima was elected as the new party leader in November 2003. In the 2004 Japanese House of Councillors election, the SDP won only two seats, having five seats in the House of Councillors and six seats in the House of Representatives. In 2006, the party unexpectedly gained the governorship of the Shiga Prefecture. In the 2009 Japanese general election, the DPJ made large gains and the SDP maintained its base of 7 seats in the, becoming a junior partner in a new government coalition; however, disagreements over the issue of the Futenma base led to the sacking of Fukushima from the cabinet on 28 May and the SDP subsequently voted to leave the ruling coalition.

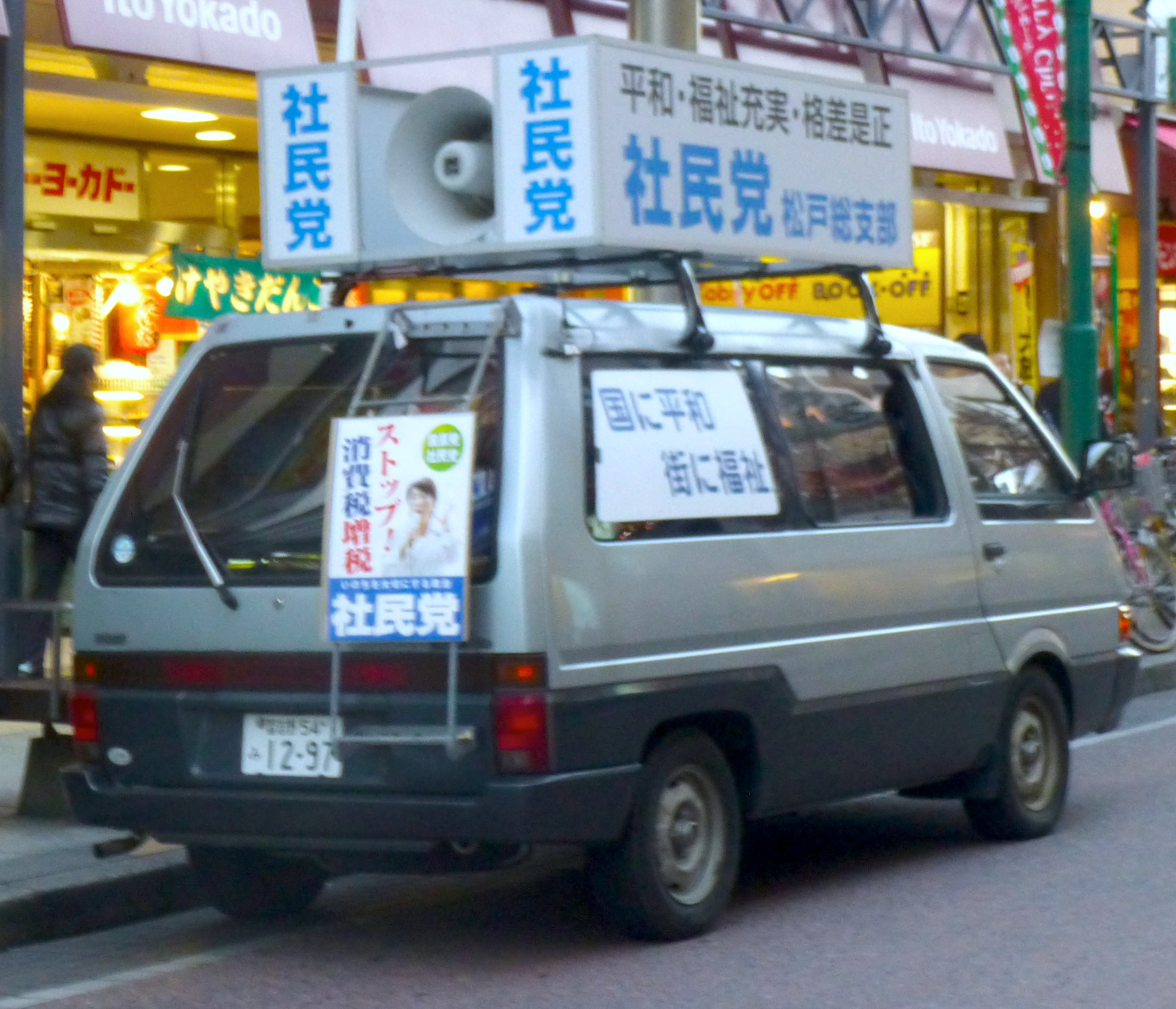
A SDP campaign van outside a station in December 2012

As of October 2010, the SDP had six members in the House of Representatives and four members in the House of Councillors. Following the 2012 Japanese general election, the party retained only six seats in the whole of the Diet, two in the House of Representatives and four in the House of Councillors. The count lowered to five seats in 2013. In 2013, the party's headquarters in Nagatacho, where the party's predecessor the JSP had moved in 1964, were demolished. The headquarters moved to a smaller office in Nagatacho.

During the nomination period of the 2016 Japanese House of Councillors election, the party signed an agreement with the Democratic, Communist and People's Life parties to field a jointly-endorsed candidate in each of the 32 districts in which only one seat is contested, thereby uniting in an attempt to take control of the House from the LDP/Komeito coalition. The party had two Councillors up for re-election and fielded a total of 11 candidates in the election, 4 in single and multi-member districts and 7 in the 48-seat national proportional representation block.

In the 2017 Japanese general election, the party managed to hold to its two seats it had prior to the election. Tadatomo Yoshida declined to run for re-election when his term expired in January 2018. Seiji Mataichi was elected unopposed in the ensuing leadership election and took office on 25 February 2018.

=== Since 2020 ===
On 14 November 2020, the party voted to agree to a merger arrangement with the Constitutional Democratic Party of Japan (CDP), allowing members to leave the SDP and join the latter party. The majority of the party supported the agreement and joined the CDP; however, party leader Fukushima herself was opposed to the merger agreement and remains a member of the Social Democratic Party.

In the 2021 Japanese general election, the party lost one of their two seats.

On 2 November 2025, Kunio Arakaki expressed his intention to quit the Social Democratic Party for a "different option and disagreements about expanding the party's influence". Arakaki finally quit the party on 19 November 2025, making the party lose all of its seats in the House of Representatives.

After the CDP and the Komeito formed the Centrist Reform Alliance in January 2026, the SDP objected to of the alliance's acceptance of the 2015 Legislation for Peace and Security. The SDP then withdrew from the CDP parliamentary faction to form its own.

In the 2026 Japanese general election, the party failed to win any seats for the first time since its founding. The 2026 party leadership election cycle began shortly after this loss with three candidates in the running. This marked the first time in about 13 years where an SDP leadership election featured multiple candidates. Party leader candidates included incumbent leader Mizuho Fukushima, former Senate member and previous Deputy Leader Yūko Ōtsubaki, and current Senate member and Deputy Leader LaSalle Ishii. The first round of ballots were counted on March 23 with Ishii eliminated from the running but no candidate winning an absolute majority. A runoff election was scheduled for April 4 and 5 with votes counted on April 6. Fukushima emerged as the winner of the runoff election.

== Ideology and policies ==
Ideologically, the SDP positions itself as a social democratic party, and is also described as a progressive, democratic socialist, and liberal. Furthermore, the party is pacifist and staunchly anti-militarist. While the party currently generally supports the U.S.–Japan Security Treaty, it continues to advocate for the defense of the Constitution of Japan, especially Article 9 which renounces war. During the time of Tomiichi Murayama, the JSP compromised with the LDP on the principles of disarmament, but after the 1998 elections, the SDP reverted to its former pacifist stance.

The party is considered a center-left, "left-leaning" to even left-wing within the political spectrum. The Japan Socialist Party, the predecessor of the SDP was the main left-wing party in postwar Japan, while the SDP moved politically towards the centre as a party for social-democrats and liberals. This moderation was comparable to the Godesberg Program of the Social Democratic Party of Germany, however the new image failed to gain public acceptance and had little impact.

Party policies include:

- Defending Article 9 of the Constitution of Japan and declare cities defenseless so that they will not resist in the event of invasion.
- Advocating a significant increase in the scope of social welfare such as healthcare, pensions, social security and disability care.
- Opposition to neoliberalism and neoconservatism.
- Complete disarmament of Japan in accordance with pacifist principles. The Japanese Self-Defense Force will be replaced with a force dedicated to disaster relief and foreign aid.
- Cancellation of the United States–Japan military alliance, dismantling of United States bases in Japan and replacing it with a Treaty of Friendship.
- Introduction of an environmental carbon tax.
- Significant increase in the scope of wildlife protection legislation, increasing the number of protected species and setting up of protection zones.
- Transition from a mass-production/mass-consumption society to a sustainable society in coexistence with nature.
- Clampdown on harmful chemicals, e.g. restriction on use of agricultural chemicals, ban on asbestos, tackling dioxin and soil pollutants.
- Increased investment in public transport, encouraging a switch from road to rail and from petrol powered buses to hybrids, electric vehicles and light rail transit.
- Opposition to nuclear power and proposal of a gradual switch to wind energy as the nation's base energy source.
- Abolition of the death penalty.
- Opposition to water privatization.
- Supports feminist politics.
- Legalization of same-sex marriage.

== Leaders ==
No.	Name (Birth–death)	Constituency / title	Term of office		Election results	Photo	Prime Minister (term)
No.	Name (Birth–death)	Constituency / title	Took office	Left office	Election results	Photo	Prime Minister (term)
Preceding party: Japan Socialist Party (left-wing)
Chair of the Social Democratic Party (1996–present)
1	Tomiichi Murayama (1924–2025)	Rep for Ōita 1st	19 January 1996	28 September 1996	-		Hashimoto 1996–98 (coalition, confidence and supply)
2	Takako Doi (1928–2014)	Rep for Hyōgō 7th	28 September 1996	15 November 2003	-		Hashimoto 1996–98 (coalition, confidence and supply)
2	Takako Doi (1928–2014)	Rep for Hyōgō 7th	28 September 1996	15 November 2003	-		Obuchi 1998–2000
2	Takako Doi (1928–2014)	Rep for Hyōgō 7th	28 September 1996	15 November 2003	-		Mori 2000–01
2	Takako Doi (1928–2014)	Rep for Hyōgō 7th	28 September 1996	15 November 2003	-		Koizumi 2001–06
3	Mizuho Fukushima (b. 1955)	Cou for National PR	15 November 2003	25 July 2013	-		Koizumi 2001–06
3	Mizuho Fukushima (b. 1955)	Cou for National PR	15 November 2003	25 July 2013	-		Abe S. 2006–07
3	Mizuho Fukushima (b. 1955)	Cou for National PR	15 November 2003	25 July 2013	-		Fukuda Y. 2007–08
3	Mizuho Fukushima (b. 1955)	Cou for National PR	15 November 2003	25 July 2013	-		Asō 2008–09
3	Mizuho Fukushima (b. 1955)	Cou for National PR	15 November 2003	25 July 2013	-		Hatoyama Y. 2009–10 (coalition until 30 May 2010)
3	Mizuho Fukushima (b. 1955)	Cou for National PR	15 November 2003	25 July 2013	-		Kan 2010–11
3	Mizuho Fukushima (b. 1955)	Cou for National PR	15 November 2003	25 July 2013	-		Noda 2011–12
3	Mizuho Fukushima (b. 1955)	Cou for National PR	15 November 2003	25 July 2013	-		Abe S. 2012–20
－	Seiji Mataichi (1944–2023) (acting)	Cou for National PR (until 28 July 2019)	25 July 2013	14 October 2013	-		Abe S. 2012–20
4	Tadatomo Yoshida (b. 1956)	Cou for National PR (until 25 July 2016) (29 July 2019 - present)	14 October 2013	25 February 2018	2013 Tadatomo Yoshida – 9,986; Taiga Ishikawa – 2,239 2016 Unopposed		Abe S. 2012–20
5	Seiji Mataichi (1944–2023)	Cou for National PR (until 28 July 2019)	25 February 2018	22 February 2020	2018 Unopposed		Abe S. 2012–20
6	Mizuho Fukushima (b. 1955)	Cou for National PR	22 February 2020	Incumbent	2020 Unopposed 2022 Unopposed 2023 Unopposed 2026 1st Round Mizuho Fukushima – 1,876; Yūko Ōtsubaki – 1,297; LaSalle Ishii – 967 2026 2nd Round Mizuho Fukushima – 2,364; Yūko Ōtsubaki – 1,792		Abe S. 2012–20
6	Mizuho Fukushima (b. 1955)	Cou for National PR	22 February 2020	Incumbent	2020 Unopposed 2022 Unopposed 2023 Unopposed 2026 1st Round Mizuho Fukushima – 1,876; Yūko Ōtsubaki – 1,297; LaSalle Ishii – 967 2026 2nd Round Mizuho Fukushima – 2,364; Yūko Ōtsubaki – 1,792		Suga 2020–21
6	Mizuho Fukushima (b. 1955)	Cou for National PR	22 February 2020	Incumbent	2020 Unopposed 2022 Unopposed 2023 Unopposed 2026 1st Round Mizuho Fukushima – 1,876; Yūko Ōtsubaki – 1,297; LaSalle Ishii – 967 2026 2nd Round Mizuho Fukushima – 2,364; Yūko Ōtsubaki – 1,792		Kishida 2021–24
6	Mizuho Fukushima (b. 1955)	Cou for National PR	22 February 2020	Incumbent	2020 Unopposed 2022 Unopposed 2023 Unopposed 2026 1st Round Mizuho Fukushima – 1,876; Yūko Ōtsubaki – 1,297; LaSalle Ishii – 967 2026 2nd Round Mizuho Fukushima – 2,364; Yūko Ōtsubaki – 1,792		Ishiba 2024–25
6	Mizuho Fukushima (b. 1955)	Cou for National PR	22 February 2020	Incumbent	2020 Unopposed 2022 Unopposed 2023 Unopposed 2026 1st Round Mizuho Fukushima – 1,876; Yūko Ōtsubaki – 1,297; LaSalle Ishii – 967 2026 2nd Round Mizuho Fukushima – 2,364; Yūko Ōtsubaki – 1,792		Takaichi 2025–present

== Election results ==
=== House of Representatives ===
House of Representatives
Election	Leader	Seats			Position	Constituency votes		PR Block votes		Status
Election	Leader	No.	±	Share	Position	No.	Share	No.	Share	Status
1996	Takako Doi	15 / 500	▲15	3.0%	5th	1,240,649	2.19%	3,547,240	6.38%	LDP-SDP-NPS coalition
1996	Takako Doi	15 / 500	▲15	3.0%	5th	1,240,649	2.19%	3,547,240	6.38%	Opposition
2000	Takako Doi	19 / 480	▲4	4.0%	▼6th	2,315,235	3.80%	5,603,680	9.36%	Opposition
2003	Takako Doi	6 / 480	▼13	1.3%	▲5th	1,708,672	2.87%	3,027,390	5.12%	Opposition
2005	Mizuho Fukushima	7 / 480	▲1	1.5%	5th	996,008	1.5%	3,719,522	5.49%	Opposition
2009	Mizuho Fukushima	7 / 480	Steady	1.5%	5th	1,376,739	1.95%	3,006,160	4.27%	DPJ-SDP-PNP coalition
2009	Mizuho Fukushima	7 / 480	Steady	1.5%	5th	1,376,739	1.95%	3,006,160	4.27%	Opposition
2012	Mizuho Fukushima	2 / 480	▼5	0.4%	▼8th	451,762	0.76%	1,420,790	2.36%	Opposition
2014	Tadatomo Yoshida	2 / 475	Steady	0.4%	▲6th	419,347	0.79%	1,314,441	2.46%	Opposition
2017	Tadatomo Yoshida	2 / 465	Steady	0.4%	▼7th	634,770	1.15%	941,324	1.69%	Opposition
2021	Mizuho Fukushima	1 / 465	▼1	0.2%	8th	313,193	0.55%	1,018,588	1.77%	Opposition
2024	Mizuho Fukushima	1 / 465	Steady	0.2%	▼10th	283,287	0.52%	934,598	1.71%	Opposition
2026	Mizuho Fukushima	0 / 465	▼1	0.0%	▼11th	148,666	0.26%	728,602	1.27%	Extra-parliamentary

=== Senate ===
Senate
Election	Leader	No. of seats total	No. of seats won	No. of National votes	% of National vote	No. of Prefectural votes	% of Prefectural vote
1998	Takako Doi	13 / 252	5 / 126	4,370,763	7.8%	2,403,649	4.3%
2001	Takako Doi	8 / 247	3 / 121	3,628,635	6.63%	1,874,299	3.45%
2004	Mizuho Fukushima	5 / 242	2 / 121	2,990,665	5.35%	984,338	1.75%
2007	Mizuho Fukushima	5 / 242	2 / 121	2,634,713	4.47%	1,352,018	2.28%
2010	Mizuho Fukushima	4 / 242	2 / 121	2,242,735	3.84%	602,684	1.03%
2013	Mizuho Fukushima	3 / 242	1 / 121	1,255,235	2.36%	271,547	0.51%
2016	Tadatomo Yoshida	2 / 242	1 / 121	1,536,238	2.74%	289,899	0.51%
2019	Seiji Mataichi	2 / 245	1 / 124	1,046,011	2.09%	191,820	0.38%
2022	Mizuho Fukushima	1 / 248	1 / 125	1,258,502	2.37%	178,911	0.34%
2025	Mizuho Fukushima	2 / 248	1 / 125	1,217,823	2.06%	302,775	0.51%

== Current Diet members ==
=== House of Councillors ===
Up for re-election in 2031

- LaSalle Ishii (National PR)

Up for re-election in 2028

- Mizuho Fukushima (National PR)

== See also ==
- Democratic Party of Japan
- Democratic Socialist Party (Japan)
- Japan Socialist Party
- Leftist Socialist Party of Japan
- List of political parties in Japan
- Politics of Japan
- Rightist Socialist Party of Japan
- Itsurō Sakisaka
