= Seiji Mataichi =

Japanese politician (1944–2023)

- 又市 征治
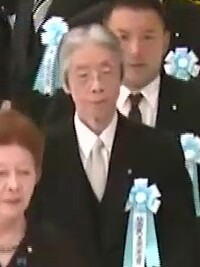
- 2016

Chairman of the Social Democratic Party
- In office 25 February 2018 – 22 February 2020
- Preceded by: Tadatomo Yoshida
- Succeeded by: Mizuho Fukushima
- In office 25 July 2013 – 14 October 2013
- Preceded by: Mizuho Fukushima
- Succeeded by: Tadatomo Yoshida

Member of the House of Councillors
- In office 29 July 2001 – 28 July 2019
- Constituency: National PR

Personal details
- Born: 18 July 1944 Toyama City, Toyama, Japan
- Died: 18 September 2023 (aged 79) Toyama City, Toyama, Japan
- Party: Social Democratic
- Website: Official website

Seiji Mataichi (又市 征治, Mataichi Seiji; 18 July 1944 – 18 September 2023) was a Japanese politician who served as a member of the House of Councillors. He was also the Chairman of the Social Democratic Party. Mataichi died on 18 September 2023, at the age of 79.

Party political offices
Preceded by Tadatomo Yoshida	Leader of the Social Democratic Party; 25 February 2018 – 22 February 2020	Succeeded by Mizuho Fukushima
Preceded by Mizuho Fukushima	Leader of the Social Democratic Party (Acting); 25 July 2013 – 14 October 2013	Succeeded by Tadatomo Yoshida
