= Shinya Adachi =

Japanese politician

- 足立 信也
- Official portrait, 2009

Mayor of Ōita
- Incumbent
- Assumed office 24 April 2023
- Preceded by: Kiichiro Sato

Member of House of Councillors
- In office 26 July 2004 – 25 July 2022
- Preceded by: Toshiya Nakamichi
- Succeeded by: Harutomo Kosho
- Constituency: Ōita at-large

Personal details
- Born: Adachi Shin'ya; 5 June 1957 (age 69) Ōita City, Ōita, Japan
- Party: Independent (since 2022)
- Other political affiliations: DPJ (2004–2016); DP (2016–2018); DPP (2018–2022)
- Education: University of Tsukuba
- Website: 足立信也ホームページ

Shinya Adachi (足立 信也, Adachi Shin'ya; born 5 June 1957) is a Japanese politician of the Democratic Party for the People, and a former member of the House of Councillors in the Diet (national legislature).

== Career ==
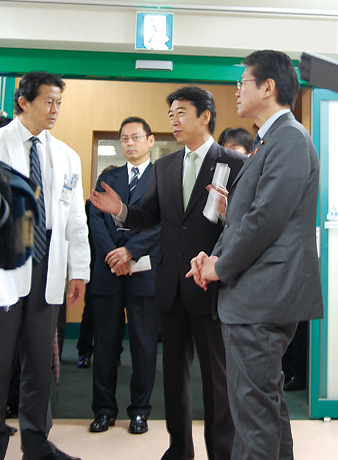
Shinya Adachi with Akira Nagatsuma on 3 December 2009

A native of Ōita, Ōita, he attended University of Tsukuba and received a Ph.D. in medicine from it. He was elected for the first time in 2004. He served until 2022, and in 2023 he became the mayor of Ōita city.
