= List of KochiKame characters =

The KochiKame: Tokyo Beat Cops (KochiKame) manga series features an extensive cast of characters created by Osamu Akimoto.

== The Police Box ==
Kankichi Ryotsu (両津 勘吉, Ryōtsu Kankichi)

Voiced by: LaSalle Ishii (1996 anime), Kenji Utsumi ('85 Jump Festival Anime), Fukushi Ochiai (2027 anime)
Portrayed by: Shingo Katori
Born March 3. The Head Patrol Officer of Katsushika, stationed at the police box in front of Kameari Park. Hails from Asakusa, Taitō, Tokyo. "Ryo-san" is a 36-year-old middle-aged police officer with the personality of a teenager. His laziness at work is matched only by his greediness and cleverness in hatching money-making schemes, the fruits of which are invariably squandered on toys, gadgets, and cheap entertainment. He is the stereotypical street-smart "shitamachi" type: sporting a crew cut, stomping about in ratty sandals (even in uniform), and being narrow-minded toward the outside world, as he makes his rounds on a creaky old bicycle. At the same time, he is a super-otaku, up on all the latest fads in popular culture and consumer technology. While most of his interests are juvenile (such as videogames and collectibles), he also indulges in more typically salaryman-type pastimes such as drinking, pachinko, and gambling (especially horse-racing). Despite his undisciplined lifestyle, he possesses superhuman strength and stamina, which he is forced to depend on at times. Ryotsu is a bachelor and seems relatively uninterested in women, yet occasionally attracts the attention of naïve young female acquaintances, though never with any eventual success. He travels to Hashutsujo by his bicycle named Chidori. He has a younger brother named Kinjiro who wears glasses and runs a successful law firm.

Keiichi Nakagawa (中川 圭一, Nakagawa Keiichi)

Voiced by: Mitsuru Miyamoto (1996 anime), Akira Kamiya ('85 Jump Festival Anime), Shouta Aoi (2027 anime)
Portrayed by: Mokomichi Hayami
Born December 24. A young, handsome patrol cop who serves as Ryo's comic foil as he is benevolent while also rich. While holding down a day job in the police box in front of Kameari Park, Nakagawa is the son of Nakagawa Zaibatsu and often has to zip off to board meetings in his exotic sports cars and private helicopters. He is quite handsome, an expert driver and marksman, and popular with all the lady cops. However, as a rich heir, he is quite naive to the ways of the world. His policeman's uniform is an ¥300,000 yellow pinstripe suit made by Pierre Cardin. Though constantly surrounded by beautiful women throughout his duties, Nakagawa appears indifferent and his tendencies are somewhat ambiguous. He hates natto, and his favorite car is his Ferrari. He has a younger sister who is also as busy as his parents.

Reiko Katherine Akimoto (秋本･カトリーヌ･麗子, Akimoto Katorīnu Reiko)

Voiced by: Yumi Morio (1996 anime), Mika Doi ('85 Jump Festival Anime), M.A.O (2027 anime)
Portrayed by: Karina Nose
Born July 7. A female counterpart to Nakagawa, Reiko's wealth is inherited from European nobility and she juggles her commitments to the police job with those of high society. The daughter of the Kobe-based Akimoto Trading Zaibatsu, Reiko is half French, was raised in France, and is multilingual. With her flowing blonde hair and stunningly cute pink police uniform she looks like an angel. She is fast for a woman of such built. Reiko is often courted by rich and famous men but has never found the right man. She works in the transportation department and drives a Porsche. She has one younger sister named Yu Akimoto.

Daijiro Ohara (大原 大次郎, Ōhara Daijirō)

Voiced by: Kouji Hishiya (1996 anime, eps. 1–19), Haruki Sayama (1996 anime, eps. 20+), Kouichi Kitamura ('85 Jump Festival Anime), Raikō Sakamoto (2027 anime)
Portrayed by: Masatō Ibu
The Chief Patrol Officer of Katsushika, in charge of the police box in front of Kameari Park. He usually called "Buchō" or "Division Head" (部長) and is Ryotsu's boss. He is a typical grizzled middle-management senior cop. Sporting a small trimmed mustache, akin to Hitler, Bucho is often out of touch or exasperated with his younger staff, but he always ready to punish Ryo-san for his laziness (Despite this, he shows kindness to Ryotsu occasionally, treating him as the son he never had). He is a fatherlike figure for Ryoutsu, Reiko, and Nakagawa. His many hobbies include judo, kendo, sado, bonsai, and calligraphy. He comes to Hashutsujho by bus and train. He is married with one daughter named Hiromi and is grandfather to her two children.

Ai Asato (麻里 愛, Asato Ai)

Voiced by: Kaori Asoh (1996 anime)
Reiko’s occasional partner on the force, whose nickname is Maria (マリア), an ateji reading of her full name's kanji. She is the most important female character after Reiko in the anime. Like Reiko, Maria is tall, beautiful, and buxom. Unlike Reiko, Maria is a brunette and a transgender woman. Maria, along with Reiko, are portrayed as being the main beauties of the Kochikame storyline. She is always known and seen in her violet police uniform she always wears to work. She is in love with Ryotsu due to his resemblance to her former martial arts teacher and becomes jealous whenever another girl comes near him. Initially Ryotsu wanted to marry Maria desperately but started to like her more like a female best friend after knowing her past. Since Maria is a pre-op trans woman or Kathoey, she is occasionally told by Ryotsu that she is a man. She was a Muay Thai (kickboxing) champion and generally excels at all martial arts. In the manga, she became a biological female after a magical incident, while she underwent hormone replacement therapy and breast augmentation surgery in the anime. She is yet to undergo sex-reassignment surgery like the real TS kickboxing champion Parinya Kiatbusaba. It is revealed that she and her twin sister Rin were being born from Kyoko Asato, their mother who gave birth to these two at the age of sixteen when she met Ban.

Hayato Honda (本田 速人, Honda Hayato)

Voiced by: Hiroshi Yanaka (1996 anime)
Portrayed by: Teruyoshi Uchimura
The station's motorcycle policeman, and Ryotsu's underling, often reluctantly dragged into his schemes. A shy young man who still sports a pompadour from his teenage motorcycle gang days, he immediately turns into an aggressive man with a deeper voice and a very intimidating face when he mounts a motorcycle. No motor gangster is a match against him, as he still thinks like one. He is also an otaku who loves shōjo manga and Japanese idols. Honda's father runs a garage specializing in Kawasaki cycles named Honda Ringyo. His humble-aggressive personality switch runs in the family, as his father with his coveralls, his younger brother with bicycles, and his younger sister with elephants.

Yangukan Marui (丸井 ヤング館, Marui Yangukan)

Voiced by: Chafurin (1996 anime, eps. 1~97), Kobuhei Hayashiya (1996 anime, eps. 98~)
A plump cop stationed at the police box. He wants to live his life as an "ordinary policeman" but is rather poor and unintelligent, though sensible. He has two sons. Every attempt he makes to buy a house or car ends with tragic results. He is usually seen with Buchō and wears glasses. Originally known as Yōichi Terai (寺井 洋一, Terai Yōichi), he was renamed to his current name in 2009. However, since he was renamed, he had gotten many fortunes. His birthplace is Hokkaido.

Neruo Higurashi (日暮熟睡男, Higurashi Neruo)

Voiced by: Shigeru Ushiyama (1996 anime, ep. 7~125), Atsushi Imai (1996 anime ep. 126~)
Portrayed by: Kankurō Kudō
A police officer who only works one day every four years (coinciding with the Olympics) and does nothing but sleep even then. He is able to keep his job because his precognition and nensha abilities come in handy during investigations. If he is awakened before the scheduled time, he will go on an angry rampage and cause destruction everywhere, and only the pleading from a beautiful girl can calm him down.

Kinji Totsuka (戸塚金次, Totsuka Kinji)

Voiced by: Eiji Takemoto
Ryotsu's fellow patrol officer who often joined him in goofing off during the early years of the series. Though a police officer, he looks more like a yakuza, sporting tattoos on his back and a scar over his right eye. He has been playing mahjong for over 20 years and even remembers playing it as a child. Though once a prominent character, he appears very rarely these days, but he did appear in 2004 and 2006. He has a tattoo on his back.

Komachi Ono (小野小町, Ono Komachi) & Naoko Seishō (清正奈緒子, Seishō Naoko)

Voiced by: Kanako Mitsuhashi) (Komachi, 1996 anime, ep. 1-6), Maya Okamoto (1996 anime, eps. 8~90), ((Rieko Miura (1996 anime, eps. 93~)))
Voiced by: Maya Okamoto (Naoko, 1996 anime, ep. 1-6), (Kanako Mitsuhashi（1996 anime, eps. 8~)))
Two female police officers who work on the traffic department. Both of them love to tease and ridicule Ryotsu, though not out of hate. Their relationship with Ryotsu is a love/hate relation, similar to siblings, and both of them know that if they ever get into trouble, they can always count on Ryotsu (even though he sometimes demands a favor in return). Ono is Naoko's senpai. A (behind the scenes) misunderstanding led to them accidentally having each other's voice actress in the first episode. They only appear in the anime series and are absent in the manga.

== Other Katsushika Station Officers ==
Gomesu Tonda (屯田五目須, Tonda Gomesu)

- Voiced by: Eimei Esumi→Jin Nishimura

Head of the new Katsushika station. A rather kind and gentle man, he met and eloped with his wife during his patrol officer days. He has three children and six grandchildren whom he spends his days off babysitting. His estimated age is 58.

Matoi Giboshi (擬宝珠纏, Giboshi Matoi)

Voiced by: Yūko Doi (1996 anime)
A newly arrived traffic division officer who joined the ranks at age 19, right after graduating from high school. She was born in Kanda, Tokyo and is an efficient Edokko. Her shitamachi knowledge is almost on par with Ryo-san. She is a bit of a tomboy and is fearsome in a quarrel. A self-taught martial arts expert, she is also an amazing baseball player, capable of throwing a fastball at 150 km/h (approximately 93 mph). Her family runs the high-class restaurant Chō Kanda Sushi (超神田寿司, Cho Kanda Sushi). She (with her family) is the most important recent addition in the story.
She was engaged to Ryotsu after he started working in Super Kanda Sushi, but it was called off when they realized that they were cousins as well as learning his greedy nature. However, they continued to live and work together and even slept together sometimes (when she was drunk and strangled Ryotsu). In the manga, many chapters prove she and Ryotsu like each other. She usually matches and bests Ryotsu in everything he is good at (except for more negative things like gambling and drinking etc.). Despite her appearance, she is well-versed in many traditional Japanese arts, such as dancing and music, and once dressed up as a geisha – completely fooling both Ryotsu and her brother. Usually her street clothes involve jeans and T-shirts with no makeup and very little accessories.

Haya Isowashi (磯鷲早矢, Isowashi Haya)

Works in the traffic division. She is the eldest daughter of a distinguished Bushido house in Kyoto and is well-versed in all such arts. She is attractive and very honest. She is popular with the other policewomen and greatly admires Buchō. Because his voice resembles her father's, she has fallen for Ryotsu and is very jealous of Maria. In addition, her name is a kyūdō term. Haya is 21 years old. In later chapters, she displayed the ability to see ghosts and even into the future. She usually goes on patrol with Matoi, who is her main sparring partner (since she is generally the only female office who can stand up to her in martial arts). She is present in the manga but absent in the anime.

Nana Otohime (乙姫菜々, Otohime Nana)

Voiced by: Masami Suzuki (1996 anime)
Honda's fellow motorcycle cop underling and later girlfriend. She is a delicate young lady and a bit of a crybaby. She has a side job as popular shōjo manga author Miko Aino (愛野神女, Aino Miko).

Volvo Saigo (ボルボ西郷, Borubo Saigō)

Voiced by: Yuuji Kishi (1996 series)
A policeman who works for the new Katsushika station. He used to be a mercenary in America. He conceals weapons of all kinds in his body and does not remove them during bathing or sleep. He has the habit of firing indiscriminately when danger is sensed. He is unaccustomed to women (as he will nosebleed on the sight of them) and surprisingly cowardly without his guns. His ancestors in Kyūshū were ninja.

Tatsunosuke Sakonji (左近寺竜之介, Sakonji Tatsunosuke)

Voiced by: Masami Iwasaki (1996 series)
A police officer who works at the new Katsushika station. He is excellent at all combat sports, especially, judo. He tries to appear to have no interest in women but has displays a very unhealthy obsession with a fictional female video game character named Saori (さおり).

Rika Saotome (早乙女リカ, Saotome Rika)

Voiced by: Yuu Sugimoto (1996 series)
One of the many young policewomen of the district and Ryotsu's arch-enemy. Saotome thinks Ryotsu is a disgusting, rude, hooligan. Ryotsu thinks Saotome and her colleagues are pampered weaklings and a waste of the force's budget. Saotome and her fellow bachelorettes live in a luxury dormitory resembling a French chateau.

Masayoshi Hōjō (法条正義, Hōjō Masayoshi)

Voiced by: Daisuke Fukagai (1996 series)
An elite police officer and graduate from Tokyo University. He is cool and intelligent but, because his face looks more like that of a yakuza thug, he carries his diploma around as proof that he is as smart as he says he is. His specialty is debate; he still always loses when it comes to looks.

Jūzō Gorugo (後流悟十三, Gorugo Jūzō)

Tetsuo Ishizu (石頭鉄岩, Ishizu Tetsuo)

Voiced by: Tōta Tawaragi (1996 series)

The "traffic safety" instructor for the division. He usually goes way overboard in his training and safety regulation, which basically involve that cars drive slower than walking pace, as well as giving ridiculous nicknames (all associated with traffic regulation) to his colleagues.

Ebichan Ebisu (恵比須海老茶, Ebisu Ebichan)

Voiced by: Katashi Ishizuka (1996 series)
A frequently appearing cop (though not quite as much in recent years) who laughs at anything and everything.

== Other recurring characters ==
Haru Mido (御堂春, Midō Haru)

She works in the Osaka Prefectural Police traffic division. She is unyielding. She is short but is allowed the job because of her ability to make arrests. She has a bronze medal for Olympic shooting. She is 20 years old. She has six younger brothers and her family runs a kushikatsu shop. She views Ryotsu as her "Enemy from Tokyo," but she is a fan of Nakagawa and humbles herself in his presence. She only appears in the manga and is absent in the anime.

Jodie Bakuryū-Karen (ジョディー·爆竜·カレン)

- Voiced by: Rei Saitō

A soldier in the United States Navy and Volvo's girlfriend. She is a pilot on the aircraft carrier Carl Vinson. She is blonde, beautiful and poison in the eyes of Volvo who is weak around women. She is said to be strong enough to defeat 10 Marine Corps soldiers in a row. Hoping to open up a sushi bar on her aircraft carrier, she received training as a sushi chef for a month at Chō Kanda Sushi.

Korosuke Ezaki (絵崎コロ助, Ezaki Korosuke)

- Voiced by: Takashi Matsuyama

Rika Hanayama (花山理香, Hanayama Rika)

- Voiced by: Akira Sakamoto

Tōden Hoshi (星逃田, Hoshi Tōden)

- Voiced by: Shirō Shimomoto

== Chou Kanda Sushi ==
Geparuto Giboshi (擬宝珠夏春都, Giboshi Geparuto)

- Voiced by: Takayasu Komiya

Ryo-san's grand-aunt (the younger sister of Kanbei, Ryotsu's grandfather) and Matoi's grandmother. She is the hostess of Chō Kanda Sushi. She is a stubborn and obstinate woman with a frightening memory, but she is very warm by nature. Since Ryo-san taught her how to use a computer, she has begun using all sorts of high tech gadgets. She disapproves of Ryo-san and is always trying to keep her granddaughters Matoi and Lemon from falling in love with him, especially Matoi. She is over 100 years old but still perfectly healthy – one of the very few characters who consistently gets the best of Ryo-san!

Lemon Giboshi (擬宝珠檸檬, Giboshi Remon)

- Voiced by: Ayaka Saito

The younger sister of Matoi. Kindergartener. She is a true child genius who likes historical things such as Mito Kōmon, shogi, ojarumaru and often speak like an elder person (but has a childish and naive side occasionally as well). She has an incredible sense of taste: She is already the primary food taster for Chou Kanda Sushi and is often relied on by local and often famous national traditional restaurants to taste food. She is unyielding, like her elder sister Matoi. She is 4-5 years old. Her birthday is on December 11. She originally hated toast but later grew to like it. Ryotsu treat her a lot like his child and is extremely protective of her, though often she acts as his teacher in things like chess and calligraphy (much to Ryotsu's embarrassment to learn from a 5-year-old). She rides to her kindergarten in a Jaguar.

Mikan Giboshi (擬宝珠蜜柑, Giboshi Mikan)

- Voiced by: Mika Sakenobe

The newborn sister of the Giboshi family.

Yuutsu Giboshi (擬宝珠憂鬱, Giboshi Yuutsu)

The eldest son of the family. He is a tall, handsome youth who is the main chef at a famous Kyoto restaurant and an almost-professional-level baseball player, as well as a railfan. The main flaw of this seemingly perfect person is that he is rather obsessed with himself and thinks that any beautiful young woman who looks him in the eye is in love with him. He is hard on himself for letting Matoi have a tomboy-like personality (because he started teaching her baseball) and always cries when he starts drinking.

== Special Detective Squad ==
Detective Speedy (海パン刑事, Kaipan-Deka)

- Voiced by: Ryō Arakawa

Real name Takeshi Kitano (汚野たけし, Kitano Takeshi). The leader of the Special Detective Squad (特殊刑事課, Tokushu Keiji-ka), he is always seen wearing just a Speedo and neck tie (with the neck tie appearing to be the source of his "powers"). He often pulls items such as cell phones and bananas from his Speedo. His codename is short for Kaisui-pantsu (海水パンツ, swim trunks), while his real name comes from comedian Beat Takeshi.

Detective Moonlight (月光刑事, Gekkō-deka)

- Voiced by: Bunmei Tobayama

Real name Mun Seira (聖羅無々, Seira Mun) (a pun on the titular Sailor Moon).

Detective Venus (美茄子刑事, Bīnasu-deka)

- Voiced by: Manta Yamamoto

Real name Bīnaus Seira (聖羅美茄子, Seira Bīnasu) (a pun on the name Sailor Venus, another character from Sailor Moon).

Detective Dolphin (ドルフィン刑事, Dorufin-deka)

- Voiced by: Shōichirō Akaboshi

Real name Dozaemon Umino (海野土佐ェ門, Umino Dozaemon).

Detective Bishōjo (美少女刑事, Bishōjo-deka)

Voiced by: Yōichi Kohiyama
Real name Rurika Asato (麻生瑠璃華, Asato Rurika).

== Notable family members ==
Kanbei Ryotsu (両津 勘兵衛, Ryōtsu Kanbee)

- Voiced by: Kōichi Kitamura

Ryotsu's grandfather who is 100. He used to live in Tsukudanijima, but he made the venture company named Ryotsu Game Company (RGC) with his friends and earns much money. His hobby is playing tennis.

Ban Asato (麻里晩, Asato Ban)

- Voiced by: Tadashi Miyazawa

Maria and Rin's father and Kyoko's wife. He is well known for his mustache and his toilet-seat-like hairdo. He runs a martial arts school that he hopes to pass on to his children, but they refuse because the martial arts techniques are nothing but childish pranks. He met Kyoko when she was sixteen years old which results in the birth of the Asato twins.

Rin Asato (麻里稟, Asato Rin)

- Voiced by: Kaori Asoh

Maria's younger twin sister who looks exactly like her brother. The main difference between them is that she is more aggressive than Maria. She is a successful martial arts actress in the film industry in Hong Kong and, like her brother, shows no interest in inheriting the family's martial arts business.

Onitora Bakuryū (爆竜鬼虎, Bakuryū Onitora)

- Voiced by: Tetsuo Komura

Jodie's father. As a colonel in the United States Army, he fought a lot of wars, so he has a lot of scratches. He is constantly hoping for his daughter to find the perfect husband.

Kōme Hanayama (花山小梅, Hanayama Kōme)

- Voiced by: Harumi Ikoma

Yone Ryotsu (両津よね, Ryotsu Yone)

- Rie Shibata(Live action TV series), Shizuka Okohira
  - She is Ryoutsu's mother. She was born in Shibamata. Her younger brother runs the Side Dish shop in Shibamata.

Ginji Ryotsu (両津銀次, Ryotsu Ginji)

- LaSalle Ishii(Live action TV series), Tetsu Watanabe
  - He is Ryoutsu's father. He runs the Tsukudani shop named Yorozuya in Asakusa. He loves gambles and watching adult videos. He has a dragon-eyes tattoo on his back.
