= LaSalle Ishii =

Japanese voice actor and politician

- ラサール石井
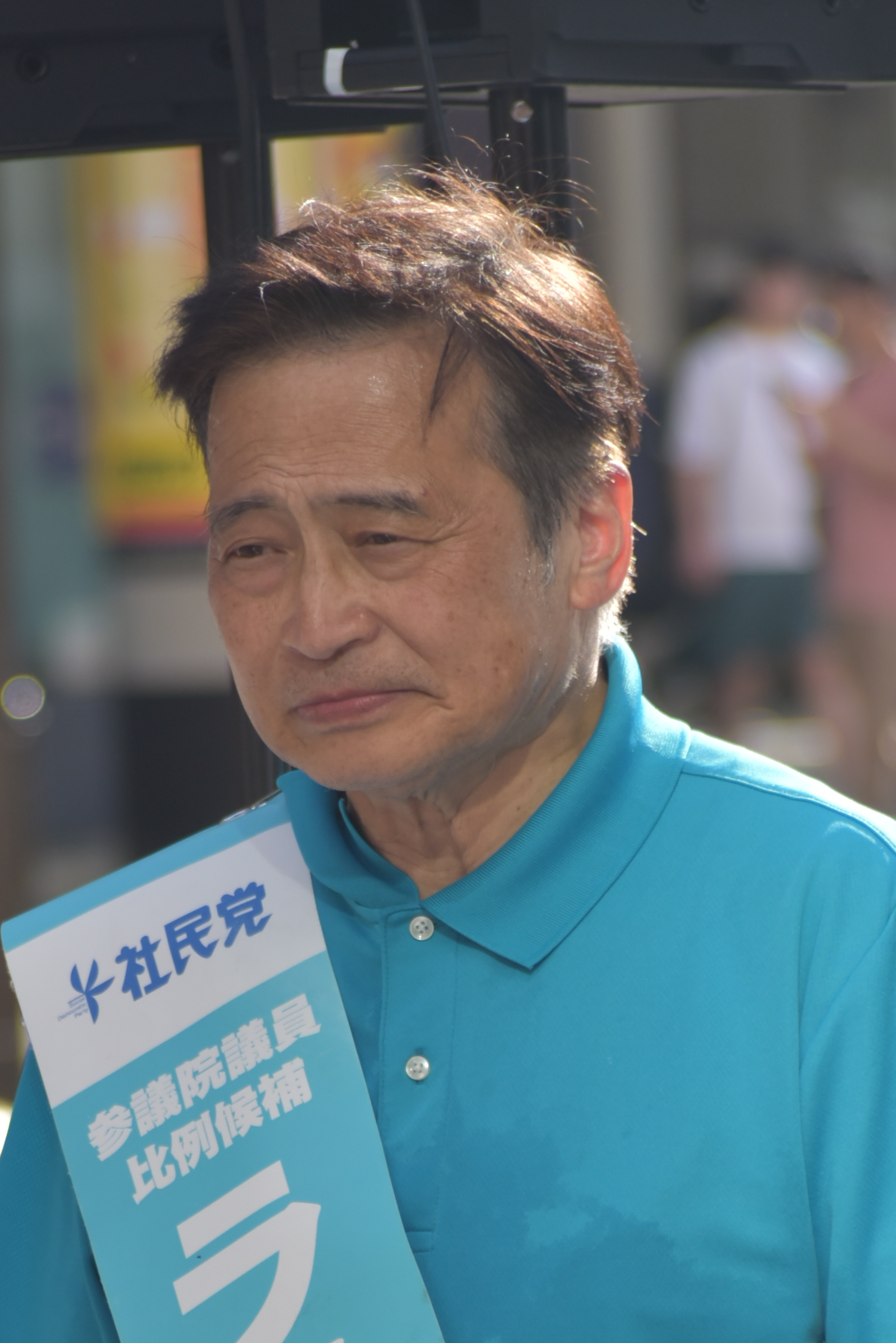
- LaSalle Ishii in 2025

Member of the House of Councillors
- Incumbent
- Assumed office July 29, 2025
- Constituency: National PR

Personal details
- Born: Akio Ishii; October 19, 1955 (age 70) Sumiyoshi, Osaka, Japan
- Party: Social Democratic
- Education: Japanese La Salle Academy; Waseda University
- Occupation: Comedian, Actor, Talk show host, Politician

Akio Ishii (Japanese: 石井朗夫, Hepburn: Ishii Akio; born October 19, 1955), known professionally as LaSalle Ishii (ラサール石井, Rasāru Ishii), is a Japanese TV personality, actor, director, writer, columnist, and politician. He named himself after his high school Japanese La Salle Academy. His best-known anime role is Kankichi Ryotsu the lead character in Kochira Katsushika-ku Kameari Kōen-mae Hashutsujo which ran from 1999 to 2004 for 373 episodes.

In 2025, he ran in the House of Councillors election in the proportional representation district as a member of the Social Democratic Party, winning a seat.

On September 24 the same year, the managerial committee of SDP announced it approved his inauguration as its Vice-Chairman.

== Filmography ==
=== TV programs ===
- Ore-tachi Hyokin Zoku (1981–1989, Fuji Television)
- Quiz!! Hirameki Password (1986–1990, Mainichi Broadcasting System, TBS)
- JanJan Saturday (1987–1990, Shizuoka Daiichi Television)
- Takeshi Itsumi no Heisei Kyoiku Iinkai (1991–1997, Fuji Television)
- Mokugeki! Dokyun (1994–2002, TV Asahi)
- Burari Tochu Gesha no Tabi (1994, Nippon Television)
- Watch! (2004–2005, TBS)
- Evening 5 (2005–2006, TBS)

=== TV drama ===
- Yoni mo Kimyo na Monogatari (1991, Fuji Television)
- Teru Teru Kazoku (2003, NHK)
- Kochira Katsushika-ku Kameari Kōen-mae Hashutsujo (2009, TBS), Ginji Ryotsu

=== Anime television series ===
- Kochira Katsushika-ku Kameari Kōen-mae Hashutsujo, Kankichi Ryotsu
- Gintama (Mayuzon (Special guest appearance))
- G-Saviour (Gano)

=== Video games ===
- Rasāru Ishii no Childs Quest (Nintendo Family Computer, Namco) June 23, 1989
- LaSalle Ishii no Quiz! Kyōiku Iinkai (Mega Drive, unknown publisher) 1994; exclusive to Sega Channel in Japan

=== Films ===
- Baby Elephant Story: The Angel Who Descended to Earth (1986), Genji Oshima
- Romance (1992)
- Godzilla vs. Mechagodzilla II (1993), oil research employee
- Gamera 2: Attack of Legion (1996), Nazaki transmission staff member
- About Her Brother (2010)
- Wiseguy (2020)
- The Devil Wears Jūnihitoe (2020)
- We Couldn't Become Adults (2021)

=== Theater ===
- Kochira Katsushika-ku Kameari Kōen-mae Hashutsujo (1999) Kankichi Ryotsu
- Kochira Katsushika-ku Kameari Kōen-mae Hashutsujo Again (2001) Kankichi Ryotsu
- Seven Souls in the Skull Castle (2004) Mamiana Jirouemon
- Kochira Katsushika-ku Kameari Kōen-mae Hashutsujo: Detective Kaipan Strikes Back (2003) Kankichi Ryotsu
- Kochira Katsushika-ku Kameari Kōen-mae Hashutsujo 30th Anniversary! (2006) Kankichi Ryotsu
