= Kiyoshi Adachi (politician) =

Japanese politician

- 安達 澄
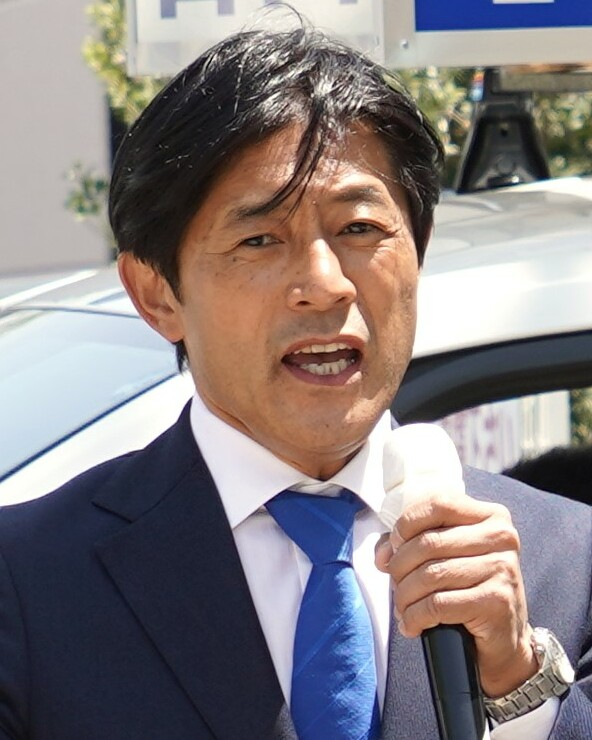
- Adachi in 2023

Member of House of Councillors
- In office 29 July 2019 – 10 March 2023
- Preceded by: Yōsuke Isozaki
- Succeeded by: Aki Shirasaka
- Constituency: Ōita at-large

Personal details
- Born: 14 December 1969 (age 56) Beppu, Ōita, Japan
- Party: Independent
- Education: Sophia University
- Website: 安達澄

Kiyoshi Adachi (born December 14, 1969, in Ōita Prefecture, Japan) is a Japanese politician who served as a member of the House of Councillors of Japan from 2019 until his resignation in 2023 to run for Governor of Ōita Prefecture. He represented the Ōita at-large district as an independent.

He was a member of the Committee on Financial Affairs.
