= Mizuho Fukushima =

Japanese politician (born 1955)

- 福島 瑞穂
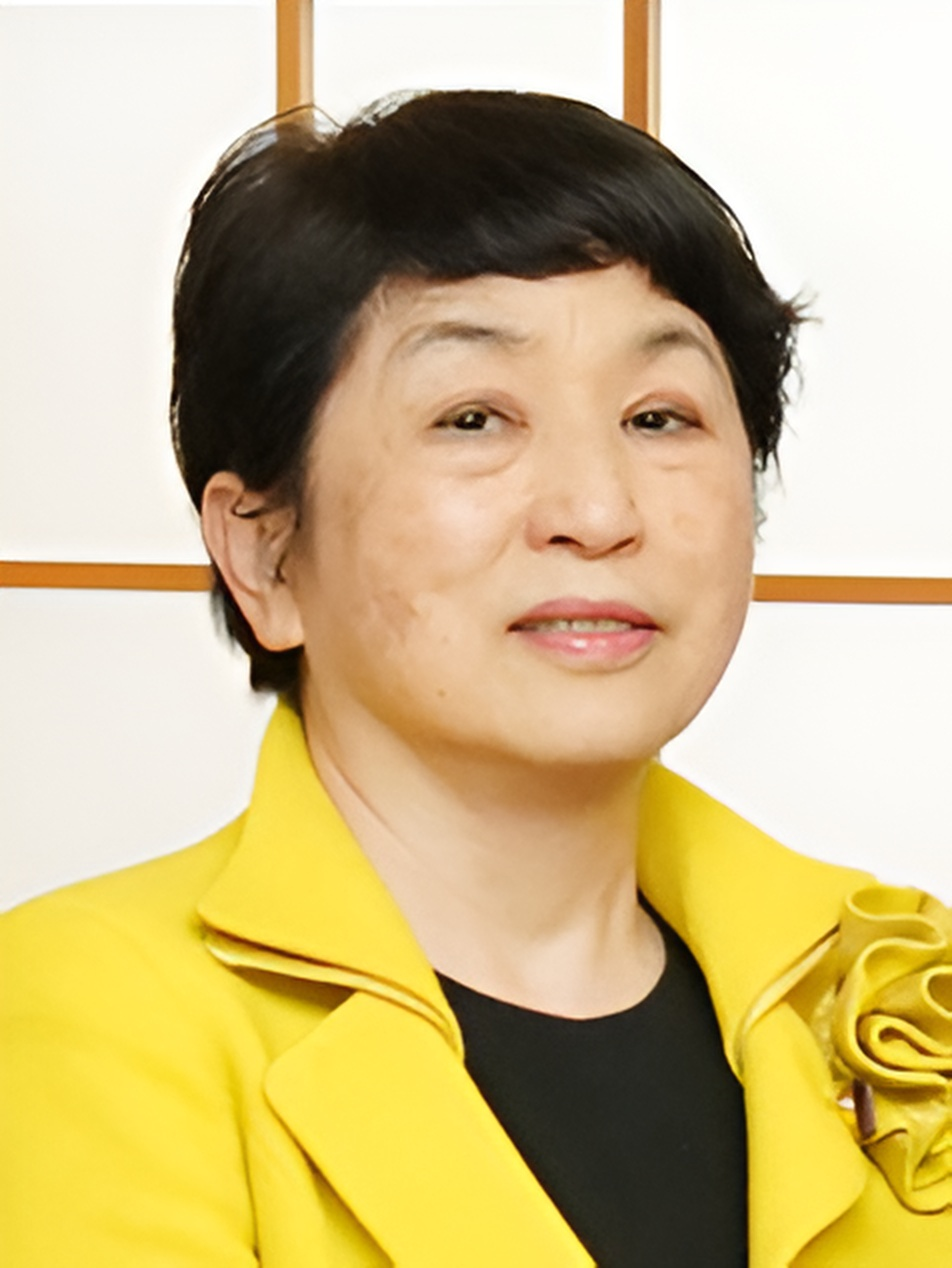
- Fukushima in 2025

Chairwoman of the Social Democratic Party
- Incumbent
- Assumed office 22 February 2020
- Preceded by: Seiji Mataichi
- In office 15 November 2003 – 25 July 2013
- Preceded by: Takako Doi
- Succeeded by: Tadatomo Yoshida

Member of the Senate
- Incumbent
- Assumed office 26 July 1998
- Constituency: National PR

Minister of State for Consumer Affairs and Food Safety
- In office 16 September 2009 – 28 May 2010
- Prime Minister: Yukio Hatoyama
- Preceded by: Office established
- Succeeded by: Hirofumi Hirano

Special Adviser to the Prime Minister for Low Birth Rate
- In office 16 September 2009 – 28 May 2010
- Prime Minister: Yukio Hatoyama
- Preceded by: Position established

Special Advisor to the Prime Minister for Sex Equality
- In office 16 September 2009 – 28 May 2010
- Prime Minister: Yukio Hatoyama
- Preceded by: Position established

Personal details
- Born: 24 December 1955 (age 70) Nobeoka, Miyazaki, Japan
- Party: Social Democratic
- Education: University of Tokyo
- Occupation: Politician, lawyer

Mizuho Fukushima (福島 瑞穂, Fukushima Mizuho; born 24 December 1955) is a Japanese politician and attorney. A native of Nobeoka, Miyazaki, she has been a member of the Senate since 1998, was re-elected in 2004 and 2010, and was the head of the Social Democratic Party of Japan (SDP), from 2003 to 2013. She was elected as the leader of the party for a second time in February 2020.

== Education and career before politics ==
After graduating from the University of Tokyo with a Bachelor of Laws degree, she became a lawyer in 1987. She was a Visiting Professor at Gakushuin Women's College.

== Political career and political views ==
Fukushima was also Minister of State for Consumer Affairs and Food Safety, Social Affairs, and Gender Equality in Prime Minister Yukio Hatoyama's cabinet (16 September 2009 – 28 May 2010); the SDP was the junior partner in the DPJ-led government coalition. However, in May 2010 disagreements over the issue of the Marine Corps Air Station Futenma led to the sacking of Fukushima from the cabinet on 28 May and the SDP subsequently voted to leave the ruling coalition.

Fukushima's Social Democratic Party has an anti-nuclear platform, and she has been referred to as a prominent anti-nuclear activist. For three decades, she was at the forefront of an often futile fight against the utilities that operated Japan's nuclear reactors, the corporations that built them and the bureaucrats who enabled them. That situation changed with the Fukushima Daiichi nuclear disaster in March 2011.

She has stated her opposition to capital punishment on the SDP's website.

After a disappointing result in the 2013 election for the House of Councillors she announced her resignation as head of the party.

Fukushima was elected as the leader of the Social Democratic Party on 22 February 2020.

Fukushima was a recipient of the Knights of the Ordre national du Mérite in December 2020.

== See also ==
- Katsumi Furitsu
