= 2004 Japanese House of Councillors election =

- 11 July 2004

121 of the 242 seats in the House of Councillors 122 seats needed for a majority
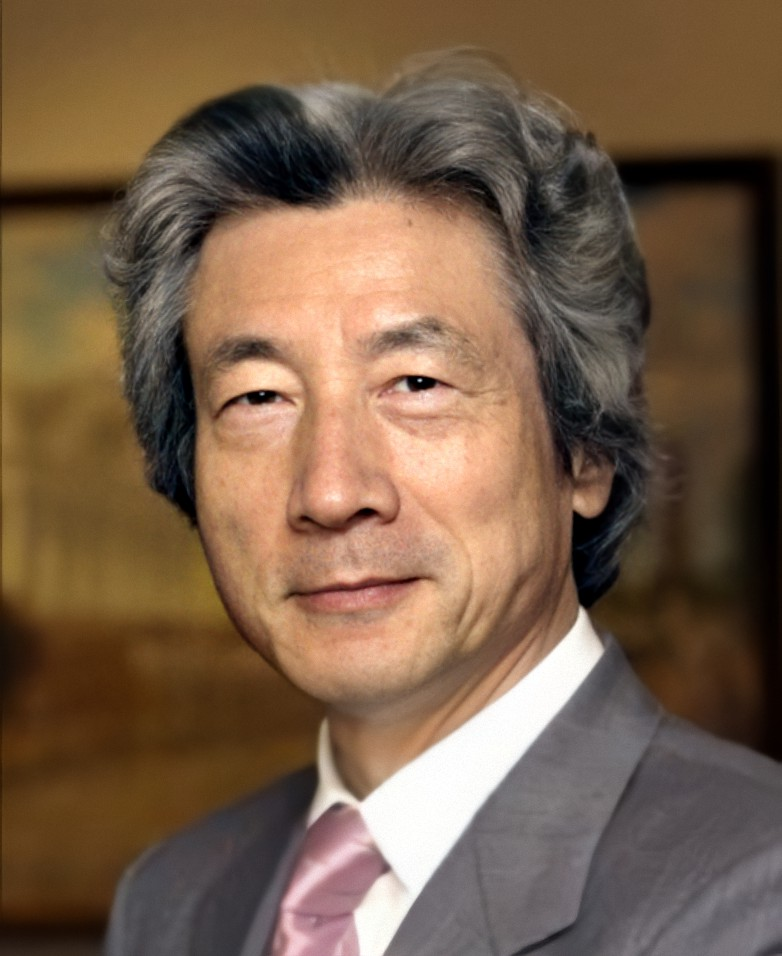

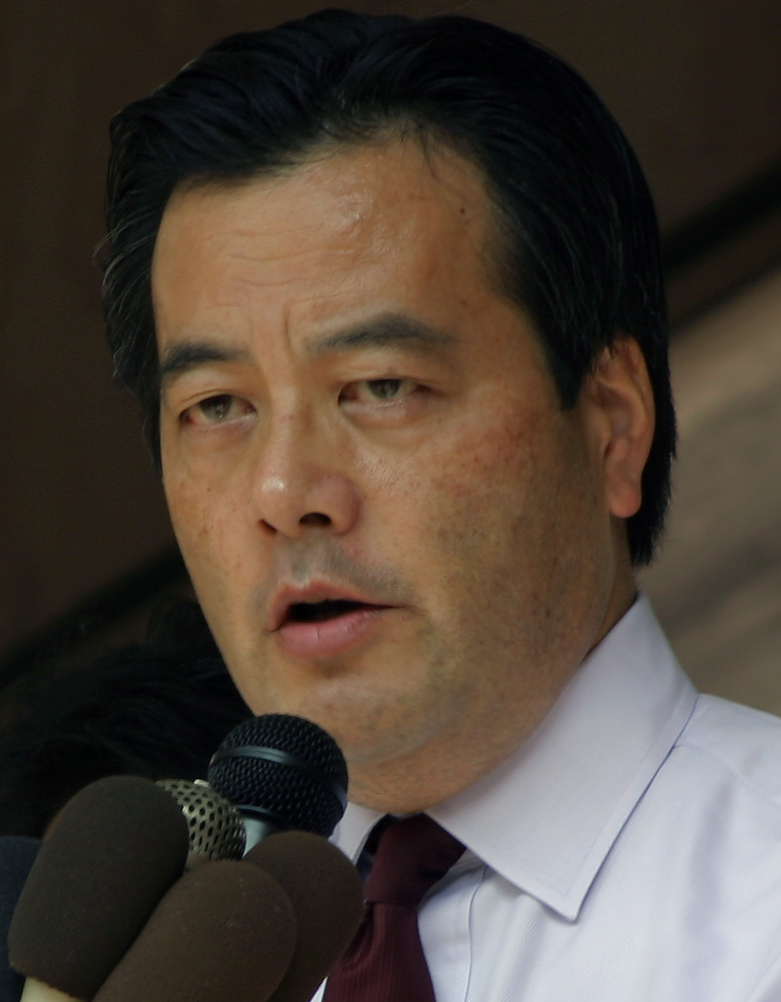

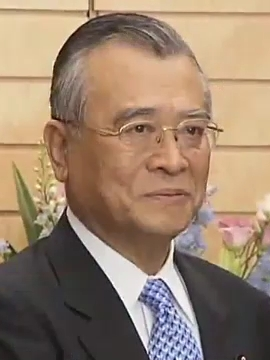

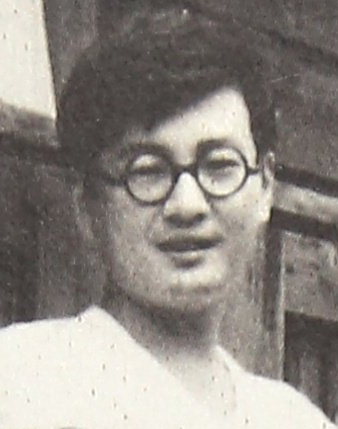

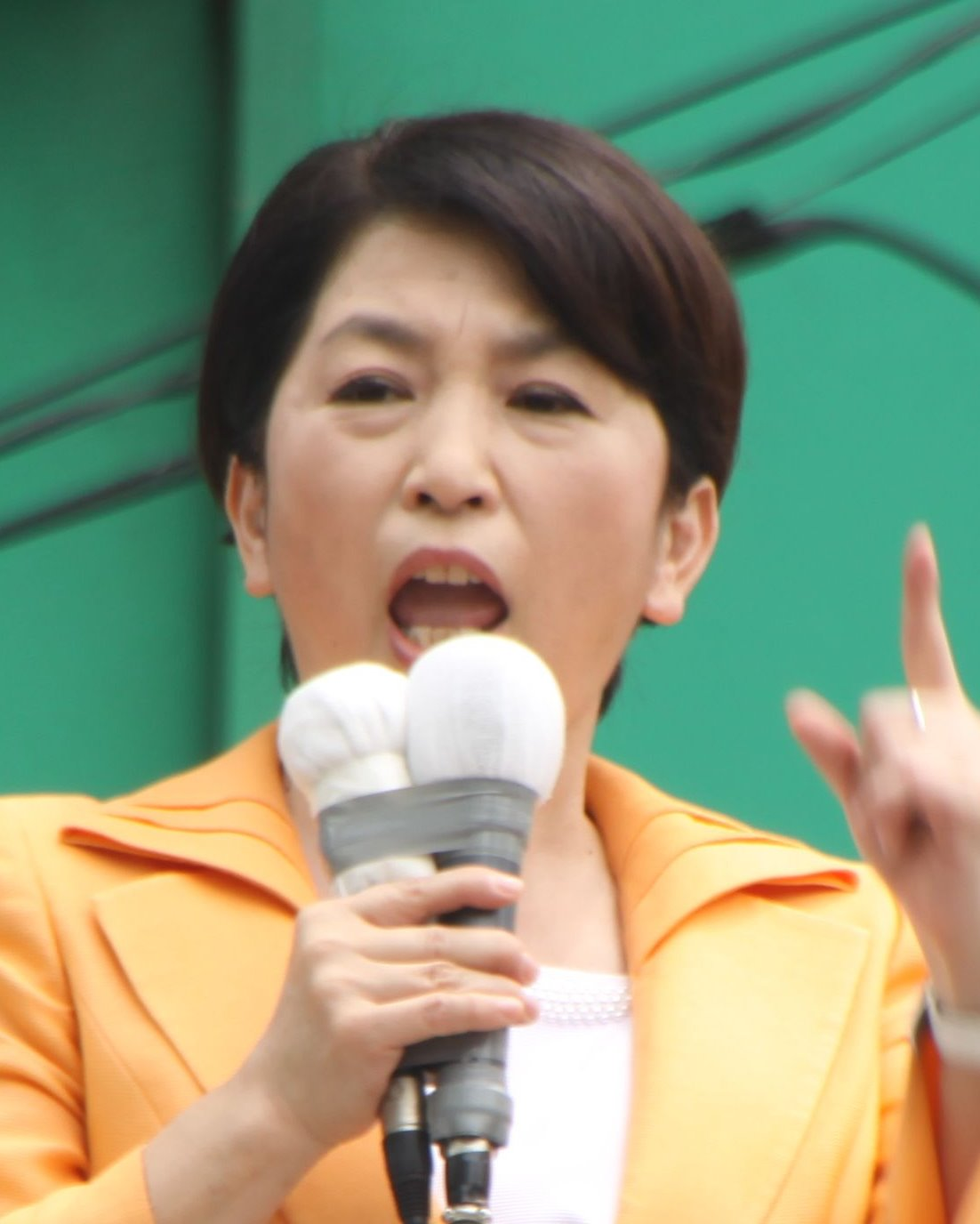
	First party	Second party	Third party
Leader	Junichiro Koizumi	Katsuya Okada	Takenori Kanzaki
Party	LDP	Democratic	Komeito
Last election	110 seats	67 seats (Note: DPJ and Liberal Party.)	23 seats
Seats won	49	50	11
Seats after	115	82	24
Seat change	▲5	▲15	▲1
Constituency vote	19,687,954	21,931,985	2,161,764
% and swing	35.09% (▼5.95pp)	39.09% (▲15.02pp)	3.85% (▼2.53pp)
National vote	16,797,686	21,137,457	8,621,265
% and swing	30.03% (▼8.54pp)	37.79% (▲13.65pp)	15.41% (▲0.45pp)
	Fourth party	Fifth party
Leader	Tetsuzo Fuwa	Mizuho Fukushima
Party	JCP	Social Democratic
Last election	20 seats	8 seats
Seats won	4	2
Seats after	9	5
Seat change	▼11	▼3
Constituency vote	5,520,141	984,340
% and swing	9.84% (▼0.03pp)	1.75% (▼1.70pp)
National vote	4,362,574	2,990,666
% and swing	7.80% (▼0.11pp)	5.35% (▼1.28pp)
- Constituency and proportional representation (bottom right) election result
President of the House of Councillors before election
Hiroyuki Kurata
LDP
Elected President of the House of Councillors
Chikage Oogi
LDP

House of Councillors elections were held in Japan on 11 July 2004. The House of Councillors consisted of 242 members who served six-year terms. Approximately half the members are elected every three years. At these elections 121 members were elected. Of these 73 were elected from the 47 prefectural districts and 48 were elected from a nationwide list by proportional representation.

== Contesting parties ==
Government

- Liberal Democratic Party (conservative)
- New Komeito (theocratic Buddhist, conservative)

Opposition

- Democratic Party (social-democratic/liberal)
- Japanese Communist Party (communist)
- Social Democratic Party (social-democratic)

== Results ==
The opposition Democratic Party won a plurality of the popular vote and seats contested in the election, sweeping the liberal urban areas. The ruling Liberal Democratic Party failed to win in its strongholds but once more received most of its support from the agrarian areas. New Komeito did well, reaching its goals, as did the Social Democratic Party. The Japanese Communist Party did not reach its goals, while independents won the rest of the seats. The Liberal League and Green Political Assembly failed to win any seats.

Party	National			Constituency			Seats			
Party	Votes	%	Seats	Votes	%	Seats	Not up	Won	Total after	+/–
Democratic Party of Japan	21,137,457	37.79	19	21,931,985	39.09	31	32	50	82	+23
Liberal Democratic Party	16,797,686	30.03	15	19,687,954	35.09	34	66	49	115	+5
New Komeito Party	8,621,265	15.41	8	2,161,764	3.85	3	13	11	24	+1
Japanese Communist Party	4,362,574	7.80	4	5,520,141	9.84	0	5	4	9	–11
Social Democratic Party	2,990,666	5.35	2	984,340	1.75	0	3	2	5	–3
Women's Party	989,882	1.77	0				0	0	0	0
Green Political Assembly	903,776	1.62	0				0	0	0	New
Ishin Seito Shimpu	128,478	0.23	0	117,780	0.21	0	0	0	0	0
Other parties				8,382	0.01	0	0	0	0	–
Independents				5,696,505	10.15	5	2	5	7	–1
Total	55,931,784	100.00	48	56,108,851	100.00	73	121	121	242	–5
Valid votes	55,931,785	96.42		56,108,852	96.75					
Invalid/blank votes	2,074,327	3.58		1,881,905	3.25					
Total votes	58,006,112	100.00		57,990,757	100.00					
Registered voters/turnout	102,588,411	56.54		102,507,526	56.57					
Source: MIC, National Diet

=== Detailed results ===
Elected

Prefectural districts
Constituency	Previous members		Elected members		Votes	%	Status
Hokkaido & Tohoku
Hokkaido	Yoshio Nakagawa	LDP	Yoshio Nakagawa	LDP	741,831	26.7	LDP hold
Hokkaido	Naoki Minezaki	DPJ	Naoki Minezaki	DPJ	618,277	22.3	DPJ hold
Aomori	Masami Tanabu	DPJ	Masami Tanabu	DPJ	297,116	47.5	DPJ hold
Iwate	Motoo Shiina	Ind.	Ryo Shuhama	DPJ	339,796	48.5	DPJ gain from Ind.
Miyagi	Ichiro Ichikawa	LDP	Ichiro Ichikawa	LDP	379,342	38.4	LDP hold
Miyagi	Mitsuru Sakurai	DPJ	Mitsuru Sakurai	DPJ	372,817	37.8	DPJ hold
Akita	Shigenobu Saito	LDP	Yoetsu Suzuki	Ind.	310,657	50.2	Ind. gain from LDP
Yamagata	Koichi Kishi	LDP	Koichi Kishi	LDP	279,349	46.8	LDP hold
Fukushima	Yūhei Satō	DPJ	Yūhei Satō	DPJ	445,560	45.4	DPJ hold
Fukushima	Mitsuhide Iwaki	LDP	Mitsuhide Iwaki	LDP	406,793	41.5	LDP hold
Kanto
Ibaraki	Hiroshi Okada	LDP	Hiroshi Okada	LDP	583,471	50.5	LDP hold
Ibaraki	Akira Gunji	DPJ	Akira Gunji	DPJ	477,948	41.3	DPJ hold
Tochigi	Susumu Yanase	DPJ	Susumu Yanase	DPJ	388,356	49.2	DPJ hold
Tochigi	Tetsuro Yano	LDP	Tetsuro Yano	LDP	332,513	42.1	LDP hold
Gunma	Kosei Ueno	LDP	Yukio Tomioka	DPJ	314,996	34.5	DPJ gain from LDP
Gunma	Hirofumi Nakasone	LDP	Hirofumi Nakasone	LDP	276,229	30.3	LDP hold
Saitama	Toshio Fujii	DPJ	Chiyako Shimada	DPJ	824,127	28.4	DPJ hold
Saitama	Masakazu Sekiguchi	LDP	Masakazu Sekiguchi	LDP	718,689	24.8	LDP hold
Saitama	Renzo Togashi	JCP	Makoto Nishida	Komei	539,417	18.6	Komei gain from JCP
Chiba	Wakako Hironaka	DPJ	Wakako Hironaka	DPJ	1,187,663	49.1	DPJ hold
Chiba	Kazuyasu Shiina	LDP	Kazuyasu Shiina	LDP	944,231	39.0	LDP hold
Tokyo	Miyo Inoue	JCP	Masaharu Nakagawa	LDP	1,014,293	18.3	LDP gain from JCP
Tokyo	Toshio Ogawa	DPJ	Toshio Ogawa	DPJ	991,477	17.9	DPJ hold
Tokyo	Atsuo Nakamura	Green	Renhō	DPJ	924,643	16.7	DPJ gain from Green
Tokyo	Toshiko Hamayotsu	Komei	Yuji Sawa	Komei	827,091	14.9	Komei hold
Kanagawa	Kimie Hatano	JCP	Akio Koizumi	LDP	1,217,100	33.2	LDP gain from JCP
Kanagawa	Keiichiro Asao	DPJ	Keiichiro Asao	DPJ	856,504	23.4	DPJ hold
Kanagawa	Keiko Chiba	DPJ	Keiko Chiba	DPJ	843,759	23.0	DPJ hold
Chubu
Niigata	Kinuko Oofuchi	SDP	Masamichi Kondo	Ind.	428,117	34.9	Ind. gain from SDP
Niigata	Naoki Tanaka	LDP	Naoki Tanaka	LDP	367,059	29.9	LDP hold
Toyama	Masaaki Tanibayashi	DPJ	Tsunenori Kawai	LDP	236,318	46.3	LDP gain from DPJ
Ishikawa	Souta Iwamoto	Ind.	Naoki Okada	LDP	289,697	56.1	LDP gain from Ind.
Fukui	Masaaki Yamazaki	LDP	Masaaki Yamazaki	LDP	218,885	56.0	LDP hold
Yamanashi	Azuma Koshiishi	DPJ	Azuma Koshiishi	DPJ	231,631	55.1	DPJ hold
Nagano	Toshimi Kitazawa	DPJ	Toshimi Kitazawa	DPJ	432,287	40.9	DPJ hold
Nagano	Masatoshi Wakabayashi	LDP	Masatoshi Wakabayashi	LDP	287,712	27.2	LDP hold
Gifu	Iwao Matsuda	LDP	Iwao Matsuda	LDP	428,988	44.5	LDP hold
Gifu	Yasuo Yamashita	DPJ	Yasuo Yamashita	DPJ	422,235	43.8	DPJ hold
Shizuoka	Yoshihiko Yamashita	LDP	Yukiko Sakamoto	LDP	501,618	29.2	LDP hold
Shizuoka	Tooru Unno	DPJ	Yuji Fujimoto	DPJ	369,573	21.6	DPJ hold
Aichi	Hiroko Hatta	JCP	Katsuhito Asano	LDP	824,941	28.2	LDP gain from JCP
Aichi	Taisuke Sato	DPJ	Taisuke Sato	DPJ	742,882	25.4	DPJ hold
Aichi	Yoshitake Kimata	DPJ	Yoshitake Kimata	DPJ	672,450	23.0	DPJ hold
Mie	Juuro Saito	LDP	Hirokazu Shiba	DPJ	470,940	52.1	DPJ gain from LDP
Kansai
Shiga	Eisuke Kawamoto	LDP	Kumiko Hayashi	DPJ	290,660	48.0	DPJ gain from LDP
Kyoto	Tetsuro Fukuyama	DPJ	Tetsuro Fukuyama	DPJ	484,297	43.8	DPJ hold
Kyoto	Tokiko Nishiyama	JCP	Satoshi Ninoyu	LDP	358,512	32.4	LDP gain from JCP
Osaka	Kiyoshi Nishikawa	Ind.	Motoyuki Odachi	DPJ	910,597	24.9	DPJ gain from Ind.
Osaka	Eiichi Yamashita	Komei	Eiichi Yamashita	Komei	795,256	21.8	Komei hold
Osaka	Takeshi Miyamoto	JCP	Issei Kitagawa	LDP	735,164	20.1	LDP gain from JCP
Hyogo	Shoji Motooka	DPJ	Shunichi Mizuoka	DPJ	910,114	38.6	DPJ hold
Hyogo	Tatsumi Osawa	JCP	Shinsuke Suematsu	LDP	791,286	33.5	LDP gain from JCP
Nara	Minao Hattori	LDP	Kiyoshige Maekawa	DPJ	311,990	38.9	DPJ gain from LDP
Wakayama	Yōsuke Tsuruho	LDP	Yōsuke Tsuruho	LDP	255,478	53.8	LDP hold
Chugoku
Tottori	Kotaro Tamura	LDP	Kotaro Tamura	LDP	151,737	49.7	LDP hold
Shimane	Mikio Aoki	LDP	Mikio Aoki	LDP	254,704	62.1	LDP hold
Okayama	Satsuki Eda	DPJ	Satsuki Eda	DPJ	498,515	55.7	DPJ hold
Okayama	Norifumi Kato	LDP	Seat abolished				LDP loss
Hiroshima	Minoru Yanagida	DPJ	Minoru Yanagida	DPJ	509,875	42.6	DPJ hold
Hiroshima	Ikuo Kamei	LDP	Ikuo Kamei	LDP	493,817	41.3	LDP hold
Yamaguchi	Masuo Matsuoka	DPJ	Nobuo Kishi	LDP	365,462	49.1	LDP gain from DPJ
Shikoku
Tokushima	Kiseko Takahashi	Green	Masakatsu Koike	LDP	166,032	47.1	LDP gain from Green
Kagawa	Toshio Yamauchi	LDP	Toshio Yamauchi	LDP	204,392	46.6	LDP hold
Ehime	Takeshi Noma	LDP	Junzo Yamamoto	LDP	322,152	49.4	LDP hold
Kochi	Hiroyuki Morishita	LDP	Hajime Hirota	Ind.	159,178	43.6	Ind. gain from LDP
Kyushu & Okinawa
Fukuoka	Kazuo Hirotomo	Komei	Tsutomu Okubo	DPJ	840,783	40.6	DPJ gain from Komei
Fukuoka	Gotaro Yoshimura	LDP	Gotaro Yoshimura	LDP	636,406	30.7	LDP hold
Saga	Hiromi Iwanaga	LDP	Hiromi Iwanaga	LDP	197,100	47.7	LDP hold
Nagasaki	Soichiro Matsutani	LDP	Tadashi Inuzuka	DPJ	344,606	39.5	DPJ gain from LDP
Kumamoto	Hitoshi Kimura	LDP	Hitoshi Kimura	LDP	411,542	48.9	LDP hold
Kumamoto	Ryoichi Honda	DPJ	Seat abolished				DPJ loss
Oita	Toshiya Nakamichi	LDP	Shinya Adachi	DPJ	341,741	54.8	DPJ gain from LDP
Miyazaki	Mitsuhiro Uesugi	LDP	Shinpei Matsushita	Ind.	277,352	48.5	Ind. gain from LDP
Kagoshima	Hiroshi Moriyama	LDP	Tetsuro Nomura	LDP	455,591	53.2	LDP hold
Kagoshima	Vacant	LDP	Seat abolished				LDP loss
Okinawa	Soko Shimabuku	Ind.	Keiko Itokazu	Ind.	316,148	58.9	Ind. gain from Ind.

Proportional representation results
Party	Votes	Seats	Elected member	Pref. votes
DPJ	21,137,458 (37.8%)	19	Masao Kobayashi	301,322
DPJ	21,137,458 (37.8%)	19	Toshiyuki Kato	247,917
DPJ	21,137,458 (37.8%)	19	Masamitsu Naito	220,311
DPJ	21,137,458 (37.8%)	19	Satoru Ienishi	217,095
DPJ	21,137,458 (37.8%)	19	Mitsuyoshi Yanagisawa	216,760
DPJ	21,137,458 (37.8%)	19	Masayuki Naoshima	211,257
DPJ	21,137,458 (37.8%)	19	Masamitsu Oishi	209,382
DPJ	21,137,458 (37.8%)	19	Shinkun Haku	203,052
DPJ	21,137,458 (37.8%)	19	Masayoshi Nataniya	202,612
DPJ	21,137,458 (37.8%)	19	Kenzo Fujisue	182,891
DPJ	21,137,458 (37.8%)	19	Shoukichi Kina	178,815
DPJ	21,137,458 (37.8%)	19	Yoshimitsu Takashima	167,818
DPJ	21,137,458 (37.8%)	19	Yataro Tsuda	162,509
DPJ	21,137,458 (37.8%)	19	Kentaro Kudo	142,656
DPJ	21,137,458 (37.8%)	19	Yoriko Madoka	130,249
DPJ	21,137,458 (37.8%)	19	Atsuko Shimoda	120,306
DPJ	21,137,458 (37.8%)	19	Toru Matsuoka	114,136
DPJ	21,137,458 (37.8%)	19	Takeshi Maeda	110,043
DPJ	21,137,458 (37.8%)	19	Hideo Watanabe	106,141
LDP	16,797,687 (30.0%)	15	Heizō Takenaka	722,505
LDP	16,797,687 (30.0%)	15	Tsukasa Akimoto	305,613
LDP	16,797,687 (30.0%)	15	Kensei Hasegawa	282,919
LDP	16,797,687 (30.0%)	15	Masashi Waki	253,738
LDP	16,797,687 (30.0%)	15	Hidetoshi Nishijima	250,426
LDP	16,797,687 (30.0%)	15	Eriko Yamatani	242,063
LDP	16,797,687 (30.0%)	15	Hirohiko Nakamura	199,510
LDP	16,797,687 (30.0%)	15	Shinya Izumi	196,499
LDP	16,797,687 (30.0%)	15	Kenji Ogiwara	194,854
LDP	16,797,687 (30.0%)	15	Tokio Kano	188,630
LDP	16,797,687 (30.0%)	15	Hiroyuki Arai	179,567
LDP	16,797,687 (30.0%)	15	Toshiei Mizuochi	171,945
LDP	16,797,687 (30.0%)	15	Akio Sato	167,350
LDP	16,797,687 (30.0%)	15	Chieko Nōno	152,685
LDP	16,797,687 (30.0%)	15	Yoshifumi Matsumura	152,630
Komei	8,621,265 (15.4%)	8	Toshiko Hamayotsu	1,822,283
Komei	8,621,265 (15.4%)	8	Kazuo Hirotomo	996,188
Komei	8,621,265 (15.4%)	8	Masaaki Taniai	835,983
Komei	8,621,265 (15.4%)	8	Kiyohiro Araki	816,115
Komei	8,621,265 (15.4%)	8	Hisashi Kazama	787,886
Komei	8,621,265 (15.4%)	8	Tomoko Ukishima	773,749
Komei	8,621,265 (15.4%)	8	Masayoshi Hamada	33,310
Komei	8,621,265 (15.4%)	8	Yoko Wanibuchi	17,173
JCP	4,362,574 (7.8%)	4	Tadayoshi Ichida	199,930
JCP	4,362,574 (7.8%)	4	Akira Koike	105,481
JCP	4,362,574 (7.8%)	4	Sohei Nihi	73,662
JCP	4,362,574 (7.8%)	4	Mikishi Daimon	73,631
SDP	2,990,665 (5.3%)	2	Mizuho Fukushima	640,832
SDP	2,990,665 (5.3%)	2	Sadao Fuchigami	122,640
