= 1998 Japanese House of Councillors election =

- 12 July 1998

126 of the 252 seats in the House of Councillors 127 seats needed for a majority
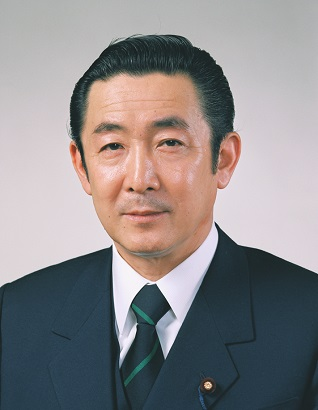

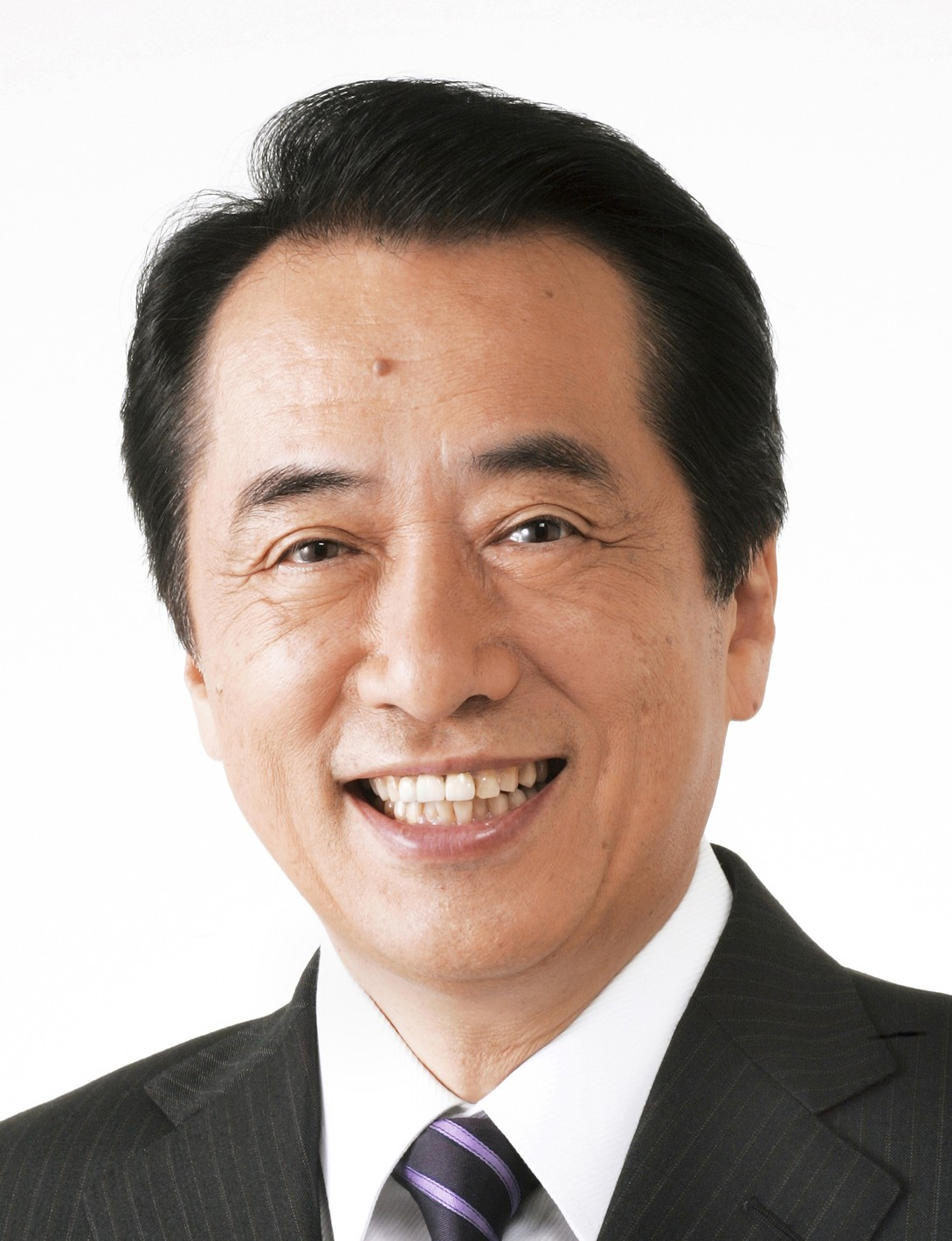

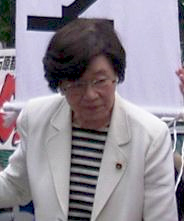

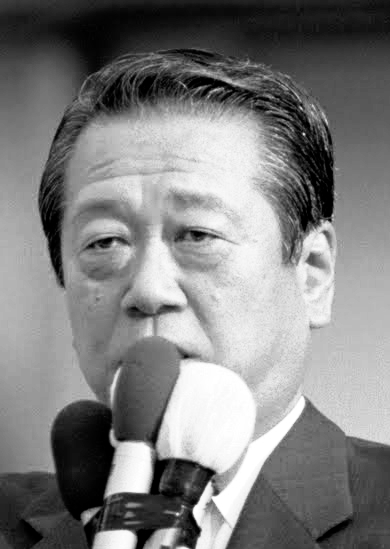
	First party	Second party	Third party
Leader	Ryutaro Hashimoto	Naoto Kan	Tetsuzo Fuwa
Party	LDP	Democratic	JCP
Last election	107 seats	Did not exist	14 seats
Seats won	44	27	15
Seats after	102	47	23
Seat change	▼16	New	▲9
Constituency vote	17,033,852	9,063,940	8,758,760
% and swing	30.45% (▲5.05pp)	16.20% (New)	15.66% (▲5.28pp)
National vote	14,128,719	12,209,685	8,195,078
% and swing	25.17% (▼2.12pp)	21.75% (New)	14.60% (▲5.07pp)
	Fourth party	Fifth party	Sixth party
Leader	Toshiko Hamayotsu	Takako Doi	Ichirō Ozawa
Party	Komeito	Social Democratic	Liberal
Last election	Did not exist	38 seats (Note: Japan Socialist Party)	Did not exist
Seats won	9	5	6
Seats after	22	13	12
Seat change	New	▼7	New
Constituency vote	1,843,479	2,403,649	980,249
% and swing	3.30% (New)	4.30% (▼7.55pp)	1.75% (New)
National vote	7,748,301	4,370,763	5,207,813
% and swing	13.80% (New)	7.79% (▼9.13pp)	9.28% (New)
- Results of the election, showing the winning candidates in each prefecture and the national PR block.
President of the House
of Councillors before election
Juro Saito
LDP
Elected President of the House
of Councillors
Juro Saito
LDP

House of Councillors elections were held in Japan on 12 July 1998.

The Liberal Democratic Party (LDP) under Ryūtarō Hashimoto had restored single-party government in 1996 and was now aiming to also regain clear control of the House of Councillors, in which it was several seats short of a majority. However, it lost 13 seats in the elections giving the opposition clear control and leading to prime minister Hashimoto announcing his resignation. Keizō Obuchi was elected LDP president on 24 July, defeating Seiroku Kajiyama and Junichirō Koizumi.

On 30 July 1998 Obuchi was designated as prime minister by the Diet against the vote of the House of Councillors where DPJ president Naoto Kan defeated Obuchi by 142 votes to 103. Obuchi entered coalition negotiations in late 1998. In January 1999 the LDP entered a ruling coalition with Ichirō Ozawa's Liberal Party, bringing the government within few seats of a majority; in October 1999 New Komeito also entered the coalition, ending the divided Diet.

== Results ==
Party	National			Constituency			Seats			
Party	Votes	%	Seats	Votes	%	Seats	Not up	Won	Total after	+/–
Liberal Democratic Party	14,128,719	25.17	14	17,033,852	30.45	30	58	44	102	–5
Democratic Party of Japan	12,209,685	21.75	12	9,063,940	16.20	15	20	27	47	New
Japanese Communist Party	8,195,078	14.60	8	8,758,760	15.66	7	8	15	23	+9
New Komeito Party	7,748,301	13.80	7	1,843,479	3.30	2	13	9	22	+11
Liberal Party	5,207,813	9.28	5	980,249	1.75	1	6	6	12	New
Social Democratic Party	4,370,763	7.79	4	2,403,649	4.30	1	8	5	13	–25
New Party Sakigake	784,591	1.40	0				3	0	3	0
Dainiin Club	579,714	1.03	0				0	0	0	–2
Sports and Peace Party	477,284	0.85	0	72,886	0.13	0	0	0	0	–1
Reformers Club							3	0	3	New
Other parties	2,435,075	4.34	0	2,894,668	5.17	0	1	0	1	–
Independents				12,884,582	23.03	20	6	20	26	+11
Total	56,137,023	100.00	50	55,936,065	100.00	76	126	126	252	0
Valid votes	56,137,023	96.34		55,936,065	95.98					
Invalid/blank votes	2,131,937	3.66		2,344,331	4.02					
Total votes	58,268,960	100.00		58,280,396	100.00					
Registered voters/turnout	99,048,700	58.83		99,048,700	58.84					
Source: Ministry of Internal Affairs and Communications, Tottori Prefecture, National Diet

=== By constituency ===
Northern Japan
District	Seats up	Incumbents	Party	Result	Candidates (Party) Vote share
Hokkaidō	2 (−2)	Hisashi Kazama	Komeito	2 seats lost by reapportionment LDP, DPJ and Komeito incumbents retired LDP hold DPJ incumbent re-elected DPJ gains top tōsen	Naoki Minezaki (DPJ) 31.2% Yoshio Nakagawa (LDP) 28.1% Tomoko Uchiyama (JCP) 23.5% Kentarō Ono (LP) 6.3% Shirō Kayano (SDP) 5.7% Masami Mizuyoshi (NSP) 1.3% Ken'ichi Sawada (YLP) 1.3% Ryōko Matsukawa (LL) 1.3% Hideo Murata (I) 1.1% Nobuhito Sendai (Ishin) 0.3%
Hokkaidō	2 (−2)	Noriyuki Nakao	DPJ	2 seats lost by reapportionment LDP, DPJ and Komeito incumbents retired LDP hold DPJ incumbent re-elected DPJ gains top tōsen	Naoki Minezaki (DPJ) 31.2% Yoshio Nakagawa (LDP) 28.1% Tomoko Uchiyama (JCP) 23.5% Kentarō Ono (LP) 6.3% Shirō Kayano (SDP) 5.7% Masami Mizuyoshi (NSP) 1.3% Ken'ichi Sawada (YLP) 1.3% Ryōko Matsukawa (LL) 1.3% Hideo Murata (I) 1.1% Nobuhito Sendai (Ishin) 0.3%
Hokkaidō	2 (−2)	Naoki Minezaki	DPJ	2 seats lost by reapportionment LDP, DPJ and Komeito incumbents retired LDP hold DPJ incumbent re-elected DPJ gains top tōsen	Naoki Minezaki (DPJ) 31.2% Yoshio Nakagawa (LDP) 28.1% Tomoko Uchiyama (JCP) 23.5% Kentarō Ono (LP) 6.3% Shirō Kayano (SDP) 5.7% Masami Mizuyoshi (NSP) 1.3% Ken'ichi Sawada (YLP) 1.3% Ryōko Matsukawa (LL) 1.3% Hideo Murata (I) 1.1% Nobuhito Sendai (Ishin) 0.3%
Hokkaidō	2 (−2)	Masaaki Takagi	LDP	2 seats lost by reapportionment LDP, DPJ and Komeito incumbents retired LDP hold DPJ incumbent re-elected DPJ gains top tōsen	Naoki Minezaki (DPJ) 31.2% Yoshio Nakagawa (LDP) 28.1% Tomoko Uchiyama (JCP) 23.5% Kentarō Ono (LP) 6.3% Shirō Kayano (SDP) 5.7% Masami Mizuyoshi (NSP) 1.3% Ken'ichi Sawada (YLP) 1.3% Ryōko Matsukawa (LL) 1.3% Hideo Murata (I) 1.1% Nobuhito Sendai (Ishin) 0.3%
Aomori	1	Kanpei Matsuo	Independent (ex-NFP)	Incumbent retired Independent (joined IA)	Masami Tanabu (I) 46.7% Akiyoshi Kaneiri (LDP) 36.0% Chizuko Takahashi (JCP) 9.3% Kiyohiko Narumi (I) 7.1% Keiko Saitō (LL) 0.9%
Iwate	1	Motoo Shiina	Independent	Incumbent re-elected (joined IA)	Motoo Shiina (I) 38.5% Riki Nakamura (I) 34.6% Shizuko Abe (SDP) 13.7% Norikatsu Sugawara (JCP) 9.5% Fumiko (?) Yamada (?) 3.7%
Miyagi	2 (+1)	Kaname Endō	LDP	Incumbent lost re-election DPJ pickup DPJ gains top tōsen	Mitsuru Sakurai (DPJ) 26.0% Ichirō Ichikawa (I) 23.2% Kaname Endō (LDP) 14.0% Sayuri Kamata (I) 11.2% Michiko Satō (JCP) 10.6% Yoshihiro Satō (SDP) 7.1% Yukio Nakazawa (I) 3.4% Kikumi Hayasaka (WP) 2.3% Akemi Ishikawa (LL) 2.2%
Miyagi	2 (+1)			1 seat gained by reapportionment LDP hold	Mitsuru Sakurai (DPJ) 26.0% Ichirō Ichikawa (I) 23.2% Kaname Endō (LDP) 14.0% Sayuri Kamata (I) 11.2% Michiko Satō (JCP) 10.6% Yoshihiro Satō (SDP) 7.1% Yukio Nakazawa (I) 3.4% Kikumi Hayasaka (WP) 2.3% Akemi Ishikawa (LL) 2.2%
Akita	1	Man Sasaki	LDP	Incumbent retired LDP hold	Shigenobu Saitō (LDP) 39.9% Tatsurō Nakajima (DPJ) 27.1% Kazuko Ogiwara (JCP) 14.3% Mamoru Kudō (SDP) 13.6% Shunsaku Hiramoto (NSP) 3.2% Haruo Hashimoto (LL) 1.9%
Yamagata	1	Teibin Suzuki	LDP	Incumbent retired LDP hold	Kōichi Kishi (LDP) 49.3% Toshiko Muraki (DPJ) 17.8% Shōji Tanabe (SDP) 16.1% Masaru Aoki (JCP) 10.1% Eiko Gotō (LL) 6.6%
Fukushima	2	Seigo Suzuki	LDP	Incumbent retired LDP hold Incumbent lost re-election DPJ pickup DPJ gains top tōsen	Yūhei Satō (I – DPJ) 32.6% Mitsuhide Iwaki (LDP) 24.9% Shizuo Satō (LDP) 23.6% Hideki Satō (JCP) 10.6% 4 other candidates (I/NSP/YLP/LL) 8.3%
Fukushima	2	Shizuo Satō	LDP	Incumbent retired LDP hold Incumbent lost re-election DPJ pickup DPJ gains top tōsen	Yūhei Satō (I – DPJ) 32.6% Mitsuhide Iwaki (LDP) 24.9% Shizuo Satō (LDP) 23.6% Hideki Satō (JCP) 10.6% 4 other candidates (I/NSP/YLP/LL) 8.3%
Eastern and Central Japan
District	Seats up	Incumbents	Party	Result	Candidates (Party – endorsements) Vote share
Ibaraki	2	Itsuo Nomura	LDP	NSP incumbent retired LDP incumbent lost re-election LDP hold DPJ pickup DPJ gained top tōsen	Akira Gunji (DPJ) 27.9% Kōichi Kuno (LDP) 23.1% Itsuo Nomura (LDP) 19.2% Osamu Ojima (JCP) 10.1% Hiromitsu Mutō (LP) 7.0% Mariko Yoshioka (WP) 5.6% Hiroyuki Sugimori (NSP) 3.4% Takao Gunji (LL) 2.7% Masao Kataniwa (YLP) 1.0%
Ibaraki	2	Osamu Yatabe	NSP	NSP incumbent retired LDP incumbent lost re-election LDP hold DPJ pickup DPJ gained top tōsen	Akira Gunji (DPJ) 27.9% Kōichi Kuno (LDP) 23.1% Itsuo Nomura (LDP) 19.2% Osamu Ojima (JCP) 10.1% Hiromitsu Mutō (LP) 7.0% Mariko Yoshioka (WP) 5.6% Hiroyuki Sugimori (NSP) 3.4% Takao Gunji (LL) 2.7% Masao Kataniwa (YLP) 1.0%
Tochigi	2	Itten Kamiyoshihara	LDP	Incumbent re-elected Incumbent lost re-election DPJ pickup DPJ gained top tōsen	Susumu Yanase (DPJ) 39.7% Tetsurō Yano (LDP) 24.7% Itten Kamiyoshihara (LDP) 19.0% Setsuko Nomura (JCP) 8.3% Iwao Takahashi (SDP) 4.1% Takuo Inaba (I) 1.9% Ichirō Yamada (YLP) 1.7% Tsuneaki Umeki (LL) 0.6%
Tochigi	2	Tetsurō Yano	LDP	Incumbent re-elected Incumbent lost re-election DPJ pickup DPJ gained top tōsen	Susumu Yanase (DPJ) 39.7% Tetsurō Yano (LDP) 24.7% Itten Kamiyoshihara (LDP) 19.0% Setsuko Nomura (JCP) 8.3% Iwao Takahashi (SDP) 4.1% Takuo Inaba (I) 1.9% Ichirō Yamada (YLP) 1.7% Tsuneaki Umeki (LL) 0.6%
Gunma	2	Hirofumi Nakasone	LDP	Incumbents re-elected	Hirofumi Nakasone (LDP) 33.7% Kōsei Ueno (LDP) 25.4% Shio Yamazaki (I) 19.3% Yoshikazu Arima (JCP) 15.2% Yurika Kiya (LL) 6.3%
Gunma	2	Kōsei Ueno	LDP	Incumbents re-elected	Hirofumi Nakasone (LDP) 33.7% Kōsei Ueno (LDP) 25.4% Shio Yamazaki (I) 19.3% Yoshikazu Arima (JCP) 15.2% Yurika Kiya (LL) 6.3%
Saitama	3 (+1)	Noriyuki Sekine	LDP	LDP incumbent lost re-election Independent (ex-NFP) pickup Independent gained top tōsen	Takujirō Hamada (I) 22.6% Renzō Togashi (JCP) 19.9% Toshio Fujii (DPJ) 19.0% Noriyuki Sekine (LDP) 14.3% Minoru Kurihara (LDP) 12.0% Fumihiro Himori (SDP) 5.4% Mieko Yana (LL) 3.2% Tadashi Hosokawa (NSP) 1.6% Kazushige Yamada (YLP) 1.1% Setsuo Yamaguchi (I) 0.7% Masakazu Imazawa (Ishin) 0.2%
Saitama	3 (+1)	Hideyuki Seya	SDP	SDP incumbent retired JCP pickup	Takujirō Hamada (I) 22.6% Renzō Togashi (JCP) 19.9% Toshio Fujii (DPJ) 19.0% Noriyuki Sekine (LDP) 14.3% Minoru Kurihara (LDP) 12.0% Fumihiro Himori (SDP) 5.4% Mieko Yana (LL) 3.2% Tadashi Hosokawa (NSP) 1.6% Kazushige Yamada (YLP) 1.1% Setsuo Yamaguchi (I) 0.7% Masakazu Imazawa (Ishin) 0.2%
Saitama	3 (+1)			1 seat gained by reapportionment DPJ pickup	Takujirō Hamada (I) 22.6% Renzō Togashi (JCP) 19.9% Toshio Fujii (DPJ) 19.0% Noriyuki Sekine (LDP) 14.3% Minoru Kurihara (LDP) 12.0% Fumihiro Himori (SDP) 5.4% Mieko Yana (LL) 3.2% Tadashi Hosokawa (NSP) 1.6% Kazushige Yamada (YLP) 1.1% Setsuo Yamaguchi (I) 0.7% Masakazu Imazawa (Ishin) 0.2%
Chiba	2	Wakako Hironaka	Independent	Incumbents re-elected	Wakako Hironaka (I) 32.3% Yutaka Inoue (LDP) 31.4% Makoto Nakajima (JCP) 21.2% Keiko Machiyama (WP) 5.0% Etsuko Nagata (NSP) 4.6% Tsuneari Murata (LL) 3.4% Kunihide Yoshinaga (YLP) 2.1%
Chiba	2	Yutaka Inoue	LDP	Incumbents re-elected	Wakako Hironaka (I) 32.3% Yutaka Inoue (LDP) 31.4% Makoto Nakajima (JCP) 21.2% Keiko Machiyama (WP) 5.0% Etsuko Nagata (NSP) 4.6% Tsuneari Murata (LL) 3.4% Kunihide Yoshinaga (YLP) 2.1%
Tokyo	4	Toshiko Hamayotsu	Komeito	Komeito incumbent re-elected DPJ pickup DPJ gained top tōsen	Toshio Ogawa (DPJ) 19.2% Toshiko Hamayotsu (Komeito) 18.1% Miyo Inoue (JCP) 16.8% Atsuo Nakamura (I) 13.4% Kiyoko Ono (LDP) 11.6% Kōji Tsukahara (LDP) 8.4% Tetsu Ueda (I) 4.3% Shunsuke Iwasaki (SDP) 3.8% Hiroko Suzuki (WP) 0.8% Shintarō Kō (LL) 0.8% Yoshimori Inori (SPP) 0.7% Eiko Toyama (NSP) 0.7% Isao Nakamura (YLP) 0.6% 10 other candidates 0.7%
Tokyo	4	Kōichirō Ueda	JCP	Komeito incumbent re-elected DPJ pickup DPJ gained top tōsen	Toshio Ogawa (DPJ) 19.2% Toshiko Hamayotsu (Komeito) 18.1% Miyo Inoue (JCP) 16.8% Atsuo Nakamura (I) 13.4% Kiyoko Ono (LDP) 11.6% Kōji Tsukahara (LDP) 8.4% Tetsu Ueda (I) 4.3% Shunsuke Iwasaki (SDP) 3.8% Hiroko Suzuki (WP) 0.8% Shintarō Kō (LL) 0.8% Yoshimori Inori (SPP) 0.7% Eiko Toyama (NSP) 0.7% Isao Nakamura (YLP) 0.6% 10 other candidates 0.7%
Tokyo	4	vacant (last held by Kensaku Morita, LDP)		LDP incumbent lost re-election JCP incumbent retired JCP hold NPH pickup	Toshio Ogawa (DPJ) 19.2% Toshiko Hamayotsu (Komeito) 18.1% Miyo Inoue (JCP) 16.8% Atsuo Nakamura (I) 13.4% Kiyoko Ono (LDP) 11.6% Kōji Tsukahara (LDP) 8.4% Tetsu Ueda (I) 4.3% Shunsuke Iwasaki (SDP) 3.8% Hiroko Suzuki (WP) 0.8% Shintarō Kō (LL) 0.8% Yoshimori Inori (SPP) 0.7% Eiko Toyama (NSP) 0.7% Isao Nakamura (YLP) 0.6% 10 other candidates 0.7%
Tokyo	4	Kiyoko Ono	LDP	LDP incumbent lost re-election JCP incumbent retired JCP hold NPH pickup	Toshio Ogawa (DPJ) 19.2% Toshiko Hamayotsu (Komeito) 18.1% Miyo Inoue (JCP) 16.8% Atsuo Nakamura (I) 13.4% Kiyoko Ono (LDP) 11.6% Kōji Tsukahara (LDP) 8.4% Tetsu Ueda (I) 4.3% Shunsuke Iwasaki (SDP) 3.8% Hiroko Suzuki (WP) 0.8% Shintarō Kō (LL) 0.8% Yoshimori Inori (SPP) 0.7% Eiko Toyama (NSP) 0.7% Isao Nakamura (YLP) 0.6% 10 other candidates 0.7%
Kanagawa	3 (+1)	Fumio Saitō	LDP	DPJ incumbent re-elected LDP incumbent lost re-election DPJ pickup DPJ gains top tōsen	Keiichirō Asao (DPJ) 18.0% Kimie Hatano (JCP) 14.8% Keiko Chiba (DPJ) 14.3% Marutei Tsurunen (I) 14.1% Fumio Saitō (LDP) 13.0% Tomoko Abe (SDP) 8.4% Isao Makishima (LDP) 8.0% Takashi Hidaka (LP) 6.8% Yoshiko Bannai (NSP) 0.8% Katsuo Satō (YLP) 0.5% 5 other candidates 1.4%
Kanagawa	3 (+1)	Keiko Chiba	DPJ	DPJ incumbent re-elected LDP incumbent lost re-election DPJ pickup DPJ gains top tōsen	Keiichirō Asao (DPJ) 18.0% Kimie Hatano (JCP) 14.8% Keiko Chiba (DPJ) 14.3% Marutei Tsurunen (I) 14.1% Fumio Saitō (LDP) 13.0% Tomoko Abe (SDP) 8.4% Isao Makishima (LDP) 8.0% Takashi Hidaka (LP) 6.8% Yoshiko Bannai (NSP) 0.8% Katsuo Satō (YLP) 0.5% 5 other candidates 1.4%
Kanagawa	3 (+1)			1 seat gained by reapportionment JCP pickup	Keiichirō Asao (DPJ) 18.0% Kimie Hatano (JCP) 14.8% Keiko Chiba (DPJ) 14.3% Marutei Tsurunen (I) 14.1% Fumio Saitō (LDP) 13.0% Tomoko Abe (SDP) 8.4% Isao Makishima (LDP) 8.0% Takashi Hidaka (LP) 6.8% Yoshiko Bannai (NSP) 0.8% Katsuo Satō (YLP) 0.5% 5 other candidates 1.4%
Niigata	2	Kazuo Majima	LDP	SDP incumbent re-elected LDP incumbent lost re-election LDP hold (Tanaka was retroactively recognized as LDP candidate)	Naoki Tanaka (I) 24.6% Kinuko Ōbuchi (SDP) 22.1% Kazuo Majima (LDP) 20.2% Yukio Hoshino (I) 18.7% Kanji Igarashi (JCP) 8.2% Satoshi Honda (LP) 3.8% Kazuaki Meguro (LL) 2.4%
Niigata	2	Kinuko Ōbuchi	SDP	SDP incumbent re-elected LDP incumbent lost re-election LDP hold (Tanaka was retroactively recognized as LDP candidate)	Naoki Tanaka (I) 24.6% Kinuko Ōbuchi (SDP) 22.1% Kazuo Majima (LDP) 20.2% Yukio Hoshino (I) 18.7% Kanji Igarashi (JCP) 8.2% Satoshi Honda (LP) 3.8% Kazuaki Meguro (LL) 2.4%
Toyama	1	Yoshio Nagata	LDP	Incumbent re-elected post-election: incumbent died within 3 months, DPJ pickup by kuriage-tōsen	Yoshio Nagata (LDP) 47.7% Masaaki Tanibayashi (DPJ) 21.1% Shigeru Tajiri (SDP) 17.3% Kazuyuki Izumino (JCP) 11.0% Hisayoshi Nakada (LL) 2.9%
Ishikawa	1	Tetsuo Kutsukake	LDP	Incumbent lost re-election Independent pickup (joined IA)	Sōta Iwamoto (I) 45.1% Tetsuo Kutsukake (LDP) 42.4% Yōko Onishi (JCP) 9.4% Hideyuki Tanebe (LL) 3.1%
Fukui	1	Masaaki Yamazaki	LDP	Incumbent re-elected	Masaaki Yamazaki (LDP) 52.3% Keimin Kyōtō (DPJ) 28.6% Kunihiro Uno (JCP) 10.5% Kyōko Murata (LL) 8.6%
Yamanashi	1	Tetsurō Shimura	LDP	Incumbent retired DPJ pickup	Azuma Koshiishi (I) 43.3% Tsukasa Hosaka (LDP) 39.9% Akiko Endō (JCP) 10.8% Yūko Kamata (LP) 7.8% Masako Fukasawa (LL) 1.5%
Nagano	2	Toshimi Kitazawa	DPJ	Incumbent re-elected Incumbent retired LDP pickup	Toshimi Kitazawa (DPJ) 38.6% Masatoshi Wakabayashi (LDP) 23.3% Norihisa Yamaguchi (JCP) 18.2% Yukio Nunome (SDP) 10.4% Shin'ichirō Shimojō (I) 6.8% Shigeo Kusama (I) 1.2% Yutaka Tanaka (LL) 1.2% Keisaburō Okuhara (I) 0.3%
Nagano	2	Kiyoshi Imai	DPJ	Incumbent re-elected Incumbent retired LDP pickup	Toshimi Kitazawa (DPJ) 38.6% Masatoshi Wakabayashi (LDP) 23.3% Norihisa Yamaguchi (JCP) 18.2% Yukio Nunome (SDP) 10.4% Shin'ichirō Shimojō (I) 6.8% Shigeo Kusama (I) 1.2% Yutaka Tanaka (LL) 1.2% Keisaburō Okuhara (I) 0.3%
Gifu	2 (+1)	Jun'ichi Kasahara	LDP	Incumbent lost re-election Independent pickup (joined DPJ, then LDP)	Iwao Matsuda (I) 25.0% Yasuo Yamashita (DPJ) 22.9% Takeyuki Watanabe (I) 19.6% Jun'ichi Kasahara (LDP) 18.6% Hiroyuki Yamamoto (JCP) 11.7% Yasuhiro Sonoda (LL) 2.3%
Gifu	2 (+1)			1 seat gained by reapportionment DPJ pickup	Iwao Matsuda (I) 25.0% Yasuo Yamashita (DPJ) 22.9% Takeyuki Watanabe (I) 19.6% Jun'ichi Kasahara (LDP) 18.6% Hiroyuki Yamamoto (JCP) 11.7% Yasuhiro Sonoda (LL) 2.3%
Shizuoka	2	Kazuhiko Kimiya	LDP	SDP incumbent retired LDP incumbent lost re-election LDP hold Independent pickup (joined DPJ in '99); Independent gains top tōsen	Tōru Unno (I – DPJ, Komeito, SDP) 32.6% Yoshihiko Yamashita (LDP) 20.9% Kazuhiko Kimiya (LDP) 17.2% Yukihiro Shimazu (JCP) 15.2% Nobuko Iwaki (LP) 8.2% Naoko Hara (LL) 6.0%
Shizuoka	2	Aoki Shinji	SDP	SDP incumbent retired LDP incumbent lost re-election LDP hold Independent pickup (joined DPJ in '99); Independent gains top tōsen	Tōru Unno (I – DPJ, Komeito, SDP) 32.6% Yoshihiko Yamashita (LDP) 20.9% Kazuhiko Kimiya (LDP) 17.2% Yukihiro Shimazu (JCP) 15.2% Nobuko Iwaki (LP) 8.2% Naoko Hara (LL) 6.0%
Aichi	3	Hiroshi Ōki	LDP	LDP incumbent retired LDP incumbent lost re-election 2 DPJ pickups DPJ gains top tōsen	Yoshitake Kimata (DPJ) 17.4% Taisuke Satō (DPJ) 15.9% Hiroko Hatta (JCP) 15.8% Hiroshi Ōki (LDP) 15.5% Yasuoki Urano (LDP) 14.3% Yuzuru Tsuzuki (I) 7.6% Teruko Sugimoto (SDP) 5.5% Hachirō Ishikawa (LP) 3.2% Chieko Igarashi (WP) 1.6% Nobuyuki Watanabe (LL) 1.1% Mikio Yamashita (YLP) 0.8% Yoshiaki Yamazaki (I) 0.4% Takayoshi Itō (I) 0.3% 3 other candidates 0.5%
Aichi	3	Kiyohiro Araki	LDP	LDP incumbent retired LDP incumbent lost re-election 2 DPJ pickups DPJ gains top tōsen	Yoshitake Kimata (DPJ) 17.4% Taisuke Satō (DPJ) 15.9% Hiroko Hatta (JCP) 15.8% Hiroshi Ōki (LDP) 15.5% Yasuoki Urano (LDP) 14.3% Yuzuru Tsuzuki (I) 7.6% Teruko Sugimoto (SDP) 5.5% Hachirō Ishikawa (LP) 3.2% Chieko Igarashi (WP) 1.6% Nobuyuki Watanabe (LL) 1.1% Mikio Yamashita (YLP) 0.8% Yoshiaki Yamazaki (I) 0.4% Takayoshi Itō (I) 0.3% 3 other candidates 0.5%
Aichi	3	Yuzuru Tsuzuki	Independent (later LP)	Independent incumbent lost re-election JCP pickup	Yoshitake Kimata (DPJ) 17.4% Taisuke Satō (DPJ) 15.9% Hiroko Hatta (JCP) 15.8% Hiroshi Ōki (LDP) 15.5% Yasuoki Urano (LDP) 14.3% Yuzuru Tsuzuki (I) 7.6% Teruko Sugimoto (SDP) 5.5% Hachirō Ishikawa (LP) 3.2% Chieko Igarashi (WP) 1.6% Nobuyuki Watanabe (LL) 1.1% Mikio Yamashita (YLP) 0.8% Yoshiaki Yamazaki (I) 0.4% Takayoshi Itō (I) 0.3% 3 other candidates 0.5%
Mie	1	Jūrō Saitō	Independent	Incumbent re-elected	Jūrō Saitō (I) 45.8% Chiaki Takahashi (I) 34.1% Kazuhisa Imai (JCP) 15.5% Noriyasu Sakamoto (LL) 4.6%
Western Japan
District	Seats up	Incumbents	Party	Result	Candidates (Party – endorsements) Vote share
Shiga	1	Eisuke Kawamoto	LDP	Incumbent re-elected	Eisuke Kawamoto (LDP) 46.1% Takashi Ōkubo (I) 28.2% Toshirō Hayashi (JCP) 20.9% Seiichi Katō (LL) 4.8%
Kyōto	2	Yukio Hayashida	LDP	JCP incumbent re-elected LDP incumbent retired Independent pickup (joined DPJ in '99)	Tetsurō Fukuyama (I) 35.5% Tokiko Nishiyama (JCP) 33.9% Naohiko Yamamoto (LDP) 27.8% Takeshi Yotsui (LL) 2.8%
Kyōto	2	Tokiko Nishiyama	JCP	JCP incumbent re-elected LDP incumbent retired Independent pickup (joined DPJ in '99)	Tetsurō Fukuyama (I) 35.5% Tokiko Nishiyama (JCP) 33.9% Naohiko Yamamoto (LDP) 27.8% Takeshi Yotsui (LL) 2.8%
Ōsaka	3	Kiyoshi Nishikawa	Independent (joined IA)	Independent and Komeito incumbents re-elected LDP incumbent lost re-election JCP pickup	Kiyoshi Nishikawa (I) 26.4% Eiichi Yamashita (Komeito) 21.8% Takeshi Miyamoto (JCP) 18.1% Kazutaka Tsuboi (LDP) 14.3% Masahiro Nakatsukasa (DPJ) 13.6% Yumiko Nagasaki (SDP) 2.9% Kazuko Doi (WP) 0.7% Kōji Morimoto (LL) 0.7% Jun'ichi Maeda (NSP) 0.5% Setsuko Ōki (YLP) 0.3% Toshio Nakano (I) 0.2% Yasuo Yamaguchi (I) 0.2% Ryūichi Nakatani (Ishin) 0.1%
Ōsaka	3	Eiichi Yamashita	Komeito	Independent and Komeito incumbents re-elected LDP incumbent lost re-election JCP pickup	Kiyoshi Nishikawa (I) 26.4% Eiichi Yamashita (Komeito) 21.8% Takeshi Miyamoto (JCP) 18.1% Kazutaka Tsuboi (LDP) 14.3% Masahiro Nakatsukasa (DPJ) 13.6% Yumiko Nagasaki (SDP) 2.9% Kazuko Doi (WP) 0.7% Kōji Morimoto (LL) 0.7% Jun'ichi Maeda (NSP) 0.5% Setsuko Ōki (YLP) 0.3% Toshio Nakano (I) 0.2% Yasuo Yamaguchi (I) 0.2% Ryūichi Nakatani (Ishin) 0.1%
Ōsaka	3	Kazutaka Tsuboi	LDP	Independent and Komeito incumbents re-elected LDP incumbent lost re-election JCP pickup	Kiyoshi Nishikawa (I) 26.4% Eiichi Yamashita (Komeito) 21.8% Takeshi Miyamoto (JCP) 18.1% Kazutaka Tsuboi (LDP) 14.3% Masahiro Nakatsukasa (DPJ) 13.6% Yumiko Nagasaki (SDP) 2.9% Kazuko Doi (WP) 0.7% Kōji Morimoto (LL) 0.7% Jun'ichi Maeda (NSP) 0.5% Setsuko Ōki (YLP) 0.3% Toshio Nakano (I) 0.2% Yasuo Yamaguchi (I) 0.2% Ryūichi Nakatani (Ishin) 0.1%
Hyōgo	2 (−1)	Chōji Ashio	LDP	DPJ incumbent re-elected DPJ gains top tōsen	Shōji Motooka (DPJ) 39.0% Tatsumi Ōsawa (JCP) 25.2% Chōji Ashio (LDP) 22.9% Yūzō Nakanishi (NSP) 5.0% Toyoaki Tagawa (LL) 2.5% Yumiko Hiraoka (I) 2.3% Kimura (YLP) 1.7% Genji Shimizu (I) 1.4%
Hyōgo	2 (−1)	Shōji Motooka	DPJ	LDP incumbent lost re-election JCP pickup	Shōji Motooka (DPJ) 39.0% Tatsumi Ōsawa (JCP) 25.2% Chōji Ashio (LDP) 22.9% Yūzō Nakanishi (NSP) 5.0% Toyoaki Tagawa (LL) 2.5% Yumiko Hiraoka (I) 2.3% Kimura (YLP) 1.7% Genji Shimizu (I) 1.4%
Hyōgo	2 (−1)	Kōjin Katakami	Independent (Ex-Komeitotō)	1 seat lost by reapportionment Independent incumbent retired	Shōji Motooka (DPJ) 39.0% Tatsumi Ōsawa (JCP) 25.2% Chōji Ashio (LDP) 22.9% Yūzō Nakanishi (NSP) 5.0% Toyoaki Tagawa (LL) 2.5% Yumiko Hiraoka (I) 2.3% Kimura (YLP) 1.7% Genji Shimizu (I) 1.4%
Nara	1	Minao Hattori	LDP	Incumbent re-elected	Minao Hattori (LDP) 38.3% Kazuyasu Hamaue (I) 31.7% Sachiho Yamamura (JCP) 23.2% Hiroshi Mukai (LL) 6.7%
Wakayama	1	Yōsuke Tsuruho	LP	Incumbent re-elected	Yōsuke Tsuruho (LP) 42.7% Isao Maeda (LDP) 37.9% Yasuhisa Hara (JCP) 17.1% Motonori Kishi (LL) 2.3%
Tottori	1	Shigenobu Sakano	LDP	Incumbent re-elected	Shigenobu Sakano (LDP) 39.9% Kōtarō Tamura (I) 31.6% Tadamiki Matsunaga (SDP) 14.3% Tomoko Ichitani (JCP) 12.8% Yutaka Okino (LL) 1.5%
Shimane	1	Mikio Aoki	LDP	Incumbent re-elected	Mikio Aoki (LDP) 49.9% Setsumi Tamura (DPJ) 27.9% Yōko Sasaki (JCP) 13.0% Katsumi Kanō (SDP) 6.5% Masashi Yamaguchi (LL) 2.8%
Okayama	2	Norifumi Katō	LDP	LDP incumbent re-elected DPJ incumbent lost re-election DPJ hold DPJ gains top tōsen	Satsuki Eda (DPJ) 39.3% Norifumi Katō (LDP) 29.9% Junji Ichii (DPJ) 12.5% Katsunobu Katō (I) 7.9% Yūichi Kakiuchi (JCP) 7.5% Mitsuo Kobiki (SDP) 2.2% Kyōji Nakamura (LL) 0.4% Gō Nakashima (Ishin) 0.3%
Okayama	2	Junji Ichii	DPJ	LDP incumbent re-elected DPJ incumbent lost re-election DPJ hold DPJ gains top tōsen	Satsuki Eda (DPJ) 39.3% Norifumi Katō (LDP) 29.9% Junji Ichii (DPJ) 12.5% Katsunobu Katō (I) 7.9% Yūichi Kakiuchi (JCP) 7.5% Mitsuo Kobiki (SDP) 2.2% Kyōji Nakamura (LL) 0.4% Gō Nakashima (Ishin) 0.3%
Hiroshima	2	Hiroshi Miyazawa	LDP	LDP incumbent retired NSP incumbent lost re-election LDP hold DPJ pickup	Ikuo Kamei (LDP) 27.0% Minoru Yanagida (I) 22.6% Nobuya Okuhara (LDP) 21.9% Akira Ishida (SDP) 9.4% Hiroshi Nikaidō (JCP) 9.1% Kimiko Kurihara (NSP) 7.7% Tomoko (?) Hirasawa (LL) 2.3%
Hiroshima	2	Kimiko Kurihara	NSP	LDP incumbent retired NSP incumbent lost re-election LDP hold DPJ pickup	Ikuo Kamei (LDP) 27.0% Minoru Yanagida (I) 22.6% Nobuya Okuhara (LDP) 21.9% Akira Ishida (SDP) 9.4% Hiroshi Nikaidō (JCP) 9.1% Kimiko Kurihara (NSP) 7.7% Tomoko (?) Hirasawa (LL) 2.3%
Yamaguchi	1	Hideo Futatsugi	LDP	Incumbent retired Independent pickup (joined IA)	Masuo Matsuoka (I) 45.7% Eiichi Gōshi (LDP) 33.8% Hirokazu Fujimoto (JCP) 14.8% Tadao Sasaki (LL) 3.2% Seiichirō Hirata (YLP) 2.5%
Tokushima	1	Kōji Matsuura	LDP	Incumbent lost re-election Independent pickup (joined Green Conf. in '02)	Sekiko Takahashi (I) 45.7% Kōji Matsuura (LDP) 36.8% Hitoshi Fujita (JCP) 11.8% Kazutomo Yano (NSP) 4.5% Takeshi Nara (LL) 1.3%
Kagawa	1	Takushi Hirai	LP	Incumbent retired LDP pickup	Toshio Yamauchi (LDP) 43.5% Shigeaki Katō (SDP) 28.1% Yōko Shirakawa (JCP) 22.4% Kiyotaka Maeda (LL) 5.9%
Ehime	1	Takeshi Noma	LDP	Incumbent re-elected	Takeshi Noma (LDP) 46.9% Mutsumi Hayashi (I) 29.4% Keiko Tanida (JCP) 14.3% Keisuke Hino (LP) 7.4% Makoto Utsunomiya (LL) 2.0%
Kōchi	1	Sadao Hirano	LP	Incumbent retired LDP pickup	Hiroyuki Morishita (LDP) 41.5% Ruriko Nishioka (I) 32.4% Shin'ichirō Nishimura (I) 15.9% Mika Suagahara (LP) 8.4% Takuji Nakamae (LL) 1.8%
Southern Japan
District	Seats up	Incumbents	Party	Result	Candidates (Party – endorsements) Vote share
Fukuoka	2 (−1)	vacant (last held by Kazunobu Yokoo, Komeito)		SDP incumbent retired LDP incumbent re-elected Komeito hold (independent joined Komeitotō)	Kazuo Hirotomo (I) 30.3% Gōtarō Yoshimura (LDP) 27.7% Kazue Fujita (I) 20.0% Toyoomi Tsuno (JCP) 14.4% Yukimi Kamemoto (WP) 2.9% Yoshio Nakamura (YLP) 2.2% Shizuko Tanebe (LL) 1.8% Haruhiko Saitō (I) 0.7%
Fukuoka	2 (−1)	Shirō Watanabe	SDP	SDP incumbent retired LDP incumbent re-elected Komeito hold (independent joined Komeitotō)	Kazuo Hirotomo (I) 30.3% Gōtarō Yoshimura (LDP) 27.7% Kazue Fujita (I) 20.0% Toyoomi Tsuno (JCP) 14.4% Yukimi Kamemoto (WP) 2.9% Yoshio Nakamura (YLP) 2.2% Shizuko Tanebe (LL) 1.8% Haruhiko Saitō (I) 0.7%
Fukuoka	2 (−1)	Gōtarō Yoshimura	LDP	1 seat lost by reapportionment	Kazuo Hirotomo (I) 30.3% Gōtarō Yoshimura (LDP) 27.7% Kazue Fujita (I) 20.0% Toyoomi Tsuno (JCP) 14.4% Yukimi Kamemoto (WP) 2.9% Yoshio Nakamura (YLP) 2.2% Shizuko Tanebe (LL) 1.8% Haruhiko Saitō (I) 0.7%
Saga	1	Hiromi Iwanaga	LDP	Incumbent re-elected	Hiromi Iwanaga (LDP) 47.5% Yōko Kōmoto (I) 34.6% Hideko Tanaka (JCP) 11.8% Yasuhiro Fukagawa (LL) 6.1%
Nagasaki	1	Sōichirō Matsutani	LDP	Incumbent re-elected	Sōichirō Matsutani (LDP) 42.1% Yūji Mitsuno (I) 37.9% Kieko Nishimura (JCP) 13.1% Kazuko Teraoka (LL) 6.9%
Kumamoto	2	Yūshin Morizumi	LDP	Incumbent retired Incumbent lost re-election LDP hold DPJ pickup DPJ gains top tōsen	Ryōichi Honda (DPJ) 34.2% Hitoshi Kimura (LDP) 28.7% Masaru Urata (LDP) 24.8% Etsuko Nishikawa (JCP) 10.0% Kayoko Annaka (LL) 2.3%
Kumamoto	2	Masaru Urata	LDP	Incumbent retired Incumbent lost re-election LDP hold DPJ pickup DPJ gains top tōsen	Ryōichi Honda (DPJ) 34.2% Hitoshi Kimura (LDP) 28.7% Masaru Urata (LDP) 24.8% Etsuko Nishikawa (JCP) 10.0% Kayoko Annaka (LL) 2.3%
Ōita	1	Ban Kugimiya	DPJ	Incumbent lost re-election LDP pickup	Toshiya Nakamichi (LDP) 35.4% Ban Kugimiya (DPJ) 34.3% Fujisaki (SDP) 21.8% Masami Doi (JCP) 7.6% Hideyuki Ozaki (LL) 0.9%
Miyazaki	1	Mitsuhiro Uesugi	LDP	Incumbent re-elected	Mitsuhiro Uesugi (LDP) 66.2% Chika Nagatomo (JCP) 23.4% Kōsaburō Haruta (LL) 10.4%
Kagoshima	2	Kichio Inoue	LDP	LDP incumbent re-elected Independent incumbent lost re-election LDP pickup	Hiroshi Moriyama (LDP) 27.9% Kichio Inoue (LDP) 27.0% Kazuto Kamiyama (I) 26.1% Yūichi Yasuda (LL) 12.2% Mitsuharu Iwaizako (JCP) 6.8%
Kagoshima	2	Kazuto Kamiyama	Independent (ex-JSP)	LDP incumbent re-elected Independent incumbent lost re-election LDP pickup	Hiroshi Moriyama (LDP) 27.9% Kichio Inoue (LDP) 27.0% Kazuto Kamiyama (I) 26.1% Yūichi Yasuda (LL) 12.2% Mitsuharu Iwaizako (JCP) 6.8%
Okinawa	1	Sōkō Shimabuku	Independent	Incumbent re-elected (joined IA)	Sōkō Shimabuku (I) 45.5% Kenjirō Nishida (LDP) 44.5% Hiroshi Kinjō (LL) 8.0% Hiroyuki Kinjō (I) 1.3% Mitsuo Matayoshi (WECP) 0.7%
Nationwide proportional
District	Seats up	Incumbents by party		Result	Party votes/share seats elected candidates
Proportional	50	LDP 17; DPJ 11; Komeito/Ex-Komeitotō 7 SDP/ex-JSP 6 JCP 4 LP 2; 2Club 1 NSP/ex-JSP 1 I/ex-JNP 1		LDP −3; DPJ +1; JCP +4; Komeito 0 LP +3; SDP −2; Others −2; I (ex-JNP) -1	LDP 14,128,719/25.17% → 14 seats: Akito Arima; Masakuni Murakami; Toshisada Oka; Yoshihisa Ōshima; Daizō Nozawa; Issei Anan; Chieko Nōno; Akio Satō; Eisuke Hinode; Tokio Kanō; Tomoko Sasaki; Masashi Waki; Tsuguo Morita; Kimitaka Kuze
Proportional	50	LDP 17; DPJ 11; Komeito/Ex-Komeitotō 7 SDP/ex-JSP 6 JCP 4 LP 2; 2Club 1 NSP/ex-JSP 1 I/ex-JNP 1		LDP −3; DPJ +1; JCP +4; Komeito 0 LP +3; SDP −2; Others −2; I (ex-JNP) -1	DPJ 12,209,685/21.75% → 12 seats: Yōko Komiyama; Kiyoshi Imai; Yoriko Madoka; Mitsuharu Warashina; Masayuki Naoshima; Masamitsu Naitō; Kenji Katsuki; Yukiko Kawahashi; Kiyoshi Hasegawa; Yoshimitsu Takashima; Toshikazu Hori; Takenori Emoto
Proportional	50	LDP 17; DPJ 11; Komeito/Ex-Komeitotō 7 SDP/ex-JSP 6 JCP 4 LP 2; 2Club 1 NSP/ex-JSP 1 I/ex-JNP 1		LDP −3; DPJ +1; JCP +4; Komeito 0 LP +3; SDP −2; Others −2; I (ex-JNP) -1	JCP 8,195,078/14.6% → 8 seats: Hiroshi Tachiki; Tadayoshi Ichida; Emi Iwasa; Yoshinori Yoshioka; Yoshitaka Ikeda; Akira Koike; Toshiko Hayashi; Chikashi Koizumi
Proportional	50	LDP 17; DPJ 11; Komeito/Ex-Komeitotō 7 SDP/ex-JSP 6 JCP 4 LP 2; 2Club 1 NSP/ex-JSP 1 I/ex-JNP 1		LDP −3; DPJ +1; JCP +4; Komeito 0 LP +3; SDP −2; Others −2; I (ex-JNP) -1	Komeito 7,748,301/13.80% → 7 seats: Hiroshi Tsuruoka; Kunihiro Tsuzuki; Kōji Morimoto; Kiyohiro Araki; Hisashi Kazama; Tamaki Sawa; Katsuyuki Hikasa
Proportional	50	LDP 17; DPJ 11; Komeito/Ex-Komeitotō 7 SDP/ex-JSP 6 JCP 4 LP 2; 2Club 1 NSP/ex-JSP 1 I/ex-JNP 1		LDP −3; DPJ +1; JCP +4; Komeito 0 LP +3; SDP −2; Others −2; I (ex-JNP) -1	LP 5,207,813/9.28% → 5 seats: Shin'ya Izumi; Hajimu Irisawa; Sadao Hirano; Hideo Watanabe; Shigeaki Tsukihara
Proportional	50	LDP 17; DPJ 11; Komeito/Ex-Komeitotō 7 SDP/ex-JSP 6 JCP 4 LP 2; 2Club 1 NSP/ex-JSP 1 I/ex-JNP 1		LDP −3; DPJ +1; JCP +4; Komeito 0 LP +3; SDP −2; Others −2; I (ex-JNP) -1	SDP 4,370,763/7.79% → 4 seats: Mizuho Fukushima; Sadao Fuchigami; Masako Ōwaki; Masakazu Yamamoto
Proportional	50	LDP 17; DPJ 11; Komeito/Ex-Komeitotō 7 SDP/ex-JSP 6 JCP 4 LP 2; 2Club 1 NSP/ex-JSP 1 I/ex-JNP 1		LDP −3; DPJ +1; JCP +4; Komeito 0 LP +3; SDP −2; Others −2; I (ex-JNP) -1	Others (aggregate) 3,492,073/6.22%, no seats
Source: The Senkyo and Ministry of Internal Affairs and Communications official results.
