= Nobuo Matsuno =

Japanese politician (born 1951)

- 松野 信夫
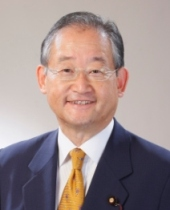
- Official portrait, 2008

Member of the House of Councillors
- In office 29 July 2007 – 28 July 2013
- Preceded by: Issui Miura
- Succeeded by: Seishi Baba
- Constituency: Kumamoto at-large

Member of the House of Representatives
- In office 9 November 2003 – 8 August 2005
- Constituency: Kyushu PR

Personal details
- Born: 2 June 1951 (age 75) Nakano, Tokyo, Japan
- Party: Democratic
- Education: University of Tokyo

Nobuo Matsuno (松野 信夫, Matsuno Nobuo; born 2 June 1951) is a former Japanese politician of the Democratic Party of Japan, who served as a member of the House of Councillors in the Diet (national legislature). A native of Tokyo and graduate of the University of Tokyo, he was elected to the House of Representatives for the first time in 2003 after an unsuccessful run in 2000. After losing the seat in 2005, he was elected to the House of Councillors for the first time in 2007.
