= Eisuke =

- Gender: Male

Origin
- Origin: Japanese
- Meaning: Different meanings depending on the kanji used

Eisuke (written: 永輔, 英輔, 英介, 栄介, 英助 or エイスケ in katakana) is a masculine Japanese given name. Notable people with the name include:

- Eisuke Asakura (朝倉 栄介), Japanese voice actor
- Eisuke Hinode (日出 英輔; 1941–2012), Japanese politician
- Eisuke Mori (森 英介; born 1948), Japanese politician
- Eisuke Nakanishi (中西 永輔; born 1973), Japanese footballer
- Eisuke Nakazono (中薗 英助; 1920–2002), Japanese writer
- Eisuke Takizawa (滝沢 英輔; 1902–1965), Japanese film director
- Eisuke Yoshiyuki (吉行 エイスケ; 1906–1940), Japanese writer

== Fictional characters ==
- Eisuke Wakura, a character from Ultraman Nexus
