= Katsunori Takahashi (politician) =

Japanese politician

- 高橋 克法
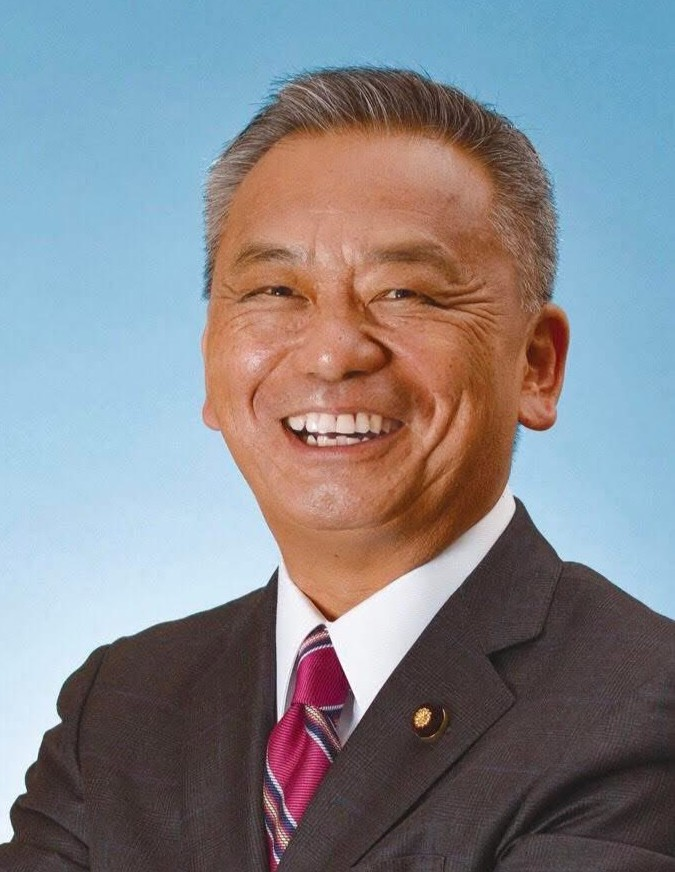
- Official portrait, 2024

Member of the House of Councillors
- Incumbent
- Assumed office 29 July 2013
- Preceded by: Hiroyuki Tani
- Constituency: Tochigi at-large

Mayor of Takanezawa
- In office 2 August 1998 – 21 March 2013
- Preceded by: Yukio Okada
- Succeeded by: Kimihiro Katō

Member of the Tochigi Prefectural Assembly
- In office 1996–1998
- Constituency: Shioya District

Personal details
- Born: 7 December 1957 (age 68) Takanezawa, Shioya District, Tochigi Prefecture, Japan
- Party: Liberal Democratic (Shikōkai)
- Education: Meiji University
- Website: Katsunori Takahashi website

Katsunori Takahashi (高橋 克法, Takahashi Katsunori; born 7 December 1957) is a Japanese politician of the Liberal Democratic Party, who serves as a member of the House of Councillors.

== Early years ==
In 1957, Takahashi was born in Takanezawa, Shioya District, Tochigi Prefecture.

After graduating from Meiji University's Faculty of Law, Takahashi served as a secretary to Junzo Iwasaki, a member of the House of Councillors.

== Political career ==
In 1996, Takahashi ran for the Tochigi Prefectural Assembly and was elected for the first time.

In 2004, he resigned as a member of the Tochigi Prefectural Assembly. he ran for mayor of Takanezawa and was elected.

In March 2013, Takahashi applied for a LDP candidate of Tochigi at-large district in the July House of Councillors election and was nominated by LDP. On March 21, Takahashi resigned as the Mayor of Takanezawa.

In the 2013 House of Councillors election, Takahashi defeated DPJ Incumbent Hiroyuki Tani and was elected for the first time.

In 2017, Takahashi was appointed to Parliamentary Vice-Minister for Land, Infrastructure, Transport and Tourism in the Third Abe Third reshuffled cabinet. After the 2017 general election, Takahashi was re-appointed to Parliamentary Vice-Minister for Land, Infrastructure, Transport and Tourism in the Fourth Abe cabinet.

In the 2019 House of Councillors election, Takahashi defeated CDP’s Chiho Katō and hold the seat.

In the 2024 LDP presidential election, Takahashi endorsed Toshimitsu Motegi as a recommender.

In 2024, Takahashi was appointed to State Minister of Land, Infrastructure, Transport and Tourism, State Minister for Reconstruction, and State Minister of Cabinet Office in the Second Ishiba cabinet.

In the 2025 House of Councillors election, Takahashi defeated CDP’s Yuka Itazu after a close race and hold the seat.

In the 2025 LDP presidential election, Takahashi endorsed Motegi as a recommender again.

In 2025, Takahashi was appointed to State Minister for Internal Affairs and Communications in the First Takaichi cabinet.

In 2026, after the general election, Takahashi was re-appointed to State Minister for Internal Affairs and Communications in the Second Takaichi cabinet.
