= Tomoko Sasaki =

Members of the House of Councillors

- 佐々木 知子
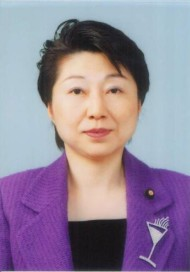

Member of the House of Councillors
- In office 26 July 1998 – 25 July 2004
- Constituency: National PR

Personal details
- Born: 2 March 1955 (age 71) Hiroshima, Japan
- Party: Liberal Democratic
- Education: Kobe University
- Website: http://www.sasaki-law.com/

Tomoko Sasaki (佐々木 知子, Sasaki Tomoko; born 2 March 1955) is a Japanese lawyer, politician, novelist and former prosecutor.

She became a prosecutor in 1983, and worked at the United Nations Asia and Far East Institute for the Prevention of Crime and the Treatment of Offenders from 1993 to 1996.

Elected to the House of Councillors in 1998, Sasaki was engaged in introducing the Stalker Regulation Law of 2000. She served as the director of the Women's Affairs Division of the Liberal Democratic Party. She did not run for the election in 2004, but remains a member of the Party Ethics Committee of the LDP. She is a leading advocate of capital punishment in the party.

She set up a law firm in 2004 and became a professor of law at Teikyo University in 2005.

== As a novelist ==
Sasaki has written some mystery novels under the pen name of Rei Matsuki (松木 麗, Matsuki Rei). She won the Seishi Yokomizo Prize for Koibumi in 1992.
