= Seishi Baba =

Japanese politician

- 馬場 成志
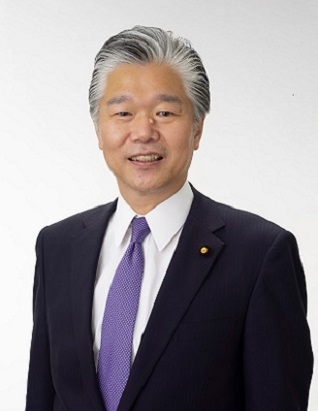
- Official portrait, 2023

Member of the House of Councillors
- Incumbent
- Assumed office 29 July 2013
- Preceded by: Nobuo Matsuno
- Constituency: Kumamoto at-large

Speaker of the Kumamoto Prefectural Assembly
- In office 10 May 2011 – 21 March 2013

Member of the Kumamoto Prefectural Assembly
- In office 1997–2013
- Constituency: Kumamoto City

Member of the Kumamoto City Council
- In office 1991–1997

Personal details
- Born: 30 November 1964 (age 61) Kumamoto City, Kumamoto, Japan
- Party: Liberal Democratic
- Education: Kumamoto Technical High School; Kumamoto Prefectural Industrial Development Youth Corps Training Center

Seishi Baba (born November 30, 1964) is a Japanese politician who is a member of the House of Councillors of Japan.

== Career ==
He was elected in 2013 and re-elected in 2019.
