= Takeyuki Watanabe =

Japanese politician

- 渡辺 猛之
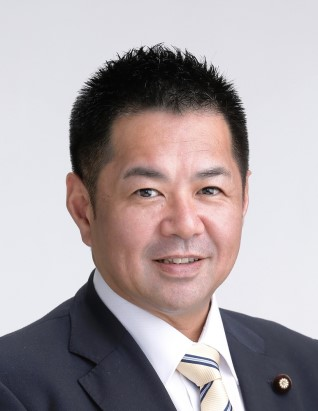
- Official portrait, 2021

Member of the House of Councillors
- Incumbent
- Assumed office 26 July 2010
- Preceded by: Iwao Matsuda
- Constituency: Gifu at-large

Member of the Gifu Prefectural Assembly
- In office 1999–2010
- Constituency: Kamo District
- In office 1995–1998
- Constituency: Kamo District

Personal details
- Born: 18 April 1968 (age 58) Yaotsu, Gifu, Japan
- Party: Liberal Democratic
- Education: Nagoya University

Takeyuki Watanabe (born April 18, 1968, in Gifu Prefecture, Japan) is a Japanese politician who has served as a member of the House of Councillors of Japan since 2010. He represents the Gifu at-large district and is a member of the Liberal Democratic Party.

He is one of three State Ministers for Reconstruction in the Second Kishida Cabinet.
