= Susumu Yanase =

Japanese politician

- 簗瀬 進

Member of the House of Councillors
- In office 26 July 1998 – 25 July 2010
- Preceded by: Itten Kamiyoshihara
- Succeeded by: Seat abolished
- Constituency: Tochigi at-large

Member of the House of Representatives
- In office 19 February 1990 – 27 September 1996
- Preceded by: Kinji Moriyama (1987)
- Succeeded by: Constituency abolished
- Constituency: Tochigi 1st

Member of the Tochigi Prefecture Assembly
- In office 1984–1990

Personal details
- Born: 23 April 1950 (age 76) Utsunomiya, Tochigi, Japan
- Party: Democratic (1998–2016)
- Other political affiliations: LDP (1984–1993); NPS (1993–1996); DP 1996 (1996–1998); DP 2016 (2016–2018)
- Education: Tohoku University

Susumu Yanase (簗瀬 進, Yanase Susumu; born 23 April 1950) is a Japanese politician of the Democratic Party of Japan, a member of the House of Councillors in the Diet (national legislature).

== Early life ==
Yanase is a native of Utsunomiya, Tochigi and a graduate of Tohoku University, before his election to the Tochigi Prefectural Assembly, he worked for the government of Tochigi Prefecture.

== Political career ==
Yanase was elected to the Tochigi Prefectural Assembly for the first time in 1984.

In 1990 he was elected to the House of Representatives for the first time, but then lost the seat in 1996.

In 1998 he was elected to the House of Councillors for the first time, serving until 2010.

House of Councillors
| Preceded by Itten Kamiyoshihara; Tetsurō Yano | Councillor for Tochigi; 1998–2010; Served alongside: Tetsurō Yano | Succeeded by Michiko Ueno |
House of Representatives (Japan)
| Preceded by Michio Watanabe; Hajime Funada; Hidekichi Hirose; Seiichi Inaba; Kinji Moriyama | Representative for Tochigi's 1st district (multi-member); 1990–1996; Served alongside: Michio Watanabe, Mamoru Kobayashi, Hajime Funada, Susumu Yasuda, Susumu Hasumi | District eliminated |
