= Tsuyako Ōno =

Japanese politician

- 大野 つや子
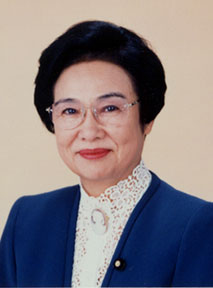
- Official portrait, 2001

Member of the House of Councillors
- In office 24 March 1996 – 28 July 2007
- Preceded by: Akira Ōno
- Succeeded by: Takao Fujii
- Constituency: Gifu at-large

Personal details
- Born: 27 February 1934 Tokyo, Japan
- Died: 26 January 2021 (aged 86) Tokyo, Japan
- Party: Liberal Democratic
- Spouse: Akira Ōno (m. 1956; died 1996)
- Children: Yasutada Ōno
- Relatives: Banboku Ōno (father-in-law)
- Education: Konodai Girls' School

Tsuyako Ōno (February 27, 1934 - January 26, 2021) was a Japanese politician who served two terms in the House of Councillors from 1996 to 2006. Her son was elected to the same legislative body in 2013.

In 1996, Ōno was elected to fill her husband's seat in the Upper House, on behalf of the Liberal Democratic Party; the seat represented Gifu Prefecture. She won the 2001 election for the same district.
