= Masaru Urata =

Japanese politician (1925–2026)

- 浦田勝

Member of the House of Councillors for the Kumamoto at-large district
- In office 26 July 1992 – 25 July 1998
- In office 10 July 1983 – 9 July 1989

Personal details
- Born: 20 June 1925 Taimei, Japan
- Died: 5 March 2026 (aged 100) Tamana, Japan
- Party: LDP
- Education: Nihon University
- Occupation: Flight cadet

Masaru Urata (Japanese: 浦田勝 Urata Masaru; 20 June 1925 – 5 March 2026) was a Japanese politician. A member of the Liberal Democratic Party, he served in the House of Councillors from 1983 to 1989 and again from 1992 to 1998.

Urata died in Tamana on 5 March 2026, at the age of 100.
