= Yasutada Ōno =

Japanese politician

- 大野 泰正
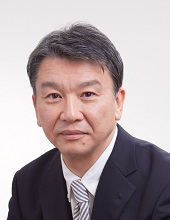
- Official portrait, 2013

Member of the House of Councillors
- In office 29 July 2013 – 28 July 2025
- Preceded by: Takao Fujii
- Succeeded by: Atsuko Wakai
- Constituency: Gifu at-large

Member of the Gifu Prefectural Assembly
- In office 30 April 2003 – 2013
- Constituency: Hashima City

Personal details
- Born: 31 May 1959 (age 67) Yamagata, Gifu, Japan
- Party: Independent (since 2024)
- Other political affiliations: LDP (before 2024)
- Parent: Tsuyako Ōno (mother)
- Relatives: Banboku Ōno (grandfather)
- Education: Keio University

Yasutada Ōno is a Japanese politician serving as a member of the House of Councillors since 2013. He was a member of the Liberal Democratic Party until 2024, having resigned following an indictment during the 2023–2024 Japanese slush fund scandal.

== Biography ==
He graduated from Keio University school of Law and worked for Air Nippon Network. He was elected in 2013 and 2019.

On January 19, 2024, he was indicted on suspicion of violating the Political Funds Control Act and left the Liberal Democratic Party.
