= Tochigi at-large district =

Japanese House of Councillors constituency

- 栃木県選挙区
- Parliamentary constituency for the House of Councillors
- Prefecture: Tochigi
- Electorate: 1,587,957 (as of July 2025)

Current constituency
- Created: 1947
- Seats: 2
- Councillors: Class of 2028: Michiko Ueno (LDP); Class of 2031: Katsunori Takahashi (LDP)

Tochigi At-Large District (栃木県選挙区, Tochigi-ken Senkyoku) is a multi-member district of the House of Councillors in the Diet of Japan (national legislature). It consists of Tochigi Prefecture and elects two Councillors, one per election.

Between 1947 and 2007 Tochigi was represented by four councillors, elected two at a time by single non-transferable vote. Like many two-member districts Tochigi often split seats between the two major postwar parties: the Liberal Democratic Party (LDP) and the Japan Socialist Party (JSP). In the 1965 election, left-wing Socialist incumbent Takeshi Tokano finished only third behind two LDP candidates while another Socialist candidate, Takashi Hagiwara, received almost as many votes as Tokano. In 1968, the LDP could repeat this success against incumbent Socialist Seiichi Inaba who finished only fourth behind Tokano, this time running as an independent. In the following election of 1971 Tokano returned as a Socialist candidate to his seat with the highest vote; and Seiichi Inaba became a Socialist Member of the House of Representatives where he was a member of the special committee investigating the Lockheed scandal.

In the election of 1974, two independents, one DSP and one Kōmeitō candidate joined the traditional field of LDP, JSP and JCP candidates. Turnout jumped to 74% and independent Takaji Ōshima beat out LDP incumbent Yano for second place, but subsequently joined the LDP himself. Six years later, the leftist vote was still split among one Socialist, one Democratic Socialist and one Communist while there were only two LDP candidates on the conservative side: Once again, the party gained two Tochigi seats in one election. They held onto those seats until the 1990s when the declining JSP collapsed during the party's participation in a LDP government and was ultimately replaced by the Democratic Party of Japan as the largest opposition party.

== Current Councillors ==
Since the 2010 House of Councillors election, the district has been represented in the House of Councillors by 2 Councillors, with one Councillor being up for election every 3 years.

As of 26 February 2026, the Councillors currently representing this district are as follows:

- Michiko Ueno (LDP) - Class of 2028
- Katsunori Takahashi (LDP) - Class of 2031

Since the 2013 House of Councillors election, the district has only been represented by members of the Liberal Democratic Party.

== Elected Councillors ==
Class of 1947		Election year	Class of 1950	
#1 (1947: #1, 6-year term)	#2 (1947: #2, 6-year term)	Election year	#1 (1947: #3, 3-year term)	#2 (1947: #4, 3-year term)
Sadakichi Ōshima (DP)	Shōzaburō Iwasaki (JSP)	1947	Risuke Tonooka (DP)	Haruhiko Uetake (Indep.)
Sadakichi Ōshima (DP)	Shōzaburō Iwasaki (JSP)	1947 by-el.	Kikuji Okada (DP)	Haruhiko Uetake (Indep.)
Sadakichi Ōshima (DP)	Shōzaburō Iwasaki (JSP)	1950	Sukeji Sōma (JSP)	Haruhiko Uetake (LP)
Takeshi Tokano (JSP, left)	Seiichirō Satō (Yoshida LP)	1953	Sukeji Sōma (JSP)	Haruhiko Uetake (LP)
Takeshi Tokano (JSP, left)	Seiichirō Satō (Yoshida LP)	1956	Sukeji Sōma (JSP)	Haruhiko Uetake (LDP)
Takeshi Tokano (JSP)	Michio Yuzawa (LDP)	1959	Sukeji Sōma (JSP)	Haruhiko Uetake (LDP)
Takeshi Tokano (JSP)	Michio Yuzawa (LDP)	1962	Haruhiko Uetake (LDP)	Seiichi Inaba (JSP)
Takeshi Tokano (JSP)	Tokuya Tsuboyama (LDP)	1963 by-el.	Haruhiko Uetake (LDP)	Seiichi Inaba (JSP)
Yuzuru Funada (LDP)	Kensaku Tamura (LDP)	1965	Haruhiko Uetake (LDP)	Seiichi Inaba (JSP)
Yuzuru Funada (LDP)	Kensaku Tamura (LDP)	1968	Haruhiko Uetake (LDP)	Noboru Yano (LDP)
Takeshi Tokano (JSP)	Yuzuru Funada (LDP)	1971	Haruhiko Uetake (LDP)	Noboru Yano (LDP)
Takeshi Tokano (JSP)	Yuzuru Funada (LDP)	1974	Takashi Ōtsuka (JSP)	Tomoji Ōshima (Indep.)
Takeshi Tokano (JSP)	Noboru Yano (LDP)	1974 by-el.	Takashi Ōtsuka (JSP)	Tomoji Ōshima (Indep.)
Junzō Iwasaki (LDP)	Takeshi Tokano (JSP)	1977	Takashi Ōtsuka (JSP)	Tomoji Ōshima (Indep.)
Junzō Iwasaki (LDP)	Takeshi Tokano (JSP)	1980	Mayumi Moriyama (LDP)	Tomoji Ōshima (LDP)
Junzō Iwasaki (LDP)	Yūbun Ueno (JSP)	1983 by-el.	Mayumi Moriyama (LDP)	Tomoji Ōshima (LDP)
Yūbun Ueno (JSP)	Junzō Iwasaki (LDP)	1983	Mayumi Moriyama (LDP)	Tomoji Ōshima (LDP)
Yūbun Ueno (JSP)	Junzō Iwasaki (LDP)	1986	Mayumi Moriyama (LDP)	Tomoji Ōshima (LDP)
Yūbun Ueno (JSP)	Junzō Iwasaki (LDP)	1989	Mayumi Moriyama (LDP)	Tomoji Ōshima (LDP)
Yūbun Ueno (JSP)	Junzō Iwasaki (LDP)	1992	Mayumi Moriyama (LDP)	Tetsurō Yano (LDP)
Junzō Iwasaki (LDP)	Masayuki Kunii (DRP)	1995	Mayumi Moriyama (LDP)	Tetsurō Yano (LDP)
Junzō Iwasaki (LDP)	Masayuki Kunii (DRP)	1996 by-el.	Itten Kamiyoshihara (LDP)	Tetsurō Yano (LDP)
Junzō Iwasaki (LDP)	Masayuki Kunii (DRP)	1998	Susumu Yanase (DPJ)	Tetsurō Yano (LDP)
Masayuki Kunii (LDP)	Hiroyuki Tani (DPJ)	2001	Susumu Yanase (DPJ)	Tetsurō Yano (LDP)
Masayuki Kunii (LDP)	Hiroyuki Tani (DPJ)	2004	Susumu Yanase (DPJ)	Tetsurō Yano (LDP)
Hiroyuki Tani (DPJ)	–	2007	Susumu Yanase (DPJ)	Tetsurō Yano (LDP)
Hiroyuki Tani (DPJ)	–	2010	Michiko Ueno (LDP)	–
Katsunori Takahashi (LDP)	–	2013	Michiko Ueno (LDP)	–
Katsunori Takahashi (LDP)	–	2016	Michiko Ueno (LDP)	–
Katsunori Takahashi (LDP)	–	2019	Michiko Ueno (LDP)	–
Katsunori Takahashi (LDP)	–	2022	Michiko Ueno (LDP)	–
Katsunori Takahashi (LDP)	–	2025	Michiko Ueno (LDP)	–

== Election results ==
=== Elections in the 2020s ===
2025
Party	Candidate	Votes	%	±%
LDP	Katsunori Takahashi (Incumbent)	301,373	36.7	▼16.8
CDP	Yuka Itazu	266,042	32.4	New
Sanseito	Noriaki Ōmori	181,620	22.1	New
JCP	Michio Fukuda	38,102	4.6	New
Independent	Shin'ichirō Kasama	18,715	2.3	New
Anti-NHK	Masako Takahashi	16,071	2.0	▼0.6
Registered electors		1,587,957		
Majority		35,331	4.3	▼8.2
Turnout			53.6	▲9.5
LDP hold		Swing		

2022
Party	Candidate	Votes	%	±%
LDP	Michiko Ueno (Incumbent) (Endorsed by Komeito)	414,456	56.2	▼2.7
CDP	Kyo Itakura	127,628	17.3	New
Ishin	Hiromi Okubo	100,529	13.6	New
JCP	Keiko Okamura	44,310	6.0	New
Sanseitō	Hirosato Okuma	30,864	4.2	New
Anti-NHK	Masako Takahashi	19,090	2.6	New
Registered electors		1,620,720		
Majority		286,828	38.9	
Turnout		761,414	47.0	▼4.4
LDP hold		Swing		

=== Elections in the 2010s ===
2019
Party	Candidate	Votes	%	±%
LDP	Katsunori Takahashi (Incumbent) (Endorsed by Komeito)	373,099	53.5	▼5.4
CDP	Kato Chiho (Endorsed by the DPP, SDP and the JCP)	285,681	41.0	New
Anti-NHK	Norimitsu Machida	38,508	5.5	New
Registered electors		1,634,678		
Majority		87,418	12.5	▼9.8
Turnout		721,383	44.1	▼5.6
LDP hold		Swing		

2016
Party	Candidate	Votes	%	±%
LDP	Michiko Ueno (Incumbent)	484,300	58.9	▲22.7
Independent	Takao Tanobe (Endorsed by the DPJ, JCP, SDP and the Liberal Party)	314,401	38.3	New
Happiness Realization	Misaki Akemi	23,262	2.8	New
Registered electors		1,653,308		
Majority		169,899	20.6	▲20.0
Turnout		849,470	51.4	▼5.2
LDP hold		Swing		

2013
Party	Candidate	Votes	%	±%
LDP	Katsunori Takahashi	376,553	48.1	▲6.7
Your	Tomoki Oki	201,895	25.8	New
Democratic	Hiroyuki Tani (Incumbent)	158,577	20.3	▼33.6
JCP	Kazunori Koike	41,351	5.3	▲0.6
Happiness Realization	Mitsuharu Suhiura	4,371	0.6	New
Registered electors		1,625,367		
Majority		174,658	22.3	
Turnout		807,645	49.7	▼7.0
LDP gain from Democratic		Swing		

2010
Party	Candidate	Votes	%	±%
LDP	Michiko Ueno	324,790	36.2	▼5.9
Democratic	Susumu Yanase (Incumbent)	319,898	35.6	▼13.6
Your	Daiki Araki	224,529	25.0	New
JCP	Kazunori Koike	28,617	3.2	▼5.5
Registered electors		1,630,549		
Majority		4,892	1.6	New
Turnout		922,728	56.6	▲5.6
LDP gain from Democratic		Swing		
LDP loss (seat eliminated)				

=== Elections in the 2000s ===
2007
Party	Candidate	Votes	%	±%
Democratic	Hiroyuki Tani (Incumbent)	484,900	53.9	▲25.9
LDP	Masayuki Kuni (Incumbent)	372,930	41.4	▲2.8
JCP	Kazunori Koike	42,335	4.7	▼0.8
Registered electors		1,624,325		
Majority		111,970	12.5	▲1.9
Turnout		920,343	56.7	▲2.8
Democratic gain from LDP		Swing		
Democratic loss (seat eliminated)				

2004
Party	Candidate	Votes	%	±%
Democratic	Susumu Yanase (Incumbent)	388,356	49.2	▲9.5
LDP	Tetsuro Yano (Incumbent)	332,513	42.1	▲17.4
JCP	Setsuko Nomura	69,044	8.7	▲0.4
Registered electors		1,605,279		
Turnout		818,532	51.0	Unknown
Democratic hold		Swing		
LDP hold		Swing		
