= Takao Fujii =

Japanese politician (1943–2026)

- 藤井 孝男
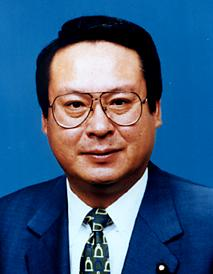
- Official portrait, 1997

Minister of Transport
- In office 11 September 1997 – 30 July 1998
- Prime Minister: Ryutaro Hashimoto
- Preceded by: Makoto Koga
- Succeeded by: Jiro Kawasaki

Member of the House of Representatives
- In office 21 December 2012 – 21 November 2014
- Constituency: Tōkai PR
- In office 19 July 1993 – 8 August 2005
- Preceded by: Eiichi Watanabe
- Succeeded by: Kazuyoshi Kaneko
- Constituency: Gifu 2nd (1993–1996); Gifu 4th (1996–2000); Tōkai PR (2000–2003); Gifu 4th (2003–2005)

Member of the House of Councillors
- In office 29 July 2007 – 4 December 2012
- Preceded by: Tsuyako Ōno
- Succeeded by: Yasutada Ōno
- Constituency: Gifu at-large
- In office 1 February 1981 – 18 June 1993
- Preceded by: Heigo Fujii
- Succeeded by: Junichi Kasahara
- Constituency: Gifu at-large

Personal details
- Born: 14 March 1943 Tokyo, Japan
- Died: 13 April 2026 (aged 83)
- Party: LDP (1981–2005; 2007–2010; 2016–present)
- Other political affiliations: Independent (2005–2007); Sunrise (2010–2012); JRP (2012–2014); PFG (2014–2016)
- Children: 2
- Education: Seijo University

Takao Fujii (藤井 孝男, Fujii Takao; 14 March 1943 – 13 April 2026) was a Japanese politician, who was an independent member of the House of Councillors in the Diet (national legislature).

== Early life and education ==
Fuji was a native of Shirakawa, Gifu and graduated from Seijo University.

== Political career ==
Fujii was elected to the House of Councillors for the first time in 1981 as a member of the Liberal Democratic Party. After serving in the House of Representatives for four terms from 1993 until 2005 when he lost re-election, he was elected again to the House of Councillors in 2007.

He joined the Sunrise Party of Japan on April 10, 2010. In 2012 that party merged with another party to become the Japan Restoration Party. In 2014 the former Sunrise Party members, led by Shintaro Ishihara and including Fujii, split from the Restoration Party to form the Party for Future Generations. He was appointed the inaugural chairman of the party's executive council and also head of the party's electoral strategy committee. In the December 2014 general election he was the party's candidate for the Tokai proportional block but lost his seat. After the election he replaced Hiroyuki Sonoda as an advisor to the party.

In September 2015 he left the Party for Future Generations and submitted an application to the Gifu Prefecture branch of the Liberal Democratic Party and was granted re-entry to the party.

== Death ==
Fujii died from a heart attack on 13 April 2026, at the age of 83.

== Sources ==
- 政治家情報 〜藤井 孝男〜. ザ･選挙 (in Japanese). JANJAN. Archived from the original on 2007-12-01.
