= Atsuko Shimoda =

Japanese politician

- 下田 敦子

Member of the House of Councillors
- In office 26 July 2004 – 25 July 2010
- Constituency: National PR

Member of the Aomori Prefectural Assembly
- In office 1991–2003
- Constituency: Hirosaki City

Personal details
- Born: 5 August 1940 (age 86) Hirosaki, Aomori, Japan
- Party: Democratic
- Other political affiliations: Independent (1991–2004)
- Education: Akita Nutrition Junior College

Atsuko Shimoda (下田 敦子, Shimoda Atsuko; born August 5, 1940) is a Japanese politician of the Democratic Party of Japan, a member of the House of Councillors in the Diet (national legislature). A native of Hirosaki, Aomori and graduate of Akita Junior College (now Akita Eiyo Junior College), she was elected to the House of Councillors for the first time in 2004 after serving in the city assembly of Hirosaki for three terms.
