= Ryoichi Honda =

Japanese politician (1940–2022)

Member of the House of Councillors of Japan
- In office 1998–2004
- Constituency: Kumamoto at-large district

Member of the Kumamoto Prefectural Assembly
- In office 1987–1998

Member of the Kumamoto City Assembly
- In office 1979–1987

Personal details
- Born: 24 April 1940 Kumamoto Prefecture, Japan
- Died: 22 July 2022 (aged 82)
- Party: JSP; SDP; Democratic Party of Japan; Your Party
- Education: University of Kitakyushu

Ryoichi Honda (Japanese: 本田良一, Hepburn: Honda Ryōichi; 24 April 1940 – 22 July 2022) was a Japanese politician. A member of the Democratic Party of Japan, he served in the House of Councillors from 1998 to 2004.

Honda died on 22 July 2022, at the age of 82.
