= Gifu at-large district =

Japan House of Councillors constituency

- 岐阜県選挙区
- Parliamentary constituency for the House of Councillors
- Prefecture: Gifu
- Electorate: 1,633,395 (as of September 2022)

Current constituency
- Created: 1947
- Seats: 2
- Councillors: Class of 2019: Yasutada Ōno (LDP); Class of 2022: Takeyuki Watanabe (LDP)

The Gifu at-large district (Japanese: 岐阜県選挙区, Hepburn: Gifu-ken senkyoku) is a constituency that represents Gifu Prefecture in the House of Councillors in the Diet of Japan. It currently has three Councillors in the 242-member house.

== Outline ==
From the first House of Councillors election in 1947 until the 1992 election, Gifu elected two Councillors to six-year terms at alternating elections held every three years. Electoral reform in 1994 increased Gifu's representation to four Councillors, which began to take effect at the 1992 election, at which two Councillors were elected.

In September 2012 Gifu had 1,684,766 registered voters, the second-lowest of the 12 prefectures that were represented by 4 Councillors at that time. By comparison, the three most populous districts of Hokkaido, Hyogo at-large district and Fukuoka districts each had more than 4 million voters but were also represented by four Councillors each. To address this malapportionment, a November 2012 amendment to the Public Offices Election Law reduced Gifu's representation (along with Fukushima's) representation to two Councillors. This change began to take effect at the 2013 election, when only one Councillor was elected in Gifu, and will be completed at the 2016 election. The district has 1,666,610 registered voters as of September 2015.

The Councillors currently representing Fukushima are:

- Takeyuki Watanabe (Liberal Democratic Party (LDP), first term; term ends in 2016)
- Yoshiharu Komiyama (Democratic Party of Japan (DPJ), first term; term ends in 2016)
- Yasutada Ohno (LDP, first term; term ends in 2019)

== Elected Councillors ==
Note: Party listed is at the time of election

class of 1947		election year	class of 1950	
#2	#1 (1947: 6-year term)	election year	#1 (1947: 3-year term)	#2
-	Osamu Ito (Social Democratic)	1947	Jinkichi Watanabe (Ind.)	-
-	Osamu Ito (Social Democratic)	1950	Shinzo Koike (Liberal)	-
-	Keiichi Tanaka (Liberal)	1953	Shinzo Koike (Liberal)	-
-	Keiichi Tanaka (Liberal)	1956	Shinzo Koike (LDP)	-
-	Keiichi Tanaka (LDP)	1959	Shinzo Koike (LDP)	-
-	Keiichi Tanaka (LDP)	1962	Shinzo Koike (LDP)	-
-	Namio Nakamura (Social Democratic) (Note: Resigned 12 January 1977)	1965	Shinzo Koike (LDP)	-
-	Namio Nakamura (Social Democratic)	1968	Shinzo Koike (LDP)	-
-	Namio Nakamura (Social Democratic)	1971	Shinzo Koike (LDP)	-
-	Namio Nakamura (Social Democratic)	1974	Heigo Fujii (LDP) (Note: Died in office 14 December 1980)	-
-	Hiromu Asano (LDP) (Note: Died in office 15 May 1981)	1977	Heigo Fujii (LDP)	-
-	Hiromu Asano (LDP)	1980	Heigo Fujii (LDP)	-
-	Hiromu Asano (LDP)	Feb. 1981 by-election (Note: Held 1 February 1981)	Takao Fujii (LDP) (Note: Resigned 18 June 1993)	-
-	Reijo Sugiyama (LDP)	June 1981 by-election (Note: Held 28 June 1981)	Takao Fujii (LDP)	-
-	Reijo Sugiyama (LDP)	1983	Takao Fujii (LDP)	-
-	Reijo Sugiyama (LDP)	1986	Takao Fujii (LDP)	-
-	Kazunobu Takai (Rengō no Kai) (Note: Resigned 21 June 1993)	1989	Takao Fujii (LDP)	-
-	Kazunobu Takai (Rengō no Kai)	1992	Takao Fujii (LDP)	-
-	Shoya Iwasaki (Social Democratic)	1993 by-election (Note: Held 18 July 1993)	Junichi Kasahara (LDP)	-
Kenji Hirata (New Frontier)	Akira Ohno (LDP) (Note: Died in office 5 February 1996)	1995	Junichi Kasahara (LDP)	-
Kenji Hirata (New Frontier)	Tsuyako Ōno (Ind.)	1996 by-election (Note: Held 24 March 1996)	Junichi Kasahara (LDP)	-
Kenji Hirata (New Frontier)	Tsuyako Ōno (Ind.)	1998	Iwada Matsuo (Ind.)	Yasuo Yamashita (DPJ)
Kenji Hirata (DPJ)	Tsuyako Ōno (LDP)	2001	Iwada Matsuo (Ind.)	Yasuo Yamashita (DPJ)
Kenji Hirata (DPJ)	Tsuyako Ōno (LDP)	2004	Iwao Matsuda (LDP)	Yasuo Yamashita (DPJ)
Kenji Hirata (DPJ)	Takao Fujii (Ind.)	2007	Iwao Matsuda (LDP)	Yasuo Yamashita (DPJ)
Kenji Hirata (DPJ)	Takao Fujii (Ind.)	2010	Takeyuki Watanabe (LDP)	Yoshiharu Komiyama (DPJ)
Seat abolished	Yasutada Ōno (LDP)	2013	Takeyuki Watanabe (LDP)	Yoshiharu Komiyama (DPJ)

== Election results ==
2022
Party	Candidate	Votes	%	±%
LDP	Takeyuki Watanabe (Incumbent) (Endorsed by Komeito)	452,085	52.81%	▼2.97
DPP	Midori Tanno	257,852	30.12%	New
JCP	Keiji Mio	74,072	8.65%	New
Sanseito	Megumi Hiroe	49,350	5.77%	New
Anti-NHK	Masahiko Sakamoto	22,648	2.65%	▼4.83
Turnout		856,007	53.59%	▲2.59

2019
Party	Candidate	Votes	%	±%
LDP	Yasutada Ōno (Incumbent) (Endorsed by Komeito)	467,309	56.39%	▼2.36
CDP	Shinichi Umemura (Endorsed by the SDP, DPP, and JCP)	299,463	36.13%	New
Anti-NHK	Masahiko Sakamoto	61,975	7.48%	New
Turnout		828,747	51.00%	▼6.74

2016
Party	Candidate	Votes	%	±%
LDP	Takeyuki Watanabe (Incumbent) (Endorsed by Komeito)	467,309	56.39%	▲12.39
Democratic	Yoshiharu Komiyama (Incumbent)	389,681	40.90%	▲17.20
Happiness Realization	Yukihiko Kano	31,651	3.32%	New
Turnout		888,641	57.74%	▲4.77

2013
Party	Candidate	Votes	%	±%
LDP	Yasutada Ohno (Endorsed by Komeito)	500,580	58.8	
Democratic	Rie Yoshida	218,074	25.6	
JCP	Masanori Suzuki	115,503	13.6	
Happiness Realization	Yukihiko Kano	17,893	2.1	
Turnout				

2010
Party	Candidate	Votes	%	±%
LDP	Takeyuki Watanabe (Endorsed by Sunrise Party)	425,594	44.0	
Democratic	Yoshiharu Komiyama (Endorsed by People's New Party)	229,225	23.7	
Democratic	Yasuo Yamashita (Endorsed by People's New Party)	221,343	22.9	
JCP	Masanori Suzuki	73,031	7.5	
Happiness Realization	Yukihiko Kano	18,138	1.9	
Turnout				

2007
Party	Candidate	Votes	%	±%
	Takao Fujii (Endorsed by LDP, Komeito)	466,008	46.1	
Democratic	Kenji Hirata	445,489	44.1	
JCP	Takao Kato	99,301	9.8	
Turnout				

2004
Party	Candidate	Votes	%	±%
LDP	Iwao Matsuda (endorsed by Komeito)	428,988	44.5	
Democratic	Yasuo Yamashita	422,235	43.8	
JCP	Takao Kato	112,882	11.7	
Turnout				

== See also ==
- List of districts of the House of Councillors of Japan
- Gifu 1st district, one of Gifu Prefecture's five districts in the House of Representatives
