= Akita Nutrition Junior College =

Higher education institution in Akita Prefecture, Japan

Coordinates: 39°42′57.9″N 140°9′23.8″E

- 秋田栄養短期大学
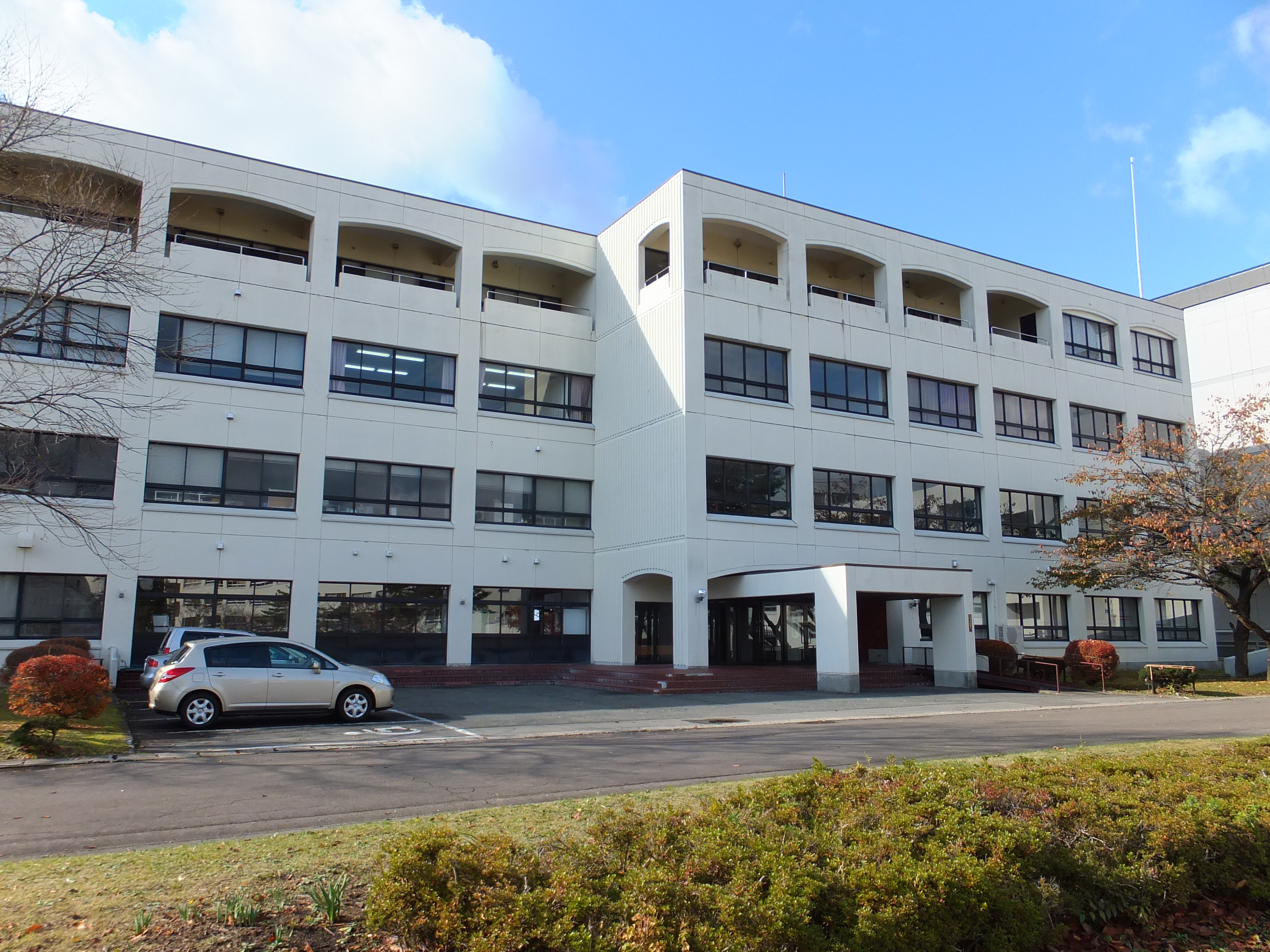
- Motto: "truth harmonization and practical science"
- Type: private
- Established: 1953
- Location: Akita, Akita, Japan

Akita Nutrition Junior College (秋田栄養短期大学, Akita Eiyo Tanki Daigaku) is a private university at Akita, Akita, Japan, founded in 1953.

== History ==
The college was founded as Akita Junior College, with departments of economics and commerce. A department of home economics was added in 1954. The college was relocated to its present location in 1983. A nutrition department was added in 1990. The college was renamed the Akita Economics Junior College in 1997 and its curriculum restructured around three departments: Commerce and Economics, Information Science and Lifestyle. It was renamed the Akita Nutrition Junior College in 2005, specializing in a Department of Nutrition only.
