= Toshikazu Hori =

Japanese engineer

Toshikazu Hori is an electrical engineer at the University of Fukui, Japan. He was named a Fellow of the Institute of Electrical and Electronics Engineers (IEEE) in 2015 for his contributions to broadband antennae for cellular and satellite communications.
