= Toru Matsuoka =

Japanese politician

- 松岡 徹

Member of the House of Councillors
- In office 26 July 2004 – 25 July 2010
- Constituency: National PR

Member of the Osaka City Council
- In office 1991–2003

Personal details
- Born: 26 November 1951 (age 74) Nishinari, Osaka, Japan
- Party: Democratic
- Other political affiliations: Socialist (1991–1996)

Toru Matsuoka (松岡 徹, Matsuoka Tōru; born November 26, 1951) is a Japanese politician of the Democratic Party of Japan, a member of the House of Councillors in the Diet (national legislature). A native of Osaka, Osaka and high school graduate, he was elected to the House of Councillors for the first time in 2004 after serving in the assembly of Osaka Prefecture for three terms since 1991.
