= Hitoshi Kimura =

Japanese politician (1934–2023)

- 木村 仁
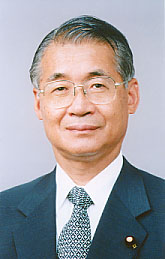
- Official portrait, 2001

Member of the House of Councillors
- In office 26 July 1998 – 25 July 2010
- Preceded by: Yūshin Morizumi
- Succeeded by: Yoshifumi Matsumura
- Constituency: Kumamoto at-large

Personal details
- Born: 24 June 1934 Kumamoto Prefecture, Japan
- Died: 15 November 2023 (aged 89) Kawasaki, Kanagawa, Japan
- Party: Liberal Democratic
- Education: University of Tokyo

Hitoshi Kimura (木村 仁, Kimura Hitoshi; 24 June 1934 – 15 November 2023) was a Japanese politician of the Liberal Democratic Party, a member of the House of Councillors in the Diet (national legislature). A native of Kumamoto Prefecture and graduate of the University of Tokyo, he worked at the Ministry of Home Affairs from 1958 to 1991. After teaching, he was elected to the House of Councillors for the first time in 1998.

Kimura died in Tokyo on 15 November 2023, at the age of 89.
