= Sohei Nihi =

Japanese politician

- 仁比 聡平
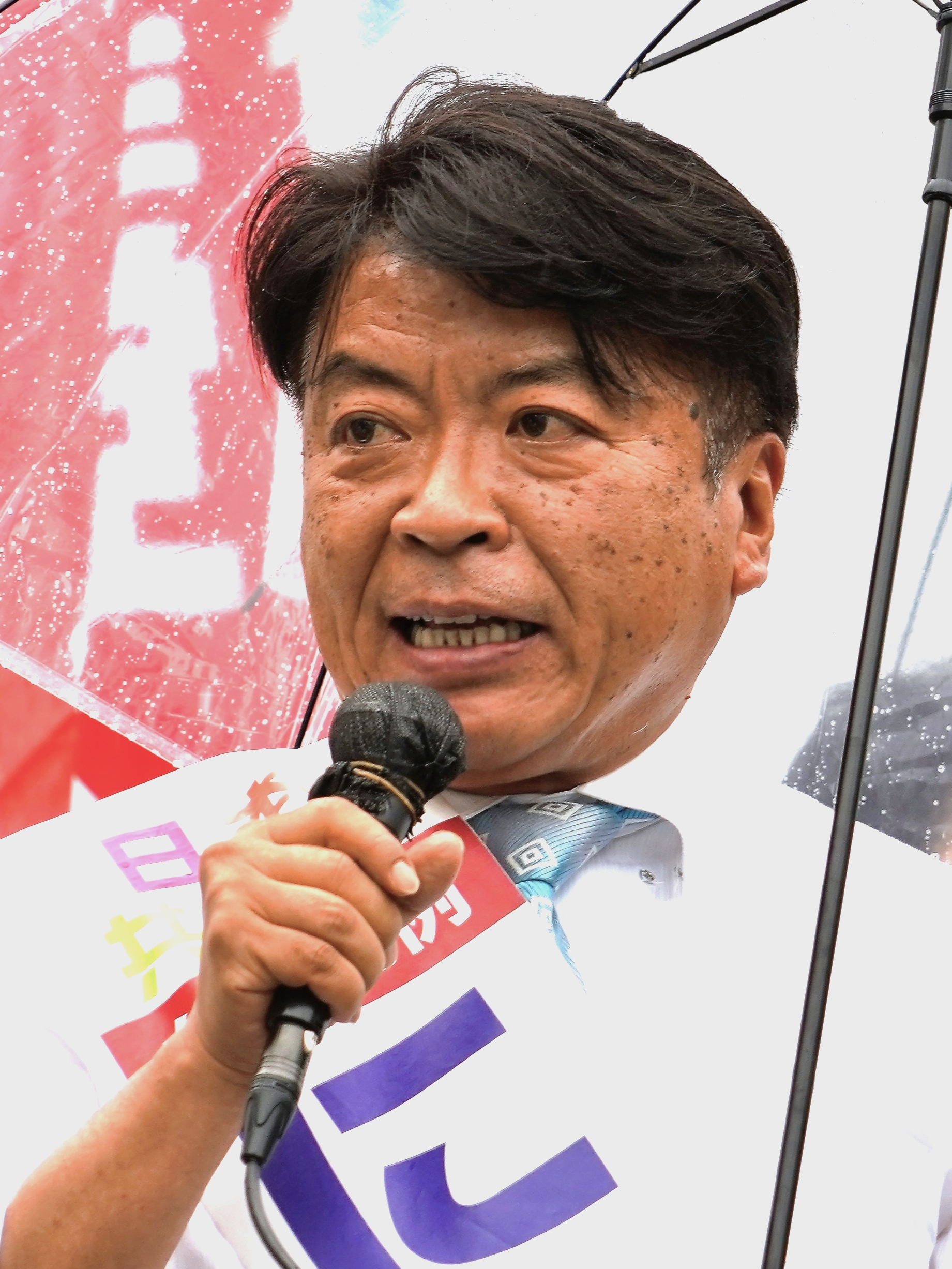
- Nihi in 2022

Member of the House of Councillors
- Incumbent
- Assumed office 26 July 2022
- Constituency: National PR
- In office 29 July 2013 – 28 July 2019
- Constituency: National PR
- In office 26 July 2004 – 25 July 2010
- Constituency: National PR

Personal details
- Born: 16 October 1963 (age 62) Tonata, Fukuoka, Japan
- Party: Communist
- Education: Kyoto University
- Website: 仁比そうへい ウェブサイト

Sohei Nihi (仁比 聡平, Nihi Sōhei; born October 16, 1963) is a Japanese politician of the Japan Communist Party, a member of the House of Councillors in the Diet (national legislature). A native of Kitakyushu, Fukuoka and graduate of Kyoto University, he was elected for the first time in 2004 after unsuccessful runs for the House of Representatives in 2000 and 2003 and for the House of Councillors in 2001.
