= Yataro Tsuda =

Japanese politician (1952–2026)

- 津田 弥太郎
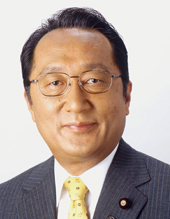
- Official portrait, 2011

Member of the House of Councillors
- In office 26 July 2004 – 25 July 2016
- Constituency: National PR

Personal details
- Born: May 5, 1952 Ōno, Gifu, Japan
- Died: April 6, 2026 (aged 73)
- Party: Democratic
- Other political affiliations: DP (2016)
- Education: Kanagawa University

Yataro Tsuda (津田 弥太郎, Tsuda Yatarō; May 5, 1952 – April 6, 2026) was a Japanese politician of the Democratic Party of Japan, who was a member of the House of Councillors in the Diet (national legislature). A native of Takayama, Gifu, he was elected for the first time in 2004. Tsuda died on April 6, 2026, at the age of 73.
