= Hiroyuki Tani =

Japanese politician

- 谷 博之
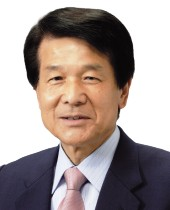
- Official portrait, 2012

Member of the House of Councillors
- In office 29 July 2001 – 28 July 2013
- Preceded by: Masayuki Kunii
- Succeeded by: Katsunori Takahashi
- Constituency: Tochigi at-large

Member of the Tochigi Prefectural Assembly
- In office 1987–2001
- Constituency: Utsunomiya City

Member of the Utsunomiya City Council
- In office 1979–1987

Personal details
- Born: 6 July 1943 (age 83) Tokushima City, Tokushima, Japan
- Party: Democratic (2001–2013)
- Other political affiliations: Socialist (1979–1996); Independent (1996–2001)
- Education: Utsunomiya University

Hiroyuki Tani (谷 博之, Tani Hiroyuki; born July 6, 1943) is a Japanese politician of the Democratic Party of Japan, a member of the House of Councillors in the Diet (national legislature). A native of Tokushima, Tokushima and graduate of Utsunomiya University, he had served in the city assembly of Utsunomiya, Tochigi for two terms since 1979 and then in the assembly of Tochigi Prefecture for four terms since 1987. He was elected to the House of Councillors for the first time in 2001.

House of Councillors
| Preceded by Junzō Iwasaki; Masayuki Kunii | Councillor for Tochigi; 2001–present Served alongside: Masayuki Kunii | Incumbent |
