= Toshiko Hayashi =

Japanese politician (1940–2022)

- 林 紀子

Member of the House of Councillors
- In office 26 July 1998 – 25 July 2004
- Constituency: National PR
- In office 23 July 1989 – 22 July 1995
- Constituency: National PR

Personal details
- Born: 27 February 1940 Gunma Prefecture, Japan
- Died: 25 January 2022 (aged 81) Hiroshima, Japan
- Party: Communist
- Education: Gunma University

Toshiko Hayashi (Japanese: 林 紀子, Hepburn: Hayashi Toshiko; 27 February 1940 - 25 January 2022) was a member of the Japanese Communist Party and former member of the House of Councillors. She was educated at Gunma University. In 1989, she was elected to the House of Councillors, and she took office in 1990.

Hayashi died on 25 January 2022 from amyotrophic lateral sclerosis.
