= Michiko Ueno =

Japanese politician

Ueno Michiko
- 上野 通子
- Official portrait, 2021

Member of the House of Councillors
- Incumbent
- Assumed office 26 July 2010
- Preceded by: Tetsuro Yano
- Constituency: Tochigi at-large

Member of the Tochigi Prefectural Assembly
- In office April 2003 – 10 July 2010
- Constituency: Utsunomiya City

Personal details
- Born: 21 April 1958 (age 68) Utsunomiya, Tochigi, Japan
- Party: Liberal Democratic
- Other political affiliations: Nippon Kaigi
- Education: Kyoritsu Women's University
- Website: ueno-michiko.jp

Michiko Ueno (上野 通子, Ueno Michiko; born 21 April 1958) is a Japanese politician. She is a member of the House of Councillors, the upper house of the National Diet of Japan. She was first elected to the House of Councillors in 2010 and was re-elected in 2016. Prior to that, she was a member of the Tochigi Prefectural Assembly from 2003 to 2010. She belongs to the Liberal Democratic Party. Ueno is affiliated to the revisionist lobby Nippon Kaigi.
