= Yasuo Yamashita =

Japanese politician

- 山下 八洲夫
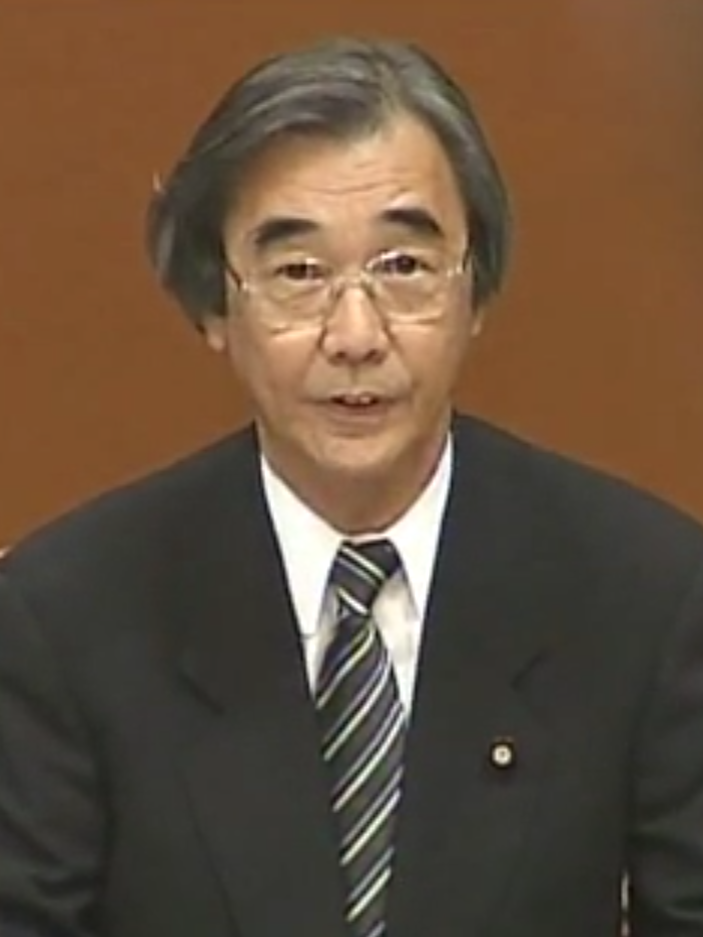
- Yamashita in 2008

Member of the House of Councillors
- In office 26 July 1998 – 25 July 2010
- Preceded by: Seat established
- Succeeded by: Yoshiharu Komiyama
- Constituency: Gifu at-large

Member of the House of Representatives
- In office 18 December 1983 – 27 September 1996
- Preceded by: Kanejirō Tate
- Succeeded by: Constituency abolished
- Constituency: Gifu 2nd

Personal details
- Born: 3 August 1942 (age 84) Hubei Province, China
- Party: Independent (1996–1997; 2022–present)
- Other political affiliations: JSP (1966–1996); SDP (1996); DP 1996 (1997–1998); DPJ (1998–2016); DP 2016 (2016–2018); CDP (2018–2022)
- Education: Chuo University

Yasuo Yamashita (山下 八洲夫, Yamashita Yasuo; born August 3, 1942) is a Japanese politician of the Democratic Party of Japan, formerly a member of the House of Councillors in the Diet (national legislature). A native of Hubei, China and dropout of Chuo University, he was elected to the House of Councillors for the first time in 1998 after serving in the assembly of the House of Representatives for four terms since 1983.
