= Tokio Kano =

Japanese politician (1935–2017)

- 加納 時男
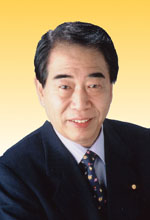

Member of the House of Councillors
- In office 26 July 1998 – 25 July 2010
- Constituency: National PR

Personal details
- Born: 5 January 1935 Chūō, Tokyo, Japan
- Died: 17 January 2017 (aged 82)
- Party: Liberal Democratic
- Education: University of Tokyo; Keio University

Tokio Kano (加納 時男, Kanō Tokio; January 5, 1935 – January 17, 2017) was a member of the House of Councillors, the upper house of the Japanese parliament. He was also a member of the Japanese parliament and a member of the Liberal Democratic Party. A native of Tokyo and graduate of the University of Tokyo and Keio University, he was elected to the House of Councillors for the first time in 1998.

He died on January 17, 2017, at the age of 82.
