= Eisuke Hinode =

Japanese politician

- 日出 英輔
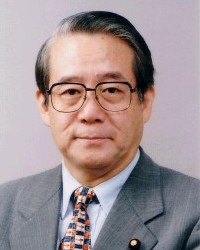

Member of the House of Councillors
- In office 26 July 1998 – 25 July 2004
- Constituency: National PR

Personal details
- Born: 19 July 1941 Kesennuma, Miyagi, Japan
- Died: 15 January 2012 (aged 70)
- Party: Liberal Democratic
- Education: Tohoku University

Eisuke Hinode (日出 英輔, Hinode Eisuke; July 19, 1941 – January 15, 2012) was a Japanese politician of the Liberal Democratic Party, a member of the House of Councillors in the Diet (national legislature) and the Parliamentary Secretary for Foreign Affairs. A native of Kesennuma City, Miyagi Prefecture, he graduated from Tohoku University in 1964. He was elected to the House of Councillors for the first time in 1998.
