= Yoshimitsu Takashima =

Japanese politician (born 1941)

- 高嶋 良充
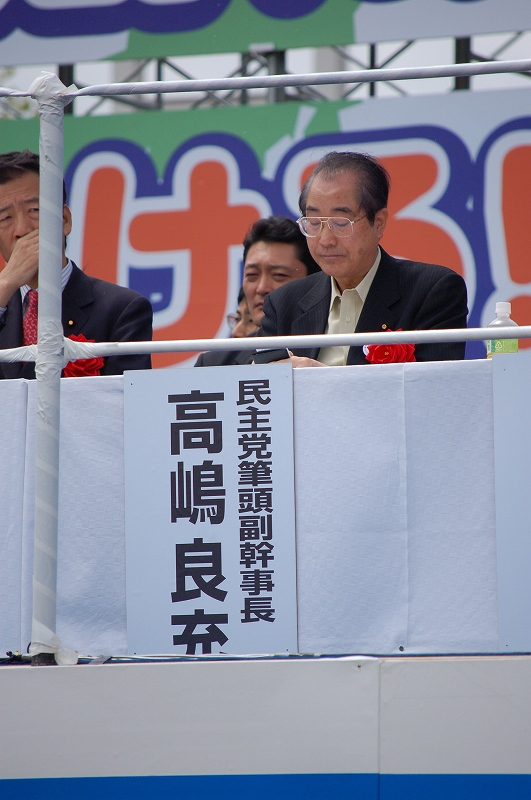
- Takashima in 2010

Member of the House of Councillors
- In office 26 July 1998 – 25 July 2010
- Constituency: National PR

Personal details
- Born: 10 March 1941 (age 85) Osaka Prefecture, Japan
- Party: DPP (since 2018)
- Other political affiliations: DPJ (1998–2016); DP (2016–2018)
- Education: Jyoto Technology High School

Yoshimitsu Takashima (高嶋 良充, Takashima Yoshimitsu; born March 10, 1941) is a Japanese politician of the Democratic Party of Japan, a member of the House of Councillors in the Diet (national legislature).

== Early life and career ==
A native of Hirakata, Osaka and high school graduate, he was elected to the House of Councillors for the first time in 1998.
