= Iwao Matsuda =

Japanese politician (1937–2022)

- 松田 岩夫
- Official portrait, 2001

Member of the House of Councillors
- In office 26 July 1998 – 25 July 2010
- Preceded by: Jun'ichi Kasahara
- Succeeded by: Takeyuki Watanabe
- Constituency: Gifu at-large

Member of the House of Representatives
- In office 7 July 1986 – 27 September 1996
- Preceded by: Sachiyo Minowa
- Succeeded by: Constituency abolished
- Constituency: Gifu 1st

Personal details
- Born: 19 May 1937 Gifu City, Gifu, Japan
- Died: 3 February 2022 (aged 84) Sagamihara, Kanagawa, Japan
- Party: Liberal Democratic (1986–1993; 1999–2010)
- Other political affiliations: Renewal (1993–1994); New Frontier (1994–1998); Independent (1998–1999)
- Education: University of Tokyo; University of London

Iwao Matsuda (松田 岩夫, Matsuda Iwao; 19 May 1937 – 3 February 2022) was a Japanese politician of the Liberal Democratic Party who was a member of the House of Councillors in the Diet (national legislature). A native of Gifu, Gifu, Japan, and graduate of the University of Tokyo, he joined the Ministry of International Trade and Industry in 1960, attending the University of London while in the ministry. Leaving the ministry in 1981, he was elected to the House of Representatives for the first time in 1986. After losing his seat in 1996, he was elected to the House of Councillors for the first time in 1998. Matsuda died from hypoglycemia on 3 February 2022, at the age of 84.
