= Masashi Waki =

Japanese politician

- 脇 雅史

Member of the House of Councillors
- In office 26 July 1998 – 25 July 2016
- Constituency: National PR

Personal details
- Born: 2 February 1945 (age 81) Suginami, Tokyo, Japan
- Party: Liberal Democratic
- Education: University of Tokyo

Masashi Waki (脇 雅史, Waki Masashi; born February 2, 1945) is a Japanese politician of the Liberal Democratic Party, a member of the House of Councillors in the Diet (national legislature). A native of Suginami, Tokyo and graduate of the University of Tokyo, he worked the Ministry of Construction from 1967 until 1997. In 1998, he was elected to the House of Councillors for the first time.
