= Akio Sato (politician, born 1943) =

Japanese politician

- 佐藤 昭郎
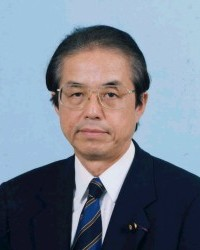

Member of the House of Councillors
- In office 26 July 1998 – 25 July 2010
- Constituency: National PR

Personal details
- Born: 10 February 1943 (age 83) Hiroshima Prefecture, Japan
- Party: Liberal Democratic
- Education: University of Tokyo

Akio Sato (佐藤 昭郎, Satō Akio; born February 10, 1943) is a Japanese politician. He served two terms in the House of Councillors in the Diet (national legislature) from 1998 until 2010 as a member of the Liberal Democratic Party. A native of Hiroshima Prefecture and graduate of the University of Tokyo, he worked at the Ministry of Agriculture, Forestry and Fisheries from 1966 to 1996.

Sato was born in Hiroshima Prefecture and graduated from Aomori Prefectural Hirosaki High School and the University of Tokyo, Faculty of Agriculture, Department of Agricultural Engineering. He joined the Ministry of Agriculture, Forestry and Fisheries in 1966, where he served as Director and Deputy Director of the Rural Development Bureau.

In the 18th House of Councillors regular election in 1998, he ran from a proportional representation district with the National Land Development Corporation as his support group and was elected. He served as Parliamentary Vice-Minister for the Director-General of the Defense Agency in the first Koizumi Cabinet and the first reshuffled Cabinet. Regarding the unpaid pension issue of politicians, he was unpaid for 1 year and 7 months.

Sato did not run in the 22nd House of Councillors regular election in 2010 and retired.
