= Toshio Fujii =

Japanese politician (1942–2026)

- 藤井俊男

Member of the House of Councillors
- In office 12 July 1998 – 11 July 2004

Personal details
- Born: 28 September 1942 Minami-Saitama District, Japan
- Died: 2 January 2026 (aged 83) Kawaguchi, Japan
- Party: DPJ
- Occupation: Engineer

Toshio Fujii (Japanese: 藤井俊男 Fujii Toshio; 28 September 1942 – 2 January 2026) was a Japanese politician. A member of the Democratic Party, he served in the House of Councillors from 1998 to 2004.

Fujii died of heart failure in Kawaguchi, on 2 January 2026, at the age of 83.
