= Tetsuro Yano =

Japanese politician

- 矢野 哲朗
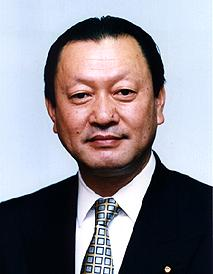

Member of the House of Councillors
- In office 26 July 1992 – 25 July 2010
- Preceded by: Tomoji Ōshima
- Succeeded by: Michiko Ueno
- Constituency: Tochigi at-large

Member of the Tochigi Prefectural Assembly
- In office 1983–1992

Personal details
- Born: 6 November 1946 (age 79) Utsunomiya, Tochigi, Japan
- Party: LDP (1983–2010)
- Other political affiliations: NRP (2010–2017)
- Parent: Noboru Yano (father)
- Education: Keio University

Tetsuro Yano (矢野 哲朗, Yano Tetsurō; born November 6, 1946) is a Japanese politician of the Liberal Democratic Party, a member of the House of Councillors in the Diet (national legislature). A native of Utsunomiya, Tochigi and graduate of Keio University, he was elected to the House of Councillors for the first time in 1992 after serving in the assembly of Tochigi Prefecture for three terms from 1983.
