= Kumamoto at-large district =

Japan House of Councillors constituency

- 鹿児島県選挙区
- Parliamentary constituency for the House of Councillors
- Prefecture: Kumamoto
- Electorate: 1,440,373 (as of September 2022)

Current constituency
- Created: 1947
- Seats: 2
- Councillors: Class of 2019: Seishi Baba (LDP); Class of 2022: Yoshifumi Matsumura (LDP)

Kumamoto at-large district is a constituency in the House of Councillors of Japan, the upper house of the Diet of Japan (national legislature). It elects two members to the House of Councillors, one per election. The district, like many other two-seat, rural prefectures, is an LDP stronghold, having not elected an opposition member since 1998. The representatives are:

- Seishi Baba, first elected in 2013. Term ends in 2025. Member of the Liberal Democratic Party.
- Yoshifumi Matsumura, first elected in 2004. Term ends in 2022. Member of the Liberal Democratic Party.

The district has an electorate of 1,465,399 as of May 2021.
