= 2018 Liberal Democratic Party presidential election =

Political party election in Japan

- 20 September 2018
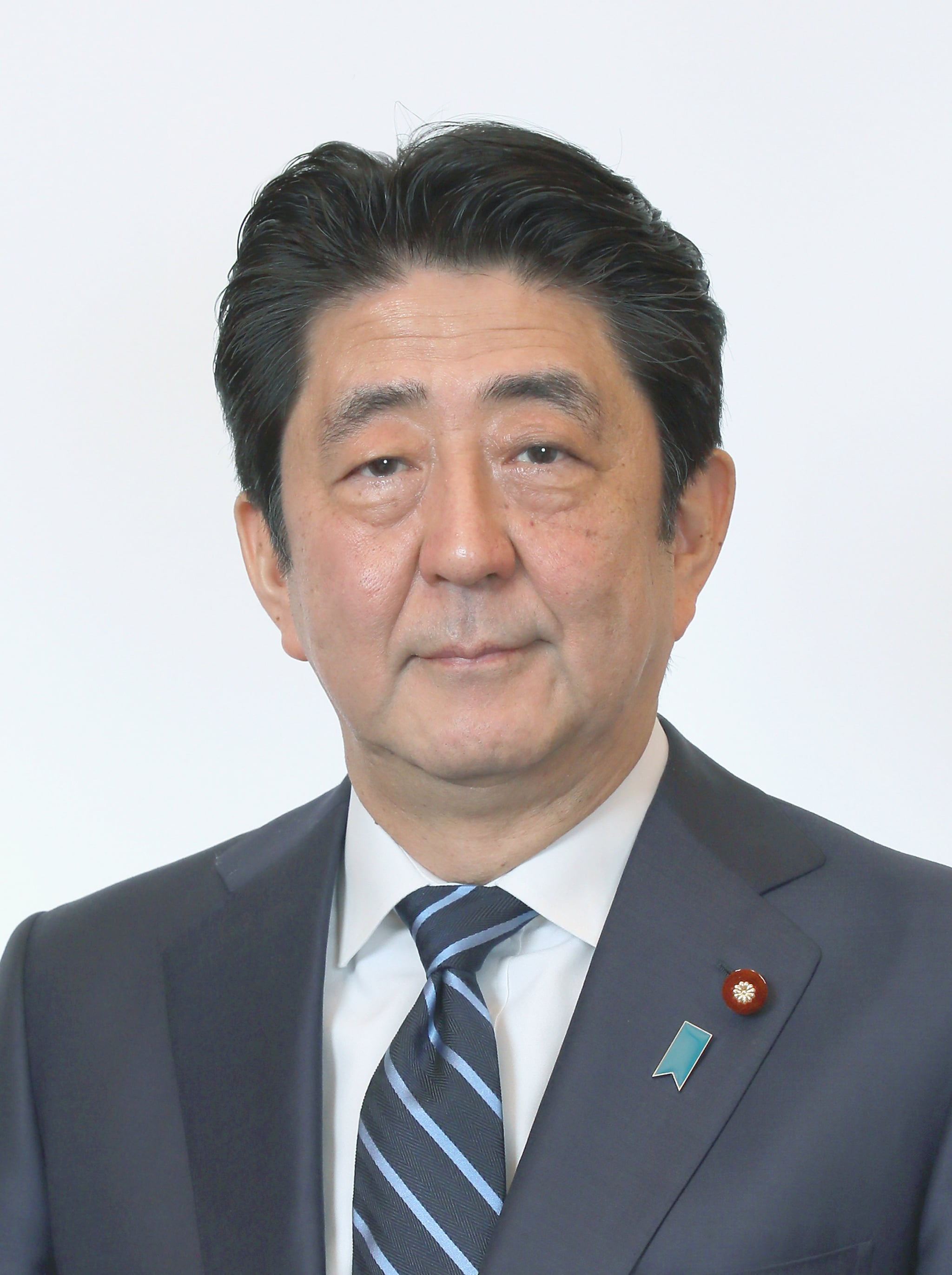

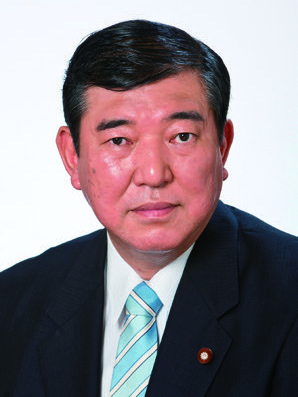
Candidate	Shinzo Abe	Shigeru Ishiba
Leader's seat	Yamaguchi 4th	Tottori 1st
LDP MPs	329 (81.84%)	73 (18.16%)
Party members	224 (55.31%)	181 (44.69%)
Total	553 (68.53%)	254 (31.47%)
- Election results
President before election
Shinzo Abe
Elected President
Shinzo Abe

A presidential election was held on 20 September 2018 to elect the next president of the Liberal Democratic Party of Japan for a new 3-year term. Incumbent president Shinzo Abe was running for his re-election after a rule change in 2017 that allowed him to run for a third term.

Abe's subsequent victory led to him staying as prime minister for just under two years. In this time, on 22 November 2019, he broke the record for the nation's longest-serving prime ministership previously held by Taro Katsura, who had served three times between 1901 and 1913. He also served the longest uninterrupted term by 24 August 2020, ahead of Eisaku Satō's 2,797 days, before resigning four days later.

== Background ==
=== Scandals ===
In March 2018, it was revealed that the Finance Ministry (with finance minister Tarō Asō at its head) had falsified documents presented to the parliament in relation to the Moritomo Gakuen scandal, to remove 14 passages implicating Abe. It has been suggested that the scandal could cost Abe his seat as the Liberal Democratic Party's leader. A Kyodo poll showed the Japanese government popularity's has fallen as low as 30% from 44% in February.

== Candidates ==
=== Nominated ===
Candidate(s)	Date of birth	Notable positions	Party faction(s)	District(s)	Announced	Reference(s)
Shinzo Abe	21 September 1954 (age 63)	President of the LDP (2006-2007, since 2012); Prime Minister (2006–2007, since 2012); Member of the House of Representatives (since 1993); Chief Cabinet Secretary (2005–2006)	Seiwa Seisaku Kenkyūkai (Hosoda)	Yamaguchi 4th	26 August	
Shigeru Ishiba	4 February 1957 (age 61)	Member of the House of Representatives (since 1986); Defense Minister (2007–2008); 2008, 2012 LDP leadership candidate	Suigetsukai (Ishiba)	Tottori 1st	1 September	

=== Expressed intention but did not have enough supporters for nomination ===
- Seiko Noda, then-Interior Minister.
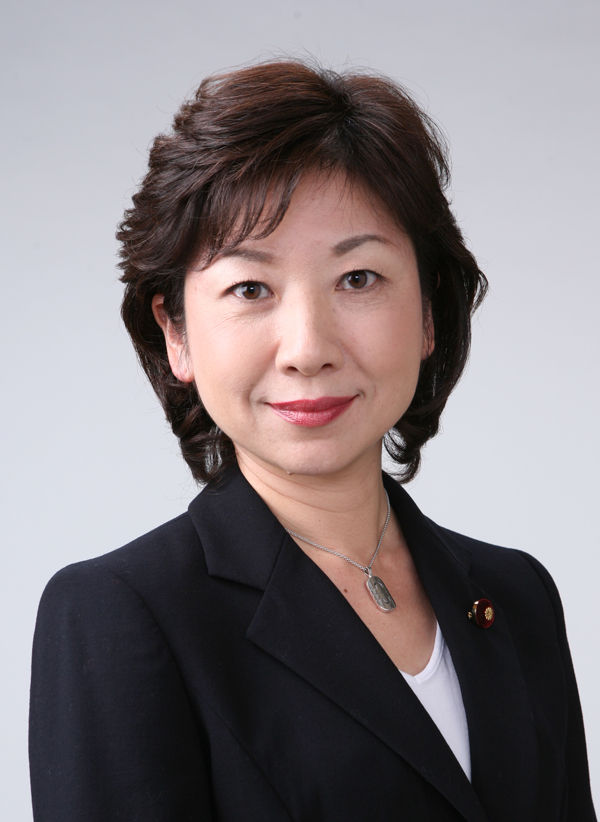
Interior Minister
Seiko Noda
(2017–2018)

=== Speculative ===
- Tarō Kōno, current Foreign Minister. Son of Yōhei Kōno, a former Speaker of the House of Representatives.
- Tarō Asō, current Finance Minister and former Prime Minister of Japan. Grandson of former Prime Minister Shigeru Yoshida.
- Shinjiro Koizumi, First Vice Secretary-General of the LDP and son of former Prime Minister Junichiro Koizumi.
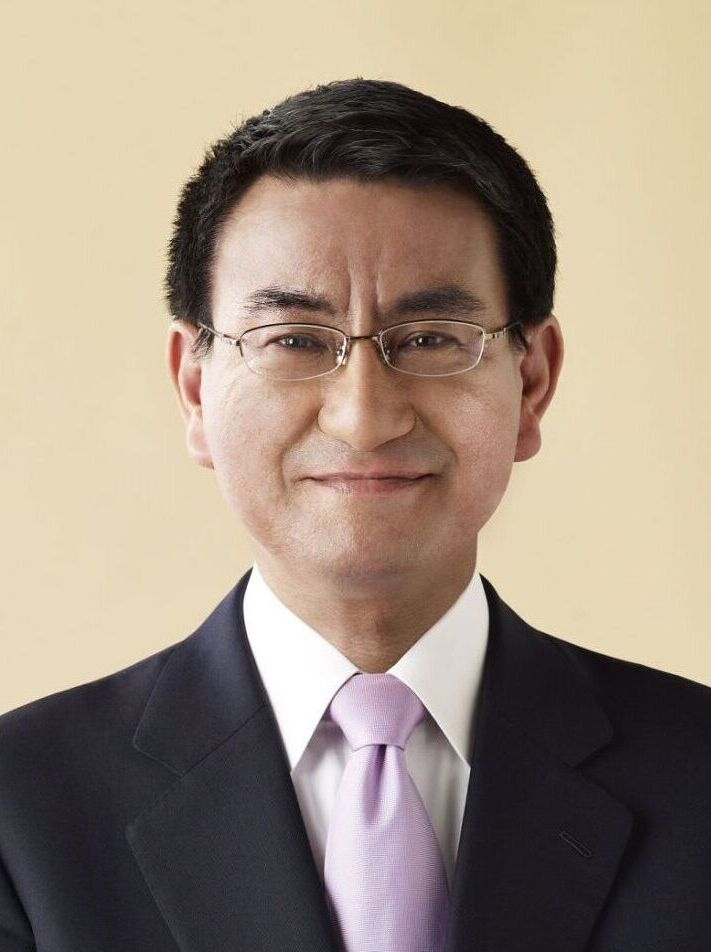
Foreign Minister
Tarō Kōno
(2017–2019)

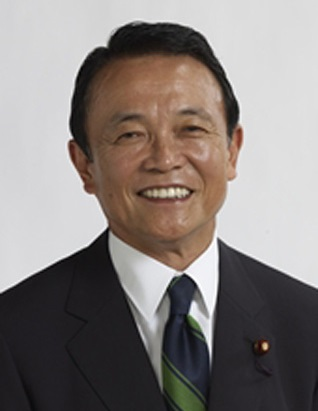
Finance Minister
Tarō Asō
(2012–2021)

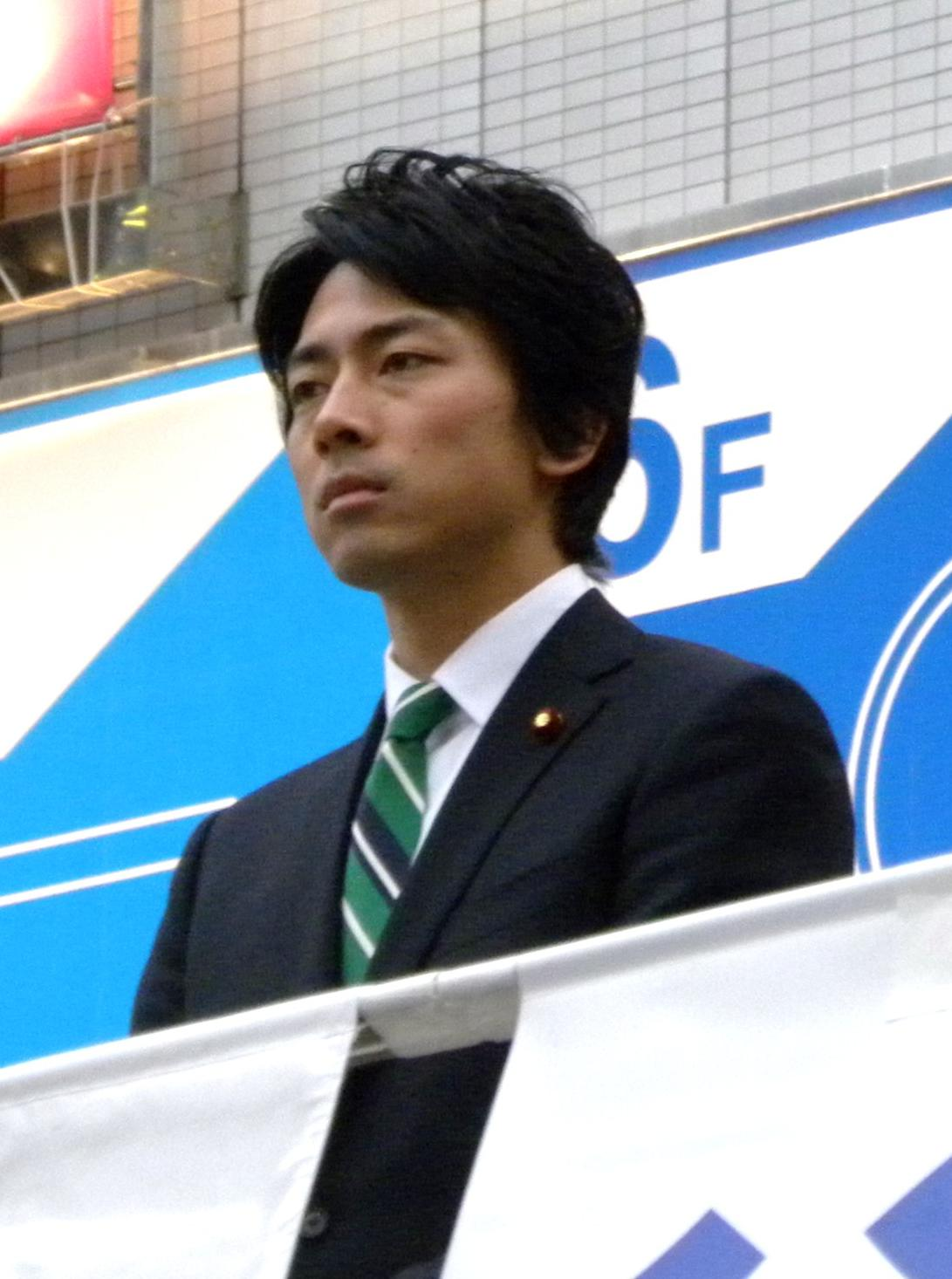
First Vice Secretary-General of the LDP
Shinjirō Koizumi
(2017–present)

=== Declined ===
- Fumio Kishida, current chair of the LDP Policy Research Council and former Foreign Minister in the Second and Third Abe Cabinet.
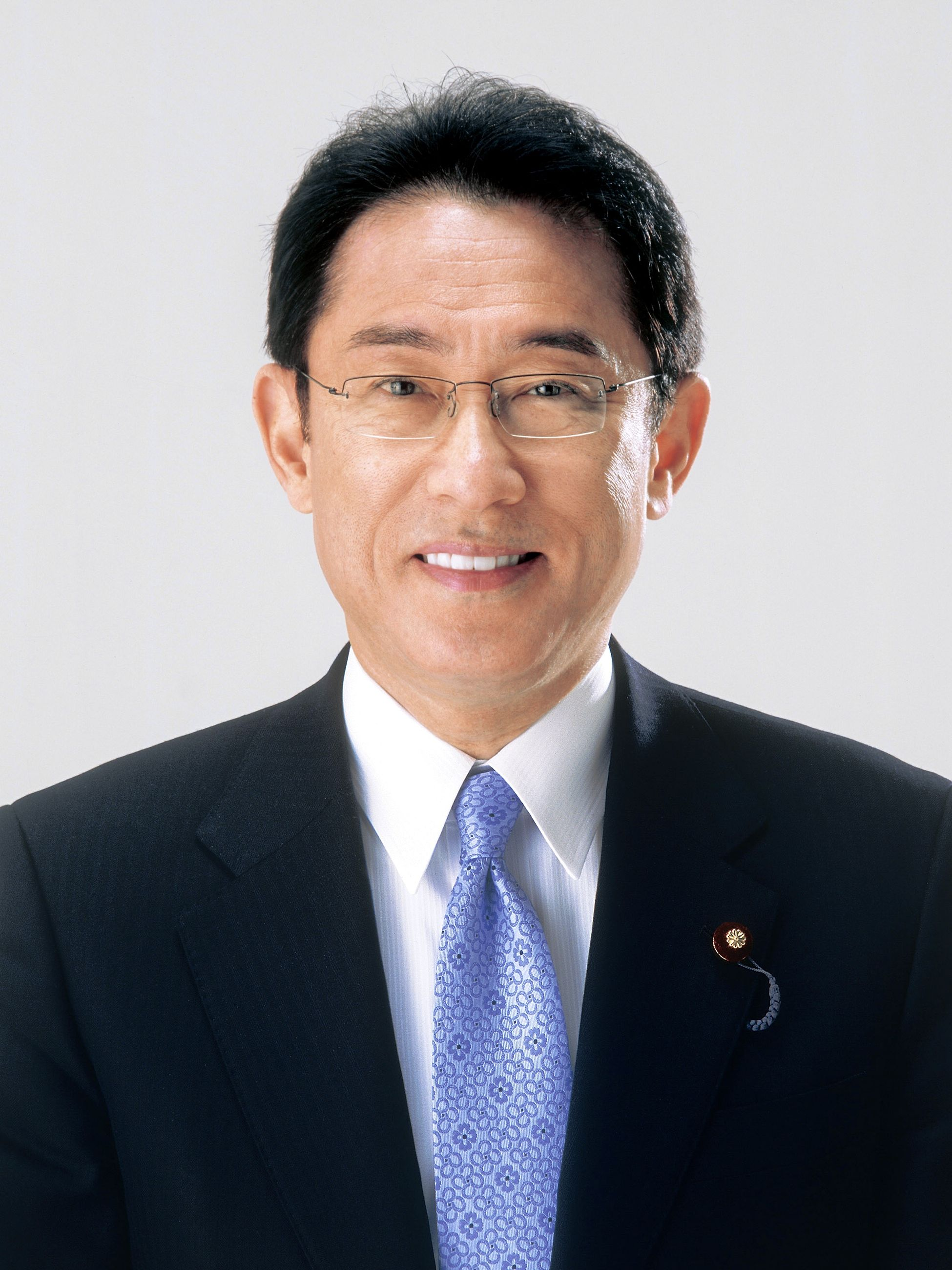
Foreign Minister
Fumio Kishida
(2012–2017)

== Supporters ==
=== Recommenders ===
Party regulations require candidates to have the written support at least 20 Diet members, known as recommenders, to run.

Shinzo Abe

Leader of recommenders

- Seiko Hashimoto (Member of the House of Councillors from National PR block) (Seiwakai)

Campaign Manager

- Akira Amari (Member of the House of Representatives for Kanagawa 13th district) (Shikōkai)

Recommenders

- Hirotaka Ishihara (Member of the House of Representatives for Tokyo 3rd district) (Kinmirai Seiji Kenkyūkai)
- Seishiro Eto (Member of the House of Representatives for Ōita 2nd district) (Seiwakai)
- Toshiaki Endo (Member of the House of Representatives for Yamagata 1st district) (Yūrinkai)
- Toshitaka Ōoka (Member of the House of Representatives for Shiga 1st district) (Shisuikai)
- Tetsushi Sakamoto (Member of the House of Representatives for Kumamoto 3rd district) (Kinmirai Seiji Kenkyūkai)
- Katsuei Hirasawa (Member of the House of Representatives for Tokyo 17th district) (Shisuikai)
- Noriko Horiuchi (Member of the House of Representatives for Yamanashi 2nd district) (Kōchikai)
- Mitsuhiro Miyakoshi (Member of the House of Representatives for Toyama 2nd district) (Kōchikai)
- Hiromichi Watanabe (Member of the House of Representatives for Chiba 6th district) (Heiseiken)
- Shigeharu Aoyama (Member of the House of Councillors from National PR block) (no faction)
- Haruko Arimura (Member of the House of Councillors from National PR block) (Shikōkai)
- Masahisa Sato (Member of the House of Councillors from National PR block) (Heiseiken)
- Emiko Takagai (Member of the House of Councillors from National PR block) (Seiwakai)
- Yoshifumi Tsuge (Member of the House of Councillors from National PR block) (no faction)
- Ichiro Tsukada (Member of the House of Councillors from Niigata) (Shikōkai)
- Takashi Hanyuda (Member of the House of Councillors from National PR block) (Seiwakai)
- Toru Miki (Member of the House of Councillors from National PR block) (Shisuikai)
- Toshiei Mizuochi (Member of the House of Councillors from National PR block) (Kōchikai)
Shigeru Ishiba

Leader of recommenders

- Hidehisa Otsuji (Member of the House of Councillors from Kagoshima) (Heiseiken)

Campaign Manager

- Yoshihisa Furukawa (Member of the House of Representatives for Miyazaki 3rd district) (Suigetsukai)

Recommenders

- Junichi Ishii (Member of the House of Councillors from Chiba) (Heiseiken)
- Yoshifumi Matsumura (Member of the House of Councillors from Kumamoto) (Heiseiken)
- Kazuhiko Aoki (Member of the House of Councillors from Tottori-Shimane) (Heiseiken)
- Saburo Shimada (Member of the House of Councillors from Shimane) (Heiseiken)
- Shōji Maitachi (Member of the House of Councillors from Tottori) (Suigetsukai)
- Satoshi Nakanishi (Member of the House of Councillors from National PR block) (Suigetsukai)
- Seiichiro Murakami (Member of the House of Representatives for Ehime 2nd district) (no faction)
- Gen Nakatani (Member of the House of Representatives for Kōchi 1st district) (Yūrinkai)
- Kisaburo Tokai (Member of the House of Representatives for Hyōgo 10th district) (no faction)
- Keiichiro Tachibana (Member of the House of Representatives for Toyama 3rd district) (no faction)
- Tatsuya Ito (Member of the House of Representatives for Tokyo 22nd district) (Suigetsukai)
- Norihisa Tamura (Member of the House of Representatives for Mie 1st district) (Suigetsukai)
- Ryosei Akazawa (Member of the House of Representatives for Tottori 2nd district) (Suigetsukai)
- Masaaki Taira (Member of the House of Representatives for Tokyo 4th district) (Suigetsukai)
- Mamoru Fukuyama (Member of the House of Representatives for Shikoku PR block) (Suigetsukai)
- Yoshinori Tadokoro (Member of the House of Representatives for Ibaraki 1st district) (Suigetsukai)
- Saichi Kamiyama (Member of the House of Representatives for Saitama 7th district) (Suigetsukai)
- Hiroyuki Togashi (Member of the House of Representatives for Akita 1st district) (Suigetsukai)

Number of recommenders by factions

Candidates	Shinzo Abe	Shigeru Ishiba
Heisei Kenkyūkai	2	5
Kinmirai Seiji Kenkyūkai	2	0
Kōchikai	3	0
Seiwa Seisaku Kenkyūkai	4	0
Shikōkai	3	0
Shisuikai	3	0
Suigetsukai	0	11
Yūrinkai	1	1
No faction	2	3

== Results ==
Full result
Candidate	Diet members		Party members				Total points	
Candidate	Votes	%	Popular votes	%	Allocated votes	%	Votes	%
Shinzo Abe 当	329	81.84%	355,487	55.42%	224	55.31%	553	68.53%
Shigeru Ishiba	73	18.16%	286,003	44.58%	181	44.69%	254	31.47%
Total	402	100.00%	641,490	100.00%	405	100.00%	807	100.00%
Valid votes	402	99.26%	641,490	99.66%	405	100.00%	807	99.63%
Invalid and blank votes	3	0.74%	2,191	0.34%	0	0.00%	3	0.37%
Turnout	405	100.00%	643,681	61.74%	405	100.00%	810	100.00%
Registered voters	405	100.00%	1,042,647	100.00%	405	100.00%	810	100.00%

=== Results of Party Members' Votes by Prefectures ===
Results of Party Members' Votes by Prefectures
Prefectures	Shinzo Abe		Shigeru Ishiba	
Prefectures	Votes	%	Votes	%
Aichi	14,611	54.7%	12,122	45.3%
Akita	3,229	53.2%	2,843	46.8%
Aomori	3,480	58.0%	2,517	42.0%
Chiba	9,131	52.6%	8,238	47.4%
Ehime	6,945	55.4%	5,581	44.6%
Fukui	4,786	63.2%	2,791	36.8%
Fukuoka	10,442	64.0%	5,883	36.0%
Fukushima	5,209	54.4%	4,368	45.6%
Gifu	10,955	53.2%	9,630	46.8%
Gunma	6,802	46.4%	7,847	53.6%
Hiroshima	15,095	71.0%	6,171	29.0%
Hokkaido	11,711	54.4%	9,819	45.6%
Hyōgo	8,193	53.7%	7,063	46.3%
Ibaraki	9,927	41.6%	13,951	58.4%
Ishikawa	9,161	65.0%	4,936	35.0%
Iwate	2,568	54.2%	2,170	45.8%
Kagawa	6,752	58.5%	4,783	41.5%
Kagoshima	5,938	57.0%	4,478	43.0%
Kanagawa	20,901	61.0%	13,371	39.0%
Kōchi	1,499	28.4%	3,778	71.6%
Kumamoto	6,143	55.1%	5,011	44.9%
Kyoto	5,073	57.1%	3,807	42.9%
Mie	3,437	45.0%	4,194	55.0%
Miyagi	4,299	56.6%	3,301	43.4%
Miyazaki	3,112	41.5%	4,380	58.5%
Nagano	5,406	50.1%	5,391	49.9%
Nagasaki	7,167	60.4%	4,704	39.6%
Nara	3,332	66.6%	1,674	33.4%
Niigata	8,880	54.6%	7,384	45.4%
Ōita	5,768	62.0%	3,542	38.0%
Okayama	7,060	57.5%	5,218	42.5%
Okinawa	1,753	61.7%	1,086	38.3%
Osaka	11,813	60.8%	7,620	39.2%
Saga	3,343	51.5%	3,149	48.5%
Saitama	12,177	54.3%	10,257	45.7%
Shiga	4,056	57.6%	2,991	42.4%
Shimane	2,257	22.6%	7,748	77.4%
Shizuoka	9,410	57.6%	6,916	42.4%
Tochigi	6,257	55.0%	5,124	45.0%
Tokushima	2,925	42.5%	3,963	57.5%
Tokyo	33,351	58.0%	24,110	42.0%
Tottori	421	5.0%	7,933	95.0%
Toyama	9,452	46.9%	10,685	53.1%
Wakayama	8,698	81.3%	2,003	18.7%
Yamagata	3,172	41.9%	4,402	58.1%
Yamaguchi	12,488	87.6%	1,760	12.4%
Yamanashi	6,902	56.5%	5,310	43.5%
Total	355,487	55.4%	286,003	44.6%
