= List of districts of the Senate of Japan =

Map showing Japan's prefectures, which until 2015 coincided with the Senate districts. In 2015, Tottori (31 on map) and Shimane (32) districts were combined as Tottori-Shimane, and Tokushima (36) and Kochi (39) districts were combined as Tokushima-Kochi.

The Senate (formerly named the House of Councillors), the upper house of the Japanese National Diet, is made up of 248 members elected from 45 districts plus a national proportional representation list. Until 2015, there were 47 districts which coincided with the 47 prefectures of Japan.

In order to address the imbalance in voter representation between rural and urban voters, the Public Officers Election Law was amended in 2012 and again in 2015. The 2015 amendment merged the two smallest districts, the Tottori and Shimane districts, to create a combined Tottori-Shimane at-large district, and merged the third- and fourth-smallest districts, the Kochi and Tokushima districts, to create a combined Tokushima-Kōchi at-large district. Other changes to the number of senators have also been made to address the imbalance.

== List of districts ==
District	Registered voters	Magnitude			
District	Registered voters	Magnitude	Aichi	5,927,668	8
Akita	888,496	2			
Aomori	1,122,948	2			
Chiba	5,092,741	6			
Ehime	1,169,427	2			
Fukui	644,447	2			
Fukuoka	4,135,977	6			
Fukushima	1,607,908	2			
Gifu	1,666,610	2			
Gunma	1,616,400	2			
Hiroshima	2,313,131	4			
Hokkaido	4,537,448	6			
Hyogo	4,536,912	6			
Ibaraki	2,411,307	4			
Ishikawa	939,531	2			
Iwate	1,074,018	2			
Kagawa	818,470	2			
Kagoshima	1,371,073	2			
Kanagawa	7,421,431	8			
Kumamoto	1,473,659	2			
Kyoto	2,088,383	4			
Mie	1,489,396	2			
Miyagi	1,907,518	2			
Miyazaki	918,533	2			
Nagano	1,737,214	2			
Nagasaki	1,148,570	2			
Nara	1,140,129	2			
Niigata	1,925,565	2			
Ōita	972,380	2			
Okayama	1,566,428	2			
Okinawa	1,115,392	2			
Osaka	7,140,578	8			
Saga	679,289	2			
Saitama	5,933,788	8			
Shiga	1,121,066	2			
Shizuoka	3,052,579	4			
Tochigi	1,621,930	2			
Tokushima-Kochi	1,261,100	2			
Tokyo	10,947,527	12			
Tottori-Shimane	1,051,880	2			
Toyama	888,832	2			
Wakayama	825,373	2			
Yamagata	937,920	2			
Yamaguchi	1,173,848	2			
Yamanashi	692,001	2			
Total	104,106,821	148			

== National PR block ==
In addition to the smaller districts mentioned above, the Senate also has a single block for the entire nation. It elects 50 members per election (100 in total) based on the D'Hondt method.

== See also ==
- List of districts of the House of Representatives of Japan
