= Mikio Aoki =

Japanese politician (1934–2023)

- 青木 幹雄
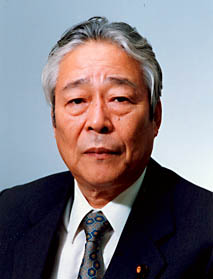
- Official portrait, 1999

Acting Prime Minister of Japan
- In office 3 April 2000 – 5 April 2000
- Monarch: Akihito
- Preceded by: Keizō Obuchi
- Succeeded by: Yoshirō Mori

Chief Cabinet Secretary; Director-General of the Okinawa Development Agency
- In office 5 October 1999 – 4 July 2000
- Prime Minister: Keizō Obuchi; Himself (acting); Yoshirō Mori
- Preceded by: Hiromu Nonaka
- Succeeded by: Hidenao Nakagawa

Member of the House of Councillors
- In office 8 July 1986 – 25 July 2010
- Preceded by: Hisaoki Kamei
- Succeeded by: Kazuhiko Aoki
- Constituency: Shimane at-large

Personal details
- Born: 8 June 1934 Taisha, Shimane, Japan
- Died: 11 June 2023 (aged 89) Kawasaki, Kanagawa, Japan
- Party: Liberal Democratic
- Children: Kazuhiko Aoki
- Education: Waseda University (incomplete)

Mikio Aoki (Japanese: 青木 幹雄, Hepburn: Aoki Mikio; 8 June 1934 – 11 June 2023) was a Japanese politician who served as the Chief Cabinet Secretary from 1999 to 2000, and was briefly acting prime minister following Keizō Obuchi's coma. A member of the Liberal Democratic Party (LDP), he also served as the Chairman of the LDP in the House of Councillors.

== Early life and career ==
Mikio Aoki was born on 8 June 1934, in Taisha in Shimane Prefecture, to a family of prosperous fishermen. After graduating from Shimane Prefectural Taisha High School, Aoki enrolled at Waseda University. He joined the Oratorical Society and became its secretary. He befriended Yoshirō Mori who was also in the Oratorical Society.

In the 1958 Japanese general election, Aoki volunteered for Noboru Takeshita, a Waseda alumni who was running to represent Shimane for the Liberal Democratic Party. When Takeshita was elected, Aoki dropped out of university to serve as his secretary.

Aoki was elected to the Shimane Prefectural Assembly in 1961. He was vice chairman from 1983 to 1984. Upon Takeshita's request, Aoki ran in the 1986 House of Councillors election and was elected.

== Diet member ==
Aoki joined the Keiseikai formed by Takeshita in 1987. Aoki was parliamentary secretary for the Ministry of Finance from 1991 to 1992 and chairman of the House of Councillors Committee on Agriculture, Forestry and Fisheries from 1994 to 1995.

Following the 1998 House of Councillors election, Obuchi, who was then head of the Keiseikai, became Prime Minister and Aoki became Secretary-General for the LDP in the House of Councillors. The reshuffle in December of the following year made Aoki Chief Cabinet Secretary and Director-General of the Okinawa Development Agency.

=== Acting prime minister ===
Obuchi suffered a stroke in April 2000 and fell into a coma. Aoki took over as acting prime minister. Once it became clear Obuchi would not recover, Aoki met with the principal officers of the LDP at the time: Yoshiro Mori, Hiromu Nonaka, Shizuka Kamei and Masakuni Murakami. The five men wanted to ensure a swift succession and agreed to designate Mori as the next LDP President. This decision was endorsed by the party convention and Mori became prime minister on 5 April 2000.

Mori initially retained the entire Obuchi cabinet, including Aoki, but after the reshuffle in December, he returned to his post as Secretary-General for the LDP in the House of Councillors. Takeshita died in June 2000.

=== Don of the House of Councillors ===
The old Keiseikai, which had been renamed the Heisei Kenkyukai, was then led by former Prime Minister Ryutaro Hashimoto. Aoki and Hiromu Nonaka were prominent leaders in the faction at this time. When Junichiro Koizumi succeeded Mori as Prime Minister, Nonaka took a confrontational stance while Aoki was cooperative. In the 2003 LDP leadership election, Hiromu Nonaka endorsed Takao Fujii while Aoki supported the re-election of Koizumi. The votes of the faction were split and Koizumi was reelected.

After the 2004 House of Councillors election, Aoki was promoted from Secretary-General to chairman for the LDP in the House of Councillors. It was said that Koizumi trusted him with all matters regarding the House of Councillors, including nominating cabinet ministers from the house. Aoki began to be called the "Don of the House of Councillors." Aoki resigned as chairman to take responsibility for the unsuccessful 2007 House of Councillors election.

Aoki intended to run for another term in the 2010 House of Councillors election. However, he suffered a mild stroke and was swiftly replaced as a candidate by his son Kazuhiko.

== Retirement ==
Even in retirement, he remained influential, especially over the House and Councillors and the Heisei Kenkyukai. In the 2018 LDP leadership election he endorsed Shigeru Ishiba against the incumbent Shinzo Abe, and requested his old faction to do the same. However, Toshimitsu Motegi and Katsunobu Kato rallied faction members in support of Abe, who was successful.

After Fumio Kishida became Prime Minister, Aoki dined with him several times along with former Prime Minister Yoshiro Mori. They were reportedly consulted on personnel matters.

Aoki died on 11 June 2023, just three days after his 89th birthday.

House of Councillors
| Preceded by Masaru Urata | Chairman, House of Councillors Committee on Agriculture, Forestry and Fisheries; 1994–1995 | Succeeded by Seijiro Ohtsuka |
Political offices
| Preceded by Hiromu Nonaka | Chief Cabinet Secretary; 1999–2000 | Succeeded by Hidenao Nakagawa |
| Preceded by Hiromu Nonaka | Director-General of the Okinawa Development Agency; 1999–2000 | Succeeded by Hidenao Nakagawa |
| Preceded by Keizō Obuchi | Prime Minister of Japan; Acting; 2000 | Succeeded by Yoshirō Mori |
Party political offices
| Preceded by Masakuni Murakami | Secretary-General for the LDP in the House of Councillors; 1998–2004 | Succeeded by Toranosuke Katayama |
| Preceded by Yutaka Takeyama | Chairman, General Assembly of Party Members of the House of Councillors; 2004–2007 | Succeeded by Hidehisa Otsuji |
