= Kazuyuki Hamada =

Japanese politician

- 浜田 和幸
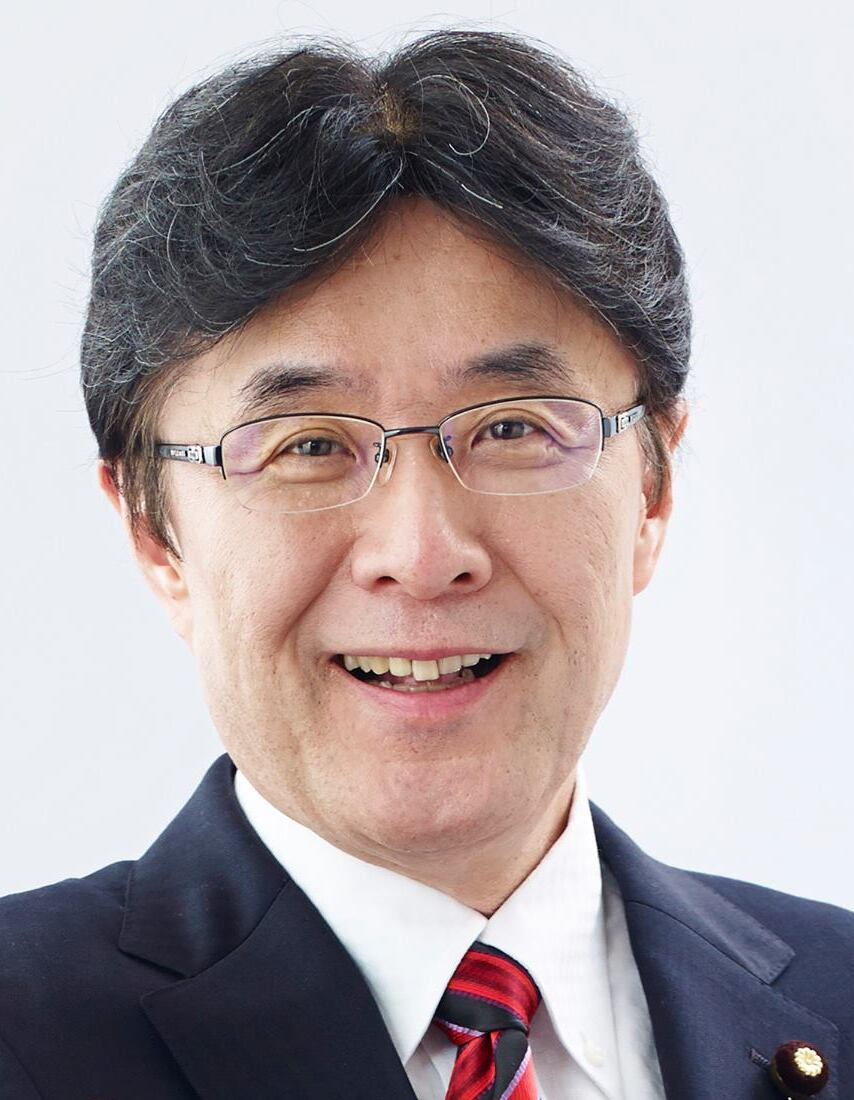
- Official portrait, 2015

Vice Minister of Foreign Affairs
- In office 5 September 2011 – 26 December 2012
- Prime Minister: Yoshihiko Noda
- Preceded by: Makiko Kikuta, Ikuo Yamahana, Hisashi Tokunaga
- Succeeded by: Toshiko Abe, Minoru Kiuchi, Kenta Wakabayashi

Vice Minister for Internal Affairs and Communications
- In office 27 June 2011 – 2 September 2011
- Prime Minister: Naoto Kan
- Preceded by: Akira Uchiyama
- Succeeded by: Akio Fukuda

Member of the House of Councillors
- In office 26 July 2010 – 25 July 2016
- Preceded by: Kotaro Tamura
- Succeeded by: Constituency abolished
- Constituency: Tottori at-large

Personal details
- Born: 17 March 1953 (age 73) Yonago, Tottori, Japan
- Party: Independent (2013–2014; 2016–present)
- Other political affiliations: LDP (2010–2011); PNP (2011–2013); PJK (2014–2016); JIP (2016)
- Education: Tokyo University of Foreign Studies; George Washington University
- Website: www.hamadakazuyuki.com

Kazuyuki Hamada (浜田 和幸, Hamada Kazuyuki; born 17 March 1953) is a Japanese politician. He has served one term in the House of Councillors for the Tottori At-large district. After being elected in 2010 as a candidate for the Liberal Democratic Party, he changed parties three times before unsuccessfully seeking re-election as an independent candidate in 2016.

== Early life and education ==
Hamada was born in Yonago, Tottori on 17 March 1953. His father was employed at Japanese National Railways and his mother was from a farming family. He graduated from the Tokyo University of Foreign Studies with a degree in Chinese language in 1975 and joined Nippon Steel the same year. After leaving Nippon Steel Hamada joined the Center for Strategic and International Studies in Washington, D.C., becoming a Fellow and associate director in 1987. He obtained a Ph.D. in political science from George Washington University in 1992. In 1995 he became a consultant at the United States' Congressional Research Service.

== Political career ==
Hamada contested the Tottori at-large district of the national House of Councillors at the July 2010 election as a candidate for the Liberal Democratic Party. He won the seat with 50.2% percent of the vote and defeated the Democratic Party of Japan candidate Mari Sakano, the granddaughter of Shigenobu Sakano, a former LDP member who had held the seat from 1986 until his death in April 2002.

On 27 June 2011, whilst still a member of the opposition LDP, Hamada was offered a position in the government of Naoto Kan as Vice-Minister for Internal Affairs and Communications. The position would see Hamada be responsible for recovery efforts arising from the March 2011 Tōhoku earthquake and tsunami. He resigned from the LDP and joined the ministry the following day. The LDP responded to the move a week later by rejecting his resignation and instead expelling him from the party. He sat as an independent for several months before joining the People's New Party on 29 December 2011.

In September 2011 Kan was replaced as prime minister by Yoshihiko Noda. Hamada became a Vice-Minister for Foreign Affairs in Noda's cabinet and remained in the position until the DPJ were defeated by the LDP in the December 2012 general election. The People's New Party also performed poorly in the election, and in the aftermath Hamada became Secretary-General of the party. By March 2013 he and party leader Shozaburo Jimi were the only party members remaining in the Diet and they decided to disband the party. Whilst again sitting as an independent, he caused some controversy in April 2014 during United States President Barack Obama's state visit to Japan by claiming that Michelle Obama's absence from the visit was evidence that the couple were "negotiating a divorce". Hamada joined the Party for Future Generations in November 2014, which changed its name to the Party for Japanese Kokoro in December 2015. From the same time Hamada served as the party's Diet leader.

=== 2016 re-election campaign ===
In April 2016 Hamada resigned from the Party for Japanese Kokoro and joined Initiatives from Osaka. Hamada's Tottori constituency was to be merged with the Shimane at-large district to create the Tottori-Shimane at-large district and contesting the new seat as a minor party candidate against Kazuhiko Aoki, the LDP's incumbent member for Shimane, would prove too difficult. Instead Hamada received a nomination to contest the summer 2016 election from the national proportional representation block as an Initiatives from Osaka candidate. However, on Friday 27 May 2016 Hamada caused controversy when he was absent from the House of Councillors, which was debating bills related to relief following the 2016 Kumamoto earthquakes, in order to attend a party meeting in Osaka for Osaka prefectural representatives. He greeted the meeting by saying "I have come today to say a greeting to the all-star cast in attendance". His attendance was intended to gain support within the party for his national block campaign, and Hamada later explained that he had the party's permission to be absent from the House debate. However, the party's leader in the Osaka Prefectural Assembly, Kazunori Ohashi, said the party was unaware of his intended absence. On the following Monday, party secretary-general Nobuyuki Baba announced that the party had removed Hamada as a candidate, saying that his absence from the House in order to progress his re-election campaign was "extremely regrettable". Hamada submitted his resignation to the party on the same day, which was accepted the following day, 1 June 2016.

Hamada nominated for the July House of Councillors election as an independent candidate in the six-seat Tokyo at-large district. He came 16th in a field of 31 candidates, receiving just 0.5% of the vote. Meanwhile, Aoki won the merged Tottori-Shimane district with 62.7% of the vote in a three-candidate race.
