= 2010 Japanese House of Councillors election =

- July 11, 2010

121 of the 242 seats in the House of Councillors 122 seats needed for a majority
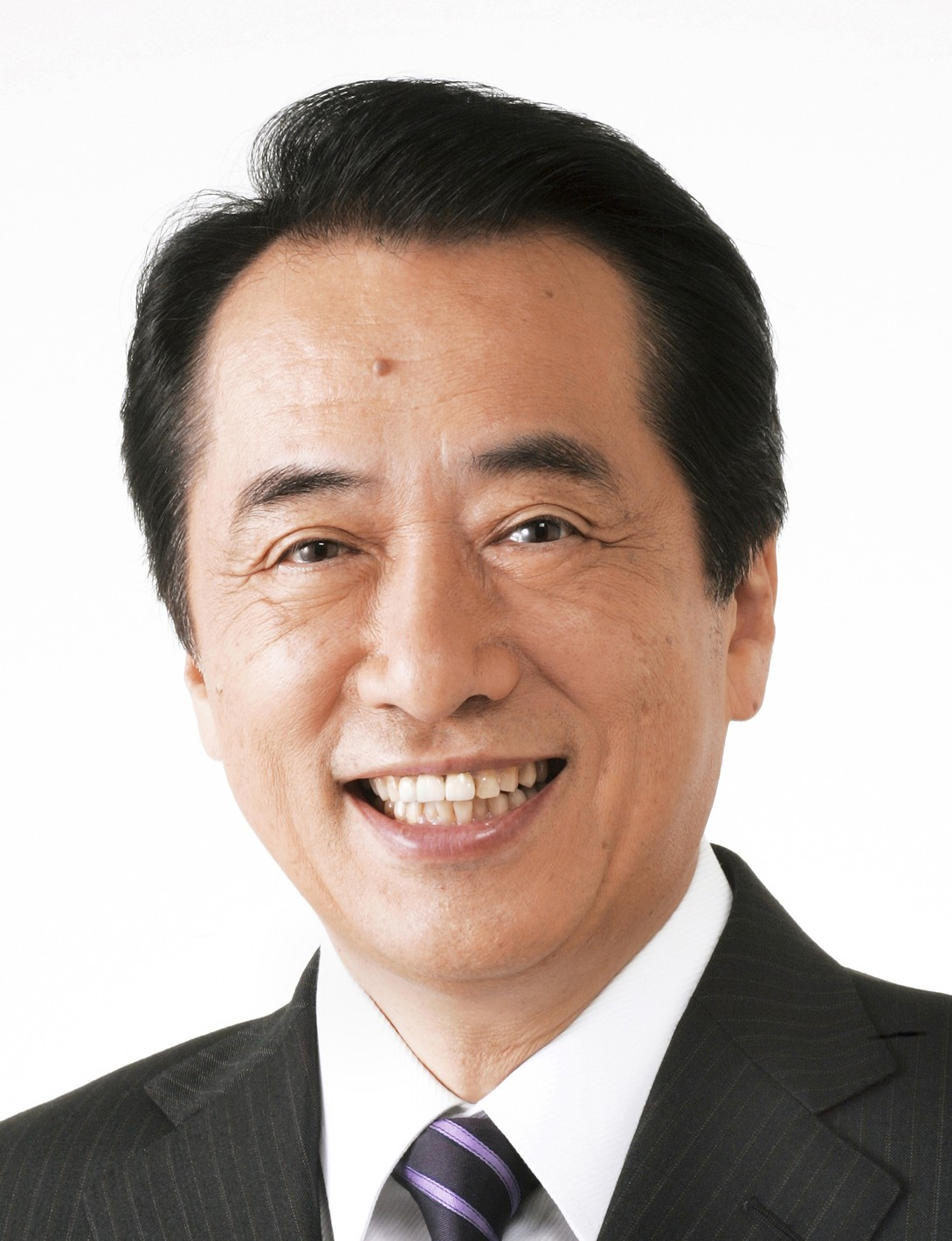

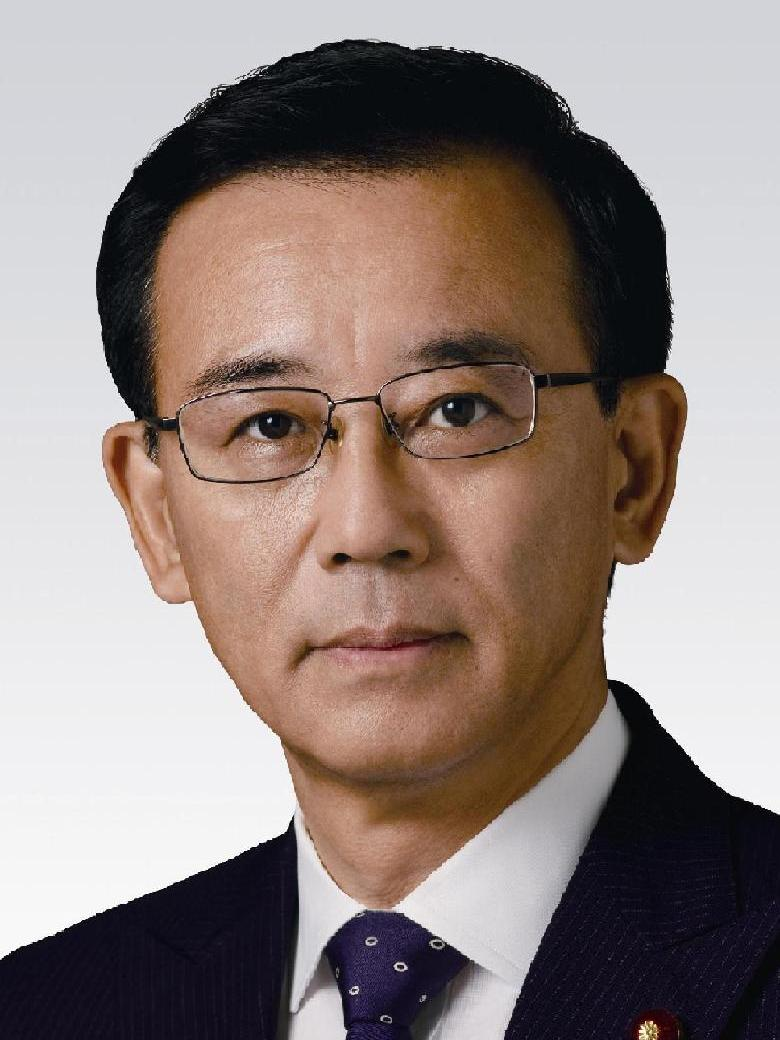

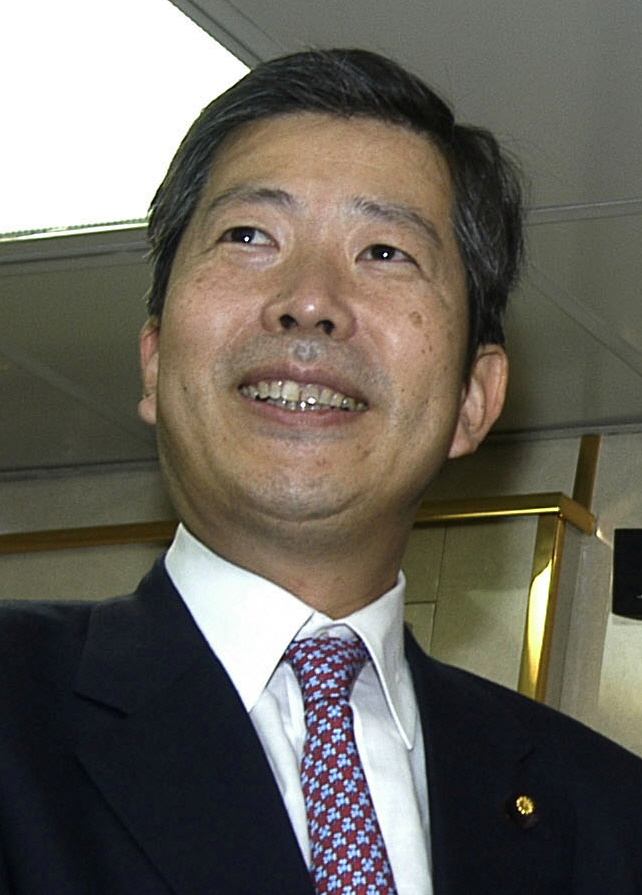

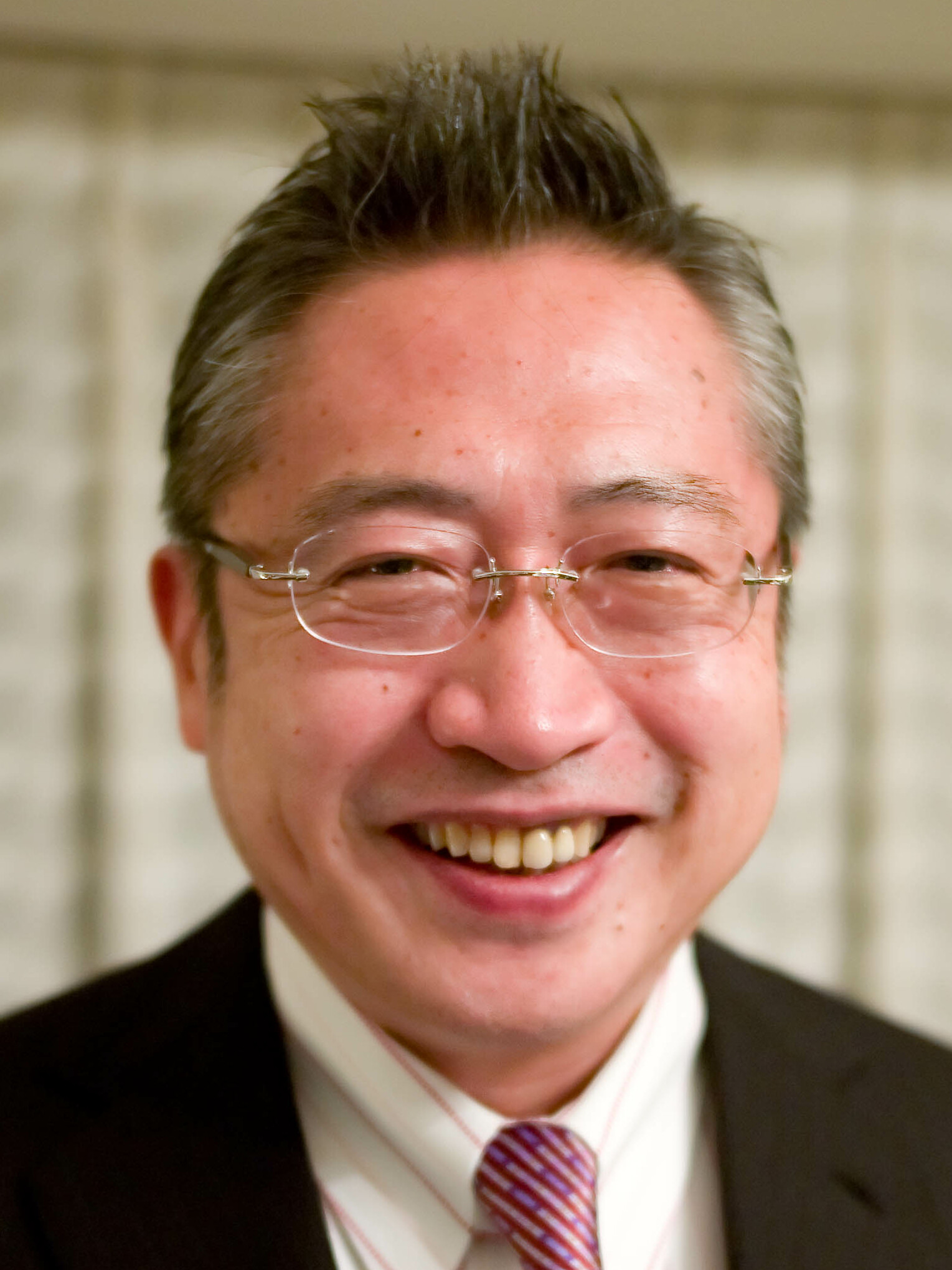

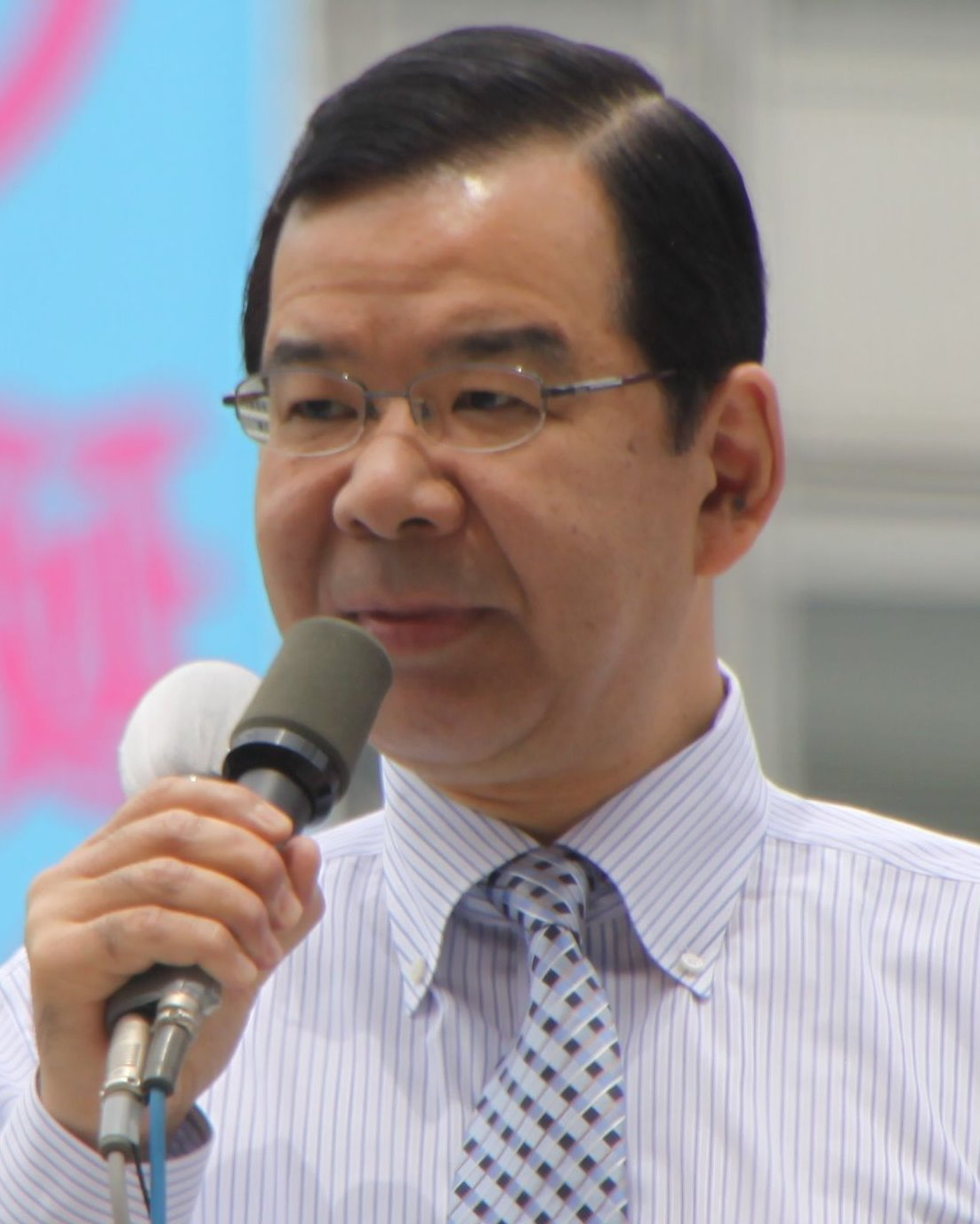

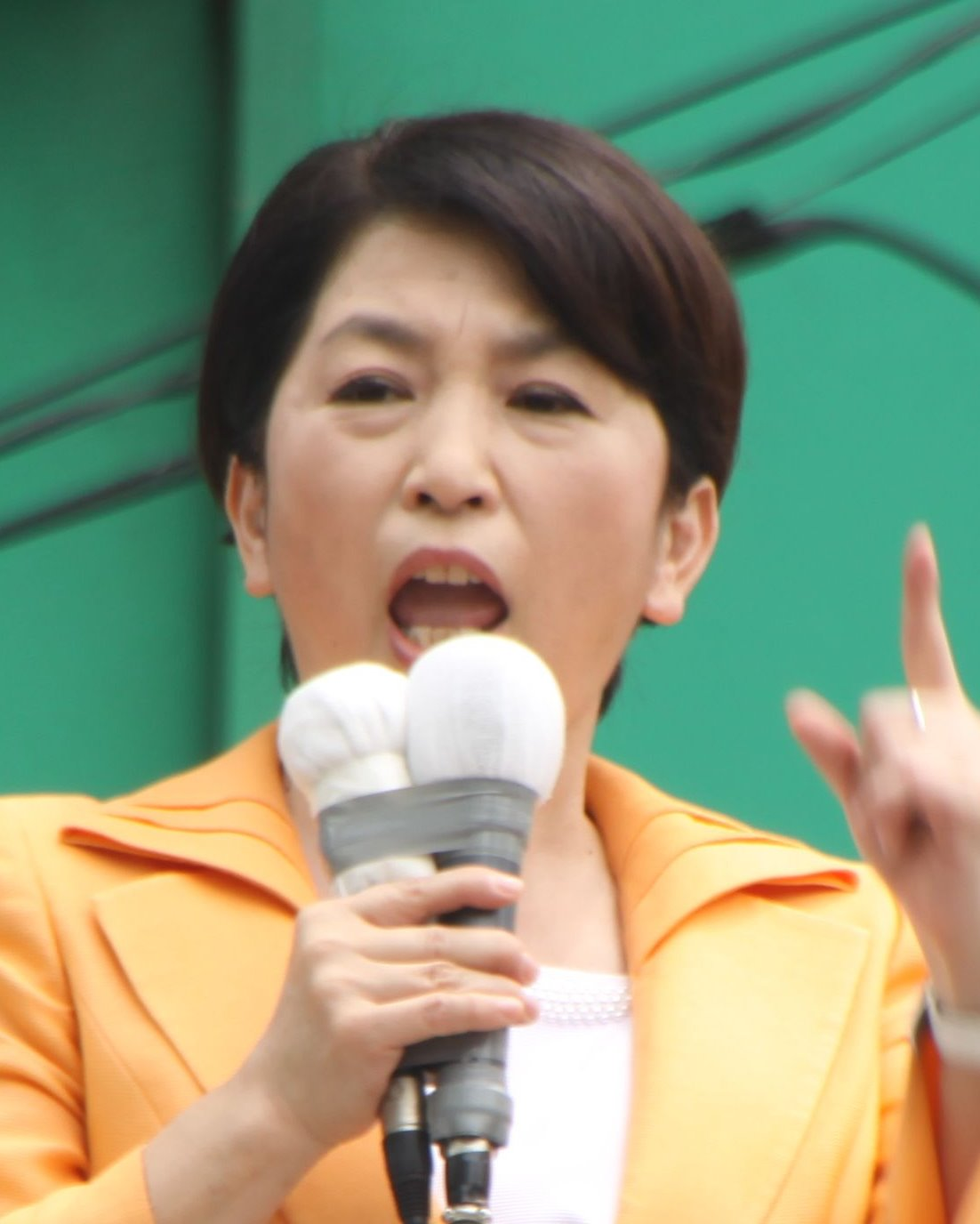

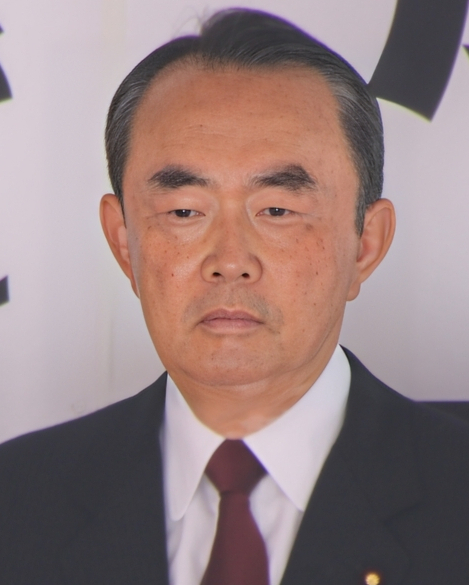

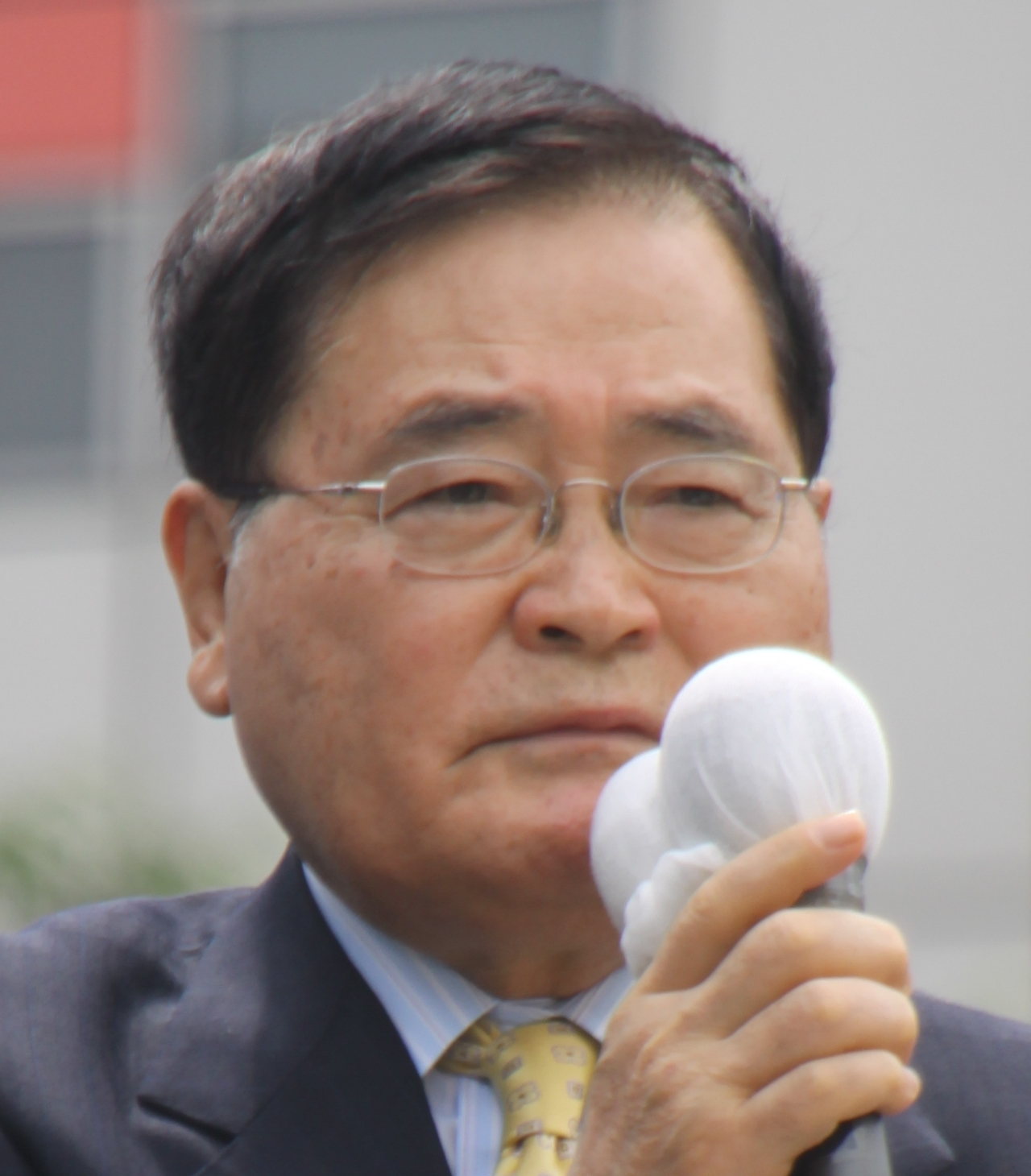

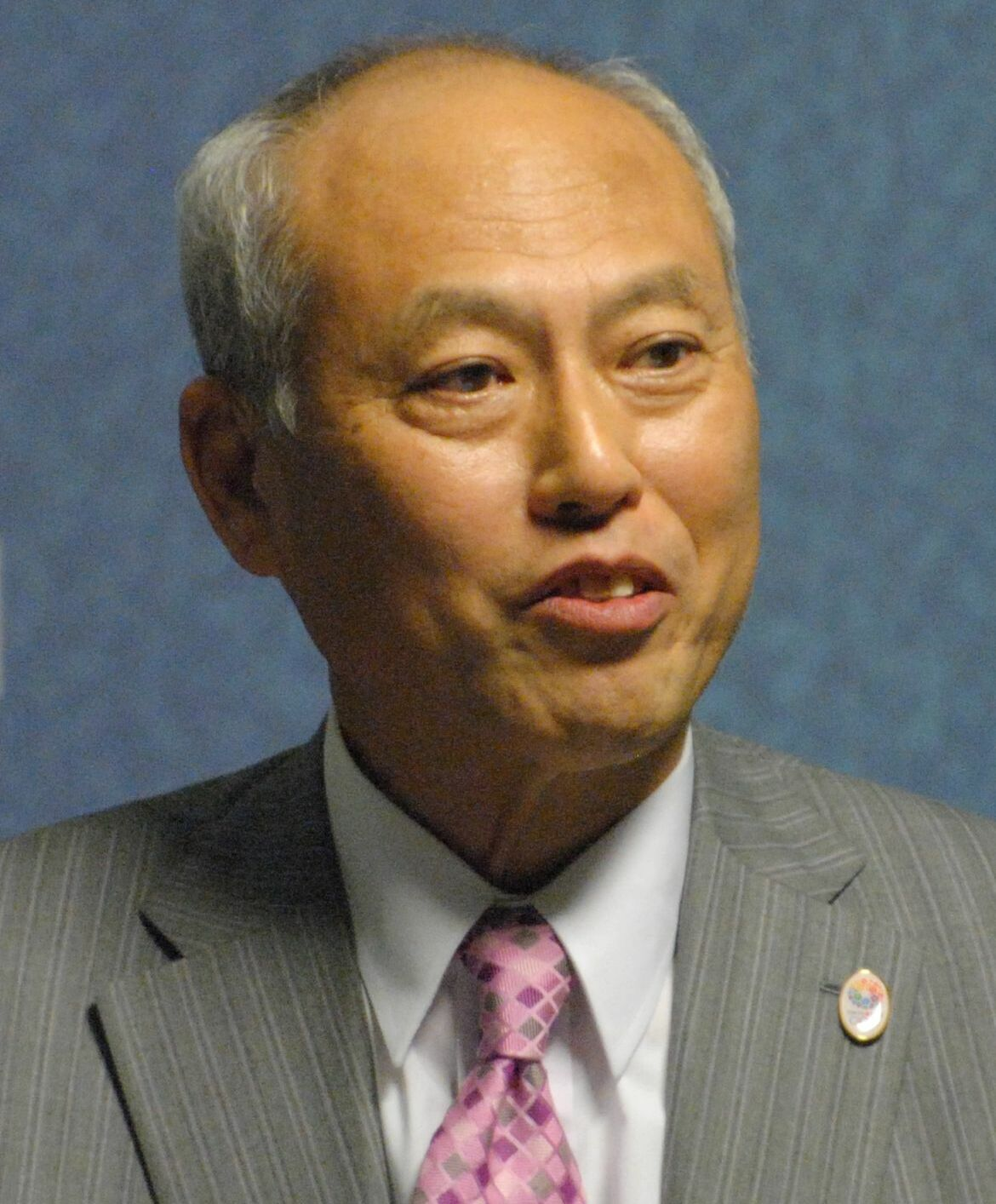
	First party	Second party	Third party
Leader	Naoto Kan	Sadakazu Tanigaki	Natsuo Yamaguchi
Party	Democratic	LDP	Komeito
Last election	109 seats	83 seats	20 seats
Seats won	44	51	9
Seats after	106	84	19
Seat change	▼3	▲1	▼1
Constituency vote	22,756,000	19,496,083	2,265,818
% and swing	38.97% (▼1.48pp)	33.38% (▲2.03pp)	3.88% (▼2.08pp)
National vote	18,450,139	14,071,671	7,639,433
% and swing	31.56% (▼7.92pp)	24.07% (▼4.01pp)	13.07% (▼0.11pp)
	Fourth party	Fifth party	Sixth party
Leader	Yoshimi Watanabe	Kazuo Shii	Mizuho Fukushima
Party	Your	JCP	Social Democratic
Last election	Did not exist	7 seats	5 seats
Seats won	10	3	2
Seats after	11	6	4
Seat change	New	▼1	▼1
Constituency vote	5,977,391	4,256,400	602,684
% and swing	10.24% (New)	7.29% (▼1.41pp)	1.03% (▼1.25pp)
National vote	7,943,649	3,563,557	2,242,735
% and swing	13.59% (New)	6.10% (▼1.38pp)	3.84% (▼0.63pp)
	Seventh party	Eighth party	Ninth party
Leader	Takeo Hiranuma	Shizuka Kamei	Yōichi Masuzoe
Party	Sunrise	People's New	New Renaissance
Last election	Did not exist	4 seats, 2.2%	Did not exist
Seats won	1	0	1
Seats after	3	3	2
Seat change	New	▼1	New
Constituency vote	328,475	167,555	625,431
% and swing	0.56% (New)	0.29% (▼1.58pp)	1.07% (New)
National vote	1,232,207	1,000,036	1,172,395
% and swing	2.11% (New)	1.71% (▼0.44pp)	2.01% (New)
- Constituency and proportional representation (bottom right) election result
President of the House of Councillors before election
Satsuki Eda
Democratic
Elected President of the House of Councillors
Takeo Nishioka
Democratic

House of Councillors elections were held in Japan on July 11, 2010. In the previous elections in 2007 the Liberal Democratic Party (LDP) had lost its majority to the Democratic Party (DPJ), which managed to gain the largest margin since its formation in 1996. The House of Councillors is elected by halves to six-year terms. The seats up for election in 2010 were last contested in the 2004 election.

== Background ==
On 11 June 2008, a non-binding censure motion was passed by parliament's opposition-controlled House of Councillors against then Prime Minister Yasuo Fukuda. Filed by the DPJ and two other parties, it was the first censure motion against a prime minister under Japan's post-war constitution. Ahead of the G8 summit, it attacked his handling of domestic issues including an unpopular medical plan and called for a snap election or his resignation. On 12 June a motion of confidence was passed by the lower house's ruling coalition to counter the censure. Fukuda abruptly announced he was retiring as leader. Taro Aso won the subsequent election, which was held on 22 September 2008.

In the 2009 lower house election, the DPJ gained an historic majority, being the first non-LDP party to hold a majority in that house since the LDP's formation and is scheduled to lead the second non-LDP government in the aforementioned time period (with upper house allies the Social Democratic Party of Japan and the People's New Party). Following the election, Aso resigned as LDP president. Sadakazu Tanigaki was elected the leader of LDP on September 28, 2009.

The House of Councillors election in 2010 was viewed as potentially leading to the extinction of the LDP. Some of the LDP's most popular councillors, such as Yoichi Masuzoe and Kaoru Yosano, left the party prior to the election. However, the DPJ's popularity had been negatively impacted by fundraising scandals surrounding its president Yukio Hatoyama and secretary general Ichiro Ozawa, both of whom resigned on June 2, 2010. Naoto Kan became prime minister after Hatoyama's resignation and proposed a controversial increase in the consumption tax to shore up Japanese public finances. The campaign season was only three weeks long, which frustrated efforts to have policy debates between the two major parties and the numerous third parties in the election.

=== Pre-election composition ===
↓
66	44	7	9	10	51	55
Coalition seats not up	DPJ seats up	O	NK	YP	LDP seats up	Opposition seats not up

== Results ==
The result of the election was declared on July 12, 2010. The ruling DPJ lost many of its seats and the opposition LDP gained more seats in comparison to the last election, held in 2007. Your Party performed well in this election, while the DPJ's junior coalition partner, the People's New Party, performed poorly.

Party	National			Constituency			Seats			
Party	Votes	%	Seats	Votes	%	Seats	Not up	Won	Total after	+/–
Democratic Party of Japan	18,450,139	31.56	16	22,756,000	38.97	28	62	44	106	–3
Liberal Democratic Party	14,071,671	24.07	12	19,496,083	33.38	39	33	51	84	+1
Your Party	7,943,649	13.59	7	5,977,391	10.24	3	1	10	11	New
New Komeito Party	7,639,433	13.07	6	2,265,818	3.88	3	10	9	19	–1
Japanese Communist Party	3,563,557	6.10	3	4,256,400	7.29	0	3	3	6	–1
Social Democratic Party	2,242,735	3.84	2	602,684	1.03	0	2	2	4	–1
Sunrise Party	1,232,207	2.11	1	328,475	0.56	0	2	1	3	New
New Renaissance Party	1,172,395	2.01	1	625,431	1.07	0	1	1	2	New
People's New Party	1,000,036	1.71	0	167,555	0.29	0	3	0	3	–1
Happiness Realization Party	229,026	0.39	0	291,810	0.50	0	1	0	1	New
Spirit of Japan Party	493,620	0.84	0	296,697	0.51	0	0	0	0	New
Women's Party	414,963	0.71	0				0	0	0	0
Other parties				22,150	0.04	0	0	0	0	–
Independents				1,314,313	2.25	0	3	0	3	–9
Total	58,453,431	100.00	48	58,400,807	100.00	73	121	121	242	0
Valid votes	58,453,996	97.02		58,400,808	96.92					
Invalid/blank votes	1,793,766	2.98		1,853,292	3.08					
Total votes	60,247,762	100.00		60,254,100	100.00					
Registered voters/turnout	104,029,135	57.91		104,029,135	57.92					
Source: Ministry of Internal Affairs and Communications, National Diet

=== DPJ nomination strategy in multi-member districts ===
DPJ secretary-general Ichirō Ozawa had decided on an offensive strategy for nominating candidates in multi-member districts (MMDs): The DPJ was to nominate two candidates in all MMDs with the exceptions of Niigata where an SDP-affiliated independent incumbent was in the race and Fukuoka where a PNP incumbent sought reelection. This strategy was reaffirmed after Ozawa's resignation in June 2010 even though the DPJ's support rate had significantly fallen by then and winning both seats in a SNTV two-member district requires a very high margin in terms of party votes and an equal distribution of votes on the two candidates.

The strategy failed: all two-member districts split seats evenly between DPJ and LDP in 2010. In some districts the party even risked losing both seats due to vote splitting, a danger that did not materialize in the election result.

The LDP on the other hand nominated only one candidate per MMD – exceptions being Miyagi, Chiba and Tokyo –, thus concentrating all LDP votes on one candidate.

The election results in MMDs gave 20 seats to the DPJ, 18 to the LDP, three to the Kōmeitō and three to Your Party. The only districts where the DPJ won two seats and an advantage in seats over the LDP were Tokyo (5 seats) where administrative reform minister Renhō received a record 1.7 million votes and Toshio Ogawa ranked fourth and DPJ stronghold Aichi (3 seats) where DPJ candidates only finished second and third behind LDP newcomer Masahito Fujikawa.

=== LDP gains ===
Part of the LDP victory were the results in the 29 single-member districts where the DPJ received roughly 7 million votes winning eight districts while the LDP received 8.25 million votes and 21 seats, among them seven pickups compared to the pre-election composition of the chamber:

- Aomori, Akita, Tottori and Nagasaki from the DPJ
- Kagawa and Tokushima from the NRP, both from former LDP members, and
- Tochigi which had been a two-member district until 2010 with seats held by DPJ and NRP.

The LDP also gained seven additional seats in two-member districts, but exclusively seats it had previously lost by party switchovers or resignations:

- in Hokkaidō from the Sunrise Party,
- in Niigata where Naoki Tanaka had switched parties together with his wife Makiko from an SDP-affiliated independent,
- in Gifu from an ex-LDP independent,
- in Nagano a vacant seat previously held by the LDP,
- in Hiroshima and Fukuoka from the PNP and
- only in Shizuoka directly from the DPJ where the Democrats had held both seats up because of the resignation of Yukiko Sakamoto in 2009 and the DPJ's victory in the resulting by-election.

The vote in the districts with three (Saitama, Chiba, Kanagawa, Aichi, Ōsaka) or five (Tōkyō) seats up went clearly to the DPJ with a 3.5 million vote edge over the LDP, but produced only a two-seat difference in the House of Councillors: the LDP won six, the DPJ eight seats.

If compared to the 2004 election when the same class of Councillors was last elected, the LDP only gained five prefectural district seats and lost three seats in the nationwide proportional representation.

=== Detailed results ===
Elected

Prefectural districts
Constituency	Previous members		Elected members		Votes	%	Status
Hokkaido & Tohoku
Hokkaido	Yoshio Nakagawa	SP	Gaku Hasegawa	LDP	948,267	34.3	LDP gain from SP
Hokkaido	Naoki Minezaki	DPJ	Eri Tokunaga	DPJ	708,523	25.6	DPJ hold
Aomori	Masami Tanabu	DPJ	Tsutomu Yamazaki	LDP	287,385	46.8	LDP gain from DPJ
Iwate	Ryo Shuhama	DPJ	Ryo Shuhama	DPJ	351,545	54.2	DPJ hold
Miyagi	Ichiro Ichikawa	Ind.	Yutaka Kumagai	LDP	265,343	26.8	LDP gain from Ind.
Miyagi	Mitsuru Sakurai	DPJ	Mitsuru Sakurai	DPJ	241,460	24.4	DPJ hold
Akita	Yoetsu Suzuki	DPJ	Hiroo Ishii	LDP	328,771	55.6	LDP gain from DPJ
Yamagata	Koichi Kishi	LDP	Koichi Kishi	LDP	263,987	43.6	LDP hold
Fukushima	Teruhiko Mashiko	DPJ	Teruhiko Mashiko	DPJ	340,947	34.4	DPJ hold
Fukushima	Mitsuhide Iwaki	LDP	Mitsuhide Iwaki	LDP	338,265	34.1	LDP hold
Kanto
Ibaraki	Hiroshi Okada	LDP	Hiroshi Okada	LDP	499,566	38.7	LDP hold
Ibaraki	Akira Gunji	DPJ	Akira Gunji	DPJ	307,022	23.8	DPJ hold
Tochigi	Susumu Yanase	DPJ	Michiko Ueno	LDP	499,566	38.7	LDP gain from DPJ
Tochigi	Tetsuro Yano	NRP	Seat abolished				NRP loss
Gunma	Hirofumi Nakasone	LDP	Hirofumi Nakasone	LDP	558,659	60.6	LDP hold
Gunma	Yukio Tomioka	DPJ	Seat abolished				DPJ loss
Saitama	Masakazu Sekiguchi	LDP	Masakazu Sekiguchi	LDP	655,028	20.6	LDP hold
Saitama	Makoto Nishida	Komei	Makoto Nishida	Komei	594,678	18.7	Komei hold
Saitama	Chiyako Shimada	DPJ	Motohiro Ōno	DPJ	557,298	17.5	DPJ hold
Chiba	Kazuyasu Shiina	LDP	Hiroyuki Konishi	LDP	545,632	20.2	LDP hold
Chiba	Wakako Hironaka	DPJ	Kuniko Inoguchi	DPJ	513,772	19.3	DPJ hold
Chiba	New seat		Kenichi Mizuno	YP	476,259	17.9	YP win
Tokyo	Renhō	DPJ	Renhō	DPJ	1,710,734	28.1	DPJ hold
Tokyo	Yuji Sawa	Komei	Toshiko Takeya	Komei	806,862	13.2	Komei hold
Tokyo	Masaharu Nakagawa	LDP	Masaharu Nakagawa	LDP	711,171	11.7	LDP hold
Tokyo	Toshio Ogawa	DPJ	Toshio Ogawa	DPJ	696,672	11.4	DPJ hold
Tokyo	New seat		Kota Matsuda	YP	656,029	10.8	YP win
Kanagawa	Akio Koizumi	LDP	Akio Koizumi	LDP	982,220	25.2	LDP hold
Kanagawa	Keiko Chiba	DPJ	Kenji Nakanishi	YP	788,729	20.2	YP gain from DPJ
Kanagawa	Yoichi Kaneko	DPJ	Yoichi Kaneko	DPJ	745,143	19.1	DPJ hold
Chubu
Niigata	Naoki Tanaka	DPJ	Naoki Tanaka	DPJ	439,289	37.9	DPJ hold
Niigata	Masamichi Kondo	Ind.	Yaichi Nakahara	LDP	412,217	35.5	LDP gain from Ind.
Toyama	Tsunenori Kawai	LDP	Kōtarō Nogami	LDP	322,739	56.2	LDP hold
Ishikawa	Naoki Okada	LDP	Naoki Okada	LDP	304,511	55.5	LDP hold
Fukui	Masaaki Yamazaki	LDP	Masaaki Yamazaki	LDP	212,605	51.2	LDP hold
Yamanashi	Azuma Koshiishi	DPJ	Azuma Koshiishi	DPJ	187,010	43.0	DPJ hold
Nagano	Vacant	LDP	Kenta Wakabayashi	LDP	293,539	26.4	LDP hold
Nagano	Toshimi Kitazawa	DPJ	Toshimi Kitazawa	DPJ	290,027	26.1	DPJ hold
Gifu	Iwao Matsuda	Ind.	Takeyuki Watanabe	LDP	425,594	44.0	LDP gain from Ind.
Gifu	Yasuo Yamashita	DPJ	Yoshiharu Komiyama	DPJ	229,225	23.7	DPJ hold
Shizuoka	Hirokazu Tsuchida	DPJ	Shigeki Iwai	LDP	554,459	32.3	LDP gain from DPJ
Shizuoka	Yuji Fujimoto	DPJ	Yuji Fujimoto	DPJ	485,507	28.2	DPJ hold
Aichi	Katsuhito Asano	LDP	Masahito Fujikawa	LDP	918,187	28.6	LDP hold
Aichi	Taisuke Sato	DPJ	Yoshitaka Saitō	DPJ	750,723	23.4	DPJ hold
Aichi	Yoshitake Kimata	DPJ	Misako Yasui	DPJ	676,681	21.1	DPJ hold
Mie	Hirokazu Shiba	DPJ	Hirokazu Shiba	DPJ	360,697	40.6	DPJ hold
Kansai
Shiga	Kumiko Hayashi	DPJ	Kumiko Hayashi	DPJ	317,756	48.6	DPJ hold
Kyoto	Tetsuro Fukuyama	DPJ	Tetsuro Fukuyama	DPJ	374,550	34.3	DPJ hold
Kyoto	Satoshi Ninoyu	LDP	Satoshi Ninoyu	LDP	308,296	28.2	LDP hold
Osaka	Eiichi Yamashita	Komei	Hirotaka Ishikawa	Komei	864,278	22.1	Komei hold
Osaka	Issei Kitagawa	LDP	Issei Kitagawa	LDP	706,986	18.1	LDP hold
Osaka	Motoyuki Odachi	DPJ	Motoyuki Odachi	DPJ	698,933	17.9	DPJ hold
Hyogo	Shinsuke Suematsu	LDP	Shinsuke Suematsu	LDP	694,459	29.4	LDP hold
Hyogo	Shunichi Mizuoka	DPJ	Shunichi Mizuoka	DPJ	515,541	21.8	DPJ hold
Nara	Kiyoshige Maekawa	DPJ	Kiyoshige Maekawa	DPJ	308,490	47.6	DPJ hold
Wakayama	Yōsuke Tsuruho	LDP	Yōsuke Tsuruho	LDP	273,960	56.8	LDP hold
Chugoku
Tottori	Kotaro Tamura	DPJ	Kazuyuki Hamada	LDP	158,445	50.8	LDP gain from DPJ
Shimane	Mikio Aoki	LDP	Kazuhiko Aoki	LDP	222,448	52.9	LDP hold
Okayama	Satsuki Eda	DPJ	Satsuki Eda	DPJ	474,280	54.8	DPJ hold
Hiroshima	Ikuo Kamei	PNP	Yoichi Miyazawa	LDP	547,845	45.5	LDP gain from PNP
Hiroshima	Minoru Yanagida	DPJ	Minoru Yanagida	DPJ	295,276	24.5	DPJ hold
Yamaguchi	Nobuo Kishi	LDP	Nobuo Kishi	LDP	421,055	57.8	LDP hold
Shikoku
Tokushima	Masakatsu Koike	NRP	Yūsuke Nakanishi	LDP	142,763	38.3	LDP gain from NRP
Kagawa	Toshio Yamauchi	NRP	Yoshihiko Isozaki	LDP	236,134	51.4	LDP gain from NRP
Ehime	Junzo Yamamoto	LDP	Junzo Yamamoto	LDP	351,624	52.7	LDP hold
Kochi	Hajime Hirota	DPJ	Hajime Hirota	DPJ	137,306	37.5	DPJ hold
Kyushu & Okinawa
Fukuoka	Gotaro Yoshimura	PNP	Satoshi Ōie	LDP	774,618	35.3	LDP gain from PNP
Fukuoka	Tsutomu Okubo	DPJ	Tsutomu Okubo	DPJ	673,749	30.7	DPJ hold
Saga	Hiromi Iwanaga	LDP	Takamaro Fukuoka	LDP	256,673	60.5	LDP hold
Nagasaki	Tadashi Inuzuka	DPJ	Genjirō Kaneko	LDP	344,182	48.8	LDP gain from DPJ
Kumamoto	Yoshifumi Matsumura	LDP	Yoshifumi Matsumura	LDP	393,674	44.2	LDP hold
Oita	Shinya Adachi	DPJ	Shinya Adachi	DPJ	294,286	48.7	DPJ hold
Miyazaki	Shinpei Matsushita	LDP	Shinpei Matsushita	LDP	303,711	58.6	LDP hold
Kagoshima	Tetsuro Nomura	LDP	Tetsuro Nomura	LDP	437,740	55.0	LDP hold
Okinawa	Aiko Shimajiri	LDP	Aiko Shimajiri	LDP	258,946	47.6	LDP hold

Proportional representation results
Party	Votes	Seats	Elected member	Pref. votes
DPJ	18,450,140 (31.6%)	16	Yoshifu Arita	373,834
DPJ	18,450,140 (31.6%)	16	Ryoko Tani	352,594
DPJ	18,450,140 (31.6%)	16	Masayuki Naoshima	207,821
DPJ	18,450,140 (31.6%)	16	Masao Kobayashi	207,227
DPJ	18,450,140 (31.6%)	16	Mitsuyoshi Yanagisawa	159,325
DPJ	18,450,140 (31.6%)	16	Michihiro Ishibashi	150,113
DPJ	18,450,140 (31.6%)	16	Shoji Namba	144,782
DPJ	18,450,140 (31.6%)	16	Yataro Tsuda	143,048
DPJ	18,450,140 (31.6%)	16	Masayoshi Nataniya	139,006
DPJ	18,450,140 (31.6%)	16	Takashi Esaki	133,248
DPJ	18,450,140 (31.6%)	16	Kenzo Fujisue	128,511
DPJ	18,450,140 (31.6%)	16	Toshiyuki Kato	120,987
DPJ	18,450,140 (31.6%)	16	Takeshi Maeda	118,248
DPJ	18,450,140 (31.6%)	16	Kaoru Tashiro	113,468
DPJ	18,450,140 (31.6%)	16	Shinkun Haku	111,376
DPJ	18,450,140 (31.6%)	16	Masami Nishimura	100,932
LDP	14,071,671 (24.0%)	12	Satsuki Katayama	299,036
LDP	14,071,671 (24.0%)	12	Yukari Sato	278,312
LDP	14,071,671 (24.0%)	12	Eriko Yamatani	254,469
LDP	14,071,671 (24.0%)	12	Emiko Takagai	210,443
LDP	14,071,671 (24.0%)	12	Junko Mihara	168,342
LDP	14,071,671 (24.0%)	12	Hirohiko Nakamura	156,467
LDP	14,071,671 (24.0%)	12	Masashi Waki	148,779
LDP	14,071,671 (24.0%)	12	Motoyuki Fujii	145,771
LDP	14,071,671 (24.0%)	12	Kenji Kosaka	135,448
LDP	14,071,671 (24.0%)	12	Toshiei Mizuochi	131,657
LDP	14,071,671 (24.0%)	12	Takashi Uto	121,441
LDP	14,071,671 (24.0%)	12	Kiyomi Akaishi	108,258
YP	7,943,649 (13.6%)	7	Shibata Takumi	87,863
YP	7,943,649 (13.6%)	7	Katsuhiko Eguchi	86,299
YP	7,943,649 (13.6%)	7	Hiroshi Ueno	52,051
YP	7,943,649 (13.6%)	7	Sukeshiro Terata	45,846
YP	7,943,649 (13.6%)	7	Jiro Ono	43,012
YP	7,943,649 (13.6%)	7	Shinji Oguma	37,222
YP	7,943,649 (13.6%)	7	Fumiki Sakurauchi	37,191
Komei	7,639,432 (13.1%)	6	Kōzō Akino	836,120
Komei	7,639,432 (13.1%)	6	Hiroaki Nagasawa	630,775
Komei	7,639,432 (13.1%)	6	Shinichi Yokoyama	579,793
Komei	7,639,432 (13.1%)	6	Masaaki Taniai	544,217
Komei	7,639,432 (13.1%)	6	Masayoshi Hamada	503,177
Komei	7,639,432 (13.1%)	6	Kiyohiro Araki	457,700
JCP	3,563,556 (6.1%)	3	Tadayoshi Ichida	83,806
JCP	3,563,556 (6.1%)	3	Tomoko Tamura	45,668
JCP	3,563,556 (6.1%)	3	Mikishi Daimon	43,897
SDP	2,242,735 (3.8%)	2	Mizuho Fukushima	381,554
SDP	2,242,735 (3.8%)	2	Tadatomo Yoshida	130,745
SP	1,232,207 (2.1%)	1	Toranosuke Katayama	117,636
NRP	1,172,395 (2.0%)	1	Hiroyuki Arai	65,250
