= Yoshihiro Kawakami =

Japanese politician

- 川上 義博
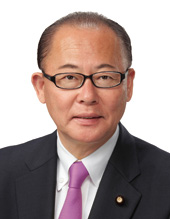
- Official portrait, 2012

Member of the House of Councillors
- In office 29 July 2007 – 28 July 2013
- Preceded by: Takayoshi Tsuneda
- Succeeded by: Shoji Maitachi
- Constituency: Tottori at-large

Member of the House of Representatives
- In office 11 November 2003 – 8 August 2005
- Preceded by: Hideyuki Aizawa
- Succeeded by: Ryosei Akazawa
- Constituency: Tottori 2nd

Member of the Tottori Prefectural Assembly
- In office 23 April 1995 – 22 April 2003
- Constituency: Tōhaku District

Personal details
- Born: 26 October 1950 (age 75) Kotoura, Tottori, Japan
- Party: Independent (2003–2004; 2005–2007; 2013–present)
- Other political affiliations: Liberal Democratic (before 2003; 2004–2005); Democratic (2007–2013)
- Education: Aoyama Gakuin University

Yoshihiro Kawakami (川上 義博, Kawakami Yoshihiro; born October 26, 1950) is a Japanese politician of the Democratic Party of Japan, a member of the House of Councillors in the Diet (national legislature).

A native of Tōhaku District, Tottori and graduate of Aoyama Gakuin University, he was elected to the House of Councillors for the first time in 2003 after serving in the assembly of Tottori Prefecture for two terms. He lost his seat in 2005 but was re-elected in 2007.
