= Kazuhiko Aoki (politician) =

Japanese politician

- 青木 一彦
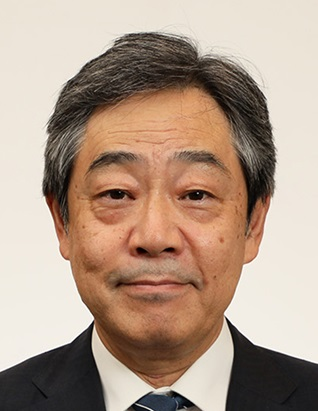
- Official portrait, 2024

Deputy Chief Cabinet Secretary (Political affairs, House of Councillors)
- In office 1 October 2024 – 21 October 2025
- Prime Minister: Shigeru Ishiba
- Preceded by: Hiroshi Moriya
- Succeeded by: Kei Satō

Member of the House of Councillors
- Incumbent
- Assumed office 26 July 2010
- Preceded by: Mikio Aoki
- Constituency: Shimane at-large (2010–2016); Tottori-Shimane at-large (2016–present)

Personal details
- Born: 25 March 1961 (age 65) Taisha, Shimane, Japan
- Party: Liberal Democratic
- Parent: Mikio Aoki (father)
- Education: Waseda University
- Website: www.aokikazuhiko.jp

Kazuhiko Aoki (青木 一彦, Aoki Kazuhiko; born 25 March 1961) is a Japanese politician who serves as Secretary General for the Liberal Democratic Party in the House of Councillors since 2026. He was Deputy Chief Cabinet Secretary under the Ishiba cabinet from 2024 to 2025.

After an earlier career working for a television broadcasting company, he entered the field of politics, serving as secretary to his politician father Mikio Aoki from 1999. In 2010 he succeeded his father as a member in the House of Councillors for the Shimane at-large district. Aoki was re-elected to the House in July 2016 as the member for the merged Tottori-Shimane at-large district. He is affiliated to the revisionist lobby Nippon Kaigi.

== Early life and pre-political career ==
Aoki was born in the town of Taisha (now a part of Izumo city) in Shimane Prefecture on 25 March 1961. His father Mikio Aoki is a veteran politician within the prefecture, having served five terms in the Shimane Prefectural Assembly from 1967 to 1986 before representing the prefecture in the House of Councillors in the national Diet for four consecutive terms from 1986 as a member for the Shimane at-large district.

Aoki attended Taisha High School in Shimane and graduated from Waseda University with a bachelor's degree in education in 1985. After graduating he joined the Fuji Television before moving to the San-in Chūō Television Broadcasting company in Shimane a year later.

== Political career ==
In 2000 Aoki left San-in Chūō to become a secretary to his father, who was serving in the role of Chief Cabinet Secretary in the Liberal Democratic Party's (LDP) government at the time. When Mikio was replaced as Chief Cabinet Secretary the following year, Kazuhiko remained as his father's official secretary.

=== First term as Councillor (2010-2016) ===
In January 2010 Mikio Aoki, who was 76 years of age, expressed his intention to seek a fifth six-year term in the House of Councillors at the election to be held in the middle of the year. He received official LDP backing from party leader Sadakazu Tanigaki, despite some people within the party wanting for him to step aside in favour of a younger candidate. However, Mikio suffered a stroke on 13 May 2010 while campaigning in Unnan city and informed LDP officials in Shimane the following day that he would have to abandon his campaign. At this time Kazuhiko's name was immediately raised as a replacement, and he later received the official nomination to contest the Shimane district at the July 2010 election. In the election he received 52.9% of the vote in a four-candidate contest.

During his first term as a Councillor, Aoki has served on the House's Land and Transport Committee, Administration Oversight Committee and the Special Committee on Regional Issues and Consumer Affairs. In October 2012 he became a deputy chairman of the LDP's house committee on Diet policy. In February 2013 he became a director of the House's Budget Committee.

In September 2014 Aoki was appointed by Prime Minister Shinzo Abe as a parliamentary vice-minister for Land, Infrastructure, Transport and Tourism alongside Kenichiro Ueno and Takashi Ōtsuka. He retained the role in Abe's next cabinet that was formed after the December 2014 House of Representatives election, but was replaced during a shuffle in October 2015.

In July 2015 Aoki was one of six LDP Councillors from rural districts who were opposed to the party's policy of merging smaller districts to address the problem of vote malapportionment. Aoki and the other Councillors exited the House before a vote on a bill that merged Aoki's Shimane district with the neighbouring Tottori at-large district, the two smallest districts in the country, amongst other changes to district representation.

=== 2016 re-election campaign ===
Following the 2015 electoral reform intended to address disproportion in voter representation, Aoki's Shimane district was merged with the neighbouring Tottori at-large district to create the Tottori-Shimane at-large district. Tottori was represented by Kazuyuki Hamada, who was elected in 2010 as an LDP candidate but defected to an opposing party a year later. As the only incumbent LDP member in the new district, Aoki received the party's nomination to contest the newly merged district at the July 2016 election and an endorsement from Komeito, the LDP's junior coalition partner. In the election Aoki received 62.7% of the vote to defeat Hirohiko Fukushima, a nominally independent candidate who was jointly endorsed by the main opposition parties.

=== Later career ===
Aoki played an important role in the campaign team for Shigeru Ishiba in the September 2024 LDP presidential election. After Ishiba was elected and subsequently appointed prime minister, he made Aoki a Deputy Chief Cabinet Secretary.

After the Ishiba cabinet stepped down in October 2025, Aoki was chosen as chairman of the Committee on Rules and Administration in the House of Councillors. He was involved in managing the Diet during the Takaichi cabinet. He was appointed secretary general for the LDP in the House of Councillors by the chairman Masaji Matsuyama in September 2026.

Political offices
Preceded by Hiroshi Moriya	Deputy Chief Cabinet Secretary (Political affairs, House of Councillors); 2024–2025	Succeeded by Kei Satō
House of Councillors
Preceded by Takao Makino	Chairman of the Committee on Rules and Administration; 2025–2026	Succeeded by Masahito Fujikawa
Preceded by Shinpei Matsushita	Chairman of the Special Committee on Official Development Assistance; 2021–2022	Succeeded by Junko Mihara
Party political offices
Preceded by Junichi Ishii	Secretary General for the Liberal Democratic Party in the House of Councillors; 2026—present	Incumbent
