= Ryosei Akazawa =

Japanese politician

- 赤沢 亮正
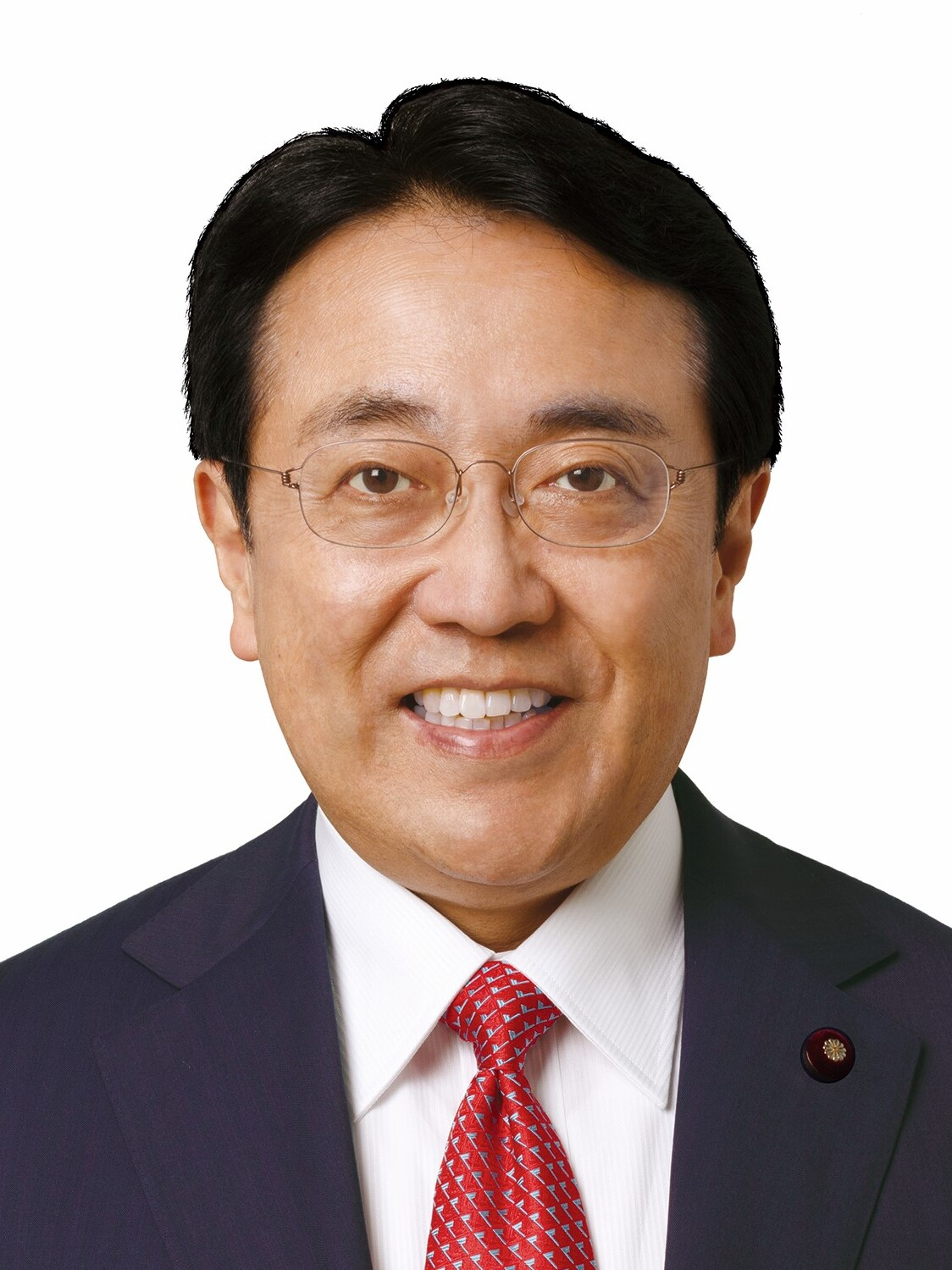
- Official portrait, 2023

Minister of Economy, Trade and Industry
- Incumbent
- Assumed office 21 October 2025
- Prime Minister: Sanae Takaichi
- Preceded by: Yoji Muto

Minister of State for Economic and Fiscal Policy
- In office 1 October 2024 – 21 October 2025
- Prime Minister: Shigeru Ishiba
- Preceded by: Yoshitaka Shindō
- Succeeded by: Minoru Kiuchi

Member of the House of Representatives
- Incumbent
- Assumed office 11 September 2005
- Preceded by: Yoshihiro Kawakami
- Constituency: Tottori 2nd

Personal details
- Born: 18 December 1960 (age 65) Bunkyō, Tokyo, Japan
- Party: Liberal Democratic
- Education: University of Tokyo; Cornell University
- Website: 赤沢亮正公式ホームページ

Ryōsei Akazawa (赤沢 亮正, Akazawa Ryōsei; born 18 December 1960) is a Japanese politician of the Liberal Democratic Party and member of the House of Representatives in the Diet (national legislature), representing the Tottori 2nd district in Tottori Prefecture.

== Early life ==
Akazawa was born into a former samurai family. His great-grandfather, Kohei, was a samurai who served the Hachisuka Clan, the Lords of Tokushima, and later became an industrialist. In the 1890s, he moved to what is now Akazawa's constituency to build a railway line. Akazawa's grandfather, Masamichi Akazawa, studied at the Faculty of Law at the University of Tokyo (UTokyo) and served as a parliamentarian for over two decades. He held the position of Minister for Home Affairs in Hayato Ikeda's cabinet.

Akazawa grew up in Bunkyō, Tokyo, and attended the Junior and Senior High School at Komaba. He went on to study law at UTokyo, following in his grandfather's footsteps. After graduating, Akazawa joined the civil service at the Ministry of Transport. In 1985, he had a life-changing experience when a Boeing 747 crashed with 524 people on board, killing all but four. He was working at the Japan Civil Aviation Bureau at the time, and his team was directly responsible for handling the aftermath of the accident. Another disaster he dealt with at the Ministry was the Great Hanshin Earthquake in 1995. After experiencing these events, Akazawa developed a strong sense that saving lives and managing risk were his primary missions.

Akazawa earned an MBA from Cornell University in the United States in 1991.

== Political career ==
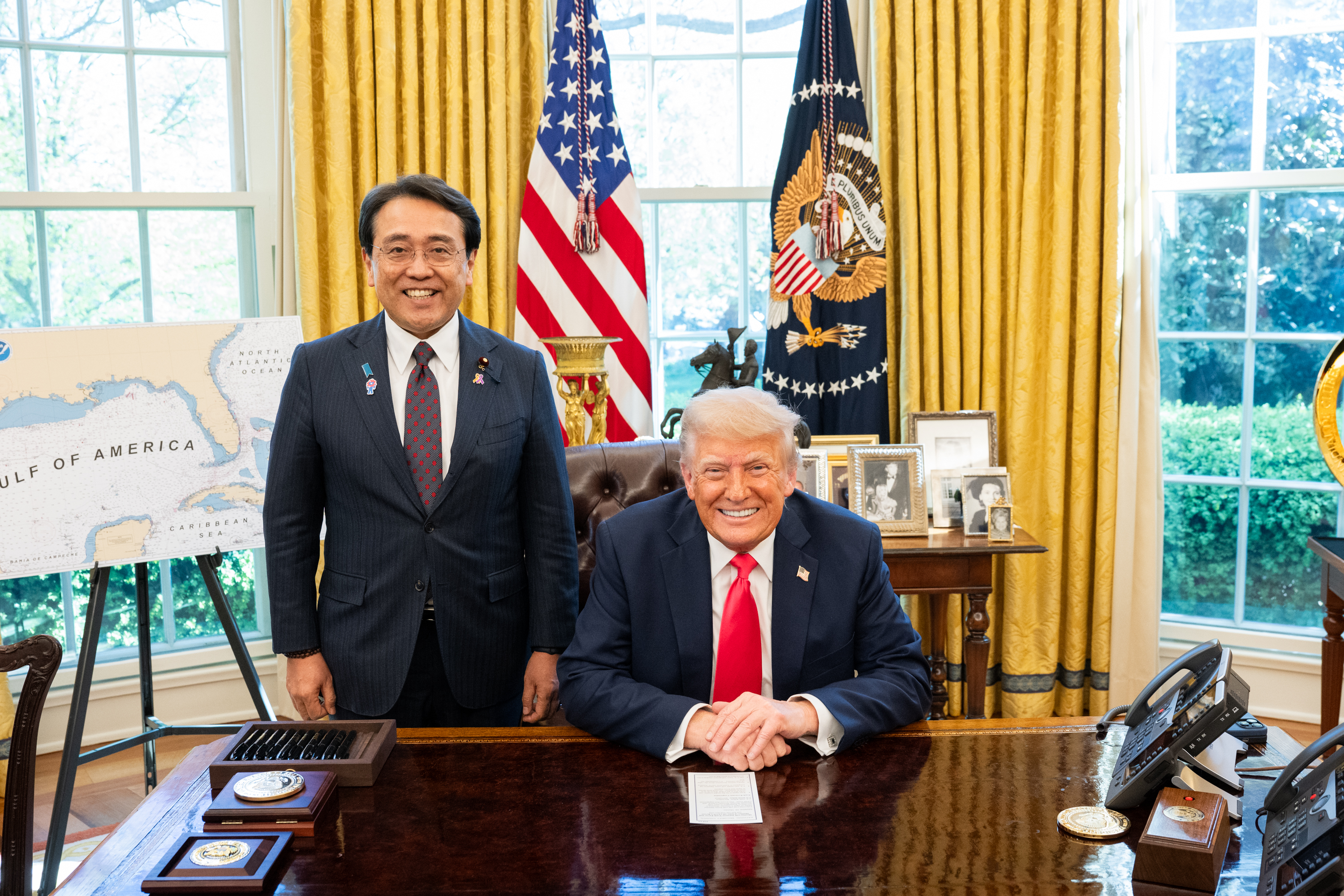
Akazawa with Donald Trump (at the White House on 16 April 2025)

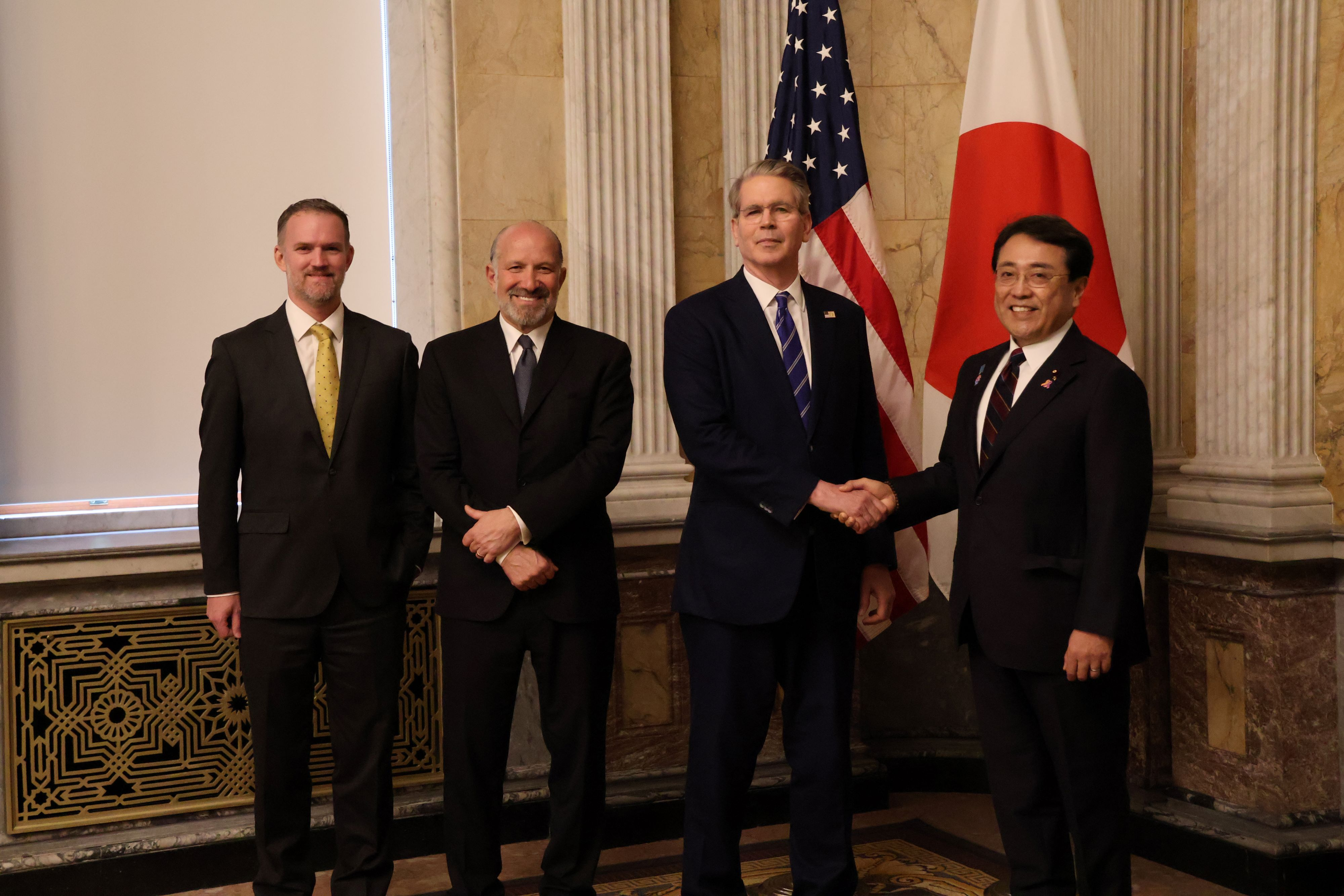
Akazawa with Scott Bessent, Howard Lutnick and Jamieson Greer (1 May 2025)

Akazawa was elected to the House of Representatives for the first time in the 2005 Japanese general election where he was one of the so-called "Koizumi Children" elected amid the popularity of Prime Minister Junichiro Koizumi. He was re-elected in the 2009 general election and the 2012 general election, and every election since. As of 2025, he is the current representative of the Tottori 2nd electorate.

Akazawa gained some notoriety in August 2011 after berating Economy Minister Banri Kaieda for twenty minutes on the floor of the Diet over the ministry's handling of the Fukushima disaster, ultimately bringing Kaieda to tears. Kaieda resigned several days later.

In October 2024, he was appointed Minister of Economic Revitalization, Minister in Charge of New Capitalism, Minister in Charge of Wage Improvement, Minister in Charge of Startups, Minister in Charge of All-Generation Social Security Reform, Minister in Charge of Infectious Disease Crisis Management, and Minister in Charge of Preparation for the Establishment of the Disaster Prevention Agency.

Ever since he was first elected, Akazawa has been known as the closest aide to Prime Minister Ishiba, who is elected from the other constituency in Tottori prefecture. Akazawa refers to himself as Premier Ishiba’s left-hand person, explaining on his post on X that calling himself the Prime Minister’s right-hand would feel too arrogant, while aide would sound as though he were the premier's brain.

== Honours ==
- Netherlands: Grand Officer of the Order of Orange-Nassau (29 October 2014)

== Election history ==
Election	Age	District	Political party	Number of votes	election results
2005 Japanese general election	44	Tottori 2nd district	LDP	64,132	Won
2009 Japanese general election	48	Tottori 2nd district	LDP	84,659	Won
2012 Japanese general election	51	Tottori 2nd district	LDP	87,395	Won
2014 Japanese general election	53	Tottori 2nd district	LDP	76,579	Won
2017 Japanese general election	56	Tottori 2nd district	LDP	72,827	Won
2021 Japanese general election	60	Tottori 2nd district	LDP	75,005	Won
2024 Japanese general election	63	Tottori 2nd district	LDP	81,526	Won
2026 Japanese general election	65	Tottori 2nd district	LDP	67,736	Won
