= Kotaro Tamura =

Japanese politician

- 田村 耕太郎
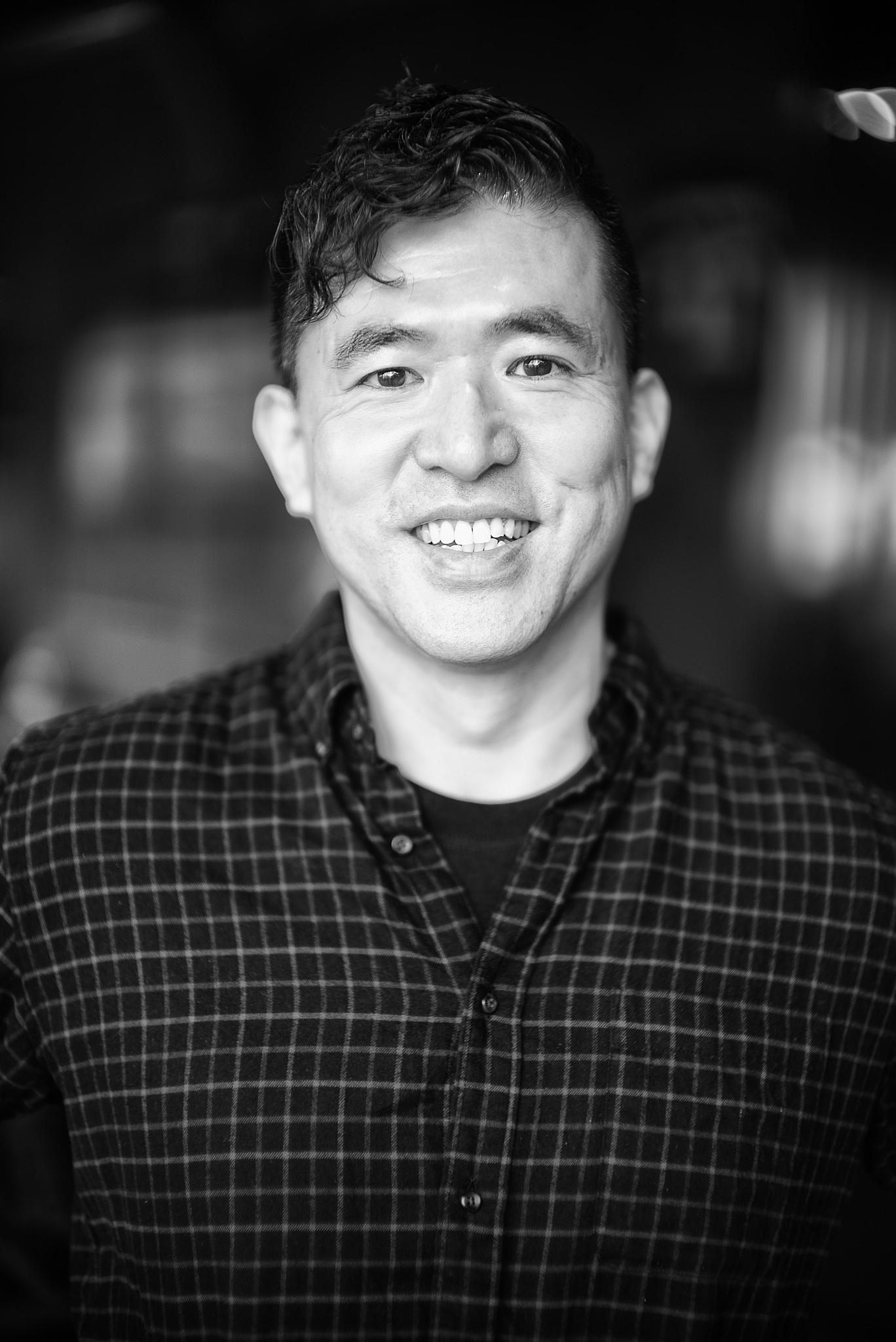
- Tamura in 2015

Member of the House of Councillors
- In office 28 October 2002 – 25 July 2010
- Preceded by: Shigenobu Sakano
- Succeeded by: Kazuyuki Hamada
- Constituency: Tottori at-large

Personal details
- Born: 23 July 1963 (age 63) Tottori City, Tottori, Japan
- Party: Independent (1998–2002; 2009–2010)
- Other political affiliations: LDP (2002–2009); DPJ (2010)
- Education: Waseda University; Keio University; Yale University; Duke University; University of Tokyo

Kotaro Tamura (田村 耕太郎, Tamura Kōtarō; born July 23, 1963) is a Japanese former politician of the Liberal Democratic Party, and a member of the House of Councillors in the Diet (2002–2010). He was a member of Prime Minister Abe's government, serving as his Parliamentary Secretary in the Cabinet Office of Economic and Fiscal Policy, where he worked toward opening up Japanese businesses to foreign investment. A native of Tottori, he received his BA from Waseda University, his MBA from Keio University, his MA from Yale, and his LLM from Duke Law School. He was elected to the House of Councillors for the first time in 2002.
