= Shōji Maitachi =

Japanese politician

- 舞立 昇治
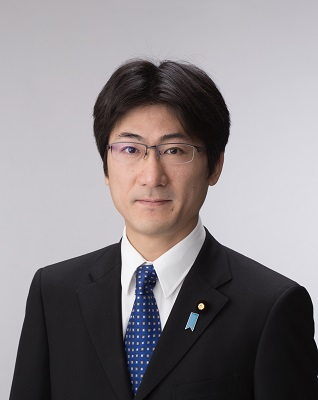
- Official portrait, 2018

Member of the House of Councillors
- Incumbent
- Assumed office 29 July 2013
- Preceded by: Yoshihiro Kawakami
- Constituency: Tottori at-large (2013–2019); Tottori-Shimane at-large (2019–2025); National PR (2025–present)

Personal details
- Born: 13 August 1975 (age 51) Hiezu, Tottori, Japan
- Party: Liberal Democratic
- Education: University of Tokyo

Shōji Maitachi is a Japanese politician who is a member of the House of Councillors of Japan.

== Biography ==
He graduated from the University of Tokyo and worked for the Home Ministry.
