= Tottori 2nd district =

Japan House of Representatives constituency

- Parliamentary constituency for the Japanese House of Representatives
- Numbered map of Tottori Prefecture single-member districts
- Prefecture: Tottori
- Proportional District: Chugoku
- Electorate: 230,593

Current constituency
- Created: 1994
- Seats: One
- Party: Liberal Democratic
- Representatives: Ryosei Akazawa
- Municipalities: Sakaiminato, Yonago District, Hino District, Saihaku District, and Tōhaku District (Towns of Hokuei, Kotoura, and Yurihama).

Tottori 2nd district (鳥取県第2区, Tottori-ken dai-niku or simply 鳥取2区, Tottori-niku ) is a single-member constituency of the House of Representatives in the national Diet of Japan located in Tottori Prefecture.

== List of representatives ==
Election	Representative	Party	Notes
1996	Hideyuki Aizawa	Liberal Democratic	
2000	Hideyuki Aizawa	Liberal Democratic	
2003	Yoshihiro Kawakami	Independent	
2003	Yoshihiro Kawakami	Liberal Democratic	
2003	Yoshihiro Kawakami	Independent	
2005	Ryosei Akazawa	Liberal Democratic	
2009	Ryosei Akazawa	Liberal Democratic	
2012	Ryosei Akazawa	Liberal Democratic	
2014	Ryosei Akazawa	Liberal Democratic	
2017	Ryosei Akazawa	Liberal Democratic	
2021	Ryosei Akazawa	Liberal Democratic	
2024	Ryosei Akazawa	Liberal Democratic	
2026	Ryosei Akazawa	Liberal Democratic	

== Election results ==
2026
Party	Candidate	Votes	%	±%
Liberal Democratic (endorsed by Ishin)	Ryosei Akazawa (incumbent)	67,736	62.3	▲0.48
Centrist Reform	Shunji Yuhara	36,132	33.2	▲0.10
JCP	Hideyuki Fukuzumi	4,862	4.5	▼0.58
Majority		31,604	29.1	▲0.41
Registered electors		224,916		
Turnout		108,730	49.29	▼9.72
LDP hold				

2024
Party	Candidate	Votes	%	±%
Liberal Democratic (endorsed by Komeito)	Ryosei Akazawa (incumbent)	81,526	61.82	▲7.84
CDP	Shunji Yuhara (endorsed by SDP)	43,696	33.13	▼12.89
JCP	Hideyuki Fukuzumi	6,655	5.05	New
Majority		37,830	28.69	▲20.73
Registered electors		227,871		
Turnout		131,877	59.01	▼1.19
LDP hold				

2021
Party	Candidate	Votes	%	±%
Liberal Democratic (endorsed by Komeito)	Ryosei Akazawa (incumbent)	75,005	53.98	
CDP	Shunji Yuhara (won PR seat)	63,947	46.02	New
Majority		11,058	7.96	
Registered electors		234,420		
Turnout			60.20	▲2.36
LDP hold				

2017
Party	Candidate	Votes	%	±%
Liberal Democratic (endorsed by Komeito)	Ryosei Akazawa (incumbent)	72,827	53.39	
Kibō no Tō (endorsed by DP)	Shunji Yuhara	53,312	39.08	New
Communist	Hideyuki Fukuzumi	10,271	7.53	
Majority		19,515	14.31	
Registered electors		240,310		
Turnout			57.84	
LDP hold				

2014
Party	Candidate	Votes	%	±%
Liberal Democratic	Ryosei Akazawa (incumbent)	76,579	56.25	
Democratic	Shunji Yuhara	49,297	36.21	
Communist	Hideyuki Fukuzumi	10,270	7.54	
Majority		27,282	20.04	
Turnout				
LDP hold				

2012
Party	Candidate	Votes	%	±%
Liberal Democratic	Ryosei Akazawa (incumbent)	87,395	60.81	
Democratic	Shunji Yuhara (PR seat incumbent)	45,728	31.82	
Communist	Hideyuki Fukuzumi	10,584	7.36	N/A
Majority		41,667	28.99	
Turnout				
LDP hold				

2009
Party	Candidate	Votes	%	±%
Liberal Democratic	Ryosei Akazawa (incumbent)	84,659	49.57	
Democratic	Shunji Yuhara (won PR seat)	84,033	49.21	
Happiness Realization	Hideo Kangai	2,082	1.22	New
Majority		626	0.36	
Turnout				
LDP hold				

2005
Party	Candidate	Votes	%	±%
Liberal Democratic	Ryosei Akazawa	64,132	37.44	
Independent	Yoshihiro Kawakami (incumbent)	58,909	34.39	
Democratic	Osamu Yamauchi (PR seat incumbent)	41,533	24.25	
Communist	Setsuo Sumi	6,711	3.92	
Majority		5,223	3.05	
Turnout				
LDP gain from Independent				

2003
Party	Candidate	Votes	%	±%
Independent	Yoshihiro Kawakami	52,466	33.08	New
Democratic	Osamu Yamauchi (PR seat incumbent) (won PR seat)	50,989	32.15	
Liberal Democratic	Hideyuki Aizawa (incumbent)	45,900	28.94	
Communist	Teruko Ohtani	9,266	5.84	
Majority		1,477	0.93	
Turnout				
Independent gain from LDP				

2000
Party	Candidate	Votes	%	±%
Liberal Democratic	Hideyuki Aizawa (incumbent)	80,843	50.23	
Democratic	Osamu Yamauchi (won PR seat)	67,939	42.22	New
Communist	Iwao Suizu	12,153	7.55	
Majority		12,904	8.01	
Turnout				
LDP hold				

1996
Party	Candidate	Votes	%	±%
Liberal Democratic	Hideyuki Aizawa	69,256	46.44	New
New Frontier	Osamu Yamauchi	64,199	43.05	New
Communist	Tatsuya Nagao	15,665	10.50	New
Majority		5,057	3.39	
Turnout				
LDP win (new seat)				
