= Tottori-Shimane at-large district =

Japan House of Councillors constituency

The Tottori-Shimane at-large district (鳥取県・島根県選挙区, Tottori-Shimane senkyoku) is a constituency of the House of Councillors in the Diet of Japan (national legislature). It was formed pursuant to a 2015 revision of the Public Officers Election Law from a merger of the Tottori and Shimane at-large districts, the two smallest districts in the country, to address the imbalance in representation between rural and urban voters. The district has 1,068,348 registered voters (as of September 2016) and was contested for the first time at the House of Councillors election that was held on 10 July 2016.

Kazuhiko Aoki of the Liberal Democratic Party was the first councillor elected by the district at the 2016 election. As only half of the house's members are elected at each election, the councillors elected by the Shimane and Tottori districts at the 2013 election will continue to represent their respective prefectures until the next election, due to be held by July 2019. At that time, a second councillor will be elected by the merged district.

== Elected Councillors ==
Class of 1947	Election Year	Class of 1950
Seat Created	2016	Kazuhiko Aoki (LDP)
Shōji Maitachi (LDP)	2019	Kazuhiko Aoki (LDP)
Shōji Maitachi (LDP)	2022	Kazuhiko Aoki (LDP)

== Election results ==
At the July 2016 House of Councillors election, the terms of two Councillors who were elected at the 2010 election were due to expire; Kazuhiko Aoki of the Liberal Democratic Party (LDP) represented Shimane Prefecture, while Tottori Prefecture was represented by Kazuyuki Hamada, who was elected in 2010 as an LDP candidate but defected to an opposing party a year later. As the only incumbent LDP member in the new district, Aoki received the party's nomination to contest the newly merged district and also received an endorsement from Komeito, the LDP's junior coalition partner. Hamada, aware of the difficulty he faced in defeating Aoki, resigned from the Party for Japanese Kokoro in April 2016 and joined Initiatives from Osaka the same month, receiving their nomination to contest the election from the national proportional representation block.

In an attempt to defeat the ruling LDP-Komeito coalition, the four main opposition parties (Democratic Party, Japanese Communist Party, Social Democratic Party and People's Life Party) agreed to field a single candidate in each single-seat district, who would run as a nominally independent candidate. In the Tottori-Shimane district, the opposition block endorsed Tottori native Hirohiko Fukushima, a former director-general of the Consumer Affairs Agency and former mayor of Abiko, Chiba. The third candidate in the election was Shimane native Bunta Kokuryō of the Happiness Realization Party. In the election, Aoki received 62.7% of the vote to comfortably defeat Fukushima, who received 34.7%.

2016
Party	Candidate	Votes	%	±%
LDP	Kazuhiko Aoki (Incumbent) (Endorsed by Komeito)	387,787	62.7	N/A
Independent	Hirohiko Fukushima (Endorsed by Democratic, Communist, Social Democratic and People's Life parties)	214,917	34.7	N/A
Happiness Realization	Bunta Kokuryō	15,791	2.6	N/A

2019
Party	Candidate	Votes	%	±%
LDP	Shōji Maitachi	328,394	62.3	N/A
Independent	Yoshiko Nakabayashi	167,329	31.7	N/A
Anti-NHK	Nobuaki Kurose	31,770	6.0	N/A

2022
Party	Candidate	Votes	%	±%
LDP	Kazuhiko Aoki (Incumbent)	326,750	62.5	−0.2
CDP	Taijiro Murakami	118,063	22.6	N/A
JCP	Hideyuki Fukuzumi	37,723	7.2	N/A
Independent	Yoshitaka Maeda	26,718	5.1	N/A
Anti-NHK	Nobuaki Kurose	13,517	2.6	N/A
