= Tottori at-large district =

Former Japan House of Councillors constituency

The Tottori at-large district (Japanese: 鳥取県選挙区, Hepburn: Tottori-ken Senkyoku) was a constituency that represents Tottori Prefecture in the House of Councillors in the Diet of Japan. Councillors are elected to the house by single non-transferable vote (SNTV) for six-year terms. Since the establishment of the current House of Councillors electoral system in 1947, the district has elected two Councillors, one each at elections held every three years. With its 474,963 registered voters (as of September 2015) it is the smallest electoral district for the house. Accordingly, a 2015 revision of the Public Officers Election Law will see the district merged with the Shimane At-large district to create the Tottori-Shimane At-large district; this change took effect at the 2016 election, at which one Councillor was elected.

The Councillors currently representing Tottori are:

- Kazuyuki Hamada (Party for Japanese Kokoro; term ends in 2016)
- Shoji Maitachi (Liberal Democratic Party; term ends in 2019)

== Elected Councillors ==
| Class of 1947 | Election year | Class of 1950 |
| (1947: 6-year term) | Election year | (1947: 3-year term) |
|---|---|---|
| Teizo Kadota (Tottori Farmers' Federation) | 1947 | Nobuyoshi Tanaka (Democratic) |
| Teizo Kadota (Tottori Farmers' Federation) | 1950 | Yoshio Nakata (Social Democratic) (Note: Resigned 4 March 1956 in order to contest by-election) |
| Hideyuki Miyoshi (Ind.) (Note: Died in office 14 February 1956) | 1953 | Yoshio Nakata (Social Democratic) |
| Yoshio Nakata (Social Democratic) | 1956 by-election | |
| Yoshio Nakata (Social Democratic) | 1956 | Zenichi Nakahara (LDP) |
| Yoshio Nakata (Social Democratic) | 1959 | Zenichi Nakahara (LDP) |
| Yoshio Nakata (Social Democratic) | 1962 | Zenichi Nakahara (LDP) |
| Masao Miyazaki (LDP) | 1965 | Zenichi Nakahara (LDP) |
| Masao Miyazaki (LDP) | 1968 | Kaku Ashika (Social Democratic) |
| Masao Miyazaki (LDP) | 1971 | Kaku Ashika (Social Democratic) |
| Masao Miyazaki (LDP) | 1974 | Jiro Ishiba (LDP) (Note: Died in office 16 September 1981) |
| Koichi Hirota (Social Democratic) | 1977 | Jiro Ishiba (LDP) |
| Koichi Hirota (Social Democratic) | 1980 | Jiro Ishiba (LDP) |
| Koichi Hirota (Social Democratic) | 1981 by-election | Kuniji Kobayashi (LDP) |
| Shoji Nishimua (LDP) | 1983 | Kuniji Kobayashi (LDP) |
| Shoji Nishimua (LDP) | 1986 | Shigenobu Sakano (LDP) (Note: Died in office 17 April 2002) |
| Tatsuo Yoshida (Ind.) | 1989 | Shigenobu Sakano (LDP) |
| Tatsuo Yoshida (Ind.) | 1992 | Shigenobu Sakano (LDP) |
| Takayoshi Tsuneda (Ind.) | 1995 | Shigenobu Sakano (LDP) |
| Takayoshi Tsuneda (Ind.) | 1998 | Shigenobu Sakano (LDP) |
| Takayoshi Tsuneda (Ind.) | 2001 | Shigenobu Sakano (LDP) |
| Takayoshi Tsuneda (Ind.) | 2002 by-election | Kotaro Tamura (Ind.) |
| Takayoshi Tsuneda (Ind.) | 2004 | Kotaro Tamura (LDP) |
| Yoshihiro Kawakami (DPJ) | 2007 | Kotaro Tamura (LDP) |
| Yoshihiro Kawakami (DPJ) | 2010 | Kazuyuki Hamada (LDP) (Note: Elected as LDP candidate but has switched parties several times since) |
| Shoji Maitachi (LDP) | 2013 | Kazuyuki Hamada (LDP) |
| Shoji Maitachi (LDP) | 2016 | Seat abolished |
| Seat abolished | 2019 | Seat abolished |

== Election results ==
2013
| Party | Candidate | Votes | % | ±% |
|---|---|---|---|---|
| LDP | Shoji Maitachi (endorsed by Komeito) | 160,783 | 58.2 | |
| Democratic | Noriyuki Kawakami | 82,717 | 30.0 | |
| JCP | Naoyuki Iwanaga | 19,600 | 7.1 | |
| Happiness Realization | Yuriko Yoshioka | 6,782 | 2.5 | |
| Independent | Hiroshi Inoue | 6,158 | 2.2 | |
| Turnout | | | 58.88 | |

2010
| Party | Candidate | Votes | % | ±% |
|---|---|---|---|---|
| LDP | Kazuyuki Hamada | 158,445 | 50.8 | |
| Democratic | Mari Sakano (Endorsed by People's New Party) | 132,720 | 42.6 | |
| JCP | Naoyuki Iwanaga | 20,613 | 6.6 | |
| Turnout | | | 65.77 | |
