= Shimane at-large district =

Former Japan House of Councillors constituency

The Shimane at-large district (Japanese: 島根県選挙区, Hepburn: Shimane-ken Senkyoku) was a constituency that represents Shimane Prefecture in the House of Councillors in the Diet of Japan. Councillors are elected to the house by single non-transferable vote (SNTV) for six-year terms. Since the establishment of the current House of Councillors electoral system in 1947, the district has elected two Councillors, one each at elections held every three years. With its 576,297 registered voters (as of September 2015) it is the second-smallest electoral district for the house. Accordingly, a 2015 revision of the Public Officers Election Law will see the district merged with the Tottori At-large district to create the Tottori-Shimane At-large district; this change will begin to take effect at the 2016 election, at which one Councillor will be elected.

The Councillor currently representing Shimane is:

- Saburo Shimada (LDP; term ends in 2019)

== Elected Councillors ==
Class of 1947	Election year	Class of 1950
(1947: 6-year term)	Election year	(1947: 3-year term)
Genichiro Date (Ind.)	1947	Noboru Utsunomiya (Ind.)
Genichiro Date (Ind.)	1950	Yoshio Sakurauchi (People's Democratic)
Shigeo Odachi (Liberal) (Note: Died in office 25 September 1955)	1953	Yoshio Sakurauchi (People's Democratic)
Hiroshi Sano (Ind.)	1955 by-election	Yoshio Sakurauchi (People's Democratic)
Hiroshi Sano (Ind.)	1956	Akira Kodaki (LDP) (Note: Died in office 28 May 1958)
Hiroshi Sano (Ind.)	1958 by-election	Toshinaga Yamamoto (LDP)
Hiroshi Sano (LDP)	1959	Toshinaga Yamamoto (LDP)
Hiroshi Sano (LDP)	1962	Toshinaga Yamamoto (Ind.)
Hideo Nakamura (Social Democratic)	1965	Toshinaga Yamamoto (Ind.)
Hideo Nakamura (Social Democratic)	1968	Toshinaga Yamamoto (LDP)
Hideo Nakamura (Social Democratic)	1971	Toshinaga Yamamoto (LDP)
Hideo Nakamura (Social Democratic)	1974	Hisaoki Kamei (LDP)
Zenju Nariai (LDP)	1977	Hisaoki Kamei (LDP)
Zenju Nariai (LDP)	1980	Hisaoki Kamei (LDP)
Zenju Nariai (LDP)	1983	Hisaoki Kamei (LDP)
Zenju Nariai (LDP)	1986	Mikio Aoki (LDP)
Hisato Iwamoto (Ind.)	1989	Mikio Aoki (LDP)
Hisato Iwamoto (Ind.)	1992	Mikio Aoki (LDP)
Shuntaro Kageyama (LDP)	1995	Mikio Aoki (LDP)
Shuntaro Kageyama (LDP)	1998	Mikio Aoki (LDP)
Shuntaro Kageyama (LDP)	2001	Mikio Aoki (LDP)
Shuntaro Kageyama (LDP)	2004	Mikio Aoki (LDP)
Akiko Kamei (People's New)	2007	Mikio Aoki (LDP)
Akiko Kamei (People's New)	2010	Kazuhiko Aoki (LDP)
Saburo Shimada (LDP)	2013	Kazuhiko Aoki (LDP)
Saburo Shimada (LDP)	2016	Seat abolished
Seat abolished	2019	Seat abolished

== Election results ==
2013
Party	Candidate	Votes	%	±%
LDP	Saburo Shimada (endorsed by Komeito)	202,181	57.8	
Green Wind	Akiko Kamei	115,043	32.9	
JCP	Shinichi Mukose	26,255	7.5	
Happiness Realization	Setsuko Ikeda	6,054	1.7	
Turnout			60.89	

2010
Party	Candidate	Votes	%	±%
LDP	Kazuhiko Aoki	222,448	52.9	
Democratic	Hirotaka Iwata	151,351	36.0	
Your	Tomoo Sakurauchi	28,183	6.7	
JCP	Ikuhisa Ishitobi	18,512	4.4	
Turnout			71.70	
