= 2007 Japanese House of Councillors election =

- July 29, 2007

121 of the 242 seats in the House of Councillors 122 seats needed for a majority
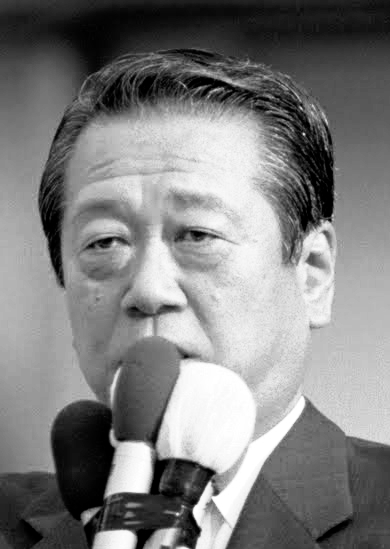

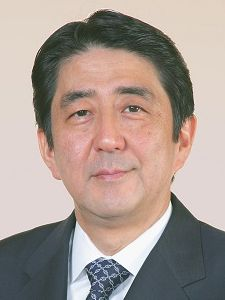

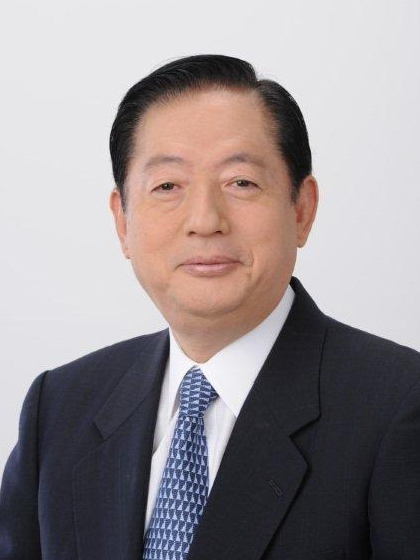

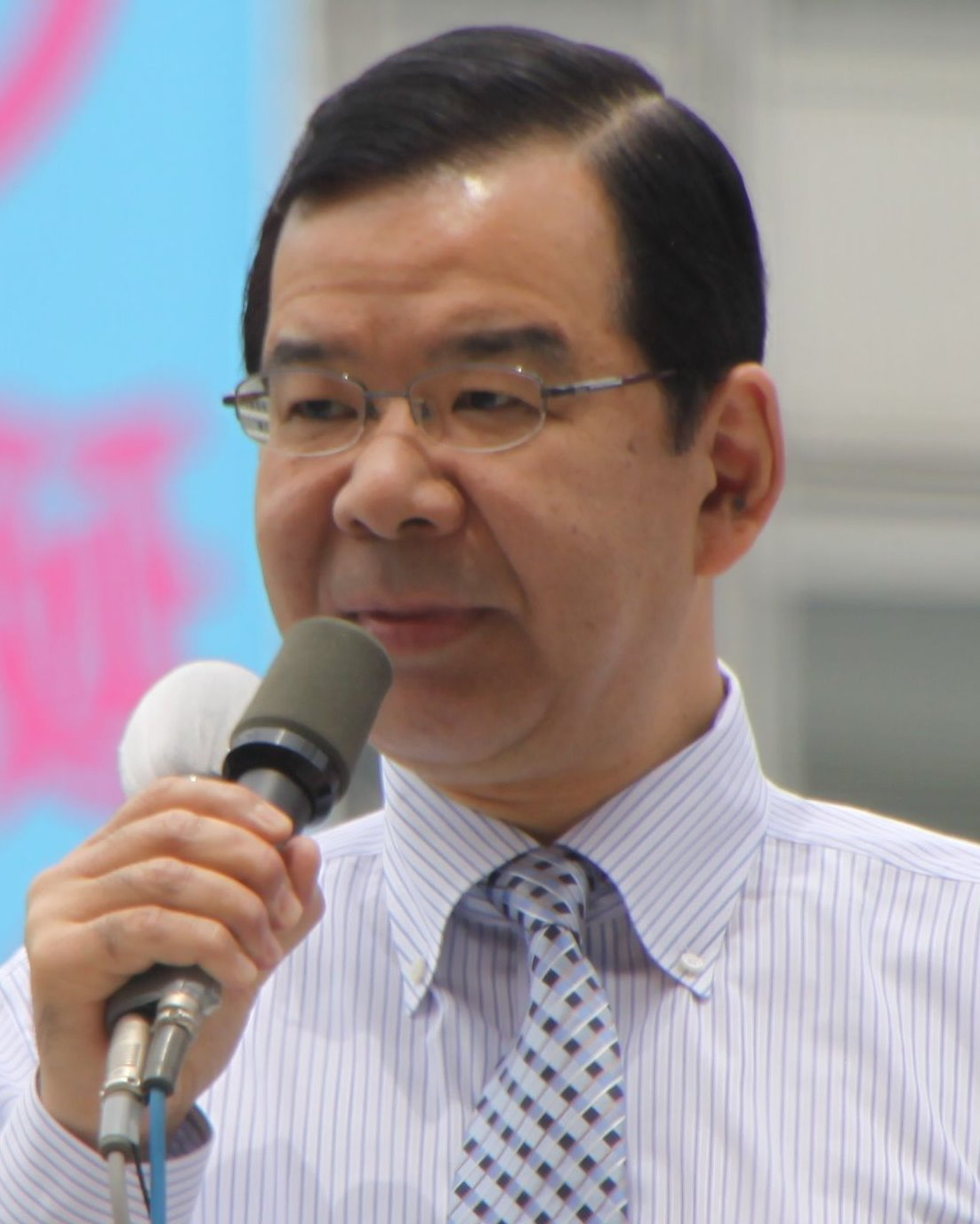

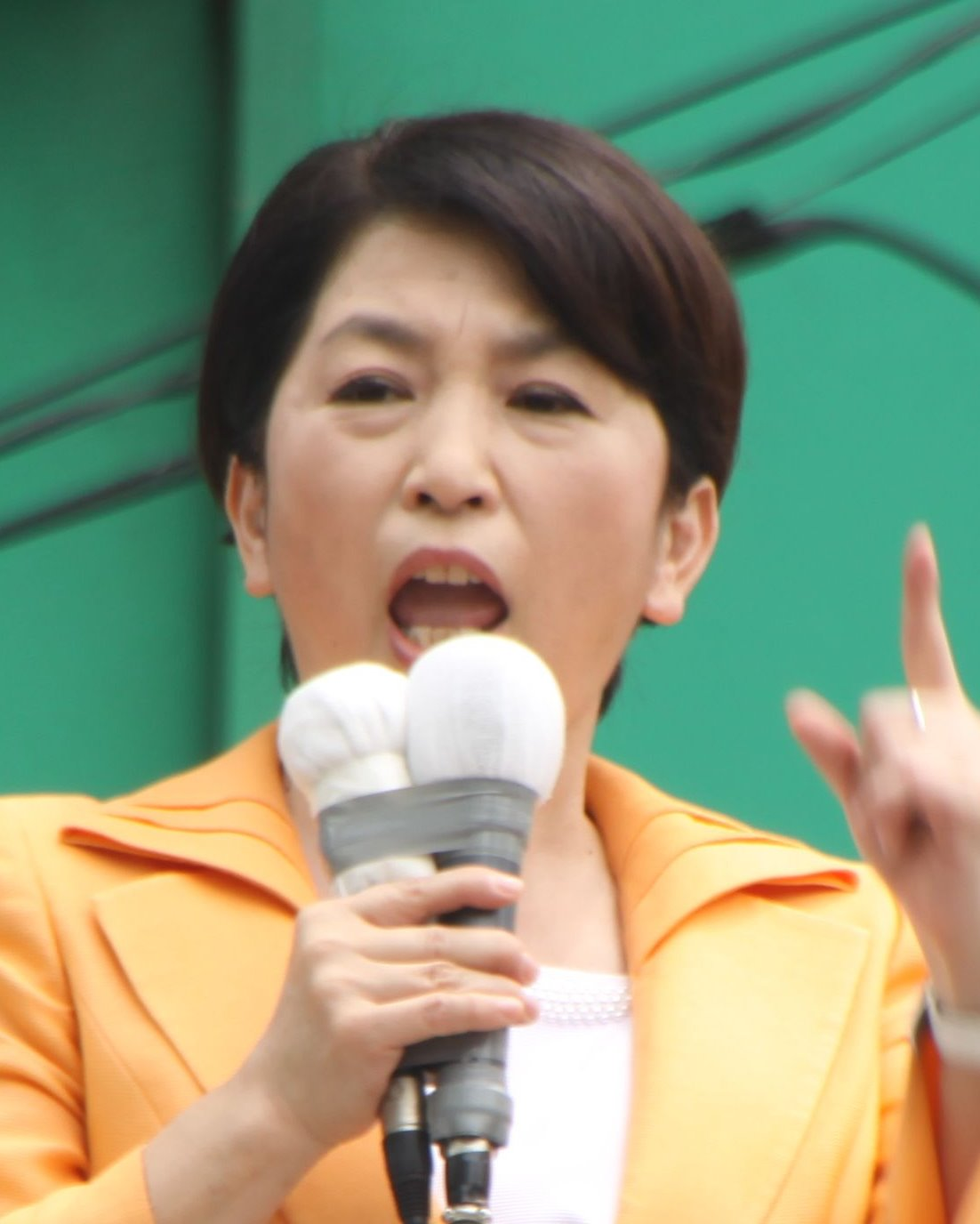

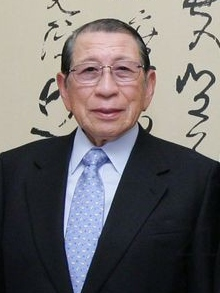

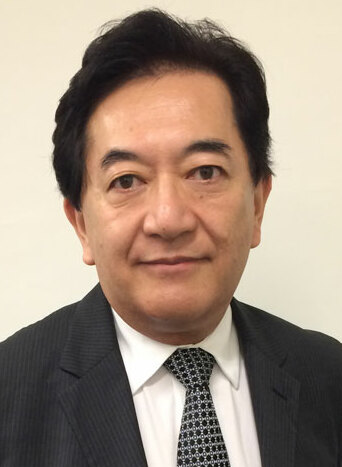
	First party	Second party	Third party
Leader	Ichirō Ozawa	Shinzō Abe	Akihiro Ota
Party	Democratic	LDP	Komeito
Last election	82 seats	115 seats	24 seats
Seats won	60	37	9
Seats after	109	83	20
Seat change	▲27	▼32	▼4
Constituency vote	24,006,818	18,606,193	3,534,672
% and swing	40.45% (▲1.36pp)	31.35% (▼3.74pp)	5.96% (▼2.11pp)
National vote	23,256,247	16,544,761	7,765,329
% and swing	39.48% (▲1.69pp)	28.08% (▼1.95pp)	13.18% (▼2.23pp)
	Fourth party	Fifth party	Sixth party
Leader	Kazuo Shii	Mizuho Fukushima	Tamisuke Watanuki
Party	JCP	Social Democratic	People's New
Last election	9 seats	5 seats	Did not exist
Seats won	3	2	2
Seats after	7	5	4
Seat change	▼2	Steady	New
Constituency vote	5,164,572	1,352,018	1,111,005
% and swing	8.70% (▼1.14pp)	2.28% (▲0.53pp)	1.87% (New)
National vote	4,407,933	2,634,714	1,269,209
% and swing	7.48% (▼0.32pp)	4.47% (▼0.88pp)	2.15% (New)
	Seventh party
Leader	Yasuo Tanaka
Party	NP-Nippon
Last election	Did not exist
Seats won	1
Seats after	1
Seat change	New
Constituency vote	—
National vote	1,770,707
% and swing	3.01% (New)
- Constituency and proportional representation (bottom right) election result
President of the House of Councillors before election
Chikage Oogi
LDP
Elected President of the House of Councillors
Satsuki Eda
Democratic

House of Councillors elections were held in Japan on July 29, 2007. The date was originally to be July 22, but the ruling Liberal Democratic Party (LDP) decided in mid-June to extend the session of the House for a week to finish up legislative business; this step was criticised due to the short-term delay.

The House of Councillors consists of 242 members who serve six-year terms. Approximately half the members are elected every three years. The previous elections took place in 2004 when Junichiro Koizumi, Abe's predecessor, was in office.

The house ended its 166th session on July 5, 2007, marking the unofficial beginning of campaign. The official campaign began on July 12.

The ruling coalition of Liberal Democratic Party and New Komeito lost control, creating the first divided Diet (opposition control of the House of Councillors) since 1999. The LDP became the second party for the first time, while the DPJ became first party for the first time.

== Background ==
The DPJ had 79 seats (82 including shin-ryokufukai) after the 2004 Upper House elections, winning 50 out of the 121 up for election, gaining 12, compared to the LDP's 49. As of February 17, 2007, the DPJ held 82 seats to the LDP's 111.

Ichirō Ozawa, the leader of the DPJ, addressed a workers' May Day rally in Yoyogi Park on April 28, 2007, setting out the party's agenda for the election. He pledged that the key policy areas would be an end to 'self-righteous' government, pension and medical reforms, and that the DPJ would 'stand in the shoes of workers, residents, and taxpayers'.

Reports throughout 2007 showed Shinzō Abe's approval ratings falling, and public support for the DPJ's position on the recent pension scandal. Several other scandals right up until the start of official campaigning did not improve the outlook for the LDP.

=== Political issues ===
- Loss of records for millions of payments in the national pension system.
- Series of gaffes by cabinet members, the Minister of Health, Labour and Welfare Hakuo Yanagisawa and the Minister of Defense Fumio Kyuma, who later resigned.
- Financial scandals of two Ministers of Agriculture, Toshikatsu Matsuoka, who later committed suicide, and his successor Norihiko Akagi, who resigned after the election.

== Results ==
According to results by NHK, the LDP lost its majority in the Upper House. Meanwhile, the DPJ managed to gain the largest margin since its formation in 1996. LDP's coalition partner New Komeito lost 3 of its twelve seats. Although the opposition made it clear that they intended to officially ask for Abe's resignation, he vowed to "continue pitching" for leadership.

Most of the candidates who received international coverage were defeated in the elections - including Alberto Fujimori, Kaori Tahara, Kanako Otsuji, Yoshiro Nakamatsu, and Yuko Tojo. Notable candidates who were elected included iconoclastic former Nagano governor Yasuo Tanaka, who achieved one seat for his own New Party Nippon, and ethnic Finn Marutei Tsurunen, who was re-elected with the sixth-highest vote count on the DPJ party list.

The election resulted in the removal of numerous LDP councillors representing doctors, dentists, the construction industry and other special interest groups. Historically, such individuals had been elected solely by the votes of members of their own industries.

Party	National			Constituency			Seats			
Party	Votes	%	Seats	Votes	%	Seats	Not up	Won	Total after	+/–
Democratic Party of Japan	23,256,247	39.48	20	24,006,818	40.45	40	49	60	109	+27
Liberal Democratic Party	16,544,761	28.08	14	18,606,193	31.35	23	46	37	83	–32
New Komeito Party	7,765,329	13.18	7	3,534,672	5.96	2	11	9	20	–4
Japanese Communist Party	4,407,933	7.48	3	5,164,572	8.70	0	4	3	7	–2
Social Democratic Party	2,634,714	4.47	2	1,352,018	2.28	0	3	2	5	0
New Party Nippon	1,770,707	3.01	1				0	1	1	New
People's New Party	1,269,209	2.15	1	1,111,005	1.87	1	2	2	4	New
Women's Party	673,560	1.14	0				0	0	0	0
Article 9 Net	273,745	0.46	0	185,773	0.31	0	0	0	0	New
Ishin Seito Shimpu	170,510	0.29	0	129,222	0.22	0	0	0	0	0
Kyōsei Shintō	146,985	0.25	0	128,622	0.22	0	0	0	0	New
Other parties				33,565	0.06	0	1	0	1	–
Independents				5,095,168	8.59	7	6	7	12	+5
Total	58,913,700	100.00	48	59,347,628	100.00	73	121	121	242	0
Valid votes	58,914,134	96.89		59,347,629	97.59					
Invalid/blank votes	1,889,101	3.11		1,464,700	2.41					
Total votes	60,803,235	100.00		60,812,329	100.00					
Registered voters/turnout	103,710,035	58.63		103,710,035	58.64					
Source: MIC, National Diet

=== Detailed results ===
Elected

Prefectural districts
Constituency	Previous members		Elected members		Votes	%	Status
Hokkaido & Tohoku
Hokkaido	Katsuya Ogawa	DPJ	Katsuya Ogawa	DPJ	1,018,597	36.0	DPJ hold
Hokkaido	Chūichi Date	LDP	Chūichi Date	LDP	757,463	26.8	LDP hold
Aomori	Tsutomu Yamazaki	LDP	Kōji Hirayama	DPJ	305,642	49.0	DPJ gain from LDP
Iwate	Tatsuo Hirano	DPJ	Tatsuo Hirano	DPJ	437,814	62.6	DPJ hold
Miyagi	Tomiko Okazaki	DPJ	Tomiko Okazaki	DPJ	549,183	52.7	DPJ hold
Miyagi	Jiro Aichi	LDP	Jiro Aichi	LDP	359,099	34.5	LDP hold
Akita	Katsutoshi Kaneda	LDP	Daigo Matsuura	Ind.	319,631	50.4	Ind. gain from LDP
Yamagata	Masatoshi Abe	LDP	Yasue Funayama	DPJ	371,071	57.3	DPJ gain from LDP
Fukushima	Hiroko Wada	DPJ	Emi Kaneko	DPJ	503,423	49.9	DPJ hold
Fukushima	Toyoaki Ota	LDP	Masako Mori	LDP	372,857	37.0	LDP hold
Kanto
Ibaraki	Moto Kobayashi	DPJ	Yukihisa Fujita	DPJ	540,174	43.4	DPJ hold
Ibaraki	Yasu Kano	LDP	Tamon Hasegawa	LDP	427,297	34.3	LDP hold
Tochigi	Hiroyuki Tani	DPJ	Hiroyuki Tani	DPJ	484,900	53.9	DPJ hold
Tochigi	Masayuki Kunii	LDP	Seat abolished				LDP loss
Gunma	Ichita Yamamoto	LDP	Ichita Yamamoto	LDP	530,114	62.0	LDP hold
Gunma	Giichi Tsunoda	DPJ	Seat abolished				DPJ loss
Saitama	Hiroshi Takano	Komei	Kuniko Koda	DPJ	745,517	23.5	DPJ gain from Komei
Saitama	Taizo Sato	LDP	Toshiharu Furukawa	LDP	684,270	21.6	LDP hold
Saitama	Ryuji Yamane	DPJ	Ryuji Yamane	DPJ	665,063	21.0	DPJ hold
Chiba	Akira Imaizumi	DPJ	Hiroyuki Nagahama	DPJ	666,241	25.2	DPJ hold
Chiba	Hiroyuki Kurata	LDP	Junichi Ishii	LDP	541,701	20.5	LDP hold
Chiba	New seat		Ken Kagaya	DPJ	477,402	18.1	DPJ win
Tokyo	Yasuo Ogata	JCP	Masako Ōkawara	DPJ	1,087,743	18.4	DPJ gain from JCP
Tokyo	Natsuo Yamaguchi	Komei	Natsuo Yamaguchi	Komei	794,936	13.5	Komei hold
Tokyo	Kan Suzuki	DPJ	Kan Suzuki	DPJ	780,662	13.2	DPJ hold
Tokyo	Sanzo Hosaka	LDP	Tamayo Marukawa	LDP	691,367	11.7	LDP hold
Tokyo	New seat		Ryūhei Kawada	Ind.	683,629	11.6	Ind. win
Kanagawa	Akira Matsu	Komei	Hiroe Makiyama	DPJ	1,010,866	25.4	DPJ gain from Komei
Kanagawa	Yutaka Kobayashi	LDP	Yutaka Kobayashi	LDP	895,752	22.5	LDP hold
Kanagawa	Yoriko Kawaguchi	LDP	Masashi Mito	DPJ	781,533	19.7	DPJ gain from LDP
Chubu
Niigata	Takahiro Kuroiwa	DPJ	Ichiro Tsukada	LDP	403,497	32.1	LDP gain from DPJ
Niigata	Yuko Mori	DPJ	Yuko Mori	DPJ	355,901	28.3	DPJ hold
Toyama	Kōtarō Nogami	LDP	Takashi Morita	Ind.	291,714	50.1	Ind. gain from LDP
Ishikawa	Tetsuo Kutsukake	LDP	Yasuo Ichikawa	DPJ	272,366	46.9	DPJ gain from LDP
Fukui	Ryuji Matsumura	LDP	Ryuji Matsumura	LDP	193,617	47.5	LDP hold
Yamanashi	Mahito Nakajima	LDP	Harunobu Yonenaga	DPJ	242,586	55.3	DPJ gain from LDP
Nagano	Yuichiro Hata	DPJ	Yuichiro Hata	DPJ	538,690	47.9	DPJ hold
Nagano	Hiromi Yoshida	LDP	Hiromi Yoshida	LDP	301,635	26.8	LDP hold
Gifu	Tsuyako Ōno	LDP	Takao Fujii	Ind.	466,008	46.1	Ind. gain from LDP
Gifu	Kenji Hirata	DPJ	Kenji Hirata	DPJ	445,489	44.1	DPJ hold
Shizuoka	Kazuya Shimba	DPJ	Kazuya Shimba	DPJ	823,184	47.1	DPJ hold
Shizuoka	Yutaka Takeyama	LDP	Takao Makino	LDP	549,375	31.4	LDP hold
Aichi	Kohei Otsuka	DPJ	Kohei Otsuka	DPJ	880,856	26.4	DPJ hold
Aichi	Seiji Suzuki	LDP	Seiji Suzuki	LDP	734,153	22.0	LDP hold
Aichi	Tamotsu Yamamoto	Komei	Kuniko Tanioka	DPJ	720,777	21.6	DPJ gain from Komei
Mie	Chiaki Takahashi	DPJ	Chiaki Takahashi	DPJ	527,935	59.4	DPJ hold
Kansai
Shiga	Hidetoshi Yamashita	LDP	Hisashi Tokunaga	DPJ	325,365	50.2	DPJ gain from LDP
Kyoto	Koji Matsui	DPJ	Koji Matsui	DPJ	501,979	43.6	DPJ hold
Kyoto	Yoshihiro Nishida	LDP	Shoji Nishida	LDP	362,274	31.4	LDP hold
Osaka	Takashi Yamamoto	DPJ	Satoshi Umemura	DPJ	1,281,502	33.2	DPJ hold
Osaka	Kazuyoshi Shirahama	Komei	Kazuyoshi Shirahama	Komei	836,903	21.7	Komei hold
Osaka	Shuzen Tanigawa	LDP	Shuzen Tanigawa	LDP	732,175	18.9	LDP hold
Hyogo	Yasuhiro Tsuji	DPJ	Yasuhiro Tsuji	DPJ	1,086,682	44.1	DPJ hold
Hyogo	Yoshitada Konoike	LDP	Yoshitada Konoike	LDP	860,568	34.9	LDP hold
Nara	Vacant	LDP	Tetsuji Nakamura	DPJ	359,584	52.5	DPJ gain from LDP
Wakayama	Hiroshige Sekō	LDP	Hiroshige Sekō	LDP	256,577	52.3	LDP hold
Chugoku
Tottori	Takayoshi Tsuneda	LDP	Yoshihiro Kawakami	DPJ	168,380	51.5	DPJ gain from LDP
Shimane	Shuntaro Kageyama	LDP	Akiko Kamei	PNP	217,707	50.9	PNP gain from LDP
Okayama	Toranosuke Katayama	LDP	Yumiko Himei	DPJ	451,185	49.4	DPJ gain from LDP
Hiroshima	Vacant	LDP	Koji Sato	DPJ	570,823	43.9	DPJ gain from LDP
Hiroshima	Kensei Mizote	LDP	Kensei Mizote	LDP	389,881	30.0	LDP hold
Yamaguchi	Yoshimasa Hayashi	LDP	Yoshimasa Hayashi	LDP	419,947	56.7	LDP hold
Shikoku
Tokushima	Shuji Kitaoka	LDP	Tomoji Nakatani	DPJ	206,457	54.0	DPJ gain from LDP
Kagawa	Kenji Manabe	LDP	Emiko Uematsu	DPJ	257,548	53.6	DPJ gain from LDP
Ehime	Katsutsugu Sekiya	LDP	Toshirō Tomochika	Ind.	378,813	51.3	Ind. gain from LDP
Kochi	Kohei Tamura	LDP	Norio Takeuchi	DPJ	166,220	44.7	DPJ gain from LDP
Kyushu & Okinawa
Fukuoka	Tsukasa Iwamoto	DPJ	Tsukasa Iwamoto	DPJ	1,003,170	46.8	DPJ hold
Fukuoka	Masaji Matsuyama	LDP	Masaji Matsuyama	LDP	791,152	36.9	LDP hold
Saga	Takao Jinnouchi	LDP	Minoru Kawasaki	DPJ	210,452	49.6	DPJ gain from LDP
Nagasaki	Tadashi Taura	LDP	Yukishige Okubo	DPJ	352,953	49.0	DPJ gain from LDP
Kumamoto	Issui Miura	LDP	Nobuo Matsuno	DPJ	440,742	48.4	DPJ gain from LDP
Oita	Hiroko Goto	PNP	Yōsuke Isozaki	LDP	199,523	32.6	LDP gain from PNP
Miyazaki	Toshifumi Kosehira	LDP	Itsuki Toyama	Ind.	196,685	37.6	Ind. gain from LDP
Kagoshima	Yoshito Kajiya	LDP	Yoshito Kajiya	LDP	402,541	47.6	LDP hold
Okinawa	Junshiro Nishime	LDP	Keiko Itokazu	Ind.	376,460	60.2	LDP hold

Proportional representation results
Party	Votes	Seats	Elected member	Pref. votes
DPJ	23,256,242 (39.5%)	20	Kumiko Aihara	507,792
DPJ	23,256,242 (39.5%)	20	Saori Yoshikawa	306,577
DPJ	23,256,242 (39.5%)	20	Ai Aoki	297,035
DPJ	23,256,242 (39.5%)	20	Hajime Ishii	292,272
DPJ	23,256,242 (39.5%)	20	Shuji Ikeguchi	255,451
DPJ	23,256,242 (39.5%)	20	Marutei Tsurunen	242,740
DPJ	23,256,242 (39.5%)	20	Mieko Kamimoto	224,994
DPJ	23,256,242 (39.5%)	20	Yoshiro Yokomine	211,829
DPJ	23,256,242 (39.5%)	20	Masashi Fujiwara	194,080
DPJ	23,256,242 (39.5%)	20	Takanori Kawai	171,084
DPJ	23,256,242 (39.5%)	20	Naoki Kazama	169,723
DPJ	23,256,242 (39.5%)	20	Toshiharu Todoroki	166,969
DPJ	23,256,242 (39.5%)	20	Kusuo Oshima	153,779
DPJ	23,256,242 (39.5%)	20	Takeo Nishioka	151,375
DPJ	23,256,242 (39.5%)	20	Azuma Konno	111,457
DPJ	23,256,242 (39.5%)	20	Yoshinobu Fujiwara	110,126
DPJ	23,256,242 (39.5%)	20	Koshin Fujitani	79,656
DPJ	23,256,242 (39.5%)	20	Kunihiko Muroi	72,545
DPJ	23,256,242 (39.5%)	20	Yasuhiro Oe	68,973
DPJ	23,256,242 (39.5%)	20	Takashi Yamamoto	67,611
LDP	16,544,728 (28.1%)	14	Yōichi Masuzoe	470,571
LDP	16,544,728 (28.1%)	14	Toshio Yamada	449,183
LDP	16,544,728 (28.1%)	14	Kyoko Nakayama	385,913
LDP	16,544,728 (28.1%)	14	Kazuya Maruyama	272,348
LDP	16,544,728 (28.1%)	14	Yoriko Kawaguchi	261,404
LDP	16,544,728 (28.1%)	14	Masahisa Sato	251,579
LDP	16,544,728 (28.1%)	14	Hidehisa Otsuji	230,299
LDP	16,544,728 (28.1%)	14	Midori Ishii	228,166
LDP	16,544,728 (28.1%)	14	Nobuaki Sato	227,098
LDP	16,544,728 (28.1%)	14	Hiroyuki Yoshiie	223,068
LDP	16,544,728 (28.1%)	14	Seiko Hashimoto	221,361
LDP	16,544,728 (28.1%)	14	Akiko Santō	203,323
LDP	16,544,728 (28.1%)	14	Seiichi Eto	202,315
LDP	16,544,728 (28.1%)	14	Haruko Arimura	201,301
Komei	7,765,328 (13.2%)	7	Kanae Yamamoto	1,027,543
Komei	7,765,328 (13.2%)	7	Kentaro Koba	706,996
Komei	7,765,328 (13.2%)	7	Hiroshi Yamamoto	619,837
Komei	7,765,328 (13.2%)	7	Kiyohiko Toyama	612,972
Komei	7,765,328 (13.2%)	7	Takao Watanabe	558,206
Komei	7,765,328 (13.2%)	7	Shuichi Kato	392,897
Komei	7,765,328 (13.2%)	7	Yuichiro Uozumi	231,500
JCP	4,407,932 (7.5%)	3	Satoshi Inoue	189,458
JCP	4,407,932 (7.5%)	3	Tomoko Kami	76,878
JCP	4,407,932 (7.5%)	3	Yoshiki Yamashita	55,911
SDP	2,634,713 (4.5%)	2	Seiji Mataichi	218,856
SDP	2,634,713 (4.5%)	2	Tokushin Yamauchi	145,659
NPN	1,770,707 (3.0%)	1	Yasuo Tanaka	458,221
PNP	1,269,209 (2.2%)	1	Shozaburo Jimi	117,590
