= 2001 Japanese House of Councillors election =

- 29 July 2001

121 of the 247 seats in the House of Councillors 124 seats needed for a majority
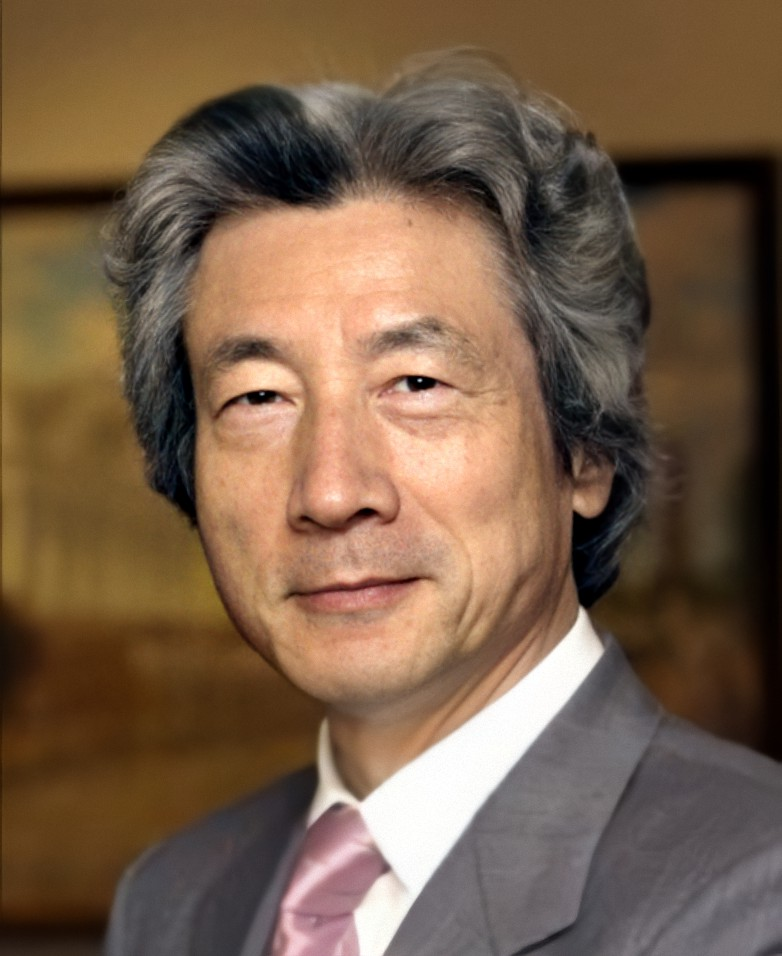

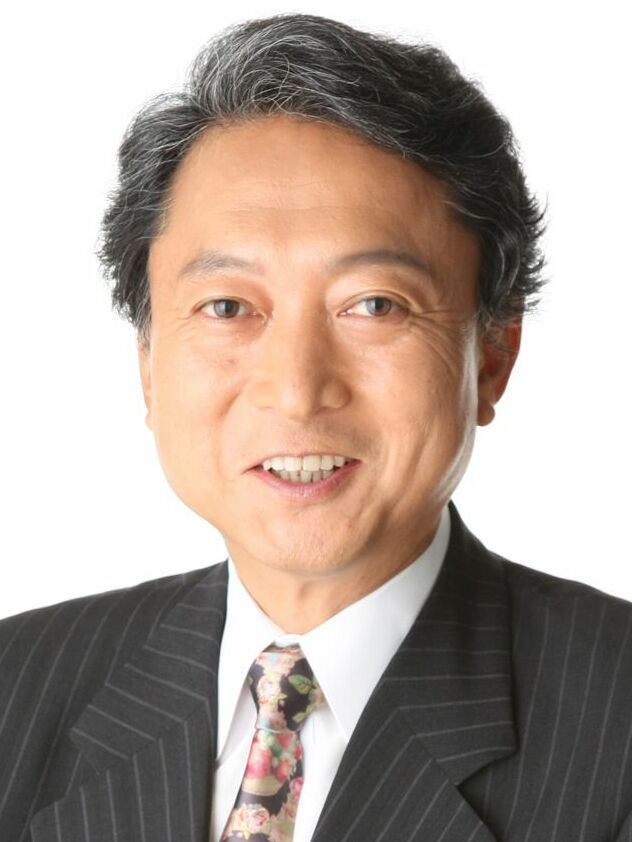

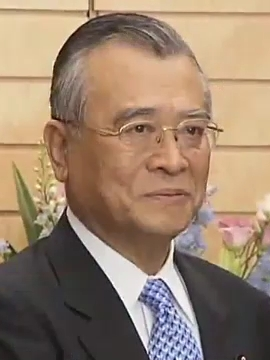

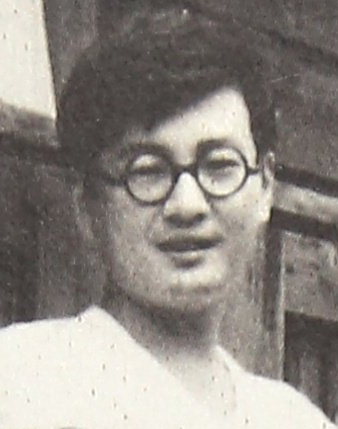

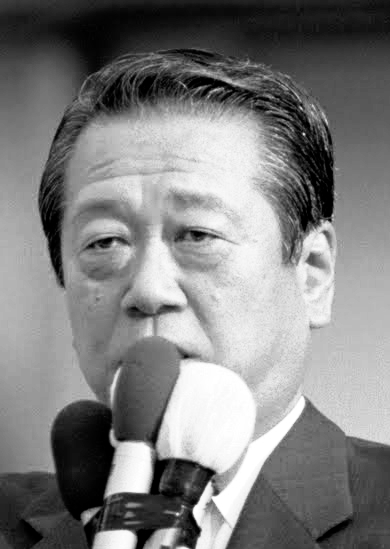

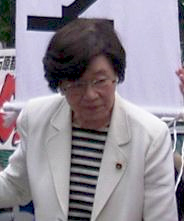
	First party	Second party	Third party
Leader	Junichiro Koizumi	Yukio Hatoyama	Takenori Kanzaki
Party	LDP	Democratic	Komeito
Last election	102 seats	47 seats	22 seats
Seats won	64	26	13
Seats after	110	59	23
Seat change	▲8	▲12	▲1
Constituency vote	22,299,825	10,066,552	3,468,664
% and swing	41.04% (▲10.59pp)	18.53% (▲2.33pp)	6.38% (▲3.08pp)
National vote	21,114,727	8,990,524	8,187,804
% and swing	38.57% (▲13.40pp)	16.42% (▼5.33pp)	14.96% (▲1.16pp)
	Fourth party	Fifth party	Sixth party
Leader	Tetsuzo Fuwa	Ichirō Ozawa	Takako Doi
Party	JCP	Liberal	Social Democratic
Last election	23 seats	12 seats	13 seats
Seats won	5	6	3
Seats after	20	8	8
Seat change	▼3	▼4	▼5
Constituency vote	5,362,958	3,011,787	1,874,299
% and swing	9.87% (▼5.79pp)	5.54% (▲3.79pp)	3.45% (▼0.85pp)
National vote	4,329,210	4,227,148	3,628,635
% and swing	7.91% (▼6.69pp)	7.72% (▼1.56pp)	6.63% (▼1.16pp)
- Constituency and proportional representation (bottom right) election result
President of the House
of Councillors before election
Yutaka Inoue
LDP
Elected President of the House
of Councillors
Yutaka Inoue
LDP

House of Councillors elections were held in Japan on 29 July 2001. They were the first national elections since Junichiro Koizumi became Prime Minister after Yoshiro Mori resigned in April 2001. The Liberal Democratic Party (LDP) and its election allies, were the major winner, provided Koizumi a strong mandates to move forward with his reform policies. The ruling coalition performed well, and regain their majority in the House of Councillors.

== Background ==
The electoral reform enacted in 2000 became effective for the first time. The number of Councillors per election was reduced by five, by two in the nationwide proportional representation and by one each in Okayama, Kumamoto and Kagoshima. In addition, preference voting was introduced. Instead of a party name, voters could now write the name of a single PR candidate on the ballot. The vote then counts for the party as well as the candidate; the total number of votes for a party list or its candidates determines the number of PR seats a party receives while the candidate votes determine who takes those seats for the party.

As a result of the party realignments of the 1990s, several two-member districts were represented by two Councillors from the same party before the 2001 election. Some of these Councillors lost the official nomination of their party (e.g. in Niigata), others retired (Hokkaidō, Tochigi). Most of these district split seats between ruling coalition and opposition again, in the case of both incumbents seeking re-election resulting in one of the two losing their seat (Nagano, Shizuoka).

== Results ==
Party	National			Constituency			Seats			
Party	Votes	%	Seats	Votes	%	Seats	Not up	Won	Total after	+/–
Liberal Democratic Party	21,114,727	38.57	20	22,299,825	41.04	44	46	64	110	+8
Democratic Party of Japan	8,990,524	16.42	8	10,066,552	18.53	18	33	26	59	+12
New Komeito Party	8,187,804	14.96	8	3,468,664	6.38	5	10	13	23	+1
Japanese Communist Party	4,329,210	7.91	4	5,362,958	9.87	1	15	5	20	–3
Liberal Party	4,227,148	7.72	4	3,011,787	5.54	2	2	6	8	–4
Social Democratic Party	3,628,635	6.63	3	1,874,299	3.45	0	5	3	8	–5
New Conservative Party	1,275,002	2.33	1				4	1	5	New
Liberal League	780,389	1.43	0	1,243,790	2.29	0	0	0	0	New
Dainiin Club	669,872	1.22	0				1	0	1	+1
Freedom and Hope	474,885	0.87	0				0	0	0	New
Women's Party	469,692	0.86	0	732,153	1.35	0	0	0	0	New
New Socialist Party of Japan	377,013	0.69	0	386,966	0.71	0	0	0	0	New
Independent Association	157,204	0.29	0				0	0	0	New
Ishin Seito Shimpu	59,385	0.11	0	72,066	0.13	0	0	0	0	New
Other parties				160,508	0.30	0	5	0	5	–
Independents				5,658,911	10.41	3	5	3	8	–18
**Total**	**54,741,490**	**100.00**	**48**	**54,338,479**	**100.00**	**73**	**126**	**121**	**247**	**–5**
Valid votes	54,741,490	95.77		54,338,479	95.10					
Invalid/blank votes	2,416,629	4.23		2,800,408	4.90					
Total votes	**57,158,119**	**100.00**		**57,138,887**	**100.00**					
Registered voters/turnout	101,309,680	56.42		101,236,029	56.44					
Source: Ministry of Internal Affairs and Communications, Tottori Prefecture, National Diet

=== Proportional representation results ===
The 2001 election was the first to use an open list system (非拘束名簿式) to elect proportional representation seats in the House. Under this system, voters may vote for either a political party or a specific candidate. The proportional seats are distributed among the parties by D'Hondt method according to their overall proportional votes, including candidate votes. The ranking of candidates on each party list is then determined by the candidate votes.

The results for the major parties were as follows (decimals omitted):

1. Liberal Democratic Party (Japan) (LDP): 21,114,727 (party: 14,925,437, candidates: 6,189,290), 38.6%, 20 seats
2. Democratic Party (DPJ): 8,990,524 (party: 6,082,694, candidates: 2,907,830), 16.4%, 8 seats
3. New Komeito (NK): 8,187,804 (party: 1,865,797, candidates: 6,322,007), 15.0%, 8 seats
4. Japan Communist Party (JCP): 4,329,210 (party: 4,065,047, candidates: 264,163), 7.9%, 4 seats
5. Liberal Party (LP): 4,227,148 (party: 3,642,884, candidates: 584,264), 7.7%, 4 seats
6. Social Democratic Party of Japan (SDP): 3,628,635 (party: 2,298,104, candidates: 1,330,531), 6.6%, 3 seats
7. Conservative Party of Japan (CP): 1,275,002 (party: 609,382, candidates: 665,620), 2.3%, 1 seat
8. Other parties (aggregate): 2.988.442, 5.5%, no seat

The final ranking of PR candidates and their individual vote counts were as follows:

1. Yoichi Masuzoe (LDP) 1,588,262

2. Kenji Koso (LDP) 478,985

3. Kyosen Ohashi (DPJ) 412,087

4. Kanae Yamamoto (NK) 1,287,549

5. Atsushi Onita (LDP) 460,421

6. Kiyoko Ono (LDP) 295,613

7. Masashi Fujiwara (DPJ) 259,576

8. Tomoko Kami (JCP) 56,999

9. Takeo Nishioka (LP) 121,617

10. Kuniomi Iwai (LDP) 278,521

11. Kentaro Koba (NK)

12. Yoko Tajima (SDP)

13. Seiko Hashimoto (LDP)

14. Hidemasa Otsuji (LDP)

15. Shuji Ikeguchi (DPJ)

16. Kiyohiko Toyama (NK)

17. Keizo Takemi (LDP)

18. Shin Sakurai (LDP)

19. Toshihiro Asahi (DPJ)

20. Hideyo Fudesaka (JCP)

21. Hideaki Tamura (LP)

22. Yukio Danmoto (LDP)

23. Shozo Kusakawa (NK)

24. Hirohide Uozumi (LDP)

25. Masahide Ota (SDP)

26. Hideki Wakabayashi (DPJ)

27. Kayoko Shimizu (LDP)

28. Takao Watanabe (NK)

29. Keishiro Fukushima (LDP)

30. Takeshi Kondo (LDP)

31. Mototaka Ito (DPJ)

32. Satoshi Inoue (JCP)

33. Tadashi Hirono (LP)

34. Tsuneo Morimoto (LDP)

35. Yuichiro Uozumi (NK)

36. Motoyuki Fujii (LDP)

37. Michio Sato (DPJ)

38. Chikage Ogi (CP)

39. Akiko Santo (LDP)

40. Seiji Mataichi (SDP)

41. Akio Koizumi (LDP)

42. Junichi Fukumoto (NK)

43. Mieko Kamimoto (DPJ)

44. Haruko Arimura (LDP)

45. Haruko Yoshikawa (JCP)

46. Yasuhiro Oe (LP)

47. So Nakahara (LDP)

48. Shuichi Kato (NK)

=== Prefectural races ===
Elected candidates in bold

Compiled from JANJAN's "The Senkyo" and Ministry of Internal Affairs and Communications official election results.

Notes:

- All incumbents not running for re-election in their prefectural electoral district are counted as retirements even if they ran in the nationwide proportional representation.
- In a multi-member district, there is no difference between Councillors elected with the highest and lower vote shares. Yet, "top tōsen", i.e. being elected with the highest vote, is considered a special achievement and thus noted where changed from the previous election for the same class of Councillors (1995).
- In the results column, independents are counted towards the party they joined in the first Diet session after the election.

Party abbreviations used:

- Ruling coalition
  - LDP Liberal Democratic Party
  - Kōmeitō "Justice Party"
  - CP Conservative Party
- Opposition
  - DPJ Democratic Party
  - JCP Japanese Communist Party
  - SDP Social Democratic Party
  - LP Liberal Party
- I Independent
- Minor parties: IA Independent Association, Dainiin Dainiin Club, LL Liberal League, Ishin Ishin Seitō Shinpū, WP Women's Party, NSP New Socialist Party, Kibō "New Party Freedom and Hope"

Northern Japan
Prefecture	Seats up	Incumbents	Party	Result	Candidates (Party) Vote share
Hokkaidō	2	Hisamitsu Kanno	DPJ	Incumbent re-elected Incumbent retired LDP **pickup** LDP gains top tōsen	**Chūichi Date (LDP) 39.3%** **Katsuya Ogawa (DPJ) 27.2%** Satoshi Miyauchi (JCP) 11.3% Masahito Nishikawa (LP) 7.8% Yoshiko Sugiyama (SDP) 6.6% Tamiko Matsumura (WP) 3.5% Mitsuhiro Yokoyama (I) 1.4% Akifumi Kumagai (LL) 1.3% Nobuyuki Saitō (NSP) 1.0% Nobuhito Sendai (Ishin) 0.5%
Hokkaidō	2	Katsuya Ogawa	DPJ	Incumbent re-elected Incumbent retired LDP **pickup** LDP gains top tōsen	**Chūichi Date (LDP) 39.3%** **Katsuya Ogawa (DPJ) 27.2%** Satoshi Miyauchi (JCP) 11.3% Masahito Nishikawa (LP) 7.8% Yoshiko Sugiyama (SDP) 6.6% Tamiko Matsumura (WP) 3.5% Mitsuhiro Yokoyama (I) 1.4% Akifumi Kumagai (LL) 1.3% Nobuyuki Saitō (NSP) 1.0% Nobuhito Sendai (Ishin) 0.5%
Aomori	1	Tsutomu Yamazaki	LDP	Incumbent re-elected	**Tsutomu Yamazaki (LDP) 53.7%** Hideshige Sasaki (I) 18.9% Isamu Moriuchi (I) 18.8% Hiroaki Takayanagi (JCP) 6.0% Kyōko Murata (LL) 2.6%
Iwate	1	Yoshinori Takahashi	LP	Incumbent retired LP hold	**Tatsuo Hirano (LP) 41.9%** Tokuichirō Tamazawa (LDP) 41.1% Kazue Yabuki (SDP) 8.8% Norikatsu Sugawara (JCP) 6.1% Riki Ishiwatari (LL) 2.2%
Miyagi	2	Tomiko Okazaki	DPJ	DPJ incumbent re-elected LDP incumbent lost re-election LDP hold	**Tomiko Okazaki (DPJ) 32.2%** **Jirō Aichi (I – LDP, Kōmeitō, CP) 27.5%** Hiroaki Kameya (LDP) 25.9% Masatoshi Yoshida (SDP) 6.1% Toshirō Ono (JCP) 5.9% Kiyoharu Satō (LL) 2.3%
Miyagi	2	Hiroaki Kameya	LDP	DPJ incumbent re-elected LDP incumbent lost re-election LDP hold	**Tomiko Okazaki (DPJ) 32.2%** **Jirō Aichi (I – LDP, Kōmeitō, CP) 27.5%** Hiroaki Kameya (LDP) 25.9% Masatoshi Yoshida (SDP) 6.1% Toshirō Ono (JCP) 5.9% Kiyoharu Satō (LL) 2.3%
Akita	1	Katsutoshi Kaneda	LDP	Incumbent re-elected	**Katsutoshi Kaneda (LDP) 54.2%** Kazuo Takamatsu (DPJ) 17.9% Nagahide Sasaki (SDP) 14.6% Toshio Suzuki (JCP) 8.0% Sachiko Saitō (LL) 5.2%
Yamagata	1	Masatoshi Abe	LDP	Incumbent re-elected	**Masatoshi Abe (LDP) 51.5%** Kanji Kimura (I) 36.1% Toshio Ōta (JCP) 6.4% Fumiyuki Monma (LL) 3.6% Tsuneyoshi Chiba (NSP) 2.4%
Fukushima	2	Toyoaki Ōta	LDP	Incumbents re-elected	**Toyoaki Ōta (LDP) 40.5%** **Hiroko Wada (DPJ) 22.7%** Kaori Kanda (I) 11.7% Keiichi Miho (I) 9.8% Masanari Kawada (LP) 7.3% Masayo Niimi (JCP) 6.2% Takao Suzuki (LL) 1.8%
Fukushima	2	Hiroko Wada	DPJ	Incumbents re-elected	**Toyoaki Ōta (LDP) 40.5%** **Hiroko Wada (DPJ) 22.7%** Kaori Kanda (I) 11.7% Keiichi Miho (I) 9.8% Masanari Kawada (LP) 7.3% Masayo Niimi (JCP) 6.2% Takao Suzuki (LL) 1.8%
Eastern and Central Japan
Prefecture	Seats up	Incumbents	Party	Result	Candidates (Party – endorsements) Vote share
Ibaraki	2	Yasu Kanō	LDP	Incumbents re-elected	**Yasu Kanō (LDP) 49.3%** **Moto Kobayashi (DPJ) 23.3%** Masako Katō (LP) 10.4% Toyomasa Komatsu (JCP) 6.1% Mariko Yoshioka (WP) 5.7% Hiromitsu Mutō (LL) 2.8% Hiroyuki Sugimori (NSP) 2.4%
Ibaraki	2	Moto Kobayashi	DPJ	Incumbents re-elected	**Yasu Kanō (LDP) 49.3%** **Moto Kobayashi (DPJ) 23.3%** Masako Katō (LP) 10.4% Toyomasa Komatsu (JCP) 6.1% Mariko Yoshioka (WP) 5.7% Hiromitsu Mutō (LL) 2.8% Hiroyuki Sugimori (NSP) 2.4%
Tochigi	2	Junzō Iwasaki	LDP	Incumbent re-elected Incumbent retired DPJ **pickup**	**Masayuki Kunii (LDP) 38.6%** **Hiroyuki Tani (DPJ) 28.0%** Toshikazu Masabuchi (I) 24.3% Setsuko Nomura (JCP) 5.5% Mayumi Yotsumoto (LL) 2.2% Morio Asai (NSP) 1.3%
Tochigi	2	Masayuki Kunii	LDP	Incumbent re-elected Incumbent retired DPJ **pickup**	**Masayuki Kunii (LDP) 38.6%** **Hiroyuki Tani (DPJ) 28.0%** Toshikazu Masabuchi (I) 24.3% Setsuko Nomura (JCP) 5.5% Mayumi Yotsumoto (LL) 2.2% Morio Asai (NSP) 1.3%
Gunma	2	Ichita Yamamoto	LDP	Incumbents re-elected	**Ichita Yamamoto (LDP) 40.4%** **Giichi Tsunoda (DPJ) 27.8%** Mayumi Yoshikawa (LDP) 24.7% Shinmei Ogasawara (JCP) 5.1% Haruyo Tsuchiya (LL) 2.1%
Gunma	2	Giichi Tsunoda	DPJ	Incumbents re-elected	**Ichita Yamamoto (LDP) 40.4%** **Giichi Tsunoda (DPJ) 27.8%** Mayumi Yoshikawa (LDP) 24.7% Shinmei Ogasawara (JCP) 5.1% Haruyo Tsuchiya (LL) 2.1%
Saitama	3	Hiroshi Takano	Kōmeitō	Kōmeitō and LDP incumbents re-elected LDP gains top tōsen JCP incumbent lost re-election DPJ **pickup**	**Taizō Satō (LDP) 25.3%** **Hiroshi Takano (Kōmeitō) 20.2%** **Ryūji Yamane (DPJ) 15.1%** Sachiko Abe (JCP) 13.5% Yasuko Komiyama (LP) 12.4% Chūkō Hayakawa (I) 4.5% Takeo Amatatsu (SDP) 3.9% Hiroko Hayashi (LL) 2.4% Takuya Ogawa (I) 0.9% Morio Katō (I) 0.7% Setsuo Yamaguchi (I) 0.5% Fumikazu Murata (NSP) 0.4% Masakazu Imazawa (Ishin) 0.2%
Saitama	3	Taizō Satō	LDP	Kōmeitō and LDP incumbents re-elected LDP gains top tōsen JCP incumbent lost re-election DPJ **pickup**	**Taizō Satō (LDP) 25.3%** **Hiroshi Takano (Kōmeitō) 20.2%** **Ryūji Yamane (DPJ) 15.1%** Sachiko Abe (JCP) 13.5% Yasuko Komiyama (LP) 12.4% Chūkō Hayakawa (I) 4.5% Takeo Amatatsu (SDP) 3.9% Hiroko Hayashi (LL) 2.4% Takuya Ogawa (I) 0.9% Morio Katō (I) 0.7% Setsuo Yamaguchi (I) 0.5% Fumikazu Murata (NSP) 0.4% Masakazu Imazawa (Ishin) 0.2%
Saitama	3	Sachiko Abe	JCP	Kōmeitō and LDP incumbents re-elected LDP gains top tōsen JCP incumbent lost re-election DPJ **pickup**	**Taizō Satō (LDP) 25.3%** **Hiroshi Takano (Kōmeitō) 20.2%** **Ryūji Yamane (DPJ) 15.1%** Sachiko Abe (JCP) 13.5% Yasuko Komiyama (LP) 12.4% Chūkō Hayakawa (I) 4.5% Takeo Amatatsu (SDP) 3.9% Hiroko Hayashi (LL) 2.4% Takuya Ogawa (I) 0.9% Morio Katō (I) 0.7% Setsuo Yamaguchi (I) 0.5% Fumikazu Murata (NSP) 0.4% Masakazu Imazawa (Ishin) 0.2%
Chiba	2	Akira Imaizumi	DPJ	Incumbents re-elected LDP gains top tōsen	**Hiroyuki Kurata (LDP) 43.8%** **Akira Imaizumi (DPJ) 16.3%** Kazumasa Okajima (LP) 15.9% Tomoko Hoshino (I) 10.1% Makoto Nakajima (JCP) 9.0% Yumiko Nakaue (LL) 3.3% Hirokuni Osanami (NSP) 1.5%
Chiba	2	Hiroyuki Kurata	LDP	Incumbents re-elected LDP gains top tōsen	**Hiroyuki Kurata (LDP) 43.8%** **Akira Imaizumi (DPJ) 16.3%** Kazumasa Okajima (LP) 15.9% Tomoko Hoshino (I) 10.1% Makoto Nakajima (JCP) 9.0% Yumiko Nakaue (LL) 3.3% Hirokuni Osanami (NSP) 1.5%
Tokyo	4	Yūichirō Uozumi	Kōmeitō	LDP and JCP incumbents re-elected Kōmeitō and SDP incumbent retired Kōmeitō hold LDP gains top tōsen DPJ **pickup**	**Sanzō Hosaka (LDP) 27.9%** **Natsuo Yamaguchi (Kōmeitō) 17.5%** **Kan Suzuki (DPJ) 15.1%** **Yasuo Ogata (JCP) 12.5%** Nobuhiko Endō (LP) 7.2% Kei Hata (I) 4.2% Tetsu Ueda (I) 4.2% Chizuko Koroiwa (I) 3.3% Sadaharu Hirota (SDP) 3.2% Itaru Kobayashi (LL) 2.1% Hanako Igarashi (WP) 1.8% Shigeo Arakaki (I) 0.6% Chōzō Nakagawa (I) 0.3 % Hisatoshi Hashimoto (Ishin) 0.2% Toshirō Saitō (I) 0.2%
Tokyo	4	Sanzō Hosaka	LDP	LDP and JCP incumbents re-elected Kōmeitō and SDP incumbent retired Kōmeitō hold LDP gains top tōsen DPJ **pickup**	**Sanzō Hosaka (LDP) 27.9%** **Natsuo Yamaguchi (Kōmeitō) 17.5%** **Kan Suzuki (DPJ) 15.1%** **Yasuo Ogata (JCP) 12.5%** Nobuhiko Endō (LP) 7.2% Kei Hata (I) 4.2% Tetsu Ueda (I) 4.2% Chizuko Koroiwa (I) 3.3% Sadaharu Hirota (SDP) 3.2% Itaru Kobayashi (LL) 2.1% Hanako Igarashi (WP) 1.8% Shigeo Arakaki (I) 0.6% Chōzō Nakagawa (I) 0.3 % Hisatoshi Hashimoto (Ishin) 0.2% Toshirō Saitō (I) 0.2%
Tokyo	4	Yasuo Ogata	JCP	LDP and JCP incumbents re-elected Kōmeitō and SDP incumbent retired Kōmeitō hold LDP gains top tōsen DPJ **pickup**	**Sanzō Hosaka (LDP) 27.9%** **Natsuo Yamaguchi (Kōmeitō) 17.5%** **Kan Suzuki (DPJ) 15.1%** **Yasuo Ogata (JCP) 12.5%** Nobuhiko Endō (LP) 7.2% Kei Hata (I) 4.2% Tetsu Ueda (I) 4.2% Chizuko Koroiwa (I) 3.3% Sadaharu Hirota (SDP) 3.2% Itaru Kobayashi (LL) 2.1% Hanako Igarashi (WP) 1.8% Shigeo Arakaki (I) 0.6% Chōzō Nakagawa (I) 0.3 % Hisatoshi Hashimoto (Ishin) 0.2% Toshirō Saitō (I) 0.2%
Tokyo	4	Hideo Den	SDP	LDP and JCP incumbents re-elected Kōmeitō and SDP incumbent retired Kōmeitō hold LDP gains top tōsen DPJ **pickup**	**Sanzō Hosaka (LDP) 27.9%** **Natsuo Yamaguchi (Kōmeitō) 17.5%** **Kan Suzuki (DPJ) 15.1%** **Yasuo Ogata (JCP) 12.5%** Nobuhiko Endō (LP) 7.2% Kei Hata (I) 4.2% Tetsu Ueda (I) 4.2% Chizuko Koroiwa (I) 3.3% Sadaharu Hirota (SDP) 3.2% Itaru Kobayashi (LL) 2.1% Hanako Igarashi (WP) 1.8% Shigeo Arakaki (I) 0.6% Chōzō Nakagawa (I) 0.3 % Hisatoshi Hashimoto (Ishin) 0.2% Toshirō Saitō (I) 0.2%
Kanagawa	3	Akira Matsu	Kōmeitō	DPJ and Kōmeitō incumbents re-elected LDP incumbent retires LDP hold LDP gains top tōsen	**Yutaka Kobayashi (LDP) 35.4%** **Akira Matsu (Kōmeitō) 18.0%** **Tsuyoshi Saitō (DPJ) 16.3%** Keiko Ueda (SDP) 8.4% Masataka Ōta (LP) 8.4% Hiroyuki Muneta (JCP) 8.2% Eriko Kurata (WP) 2.2% Hirohisa Miwa (LL) 1.5% Ranko Kawamura (I) 0.8% Yoshiko Bannai (NSP) 0.4% Takeshi Miwa (Ishin) 0.4%
Kanagawa	3	Kiyoharu Ishiawata	LDP	DPJ and Kōmeitō incumbents re-elected LDP incumbent retires LDP hold LDP gains top tōsen	**Yutaka Kobayashi (LDP) 35.4%** **Akira Matsu (Kōmeitō) 18.0%** **Tsuyoshi Saitō (DPJ) 16.3%** Keiko Ueda (SDP) 8.4% Masataka Ōta (LP) 8.4% Hiroyuki Muneta (JCP) 8.2% Eriko Kurata (WP) 2.2% Hirohisa Miwa (LL) 1.5% Ranko Kawamura (I) 0.8% Yoshiko Bannai (NSP) 0.4% Takeshi Miwa (Ishin) 0.4%
Kanagawa	3	Tsuyoshi Saitō	DPJ	DPJ and Kōmeitō incumbents re-elected LDP incumbent retires LDP hold LDP gains top tōsen	**Yutaka Kobayashi (LDP) 35.4%** **Akira Matsu (Kōmeitō) 18.0%** **Tsuyoshi Saitō (DPJ) 16.3%** Keiko Ueda (SDP) 8.4% Masataka Ōta (LP) 8.4% Hiroyuki Muneta (JCP) 8.2% Eriko Kurata (WP) 2.2% Hirohisa Miwa (LL) 1.5% Ranko Kawamura (I) 0.8% Yoshiko Bannai (NSP) 0.4% Takeshi Miwa (Ishin) 0.4%
Niigata	2	Yoshio Yoshikawa	LDP	Incumbent retired Incumbent lost re-election LDP hold LP **pickup**	**Kazuo Majima (LDP) 35.7%** **Yūko Mori (LP) 14.9%** Junko Uchida (SDP) 14.2% Nobuyuki Sekiyama (DPJ) 14.2% Michio Hasegawa (I) 13.8% Kayoko Kuwahara (JCP) 6.2% Nobuaki Shinozaki (LL) 0.8%
Niigata	2	Michio Hasegawa	LDP	Incumbent retired Incumbent lost re-election LDP hold LP **pickup**	**Kazuo Majima (LDP) 35.7%** **Yūko Mori (LP) 14.9%** Junko Uchida (SDP) 14.2% Nobuyuki Sekiyama (DPJ) 14.2% Michio Hasegawa (I) 13.8% Kayoko Kuwahara (JCP) 6.2% Nobuaki Shinozaki (LL) 0.8%
Toyama	1	Yasumasa Kakuma	LDP	Incumbent retired LDP hold	**Kōtarō Nogami (LDP) 65.8%** Yasuharu Kusajima (I) 24.3% Hiroshi Sakamoto (JCP) 7.1% Kazue Kubokawa (LL) 2.8%
Ishikawa	1	Tetsuo Kutsukake	LDP	Incumbent re-elected	**Tetsuo Kutsukake (LDP) 57.0%** Chieko Morioka (I) 33.3% Yōko Onishi (JCP) 6.7% Hideyuki Tanabe (LL) 2.9%
Fukui	1	Ryūji Matsumura	LDP	Incumbent re-elected	**Ryūji Matsumura (LDP) 63.0%** Kikuko Ozawa (DPJ) 27.2% Kunihiro Uno (JCP) 7.2% Tōru Yamaguchi (LL) 2.6%
Yamanashi	1	Mahito Nakajima	LDP	Incumbent re-elected	**Mahito Nakajima (LDP) 48.6%** Yūichi Higuchi (DPJ) 33.5% Akiko Endō (JCP) 8.0% Hiroshi Shōji (LP) 7.6% Chihoko Katō (LL) 2.3%
Nagano	2	Mineo Koyama	DPJ	Incumbent re-elected Incumbent lost re-election LDP **pickup** LDP gains top tōsen	**Hiromi Yoshida (LDP) 32.9%** **Yūichirō Hata (DPJ) 27.8%** Mineo Koyama (DPJ) 16.8% Norihisa Yamaguchi (JCP) 11.1% Setsuko Satō (SDP) 9.0% Nobuyuki Watanabe (LL) 2.4%
Nagano	2	Yūichirō Hata	DPJ	Incumbent re-elected Incumbent lost re-election LDP **pickup** LDP gains top tōsen	**Hiromi Yoshida (LDP) 32.9%** **Yūichirō Hata (DPJ) 27.8%** Mineo Koyama (DPJ) 16.8% Norihisa Yamaguchi (JCP) 11.1% Setsuko Satō (SDP) 9.0% Nobuyuki Watanabe (LL) 2.4%
Gifu	2	Tsuyako Ōno	LDP	Incumbents re-elected	**Tsuyako Ōno (LDP) 55.4%** **Kenji Hirata (DPJ) 30.4%** Takao Katō (JCP) 10.4% Michiko Higuchi (LL) 3.8%
Gifu	2	Kenji Hirata	DPJ	Incumbents re-elected	**Tsuyako Ōno (LDP) 55.4%** **Kenji Hirata (DPJ) 30.4%** Takao Katō (JCP) 10.4% Michiko Higuchi (LL) 3.8%
Shizuoka	2	Masataka Suzuki	LDP	Incumbent re-elected Incumbent lost re-election DPJ **pickup**	**Yutaka Takeyama (LDP) 31.7%** **Kazuya Shinba (DPJ) 27.5%** Masataka Suzuki (LDP) 22.1% Yukihiro Shimazu (JCP) 8.3% Hiroko Suzuki (WP) 5.5% Naoko Hara (LL) 4.8%
Shizuoka	2	Yutaka Takeyama	LDP	Incumbent re-elected Incumbent lost re-election DPJ **pickup**	**Yutaka Takeyama (LDP) 31.7%** **Kazuya Shinba (DPJ) 27.5%** Masataka Suzuki (LDP) 22.1% Yukihiro Shimazu (JCP) 8.3% Hiroko Suzuki (WP) 5.5% Naoko Hara (LL) 4.8%
Aichi	3	Tamotsu Yamamoto	Kōmeitō	LDP and Kōmeitō incumbents re-elected LDP incumbent retired LDP gains top tōsen DPJ **pickup**	**Seiji Suzuki (LDP) 34.6%** **Kōhei Ōtsuka (DPJ) 23.5%** **Tamotsu Yamamoto (Kōmeitō) 17.8%** Aiko Saitō (JCP) 9.9% Masayuki Miyata (LP) 4.7% Hiroaki Sago (SDP) 2.9% Fusarō Sekiguchi (I) 1.5% Kiyoko Osada (LL) 1.0% Hachirō Ishikawa (LP) 0.7% Tsutomu Suzuki (I) 0.6% Reiko Yasuda (I) 0.5% Kenji Sasaki (I) 0.4% Akihiko Ishikawa (I) 0.3% Yoshiaki Yamazaki (I) 0.3% Yasuo Okayasu (NLP) 0.3% 7 other candidates 1.0%
Aichi	3	Seiji Suzuki	LDP	LDP and Kōmeitō incumbents re-elected LDP incumbent retired LDP gains top tōsen DPJ **pickup**	**Seiji Suzuki (LDP) 34.6%** **Kōhei Ōtsuka (DPJ) 23.5%** **Tamotsu Yamamoto (Kōmeitō) 17.8%** Aiko Saitō (JCP) 9.9% Masayuki Miyata (LP) 4.7% Hiroaki Sago (SDP) 2.9% Fusarō Sekiguchi (I) 1.5% Kiyoko Osada (LL) 1.0% Hachirō Ishikawa (LP) 0.7% Tsutomu Suzuki (I) 0.6% Reiko Yasuda (I) 0.5% Kenji Sasaki (I) 0.4% Akihiko Ishikawa (I) 0.3% Yoshiaki Yamazaki (I) 0.3% Yasuo Okayasu (NLP) 0.3% 7 other candidates 1.0%
Aichi	3	Makiko Suehiro	LDP	LDP and Kōmeitō incumbents re-elected LDP incumbent retired LDP gains top tōsen DPJ **pickup**	**Seiji Suzuki (LDP) 34.6%** **Kōhei Ōtsuka (DPJ) 23.5%** **Tamotsu Yamamoto (Kōmeitō) 17.8%** Aiko Saitō (JCP) 9.9% Masayuki Miyata (LP) 4.7% Hiroaki Sago (SDP) 2.9% Fusarō Sekiguchi (I) 1.5% Kiyoko Osada (LL) 1.0% Hachirō Ishikawa (LP) 0.7% Tsutomu Suzuki (I) 0.6% Reiko Yasuda (I) 0.5% Kenji Sasaki (I) 0.4% Akihiko Ishikawa (I) 0.3% Yoshiaki Yamazaki (I) 0.3% Yasuo Okayasu (NLP) 0.3% 7 other candidates 1.0%
Mie	1	Chiaki Takahashi	Independent	Incumbent re-elected	**Chiaki Takahashi (I) 46.5%** Kazumi Fujioka (LDP) 43.5% Miyoshi Taninaka (JCP) 7.0% Tōru Ishitani (LL) 3.1%
Western Japan
Prefecture	Seats up	Incumbents	Party	Result	Candidates (Party – endorsements) Vote share
Shiga	1	Hidetoshi Yamashita	LDP	Incumbent re-elected	**Hidetoshi Yamashita (LDP) 55.0%** Shun'yū Norikumo (DPJ) 27.9% Takaishi Kawauchi (JCP) 11.3% Midori Kitada (LL) 5.8%
Kyōto	2	Yoshihiro Nishida	LDP	LDP incumbent re-elected Independent incumbent lost re-election Democratic hold	**Yoshihiro Nishida (LDP) 38.5%** **Kōji Matsui (DPJ) 23.5%** Yōko Kawakami (JCP) 22.1% Teiko Sasano (I) 12.6% Kaori Endō (LL) 3.3%
Kyōto	2	Teiko Sasano	Independent	LDP incumbent re-elected Independent incumbent lost re-election Democratic hold	**Yoshihiro Nishida (LDP) 38.5%** **Kōji Matsui (DPJ) 23.5%** Yōko Kawakami (JCP) 22.1% Teiko Sasano (I) 12.6% Kaori Endō (LL) 3.3%
Ōsaka	3	Kazuyoshi Shirahama	Kōmeitō	LDP and Kōmeitō incumbents re-elected JCP incumbent lost re-election LDP gains top tōsen DPJ **pickup**	**Shūzen Tanigawa (LDP) 26.6%** **Kazuyoshi Shirahama (Kōmeitō) 24.7%** **Takashi Yamamoto (DPJ) 17.2%** Yoshiki Yamashita (JCP) 17.0% Yoshihiko Watanabe (LP) 5.6% Takahiro Kitaoka (Koizumi no Kai) 3.3% Kazuko Doi (WP) 2.9% Tomohiko Ōkawa (LL) 1.0% Keiji Kashimoto (NSP) 0.7% Kyōsuke Morimoto (I) 0.7% Ryūichi Nakatani (Ishin) 0.3%
Ōsaka	3	Yoshiki Yamashita	JCP	LDP and Kōmeitō incumbents re-elected JCP incumbent lost re-election LDP gains top tōsen DPJ **pickup**	**Shūzen Tanigawa (LDP) 26.6%** **Kazuyoshi Shirahama (Kōmeitō) 24.7%** **Takashi Yamamoto (DPJ) 17.2%** Yoshiki Yamashita (JCP) 17.0% Yoshihiko Watanabe (LP) 5.6% Takahiro Kitaoka (Koizumi no Kai) 3.3% Kazuko Doi (WP) 2.9% Tomohiko Ōkawa (LL) 1.0% Keiji Kashimoto (NSP) 0.7% Kyōsuke Morimoto (I) 0.7% Ryūichi Nakatani (Ishin) 0.3%
Ōsaka	3	Shūzen Tanigawa	LDP	LDP and Kōmeitō incumbents re-elected JCP incumbent lost re-election LDP gains top tōsen DPJ **pickup**	**Shūzen Tanigawa (LDP) 26.6%** **Kazuyoshi Shirahama (Kōmeitō) 24.7%** **Takashi Yamamoto (DPJ) 17.2%** Yoshiki Yamashita (JCP) 17.0% Yoshihiko Watanabe (LP) 5.6% Takahiro Kitaoka (Koizumi no Kai) 3.3% Kazuko Doi (WP) 2.9% Tomohiko Ōkawa (LL) 1.0% Keiji Kashimoto (NSP) 0.7% Kyōsuke Morimoto (I) 0.7% Ryūichi Nakatani (Ishin) 0.3%
Hyōgo	2	Ichiji Ishii	LL	LL incumbent retired LDP incumbent re-elected LDP gains top tōsen DPJ **pickup**	**Yoshitada Kōnoike (LDP) 39.3%** **Yasuhiro Tsuji (DPJ) 23.7%** Junko Hiramatsu (JCP) 14.3% Kunihiko Muroi (LP) 9.3% Aiko Takada (WP) 6.1% Keiji Ueno (NSP) 3.1% Toyoaki Tagawa (LL) 2.3% Shōhei Fujiki (I) 1.9%
Hyōgo	2	Yoshitada Kōnoike	LDP	LL incumbent retired LDP incumbent re-elected LDP gains top tōsen DPJ **pickup**	**Yoshitada Kōnoike (LDP) 39.3%** **Yasuhiro Tsuji (DPJ) 23.7%** Junko Hiramatsu (JCP) 14.3% Kunihiko Muroi (LP) 9.3% Aiko Takada (WP) 6.1% Keiji Ueno (NSP) 3.1% Toyoaki Tagawa (LL) 2.3% Shōhei Fujiki (I) 1.9%
Nara	1	Yukihisa Yoshida	DPJ	Incumbent retired LDP **pickup**	**Shōgo Arai (LDP) 43.9%** Takeshi Maeda (DPJ) 39.2% Shōji Kamano (JCP) 8.2% Yukiko Sugita (SDP) 6.6% Yasuhiro Okai (LL) 2.2%
Wakayama	1	Hiroshige Sekō	LDP	Incumbent re-elected	**Hiroshige Sekō (LDP) 67.7%** Fuminori Kimura (DPJ) 14.7% Yasuhisa Hara (JCP) 13.7% Toyoko Nishioka (LL) 3.9%
Tottori	1	Takayoshi Tsuneda	LDP	Incumbent re-elected	**Takayoshi Tsuneda (LDP) 56.5%** Makoto Satō (DPJ) 22.4% Tomoko Ichitani (JCP) 10.9% Satomi Yamamoto (SDP) 7.0% Masashi Yamaguchi (LL) 3.2%
Shimane	1	Shuntarō Kageyama	LDP	Incumbent re-elected	**Shuntarō Kageyama (LDP) 68.1%** Kazuhisa Hamaguchi (DPJ) 18.7% Katsuhiko Gotō (JCP) 9.1% Junko Nakashima (LL) 4.0%
Okayama	1	Toranosuke Katayama	LDP	1 seat lost by reapportionment LDP incumbent re-elected DPJ incumbent lost re-election	**Toranosuke Katayama (LDP) 61.0%** Mie Ishida (DPJ) 28.8% Hisaki Moriwaki (JCP) 8.2% Keiko Asawa (LL) 2.0%
Okayama	1	Yukihisa Yoshida	DPJ	1 seat lost by reapportionment LDP incumbent re-elected DPJ incumbent lost re-election	**Toranosuke Katayama (LDP) 61.0%** Mie Ishida (DPJ) 28.8% Hisaki Moriwaki (JCP) 8.2% Keiko Asawa (LL) 2.0%
Hiroshima	2	Kensei Mizote	LDP	LDP incumbent re-elected DPJ incumbent lost re-election LDP **pickup**	**Takeaki Kashimura (I) 36.4%** **Kensei Mizote (LDP) 31.9%** Kenji Sugekawa (DPJ) 17.0% Kimiko Kurihara (NSP) 6.5% Satoshi Fujimoto (JCP) 6.1% Hidemi Yamada (LL) 2.0%
Hiroshima	2	Kenji Sugekawa	DPJ	LDP incumbent re-elected DPJ incumbent lost re-election LDP **pickup**	**Takeaki Kashimura (I) 36.4%** **Kensei Mizote (LDP) 31.9%** Kenji Sugekawa (DPJ) 17.0% Kimiko Kurihara (NSP) 6.5% Satoshi Fujimoto (JCP) 6.1% Hidemi Yamada (LL) 2.0%
Yamaguchi	1	Yoshimasa Hayashi	LDP	Incumbent re-elected	**Yoshimasa Hayashi (LDP) 61.4%** Susumu Iwamoto (DPJ) 25.5% Tomoyuki Uonaga (JCP) 9.3% Tadao Sasaki (LL) 2.2% Tsuyoshi Nakashima (Ishin) 1.5%
Tokushima	1	Shūji Kitaoka	LDP	Incumbent re-elected	**Shūji Kitaoka (LDP) 54.3%** Kiyoshi Kimura (DPJ) 31.8% Hitoshi Fujita (JCP) 7.2% Chiyoko Takagai (NSP) 5.4% Kōichi Maekawa (LL) 1.3%
Kagawa	1	Kenji Manabe	LDP	Incumbent re-elected	**Kenji Manabe (LDP) 62.1%** Midori Nagura (I) 18.9% Yōko Shirakawa (JCP) 14.2% Mie Tanaka (LL) 4.9%
Ehime	1	Katsutsugu Sekiya	LDP	Incumbent re-elected	**Katsutsugu Sekiya (LDP) 61.0%** Takashi Shimakawa (I) 25.8% Hisao Yamamoto (JCP) 8.4% Yoshiko Oguri (LL) 4.8%
Kōchi	1	Kōhei Tamura	LDP	Incumbent re-elected	**Kōhei Tamura (LDP) 40.0%** Hajime Hirota (I) 30.3% Kumi Nakamura (DPJ) 16.6% Sachi Nakane (JCP) 12.1% Kiyotaka Maeda (LL) 0.9%
Southern Japan
Prefecture	Seats up	Incumbents	Party	Result	Candidates (Party – endorsements) Vote share
Fukuoka	2	Kentarō Koba	Kōmeitō	Kōmeitō incumbent retired SDP incumbent lost re-election LDP **pickup**	**Masaji Matsuyama (LDP) 30.6%** **Tsukasa Iwamoto (DPJ) 16.7%** Chū Furukawa (I) 16.3% Shigeko Mieno (SDP) 12.7% Jun'ichirō Koga (LP) 10.3% Toyoomi Tsuno (JCP) 7.9% Yukimi Kamemoto (WP) 3.9% Miyoko Jōno (LL) 1.6%
Fukuoka	2	Shigeko Mieno	SDP	LDP gains top tōsen DPJ **pickup**	**Masaji Matsuyama (LDP) 30.6%** **Tsukasa Iwamoto (DPJ) 16.7%** Chū Furukawa (I) 16.3% Shigeko Mieno (SDP) 12.7% Jun'ichirō Koga (LP) 10.3% Toyoomi Tsuno (JCP) 7.9% Yukimi Kamemoto (WP) 3.9% Miyoko Jōno (LL) 1.6%
Saga	1	Takao Jinnouchi	LDP	Incumbent re-elected	**Takao Jinnouchi (LDP) 65.0%** Yasuhiro Fujino (DPJ) 23.2% Yasutoshi Kamimura (JCP) 7.3% Yasuhiro Fukagawa (LL) 4.5%
Nagasaki	1	Tadashi Taura	LDP	Incumbent re-elected	**Tadashi Taura (LDP) 53.4%** Yūji Mitsuno (I) 29.3% Kōtarō Tanaka (I) 6.9% Kimiko Ogawa (JCP) 6.6% Sachiko Matsumoto (LL) 3.8%
Kumamoto	1	Hirohide Uozumi	Independent	1 seat lost by reapportionment Independent incumbent retired LDP incumbent re-elected	**Issei Miura (LDP) 55.5%** Mariko Kōyama (DPJ) 34.8% Etsuko Nishikawa (JCP) 5.4% Kazuo Misumi (LL) 2.5% Hirofumi Ishida (NSP) 1.8%
Kumamoto	1	Issei Miura	LDP	1 seat lost by reapportionment Independent incumbent retired LDP incumbent re-elected	**Issei Miura (LDP) 55.5%** Mariko Kōyama (DPJ) 34.8% Etsuko Nishikawa (JCP) 5.4% Kazuo Misumi (LL) 2.5% Hirofumi Ishida (NSP) 1.8%
Ōita	1	Keigi Kajiwara	SDP	Incumbent lost re-election LDP **pickup**	**Hiroko Gotō (LDP) 49.4%** Keigi Kajiwara (SDP) 43.4% Masami Doi (JCP) 5.2% Kayoko Kōno (LL) 2.1%
Miyazaki	1	Motoi Nagamine	LDP	Incumbent lost re-election LDP hold	**Toshifumi Kosehira (LDP) 35.3%** Haruo Higashi (I) 30.5% Motoi Nagamine (I) 27.5% Hiromitsu Baba (JCP) 4.1% Yutaka Kohata (LL) 2.6%
Kagoshima	1	Kaname Kamada	LDP	1 seat lost by reapportionment Incumbents retired LDP hold	**Yoshito Kajiya (LDP) 55.7%** Masahiro Futamure (I) 27.9% Mitsuhiro Yanagida (I) 7.4% Haruki Yamaguchi (JCP) 4.7% Kyōko Hata (NSP) 4.2%
Kagoshima	1	Wataru Kubo	DPJ	1 seat lost by reapportionment Incumbents retired LDP hold	**Yoshito Kajiya (LDP) 55.7%** Masahiro Futamure (I) 27.9% Mitsuhiro Yanagida (I) 7.4% Haruki Yamaguchi (JCP) 4.7% Kyōko Hata (NSP) 4.2%
Okinawa	1	Teruya Kantoku	Independent	Incumbent lost re-election LDP **pickup**	**Junshirō Nishime (LDP – Kōmeitō, CP) 47.7%** Teruya Kantoku (I – DPJ, LP, SDP, OSMP, LL) 44.0% Sōgi Kayō (JCP) 8.3%
