= Fujitani =

Fujitani (written: 藤谷, 富士谷 or 冨士谷) is a Japanese surname. Notable people with the surname include:

- Aiko Fujitani (1902–1965), Japanese religious leader in Hawaii
- Ayako Fujitani (藤谷 文子; born 1979), Japanese writer and actress
- Koshin Fujitani (藤谷 光信; born 1937), Japanese politician
- Miki Fujitani (藤谷 美紀; born 1973), Japanese actress
- Miwako Fujitani (藤谷 美和子; born 1963), Japanese actress
- Fujitani Nariakira (富士谷 成章; 1738–1779), Japanese academic and linguist
- So Fujitani (藤谷 壮; born 1997), Japanese footballer
- Takumi Fujitani (藤谷 匠; born 1995), Japanese footballer
