= 2007 Saitama gubernatorial election =

- 26 August 2007
- Turnout: 27.67% ▼8.13 pp
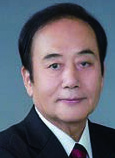
Candidate	Kiyoshi Ueda	Yoshikawa Haruko
Party	Independent	Independent
Popular vote	1,093,480	389,875
Governor before election
Kiyoshi Ueda
Independent
Elected Governor
Kiyoshi Ueda
Independent

The 2007 Saitama Gubernatorial elections were held on August 26, 2007. Incumbent Ueda Kiyoshi was re-elected for a second term, defeating Yoshikawa Haruko.

== Results ==
Gubernatorial election 2007: Saitama Prefecture
Party	Candidate	Votes	%	±%
Independent	Kiyoshi Ueda	1,093,480	70,90 %	▲35,32%
Independent (Supported by JCP)	Yoshikawa Haruko	389,875	25,28 %	N/A
Independent	Takeda Nobuhiro	58,823	3,81 %	N/A
Turnout		1,567,222	27.67 %	▼8,13%
