= Yasue Funayama =

Japanese politician

- 舟山 康江
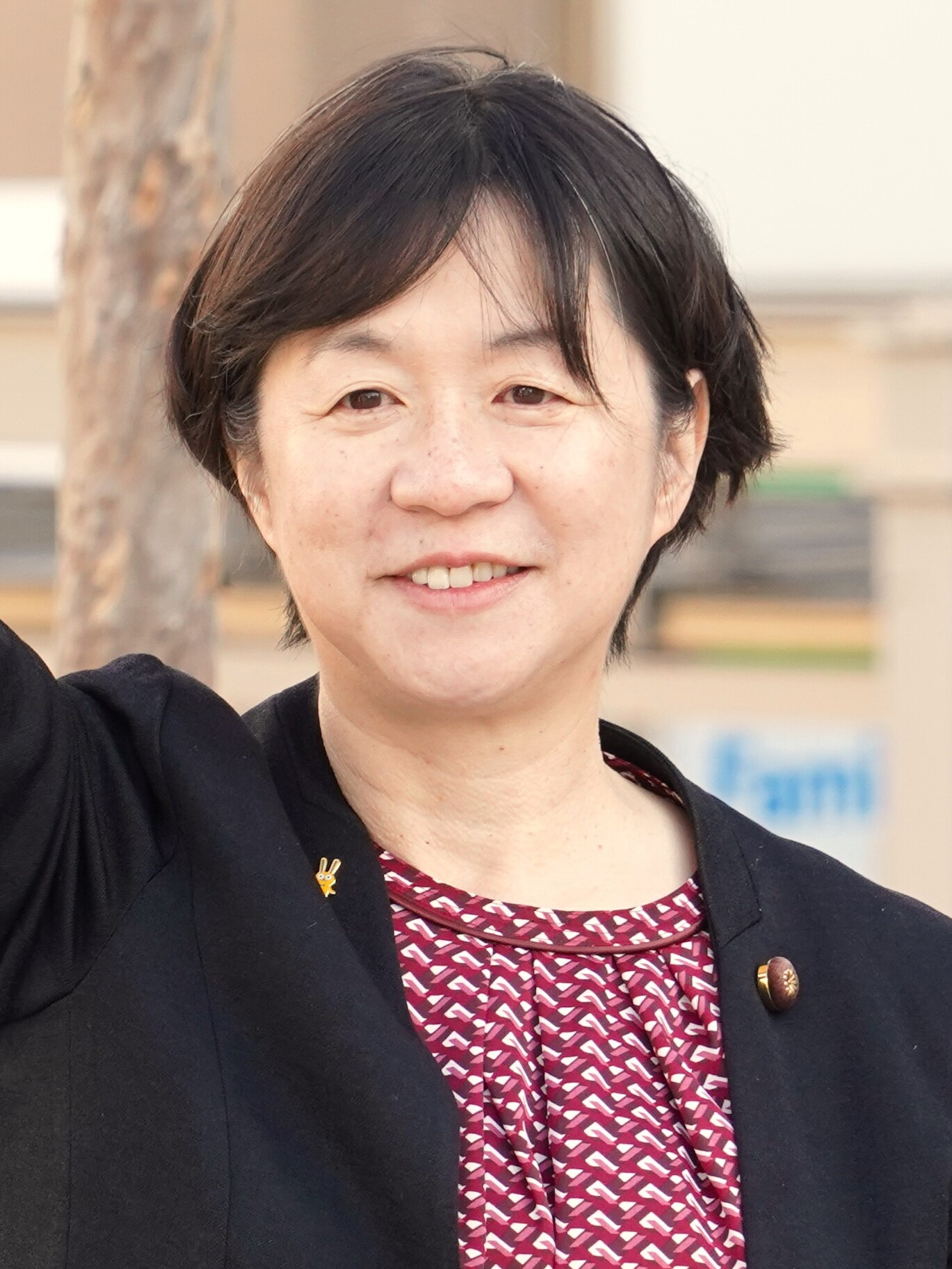
- Funayama in 2025

Member of the House of Councillors
- Incumbent
- Assumed office 26 July 2016
- Preceded by: Koichi Kishi
- Constituency: Yamagata at-large
- In office 29 July 2007 – 28 July 2013
- Preceded by: Masatoshi Abe
- Succeeded by: Mizuho Ōnuma
- Constituency: Yamagata at-large

Personal details
- Born: 26 May 1966 (age 60) Koshigaya, Saitama, Japan
- Party: DPP (since 2020)
- Other political affiliations: Democratic (2007–2012); Green Wind (2012–2013); Independent (2013-2020)
- Education: Hokkaido University

Yasue Funayama (舟山 康江, Funayama Yasue; born May 26, 1966) is a Japanese politician and a member of the House of Councillors (Japan) in the Diet (national legislature).

== Early life ==
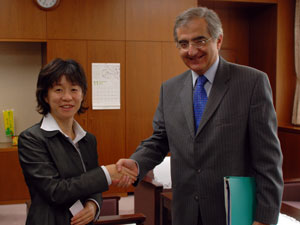
Funayama with Alberto D'Alotto (November 4, 2009)

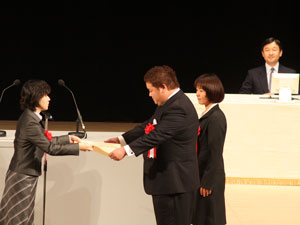
Funayama with Crown Prince Naruhito (November 17, 2009)

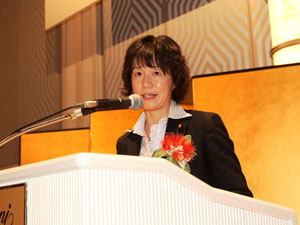
Yasue Funayama (October 27, 2009)

Funayama is a native of Koshigaya, Saitama. She graduated from Hokkaido University.

She worked at the Ministry of Agriculture, Forestry and Fisheries from 1990 until 2000.

== Political career ==
In July 2004 Funayama contested the House of Councillors election as a Democratic Party of Japan (DPJ) candidate in the Yamagata At-large district but lost to the incumbent, Liberal Democratic Party (LDP) member Koichi Kishi.

At the July 2007 election she again contested the Yamagata district as a DPJ candidate and was successful, claiming 57.3% of the vote.

Funayama served as a Parliamentary Secretary for Agriculture, Forestry and Fisheries in the cabinets of prime ministers Yukio Hatoyama and Naoto Kan from September 2009 until September 2010.

In July 2012 Funayama resigned from the DPJ and formed the Green Wind party with three other women Councillors. She sought reelection at the July 2013 election but lost to LDP candidate Mizuho Onuma. Green Wind dissolved at the end of that year.

In December 2015 Funayama announced her intention to contest the 2016 House of Councillors election as an independent.
