= Hirofumi Takinami =

Japanese politician (born 1971)

- 滝波 宏文
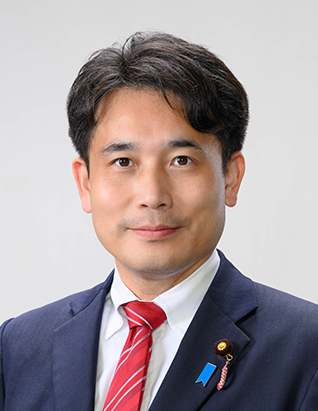
- Official portrait, 2024

Member of the House of Councillors
- Incumbent
- Assumed office 29 July 2013
- Preceded by: Ryuji Matsumura
- Constituency: Fukui at-large

Personal details
- Born: 20 October 1971 (age 54) Fukui Prefecture, Japan
- Party: Liberal Democratic
- Spouse: Shiori Takinami (m. 2002)
- Children: 2
- Education: University of Tokyo; University of Chicago; Waseda University

Hirofumi Takinami (born 20 October 1971) is a Japanese politician who is a member of the House of Councillors of Japan.

== Career ==
Takinami attended the University of Tokyo, graduating in 1994, from the University of Chicago in 1998, and Waseda University in 2021. He had taught at Stanford University from 2009 to 2011.
