= Yamagata at-large district =

Japan House of Councillors constituency

- 山形県選挙区
- Parliamentary constituency for the House of Councillors
- Prefecture: Yamagata
- Electorate: 898,671 (as of September 2022)

Current constituency
- Created: 1947
- Seats: 2
- Councillors: Class of 2028: Yasue Funayama (DPP); Class of 2031: Michiya Haga (Independent)

The Yamagata at-large district (Japanese: 山形県選挙区, Hepburn: Yamagata-ken Senkyoku) is a constituency that represents Yamagata Prefecture in the House of Councillors in the Diet of Japan. Councillors are elected to the house by single non-transferable vote (SNTV) for six-year terms. Since the establishment of the current House of Councillors electoral system in 1947, the district has elected two Councillors, one each at elections held every three years. It has 898,671 registered voters as of September 2022.

== Elected Councillors ==
Class of 1947	Election year	Class of 1950
(1947: 6-year term)	Election year	(1947: 3-year term)
Shigeyasu Kosugi (Ind.)	1947	Rokurōbē Ogata (Ind.)
Shigeyasu Kosugi (Ind.)	1950	Mataji Kobayashi (Socialist)
Saburo Unno (Left Socialist)	1953	Mataji Kobayashi (Socialist)
Saburo Unno (Left Socialist)	1956	Yasusuke Matsuzawa (Socialist) (Note: Died in office 18 June 1959.)
Michio Murayama (LDP)	1959	Yasusuke Matsuzawa (Socialist)
Michio Murayama (LDP)	1959 by-el. (Note: Held 24 July 1959.)	Isami Shirai (LDP)
Michio Murayama (LDP)	1962	Isami Shirai (LDP)
Gorō Itō (LDP)	1965	Isami Shirai (LDP)
Gorō Itō (LDP)	1968	Isami Shirai (LDP)
Gorō Itō (LDP)	1971	Isami Shirai (LDP)
Gorō Itō (LDP)	1974	Tōkichi Abiko (LDP)
Keigi Furuya (LDP)	1977	Tōkichi Abiko (LDP)
Keigi Furuya (LDP)	1980	Tōkichi Abiko (LDP)
Keigi Furuya (LDP)	1983	Tōkichi Abiko (LDP)
Keigi Furuya (LDP)	1986	Teibin Suzuki (LDP)
Yasumatsu Hoshikawa (Rengō no Kai)	1989	Teibin Suzuki (LDP)
Yasumatsu Hoshikawa (Rengō no Kai)	1992	Teibin Suzuki (LDP)
Masatoshi Abe (Ind.)	1995	Teibin Suzuki (LDP)
Masatoshi Abe (Ind.)	1998	Koichi Kishi (LDP)
Masatoshi Abe (LDP)	2001	Koichi Kishi (LDP)
Masatoshi Abe (LDP)	2004	Koichi Kishi (LDP)
Yasue Funayama (DPJ)	2007	Koichi Kishi (LDP)
Yasue Funayama (DPJ)	2010	Koichi Kishi (LDP)
Mizuho Onuma (LDP)	2013	Koichi Kishi (LDP)
Mizuho Onuma (LDP)	2016	Yasue Funayama (Ind.)
Michiya Haga (Ind.)	2019	Yasue Funayama (Ind.)
Michiya Haga (Ind.)	2022	Yasue Funayama (DPP)
Michiya Haga (Ind.)	2025	Yasue Funayama (DPP)

== Election results ==
=== Elections in the 2020s ===
2025: Yamagata at-large 1 seat
Party	Candidate	Votes	%	±%
Independent (CDP)	Michiya Haga (Endorsed by CDP and DPFP)	248,864	46.81	▼3.43 (Note: compared to 2019 result)
LDP	Rika Ōuchi	194,478	36.58	▼7.47
Sanseitō	Tomoaki Satō	66,262	12.46	▲10.37
JCP	Osamu Miidera	17,387	3.27	▼0.32
Anti-NHK	Manabu Ōnuki	4,701	0.88	▼0.43
Turnout			62.55	▲0.68
Registered electors		860,991		
Party total seats		Won	Total	Change
Independent		1	1	Steady
Democratic Party For the People		1	1	Steady

2022: Yamagata at-large 1 seat
Party	Candidate	Votes	%	±%
DPP	Yasue Funayama	269,494	49.0	▼10.05 (compared to 2016 result)
LDP	Rika Ōuchi	242,433	44.0	▼3.3
JCP	Shō Ishikawa	19,767	3.6	
Sanseitō	Akira Kuroki	11,481	2.1	
Anti-NHK	Akira Koizumi	7,217	1.3	▼1.2
Turnout			61.87	▲1.13
Registered electors		899,997		
Party total seats		Won	Total	Change
Independent		1	1	Steady
Democratic Party For the People		1	1	Steady

=== Elections in the 2010s ===
2013
Party	Candidate	Votes	%	±%
LDP	Mizuho Onuma (endorsed by Komeito)	272,779	48.2	
Green Wind	Yasue Funayama (Endorsed by SDP)	252,040	44.6	
JCP	Toshio Ota	33,718	6.0	
Happiness Realization	Ryota Shirotori	7,193	1.3	
Turnout				

2010
Party	Candidate	Votes	%	±%
LDP	Koichi Kishi	263,987	43.6	
Democratic	Yosei Umetsu (Endorsed by People's New Party)	222,942	36.8	
Your	Hiroaki Kawano	88,238	14.6	
JCP	Toshio Ota	30,348	5.0	
Turnout				

=== Elections in the 2000s ===
2007
Party	Candidate	Votes	%	±%
Democratic	Yasue Funayama (Endorsed by People's New Party)	371,071	57.3	
LDP	Mieko Shinohara (Endorsed by Komeito)	238,515	36.8	
JCP	Masayuki Sato	38,008	5.9	
Turnout				
