= Toyama at-large district =

Japan House of Councillors constituency

The Toyama at-large district (Japanese: 富山県選挙区, Hepburn: Toyama-ken senkyoku) is a constituency that represents Toyama Prefecture in the House of Councillors in the Diet of Japan. It has two Councillors in the 242-member house.

== Outline ==
The constituency represents the entire population of Toyama Prefecture. The district elects two Councillors to six-year terms, one at alternating elections held every three years. The district has 888,832 registered voters as of September 2015. The Councillors currently representing Toyama are:

- Kotaro Nogami (Liberal Democratic Party (LDP), second term; term ends in 2016. Previously represented the district from 2001-2007.)
- Shigeru Douko (LDP, first term; term ends in 2019)

== Elected Councillors ==
Class of 1947	election year	Class of 1950 (3-year term in 1947)
Toyokazu Ishizaka (Japan Liberal)	1947	Hisayoshi Ogawa (National Cooperative)
Toyokazu Ishizaka (Japan Liberal)	1950	Saburo Oyama (Note: Died in office 3 October 1951) (Ind.) (Note: Later joined the Liberal Party)
Toyokazu Ishizaka (Japan Liberal)	1951 by-election (Note: Held 16 November 1951)	Tetsuji Tachi (LDP) (Note: First elected in 1951 as an independent.)
Toyokazu Ishizaka (Japan Liberal)	1953	Tetsuji Tachi (LDP)
Toyokazu Ishizaka (Japan Liberal)	1956	Tetsuji Tachi (LDP)
Shiro Sakurai (LDP)	1959	Tetsuji Tachi (LDP)
Shiro Sakurai (LDP)	1962	Tetsuji Tachi (LDP)
Shiro Sakurai (LDP)	1965	Tetsuji Tachi (LDP)
Shiro Sakurai (LDP)	1968	Kazuo Sugihara (Social Democratic)
Naoji Tachibana (LDP)	1971	Kazuo Sugihara (Social Democratic)
Naoji Tachibana (LDP)	1974	Minoru Yoshida (Note: Died in office 16 November 1982) (LDP)
Kimitomo Takahira (LDP)	1977	Minoru Yoshida (LDP)
Kimitomo Takahira (LDP)	1980	Minoru Yoshida (LDP)
Kimitomo Takahira (LDP)	1982 by-election (Note: Held 26 December 1982)	Soto Oki (Note: Died in office 28 June 1987) (LDP)
Kimitomo Takahira (LDP)	1983	Soto Oki (LDP)
Kimitomo Takahira (LDP)	1986	Yoshio Nagata (Note: Yoshio Nagata was elected to a third term in the election held on 12 July 1998 with 47.7% of the vote but died on 22 August. As his death was within three months of the election, Masaaki Tanibayashi, who placed second in the election with 21.1%, was promoted to the seat as of 1 September 1998. The difference of 137,168 votes is said to be the biggest loss be a candidate who was subsequently promoted.) (LDP)
Yasumasa Kakuma (LDP)	1989	Yoshio Nagata (LDP)
Yasumasa Kakuma (LDP)	1992	Yoshio Nagata (LDP)
Yasumasa Kakuma (LDP)	1995	Yoshio Nagata (LDP)
Yasumasa Kakuma (LDP)	1998	Yoshio Nagata (LDP)
Yasumasa Kakuma (LDP)	1998	Masaaki Tanibayashi (DPJ)
Kotaro Nogami (LDP)	2001	Masaaki Tanibayashi (DPJ)
Kotaro Nogami (LDP)	2004	Tsunenori Kawai (LDP)
Takashi Morita (Ind.) (Note: Later joined the People's New Party)	2007	Tsunenori Kawai (LDP)
Takashi Morita (Ind.)	2010	Kotaro Nogami (LDP)
Shigeru Dōko (LDP)	2013	Kotaro Nogami (LDP)

== Election results ==
2013
Party	Candidate	Votes	%	±%
LDP	Shigeru Douko (endorsed by Komeito)	328,638	77.1	
JCP	Wataru Takahashi	51,569	12.1	
Independent	Yoshiteru Nishie	27,509	6.4	
Happiness Realization	Kaoru Yoshida	18,797	4.4	
Turnout				

2010
Party	Candidate	Votes	%	±%
LDP	Kotaro Nogami (former member)	322,739	56.2	
Democratic	Yoshihiko Aimoto	223,691	39.0	
JCP	Wataru Takahashi	27,500	4.8	
Turnout				

2007
Party	Candidate	Votes	%	±%
Independent	Takashi Morita (endorsed by Democratic, Social Democratic and People's New parties)	291,714	50.1	
LDP	Kotaro Nogami (incumbent) (endorsed by Komeito)	265,882	45.7	
JCP	Kazuyuki Izumino	24,240	4.2	
Turnout				

2004
Party	Candidate	Votes	%	±%
LDP	Tsunenori Kawai (endorsed by Komeito)	236,318	46.3	
Democratic	Masaaki Tanibayashi (Incumbent)	190,013	37.2	
Social Democratic	Akira Ogawa	57,486	11.3	
JCP	Toshihito Ueda	26,458	5.2	
Turnout				

== See also ==
- List of districts of the House of Councillors of Japan
