= Koichi Kishi (politician) =

Japanese politician

- 岸 宏一
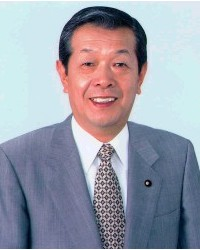
- Official portrait, 2002

Member of the House of Councillors
- In office 26 July 1998 – 25 July 2016
- Preceded by: Teibin Suzuki
- Succeeded by: Yasue Funayama
- Constituency: Yamagata at-large

Mayor of Kaneyama
- In office 1971–1998
- Preceded by: Eiichi Kishi
- Succeeded by: Matsuda Mitsugu

Member of the Kanayama Town Council
- In office 1967–1971

Personal details
- Born: 3 June 1940 Kaneyama, Yamagata, Japan
- Died: 16 October 2017 (aged 77) Chiyoda, Tokyo, Japan
- Party: Liberal Democratic
- Education: Waseda University

Koichi Kishi (岸 宏一, Kishi Kōichi; June 3, 1940 – October 16, 2017) was a Japanese politician of the Liberal Democratic Party, a member of the House of Councillors in the Diet (national legislature). A native of Kaneyama, Yamagata and graduate of Waseda University, he served in the town assembly of Kaneyama from 1967. He then served as mayor of the town for seven terms from 1971 until 1998 when he was elected to the House of Councillors for the first time.
