= Tsunenori Kawai =

Japanese politician (1937–2017)

- 河合 常則
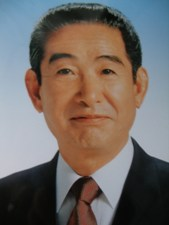

Member of the House of Councillors
- In office 26 July 2004 – 25 July 2010
- Preceded by: Masaaki Tanibayashi
- Succeeded by: Kōtarō Nogami
- Constituency: Toyama at-large

Member of the Toyama Prefectural Assembly
- In office 1975–2004
- Constituency: Higashitonami District

Member of the Jōhana Town Council
- In office 1964–1975

Personal details
- Born: 10 January 1937 Nanto, Toyama, Japan
- Died: 7 September 2017 (aged 80) Nanto, Toyama, Japan
- Party: Liberal Democratic
- Education: Keio University

Tsunenori Kawai (河合 常則, Kawai Tsunenori; January 10, 1937 – September 7, 2017) was a Japanese politician of the Liberal Democratic Party, a member of the House of Councillors in the Diet (national legislature). A native of Jōhana, Toyama and graduate of Keio University, he had served in the town assembly of Jōhana for three terms since 1964 and in the assembly of Toyama Prefecture for eight terms since 1975. He was elected to the House of Councillors for the first time in 2004.
