= Shigeru Dōko =

Japanese politician

- 堂故 茂
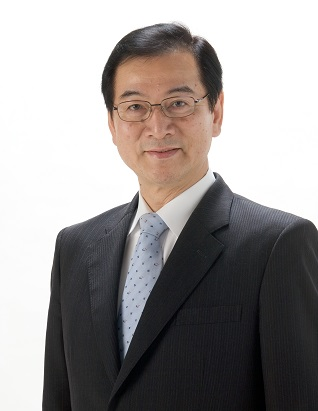
- Official portrait, 2013

Member of the House of Councillors
- In office 29 July 2013 – 28 July 2025
- Preceded by: Takashi Morita
- Succeeded by: Yukie Niwata
- Constituency: Toyama at-large

Mayor of Himi
- In office 7 April 1998 – 1 April 2013
- Preceded by: Shōichirō Nanao
- Succeeded by: Yūjiro Hongawa

Member of the Toyama Prefectural Assembly
- In office 1991–1998
- Constituency: Himi City

Personal details
- Born: 7 August 1952 (age 74) Himi, Toyama, Japan
- Party: Liberal Democratic
- Education: Keio University

Shigeru Dōko is a Japanese politician who is a former member of the House of Councillors of Japan.

== Biography ==
He was elected in 2013 and 2019.
