= Fukui at-large district =

Japan House of Councillors constituency

- 福井県選挙区
- Parliamentary constituency for the House of Councillors
- Prefecture: Fukui
- Electorate: 634,562 (as of September 2022)

Current constituency
- Created: 1947
- Seats: 2
- Councillors: Class of 2019: Hirofumi Takinami (LDP); Class of 2022: Masaaki Yamazaki (LDP)

The Fukui at-large district (Japanese: 福井県選挙区, Hepburn: Fukui-ken senkyoku) is a constituency that represents Fukui Prefecture in the House of Councillors in the Diet of Japan. It has two Councillors in the 248-member house.

== Outline ==
The constituency represents the entire population of Fukui Prefecture. The district elects two Councillors to six-year terms, one at alternating elections held every three years. The district has 644,447 registered voters as of September 2015. Following the merger of the Tottori and Shimane districts into the Tottori-Shimane at-large district and the Tokushima and Kochi districts into the Tokushima-Kochi at-large district in 2015, Fukui became the electorate with the smallest population, thus making it the standard for measuring malapportionment in other districts.

== Elected Councillors ==
Class of 1947	election year	Class of 1950 (3-year term in 1947)
Shichirohei Ikeda (Ind.)	1947	Shojiro Matsushita (Socialist)
Shichirohei Ikeda (Ind.)	1950	Yoshio Domori (Note: Resigned 1 February 1955) (Socialist)
Toshio Sakai (Liberal)	1953	Yoshio Domori (Socialist)
Toshio Sakai (Liberal)	1955 by-election (Note: Held 10 March 1955)	Harukazu Obata (LDP) (Note: First elected in 1955 as an independent.)
Toshio Sakai (Liberal)	1956	Harukazu Obata (LDP)
Mamoru Takahashi (LDP)	1959	Harukazu Obata (LDP)
Mamoru Takahashi (LDP)	1962	Tasaburo Kumagai (LDP)
Mamoru Takahashi (LDP)	1965	Tasaburo Kumagai (LDP)
Mamoru Takahashi (LDP)	1968	Tasaburo Kumagai (LDP)
Kazuhito Tsuji (Socialist)	1971	Tasaburo Kumagai (LDP)
Kazuhito Tsuji (Socialist)	1974	Tasaburo Kumagai (LDP)
Ichiro Yamanouchi (LDP)	1977	Tasaburo Kumagai (LDP)
Ichiro Yamanouchi (LDP)	1980	Tasaburo Kumagai (LDP)
Ichiro Yamanouchi (LDP)	1983	Tasaburo Kumagai (LDP)
Ichiro Yamanouchi (LDP)	1986	Tasaburo Kumagai (Note: Died in office 15 January 1992) (LDP)
Tasaburo Furukawa (Rengō no Kai)	1989	Tasaburo Kumagai (LDP)
Tasaburo Furukawa (Rengō no Kai)	1992	Masaaki Yamazaki (LDP)
Ryuji Matsumura (LDP)	1995	Masaaki Yamazaki (LDP)
Ryuji Matsumura (LDP)	1998	Masaaki Yamazaki (LDP)
Ryuji Matsumura (LDP)	2001	Masaaki Yamazaki (LDP)
Ryuji Matsumura (LDP)	2004	Masaaki Yamazaki (LDP)
Ryuji Matsumura (LDP)	2007	Masaaki Yamazaki (LDP)
Ryuji Matsumura (LDP)	2010	Masaaki Yamazaki (LDP)
Hirofumi Takinami (LDP)	2013	Masaaki Yamazaki (LDP)
Hirofumi Takinami (LDP)	2016	Masaaki Yamazaki (LDP)
Hirofumi Takinami (LDP)	2019	Masaaki Yamazaki (LDP)
Hirofumi Takinami (LDP)	2022	Masaaki Yamazaki (LDP)

== Election results ==
2025
Party	Candidate	Votes	%	±%
Liberal Democratic	Hirofumi Takinami (Incumbent) (endorsed by Komeito)			
Democratic Party For the People	Shunsuke Yamanaka			
Sanseitō	Takahiro Senda			
Constitutional Democratic	Kazue-Chan			
Communist	Kazuo Yamada			
Conservative	Kotaro Osaka			
Anti-NHK	Satoshi Hamada			

2022
Party	Candidate	Votes	%	±%
Liberal Democratic	Masaaki Yamazaki (Incumbent) (endorsed by Komeito)	135,762	39.74	▼26.40
Independent	Takeshi Saiki	122,389	35.82	New
Independent	Kazuhiko Sasaoka (endorsed by Innovation)	31,228	9.14	New
Sanseitō	Mamie Sunahata	26,042	7.62	New
Communist	Kazuo Yamada	17,044	4.99	▼21.19
Anti-NHK	Yoshimoto Daniel	9,203	2.69	▼5.00
Registered electors		635,127		
Turnout			55.32	▲7.68

2019
Party	Candidate	Votes	%	±%
Liberal Democratic	Hirofumi Takinami (Incumbent) (endorsed by Komeito)	195,515	66.14	▲6.02
Communist	Kazuo Yamada	77,377	26.18	▲15.61
Anti-NHK	Masami Shimatani	22,719	7.69	New
Registered electors		646,976		
Turnout			47.64	▼8.86

2016
Party	Candidate	Votes	%	±%
Liberal Democratic	Masaaki Yamazaki (Incumbent) (endorsed by Komeito)	217,304	60.12	▼10.47
Independent	Tatsuhiro Yokoyama	131,278	36.32	New
Happiness Realization	Yasuyuki Shirakawa	12,856	3.56	▲1.48
Registered electors		657,443		
Turnout			56.50	▲2.72

2013
Party	Candidate	Votes	%	±%
Liberal Democratic	Hirofumi Takinami (Incumbent) (endorsed by Komeito)	237,732	70.59	▲19.36
Democratic	Toshikazu Fujino	56,409	16.75	▼25.51
Communist	Kazuo Yamada	35,600	10.57	▲4.06
Happiness Realization	Yasuyuki Shirakawa	7,020	2.08	
Registered electors		648,742		
Turnout			53.78	▼11.48

2010
Party	Candidate	Votes	%	±%
Liberal Democratic	Masaaki Yamazaki (Incumbent)	212,605	51.23	▲3.70
Democratic	Kota Inobe (endorsed by People's New)	175,382	42.26	▼4.54
Communist	Kazuo Yamada	27,017	6.51	▲0.84
Registered electors		653,503		
Turnout			65.26	▲2.01

2007
Party	Candidate	Votes	%	±%
Liberal Democratic	Ryuji Matsumura (Incumbent)	193,617	47.53	▼8.51
Democratic	Seizo Wakaizumi (endorsed by People's New)	190,644	46.80	▲9.05
Communist	Kazuo Yamada	23,110	5.67	▼0.54
Registered electors		656,396		
Turnout			63.25	

2004
Party	Candidate	Votes	%	±%
Liberal Democratic	Masaaki Yamazaki (Incumbent)	218,885	56.04	
Democratic	Makiko Isokawa	147,419	37.75	
JCP	Kunihiro Uno	24,250	6.21	
Registered electors		655,864		
Turnout			61.02	

1955 By-election
Party	Candidate	Votes	%	±%
Independent	Harukazu Obata	191,186	69.4	
Japan Democratic	Akira Hokyo	84,385	30.6	
Turnout			64.32%	

== See also ==
- List of districts of the House of Councillors of Japan
