= So Fujitani =

Japanese footballer (born 1997)

So Fujitani 藤谷 壮
Personal information
- Full name: So Fujitani
- Date of birth: 28 October 1997 (age 29)
- Place of birth: Kobe, Japan
- Height: 1.78 m (5 ft 10 in)
- Position: Defender

Team information
- Current team: Reilac Shiga FC
- Number: 44

Youth career
- 2007–2015: Vissel Kobe

Senior career*
Years	Team	Apps	(Gls)
2015–2020	Vissel Kobe	75	(0)
2020–2022	Giravanz Kitakyushu	48	(0)
2023–2024	Matsumoto Yamaga FC	52	(2)
2025–	Reilac Shiga FC	31	(0)

International career
2017	Japan U-20	2	(0)
Medal record
Representing Japan
AFC U-19 Championship
Gold medal – first place	2016 Bahrain
- * Club domestic league appearances and goals as of 23 August 2026

So Fujitani (藤谷 壮, Fujitani Sō; born 28 October 1997) is a Japanese footballer who plays for Reilac Shiga FC.

His elder brother Takumi is also a professional footballer currently playing for J2 League side Tochigi SC.

== National team career ==
In May 2017, Fujitani was elected Japan U-20 national team for 2017 U-20 World Cup. At this tournament, he played 2 matches as right side back.

== Career statistics ==
Updated to 13 December 2020.

Appearances and goals by club, season and competition
Club	Season	League			Emperor's Cup		J.League Cup		Asia		Other		Total	
Club	Season	Division	Apps	Goals	Apps	Goals	Apps	Goals	Apps	Goals	Apps	Goals	Apps	Goals
Vissel Kobe	2015	J1 League	5	0	2	0	1	0	-		-		8	0
Vissel Kobe	2016	J1 League	0	0	0	0	0	0	-		-		0	0
Vissel Kobe	2017	J1 League	16	0	3	0	4	0	-		-		23	0
Vissel Kobe	2018	J1 League	13	0	0	0	4	0	-		-		17	0
Vissel Kobe	2019	J1 League	7	0	3	0	3	0	-		-		13	0
Vissel Kobe	2020	J1 League	11	0	-		1	0	2	0	0	0	14	0
Career total			52	0	8	0	13	0	2	0	0	0	75	0
