= Takashi Morita =

Japanese politician

- 森田 高
- Official portrait, 2010

Member of the House of Councillors
- In office 29 July 2007 – 28 July 2013
- Preceded by: Kōtarō Nogami
- Succeeded by: Shigeru Dōko
- Constituency: Toyama at-large

Personal details
- Born: 22 July 1967 (age 59) Toyama City, Toyama, Japan
- Party: People's New Party (2008–2013)
- Other political affiliations: Independent (2007–2008)
- Education: University of Tsukuba

Takashi Morita (森田 高, Morita Takashi; born 22 July 1967) is a Japanese politician of People's New Party, an independent and member of the House of Councillors in the Diet (national legislature).

== Career ==
A native of Toyama, Toyama and 1992 graduate of University of Tsukuba, he was elected for the first time in 2007.
