= Ryuji Matsumura =

Japanese politician (1938–2025)

- 松村 龍二
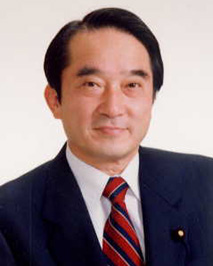
- Official portrait, 2000

Member of the House of Councillors
- In office 23 July 1995 – 28 July 2013
- Preceded by: Tasaburō Furukawa
- Succeeded by: Hirofumi Takinami
- Constituency: Fukui at-large

Personal details
- Born: February 25, 1938 Fukui City, Fukui, Japan
- Died: September 19, 2025 (aged 87) Tokyo, Japan
- Party: Liberal Democratic
- Education: University of Tokyo

Ryuji Matsumura (松村 龍二, Matsumura Ryūji; February 25, 1938 – September 19, 2025) was a Japanese politician of the Liberal Democratic Party, a member of the House of Councillors in the Diet (national legislature).

== Background ==
Matsumura was a native of Fukui, Fukui and a graduate of the University of Tokyo. He joined the National Police Agency in 1961, leaving the agency in 1992 to run for election to the House of Councillors.

Matsumura died at a facility in Tokyo, on September 19, 2025, at the age of 87. He had been living with Parkinson's disease for seven or eight years prior to his death.

== Political career ==
Matsumura was elected to the House of Councillors for the first time in 1995. He served for three terms until his retirement in 2013, when he retired rather than contest the 2013 election.

== Sources ==
- 政治家情報 〜松村 龍二〜. JANJAN (in Japanese).
