= Takumi Fujitani =

Japanese footballer

Personal information
- Date of birth: 6 December 1995 (age 30)
- Place of birth: Hyogo, Japan
- Height: 1.84 m (6 ft 0 in)
- Position: Defender

Team information
- Current team: Fukushima United FC
- Number: 17

Youth career
- –2010: FC Fresca Kobe
- 2011–2013: Kagawa Nishi High School

College career
Years	Team	Apps	(Gls)
2014–2017	Kobe Gakuin University		

Senior career*
Years	Team	Apps	(Gls)
2018–2023	FC Gifu	101	(2)
2024	Tochigi SC	22	(0)
2025–	Fukushima United FC	47	(1)
- * Club domestic league appearances and goals as of 25 August 2026

Takumi Fujitani (藤谷 匠, Fujitani Takumi; born 6 December 1995) is a Japanese professional footballer who plays as a defender for Fukushima United FC.

His younger brother So is also a professional footballer currently playing for J3 League side Matsumoto Yamaga FC.
