= Mieko Kamimoto =

Japanese politician

- 神本 美恵子
- Official portrait, 2011

Member of House of Councillors
- In office 23 July 2001 – 28 July 2019
- Constituency: National PR

Personal details
- Born: 22 January 1948 (age 78) Asakura, Fukuoka, Japan
- Party: CDP (since 2018)
- Other political affiliations: DPJ (2001–2016); DP (2016–2018)
- Education: University of Teacher Education Fukuoka
- Website: Official website

Mieko Kamimoto (神本 美恵子, Kamimoto Mieko; born 22 January 1948) is a Japanese politician of the Constitutional Democratic Party and a member of the House of Councillors in the Diet (national legislature). A native of Asakura District, Fukuoka and graduate of Fukuoka University of Education, she was elected for the first time in 2001.
