= Takao Watanabe =

Japanese politician

- 渡辺 孝男
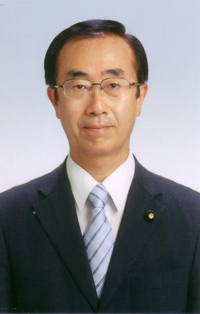
- Official portrait, 2008

Member of the House of Councillors
- In office 23 July 1995 – 28 July 2013
- Constituency: National PR

Personal details
- Born: 1 February 1950 (age 76) Ishioka, Ibaraki, Japan
- Party: Komeito (since 1998)
- Other political affiliations: New Frontier (1995–1998)
- Education: Tohoku University

Takao Watanabe (渡辺 孝男, Watanabe Takao; born 1950) is a Japanese politician of the New Komeito Party, a member of the House of Councillors in the Diet (national legislature). A native of Ishioka, Ibaraki and graduate of Tohoku University, he was elected to the House of Councillors for the first time in 1995.
