= Tomoko Kami =

Japanese politician

- 紙 智子
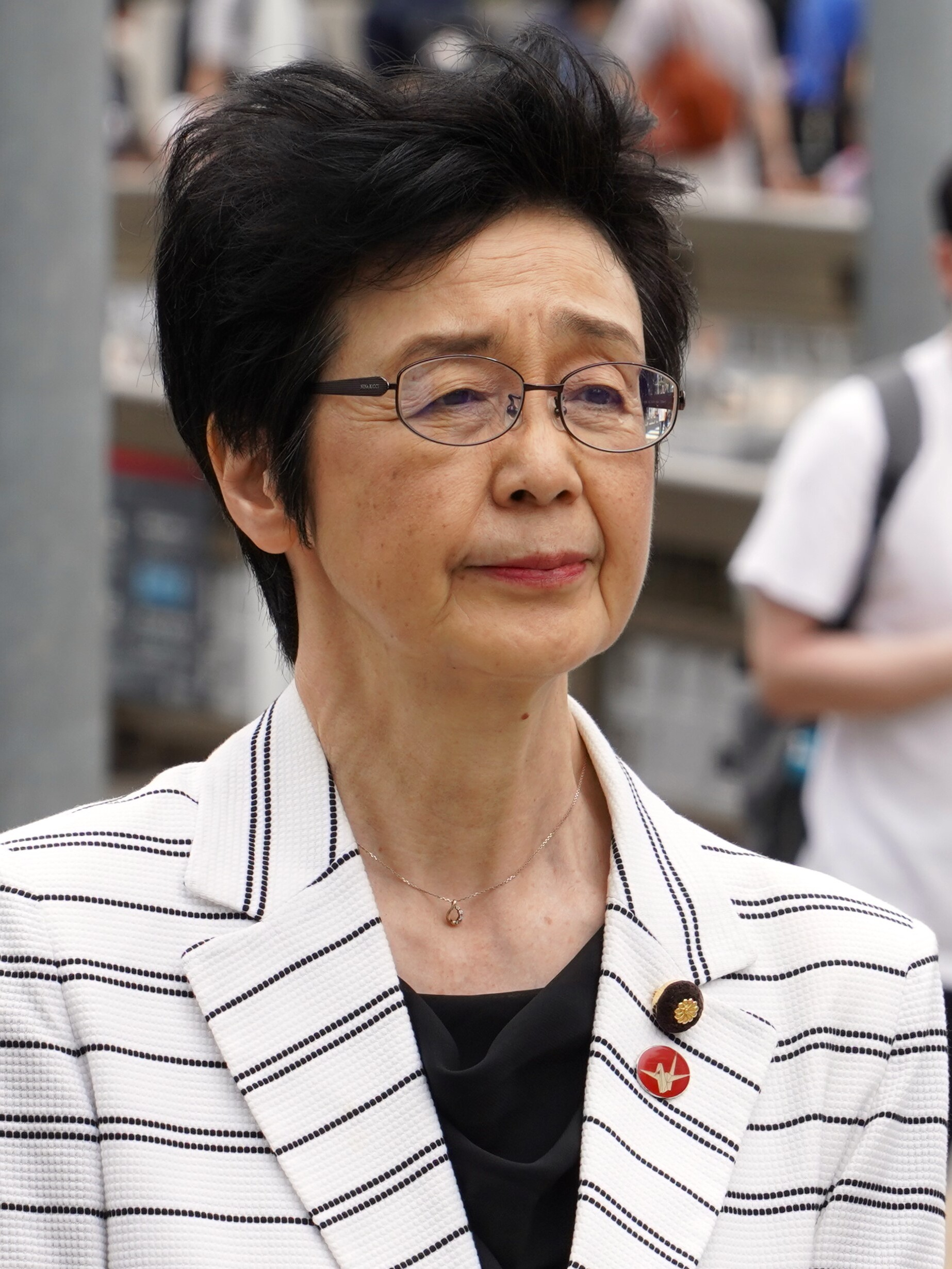
- Kami in 2025

Member of the House of Councillors
- In office 29 July 2001 – 28 July 2025
- Constituency: National PR

Personal details
- Born: 13 January 1955 (age 71) Sapporo, Hokkaido, Japan
- Party: Communist
- Website: www.kami-tomoko.jp

Tomoko Kami (紙 智子, Kami Tomoko), also known as Tomoko Uchiyama (born January 13, 1955), is a Japanese politician and former member of the House of Councillors for the Japanese Communist Party. She first assumed office in the House of Councillors in 2001 and has been elected four times.

A member of the Agriculture, Forestry and Fisheries Committee, Kami is an advocate of policies that support family farming.
