= Shuji Ikeguchi =

Japanese politician (born 1949)

- 池口 修次
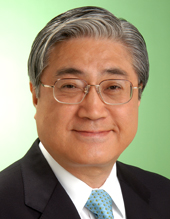

Member of the House of Councillors
- In office 29 July 2001 – 28 July 2013
- Constituency: National PR

Personal details
- Born: 10 November 1949 (age 76) Ōkuwa, Nagano, Japan
- Party: Democratic
- Education: Waseda University

Shuji Ikeguchi (池口 修次, Ikeguchi Shūji; born November 10, 1949) is a Japanese politician of the Democratic Party of Japan, a member of the House of Councillors in the Diet (national legislature). A native of Kiso, Nagano and graduate of Waseda University, he joined Honda in 1972 and was elected to the House of Councillors for the first time in 2001.

== Early life and education ==
Born in Ōkuwa Village, Kiso-gun, Nagano Prefecture, he graduated from Matsumoto Fukashi High School in Nagano Prefecture in 1968, graduated from the Faculty of Science and Engineering at Waseda University in 1972, and joined Honda Motor Co.

== Political career ==
After serving as chairman of the Honda Giken Labor Union, president of the All Honda Federation of Labor, central executive committee member of the Automobile Federation of Japan, and vice president of the Automobile Federation of Japan, he ran in the 19th ordinary election for the House of Councilors in 2001 from the proportional district, officially recognized by the Democratic Party of Japan, and won his first election.

In 2007, he became Chairman of the Special Committee on the Establishment of Political Ethics and the Election System, succeeding Hiroshi Suzuki, who resigned due to ill health.

In September 2010, he was appointed as Vice Minister of Land, Infrastructure, Transport and Tourism (in charge of disaster countermeasures, national land planning, and social infrastructure development excluding cities and rivers) in the first reshuffled cabinet of Naoto Kan, and served until the second reshuffled cabinet of Naoto Kan.

In June 2012, he succeeded Yuichiro Haneda, who became Minister of Land, Infrastructure, Transport, and Tourism, as Chairman of the Diet Committee of the House of Councillors.

He did not run in the 23rd regular House of Councillors election in 2013, but the Federation of Automobile Manufacturers' Associations (FOMA) nominated Tetsushi Isozaki as his successor and elected him to the post.
