= Koshin Fujitani =

Japanese politician (born 1937)

- 藤谷 光信

Member of the House of Councillors
- In office 29 July 2007 – 28 July 2013
- Constituency: National PR

Member of the Yamaguchi Prefectural Assembly
- In office 1991–2007
- Constituency: Iwakuni City

Member of the Iwakuni City Council
- In office 1975–1991

Personal details
- Born: 1 January 1937 (age 89) Iwakuni, Yamaguchi, Japan
- Party: CDP (since 2020)
- Other political affiliations: DPJ (2007–2016); DP (2016–2018); DPP (2018–2020)
- Education: Ryukoku University

Koshin Fujitani (藤谷 光信, Fujitani Kōshin; born January 1, 1937) is a Japanese politician of the Democratic Party of Japan, a member of the House of Councillors in the Diet (national legislature). A former member of the assembly of Yamaguchi Prefecture, he was elected to the House of Councillors for the first time in 2007.

Fujitani is also an ordained Shin Buddhist priest within Honganji-ha.
