= Kōtarō Nogami =

Japanese politician

- 野上 浩太郎
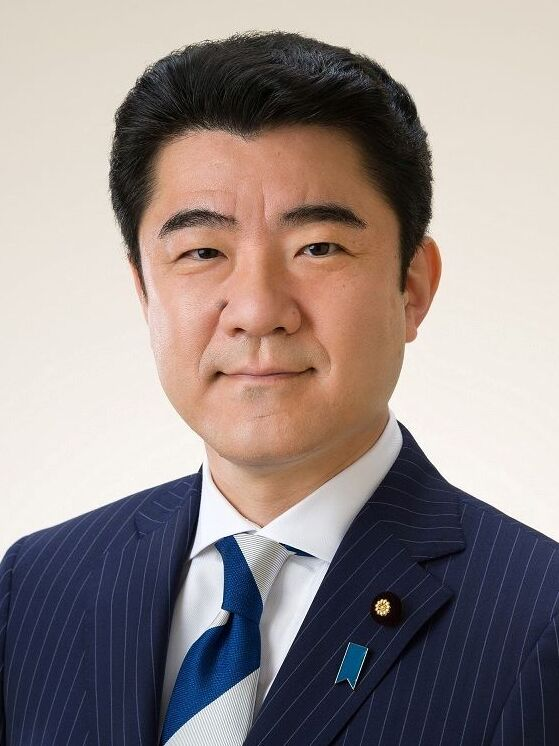
- Official portrait, 2015

Minister of Agriculture, Forestry and Fisheries
- In office 16 September 2020 – 4 October 2021
- Prime Minister: Yoshihide Suga
- Preceded by: Taku Etō
- Succeeded by: Genjirō Kaneko

Deputy Chief Cabinet Secretary (Political affairs, House of Councillors)
- In office 3 August 2016 – 11 September 2019
- Prime Minister: Shinzo Abe
- Preceded by: Hiroshige Seko
- Succeeded by: Naoki Okada

Member of the House of Councillors
- Incumbent
- Assumed office 26 July 2010
- Preceded by: Tsunenori Kawai
- Constituency: Toyama at-large
- In office 29 July 2001 – 28 July 2007
- Preceded by: Yasumasa Kakuma
- Succeeded by: Takashi Morita
- Constituency: Toyama at-large

Member of the Toyama Prefectural Assembly
- In office 1999–2001
- Constituency: Toyama City

Personal details
- Born: 20 May 1967 (age 59) Toyama, Japan
- Party: Liberal Democratic
- Education: Keio University

Kōtarō Nogami (born 20 May 1967) is a Japanese politician who served as the Minister of Agriculture, Forestry and Fisheries from September 2020 to October 2021. He previously served as Deputy Chief Cabinet Secretary from 2016 to 2019, and is also a member of the House of Councilors of Japan, winning his first election in 2001.

Nogami served in the House of Councilors for Toyama from 2001 to 2007, serving one term. After losing re-election, he ran again in 2010 and successfully won the seat. In 2013, he was named State Minister of Land, Infrastructure, Transport and Tourism, and served in that position for a year. In 2016, Prime Minister Shinzo Abe appointed him as Deputy Chief Cabinet Secretary, and he served in that position until 2019.
