= Masashi Fujiwara =

Japanese politician (1946–2018)

- 藤原 正司

Member of the House of Councillors
- In office 29 July 2001 – 28 July 2013
- Constituency: National PR

Personal details
- Born: 1 April 1946 Kanzaki, Hyōgo, Japan
- Died: 15 September 2018 (aged 72) Kobe, Hyōgo, Japan
- Party: Democratic

Masashi Fujiwara (藤原 正司, Fujiwara Masashi; April 1, 1946 – September 15, 2018) was a Japanese politician who was a member of the Democratic Party of Japan. He was a member of the House of Councillors in the Diet (national legislature). A native of Kanzaki, Hyōgo and high school graduate, he was elected for the first time in 2001.

Fujiwara died of liver cancer on September 15, 2018.
