= Masatoshi Abe =

Japanese politician (1942-2020)

- 阿部 正俊
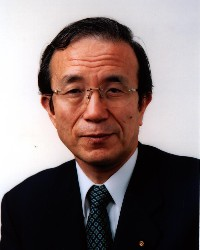
- Official portrait, 2003

Member of the House of Councillors
- In office 23 July 1995 – 28 July 2007
- Preceded by: Yasumatsu Hoshikawa
- Succeeded by: Yasue Funayama
- Constituency: Yamagata at-large

Personal details
- Born: 4 November 1942 Kitamurayama, Yamagata, Japan
- Died: 25 October 2020 (aged 77) Tokyo, Japan
- Party: Liberal Democratic
- Education: Tohoku University
- Awards: Order of the Rising Sun

Masatoshi Abe (阿部 正俊, Abe Masatoshi; 4 November 1942 – 25 October 2020) was a Japanese politician who was a member of the Diet of Japan. He served as Senior Vice-Minister for Foreign Affairs under the government of Junichiro Koizumi.

Abe was a native of Higashine, Yamagata Prefecture and graduated from Tohoku University.

Abe died on 25 October 2020, at the age of 77.
