= Shuichi Kato (politician) =

Japanese politician

- 加藤 修一
- Official portrait, 2003

Member of the House of Councillors
- In office 23 July 1995 – 28 July 2013
- Constituency: National PR

Personal details
- Born: 28 September 1947 (age 79) Tanno, Hokkaido, Japan
- Party: Komeito
- Other political affiliations: New Frontier (1995–1998)
- Education: Kitami Institute of Technology
- Alma mater: Hokkaido University

Shuichi Kato (加藤 修一, Katō Shūichi; born 28 September 1947) is a Japanese politician of the New Komeito Party, a member of the House of Councillors in the Diet (national legislature).

== Early life ==
Kato is a native of Tanno, Hokkaidō, and graduated from the Kitami Institute of Technology. He received a Ph.D. from Hokkaido University.

== Political career ==
Kato was elected to the House of Councillors for the first time in 1995 as a member of the New Frontier Party.

He has served as the Deputy Minister of the Environment and Deputy Secretary General of the Komeito Party.

He served as a member of the House of Councillors until 2013.
