= Haruko Yoshikawa =

Japanese politician (born 1940)

- 吉川 春子

Member of the House of Councillors
- In office 9 July 1983 – 22 July 2007
- Preceded by: Constituency established
- Succeeded by: Multi-member district
- Constituency: National PR

Member of the Yashio City Council
- In office 1973–1976

Personal details
- Born: 26 November 1940 (age 85) Tokyo, Japan
- Party: Communist
- Education: Chuo University
- Website: haruko.gr.jp

Haruko Yoshikawa (吉川 春子, Yoshikawa Haruko; born November 26, 1940) is a Japanese politician and former member of the House of Councillors for the Japanese Communist Party.
