= JANJAN =

Japanese online newspaper (defunct)

JANJAN (Japanese: ジャンジャン), short for Japan Alternative News for Justices and New Cultures (Japanese: さまざまな正義と新しい文化のために日本から発信するもう一つのニュース), was a Japanese online newspaper started by Ken Takeuchi, journalist and former mayor of Kamakura, Kanagawa. Launched in February 2003, the newspaper is credited for pioneering citizen journalism in Japan. After registration, anyone was free to post comments on the JANJAN website. However, there were different windows for registering depending on the nationality or ethnicity of the potential poster (i.e. a different one for "Foreigners" (外国の方) and Japanese).

The bulk of the newspaper's revenue came from advertisements by its corporate sponsor. Due a lack of revenue, the newspaper ceased publication at the end of March 2010. In May of the same year, it was replaced by a journalistic blog named JanJanBlog, which was operated until 31 December 2013. As of February 2014, articles on both the newspaper and blog are no longer available.
