= Yasuhiro Oe =

Japanese politician

- 大江 康弘
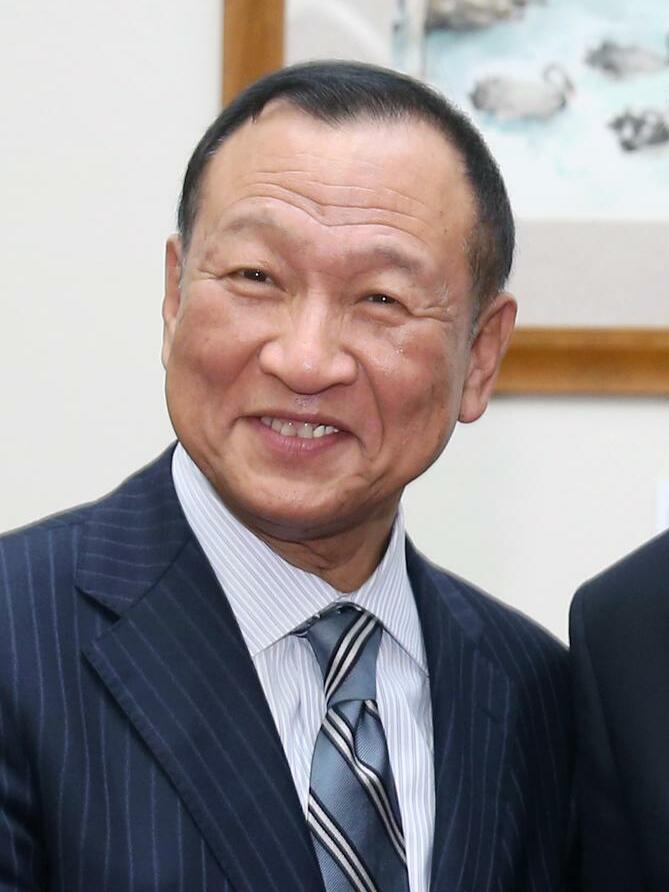
- Oe in 2016

Mayor of Shirahama
- Incumbent
- Assumed office 13 May 2024
- Preceded by: Makoto Itani

Member of the House of Councillors
- In office 29 July 2001 – 22 May 2013
- Preceded by: Multi-member district
- Succeeded by: Terutsugu Yamamura
- Constituency: National PR

Member of the Wakayama Prefectural Assembly
- In office 1979–2000
- Constituency: Wakayama City

Personal details
- Born: 4 December 1953 (age 72) Shirahama, Wakayama, Japan
- Party: Independent (1998–2001; 2010–2011; 2018–present)
- Other political affiliations: LDP (1979–1993; 2013–2018); JRP (1993–1994); NFP (1994–1998); LP (2001–2003); DPJ (2003–2008); JRP (2008–2010); HRP (2010)
- Education: Ashiya University

Yasuhiro Oe (大江 康弘, Ōe Yasuhiro; born December 4, 1950) is a Japanese politician of the Liberal Democratic Party, a member of the House of Councillors in the Diet (national legislature).

== Early life ==
Oe is a native of Tanabe, Wakayama. He graduated from Ashiya University and the Western Australia Institute of Technology.

== Political career ==
From 1979 Oe served in the assembly of Wakayama Prefecture for six terms.

After running unsuccessfully for governorship of Wakayama Prefecture in 2000, he was elected to the House of Councillors for the first time in 2001.

In May 2010, he joined the Happiness Realization Party, giving that group its first national political representative. He left the party six months later, and is currently a member of the Liberal Democratic Party.

== Right-wing positions ==
He was a supporter of right-wing filmmaker Satoru Mizushima's 2007 revisionist film The Truth About Nanjing, which denied that the Nanjing Massacre ever occurred.
