= Results of the 2022 Japanese House of Councillors election by FPTP =

- 10 July 2022

32 of the 64 FPTP seats in the House of Councillors
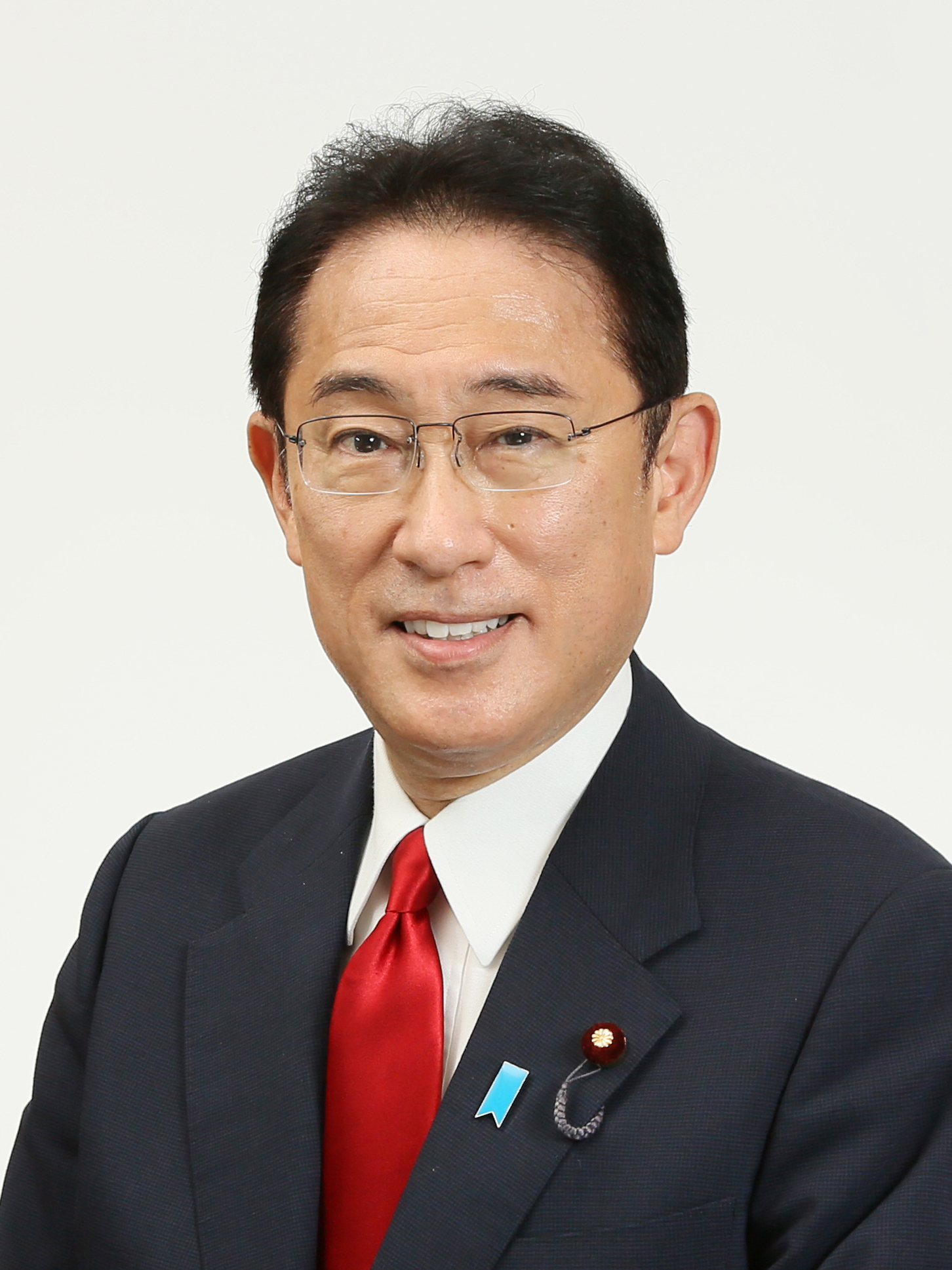

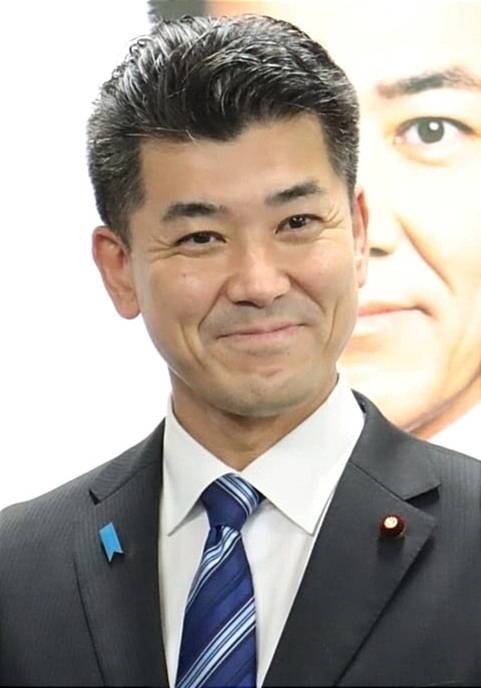

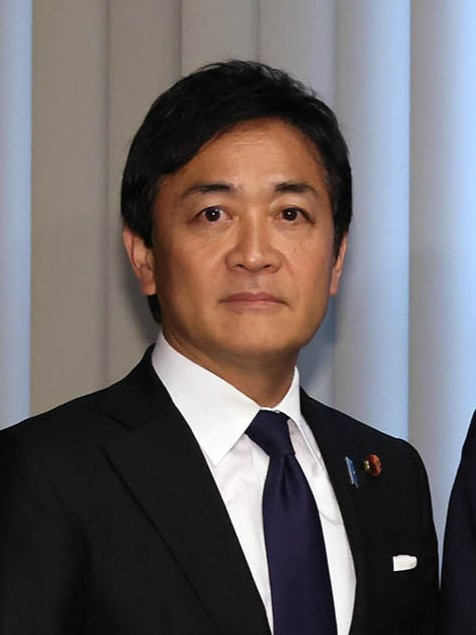
	First party	Second party	Third party
Leader	Fumio Kishida	Kenta Izumi	Yuichiro Tamaki
Party	LDP	CDP	DPP
Last election	43 seats	Did not exist	Did not exist
Seats won	28	2	1
Seats after	50	6	1
Seat change	▲7	New	New
	Fourth party
Party	Independent
Last election	10 seats
Seats won	1
Seats after	7
Seat change	▼3

In July 2022, an election was held in Japan to re-elect thirty-two of the sixty-four single-seat constituencies in the House of Councillors.

In the 2016 election, the result of the single-seat constituency seats was the victory of the Liberal Democratic Party with 36 seats, while the opposition parties won 32 seats. Then, in 2019, the LDP, while losing 7 seats in total, arrived at 36 seats by constituency. The opposition, though gaining seats at the national level, lost 11 seats in the constituency.

In this election, the coordination of candidates between opposition parties was not successful, and some districts were crowded with opposition candidates. As a result, the largest opposition party nationally, the Japan Innovation Party, won just 4 seats by constituency, while the LDP gained a landslide victory with 45 seats by constituency, 7 more than in the previous election.

The LDP was victorious in the Iwate at-large district for the first time in 30 years.

== Closest races ==
State	Party of winner	Margin
Okinawa	Indep.	0.49%
Fukui	LDP	3.92%
Iwate	LDP (flip)	3.97%
Yamagata	DPP	4.91%
Yamanashi	LDP (flip)	5.17%
Nagano	CDP	5.88%
Niigata	LDP (flip)	6.78%
Akita	LDP	7.01%
Ōita	LDP (flip)	9.21%

== Akita at-large district ==
Akita at-large district election
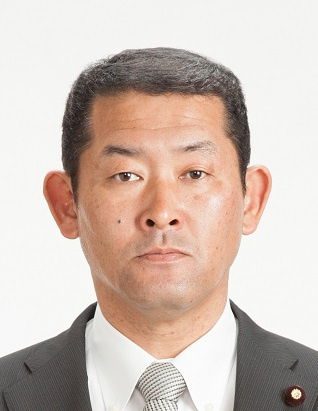

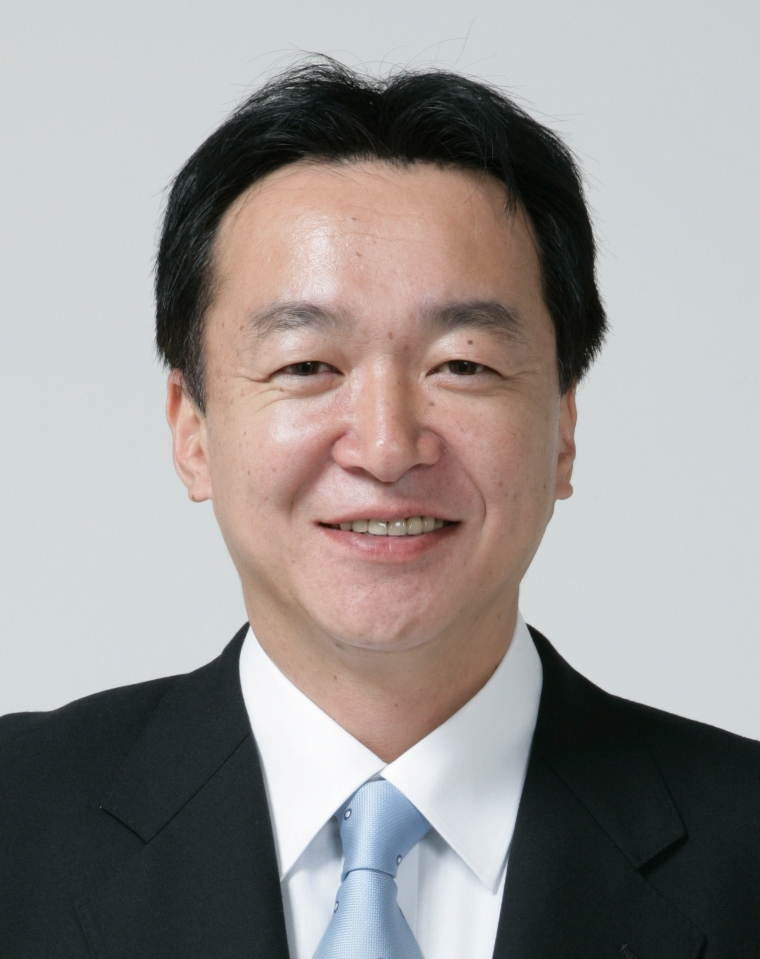

Nominee	Hiroo Ishii	Toshihide Muraoka	Yuriko Sasa
Party	LDP	Independent	Independent
Popular vote	194,949	162,889	62,415
Percentage	42.66%	35.65%	13.66%
Supported by	Komeito	DPP	CDP
Councillor before election
Hiroo Ishii
LDP
Elected Councillor
Hiroo Ishii
LDP

=== Candidates ===
Name	Age	Party	Current Positions
Hiroo Ishii	58	LDP	Member of the House of Councillors (2010-present); Previous offices held: Baseball player
Toshihide Muraoka	61	Independent	None Previous offices held: Member of the House of Representatives (2012–2017)
Yuriko Sasa	46	Independent	Patent attorney; Chief representative of the Nonprofit organization
Yūri Fujimoto	43	JCP	Standing member of the JCP's Akita Committee
Mamiko Ito	51	Sanseitō	Executive of the company
Yukihisa Honda	40	Anti-NHK	Care worker

=== Result ===
Akita at-large district election
Party	Candidate	Votes	%	±%
LDP	Hiroo Ishii	194,949	42.66%	
Independent	Toshihide Muraoka	162,889	35.65%	New
Independent	Yuriko Sasa	62,415	13.66%	New
JCP	Yūri Fujimoto	19,983	4.37%	N/A
Sanseitō	Mamiko Ito	10,329	2.26%	New
Anti-NHK	Yukihisa Honda	6,368	1.39%	N/A
Total votes		456,933	100.0%	
LDP hold				

== Aomori at-large district ==
Aomori at-large district election
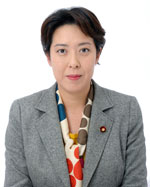

Nominee	Masayo Tanabu	Naohito Saito
Party	CDP	LDP
Popular vote	277,009	216,265
Percentage	53.45%	41.73%
Supported by	SDP	Komeito
Councillor before election
Masayo Tanabu
CDP
Elected Councillor
Masayo Tanabu
CDP

=== Candidates ===
Name	Age	Party	Current Positions
Masayo Tanabu	53	CDP	Member of the House of Councillors (2016-present); Previous offices held: Member of the House of Representatives (2003, 2005–2012)
Naohito Saito	47	LDP	None Previous offices held: Sumo Wrestler; Member of the Itayanagi town Council (2012–2014); Member of the Aomori Prefectural Assembly (2014–2022)
Eitaro Chujo	53	Sanseitō	President of the real estate company
Akira Sasaki	50	Anti-NHK	Self-employment

=== Result ===
Aomori at-large district election
Party	Candidate	Votes	%	±%
CDP	Masayo Tanabu	277,009	53.45%	N/A
LDP	Naohito Saito	216,265	41.73%	
Sanseitō	Eitaro Chujo	13,607	2.63%	New
Anti-NHK	Akira Sasaki	11,335	2.19%	N/A
Total votes		518,216	100.0%	
CDP hold				

== Ehime at-large district ==
Ehime at-large district election
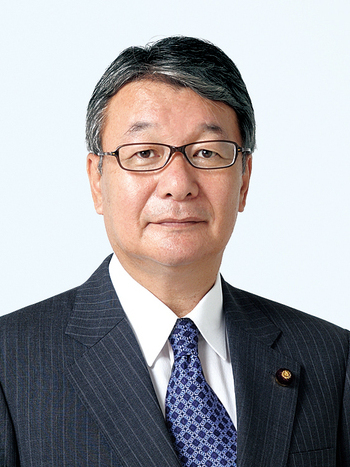

Nominee	Junzo Yamamoto	Chika Takami
Party	LDP	Independent
Popular vote	318,846	173,229
Percentage	59.04%	32.08%
Supported by	Komeito	CDP
Councillor before election
Junzo Yamamoto
LDP
Elected Councillor
Junzo Yamamoto
LDP

=== Candidates ===
Name	Age	Party	Current Positions
Junzo Yamamoto	67	LDP	Member of the House of Councillors (2004-present); Previous offices held: Member of Ehime Prefectural Assembly (1983–2004); State Minister of Land, Infrastructure, Transport and Tourism (2015–2016); State Minister of Cabinet Office (2015–2016); State Minister for Reconstruction (2015–2016); Chairperson of the National Public Safety Commission (2018–2019); Minister of State for Disaster Management (2018–2019)
Chika Takami	60	Independent	None Previous offices held: Talent
Kuniyasu Yagi	56	Sanseitō	None Previous offices held: Professional football coach; Lecturer at Tsukuba University
Hironori Yoshihara	36	Anti-NHK	None Previous offices held: Japanese Ground Self-Defense Force official; Kaitenzushi restaurant manager
Takashi Matsugi	42	Japan First	Cleaning company employee

=== Result ===
Ehime at-large district election
Party	Candidate	Votes	%	±%
LDP	Junzo Yamamoto	318,846	59.04%	
Independent	Chika Takami	173,229	32.08%	New
Sanseitō	Kuniyasu Yagi	27,912	5.17%	New
Anti-NHK	Hironori Yoshihara	12,714	2.35%	N/A
Japan First	Takashi Matsugi	7,350	1.36%	N/A
Total votes		540,051	100.0%	
LDP hold				

== Fukui at-large district ==
Fukui at-large district election
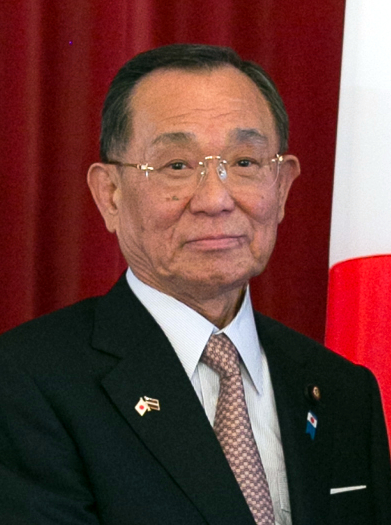

Nominee	Masaaki Yamazaki	Takeshi Saiki	Kazuhiko Sasaoka
Party	LDP	Independent	Independent
Popular vote	135,762	122,389	31,228
Percentage	39.74%	35.82%	9.14%
Supported by	Komeito		Ishin
Councillor before election
Masaaki Yamazaki
LDP
Elected Councillor
Masaaki Yamazaki
LDP

=== Candidates ===
Name	Age	Party	Current Positions
Masaaki Yamazaki	80	LDP	Member of the House of Councillors (1992-present); Previous offices held: Member of Ōno City Council (1975–1979); Member of Fukui Prefectural Assembly (1979–1992); Speaker of the Fukui Prefectural Assembly (1991–1992); Deputy Chief Cabinet Secretary (2003–2005); Vice President of the House of Councillors (2012–2013); President of the House of Councillors (2013–2016)
Takeshi Saiki	48	Independent	None Previous offices held: NHK announcer; Member of the House of Representatives (2009-2012, 2017–2021)
Kazuhiko Sasaoka	66	Independent	None Previous offices held: President of a construction materials company; Member of the Fukui Prefectural Assembly (2003–2022)
Kazuo Yamada	54	JCP	Standing Member of the JCP Fukui Prefectural Committee
Mamie Sunahata	40	Sanseitō	None
Yoshimito Daniel	42	Anti-NHK	None Previous offices held: Member of the Ōno City Council (2019–2022)

=== Result ===
Fukui at-large district election
Party	Candidate	Votes	%	±%
LDP	Masaaki Yamazaki	135,762	39.74%	
Independent	Takeshi Saiki	122,389	35.82%	New
Independent	Kazuhiko Sasaoka	31,228	9.14%	New
Sanseitō	Mamie Sunahata	26,042	7.62%	New
JCP	Kazuo Yamada	17,044	4.99%	N/A
Anti-NHK	Yoshimoto Daniel	9,203	2.69%	N/A
Total votes		341,668	100.0%	
LDP hold				

== Fukushima at-large district ==
Fukushima at-large district election
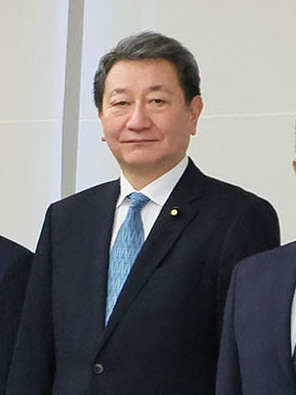

Nominee	Hokuto Hoshi	Akiko Onodera
Party	LDP	Independent
Popular vote	419,701	320,151
Percentage	51.58%	39.35%
Supported by	Komeito	CDP, DPP, SDP
Councillor before election
Teruhiko Mashiko
Independent
Elected Councillor
Hokuto Hoshi
LDP

=== Candidates ===
Name	Age	Party	Current Positions
Hokuto Hoshi	58	LDP	Doctor; Previous offices held: Vice Chair of the Fukushima Medical Association
Akiko Onodera	43	Independent	Announcer; Previous offices held: FM Fukushima announcer
Sanae Sato	62	Independent	None Previous offices held: Elementary school nurse
Sawako Kuboyama	47	Sanseitō	Company President
Makiko Minagawa	52	Anti-NHK	None Previous offices held: Member of the Yonezawa City Council (2015–2019)

=== Result ===
Fukushima at-large district election
Party	Candidate	Votes	%	±%
LDP	Hokuto Hoshi	419,701	51.58%	
Independent	Akiko Onodera	320,151	39.35%	New
Independent	Sanae Sato	30,913	3.80%	New
Sanseitō	Sawako Kuboyama	23,027	2.83%	New
Anti-NHK	Makiko Minagawa	19,829	2.44%	N/A
Total votes		813,621	100.0%	
LDP gain from Independent				

== Gifu at-large district ==
Gifu at-large district election
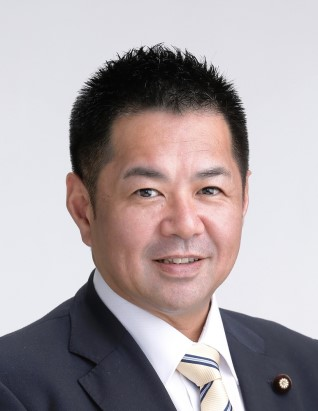

Nominee	Takeyuki Watanabe	Midori Tanno
Party	LDP	DPP
Popular vote	452,085	257,852
Percentage	52.81%	30.12%
Supported by	Komeito
Councillor before election
Takeyuki Watanabe
LDP
Elected Councillor
Takeyuki Watanabe
LDP

=== Candidates ===
Name	Age	Party	Current Positions
Takeyuki Watanabe	54	LDP	Member of the House of Councillors (2010-present); State Minister of Land, Infrastructure, Transport and Tourism (2021-present); Previous offices held: Member of the Gifu Prefectural Assembly (1995-1998, 1999–2010)
Midori Tanno	49	DPP	Deputy leader of the DPP Gifu Confederation; Previous offices held: CBC television announcer
Keiji Mio	45	JCP	Standing Member of the JCP Seinō Area Committee; Previous offices held: Chemical wholesaler
Megumi Hiroe	43	Sanseitō	Hairdresser
Masahiko Sakamoto	50	Anti-NHK	Writer; Secretary of the Member of the House of Councillors

=== Result ===
Gifu at-large district election
Party	Candidate	Votes	%	±%
LDP	Takeyuki Watanabe	452,085	52.81%	
DPP	Midori Tanno	257,852	30.12%	N/A
JCP	Keiji Mio	74,072	8.65%	N/A
Sanseitō	Megumi Hiroe	49,350	5.77%	New
Anti-NHK	Masahiko Sakamoto	22,648	2.65%	N/A
Total votes		856,007	100.0%	
LDP hold				

== Gunma at-large district ==
Gunma at-large district election
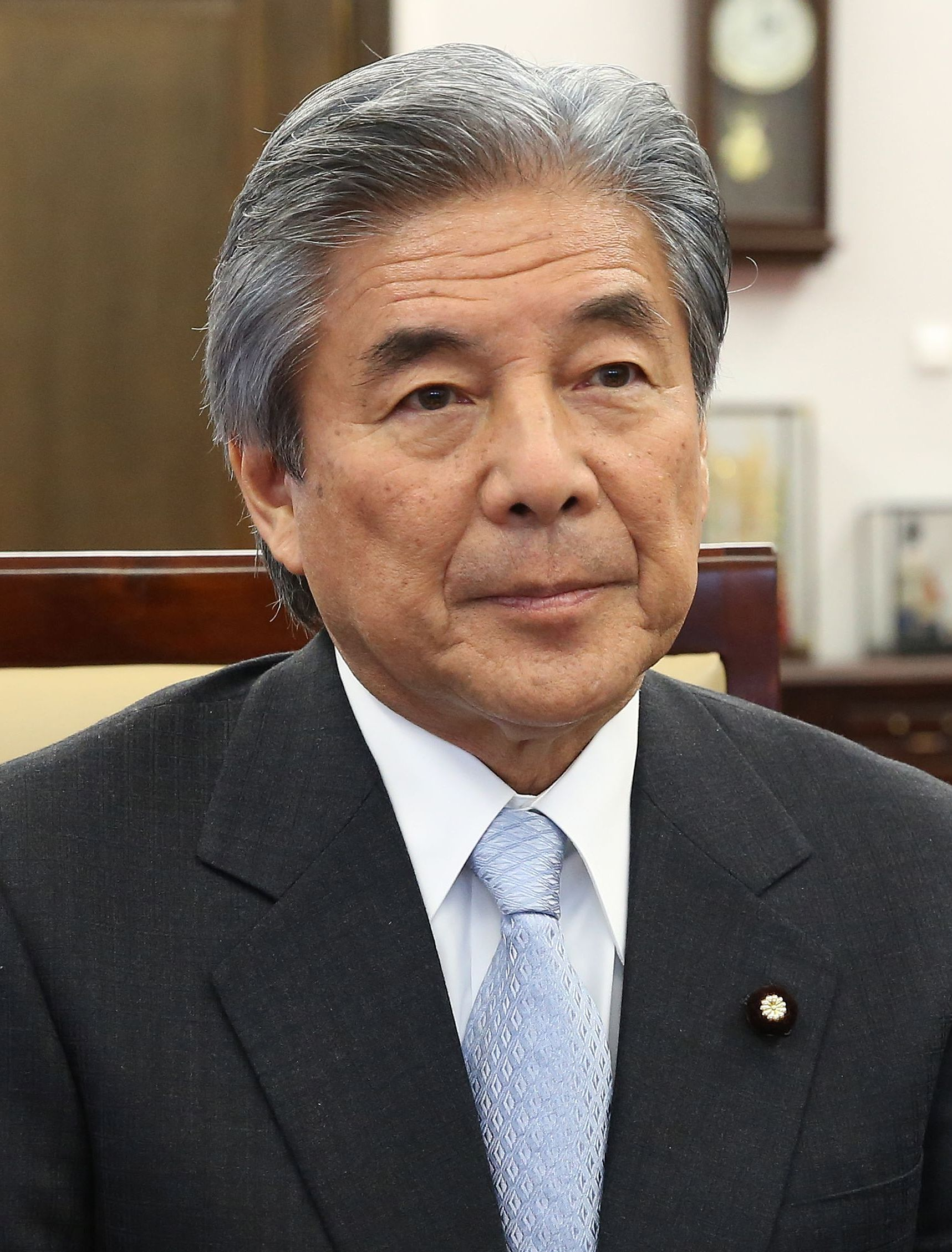

Nominee	Hirofumi Nakasone	Keiko Shirai
Party	LDP	Independent
Popular vote	476,017	138,429
Percentage	63.83%	18.56%
Supported by	Komeito	CDP, DPP
Councillor before election
Hirofumi Nakasone
LDP
Elected Councillor
Hirofumi Nakasone
LDP

=== Candidates ===
Name	Age	Party	Current Positions
Hirofumi Nakasone	76	LDP	Member of the House of Councillors (1986-present); Previous offices held: Minister of Education, Science, Sports and Culture (1999–2000); Special Advisor to the Prime Minister of Japan (2000–2001); Minister for Foreign Affairs (2008–2009)
Keiko Shirai	60	Independent	Vice Secretary-General of RENGO Gunma; Previous offices held: Nurse
Tamotsu Takahashi	64	JCP	Chair of the Life and Employment Policy Office of the JCP Gunma; Previous offices held: Elementary School teacher
Tetsuro Niikura	43	Sanseitō	Chief Executive Officer of a Training Company; Previous offices held: Fighter
Tadafumi Kojima	46	Anti-NHK	Leader of the Political Organization; Shipping Company employee

=== Result ===
Gunma at-large district election
Party	Candidate	Votes	%	±%
LDP	Hirofumi Nakasone	476,017	63.83%	
Independent	Keiko Shirai	138,429	18.56%	New
JCP	Tamotsu Takahashi	69,490	9.32%	N/A
Sanseitō	Tetsuro Niikura	39,523	5.30%	New
Anti-NHK	Tadafumi Kojima	22,276	2.99%	N/A
Total votes		745,735	100.0%	
LDP hold				

== Ishikawa at-large district ==
Ishikawa at-large district election
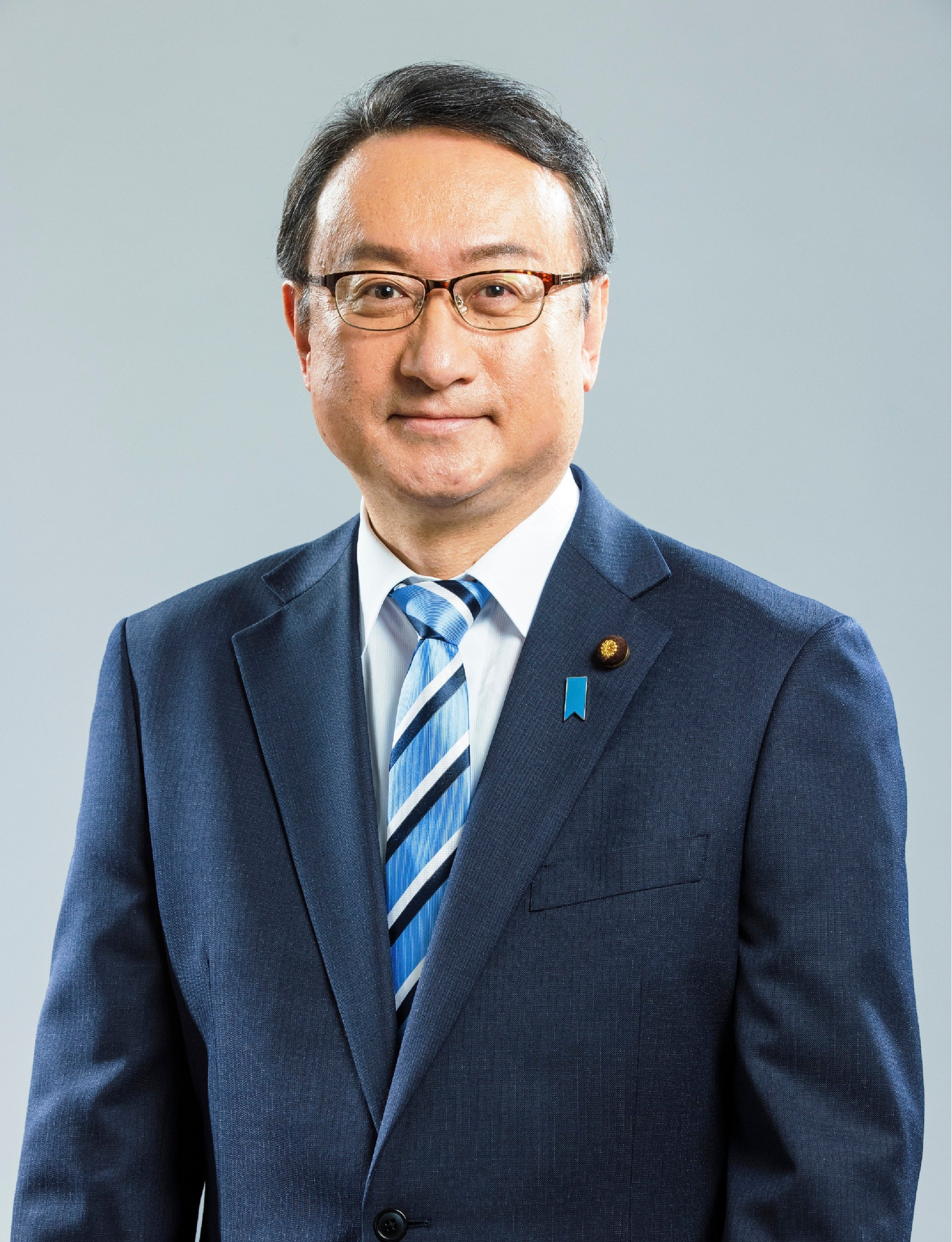

Nominee	Naoki Okada	Tsuneko Oyamada
Party	LDP	CDP
Popular vote	274,253	83,766
Percentage	64.53%	19.71%
Supported by	Komeito	SDP
Councillor before election
Naoki Okada
LDP
Elected Councillor
Naoki Okada
LDP

=== Candidates ===
Name	Age	Party	Current Positions
Naoki Okada	60	LDP	Member of the House of Councillors (2004-present); Previous offices held: Parliamentary Vice-Minister for Land, Infrastructure, Transport and Tourism (2008–2009); State Minister of Finance (2015–2016); Deputy Chief Cabinet Secretary (2019–2021)
Tsuneko Oyamada	44	CDP	Deputy leader of the CDP Ishikawa Confederation; Previous offices held: Pre-qualification instructor
Hiroshi Nishimura	67	JCP	Deputy Secretary-General of the JCP Ishikawa Committee
Hitoshi Sakioki	46	Sanseitō	Deputy leader of the Sanseitō Ishikawa branch; Previous offices held: Executive Officer of a Convenience Store Company
Shinichi Yamada	51	Anti-NHK	Individual investor; Previous offices held: Japanese restaurant clerk
Takayuki Harihara	50	Ishin Seito Shimpu	Leader of the Ishin Seito Shinpu Ishikawa branch; Previous offices held: Temporary worker

=== Result ===
Ishikawa at-large district election
Party	Candidate	Votes	%	±%
LDP	Naoki Okada	274,253	64.53%	
CDP	Tsuneko Oyamada	83,766	19.71%	New
JCP	Hiroshi Nishimura	23,119	5.44%	N/A
Sanseitō	Hitoshi Sakioki	21,567	5.07%	New
Anti-NHK	Shinichi Yamada	12,120	2.85%	N/A
Ishin Seito Shimpu	Takayuki Harihara	10,188	2.40%	N/A
Total votes		425,013	100.0%	
LDP hold				

== Iwate at-large district ==
Iwate at-large district election
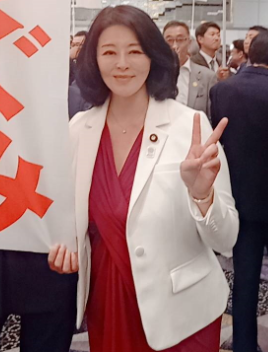

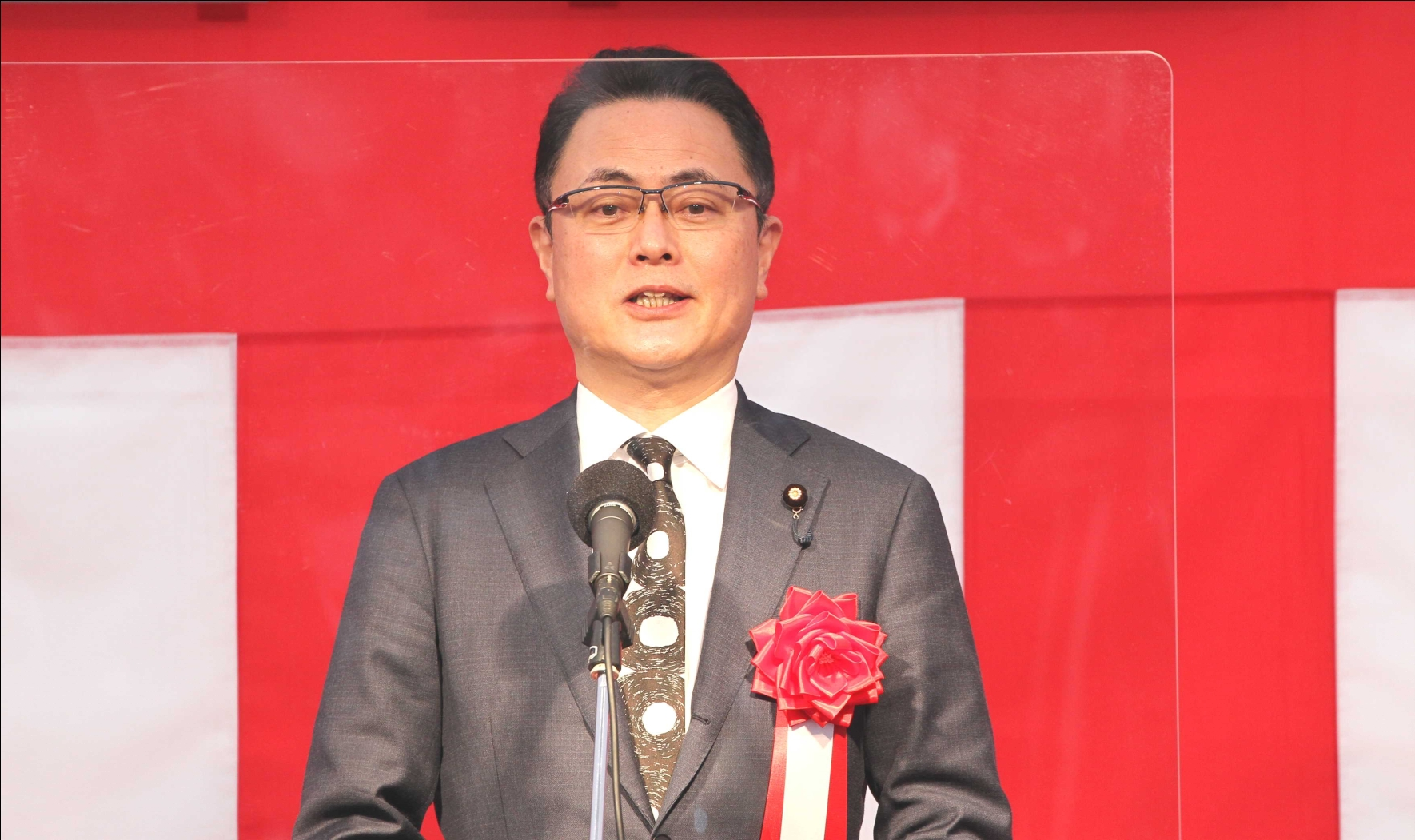
Nominee	Megumi Hirose	Eiji Kidoguchi
Party	LDP	CDP
Popular vote	264,422	242,174
Percentage	47.17%	43.20%
Supported by	Komeito
Councillor before election
Eiji Kidoguchi
CDP
Elected Councillor
Megumi Hirose
LDP

=== Candidates ===
Name	Age	Party	Current Positions
Eiji Kidoguchi	58	CDP	Member of the House of Councillors (2016-present); Previous offices held: Member of the Iwate Prefectural Council (2003–2007); Takuya Tasso's secretary
Megumi Hirose	56	LDP	Attorney; Vice president of the Woman Bureau of the LDP Iwate Confederation
Kenshi Shiratori	51	Sanseitō	President of a housing construction company
Takashi Matsuda	48	Anti-NHK	Leader of a support organization for the needy
Hiroko Ōgoshi	58	Independent	Self-employment

=== Result ===
Iwate at-large district election
Party	Candidate	Votes	%	±%
LDP	Megumi Hirose	264,422	47.17%	
CDP	Eiji Kidoguchi	242,174	43.20%	New
Sanseitō	Kenshi Shiratori	26,960	4.81%	New
Independent	Hiroko Ōgoshi	13,637	2.43%	N/A
Anti-NHK	Takashi Matsuda	13,352	2.38%	N/A
Total votes		560,545	100.0%	
LDP gain from CDP				

== Kagawa at-large district ==
Kagawa at-large district election
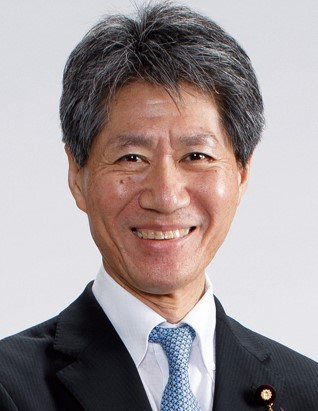

Nominee	Yoshihiko Isozaki	Shōko Mitani	Kunio Moteki
Party	LDP	DPP	CDP
Popular vote	199,135	59,614	52,897
Percentage	51.50%	15.42%	13.68%
Supported by	Komeito
Councillor before election
Yoshihiko Isozaki
LDP
Elected Councillor
Yoshihiko Isozaki
LDP

=== Candidates ===
Name	Age	Party	Current Positions
Yoshihiko Isozaki	64	LDP	Member of the House of Councillors (2010-present); Deputy Chief Cabinet Secretary (2021-present); Previous offices held: Parliamentary Vice-Minister for Economy, Trade and Industry (2013–2014); Parliamentary Vice-Minister of Cabinet Office; State Minister of Finance (2013–2014); Chair of the Environment Committee of the House of Councillors (2016)
Kunio Moteki	35	CDP	Deputy leader of the CDP Kagawa Confederation; Previous offices held: Member of the Tonoshō Town Council (2019–2021)
Shōko Mitani	55	DPP	Patent attorney; Previous offices held: Japan Patent Office staff
Junko Machikawa	63	Ishin	None Previous offices held: Secretary of a Member of the House of Councillors; Beauty company management
Mayu Ishida	40	JCP	Standing member of the JCP Kagawa Committee; Previous offices held: Chair of the Democratic Youth League of Japan Kagawa Committee
Naomi Kobayashi	48	Sanseitō	None Previous offices held: English instructor; Clothing manufacturer employee
Junichi Ikeda	41	Anti-NHK	Guest house management; Previous offices held: Nutritionist
Hideki Kashima	78	Ishin Seito Shimpu	Leader of the Ishin Seito Shinpu Kagawa branch; Previous offices held: Restaurant management

=== Result ===
Kagawa at-large district election
Party	Candidate	Votes	%	±%
LDP	Yoshihiko Isozaki	199,135	51.50%	
DPP	Shōko Mitani	59,614	15.42%	New
CDP	Kunio Moteki	52,897	13.68%	New
Ishin	Junko Machikawa	33,399	8.64%	New
JCP	Mayu Ishida	18,070	4.67%	N/A
Sanseitō	Naomi Kobayashi	13,528	3.50%	New
Anti-NHK	Junichi Ikeda	7,116	1.84%	N/A
Ishin Seito Shimpu	Hideki Kashima	2,890	0.75%	N/A
Total votes		386,649	100.0%	
LDP hold				

== Kagoshima at-large district ==
Kagoshima at-large district election
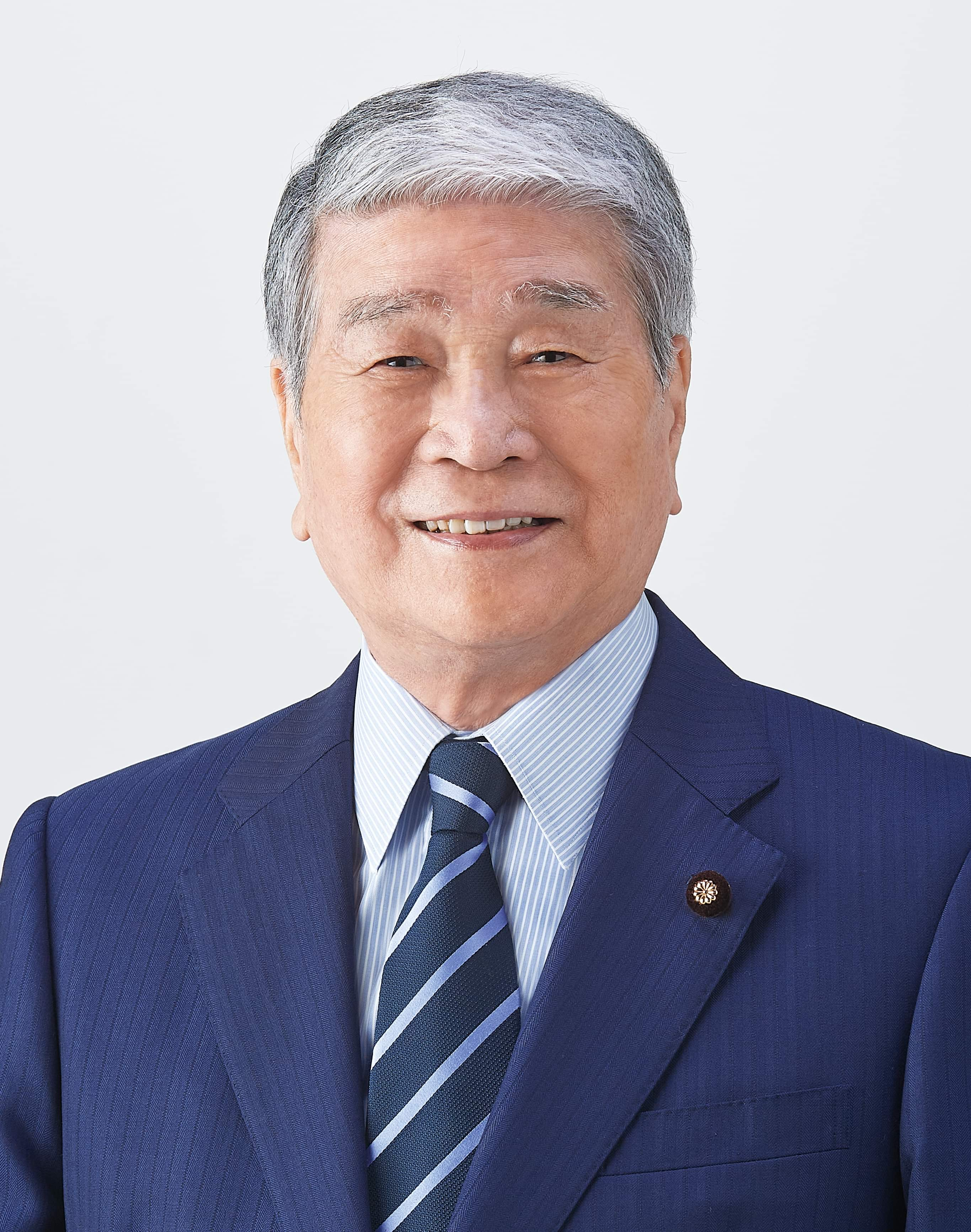

Nominee	Tetsuro Nomura	Seiko Yanagi	Ayumi Saigō
Party	LDP	CDP	Independent
Popular vote	291,169	185,055	93,372
Percentage	46.01%	29.24%	14.75%
Supported by	Komeito	DPP, SDP
Councillor before election
Tetsuro Nomura
LDP
Elected Councillor
Tetsuro Nomura
LDP

=== Candidates ===
Name	Age	Party	Current Positions
Tetsuro Nomura	78	LDP	Member of the House of Councillors (2004-present); Previous offices held: Parliamentary Secretary for Agriculture, Forestry and Fisheries (2008–2009); Chair of the Agriculture, Forestry and Fisheries Committee of the House of Councillors
Seiko Yanagi	61	CDP	Leader of the CDP Kagoshima Confederation; Previous offices held: Member of the Kagoshima Prefectural Assembly (2007–2022)
Ayumi Saigō	37	Independent	None Previous offices held: Member of the Chūō-ku Council (2015–2017); Member of the Tokyo Metropolitan Assembly (2017–2021)
Takuma Nobori	32	Sanseitō	Home appliance purchasing business
Atsushi Kusao	53	Anti-NHK	Executive of Waste disposal company

=== Result ===
Kagoshima at-large district election
Party	Candidate	Votes	%	±%
LDP	Tetsuro Nomura	291,169	46.01%	
CDP	Seiko Yanagi	185,055	29.24%	New
Independent	Ayumi Saigō	93,372	14.75%	New
Sanseitō	Takuma Nobori	47,479	7.50%	New
Anti-NHK	Atsushi Kusao	15,770	2.49%	N/A
Total votes		632,845	100.0%	
LDP hold				

== Kumamoto at-large district ==
Kumamoto at-large district election
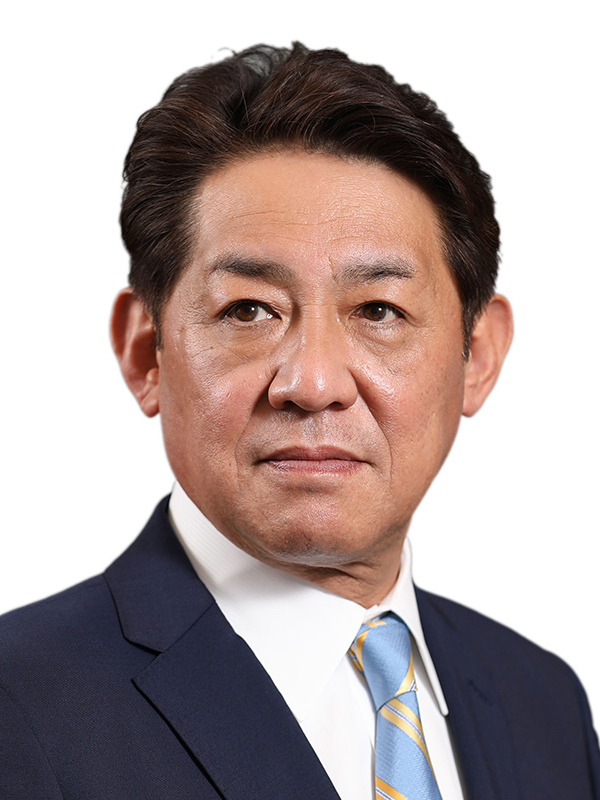

Nominee	Yoshifumi Matsumura	Shintaro Deguchi	Chitose Takai
Party	LDP	CDP	Sanseitō
Popular vote	426,623	149,780	78,101
Percentage	62.17%	21.83%	11.38%
Supported by	Komeito	SDP
Councillor before election
Yoshifumi Matsumura
LDP
Elected Councillor
Yoshifumi Matsumura
LDP

=== Candidates ===
Name	Age	Party	Current Positions
Yoshifumi Matsumura	58	LDP	Member of the House of Councillors (2004-present); Previous offices held: Parliamentary Vice-Minister for Economy, Trade and Industry (2008–2009); State Minister of Economy, Trade and Industry (2016–2017)
Shintaro Deguchi	40	CDP	Deputy leader of the CDP Kumamoto Confederation; Previous offices held: Employee of the disabled children supporting facility
Chitose Takai	36	Sanseitō	Dentist
Akiko Honma	40	Anti-NHK	Leader of the Political Organization; Website creating campany employee

=== Result ===
Kumamoto at-large district election
Party	Candidate	Votes	%	±%
LDP	Yoshifumi Matsumura	426,623	62.17%	
CDP	Shintaro Deguchi	149,780	21.83%	New
Sanseitō	Chitose Takai	78,101	11.38%	New
Anti-NHK	Akiko Honma	31,734	4.62%	N/A
Total votes		686,238	100.0%	
LDP hold				

== Mie at-large district ==
Mie at-large district election
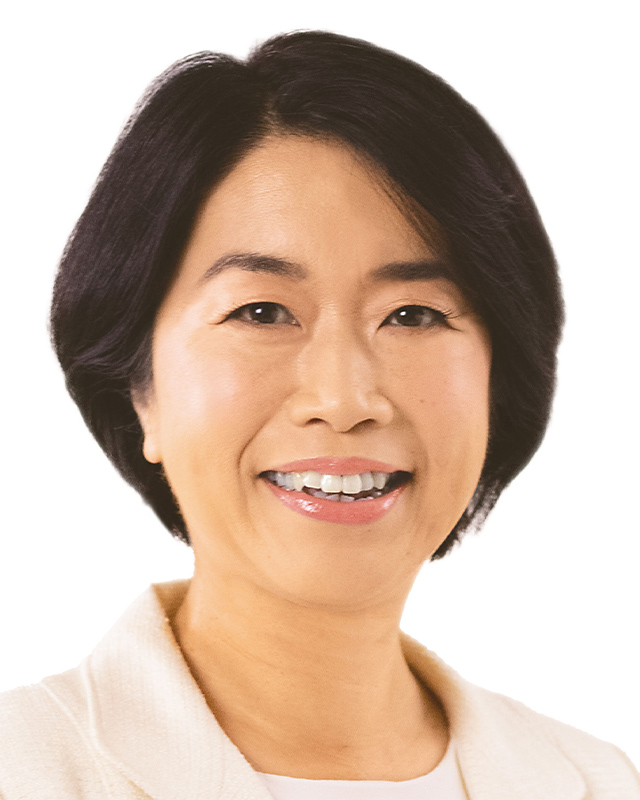

Nominee	Sachiko Yamamoto	Masahide Yoshino
Party	LDP	Independent
Popular vote	403,630	278,508
Percentage	53.44%	36.87%
Supported by	Komeito	CDP, DPP, SDP
Councillor before election
Hirokazu Shiba
CDP
Elected Councillor
Sachiko Yamamoto
LDP

=== Candidates ===
Name	Age	Party	Current Positions
Sachiko Yamamoto	54	LDP	None Previous offices held: Member of the Mie Prefectural Assembly (2019–2022); Travel company employee
Masahide Yoshino	47	Independent	None Previous offices held: Member of the Yokkaichi City Council (2011–2015); Member of the Mie Prefectural Assembly (2015–2019); Katsuya Okada's policy Secretary
Tamae Horie	47	Sanseitō	Nurse; Care manager
Setsuyo Kadota	54	Anti-NHK	Leader of the Political Organization; Previous offices held: Dispatched worker

=== Result ===
Mie at-large district election
Party	Candidate	Votes	%	±%
LDP	Sachiko Yamamoto	403,630	53.44%	
Independent	Masahide Yoshino	278,508	36.87%	New
Sanseitō	Tamae Horie	51,069	6.76%	New
Anti-NHK	Setsuyo Kadota	22,128	2.93%	N/A
Total votes		755,335	100.0%	
LDP gain from CDP				

== Miyagi at-large district ==
Miyagi at-large district election
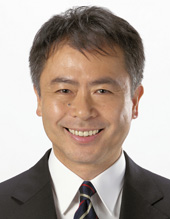

Nominee	Mitsuru Sakurai	Kimiko Obata	Midori Hirai
Party	LDP	CDP	Ishin
Popular vote	472,963	271,455	91,924
Percentage	51.94%	29.81%	10.10%
Supported by	Komeito
Councillor before election
Mitsuru Sakurai
LDP
Elected Councillor
Mitsuru Sakurai
LDP

=== Candidates ===
Name	Age	Party	Current Positions
Mitsuru Sakurai	66	LDP	Doctor; Member of the House of Councillors (1998-present); Previous offices held: State Minister of Finance (2010–2011); State Minister of Health, Labour and Welfare (2012); Chair of the DPJ Policy Research Committee (2012–2014)
Kimiko Obata	44	CDP	Nurse; Previous offices held: Member of the Miyagi Prefectural Assembly (2019–2022)
Midori Hirai	67	Ishin	President of the Aoba-ku Karatedo Association of the Japan Karatedo Confederation; Previous offices held: Member of the Sendai City Council (2015–2019)
Ayako Lawrence	52	Sanseitō	Minister; Translater
Tomoya Nakae	30	Anti-NHK	Deputy leader of the political organization; Previous offices held: Employee of a recision machine processing company

=== Result ===
Miyagi at-large district election
Party	Candidate	Votes	%	±%
LDP	Mitsuru Sakurai	472,963	51.94%	
CDP	Kimiko Obata	271,455	29.81%	New
Ishin	Midori Hirai	91,924	10.10%	New
Sanseitō	Ayako Lawrence	52,938	5.81%	New
Anti-NHK	Tomoya Nakae	21,286	2.34%	N/A
Total votes		910,566	100.0%	
LDP hold				

== Miyazaki at-large district ==
Miyazaki at-large district election
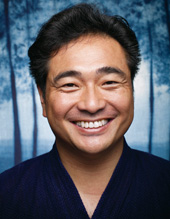

Nominee	Shinpei Matsushita	Nana Kuroda
Party	LDP	CDP
Popular vote	200,565	150,911
Percentage	48.00%	36.12%
Supported by	Komeito
Councillor before election
Shinpei Matsushita
LDP
Elected Councillor
Shinpei Matsushita
LDP

=== Candidates ===
Name	Age	Party	Current Positions
Shinpei Matsushita	55	LDP	Member of the House of Councillors (2004-present); Previous offices held: Member of the Miyazaki Prefectural Assembly (1999–2004); State Minister for Internal Affairs and Communications (2015–2016)
Nana Kuroda	48	CDP	Certified Weather Forecaster; Previous offices held: Representative of the child raising support organization
Akimitsu Kurogi	45	DPP	None Previous offices held: Japan Air Self-Defense Force Official; Secretary of a member of the House of Representatives
Yoshitomo Shirae	33	JCP	Standing member of the JCP Miyazaki Committee; Previous offices held: Chair of the Democratic Youth League of Japan Miyazaki
Yukifumi Imamura	49	Sanseitō	President of Architecture company; Previous offices held: Representative of the poor family support organization
Daichi Mori	30	Anti-NHK	None Previous offices held: Company employee

=== Result ===
Miyazaki at-large district election
Party	Candidate	Votes	%	±%
LDP	Shinpei Matsushita	200,565	48.00%	
CDP	Nana Kuroda	150,911	36.12%	New
DPP	Akimitsu Kurogi	30,162	7.22%	New
Sanseitō	Yukifumi Imamura	15,670	3.75%	New
JCP	Yoshitomo Shirae	12,260	2.93%	N/A
Anti-NHK	Daichi Mori	8,255	1.98%	N/A
Total votes		417,823	100.0%	
LDP hold				

== Nagano at-large district ==
Nagano at-large district election
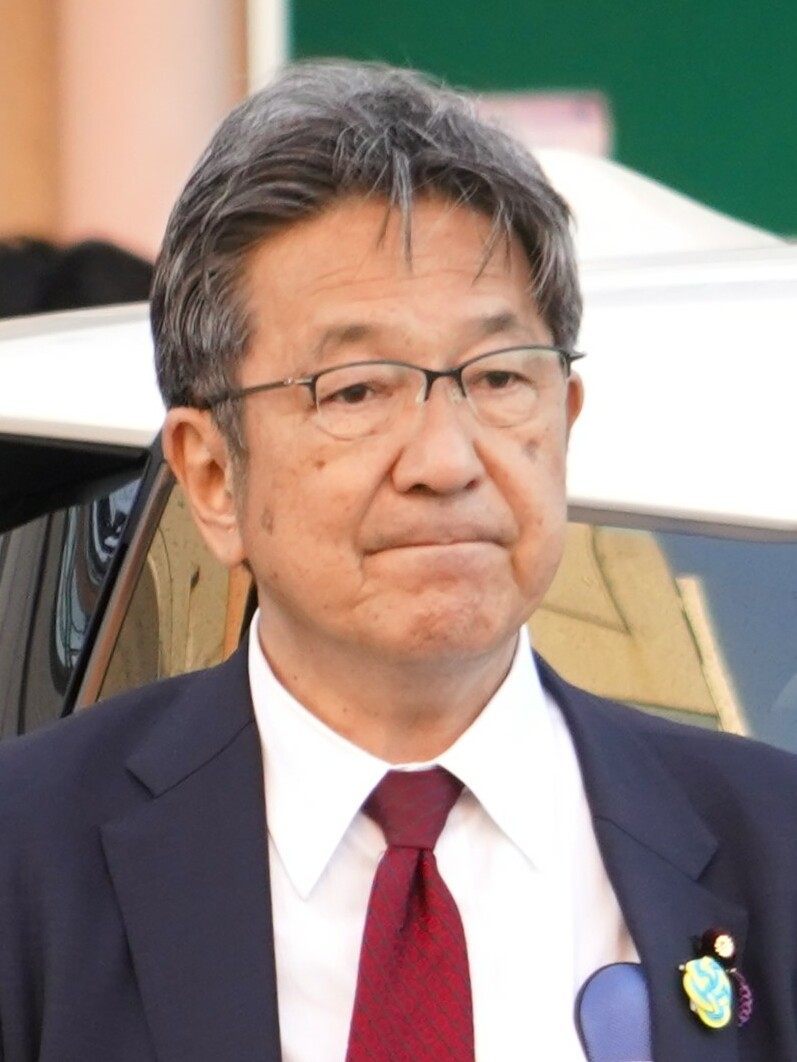

Nominee	Hideya Sugio	Sanshiro Matsuyama	Daisuke Tezuka
Party	CDP	LDP	Ishin
Popular vote	433,154	376,028	102,223
Percentage	44.62%	38.74%	10.53%
Supported by	JCP, SDP	Komeito
Councillor before election
Hideya Sugio
CDP
Elected Councillor
Hideya Sugio
CDP

=== Candidates ===
Name	Age	Party	Current Positions
Hideya Sugio	64	CDP	Member of the House of Councillors (2016-present); Acting leader of the CDP Nagano Confederation; Previous offices held: TBS News Presenter
Sanshiro Matsuyama	52	LDP	Deputy leader of the LDP Nagano Confederation; Previous offices held: Radio personality
Daisuke Tezuka	39	Ishin	Leader of the Ishin Nagano branch; Executive of the Internet relation company
Yoshiharu Akiyama	45	Sanseitō	Traditional bone-setter
Chiho Hidaka	43	Anti-NHK	Executive of a company
Salsa Iwabuchi	44	Independent	Journalist; Previous offices held: Boxer

=== Result ===
Nagano at-large district election
Party	Candidate	Votes	%	±%
CDP	Hideya Sugio	433,154	44.62%	New
LDP	Sanshiro Matsuyama	376,028	38.74%	
Ishin	Daisuke Tezuka	102,223	10.53%	N/A
Sanseitō	Yoshiharu Akiyama	31,644	3.26%	New
Anti-NHK	Chiho Hidaka	16,646	1.71%	N/A
Independent	Salsa Iwabuchi	10,978	1.13%	New
Total votes		970,673	100.0%	
CDP hold				

== Nagasaki at-large district ==
Nagasaki at-large district election
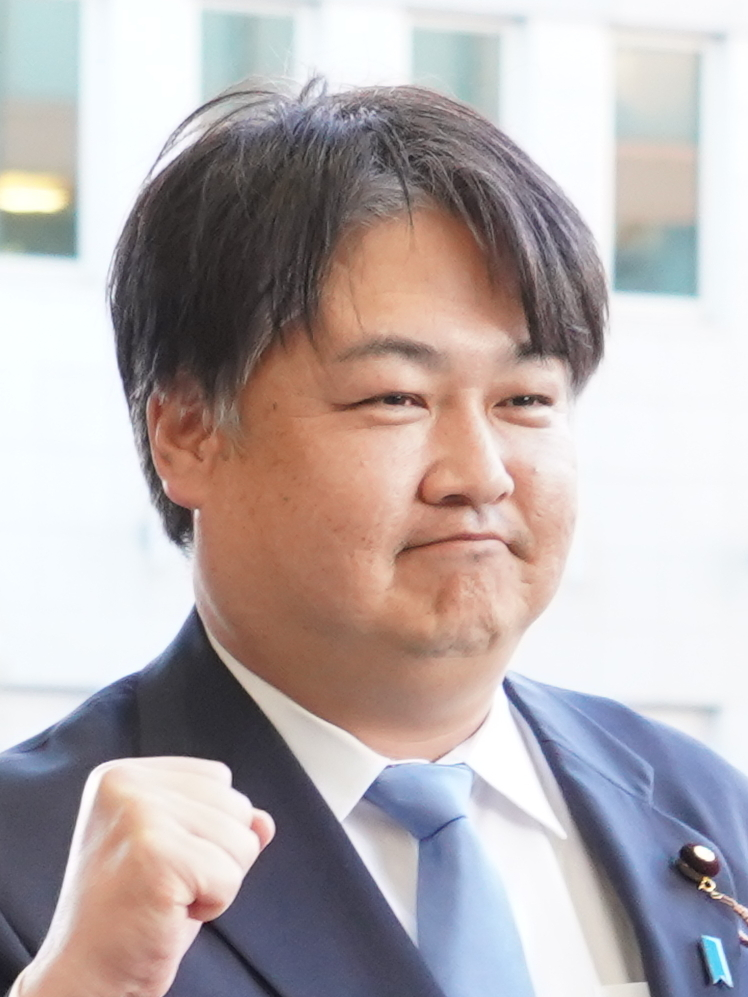

Nominee	Keisuke Yamamoto	Ayumi Shirakawa	Mami Yamada
Party	LDP	CDP	Ishin
Popular vote	261,554	152,473	53,715
Percentage	50.07%	29.19%	10.28%
Supported by	Komeito	SDP
Councillor before election
Genjirō Kaneko
LDP
Elected Councillor
Keisuke Yamamoto
LDP

=== Candidates ===
Name	Age	Party	Current Positions
Keisuke Yamamoto	47	LDP	None Previous offices held: Secretary of Kazuo Torashima; Secretary of Yaichi Tanigawa; Member of the Nagasaki Prefectural Assembly (2011–2022)
Ayumi Shirakawa	42	CDP	President of a consulting company; Deputy leader of the CDP Nagasaki Confederation
Mami Yamada	50	Ishin	Vice executive secretary of the Ishin Nagasaki branch; Previous offices held: Secretary of a member of the Nagasaki Prefectural Assembly
Ayako Yasue	45	JCP	Standing member of the JCP Nagasaki Committee; Leader of the JCP Nagasaki Woman Bureau
Ayako Ogata	47	Sanseitō	Company supporting consultant
Kazuto Ōkuma	52	Anti-NHK	Part-time job worker

=== Result ===
Nagasaki at-large district election
Party	Candidate	Votes	%	±%
LDP	Keisuke Yamamoto	261,554	50.07%	
CDP	Ayumi Shirakawa	152,473	29.19%	New
Ishin	Mami Yamada	53,715	10.28%	N/A
JCP	Ayako Yasue	26,281	5.03%	N/A
Sanseitō	Ayako Ogata	21,363	4.09%	New
Anti-NHK	Kazuto Ōkuma	6,969	1.33%	N/A
Total votes		522,355	100.0%	
LDP hold				

== Nara at-large district ==
Nara at-large district election
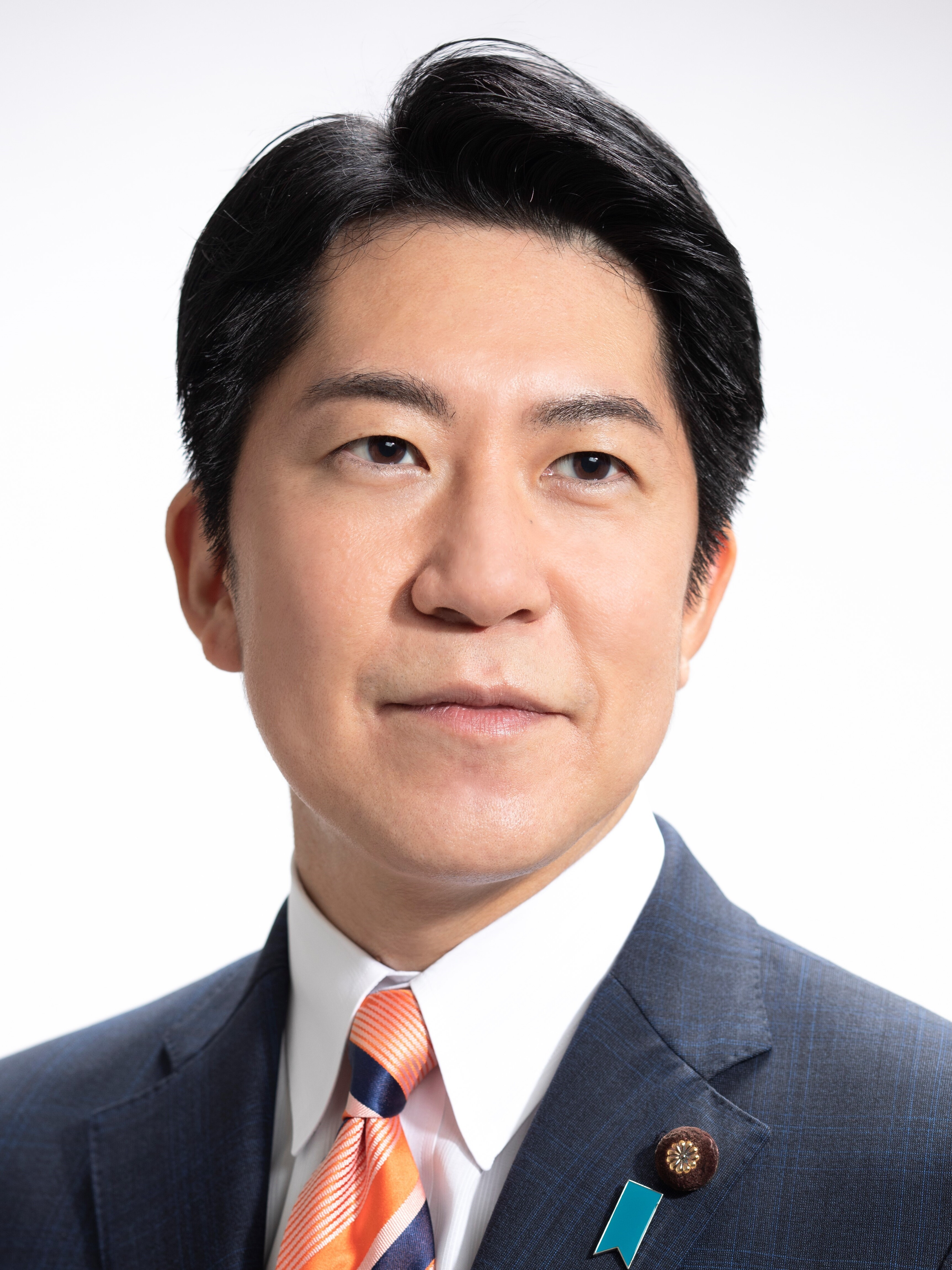

Nominee	Kei Satō	Takashi Nakagawa	Misato Ioku
Party	LDP	Ishin	CDP
Popular vote	256,139	180,124	98,757
Percentage	41.67%	29.30%	16.07%
Supported by	Komeito
Councillor before election
Kei Satō
LDP
Elected Councillor
Kei Satō
LDP

=== Candidates ===
Name	Age	Party	Current Positions
Kei Satō	43	LDP	Member of the House of Councillors (2016-present); Previous offices held: Personnel of the Ministry of Internal Affairs and Communications; Parliamentary Vice-Minister for Economy, Trade and Industry (2020–2021); Parliamentary Vice-Minister of Cabinet Office (2020–2021); Parliamentary Vice-Minister for Reconstruction (2020–2021)
Misato Ioku	42	CDP	None Previous offices held: Secretary of a member of the House of Representatives; Member of the Nara Prefectural Assembly (2011–2021)
Takashi Nakagawa	36	Ishin	None Previous offices held: Secretary of a member of the House of Representatives; Member of the Nara Prefectural Assembly (2015–2021)
Itsuko Kitano	46	JCP	None Previous offices held: Baker; Member of the Yamatokōriyama City Council (2015–2019)
Mami Nakamura	43	Sanseitō	Psychotherapist
Tetsuyuki Tomida	70	Anti-NHK	Acupuncturist; Certified Care Worker

=== Result ===
Nara at-large district election
Party	Candidate	Votes	%	±%
LDP	Kei Satō	256,139	41.67%	
Ishin	Takashi Nakagawa	180,124	29.30%	
CDP	Misato Ioku	98,757	16.07%	New
JCP	Itsuko Kitano	42,609	6.93%	N/A
Sanseitō	Mami Nakamura	28,919	4.70%	New
Anti-NHK	Tetsuyuki Tomida	8,161	1.33%	N/A
Total votes		614,709	100.0%	
LDP hold				

== Niigata at-large district ==
Niigata at-large district election
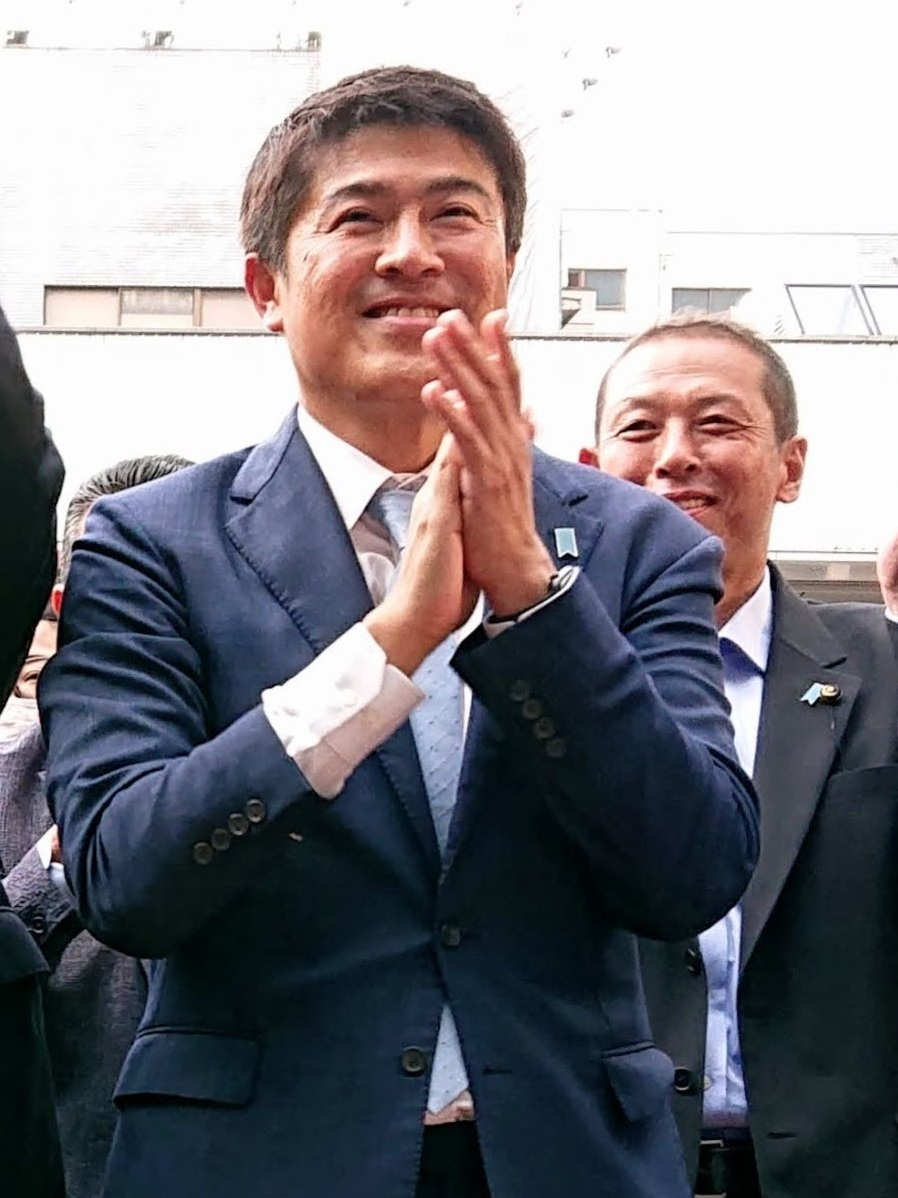

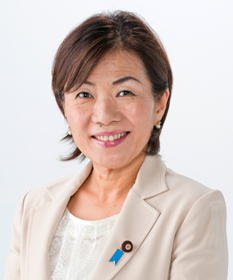
Nominee	Kazuhiro Kobayashi	Yuko Mori
Party	LDP	CDP
Popular vote	517,581	448,651
Percentage	50.95%	44.17%
Supported by	Komeito	SDP
Councillor before election
Yuko Mori
CDP
Elected Councillor
Kazuhiro Kobayashi
LDP

=== Candidates ===
Name	Age	Party	Current Positions
Yuko Mori	66	CDP	Member of the House of Councillors (2001-2013; 2016-present); Previous offices held: Member of the Yokogoshi Town Council (1999–2001); State Minister of Education, Culture, Sports, Science and Technology (2011–2012)
Kazuhiro Kobayashi	49	LDP	Chair of the Policy Affairs Research Council of the LDP Niigata Confederation; Previous offices held: Member of the Niigata Prefectural Assembly (2007–2022)
Hiroki Endo	42	Sanseitō	Employee of a company
Hiroyuki Ochi	48	Anti-NHK	President of the Internet relation company

=== Result ===
Niigata at-large district election
Party	Candidate	Votes	%	±%
LDP	Kazuhiro Kobayashi	517,581	50.95%	
CDP	Yuko Mori	448,651	44.17%	New
Sanseitō	Hiroki Endo	32,500	3.20%	New
Anti-NHK	Hiroyuki Ochi	17,098	1.68%	N/A
Total votes		1,015,830	100.0%	
LDP gain from CDP				

== Ōita at-large district ==
Ōita at-large district election
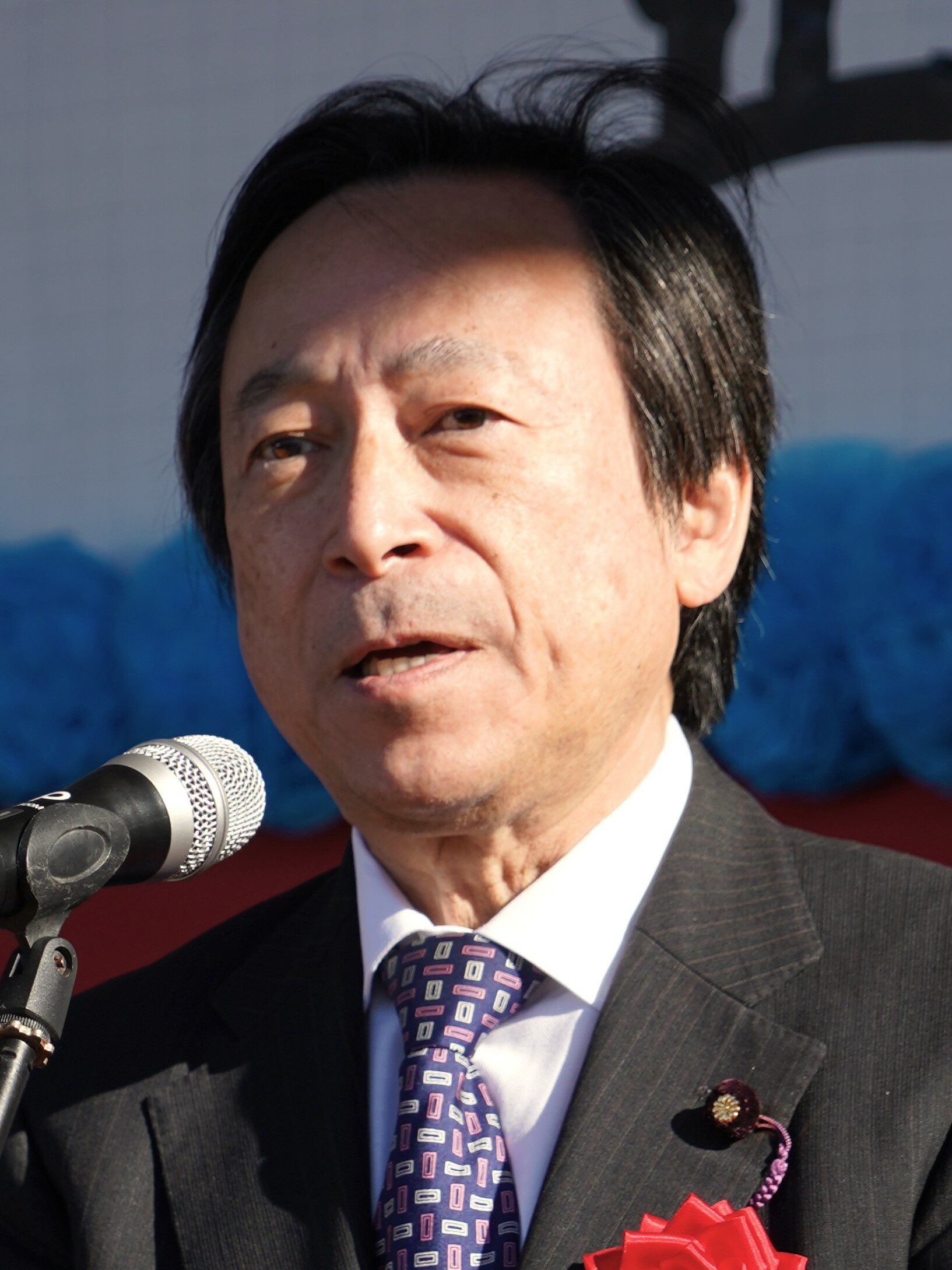

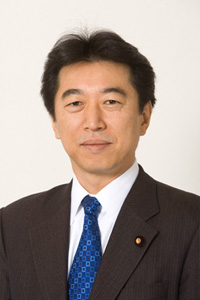
Nominee	Harutomo Kosho	Shinya Adachi
Party	LDP	DPP
Popular vote	228,417	183,258
Percentage	46.58%	37.37%
Supported by	Komeito
Councillor before election
Shinya Adachi
DPP
Elected Councillor
Harutomo Kosho
LDP

=== Candidates ===
Name	Age	Party	Current Positions
Shinya Adachi	65	DPP	Member of the House of Councillors (2004-present); Previous offices held: Parliamentary Secretary for Health, Labour and Welfare (2009–2010)
Harutomo Kosho	64	LDP	Attorney; Previous offices held: Leader of the Ōita Attorney Association
Kai Yamashita	45	JCP	Secretary-General of the JCP Ōita Committee; Previous offices held: Chair of the Democratic Youth League of Japan Ōita Committee
Yūko Shigematsu	63	Sanseitō	Food Consultant; Previous offices held: Elementary School Teacher
Daizo Ninomiya	51	Anti-NHK	Taxi driver; Previous offices held: Wagyu farmer
Yūichi Kotegawa	55	Independent	Activist; Previous offices held: Personnel of the Beppu City

=== Result ===
Ōita at-large district election
Party	Candidate	Votes	%	±%
LDP	Harutomo Kosho	228,417	46.58%	
DPP	Shinya Adachi	183,258	37.37%	New
JCP	Kai Yamashita	35,705	7.28%	N/A
Sanseitō	Yūko Shigematsu	21,723	4.43%	New
Anti-NHK	Daizo Ninomiya	10,770	2.20%	N/A
Independent	Yūichi Kotegawa	10,512	2.14%	N/A
Total votes		490,385	100.0%	
LDP gain from DPP				

== Okayama at-large district ==
Okayama at-large district election
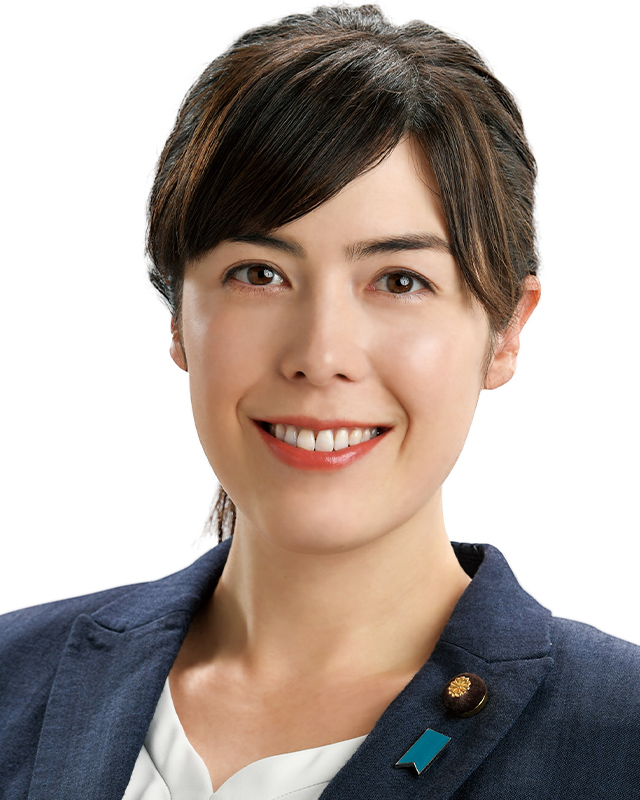

Nominee	Kimi Onoda	Susumu Kuroda
Party	LDP	Independent
Popular vote	392,553	211,419
Percentage	54.74%	29.48%
Supported by		CDP, DPP
Councillor before election
Kimi Onoda
LDP
Elected Councillor
Kimi Onoda
LDP

=== Candidates ===
Name	Age	Party	Current Positions
Kimi Onoda	39	LDP	Member of the House of Councillors (2016-present); Previous offices held: Member of the Kita Ward Council (2011–2015); Parliamentary Secretary for Justice (2020–2021)
Susumu Kuroda	58	Independent	None Previous offices held: Member of the Tamano City Councill (1995–2005); Mayor of Tamano City (2005–2021)
Satomi Sumiyori	39	JCP	Chair of the Youth and Student Office of the JCP Okayama; Previous offices held: Elementary School teacher
Yuriko Takano	46	Sanseitō	None Previous offices held: Part-time job worker
Takahira Yamamoto	47	Anti-NHK	NHK staff; Previous offices held: Employee of a logistics company

=== Result ===
Okayama at-large district election
Party	Candidate	Votes	%	±%
LDP	Kimi Onoda	392,553	54.74%	
Independent	Susumu Kuroda	211,419	29.48%	New
JCP	Satomi Sumiyori	59,481	8.29%	N/A
Sanseitō	Yuriko Takano	37,281	5.20%	New
Anti-NHK	Takahira Yamamoto	16,441	2.29%	N/A
Total votes		717,175	100.0%	
LDP hold				

== Okinawa at-large district ==
Okinawa at-large district election
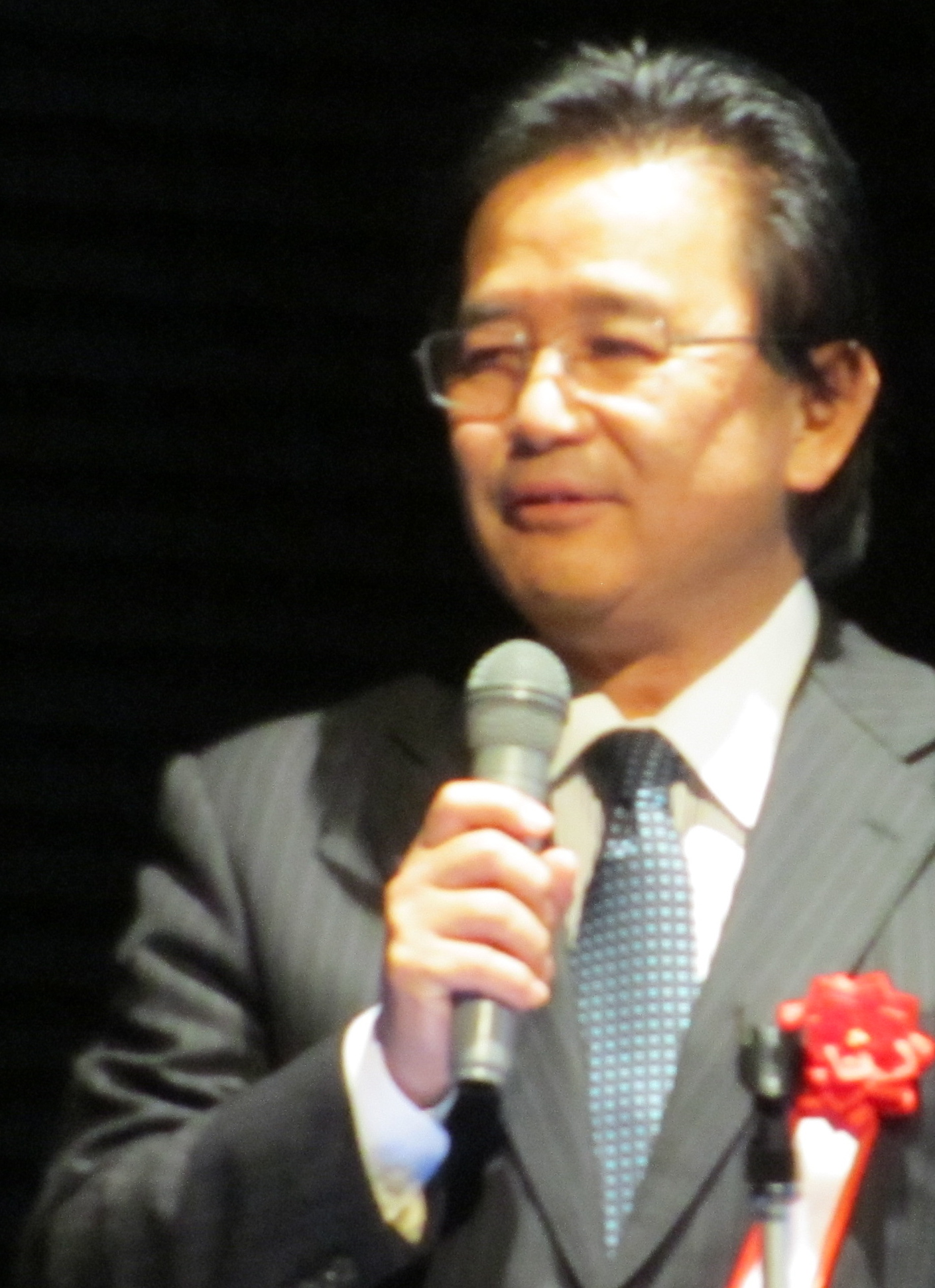

Nominee	Yōichi Iha	Genta Koja
Party	Independent	LDP
Popular vote	274,235	271,347
Percentage	46.89%	46.40%
Supported by	CDP, JCP, SDP, OSMP	Komeito
Councillor before election
Yōichi Iha
Independent
Elected Councillor
Yōichi Iha
Independent

=== Candidates ===
Name	Age	Party	Current Positions
Yōichi Iha	70	Independent	Member of the House of Councillors (2016-present); Previous offices held: Member of the Okinawa Prefectural Assembly (1996–2003); Mayor of Ginowan City (2003–2010)
Genta Koja	38	LDP	None Previous offices held: Personnel of Ministry of Internal Affairs and Communications; Manager of the Data Management Institute of the NTT
Sadafumi Kawano	48	Sanseitō	Self-employment; Previous offices held: Fukuoka Prefectural Police Officer
Kei Yamamoto	42	Anti-NHK	Self-employment; Shipping Company employee
Tatsuro Kinjo	58	HRP	Self-employment; Previous offices held: Fukuoka Prefectural Police Officer

=== Result ===
Okinawa at-large district election
Party	Candidate	Votes	%	±%
Independent	Yōichi Iha	274,235	46.89%	
LDP	Genta Koja	271,347	46.40%	New
Sanseitō	Sadafumi Kawano	22,585	3.86%	N/A
Anti-NHK	Kei Yamamoto	11,034	1.89%	New
Happiness Realization	Tatsurō Kinjō	5,644	0.97%	N/A
Total votes		584,845	100.0%	
Independent hold				

== Saga at-large district ==
Saga at-large district election
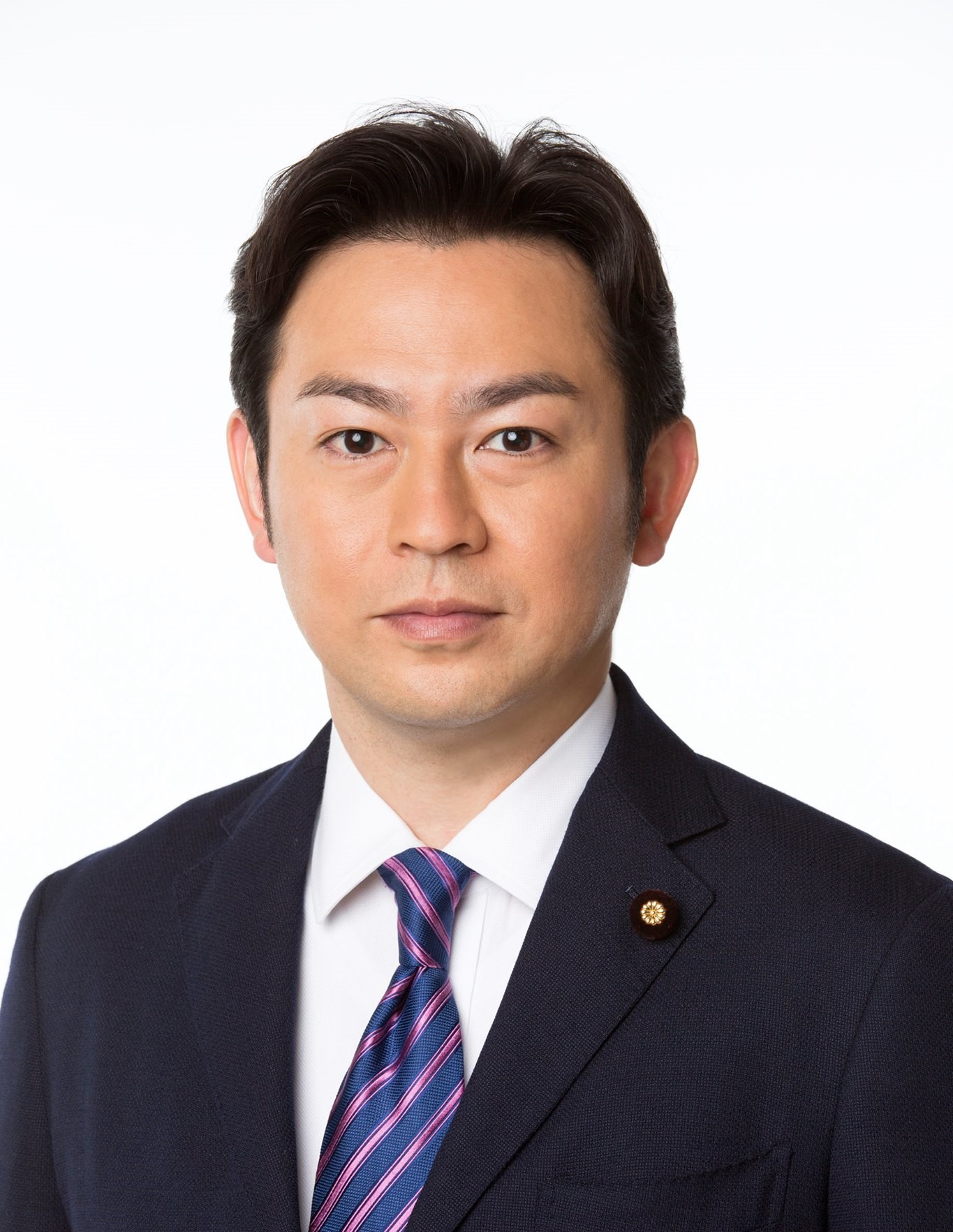

Nominee	Takamaro Fukuoka	Tsukasa Ono
Party	LDP	CDP
Popular vote	218,425	78,802
Percentage	65.19%	23.52%
Supported by	Komeito
Councillor before election
Takamaro Fukuoka
LDP
Elected Councillor
Takamaro Fukuoka
LDP

=== Candidates ===
Name	Age	Party	Current Positions
Naoki Okada	60	LDP	Member of the House of Councillors (2004-present); Previous offices held: Parliamentary Vice-Minister for Land, Infrastructure, Transport and Tourism (2008–2009); State Minister of Finance (2015–2016); Deputy Chief Cabinet Secretary (2019–2021)
Tsuneko Oyamada	44	CDP	Vice Secretary-General of RENGO Gunma; Previous offices held: Nurse
Tamotsu Takahashi	64	JCP	Chair of the Life and Employment Policy Office of the JCP Gunma; Previous offices held: Elementary School teacher
Tetsuro Niikura	43	Sanseitō	Chief Executive Officer of a Training Company; Previous offices held: Fighter
Tadafumi Kojima	46	Anti-NHK	Leader of the Political Organization; Shipping Company employee

=== Result ===
Gunma at-large district election
Party	Candidate	Votes	%	±%
LDP	Hirofumi Nakasone	476,017	63.83%	
Independent	Keiko Shirai	138,429	18.56%	New
JCP	Tamotsu Takahashi	69,490	9.32%	N/A
Sanseitō	Tetsuro Niikura	39,523	5.30%	New
Anti-NHK	Tadafumi Kojima	22,276	2.99%	N/A
Total votes		856,007	100.0%	
LDP hold				

== Shiga at-large district ==
Shiga at-large district election
- 10 July 2022
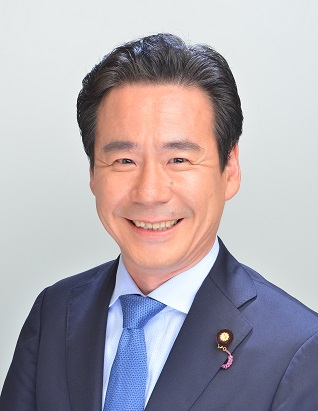

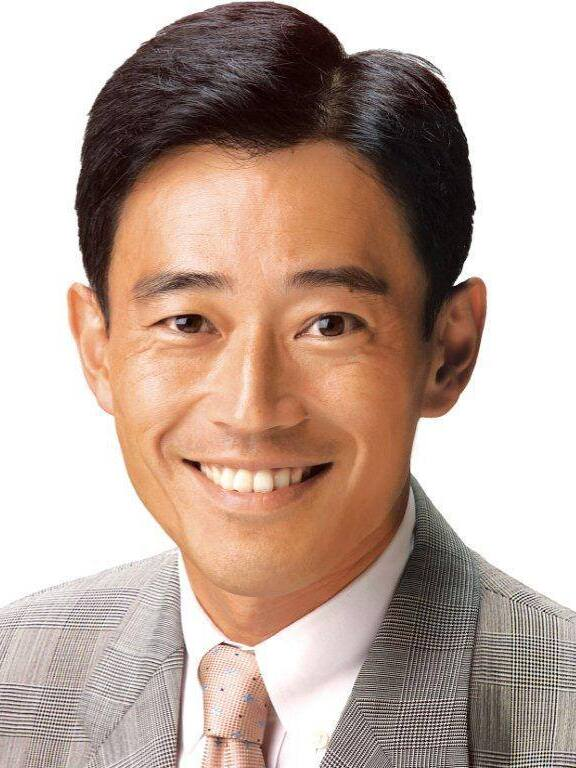
Nominee	Takashi Koyari	Issei Tajima
Party	LDP	Independent
Popular vote	315,249	190,700
Percentage	51.64%	31.24%
Supported by	Komeito	CDP, DPP
Councillor before election
Takashi Koyari
LDP
Elected Councillor
Takashi Koyari
LDP

=== Candidates ===
Name	Age	Party	Current Positions
Takashi Koyari	55	LDP	Member of the House of Councillors (2016-present)
Issei Tajima	60	Independent	Former Member of the House of Representatives
Junji Ishidō	48	JCP	Japanese Communist Party Shiga Prefectural Committee official
Makoto Kataoka	30	Sanseitō	Private secretary
Hayato Tanoue	57	Anti-NHK	Beauty salon operator

=== Result ===
Shiga at-large district election
Party	Candidate	Votes	%	±%
LDP	Takashi Koyari	315,249	51.64%	
Independent	Issei Tajima	190,700	31.24%	
JCP	Junji Ishido	51,742	8.48%	
Sanseitō	Makoto Kataoka	35,839	5.87%	
Anti-NHK	Hayato Tanoue	16,980	2.78%	
Total votes		610,510	100.0%	
LDP hold				

== Tochigi at-large district ==
Tochigi at-large district election
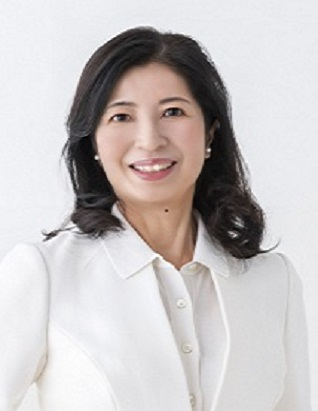

Nominee	Michiko Ueno	Miyako Itakura	Yumi Okubo
Party	LDP	CDP	Ishin
Popular vote	414,456	127,628	100,529
Percentage	56.24%	17.32%	13.64%
Supported by	Komeito
Councillor before election
Michiko Ueno
LDP
Elected Councillor
Michiko Ueno
LDP

=== Candidates ===
Name	Age	Party	Current Positions
Michiko Ueno	64	LDP	• Member of the House of Councillors (2010-present) Previous offices held: Member of the Tochigi Prefectural Assembly (2003–2010); Parliamentary Vice-Minister of Education, Culture, Sports, Science and Technology (2013–2014); State Minister of Education, Culture, Sports, Science and Technology (2019–2020)
Miyako Itakura	55	CDP	Certified Public Tax Accountant
Yumi Ōkubo	45	Ishin	Company Director
Keiko Okamura	68	JCP	
Hirosato Ōkuma	52	Sanseitō	Self-employed
Masako Takahashi	57	Anti-NHK	Counselor

=== Result ===
Tochigi at-large district election
Party	Candidate	Votes	%	±%
LDP	Michiko Ueno	414,456	56.24%	
CDP	Miyako Itakura	127,628	17.32%	
Ishin	Yumi Ōkubo	100,529	13.64%	
JCP	Keiko Okamura	44,310	6.01%	
Sanseitō	Hirosato Ōkuma	30,864	4.19%	
Anti-NHK	Masako Takahashi	19,090	2.59%	
Total votes		736,877	100.0%	
LDP hold				

== Tokushima-Kōchi at-large district ==
Tokushima Kōchi at-large district election
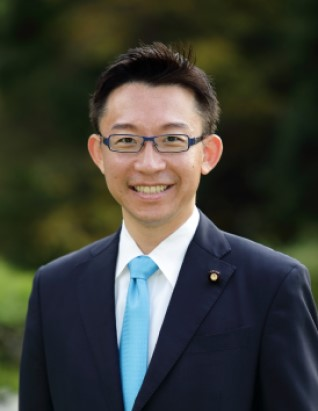

Nominee	Yūsuke Nakanishi	Kenji Matsumoto	Kenichi Fujimoto
Party	LDP	JCP	Ishin
Popular vote	287,609	103,217	62,001
Percentage	52.81%	18.95%	11.38%
Supported by	Komeito	SDP
Nominee	Tsuyoshi Maeda
Party	DPP
Popular vote	49,566
Percentage	9.10%
Councillor before election
Yūsuke Nakanishi
LDP
Elected Councillor
Yūsuke Nakanishi
LDP

=== Candidates ===
Name	Age	Party	Current Positions
Naoki Okada	60	LDP	Member of the House of Councillors (2004-present); Previous offices held: Parliamentary Vice-Minister for Land, Infrastructure, Transport and Tourism (2008–2009); State Minister of Finance (2015–2016); Deputy Chief Cabinet Secretary (2019–2021)
Tsuneko Oyamada	44	CDP	Vice Secretary-General of RENGO Gunma; Previous offices held: Nurse
Tamotsu Takahashi	64	JCP	Chair of the Life and Employment Policy Office of the JCP Gunma; Previous offices held: Elementary School teacher
Tetsuro Niikura	43	Sanseitō	Chief Executive Officer of a Training Company; Previous offices held: Fighter
Tadafumi Kojima	46	Anti-NHK	Leader of the Political Organization; Shipping Company employee

=== Result ===
Gunma at-large district election
Party	Candidate	Votes	%	±%
LDP	Hirofumi Nakasone	476,017	63.83%	
Independent	Keiko Shirai	138,429	18.56%	New
JCP	Tamotsu Takahashi	69,490	9.32%	N/A
Sanseitō	Tetsuro Niikura	39,523	5.30%	New
Anti-NHK	Tadafumi Kojima	22,276	2.99%	N/A
Total votes		856,007	100.0%	
LDP hold				

== Tottori-Shimane at-large district ==
Tottori-Shimane at-large district election
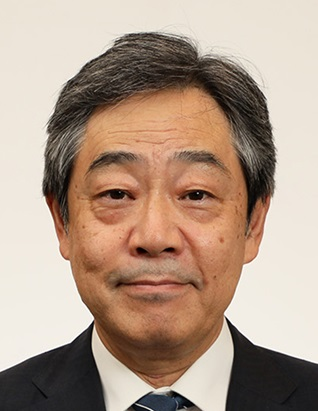

Nominee	Kazuhiko Aoki	Taijiro Murakami
Party	LDP	CDP
Popular vote	326,750	118,063
Percentage	62.50%	22.58%
Supported by	Komeito
Councillor before election
Kazuhiko Aoki
LDP
Elected Councillor
Kazuhiko Aoki
LDP

=== Candidates ===
Name	Age	Party	Current Positions
Naoki Okada	60	LDP	Member of the House of Councillors (2004-present); Previous offices held: Parliamentary Vice-Minister for Land, Infrastructure, Transport and Tourism (2008–2009); State Minister of Finance (2015–2016); Deputy Chief Cabinet Secretary (2019–2021)
Tsuneko Oyamada	44	CDP	Vice Secretary-General of RENGO Gunma; Previous offices held: Nurse
Tamotsu Takahashi	64	JCP	Chair of the Life and Employment Policy Office of the JCP Gunma; Previous offices held: Elementary School teacher
Tetsuro Niikura	43	Sanseitō	Chief Executive Officer of a Training Company; Previous offices held: Fighter
Tadafumi Kojima	46	Anti-NHK	Leader of the Political Organization; Shipping Company employee

=== Result ===
Gunma at-large district election
Party	Candidate	Votes	%	±%
LDP	Hirofumi Nakasone	476,017	63.83%	
Independent	Keiko Shirai	138,429	18.56%	New
JCP	Tamotsu Takahashi	69,490	9.32%	N/A
Sanseitō	Tetsuro Niikura	39,523	5.30%	New
Anti-NHK	Tadafumi Kojima	22,276	2.99%	N/A
Total votes		856,007	100.0%	
LDP hold				

== Toyama at-large district ==
Toyama at-large district election
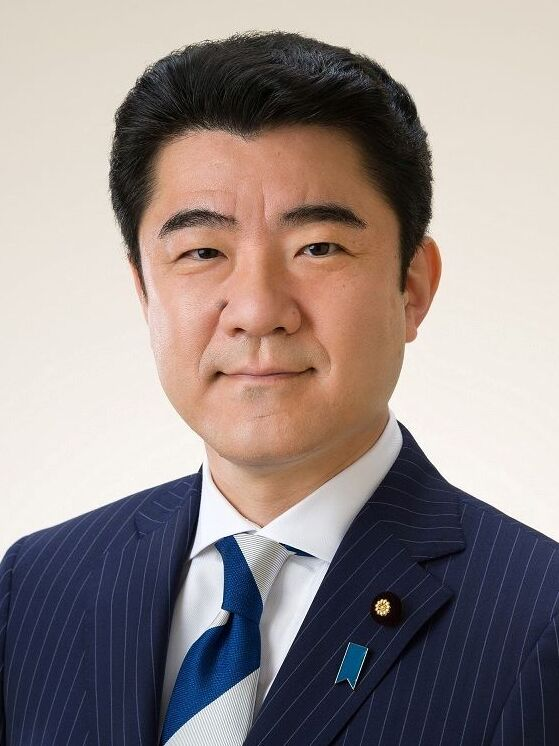

Nominee	Kōtarō Nogami	Kimitomo Kyotani	Toshihiro Yama
Party	LDP	Ishin	CDP
Popular vote	302,951	43,177	40,735
Percentage	68.77%	9.80%	9.25%
Supported by	Komeito
Councillor before election
Kōtarō Nogami
LDP
Elected Councillor
Kōtarō Nogami
LDP

=== Candidates ===
Name	Age	Party	Current Positions
Naoki Okada	60	LDP	Member of the House of Councillors (2004-present); Previous offices held: Parliamentary Vice-Minister for Land, Infrastructure, Transport and Tourism (2008–2009); State Minister of Finance (2015–2016); Deputy Chief Cabinet Secretary (2019–2021)
Tsuneko Oyamada	44	CDP	Vice Secretary-General of RENGO Gunma; Previous offices held: Nurse
Tamotsu Takahashi	64	JCP	Chair of the Life and Employment Policy Office of the JCP Gunma; Previous offices held: Elementary School teacher
Tetsuro Niikura	43	Sanseitō	Chief Executive Officer of a Training Company; Previous offices held: Fighter
Tadafumi Kojima	46	Anti-NHK	Leader of the Political Organization; Shipping Company employee

=== Result ===
Gunma at-large district election
Party	Candidate	Votes	%	±%
LDP	Hirofumi Nakasone	476,017	63.83%	
Independent	Keiko Shirai	138,429	18.56%	New
JCP	Tamotsu Takahashi	69,490	9.32%	N/A
Sanseitō	Tetsuro Niikura	39,523	5.30%	New
Anti-NHK	Tadafumi Kojima	22,276	2.99%	N/A
Total votes		856,007	100.0%	
LDP hold				

== Wakayama at-large district ==
Wakayama at-large district election
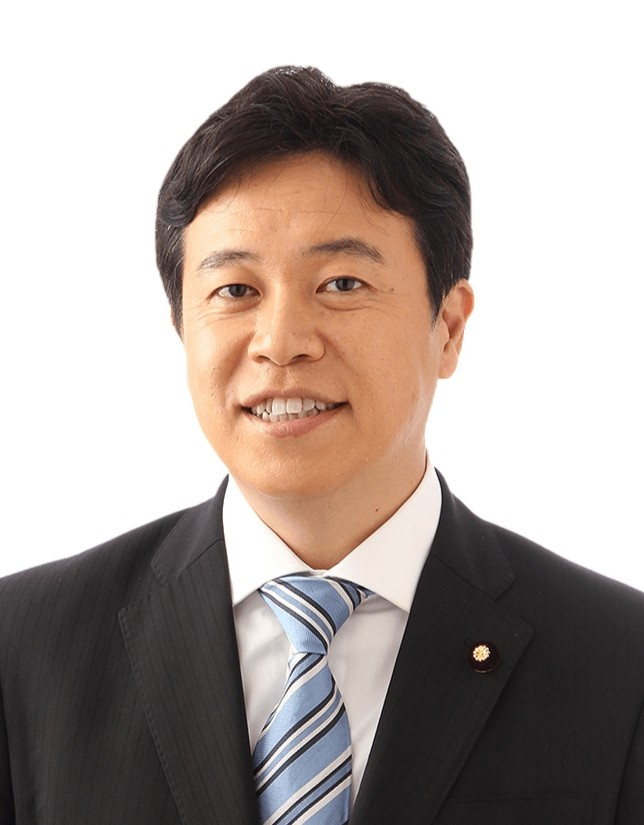

Nominee	Yōsuke Tsuruho	Hisashi Mae
Party	LDP	JCP
Popular vote	283,965	57,522
Percentage	72.06%	14.60%
Supported by	Komeito
Councillor before election
Yōsuke Tsuruho
LDP
Elected Councillor
Yōsuke Tsuruho
LDP

=== Candidates ===
Name	Age	Party	Current Positions
Naoki Okada	60	LDP	Member of the House of Councillors (2004-present); Previous offices held: Parliamentary Vice-Minister for Land, Infrastructure, Transport and Tourism (2008–2009); State Minister of Finance (2015–2016); Deputy Chief Cabinet Secretary (2019–2021)
Tsuneko Oyamada	44	CDP	Vice Secretary-General of RENGO Gunma; Previous offices held: Nurse
Tamotsu Takahashi	64	JCP	Chair of the Life and Employment Policy Office of the JCP Gunma; Previous offices held: Elementary School teacher
Tetsuro Niikura	43	Sanseitō	Chief Executive Officer of a Training Company; Previous offices held: Fighter
Tadafumi Kojima	46	Anti-NHK	Leader of the Political Organization; Shipping Company employee

=== Result ===
Gunma at-large district election
Party	Candidate	Votes	%	±%
LDP	Yōsuke Tsuruho	476,017	63.83%	
Independent	Keiko Shirai	138,429	18.56%	New
JCP	Tamotsu Takahashi	69,490	9.32%	N/A
Sanseitō	Tetsuro Niikura	39,523	5.30%	New
Anti-NHK	Tadafumi Kojima	22,276	2.99%	N/A
Total votes		856,007	100.0%	
LDP hold				

== Yamagata at-large district ==
Yamagata at-large district election
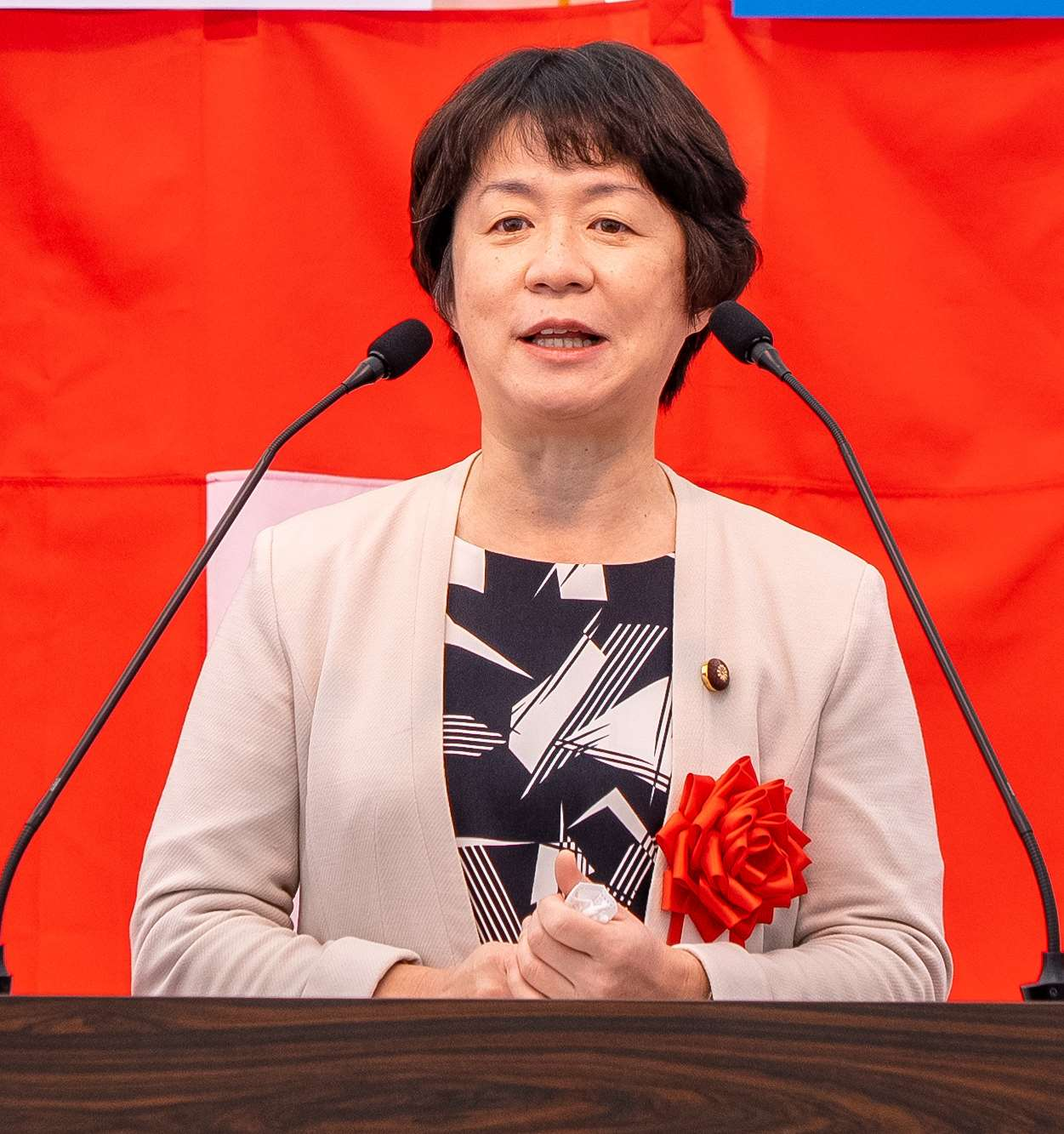

Nominee	Yasue Funayama	Rika Ōuchi
Party	DPP	LDP
Popular vote	269,494	242,433
Percentage	48.96%	44.05%
Supported by		Komeito
Councillor before election
Yasue Funayama
DPP
Elected Councillor
Yasue Funayama
DPP

=== Candidates ===
Name	Age	Party	Current Positions
Takeyuki Watanabe	54	LDP	Member of the House of Councillors (2010-present); State Minister of Land, Infrastructure, Transport and Tourism (2021-present); Previous offices held: Member of the Gifu Prefectural Assembly (1995-1998, 1999–2010)
Midori Tanno	49	DPP	Deputy leader of the DPP Gifu Confederation; Previous offices held: CBC television announcer
Keiji Mio	45	JCP	Standing Member of the JCP Seinō Area Committee; Previous offices held: Chemical wholesaler
Megumi Hiroe	43	Sanseitō	Hairdresser
Masahiko Sakamoto	50	Anti-NHK	Writer; Secretary of the Member of the House of Councillors

=== Result ===
Gifu at-large district election
Party	Candidate	Votes	%	±%
DPP	Yasue Funayama	269,494	52.81%	
LDP	Rika Ōuchi	257,852	30.12%	N/A
JCP	Keiji Mio	74,072	8.65%	N/A
Sanseitō	Megumi Hiroe	49,350	5.77%	New
Anti-NHK	Masahiko Sakamoto	22,648	2.65%	N/A
Total votes		856,007	100.0%	
DPP hold				

== Yamaguchi at-large district ==
Yamaguchi at-large district election
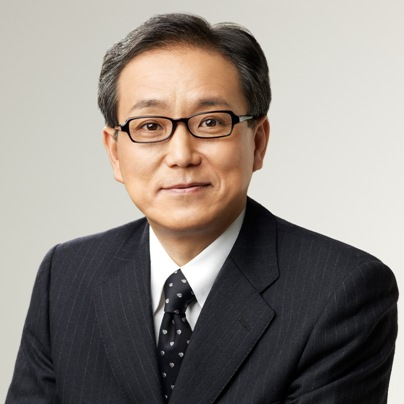

Nominee	Kiyoshi Ejima	Kenji Akiyama	Kazuta Ōuchi
Party	LDP	CDP	DPP
Popular vote	327,153	61,853	53,990
Percentage	62.97%	11.91%	10.39%
Supported by	Komeito
Councillor before election
Kiyoshi Ejima
LDP
Elected Councillor
Kiyoshi Ejima
LDP

=== Candidates ===
Name	Age	Party	Current Positions
Naoki Okada	60	LDP	Member of the House of Councillors (2004-present); Previous offices held: Parliamentary Vice-Minister for Land, Infrastructure, Transport and Tourism (2008–2009); State Minister of Finance (2015–2016); Deputy Chief Cabinet Secretary (2019–2021)
Tsuneko Oyamada	44	CDP	Vice Secretary-General of RENGO Gunma; Previous offices held: Nurse
Tamotsu Takahashi	64	JCP	Chair of the Life and Employment Policy Office of the JCP Gunma; Previous offices held: Elementary School teacher
Tetsuro Niikura	43	Sanseitō	Chief Executive Officer of a Training Company; Previous offices held: Fighter
Tadafumi Kojima	46	Anti-NHK	Leader of the Political Organization; Shipping Company employee

=== Result ===
Gunma at-large district election
Party	Candidate	Votes	%	±%
LDP	Hirofumi Nakasone	476,017	63.83%	
Independent	Keiko Shirai	138,429	18.56%	New
JCP	Tamotsu Takahashi	69,490	9.32%	N/A
Sanseitō	Tetsuro Niikura	39,523	5.30%	New
Anti-NHK	Tadafumi Kojima	22,276	2.99%	N/A
Total votes		856,007	100.0%	
LDP hold				

== Yamanashi at-large district ==
Yamanashi at-large district election
Nominee	Manabu Nagai	Yuka Miyazawa
Party	LDP	CDP
Popular vote	183,073	163,740
Percentage	48.94%	43.77%
Supported by	Komeito	SDP
Councillor before election
Yuka Miyazawa
CDP
Elected Councillor
Manabu Nagai
LDP

=== Candidates ===
Name	Age	Party	Current Positions
Yuka Miyazawa	59	CDP	Member of the House of Councillors (2016-present); Representative of the Nonprofit organization
Manabu Nagai	48	LDP	None Previous offices held: Secretary of Shōmei Yokouchi; Member of the Yamanashi Prefectural Assembly (2011–2022)
Tomohiko Watanabe	58	Sanseitō	Baker; Previous offices held: Employee of Tokyo Electron
Ichiro Kuroki	51	Anti-NHK	None Previous offices held: Taxi driver; Employee of a research company

=== Result ===
Yamanashi at-large district election
Party	Candidate	Votes	%	±%
LDP	Manabu Nagai	183,073	48.94%	
CDP	Yuka Miyazawa	163,740	43.77%	New
Sanseitō	Tomohiko Watanabe	20,291	5.42%	New
Anti-NHK	Ichiro Kuroki	7,006	1.87%	N/A
Total votes		374,110	100.0%	
LDP gain from CDP				
