= Yamaguchi at-large district =

Japan House of Councillors constituency

The Yamaguchi at-large district is a constituency of the House of Councillors in the Diet of Japan (national legislature). It consists of the entire prefecture of Yamaguchi and is represented by two Councillors electing one every three years.

Single-member districts usually get higher attention in House of Councillors elections because they are easier to swing completely than multi-member districts. But Yamaguchi has consistently voted for LDP candidates between the 1960s and 1980s. In the 1989 election when the ruling LDP lost the upper house majority for the first time, Socialist Kenichi Yamada beat incumbent Masuo Matsuoka by a margin of more than 100,000 votes. Matsuoka later ran as an independent and won Yamaguchi again in 1998. He later joined the Democratic Party of Japan.

Currently Yamaguchi is represented by two Councillors:

- Tsuneo Kitamura (LDP, Abe faction)
- Kiyoshi Ejima (LDP, Abe faction)

== Elected Councillors ==
Election year	Class of 1947	Class of 1950
Election year	#1 (1947: #1, 6-year term)	#1 (1947: #2, 3-year term)
1947	Takeo Kurusu (JLP)	Isuke Himei (JSP)
1950	Takeo Kurusu (JLP)	Mochinaga Nakagawa (LP)
1953	Kimiko Abe (Indep.)	Mochinaga Nakagawa (LP)
1956	Kimiko Abe (Indep.)	Yūkei Kinoshita (JSP)
1959	Eichi Yoshitake (LDP)	Yūkei Kinoshita (JSP)
1962	Eichi Yoshitake (LDP)	Kengo Futatsugi (LDP)
1965	Eichi Yoshitake (LDP)	Kengo Futatsugi (LDP)
1968	Eichi Yoshitake (LDP)	Kengo Futatsugi (LDP)
1971	Eichi Yoshitake (LDP)	Kengo Futatsugi (LDP)
1974	Eichi Yoshitake (LDP)	Kengo Futatsugi (LDP)
1977	Tarō Ozawa (LDP)	Kengo Futatsugi (LDP)
1980	Tarō Ozawa (LDP)	Atsushi Ejima (LDP)
1983	Masuo Matsuoka (LDP)	Atsushi Ejima (LDP)
1986	Masuo Matsuoka (LDP)	Atsushi Ejima (LDP)
1987 by-el.	Masuo Matsuoka (LDP)	Hideo Futatsugi (LDP)
1989	Kenichi Yamada (JSP)	Hideo Futatsugi (LDP)
1992	Kenichi Yamada (JSP)	Hideo Futatsugi (LDP)
1995	Yoshimasa Hayashi (LDP)	Hideo Futatsugi (LDP)
1998	Yoshimasa Hayashi (LDP)	Masuo Matsuoka (Indep.)
2001	Yoshimasa Hayashi (LDP)	Masuo Matsuoka (Indep.)
2004	Yoshimasa Hayashi (LDP)	Nobuo Kishi (LDP)
2007	Yoshimasa Hayashi (LDP)	Nobuo Kishi (LDP)
2010	Yoshimasa Hayashi (LDP)	Nobuo Kishi (LDP)
2013 by-el.	Yoshimasa Hayashi (LDP)	Kiyoshi Ejima (LDP)
2013	Yoshimasa Hayashi (LDP)	Kiyoshi Ejima (LDP)
2016	Yoshimasa Hayashi (LDP)	Kiyoshi Ejima (LDP)
2019	Yoshimasa Hayashi (LDP)	Kiyoshi Ejima (LDP)
2021 by-el.	Tsuneo Kitamura (LDP)	Kiyoshi Ejima (LDP)
2022	Tsuneo Kitamura (LDP)	Kiyoshi Ejima (LDP)
