= Shinpei Matsushita =

Japanese politician

- 松下 新平
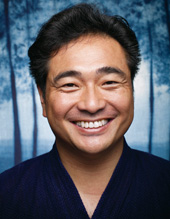

Member of the House of Councillors
- Incumbent
- Assumed office 26 July 2004
- Preceded by: Mitsuhiro Uesugi
- Constituency: Miyazaki at-large

Member of the Miyazaki Prefectural Assembly
- In office 30 April 1999 – 2004
- Constituency: Higashimorokata District

Personal details
- Born: 18 August 1966 (age 60) Takaoka, Miyazaki, Japan
- Party: Liberal Democratic (1997–2004; 2010–present)
- Other political affiliations: Independent (2004–2008); New Renaissance (2008–2010)
- Education: Hosei University

Shinpei Matsushita (松下 新平, Matsushita Shinpei; born August 18, 1966) is a Japanese politician of the Liberal Democratic Party, and a member of the House of Councillors in the Diet (national legislature).

== Early life ==
Matsushita is a graduate of Hosei University. Prior to gaining elected office, he worked at the government of Miyazaki Prefecture from April 1991 to December 1996.

== Political career ==
Matsushita served in the Miyazaki Prefecture assembly from 1999 to 2003. In 2004, he was elected to the House of Councillors for the first time. He is still serving as a member of that body as of January 2025.

== Committee positions ==
Matsushita has held positions as

- Chairman of the Special Committee of the House of Councilors on the Abduction Issue by North Korea
- Member of the General Affairs Committee of the House of Councilors
- Member of the House of Councilors Constitutional Review Committee
- House of Councilors General Affairs Committee 3-seat director
- Member of the Budget Committee of the House of Councilors
- Member of the Special Committee on the Establishment of Political Ethics and the Election System of the House of Councilors
- House of Councilors Constitutional Review Committee 4 seats secretary
- Judge Prosecution Committee Member

== Right-wing views ==
He was a supporter of right-wing filmmaker Satoru Mizushima's 2007 revisionist film The Truth about Nanjing, which denied that the Nanjing Massacre ever occurred.
