= Yoshifumi Matsumura =

Japanese politician

- 松村 祥史
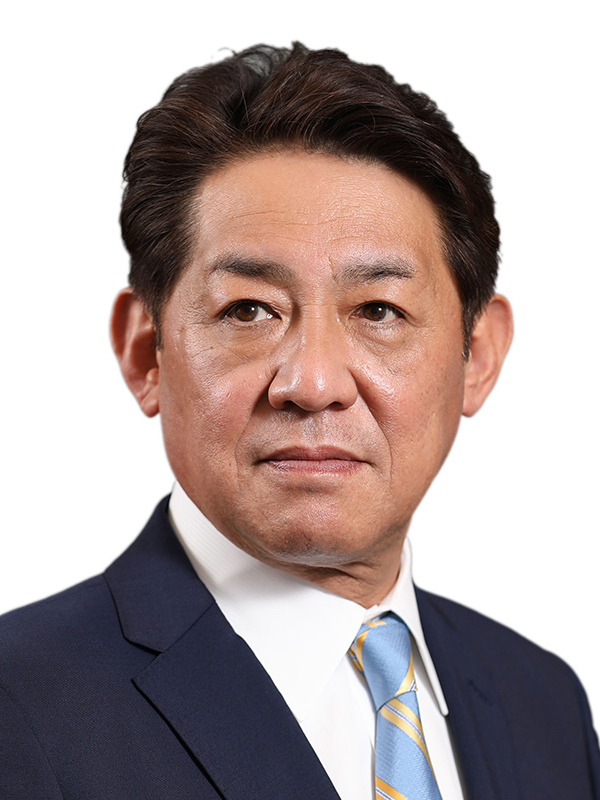
- Official portrait, 2022

Chairman of the National Public Safety Commission
- In office 13 September 2023 – 1 October 2024
- Prime Minister: Fumio Kishida
- Preceded by: Koichi Tani
- Succeeded by: Manabu Sakai

Member of the House of Councillors
- Incumbent
- Assumed office 26 July 2004
- Preceded by: Multi-member district
- Constituency: National PR (2004–2010); Kumamoto at-large (2010–present)

Personal details
- Born: 22 April 1964 (age 62) Asagiri, Kumamoto, Japan
- Party: Liberal Democratic
- Education: Senshu University

Yoshifumi Matsumura (松村 祥史, Matsumura Yoshifumi; born April 22, 1964) is a Japanese politician of the Liberal Democratic Party, a member of the House of Councillors in the Diet (national legislature). A graduate of Senshu University, he was elected to the House of Councillors for the first time in 2004.
