= Kiyoshi Ejima =

Japanese politician

- 江島 潔
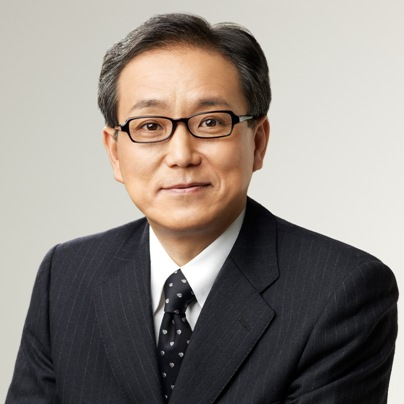

Member of the House of Councillors
- Incumbent
- Assumed office 29 April 2013
- Preceded by: Nobuo Kishi
- Constituency: Yamaguchi at-large

Mayor of Shimonoseki
- In office 30 April 1995 – 26 March 2009
- Preceded by: Hiroshi Kameda
- Succeeded by: Tomoaki Nakao

Personal details
- Born: 2 April 1957 (age 69) Shimonoseki, Yamaguchi, Japan
- Party: LDP (since 2012)
- Other political affiliations: Independent (1991–1993; 1994–2012); JNP (1993–1994)
- Parent: Atsushi Ejima (father)
- Education: University of Tokyo

Kiyoshi Ejima (born April 2, 1957) is a Japanese politician who has served as a member of the House of Councillors of Japan since 2013. He represents the Yamaguchi at-large district as a member of the Liberal Democratic Party.

== Early life ==
Ejima was born on April 2, 1957, in Tokyo. He graduated from University of Tokyo in 1980 with a degree in engineering, and earned a graduate degree in engineering from the same university in 1982.

== Career ==
Prior to his election to the House of Councillors, Ejima worked as an engineer and university lecturer before being elected mayor of the city of Shimonoseki in 1995.

In 2013, he was elected to the House of Councillors.
